= 2023–24 Crawley Town F.C. season =

Crawley Town
2023–24 season
- Owner: WAGMI United
- Chairman: Preston Johnson & Eben Smith
- Manager: Scott Lindsey
- Stadium: Broadfield Stadium
- League Two: 7th (promoted)
- FA Cup: First round
- EFL Cup: First round
- EFL Trophy: Round of 16
- Top goalscorer: League: Danilo Orsi (23); All: Danilo Orsi (25)
- Highest home attendance: 5,572 vs Wrexham, League Two, 7 October 2023
- Lowest home attendance: 865 vs Aston Villa U21, EFL Trophy, 14 November 2023
Home colours	Away colours	Third colours

The 2023–24 season was the 128th season in the history of Crawley Town Football Club, an association football club from Crawley, West Sussex, England, and their ninth consecutive season in League Two, the fourth tier of English football. Whilst the club occupied a mid-table position for much of the League Two campaign, a run of form towards the end of the season allowed the club to finish in 7th, the lowest position to qualify for the play-offs. After defeating Milton Keynes Dons over two legs in the semi-finals, the club beat Crewe Alexandra 2–0 at Wembley Stadium in the play-off final to secure promotion to League One, the third tier of English football. The club also competed in three cup competitions; they were eliminated in the first round of both the FA Cup and the EFL Cup, and whilst they progressed beyond the group stage in the EFL Trophy, they were eliminated in the round of 16 by Peterborough United.

== Background and pre-season ==
In April 2022, the club was taken over by American cryptocurrency investment group WAGMI United, whose stated goal was "to reinvent broken legacy sports management models" and wanted to turn the club into "the internet's team". Upon taking over the club they set the target of achieving promotion to EFL League One by the end of their second season. After manager John Yems was suspended by the club and later banned from football for 18 months for racist abuse of his own playing squad, the club brought in Kevin Betsy as manager ahead of the 2022–23 season, who wanted to implement a possession-based style of football and instilled new training methods to the club, such as the use of a drone to record training sessions, and collecting urine samples from players to monitor hydration levels. Betsy was sacked on 9 October 2022 however, with the club bottom of League Two and having won one of 12 league matches, and his assistant manager Lewis Young took over on an interim basis. Young's tenure at Crawley saw the club pick up 12 points from seven matches, but despite his expectation to be given the manager role on a permanent basis, the club instead decided to appoint Matthew Etherington as manager on an 18-month contract. However Etherington was sacked a month later, having managed just three matches as manager, and Darren Byfield took over from him on an interim basis. Swindon Town manager Scott Lindsey took over as manager on 11 January 2023 alongside his assistant Jamie Day, with the club 21st in the league. Linsey won his first match as manager of Crawley, a 3–2 win at home to Salford City, but were winless in their following 8 matches. Despite this, a 2–0 win away to relegation rivals Hartlepool United on 22 April left the club needing a single point from their remaining two matches to confirm safety, which they picked up in the following match with a 0–0 draw against Walsall.

Crawley played 7 pre-season matches ahead of the 2023–24 season, and won their first three, all by a 2–1 scoreline, away to non-league sides East Grinstead Town, Three Bridges and Dover Athletic. This was followed by a 4–0 defeat at home to Premier League club Crystal Palace, and a 9–1 defeat to League One club Portsmouth, played at Portsmouth's training ground behind closed doors. Crawley then played two further friendlies away to non-league clubs, and defeated Heybridge Swifts 7–1 and Bromley 2–1 to round off their pre-season campaign.

Win	Draw	Loss

Date	Time	Opponent	Venue	Result F–A	Scorers	Attendance	Ref.
11 July 2023	19:30	East Grinstead Town	Away	2–1	Tsaroulla 66', Kastrati 90'		
15 July 2023	15:00	Three Bridges	Away	2–1	Orsi (2) 9', 44'		
18 July 2023	19:45	Dover Athletic	Away	2–1	Tsaroulla 32', Nadesan 78'		
19 July 2023	19:45	Crystal Palace	Home	0–4		5,562	
22 July 2023	15:00	Portsmouth	Away (Note: Match played at Copnor Road Training Ground)	1–9	Forster 40'	0 (Note: Match played behind closed doors)	
25 July 2023	19:00	Heybridge Swifts	Away	7–1	Tsaroulla 4', Orsi (2) 43', 54', Telford (2) 45', 62' pen., Lolos 51', Kastrati 74'	173	
29 July 2023	15:00	Bromley	Away	2–1	Lolos 33', Orsi 56'		

== Players ==
Manager Scott Lindsey wanted to overhaul the playing squad due to concerns over his inherited squads' attitude – he told BBC Radio Surrey that after his appointment in January 2023, it took 28 days before every player turned up on time. Lindsey said that he "had to put that straight" and that "some players had to go" and "we had to bring in – in my opinion – better people, better staff, better players in terms of their attitude and professionalism". Like in the previous season, the club adopted a data-based recruitment strategy, though co-owner Preston Johnson told The Athletic that they placed more trust in this approach compared to the previous season, saying "we just decided to trust in math". He added that the approach was to "find players who has been overlooked or under-regarded but had good underlying numbers for creating, or limiting, expected goals".

Following the end of the previous season, it was announced that Ludwig Francillette, Ben Wells, Jordon Mutch, Anthony Grant and Davide Rodari were to be released upon the expiry of their contracts, whilst three other out-of-contract players remained in contract negotiations with the club; Grant later re-signed for the club on a short-term deal, before leaving the club early in the season to sign for Welling United. Of the other three players, midfielder Rafiq Khaleel later signed a new two-year contract with the club, and goalkeeper Roshan Greensall signed a one-year contract, whilst forward Aramide Oteh left to sign for Walsall. Defenders Tony Craig, Brandon Mason and Joel Lynch, midfielder Jake Hessenthaler and forward Kwesi Appiah all had their contracts terminated by mutual consent. Meanwhile, four players were transferred out to fellow League Two clubs during the summer transfer window: forward James Tilley joined AFC Wimbledon for an undisclosed fee, fellow forward Ashley Nadesan joined Gillingham for an undisclosed fee, midfielder Jack Powell, who was given the club's Player of the Season award for the previous season, transferred to Crewe Alexandra, and on 25 August 2023, striker Dom Telford who was the club's top scorer in the 2022–23 season, joined Barrow for an undisclosed fee. The club did however exercise options within defenders Harry Ransom and Nick Tsaroulla's contracts to extend them by a further year.

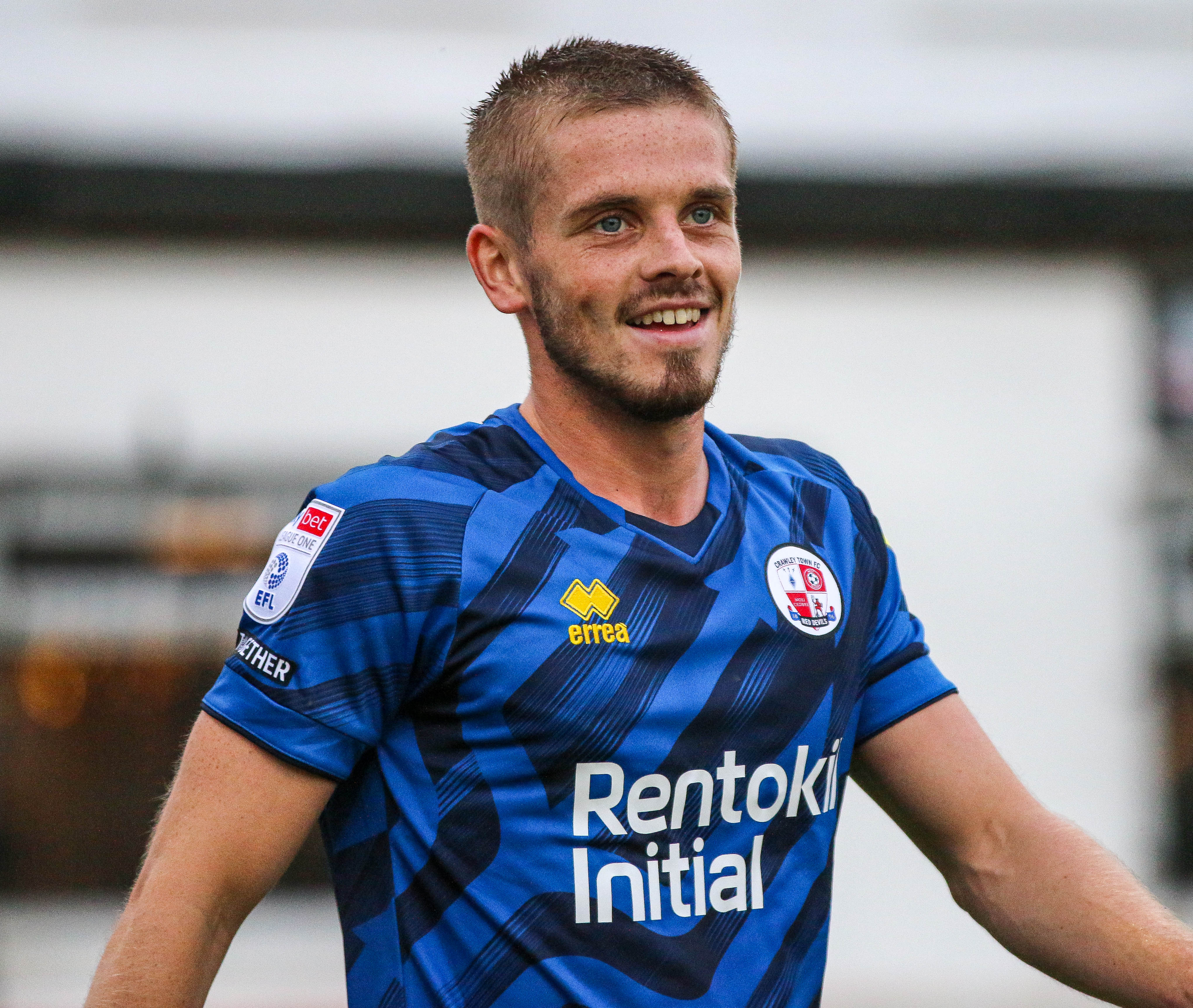
Ronan Darcy was a summer signing from Swindon Town

On 22 June 2023, the club announced the signing of midfielder Liam Kelly on a two-year deal following the end of his Rochdale contract. A week later, forward Danilo Orsi joined from Grimsby Town for an undisclosed fee, with Johnson claiming Orsi's impressive expected goals numbers were what motivated the club to sign him. Defender Joy Mukena, forward Klaidi Lolos and winger Ade Adeyemo all joined on free transfers, with all three players having played for non-League teams during the previous season. Winger Harry Forster also joined the club with Crawley paying his former club Bromley "undisclosed compensation". Jay Williams joined the club for an undisclosed fee from Brackley Town; Williams was described as a defender on the club website, but ultimately manager Lindsey opted to play him as a defensive midfielder, later describing him as a "tough-tackling, aggressive midfield player" and "one of the best midfielders in this division". Defender Will Wright, midfielder Ronan Darcy and forward Adam Campbell also joined the club on undisclosed fees, from Gillingham, Swindon Town and Gateshead respectively, whilst the club also brought in three loanees before the start of the league season: goalkeeper Luca Ashby-Hammond from Fulham, attacking midfielder Kamarai Swyer from West Ham United and defensive midfielder Aaron Henry from Charlton Athletic. Defender Laurence Maguire joined the club on loan from Chesterfield on 30 August on a loan initially until January, though that loan was later extended until the end of the season.

Forward Sonny Fish had joined the club on a free transfer on 8 August, but would not make a league appearance, and would instead have loan spells at Worthing, Tonbridge Angels, Welling United and Gateshead over the course of the season. Roshan Greensall also went out on loan, and joined Broadbridge Heath on loan until January 2025, and midfielder Jayden Davis spent the season out on loan, first at Farnborough and later at Braintree Town.

During the January transfer window, loanees Ashby-Hammond, Swyer and Henry were all recalled by their parent clubs. The club brought in goalkeeper Ryan Sandford and midfielder Jeremy Kelly on free transfers, both signing short term contracts until the end of the season. Defender Mustapha Olagunju also joined the club on a loan until the end of the season, from Huddersfield Town.

=== Transfers ===
==== In ====
Date	Pos.	Player	Transferred from†	Fee	Ref.
29 June 2023	FW	Danilo Orsi (ENG)	Grimsby Town	Undisclosed	
1 July 2023	MF	Liam Kelly (IRL)	(Rochdale)	Free transfer	
3 July 2023	DF	Joy Mukena (ENG)	(St Albans City)	Free transfer	
4 July 2023	MF	Harry Forster (ENG)	(Bromley)	Undisclosed compensation	
15 July 2023	FW	Klaidi Lolos (GRE)	(Oxford City)	Free transfer	
18 July 2023	FW	Ade Adeyemo (ENG)	(Cray Valley Paper Mills)	Free transfer	
18 July 2023	MF	Jay Williams (ENG)	Brackley Town	Undisclosed	
28 July 2023	MF	Ronan Darcy (ENG)	Swindon Town	Undisclosed	
1 August 2023	DF	Will Wright (ENG)	Gillingham	Undisclosed	
5 August 2023	FW	Adam Campbell (ENG)	Gateshead	Undisclosed	
8 August 2023	FW	Sonny Fish (WAL)	(Leyton Orient)	Free transfer	
9 January 2024	GK	Ryan Sandford (ENG)	(Dartford)	Free transfer	
1 February 2024	MF	Jeremy Kelly (USA)	(FC Tulsa (USA))	Free transfer	

† Brackets around club names denote the player's contract with that club had expired before he joined Crawley.

==== Out ====
Date	Pos.	Player	Transferred to†	Fee	Ref.
2 June 2023	DF	Tony Craig (ENG)	(Dorking Wanderers)	Mutual consent	
22 June 2023	MF	James Tilley (ENG)	AFC Wimbledon	Undisclosed	
29 June 2023	DF	Brandon Mason (ENG)		Mutual consent	
30 June 2023	DF	Ludwig Francillette (GLP)	(Eastleigh)	Released	
30 June 2023	MF	Jordon Mutch (ENG)		Released	
30 June 2023	FW	Aramide Oteh (ENG)	(Walsall)	End of contract	
30 June 2023	MF	Jack Powell (ENG)	Crewe Alexandra	Free transfer	
30 June 2023	FW	Davide Rodari (SUI)		Released	
30 June 2023	DF	Ben Wells (IRL)		Released	
2 July 2023	FW	Kwesi Appiah (GHA)	(Boreham Wood)	Mutual consent	
20 July 2023	MF	Jake Hessenthaler (ENG)	(Dagenham and Redbridge)	Mutual consent	
27 July 2023	FW	Ashley Nadesan (ENG)	Gillingham	Undisclosed	
13 August 2023	DF	Joel Lynch (WAL)		Mutual consent	
25 August 2023	FW	Dom Telford (ENG)	Barrow	Undisclosed	
25 November 2023	MF	Anthony Grant (JAM)	(Welling United)	End of contract	

† Brackets around club names denote the player joined that club after his Crawley contract expired.

==== Loaned in ====
Date from	Pos.	Player	Loaned from	Date until	Ref.
14 July 2023	GK	Luca Ashby-Hammond (ENG)	Fulham	10 January 2024	
29 July 2023	MF	Kamarai Swyer (ENG)	West Ham United	15 January 2024	
4 August 2023	MF	Aaron Henry (ENG)	Charlton Athletic	5 January 2024	
30 August 2023	DF	Laurence Maguire (ENG)	Chesterfield	End of season	
1 February 2024	DF	Mustapha Olagunju (ENG)	Huddersfield Town	End of season	

==== Loaned out ====
Date from	Pos.	Player	Loaned to	Date until	Ref.
3 August 2023	GK	Roshan Greensall (ENG)	Broadbridge Heath	1 January 2024	
25 August 2023	MF	Jayden Davis (ENG)	Farnborough	16 January 2024	
25 August 2023	FW	Sonny Fish (WAL)	Worthing	29 September 2023	
29 September 2023	FW	Sonny Fish (WAL)	Tonbridge Angels	8 February 2024	
16 January 2024	MF	Jayden Davis (ENG)	Braintree Town	End of season	
8 February 2024	FW	Sonny Fish (WAL)	Welling United	28 March 2024	
28 March 2024	FW	Sonny Fish (WAL)	Gateshead	End of season	

=== Appearances and goals ===
Numbers in parentheses denote appearances as substitute.
Players with names struck through and marked † left the club during the playing season.
Players with names in italics and marked * were on loan from another club for the whole of their season with Crawley.
Key to positions: GK – Goalkeeper; DF – Defender; MF – Midfielder; FW – Forward

Players included in matchday squads
No.	Pos.	Nat.	Name	League Two		FA Cup		EFL Cup		Other		Total	
No.	Pos.	Nat.	Name	Apps	Goals	Apps	Goals	Apps	Goals	Apps	Goals	Apps	Goals
1	GK	JAM	Corey Addai	39	0	0	0	0	0	6	0	45	0
2	DF	ENG	Kellan Gordon	23 (10)	1	1	0	0	0	2 (2)	0	26 (12)	1
3	DF	ENG	Dion Conroy	32	1	0	0	0	0	3 (1)	0	35 (1)	1
4	MF	IRL	Liam Kelly	33 (4)	4	1	0	1	0	4 (2)	2	39 (6)	6
5	DF	ENG	Harry Ransom	20	1	0	0	1	0	3 (2)	0	24 (2)	1
6	DF	WAL	~~Joel Lynch~~ †	0	0	0	0	0	0	0	0	0	0
6	DF	ENG	Laurence Maguire *	33 (1)	3	1	0	0	0	4	0	38 (1)	3
7	MF	ENG	Ben Gladwin	13	2	1	0	0	0	0	0	14	2
8	FW	GRE	Klaidi Lolos	27 (19)	13	1	0	1	1	6 (2)	1	35 (21)	15
9	FW	ENG	Danilo Orsi	45	19	1	2	0	0	4	4	50	25
10	FW	ENG	Ronan Darcy	34 (11)	5	0	0	0 (1)	0	2 (4)	1	36 (16)	6
11	MF	CYP	Jack Roles	4 (26)	2	0	0	0	0	4 (3)	4	8 (29)	6
12	MF	ENG	~~Aaron Henry~~ *†	4 (9)	0	0	0	1	0	2 (1)	0	7 (10)	0
12	DF	ENG	Mustapha Olagunju *	0 (1)	0	0	0	0	0	0	0	0 (1)	0
13	GK	ENG	~~Luca Ashby-Hammond~~ *†	7	0	1	0	1	0	2	0	11	0
13	GK	ENG	Ryan Sandford	0	0	0	0	0	0	0	0	0	0
14	MF	ENG	Harry Forster	14 (16)	3	0	0	0	0	6	2	20 (16)	5
15	FW	WAL	~~Sonny Fish~~ †	0	0	0	0	1	0	0	0	1	0
16	DF	ENG	Tobi Omole	0 (1)	0	0	0	1	0	4	0	5 (1)	0
17	FW	ENG	Jedidiah Brown	0	0	0	0	0	0	0	0	0	0
18	MF	ENG	Jayden Davis	0	0	0	0	0	0	0	0	0	0
19	FW	ENG	~~Dom Telford~~ †	4	0	0	0	0	0	0	0	4	0
19	DF	USA	Jeremy Kelly	13 (5)	1	0	0	0	0	3	0	16 (5)	1
20	DF	COD	Joy Mukena	5 (6)	0	0	0	1	0	5 (1)	0	11 (7)	0
21	GK	ENG	Roshan Greensall	0	0	0	0	0	0	0	0	0	0
22	FW	ENG	Ade Adeyemo	5 (17)	1	0 (1)	0	0	0	2 (3)	0	7 (21)	1
23	DF	ENG	Travis Johnson	4 (3)	0	1	0	0 (1)	0	4	0	9 (4)	0
24	MF	ENG	~~Kamarai Simon-Swyer~~ *†	0 (6)	0	0	0	1	0	4	1	5 (6)	1
25	DF	CYP	Nick Tsaroulla	35 (8)	4	1	0	0	0	1 (4)	2	37 (12)	6
26	DF	ENG	Jay Williams	40	1	0	0	0	0	4	2	44	3
27	MF	MAR	Rafiq Khaleel	0 (8)	0	1	0	1	0	3 (1)	1	5 (9)	1
28	FW	ENG	Adam Campbell	27 (15)	7	0 (1)	0	0	0	5	0	32 (16)	7
29	MF	ENG	Florian Kastrati	0	0	0	0	0 (1)	0	0	0	0 (1)	0
30	DF	ENG	Will Wright	45	4	1	0	0	0	5 (3)	0	51 (3)	4
42	MF	JAM	~~Anthony Grant~~ †	0 (1)	0	0	0	1	0	0	0	1 (1)	0

== Competitions ==
=== League Two ===
==== League table ====
Pos	Team	Pld	W	D	L	GF	GA	GD	Pts	Promotion, qualification or relegation
4	Milton Keynes Dons	46	23	9	14	83	68	+15	78	Qualified for League Two play-offs
5	Doncaster Rovers	46	21	8	17	73	68	+5	71	Qualified for League Two play-offs
6	Crewe Alexandra	46	19	14	13	69	65	+4	71	Qualified for League Two play-offs
7	Crawley Town (O, P)	46	21	7	18	73	67	+6	70	Qualified for League Two play-offs
8	Barrow	46	18	15	13	62	56	+6	69	
9	Bradford City	46	19	12	15	61	59	+2	69	
10	AFC Wimbledon	46	17	14	15	64	51	+13	65	

Source: EFL Official Website
Rules for classification: 1) Points; 2) Goal difference; 3) Number of goals scored; 4) Head-to-head results; 5) Wins; 6) Away goals; 7) Penalty points (sec 9.5); 8) 12-point sending off offences
(O) Play-off winners; (P) Promoted

==== August to October ====
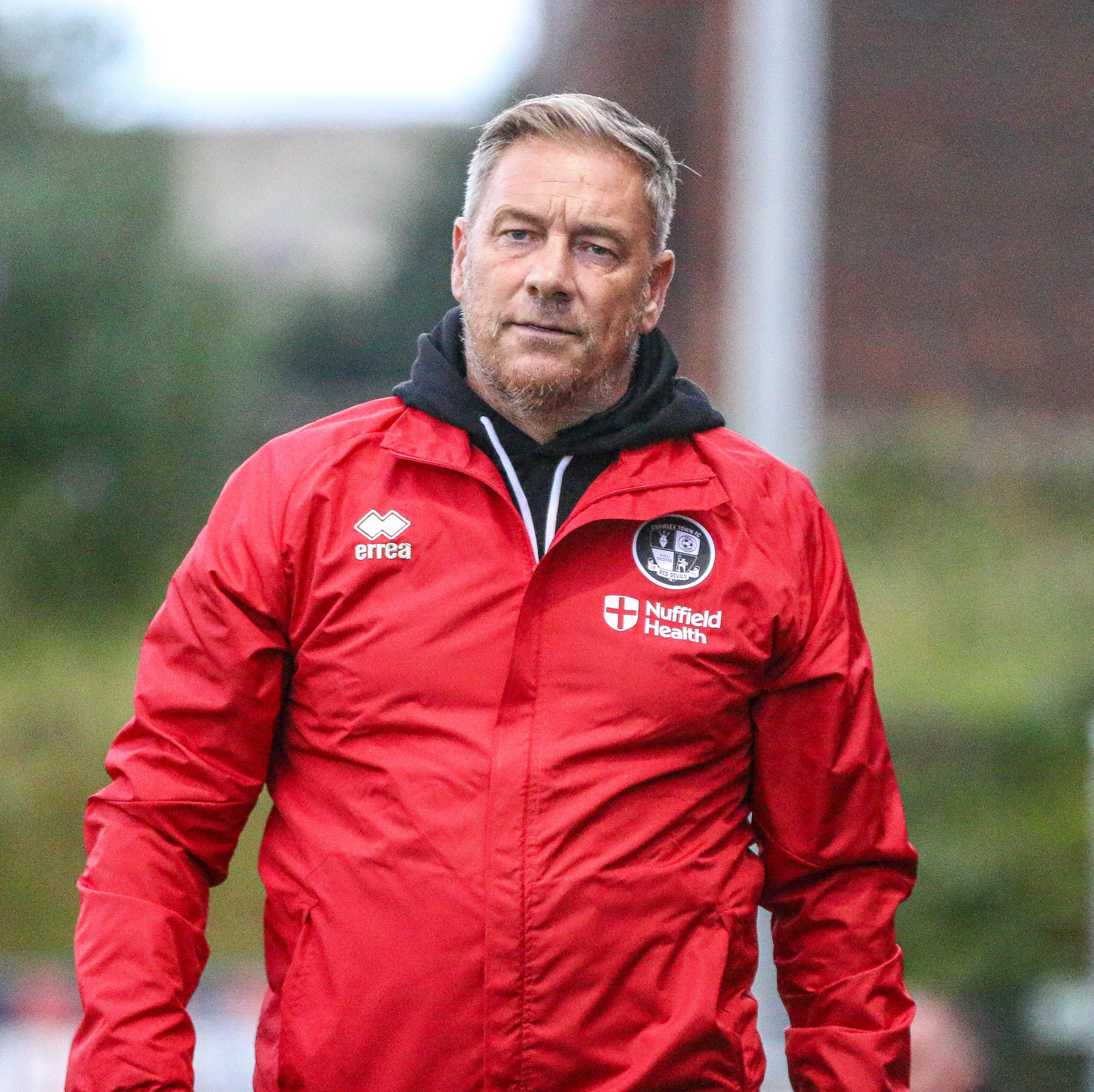
Scott Lindsey had been manager of the club since July 2023

On 22 June, the EFL League Two fixtures were released. Crawley opened the season with a 1–0 win at home to Bradford City – debutant defender Will Wright's 41st minute free kick was the only goal of the game. This was followed by a 1–1 draw at Salford City, where Crawley took the lead after a 40th minute own goal from Luke Garbutt before Conor McAleny equalised shortly after half-time. Manager Scott Lindsey described the result as "two points dropped" with Crawley having hit the woodwork on four occasions. Nick Tsaroulla put Crawley ahead at home to Milton Keynes Dons in the 16th minute and though Mo Eisa equalised 11 minutes later, Crawley won the match 2–1 after Danilo Orsi's first goal for the club on 52 minutes. A 1–0 defeat at home to Gillingham was Crawley's first league defeat of the season, with Crawley defender Harry Ransom's own goal being the only goal of the game. Crawley were then beaten again away to Swindon Town; after Dan Kemp's goal left Crawley one behind at half time, four second half goals from Jake Young and one from Tyrese Shade gave Swindon a 6–0 victory. The result was Crawley's joint-biggest defeat as an English Football League club, and manager Lindsey described it as a "toothless performance".

Crawley started September away to Stockport County and though they went 2–0 down after 36 minutes, Adam Campbell got a goal back in the 42nd minute with a volley that went in off the post. Laurence Maguire, on his debut for the club, equalised in the 54th minute with a volley from Liam Kelly's cross and Orsi put Crawley ahead eleven minutes later, though Isaac Olaofe equalised for Stockport in the 89th minute to finish the match 3–3. A 4–1 win at home to Newport County followed; Tsaroulla put Crawley ahead after 5 minutes before Omar Bogle's equaliser five minutes later for the game to go into half-time level. Campbell scored a second-half brace with goals in the 54th and 67th minutes, before Ben Gladwin rounded off the win with a low drive into the bottom right corner in the 79th minute. Crawley were 1–0 down at half time at home to Tranmere Rovers, though Ronan Darcy equalised in the 61st minute with his first goal for the club. Tranmere regained their lead in the 66th minute before Tsaroulla equalised two minutes later and Klaidi Lolos scored a 96th minute winner to give Crawley a 3–2 win and moved Crawley to 6th, inside the play-off places. It was the first time Crawley had won consecutive home league games for 11 months. Crawley won 3–2 again away to Grimsby Town – Crawley went 2–0 down after 30 minutes, before Kelly scored from 25 yards out and Darcy from a tight angle to level the score at 2–2 by the 35th minute. Crawley won it in the 96th minute once again with Orsi scoring from close range against his former club. Crawley won a fourth consecutive match with a 3–0 win at home to Sutton United, to move up to second in the league – Campbell opened the scoring in the 6th minute, before Maguire and Orsi scored goals from close range in the second half. After Crawley picked up 13 points from five matches over the month of September, manager Lindsey and midfielder Kelly were nominated for the EFL League Two Manager of the Month and Player of the Month awards respectively, though they missed out to Stockport County's Dave Challinor and Louie Barry.

Crawley opened October with three consecutive defeats. After a 2–0 defeat away to Doncaster Rovers, with the goals scored by Modou Faal and Joe Ironside, Crawley were beaten 1–0 at home to Wrexham with the goal scored by former Crawley striker Ollie Palmer. Lolos, on his first league start, put Crawley ahead with a goal from the edge of the area in the 15th minute, before Shilow Tracey equalised five minutes later. Darcy put Crawley back ahead on 28 minutes with a shot from the edge of the box going in off both posts, but a Dion Conroy own goal and goals from Courtney Baker-Richardson and Elliott Nevitt consigned Crawley to a 4–2 defeat. Crawley then drew 1–1 away at Walsall, with Orsi equalising for Crawley in the 94th minute after Walsall went ahead in the 88th, and lost 2–1 away to Forest Green Rovers, with Callum Morton scoring a first-half brace after Darcy put Crawley ahead from a short-corner routine in the 7th minute. Having failed to win any of their five matches during October, the club fell to 14th in the league, though manager Lindsey said that the club "was still in a good position" and that he was "a victim of [his] own success", given the expectations from the club's early season form.

==== November to January ====
Crawley won both of their home games and lost both of their away matches in November. The club began November with a 3–1 win at home to Accrington Stanley; after going 1–0 down in the second minute, Danilo Orsi scored from a one-on-one in the eighth minute to equalise before Will Wright put Crawley ahead in the 48th minute by scoring from 25 yards. Brad Hills was shown a red card in the 74th minute for fouling Orsi in the penalty area and Orsi scored the resulting penalty kick to secure a 3–1 win. Crawley were then defeated 1–0 away to Barrow with Dom Telford, who had joined Barrow from Crawley in August, scoring the only goal of the game in the 46th minute. This was followed by a 2–1 win at home to Harrogate Town, where Ben Gladwin scored a "fierce drive" from 30 yards out in the 23rd minute before Jack Muldoon equalised for Harrogate in the sixth minute of first half stoppage time. Lolos then headed in a 72nd minute winner for Crawley from a Liam Kelly corner. The club took a 10th-minute lead away to Notts County after Campbell found the top corner from outside the box, though David McGoldrick chipped Crawley goalkeeper Luca Ashby-Hammond to equalise ten minutes later. Jim O'Brien and Junior Morias then scored second-half goals to consign Crawley to a 3–1 defeat.

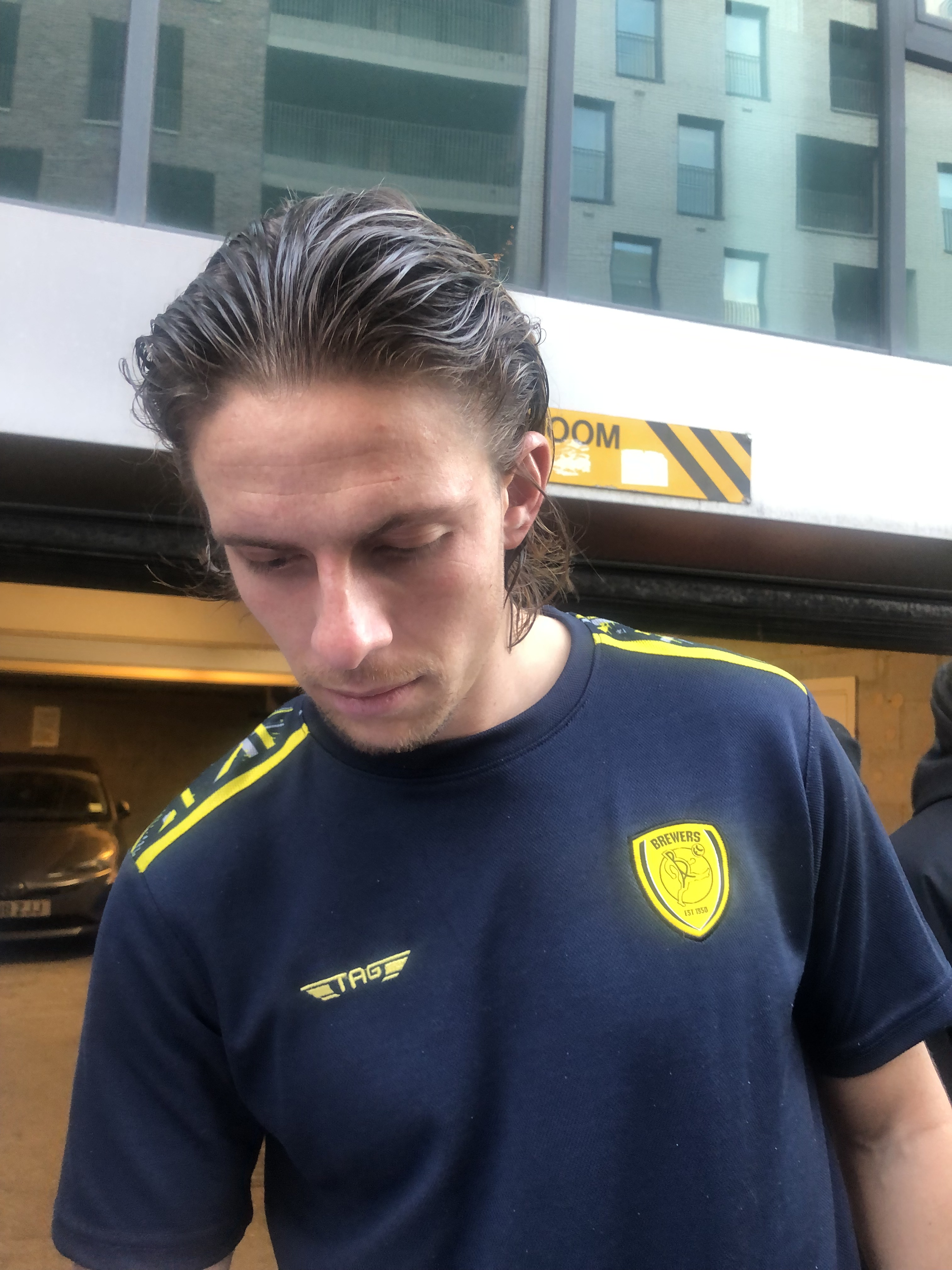
Danilo Orsi (pictured in December 2024) scored Crawley's first goal of 2024

Crawley picked up only their second away win of the season with a 2–1 win against Colchester United, who were managed by former Crawley manager Matthew Etherington; Liam Kelly put Crawley ahead with a low shot in the 41st minute before Orsi converted a penalty won by Nick Tsaroulla in the 64th minute. Joe Taylor scored a consolation goal for Colchester for the game to finish 2–1. Consecutive home defeats followed, with a 3–1 defeat to Mansfield Town, followed by a 2–1 defeat to AFC Wimbledon; Orsi converted a penalty won by Campbell in the 36th minute to equalise against Mansfield after Baily Cargill had put the away side ahead, but Davis Keillor-Dunn and George Maris both scored second-half goals for Mansfield before Jay Williams was sent off for Crawley to consign Crawley to a 3–1 defeat on 16 December, and six days later, Josh Davison and Ali Al-Hamadi put Wimbledon 2–0 up in the first 18 minutes, though Wright got a goal back for Crawley in the 83rd minute, 18 minutes after Joe Lewis was sent off for Wimbledon. Manager Lindsey described Crawley's first half performance against Wimbledon as "the worst they have played under me". A first-half free kick from Wright, and a "deflected long-range effort" from Jack Roles gave Crawley a 2–0 win at Gillingham on 26 December, before Crawley lost their final game of the year 2–0 away at Milton Keynes Dons, with Joe Tomlinson and Alex Gilbey scoring for the home side before Laurence Maguire was sent off late on after picking up a second yellow card.

Orsi scored twice from close range, either side of a 26th-minute half-volley from Roles on his full debut for the club, to put Crawley 3–0 up by the 53rd minute in an eventual 3–1 home win over Swindon Town on New Years Day; Dan Kemp scored a consolation goal for the visitors in second-half stoppage time. Orsi gave Crawley a 12th-minute lead in their following match away to Bradford City with a header from a Nick Tsaroulla cross, though Bradford equalised in the 61st minute through Liam Ridehalgh. Bradford went ahead in the 79th minute after Crawley goalkeeper Corey Addai pushed the ball into his own goal after saving a penalty from Andy Cook, though Adam Campbell equalised in the 85th minute, before Orsi scored a 97th minute penalty and Klaidi Lolos scored 3 minutes later to give Crawley a 4–2 win. A 1–0 home defeat to Salford City on 13 January followed, with Kelly N'Mai scoring the only goal of the game, before Crawley's remaining league matches in January were postponed (an away match against AFC Wimbledon was postponed due to a waterlogged pitch, before an away match at Wrexham was rescheduled due to Wrexham's involvement in the FA Cup.) Crawley ended January in 12th place.

==== February to April ====
Harry Forster put Crawley ahead at home to Morecambe, scoring in the 17th minute, in the club's first game of the month, but a brace from Gerard Garner saw Crawley lose 2–1. A 1–0 defeat away at Crewe Alexandra followed with Rio Adebisi scoring the only goal of the game. Crawley then had a pair of home matches, with a 1–1 draw against Walsall and a 2–0 win over Forest Green Rovers. After Crawley went behind in the first half from an Isaac Hutchinson penalty against Walsall, Liam Kelly "rifled an unstoppable shot into the roof of the net" to equalise in the 64th minute. Danilo Orsi and Klaidi Lolos scored from close range in either half to give a 2–0 victory over Forest Green. Crawley ended February with consecutive 1–0 away wins, firstly against AFC Wimbledon on 20 February, with Orsi scoring from close range in the 78th minute, before Harry Ransom scored a 68th minute header to give Crawley victory over Accrington Stanley on 24 February, to leave Crawley 9th in League Two, and two points off the play-off places at the end of February, having taken 10 points from 6 matches over February.

Crawley would again take 10 points from 6 matches in March. They were beaten 1–0 away to Morecambe on 5 March, with Jordan Slew scoring the only goal of the game, but then won 2–1 away to Harrogate Town. George Thomson put the hosts ahead in the 26th minute, but Harry Forster equalised by "stabbing" the ball in, in the 58th minute, and Klaidi Lolos won the game for Crawley eight minutes later, with a "thunderbolt" from 15 yards. Crawley again came from behind to win 2–1 in the following match, at home to Notts County, with Lolos and Ade Adeyemo scoring in the 79th and 84th minutes respectively after Scott Robertson was sent off for Notts County, who led 1–0, with 18 minutes left. Lolos then scored in a third consecutive game, giving Crawley an 83rd minute equaliser in a 1–1 draw at home to second-place side Stockport County, before a 3–1 win away to Tranmere Rovers. Jeremy Kelly and Jay Williams both scored their first goals for the club, in the second and tenth minutes respectively, to put Crawley 2–0 up, before Luke Norris got a goal back for the hosts in the 21st minute. Orsi scored Crawley's third goal from close range in the 79th minute, with the result taking Crawley back into the play-off places, ahead of 8th place AFC Wimbledon on goal difference. Crawley dropped back down to 9th after a 2–0 home defeat to Doncaster Rovers in their final match of the month however (with Hakeeb Adelakun and Maxime Biamou scoring for Doncaster either side of Tom Anderson being sent off for them).

League Two table on 26 April 2024, ahead of final round of fixtures (part)
Pos	Club	Pld	GD	Pts
5	Doncaster Rovers	45	+5	70
6	Crewe Alexandra	45	+4	70
7	Barrow	45	+6	68
8	Crawley Town	45	+4	67
9	Bradford City	45	-1	66
10	Walsall	45	0	65
Qualification for play-offs

Crawley began April with consecutive away victories, beating Newport County and Mansfield Town 4–0 and 4–1 respectively. Dion Conroy scored a volley to put Crawley ahead in the first minute against Newport and Ronan Darcy scored Crawley's second in the 26th minute before Laurence Maguire and Adam Campbell scored the third and fourth in the second half. Crawley scored early again against Mansfield with Kellan Gordon scoring against his former club in the fourth minute, and Nick Tsaroulla doubled the lead in the 24th minute. Danilo Orsi converted a Tsaroulla cross to put Crawley three ahead and Lolos got the fourth goal a minute later, before Hiram Boateng got an 80th minute consolation goal for Notts County. This pair of results left Crawley in final play-off spot with five matches to play, three points ahead of 8th placed AFC Wimbledon, though Crawley failed to win any of their following four matches. Crawley went 4–0 down away to Wrexham (after a brace from Paul Mullin and goals from Ryan Barnett and Andy Cannon) before Lolos got a goal back in the 94th minute. Crawley then lost 3–2 at home to relegation-threatened Colchester United; Tom Hopper put the visitors ahead in the 21st minute, and though Lolos equalised in the 42nd minute, Crawley went into half-time 2–1 behind after Cameron McGeehan scored from goalkeeper Addai's error. Hopper put Colchester 3–1 up immediately following half-time before Samson Tovide was sent off in the 88th minute and Forster scored Crawley's second in the ninety-seventh minute. Crawley drew 1–1 at home to 6th placed Barrow (with Emile Acquah putting Barrow ahead in the first half before Orsi equalised with a penalty in the 63rd minute), and then drew 2–2 away to Sutton United. Liam Kelly put Crawley 1–0 ahead in the first half, and after Charlie Lakin and Dion Sanderson put Sutton 2–1 ahead, Lolos equalised with a 91st minute deflected shot. This result left Crawley still in 7th, though the club went below Doncaster Rovers into 8th place, going into the final match, after midweek fixtures were played, meaning Crawley were reliant on one of the sides above them (Doncaster Rovers, Crewe Alexandra and Barrow) dropping points to secure a play-off spot. In the final match of the season, Crawley were 2–0 up at home to Grimsby Town at half-time after goals from Lolos and Orsi in the 24th and 34th minutes respectively, whilst Barrow, who had started in 8th, were losing to Mansfield Town, leaving Crawley occupying a play-off spot as it stood. Barrow did get a second-half equaliser and eventually finished 1–1 to put them on 69 points, though Crawley held on to a 2–0 win to put them in 7th on 70 points, and qualified for the play-offs. Following the end of the regular season, the club held their end-of-season awards; Orsi was named as the Player of the Season, whilst Lolos was given both the Young Player of the Season and Goal of the Season awards.

==== Play-offs ====
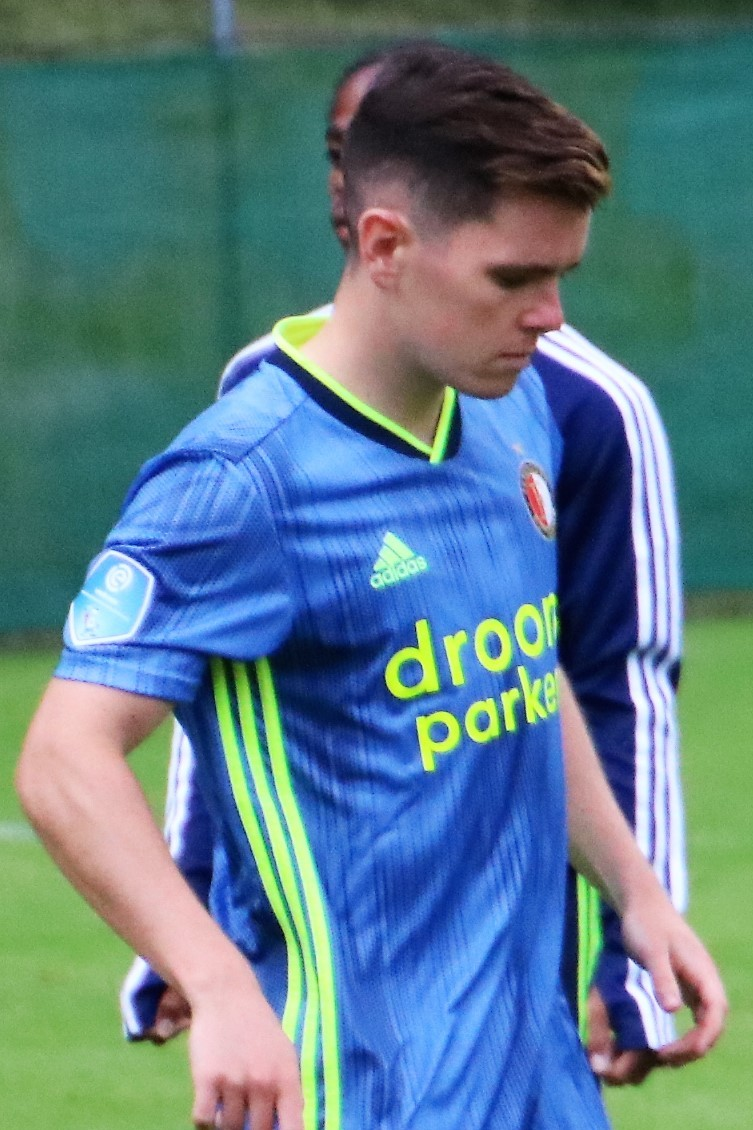
Liam Kelly (pictured in 2019) was given the man of the match award for all three of Crawley's play-off matches.

Crawley played Milton Keynes Dons, who finished in fourth place, eight points behind third placed Mansfield Town, in the play-off semi-final. Playing in their first play-offs, in the first leg, played on 7 May at Crawley's Broadfield Stadium (having been rescheduled from 6 May due to a waterlogged pitch), Crawley won 3–0 with goals from Liam Kelly, Jay Williams and Ronan Darcy. Kelly's opener came in the fifth minute, with a first time shot from the edge of the penalty area, and Williams doubled the lead in the first minute of first half stoppage time, after scoring from a Will Wright free kick. Darcy came on as a second-half substitute and scored a deflected goal in the 65th minute. The second leg was played on 11 May at Stadium MK. After only three minutes, Jay Williams scored for Crawley, with Danilo Orsi adding a second goal in the 30th minute. Max Dean scored for Milton Keynes Dons late in the first half. The one-sided game continued in the second half with Orsi scoring in the 48th minute. Dean had the opportunity to pull a goal back for Milton Keynes after his side were awarded a penalty, but his attempt was saved by Crawley goalkeeper Addai. Jack Roles then scored in the 80th minute and Orsi completed his hat-trick in the second minute of added time to make the final score 5–1 and 8–1 on aggregate, the largest aggregate victory in EFL play-off history, as Crawley advanced to the play-off final and their first ever game at Wembley.

Crawley faced Crewe Alexandra, who had finished 6th, in the play-off final on 19 May, after they beat Doncaster Rovers in a penalty shoot-out after a 2–2 draw in the play-off semi-final. Orsi put Crawley 1–0 ahead shortly before half-time, having scored with the outside of his boot in the 41st minute, after a pass from Liam Kelly. Crewe were awarded a penalty early in the second half, after goalkeeper Corey Addai appeared to foul Crewe forward Chris Long, though this decision was overturned by VAR. Liam Kelly got Crawley's second goal in the 85th minute, scoring into an open net, to secure a 2–0 win and promotion to EFL League One.

Writers in the local newspaper, the Sussex Express, described Crawley's win as a "miracle", citing their relegation battle the previous season, and a major restructuring of the team during the summer of 2023, though manager Scott Lindsey rejected this label, attributing the team's win to "hard work and belief". He said: "I understand life's really short. Most people who were nearly relegated last season would probably think consolidation this year. But it's not a word I have in my vocabulary." Crawley Town held a celebration event at Broadfield Stadium on 20 May where supporters could meet players, get autographs and show their appreciation.

==== Match details ====
Win	Draw	Loss

League Two match details
Date	Time	Opponent	Venue	Result F–A	Scorers	Attendance	League position	Ref.
5 August 2023	15:00	Bradford City	Home	1–0	Wright 14'	3,883	7th	
12 August 2023	15:00	Salford City	Away	1–1	Garbutt 40' (o.g.)	2,255	6th	
15 August 2023	19:45	Milton Keynes Dons	Home	2–1	Tsaroulla 16', Orsi 52'	3,282	3rd	
19 August 2023	15:00	Gillingham	Home	0–1	—	4,310	8th	
26 August 2023	15:00	Swindon Town	Away	0–6	—	8,658	13th	
2 September 2023	15:00	Stockport County	Away	3–3	Campbell 42', Maguire 54', Orsi 66'	7,986	16th	
9 September 2023	15:00	Newport County	Home	4–1	Tsaroulla 5', Campbell (2) 54', 67', Gladwin 79'	2,663	10th	
16 September 2023	15:00	Tranmere Rovers	Home	3–2	Darcy 61', Tsaroulla 68', Lolos 90+6'	2,961	6th	
23 September 2023	15:00	Grimsby Town	Away	3–2	L. Kelly 32', Darcy 35', Orsi 90+6'	6,357	4th	
30 September 2023	15:00	Sutton United	Home	3–0	Campbell 6', Maguire 53', Orsi 66'	3,559	2nd	
3 October 2023	19:45	Doncaster Rovers	Away	0–2	—	5,501	5th	
7 October 2023	15:00	Wrexham	Home	0–1	—	5,572	8th	
21 October 2023	15:00	Crewe Alexandra	Home	2–4	Lolos 15', Darcy 28'	3,028	12th	
24 October 2023	19:45	Walsall	Away	1–1	Orsi 90+4'	4,108	12th	
28 October 2023	15:00	Forest Green Rovers	Away	1–2	Darcy 7'	1,898	14th	
11 November 2023	15:00	Accrington Stanley	Home	3–1	Orsi (2) 8', 76' (pen.), Wright 48'	2,887	11th	
18 November 2023	15:00	Barrow	Away	0–1	—	3,512	12th	
25 November 2023	15:00	Harrogate Town	Home	2–1	Gladwin 23', Lolos 71'	2,829	11th	
28 November 2023	19:45	Notts County	Away	1–3	Campbell 10'	7,716	13th	
9 December 2023	15:00	Colchester United	Away	2–1	L. Kelly 41',Orsi 64' (pen.)	3,132	11th	
16 December 2023	15:00	Mansfield Town	Home	1–3	Orsi 36' (pen.)	2,817	13th	
22 December 2023	19:45	AFC Wimbledon	Home	1–2	Wright 83'	4,792	15th	
26 December 2023	13:00	Gillingham	Away	2–0	Wright 24', Roles 71'	7,150	11th	
29 December 2023	19:45	Milton Keynes Dons	Away	0–2	—	5,945	14th	
1 January 2024	15:00	Swindon Town	Home	3–1	Orsi (2) 9', 53', Roles 26'	3,636	12th	
6 January 2024	15:00	Bradford City	Away	4–2	Orsi (2) 12', 90+7' (pen.), Campbell 85', Lolos 90+10	16,699	9th	
13 January 2024	15:00	Salford City	Home	0–1	—	2,970	11th	
3 February 2024	15:00	Morecambe	Home	1–2	Forster 17'	2,856	14th	
10 February 2024	15:00	Crewe Alexandra	Away	0–1	—	4,189	15th	
13 February 2024	19:45	Walsall	Home	1–1	L. Kelly 64'	2,450	15th	
17 February 2024	15:00	Forest Green Rovers	Home	2–0	Orsi 39', Lolos 87'	2,838	15th	
20 February 2024	19:45	AFC Wimbledon	Away	1–0	Orsi 78'	7,397	14th	
24 February 2024	15:00	Accrington Stanley	Away	1–0	Ransom 68'	2,216	8th	
5 March 2024	19:45	Morecambe	Away	0–1	—	2,297	11th	
9 March 2024	15:00	Harrogate Town	Away	2–1	Forster 58', Lolos 66'	2,124	11th	
12 March 2024	19:45	Notts County	Home	2–1	Lolos 79', Adeyemo 84'	2,542	9th	
18 March 2024	19:45	Stockport County	Home	1–1	Lolos 83'	3,339	9th	
23 March 2024	15:00	Tranmere Rovers	Away	3–1	J. Kelly 2', Williams 10', Orsi 79'	5,829	7th	
29 March 2024	15:00	Doncaster Rovers	Home	0–2	—	5,336	9th	
1 April 2024	15:00	Newport County	Away	4–0	Conroy 1', Darcy 26', Maguire 69', Campbell 90+1'	4,643	7th	
6 April 2024	15:00	Mansfield Town	Away	4–1	Gordon 4', Tsaroulla 24', Orsi 55', Lolos 56'	7,342	7th	
9 April 2024	19:45	Wrexham	Away	1–4	Lolos 90+4'	11,544	7th	
13 April 2024	15:00	Colchester United	Home	2–3	Lolos 42', Forster 90+7'	5,223	7th	
16 April 2024	19:45	Barrow	Home	1–1	Orsi 64' (pen.)	3,155	7th	
20 April 2024	15:00	Sutton United	Away	2–2	L. Kelly 42', Lolos 90+1'	4,675	7th	
27 April 2024	15:00	Grimsby Town	Home	2–0	Orsi 24', Lolos 34'	4,885	7th	

Play-offs

Win	Draw	Loss

Round	Date	Time	Opponent	Venue	Result F–A	Scorers	Attendance	Ref.
Semi-final first leg	7 May 2024	19:30	Milton Keynes Dons	Home	3–0	L. Kelly 5', Williams 45+1', Darcy 65'	5,564	
Semi-final second leg	11 May 2024	19:45	Milton Keynes Dons	Away	5–1	Williams 3', Orsi 30', 48', 90+2', Roles 80'	10,053	
Final	19 May 2024	13:00	Crewe Alexandra	Neutral	2–0	Orsi 41', L. Kelly 85'	33,341	

=== FA Cup ===
Crawley were drawn away to fellow League Two club Notts County in the first round of the FA Cup, with the match played on 4 November. Danilo Orsi put Crawley ahead in the third minute, scoring after his previous shot rebounded off the post, though Daniel Crowley equalised 10 minutes later. David McGoldrick put Notts County ahead early in the second half before Orsi equalised in the 66th minute after converting Kellan Gordon's cross, but substitute Macaulay Langstaff scored for Notts County in the 76th minute to give the home side a 3–2 win.

Win	Draw	Loss

Round	Date	Time	Opponent	Venue	Result F–A	Scorers	Attendance	Ref.
First round	4 November 2023	15:00	Notts County	Away	2–3	Orsi (2) 3', 66'	3,952	

=== EFL Cup ===
Crawley were drawn away to Exeter City in the first round of the EFL Cup. Klaidi Lolos put Crawley ahead in the 15th minute from close range before Kyle Taylor and James Scott scored in the second half for Exeter to give the home side a 2–1 victory and eliminate Crawley from the competition.

Win	Draw	Loss

Round	Date	Time	Opponent	Venue	Result F–A	Scorers	Attendance	Ref.
First round	8 August 2023	19:45	Exeter City	Away	1–2	Lolos 15'	3,560	

=== EFL Trophy ===
In the group stage, Crawley Town were drawn into Southern Group B alongside League One club Charlton Athletic, fellow League Two side Sutton United and Aston Villa U21. Crawley finished top of the group with seven points from three games, having beat Charlton 4–3 (with goals from Harry Forster, Klaidi Lolos, Nick Tsaroulla and Rafiq Khaleel), drew 0–0 with Sutton United (and lost the resulting penalty shoot-out 5–4), and beat Aston Villa U21 3–2, with Jack Roles scoring twice, either side of a Kamarai Swyer goal. Crawley were drawn at home to Bristol Rovers in the second round, and came back from 1–0 down at half-time to win 2–1, after goals from Roles and Forster. Crawley were drawn away to Peterborough United in the third round, with the match against initially scheduled for 10 January 2024 before being postponed due to a waterlogged pitch. The match was played on 23 January, and Crawley lost 2–1 despite Nick Tsaroulla putting the club ahead in the 23rd minute.

Pos	Div	Team	Pld	W	PW	PL	L	GF	GA	GD	Pts	Qualification
1	L2	Crawley Town	3	2	0	1	0	7	5	+2	7	Advance to Round 2
2	L1	Charlton Athletic	3	2	0	0	1	10	6	+4	6	Advance to Round 2
3	L2	Sutton United	3	0	1	1	1	2	5	−3	3	
4	ACA	Aston Villa U21	3	0	1	0	2	6	9	−3	2	

Updated to match(es) played on 21 November 2023. Source: EFL.com

Win	Draw	Loss

Round	Date	Time	Opponent	Venue	Result F–A	Scorers	Attendance	Ref.
Group stage	5 September 2023	19:45	Charlton Athletic	Home	4–3	Forster 1', Lolos 45+4', Tsaroulla 70', Khaleel 81'	1,973	
Group stage	10 October 2023	19:45	Sutton United	Away	0–0 (4–5 p)	—	928	
Group stage	14 November 2023	19:45	Aston Villa U21	Home	3–2	Roles (2) 7', 55', Swyer 15'	865	
Second round	5 December 2023	19:45	Bristol Rovers	Home	2–1	Roles 56', Forster 69'	896	
Third round	23 January 2024	19:30	Peterborough United	Away	1–2	Tsaroulla 23'		
