= 2024 EFL League Two play-off final =

Association football match

- Wembley Stadium in London hosted the final.
Crawley Town	Crewe Alexandra
2	0
- Date: 19 May 2024
- Venue: Wembley Stadium, London
- Referee: Ben Toner (Lancashire)
- Attendance: 33,341

The 2024 EFL League Two play-off final was an association football match played on 19 May 2024 at Wembley Stadium, London, between Crewe Alexandra and Crawley Town. The match determined the fourth and final team to gain promotion from EFL League Two, the fourth tier of English football, to EFL League One. The top three teams of 2023–24 EFL League Two, Stockport County, Wrexham and Mansfield Town gained automatic promotion to League One, while the clubs placed from fourth to seventh in the table took part in the 2024 English Football League play-offs. The match was Crawley's first appearance at Wembley, while Crewe had played there three times previously.

Ben Toner was the referee for the match, which was played in front of 33,341 spectators. Crawley took the lead on 41 minutes when Danilo Orsi and Jeremy Kelly played a one-two before Orsi scored, shooting with the outside of his foot. Crewe were awarded a penalty early in the second half when the referee penalised Crawley goalkeeper Corey Addai for fouling Chris Long, but the decision was overturned by the video assistant referee. Crawley scored again in the 85th minute when Kelly's cross was intercepted by Crewe's Mickey Demetriou, only for the ball to rebound back into Kelly's path, allowing him to score. They went on to win the match 2–0 and secure a position in League One.

== Route to the final ==
EFL League Two final table, leading positions
Pos	Team	Pld	W	D	L	GF	GA	GD	Pts
1	Stockport County (C, P)	46	27	11	8	96	48	+48	92
2	Wrexham (P)	46	26	10	10	89	52	+37	88
3	Mansfield Town (P)	46	24	14	8	90	47	+43	86
4	Milton Keynes Dons	46	23	9	14	83	68	+15	78
5	Doncaster Rovers	46	21	8	17	73	68	+5	71
6	Crewe Alexandra	46	19	14	13	69	65	+4	71
7	Crawley Town	46	21	7	18	73	67	+6	70

Source: EFL Official Website
(C) Champions; (P) Promoted

Crewe Alexandra finished the regular 2023–24 season in sixth place in EFL League Two, the fourth tier of the English football league system. They finished 15 points behind Mansfield Town (who were promoted in third place), 17 behind second-placed Wrexham and 21 points behind league winners Stockport County. Crewe ended the season with only one win in their last nine league games. They played fifth placed Doncaster Rovers in a two-leg semi-final. The first leg was played at Crewe's Mornflake Stadium on 6 May. Doncaster Rovers won the game 2–0 with goals from Luke Molyneux and Harrison Biggins. On 10 May, in the return leg at Doncaster's Eco-Power Stadium, Crewe overturned the two-goal first-leg deficit with goals from Mickey Demetriou and an own goal from James Maxwell. The match was decided with a penalty shoot-out which Crewe won 4–3 with goalkeeper Max Stryjek, at the club on an emergency loan from Wycombe Wanderers, saving penalties from Zain Westbrooke and Hakeeb Adelakun. With the win, Crewe became the fourth team in play-off history to come back from a two-goal deficit in the first-leg, on their home ground, and still make the final.

Crawley Town finished in seventh place, a point behind Crewe Alexandra. They played Milton Keynes Dons who finished in fourth place, eight points behind third placed Mansfield Town. Playing in their first play-offs, in the first leg, played on 7 May at Crawley's Broadfield Stadium, Crawley won 3–0 with goals from Liam Kelly, Jay Williams and Ronan Darcy. The second leg was played on 11 May at Stadium MK. After only three minutes, Jay Williams scored for Crawley, with Danilo Orsi adding a second goal in the 30th minute. Max Dean scored for Milton Keynes Dons late in the first half. The one-sided game continued in the second half with Orsi scoring in the 48th minute. Dean had the opportunity to pull a goal back for Milton Keynes after his side were awarded a penalty, but his attempt was saved by Crawley goalkeeper Addai. Jack Roles then scored in the 80th minute and Orsi completed his hat-trick in the second minute of added time to make the final score 5–1 and 8–1 on aggregate, the largest aggregate victory in EFL play-off history, as Crawley advanced to the play-off final and their first ever game at Wembley.

== Match ==
=== Background ===
The two finalists played each other twice during the regular season, with Crewe winning both of the matches: a 4–2 victory at Broadfield Stadium in October 2023, followed by a 2–0 scoreline in the Mornflake Stadium in February 2024. Elliott Nevitt was the highest scorer for Crewe with 16 league goals during the season while Orsi was Crawley's top marksman with 19 goals during the league campaign.

The match was Crawley Town's first appearance at Wembley in their 128-year history, and their first play-off final. Crewe had appeared in three play-offs finals previously, two at the old Wembley Stadium and one at the new stadium. They lost the 1993 Football League Third Division play-off final against York City in a penalty shootout, defeated Brentford 1–0 in the 1997 Football League Second Division play-off final and then prevailed in the 2012 Football League Two play-off final against Southend United. Crawley were allocated 19,556 tickets for the western end of Wembley Stadium and a maximum of 38,676 tickets, if required. Crewe Alexandra were allocated 38,693 tickets for the eastern end of the ground.

The referee for the match was Ben Toner. The assistant referees were Darren Williams and Paul Newhouse with Hugh Gilroy as a reserve, the fourth official was Lewis Smith. Michael Salisbury and Constantine Hatzidakis were named as the video assistant referee (VAR) and assistant video assistant referee respectively.

The match was televised live by Sky Sports on both its Football and Main Event channels and was also available for live streaming on Sky Go and NOW. BBC Local Radio stations covered the game for each team: BBC Radio Stoke for Crewe Alexandra and BBC Radio Sussex and BBC Radio Surrey for Crawley Town. Talksport 2 provided national radio commentary.

=== Match ===
The match kicked off at 1:30 p.m. in front of a crowd 33,341, of whom more than 16,000 were Crawley supporters and just under 12,000 for Crewe. Crawley dominated possession in the early part of the match, but there were few chances for either side. Kelly had a shot from outside the area on 15 minutes which went high and wide, followed by a shot from inside the penalty area which was stopped by the Crewe goalkeeper, Stryjek. Crawley's Klaidi Lolos had a shot from outside the penalty area on 29 minutes, which was also saved. Crewe began to enjoy greater possession after this and had shots from Conor Thomas, which went wide, and a good chance from Nevitt, whose short from outside of the penalty area was saved by Crawley goalkeeper Corey Addai in the bottom corner of his goal. Crawley took the lead on 41 minutes when Orsi and Kelly played a one-two before Orsi scored, shooting with the outside of his foot. They had chances to extend this lead in the run up to half-time, Kelly having a right-footed shot inside the penalty area blocked and Laurence Maguire and Lolos then missing efforts. The half ended with Crawley ahead 1–0.

Crewe were awarded a penalty seven minutes into the second-half, when the referee deemed that Addai had fouled Chris Long who was through on goal after a defensive error. The VAR intervened, however, finding that the goalkeeper had made contact with the ball, and the decision was reversed. With half an hour remaining, there were two chances for Crawley – Kellan Gordon and Lolos both having shots saved – followed by a shot outside the penalty area from Crewe's Aaron Rowe, which was also blocked. Ten minutes later, Crawley's Darcy, who had come on as a substitute, sliced a shot wide of the goal. Kelly added a second goal for Crawley in the 85th minute when Dion Conroy's forward run and through ball was met by Kelly. His initial short-range cross towards Orsi was intercepted by Demetriou, but the ball rebounded into Kelly's path, enabling him to score. There were 11 minutes of stoppage time at the end of the match, during which Crewe had two attempts to pull a goal back, through Charlie Kirk and Ed Turns, while Orsi had a left-footed shot saved close to the end. No further goals were scored, however, and Crawley returned to the third tier of English football for the first time since 2015.

=== Details ===
19 May 2024
13:00 BST

Crawley Town	2–0	Crewe Alexandra
Orsi 41'; L. Kelly 85'	Report

Wembley Stadium, London
Attendance: 33,341
Referee: Ben Toner (Lancashire)

Crawley Town	Crewe Alexandra

GK	1	(England) Corey Addai
CB	30	(England) Will Wright
CB	3	(England) Dion Conroy (c)
CB	6	(England) Laurence Maguire
RM	2	(England) Kellan Gordon		(substituted off) 65'
CM	26	(England) Jay Williams
CM	4	(Republic of Ireland) Liam Kelly	85'
LM	19	(United States) Jeremy Kelly		(substituted off) 90+3'
RW	8	(Greece) Klaidi Lolos		(substituted off) 90+3'
LW	28	(England) Adam Campbell		(substituted off) 55'
CF	9	(England) Danilo Orsi	41'
Substitutes:
MF	10	(England) Ronan Darcy		(substituted on) 55'
FW	22	(England) Ade Adeyemo		(substituted on) 65'
DF	25	(Cyprus) Nick Tsaroulla		(substituted on) 90+3'
MF	11	(Cyprus) Jack Roles		(substituted on) 90+3'
Head Coach:
(England) Scott Lindsey

GK	42	(Poland) Max Stryjek
RB	28	(England) Lewis Billington		(substituted off) 81'
CB	12	(Wales) Ed Turns
CB	5	(England) Mickey Demetriou (c)
LB	3	(England) Rio Adebisi	(yellow card) 59'
CM	8	(England) Conor Thomas		(substituted off) 65'
CM	11	(England) Joel Tabiner	(yellow card) 66'	(substituted off) 74'
RW	10	(England) Shilow Tracey		(substituted off) 64'
AM	21	(England) Aaron Rowe	(yellow card) 19'
LW	7	(England) Chris Long		(substituted off) 74'
CF	20	(England) Elliott Nevitt
Substitutes:
FW	9	(England) Courtney Baker-Richardson		(substituted on) 64'
MF	25	(England) Josh Austerfield		(substituted on) 65'
MF	30	(England) Charlie Kirk		(substituted on) 74'
MF	14	(England) Lewis Leigh		(substituted on) 74'
MF	17	(Slovakia) Matúš Holíček		(substituted on) 81'
Head Coach:
(England) Lee Bell

Statistics
	Crawley Town F.C.	Crewe Alexandra F.C.
Possession	63%	37%
Goals scored	2	0
Shots on target	7	3
Shots off target	5	3
Fouls committed	11	13
Corner kicks	6	1
Yellow cards	0	3
Red cards	0	0

== Post-match ==
Writers in the local newspaper, the Sussex Express, described Crawley's win as a "miracle", citing their relegation battle the previous season, and a major restructuring of the team during the summer of 2023. Manager Scott Lindsey rejected this label, however, attributing the team's win to "hard work and belief". He said: "I understand life's really short. Most people who were nearly relegated last season would probably think consolidation this year. But it's not a word I have in my vocabulary." Lindsey's Crewe counterpart, Lee Bell, expressed pride in his squad, noting that the season had been a "real stretch" for them given the small number of players available, and also saying that he was "bitterly disappointed just for them as individuals". He congratulated Crawley on their win, saying that they were "worthy winners" and that Crewe had "struggled to get going and create anything".

Crawley Town held a celebration event at Broadfield Stadium on 20 May where supporters could meet players, get autographs and show their appreciation. Crawley's stay in League One was limited to one season, as they were relegated back to League Two at the end of the 2024–25 season. Crewe finished in 13th position in 2024–25, missing out on a play-off place.
