= Jayden Davis =

Jayden Davis is the name of:

- Jayden Davis (footballer), English footballer
- Jayden Davis (sprinter), American sprinter
