= Harry Ransom =

Harry Ransom is the name of:

- Harry Ransom (academic administrator)
  - Harry Ransom Center, named after him
- Harry Ransom (footballer)
