= Will Wright (footballer, born 1997) =

English footballer (born 1997)

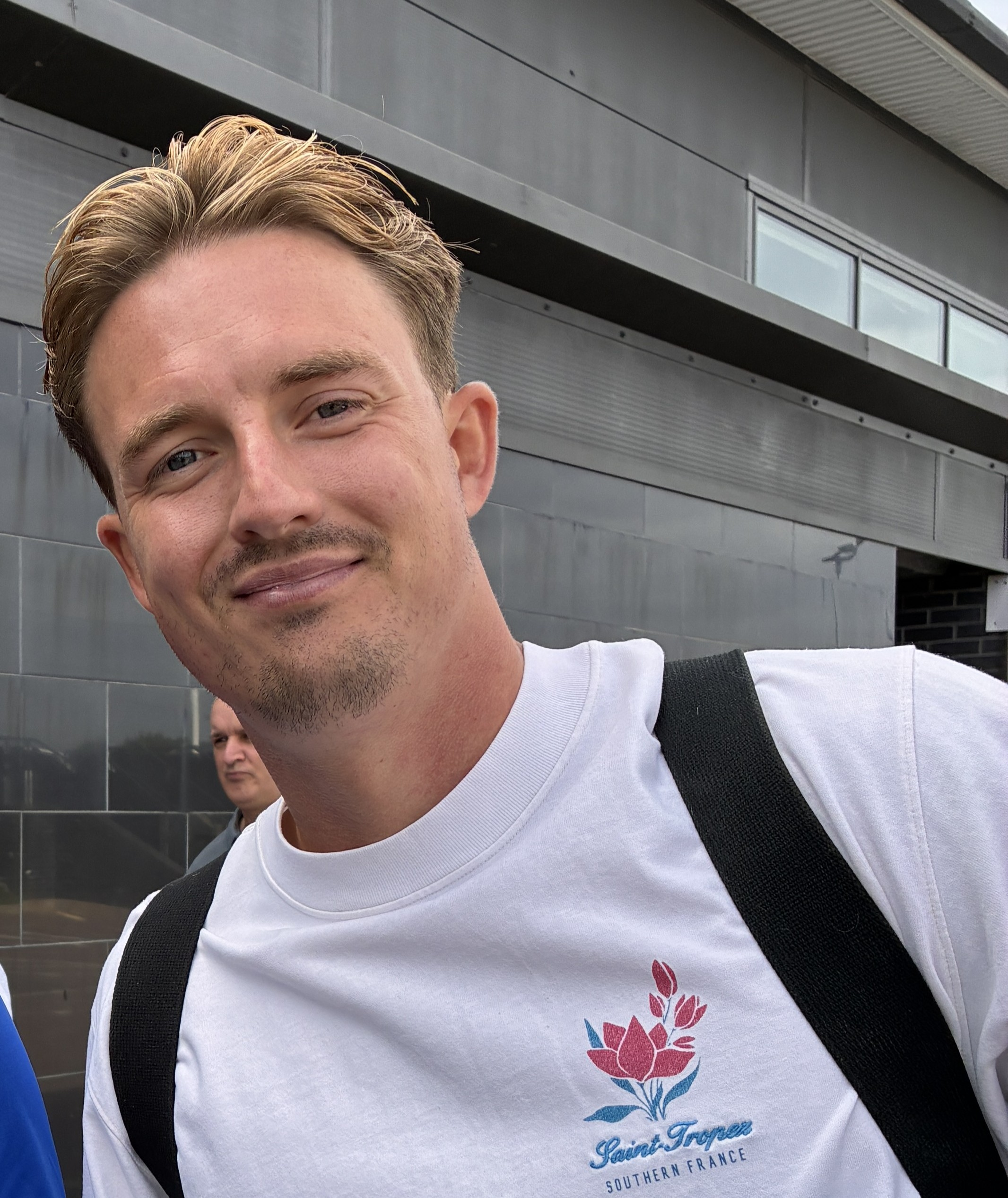
- Wright in 2026

Personal information
- Full name: William Robert Wright
- Date of birth: 12 June 1997 (age 29)
- Place of birth: Luton, England
- Height: 6 ft 3 in (1.90 m)
- Position: Centre-back

Team information
- Current team: Boreham Wood
- Number: 30

Youth career
- Luton Town

Senior career*
Years	Team	Apps	(Gls)
2014–2015	Biggleswade United	21	(1)
2015–2017	Hitchin Town	58	(7)
2015	→ Bedford Town (loan)	5	(0)
2016	→ Barton Rovers (loan)	5	(0)
2017–2019	Colchester United	0	(0)
2018–2019	→ Dagenham & Redbridge (loan)	34	(1)
2019–2022	Dagenham & Redbridge	101	(6)
2022–2023	Gillingham	34	(1)
2023–2024	Crawley Town	45	(4)
2024–2026	Swindon Town	80	(8)
2026	Barnet	4	(0)
2026–	Boreham Wood	0	(0)
- * Club domestic league appearances and goals as of 11:00, 6 September 2026 (UTC)

William Robert Wright (born 12 June 1997) is an English professional footballer who plays as a centre-back for National League side Boreham Wood.

== Career ==
=== Early career ===
Born in Luton, Bedfordshire, Wright played youth football for Luton Town, before playing in non-league football for Biggleswade United and Hitchin Town. He spent time on loan at Bedford Town and Barton Rovers, and went on trial with Norwich City.

=== Colchester United and Dagenham & Redbridge ===
He then signed for Colchester United in summer 2017 where he failed to make an appearance, before moving to Dagenham & Redbridge on loan in July 2018, on a loan deal until 5 January 2019, and after 20 appearances for the club, his loan was extended to the end of the season in January 2019. He made a total of 38 appearances for the club across the 2018–19 season.

He joined Dagenham & Redbridge on a free transfer in June 2019. At the end of the 2019–20 season, Dagenham managing director Steve Thompson said that it would be "irresponsible of me to sign any players without knowing that football is going to start" amidst the COVID-19 pandemic, and Wright was released by the club in summer 2020 at the expiry of his contract. He re-signed for the club on 7 September 2020 however.

He was made club captain in his final season with the club, and made just under 150 appearances in his four seasons at Victoria Road.

=== Gillingham ===
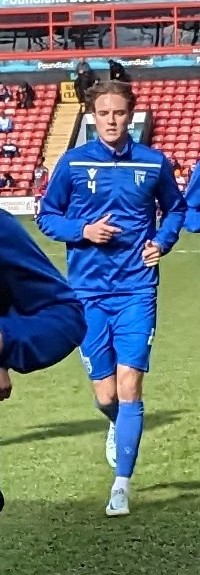
Wright warming up for Gillingham in 2023.

He moved to League Two side Gillingham on a free transfer in June 2022. He made his debut for the Kent side in a 2–0 away loss to AFC Wimbledon on 30 July 2022. He scored twice in 46 appearances over the 2022–23 season for Gillingham.

=== Crawley Town ===
He signed for fellow League Two side Crawley Town on 1 August 2023, for an undisclosed fee. He made his debut for the club, starting at home to Bradford City and scoring a free kick to give Crawley a 1–0 win. He started all but one of the club's league games across the 2023–24 season, scoring four goals, as Crawley finished 7th in League Two, qualifying for the League Two play-offs, and he also started both legs of the club's 8–1 play-off semi-final triumph over Milton Keynes Dons and the 2–0 play-off final win over Crewe Alexandra as the club were promoted to League One. Following the end of the season, Wright was offered a new contract by Crawley Town.

=== Swindon Town ===
On 25 June 2024, Wright agreed to join League Two side Swindon Town from 1 July.

He was released upon the expiry of his contract at the end of the 2025–26 season, after nine goals in 95 appearances for the club.

=== Barnet ===
On 10 July 2026, Barnet announced the signing of Wright. He made six appearances for the Bees in August and September 2026.

=== Boreham Wood ===
Wright joined Boreham Wood on a three-year deal for an undisclosed fee on 29 September 2026.

== Style of play ==
Wright can play at either right-back or centre-back. He describes himself as possessing a "good range of passing" and "hardworking, composed, I like to think I'm a leader and I like to take care of the ball in possession". He regularly takes on set-ball duties and has become known for his ability to score from free kicks and to deliver dangerous crosses.

== Career statistics ==
As of match played 5 September 2026

Appearances and goals by club, season and competition
Club	Season	League			FA Cup		EFL Cup		Other		Total	
Club	Season	Division	Apps	Goals	Apps	Goals	Apps	Goals	Apps	Goals	Apps	Goals
Hitchin Town	2015–16	SL Premier Division	14	0	3	0	—		10 (Note: One appearance in Southern League Premier Division play-offs, five in Southern Football League Cup, three in Herts Senior Cup, one in Hertfordshire County Cup)	0	27	0
Hitchin Town	2016–17	SL Premier Division	42	7	1	0	—		15 (Note: Two appearances in Southern League Premier Division play-offs, five appearances and one goal in FA Trophy, one in Southern Football League Cup, four appearances and three goals in Herts Senior Cup, three in Hertfordshire County Cup)	4	58	11
Hitchin Town	2017–18	SL Premier Division	2	0	—		—		0	0	2	0
Hitchin Town	Total		58	7	4	0	0	0	25	4	87	11
Colchester United	2018–19	League Two	0	0	0	0	0	0	0	0	0	0
Dagenham & Redbridge (loan)	2018–19	National League	34	1	2	0	—		2 (Note: Appearance(s) in FA Trophy)	0	38	1
Dagenham & Redbridge	2019–20	National League	27	2	1	0	—		2	0	30	2
Dagenham & Redbridge	2020–21	National League	31	1	3	0	—		1	0	35	1
Dagenham & Redbridge	2021–22	National League	43	3	2	0	—		4	0	49	3
Dagenham & Redbridge	Total		135	7	8	0	0	0	9	0	152	7
Gillingham	2022–23	League Two	34	1	5	0	4	0	3 (Note: Appearance(s) in EFL Trophy)	1	46	2
Crawley Town	2023–24	League Two	45	4	1	0	0	0	8 (Note: 5 appearances in EFL Trophy, 3 appearances in play-offs)	0	54	4
Swindon Town	2024–25	League Two	46	7	2	0	1	0	3	0	52	7
Swindon Town	2025–26	League Two	34	1	3	0	1	0	5	1	43	2
Swindon Town	Total		80	8	5	0	2	0	8	1	95	9
Barnet	2026–27	League Two	4	0	0	0	1	0	1	0	6	0
Career total			356	27	23	0	7	0	54	6	440	33

== Honours ==
Crawley Town

- EFL League Two play-offs: 2024
