= Sonny Fish =

Welsh footballer

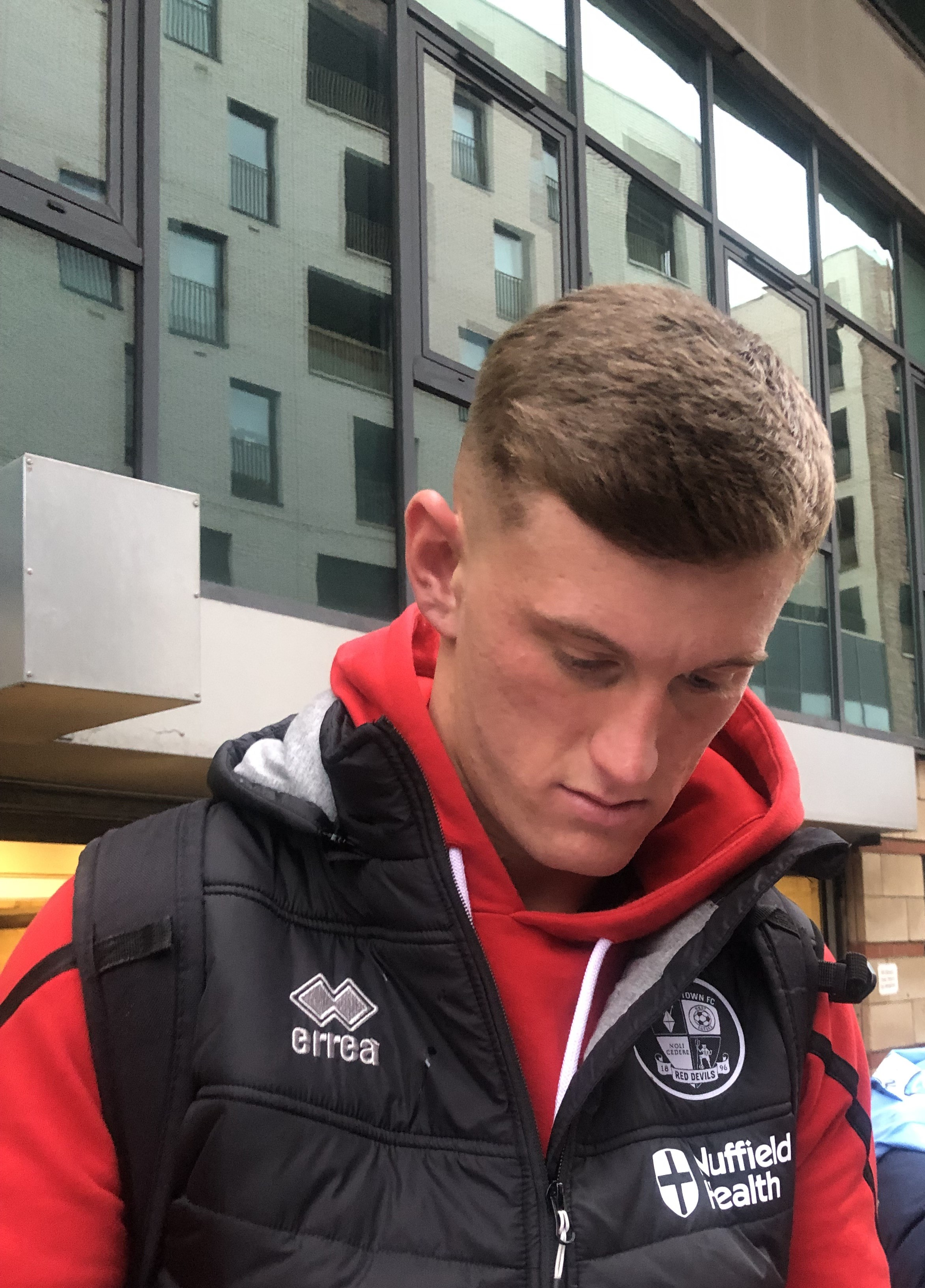
- Fish in 2024

Personal information
- Full name: Sonny Robert Fish
- Date of birth: 9 January 2004 (age 22)
- Place of birth: Southend-on-Sea, England
- Position: Striker

Team information
- Current team: Dover Athletic

Youth career
- AFC Sudbury
- Aveley

Senior career*
Years	Team	Apps	(Gls)
2021–2022	Redbridge	7	(0)
2022–2023	Leyton Orient	0	(0)
2022	→ Bowers & Pitsea (loan)	12	(2)
2023–2025	Crawley Town	1	(0)
2023	→ Worthing (loan)	6	(1)
2023–2024	→ Tonbridge Angels (loan)	9	(1)
2024	→ Welling United (loan)	10	(6)
2024	→ Gateshead (loan)	0	(0)
2025	→ Solihull Moors (loan)	1	(0)
2025–2026	Torquay United	17	(1)
2026–	Dover Athletic	6	(1)

International career
2022	Wales U18	2	(0)
- * Club domestic league appearances and goals as of 22:39, 18 October 2026 (UTC)

Sonny Robert Fish (born 9 January 2004) is a Welsh professional footballer who plays as a striker for National League South club Dover Athletic.

== Club career ==
Fish began his senior career with Essex Senior League side Redbridge, joining the club at the age of 17 after time playing youth football for AFC Sudbury and Aveley. In February 2022, Fish signed for Leyton Orient.

Following time at Leyton Orient, and a spell on loan at Isthmian League side Bowers & Pitsea, Fish signed for Crawley Town in August 2023. He moved on loan to Worthing later that month. His loan with Worthing was terminated on 29 September, and he immediately moved on loan to Tonbridge Angels. On 7 February 2024, he joined Welling United for the remainder of the season on loan. On 28 March 2024, he moved on loan to Gateshead.

On 31 January 2025, Fish joined National League side Solihull Moors on loan until the end of the season.

On 12 May 2025, Crawley announced he would be leaving the club in June when his contract expired.

In July 2026, Fish joined National League South side Dover Athletic.

== International career ==
Fish is a Wales under-18 international.

== Career statistics ==
As of match played 1 February 2025

Appearances and goals by club, season and competition
Club	Season	League			FA Cup		League Cup		Other		Total	
Club	Season	Division	Apps	Goals	Apps	Goals	Apps	Goals	Apps	Goals	Apps	Goals
Leyton Orient	2022–23	League Two	0	0	0	0	0	0	0	0	0	0
Bowers & Pitsea (loan)	2022–23	Isthmian League Premier Division	12	2	1	0	—		1 (Note: Appearance(s) in Alan Turvey Trophy)	0	14	2
Crawley Town	2023–24	League Two	0	0	0	0	1	0	0	0	1	0
Crawley Town	2024–25	League One	1	0	1	0	0	0	1 (Note: Appearance(s) in EFL Trophy)	0	3	0
Crawley Town	Total		1	0	1	0	1	0	1	0	4	0
Worthing (loan)	2023–24	National League South	5	1	1	0	—		0	0	6	1
Tonbridge Angels (loan)	2023–24	National League South	9	1	0	0	—		1 (Note: Appearance(s) in FA Trophy)	0	10	1
Welling United (loan)	2023–24	National League South	10	6	0	0	—		0	0	10	6
Solihull Moors (loan)	2024–25	National League	1	0	0	0	—		0	0	1	0
Torquay United	2025–26	National League South	0	0	0	0	—		0	0	0	0
Career total			38	10	3	0	1	0	3	0	45	10
