= Harry Forster =

English footballer (born 2000)

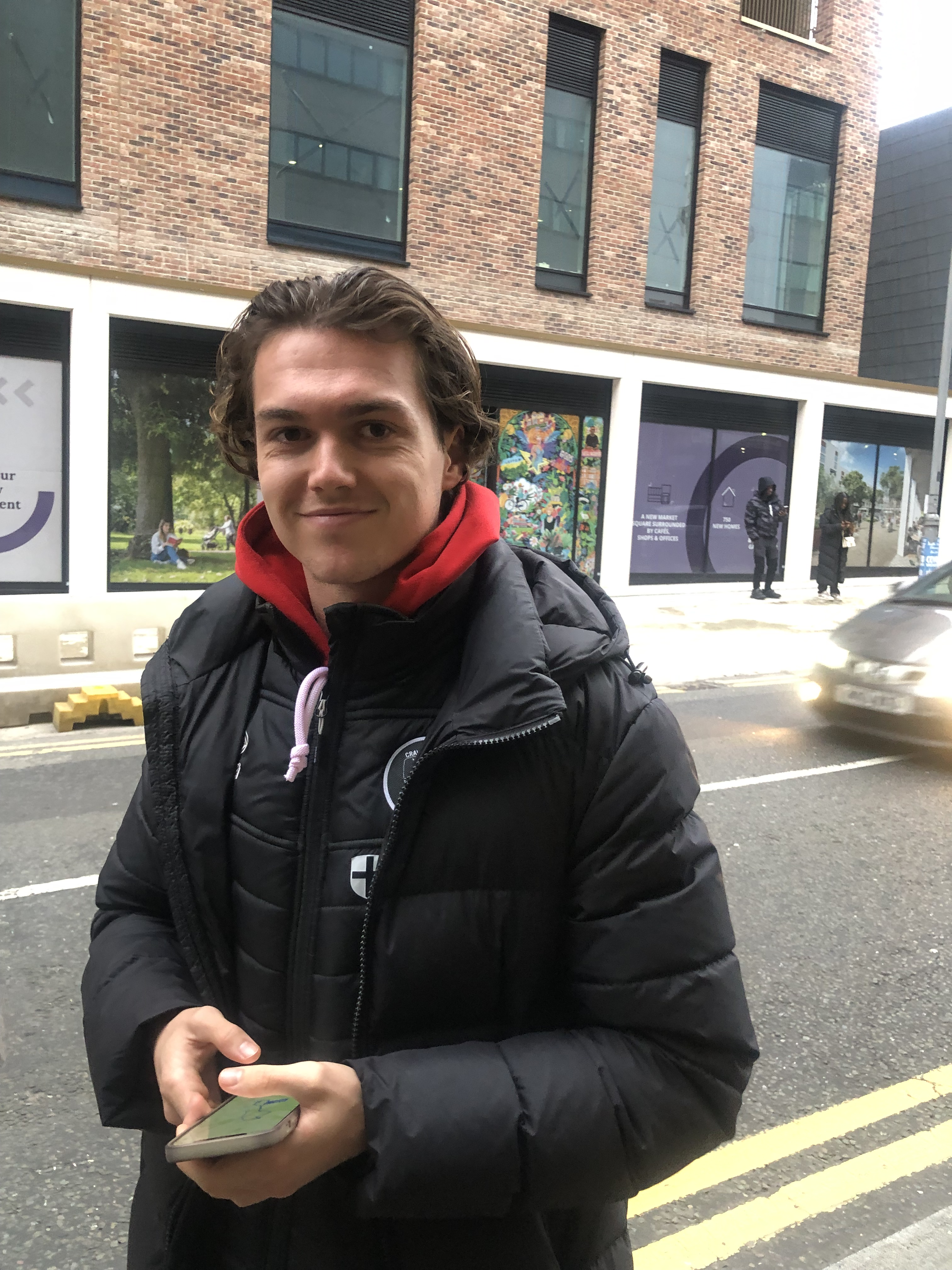
- Forster in 2024.

Personal information
- Full name: Harry James Forster
- Date of birth: 11 May 2000 (age 26)
- Position: Winger

Team information
- Current team: Dorking Wanderers
- Number: 19

Youth career
- 2011–2020: Watford

Senior career*
Years	Team	Apps	(Gls)
2020–2021	Watford	0	(0)
2020	→ St Albans City (loan)	5	(0)
2020–2021	→ Bromley (loan)	14	(0)
2021–2023	Bromley	64	(2)
2023–2026	Crawley Town	95	(9)
2026–	Dorking Wanderers	8	(1)
- * Club domestic league appearances and goals as of 20:00, 21 September 2026 (UTC)

Harry James Forster (born 11 May 2000) is an English professional footballer who plays as a winger for National League South club Dorking Wanderers.

== Career ==
Forster joined Watford at under-11, turning professional in 2018. He was loaned to St Albans City before signing for Bromley. After rejecting a new contract from Bromley, Forster signed for Crawley Town in July 2023. On 5 September 2023 he scored his first goal for the club in a 4–3 win against League 1 side Charlton Athletic in the EFL Trophy.

On 23 June 2025, the club announced the player had signed a new one-year deal.

On 1 August 2026, Forster joined National League South club Dorking Wanderers on a three-year deal.

== Career statistics ==
As of match played 12 September 2026

Appearances and goals by club, season and competition
Club	Season	League			FA Cup		EFL Cup		Other		Total	
Club	Season	Division	Apps	Goals	Apps	Goals	Apps	Goals	Apps	Goals	Apps	Goals
Watford	2019–20	Premier League	0	0	0	0	0	0	—		0	0
Watford	2020–21	Championship	0	0	0	0	0	0	—		0	0
Watford	Total		0	0	0	0	0	0	—		0	0
St Albans City (loan)	2019–20	National League South	5	0	—		—		—		5	0
Bromley (loan)	2020–21	National League	14	0	2	0	—		3 (Note: Two appearances and two goals in FA Trophy, one appearance in National League play-offs)	2	19	2
Bromley	2021–22	National League	23	0	1	0	—		3 (Note: Appearances in FA Trophy)	0	26	0
Bromley	2022–23	National League	41	2	1	0	—		2 (Note: One appearance in FA Trophy, one in National League play-offs)	0	44	2
Bromley	Total		64	2	2	0	—		5	0	71	2
Crawley Town	2023–24	League Two	30	3	0	0	0	0	6 (Note: Four appearances and two goals in EFL Trophy, two appearances in League Two play-offs)	2	36	5
Crawley Town	2024–25	League One	26	2	1	0	0	0	0	0	27	2
Crawley Town	2025–26	League Two	39	4	1	0	0	0	2 (Note: Appearances in EFL Trophy)	0	42	4
Crawley Town	Total		95	9	2	0	0	0	8	2	105	11
Dorking Wanderers	2026–27	National League South	8	1	0	0	—		0	0	8	1
Career total			186	12	6	0	0	0	16	4	208	16
