= Dion Conroy =

English footballer (born 1995)

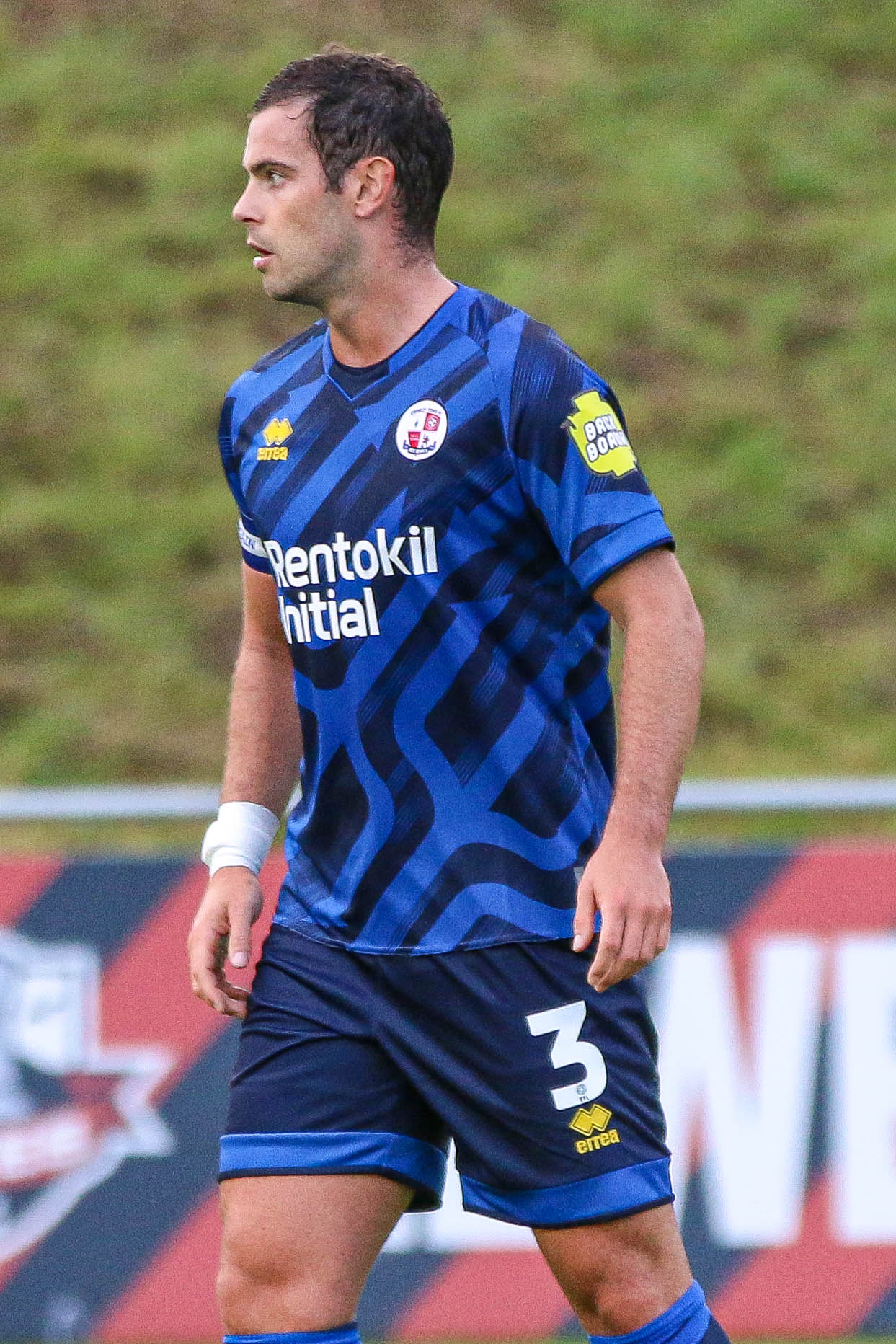
- Conroy playing for Crawley Town in July 2024

Personal information
- Full name: Dion John Conroy
- Date of birth: 11 December 1995 (age 30)
- Place of birth: Redhill, England
- Height: 6 ft 2 in (1.88 m)
- Position: Defender

Team information
- Current team: Wealdstone
- Number: 5

Youth career
- –2008: Fulham
- 2008–2016: Chelsea

Senior career*
Years	Team	Apps	(Gls)
2016–2017	Chelsea	0	(0)
2016–2017	→ Aldershot Town (loan)	15	(0)
2017–2022	Swindon Town	113	(2)
2022–2026	Crawley Town	97	(3)
2026–	Wealdstone	9	(0)
- * Club domestic league appearances and goals as of 22:00, 10 November 2026 (UTC)

Dion John Conroy (born 11 December 1995) is an English professional footballer who plays as a defender for National League club Wealdstone.

== Club career ==
=== Chelsea ===
After a spell with Fulham, Conroy joined Chelsea in 2008 as an Under-13. Conroy quickly progressed through the youth ranks with the Blues and guided Chelsea to FA Youth Cup and Under-21 Premier League victories in 2014. On 29 February 2016, Conroy was rewarded with a new two-year contract until 2018.

On 31 August 2016, Conroy joined National League side Aldershot Town on a six-month loan deal until January 2017. A week later, Conroy made his Aldershot debut in a 1–1 draw against Boreham Wood, featuring for the full 90 minutes. On 22 December 2016, after impressing with Aldershot, Conroy's loan was extended until the end of the 2016–17 campaign. However, just over a month later, Chelsea terminated his loan deal, with many Football League clubs interested in purchasing the defender.

=== Swindon Town ===
On 27 January 2017, Conroy joined League One side Swindon Town on a two-and-a-half-year deal. A day later, Conroy made his Swindon debut in a 1–0 away defeat against local rivals Bristol Rovers, replacing Lloyd Jones in the 90th minute. On 11 February 2017, Conroy was given his first start by manager Luke Williams, in Swindon's 1–0 away defeat against Bury, featuring for the entire 90 minutes. On 16 September 2017, Conroy ruptured the anterior cruciate ligament during Swindon's 3–2 victory over Stevenage, ruling him out for several months.

He was offered a new contract by Swindon at the end of the 2018–19 season. In June 2019 he signed a new one-year contract.

Following defeat to Port Vale in the EFL League Two play-offs, Conroy was released at the end of the 2021–22 season.

=== Crawley Town ===
On 30 June 2022, it was announced that Conroy had joined EFL League Two club Crawley Town on a two-year contract.

Conroy started all three of Crawley's League Two play-off matches at the end of the 2023–24 as Crawley were promoted to League One after a 2–0 victory over Crewe Alexandra in the final.

On 27 June 2025, the club announced he had signed a new two-year deal.

He was left out of Crawley's registered squad for the second half of the 2025–26 season, and was replaced as captain by Jay Williams.

=== Wealdstone ===
On 6 August 2026, Conroy signed for National League side Wealdstone. He made his debut two days later, in a 2–2 draw away at AFC Fylde.

== Personal life ==
Conroy is the younger brother of semi-professional footballer Jay Conroy.

== Career statistics ==
As of match played 7 November 2026

Appearances and goals by club, season and competition
Club	Season	League			FA Cup		League Cup		Other		Total	
Club	Season	Division	Apps	Goals	Apps	Goals	Apps	Goals	Apps	Goals	Apps	Goals
Chelsea	2016–17	Premier League	0	0	0	0	0	0	—		0	0
Aldershot Town (loan)	2016–17	National League	15	0	0	0	—		2 (Note: Appearance(s) in FA Trophy)	0	17	0
Swindon Town	2016–17	League One	14	0	0	0	0	0	0	0	14	0
Swindon Town	2017–18	League Two	7	0	0	0	0	0	1 (Note: Appearance(s) in EFL Trophy)	0	8	0
Swindon Town	2018–19	League Two	27	1	1	0	0	0	2	0	30	1
Swindon Town	2019–20	League Two	11	0	0	0	0	0	0	0	11	0
Swindon Town	2020–21	League One	19	0	0	0	0	0	0	0	19	0
Swindon Town	2021–22	League Two	35	1	3	0	0	0	3 (Note: One appearance in EFL Trophy and two appearances in EFL League Two play-offs)	0	41	1
Swindon Town	Total		113	2	4	0	0	0	6	0	123	2
Crawley Town	2022–23	League Two	25	2	0	0	1	0	0	0	26	2
Crawley Town	2023–24	League Two	32	1	0	0	0	0	4 (Note: One appearance in EFL Trophy and three appearances in EFL League Two play-offs)	0	36	1
Crawley Town	2024–25	League One	21	0	0	0	0	0	0	0	21	0
Crawley Town	2025–26	League Two	19	0	1	0	0	0	1	0	21	0
Crawley Town	Total		97	3	1	0	1	0	5	0	104	3
Wealdstone	2026–27	National League	9	0	2	0	—		1 (Note: Appearances in National League Cup)	0	12	0
Career total			234	5	7	0	1	0	14	0	256	5

== Honours ==
Swindon Town

- EFL League Two: 2019–20

Crawley Town

- EFL League Two play-offs: 2024
