= Joy Mukena =

English footballer

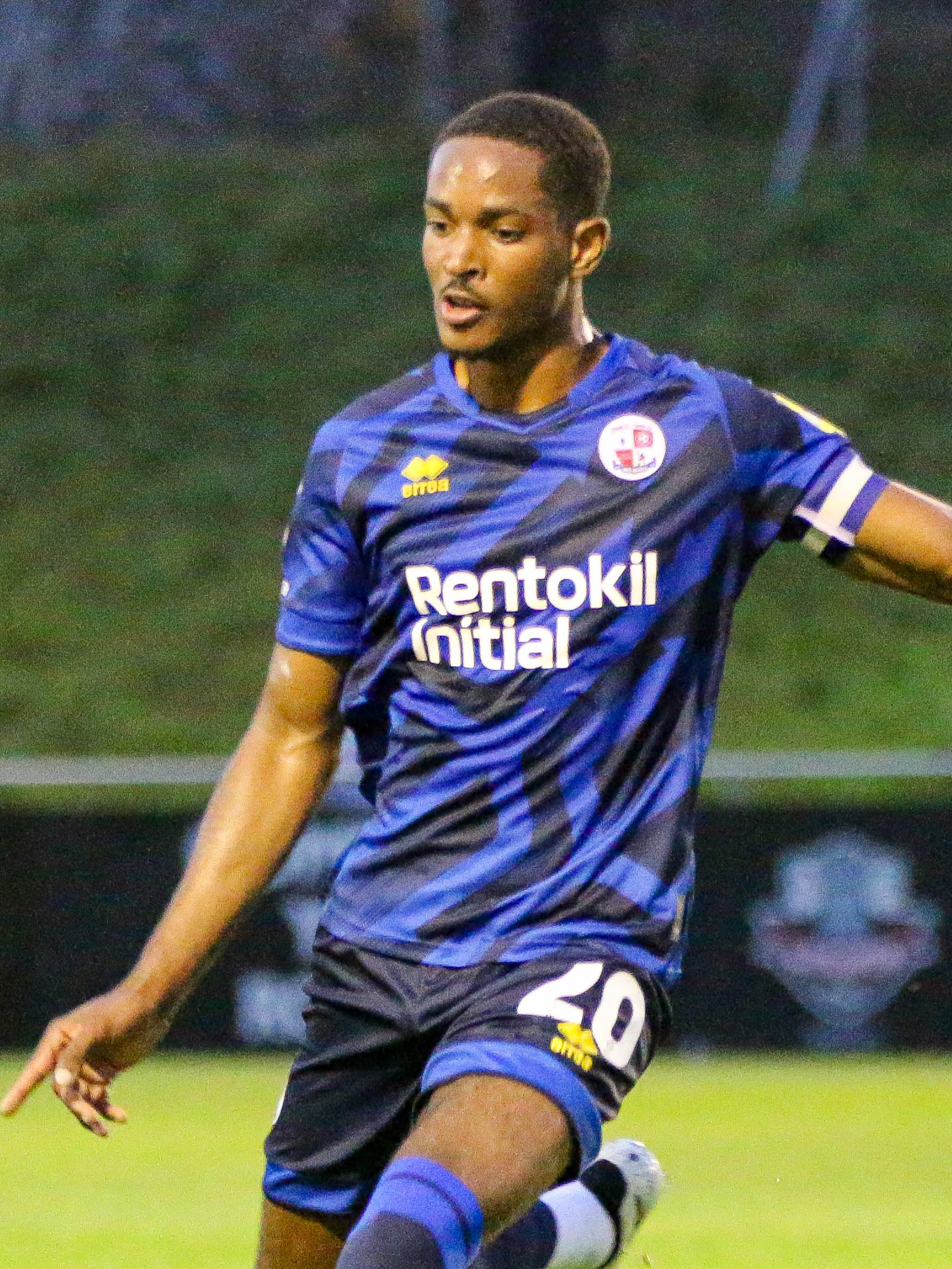
- Mukena with Crawley Town in July 2024

Personal information
- Full name: Joy Richard Mpinga Mukena
- Date of birth: 3 July 1999 (age 27)
- Place of birth: Enfield, England
- Height: 1.79 m (5 ft 10 in)
- Position: Defender

Team information
- Current team: Yeovil Town
- Number: 2

Youth career
- –2016: Tottenham Hotspur
- 2017: Watford

Senior career*
Years	Team	Apps	(Gls)
2017–2019	Watford	0	(0)
2019–2020	Bracknell Town	9	(3)
2020–2023	St Albans City	83	(1)
2023–2026	Crawley Town	31	(0)
2026–	Yeovil Town	23	(0)
- * Club domestic league appearances and goals as of 16:32, 12 September 2026 (UTC)

Joy Richard Mpinga Mukena (born 3 July 1999) is an English professional footballer who plays as a defender for National League club Yeovil Town.

== Career ==
Mukena began his career with Tottenham Hotspur, but moved to Watford in 2017, where he turned professional. He was named on the bench for the senior team's 4–1 win over Chelsea on 5 February 2018, but was ultimately an unused substitute.

On 21 August 2020, Mukena signed for National League South side St Albans City.

On 3 July 2023, Mukena signed for League Two club Crawley Town on a two-year deal.

On 24 June 2025, the club announced he had signed a new one-year deal.

On 12 January 2026, he transferred to National League club Yeovil Town.

== Personal life ==
Mukena was born in England and is also eligible to represent the DR Congo and Belgium at international level. Mukena was called up to a DR Congo U20 football camp in March 2018.

== Career statistics ==
As of match played 12 September 2026

Appearances and goals by club, season and competition
Club	Season	League			FA Cup		League Cup		Other		Total	
Club	Season	Division	Apps	Goals	Apps	Goals	Apps	Goals	Apps	Goals	Apps	Goals
Bracknell Town	2019–20	Isthmian League South Central Division	9	3	0	0	—		3 (Note: Appearance(s) in Alan Turvey Trophy)	0	12	3
St Albans City	2020–21	National League South	11	0	2	0	—		2 (Note: Appearance(s) in FA Trophy)	0	15	0
St Albans City	2021–22	National League South	29	1	7	0	—		3	0	39	1
St Albans City	2022–23	National League South	43	0	0	0	—		1	0	44	0
St Albans City	Total		83	1	9	0	—		6	0	98	1
Crawley Town	2023–24	League Two	11	0	0	0	1	0	6 (Note: 5 appearances in EFL Trophy, 1 appearance in EFL League Two play-offs)	0	18	0
Crawley Town	2024–25	League One	19	0	2	0	2	0	2 (Note: Appearance(s) in EFL Trophy)	0	25	0
Crawley Town	2025–26	League Two	1	0	0	0	1	0	2	0	4	0
Crawley Town	Total		31	0	2	0	4	0	10	0	47	0
Yeovil Town	2025–26	National League	16	0	—		—		2	0	18	0
Yeovil Town	2026–27	National League	7	0	0	0	—		0	0	7	0
Yeovil Town	Total		23	0	0	0	—		2	0	25	0
Career total			146	4	11	0	4	0	21	0	182	4
