= Scott Lindsey =

English footballer and manager (born 1972)

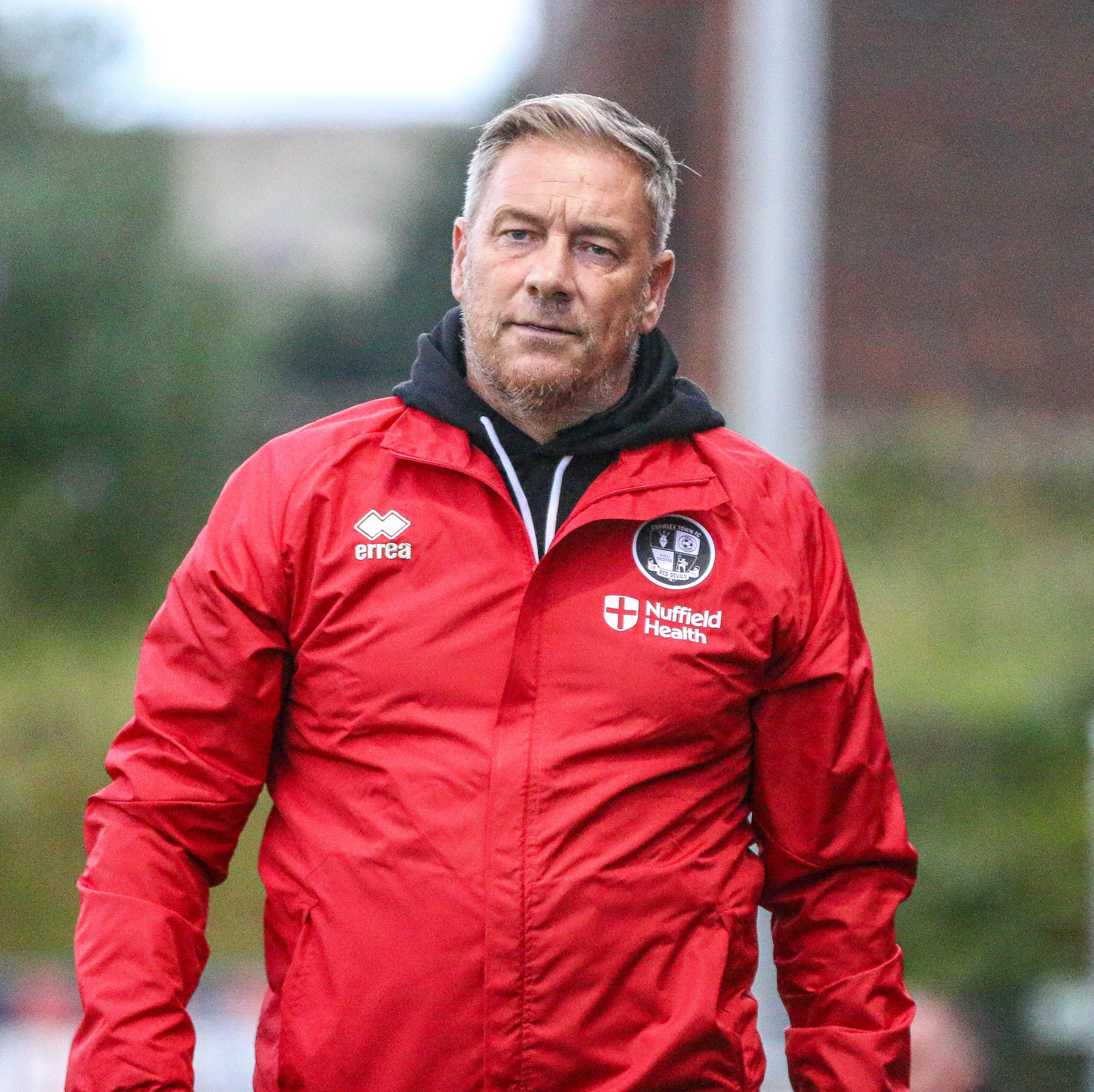
- Lindsey in 2024

Personal information
- Full name: Scott Lindsey
- Date of birth: 4 May 1972 (age 54)
- Place of birth: Walsall, England
- Position: Midfielder

Team information
- Current team: York City (head coach)

Senior career*
Years	Team	Apps	(Gls)
- Goole Town
1991–1992	Stafford Rangers	11	(0)
1992–1993	Burton Albion		
1993–1994	Sutton Coldfield Town		
1993–1994	Tamworth	14	(0)
1993–1994	Bridlington Town		
1994–1995	Gillingham	12	(0)
1995–1997	Dover Athletic	58	(2)
1997–1998	Sittingbourne		
- Ashford Town (Kent)
1998–1999	Canvey Island	46	(0)
1999–2001	Gravesend & Northfleet		
2001–2002	Welling United		
2002–2006	Folkestone Invicta		
2005–2006	Maidstone United		
2007–2008	Sittingbourne		
2008–2009	Folkestone Invicta		
2013–2014	Tamworth	0	(0)

Managerial career
- 2010: Lincoln City (caretaker)
- 2019–2021: Chatham Town
- 2022–2023: Swindon Town
- 2023–2024: Crawley Town
- 2024–2025: Milton Keynes Dons
- 2025–2026: Crawley Town
- 2026–: York City
- * Club domestic league appearances and goals

Scott Lindsey (born 4 May 1972) is an English professional football coach and former player who is the head coach of EFL League Two club York City. He has previously managed English Football League clubs Milton Keynes Dons, Swindon Town and Crawley Town. As a player, he played as a midfielder in the Football League, most notably for Gillingham.

== Playing career ==
Lindsey started his career with Goole Town before signing for Football Conference side Stafford Rangers and then having spells with Burton Albion and Sutton Coldfield Town. He later joined Tamworth, debuting in the 2–1 Southern Football League Midland division victory at Evesham United on 30 August 1993 and went on to make a total of 22 appearances for the club, (14 of which came in the Southern Football League before departing after a final appearance as a substitute in the 2–1 home league victory over Leicester United on 4 December 1993).

He moved on to join Bridlington Town before signing for Gillingham in July 1994 and made his debut for the club in the 1–0 home defeat to Carlisle United on 31 December 1994. Lindsey made 12 appearances in the league that season but failed to make the Gills team at the start of the following season and moved on to join Dover Athletic in October 1995 spending the next two seasons with the club before moving on to Sittingbourne and Ashford Town (Kent).

Lindsey played for Canvey Island, scoring his first goal for the club in a 3–0 Isthmian League First Division home victory over Wembley on 23 January 1999, before being released in September 1999 and joining Gravesend & Northfleet where he remained until spending the 2001–02 season with Welling United. In July 2002 he joined Folkestone Invicta, making his 100th start for the club in the FA Cup Second Qualifying Round Replay at home to Harrow Borough on 5 October 2004.

In January 2006, he joined Maidstone United debuting in the 2–0 Kentish Observer Football League Cup Group C victory at VCD Athletic on 24 January 2006. He joined Sittingbourne in March 2008, debuting as a second-half substitute in the 2–1 Isthmian League Division One South home defeat to Croydon Athletic on 8 March 2008.

== Coaching career ==
Lindsey rejoined Folkestone Invicta as a player/coach but left the club in January 2009 to become Technical Development Coach at Gillingham where his role was to set up Development Centres in and around Kent for young children while also working at the club's Centre of Excellence in Canterbury with the Under 9s right through to the Under 16s.

Following the appointment of Chris Sutton as manager of Lincoln City at the end of September 2009, Lindsey was appointed first-team coach at the club and would later serve as caretaker manager. On 18 May 2011 he departed Sincil Bank with his contract being cancelled by mutual consent following the club's relegation from The Football League.

He was appointed as the under 18s manager at Swindon Town in the summer of 2014. In June 2016 though he left Swindon to take on the role of assistant manager at Forest Green Rovers.

On 22 July 2021, Lindsey left Chatham Town and rejoined Swindon Town as assistant manager and was announced as the club's new head coach in June 2022 following the departure of Ben Garner for Charlton Athletic.

On 11 January 2023, when Swindon were eighth in League Two, Lindsey was appointed manager of another League Two side, Crawley Town, on an initial two-and-a-half-year contract. In his first season he kept the club up after a strong run of form towards the end of the season with survival confirmed after a 0–0 draw against Walsall. The club finished 22nd, their lowest finish since relegation from League One in 2015.

Lindsey was nominated for the EFL's September Manager of the Month for League Two following a successful month for Crawley with five wins and a draw with the team ending the month in second. In October 2023, Lindsey was linked with a move to manage former club Gillingham. Crawley reached the play-offs at the end of the season and defeated Milton Keynes Dons 8–1 on aggregate in the play-off semi-finals; delivering the club's first ever visit to Wembley Stadium and recording the largest play-off victory in Football League history. Lindsey led Crawley Town to promotion to League One after they won the League Two play-off final with a 2–0 win against Crewe Alexandra.

On 25 September 2024, Lindsey left Crawley Town to become manager of League Two club Milton Keynes Dons. He left Crawley with the club in 18th position in League One. He was sacked on 2 March 2025 following a poor run of results that left the club in 17th position, 3 points closer to the relegation zone than the playoff places.

Lindsey was re-appointed as Crawley manager on 21 March 2025, with Lindsey signing a contract until June 2028. He was sacked just over a year later, on 22 March 2026, after a 10-match winless streak left Crawley one point and two places above the League Two relegation places.

Lindsey was appointed as head coach of York City on 27 July 2026 following the sacking of Stuart Maynard.

== Personal life ==
Scott Lindsey is the son of the former Gillingham right-back Keith Lindsey and was described as "a chip off the old block in the same position and for the same club".

He was married to Hayley for 16 years until her death from cancer at the age of 44 in November 2019. The couple had three daughters. His brother Matthew died when crashing his motorcycle in November 1995 on his way back from watching Lindsey play in a match. Former England under-21 goalkeeper Alan Nicholls also died in the accident.

== Managerial statistics ==
As of match 21 November 2026

Managerial record by team and tenure
Team	From	To	Record					Ref.
Team	From	To	P	W	D	L	Win %	Ref.
Lincoln City (caretaker)	30 September 2010	17 October 2010	3	1	0	2	33.3	
Swindon Town	20 June 2022	11 January 2023	30	10	8	12	33.3	
Crawley Town	11 January 2023	25 September 2024	87	36	16	35	41.4	
Milton Keynes Dons	25 September 2024	2 March 2025	29	9	6	14	31.0	
Crawley Town	21 March 2025	22 March 2026	53	12	14	27	22.6	
York City	27 July 2026	present	21	7	7	7	33.3	
Total			223	75	51	97	33.6	

== Honours ==
=== As a manager ===
Crawley Town

- EFL League Two play-offs: 2024
