= Jack Roles =

English footballer (born 1999)

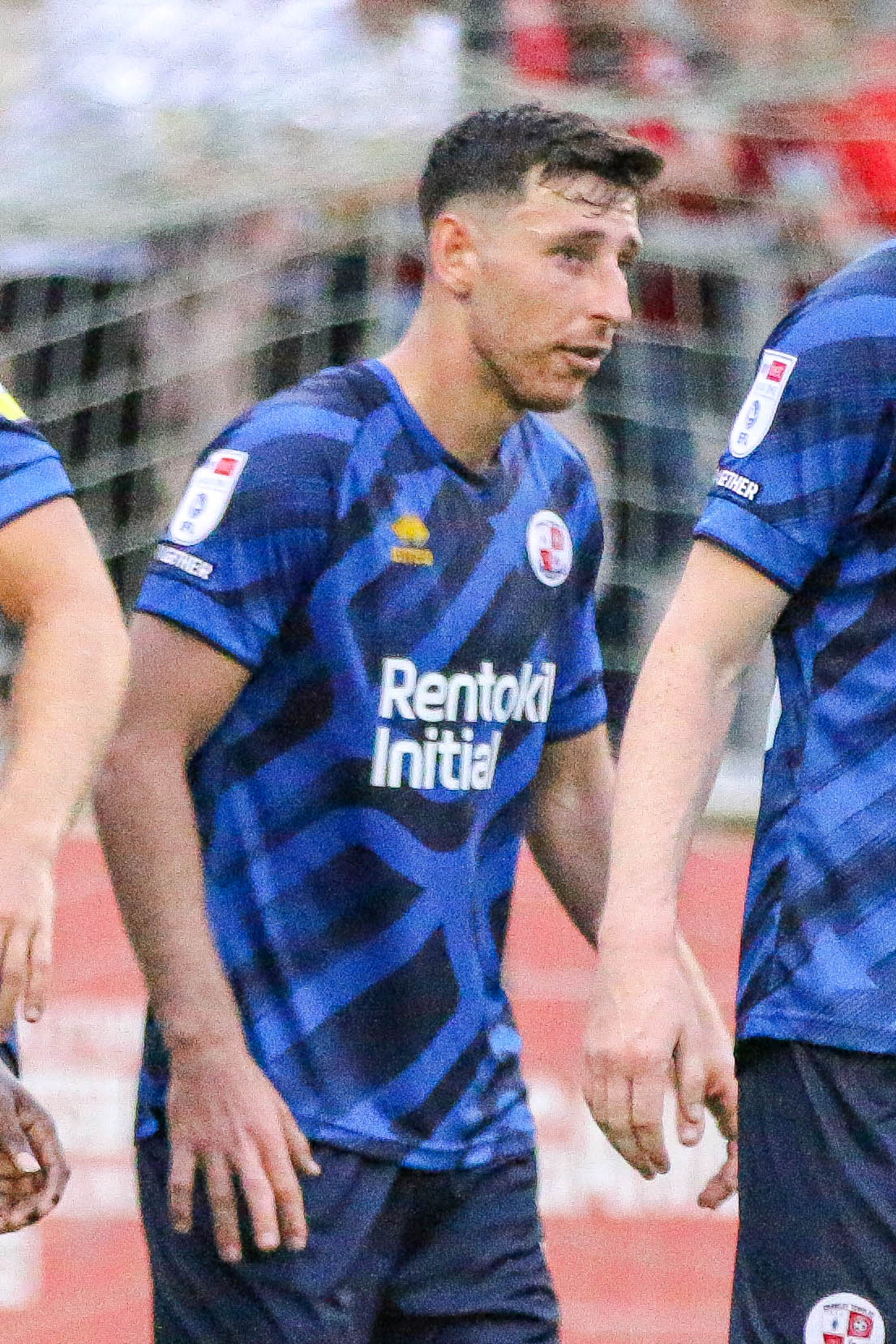
- Roles playing for Crawley Town in July 2024

Personal information
- Full name: Jack Roles
- Date of birth: 26 February 1999 (age 27)
- Place of birth: London, England
- Height: 6 ft 0 in (1.83 m)
- Position: Midfielder

Team information
- Current team: South Shields

Youth career
- 2015–2019: Tottenham Hotspur

Senior career*
Years	Team	Apps	(Gls)
2019–2021	Tottenham Hotspur	0	(0)
2019–2020	→ Cambridge United (loan)	23	(5)
2020	→ Burton Albion (loan)	2	(0)
2021	→ Stevenage (loan)	4	(0)
2021–2022	Crystal Palace	0	(0)
2022–2023	Woking	30	(2)
2023–2026	Crawley Town	75	(2)
2025	→ Gateshead (loan)	12	(3)
2026–	South Shields	23	(0)

International career
2017	Cyprus U19	2	(1)
2018–2020	Cyprus U21	6	(1)
- * Club domestic league appearances and goals as of 22:38, 18 October 2026 (UTC)

Jack Roles (born 26 February 1999) is a professional footballer who plays as a midfielder for National League North club South Shields. Born in England, he represents Cyprus at international level.

== Club career ==
=== Tottenham Hotspur ===
Roles was born in Enfield, London and attended Enfield Grammar School where he played for the school football team winning a number of trophies. Tottenham signed Roles to the academy in 2015. In June 2019 Roles had his contract with Tottenham extended until 2021.

Roles first appeared for Tottenham's senior team in the 2018–19 pre-season, appearing off of the bench in a friendly against Juventus.

In August 2019 Roles went out on loan to Cambridge United, who played in League Two. He was put straight into the squad for his Football League debut against Scunthorpe United, with Cambridge winning 3–2. His first senior goal came the following month against Mansfield Town, Cambridge's first in a 4–0 win.

Roles was named the league's player of the month for October 2019, and his 30-yard strike against Macclesfield Town was nominated for goal of the month too.

In September 2020 Roles went out on loan to Burton Albion of EFL League One.

On 1 February 2021, Roles joined League Two club Stevenage on loan.

On 27 May Tottenham announced that they had released Roles from his contract.

=== Crystal Palace ===
After a trial, Crystal Palace signed Roles on a free transfer. In January 2022, he left the club, having made six appearances for the under-23 team.

=== Woking ===
On 4 February 2022, Roles signed for National League side Woking. He subsequently made his Woking debut as a 90th-minute substitute in the 2–2 draw at Altrincham. Roles signed a new one-year deal at the end of the 2021–22 season.

=== Crawley Town ===
On 31 January 2023, Roles signed for League Two club Crawley Town for an undisclosed fee on an eighteen-month contract.

Roles appeared twice as a substitute in the 2024 EFL League Two play-offs as Crawley defeated Crewe Alexandra to secure promotion to League One, including scoring Crawley's fourth goal in their 5–1 semi-final second leg victory over Milton Keynes Dons.

He signed a new two-year deal with Crawley in June 2024.

On 5 February 2025, Roles joined National League side Gateshead on loan for the remainder of the season. He was recalled by Crawley Town on 4 April 2025.

On 2 February 2026, Roles departed Crawley Town by mutual consent.

=== South Shields ===
On 8 February 2026, Roles joined National League North leaders South Shields on an initial eighteen-month deal.

== International career ==
Born in England, Roles is of Cypriot descent through his mother. He is a youth international for Cyprus, having represented the Cyprus U19 and U21s.

== Career statistics ==
As of match played 5 April 2025

Appearances and goals by club, season and competition
Club	Season	League			FA Cup		League Cup		Other		Total	
Club	Season	Division	Apps	Goals	Apps	Goals	Apps	Goals	Apps	Goals	Apps	Goals
Tottenham Hotspur U23	2017–18	—			—		—		1 (Note: Appearance(s) in EFL Trophy)	0	1	0
Tottenham Hotspur U23	2018–19	—			—		—		3	1	3	1
Tottenham Hotspur U23	Total		—		—		—		4	1	4	1
Tottenham Hotspur	2019–20	Premier League	0	0	—		—		0	0	0	0
Tottenham Hotspur	2020–21	Premier League	0	0	—		0	0	0	0	0	0
Tottenham Hotspur	Total		0	0	—		0	0	0	0	0	0
Cambridge United (loan)	2019–20	League Two	23	5	1	0	1	0	0	0	25	5
Burton Albion (loan)	2020–21	League One	2	0	1	0	0	0	0	0	3	0
Stevenage (loan)	2020–21	League Two	2	0	—		—		—		2	0
Crystal Palace	2021–22	Premier League	0	0	0	0	0	0	—		0	0
Crystal Palace U23	2021–22	—			—		—		2	0	2	0
Woking	2021–22	National League	10	1	—		—		—		10	1
Woking	2022–23	National League	13	1	1	0	—		1 (Note: Appearance(s) in FA Trophy)	0	15	1
Woking	Total		23	2	1	0	—		1	0	25	2
Crawley Town	2022–23	League Two	9	0	—		—		0	0	9	0
Crawley Town	2023–24	League Two	30	2	0	0	0	0	7 (Note: Five appearances and three goals in EFL Trophy, two appearances and one goal in League Two play-offs)	4	37	6
Crawley Town	2024–25	League One	20	0	2	1	2	2	3	0	27	3
Crawley Town	2025–26	League Two	16	0	0	0	1	0	1	0	18	0
Crawley Town	Total		75	2	2	1	3	2	11	4	89	9
Gateshead (loan)	2024–25	National League	12	3	0	0	—		0	0	12	3
Career total			137	12	5	1	4	2	18	5	162	20

== Honours ==
Crawley Town

- EFL League Two play-offs: 2024
