= Laurence Maguire =

English footballer

Larry Maguire
Personal information
- Full name: Laurence Henry Maguire
- Date of birth: 8 February 1997 (age 29)
- Place of birth: Sheffield, England
- Height: 6 ft 2 in (1.88 m)
- Position: Centre-back

Team information
- Current team: Rochdale
- Number: 5

Youth career
- –2015: Chesterfield

Senior career*
Years	Team	Apps	(Gls)
2015–2024	Chesterfield	150	(7)
2017	→ AFC Fylde (loan)	5	(0)
2023–2024	→ Crawley Town (loan)	34	(3)
2024–2026	Milton Keynes Dons	37	(2)
2026–	Rochdale	0	(0)

International career^{‡}
2018–2019	England C	2	(0)
- * Club domestic league appearances and goals as of 21:30, 13 December 2025 (UTC) ‡ National team caps and goals as of 19:52, 20 March 2019 (UTC)

Laurence Henry Maguire (born 8 February 1997) is an English professional footballer who plays as a centre-back for EFL League Two club Rochdale.

== Club career ==
=== Chesterfield ===
Maguire started his career in the academy at Chesterfield, where he was the captain before being handed his first professional contract by the Spireites on 1 June 2015. He made his professional debut in the club's 2–1 EFL Trophy victory against Wolverhampton Wanderers U23 on 30 August 2016. He then made his League One debut in the 3–3 home draw with Gillingham on 27 September. He scored his first senior goal on 6 December in a 2–0 EFL Trophy win at Rochdale. On 10 May 2024, Chesterfield announced that Maguire would be released when his contract expired at the end of the season.

==== Loan to AFC Fylde ====
On 17 February 2017, Maguire was sent out on loan to AFC Fylde of National League North until 21 March. The next day, he made his debut in a 3–1 win over Brackley Town.

==== Loan to Crawley Town ====
On 30 August 2023, Maguire joined League Two side Crawley Town on loan until the end of January 2024. The deal was later extended until the end of the season.

=== Milton Keynes Dons ===
On 6 June 2024, Maguire agreed to join League Two club Milton Keynes Dons. He made his debut on 24 August 2024 in a 3–0 home win over Carlisle United. Maguire scored his first goal for the club on 16 November 2024, the winning goal in a 3–2 home win against Cheltenham Town with the team coming back from 0–2 down.

In his second season, Maguire saw limited opportunities under new coach Paul Warne, featuring ten times and scoring one goal across all competitions as the club achieved a second-placed finish and promotion to League One. He one of nine players to be released by the club at the end of the season.

== International career ==
In October 2018, Maguire was called up to the England C squad.

== Personal life ==
Maguire's older brothers, Joe and Harry, are also footballers. Joe plays for Glossop North End, and Harry plays for Manchester United and the England national team.

== Career statistics ==
As of 13 December 2025

Club statistics
Club	Season	League			FA Cup		League Cup		Other		Total	
Club	Season	Division	Apps	Goals	Apps	Goals	Apps	Goals	Apps	Goals	Apps	Goals
Chesterfield	2015–16	League One	0	0	0	0	0	0	0	0	0	0
Chesterfield	2016–17	League One	11	0	0	0	0	0	5 (Note: Appearances in EFL Trophy)	1	16	1
Chesterfield	2017–18	League Two	18	0	0	0	1	0	3	0	22	0
Chesterfield	2018–19	National League	26	1	3	1	—		0	0	29	2
Chesterfield	2019–20	National League	15	0	0	0	—		0	0	15	0
Chesterfield	2020–21	National League	40	1	1	0	—		3 (Note: Two appearances in FA Trophy, one appearance in National League play-offs)	0	44	1
Chesterfield	2021–22	National League	24	4	2	0	—		2 (Note: Appearances in National League play-offs)	0	28	4
Chesterfield	2022–23	National League	16	1	0	0	—		3 (Note: One appearance in FA Trophy, two appearances in National League play-offs)	0	19	1
Chesterfield	Total		150	7	6	1	1	0	16	1	173	9
AFC Fylde (loan)	2016–17	Conference North	5	0	—		—		0	0	5	0
Crawley Town (loan)	2023–24	League Two	34	3	1	0	0	0	4 (Note: One appearance in EFL Trophy, three appearances in League Two play-offs)	0	39	3
Milton Keynes Dons	2024–25	League Two	30	1	0	0	0	0	0	0	30	1
Milton Keynes Dons	2025–26	League Two	7	1	1	0	0	0	2	0	10	1
Milton Keynes Dons	Total		37	2	1	0	0	0	2	0	40	2
Career total			226	12	8	1	1	0	22	1	257	14

== Honours ==
Crawley Town

- EFL League Two play-offs: 2024

Milton Keynes Dons

- EFL League Two runner-up: 2025–26
