= Harry Ransom (footballer) =

English footballer (born 1999)

Personal information
- Full name: Harry William Dominique Ransom
- Date of birth: 1 October 1999 (age 27)
- Place of birth: Uckfield, England
- Height: 1.82 m (6 ft 0 in)
- Position: Defender

Team information
- Current team: Worthing
- Number: 12

Youth career
- 2016: Eastbourne Borough

Senior career*
Years	Team	Apps	(Gls)
2016–2019	Eastbourne Borough	72	(1)
2019–2021	Millwall	0	(0)
2020–2021	→ Dover Athletic (loan)	8	(1)
2021–2024	Crawley Town	40	(1)
2021–2022	→ Dover Athletic (loan)	37	(1)
2024–2025	Sutton United	17	(0)
2025–	Worthing	0	(0)
- * Club domestic league appearances and goals as of 18:27, 13 April 2025 (UTC)

Harry William Dominique Ransom (born 1 October 1999) is an English professional footballer who plays for Worthing, as a defender.

== Career ==
Born in Uckfield, Ransom began his career with Eastbourne Borough in 2016. In March 2019 it was announced that he would transfer to Millwall in the summer transfer window. He spent time on loan at Dover Athletic, before moving to Crawley Town in June 2021. He returned on loan to Dover in September 2021, and in January 2022 his loan was extended to the end of the season.

In May 2024, it was announced that Ransom's contract would not be renewed and he would be released by Crawley at the end of his contract.

On 28 June 2024, it was announced that Ransom would sign for National League club Sutton United upon the expiry of his Crawley contract.

On 24 June 2025, it was announced that Ransom would sign for Worthing upon the expiry of his Sutton United contract.

== Career statistics ==
As of end of 2023–24 season

Appearances and goals by club, season and competition
Club	Season	League			FA Cup		EFL Cup		Other		Total	
Club	Season	Division	Apps	Goals	Apps	Goals	Apps	Goals	Apps	Goals	Apps	Goals
Eastbourne Borough	2016–17	National League South	3	0	0	0	—		0	0	3	0
Eastbourne Borough	2017–18	National League South	31	0	0	0	—		1 (Note: Appearance(s) in FA Trophy)	0	32	0
Eastbourne Borough	2018–19	National League South	38	1	1	0	—		1	0	40	1
Eastbourne Borough	Total		72	1	1	0	0	0	2	0	75	1
Millwall	2019–20	EFL Championship	0	0	0	0	0	0	0	0	0	0
Millwall	2020–21	EFL Championship	0	0	0	0	0	0	0	0	0	0
Millwall	Total		0	0	0	0	0	0	0	0	0	0
Dover Athletic (loan)	2020–21	National League	8	1	0	0	—		1	0	9	1
Crawley Town	2021–22	EFL League Two	0	0	0	0	0	0	0	0	0	0
Crawley Town	2022–23	EFL League Two	20	0	1	0	2	0	1 (Note: Appearance(s) in EFL Trophy)	0	24	0
Crawley Town	2023–24	EFL League Two	20	1	0	0	1	0	5	0	26	1
Crawley Town	Total		40	1	1	0	3	0	6	0	50	1
Dover Athletic (loan)	2021–22	National League	37	1	1	0	—		1	0	39	1
Career total			157	4	3	0	3	0	10	0	173	4
