= Jayden Davis (footballer) =

English footballer (born 2001)

Personal information
- Full name: Jayden Kyle Andrew Davis
- Date of birth: 19 November 2001 (age 24)
- Place of birth: Croydon, England
- Height: 1.78 m (5 ft 10 in)
- Position: Midfielder

Team information
- Current team: Maidstone United
- Number: 7

Youth career
- Millwall

Senior career*
Years	Team	Apps	(Gls)
2021–2022	Millwall	0	(0)
2021	→ King's Lynn Town (loan)	4	(1)
2022–2024	Crawley Town	6	(0)
2023	→ Lewes (loan)	4	(0)
2023–2024	→ Farnborough (loan)	6	(0)
2024	→ Braintree Town (loan)	19	(3)
2024–2026	Eastbourne Borough	44	(7)
2025	→ Welling United (loan)	8	(2)
2026	→ King's Lynn Town (loan)	19	(3)
2026–	Maidstone United	0	(0)
- * Club domestic league appearances and goals as of 23:35, 11 April 2026 (UTC)

Jayden Kyle Andrew Davis (born 19 November 2001) is an English professional footballer who plays for National League South club Maidstone United as a midfielder.

== Career ==
Davis began his career with Millwall and spent time on loan at King's Lynn Town before signing a one-year contract with Crawley Town in July 2022 following a trial. The club's fans had voted to sign Davis. After making his debut for the club in August 2022, his next appearance came in October, where he scored and gained an assist.

In March 2023, Davis joined Isthmian League Premier Division side Lewes on loan.

On 25 August 2023, he joined National League South side, Farnborough on a season-long loan.

On 16 January 2024, after spending the first half of the season with Farnborough, Davis joined Braintree Town in another loan deal.

On 28 May 2024, Davis agreed to join Eastbourne Borough ahead of the 2024–25 season, after the expiration of his Crawley Town contract. In January 2025 he moved on loan to Welling United.

On 11 June 2026, Davis joined National League South club Maidstone United ahead of the 2026–27 season.

== Career statistics ==
As of match played 11 April 2026

Appearances and goals by club, season and competition
Club	Season	League			FA Cup		League Cup		Other		Total	
Club	Season	Division	Apps	Goals	Apps	Goals	Apps	Goals	Apps	Goals	Apps	Goals
Millwall	2021–22	Championship	0	0	—		0	0	—		0	0
King's Lynn Town (loan)	2021–22	National League	4	1	1	0	—		0	0	5	1
Crawley Town	2022–23	League Two	6	0	1	0	2	0	1 (Note: Appearance(s) in EFL Trophy)	1	10	1
Crawley Town	2023–24	League Two	0	0	0	0	0	0	0	0	0	0
Crawley Town	Total		6	0	1	0	2	0	1	1	10	1
Lewes (loan)	2022–23	Isthmian League Premier Division	4	0	—		—		—		4	0
Farnborough (loan)	2023–24	National League South	6	0	2	0	—		0	0	8	0
Braintree Town (loan)	2023–24	National League South	19	3	—		—		3 (Note: Appearance(s) in National League South play-offs)	1	22	4
Eastbourne Borough	2024–25	National League South	30	4	1	0	—		6 (Note: One appearance in National League South play-offs, two appearances in FA Trophy, three appearances in Sussex Senior Cup)	0	37	4
Eastbourne Borough	2025–26	National League South	14	3	2	0	—		1 (Note: Appearance in Sussex Senior Cup)	0	17	3
Eastbourne Borough	Total		44	7	3	0	0	0	7	0	54	7
Welling United (loan)	2024–25	National League South	8	2	—		—		0	0	8	2
King's Lynn Town (loan)	2025–26	National League North	19	3	—		—		0	0	19	3
Career total			110	16	7	0	2	0	11	2	130	18

== Honours ==
Braintree Town

- National League South play-offs: 2024
