= Ben Wells (footballer, born 2000) =

English footballer (born 2000)

Personal information
- Full name: Ben Michael Wells
- Date of birth: 29 February 2000 (age 26)
- Position: Defender

Team information
- Current team: Cray Wanderers

Youth career
- West Ham United
- 2018–2019: Queens Park Rangers

Senior career*
Years	Team	Apps	(Gls)
2019–2020	Concord Rangers	10	(0)
2021–2022	Welling United	8	(0)
2022–2023	Crawley Town	5	(0)
2023–2024	Billericay Town	12	(1)
2024	Welling United	10	(0)
2024–2025	Hastings United	19	(1)
2025	Margate	1	(0)
2025–	Cray Wanderers	1	(0)
- * Club domestic league appearances and goals as of 15:59, 7 September 2025 (UTC)

Ben Michael Wells (born 29 February 2000) is an English professional footballer who plays as a defender for Isthmian League Premier Division club Cray Wanderers.

== Career ==
Wells played youth football for West Ham United and Queens Park Rangers, and in non-league for Concord Rangers and Welling United, before signing a one-year contract with Crawley Town in July 2022 following a trial. He was released at the end of the 2022–23 season, having made 5 league appearances.

In September 2023, Wells joined Isthmian League Premier Division club Billericay Town.

In June 2024, Wells returned to National League South side Welling United. In December 2024, he joined Hastings United. He departed the club in April 2025.

In June 2025, Wells joined Isthmian League South East Division side Margate. He joined Cray Wanderers in September 2025.
