= Nick Tsaroulla =

Cypriot-English footballer (born 1999)

Personal information
- Full name: Nicholas Andrew Tsaroulla
- Date of birth: 29 March 1999 (age 27)
- Place of birth: Bristol, England
- Height: 5 ft 10 in (1.78 m)
- Position: Wing back

Team information
- Current team: Notts County
- Number: 25

Youth career
- –2011: Whetstone Wanderers
- 2011–2018: Tottenham Hotspur
- 2019–2020: Brentford

Senior career*
Years	Team	Apps	(Gls)
2020–2024	Crawley Town	115	(9)
2024–	Notts County	80	(6)

International career^{‡}
2019	Cyprus U21	1	(0)
2026–	Cyprus	3	(0)
- * Club domestic league appearances and goals as of 18:15, 8 July 2026 (UTC) ‡ National team caps and goals as of 18:50, 5 October 2026 (UTC)

Nicholas Andrew Tsaroulla (born 29 March 1999) is a professional footballer who plays as a wing back for EFL League One club Notts County. Born in England, he plays for the Cyprus national team.

== Club career ==
=== Early years ===
A left back, Tsaroulla began his career with Whetstone Wanderers and moved to the Tottenham Hotspur academy at the age of 12. Tsaroulla had a successful career with the U18 team (winning the 2014 South Korea Cup and the 2016 IMG Cup) and progressed into the Development Squad, but the effects of a car crash suffered in July 2017 saw him released at the end of the 2017–18 season. He subsequently spent a year out of football in rehabilitation.

=== Brentford ===
On 9 May 2019, Tsaroulla joined the B team at Championship club Brentford on a free transfer and signed a one-year contract, with the option of a further year. He made 31 B team appearances during his single season with the club.

=== Crawley Town ===
After six weeks' training with Crawley Town, Tsaroulla signed a one-year contract with the League Two club on 10 October 2020, with the option of a further season. He made the first professional appearance of his career as a substitute in 2–0 EFL Trophy win over Ipswich Town on 10 November 2020 and made his league debut in a 1–1 away draw with Colchester United one month later. Tsaroulla scored the first senior goal of his career in his seventh appearance with the opener in a 3–0 FA Cup third-round victory over Premier League side Leeds United on 10 January 2021. In the post-match interview, Tsaroulla was left "almost in tears", stating that "the darkest days of pain came out as it went in". After scoring once in 21 appearances across a mid-table 2020–21 campaign, he won the club's Young Player of the Season and Goal of the Season awards. On 11 May 2021, he signed a new two-year contract with an option for a further year. He would make his 100th appearance for the club in a 3–1 loss away to Notts County.

=== Notts County ===
On 19 June 2024, he joined Notts County on a two-year contract with an option for a third year.

== International career ==
In 2019, Tsaroulla was capped by Cyprus at U21 level.

In September 2026, Tsaroulla received his first senior call-up to the Cyprus senior team.

== Personal life ==
Tsaroulla is of Cypriot descent and grew up in Winchmore Hill in north London. He attended Southgate School in Oakwood.

== Career statistics ==
As of match played 8 March 2025

Appearances and goals by club, season and competition
Club	Season	League			FA Cup		EFL Cup		Other		Total	
Club	Season	Division	Apps	Goals	Apps	Goals	Apps	Goals	Apps	Goals	Apps	Goals
Crawley Town	2020–21	League Two	17	0	3	1	0	0	1 (Note: Appearance in EFL Trophy)	0	21	1
Crawley Town	2021–22	League Two	27	3	0	0	0	0	1	0	28	3
Crawley Town	2022–23	League Two	28	2	0	0	2	0	0	0	30	2
Crawley Town	2023–24	League Two	43	4	1	0	0	0	5 (Note: Two appearances and two goals in EFL Trophy, three appearances in League Two play-offs)	2	49	6
Crawley Town	Total		115	9	4	1	2	0	7	2	128	12
Notts County	2024–25	League Two	38	2	1	0	0	0	2	0	41	2
Career total			153	11	5	1	2	0	9	2	169	14

=== International ===
As of match played 5 October 2026

Appearances and goals by national team and year
National team	Year	Apps	Goals
Cyprus	2026	3	0
Total		3	0

== Honours ==
Crawley Town

- EFL League Two play-offs: 2024

Notts County

- EFL League Two play-offs: 2026
