= Corey Addai =

English footballer (born 1997)

Personal information
- Full name: Corey Kofi Cheremeh Addai
- Date of birth: 10 October 1997 (age 29)
- Place of birth: Hackney, England
- Height: 6 ft 8 in (2.03 m) (Note: Different sources give different heights. 11v11.com lists his height at 6 feet 4 inches (1.93 m), Derbyshire Times listed it as 6 feet 7 inches (2.01 m) in 2020, The News (Portsmouth) listed it as 6 feet 8 inches (2.03 m), which was also claimed by Stockport County director of football Simon Wilson in 2024.)
- Position: Goalkeeper

Team information
- Current team: Burton Albion (on loan from Stockport County)
- Number: 34

Youth career
- 2007–2014: Arsenal
- 2014–2016: Coventry City

Senior career*
Years	Team	Apps	(Gls)
2016–2020	Coventry City	0	(0)
2018	→ Hendon (loan)	3	(0)
2018	→ Dulwich Hamlet (loan)		
2019	→ AFC Telford United (loan)	7	(0)
2019	→ Redditch United (loan)	3	(0)
2020–2021	Barnsley	0	(0)
2020–2021	→ Chesterfield (loan)	2	(0)
2021–2022	Esbjerg fB	4	(0)
2022–2024	Crawley Town	71	(0)
2024–	Stockport County	50	(0)
2026–	→ Burton Albion (loan)	16	(0)
- * Club domestic league appearances and goals as of 11:25, 22 November 2026 (UTC)

Corey Kofi Cheremeh Addai (born 10 October 1997) is an English professional footballer who plays as a goalkeeper for Burton Albion on loan from EFL League One club Stockport County.

Addai played youth football for Arsenal, prior to joining Coventry City in 2014 signing a professional contract two years later. He had loan spells at Hendon, Dulwich Hamlet, AFC Telford United and Redditch United before leaving the club in January 2020. He spent the 2020–21 season with Barnsley, spending a short spell on loan at Chesterfield, and spent the following season in Denmark with Esbjerg fB. He signed for EFL League Two club Crawley Town in summer 2022.

== Club career ==
=== Coventry City ===
Born in London, Addai was scouted for Arsenal's academy as a goalkeeper aged 10, having played in the position in a Sunday league game despite usually playing outfield. He joined Coventry City in 2014, signing his first professional contract with the club two years later. He joined Hendon on a youth loan in January 2018. He made five appearances for the club in all competitions. He joined Isthmian League Premier Division club Dulwich Hamlet on loan in March 2018. Addai scored a 90th-minute winner for the club with a free-kick from inside his own half in their 1–0 Velocity Trophy semi-final win over Brentwood Town on 7 March 2018. On 10 April 2018, he was recalled from his loan, having made 7 appearances.

On 26 July 2019, it was announced that Addai would join AFC Telford United on a month's loan from 2 August to 2 September. He made seven league appearances on loan at the club. On 12 September 2019, he joined Southern League club Redditch United on loan until January 2020. He made three league appearances for the club. Addai left Coventry at the end of January 2020 after his contract was cancelled by mutual consent.

=== Barnsley ===
Addai joined Barnsley in September 2020 following a trial at the club. In November 2020, he joined National League club Chesterfield on a one-month loan. He made two appearances on loan at the club. He was released by Barnsley at the end of the season.

=== Esbjerg fB ===
In September 2021, he joined Danish Danish 1st Division club Esbjerg fB on a one-year deal, having spent the 2021–22 pre-season on trial at Portsmouth. He made four league appearances over the course of the 2021–22 season.

=== Crawley Town ===
Addai signed for Crawley Town in July 2022. On 30 July 2022, he debuted for Crawley during a 0–1 loss to Carlisle.

=== Stockport County ===
On 27 June 2024, Addai signed with EFL League One club Stockport County for an undisclosed fee on a three-year contract.

On 15 July 2026, Addai joined Burton Albion on loan for the 2026–27 season.

== International career ==
Born in England, Addai was called up to the Jamaica national team in May 2022, and made his unofficial debut in a 6–0 loss to Catalonia in the same month, replacing Dillon Barnes in the 56th minute.

== Personal life ==
Addai was born in England to a Ghanaian father and Jamaican mother.

== Honours ==
Crawley Town

- EFL League Two play-offs: 2024

Stockport County

- EFL Trophy runner-up: 2025–26
