= Klaidi Lolos =

Greek footballer (born 2000)

Personal information
- Full name: Klaidi Lolos
- Date of birth: 6 October 2000 (age 26)
- Place of birth: Athens, Greece
- Height: 1.88 m (6 ft 2 in)
- Position: Midfielder

Team information
- Current team: Rotherham United (on loan from Peterborough United)
- Number: 20

Youth career
- 2009–2011: Olympiacos
- 2015–2017: Crystal Palace
- 2017–2019: Plymouth Argyle

Senior career*
Years	Team	Apps	(Gls)
2019–2021	Plymouth Argyle	12	(0)
2019–2020	→ Dorchester Town (loan)	9	(4)
2020	→ Chippenham Town (loan)	1	(0)
2021–2022	Torquay United	28	(2)
2022–2023	Oxford City	35	(16)
2023–2024	Crawley Town	46	(13)
2024–2025	Bolton Wanderers	24	(2)
2025–	Peterborough United	7	(0)
2026	→ Crawley Town (loan)	12	(1)
2026–	→ Rotherham United (loan)	0	(0)

International career
2018	Greece U19	2	(1)
- * Club domestic league appearances and goals as of 23:56, 1 September 2026 (BST)

Klaidi Lolos (Greek: Κλάιντι Λώλος; Albanian: Klajdi Lolo; born 6 October 2000) is a Greek professional footballer who plays as a midfielder for EFL League Two side Rotherham United on loan from EFL League One club Peterborough United.

He has previously played for Plymouth Argyle where he had loan spells at Dorchester Town and Chippenham Town before joining Torquay United. After Torquay he played for Oxford City, Crawley Town and Bolton Wanderers.

== Early life ==
Lolos was born in Cholargos, Greece, a suburb of Athens. He is of Albanian descent. His family moved to Southgate, England when Lolos was 12 years old.

== Club career ==
=== Early career ===
Before leaving Greece, Lolos was in the youth academy of Olympiacos. He had trials with Brentford, Reading, Norwich City and Liverpool before he joined Crystal Palace's academy in 2015.

=== Plymouth Argyle ===
Lolos joined Plymouth Argyle in 2017 on a youth apprenticeship, having previously been at Crystal Palace. He was scouted by Argyle academy director Kevin Hodges whilst he was on trial at Birmingham City. He was part of the Argyle Youth team who performed well in the 2017–18 FA Youth Cup, notably beating Manchester City on penalties in the third round. Lolos opened the scoring in the fifth round against Fulham, but that was where Argyle's run ended as the match finished in a 3–1 loss after extra time.

On 15 December 2018, Lolos, along with teammate Aaron Goulty, was substituted off ill in an EFL Youth Alliance match against Portsmouth, which was being played in torrential conditions. The match was later postponed, after just 57 minutes had been played.

He first featured in a professional squad for Argyle in a 5–2 EFL League One defeat to Gillingham on 5 May 2018, where he appeared on the substitutes bench but did not come on.

In November 2019, Lolos joined Dorchester Town, of the Southern League Premier South on a two-month loan deal. He went on to play nine games for the Magpies, scoring four goals.

He signed a professional contract ahead of the 2019–20 season. Lolos made his professional debut as a substitute in Argyle's 1–0 away defeat to Newport County on 17 August 2019. On 8 September 2020 he scored his first goal for Plymouth in an EFL Trophy tie against Norwich City U21s.

On 11 December 2020, Lolos joined Chippenham Town on a one-month loan, alongside fellow Argyle youngster Ryan Law. He was sent off in his first and only game for the club and the loan was not extended.

Lolos was released by Plymouth Argyle at the end of the 2020-21 season after making eight substitute appearances without scoring in League One and two starts in the Papa John's EFL Trophy where he scored one goal against Norwich City U21s.

=== Torquay United ===
Lolos was announced as a new signing for Torquay United on 19 July 2021. Lolos was released by the club after one season.

=== Oxford City ===
In July 2022, Lolos joined National League South club Oxford City having spent time with the club on trial.

=== Crawley Town ===
On 15 July 2023, Lolos signed for League Two club Crawley Town on a two-year contract.

=== Bolton Wanderers ===
On 28 June 2024, he joined EFL League One side Bolton Wanderers on a three-year contract.

=== Peterborough United ===
On 1 August 2025, Lolos signed for fellow League One club Peterborough United on a three-year deal for an undisclosed fee.

On 9 January 2026, he returned to League Two club Crawley Town on loan for the remainder of the season. On 4 May 2026, Lolos was transfer listed.

On 1 September 2026, Lolos joined Rotherham United on loan until the end of the season.

== International career ==
Having previously been invited on international training camps, on 12 February 2019 Lolos scored his first goal for the Greece U19 team, in a 2–0 friendly win against Romania.

== Honours ==
Crawley Town

- EFL League Two play-offs: 2024
