= 2024–25 Barrow A.F.C. season =

124th season in existence of Barrow AFC

Barrow
2024–25 season
- Chairman: Paul Hornby
- Head coach: Stephen Clemence (until 18 January); Andy Whing (from 20 January)
- Stadium: Holker Street
- League Two: 16th
- FA Cup: First round
- EFL Cup: Third round
- EFL Trophy: Group stage
- Top goalscorer: League: Emile Acquah (6); All: Emile Acquah (7)
- Highest home attendance: 4,665 vs Morecambe, 12 October 2024
- Lowest home attendance: 539 vs Aston Villa U21, 29 October 2024
Home colours	Away colours

The 2024–25 season was the 124th season in the history of Barrow and their fifth consecutive season in League Two. In addition to the domestic league, the club also participated in the FA Cup, the EFL Cup, and the EFL Trophy.

== Players ==
=== Current squad ===
As of 24 January 2025

Note: Flags indicate national team as defined under FIFA eligibility rules; some limited exceptions apply. Players may hold more than one non-FIFA nationality.

No.	Pos.	Nation	Player
1	GK	ENG	Paul Farman
4	MF	SCO	Dean Campbell
5	DF	SCO	Kyle Cameron (on loan from Notts County)
6	DF	IRL	Niall Canavan (captain)
7	MF	ENG	David Worrall
8	MF	ENG	Kian Spence
9	FW	ENG	Tyler Smith (on loan from Bradford City)
10	FW	ENG	Ged Garner
11	FW	ENG	Elliot Newby
12	GK	ENG	Luke Daniels
15	MF	ENG	Robbie Gotts
16	MF	IRL	Sam Foley
17	FW	ENG	Katia Kouyaté
18	DF	ENG	Sam Barnes

No.	Pos.	Nation	Player
19	FW	ENG	Dom Telford
20	FW	ENG	Emile Acquah
21	GK	ENG	Wyll Stanway
22	FW	WAL	Chris Popov (on loan from Leicester City)
23	MF	ENG	Connor Mahoney
25	MF	ENG	Charlie Kirk
26	MF	ENG	Isaac Fletcher
29	DF	ENG	Junior Tiensia
30	DF	ENG	Ben Jackson
33	FW	SCO	Aaron Pressley (on loan from Stevenage)
39	DF	USA	Leo Duru (on loan from Blackburn Rovers)
42	DF	ENG	Theo Vassell
14	DF	WAL	MJ Williams

== Transfers ==
=== In ===
Date	Pos.	Player	From	Fee	Ref.
14 June 2024 (Note: The transfer was announced on 23 May, and would become official on June 14 once the transfer window re-opened)	GK	Wyll Stanway (ENG)	Chester (ENG)	Undisclosed	
1 July 2024 (Note: The transfer was announced on 18 June, and would become official on July 1 once his Blackburn Rovers contract expired)	CB	Sam Barnes (ENG)	Blackburn Rovers (ENG)	Free	
1 July 2024 (Note: The transfer was announced on 5 June, and would become official on July 1 once his Everton contract expired)	CF	Katia Kouyate (ENG)	Everton (ENG)	Free	
1 July 2024 (Note: The transfer was announced on 18 June, and would become official on July 1 once his Huddersfield Town contract expired)	RW	Connor Mahoney (ENG)	Huddersfield Town (ENG)	Free	
14 July 2024	CB	Theo Vassell (ENG)	Salford City (ENG)	Free	
30 July 2024	LB	Ben Jackson (ENG)	Huddersfield Town (ENG)	Undisclosed	
5 August 2024	CB	Chris Stokes (ENG)	Morecambe (ENG)	Free	
2 September 2024	CM	Charlie Weston (ENG) (Note: Signed initially for the 'B team)	Blackburn Rovers (ENG)	Free	
22 October 2024	LW	Charlie Kirk (ENG)	Crewe Alexandra (ENG)	Free	
2 January 2025	CM	Isaac Fletcher (ENG)	Spennymoor Town (ENG)	Undisclosed	
10 January 2025	CF	Josh Shamalo (ENG)	Barton Rovers (ENG)	Undisclosed	
23 January 2025	DM	MJ Williams (WAL)	Milton Keynes Dons (ENG)	Undisclosed	

=== Out ===
Date	Pos	Player	To	Fee	Ref.
3 December 2024	CM	Charlie Weston (ENG)	Rochdale (ENG)	Free	
28 January 2025	RB	Rory Feely (IRL)	Crawley Town (ENG)	Undisclosed	

=== Loaned in ===
Date	Pos.	Player	From	Date until	Ref.
1 July 2024 (Note: The loan was announced on 27 June, and would officially commence on July 1)	CF	Andrew Dallas (SCO)	Barnsley (ENG)	15 January 2025 (Note: On 15 January, Dallas was recalled back to his parent club Barnsley)	
30 July 2024	RB	Neo Eccleston (ENG)	Huddersfield Town (ENG)	15 January 2025 (Note: On 15 January, Eccleston was recalled back to his parent club Huddersfield)	
30 August 2024	AM	Chris Popov (WAL)	Leicester City (ENG)	End of Season	
5 January 2025	CB	Kyle Cameron (SCO)	Notts County (ENG)	End of Season	
9 January 2025	RB	Leo Duru (USA)	Blackburn Rovers (ENG)	End of Season	
9 January 2025	CF	Aaron Pressley (SCO)	Stevenage (ENG)	End of Season	
17 January 2025	CF	Tyler Smith (ENG)	Bradford City (ENG)	End of Season	
3 February 2025	CM	Ben Whitfield (ENG)	Burton Albion (ENG)	End of Season	

=== Loaned out ===
Date	Pos.	Player	To	Date until	Ref.
10 January 2025	CB	Mazeed Ogungbo (IRL)	Hemel Hempstead Town (ENG)	End of Season	
10 January 2025	CF	Josh Shamalo (ENG)	Eastbourne Borough (ENG)	End of Season	
31 January 2025	CF	Dom Telford (ENG)	Barnet (ENG)	End of Season	
3 February 2025	CF	Gerard Garner (ENG)	Morecambe (ENG)	End of Season	
25 February 2025	RM	David Worrall (ENG)	Kidderminster Harriers (ENG)	End of Season (Note: On 24 March, Worrall's loan at Kidderminster was extended until the end of season)	

=== Released / Out of Contract ===
Date	Pos.	Player	Subsequent club	Join date	Ref.
30 June 2024	RB	Tyrell Warren (ENG)	Grimsby Town (ENG)	1 July 2024	
30 June 2024	CM	Ben Whitfield (ENG)	Burton Albion (ENG)	1 July 2024	
30 June 2024	CF	Sam Bellis (ENG)	Waterford (IRL)	3 July 2024	
30 June 2024	CB	George Ray (WAL)	Morecambe (ENG)	12 July 2024	
30 June 2024	CM	Tom White (ENG)	Morecambe (ENG)	12 July 2024	
30 June 2024	CB	James Chester (WAL)	Salford City (ENG)	17 July 2024	
30 June 2024	CM	Owen Bray (IRL)	FC Halifax Town (ENG)	9 August 2024	
30 June 2024	CF	Courtney Duffus (IRL)	Macclesfield (ENG)	19 August 2024	
30 June 2024	GK	Josh Lillis (ENG)			
30 June 2024	CB	Malakai Reeve (ENG)			
30 June 2024	CF	Jamie Proctor (ENG)	Retired		

== Pre-season and friendlies ==
On 17 June, Barrow announced their pre-season schedule, with fixtures against Holker Old Boys, FC United of Manchester, Kilmarnock, Stockport County, Real Unión, AFC Fylde and Wigan Athletic.

Win Draw Loss Fixtures

6 July 2024 Friendly	Holker Old Boys	1–5	Barrow	Barrow-in-Furness
15:00 BST	43'	Report	Telford 8'; Worrall 48'; Garner 77', 88'; Acquah 90'	Stadium: Rakesmoor

13 July 2024 Friendly	FC United of Manchester	0–3	Barrow	Moston
15:00 BST		Report	Garner (x2); Acquah	Stadium: Broadhurst Park; Attendance: 578

19 July 2024 Friendly	Kilmarnock	5–0	Barrow	Kilmarnock, Scotland
19:00 BST	Wright 25'; Armstrong 47' (pen.), 65' (pen.); Watkins 49'; Murray 66'	Report		Stadium: Rugby Park

23 July 2024 Friendly	Barrow	Cancelled	Stockport County	Barrow-in-Furness
19:45 BST				Stadium: Holker Street
Note: Fixture was cancelled on request from the visitors.

27 July 2024 Friendly	Barrow	2–2	Real Unión	Barrow-in-Furness
15:00 BST	Mahoney; Feely	Report	Dominguez; Ayon	Stadium: Holker Street; Attendance: 1,374

30 July 2024 Friendly	Barrow	0–1	AFC Fylde	Barrow-in-Furness
19:45 BST		Report	Evans 78'	Stadium: Holker Street; Attendance: 749

3 August 2024 Friendly	Barrow	1–0	Wigan Athletic	Barrow-in-Furness
15:00 BST	Acquah	Report		Stadium: Holker Street; Attendance: 1,538

== Competitions ==
=== League Two ===
==== League table ====
Pos	Team	Pld	W	D	L	GF	GA	GD	Pts
14	Fleetwood Town	46	15	15	16	60	60	0	60
15	Cheltenham Town	46	16	12	18	60	70	−10	60
16	Barrow	46	15	14	17	52	50	+2	59
17	Gillingham	46	14	16	16	41	46	−5	58
18	Harrogate Town	46	14	11	21	43	61	−18	53

Source: EFL Official Website
Rules for classification: 1) Points; 2) Goal difference; 3) Number of goals scored; 4) Head-to-head results; 5) Wins; 6) Away goals; 7) Penalty points (sec 9.5); 8) 12-point sending off offences

==== Results summary ====
Overall								Home						Away					
Pld	W	D	L	GF	GA	GD	Pts	W	D	L	GF	GA	GD	W	D	L	GF	GA	GD
44	15	12	17	49	47	+2	57	10	6	6	31	19	+12	5	6	11	18	28	−10

Last updated: 21 April 2025.
Source: Soccerway

==== Results by round ====
Round	1	2	3	4	5	6	7	8	9	10	11	12	13	14	15	16	17	18	20	21	22	23	24	25	27	28	29	30	31	19^{1}	32	33	34	35	36	37	38	26^{2}	39	40	41	42	43	44
Ground	H	A	H	A	H	A	H	A	A	H	H	A	H	A	H	H	A	A	A	H	A	A	H	H	A	H	H	A	H	H	A	A	H	A	H	A	A	A	H	H	A	H	A	H
Result	W	L	W	W	D	W	W	L	L	W	L	L	D	D	D	L	L	D	L	W	L	D	D	L	L	W	L	L	W	W	L	L	L	W	W	D	D	W	L	D	W	W	D	D
Position	8	14	3	3	3	3	1	3	4	3	6	7	8	9	11	12	12	13	14	15	17	17	15	15	18	16	18	18	18	18	18	18	18	17	16	17	17	16	16	15	15	15	15	14
Points	3	3	6	9	10	13	16	16	16	19	19	19	20	21	22	22	22	23	23	26	26	27	28	28	28	31	31	31	34	37	37	37	37	40	43	44	45	48	48	49	52	55	56	57

Source: EFL
A = Away; H = Home; W = Win; D = Draw; L = Loss; P = Postponed
Notes:
- ^{1} Matchday 19 (vs. Milton Keynes Dons) was postponed due to spectator and player safety concerns from Storm Darragh.
- ^{2} Matchday 26 (vs. Port Vale) was postponed due to a frozen pitch.

==== Matches ====
On 26 June, the League Two fixtures were announced.

Win Draw Loss Fixtures

10 August 2024 1	Barrow	1–0	Crewe Alexandra	Barrow-in-Furness
15:00 BST	Vassell 22'; Spence (yellow card) 37'; Dallas (yellow card) 90+1'; Farman (yellow card) 90+3'	Report	Thomas (yellow card) 39'; Hemmings (yellow card) 90+8'	Stadium: Holker Street; Attendance: 3,585; Referee: Martin Coy

17 August 2024 2	Carlisle United	1–0	Barrow	Carlisle
12:30 BST	Wyke (yellow card) 24'; Adu-Adjei 35'; Hayden (yellow card) 43'; Barclay (yellow card) 62'; Davies (yellow card) 82'; Vela (yellow card) 90+5'	Report	Vassell (yellow card) 37'; Gotts (yellow card) 45+2'	Stadium: Brunton Park; Attendance: 9,813; Referee: Matthew Corlett
Note: Fixture was initially scheduled for a 15:00 kick-off, but was moved for live Sky Sports broadcast.

24 August 2024 3	Barrow	4–0	Port Vale	Barrow-in-Furness
15:00 BST	Garner 54'; Acquah 79'; Spence 81'; Telford 90+5'	Report	Croasdale (yellow card) 47'	Stadium: Holker Street; Attendance: 3,481; Referee: Declan Bourne

31 August 2024 4	Harrogate Town	0–1	Barrow	Harrogate
15:00 BST	Daly (yellow card) 54'; Asare (yellow card) 59'; Duke-McKenna (yellow card) 70'; Foulds (yellow card) 73'	Report	Eccleston 74'; Gotts (yellow card) 85'	Stadium: Wetherby Road; Attendance: 2,270; Referee: Scott Simpson

7 September 2024 5	Barrow	1–1	Swindon Town	Barrow-in-Furness
15:00 BST	Garner 35'; Farman (red card) 42'; Newby (yellow card) 55'	Report	Wright (yellow card) 42'; Kilkenny (yellow card) 61'; Smith (red card) 65'; Butterworth 90+8'	Stadium: Holker Street; Attendance: 3,763; Referee: Zac Kennard-Kettle

14 September 2024 6	Grimsby Town	1–2	Barrow	Cleethorpes
15:00 BST	Green 45+3', (yellow card) 77'; Ainley (yellow card) 86'; Wilson (yellow card) 90+3'	Report	Campbell (yellow card) 5'; Foley 14'; Vassell 26'; Telford (yellow card) 68'; Feely (yellow card) 90+3'	Stadium: Blundell Park; Attendance: 5,496; Referee: Ruebyn Ricardo

21 September 2024 7	Barrow	2–0	Newport County	Barrow-in-Furness
15:00 GMT	Newby 27'; Vassell 82'; Eccleston (yellow card) 89'	Report	Glennon (yellow card) 21'; K. Evans (yellow card) 49'; C. Evans (yellow card) 52'; Antwi (yellow card) 64'	Stadium: Holker Street; Attendance: 3,434; Referee: Elliot Bell

28 September 2024 8	Gillingham	2–0	Barrow	Gillingham
15:00 GMT	Clarke 17', (yellow card) 71'; Clark (yellow card) 19'; Hutton (yellow card) 55'; McKenzie 62'; Nevitt (yellow card) 69'; Williams (yellow card) 90+3'	Report	Jackson (yellow card) 61'; Popov (yellow card) 90+3'	Stadium: Priestfield Stadium; Attendance: 7,166; Referee: Neil Hair

1 October 2024 9	Doncaster Rovers	1–0	Barrow	Doncaster
19:45 GMT	Clifton 81'	Report	Campbell (yellow card) 46'; Acquah (yellow card) 90+1'	Stadium: Eco-Power Stadium; Attendance: 5,632; Referee: Farai Hallam

5 October 2024 10	Barrow	2–1	Cheltenham Town	Barrow-in-Furness
15:00 BST	Acquah 47'; Kouyaté (yellow card) 73'; Dallas 86'; Stanway (yellow card) 90+5'	Report	Bowman 41'; Willcox (yellow card) 66'	Stadium: Holker Street; Attendance: 3,518; Referee: Simon Mather

12 October 2024 11	Barrow	0–1	Morecambe	Barrow-in-Furness
15:00 BST	Jackson (yellow card) 45+3'	Report	White (yellow card) 37'; Tollitt (yellow card) 45+3', (goal) 82'; Lewis (yellow card) 62'; Hope (yellow card) 90'	Stadium: Holker Street; Attendance: 4,665; Referee: Ben Speedie

19 October 2024 12	Accrington Stanley	1–0	Barrow	Accrington
12:30 GMT	Whalley 8'; Coyle (yellow card) 30'; Woods (yellow card) 69'; Awe (yellow card) 81'; Henderson (yellow card) 90+3'	Report	Newby (yellow card) 90+4'	Stadium: Crown Ground; Attendance: 2,354; Referee: Charles Breakspear
Note: Fixture was initially scheduled for a 15:00 kick-off, but was moved for live Sky Sports broadcast.

22 October 2024 13	Barrow	1–1	Notts County	Barrow-in-Furness
19:45 BST	Feely 7'; Gotts (yellow card) 37'; Kouyaté (yellow card) 60'; Jackson (yellow card) 90+1'	Report	McDonald (yellow card) 24'; Gordon (yellow card) 32'; Crowley (yellow card) 43'; Tsaroulla (yellow card) 84'; McGoldrick 90+3' (pen.)	Stadium: Holker Street; Attendance: 3,123; Referee: Andrew Kitchen

26 October 2024 14	Bromley	1–1	Barrow	Bromley
15:00 BST	Thompson (yellow card) 47'; Grant (yellow card) 84'; Cheek 90+1' (pen.)	Report	Kouyaté (yellow card) 17'; Garner 21', (yellow card) 85'; Feely (yellow card) 85'; Stokes (yellow card) 86'	Stadium: Hayes Lane; Attendance: 3,406; Referee: Daniel Middleton

9 November 2024 15	Barrow	1–1	Colchester United	Barrow-in-Furness
15:00 GMT	Newby 31'; Spence (yellow card) 49'; Canavan (yellow card) 82'; Stanway (yellow card) 89'	Report	Payne (yellow card) 45+5'; Iandolo (yellow card) 61'; Tovide (yellow card) 88'; Taylor 90+2', (yellow card) 90+5'	Stadium: Holker Street; Attendance: 3,179; Referee: Ollie Yates

16 November 2024 16	Barrow	1–3	AFC Wimbledon	Barrow-in-Furness
15:00 GMT	Kirk (yellow card) 32'; Dallas 44'; Eccleston (yellow card) 52'	Report	Pigott 2', (yellow card) 27'; Ball (yellow card) 63'; Stevens 76', 77'; Goodman (yellow card) 79'; Lewis (yellow card) 90+3'	Stadium: Holker Street; Attendance: 3,227; Referee: Ross Joyce

23 November 2024 17	Chesterfield	1–0	Barrow	Chesterfield
15:00 GMT	Araujo (yellow card) 7'; Williams (yellow card) 27'; Grimes 89'	Report	Dallas (yellow card) 49'; Campbell (yellow card) 61'; Telford (yellow card) 90+4'	Stadium: SMH Group Stadium; Attendance: 7,701; Referee: Steven Copeland

3 December 2024 18	Bradford City	1–1	Barrow	Bradford
19:45 GMT	Sanderson (yellow card) 15'; Cook (yellow card) 17', (goal) 79'; Kavanagh (yellow card) 71'; Richards (yellow card) 82'		Stokes (yellow card) 15'; Gotts 57'; Kirk (yellow card) 58'	Stadium: Valley Parade; Attendance: 14,512; Referee: Tom Nield

14 December 2024 20	Walsall	1–0	Barrow	Bescot
15:00 GMT	Allen 28'; Matt (yellow card) 53'; Adomah (yellow card) 86'	Report	Tiensia (yellow card) 45'; Vassell (yellow card) 73'; Dallas (yellow card) 90+6'	Stadium: Bescot Stadium; Attendance: 5,109; Referee: Andrew Humphries

21 December 2024 21	Barrow	2–0	Fleetwood Town	Barrow-in-Furness
12:30 GMT	Acquah 4'; Vassell 10'; Spence (yellow card) 40'	Report	Bennett (yellow card) 82'	Stadium: Holker Street; Attendance: 3,007; Referee: Martin Coy
Note: Fixture was initially scheduled for a 15:00 kick-off, but was moved for live Sky Sports broadcast.

26 December 2024 22	Salford City	3–0	Barrow	Kersal
15:00 GMT	Stockton (yellow card) 9'; Garbutt 21'; Fornah 33', (yellow card) 37' (yellow-red card) 84'; Ashley (yellow card) 73'; Kouassi 80'	Report	Feely (yellow card) 37'; Popov (yellow card) 73'	Stadium: Moor Lane; Attendance: 2,983; Referee: Elliot Bell

29 December 2024 23	Tranmere Rovers	1–1	Barrow	Birkenhead
15:00 GMT	Patrick 35' (pen.); Finley (yellow card) 43'; Turnbull (yellow card) 48'; Solomon (yellow card) 53'	Report	Turnbull 11' (o.g.); Vassell (yellow card) 60'; Acquah (yellow card) 75'; Dallas (yellow card) 87'; Gotts (yellow card) 90+1'; Newby (yellow card) 90+7'	Stadium: Prenton Park; Attendance: 6,109; Referee: Aaron Bannister

1 January 2025 24	Barrow	2–2	Bradford City	Barrow-in-Furness
15:00 GMT	Gotts (yellow card) 12'; Dallas 45+2' (pen.); Acquah 78'		Richards 23'; Halliday (yellow card) 34'; Pattison (yellow card) 45+7'; Oduor 86'	Stadium: Holker Street; Attendance: 3,918; Referee: Thomas Kirk

4 January 2025 25	Barrow	0–2	Harrogate Town	Barrow-in-Furness
15:00 GMT	Eccleston (yellow card) 58'; Farman (yellow card) 61'; Mahoney (penalty missed) 75'; Vassell (yellow card) 83'; Spence (yellow card) 90+1'	Report	Morris (yellow card) 19'; Burrell (yellow card) 23'; Muldoon 56'; March 61'	Stadium: Holker Street; Attendance: 3,148; Referee: Stuart Morland

18 January 2025 27	Swindon Town	2–0	Barrow	Swindon
15:00 GMT	Ofoborh 8', (yellow card) 90+3'; Sobowale (yellow card) 77'; Smith 87'	Report		Stadium: County Ground; Attendance: 6,398; Referee: Scott Jackson

25 January 2025 28	Barrow	3–0	Grimsby Town	Barrow-in-Furness
15:00 GMT	Gotts 40'; Pressley (penalty missed) 53'; Smith 56'; Farman (yellow card) 82'; Vassell 85'	Report	Green (yellow card) 53'	Stadium: Holker Street; Attendance: 3,661; Referee: Oliver Mackey

29 January 2025 29	Barrow	1–3	Doncaster Rovers	Barrow-in-Furness
20:00 GMT	Acquah 45+5'; Smith (yellow card) 58'; Duru (yellow card) 60'; Campbell (yellow card) 90+4'	Report	Clifton (yellow card) 5'; Crew (yellow card) 9'; Olowu 28'; Molyneux 29', 78'	Stadium: Holker Street; Attendance: 3,009; Referee: Seb Stockbridge
Note: Fixture was initially scheduled for 28 January, but was moved for live Sky Sports broadcasting.

1 February 2025 30	Newport County	1–0	Barrow	Newport
15:00 GMT	Cameron 70' (o.g.)	Report	Duru (yellow card) 54'; Vassell (yellow card) 70'	Stadium: Rodney Parade; Attendance: 4,133; Referee: Scott Tallis

8 February 2025 31	Barrow	3–0	Gillingham	Barrow-in-Furness
15:00 GMT	Campbell (yellow card) 17'; Spence 60', 84'; Smith 90+5'	Report	Dack (yellow card) 28'	Stadium: Holker Street; Attendance: 3,130; Referee: Ross Joyce

11 February 2025 19	Barrow	2–1	Milton Keynes Dons	Barrow-in-Furness
19:45 GMT	Spence 10'; Foley (yellow card) 41'; Cameron 61'	Report	Hogan 8'; Lemonheigh-Evans (yellow card) 34'; Hendry (yellow card) 46'	Stadium: Holker Street; Attendance: 2,783; Referee: Simon Mather
Note: Fixture was originally scheduled for 7 December, but was postponed due to safety concerns from Storm Darragh.

15 February 2025 32	Cheltenham Town	3–2	Barrow	Cheltenham
15:00 GMT	Bennett (yellow card) 41'; Taylor 60', 70'; Hay 76'	Report	Foley 32'; Whitfield 46'; Farman (yellow card) 62'	Stadium: Whaddon Road; Attendance: 4,404; Referee: Greg Rollason

22 February 2025 33	Crewe Alexandra	3–0	Barrow	Crewe
12:30 GMT	O'Riordan 37'; Lowery 50' (pen.); Holíček 85'			Stadium: Gresty Road; Referee: David Rock
Note: Fixture was initially scheduled for a 15:00 kick-off, but was moved for live Sky Sports broadcasting.

27 February 2025 34	Barrow	0–1	Carlisle United	Barrow-in-Furness
20:00 GMT			Dennis 19'	Stadium: Holker Street; Attendance: 4,213; Referee: Adam Herczeg
Note: Fixture was initially scheduled for 1 March, but was moved for live Sky Sports broadcasting.

4 March 2025 35	Notts County	1–2	Barrow	Nottingham
19:45 GMT	Macari (yellow card) 18'; Whitaker (yellow card) 60'; Grant 64'; Tsaroulla (yellow card) 69'	Report	Spence 10'; Foley 62'	Stadium: Meadow Lane; Attendance: 7,872; Referee: Michael Barlow

8 March 2025 36	Barrow	2–0	Accrington Stanley	Barrow-in-Furness
15:00 GMT	Duru 14'; Gotts (yellow card) 34'; Pressley 78'	Report	Love (yellow card) 40'	Stadium: Holker Street; Attendance: 3,200; Referee: Declan Bourne

15 March 2025 37	Morecambe	2–2	Barrow	Morecambe
15:00 GMT	Edwards 9', (yellow card) 12'; Taylor (red card) 28'; Angol 45+3'; Lewis (yellow card) 60'	Report	Foley (yellow card) 54'; Gotts 63', (yellow card) 76'; Smith 73'; Campbell (yellow card) 90+2'	Stadium: Mazuma Mobile Stadium; Attendance: 4,351; Referee: Scott Simpson

22 March 2025 38	AFC Wimbledon	2–2	Barrow	Wimbledon
15:00 GMT	Browne 60'; Stevens 85'; Johnson (yellow card) 90+1'; Kelly (yellow card) 90+3'	Report	Campbell 88'; Mahoney 90+6'	Stadium: Plough Lane; Attendance: 8,657; Referee: Ruebyn Ricardo

25 March 2025 26	Port Vale	0–1	Barrow	Burslem
19:30 GMT		Report	Jackson 36'	Stadium: Vale Park; Attendance: 5,894; Referee: Zac Kennard-Kettle
Note: Fixture was originally scheduled for 11 January, but was postponed due to a frozen pitch.

29 March 2025 39	Barrow	0–1	Chesterfield	Barrow-in-Furness
15:00 GMT	Williams (yellow card) 51'; Campbell (yellow card) 84'; Kouyaté (yellow card) 88'	Report	Grimes (yellow card) 53'; Jacobs 78'	Stadium: Holker Street; Attendance: 3,392; Referee: Simon Mather

1 April 2025 40	Barrow	1–1	Salford City	Barrow-in-Furness
19:45 BST	Smith 37'	Report	Ashley (yellow card) 3'; Tilt (yellow card) 37'; Stanway 69' (o.g.); Warrington (yellow card) 86'	Stadium: Holker Street; Attendance: 2,818; Referee: Jacob Miles

5 April 2025 41	Milton Keynes Dons	0–3	Barrow	Denbigh
15:00 BST	Offord (yellow card) 59'; O'Reilly (yellow card) 77'; Leko (yellow card) 89'	Report	Pressley 16', 57'; Smith 90+3'	Stadium: Stadium MK; Attendance: 6,585; Referee: Jamie O'Connor

12 April 2025 42	Barrow	2–0	Walsall	Barrow-in-Furness
15:00 GMT	Jackson (yellow card) 11'; Pressley 23'; Canavan (yellow card) 83'; Acquah 90+3'	Report	Gordon (yellow card) 90'	Stadium: Holker Street; Attendance: 3,071; Referee: Stephen Martin

18 April 2025 43	Fleetwood Town	0–0	Barrow	Fleetwood
15:00 BST	Neal (yellow card) 14'; Potter (yellow card) 38'; Rooney (yellow card) 51'	Report	Acquah (yellow card) 51'; Whitfield (yellow card) 60'	Stadium: Highbury Stadium; Referee: Stephen Parkinson

21 April 2025 44	Barrow	0–0	Tranmere Rovers	Barrow-in-Furness
15:00 BST	Fletcher (yellow card) 69'	Report	O'Connor (yellow card) 34'; Hendry (yellow card) 60'; Wood (yellow card) 62'	Stadium: Holker Street; Attendance: 3,304; Referee: Thomas Kirk

26 April 2025 45	Barrow	3–3	Bromley	Barrow-in-Furness
15:00 BST	Whitfield 42' (pen.); Pressley (yellow card) 46'; Fletcher 53'; Williams (yellow card) 71'; Newby 85'; Vassell (yellow card) 90+4'	Report	Imray (yellow card) 19'; Charles (yellow card) 41'; Cheek 50'; Kabamba 75'; Sowunmi 90+1'; Elerewe (yellow card) 90+2'	Stadium: Holker Street; Attendance: 3,137; Referee: Oliver Mackey

3 May 2025 46	Colchester United	0–0	Barrow	Colchester
15:00 GMT		Report	Gotts (yellow card) 18'; Foley (yellow card) 35'; Cameron (red card) 76'; Williams (yellow card) 90+5'; Barnes (yellow card) 90+7'; Popov (yellow card) 90+7'	Stadium: Colchester Community Stadium; Attendance: 7,512; Referee: Ruebyn Ricardo

=== FA Cup ===
Barrow were drawn at home to Doncaster Rovers in the first round.

Win Draw Loss Fixtures

2 November 2024 First round	Barrow	0–1	Doncaster Rovers	Barrow-in-Furness
15:00 GMT	Garner (yellow card) 18'; Eccleston (yellow card) 39'; Newby (yellow card) 71'	Report	Kelly 83'	Stadium: Holker Street; Attendance: 2,605; Referee: Dale Baines

=== EFL Cup ===
On 27 June, the draw for the first round was made, with Barrow being drawn at home against Port Vale. In the second round, they were drawn at home to Derby County. In the third round, they were drawn away to Chelsea.

Win Draw Loss Fixtures

13 August 2024 First round	Barrow	3–2	Port Vale	Barrow-in-Furness
19:45 BST	Garner 1'; Campbell (yellow card) 41'; Jackson (yellow card) 49', (goal) 76'; Acquah 70'	Report	Paton 26'; Plant (yellow card) 48'; Sang 66'	Stadium: Holker Street; Attendance: 1,711; Referee: Scott Jackson

27 August 2024 Second round	Barrow	0–0 (3–2 p)	Derby County	Barrow-in-Furness
19:45 BST		Report	Chirewa (yellow card) 13'; Mendez-Laing (yellow card) 70'	Stadium: Holker Street; Attendance: 3,003; Referee: Seb Stockbridge
	Penalties
	Jackson (penalty scored); Gotts (penalty scored); Worrall (penalty scored); Spence (penalty missed)		(penalty missed) Collins; (penalty scored) Mendez-Laing; (penalty scored) Brown; (penalty missed) Jackson; (penalty missed) Forsyth

24 September 2024 Third round	Chelsea	5–0	Barrow	Fulham
19:45 BST	Nkunku 8', 15', 75'; Farman 28' (o.g.); Neto 48'; Felix (yellow card) 45'	Report	Foley (yellow card) 27'	Stadium: Stamford Bridge; Attendance: 38,868; Referee: Oliver Langford

=== EFL Trophy ===
In the group stage, Barrow were drawn into Northern Group D alongside Bolton Wanderers, Fleetwood Town and Aston Villa U21.

Pos	Div	Team	Pld	W	PW	PL	L	GF	GA	GD	Pts	Qualification
1	L1	Bolton Wanderers	3	2	0	1	0	6	4	+2	7	Advance to Round 2
2	ACA	Aston Villa U21	3	1	1	0	1	4	6	−2	5	Advance to Round 2
3	L2	Fleetwood Town	3	1	0	0	2	6	5	+1	3	
4	L2	Barrow	3	1	0	0	2	5	6	−1	3	

Source: EFL

Win Draw Loss Fixtures

3 September 2024 Group stage	Barrow	2–3	Bolton Wanderers	Barrow-in-Furness
19:45 BST	Foley 38'; Dallas 81'	Report	Schön (yellow card) 65'; McAtee 68'; Collins 73'; Dempsey (yellow card) 77', (goal) 79'	Stadium: Holker Street; Attendance: 2,005; Referee: Thomas Parsons

8 October 2024 Group stage	Fleetwood Town	3–0	Barrow	Fleetwood
19:00 BST	Broom (yellow card) 15'; Harratt 24', 35'; Smith 84'	Report	Dallas (yellow card) 59'; Eccleston (yellow card) 72'	Stadium: Highbury Stadium; Attendance: 734; Referee: James Westgate

29 October 2024 Group stage	Barrow	3–0	Aston Villa U21	Barrow-in-Furness
19:45 GMT	Telford 2'; Vassell 67'; Dallas 74'	Report	Pavey (yellow card) 47'	Stadium: Holker Street; Attendance: 539; Referee: Martin Woods

== Statistics ==
=== Appearances and goals ===
As of match played 21 April 2025

Players with no appearances are not included on the list
Italics indicate a loaned in player

No.	Pos	Nat	Player	Total		League Two		FA Cup		EFL Cup		EFL Trophy	
No.	Pos	Nat	Player	Apps	Goals	Apps	Goals	Apps	Goals	Apps	Goals	Apps	Goals
1	GK	(England) ENG	Paul Farman	33	0	29+0	0	0+0	0	3+0	0	1+0	0
3	DF	(Republic of Ireland) IRL	Mazeed Ogungbo	2	0	0+1	0	0+0	0	0+0	0	0+1	0
4	MF	(Scotland) SCO	Dean Campbell	39	1	28+5	1	1+0	0	3+0	0	2+0	0
5	DF	(Scotland) SCO	Kyle Cameron	15	1	15+0	1	0+0	0	0+0	0	0+0	0
6	DF	(Republic of Ireland) IRL	Niall Canavan	39	0	33+1	0	1+0	0	2+0	0	2+0	0
7	MF	(England) ENG	David Worrall	9	0	0+5	0	0+0	0	0+3	0	1+0	0
8	MF	(England) ENG	Kian Spence	37	5	29+3	5	0+0	0	2+1	0	0+2	0
9	FW	(England) ENG	Tyler Smith	19	5	10+9	5	0+0	0	0+0	0	0+0	0
10	FW	(England) ENG	Gerard Garner	22	4	12+4	3	1+0	0	3+0	1	1+1	0
11	MF	(England) ENG	Elliot Newby	47	2	34+8	2	0+1	0	2+1	0	0+1	0
14	MF	(Wales) WAL	MJ Williams	16	0	14+2	0	0+0	0	0+0	0	0+0	0
15	MF	(England) ENG	Robbie Gotts	43	3	37+2	3	1+0	0	1+1	0	1+0	0
16	MF	(Republic of Ireland) IRL	Sam Foley	37	4	24+8	3	1+0	0	2+0	0	2+0	1
17	FW	(England) ENG	Katia Kouyaté	26	0	8+11	0	1+0	0	2+1	0	3+0	0
18	DF	(England) ENG	Sam Barnes	3	0	0+3	0	0+0	0	0+0	0	0+0	0
19	FW	(England) ENG	Dom Telford	23	2	3+13	1	0+1	0	1+2	0	3+0	1
20	FW	(England) ENG	Emile Acquah	41	7	18+19	6	0+0	0	1+2	1	0+1	0
21	GK	(England) ENG	Wyll Stanway	18	0	15+0	0	1+0	0	0+0	0	2+0	0
22	MF	(Wales) WAL	Chris Popov	11	0	3+7	0	0+1	0	0+0	0	0+0	0
23	FW	(England) ENG	Connor Mahoney	30	1	16+11	1	1+0	0	1+0	0	1+0	0
25	FW	(England) ENG	Charlie Kirk	9	0	3+4	0	0+1	0	0+0	0	1+0	0
26	MF	(England) ENG	Isaac Fletcher	9	0	4+5	0	0+0	0	0+0	0	0+0	0
29	DF	(England) ENG	Junior Tiensia	12	0	3+5	0	0+0	0	0+1	0	3+0	0
30	DF	(England) ENG	Ben Jackson	48	2	41+2	1	1+0	0	3+0	1	1+0	0
33	FW	(Scotland) SCO	Aaron Pressley	20	4	13+7	4	0+0	0	0+0	0	0+0	0
34	MF	(England) ENG	Ben Whitfield	15	1	12+3	1	0+0	0	0+0	0	0+0	0
37	FW	(England) ENG	Sean Etaluku	1	0	0+0	0	0+0	0	0+0	0	0+1	0
39	DF	(United States) USA	Leo Duru	8	1	7+1	1	0+0	0	0+0	0	0+0	0
42	DF	(England) ENG	Theo Vassell	38	6	30+1	5	1+0	0	3+0	0	1+2	1
Player(s) who featured whilst on loan but returned to parent club during the season:
2	DF	(England) ENG	Neo Eccleston	24	1	7+10	1	1+0	0	1+2	0	1+2	0
9	FW	(Scotland) SCO	Andrew Dallas	22	5	6+12	3	0+0	0	0+1	0	2+1	2
Player(s) who featured but departed the club permanently during the season:
14	DF	(England) ENG	Chris Stokes	15	0	12+1	0	0+0	0	1+0	0	1+0	0
24	DF	(Republic of Ireland) IRL	Rory Feely	23	1	16+3	1	0+0	0	2+0	0	2+0	0
38	MF	(England) ENG	Charlie Weston	4	0	0+1	0	0+0	0	0+0	0	2+1	0
