= Neo Eccleston =

English footballer (born 2003)

Personal information
- Full name: Neo Arlee Ifny Eccleston
- Date of birth: 11 October 2003 (age 23)
- Place of birth: Hammersmith and Fulham, England
- Height: 5 ft 10 in (1.77 m)
- Position: Defender

Team information
- Current team: Hartlepool United
- Number: 12

Youth career
- Chelsea
- 2020–2024: Huddersfield Town

Senior career*
Years	Team	Apps	(Gls)
2024–2026	Huddersfield Town	3	(0)
2024–2025	→ Barrow (loan)	17	(1)
2025–2026	→ Grimsby Town (loan)	3	(0)
2026–	Hartlepool United	11	(0)
- * Club domestic league appearances and goals as of 23:15, 21 November 2026 (UTC)

Neo Arlee Ifny Eccleston (born 11 October 2003) is an English professional footballer who plays as a defender for National League club Hartlepool United.

== Career ==
Eccleston joined Huddersfield Town from the Chelsea Academy in 2020. He was named as an unused substitute on the final day of the 2023–24 season. He secured a contract until the summer of 2025.

Manager Michael Duff said "I've been pleased with how Neo has applied himself since we arrived at the club" after Eccleston impressed in pre-season. On 30 July 2024, he joined League Two club Barrow on a season-long loan. He made his senior debut on 10 August, after coming on as a stoppage-time substitute for Elliot Newby in a 1–0 win over Crewe Alexandra at Holker Street. On 15 January 2025, Barrow ended his loan and he returned to Huddersfield Town.

On 1 September 2025, Eccleston joined League Two side Grimsby Town on loan until the end of the season, however he returned to Huddersfield on 7 January 2026 after both parties agreed to terminate his loan.

On 8 May 2026, the club said the player would leave in the summer once his contract had expired.

=== Hartlepool United ===
On 2 July 2026, he signed for National League club Hartlepool United on a deal until June 2027, with an option to extend for a further year. He made his debut on the opening match of the 2026–27 season, coming on as a second-half substitute in a 2–0 home win against Barrow.

== Career statistics ==
As of matched played 21 November 2026

Appearances and goals by club, season and competition
Club	Season	League			FA Cup		EFL Cup		Other		Total	
Club	Season	Division	Apps	Goals	Apps	Goals	Apps	Goals	Apps	Goals	Apps	Goals
Huddersfield Town	2023–24	Championship	0	0	0	0	0	0	0	0	0	0
Huddersfield Town	2024–25	League One	3	0	0	0	0	0	0	0	3	0
Huddersfield Town	Total		3	0	0	0	0	0	0	0	3	0
Barrow (loan)	2024–25	League Two	17	1	1	0	3	0	3 (Note: Appearance(s) in EFL Trophy)	0	24	1
Grimsby Town (loan)	2025–26	League Two	2	0	0	0	1	0	2	0	5	0
Hartlepool United	2026–27	National League	11	0	1	0	–		3	0	15	0
Career total			33	1	2	0	4	0	8	0	47	1
