= Louis Flower =

English footballer (born 2004)

Personal information
- Full name: Louis Christopher Chukwuemeka Flower
- Date of birth: 6 October 2004 (age 22)
- Place of birth: Cambridge, England
- Position: Forward

Youth career
- –2018: Cambridge United
- 2018–2023: Chelsea
- 2023–2025: Brighton & Hove Albion

Senior career*
Years	Team	Apps	(Gls)
2025	Brighton & Hove Albion	0	(0)
2025	→ Gateshead (loan)	4	(0)
2025–2026	Crawley Town	12	(2)
2026	→ Woking (loan)	3	(1)
- * Club domestic league appearances and goals as of 16:26, 21 October 2026 (UTC)

Louis Christopher Chukwuemeka Flower (born 6 October 2004) is an English professional footballer who plays as a forward.

== Career ==
Having started with the Cambridge United academy, he joined Chelsea at under-13s level. On 1 September 2023, Flower joined the Brighton & Hove Albion academy. In January 2025, Flower joined National League club Gateshead on loan for the remainder of the season. Shortly after joining however, he suffered an injury in his fourth appearance, ending his time with the club.

On 4 July 2025, Flower joined League Two club Crawley Town on a one-year deal, following his release from the Brighton academy. On 9 February 2026, Flower joined National League side Woking on loan for the remainder of the campaign. He was released by Crawley Town upon the expiry of his contract at the end of the 2025–26 season.

== Career statistics ==
As of match played 28 February 2026

Appearances and goals by club, season and competition
Club	Season	League			FA Cup		EFL Cup		Other		Total	
Club	Season	Division	Apps	Goals	Apps	Goals	Apps	Goals	Apps	Goals	Apps	Goals
Chelsea U21	2021–22	—			—		—		1 (Note: Appearance(s) in EFL Trophy)	0	1	0
Chelsea U21	2022–23	—			—		—		1	0	1	0
Chelsea U21	Total				—		—		2	0	2	0
Brighton & Hove Albion U21	2023–24	—			—		—		5	0	5	0
Brighton & Hove Albion U21	2024–25	—			—		—		1	0	1	0
Brighton & Hove Albion U21	Total				—		—		6	0	6	0
Gateshead (loan)	2024–25	National League	4	0	0	0	—		0	0	4	0
Crawley Town	2025–26	League Two	12	2	1	0	1	0	2	1	16	3
Woking (loan)	2025–26	National League	3	1	—		—		1 (Note: Appearance in FA Trophy)	0	4	1
Career total			19	3	1	0	1	0	11	1	32	4
