= Ben Radcliffe (footballer) =

English footballer (born 2003)

- Radcliffe with Yeovil Town in 2026

Personal information
- Full name: William Benjamin Callister Radcliffe
- Date of birth: 15 September 2003 (age 23)
- Place of birth: Derby, England
- Positions: Central defender; midfielder

Team information
- Current team: Yeovil Town (on loan from Crawley Town)
- Number: 16

Youth career
- –2016: Derby County
- 2016–2021: Burton Albion

Senior career*
Years	Team	Apps	(Gls)
2021–2023	Burton Albion	1	(0)
2021–2022	→ Mickleover (loan)	19	(5)
2022–2023	→ Banbury United (loan)	43	(2)
2023–2025	Derby County	0	(0)
2024–2025	→ Gateshead (loan)	19	(2)
2025–	Crawley Town	20	(0)
2026	→ Gateshead (loan)	13	(1)
2026–	→ Yeovil Town (loan)	13	(1)
- * Club domestic league appearances and goals as of 22:43, 21 November 2026 (UTC)

William Benjamin Callister Radcliffe (born 15 September 2003) is a professional footballer who plays as a central defender and midfielder for National League club Yeovil Town on loan from EFL League Two club Crawley Town.

Radcliffe came through the youth setup at Burton Albion, where he had loan spells at Mickleover and Banbury United, before being released by Burton in June 2023, just two months after his league debut. In July 2023, Radcliffe signed with Derby County and had been a part of the under-21 squad. In 2024 & again in 2026, he was loaned to Gateshead from his respective clubs.

== Career ==
=== Burton Albion ===
Radcliffe joined the Burton Albion academy setup in 2016, after a period at Derby County's youth system. His first experience of senior first team football coming at Southern League Premier Division Central side Mickleover, initially on 28-day work experience loan in December 2021, his stay at Mickleover was extended until the end of 2021–22 season. He received high praise for his performances by Mickleover's manager John McGrath, he was used in a wide variety of positions at Mickleover in centre-back, right-back, right wing and attacking midfielder, Burton academy manager Danny Robinson, stating this was a great to his development as a player. At Mickleover, Radcliffe scored five goals during his six-month stay and his versatility, strength and intelligence as a player made him popular with teammates and coaches at Mickleover. At Burton, he won the club's Scholar of the season award.

In June 2022, Radcliffe signed his first professional contract with Burton. In August 2022 he joined National League North outfit Banbury United on a short team loan. This was later extended to the end of the Banbury's season, as he played 43 National League North games, scoring twice. Radcliffe made his Burton Albion and English Football League debut in Burton's 1–0 League One win at home to Cambridge United on 3 May 2023, a game which Radcliffe came on as an 18th-minute substitute, playing in the remainder of the match, he played the game at right-back and his performance in the match was described as "assured". Radcliffe was released by Burton in at the end of the 2022–23 season. His release was seen as a surprise by Burton reporters as he had just started to break into the first team.

=== Derby County ===
On 7 July 2023 Radcliffe joined Derby County as a part of their under-21 side. A day later, Radcliffe scored for Derby's first team, in a 2–0 pre-season friendly win at Matlock Town. During his first season at Derby, Radcliffe along with his role in the under-21s, did feature in several first team matchday squads, with his first team debut coming on 19 September 2023 in a EFL Trophy tie against Lincoln City as 79th-minute substitute, he played in defence and won several defensive headers. This would be his only first team appearance during the season as an injury from October 2023 to March 2024 would restrict his appearances to 7 Premier League 2 games for the under-21s during the season. He would as feature in the first team matchday squad as unused substitute at Northampton Town on 23 March 2024.

On 7 September 2024, Radcliffe joined National League club Gateshead on loan until January 2025.

=== Crawley Town ===
On 3 January 2025, Radcliffe signed for League One side Crawley Town on a two-year deal for an undisclosed fee, reuniting with former Gateshead manager Rob Elliot.

On 3 February 2026, he returned to Gateshead on loan until the end of the season. He was recalled by Crawley on 30 March after suffering an injury with Gateshead.

On 1 August 2026, Radcliffe joined National League club Yeovil Town on loan until January 2027.

== Personal life ==
Radcliffe earned a BTEC Extended Diploma and an A-level qualification in business studies during his scholarship at Burton. In 2021 whilst in Burton Albion's academy, Radcliffe won a BBC News Young Reporter of the Year Competition award at the aged 16–18 Me and My World category for documenting his experience as an apprentice footballer at a professional club, with a focus on mental health.

== Career statistics ==
As of match played 21 November 2026

Appearances and goals by club, season and competition
Club	Season	League			FA Cup		League Cup		Other		Total	
Club	Season	Division	Apps	Goals	Apps	Goals	Apps	Goals	Apps	Goals	Apps	Goals
Burton Albion	2021–22	League One	0	0	0	0	0	0	0	0	0	0
Burton Albion	2022–23	League One	1	0	0	0	0	0	0	0	1	0
Burton Albion	Total		1	0	0	0	0	0	0	0	1	0
Mickleover (loan)	2021–22	Northern Premier League Premier Division	19	5	0	0	—		0	0	19	5
Banbury United (loan)	2022–23	National League North	43	2	0	0	—		2 (Note: Appearances in FA Trophy)	0	45	2
Derby County	2023–24	League One	0	0	0	0	0	0	1 (Note: Appearances in EFL Trophy)	0	1	0
Derby County	2024–25	Championship	0	0	0	0	0	0	—		0	0
Derby County	Total		0	0	0	0	0	0	1	0	1	0
Gateshead (loan)	2024–25	National League	19	2	1	0	—		4	0	24	2
Crawley Town	2024–25	League One	19	0	0	0	0	0	0	0	19	0
Crawley Town	2025–26	League Two	1	0	0	0	0	0	3	2	4	2
Crawley Town	2026–27	League Two	0	0	0	0	0	0	0	0	0	0
Crawley Town	Total		20	0	0	0	0	0	3	2	23	2
Gateshead (loan)	2025–26	National League	13	1	0	0	—		0	0	13	1
Yeovil Town (loan)	2026–27	National League	13	1	2	0	—		1 (Note: Appearance in Somerset Premier Cup)	0	16	1
Career total			128	11	3	0	0	0	11	2	142	13
