= Jay Williams (footballer) =

English footballer (born 2000)

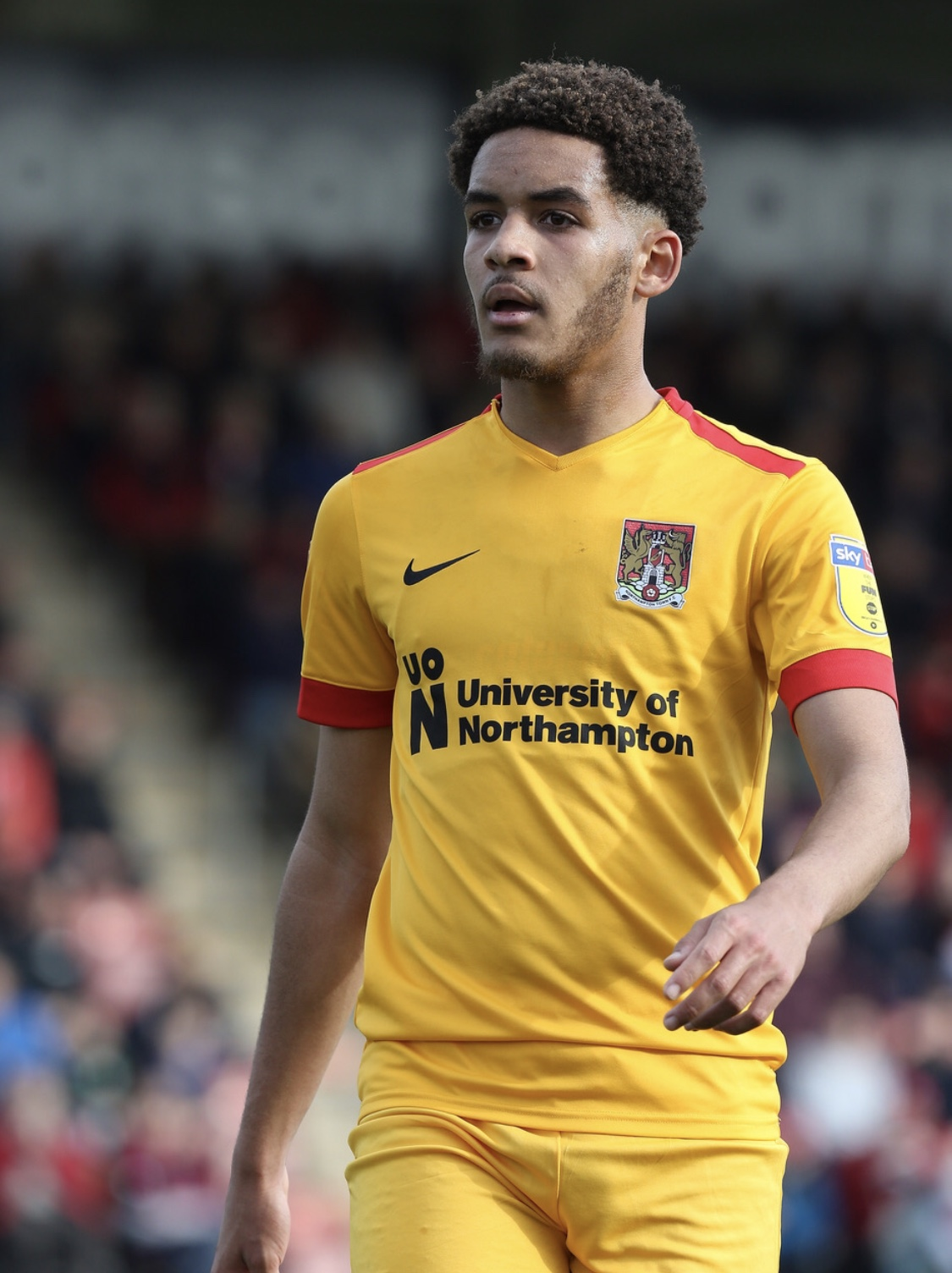
- Williams in March 2019

Personal information
- Full name: Jay Williams
- Date of birth: 4 October 2000 (age 26)
- Place of birth: Northampton, England, UK
- Height: 6 ft 2 in (1.88 m)
- Positions: Centre-back; defensive midfielder

Team information
- Current team: Colchester United
- Number: 26

Youth career
- 2013–2018: Northampton Town

Senior career*
| Years | Team | Apps | (Gls) |
| 2018–2020 | Northampton Town | 10 | (0) |
| 2020 | Kettering Town | 12 | (0) |
| 2021 | Harrogate Town | 7 | (1) |
| 2021 | AFC Rushden & Diamonds | 7 | (0) |
| 2021–2023 | Banbury United | 63 | (8) |
| 2023 | Brackley Town | 0 | (0) |
| 2023–2025 | Crawley Town | 52 | (1) |
| 2025 | Milton Keynes Dons | 10 | (0) |
| 2025–2026 | Crawley Town | 36 | (4) |
| 2026– | Colchester United | 4 | (0) |
- * Club domestic league appearances and goals as of 08:48, 8 October 2026 (UTC)

Jay Williams (born 4 October 2000) is an English professional footballer who plays as a centre-back and defensive midfielder for EFL League Two club Colchester United.

== Club career ==
=== Northampton Town ===
Williams joined Northampton Town at the age of 13. He made his first-team debut in their EFL Trophy tie against Wycombe Wanderers, featuring for the entire 90 minutes.

He made his league debut in a 5–0 away win to Macclesfield Town coming off of the bench to replace Sam Foley in the 73rd minute. He went on to play a vital part in the rest of that season racking up 14 appearances in total.

=== Kettering Town ===
In November 2020, Williams signed for National League North club Kettering Town.

=== Harrogate Town ===
On 7 January 2021, Williams signed for League Two side Harrogate Town.

=== Rushden & Diamonds ===
Following on from his release from Harrogate, he dropped down three divisions to sign for Southern Football League Premier Division Central side AFC Rushden & Diamonds.

=== Banbury United ===
He made the switch to divisional rivals Banbury United in October 2021 and extended his stay in December when he signed a contract until the end of the season. He was part of the team that were crowned champions in the 2021–22 season.

=== Crawley Town ===
In June 2023, Williams signed for National League North rivals Brackley Town. On 18 July 2023 however, he signed for League Two club Crawley Town on a two-year deal for an undisclosed fee.

On 27 August 2024, Williams injured Brighton midfielder Matt O'Riley with a tackle described in the media as "awful" and a "horror tackle". The Crawley manager Scott Lindsey apologised for Williams's challenge in the post-match press conference.

=== Milton Keynes ===
On 9 January 2025, Williams signed for League Two club Milton Keynes Dons for an undisclosed fee, the move reuniting him with former Crawley Town manager Scott Lindsey, in addition to former teammates Liam Kelly and Laurence Maguire.

=== Return to Crawley ===
On 27 June 2025, Williams returned to Crawley Town following their relegation back to League Two, making the move back to the club to once again reunite with Scott Lindsey.

=== Colchester United ===
On transfer deadline day Williams moved to fellow fourth tier side Colchester United for an undisclosed fee. He made his debut on 5 September, starting in a 3–1 loss to Swindon Town.

== International career ==
Born in England, Williams is of Kittitian descent. In March 2024, he was called up to the Saint Kitts and Nevis national team for a set of friendlies.

== Career statistics ==
As of 8 October 2026

Appearances and goals by club, season and competition
| Club | Season | League | | | FA Cup | | League Cup | | Other | | Total | |
| Club | Season | Division | Apps | Goals | Apps | Goals | Apps | Goals | Apps | Goals | Apps | Goals |
|---|---|---|---|---|---|---|---|---|---|---|---|---|
| Northampton Town | 2018–19 | League Two (4) | 10 | 0 | 0 | 0 | 0 | 0 | 4 (Note: Appearances in EFL Trophy) | 0 | 14 | 0 |
| Northampton Town | 2019–20 | League Two (4) | 0 | 0 | 0 | 0 | 1 | 0 | 2 | 0 | 3 | 0 |
| Northampton Town | Total | | 10 | 0 | 0 | 0 | 1 | 0 | 6 | 0 | 17 | 0 |
| Kettering Town | 2020–21 | National League North (6) | 12 | 0 | 0 | 0 | 0 | 0 | 0 | 0 | 12 | 0 |
| Harrogate Town | 2020–21 | League Two (4) | 7 | 1 | 0 | 0 | 0 | 0 | 0 | 0 | 7 | 1 |
| Rushden & Diamonds | 2021–22 | Southern Premier Division Central (7) | 7 | 0 | 0 | 0 | 0 | 0 | 0 | 0 | 7 | 0 |
| Banbury United | 2021–22 | Southern Premier Division Central (7) | 28 | 5 | 0 | 0 | 0 | 0 | 0 | 0 | 28 | 5 |
| Banbury United | 2022–23 | National League North (6) | 35 | 3 | 0 | 0 | 0 | 0 | 2 (Note: Appearances in FA Trophy) | 1 | 37 | 4 |
| Banbury United | Total | | 63 | 8 | 0 | 0 | 0 | 0 | 2 | 1 | 65 | 9 |
| Crawley Town | 2023–24 | League Two (4) | 40 | 1 | 0 | 0 | 0 | 0 | 5 | 2 | 44 | 3 |
| Crawley Town | 2024–25 | League One (3) | 12 | 0 | 0 | 0 | 1 | 0 | 0 | 0 | 13 | 0 |
| Crawley Town | Total | | 52 | 1 | 0 | 0 | 1 | 0 | 5 | 2 | 57 | 3 |
| Milton Keynes Dons | 2024–25 | League Two (4) | 10 | 0 | 0 | 0 | 0 | 0 | 0 | 0 | 10 | 0 |
| Crawley Town | 2025–26 | League Two (4) | 36 | 4 | 0 | 0 | 2 | 0 | 0 | 0 | 38 | 4 |
| Crawley Town | 2026–27 | League Two (4) | 0 | 0 | 0 | 0 | 1 | 0 | 0 | 0 | 1 | 0 |
| Crawley Town | Total | | 88 | 5 | 0 | 0 | 4 | 0 | 5 | 2 | 95 | 7 |
| Colchester United | 2026–27 | League Two (4) | 4 | 0 | 0 | 0 | 0 | 0 | 0 | 0 | 4 | 0 |
| Career total | | | 201 | 14 | 0 | 0 | 6 | 0 | 13 | 3 | 217 | 17 |

== Honours ==
Harrogate Town

- FA Trophy: 2019–20

Crawley Town

- EFL League Two play-offs: 2024
