= 2025–26 Crawley Town F.C. season =

130th season in existence of Crawley Town FC

Crawley Town
2025–26 season
- Owner: WAGMI United until 31 July 2025; KB Sports and Leisure Ltd from 1 August 2025
- Chairman: Daniel Khalili, Ryan Gilbert & Maxwell Strowman
- Manager: Scott Lindsey (until 22 March); Colin Kazim-Richards (from 24 March)
- Stadium: Broadfield Stadium
- League Two: 22nd
- FA Cup: First round
- EFL Cup: First round
- EFL Trophy: Group stage

The 2025–26 season is the 130th season in the history of Crawley Town Football Club and their first season back in League Two since the 2023–24 season, following relegation from League One in the preceding season. In addition to the domestic league, the club would also participate in the FA Cup, the EFL Cup, and the EFL Trophy.

== Managerial changes ==
On 22 March, Scott Lindsey was sacked as manager after a year in charge and a 22.6% win rate. Two days later, Colin Kazim-Richards was appointed as head coach until the end of the season.

== Transfers and contracts ==
=== In ===
Date	Pos.	Player	From	Fee	Ref.
23 June 2025 (Note: The transfer was announced on 29 May, and would become official on 23 June)	CM	Reece Brown (ENG)	Free agent	—N/a	
27 June 2025	DM	Jay Williams (SKN)	Milton Keynes Dons (ENG)	Undisclosed	
1 July 2025 (Note: The transfer was announced on 19 June, and would become official on 1 July, following the expiry of his Worthing contract.)	CF	Danny Cashman (ENG)	Worthing (ENG)	Free	
1 July 2025 (Note: The transfer was announced on 2 June, and would become official on 1 July, following the expiry of his Bromley contract.)	RW	Harry McKirdy (ENG)	Bromley (ENG)	Free	
1 July 2025	CF	Kabongo Tshimanga (ENG)	Peterborough United (ENG)	Free	
4 July 2025	CF	Louis Flower (ENG)	Brighton & Hove Albion (ENG)	Free	
4 July 2025	LW	Dion Pereira (ATG)	Luton Town (ENG)	Free	
17 July 2025	CM	Kyle Scott (USA)	Orange County (USA)	Undisclosed	
2 August 2025	RW	Fate Kotey (ENG)	Sutton Common Rovers (ENG)	Free	
28 August 2025	CM	Jude Robertson (ENG)	Aveley (ENG)	Free	
1 January 2026	CM	Taylor Richards (ENG)	Queens Park Raangers (ENG)	Free	
1 January 2026	CB	Theo Vassell (ENG)	Barrow (ENG)	Free	
3 January 2026	CB	Akin Odimayo (ENG)	Newport County (WAL)	Free	
3 January 2026	LB	Jonny Russell (NIR)	Glentoran (NIR)	Undisclosed	
11 January 2026	CF	Danilo Orsi (ENG)	AFC Wimbledon (ENG)	Undisclosed	
16 January 2026	RWB	Kellan Gordon (ENG)	Notts County (ENG)	Undisclosed	
16 January 2026	LB	Lewis Richards (IRL)	Bradford City (ENG)	Undisclosed	
26 January 2026	CM	Justin Ferizaj (IRL)	Bray Wanderers (IRL)	Free	

=== Out ===
Date	Pos.	Player	To	Fee	Ref.
11 June 2025	CF	Rushian Hepburn-Murphy (ENG)	Milton Keynes Dons (ENG)	Undisclosed	
11 June 2025	CB	Toby Mullarkey (ENG)	Fleetwood Town (ENG)	Undisclosed	
20 June 2025	CM	Panutche Camará (GNB)	Dundee United (SCO)	Undisclosed	
20 June 2025	CAM	Junior Quitirna (GNB)	Wycombe Wanderers (ENG)	Undisclosed	
23 June 2025	RB	Rory Feely (IRL)	Cork City (IRL)	Undisclosed	
28 June 2025	CF	Will Swan (ENG)	Bradford City (ENG)	Undisclosed	
4 July 2025	CB	Benjamin Tanimu (NGA)	MAS Fès (MAR)	Undisclosed	
8 January 2026	CM	Kyle Scott (USA)	Las Vegas Lights (USA)	Undisclosed	
12 January 2026	CB	Joy Mukena (ENG)	Yeovil Town (ENG)	Free Transfer	
22 January 2026	CF	Kabongo Tshimanga (ENG)	Barnet (ENG)	Undisclosed	
23 January 2026	CF	Tola Showunmi (ENG)	Louisville City (USA)	Undisclosed	
27 January 2026	CAM	Gavan Holohan (IRL)	Hartlepool United (ENG)	Free Transfer	

=== Loaned in ===
Date	Pos.	Player	From	Date until	Ref.
26 June 2025	GK	Harvey Davies (ENG)	Liverpool (ENG)	2 February 2026 (Note: On 2 February, Davies' was recalled back to Liverpool from his initial season-long loan)	
15 August 2025	RW	Kaheim Dixon (JAM)	Charlton Athletic (ENG)	2 February 2026 (Note: On 2 February, Dixon was recalled back to Charlton Athletic from his initial season-long loan)	
22 August 2025	CB	Geraldo Bajrami (ALB)	Burton Albion (ENG)	31 May 2026	
1 September 2025	CF	Ryan Loft (ENG)	Cambridge United (ENG)	31 May 2026	
2 January 2026	CF	Tobi Adeyemo (ENG)	Watford (ENG)	31 May 2026	
9 January 2026	CM	Louie Copley (ENG)	Arsenal (ENG)	31 May 2026	
9 January 2026	CF	Klaidi Lolos (GRE)	Peterborough United (ENG)	31 May 2026	
21 January 2026	CAM	Ronan Darcy (ENG)	Wigan Athletic (ENG)	31 May 2026	
23 January 2026	GK	Jacob Chapman (AUS)	Huddersfield Town (ENG)	31 May 2026	

=== Loaned out ===
Date	Pos.	Player	To	Date until	Ref.
8 August 2025	GK	Ryan Sandford (ENG)	Eastbourne Borough (ENG)	31 December 2025	
19 September 2025	CM	Antony Papadopoulos (ENG)	Maidstone United (ENG)	1 February 2026	
21 November 2025	GK	Will Heater (ENG)	Sheppey United (ENG)	20 December 2025	
15 January 2025	RW	Fate Kotey (ENG)	Whitehawk (ENG)	31 May 2026	
15 January 2025	CM	Jude Robertson (ENG)	Whitehawk (ENG)	31 May 2026	
3 February 2026	CB	Ben Radcliffe (ENG)	Gateshead (ENG)	30 March 2026 (Note: On 30 March, Radcliffe was recalled back from his half-season loan at Gateshead)	
9 February 2026	CF	Louis Flower (ENG)	Woking (ENG)	31 May 2026	
23 March 2026	CM	Antony Papadopoulos (ENG)	Chelmsford City (ENG)	31 May 2026	
26 March 2026	CF	Danny Cashman (ENG)	Sutton United (ENG)	31 May 2026	

=== Released / Out of Contract ===
Date	Pos.	Player	Subsequent club	Join date	Ref.
30 June 2025	CF	Sonny Fish (WAL)	Torquay United (ENG)	1 July 2025	
30 June 2025	LM	Jeremy Kelly (USA)	Charleston Battery (USA)	1 July 2025	
30 June 2025	GK	Jasper Sheik (ENG)	South Shields (ENG)	1 July 2025	
30 June 2025	CDM	Liam Fraser (CAN)	Reading (ENG)	23 July 2025	
30 June 2025	CF	Tyreece John-Jules (ENG)	Kilmarnock (SCO)	24 October 2025	
6 January 2026	GK	Ryan Sandford (ENG)			
2 February 2026	CM	Jack Roles (CYP)			

=== New Contract ===
Date	Pos.	Player	End date	Ref.
23 June 2025	LM	Harry Forster (ENG)	30 June 2026	
24 June 2025	CB	Joy Mukena (ENG)	30 June 2026	
24 June 2025	GK	Ryan Sandford (ENG)	31 December 2025	
27 June 2025	CB	Dion Conroy (ENG)	30 June 2027	
5 August 2025	GK	Will Heater (ENG)	Undisclosed (Note: First professional contract)	

== Pre-season and friendlies ==
On 30 May, Crawley Town announced a seven-day warm-weather training camp in Murcia, where they would take on Scottish Premiership side Heart of Midlothian. Further friendlies against Three Bridges, East Grinstead Town, Dagenham & Redbridge, Portsmouth and Southampton XI were also confirmed. A seventh friendly was later added, against Crystal Palace.

Win	Draw	Loss

Pre-season match details
Date	Time	Opponent	Venue	Result F–A	Scorers	Attendance	Ref.
4 July 2025	18:00	Heart of Midlothian	Neutral	1–3	Flower 21'		
8 July 2025	19:45	Three Bridges	Away	5–0	Pereira 11', Tshimanga 37', Brown 44', Flower 85', Roles 89'		
12 July 2025	15:00	East Grinstead Town	Away	5–1	Pereira 52', 90', Flower 65', Adeyemo 84', Radcliffe 90+2'		
15 July 2025	19:30	Dagenham & Redbridge	Away	5–1	McKirdy 20', Forster 33', Brown 68', Trialist 85', 87'		
19 July 2025 (Note: Fixture was initially postponed at the Broadfield Stadium due to heavy rainfall, however the game went ahead behind closed doors.)	15:00	Portsmouth	Home	0–1		0	
22 July 2025	13:30	Southampton XI	Away	1–2	Roles 9'	0	
25 July 2025	19:30	Crystal Palace	Home	0–3			

== Competitions ==
=== League Two ===
==== League table ====
Pos	Team	Pld	W	D	L	GF	GA	GD	Pts	Promotion, qualification or relegation
20	Newport County	46	12	7	27	48	77	−29	43	
21	Tranmere Rovers	46	10	11	25	54	79	−25	41	
22	Crawley Town	46	8	16	22	44	68	−24	40	
23	Harrogate Town (R)	46	10	9	27	39	68	−29	39	Relegation to National League
24	Barrow (R)	46	9	9	28	45	78	−33	36	Relegation to National League

Source: EFL Official Website
Rules for classification: 1) Points; 2) Goal difference; 3) Number of goals scored; 4) Head-to-head results; 5) Wins; 6) Away goals; 7) Penalty points (sec 9.5); 8) 12-point sending off offences
(R) Relegated

==== Results summary ====
Overall								Home						Away					
Pld	W	D	L	GF	GA	GD	Pts	W	D	L	GF	GA	GD	W	D	L	GF	GA	GD
45	8	15	22	44	68	−24	39	5	9	8	26	28	−2	3	6	14	18	40	−22

Last updated: 25 April 2026.
Source: Soccerway

==== Matches ====
Win	Draw	Loss

League Two match details
Date	Time	Opponent	Venue	Result F–A	Scorers	Attendance	League position	Ref.
2 August 2025	15:00	Grimsby Town	Away	0–3		6,806	24th	
9 August 2025	15:00	Newport County	Home	1–2	Anderson 90+6'	3,189	23rd	
16 August 2025	15:00	Crewe Alexandra	Away	0–1		5,062	23rd	
19 August 2025	19:45	Milton Keynes Dons	Home	1–1	Adeyemo 45+7'	5,361	22nd	
23 August 2025	15:00	Tranmere Rovers	Home	0–2		3,151	22nd	
30 August 2025	15:00	Chesterfield	Away	2–2	McKirdy 9', 36' pen.	8,005	21st	
6 September 2025	15:00	Harrogate Town	Away	1–0	Brown 42'	2,757	20th	
13 September 2025	12:30	Cheltenham Town	Home	2–0	McKirdy 68', 84' pen.	3,127	18th	
20 September 2025	15:00	Notts County	Away	0–4		8,974	21st	
27 September 2025	15:00	Barrow	Home	1–2	Bajrami 65'	2,889	21st	
4 October 2025	15:00	Cambridge United	Away	1–3	Tshimanga 66'	6,607	21st	
11 October 2025	15:00	Walsall	Home	1–1	Loft 32'	3,461	21st	
18 October 2025	15:00	Shrewsbury Town	Away	0–1		4,743	23rd	
25 October 2025	15:00	Bristol Rovers	Home	4–0	Kilgour 45+9' o.g., Forster 52', Malone 69', Flower 86'	3,416	23rd	
8 November 2025	15:00	Fleetwood Town	Home	2–1	Flower 38', Forster 65'	2,879	19th	
15 November 2025 (Note: Fixture was originally scheduled for a 15:00 kick-off, but was rescheduled for live Sky Sports broadcasting.)	17:30	Gillingham	Away	2–2	Bajrami 52', Tshimanga 82'	6,252	20th	
22 November 2025	15:00	Accrington Stanley	Home	1–1	Tshimanga 65'	2,885	19th	
29 November 2025	15:00	Salford City	Away	3–4	Williams 33', 72', Forster 57'	2,127	19th	
9 December 2025	19:45	Bromley	Away	1–3	Loft 9'	3,544	21st	
13 December 2025	15:00	Oldham Athletic	Home	2–2	Loft 18', Tshimanga 82'	3,152	21st	
20 December 2025	15:00	Swindon Town	Away	0–1		8,172	21st	
26 December 2025	15:00	Colchester United	Home	1–1	Brown 13'	3,993	20th	
29 December 2025	19:45	Bromley	Home	1–3	Barker 43'	4,058	20th	
1 January 2026	15:00	Barnet	Away	1–2	McKirdy 33'	2,566	21st	
4 January 2026 (Note: Fixture was originally scheduled for a 15:00 kick-off, but was rescheduled for live Sky Sports broadcasting.)	12:00	Cheltenham Town	Away	0–3		3,211	21st	
17 January 2026	15:00	Notts County	Home	1–2	McKirdy 90+4'	3,933	22nd	
24 January 2026	15:00	Barrow	Away	1–0	Richards 89'	2,322	20th	
27 January 2026	19:45	Walsall	Away	0–0		4,899	20th	
31 January 2026	15:00	Harrogate Town	Home	2–0	Anderson 27', Flint 66'	3,326	19th	
7 February 2026 (Note: Fixture was initially scheduled for a 15:00 kick-off, but was rescheduled for live Sky Sports broadcasting.)	12:30	Crewe Alexandra	Home	0–1		2,975	20th	
10 February 2026 (Note: Fixture was originally scheduled for 10 January, but was postponed due to Cambridge's FA Cup involvements.)	19:45	Cambridge United	Home	0–3		2,961	20th	
14 February 2026	15:00	Tranmere Rovers	Away	0–2		5,739	22nd	
17 February 2026	19:45	Milton Keynes Dons	Away	0–0		7,035	21st	
21 February 2026	15:00	Chesterfield	Home	1–1	Williams 90+5'	3,250	21st	
28 February 2026	15:00	Oldham Athletic	Away	0–2		7,050	21st	
7 March 2026	15:00	Swindon Town	Home	2–2	Lolos 48', Gordon 90+8'	4,124	21st	
13 March 2026	19:45	Colchester United	Away	0–0		5,167	22nd	
17 March 2026	19:45	Barnet	Home	1–1	Orsi 89' pen.		21st	
21 March 2026	15:00	Fleetwood Town	Away	0–1		2,638	21st	
28 March 2026	15:00	Gillingham	Home	2–0	Richards 90+1', Adeyemo 90+3'	4,338	21st	
3 April 2026	15:00	Newport County	Away	2–0	McKirdy 57', 59'	6,146	21st	
6 April 2026	15:00	Grimsby Town	Home	0–2		4,273	21st	
11 April 2026 (Note: Fixture was initially scheduled for a 15:00 kick-off, but was brought forward for Sky Sports broadcasting.)	12:30	Bristol Rovers	Away	1–3	Watson 80'	7,453	21st	
18 April 2026	15:00	Shrewsbury Town	Home	0–0		3,602	21st	
25 April 2026	15:00	Accrington Stanley	Away	3–3	Forster 37', Richards 58', Williams 71'	2,240	22nd	
2 May 2026	15:00	Salford City	Home	0–0		5,191	22nd	

=== FA Cup ===
Crawley were drawn away to Boreham Wood in the first round.

Win	Draw	Loss

FA Cup match details
Round	Date	Time	Opponent	Venue	Result F–A	Scorers	Attendance	Ref.
First round	1 November 2025	15:00	Boreham Wood	0–3	Away		1,536	

=== EFL Cup ===
Win Draw Loss Fixtures

Win	Draw	Loss

EFL Cup match details
Round	Date	Time	Opponent	Venue	Result F–A	Scorers	Attendance	Ref.
First round	12 August 2025	19:00	Swansea City	Away	1–3	Tshimanga 75'	5,095	

=== EFL Trophy ===
Crawley were drawn against Leyton Orient, Peterborough United and Aston Villa U21 in the group stage.

Pos	Div	Team	Pld	W	PW	PL	L	GF	GA	GD	Pts	Qualification
1	L1	Leyton Orient	3	3	0	0	0	6	2	+4	9	Advance to Round 2
2	L1	Peterborough United	3	2	0	0	1	7	6	+1	6	Advance to Round 2
3	L2	Crawley Town	3	1	0	0	2	6	6	0	3	
4	ACA	Aston Villa U21	3	0	0	0	3	4	9	−5	0	

Source: EFL

EFL Trophy match details
Round	Date	Time	Opponent	Venue	Result F–A	Scorers	Attendance	Ref.
Group stage	16 September 2025	19:45	Aston Villa U21	Home	4–2	Dixon 19', Radcliffe 22', 64', Loft 58'		
Group stage	7 October 2025	19:00	Leyton Orient	Away	1–2	Flower 3'	1,373	
Group stage	11 November 2025	19:45	Peterborough United	Home	1–2	Bajrami 73'	924	

== Statistics ==
=== Appearances and goals ===
As of match played 11 April 2026

Players with no appearances are not included on the list, italics indicate a loaned in player

No.	Pos	Nat	Player	Total		League Two		FA Cup		EFL Cup		EFL Trophy	
No.	Pos	Nat	Player	Apps	Goals	Apps	Goals	Apps	Goals	Apps	Goals	Apps	Goals
2	DF	(England) ENG	Scott Malone	16	1	11+2	1	1+0	0	0+0	0	2+0	0
3	DF	(England) ENG	Dion Conroy	22	0	20+0	0	1+0	0	0+0	0	1+0	0
4	DF	(Albania) ALB	Geraldo Bajrami	30	3	23+5	2	1+0	0	0+0	0	1+0	1
5	DF	(England) ENG	Charlie Barker	44	1	38+2	1	1+0	0	1+0	0	0+2	0
6	MF	(Scotland) SCO	Max Anderson	22	2	9+9	2	1+0	0	1+0	0	2+0	0
7	MF	(England) ENG	Harry Forster	39	3	19+17	3	0+1	0	0+0	0	2+0	0
10	MF	(England) ENG	Reece Brown	24	2	16+4	2	0+1	0	1+0	0	2+0	0
12	DF	(Republic of Ireland) IRL	Lewis Richards	11	0	7+4	0	0+0	0	0+0	0	0+0	0
13	FW	(England) ENG	Harry McKirdy	32	8	24+7	8	0+0	0	1+0	0	0+0	0
14	FW	(England) ENG	Louis Flower	16	3	5+7	2	0+1	0	0+1	0	2+0	1
15	DF	(England) ENG	Ben Radcliffe	4	2	1+0	0	0+0	0	0+0	0	3+0	2
16	DF	(Northern Ireland) NIR	Jonny Russell	16	0	11+5	0	0+0	0	0+0	0	0+0	0
18	FW	(England) ENG	Danny Cashman	5	0	3+2	0	0+0	0	0+0	0	0+0	0
19	FW	(Antigua and Barbuda) ANT	Dion Pereira	31	0	16+14	0	0+1	0	0+0	0	0+0	0
20	MF	(Republic of Ireland) IRL	Justin Ferizaj	3	0	2+1	0	0+0	0	0+0	0	0+0	0
21	FW	(England) ENG	Ryan Loft	16	4	11+1	3	1+0	0	0+0	0	3+0	1
22	FW	(Denmark) DEN	Ade Adeyemo	30	1	21+7	1	0+0	0	1+0	0	0+1	0
23	FW	(England) ENG	Fate Kotey	5	0	0+1	0	0+0	0	0+1	0	3+0	0
25	MF	(England) ENG	Antony Papadopoulos	3	0	0+1	0	0+0	0	0+1	0	0+1	0
26	MF	(Saint Kitts and Nevis) SKN	Jay Williams	34	3	32+1	3	0+0	0	1+0	0	0+0	0
27	MF	(Republic of Ireland) IRL	Louie Watson	24	1	10+12	1	1+0	0	0+1	0	0+0	0
28	DF	(England) ENG	Josh Flint	37	1	33+0	1	1+0	0	1+0	0	1+1	0
30	MF	(England) ENG	Louie Copley	7	0	6+1	0	0+0	0	0+0	0	0+0	0
31	DF	(England) ENG	Akin Odimayo	11	0	4+7	0	0+0	0	0+0	0	0+0	0
32	MF	(England) ENG	Taylor Richards	16	2	11+5	2	0+0	0	0+0	0	0+0	0
34	GK	(Ghana) GHA	Jojo Wollacott	12	0	9+0	0	1+0	0	0+0	0	2+0	0
35	GK	(Australia) AUS	Jacob Chapman	17	0	17+0	0	0+0	0	0+0	0	0+0	0
38	FW	(England) ENG	Tobi Adeyemo	9	1	4+5	1	0+0	0	0+0	0	0+0	0
41	DF	(England) ENG	Kellan Gordon	14	1	13+1	1	0+0	0	0+0	0	0+0	0
42	DF	(England) ENG	Theo Vassell	7	0	7+0	0	0+0	0	0+0	0	0+0	0
44	FW	(Greece) GRE	Klaidi Lolos	12	1	11+1	1	0+0	0	0+0	0	0+0	0
49	MF	(England) ENG	Ronan Darcy	13	0	10+3	0	0+0	0	0+0	0	0+0	0
56	MF	(England) ENG	Jude Robertson	3	0	0+0	0	0+0	0	0+0	0	0+3	0
99	FW	(England) ENG	Danilo Orsi	15	1	15+0	1	0+0	0	0+0	0	0+0	0
Players who featured but departed the club during the season:
1	GK	(England) ENG	Harvey Davies	19	0	17+0	0	0+0	0	1+0	0	1+0	0
8	MF	(Republic of Ireland) IRL	Gavan Holohan	17	0	8+6	0	1+0	0	0+1	0	0+1	0
9	FW	(England) ENG	Kabongo Tshimanga	26	5	10+13	4	0+0	0	1+0	1	2+0	0
11	MF	(Cyprus) CYP	Jack Roles	18	0	3+13	0	0+0	0	1+0	0	1+0	0
17	MF	(United States) USA	Kyle Scott	12	0	9+0	0	1+0	0	0+0	0	2+0	0
20	DF	(England) ENG	Joy Mukena	4	0	1+0	0	0+0	0	1+0	0	2+0	0
24	FW	(Jamaica) JAM	Kaheim Dixon	16	1	7+7	0	0+1	0	0+0	0	1+0	1
29	FW	(England) ENG	Tola Showunmi	4	0	0+2	0	0+0	0	0+0	0	0+2	0

=== Goals record ===
As of match played 11 April 2026

Rank	No.	Nat.	Pos.	Name	League Two	FA Cup	EFL Cup	EFL Trophy	Total
1	13	(England)	FW	Harry McKirdy	8	0	0	0	8
2	9	(England)	FW	Kabongo Tshimanga	4	0	1	0	5
3	21	(England)	FW	Ryan Loft	3	0	0	1	4
4	4	(Albania)	DF	Geraldo Bajrami	2	0	0	1	3
4	7	(England)	MF	Harry Forster	3	0	0	0	3
4	14	(England)	FW	Louis Flower	2	0	0	1	3
4	26	(Saint Kitts and Nevis)	MF	Jay Williams	3	0	0	0	3
8	6	(Scotland)	MF	Max Anderson	2	0	0	0	2
8	10	(England)	MF	Reece Brown	2	0	0	0	2
8	15	(England)	DF	Ben Radcliffe	0	0	0	2	2
8	32	(England)	MF	Taylor Richards	2	0	0	0	2
12	2	(England)	DF	Scott Malone	1	0	0	0	1
12	5	(England)	DF	Charlie Barker	1	0	0	0	1
12	22	(Denmark)	FW	Ade Adeyemo	1	0	0	0	1
12	24	(Jamaica)	FW	Kaheim Dixon	0	0	0	1	1
12	27	(Republic of Ireland)	MF	Louie Watson	1	0	0	0	1
12	28	(England)	DF	Josh Flint	1	0	0	0	1
12	38	(England)	FW	Tobi Adeyemo	1	0	0	0	1
12	41	(England)	DF	Kellan Gordon	1	0	0	0	1
12	44	(Greece)	FW	Klaidi Lolos	1	0	0	0	1
12	99	(England)	FW	Danilo Orsi	1	0	0	0	1
12	Own goals				1	0	0	0	1
Total					41	0	1	5	47
