= 2018–19 Northampton Town F.C. season =

Northampton Town
2018–19 season
- Chairman: Kelvin Thomas
- Manager: Dean Austin (until 30 September); Keith Curle (from 1 October)
- Stadium: Sixfields Stadium
- League Two: 15th
- FA Cup: First round
- EFL Cup: First round
- EFL Trophy: Third round
- Top goalscorer: League: Andy Williams (12); All: Andy Williams (12)
- Highest home attendance: 6,963 vs MK Dons
- Lowest home attendance: 1,053 vs Wycombe Wanderers
- Average home league attendance: 4,958
Home colours	Away colours

The 2018–19 season was Northampton Town's 122nd season in their history and the first season back in League Two after relegation the previous year. Alongside competing in League Two, the club also participated in the FA Cup, EFL Cup and EFL Trophy.

== Players ==
As of match played 4 May 2019.

No.	Name	Position	Nat.	Place of birth	Date of birth (age)	Apps	Goals	Previous club	Date signed	Fee
Goalkeepers
1	David Cornell	GK	(Wales)	Waunarlwydd	28 March 1991 (aged 28)	70	0	Oldham Athletic	21 June 2016	Free
13	James Goff	GK	(England)	Northampton	28 March 1999 (aged 20)	0	0	Academy	30 April 2017	N/A
30	Luke Coddington	GK	(England)	Middlesbrough	6 June 1995 (aged 23)	2	0	Huddersfield Town	17 August 2017	Free
Defenders
2	Shay Facey	RB	(England)	Stockport	7 January 1995 (aged 24)	42	1	Manchester City	5 January 2018	Undisclosed
3	David Buchanan	LB	(Northern Ireland)	Rochdale (ENG)	6 May 1986 (aged 32)	187	1	Preston North End	28 May 2015	Free
4	Charlie Goode	CB	(England)	Watford	3 August 1995 (aged 23)	17	0	Scunthorpe United	31 January 2019	Loan
6	Ash Taylor (c)	CB	(Wales)	Bromborough (ENG)	2 September 1990 (aged 28)	88	7	Aberdeen	5 July 2017	Free
12	George Cox	LB	(England)	Brighton	14 January 1998 (aged 21)	5	0	Brighton & Hove Albion	7 January 2019	Loan
16	Aaron Pierre	CB	(Grenada)	Southall (ENG)	17 February 1993 (aged 26)	68	8	Wycombe Wanderers	21 July 2017	Free
18	Jordan Turnbull	CB	(England)	Trowbridge	30 October 1994 (aged 24)	52	0	Coventry City	11 January 2018	Add-ons
29	Ryan Hughes	CB	(England)	Mawsley	24 April 2001 (aged 18)	1	0	Academy	N/A	N/A
31	Jay Williams	CB	(England)	Northampton	4 October 2000 (aged 18)	14	0	Academy	8 January 2019	N/A
Midfielders
7	Sam Hoskins	AM	(England)	Dorchester	4 February 1993 (aged 26)	148	20	Yeovil Town	1 August 2015	Free
8	Sam Foley	CM	(Republic of Ireland)	St Albans (ENG)	17 October 1986 (aged 32)	68	5	Port Vale	22 May 2017	Free
10	Joe Powell	AM	(England)	England	30 October 1998 (aged 20)	10	2	West Ham United	21 January 2019	Loan
11	Daniel Powell	W	(England)	Luton	12 March 1991 (aged 28)	73	8	Milton Keynes Dons	5 May 2017	Free
15	Dean Bowditch	AM	(England)	Bishop's Stortford	15 June 1986 (aged 32)	50	5	Milton Keynes Dons	23 June 2017	Free
17	Shaun McWilliams	CM	(England)	Northampton	14 August 1998 (aged 20)	56	0	Academy	30 April 2016	N/A
19	Jack Bridge	AM	(England)	Southend	21 September 1995 (aged 23)	36	3	Southend United	5 January 2018	Free
21	John-Joe O'Toole	CM	(Republic of Ireland)	Harrow (ENG)	30 September 1988 (aged 30)	194	35	Bristol Rovers	30 June 2014	Free
22	Timi Elšnik	CM	(Slovenia)	Zlatoličje	29 April 1998 (aged 21)	9	1	Derby County	25 January 2019	Loan
24	Sean Whaler	RM	(England)	Northampton	22 July 2000 (aged 18)	2	0	Academy	17 May 2018	N/A
28	Morgan Roberts	LM	(Wales)	Northampton (ENG)	20 December 2000 (aged 18)	5	0	Academy	17 May 2018	N/A
33	Scott Pollock	CM	(England)	Northampton	12 March 2001 (aged 18)	5	0	Football & Education Programme	26 March 2019	N/A
Forwards
9	Andy Williams	CF	(England)	Hereford	14 August 1986 (aged 32)	44	12	Doncaster Rovers	25 May 2018	Free
14	Junior Morias	CF	(Jamaica)	Kingston	5 July 1995 (aged 23)	23	6	Peterborough United	13 July 2018	Undisclosed
23	Joe Iaciofano	CF	(England)	Northampton	10 September 1998 (aged 20)	5	0	Academy	4 October 2016	N/A
27	Marvin Sordell	CF	(England)	Pinner	17 February 1991 (aged 28)	8	0	Burton Albion	31 January 2019	Loan

== Pre-season ==
The Cobblers announced they would face Northampton Sileby Rangers, St. Albans City, Brackley Town, Hull City U23, Barnet and Manchester United XI.

3 July 2018 Friendly	Northampton Sileby Rangers	0–2	Northampton Town	Northampton
19:45 BST		Report	M.Roberts 72'; S.Foley 86'	Stadium: Fernie Fields; Referee: Andy Woolmer

7 July 2018 Friendly	St Albans City	0–4	Northampton Town	St Albans
12:30 BST		Report	D.Powell 8', 10'; B.Waters 68', 84'	Stadium: Clarence Park

10 July 2018 Friendly	Brackley Town	0–1	Northampton Town	Brackley
19:45 BST		Report	A.Williams 54'	Stadium: St James Park; Attendance: 380

19 July 2018 Friendly	Northampton Town	3–1	Hull City U23	Orihuela, Spain
17:30 BST	S.Hoskins 62'; A.Pierre 82'; S.McWilliams 87'	Report	54'	Stadium: Real Club de Golf Campoamor Resort

24 July 2018 Friendly	Northampton Town	3–0	Barnet	Sixfields
19:45 BST	A.Williams 22'; S.Hoskins 30'; B.Waters 78'	Report		Stadium: Sixfields Stadium; Attendance: 883; Referee: Andy Woolmer / Dean Whitestone

27 July 2018 Friendly	Northampton Town	2–0	Manchester United XI	Sixfields
17:30 BST	B.Waters 73'; K.Van Veen 84'	Report		Stadium: Sixfields Stadium; Attendance: 3,241; Referee: Will Finnie

== Competitions ==
=== EFL League Two ===
==== League table ====
Pos	Team	Pld	W	D	L	GF	GA	GD	Pts
13	Swindon Town	46	16	16	14	59	56	+3	64
14	Oldham Athletic	46	16	14	16	67	60	+7	62
15	Northampton Town	46	14	19	13	64	63	+1	61
16	Cheltenham Town	46	15	12	19	57	68	−11	57
17	Grimsby Town	46	16	8	22	45	56	−11	56

Source: EFL Official Website
Rules for classification: 1) Points; 2) Goal difference; 3) Number of goals scored; 4) Head-to-head results

==== Results summary ====
Overall								Home						Away					
Pld	W	D	L	GF	GA	GD	Pts	W	D	L	GF	GA	GD	W	D	L	GF	GA	GD
46	14	19	13	62	61	+1	61	7	12	3	27	22	+5	7	7	10	35	39	−4

Last updated: 23 March 2019.

==== League position by match ====
Round	1	2	3	4	5	6	7	8	9	10	11	12	13	14	15	16	17	18	19	20	21	22	23	24	25	26	27	28	29	30	31	32	33	34	35	36	37	38	39	40	41	42	43	44	45	46
Ground	H	A	H	A	A	H	H	A	H	A	H	A	H	A	A	H	H	A	H	A	A	H	A	H	H	A	H	A	H	H	A	A	H	A	A	H	H	A	A	H	A	H	H	A	H	A
Result	L	D	D	L	W	D	L	L	D	L	D	D	W	L	W	W	W	D	D	L	W	D	D	D	D	L	W	L	D	L	W	D	D	W	W	W	W	D	L	L	D	D	W	L	D	W
Position	18	17	20	21	16	18	20	20	20	21	21	22	19	19	18	18	15	14	15	17	14	14	14	15	16	16	16	16	17	17	16	16	16	16	16	14	11	11	13	14	14	15	15	15	15	15

Updated to match(es) played on 2 February 2019. Source: BBC Sport
A = Away; H = Home; W = Win; D = Draw; L = Loss

==== Matches ====
Win Draw Loss

4 August 2018 1	Northampton Town	0–1	Lincoln City	Northampton
15:00 BST		Report	M.Green 48'	Stadium: Sixfields Stadium; Attendance: 6,242 (1,453); Referee: Lee Swabey

11 August 2018 2	Carlisle United	2–2	Northampton Town	Carlisle
15:00 BST	J.Devitt 30'; H.Hope 63'	Report	K.Van Veen 40'; M.Crooks 62'	Stadium: Brunton Park; Attendance: 4,521 (349); Referee: Tom Nield

18 August 2018 3	Northampton Town	2–2	Cambridge United	Northampton
15:00 BST	K.Van Veen 58', 76'	Report	G.Maris 70'; G.Deegan 86'	Stadium: Sixfields Stadium; Attendance: 5,047 (652); Referee: Seb Stockbridge

21 August 2018 4	Morecambe	1–0	Northampton Town	Morecambe
19:45 BST	AJ.Leitch-Smith 45+2'; B.Roche (red card) 86'	Report		Stadium: Globe Arena; Attendance: 1,594; Referee: Mark Heywood

25 August 2018 5	Colchester United	1–2	Northampton Town	Colchester
15:00 BST	A.Pierre 90+4' (o.g.)	Report	M.Crooks 48'; B.Waters 90+1'	Stadium: Colchester Community Stadium; Attendance: 3,791 (480); Referee: Alan Young

1 September 2018 6	Northampton Town	1–1	Tranmere Rovers	Northampton
15:00 BST	J.Morias 61'	Report	J.Norwood 51'	Stadium: Sixfields Stadium; Attendance: 4,916 (691); Referee: Nick Kinseley

8 September 2018 7	Northampton Town	1–3	Cheltenham Town	Northampton
15:00 BST	K.Van Veen 62' (pen.)	Report	W.Boyle 36'; C.Thomas 77' (pen.); K.Mooney 83'	Stadium: Sixfields Stadium; Attendance: 4,608 (223); Referee: Lee Collins

15 September 2018 8	Port Vale	2–0	Northampton Town	Burslem
15:00 BST	B.Whitfield 24'; M.Oyeleke 69'	Report	A.Pierre (red card) 59'	Stadium: Vale Park; Attendance: 4,474 (429); Referee: Thomas Bramall

22 September 2018 9	Northampton Town	0–0	Notts County	Northampton
15:00 BST		Report		Stadium: Sixfields Stadium; Attendance: 4,935 (640); Referee: Paul Marsden

29 September 2018 10	Mansfield Town	4–0	Northampton Town	Mansfield
15:00 BST	T.Elšnik 5'; D.Rose 57', 86'; CJ.Hamilton 81'	Report		Stadium: Field Mill; Attendance: 4,550 (485); Referee: Trevor Kettle

2 October 2018 11	Northampton Town	0–0	Bury	Northampton
19:45 BST		Report		Stadium: Sixfields Stadium; Attendance: 4,073 (170); Referee: Chris Sarginson

6 October 2018 12	Swindon Town	1–1	Northampton Town	Swindon
19:45 BST	M.Taylor 73'	Report	JJ.O'Toole 60'	Stadium: County Ground; Attendance: 6,138 (504); Referee: Neil Hair

13 October 2018 13	Northampton Town	2–1	Forest Green Rovers	Northampton
14:00 BST	A.Pierre 63'; A.Williams 90+7'	Report	R.Reid 43'	Stadium: Sixfields Stadium; Attendance: 5,073 (234); Referee: Ollie Yates

20 October 2018 14	Milton Keynes Dons	1–0	Northampton Town	Bletchley
15:00 BST	K.Agard 44'	Report		Stadium: Stadium MK; Attendance: 9,618 (2,186); Referee: Brett Huxtable

23 October 2018 15	Macclesfield Town	0–5	Northampton Town	Macclesfield
19:45 BST		Report	M.Crooks 23', 33', 43'; D.Powell 34'; A.Pierre 90+3'	Stadium: Moss Rose; Attendance: 1,517 (339); Referee: Seb Stockbridge

27 October 2018 16	Northampton Town	2–1	Oldham Athletic	Northampton
15:00 BST	JJ.O'Toole 36'; S.Foley (red card) 42'; K.Van Veen 45' (pen.)	Report	R.Hunt 72'	Stadium: Sixfields Stadium; Attendance: 4,767 (351); Referee: Charles Breakspear

3 November 2018 17	Northampton Town	2–0	Crewe Alexandra	Northampton
15:00 GMT	A.Williams 19'; D.Powell 81'	Report		Stadium: Sixfields Stadium; Attendance: 5,401 (309); Referee: Scott Oldham

17 November 2018 18	Exeter City	2–2	Northampton Town	Exeter
15:00 GMT	J.Taylor 14'; J.Stockley 43'	Report	B.Waters 26'; J.Stockley 90' (o.g.)	Stadium: St James Park; Attendance: 4,332 (339); Referee: Peter Wright

24 November 2018 19	Northampton Town	2–2	Grimsby Town	Northampton
15:00 GMT	A.Williams 4'; K.Van Veen 74'	Report	C.Verman 36'; H.Cardwell 80'; D.Collins (red card) 86'	Stadium: Sixfields Stadium; Attendance: 5,594 (698); Referee: Trevor Kettle

27 November 2018 20	Newport County	3–1	Northampton Town	Newport, Wales
19:45 GMT	J.Sheehan 5'; J.Matt 31'; P.Amond 33'	Report	A.Williams 11'	Stadium: Rodney Parade; Attendance: 2,730 (214); Referee: Andy Davies

8 December 2018 21	Crawley Town	0–1	Northampton Town	Crawley
15:00 GMT	O.Palmer (red card) 55'	Report	K.Van Veen 53' (pen.)	Stadium: Broadfield Stadium; Attendance: 2,389 (499); Referee: Craig Hicks

15 December 2018 22	Northampton Town	1–1	Stevenage	Northampton
15:00 GMT	D.Bowditch 45+2'	Report	B.Kennedy 75'	Stadium: Sixfields Stadium; Attendance: 4,746 (340); Referee: Chris Sarginson

22 December 2018 23	Yeovil Town	1–1	Northampton Town	Yeovil
15:00 GMT	Y.Arquin 89'	Report	A.Williams 88'	Stadium: Huish Park; Attendance: 3,193 (276); Referee: Robert Lewis

26 December 2018 24	Northampton Town	1–1	Swindon Town	Northampton
15:00 GMT	A.Williams 6'	Report	K.Anderson 63'	Stadium: Sixfields Stadium; Attendance: 5,759 (841); Referee: Antony Coggins

29 December 2018 25	Northampton Town	2–2	Milton Keynes Dons	Northampton
15:00 GMT	A.Williams 78'; J.Morias 90+1'	Report	A.Gilbey 19'; C.Aneke 69'	Stadium: Sixfields Stadium; Attendance: 6,963 (1,449); Referee: Graham Scott

1 January 2019 26	Forest Green Rovers	2–1	Northampton Town	Nailsworth
15:00 GMT	G.Williams 1'; T.Archibald 90+4'	Report	S.Foley 50'	Stadium: The New Lawn; Attendance: 2,909 (593); Referee: Kevin Johnson

12 January 2019 27	Northampton Town	3–0	Carlisle United	Northampton
15:00 GMT	J.Bridge 48', 62'; J.Morias 72'	Report		Stadium: Sixfields Stadium; Attendance: 4,875 (484); Referee: Lee Swabey

19 January 2019 28	Cambridge United	3–2	Northampton Town	Cambridge
15:00 GMT	J.Brown 45+4'; G.Taft 64'; D.Amoo 90+4'	Report	A.Pierre 27'; J.Morias 48'	Stadium: Abbey Stadium; Attendance: 4,849 (918); Referee: Martin Coy

26 January 2019 29	Northampton Town	1–1	Morecambe	Northampton
14:00 GMT	T.Elšnik 22'	Report	R.Bennett 52'	Stadium: Sixfields Stadium; Attendance: 4,512 (96); Referee: Lee Collins

2 February 2019 30	Northampton Town	0–4	Colchester United	Northampton
15:00 GMT		Report	F.Nouble 25'; A.Eisa 50'; K.Vincent-Young 53'; S.Szmodics 67'	Stadium: Sixfields Stadium; Attendance: 4,796 (405); Referee: Ross Joyce

5 February 2019 31	Tranmere Rovers	1–2	Northampton Town	Birkenhead
19:45 GMT	J.Norwood 25'	Report	S.Hoskins 2', 45+3'	Stadium: Prenton Park; Attendance: 5,098 (170); Referee: Paul Marsden

9 February 2019 32	Lincoln City	1–1	Northampton Town	Lincoln
15:00 GMT	B.Andrade 27'; H.Anderson (red card) 42'	Report	A.Pierre 45+5'	Stadium: Sincil Bank; Attendance: 9,352 (482); Referee: Michael Salisbury

16 February 2019 33	Northampton Town	0–0	Crawley Town	Northampton
15:00 GMT		Report		Stadium: Sixfields Stadium; Attendance: 4,581 (123); Referee: Nick Kinseley

23 February 2019 34	Stevenage	1–2	Northampton Town	Stevenage
15:00 GMT	A.Revell 79'	Report	J.Powell 19'; A.Williams 90+1'	Stadium: Broadhall Way; Attendance: 3,540 (685); Referee: Lee Swabey

2 March 2019 35	Crewe Alexandra	0–2	Northampton Town	Crewe
15:00 GMT		Report	D.Powell 28'; JJ.O'Toole 32'	Stadium: Gresty Road; Attendance: 4,096 (632); Referee: Lee Collins

9 March 2019 36	Northampton Town	2–1	Exeter City	Northampton
14:00 BST	A.Pierre 32'; A.Williams 56'	Report	A.Martin 61'	Stadium: Sixfields Stadium; Attendance: 4,954 (412); Referee: Andy Haines

12 March 2019 37	Northampton Town	1–0	Newport County	Northampton
19:45 BST	J.Powell 88'	Report		Stadium: Sixfields Stadium; Attendance: 4,064 (98); Referee: Antony Coggins

16 March 2019 38	Grimsby Town	0–0	Northampton Town	Cleethorpes
15:00 BST		Report		Stadium: Blundell Park; Attendance: 3,890 (398); Referee: Ollie Yates

23 March 2019 39	Cheltenham Town	3–1	Northampton Town	Cheltenham
15:00 BST	L.Varney 18', 41' (pen.); T.Barnett 73'	Report	D.Bowditch 89'	Stadium: Whaddon Road; Attendance: 3,513 (638); Referee: Charles Breakspear

30 March 2019 40	Northampton Town	1–2	Port Vale	Northampton
15:00 BST	S.Hoskins 5'	Report	L.Legge (red card) 42'; D.Worrall 44'; T.Pope 75' (pen.)	Stadium: Sixfields Stadium; Attendance: 5,651 (400); Referee: Neil Hair

6 April 2019 41	Notts County	2–2	Northampton Town	Nottingham
15:00 BST	M.Rose 27'; R.Schofield (red card) 46'; K.Hemmings 52'	Report	D.Powell 44'; S.Hoskins 50'	Stadium: Meadow Lane; Attendance: 7,129 (934); Referee: Ben Toner

13 April 2019 42	Northampton Town	1–1	Mansfield Town	Northampton
15:00 BST	S.Foley 69'	Report	M.Benning 11'	Stadium: Sixfields Stadium; Attendance: 5,905 (1,465); Referee: Paul Marsden

19 April 2019 43	Northampton Town	3–1	Macclesfield Town	Northampton
15:00 BST	D.Bowditch 25'; D.Powell 54'; J.Morias 90+2'	Report	H.Smith 38'	Stadium: Sixfields Stadium; Attendance: 4,925 (283); Referee: Kevin Johnson

22 April 2019 44	Bury	3–1	Northampton Town	Bury
15:00 BST	C.Stokes 39'; D.Mayor 65'; N.Maynard 90+5'	Report	A.Williams 27'	Stadium: Gigg Lane; Attendance: 4,407 (254); Referee: Michael Salisbury

27 April 2019 45	Northampton Town	2–2	Yeovil Town	Northampton
15:00 BST	O.Sowunmi 49' (o.g.); D.Powell 55'	Report	T.Abrahams 18' (pen.); J.Gray 24'	Stadium: Sixfields Stadium; Attendance: 4,908 (317); Referee: Anthony Backhouse

4 May 2019 46	Oldham Athletic	2–5	Northampton Town	Oldham
15:00 BST	J.Branger 11'; C.Lang 64'	Report	S.Hoskins 22'; A.Pierre 29'; A.Williams 44', 49'; J.Morias 80'	Stadium: Boundary Park; Attendance: 5,291 (452); Referee: Thomas Bramall

=== FA Cup ===
The first round draw was made live on BBC by Dennis Wise and Dion Dublin on 22 October.

10 November 2018 First round	Lincoln City	3–2	Northampton Town	Lincoln
15:00 GMT	H.Anderson 16'; T.Pett 52'; B.Andrade 90+2'	Report	J.Bridge 55'; K.Van Veen 81'; J.Morias (red card) 90+9'	Stadium: Sincil Bank; Attendance: 6,012 (568); Referee: Graham Salisbury

=== EFL Cup ===
On 15 June 2018, the draw for the first round was made in Vietnam.

13 August 2018 First round	Wycombe Wanderers	1–1 (7–6 p)	Northampton Town	High Wycombe
19:45 BST	R.Williams 50'	Report	S.Hoskins 82'	Stadium: Adams Park; Attendance: 1,999 (427); Referee: Steve Martin
	Penalties
	J.Jacobson (penalty scored); B.Morris (penalty scored); J.McCarthy (penalty scored); C.Mackail-Smith (penalty missed); S.Kashket (penalty scored); C.Thompson (penalty scored); D.Gape (penalty scored); A.El-Abd (penalty scored)		D.Bowditch (penalty scored); S.Hoskins (penalty missed); S.Foley (penalty scored); B.Waters (penalty scored); A.Taylor (penalty scored); J.Bridge (penalty scored); S.Facey (penalty scored); J.Turnbull (penalty missed)

=== EFL Trophy ===
On 13 July 2018, the initial group stage draw bar the U21 invited clubs was announced. The draw for the second round was made live on Talksport by Leon Britton and Steve Claridge on 16 November. On 8 December, the third round draw was drawn by Alan McInally and Matt Le Tissier on Soccer Saturday.

Pos	Lge	Team	Pld	W	PW	PL	L	GF	GA	GD	Pts	Qualification
1	L1	Oxford United (Q)	3	2	0	0	1	7	2	+5	6	Round 2
2	L2	Northampton Town (Q)	3	2	0	0	1	4	2	+2	6	Round 2
3	L1	Wycombe Wanderers (E)	3	2	0	0	1	3	4	−1	6	
4	ACA	Fulham U21 (E)	3	0	0	0	3	1	7	−6	0	

First match(es) will be played: 4 September 2018. Source: EFL.com
(E) Eliminated; (Q) Qualified to the phase indicated

4 September 2018 Group stage	Northampton Town	0–1	Wycombe Wanderers	Northampton
19:45 BST		Report	S.Kashket 11'	Stadium: Sixfields Stadium; Attendance: 1,053 (156); Referee: Darren Drysdale

9 October 2018 Group stage	Oxford United	1–2	Northampton Town	Oxford
19:45 BST	J.Henry 24'	Report	K.Van Veen 55'; A.Pierre 65'; JJ.O'Toole (red card) 90'	Stadium: Kassam Stadium; Attendance: 929 (117); Referee: Kevin Johnson

6 November 2018 Group stage	Northampton Town	2–0	Fulham U21s	Northampton
19:45 GMT	A.Pierre 17'; S.Hoskins 20'	Report		Stadium: Sixfields Stadium; Attendance: 1,059 (38); Referee: John Busby

4 December 2018 Second round	Cambridge United	1–1 (2–4 p)	Northampton Town	Cambridge
19:45 GMT	G.Maris 9'	Report	K.Van Veen 89'	Stadium: Abbey Stadium; Attendance: 648 (134); Referee: Brett Huxtable
	Penalties
	A.Azeez (penalty missed); J.Brown (penalty missed); D.Amoo (penalty scored); R.Lambe (penalty missed)		K.Van Veen (penalty scored); A.Taylor (penalty missed); S.Foley (penalty scored); B.Waters (penalty scored); S.McWilliams (penalty scored)

8 January 2019 Third round	Northampton Town	1–2	Bristol Rovers	Northampton
19:45 GMT	M.Crooks 76'	Report	T.Broadbent 45'; S.Payne 58'	Stadium: Sixfields Stadium; Attendance: 1,312 (97); Referee: Charles Breakspear

=== Appearances, goals and cards ===
No.	Pos	Player	League One			FA Cup			EFL Cup			EFL Trophy			Total			Discipline	
No.	Pos	Player	Starts	Sub	Goals	Starts	Sub	Goals	Starts	Sub	Goals	Starts	Sub	Goals	Starts	Sub	Goals	Booked	Sent off (straight red)
1	GK	David Cornell	46	–	–	1	–	–	–	–	–	1	–	–	48	–	–	4	–
2	RB	Shay Facey	21	2	–	–	–	–	1	–	–	3	–	–	25	2	–	4	–
3	LB	David Buchanan	37	2	–	1	–	–	–	–	–	4	–	–	42	2	–	4	–
4	CB	Charlie Goode	17	–	–	–	–	–	–	–	–	–	–	–	17	–	–	9	–
6	CB	Ash Taylor	32	1	–	–	–	–	1	–	–	2	–	–	35	1	–	6	–
7	AM	Sam Hoskins	40	2	5	1	–	–	–	1	1	2	–	1	43	3	7	10	–
8	CM	Sam Foley	33	3	2	–	–	–	1	–	–	3	–	–	37	3	2	8	1
9	ST	Andy Williams	26	13	12	1	–	–	–	–	–	3	1	–	30	14	12	–	–
10	AM	Joe Powell	6	4	2	–	–	–	–	–	–	–	–	–	6	4	2	2	–
11	W	Daniel Powell	17	18	6	–	1	–	–	–	–	3	2	–	20	21	6	1	–
12	LB	George Cox	4	1	–	–	–	–	–	–	–	–	–	–	4	1	–	–	–
14	ST	Junior Morias	7	12	6	–	1	–	1	–	–	2	–	–	10	13	6	–	1
15	AM	Dean Bowditch	9	11	3	–	–	–	1	–	–	3	–	–	13	11	3	3	–
16	CB	Aaron Pierre	41	–	6	1	–	–	–	–	–	2	1	2	44	1	8	11	1
17	CM	Shaun McWilliams	21	4	–	1	–	–	–	–	–	3	–	–	25	4	–	7	–
18	CB	Jordan Turnbull	30	1	–	1	–	–	1	–	–	4	–	–	36	1	–	6	–
19	AM	Jack Bridge	17	11	2	1	–	1	1	–	–	–	2	–	19	13	3	1	–
20	ST	Billy Waters	5	10	2	–	–	–	1	–	–	4	–	–	10	10	2	2	–
21	CM	John-Joe O'Toole	24	7	3	1	–	–	–	–	–	2	–	–	27	7	3	8	1
22	CM	Timi Elšnik	4	5	1	–	–	–	–	–	–	–	–	–	4	5	1	2	–
27	ST	Marvin Sordell	5	3	–	–	–	–	–	–	–	–	–	–	5	3	–	–	–
30	GK	Luke Coddington	–	–	–	–	–	–	–	–	–	–	–	–	–	–	–	–	–
Youth team scholars:
13	GK	James Goff	–	–	–	–	–	–	–	–	–	–	–	–	–	–	–	–	–
23	ST	Joe Iaciofano	–	–	–	–	–	–	–	–	–	–	1	–	–	1	–	–	–
24	RM	Sean Whaler	–	–	–	–	–	–	–	–	–	–	2	–	–	2	–	–	–
28	LM	Morgan Roberts	–	3	–	–	–	–	–	–	–	–	1	–	–	4	–	–	–
29	CB	Ryan Hughes	1	–	–	–	–	–	–	–	–	–	–	–	1	–	–	1	–
31	CB	Jay Williams	6	4	–	–	–	–	–	–	–	4	–	–	10	4	–	3	–
33	CM	Scott Pollock	4	1	–	–	–	–	–	–	–	–	–	–	4	1	–	–	–
35	RB	Camron McWilliams	–	–	–	–	–	–	–	–	–	–	1	–	–	1	–	1	–
Players no longer at the club:
4	RB	Hakeem Odoffin	10	2	–	1	–	–	–	–	–	2	1	–	13	3	–	1	–
5	CB	Leon Barnett	4	–	–	–	–	–	1	–	–	1	–	–	6	–	–	2	–
10	ST	Kevin van Veen	20	5	7	1	–	1	–	–	–	1	1	2	22	6	10	8	–
22	CM	Matt Crooks	19	2	5	–	–	–	1	–	–	1	–	1	21	2	6	7	–
34	GK	Lewis Ward	–	–	–	–	–	–	1	–	–	4	–	–	5	–	–	–	–

== Awards ==
=== Club awards ===
At the end of the season, Northampton's annual award ceremony, including categories voted for by the players and backroom staff, the supporters, will see the players recognised for their achievements for the club throughout the 2018–19 season.

Player of the Year Award	Aaron Pierre
Players' Player of the Year Award	David Cornell
Academy Player of the Year Award	Jay Williams
Goal of the Season Award	Sam Hoskins (vs. Tranmere Rovers)

== Transfers ==
=== Transfers in ===
Date from	Position	Nationality	Name	From	Fee	Ref.
1 July 2018	CF	(England)	Andy Williams	Doncaster Rovers	Free transfer	
9 July 2018	RB	(England)	Hakeem Odoffin	Wolverhampton Wanderers	Free transfer	
13 July 2018	CF	(Jamaica)	Junior Morias	Peterborough United	Undisclosed	

=== Transfers out ===
Date from	Position	Nationality	Name	To	Fee	Ref.
1 July 2018	LB	(England)	Raheem Hanley	Free agent	Released	
1 July 2018	CF	(England)	Leon Lobjoit	Brackley Town	Released	
1 July 2018	CF	(Netherlands)	Kevin Luckassen	(Netherlands) Almere City	Released	
1 July 2018	RB	(Republic of Ireland)	Brendan Moloney	Free agent	Released	
1 July 2018	GK	(England)	Richard O'Donnell	Bradford City	Released	
1 July 2018	RB	(England)	Aaron Phillips	Free agent	Released	
26 November 2018	CB	(England)	Leon Barnett	N/A	Retired	
2 January 2019	CF	(Netherlands)	Kevin van Veen	Scunthorpe United	£100,000	
4 January 2019	CM	(Iraq)	Yaser Kasim	Free agent	Mutual consent	
11 January 2019	CM	(England)	Matt Crooks	Rotherham United	Undisclosed	
30 January 2019	RB	(England)	Hakeem Odoffin	(Scotland) Livingston	Free Transfer	

=== Loans in ===
Start date	Position	Nationality	Name	From	End date	Ref.
1 July 2018	GK	(England)	Lewis Ward	Reading	13 January 2019	
7 January 2019	LB	(England)	George Cox	Brighton & Hove Albion	31 May 2019	
21 January 2019	AM	(England)	Joe Powell	West Ham United	31 May 2019	
25 January 2019	CM	(Slovenia)	Timi Elšnik	Derby County	31 May 2019	
31 January 2019	CB	(England)	Charlie Goode	Scunthorpe United	31 May 2019	
31 January 2019	CF	(England)	Marvin Sordell	Burton Albion	31 May 2019	

=== Loans out ===
Start date	Position	Nationality	Name	To	End date	Ref.
1 July 2018	LB	(England)	Joe Bunney	Blackpool	30 January 2019	
5 August 2018	GK	(England)	James Goff	Banbury United	9 September 2018	
23 November 2018	CF	(England)	Joe Iaciofano	AFC Mansfield	4 February 2019	
23 November 2018	AM	(England)	Sean Whaler	AFC Mansfield	4 February 2019	
22 December 2018	FW	(England)	Jack Daldy	St Neots Town	Work experience	
22 December 2018	CB	(England)	Ryan Hughes	St Neots Town	Work experience	
22 December 2018	GK	(England)	Bradley Lashley	Wellingborough Town	Work experience	
4 January 2019	MF	(England)	Scott Pollock	St Neots Town	12 January 2019	
11 January 2019	SS	(England)	Billy Waters	Cheltenham Town	31 May 2019	
31 January 2019	LB	(England)	Joe Bunney	Rochdale	31 May 2019	
5 February 2019	AM	(England)	Sean Whaler	Banbury United	March 2019	
21 February 2019	MF	(England)	Camron McWilliams	Corby Town	Work experience	
26 February 2019	CF	(England)	Joe Iaciofano	Banbury United	31 May 2019	
