= Katia Kouyaté =

English footballer (born 2003)

Personal information
- Full name: Mohamed Katia Kouyaté
- Date of birth: 9 September 2003 (age 23)
- Place of birth: Manchester, England
- Height: 1.84 m (6 ft 0 in)
- Positions: Left winger; centre forward

Team information
- Current team: Barrow
- Number: 17

Youth career
- 2011–2024: Everton

Senior career*
Years	Team	Apps	(Gls)
2024–	Barrow	21	(0)
2025	→ Spennymoor Town (loan)	5	(0)
2026	→ Warrington Town (loan)	5	(0)
- * Club domestic league appearances and goals as of 19:25, 12 September 2025 (UTC)

Mohamed Katia Kouyaté (born 9 September 2003) is an English footballer who plays as a left winger and centre forward for National League club Barrow.

== Career ==
Born in Manchester, Kouyaté joined Everton at the age of 8. He signed his first professional contract in September 2020. In September 2022, he signed a new two-year contract with the club. He scored his first senior goal in July 2023 in a friendly match.

After leaving Everton, he signed a three-year contract with Barrow in June 2024. He thanked the club for showing "faith" and "confidence" in him.

On 12 September 2025, he joined National League North club Spennymoor Town on loan until January 2026.

In January 2026, he went out on loan again, dropping a division to sign for Northern Premier League Premier Division side Warrington Town on an initial one-month loan.

== Playing style ==
Kouyaté plays as a left winger and centre forward. Upon signing for Barrow in June 2024, he described himself by saying "I play anywhere across the front three but predominantly on the left or down the middle. I'm a quick and direct player who likes to take people on one versus one, I like to make things happen and I like to get myself on the scoreboard". He has also been praised for his "naturally impressive physique, lightning speed and awe-inspiring power".

== Personal life ==
Kouyaté is of Ivorian descent.

== Career statistics ==
As of match played 3 May 2025

Appearances and goals by club, season and competition
Club	Season	League			FA Cup		League Cup		Other		Total	
Club	Season	Division	Apps	Goals	Apps	Goals	Apps	Goals	Apps	Goals	Apps	Goals
Everton U21	2021–22	—			—		—		1 (Note: Appearance(s) in EFL Trophy)	0	1	0
Everton U21	2022–23	—			—		—		5	0	5	0
Everton U21	2023–24	—			—		—		2	0	2	0
Everton U21	Total		—		—		—		8	0	8	0
Barrow	2024–25	League Two	21	0	1	0	3	0	3	0	28	0
Career total			21	0	1	0	3	0	11	0	36	0
