= Junior Tiensia =

English footballer (born 2000)

Personal information
- Full name: Junior Yoann Peniel Tiensia
- Date of birth: 25 December 2000 (age 25)
- Height: 1.77 m (5 ft 10 in)
- Position: Left back

Team information
- Current team: Solihull Moors

Youth career
- –2019: Millwall

Senior career*
Years	Team	Apps	(Gls)
2019–2022	Millwall	0	(0)
2020	→ Havant & Waterlooville (loan)	5	(0)
2021	→ Sutton United (loan)	1	(0)
2021–2022	→ Dover Athletic (loan)	13	(0)
2022	→ Dartford (loan)	2	(0)
2022–2023	Gloucester City	26	(0)
2023	Solihull Moors	7	(0)
2023–2025	Barrow	17	(0)
2025–2026	Wealdstone	31	(1)
2026–	Solihull Moors	0	(0)
- * Club domestic league appearances and goals as of 11:34, 3 July 2026 (UTC)

Junior Tiensia (born 25 December 2000) is an English professional footballer who plays as a left back for National League club Solihull Moors.

== Career ==
Tiensia came through the youth system at Millwall, and spent time on loan at Havant & Waterlooville, Sutton United, Dover Athletic and Dartford, before being released in summer 2022. He subsequently signed for National League North side Gloucester City in October 2022, then moved to Solihull Moors in March 2023.

On 19 May 2023, Tiensia signed for EFL League Two side Barrow. He made his Football League debut on 5 August in a 2–1 victory over Tranmere Rovers at Prenton Park, and featured regularly for the side, before suffering a knee injury in October that ultimately ended his season. He returned to the side in December 2024, and made 8 league appearances in 2024–2025. He left Barrow at the end of the season, upon the expiry of his contract.

On 12 June 2025, Tiensia signed for National League side Wealdstone. On 14 March 2026, he scored his first senior goal in a 5–1 victory over Solihull Moors. He appeared as a half time substitute in the 2026 FA Trophy final, in what would be his final appearance for the club.

On 30 June 2026, Tiensia rejoined Solihull Moors.

== Honours ==
Wealdstone

- FA Trophy runner-up: 2025–26
