= Wyll Stanway =

English footballer

Personal information
- Full name: Wylliam Sam Stanway
- Date of birth: 21 May 2001 (age 25)
- Place of birth: Barrow-in-Furness, England
- Height: 1.93 m (6 ft 4 in)
- Position: Goalkeeper

Team information
- Current team: Cheltenham Town
- Number: 23

Youth career
- Barrow
- Holker Old Boys

Senior career*
Years	Team	Apps	(Gls)
2021	Furness Rovers		
2021–2022	Holker Old Boys	12	(0)
2021–2022	→ Lancaster City (dual registration)	5	(0)
2022–2024	Chester	57	(0)
2022	→ FC United of Manchester (loan)	7	(0)
2022	→ Bootle (loan)	5	(0)
2022–2023	→ Macclesfield (loan)	20	(0)
2024–2026	Barrow	60	(0)
2026–	Cheltenham Town	16	(0)

International career^{‡}
2024	England C	1	(0)
- * Club domestic league appearances and goals as of 22:20, 21 November 2026 (UTC) ‡ National team caps and goals as of 8 April 2024 (UTC)

Wylliam Sam Stanway (born 21 May 2001) is an English professional footballer and former cricketer who currently plays as a goalkeeper for EFL League Two club Cheltenham Town. In cricket, Stanway represented Cumbria.

== Early life and cricket ==
Wylliam Sam Stanway was born on 21 May 2001 in Barrow-in-Furness in Cumbria. He is one of four siblings, with a younger brother and two older half-siblings including footballer Georgia Stanway. They are from Askam-in-Furness.

Though the siblings all played football together growing up, Stanway played club and National Counties cricket before and during his football career.

In cricket, Wyll Stanway is an all-rounder, having played for Hawcoat Park Cricket Club and Furness Cricket Club as well as grade cricket in Australia and representing Cumbria up to and including senior. When he was 17, he captained the under-18 Twenty20 team of Carrum Cricket Club in Melbourne. Stanway made his senior debut for Cumbria (then Cumberland) in 2019, and played for them in the NCCA Knockout Trophy and 2021 National Counties Championship. A noted batsman for Furness and other clubs, he had success as a bowler for Cumbria. As of 2026, he sometimes plays for Dalton Cricket Club in the Cumbria League Premier Division and has done since at least 2023.

He attended the Chetwynde School and worked part-time in the nuclear engineering industry as a support worker, having reduced his hours when he joined Chester.

== Football career ==
=== Local leagues ===
Having played in some youth teams of local club Barrow's Performance Centre, Stanway and his brothers played for Holker Old Boys as teenagers; Stanway and his younger brother had stopped playing there by 2019, at which point Wyll was focused on cricket, while older brother JP was still at the club as a striker. Continuing in local football, Wyll Stanway played as an outfield centre-back until he was 19, in early 2021, when Furness Rovers needed a substitute goalkeeper. Stanway discovered this due to the manager being a friend, and offered to "stand in net for them". As a goalkeeper, he was described as a raw talent. In June 2021 he moved from Furness Rovers to Holker Old Boys, and a few months into the 2021–22 season he also signed for Lancaster City on dual registration. He made 12 appearances for Holker Old Boys and 5 for Lancaster before, in January 2022, he transferred to Chester.

=== Chester ===
He signed for Chester on a non-contract basis until the end of the 2021–22 season, making 11 league appearances. His debut for the club in February 2022 meant he had gone from step 7 football at Furness Rovers to step 2 in seven months, reported as an "incredible rise". He was not used for a period during the season, with the manager choosing a more experienced goalkeeper instead, but returned to a starting role towards the end, including keeping a clean sheet in four of the last five games. In June 2022 he signed a one-year contract for Chester. At the time, he described his good run of form as bittersweet, due to it coming at the end of a season. His progress as a goalkeeper saw him draw attention from other clubs.

In the 2022–23 season, Stanway spent time on loan at three clubs. He joined F.C. United of Manchester on 28-day loan at the end of September 2022, where he played seven games and was named player of the match twice, including on his debut. After F.C. United he went to Bootle, intended to be until the end of the season. He was recalled from Bootle by Chester at the end of November 2022 and sent instead to Macclesfield for the remainder of the season, after Macclesfield's first-choice goalkeeper suffered an injury. With Macclesfield he won the Division One West of the Northern Premier League. Robbie Savage, a board member of the club, later revealed that Macclesfield had wanted to offer Stanway a permanent deal, but could not agree terms with Chester.

Stanway was kept under contract at Chester for the 2023–24 season, being given the number 1 shirt. By the end of January 2024, he had kept 18 clean sheets for them in the season; he finished the season with 22 clean sheets, having played every minute. He was also voted as Chester's player of the season by the club's travelling fans.

=== Barrow ===
==== 2024–25 ====
On 23 May 2024, EFL League Two side Barrow announced that they had signed Stanway to a professional two-year contract, with option for another year, for an undisclosed fee. Chester manager Calum McIntyre described the fee as "significant". Stanway was expected to be second choice behind Paul Farman, but an injury to Farman early in the season saw Stanway step up. He made his debut in the English Football League on 14 September 2024, which Barrow won 2–1 away at Grimsby Town, and was named player of the match. He was an unused substitute in the EFL Cup third-round tie against Chelsea at Stamford Bridge on 24 September, which saw Barrow knocked out of the competition. The team then won the Lancashire Senior Cup on 26 November in a 1–1 draw against Burnley Under-23s, decided by a penalty shoot-out in which Stanway made two saves.

He was re-introduced to the starting squad later in the season, and after twelve EFL appearances kept his first clean sheet in the league on 5 April 2025 with a 3–0 away victory at MK Dons: he made seven vital saves, including six inside the box, and was named in the EFL Team of the Week. Stanway followed this with four consecutive clean sheets before providing the assist for Barrow's third goal in a 3–3 draw to Bromley and ending the season with another clean sheet away. He received the club's young player of the season award.

==== 2025–26 ====
Stanway gave a highlight performance in October 2025, when Barrow played away at league leaders Walsall. Having kept three clean sheets in his previous four games, Stanway made eleven saves as Barrow went down to ten players in the 2–1 victory, setting season records for most saves in a game and ending Walsall's eight-game unbeaten run. He was named man of the match and selected to the League Two team of the week. Manager Andy Whing described him as "an old school keeper who comes for crosses. He's big, tall. He's learning the game." Stanway produced another good performance in their next game with seven saves in a draw to Barnet, after again having a player sent off.

Barrow then experienced a winless streak of six games before the winter break, with Whing and his assistant fired in December; the second time in Stanway's two years at Barrow that the manager was dismissed mid-season, he felt it was "a massive shame" but an opportunity for the team to reflect on how they could raise their level. Though with only five clean sheets by January 2026, Stanway ranked second for most saves per 90 in the league and, over the winter break, both Milton Keynes Dons F.C. and Bristol Rovers F.C. approached Barrow to acquire him. MK Dons were (successfully) chasing promotion to EFL League One and wanted to bolster their squad with a shot-stopping goalkeeper and development talent, while Bristol Rovers sought a number one choice for goal. With Stanway as Barrow's only fit goalkeeping option, they were unwilling to let him go and were indeed seeking their own back-up goalkeeper during the window; they refused MK Dons' offer and Bristol Rovers chose to walk away from negotiations.

Ending up in the relegation battle to remain in League Two, Stanway acknowledged that their last two games were tough and it may require the best performances of their season to stay up. On 2 May 2026, following a 1–2 defeat to Newport County, Barrow were relegated to the National League. Stanway made 45 appearances and conceded 73 goals across all competitions in the 2025–26 season; at the end of the season, Barrow triggered the one-year extension option in Stanway's contract.

=== Cheltenham Town ===
Barrow did not play Stanway during their 2026–27 pre-season due to negotiations with other clubs wanting to sign him. On 18 July 2026, Cheltenham Town F.C. announced that they had bought Stanway, keeping him in League Two.

== International career ==
In March 2024, he was called up to the England national football C team as one of two step 2 players in the squad, debuting as a substitute in a match against Wales C.

== Career statistics ==
As of match played 21 November 2026

Appearances and goals by club, season and competition
Club	Season	League			FA Cup		League Cup		Other		Total	
Club	Season	Division	Apps	Goals	Apps	Goals	Apps	Goals	Apps	Goals	Apps	Goals
Barrow	2024–25	League Two	17	0	1	0	0	0	2 (Note: Appearance(s) in EFL Trophy)	0	20	0
Barrow	2025–26	League Two	43	0	2	0	0	0	0	0	45	0
Barrow	Total		60	0	3	0	0	0	2	0	65	0
Cheltenham Town	2026–27	League Two	16	0	1	0	1	0	0	0	18	0
Career total			76	0	4	0	1	0	2	0	83	0

== Honours ==
Macclesfield

- Division One West: 2022–23

Barrow

- Lancashire Senior Cup: 2024

Individual

- Chester F.C. Away Travel Player of the Season: 2023–24
- Barrow A.F.C. Young Player of the Season: 2024–25
