= Sean Whaler =

English footballer

Personal information
- Full name: Sean Andrew Whaler
- Date of birth: 22 July 2000 (age 26)
- Place of birth: Northampton, England
- Position: Midfielder

Team information
- Current team: Northampton Town
- Number: 24

Youth career
- 2009–2017: Northampton Town

Senior career*
Years	Team	Apps	(Gls)
2017–2020	Northampton Town	0	(0)
2018–2019	→ AFC Mansfield (loan)	6	(1)
2019	→ Banbury United (loan)	2	(0)
- * Club domestic league appearances and goals as of 11:12, 31 March 2019 (UTC)

Sean Andrew Whaler (born 22 July 2000) is an English professional footballer who plays for Northampton Town, as a midfielder.

== Club career ==
Born in Northampton, Whaler joined Northampton Town at under-9 level and signed his first professional contract in May 2018. After featuring as an unused substitute on several occasions, Whaler made his long-awaited first-team debut during their EFL Trophy defeat to Wycombe Wanderers, replacing Shaun McWilliams in the 1–0 loss.

On 23 November 2018, Whaler was loaned out to AFC Mansfield until the 1st January 2019. The deal was then extended for another month.

On 5 February 2019, Whaler was loaned out to Banbury United after his loan at AFC Mansfield expired. He made his debut in an Oxfordshire Senior Cup quarter final against Easington Sports and scored his first goal in the sixth minute; helping Banbury to a 3–0 win. Whaler's loan ended earlier than expected as he fractured his fibula during a game.

== Career statistics ==
As of 4 September 2018.

Appearances and goals by club, season and competition
Club	Season	League			FA Cup		League Cup		Other		Total	
Club	Season	Division	Apps	Goals	Apps	Goals	Apps	Goals	Apps	Goals	Apps	Goals
Northampton Town	2017–18	League One	0	0	0	0	0	0	0	0	0	0
Northampton Town	2018–19	League Two	0	0	0	0	0	0	2 (Note: Appearance(s) in EFL Trophy.)	0	2	0
Career total			0	0	0	0	0	0	2	0	2	0
