= Tobi Adeyemo =

English footballer (born 2005)

Personal information
- Full name: Emmanuel Tobi Adeyemo
- Date of birth: 14 March 2005 (age 21)
- Place of birth: Hackney, England
- Position: Forward

Team information
- Current team: Barnsley
- Number: 7

Youth career
- 2018–2022: Watford

Senior career*
Years	Team	Apps	(Gls)
2022–2026	Watford	4	(1)
2022–2023	→ Hitchin Town (loan)	3	(0)
2024	→ Wealdstone (loan)	4	(0)
2026	→ Crawley Town (loan)	12	(1)
2026–	Barnsley	3	(0)
- * Club domestic league appearances and goals as of 16:24, 24 October 2026 (UTC)

Emmanuel Tobi Adeyemo (born 14 March 2005) is an English professional footballer who plays as a forward for EFL League One club Barnsley.

== Early Life ==
Born in the London district of Hackney, Adeyemo grew up near Tottenham. He was educated at St Ignatius Primary, where he played above his age group on the school's football team, and St Thomas More Catholic School in Wood Green.

== Career ==
=== Watford ===
Having played football for the Haringey representative side, he trialled with Arsenal through the Rap Aid Academy. An e-mail invitation to trial with Chelsea, whom he had scored against for Arsenal, was missed by his father, and by the time it was found Adeyemo was on trial with Watford, whose youth system he joined formally in October 2018. He started a two-year scholarship with the club's academy in July 2021.

Adeyemo joined Southern League Premier Division Central side Hitchin Town for one month in November 2022 on a work experience loan, with the deal later extended to 18 January 2023.

Adeyemo made his professional debut for Watford on 7 January 2023, coming on as a 75th minute substitute for Joseph Hungbo in a 2–0 away defeat to Reading in the third round of the FA Cup. On 14 January, he made his league debut, coming on as a substitute for Vakoun Issouf Bayo in the 68th minute of an EFL Championship home game against Blackpool. Just four minutes later, he scored his first professional goal, opening the score for his side, who would go on to win 2–0.

In March 2024, Adeyemo joined National League club Wealdstone on loan until the end of the season.

On 2 January 2026, Adeyemo joined League Two club Crawley Town on loan for the remainder of the 2025–26 season.

On 22 May 2026, Watford said it was discussing extension with the player.

=== Barnsley ===
On 15 October 2026, Adeyemo joined League One club Barnsley on an initial one-year deal.

== Personal life ==
Adeyemo is of Nigerian descent.

== Career statistics ==
As of match played 24 October 2026.

Appearances and goals by club, season and competition
Club	Season	League			FA Cup		EFL Cup		Other		Total	
Club	Season	Division	Apps	Goals	Apps	Goals	Apps	Goals	Apps	Goals	Apps	Goals
Watford	2022–23	Championship	4	1	1	0	0	0	—		5	1
Watford	2023–24	Championship	0	0	0	0	0	0	—		0	0
Watford	2024–25	Championship	0	0	0	0	0	0	—		0	0
Watford	2025–26	Championship	0	0	0	0	0	0	—		0	0
Watford	Total		4	1	1	0	0	0	0	0	5	1
Hitchin Town (loan)	2022–23	Southern League	3	0	0	0	—		0	0	3	0
Wealdstone (loan)	2023–24	National League	4	0	0	0	—		0	0	4	0
Crawley Town (loan)	2025–26	League Two	12	1	—		—		0	0	12	1
Barnsley	2026–27	League One	3	0	0	0	0	0	0	0	3	0
Career total			26	2	1	0	0	0	0	0	27	2
