= Theo Vassell =

English footballer (born 1997)

Personal information
- Full name: Theo Gary Carlstan Vassell
- Date of birth: 2 January 1997 (age 29)
- Place of birth: Stoke-on-Trent, England
- Height: 6 ft 0 in (1.84 m)
- Position: Defender

Youth career
- Hanley Town
- 2006–2015: Stoke City

Senior career*
Years	Team	Apps	(Gls)
2015–2016	Oldham Athletic	0	(0)
2016	→ Chorley (loan)	0	(0)
2016–2017	Walsall	0	(0)
2016–2017	→ Chester (loan)	16	(1)
2017	→ Chester (loan)	15	(0)
2017–2018	Gateshead	34	(2)
2018–2019	Port Vale	15	(0)
2019–2020	Macclesfield Town	17	(2)
2020–2021	Wrexham	31	(4)
2021–2024	Salford City	100	(5)
2024–2025	Barrow	32	(5)
2026	Crawley Town	7	(0)
- * Club domestic league appearances and goals as of 21:36, 10 February 2026 (UTC)

Theo Gary Carlstan Vassell (born 2 January 1997) is an English professional footballer who plays as a defender.

Vassell joined Oldham Athletic after leaving the Academy at Stoke City in 2015. He had a youth loan with Chorley early the following year. He signed with Walsall in July 2016 and spent the 2016–17 season on loan at Chester. He joined Gateshead in July 2017 before returning to the English Football League with Port Vale in July 2018. He moved on to Macclesfield Town in July 2019 and dropped back into the National League to join Wrexham for the 2020–21 season. He signed with Salford City in November 2021 and made 100 league appearances in close to three seasons. He spent the 2024–25 campaign with Barrow, and joined current club Crawley Town in January 2026.

== Career ==
=== Early career ===
Vassell grew up in Stoke-on-Trent and played Ladsandads football for Hanley Town before joining the Academy at Stoke City at the age of nine. Originally a forward, he later became a defender and was given a two-year scholarship contract in 2013. He had a trial at Oldham Athletic in October 2015 and was given a one-year contract with the option of a second. Upon joining the "Latics", manager David Dunn said that "he is really athletic, only 18 and definitely one for the future". On 26 February 2016, he joined National League North side Chorley on a one-month youth loan. He left Boundary Park after being released by new manager John Sheridan in May 2016.

On 8 July 2016, he signed a one-year contract with Walsall, with the option for a second. He had worked with youth team coach Dean Holden at previous club Oldham. Upon signing him at Walsall, manager Jon Whitney said that "he's quite old school. He just wanted to defend first and foremost, and then work on the technical side. He's one for the future". Four days later he joined National League side Chester on loan until January 2017, alongside "Saddlers" teammate Liam Roberts. He made his first-team debut on 6 August, during a 3–0 defeat to Gateshead at the Gateshead International Stadium. On 16 August, he scored his first goal in senior football during a 3–2 defeat at Barrow. He missed two months of action after suffering an injury at Macclesfield Town in October. He helped the "Blues" to keep 10 clean sheets during his first 16 league appearances of the 2016–17 season and manager Jon McCarthy was keen to extend the loan deal further, which he managed to do after short time back at Walsall in January. He played a total of 32 games as the "Seals" posted a 19th-place finish in the National League, but was told by Whitney that he would not be retained upon his return to the Bescot Stadium in May 2017.

He signed a one-year deal with Gateshead in July 2017 after impressing on a trial basis. On 23 September, he was sent off ten minutes into a 2–2 draw at Maidstone United following a foul on winger Zavon Hines. The "Heed" unsuccessfully appealed the decision, and manager Neil Aspin said that the decision to reject the appeal was "extremely disappointing" as "I've been in football 36 years and that is one of the worst red cards I've ever seen". Vassell went on to make 41 appearances for the "Tynesiders", scoring three goals, as the club posted a 17th-place finish under the stewardship of Steve Watson.

=== Port Vale ===
On 28 June 2018, Vassell won a move to the English Football League when he signed a one-year professional contract with EFL League Two side Port Vale, who were managed by his former Gateshead manager Neil Aspin. He made his debut in the EFL Cup on 14 August, in a 4–0 defeat to Lincoln City at Vale Park, though he entered the game as an 85th-minute substitute for Cristian Montaño with the "Valiants" already four goals down. He had to wait until the opening EFL Trophy group stage game of the campaign on 9 October for his next appearance, though he featured from the start in the 1–0 victory over EFL League One opponents Burton Albion and Aspin said after the game that his performance gave him cause to consider him for league fixtures. He enjoyed a run of games at left-wing-back in the absence of Montaño, and was praised for his performances by captain Tom Pope. However, new Vale manager John Askey confirmed that he would not be offering Vassell a new contract on 16 May.

=== Macclesfield Town ===
On 18 July 2019, Vassell joined League Two club Macclesfield Town on a one-year deal. On 1 February 2020, it was announced that he was one of three players to have left Macclesfield during the January 2020 transfer window, following a meeting with the English Football League. He followed former Macclesfield manager Sol Campbell to sign a contract with Southend United, but the deal was unable to be completed after Southend were hit with a transfer embargo.

=== Wrexham ===
On 27 August 2020, Vassell signed a one-year deal for National League club Wrexham. Manager Dean Keates said that Vassell would learn a lot playing next to club captain Shaun Pearson in defence. Vassell played 32 games in the 2020–21 campaign, scoring four goals, and was released upon the expiry of his contract.

=== Salford City ===
On 12 November 2021, Vassell signed a short-term deal with League Two side Salford City after having trained with the club for several months and recovering from tendonitis. He made his debut for the club on 20 November as a last minute substitute in a 2–0 win at Harrogate Town. He made 24 starts and three substitute appearances under Gary Bowyer in the 2021–22 campaign. In May 2022, Vassell signed a new two-year contract, saying he felt settled at the club. He played 56 of Salford's 57 games in the 2022–23 campaign, including two appearances in the play-off semi-final defeat to Stockport County. He scored his first goal of the 2023–24 season in a 3–1 win at Wrexham on 3 February after having recovered from an injury lay-off to form a strike partnership with Curtis Tilt. He was sent off 21 days later in a 5–1 defeat at Mansfield Town. He was again sent off on 6 April, in a 1–0 defeat at AFC Wimbledon, after telling the referee "that was an effing disgrace" according to manager Karl Robinson.

=== Barrow ===
On 14 July 2024, he signed a one-year deal with League Two club Barrow. He scored three goals in the first ten games of the 2024–25 campaign, and his strike in a 2–0 victory against Newport County put the Bluebirds to the top of the table on 21 September. He also made eight clearances and blocked two shots in the match, securing himself a place on the EFL Team of the Week. His good form saw him linked with Bristol Rovers, Shrewsbury Town and St Mirren in the January transfer window. On 25 January, he scored in a 3–0 win over Grimsby Town at Holker Street to secure himself a place on WhoScored's top five performers in Sky Bet League Two. He scored six goals from 39 games in the 2024–25 season, before being released upon the expiry of his contract.

=== Crawley Town ===
On 1 January 2026, he signed for League Two club Crawley Town on a six-month contract. He played seven games in the second half of the 2025–26 season, and was released upon the expiry of his short-term deal.

== Style of play ==
A defender, Vassell plays primarily as a centre-back but can also play as a full-back.

== Personal life ==
Vassell has battled with depression since childhood, which led to suicide attempts as a teenager.

== Career statistics ==
As of match played 10 February 2026

Appearances and goals by club, season and competition
Club	Season	League			FA Cup		EFL Cup		Other		Total	
Club	Season	Division	Apps	Goals	Apps	Goals	Apps	Goals	Apps	Goals	Apps	Goals
Oldham Athletic	2015–16	League One	0	0	0	0	0	0	0	0	0	0
Chorley (loan)	2015–16	National League North	0	0	0	0	—		0	0	0	0
Walsall	2016–17	League One	0	0	0	0	0	0	0	0	0	0
Chester (loan)	2016–17	National League	31	1	1	0	—		0	0	32	1
Gateshead	2017–18	National League	34	2	2	0	—		5 (Note: Appearance(s) in FA Trophy.)	1	41	3
Port Vale	2018–19	League Two	15	0	1	0	1	0	5 (Note: Appearance(s) in EFL Trophy)	0	22	0
Macclesfield Town	2019–20	League Two	17	2	0	0	2	0	1	0	20	2
Wrexham	2020–21	National League	31	4	1	0	—		0	0	32	4
Salford City	2021–22	League Two	27	1	0	0	0	0	0	0	27	1
Salford City	2022–23	League Two	45	3	2	0	1	0	8 (Note: Six appearances in EFL Trophy and two appearances in EFL League Two play-offs)	0	56	3
Salford City	2023–24	League Two	28	1	2	0	1	0	1	0	32	1
Salford City	Total		100	5	4	0	2	0	9	0	115	5
Barrow	2024–25	League Two	32	5	1	0	3	0	3	1	39	6
Crawley Town	2025–26	League Two	7	0	—		—		—		7	0
Career total			267	19	10	0	8	0	23	2	308	21
