= Elliot Newby =

English footballer (born 1995)

Personal information
- Full name: Elliot Christian Newby
- Date of birth: 21 November 1995 (age 30)
- Place of birth: Barrow-in-Furness, England
- Height: 1.77 m (5 ft 10 in)
- Position: Midfielder

Team information
- Current team: Morecambe
- Number: 11

Youth career
- –2014: Bolton Wanderers

Senior career*
| Years | Team | Apps | (Gls) |
| 2015–2017 | Barrow | 14 | (1) |
| 2016–2017 | → Altrincham (loan) | 15 | (4) |
| 2017–2018 | AFC Telford United | 38 | (7) |
| 2018–2021 | Chorley | 89 | (12) |
| 2021–2022 | Stockport County | 33 | (2) |
| 2021 | → FC Halifax Town (loan) | 11 | (0) |
| 2022 | → Altrincham (loan) | 6 | (4) |
| 2023–2026 | Barrow | 104 | (3) |
| 2026– | Morecambe | 9 | (3) |
- * Club domestic league appearances and goals as of 00:06, 3 May 2025 (UTC)

Elliot Christian Newby (born 21 November 1995) is an English professional footballer who plays as a winger for Morecambe.

== Career ==
In July 2018 he moved from AFC Telford United to Chorley. The club was promoted at the end of the season.

Newby re-signed for Barrow in January 2023.

== Personal life ==
His twin brother Alex is also footballer.

== Career statistics ==
As of match played 16 August 2022

Appearances and goals by club, season and competition
| Club | Season | League | | | FA Cup | | EFL Cup | | Other | | Total | |
| Club | Season | Division | Apps | Goals | Apps | Goals | Apps | Goals | Apps | Goals | Apps | Goals |
|---|---|---|---|---|---|---|---|---|---|---|---|---|
| Barrow | 2015–16 | National League | 13 | 1 | 1 | 0 | 0 | 0 | 1 (Note: Appearance(s) in FA Trophy) | 0 | 15 | 1 |
| Barrow | 2016–17 | National League | 1 | 0 | 0 | 0 | 0 | 0 | 0 | 0 | 1 | 0 |
| Barrow | Total | | 14 | 1 | 1 | 0 | 0 | 0 | 1 | 0 | 16 | 1 |
| Altrincham (loan) | 2016–17 | National League North | 15 | 4 | 0 | 0 | 0 | 0 | 0 | 0 | 15 | 4 |
| AFC Telford United | 2017–18 | National League North | 38 | 7 | 2 | 0 | 0 | 0 | 1 | 0 | 41 | 7 |
| Chorley | 2018–19 | National League North | 41 | 7 | 2 | 0 | 0 | 0 | 2 (Note: Appearance(s) in play-offs) | 0 | 45 | 7 |
| Chorley | 2019–20 | National League | 28 | 1 | 0 | 0 | 0 | 0 | 2 | 0 | 30 | 1 |
| Chorley | 2020–21 | National League | 18 | 4 | 4 | 1 | 0 | 0 | 0 | 0 | 22 | 5 |
| Chorley | Total | | 87 | 12 | 6 | 1 | 0 | 0 | 4 | 0 | 97 | 13 |
| Stockport County | 2020–21 | National League | 15 | 0 | 0 | 0 | 0 | 0 | 1 | 0 | 16 | 0 |
| Stockport County | 2021–22 | National League | 16 | 2 | 0 | 0 | 0 | 0 | 0 | 0 | 16 | 2 |
| Stockport County | 2022–23 | League Two | 2 | 0 | 0 | 0 | 1 | 0 | 0 | 0 | 3 | 0 |
| Stockport County | Total | | 33 | 2 | 0 | 0 | 1 | 0 | 1 | 0 | 35 | 2 |
| FC Halifax Town (loan) | 2021–22 | National League | 11 | 0 | 4 | 1 | 0 | 0 | 1 | 0 | 16 | 1 |
| Barrow | 2022–23 | League Two | 17 | 0 | 0 | 0 | 0 | 0 | 0 | 0 | 17 | 0 |
| Barrow | 2023–24 | League Two | 44 | 0 | 2 | 0 | 1 | 0 | 2 | 0 | 49 | 0 |
| Barrow | 2024–25 | League Two | 43 | 3 | 1 | 0 | 3 | 0 | 1 | 0 | 48 | 3 |
| Career total | | | 198 | 26 | 13 | 2 | 1 | 0 | 8 | 0 | 220 | 28 |

== Honours ==
Chorley

- National League North play-offs: 2019

Stockport County

- National League: 2021–22
