= Leo Duru =

American soccer player (born 2005)

Personal information
- Full name: Leonard Chibueze Duru
- Date of birth: January 12, 2005 (age 21)
- Place of birth: Manchester, England
- Height: 5 ft 9 in (1.75 m)
- Position: Right-back

Team information
- Current team: Carlisle United

Youth career
- Manchester United
- 2015–2024: Blackburn Rovers

Senior career*
Years	Team	Apps	(Gls)
2024–2026	Blackburn Rovers	1	(0)
2025	→ Barrow (loan)	8	(1)
2025–2026	→ San Diego FC (loan)	2	(0)
2026	→ Birmingham Legion (loan)	6	(0)
2026–	Carlisle United	0	(0)

International career^{‡}
2024–	United States U20	3	(0)
- * Club domestic league appearances and goals as of 16:02, 22 October 2025 (UTC) ‡ National team caps and goals as of 14:49, October 14, 2024 (UTC)

Leonard Chibueze Duru (born January 12, 2005) is a professional soccer player who plays as a right-back for Carlisle United. Born in England, he represents the United States at youth level.

== Club career ==
Duru was part of the academy at Manchester United before joining Blackburn Rovers as a U10. On July 7, 2021, he signed a scholarship contract with Blackburn and was promoted to their U23s. He signed his first professional contract with the club for one year on May 25, 2023. On May 13, 2024, he extended his contract again until 2026 with an option for another year. He made his senior and professional debut with Blackburn in a 6–1 EFL Cup win over Stockport County on August 13, 2024.

On January 9, 2025, Duru joined League Two side Barrow on loan for the remainder of the season.

On August 20, 2025, Duru joined Major League Soccer side San Diego on loan with an option for a permanent transfer, running until December with an option to extend until June 2026. On 31 December 2025, the club announced that Duru's loan had been extended until the end of June.

On 6 March 2026, San Diego announced that the clubs had mutually agreed to terminate Duru's loan deal. Duru made two appearances for the club during the 2025 MLS regular season.

The following day, on 7 March 2026, Blackburn Rovers announced that Duru had joined Birmingham Legion of the USL Championship on loan until June 2026, the end of the 2025–26 English football season.

On 19 May, it was announced by Blackburn Rovers that Duru would be departing following the conclusion of his contract.

On 25 July 2026, Duru joined Carlisle United.

== International career ==
Born in England, Duru is eligible to play for England, Nigeria, and the United States. He is eligible for the United States via his American mother who is from Philadelphia. In October 2024, he was called up to the United States U20s for a set of friendlies.
