= List of English football transfers summer 2024 =

The 2024 English football summer transfer window ran from 14 June to 30 August 2024. Players without a club could be signed at any time, clubs could sign players on loan dependent on their league's regulations, and clubs could sign a goalkeeper on an emergency loan if they had no registered senior goalkeeper available. This list includes transfers featuring at least one club from either the Premier League or the EFL that were completed after the end of the winter 2023–24 transfer window on 1 February 2024 and before the end of the 2024 summer window.

== Transfers ==
All players and clubs without a flag are English. While Cardiff City, Swansea City, Wrexham and Newport County are affiliated with the Football Association of Wales and thus take the Welsh flag, they play in the Championship, League One and League Two respectively, and so their transfers are included here.

Date	Player	Moving from	Moving to	Fee
2 February 2024	Pablo Fornals	West Ham United	Real Betis	£6.8m
2 February 2024	Greg Sloggett	Unattached	Cheltenham Town	Free
2 February 2024	Thierry Small	Unattached	Charlton Athletic	Free
3 February 2024	Dominic Gape	Unattached	Northampton Town	Free
5 February 2024	Lucas Andersen	Unattached	Queens Park Rangers	Free
6 February 2024	Ousmane Kane	Unattached	Tranmere Rovers	Free
8 February 2024	Keiren Westwood	Unattached	Crewe Alexandra	Free
9 February 2024	Aristote Nsiala	Unattached	Burton Albion	Free
13 February 2024	Matt Crooks	Middlesbrough	Real Salt Lake	Undisclosed
13 February 2024	Liam Moore	Unattached	Northampton Town	Free
14 February 2024	Vontae Daley-Campbell	Unattached	Peterborough United	Free
19 February 2024	Dwight Gayle	Unattached	Derby County	Free
19 February 2024	Yann M'Vila	Unattached	West Bromwich Albion	Free
20 February 2024	Kevin Long	Birmingham City	Toronto	Undisclosed
22 February 2024	Jordy Hiwula	Unattached	Morecambe	Free
27 February 2024	Nathan Shepperd	Dundalk	Wycombe Wanderers	Free
28 February 2024	Maxime Biamou	Unattached	Doncaster Rovers	Free
29 February 2024	Jack Simpson	Unattached	Leyton Orient	Free
1 March 2024	Lee Evans	Unattached	Portsmouth	Free
8 March 2024	Connor Wickham	Unattached	Charlton Athletic	Free
9 March 2024	Rayhaan Tulloch	Unattached	Shrewsbury Town	Free
12 March 2024	Todd Kane	Unattached	Stockport County	Free
13 March 2024	Jack Price	Unattached	Shrewsbury Town	Free
30 April 2024	Benjamin Fredrick	Unattached	Brentford	Free
16 May 2024	Tim Akinola	Unattached	Chesterfield	Free
14 June 2024	Cameron Archer	Sheffield United	Aston Villa	Undisclosed
14 June 2024	Daniel Bennie	Perth Glory	Queens Park Rangers	Undisclosed
14 June 2024	Delano Burgzorg	Mainz 05	Middlesbrough	Undisclosed
14 June 2024	Neill Byrne	Stockport County	Bradford City	Undisclosed
14 June 2024	Álvaro Carreras	Manchester United	Benfica	£5.1m
14 June 2024	Ollie Clarke	Mansfield Town	Swindon Town	Undisclosed
14 June 2024	José Córdoba	Levski Sofia	Norwich City	Undisclosed
14 June 2024	Maxime Estève	Montpellier	Burnley	Undisclosed
14 June 2024	Jayden Fevrier	Colchester United	Stockport County	Undisclosed
14 June 2024	Lewis Freestone	Cheltenham Town	Stevenage	Undisclosed
14 June 2024	Rodrigo Gomes	Braga	Wolverhampton Wanderers	Undisclosed
14 June 2024	Luis Guilherme	Palmeiras	West Ham United	£25.5m
14 June 2024	Taylor Harwood-Bellis	Manchester City	Southampton	£20m
14 June 2024	Viktor Johansson	Rotherham United	Stoke City	Undisclosed
14 June 2024	Thilo Kehrer	West Ham United	Monaco	£9.5m
14 June 2024	Ismaël Koné	Watford	Marseille	£14.6m
14 June 2024	Conor McGrandles	Charlton Athletic	Lincoln City	Undisclosed
14 June 2024	Jay Mingi	Colchester United	Stockport County	Undisclosed
14 June 2024	Kelsey Mooney	Boston United	Accrington Stanley	Free
14 June 2024	Tom Nixon	Hull City	Doncaster Rovers	Undisclosed
14 June 2024	Jack Nolan	Accrington Stanley	Gillingham	Undisclosed
14 June 2024	Abraham Odoh	Harrogate Town	Peterborough United	Undisclosed
14 June 2024	Ibrahim Osman	Nordsjælland	Brighton & Hove Albion	£16m
14 June 2024	Dion Rankine	Chelsea	Wigan Athletic	Undisclosed
14 June 2024	Raphael	Macarthur	Coventry City	Undisclosed
14 June 2024	Chadi Riad	Real Betis	Crystal Palace	£12m
14 June 2024	Morgan Sanson	Aston Villa	Nice	Undisclosed
14 June 2024	Luis Sinisterra	Leeds United	Bournemouth	£20m
14 June 2024	Jason Sraha	Shrewsbury Town	Burton Albion	Undisclosed
14 June 2024	Wyll Stanway	Chester	Barrow	Undisclosed
14 June 2024	Cole Stockton	Burton Albion	Salford City	Undisclosed
14 June 2024	Mike Trésor	Genk	Burnley	Undisclosed
14 June 2024	Enes Ünal	Getafe	Bournemouth	£13m
14 June 2024	Jordan Wright	Lincoln City	Grimsby Town	Undisclosed
15 June 2024	Aodhan Doherty	Linfield	Blackburn Rovers	Undisclosed
17 June 2024	Chris Conn-Clarke	Altrincham	Peterborough United	Undisclosed
18 June 2024	Ryan Allsop	Hull City	Birmingham City	Undisclosed
18 June 2024	Ethan Amundsen-Day	Copenhagen	Aston Villa	Undisclosed
18 June 2024	Alex Bass	Sunderland	Notts County	Undisclosed
18 June 2024	Tommy Leigh	Accrington Stanley	Milton Keynes Dons	Undisclosed
18 June 2024	George Nevett	Rochdale	Peterborough United	Undisclosed
18 June 2024	Lasse Sørensen	Lincoln City	Huddersfield Town	Undisclosed
19 June 2024	Luis Binks	Bologna	Coventry City	Undisclosed
19 June 2024	Josh Davison	AFC Wimbledon	Tranmere Rovers	Undisclosed
19 June 2024	Josh Edwards	Dunfermline Athletic	Charlton Athletic	Undisclosed
20 June 2024	Julian Larsson	Nottingham Forest	Burton Albion	Undisclosed
20 June 2024	Cameron McJannet	Derry City	Grimsby Town	Undisclosed
20 June 2024	Jack Rudoni	Huddersfield Town	Coventry City	Undisclosed
21 June 2024	Daniel Oyegoke	Brentford	Heart of Midlothian	Undisclosed
21 June 2024	Marko Stamenić	Red Star Belgrade	Nottingham Forest	Undisclosed
21 June 2024	Jayden Stockley	Fleetwood Town	Port Vale	Undisclosed
21 June 2024	Yan Valery	Angers	Sheffield Wednesday	Undisclosed
21 June 2024	Charlie Webster	Chelsea	Burton Albion	Undisclosed
22 June 2024	Tim Iroegbunam	Aston Villa	Everton	£9m
22 June 2024	Nathan Trott	West Ham United	Copenhagen	Undisclosed
23 June 2024	Lewis Dobbin	Everton	Aston Villa	Undisclosed
24 June 2024	Alex Bannon	Queen's Park	Burton Albion	Undisclosed
24 June 2024	Charlie Barker	Wealdstone	Crawley Town	Undisclosed
24 June 2024	Isaac Hutchinson	Walsall	Bristol Rovers	Undisclosed
24 June 2024	Peter Kioso	Rotherham United	Oxford United	Undisclosed
24 June 2024	Rod McDonald	Harrogate Town	Notts County	Undisclosed
24 June 2024	Alex Mitchell	Millwall	Charlton Athletic	Undisclosed
24 June 2024	Romain Perraud	Southampton	Real Betis	Undisclosed
25 June 2024	Eric da Silva Moreira	FC St. Pauli	Nottingham Forest	Undisclosed
25 June 2024	Udoka Godwin-Malife	Swindon Town	Burton Albion	Undisclosed
26 June 2024	Eric Bocat	Sint-Truidense	Stoke City	Undisclosed
26 June 2024	Danilo Orsi	Crawley Town	Burton Albion	Undisclosed
26 June 2024	Ruel Sotiriou	Leyton Orient	Bristol Rovers	Undisclosed
26 June 2024	Reuben Swann	AFC Sudbury	Portsmouth	Undisclosed
27 June 2024	Corey Addai	Crawley Town	Stockport County	Undisclosed
27 June 2024	Zac Ashworth	West Bromwich Albion	Blackpool	Undisclosed
27 June 2024	Hayden Coulson	Middlesbrough	Blackpool	Undisclosed
27 June 2024	Jamie Cumming	Chelsea	Oxford United	Undisclosed
27 June 2024	Dan Ellison	Chippenham Town	Bristol Rovers	Undisclosed
27 June 2024	Ryan Giles	Luton Town	Hull City	Undisclosed
27 June 2024	Jack Lankester	Cambridge United	Crewe Alexandra	Undisclosed
27 June 2024	Ozan Tufan	Hull City	Trabzonspor	Undisclosed
28 June 2024	Bryant Bilongo	Middlesbrough	Bristol Rovers	Undisclosed
28 June 2024	Ben Godfrey	Everton	Atalanta	£10m
28 June 2024	Ben Goodliffe	Sutton United	Colchester United	Undisclosed
28 June 2024	Klaidi Lolos	Crawley Town	Bolton Wanderers	Undisclosed
28 June 2024	Ian Maatsen	Chelsea	Aston Villa	£35m
28 June 2024	Scott Malone	Gillingham	Crawley Town	Undisclosed
28 June 2024	Aidan Morris	Columbus Crew	Middlesbrough	£3.1m
28 June 2024	Marc Roca	Leeds United	Real Betis	Undisclosed
28 June 2024	Lorent Tolaj	Aldershot Town	Port Vale	Undisclosed
28 June 2024	Hakim Ziyech	Chelsea	(Turkey) Galatasaray	£2.5m
29 June 2024	Omari Kellyman	Aston Villa	Chelsea	£19m
29 June 2024	Joel Senior	Morecambe	Bristol Rovers	Undisclosed
30 June 2024	Saïd Benrahma	West Ham United	Lyon	Undisclosed
30 June 2024	Omari Hutchinson	Chelsea	Ipswich Town	£20m
30 June 2024	Douglas Luiz	Aston Villa	Juventus	£42.4m
30 June 2024	Taylor Moore	Unattached	Bristol Rovers	Free
30 June 2024	Bailey Peacock-Farrell	Burnley	Birmingham City	Undisclosed
1 July 2024	Tosin Adarabioyo	Fulham	Chelsea	Free
1 July 2024	Ben Amos	Wigan Athletic	Port Vale	Free
1 July 2024	Joseph Anang	West Ham United	St Patrick's Athletic	Free
1 July 2024	Elliot Anderson	Newcastle United	Nottingham Forest	Undisclosed
1 July 2024	Harry Anderson	Stevenage	Colchester United	Free
1 July 2024	Louis Appéré	Northampton Town	Stevenage	Free
1 July 2024	Jordan Archer	Queens Park Rangers	Portsmouth	Free
1 July 2024	Luke Ayling	Leeds United	Middlesbrough	Free
1 July 2024	Keanu Baccus	St Mirren	Mansfield Town	Free
1 July 2024	Geraldo Bajrami	Notts County	Burton Albion	Free
1 July 2024	Matt Baker	Stoke City	Newport County	Undisclosed
1 July 2024	Tyreeq Bakinson	Sheffield Wednesday	Wycombe Wanderers	Free
1 July 2024	Ross Barkley	Luton Town	Aston Villa	Undisclosed
1 July 2024	George Baldock	Sheffield United	Panathinaikos	Free
1 July 2024	Aden Baldwin	Notts County	Bradford City	Free
1 July 2024	Kofi Balmer	Crystal Palace	Motherwell	Free
1 July 2024	Sam Barnes	Blackburn Rovers	Barrow	Undisclosed
1 July 2024	Enzo Barrenechea	Juventus	Aston Villa	£6.8m
1 July 2024	Connor Barrett	AFC Fylde	Walsall	Undisclosed
1 July 2024	Jaiden Bartolo	Wealdstone	Wycombe Wanderers	Free
1 July 2024	Lewis Bate	Leeds United	Stockport County	Free
1 July 2024	Tom Bayliss	Shrewsbury Town	Lincoln City	Free
1 July 2024	Jacob Bedeau	Morecambe	Notts County	Free
1 July 2024	Scot Bennett	Newport County	Cheltenham Town	Free
1 July 2024	Lucas Bergvall	Djurgården	Tottenham Hotspur	£8.5m
1 July 2024	Luke Berry	Luton Town	Charlton Athletic	Free
1 July 2024	Harrison Biggins	Doncaster Rovers	Shrewsbury Town	Free
1 July 2024	Corey Blackett-Taylor	Charlton Athletic	Derby County	Free
1 July 2024	Frazer Blake-Tracy	Swindon Town	Mansfield Town	Free
1 July 2024	Bendegúz Bolla	Wolverhampton Wanderers	Rapid Vienna	Free
1 July 2024	Ciaran Brennan	Sheffield Wednesday	Newport County	Free
1 July 2024	Rumarn Burrell	Cove Rangers	Burton Albion	Free
1 July 2024	Jacob Carney	Castellón	Newport County	Free
1 July 2024	Matthew Carson	Reading	Grimsby Town	Free
1 July 2024	Daniel Chesters	West Ham United	Salford City	Free
1 July 2024	Cătălin Cîrjan	Arsenal	Dinamo București	Free
1 July 2024	Jonson Clarke-Harris	Peterborough United	Rotherham United	Free
1 July 2024	Robbie Cleary	Unattached	Salford City	Free
1 July 2024	Harry Clifton	Grimsby Town	Doncaster Rovers	Free
1 July 2024	Callum Connolly	Blackpool	Stockport County	Free
1 July 2024	Ryan Croasdale	Stockport County	Port Vale	Free
1 July 2024	Ronan Curtis	AFC Wimbledon	Port Vale	Free
1 July 2024	Cameron Dawson	Sheffield Wednesday	Rotherham United	Free
1 July 2024	Ryan Delaney	Newport County	Swindon Town	Free
1 July 2024	Oliver Denham	Cardiff City	Sligo Rovers	Free
1 July 2024	Ousmane Diakité	TSV Hartberg	West Bromwich Albion	Free
1 July 2024	Jack Diamond	Sunderland	Stockport County	Free
1 July 2024	Eric Dier	Tottenham Hotspur	Bayern Munich	Free
1 July 2024	Mamadou Doumbia	Black Stars	Watford	Undisclosed
1 July 2024	Tommy Doyle	Manchester City	Wolverhampton Wanderers	£4.3m
1 July 2024	Kane Drummond	Macclesfield	Chesterfield	Free
1 July 2024	Stephen Duke-McKenna	Queens Park Rangers	Harrogate Town	Free
1 July 2024	Chey Dunkley	Shrewsbury Town	Chesterfield	Free
1 July 2024	Curtis Edwards	Woking	Notts County	Free
1 July 2024	Will Ferry	Cheltenham Town	Dundee United	Free
1 July 2024	Sam Finley	Bristol Rovers	Tranmere Rovers	Free
1 July 2024	Ashley Fletcher	Watford	Blackpool	Free
1 July 2024	Josh Flint	Volendam	Crawley Town	Free
1 July 2024	Wes Foderingham	Sheffield United	West Ham United	Free
1 July 2024	Chris Forino-Joseph	Wycombe Wanderers	Bolton Wanderers	Free
1 July 2024	Omari Forson	Manchester United	Monza	Free
1 July 2024	James Gibbons	Bristol Rovers	Cambridge United	Free
1 July 2024	Ben Gibson	Norwich City	Stoke City	Free
1 July 2024	Jordan Gibson	Carlisle United	Doncaster Rovers	Free
1 July 2024	John-Kymani Gordon	Crystal Palace	Colchester United	Free
1 July 2024	Josh Gordon	Burton Albion	Walsall	Free
1 July 2024	Lewis Gordon	Bristol Rovers	Chesterfield	Free
1 July 2024	Oliver Greaves	Mickleover	Newport County	Free
1 July 2024	Lee Gregory	Sheffield Wednesday	Mansfield Town	Free
1 July 2024	Marc Guiu	Barcelona	Chelsea	£5m
1 July 2024	Jay Haddow	Blackburn Rovers	Kitchee	Free
1 July 2024	Connor Hall	Colchester United	Port Vale	Undisclosed
1 July 2024	Lewis Hall	Chelsea	Newcastle United	£28m
1 July 2024	Ben Hamer	Watford	Sheffield Wednesday	Free
1 July 2024	Cameron Harper	Inverness Caledonian Thistle	Carlisle United	Free
1 July 2024	Sam Hart	Sutton United	Port Vale	Free
1 July 2024	Alex Hartridge	Exeter City	Wycombe Wanderers	Free
1 July 2024	Aaron Hayden	Wrexham	Carlisle United	Free
1 July 2024	Ryan Haynes	Northampton Town	Cheltenham Town	Free
1 July 2024	Kane Hemmings	Stevenage	Crewe Alexandra	Free
1 July 2024	Rushian Hepburn-Murphy	Swindon Town	Crawley Town	Free
1 July 2024	Myles Hippolyte	Stockport County	AFC Wimbledon	Free
1 July 2024	Conor Hourihane	Derby County	Barnsley	Free
1 July 2024	Sam Hughes	Burton Albion	Stockport County	Free
1 July 2024	Rob Hunt	Leyton Orient	Colchester United	Free
1 July 2024	Samuel Iling-Junior	Juventus	Aston Villa	£11.9m
1 July 2024	Svante Ingelsson	Hansa Rostock	Sheffield Wednesday	Free
1 July 2024	Reece James	Sheffield Wednesday	Rotherham United	Free
1 July 2024	Ben Johnson	West Ham United	Ipswich Town	Free
1 July 2024	Callum Johnson	Mansfield Town	Bradford City	Free
1 July 2024	Arkell Jude-Boyd	Queens Park Rangers	Cheltenham Town	Free
1 July 2024	Zak Jules	Exeter City	Rotherham United	Free
1 July 2024	Tomas Kalinauskas	Den Bosch	Burton Albion	Free
1 July 2024	Daichi Kamada	Lazio	Crystal Palace	Free
1 July 2024	David Kamara	Welling United	Peterborough United	Free
1 July 2024	Liam Kelly	Coventry City	Rotherham United	Free
1 July 2024	Lloyd Kelly	Bournemouth	Newcastle United	Free
1 July 2024	Michael Kelly	Milton Keynes Dons	Accrington Stanley	Free
1 July 2024	Dan Kemp	Milton Keynes Dons	Stevenage	Free
1 July 2024	Omar Khedr	ZED	Aston Villa	Undisclosed
1 July 2024	Josh Knight	Peterborough United	Hannover 96	Free
1 July 2024	Jacob Knightbridge	West Ham United	Oxford United	Free
1 July 2024	Jimmy Knowles	Boston United	Accrington Stanley	Undisclosed
1 July 2024	Robin Koch	Leeds United	Eintracht Frankfurt	Free
1 July 2024	Katia Kouyate	Everton	Barrow	Free
1 July 2024	Charlie Lakin	Burton Albion	Walsall	Free
1 July 2024	Adam Lallana	Brighton & Hove Albion	Southampton	Free
1 July 2024	Shayne Lavery	Blackpool	Cambridge United	Free
1 July 2024	Connor Lemonheigh-Evans	Stockport County	Milton Keynes Dons	Free
1 July 2024	Armani Little	AFC Wimbledon	Gillingham	Free
1 July 2024	George Lloyd	Cheltenham Town	Shrewsbury Town	Free
1 July 2024	Andy Lonergan	Everton	Wigan Athletic	Free
1 July 2024	Sean Long	Cheltenham Town	Forest Green Rovers	Free
1 July 2024	Rosaire Longelo	Accrington Stanley	Swindon Town	Free
1 July 2024	Jamal Lowe	Bournemouth	Sheffield Wednesday	Free
1 July 2024	Max Lowe	Sheffield United	Sheffield Wednesday	Free
1 July 2024	Alex MacDonald	Stevenage	Rotherham United	Free
1 July 2024	Matt Macey	Portsmouth	Colchester United	Free
1 July 2024	Paddy Madden	Stockport County	Chesterfield	Free
1 July 2024	Josh Magennis	Wigan Athletic	Exeter City	Free
1 July 2024	Laurence Maguire	Chesterfield	Milton Keynes Dons	Free
1 July 2024	Connor Mahoney	Huddersfield Town	Barrow	Free
1 July 2024	Will Mannion	Cambridge United	Charlton Athletic	Free
1 July 2024	Jack Matton	Woking	Wycombe Wanderers	Free
1 July 2024	Callum Maycock	Solihull Moors	AFC Wimbledon	Free
1 July 2024	Fally Mayulu	Rapid Vienna	Bristol City	Undisclosed
1 July 2024	Jon McCracken	Norwich City	Dundee	Free
1 July 2024	JJ McKiernan	Morecambe	Lincoln City	Free
1 July 2024	Jack McMillan	Partick Thistle	Exeter City	Free
1 July 2024	Shaun McWilliams	Northampton Town	Rotherham United	Free
1 July 2024	Mickel Miller	Plymouth Argyle	Huddersfield Town	Free
1 July 2024	Yankuba Minteh	Newcastle United	Brighton & Hove Albion	£30m
1 July 2024	Clinton Mola	Reading	Bristol Rovers	Free
1 July 2024	Simon Moore	Coventry City	Sunderland	Free
1 July 2024	Josh Murphy	Oxford United	Portsmouth	Free
1 July 2024	Paul Nardi	Gent	Queens Park Rangers	Free
1 July 2024	Elliott Nevitt	Crewe Alexandra	Gillingham	Free
1 July 2024	Cameron Norman	Milton Keynes Dons	Tranmere Rovers	Free
1 July 2024	Aristote Nsiala	Burton Albion	Shrewsbury Town	Free
1 July 2024	Luke Offord	Crewe Alexandra	Milton Keynes Dons	Free
1 July 2024	Nathanael Ogbeta	Swansea City	Plymouth Argyle	Free
1 July 2024	Arthur Okonkwo	Arsenal	Wrexham	Free
1 July 2024	Ben Osborn	Sheffield United	Derby County	Free
1 July 2024	Deji Oshilaja	Burton Albion	Mansfield Town	Free
1 July 2024	John-Joe O'Toole	Mansfield Town	AFC Wimbledon	Free
1 July 2024	Antony Papadopoulos	Welling United	Crawley Town	Free
1 July 2024	Jamie Pardington	Cheltenham Town	Lincoln City	Free
1 July 2024	Alex Paulsen	Wellington Phoenix	Bournemouth	Undisclosed
1 July 2024	Harry Pell	AFC Wimbledon	Cheltenham Town	Free
1 July 2024	Ivan Perišić	Tottenham Hotspur	Hajduk Split	Free
1 July 2024	Matthew Platt	Bradford City	Notts County	Free
1 July 2024	Joe Powell	Burton Albion	Rotherham United	Free
1 July 2024	Joe Pritchard	Accrington Stanley	Milton Keynes Dons	Free
1 July 2024	Joe Rafferty	Portsmouth	Rotherham United	Free
1 July 2024	Sean Raggett	Portsmouth	Rotherham United	Free
1 July 2024	Jordan Rhodes	Huddersfield Town	Blackpool	Free
1 July 2024	Ethan Robson	Milton Keynes Dons	Carlisle United	Free
1 July 2024	Aaron Rowe	Huddersfield Town	Gillingham	Free
1 July 2024	John Ruddy	Birmingham City	Newcastle United	Free
1 July 2024	Shurandy Sambo	PSV Eindhoven	Burnley	Free
1 July 2024	Antoni Sarcevic	Stockport County	Bradford City	Free
1 July 2024	Toby Savin	Accrington Stanley	Shrewsbury Town	Free
1 July 2024	Joe Sbarra	Solihull Moors	Doncaster Rovers	Free
1 July 2024	Liam Sercombe	Cheltenham Town	Forest Green Rovers	Free
1 July 2024	Billy Sharp	Hull City	Doncaster Rovers	Free
1 July 2024	Sam Sherring	Northampton Town	Milton Keynes Dons	Free
1 July 2024	Thiago Silva	Chelsea	Fluminense	Free
1 July 2024	Jude Smith	Newcastle United	Carlisle United	Free
1 July 2024	Tunmise Sobowale	Shrewsbury Town	Swindon Town	Free
1 July 2024	Sol Solomon	Marine	Tranmere Rovers	Free
1 July 2024	Luke Southwood	Cheltenham Town	Bolton Wanderers	Free
1 July 2024	Omar Sowunmi	Sutton United	Bromley	Undisclosed
1 July 2024	Dylan Stephenson	Newcastle United	Dagenham & Redbridge	Free
1 July 2024	Matty Stevens	Forest Green Rovers	AFC Wimbledon	Free
1 July 2024	Charlie Taylor	Burnley	Southampton	Free
1 July 2024	Igor Thiago	Club Brugge	Brentford	£30m
1 July 2024	Joe Thomas	Swansea City	Newport County	Free
1 July 2024	Terell Thomas	Charlton Athletic	Carlisle United	Free
1 July 2024	Adama Traoré	Hull City	Amedspor	Free
1 July 2024	Nick Tsaroulla	Crawley Town	Notts County	Free
1 July 2024	Christos Tzolis	Norwich City	Fortuna Düsseldorf	Undisclosed
1 July 2024	Will Vaulks	Sheffield Wednesday	Oxford United	Free
1 July 2024	Matty Virtue	Blackpool	Fleetwood Town	Free
1 July 2024	Odysseas Vlachodimos	Nottingham Forest	Newcastle United	Undisclosed
1 July 2024	Tyler Walton	Southport	Accrington Stanley	Free
1 July 2024	Tyrell Warren	Barrow	Grimsby Town	Free
1 July 2024	Angel Waruih	Brentford	Eastleigh	Free
1 July 2024	Elliot Watt	Salford City	Burton Albion	Free
1 July 2024	Kelland Watts	Newcastle United	Cambridge United	Free
1 July 2024	Ben Whitfield	Barrow	Burton Albion	Free
1 July 2024	Kai Whitmore	Haverfordwest County	Newport County	Free
1 July 2024	Jordan Williams	Barnsley	Portsmouth	Free
1 July 2024	Will Wright	Crawley Town	Swindon Town	Free
1 July 2024	Charlie Wyke	Wigan Athletic	Carlisle United	Free
1 July 2024	Luke Young	Wrexham	Cheltenham Town	Free
2 July 2024	Brandon Aguilera	Nottingham Forest	Rio Ave	Undisclosed
2 July 2024	Jay Bird	Arbroath	Exeter City	Free
2 July 2024	Lewis Brunt	Leicester City	Wrexham	Undisclosed
2 July 2024	Kiernan Dewsbury-Hall	Leicester City	Chelsea	£30m
2 July 2024	Lewis Fiorini	Manchester City	Stockport County	Undisclosed
2 July 2024	Archie Gray	Leeds United	Tottenham Hotspur	£40m
2 July 2024	Kayden Jackson	Ipswich Town	Derby County	Free
2 July 2024	Herbie Kane	Barnsley	Huddersfield Town	Free
2 July 2024	Lewis Leigh	Preston North End	Bromley	Undisclosed
2 July 2024	Pedro Lima	Sport Recife	Wolverhampton Wanderers	Undisclosed
2 July 2024	Orel Mangala	Nottingham Forest	Lyon	£15m
2 July 2024	Alfie May	Charlton Athletic	Birmingham City	Undisclosed
2 July 2024	Zech Medley	KV Oostende	Fleetwood Town	Free
2 July 2024	Jack Payne	Charlton Athletic	Colchester United	Free
2 July 2024	Farrend Rawson	Morecambe	Accrington Stanley	Free
2 July 2024	Joe Rodon	Tottenham Hotspur	Leeds United	£10m
2 July 2024	Michael Spellman	Sunderland	Newport County	Free
2 July 2024	Rob Street	Cheltenham Town	Lincoln City	Free
2 July 2024	Lyle Taylor	Cambridge United	Colchester United	Free
2 July 2024	James Wilson	Port Vale	Northampton Town	Free
2 July 2024	Ryan Woods	Hull City	Exeter City	Free
3 July 2024	Rio Adebisi	Crewe Alexandra	Peterborough United	Undisclosed
3 July 2024	Jonathan Bond	Unattached	Watford	Free
3 July 2024	Joe Day	Newport County	Cheltenham Town	Free
3 July 2024	Ronnie Edwards	Peterborough United	Southampton	£3m
3 July 2024	Owen Evans	Walsall	Cheltenham Town	Free
3 July 2024	Matt Godden	Coventry City	Charlton Athletic	Undisclosed
3 July 2024	Daniel Harvie	Milton Keynes Dons	Wycombe Wanderers	Undisclosed
3 July 2024	Cian Hayes	Fleetwood Town	Peterborough United	Undisclosed
3 July 2024	Zach Jeacock	Birmingham City	Lincoln City	Free
3 July 2024	Olaf Kobacki	Arka Gdynia	Sheffield Wednesday	Undisclosed
3 July 2024	Sam Long	Lincoln City	Bromley	Undisclosed
3 July 2024	Iliman Ndiaye	Marseille	Everton	£15m
3 July 2024	Marc Roberts	Birmingham City	Barnsley	Free
3 July 2024	Louie Sibley	Derby County	Oxford United	Free
3 July 2024	Max Sanders	Leyton Orient	Crewe Alexandra	Undisclosed
3 July 2024	Nik Tzanev	AFC Wimbledon	Northampton Town	Free
3 July 2024	Daniel Udoh	Shrewsbury Town	Wycombe Wanderers	Free
3 July 2024	Leopold Wahlstedt	Blackburn Rovers	AGF	Undisclosed
4 July 2024	Gassan Ahadme	Ipswich Town	Charlton Athletic	Undisclosed
4 July 2024	Scott Banks	Crystal Palace	FC St. Pauli	Undisclosed
4 July 2024	James Bolton	St Mirren	Fleetwood Town	Undisclosed
4 July 2024	Chinoso Chibueze	Chelsea	Stoke City	Undisclosed
4 July 2024	Marcus Dinanga	Gateshead	Bromley	Undisclosed
4 July 2024	Liam Dulson	Bedford Town	Cheltenham Town	Free
4 July 2024	Antony Evans	Bristol Rovers	Huddersfield Town	Undisclosed
4 July 2024	Edward Francis	Gateshead	Exeter City	Undisclosed
4 July 2024	Torbjørn Heggem	Brommapojkarna	West Bromwich Albion	Undisclosed
4 July 2024	Mackenzie Hunt	Everton	Fleetwood Town	Free
4 July 2024	Ethan Ingram	West Bromwich Albion	Dundee	Free
4 July 2024	Diallang Jaiyesimi	Charlton Athletic	Leyton Orient	Undisclosed
4 July 2024	Liam Kelly	Crawley Town	Milton Keynes Dons	Undisclosed
4 July 2024	George McEachran	Swindon Town	Grimsby Town	Free
4 July 2024	Moussa Niakhaté	Nottingham Forest	Lyon	Undisclosed
4 July 2024	David Okagbue	Stoke City	Walsall	Undisclosed
4 July 2024	Daniel Phillips	St Johnstone	Stevenage	Free
4 July 2024	David Raya	Brentford	Arsenal	£27m
4 July 2024	Jamie Shackleton	Leeds United	Sheffield United	Free
4 July 2024	Alex Woodyard	York City	Colchester United	Free
4 July 2024	Tyreik Wright	Plymouth Argyle	Bradford City	Undisclosed
5 July 2024	Ethon Archer	Torquay United	Cheltenham Town	Free
5 July 2024	Omar Bogle	Newport County	Crewe Alexandra	Free
5 July 2024	Tom Carroll	Exeter City	Milton Keynes Dons	Free
5 July 2024	Jack Currie	AFC Wimbledon	Oxford United	Undisclosed
5 July 2024	Tendayi Darikwa	Apollon Limassol	Lincoln City	Free
5 July 2024	Greg Docherty	Hull City	Charlton Athletic	Free
5 July 2024	George Feeney	Glentoran	Tottenham Hotspur	Undisclosed
5 July 2024	Emil Hansson	Heracles	Birmingham City	Undisclosed
5 July 2024	Lyanco	Southampton	Atlético Mineiro	Undisclosed
5 July 2024	Cameron McGeehan	Colchester United	Northampton Town	Free
5 July 2024	Liam Morrison	Bayern Munich	Queens Park Rangers	Undisclosed
5 July 2024	Hevertton Santos	Estrela	Queens Park Rangers	Free
5 July 2024	Fynn Talley	Peterborough United	Kitchee	Free
5 July 2024	Rocco Vata	Celtic	Watford	Undisclosed
5 July 2024	Mats Wieffer	Feyenoord	Brighton & Hove Albion	£25.4m
5 July 2024	Nathan Wood	Swansea City	Southampton	£3m
6 July 2024	Shandon Baptiste	Brentford	Luton Town	Free
6 July 2024	Bobby De Cordova-Reid	Fulham	Leicester City	Free
6 July 2024	George Dobson	Charlton Athletic	Wrexham	Free
6 July 2024	Max Kilman	Wolverhampton Wanderers	West Ham United	£40m
7 July 2024	Amario Cozier-Duberry	Arsenal	Brighton & Hove Albion	Free
7 July 2024	Michael Golding	Chelsea	Leicester City	£4m
7 July 2024	Kristoffer Klaesson	Leeds United	Raków Częstochowa	Free
7 July 2024	Michael Olise	Crystal Palace	Bayern Munich	£60m
8 July 2024	Jack Armer	Carlisle United	Burton Albion	Undisclosed
8 July 2024	Zico Asare	Maidenhead United	Harrogate Town	Free
8 July 2024	Mika Biereth	Arsenal	Sturm Graz	Undisclosed
8 July 2024	Billy Bodin	Oxford United	Burton Albion	Free
8 July 2024	Alex Cairns	Salford City	Leeds United	Free
8 July 2024	Duje Ćaleta-Car	Southampton	Lyon	Undisclosed
8 July 2024	Charlie Cresswell	Leeds United	Toulouse	Undisclosed
8 July 2024	Lee Evans	Portsmouth	Blackpool	Free
8 July 2024	Joe Gubbins	Queens Park Rangers	Southend United	Free
8 July 2024	Macaulay Langstaff	Notts County	Millwall	Undisclosed
9 July 2024	Jack Baldwin	Ross County	Northampton Town	Undisclosed
9 July 2024	George Byers	Sheffield Wednesday	Port Vale	Free
9 July 2024	Lewis Cass	Port Vale	Grimsby Town	Free
9 July 2024	Archie Davies	Dundalk	Carlisle United	Undisclosed
9 July 2024	Idris El Mizouni	Ipswich Town	Oxford United	£400,000
9 July 2024	Gavan Holohan	Grimsby Town	Crawley Town	Free
9 July 2024	Diego Llorente	Leeds United	Real Betis	£2.5m
9 July 2024	Carlos Miguel	Corinthians	Nottingham Forest	£3.4m
9 July 2024	Toby Mullarkey	Grimsby Town	Crawley Town	Undisclosed
9 July 2024	Caleb Okoli	Atalanta	Leicester City	Undisclosed
9 July 2024	Stefán Teitur Þórðarson	Silkeborg	Preston North End	Undisclosed
9 July 2024	Jackson Smith	Walsall	Barnsley	Undisclosed
9 July 2024	Thomas Strakosha	Brentford	AEK Athens	Free
9 July 2024	Jason Daði Svanþórsson	Breiðablik	Grimsby Town	Undisclosed
10 July 2024	Cameron Antwi	Cardiff City	Newport County	Free
10 July 2024	Courtney Baker-Richardson	Crewe Alexandra	Newport County	Free
10 July 2024	Kenzo Goudmijn	AZ	Derby County	Undisclosed
10 July 2024	Grant Hall	Rotherham United	Swindon Town	Free
10 July 2024	Daniel Jebbison	Sheffield United	Bournemouth	£1.5m
10 July 2024	Ryan Loft	Port Vale	Cambridge United	Undisclosed
10 July 2024	Charlie McNeill	Manchester United	Sheffield Wednesday	Free
10 July 2024	Dylan Mitchell	Aston Villa	Swindon Town	Free
10 July 2024	Moussa Sissoko	Nantes	Watford	Free
10 July 2024	Japhet Tanganga	Tottenham Hotspur	Millwall	Free
10 July 2024	Semir Telalović	Blackburn Rovers	Ulm 1846	Undisclosed
10 July 2024	Lewis Ward	Charlton Athletic	AFC Wimbledon	Free
10 July 2024	Joe Wildsmith	Derby County	West Bromwich Albion	Free
11 July 2024	Alan Browne	Preston North End	Sunderland	Free
11 July 2024	Lukas Jensen	Lincoln City	Millwall	Undisclosed
11 July 2024	Sam McCallum	Norwich City	Sheffield United	Free
11 July 2024	Gabriel Osho	Luton Town	Auxerre	Free
11 July 2024	João Palhinha	Fulham	Bayern Munich	£42.3m
11 July 2024	Donny van de Beek	Manchester United	Girona	£420,600
11 July 2024	Reuell Walters	Arsenal	Luton Town	Free
12 July 2024	Scott Arfield	Charlotte	Bolton Wanderers	Free
12 July 2024	Harry Burgoyne	Shrewsbury Town	Morecambe	Free
12 July 2024	Max Dean	Milton Keynes Dons	Gent	£2m
12 July 2024	Tom Eaves	Rotherham United	Northampton Town	Undisclosed
12 July 2024	Taylor Foran	Arsenal	Bromley	Free
12 July 2024	Gonçalo Franco	Moreirense	Swansea City	Undisclosed
12 July 2024	Sergio Gómez	Manchester City	Real Sociedad	£8.4m
12 July 2024	Kellan Gordon	Crawley Town	Notts County	Free
12 July 2024	Jacob Greaves	Hull City	Ipswich Town	Undisclosed
12 July 2024	Jack Hazlehurst	Chorley	Burton Albion	Undisclosed
12 July 2024	Luke Hendrie	Bradford City	Morecambe	Free
12 July 2024	Callum Hendry	Salford City	Milton Keynes Dons	Undisclosed
12 July 2024	Hallam Hope	Oldham Athletic	Morecambe	Free
12 July 2024	Adam Lewis	Liverpool	Morecambe	Free
12 July 2024	Paul Lewis	Tranmere Rovers	Morecambe	Free
12 July 2024	Jamie Lindsay	Rotherham United	Bristol Rovers	Free
12 July 2024	Alfie McCalmont	Carlisle United	Central Coast Mariners	Undisclosed
12 July 2024	Ross Millen	Raith Rovers	Morecambe	Free
12 July 2024	George Ray	Barrow	Morecambe	Free
12 July 2024	Jamie Stott	FC Halifax Town	Morecambe	Free
12 July 2024	Max Taylor	Rochdale	Morecambe	Free
12 July 2024	Ben Tollitt	Oldham Athletic	Morecambe	Free
12 July 2024	Renato Veiga	Basel	Chelsea	£12m
12 July 2024	Tom White	Barrow	Morecambe	Free
12 July 2024	Chris Willock	Queens Park Rangers	Cardiff City	Undisclosed
12 July 2024	Malick Yalcouyé	Göteborg	Brighton & Hove Albion	£6m
13 July 2024	Nathaniel Chalobah	West Bromwich Albion	Sheffield Wednesday	Free
13 July 2024	Liam Delap	Manchester City	Ipswich Town	£20m
13 July 2024	Tom Edwards	Stoke City	Salford City	Free
13 July 2024	Troy Parrott	Tottenham Hotspur	AZ	Undisclosed
14 July 2024	Calum Chambers	Aston Villa	Cardiff City	Free
14 July 2024	Yukinari Sugawara	AZ	Southampton	£6m
14 July 2024	Theo Vassell	Salford City	Barrow	Free
14 July 2024	Joshua Zirkzee	Bologna	Manchester United	£36.5m
15 July 2024	Callum Burton	Plymouth Argyle	Wrexham	Free
15 July 2024	Eom Ji-sung	Gwangju	Swansea City	Undisclosed
15 July 2024	Willy Kambwala	Manchester United	Villarreal	Undisclosed
15 July 2024	Kieffer Moore	Bournemouth	Sheffield United	Undisclosed
15 July 2024	Callum O'Hare	Coventry City	Sheffield United	Free
15 July 2024	Ruari Paton	Queen's Park	Port Vale	Undisclosed
15 July 2024	Przemysław Płacheta	Swansea City	Oxford United	Free
15 July 2024	Sebastian Revan	Aston Villa	Wrexham	Undisclosed
16 July 2024	Will Aimson	Exeter City	Wigan Athletic	Undisclosed
16 July 2024	Jack Barrett	Everton	Blackburn Rovers	Free
16 July 2024	Alex Cochrane	Heart of Midlothian	Birmingham City	Undisclosed
16 July 2024	Jack Cooper Love	Elfsborg	Burton Albion	Undisclosed
16 July 2024	Dawson Devoy	Milton Keynes Dons	Bohemians	Undisclosed
16 July 2024	Flynn Downes	West Ham United	Southampton	Undisclosed
16 July 2024	Abdul Fatawu	Sporting CP	Leicester City	Undisclosed
16 July 2024	Gary Gardner	Birmingham City	Cambridge United	Free
16 July 2024	Luca Hoole	Bristol Rovers	Shrewsbury Town	Undisclosed
16 July 2024	Alex Iacovitti	Port Vale	St Mirren	Undisclosed
16 July 2024	Glen Kamara	Leeds United	Rennes	£8.4m
16 July 2024	Lucas Pires	Santos	Burnley	Undisclosed
16 July 2024	Viljami Sinisalo	Aston Villa	Celtic	£1m
16 July 2024	Ellis Taylor	Sunderland	Harrogate Town	Free
16 July 2024	Lewis Warrington	Everton	Leyton Orient	Free
17 July 2024	Ebou Adams	Cardiff City	Derby County	Undisclosed
17 July 2024	James Chester	Barrow	Salford City	Free
17 July 2024	Andréas Hountondji	Caen	Burnley	Undisclosed
17 July 2024	Arijanet Muric	Burnley	Ipswich Town	£15m
17 July 2024	Korey Smith	Derby County	Cambridge United	Free
18 July 2024	Mason Greenwood	Manchester United	Marseille	£26.6m
18 July 2024	Dom Jefferies	Gillingham	Lincoln City	Undisclosed
18 July 2024	Jamie Jones	Middlesbrough	Salford City	Free
18 July 2024	Harvey Macadam	Fleetwood Town	Morecambe	Free
18 July 2024	Nikola Milenković	Fiorentina	Nottingham Forest	£12m
18 July 2024	Sávio	Troyes	Manchester City	£30.8m
18 July 2024	Harrison Sohna	Unattached	Cheltenham Town	Free
18 July 2024	Jojo Wollacott	Hibernian	Crawley Town	Undisclosed
18 July 2024	Leny Yoro	Lille	Manchester United	£52m
19 July 2024	Sinclair Armstrong	Queens Park Rangers	Bristol City	Undisclosed
19 July 2024	Žan Celar	Lugano	Queens Park Rangers	Undisclosed
19 July 2024	Oliver Dovin	Hammarby	Coventry City	Undisclosed
19 July 2024	Tyrese Francois	Fulham	Wigan Athletic	Free
19 July 2024	Tom Hamer	Burton Albion	Lincoln City	Undisclosed
19 July 2024	Václav Hladký	Ipswich Town	Burnley	Free
19 July 2024	Matt Ingram	Hull City	Oxford United	Undisclosed
19 July 2024	John Marquis	Bristol Rovers	Shrewsbury Town	Free
19 July 2024	Promise Omochere	Fleetwood Town	Bristol Rovers	Undisclosed
19 July 2024	Jaden Philogene	Hull City	Aston Villa	£13.5m
19 July 2024	Willum Þór Willumsson	Go Ahead Eagles	Birmingham City	Undisclosed
20 July 2024	Jayden Bogle	Sheffield United	Leeds United	Undisclosed
20 July 2024	Christoph Klarer	SV Darmstadt 98	Birmingham City	Undisclosed
20 July 2024	Miodrag Pivaš	Jedinstvo	Newcastle United	Undisclosed
20 July 2024	Jon Taylor	Doncaster Rovers	Salford City	Free
20 July 2024	George Wickens	Fulham	Lincoln City	Undisclosed
21 July 2024	Sean Clare	Wigan Athletic	Leyton Orient	Undisclosed
21 July 2024	Tommy Setford	Ajax	Arsenal	Undisclosed
22 July 2024	Muhammadu Faal	Havant & Waterlooville	Crawley Town	Free
22 July 2024	Amadou Onana	Everton	Aston Villa	£50m
22 July 2024	Liam Roberts	Middlesbrough	Millwall	Free
22 July 2024	Bénie Traoré	Sheffield United	Basel	Undisclosed
22 July 2024	Caleb Wiley	Atlanta United	Chelsea	£8.5m
22 July 2024	Marcus Wyllie	Enfield Town	Gillingham	Undisclosed
23 July 2024	Ché Adams	Southampton	Torino	Free
23 July 2024	Albert Adomah	Queens Park Rangers	Walsall	Free
23 July 2024	Cody Drameh	Leeds United	Hull City	Free
23 July 2024	Tom Flanagan	Shrewsbury Town	Colchester United	Free
23 July 2024	Dimitris Giannoulis	Norwich City	FC Augsburg	Free
23 July 2024	Donald Love	Morecambe	Accrington Stanley	Free
23 July 2024	Lawrence Vigouroux	Burnley	Swansea City	Undisclosed
23 July 2024	Ben Woodburn	Preston North End	Salford City	Free
24 July 2024	Nick Akoto	South Georgia Tormenta	Burton Albion	Undisclosed
24 July 2024	Max Anderson	Dundee	Crawley Town	Undisclosed
24 July 2024	Moussa Diaby	Aston Villa	Al-Ittihad	£50.4m
24 July 2024	Ben Heneghan	Fleetwood Town	Port Vale	Free
24 July 2024	Sam Hornby	Colchester United	Walsall	Free
24 July 2024	Ian Poveda	Leeds United	Sunderland	Free
24 July 2024	Toby Sibbick	Heart of Midlothian	Wigan Athletic	Undisclosed
25 July 2024	Lee Angol	Sutton United	Morecambe	Free
25 July 2024	Robbie Cundy	Barnsley	Notts County	Free
25 July 2024	Mark Helm	Burton Albion	Fleetwood Town	Undisclosed
25 July 2024	Marc Leonard	Brighton & Hove Albion	Birmingham City	Undisclosed
25 July 2024	Oli McBurnie	Sheffield United	Las Palmas	Free
25 July 2024	Paddy McNair	Middlesbrough	San Diego	Free
25 July 2024	Victor Pálsson	Eupen	Plymouth Argyle	Free
25 July 2024	Junior Quitirna	Fleetwood Town	Crawley Town	Undisclosed
25 July 2024	Terence Vancooten	Stevenage	Burton Albion	Undisclosed
26 July 2024	Ryan Bowman	Shrewsbury Town	Cheltenham Town	Free
26 July 2024	Declan Drysdale	Newport County	Tranmere Rovers	Free
26 July 2024	Jacob Farrell	Central Coast Mariners	Portsmouth	Undisclosed
26 July 2024	Jack Hinchy	Brighton & Hove Albion	Notts County	Free
26 July 2024	Ryan Sessegnon	Tottenham Hotspur	Fulham	Free
26 July 2024	Tyreece Simpson	Huddersfield Town	Stevenage	Undisclosed
26 July 2024	Jack Sparkes	Portsmouth	Peterborough United	Undisclosed
27 July 2024	Harrison Burrows	Peterborough United	Sheffield United	Undisclosed
27 July 2024	Jack Holmes	Stamford	Rotherham United	Free
27 July 2024	Harry Isted	Charlton Athletic	Burton Albion	Undisclosed
27 July 2024	Joe Young	Wolverhampton Wanderers	Shrewsbury Town	Free
28 July 2024	Aidan Keena	Cheltenham Town	St Patrick's Athletic	Free
28 July 2024	Raphaël Varane	Manchester United	Como	Free
29 July 2024	Riccardo Calafiori	Bologna	Arsenal	£42m
30 July 2024	Ben Brereton Díaz	Villarreal	Southampton	£7m
30 July 2024	Ben Chrisene	Aston Villa	Norwich City	Undisclosed
30 July 2024	Mohamed Elneny	Arsenal	Al Jazira	Free
30 July 2024	Makhtar Gueye	Molenbeek	Blackburn Rovers	Undisclosed
30 July 2024	Dean Huijsen	Juventus	Bournemouth	£12.8m
30 July 2024	Ben Jackson	Huddersfield Town	Barrow	Undisclosed
30 July 2024	Filip Jörgensen	Villarreal	Chelsea	£20.7m
30 July 2024	Kuryu Matsuki	FC Tokyo	Southampton	Undisclosed
30 July 2024	Corrie Ndaba	Ipswich Town	Kilmarnock	Undisclosed
30 July 2024	Jake O'Brien	Lyon	Everton	£16.4m
30 July 2024	Jordan Rossiter	Bristol Rovers	Shrewsbury Town	Free
30 July 2024	Shola Shoretire	Manchester United	PAOK	Free
31 July 2024	Devante Cole	Barnsley	West Bromwich Albion	Free
31 July 2024	Sam Gallagher	Blackburn Rovers	Stoke City	Undisclosed
31 July 2024	Exaucé Mafoumbi	Nantes	Blackburn Rovers	Undisclosed
31 July 2024	Kyle McFadzean	Unattached	Blackburn Rovers	Free
31 July 2024	Yuki Ohashi	Sanfrecce Hiroshima	Blackburn Rovers	Undisclosed
31 July 2024	Okay Yokuşlu	West Bromwich Albion	Trabzonspor	Undisclosed
1 August 2024	Danny Batth	Norwich City	Blackburn Rovers	Free
1 August 2024	James Connolly	Bristol Rovers	Crewe Alexandra	Undisclosed
1 August 2024	Vontae Daley-Campbell	Peterborough United	Chesterfield	Free
1 August 2024	Anwar El Ghazi	Unattached	Cardiff City	Free
1 August 2024	Pascal Groß	Brighton & Hove Albion	Borussia Dortmund	Undisclosed
1 August 2024	Liam McCarron	Stoke City	Northampton Town	Undisclosed
1 August 2024	Marvin Mehlem	SV Darmstadt 98	Hull City	Undisclosed
1 August 2024	Matt Phillips	West Bromwich Albion	Oxford United	Free
1 August 2024	Ismaïla Sarr	Marseille	Crystal Palace	£12.5m
1 August 2024	Jota Silva	Vitória de Guimarães	Nottingham Forest	Undisclosed
1 August 2024	Brandon Thomas-Asante	West Bromwich Albion	Coventry City	Undisclosed
1 August 2024	Conor Townsend	West Bromwich Albion	Ipswich Town	Undisclosed
1 August 2024	Žan Vipotnik	Bordeaux	Swansea City	Free
1 August 2024	Oscar Wallin	Degerfors	Peterborough United	Undisclosed
1 August 2024	Andreas Weimann	Bristol City	Blackburn Rovers	Free
2 August 2024	Georgie Gent	Blackburn Rovers	Barnsley	Undisclosed
2 August 2024	Blondy Nna Noukeu	Stoke City	Sunderland	Free
2 August 2024	Omari Patrick	Sutton United	Tranmere Rovers	Free
2 August 2024	Dan Scarr	Plymouth Argyle	Wrexham	Undisclosed
2 August 2024	Szabolcs Schön	Fehérvár	Bolton Wanderers	Undisclosed
2 August 2024	Emile Smith Rowe	Arsenal	Fulham	£27m
2 August 2024	Elias Sørensen	Esbjerg	Portsmouth	Undisclosed
2 August 2024	Ivan Šunjić	Birmingham City	Pafos	Free
3 August 2024	Alfie Bendle	Forest Green Rovers	Colchester United	Free
3 August 2024	Jorge Cuenca	Villarreal	Fulham	Undisclosed
3 August 2024	Ben Quinn	Celtic	Mansfield Town	Free
3 August 2024	Crysencio Summerville	Leeds United	West Ham United	Undisclosed
4 August 2024	Gabriel Sara	Norwich City	Galatasaray	£15.3m
4 August 2024	Jonathan Varane	Sporting Gijón	Queens Park Rangers	Undisclosed
5 August 2024	Ibrahim Bakare	Unattached	Cheltenham Town	Free
5 August 2024	Andre Dozzell	Queens Park Rangers	Portsmouth	Free
5 August 2024	Niclas Füllkrug	Borussia Dortmund	West Ham United	£27m
5 August 2024	Charlie Goode	Brentford	Stevenage	Free
5 August 2024	Jeff King	Chesterfield	Swindon Town	Free
5 August 2024	Chris Stokes	Morecambe	Barrow	Free
6 August 2024	Panutche Camará	Ipswich Town	Crawley Town	Free
6 August 2024	Will Evans	Newport County	Mansfield Town	Undisclosed
6 August 2024	Gianluca Frabotta	Juventus	West Bromwich Albion	Undisclosed
6 August 2024	Matt Ritchie	Newcastle United	Portsmouth	Free
6 August 2024	Guido Rodríguez	Real Betis	West Ham United	Free
6 August 2024	Kornél Szűcs	Kecskeméti	Plymouth Argyle	Undisclosed
6 August 2024	Euan Williams	Charlton Athletic	Gillingham	Free
7 August 2024	Teddy Bishop	Lincoln City	Colchester United	Free
7 August 2024	Rohan Luthra	Cardiff City	Derby County	Free
7 August 2024	Etienne Green	Saint-Étienne	Burnley	Undisclosed
7 August 2024	Tim Ream	Fulham	Charlotte FC	Undisclosed
7 August 2024	Alexander Robertson	Manchester City	Cardiff City	Up to £3m
8 August 2024	Kayky Almeida	Fluminense	Watford	Undisclosed
8 August 2024	Aaron Anselmino	Boca Juniors	Chelsea	£15.6m
8 August 2024	Elliot Embleton	Sunderland	Blackpool	Undisclosed
8 August 2024	Hamzad Kargbo	Queens Park Rangers	Newport County	Free
8 August 2024	Jordi Osei-Tutu	VfL Bochum	Bolton Wanderers	Undisclosed
8 August 2024	William Osula	Sheffield United	Newcastle United	Undisclosed
8 August 2024	Anthony Racioppi	Young Boys	Hull City	Undisclosed
8 August 2024	Iké Ugbo	Troyes	Sheffield Wednesday	Undisclosed
9 August 2024	Forson Amankwah	Red Bull Salzburg	Norwich City	Undisclosed
9 August 2024	Micah Anthony	Queens Park Rangers	Bristol Rovers	Free
9 August 2024	Tariqe Fosu	Unattached	Northampton Town	Free
9 August 2024	Conor Grant	Milton Keynes Dons	Notts County	Undisclosed
9 August 2024	Micah Hamilton	Manchester City	Middlesbrough	Undisclosed
9 August 2024	Kyle John	Everton	Port Vale	Free
9 August 2024	Jordan Jones	Unattached	Wigan Athletic	Free
9 August 2024	Billy Kirkman	The New Saints	Swindon Town	Undisclosed
9 August 2024	John McAtee	Luton Town	Bolton Wanderers	Undisclosed
9 August 2024	Liam Millar	Basel	Hull City	Undisclosed
9 August 2024	George Miller	Doncaster Rovers	Cheltenham Town	Undisclosed
9 August 2024	Aaron Nemane	Notts County	Milton Keynes Dons	Undisclosed
9 August 2024	Oliver Rathbone	Rotherham United	Wrexham	Undisclosed
9 August 2024	Deniz Undav	Brighton & Hove Albion	VfB Stuttgart	Undisclosed
10 August 2024	Dominic Solanke	Bournemouth	Tottenham Hotspur	£55m
10 August 2024	Wesley	Stoke City	Fatih Karagümrük	Free
10 August 2024	Ben Williams	Cheltenham Town	Carlisle United	Free
10 August 2024	Ayumu Yokoyama	Sagan Tosu	Birmingham City	Undisclosed
11 August 2024	Tyrese Campbell	Stoke City	Sheffield United	Free
11 August 2024	Pedro Neto	Wolverhampton Wanderers	Chelsea	£51.3m
12 August 2024	Julián Álvarez	Manchester City	Atlético Madrid	£64.4m
12 August 2024	Fábio Carvalho	Liverpool	Brentford	£27.5m
12 August 2024	Jordan James	Birmingham City	Rennes	Undisclosed
12 August 2024	Bosun Lawal	Celtic	Stoke City	Undisclosed
12 August 2024	Kelechi Nwakali	Chaves	Barnsley	Undisclosed
12 August 2024	Mipo Odubeko	Marítimo	Fleetwood Town	Free
12 August 2024	Emerson Royal	Tottenham Hotspur	AC Milan	Undisclosed
13 August 2024	Julián Araujo	Barcelona	Bournemouth	Undisclosed
13 August 2024	Matthijs de Ligt	Bayern Munich	Manchester United	£38.5m
13 August 2024	Mehdi Léris	Stoke City	Pisa	Undisclosed
13 August 2024	Noussair Mazraoui	Bayern Munich	Manchester United	£12.8m
13 August 2024	Jeppe Okkels	Utrecht	Preston North End	Undisclosed
13 August 2024	Aaron Wan-Bissaka	Manchester United	West Ham United	£15m
14 August 2024	Diamond Edwards	Southampton	Port Vale	Free
14 August 2024	Brajan Gruda	Mainz 05	Brighton & Hove Albion	£25m
14 August 2024	Adam Idah	Norwich City	Celtic	Undisclosed
14 August 2024	Brooke Norton-Cuffy	Arsenal	Genoa	Undisclosed
15 August 2024	Michael Cooper	Plymouth Argyle	Sheffield United	Undisclosed
15 August 2024	Bradley Dack	Sunderland	Gillingham	Free
15 August 2024	Riley Harbottle	Hibernian	AFC Wimbledon	Undisclosed
15 August 2024	Tola Showunmi	Louisville City	Crawley Town	Undisclosed
16 August 2024	Cameron Archer	Aston Villa	Southampton	£15m
16 August 2024	Mason Burstow	Chelsea	Hull City	Undisclosed
16 August 2024	Tommy Conway	Bristol City	Middlesbrough	Undisclosed
16 August 2024	Evanilson	Porto	Bournemouth	£31.7m
16 August 2024	Charlie Hughes	Wigan Athletic	Hull City	Undisclosed
16 August 2024	Diego Moreira	Chelsea	Strasbourg	£1.7m
16 August 2024	Wilson Odobert	Burnley	Tottenham Hotspur	£25m
16 August 2024	Ramón Sosa	Talleres	Nottingham Forest	£9.3m
16 August 2024	Sammie Szmodics	Blackburn Rovers	Ipswich Town	Undisclosed
16 August 2024	Scott Twine	Burnley	Bristol City	Undisclosed
16 August 2024	Jacob Widell Zetterström	Djurgården	Derby County	Undisclosed
17 August 2024	Josh Austerfield	Huddersfield Town	Salford City	Free
19 August 2024	Marselino Ferdinan	Deinze	Oxford United	Free
19 August 2024	Georginio Rutter	Leeds United	Brighton & Hove Albion	£40m
19 August 2024	Oliver Skipp	Tottenham Hotspur	Leicester City	£20m
19 August 2024	Hidde ter Avest	Utrecht	Oxford United	Free
20 August 2024	Jesper Daland	Cercle Brugge	Cardiff City	Undisclosed
20 August 2024	Mateus Fernandes	Sporting CP	Southampton	£15m
20 August 2024	Abdoulaye Kamara	Borussia Dortmund	Portsmouth	Undisclosed
20 August 2024	Mark McGuinness	Cardiff City	Luton Town	Undisclosed
20 August 2024	Liam Walsh	Swansea City	Luton Town	Free
21 August 2024	Femi Azeez	Reading	Millwall	Undisclosed
21 August 2024	Norman Bassette	Caen	Coventry City	Undisclosed
21 August 2024	João Félix	Atlético Madrid	Chelsea	£45m
21 August 2024	Conor Gallagher	Chelsea	Atlético Madrid	£33m
21 August 2024	Facundo Pellistri	Manchester United	Panathinaikos	£5.1m
21 August 2024	Nicolas Schmid	Blau-Weiß Linz	Portsmouth	Undisclosed
22 August 2024	Sander Berge	Burnley	Fulham	£25m
22 August 2024	Bobby Clark	Liverpool	Red Bull Salzburg	£10m
22 August 2024	Ante Crnac	Raków Częstochowa	Norwich City	Undisclosed
22 August 2024	Bambo Diaby	Sheffield Wednesday	Elche	Undisclosed
22 August 2024	Lucas Ness	Charlton Athletic	Notts County	Undisclosed
22 August 2024	Largie Ramazani	Almería	Leeds United	Undisclosed
22 August 2024	Sepp van den Berg	Liverpool	Brentford	£25m
22 August 2024	Joe Worrall	Nottingham Forest	Burnley	Undisclosed
22 August 2024	Anass Zaroury	Burnley	Lens	Undisclosed
23 August 2024	Joachim Andersen	Crystal Palace	Fulham	£30m
23 August 2024	Yáser Asprilla	Watford	Girona	Undisclosed
23 August 2024	Jordan Ayew	Crystal Palace	Leicester City	£5m
23 August 2024	Asmir Begović	Queens Park Rangers	Everton	Free
23 August 2024	Jóhann Berg Guðmundsson	Burnley	Al-Orobah	Undisclosed
23 August 2024	Florian Bianchini	Bastia	Swansea City	£1.95m
23 August 2024	Harvey Blair	Liverpool	Portsmouth	£300k
23 August 2024	Kaheim Dixon	Arnett Gardens	Charlton Athletic	Undisclosed
23 August 2024	İlkay Gündoğan	Barcelona	Manchester City	Free
23 August 2024	Daniel Grimshaw	Blackpool	Plymouth Argyle	Undisclosed
23 August 2024	Daniel Kelly	Celtic	Millwall	Undisclosed
23 August 2024	Nicolas Madsen	Westerlo	Queens Park Rangers	Undisclosed
23 August 2024	Marcus McGuane	Oxford United	Bristol City	Undisclosed
23 August 2024	Oliver Norwood	Sheffield United	Stockport County	Free
23 August 2024	Erik Ring	AIK	Lincoln City	Free
23 August 2024	Jean Michaël Seri	Hull City	Al-Orobah	Free
24 August 2024	Jack Clarke	Sunderland	Ipswich Town	£15m
24 August 2024	Oscar Schwartau	Brøndby	Norwich City	Undisclosed
24 August 2024	Callum Styles	Barnsley	West Bromwich Albion	Undisclosed
25 August 2024	David Carmo	Porto	Nottingham Forest	Undisclosed
25 August 2024	Wesley Hoedt	Watford	Al Shabab	Undisclosed
25 August 2024	Dara O'Shea	Burnley	Ipswich Town	Undisclosed
26 August 2024	Pierre Dwomoh	Antwerp	Watford	Undisclosed
26 August 2024	Matt O'Riley	Celtic	Brighton & Hove Albion	£25m
26 August 2024	Charlie Patino	Arsenal	Deportivo La Coruña	£1m
27 August 2024	Ameen Al-Dakhil	Burnley	VfB Stuttgart	Undisclosed
27 August 2024	Neto Borges	Clermont	Middlesbrough	Undisclosed
27 August 2024	João Cancelo	Manchester City	Al-Hilal	£21.2m
27 August 2024	Jordan Jones	Wigan Athletic	Carlisle United	Undisclosed
27 August 2024	Ferdi Kadıoğlu	Fenerbahçe	Brighton & Hove Albion	£25m
27 August 2024	Mikel Merino	Real Sociedad	Arsenal	£27.4m
27 August 2024	Angelo Ogbonna	Unattached	Watford	Free
28 August 2024	Juninho Bacuna	Birmingham City	Al-Wehda	Undisclosed
28 August 2024	Zach Booth	Leicester City	Excelsior	Undisclosed
28 August 2024	Lyndon Dykes	Queens Park Rangers	Birmingham City	Undisclosed
28 August 2024	Hannibal Mejbri	Manchester United	Burnley	Undisclosed
28 August 2024	Gustavo Nunes	Grêmio	Brentford	£10m-plus
28 August 2024	Chiedozie Ogbene	Luton Town	Ipswich Town	£8m
29 August 2024	Tino Anjorin	Chelsea	Empoli	Undisclosed
29 August 2024	Vakoun Issouf Bayo	Watford	Udinese	Undisclosed
29 August 2024	Federico Chiesa	Juventus	Liverpool	£10m-plus
29 August 2024	Siriki Dembélé	Birmingham City	Oxford United	Undisclosed
29 August 2024	Bilal El Khannouss	Genk	Leicester City	£21m
29 August 2024	Óscar Estupiñán	Hull City	Juárez	Undisclosed
29 August 2024	Kévin Keben	Toulouse	Watford	Undisclosed
29 August 2024	Gavin Kilkenny	Bournemouth	Swindon Town	Undisclosed
29 August 2024	Romelu Lukaku	Chelsea	Napoli	£25.2m
29 August 2024	João Mendes	Barcelona	Burnley	Undisclosed
29 August 2024	Bastien Meupiyou	Nantes	Wolverhampton Wanderers	Undisclosed
29 August 2024	Wout Weghorst	Burnley	Ajax	Undisclosed
29 August 2024	Jensen Weir	Brighton & Hove Albion	Wigan Athletic	Undisclosed
30 August 2024	Ahmed Abdullahi	Gent	Sunderland	Undisclosed
30 August 2024	Hakeeb Adelakun	Unattached	Salford City	Free
30 August 2024	Oluwaseun Adewumi	Floridsdorfer AC	Burnley	Undisclosed
30 August 2024	Rami Al Hajj	OB	Plymouth Argyle	Undisclosed
30 August 2024	Milan Aleksić	Radnički 1923	Sunderland	Undisclosed
30 August 2024	André	Fluminense	Wolverhampton Wanderers	£18.5m-plus
30 August 2024	Maleace Asamoah	Fleetwood Town	Wigan Athletic	Undisclosed
30 August 2024	Mohamed Belloumi	Farense	Hull City	Undisclosed
30 August 2024	Ibane Bowat	Fulham	Portsmouth	Undisclosed
30 August 2024	Danny Butterworth	Carlisle United	Swindon Town	Undisclosed
30 August 2024	Todd Cantwell	Rangers	Blackburn Rovers	Undisclosed
30 August 2024	George Cox	Volendam	Swindon Town	Free
30 August 2024	Reuben Egan	Unattached	Tranmere Rovers	Free
30 August 2024	Modou Faal	West Bromwich Albion	Wrexham	£500k
30 August 2024	Lamine Fanne	AIK	Luton Town	Undisclosed
30 August 2024	Shaq Forde	Watford	Bristol Rovers	Undisclosed
30 August 2024	Shamal George	Livingston	Wycombe Wanderers	Undisclosed
30 August 2024	Billy Gee	Chelsea	Norwich City	Undisclosed
30 August 2024	Alex Gilliead	Bradford City	Shrewsbury Town	Free
30 August 2024	Billy Gilmour	Brighton & Hove Albion	Napoli	£16m
30 August 2024	Stephen Humphrys	Wigan Athletic	Barnsley	Free
30 August 2024	Bradley Ihionvien	Colchester United	Peterborough United	Undisclosed
30 August 2024	Mihailo Ivanović	Vojvodina	Millwall	Undisclosed
30 August 2024	Tomoki Iwata	Celtic	Birmingham City	Undisclosed
30 August 2024	Mikey Johnston	Celtic	West Bromwich Albion	Undisclosed
30 August 2024	Sam Johnstone	Crystal Palace	Wolverhampton Wanderers	£10m
30 August 2024	Pat Jones	Huddersfield Town	Exeter City	Undisclosed
30 August 2024	Abu Kamara	Norwich City	Hull City	Undisclosed
30 August 2024	Davis Keillor-Dunn	Mansfield Town	Barnsley	Undisclosed
30 August 2024	Maxence Lacroix	VfL Wolfsburg	Crystal Palace	£18m
30 August 2024	Josh Laurent	Stoke City	Burnley	Undisclosed
30 August 2024	Sebastian Lochhead	Dundee	Wolverhampton Wanderers	Undisclosed
30 August 2024	Luke McNally	Burnley	Bristol City	Undisclosed
30 August 2024	Scott McTominay	Manchester United	Napoli	£25.7m
30 August 2024	Jayden Meghoma	Southampton	Brentford	£5m-plus
30 August 2024	Kōji Miyoshi	Birmingham City	VfL Bochum	Undisclosed
30 August 2024	Haji Mnoga	Portsmouth	Salford City	Free
30 August 2024	Morato	Benfica	Nottingham Forest	£12.6m
30 August 2024	Yeimar Mosquera	Orsomarso	Aston Villa	Undisclosed
30 August 2024	Eddie Nketiah	Arsenal	Crystal Palace	£30m
30 August 2024	Saheed Olagunju	Chelsea	Wolverhampton Wanderers	Undisclosed
30 August 2024	Kasey Palmer	Coventry City	Hull City	Undisclosed
30 August 2024	Aaron Ramsdale	Arsenal	Southampton	£18m-plus
30 August 2024	Isaac Schmidt	St. Gallen	Leeds United	Undisclosed
30 August 2024	Tatsuki Seko	Kawasaki Frontale	Stoke City	Undisclosed
30 August 2024	Roko Šimić	Red Bull Salzburg	Cardiff City	Undisclosed
30 August 2024	Jay Stansfield	Fulham	Birmingham City	Undisclosed
30 August 2024	Ethan Sutherland	St Mirren	Wolverhampton Wanderers	Undisclosed
30 August 2024	Will Swan	Mansfield Town	Crawley Town	Undisclosed
30 August 2024	Ao Tanaka	Fortuna Düsseldorf	Leeds United	Undisclosed
30 August 2024	Kane Thompson-Sommers	FC Halifax Town	Milton Keynes Dons	Undisclosed
30 August 2024	Ivan Toney	Brentford	Al-Ahli	Undisclosed
30 August 2024	Balázs Tóth	Fehérvár	Blackburn Rovers	Undisclosed
30 August 2024	Manuel Ugarte	Paris Saint-Germain	Manchester United	£50m
30 August 2024	Vitinho	Burnley	Botafogo	Undisclosed
30 August 2024	Scott Wright	Rangers	Birmingham City	Undisclosed
30 August 2024	Jake Young	Bradford City	Stevenage	Undisclosed

== Loans ==
Start date	End date	Player	Moving from	Moving to
2 February 2024	31 May 2024	Saïd Benrahma	West Ham United	Lyon
2 February 2024	31 May 2024	Conor Grant	Milton Keynes Dons	Barnsley
9 February 2024	31 May 2024	Óscar Estupiñán	Hull City	Bahia
13 February 2024	20 February 2024	Vicente Reyes	Norwich City	Forest Green Rovers
15 February 2024	31 May 2024	Max Mata	Shrewsbury Town	Sligo Rovers
12 April 2024	31 May 2024	Kieran Phillips	Huddersfield Town	Sacramento Republic
13 April 2024	27 April 2024	Max Stryjek	Wycombe Wanderers	Crewe Alexandra
14 June 2024	31 May 2025	Ellery Balcombe	Brentford	St Mirren
14 June 2024	31 May 2025	Max Mata	Shrewsbury Town	Auckland
14 June 2024	31 May 2025	Michael Olakigbe	Brentford	Wigan Athletic
14 June 2024	31 May 2025	Dion Pereira	Luton Town	Dagenham & Redbridge
14 June 2024	31 May 2025	Calvin Ramsay	Liverpool	Wigan Athletic
14 June 2024	31 May 2025	Teddy Sharman-Lowe	Chelsea	Doncaster Rovers
14 June 2024	31 May 2025	Timo Werner	RB Leipzig	Tottenham Hotpsur
14 June 2024	31 May 2025	Ephraim Yeboah	Bristol City	Doncaster Rovers
21 June 2024	31 May 2025	Marko Stamenić	Nottingham Forest	Olympiacos
24 June 2024	31 May 2025	Jack Harrison	Leeds United	Everton
24 June 2024	31 May 2025	Jamie Knight-Lebel	Bristol City	Crewe Alexandra
25 June 2024	31 May 2025	Nathan Bishop	Sunderland	Wycombe Wanderers
25 June 2024	31 May 2025	Jack Walton	Luton Town	Dundee United
27 June 2024	31 May 2025	Andrew Dallas	Barnsley	Barrow
27 June 2024	31 May 2025	Sonny Perkins	Leeds United	Leyton Orient
28 June 2024	31 May 2025	Krisztián Hegyi	West Ham United	Motherwell
29 June 2024	31 May 2025	Charlie Kelman	Queens Park Rangers	Leyton Orient
29 June 2024	31 May 2025	Stephan Negru	Oxford United	Salford City
30 June 2024	31 May 2025	Ted Curd	Chelsea	Hampton & Richmond Borough
1 July 2024	31 May 2025	Douglas James-Taylor	Walsall	Drogheda United
1 July 2024	31 May 2025	Samuel Silvera	Middlesbrough	Portsmouth
1 July 2024	31 May 2025	Alistair Smith	Lincoln City	AFC Wimbledon
2 July 2024	31 May 2025	Darko Gyabi	Leeds United	Plymouth Argyle
2 July 2024	31 May 2025	Jørgen Strand Larsen	Celta Vigo	Wolverhampton Wanderers
2 July 2024	31 May 2025	Vicente Reyes	Norwich City	Cambridge United
2 July 2024	31 May 2025	Tommy Simkin	Stoke City	Walsall
2 July 2024	31 May 2025	Muhamed Tijani	Slavia Prague	Plymouth Argyle
2 July 2024	31 May 2025	Jerry Yates	Swansea City	Derby County
3 July 2024	31 May 2025	Dylan Williams	Chelsea	Burton Albion
4 July 2024	31 May 2025	Zach Awe	Southampton	Accrington Stanley
4 July 2024	31 May 2025	James Beadle	Brighton & Hove Albion	Sheffield Wednesday
4 July 2024	31 May 2025	Callum Morton	Salford City	Northampton Town
5 July 2024	31 May 2025	Michael Forbes	West Ham United	Bristol Rovers
5 July 2024	31 May 2025	Sam Greenwood	Leeds United	Preston North End
9 July 2024	31 May 2025	Ibrahim Cissoko	Toulouse	Plymouth Argyle
9 July 2024	31 May 2025	Yu Hirakawa	Machida Zelvia	Bristol City
10 July 2024	31 May 2025	Philippe Coutinho	Aston Villa	Vasco da Gama
10 July 2024	31 May 2025	Michael Dacosta Gonzalez	Bournemouth	Crawley Town
10 July 2024	31 May 2025	Josh Griffiths	West Bromwich Albion	Bristol Rovers
10 July 2024	31 May 2025	Joseph Hungbo	1. FC Nürnberg	Rotherham United
11 July 2024	31 May 2025	Tommi O'Reilly	Aston Villa	Shrewsbury Town
11 July 2024	31 May 2025	Joe Pigott	Leyton Orient	AFC Wimbledon
11 July 2024	31 May 2025	Joe Rothwell	Bournemouth	Leeds United
12 July 2024	31 May 2025	Callum Jones	Hull City	Morecambe
13 July 2024	31 May 2025	Taylor Richards	Queens Park Rangers	Cambridge United
16 July 2024	31 May 2025	Owen Goodman	Crystal Palace	AFC Wimbledon
16 July 2024	31 May 2025	Michael Mellon	Burnley	Stockport County
16 July 2024	31 May 2025	Joe Whitworth	Crystal Palace	Exeter City
18 July 2024	31 May 2025	Esapa Osong	Nottingham Forest	Rotherham United
18 July 2024	31 May 2025	Matthew Young	Sunderland	Salford City
19 July 2024	31 December 2024	Kamarl Grant	Millwall	Bromley
19 July 2024	31 May 2025	Rasmus Kristensen	Leeds United	Eintracht Frankfurt
19 July 2024	31 May 2025	Filip Marschall	Aston Villa	Crewe Alexandra
19 July 2024	31 May 2025	Lewis Payne	Southampton	Cheltenham Town
22 July 2024	31 May 2025	Pierre-Emile Højbjerg	Tottenham Hotspur	Marseille
22 July 2024	31 May 2025	Antonio Tikvić	Udinese	Watford
23 July 2024	31 May 2025	Matthew Craig	Tottenham Hotspur	Barnsley
23 July 2024	31 May 2025	Zach Hemming	Middlesbrough	Leyton Orient
23 July 2024	31 May 2025	Johnly Yfeko	Rangers	Exeter City
24 July 2024	31 May 2025	Tom McGill	Brighton & Hove Albion	Milton Keynes Dons
24 July 2024	31 May 2025	David Ozoh	Crystal Palace	Derby County
25 July 2024	31 May 2025	Joe Hugill	Manchester United	Wigan Athletic
25 July 2024	31 December 2024	Paddy McNair	San Diego	West Bromwich Albion
26 July 2024	31 May 2025	Tayo Adaramola	Crystal Palace	Stockport County
26 July 2024	31 May 2025	Matt Dibley-Dias	Fulham	Northampton Town
26 July 2024	31 May 2025	Miguel Freckleton	Sheffield United	Swindon Town
26 July 2024	31 May 2025	Levi Laing	West Ham United	Cheltenham Town
26 July 2024	31 May 2025	Jesper Lindstrøm	Napoli	Everton
26 July 2024	31 May 2025	Silko Thomas	Leicester City	Wigan Athletic
26 July 2024	31 December 2024	Finn Tonks	Bournemouth	Torquay United
27 July 2024	31 May 2025	Joshua Kayode	Rotherham United	Shrewsbury Town
29 July 2024	31 May 2025	James Furlong	Hull City	AFC Wimbledon
29 July 2024	31 May 2025	Bryan Gil	Tottenham Hotspur	Girona
30 July 2024	31 May 2025	Joel Cotterill	Swansea City	Swindon Town
30 July 2024	31 May 2025	Neo Eccleston	Huddersfield Town	Barrow
30 July 2024	31 May 2025	Wilfried Kanga	Hertha BSC	Cardiff City
30 July 2024	31 May 2025	Ziyad Larkeche	Queens Park Rangers	Dundee
30 July 2024	31 May 2025	Kuryu Matsuki	Southampton	Göztepe
30 July 2024	31 May 2025	Sorba Thomas	Huddersfield Town	Nantes
31 July 2024	31 May 2025	Cam Bragg	Southampton	Crawley Town
31 July 2024	31 May 2025	Tristan Crama	Brentford	Exeter City
1 August 2024	31 May 2025	Daniel Adu-Adjei	Bournemouth	Carlisle United
1 August 2024	31 May 2025	Zak Bradshaw	Lincoln City	Tranmere Rovers
1 August 2024	31 May 2025	Yasser Larouci	Troyes	Watford
1 August 2024	31 May 2025	Jack Shepherd	Barnsley	Bradford City
2 August 2024	31 May 2025	Louie Barry	Aston Villa	Stockport County
2 August 2024	31 May 2025	Joel Colwill	Cardiff City	Cheltenham Town
2 August 2024	31 May 2025	Cameron Congreve	Swansea City	Bromley
2 August 2024	31 May 2025	Sam Curtis	Sheffield United	Peterborough United
2 August 2024	31 May 2025	Malcolm Ebiowei	Crystal Palace	Oxford United
2 August 2024	31 May 2025	Nico Lawrence	Southampton	Milton Keynes Dons
2 August 2024	31 May 2025	Andrey Santos	Chelsea	Strasbourg
2 August 2024	31 May 2025	Jacob Wakeling	Peterborough United	Gillingham
3 August 2024	31 May 2025	Murphy Cooper	Queens Park Rangers	Stevenage
3 August 2024	31 May 2025	Yan Couto	Manchester City	Borussia Dortmund
3 August 2024	31 May 2025	Jake Garrett	Blackburn Rovers	Bristol Rovers
5 August 2024	31 May 2025	Elkan Baggott	Ipswich Town	Blackpool
5 August 2024	31 May 2025	Luke Harris	Fulham	Birmingham City
5 August 2024	31 May 2025	Devan Tanton	Fulham	Chesterfield
6 August 2024	31 May 2025	Luca Barrington	Brighton & Hove Albion	Grimsby Town
6 August 2024	31 May 2025	Luke Chambers	Liverpool	Wigan Athletic
6 August 2024	31 May 2025	Lewis Dobbin	Aston Villa	West Bromwich Albion
6 August 2024	31 May 2025	Callum Doyle	Manchester City	Norwich City
6 August 2024	31 May 2025	Josh Feeney	Aston Villa	Shrewsbury Town
6 August 2024	31 May 2025	Harry Souttar	Leicester City	Sheffield United
6 August 2024	31 May 2025	Mahamadou Susoho	Manchester City	Peterborough United
7 August 2024	31 May 2025	Benicio Baker-Boaitey	Brighton & Hove Albion	Port Vale
7 August 2024	31 May 2025	Alfie Gilchrist	Chelsea	Sheffield United
7 August 2024	31 May 2025	Kaine Kesler-Hayden	Aston Villa	Preston North End
7 August 2024	31 May 2025	Alejo Véliz	Tottenham Hotspur	Espanyol
8 August 2024	31 May 2025	Aaron Anselmino	Chelsea	Boca Juniors
8 August 2024	31 May 2025	Dara Costelloe	Burnley	Accrington Stanley
8 August 2024	31 May 2025	Jordan Davies	Wrexham	Grimsby Town
8 August 2024	31 May 2025	Patrick Kelly	West Ham United	Doncaster Rovers
8 August 2024	31 May 2025	Jay Matete	Sunderland	Bolton Wanderers
9 August 2024	31 May 2025	Eddie Beach	Chelsea	Crawley Town
9 August 2024	31 May 2025	Finley Burns	Manchester City	Hull City
9 August 2024	31 May 2025	Max Conway	Bolton Wanderers	Crewe Alexandra
9 August 2024	31 May 2025	Callum Marshall	West Ham United	Huddersfield Town
9 August 2024	31 May 2025	Tyler Onyango	Everton	Stockport County
9 August 2024	31 May 2025	Gabriel Slonina	Chelsea	Barnsley
10 August 2024	31 May 2025	Facundo Buonanotte	Brighton & Hove Albion	Leicester City
10 August 2024	31 May 2025	Lewis Koumas	Liverpool	Stoke City
10 August 2024	31 May 2025	Jean-Clair Todibo	Nice	West Ham United
11 August 2024	31 May 2025	Caleb Wiley	Chelsea	Strasbourg
12 August 2024	31 December 2024	Dean Bouzanis	Reading	Stevenage
12 August 2024	31 May 2025	Kian Breckin	Manchester City	Crewe Alexandra
12 August 2024	31 May 2025	Luke Mbete	Manchester City	Northampton Town
12 August 2024	31 May 2025	Connor O'Riordan	Blackburn Rovers	Cambridge United
12 August 2024	31 May 2025	Alfons Sampsted	Twente	Birmingham City
12 August 2024	31 May 2025	Olly Sanderson	Fulham	Bradford City
12 August 2024	31 May 2025	Dane Scarlett	Tottenham Hotspur	Oxford United
13 August 2024	31 May 2025	Dom Ballard	Southampton	Blackpool
13 August 2024	31 May 2025	Hugo Bueno	Wolverhampton Wanderers	Feyenoord
13 August 2024	31 May 2025	Karamoko Dembélé	Brest	Queens Park Rangers
13 August 2024	31 May 2025	Karl Hein	Arsenal	Real Valladolid
13 August 2024	31 May 2025	Koki Saito	Lommel	Queens Park Rangers
14 August 2024	31 May 2025	George Earthy	West Ham United	Bristol City
14 August 2024	31 May 2025	Tyrese Fornah	Derby County	Salford City
14 August 2024	31 May 2025	Lino Sousa	Aston Villa	Bristol Rovers
15 August 2024	31 May 2025	Harvey Araujo	Fulham	Chesterfield
15 August 2024	31 May 2025	Jorge Cabezas Hurtado	Watford	PAOK
15 August 2024	31 May 2025	Brandon Fleming	Hull City	Doncaster Rovers
15 August 2024	31 May 2025	Dilan Markanday	Blackburn Rovers	Chesterfield
15 August 2024	31 May 2025	Ibrahim Osman	Brighton & Hove Albion	Feyenoord
15 August 2024	31 May 2025	Mallik Wilks	Sheffield Wednesday	Rotherham United
16 August 2024	31 May 2025	Jamie Donley	Tottenham Hotspur	Leyton Orient
16 August 2024	31 May 2025	Kamari Doyle	Brighton & Hove Albion	Exeter City
16 August 2024	31 December 2024	Nelson Khumbeni	Bolton Wanderers	Accrington Stanley
16 August 2024	31 May 2025	Andrew Moran	Brighton & Hove Albion	Stoke City
16 August 2024	31 May 2025	Kalvin Phillips	Manchester City	Ipswich Town
16 August 2024	31 May 2025	Jesurun Rak-Sakyi	Crystal Palace	Sheffield United
16 August 2024	31 May 2025	Charles Sagoe Jr	Arsenal	Shrewsbury Town
16 August 2024	31 May 2025	Lesley Ugochukwu	Chelsea	Southampton
16 August 2024	31 May 2025	Oscar Zambrano	L.D.U. Quito	Hull City
19 August 2024	31 May 2025	Jens Cajuste	Napoli	Ipswich Town
19 August 2024	31 May 2025	Samy Chouchane	Brighton & Hove Albion	Northampton Town
19 August 2024	31 May 2025	Nathan Fraser	Wolverhampton Wanderers	Zulte Waregem
20 August 2024	31 May 2025	Reyes Cleary	West Bromwich Albion	Walsall
20 August 2024	31 December 2024	Rhys Williams	Liverpool	Morecambe
21 August 2024	31 May 2025	Ki-Jana Hoever	Wolverhampton Wanderers	Auxerre
21 August 2024	31 May 2025	Bashir Humphreys	Chelsea	Burnley
21 August 2024	31 May 2025	Cameron Humphreys	Ipswich Town	Wycombe Wanderers
21 August 2024	31 May 2025	Àlex Moreno	Aston Villa	Nottingham Forest
21 August 2024	31 May 2025	Dominic Sadi	Bournemouth	Carlisle United
21 August 2024	31 May 2025	Josh Stokes	Bristol City	Cambridge United
21 August 2024	31 May 2025	Radek Vítek	Manchester United	Blau-Weiß Linz
22 August 2024	31 May 2025	Chris Bedia	Union Berlin	Hull City
22 August 2024	31 May 2025	Eli King	Cardiff City	Stevenage
22 August 2024	31 May 2025	Tom Krauß	Mainz 05	Luton Town
22 August 2024	31 May 2025	Emmanuel Longelo	Birmingham City	Cambridge United
22 August 2024	31 May 2025	Nathan Lowe	Stoke City	Walsall
22 August 2024	31 May 2025	Michael Obafemi	Burnley	Plymouth Argyle
22 August 2024	31 May 2025	Uroš Račić	Sassuolo	West Bromwich Albion
23 August 2024	31 May 2025	Nelson Abbey	Olympiacos	Swansea City
23 August 2024	31 May 2025	Joe Adams	Wigan Athletic	Bradford City
23 August 2024	31 May 2025	Kieron Evans	Cardiff City	Newport County
23 August 2024	31 May 2025	Taylor Gardner-Hickman	Bristol City	Birmingham City
23 August 2024	31 May 2025	Wilson Isidor	Zenit Saint Petersburg	Sunderland
23 August 2024	31 May 2025	Aaron Morley	Bolton Wanderers	Wycombe Wanderers
23 August 2024	31 May 2025	Ashley Phillips	Tottenham Hotspur	Stoke City
23 August 2024	31 May 2025	Jonathan Rowe	Norwich City	Marseille
23 August 2024	31 May 2025	Sam Stubbs	Bradford City	Cheltenham Town
24 August 2024	31 May 2025	Finley Munroe	Aston Villa	Real Unión
25 August 2024	31 May 2025	David Carmo	Nottingham Forest	Olympiacos
25 August 2024	31 May 2025	Ben Davies	Rangers	Birmingham City
25 August 2024	31 May 2025	Tommy Fogarty	Birmingham City	Dunfermline Athletic
25 August 2024	31 May 2025	Máximo Perrone	Manchester City	Como
26 August 2024	31 May 2025	Allan Campbell	Luton Town	Charlton Athletic
26 August 2024	31 May 2025	Leo Castledine	Chelsea	Shrewsbury Town
26 August 2024	31 May 2025	Tawanda Chirewa	Wolverhampton Wanderers	Derby County
26 August 2024	31 May 2025	Kayky	Manchester City	Sparta Rotterdam
26 August 2024	31 May 2025	Freddie Potts	West Ham United	Portsmouth
26 August 2024	31 May 2025	Kabongo Tshimanga	Peterborough United	Swindon Town
27 August 2024	31 May 2025	Owen Beck	Liverpool	Blackburn Rovers
27 August 2024	31 May 2025	Shea Charles	Southampton	Sheffield Wednesday
27 August 2024	31 May 2025	Samuel Iling-Junior	Aston Villa	Bologna
27 August 2024	31 May 2025	Gustavo Puerta	Bayer Leverkusen	Hull City
27 August 2024	31 May 2025	Manor Solomon	Tottenham Hotspur	Leeds United
27 August 2024	31 May 2025	Harry Tyrer	Everton	Blackpool
28 August 2024	31 May 2025	Bailey Cadamarteri	Sheffield Wednesday	Lincoln City
28 August 2024	31 May 2025	Joe Hodge	Wolverhampton Wanderers	Huddersfield Town
28 August 2024	31 May 2025	Nigel Lonwijk	Wolverhampton Wanderers	Huddersfield Town
28 August 2024	31 May 2025	Mark O'Mahony	Brighton & Hove Albion	Portsmouth
28 August 2024	31 May 2025	Dale Taylor	Nottingham Forest	Wigan Athletic
28 August 2024	31 May 2025	Fábio Vieira	Arsenal	Porto
28 August 2024	31 May 2025	Ryan Wintle	Cardiff City	Millwall
29 August 2024	31 May 2025	George Abbott	Tottenham Hotspur	Notts County
29 August 2024	31 May 2025	Zeki Amdouni	Burnley	Benfica
29 August 2024	31 May 2025	Jaidon Anthony	Bournemouth	Burnley
29 August 2024	31 May 2025	Kepa Arrizabalaga	Chelsea	Bournemouth
29 August 2024	31 May 2025	Lewis Baker	Stoke City	Blackburn Rovers
29 August 2024	31 May 2025	Jake Batty	Blackburn Rovers	Accrington Stanley
29 August 2024	31 May 2025	Vakoun Issouf Bayo	Udinese	Watford
29 August 2024	31 May 2025	Rhys Bennett	Manchester United	Fleetwood Town
29 August 2024	31 May 2025	Elijah Campbell	Everton	Ross County
29 August 2024	31 May 2025	Kacper Łopata	Barnsley	Ross County
29 August 2024	31 May 2025	Noah Mawene	Preston North End	Newport County
29 August 2024	31 May 2025	Jamie Miley	Newcastle United	Newport County
29 August 2024	31 May 2025	Amani Richards	Leicester City	Exeter City
29 August 2024	31 May 2025	Calum Scanlon	Liverpool	Millwall
29 August 2024	31 May 2025	Max Thompson	Newcastle United	Chesterfield
29 August 2024	31 May 2025	Julien Vetro	Burnley	Dundee
30 August 2024	31 May 2025	Ken Aboh	Norwich City	Stevenage
30 August 2024	31 May 2025	Sonny Aljofree	Manchester United	Accrington Stanley
30 August 2024	31 May 2025	Harrison Ashby	Newcastle United	Queens Park Rangers
30 August 2024	31 May 2025	Luca Ashby-Hammond	Fulham	Gillingham
30 August 2024	31 May 2025	Stefan Bajcetic	Liverpool	Red Bull Salzburg
30 August 2024	31 May 2025	Daniel Barden	Norwich City	Swindon Town
30 August 2024	31 May 2025	Enzo Barrenechea	Aston Villa	Valencia
30 August 2024	31 May 2025	Jay Benn	Lincoln City	Bradford City
30 August 2024	31 May 2025	Harrison Biggins	Shrewsbury Town	Carlisle United
30 August 2024	31 May 2025	Josh Bowler	Nottingham Forest	Preston North End
30 August 2024	31 May 2025	Armando Broja	Chelsea	Everton
30 August 2024	31 May 2025	Jevani Brown	Bristol Rovers	Notts County
30 August 2024	5 January 2025	Chem Campbell	Wolverhampton Wanderers	Reading
30 August 2024	31 May 2025	Tom Cannon	Leicester City	Stoke City
30 August 2024	31 May 2025	Trevoh Chalobah	Chelsea	Crystal Palace
30 August 2024	31 May 2025	Chiquinho	Wolverhampton Wanderers	Mallorca
30 August 2024	31 May 2025	Josh Coburn	Middlesbrough	Millwall
30 August 2024	31 May 2025	Maxwel Cornet	West Ham United	Southampton
30 August 2024	31 May 2025	Brandon Cover	Leicester City	Port Vale
30 August 2024	31 May 2025	Amario Cozier-Duberry	Brighton & Hove Albion	Blackburn Rovers
30 August 2024	31 May 2025	Billy Crellin	Everton	Accrington Stanley
30 August 2024	31 May 2025	Jack Currie	Oxford United	Leyton Orient
30 August 2024	31 May 2025	Marcus Dackers	Salford City	Morecambe
30 August 2024	31 May 2025	Cheick Diabate	Exeter City	Bradford City
30 August 2024	31 May 2025	Ben Doak	Liverpool	Middlesbrough
30 August 2024	31 May 2025	Romelle Donovan	Birmingham City	Burton Albion
30 August 2024	31 May 2025	Saxon Earley	Plymouth Argyle	Lincoln City
30 August 2024	31 May 2025	Festy Ebosele	Udinese	Watford
30 August 2024	31 May 2025	George Edmundson	Ipswich Town	Middlesbrough
30 August 2024	31 May 2025	Odsonne Édouard	Crystal Palace	Leicester City
30 August 2024	31 May 2025	Pierre Ekwah	Sunderland	Saint-Étienne
30 August 2024	31 December 2024	Lamine Fanne	Luton Town	AIK
30 August 2024	31 May 2025	Sonny Finch	Middlesbrough	Milton Keynes Dons
30 August 2024	31 May 2025	Zian Flemming	Millwall	Burnley
30 August 2024	31 May 2025	Carlos Forbs	Ajax	Wolverhampton Wanderers
30 August 2024	31 May 2025	Kaide Gordon	Liverpool	Norwich City
30 August 2024	31 May 2025	Antwoine Hackford	Sheffield United	Port Vale
30 August 2024	31 May 2025	George Hall	Birmingham City	Walsall
30 August 2024	31 May 2025	Marcus Harness	Ipswich Town	Derby County
30 August 2024	31 May 2025	Kian Harratt	Huddersfield Town	Fleetwood Town
30 August 2024	31 May 2025	Mason Holgate	Everton	West Bromwich Albion
30 August 2024	31 May 2025	Kyle Hudlin	Huddersfield Town	Newport County
30 August 2024	31 May 2025	Bradley Ibrahim	Hertha BSC	Crawley Town
30 August 2024	31 May 2025	Daniel Jebbison	Bournemouth	Watford
30 August 2024	31 May 2025	Jadel Katongo	Manchester City	Peterborough United
30 August 2024	31 May 2025	Josh Keeley	Tottenham Hotspur	Leyton Orient
30 August 2024	31 May 2025	Saidou Khan	Swindon Town	Tranmere Rovers
30 August 2024	31 May 2025	Kylian Kouassi	Blackpool	Salford City
30 August 2024	31 May 2025	Jayden Luker	Luton Town	Grimsby Town
30 August 2024	31 May 2025	Orel Mangala	Lyon	Everton
30 August 2024	31 May 2025	Neal Maupay	Everton	Marseille
30 August 2024	31 May 2025	Jamie McDonnell	Nottingham Forest	Colchester United
30 August 2024	31 May 2025	Chris Mepham	Bournemouth	Sunderland
30 August 2024	31 May 2025	Jenson Metcalfe	Everton	Chesterfield
30 August 2024	31 May 2025	Jasper Moon	Burton Albion	Harrogate Town
30 August 2024	31 May 2025	Yeimar Mosquera	Aston Villa	Real Unión
30 August 2024	31 May 2025	Ben Nelson	Leicester City	Oxford United
30 August 2024	31 May 2025	Reiss Nelson	Arsenal	Fulham
30 August 2024	31 May 2025	Neto	Bournemouth	Arsenal
30 August 2024	31 May 2025	Dan Nlundulu	Bolton Wanderers	Cambridge United
30 August 2024	31 May 2025	Manni Norkett	Nottingham Forest	Cheltenham Town
30 August 2024	31 May 2025	Justin Obikwu	Coventry City	Grimsby Town
30 August 2024	31 May 2025	Gatlin O'Donkor	Oxford United	Bristol Rovers
30 August 2024	31 May 2025	Odeluga Offiah	Brighton & Hove Albion	Blackpool
30 August 2024	31 May 2025	Funso Ojo	Port Vale	Shrewsbury Town
30 August 2024	31 May 2025	Francis Okoronkwo	Everton	Salford City
30 August 2024	31 May 2025	Frank Onyeka	Brentford	FC Augsburg
30 August 2024	31 May 2025	Myles Peart-Harris	Brentford	Swansea City
30 August 2024	31 May 2025	Timothée Pembélé	Sunderland	Le Havre
30 August 2024	31 May 2025	Đorđe Petrović	Chelsea	Strasbourg
30 August 2024	31 May 2025	Nat Phillips	Liverpool	Derby County
30 August 2024	31 May 2025	Chris Popov	Leicester City	Barrow
30 August 2024	31 May 2025	Rico Richards	Aston Villa	Port Vale
30 August 2024	31 May 2025	Tyler Roberts	Birmingham City	Northampton Town
30 August 2024	31 May 2025	Carl Rushworth	Brighton & Hove Albion	Hull City
30 August 2024	31 May 2025	Salis Abdul Samed	Lens	Sunderland
30 August 2024	31 May 2025	Jadon Sancho	Manchester United	Chelsea
30 August 2024	31 May 2025	Jeremy Sarmiento	Brighton & Hove Albion	Burnley
30 August 2024	31 May 2025	Anthony Scully	Portsmouth	Colchester United
30 August 2024	31 December 2024	Lewis Shipley	Norwich City	Cheltenham Town
30 August 2024	31 May 2025	Fábio Silva	Wolverhampton Wanderers	Las Palmas
30 August 2024	31 May 2025	Anis Ben Slimane	Sheffield United	Norwich City
30 August 2024	31 May 2025	Carlos Soler	Paris Saint-Germain	West Ham United
30 August 2024	31 May 2025	Raheem Sterling	Chelsea	Arsenal
30 August 2024	31 May 2025	Ronnie Stutter	Chelsea	Burton Albion
30 August 2024	31 May 2025	Caleb Taylor	West Bromwich Albion	Wycombe Wanderers
30 August 2024	31 May 2025	Josh Thomas	Swansea City	Bromley
30 August 2024	31 May 2025	Ben Thompson	Stevenage	Bromley
30 August 2024	31 May 2025	Matt Turner	Nottingham Forest	Crystal Palace
30 August 2024	31 May 2025	Ben Waine	Plymouth Argyle	Mansfield Town
30 August 2024	31 May 2025	James Ward-Prowse	West Ham United	Nottingham Forest
30 August 2024	31 May 2025	Joe White	Newcastle United	Milton Keynes Dons
