= 2024–25 Crawley Town F.C. season =

129th season in existence of Crawley Town FC

Crawley Town
2024–25 season
- Owner: WAGMI United
- Chairman: Preston Johnson, Ben Levin
- Manager: Scott Lindsey (until 25 September); Ben Gladwin (interim); Rob Elliot (between 1 Oct – 19 Mar); Louis Storey (interim); Scott Lindsey (from 21 March)
- Stadium: Broadfield Stadium
- League One: 21st (relegated)
- FA Cup: Second round
- EFL Cup: Second round
- EFL Trophy: Group stage
- Average home league attendance: 4,307

The 2024–25 season was the 129th season in the history of Crawley Town Football Club and their first season back in League One since the 2014–15 season, following promotion via the play-offs in the previous season. In addition to the domestic league, the club also participated in the FA Cup, the EFL Cup, and the EFL Trophy

== Transfers ==
=== In ===
Date	Pos.	Player	From	Fee	Ref.
24 June 2024	CB	Charlie Barker (ENG)	Wealdstone (ENG)	Undisclosed	
28 June 2024	LB	Scott Malone (ENG)	Gillingham (ENG)	Undisclosed	
1 July 2024 (Note: The transfer was announced on 27 June, and would become official on 1 July once his FC Volendam contract expired)	CB	Josh Flint (ENG)	FC Volendam (NED)	Free	
1 July 2024 (Note: The transfer was announced on 28 June, and would become official on 1 July once his Swindon Town contract expired)	CF	Rushian Hepburn-Murphy (ENG)	Swindon Town (ENG)	Free	
1 July 2024 (Note: The transfer was announced on 20 June, and would become official on 1 July once his Welling United contract expired)	CM	Antony Papadopoulos (ENG)	Welling United (ENG)	Free	
9 July 2024	AM	Gavan Holohan (IRL)	Grimsby Town (ENG)	Free	
9 July 2024	CB	Toby Mullarkey (ENG)	Grimsby Town (ENG)	Undisclosed	
15 July 2024	GK	Jasper Sheik (ENG)	Aldershot Town (ENG)	Free	
18 July 2024	GK	Jojo Wollacott (GHA)	Hibernian (SCO)	Undisclosed	
22 July 2024	CF	Muhammadu Faal (ENG)	Havant & Waterlooville (ENG)	Free	
24 July 2024	AM	Max Anderson (SCO)	Dundee (SCO)	Undisclosed	
25 July 2024	AM	Junior Quitirna (GNB)	Fleetwood Town (ENG)	Undisclosed	
6 August 2024	CM	Panutche Camará (GNB)	Ipswich Town (ENG)	Free	
15 August 2024	CF	Tola Showunmi (ENG)	Louisville City (USA)	Undisclosed	
30 August 2024	CF	Will Swan (ENG)	Mansfield Town (ENG)	Undisclosed	
2 September 2024	CB	Benjamin Tanimu (NGA)	Singida Black Stars (TAN)	Undisclosed	
18 October 2024	CF	Tyreece John-Jules (ENG)	Arsenal (ENG)	Free	
3 January 2025	CB	Ben Radcliffe (ENG)	Derby County (ENG)	Undisclosed	
28 January 2025	RB	Rory Feely (IRL)	Barrow (ENG)	Undisclosed	
3 February 2025	DM	Liam Fraser (CAN)	FC Dallas (USA)	Free	
21 February 2025	CM	Louie Watson (IRL)	Luton Town (ENG)	Free	

=== Out ===
Date	Pos.	Player	To	Fee	Ref.
26 June 2024	CF	Danilo Orsi (ENG)	Burton Albion (ENG)	Undisclosed	
27 June 2024	GK	Corey Addai (JAM)	Stockport County (ENG)	Undisclosed	
28 June 2024	CM	Klaidi Lolos (GRE)	Bolton Wanderers (ENG)	Undisclosed	
4 July 2024	CM	Liam Kelly (IRL)	Milton Keynes Dons (ENG)	Undisclosed	
9 January 2025	DM	Jay Williams (SKN)	Milton Keynes Dons (ENG)	Undisclosed	
31 January 2025	AM	Ronan Darcy (ENG)	Wigan Athletic (ENG)	Undisclosed	
3 February 2025	CM	Rafiq Khaleel (MAR)	Dagenham & Redbridge (ENG)	Undisclosed	

=== Loaned in ===
Date	Pos.	Player	From	Date until	Ref.
10 July 2024	LW	Michael Dacosta Gonzalez (ESP)	Bournemouth (ENG)	3 September 2024 (Note: Loan was terminated early due to injury)	
31 July 2024	CM	Cam Bragg (ENG)	Southampton (ENG)	3 January 2025 (Note: On 3 January, Bragg was recalled to Southampton)	
9 August 2024	GK	Eddie Beach (WAL)	Chelsea (ENG)	14 January 2025 (Note: On 14 January, Beach was recalled to his parent club Chelsea)	
31 August 2024	DM	Bradley Ibrahim (ENG)	Hertha BSC (GER)	End of Season	
7 October 2024	GK	Connal Trueman (ENG)	Millwall (ENG)	14 October 2024	
5 November 2024	GK	Connal Trueman (ENG)	Millwall (ENG)	18 November 2024 (Note: On 11 November, Trueman's loan from Millwall was extended by a further seven days)	
27 January 2025	AM	Kamari Doyle (ENG)	Brighton & Hove Albion (ENG)	End of Season	
28 January 2025	GK	Matthew Cox (ENG)	Brentford (ENG)	End of Season	
21 March 2025	GK	Thimothée Lo-Tutala (FRA)	Hull City (ENG)	28 March 2025	
11 April 2025	GK	Luke Hutchinson (ENG)	Bolton Wanderers (ENG)	18 April 2025	
17 April 2025	GK	Toby Steward (ENG)	Portsmouth (ENG)	24 April 2025	

=== Loaned out ===
Date	Pos.	Player	To	Date until	Ref.
20 September 2024	GK	Jasper Sheik (ENG)	Whitehawk (ENG)	8 October 2024 (Note: On 8 October, Sheik was recalled early from his loan at Whitehawk due to injuries in the goalkeeping department)	
5 February 2025	CM	Jack Roles (CYP)	Gateshead (ENG)	End of Season	

=== Released / Out of Contract ===
Date	Pos.	Player	Subsequent club	Join date	Ref.
30 June 2024	LW	Adam Campbell (ENG)	Hartlepool United (ENG)	1 July 2024	
30 June 2024	CF	Jayden Davis (ENG)	Eastbourne Borough (ENG)	1 July 2024	
30 June 2024	GK	Roshan Greensall (ENG)	Sutton Common Rovers (ENG)	1 July 2024	
30 June 2024	CB	Harry Ransom (ENG)	Sutton United (ENG)	1 July 2024	
30 June 2024	LM	Nick Tsaroulla (CYP)	Notts County (ENG)	1 July 2024	
30 June 2024	CB	Will Wright (ENG)	Swindon Town (ENG)	1 July 2024	
30 June 2024	RM	Kellan Gordon (ENG)	Notts County (ENG)	12 July 2024	
30 June 2024	DM	Florian Kastrati (ENG)	Carshalton Athletic (ENG)	19 October 2024	
30 June 2024	LW	Jed Brown (ENG)			
30 June 2024	CB	Travis Johnson (ENG)			
30 June 2024	CB	Tobi Omole (ENG)			
6 July 2024	CM	Ben Gladwin (ENG)	Retired		
10 November 2024	LB	Scott Malone (ENG)	Cambridge United (ENG)	4 March 2025	

== Pre-season and friendlies ==
On 3 June, Crawley Town announced four pre-season friendlies, against Lewes, East Grinstead Town, Wealdstone and Aldershot Town. Over two weeks later, a fifth friendly was confirmed against Ebbsfleet United. A home friendly against Crystal Palace was also later added.

Win	Draw	Loss

Date	Time	Opponent	Venue	Result F–A	Scorers	Attendance	Ref.
16 July 2024	19:45	Lewes	Away	2–0	Darcy 44', Trialist		
20 July 2024	15:00	East Grinstead Town	Away	2–0	Williams 18', Trialist 49'		
23 July 2024	19:45	Wealdstone	Away	0–1			
27 July 2024	12:30	Crystal Palace	Home	3–6	Hepburn-Murphy 50', 60', Roles 73'	5,002	
30 July 2024	19:45	Aldershot Town	Away	2–1	Hepburn-Murphy 11', Darcy 55'		
3 August 2024	15:00	Ebbsfleet United	Away	1–1	Forster 71'	885	

== Competitions ==
=== League One ===
==== League table ====
Pos	Team	Pld	W	D	L	GF	GA	GD	Pts	Promotion, qualification or relegation
19	Northampton Town	46	12	15	19	48	66	−18	51	
20	Burton Albion	46	11	14	21	49	66	−17	47	
21	Crawley Town (R)	46	12	10	24	57	83	−26	46	Relegation to EFL League Two
22	Bristol Rovers (R)	46	12	7	27	44	76	−32	43	Relegation to EFL League Two
23	Cambridge United (R)	46	9	11	26	45	73	−28	38	Relegation to EFL League Two

Source: EFL Official Website
Rules for classification: 1) Points; 2) Goal difference; 3) Number of goals scored; 4) Head-to-head results; 5) Wins; 6) Away goals; 7) Penalty points (sec 9.5); 8) 12-point sending off offences
(R) Relegated

==== Results summary ====
Overall								Home						Away					
Pld	W	D	L	GF	GA	GD	Pts	W	D	L	GF	GA	GD	W	D	L	GF	GA	GD
45	11	10	24	55	82	−27	43	7	6	10	31	35	−4	4	4	14	24	47	−23

Last updated: 26 April 2025.
Source: Soccerway

==== Matches ====
On 26 June, the League One fixtures were announced.

Win	Draw	Loss

League One match details
Date	Time	Opponent	Venue	Result F–A	Scorers	Attendance	League position	Ref.
10 August 2024	17:30	Blackpool	Home	2–1	Hepburn-Murphy 16', Quitirna 33'	4,718	7th	
17 August 2024	15:00	Cambridge United	Away	1–0	Adeyemo 86'	6,720	3rd	
24 August 2024	15:00	Wigan Athletic	Away	0–1		8,432	8th	
31 August 2024	15:00	Barnsley	Home	0–3		4,704	12th	
14 September 2024	15:00	Stockport County	Home	1–1	Quitirna 68' pen.	4,538	12th	
21 September 2024	15:00	Wrexham	Away	1–2	Quitirna 54'	12,732	17th	
28 September 2024	12:30 (Note: Fixture was initially scheduled for a 15:00 kick-off, but was moved for live Sky Sports broadcast.)	Bolton Wanderers	Home	0–2		4,696	20th	
1 October 2024	19:45	Mansfield Town	Home	0–2		3,351	21st	
5 October 2024	15:00	Wycombe Wanderers	Away	0–1		4,472	21st	
12 October 2024	15:00	Shrewsbury Town	Home	3–5	Swan 33', Quitirna 62', Kelly 90+5'	4,215	22nd	
19 October 2024	12:30 (Note: Fixture was initially scheduled for a 15:00 kick-off, but was moved for live Sky Sports broadcast.)	Reading	Away	1–4	Forster 30'	13,243	22nd	
22 October 2024	19:45	Lincoln City	Home	3–0	Swan 46', Darcy 73', Hepburn-Murphy 90+5'	3,221	21st	
26 October 2024	15:00	Northampton Town	Away	0–3		6,445	22nd	
5 November 2024 (Note: Fixture was originally scheduled for 7 September, but was postponed due to international call-ups in the Burton squad.)	19:45	Burton Albion	Away	0–0		1,810	21st	
9 November 2024	15:00	Huddersfield Town	Home	2–2	Hepburn-Murphy 42', Anderson 65'	4,752	21st	
16 November 2024	15:00	Bristol Rovers	Away	0–0		7,411	21st	
23 November 2024	15:00	Rotherham United	Home	1–0	Swan 21'	3,631	20th	
3 December 2024	19:45	Charlton Athletic	Away	2–1	Showunmi 33', Anderson 80'	11,427	19th	
14 December 2024	15:00	Peterborough United	Away	3–4	Adeyemo 38', Swan 53', Showunmi 55'	7,874	21st	
23 December 2024 (Note: Fixture was initially scheduled for 21 December, but was moved for live Sky Sports broadcast.)	20:00	Birmingham City	Home	0–1		5,530	21st	
26 December 2024	13:00 (Note: Fixture was initially scheduled for a 15:00 kick-off, but was moved for live Sky Sports broadcast.)	Leyton Orient	Away	0–3		8,195	21st	
29 December 2024	15:00	Exeter City	Away	4–4	Camará 15', Swan 37', Showunmi 42', Quitirna 45+1'	6,805	21st	
4 January 2025	15:00	Barnsley	Away	0–3		11,016	21st	
18 January 2025	15:00	Burton Albion	Home	1–1	Showunmi 72'	3,521	21st	
25 January 2025	15:00	Stockport County	Away	0–2		8,960	23rd	
28 January 2025	19:45	Mansfield Town	Away	1–0	Adeyemo 81'	6,836	22nd	
1 February 2025	15:00	Wrexham	Home	1–2	Ibrahim 90'	5,049	22nd	
8 February 2025	15:00	Bolton Wanderers	Away	3–4	Hepburn-Murphy 50', 62', Swan 54'	20,384	23rd	
11 February 2025 (Note: Fixture was originally scheduled for 7 December, but was postponed due to Storm Darragh.)	19:45	Stevenage	Home	3–1	Forster 50', Quitirna 87', Doyle 90+4'	3,220	21st	
15 February 2025	15:00	Wycombe Wanderers	Home	1–1	Swan 5'	4,330	21st	
18 February 2025 (Note: Fixture was initially scheduled for 11 January, but was rearranged due to Wigan's FA Cup involvements.)	19:45	Wigan Athletic	Home	1–1	Barker 42'	3,733	22nd	
22 February 2025	15:00	Blackpool	Away	1–3	Doyle 30'	9,281	22nd	
1 March 2025	15:00	Cambridge United	Home	0–2		4,955	23rd	
4 March 2025	19:45	Lincoln City	Away	1–4	Doyle 6'	7,253	23rd	
8 March 2025	15:00	Reading	Home	1–1	Camará 90'	4,526	22nd	
11 March 2025 (Note: Fixture was originally scheduled for 1 January, but was postponed due to a waterlogged pitch.)	19:45	Charlton Athletic	Home	0–1		5,489	22nd	
15 March 2025	15:00	Huddersfield Town	Away	1–5	Adeyemo 90+6'	18,516	22nd	
22 March 2025	15:00	Bristol Rovers	Home	1–0	Doyle 19'	4,421	22nd	
29 March 2025	15:00	Rotherham United	Away	4–0	Doyle 23', 52', Holohan 84', Camará 87'	8,177	22nd	
1 April 2025	19:45	Peterborough United	Home	3–4	Quitirna 12', Kelly 33', Hepburn-Murphy 49'	4,111	22nd	
5 April 2025	15:00	Stevenage	Away	1–3	Ibrahim 70'	4,403	22nd	
12 April 2025	15:00	Leyton Orient	Home	1–3	Quitirna 49' pen.	4,793	22nd	
18 April 2025	15:00	Birmingham City	Away	0–0		27,325	23rd	
21 April 2025	15:00	Exeter City	Home	3–1	Hepburn-Murphy 7', 23', Camará 9'	4,441	22nd	
26 April 2025	15:00	Northampton Town	Home	3–0	Hepburn-Murphy 39', Kelly 66', Doyle 88'	5,105	21st	
3 May 2025	15:00	Shrewsbury Town	Away	2–1	Hepburn-Murphy 50' pen., Anderson 60'	5,599	21st	

=== FA Cup ===
Crawley Town were drawn away to Maidenhead United in the first round and at home to Lincoln City in the second round.

Win	Draw	Loss

FA Cup match details
Round	Date	Time	Opponent	Venue	Result F–A	Scorers	Attendance	Ref.
First round	2 November 2024	15:00	Maidenhead United	Away	2–1 (a.e.t.)	Mullarkey 90+5', Showunmi 116'	1,814	
Second round	30 November 2024	15:00	Lincoln City	Home	3–4	Roles 10', Showunmi 13', Kelly 82'	2,831	

=== EFL Cup ===
On 27 June, the draw for the first round was made, with Crawley being drawn at home against Swindon Town. In the second round, they were drawn away to Brighton & Hove Albion.

Win	Draw	Loss

EFL Cup match details
Round	Date	Time	Opponent	Venue	Result F–A	Scorers	Attendance	Ref.
First round	13 August 2024	19:45	Swindon Town	Home	4–2	Adeyemo 34', Roles 56', 88', Khaleel 89'	2,396	
Second round	27 August 2024	19:45	Brighton & Hove Albion	Away	0–4		19,175	

=== EFL Trophy ===
In the group stage, Crawley were drawn into Southern Group B alongside AFC Wimbledon, Wycombe Wanderers and Brighton & Hove Albion U21.

Pos	Div	Team	Pld	W	PW	PL	L	GF	GA	GD	Pts	Qualification
1	L1	Wycombe Wanderers	3	2	0	0	1	7	5	+2	6	Advance to Round 2
2	L2	AFC Wimbledon	3	2	0	0	1	5	6	−1	6	Advance to Round 2
3	ACA	Brighton & Hove Albion U21	3	1	0	1	1	8	7	+1	4	
4	L1	Crawley Town	3	0	1	0	2	6	8	−2	2	

Source: EFL

EFL Trophy match details
Round	Date	Time	Opponent	Venue	Result F–A	Scorers	Attendance	Ref.
Group stage	20 August 2024	19:45	Brighton & Hove Albion U21	Home	2–2 (4–3 p)	Barker 13', Papadopoulos 55'	1,545	
Group stage	8 October 2024	19:45	AFC Wimbledon	Home	3–4	Darcy 71' pen., Hepburn-Murphy 80', Flint 87'	1,438	
Group stage	12 November 2024	19:00	Wycombe Wanderers	Away	1–2	Showunmi 14'	723	

== Statistics ==
=== Appearances and goals ===
Players with no appearances are not included on the list
Italics indicate a loaned in player

No.	Pos	Nat	Player	Total		League One		FA Cup		EFL Cup		EFL Trophy	
No.	Pos	Nat	Player	Apps	Goals	Apps	Goals	Apps	Goals	Apps	Goals	Apps	Goals
1	GK	(Ghana) GHA	Jojo Wollacott	36	0	33+0	0	1+0	0	2+0	0	0+0	0
2	DF	(Republic of Ireland) IRL	Rory Feely	7	0	2+5	0	0+0	0	0+0	0	0+0	0
3	DF	(England) ENG	Dion Conroy	21	0	21+0	0	0+0	0	0+0	0	0+0	0
5	DF	(England) ENG	Charlie Barker	45	2	37+2	1	1+0	0	0+2	0	3+0	1
6	MF	(Scotland) SCO	Max Anderson	45	3	32+7	3	0+2	0	2+0	0	1+1	0
7	MF	(England) ENG	Harry Forster	26	2	16+9	2	0+1	0	0+0	0	0+0	0
8	MF	(Republic of Ireland) IRL	Gavan Holohan	23	1	4+16	1	1+1	0	0+0	0	1+0	0
9	FW	(England) ENG	Will Swan	40	7	31+6	7	0+1	0	0+0	0	0+2	0
10	MF	(Canada) CAN	Liam Fraser	16	0	15+1	0	0+0	0	0+0	0	0+0	0
11	MF	(Cyprus) CYP	Jack Roles	27	3	5+15	0	2+0	1	1+1	2	3+0	0
12	MF	(Guinea-Bissau) GBS	Panutche Camará	47	4	28+14	4	1+0	0	1+1	0	1+1	0
14	FW	(England) ENG	Rushian Hepburn-Murphy	46	11	27+15	10	1+0	0	1+0	0	1+1	1
15	FW	(Wales) WAL	Sonny Fish	3	0	0+1	0	0+1	0	0+0	0	1+0	0
16	GK	(England) ENG	Matthew Cox	3	0	3+0	0	0+0	0	0+0	0	0+0	0
17	DF	(Nigeria) NGR	Benjamin Tanimu	10	0	1+6	0	2+0	0	0+0	0	1+0	0
18	MF	(Guinea-Bissau) GBS	Junior Quitirna	38	8	21+13	8	0+0	0	1+1	0	0+2	0
19	FW	(United States) USA	Jeremy Kelly	44	4	32+5	3	2+0	1	2+0	0	1+2	0
20	DF	(England) ENG	Joy Mukena	25	0	16+3	0	2+0	0	2+0	0	2+0	0
21	GK	(England) ENG	Jasper Sheik	1	0	0+0	0	0+1	0	0+0	0	0+0	0
22	FW	(England) ENG	Ade Adeyemo	35	5	11+18	4	1+1	0	1+1	1	2+0	0
23	MF	(England) ENG	Bradley Ibrahim	37	2	24+9	2	1+1	0	0+0	0	0+2	0
24	DF	(England) ENG	Toby Mullarkey	37	1	31+0	0	2+0	1	2+0	0	2+0	0
25	MF	(England) ENG	Antony Papadopoulos	7	1	0+5	0	0+0	0	0+1	0	1+0	1
26	MF	(England) ENG	Kamari Doyle	21	7	15+6	7	0+0	0	0+0	0	0+0	0
27	MF	(Republic of Ireland) IRL	Louie Watson	7	0	4+3	0	0+0	0	0+0	0	0+0	0
28	DF	(England) ENG	Josh Flint	20	1	15+1	0	0+0	0	2+0	0	2+0	1
29	FW	(England) ENG	Tola Showunmi	28	7	10+14	4	2+0	2	0+0	0	2+0	1
30	DF	(England) ENG	Ben Radcliffe	19	0	16+3	0	0+0	0	0+0	0	0+0	0
32	GK	(England) ENG	Toby Steward	4	0	4+0	0	0+0	0	0+0	0	0+0	0
45	FW	(England) ENG	Tyreece John-Jules	27	0	10+15	0	1+0	0	0+0	0	0+1	0
Player(s) who featured whilst on loan but returned to parent club during the season:
4	MF	(England) ENG	Cam Bragg	12	0	2+4	0	1+0	0	2+0	0	3+0	0
16	GK	(Wales) WAL	Eddie Beach	2	0	0+0	0	1+0	0	0+0	0	1+0	0
31	GK	(England) ENG	Connal Trueman	6	0	4+0	0	0+0	0	0+0	0	2+0	0
32	GK	(England) ENG	Luke Hutchinson	1	0	1+0	0	0+0	0	0+0	0	0+0	0
32	GK	(France) FRA	Thimothée Lo-Tutala	1	0	1+0	0	0+0	0	0+0	0	0+0	0
Player(s) who featured but departed permanently during the season:
10	MF	(England) ENG	Ronan Darcy	25	2	19+2	1	0+0	0	1+1	0	0+2	1
26	MF	(Saint Kitts and Nevis) SKN	Jay Williams	13	0	12+0	0	0+0	0	1+0	0	0+0	0
27	MF	(Morocco) MAR	Rafiq Khaleel	7	1	0+1	0	0+1	0	1+1	1	3+0	0
33	DF	(England) ENG	Scott Malone	3	0	2+0	0	0+0	0	0+1	0	0+0	0
