= Benjamin Tanimu =

Nigerian footballer (born 2002)

Personal information
- Date of birth: 24 July 2002 (age 24)
- Place of birth: Benin City, Nigeria
- Height: 1.83 m (6 ft 0 in)
- Position: Centre-back

Team information
- Current team: Maghreb of Fez
- Number: 28

Senior career*
Years	Team	Apps	(Gls)
2018–2024	Bendel Insurance		
2024	Singida Black Stars (Note: The club was known as Ihefu FC when Tanimu signed for the club.)	11	(0)
2024–2025	Crawley Town	7	(0)
2025–	Maghreb of Fez	0	(0)

International career^{‡}
- Nigeria U23
2024–	Nigeria	3	(0)
- * Club domestic league appearances and goals as of 22:33, 28 January 2025 (UTC) ‡ National team caps and goals as of 16:41, 30 August 2024 (UTC)

Benjamin Tanimu (born 24 July 2002) is a Nigerian professional footballer who plays as a centre-back for Botola Pro club Maghreb of Fez and the Nigeria national team.

== Club career ==
Born in Benin City, Tanimu started his career in his home city at Bendel Insurance in 2018. After seven seasons, he signed for Tanzanian Premier League side Ihefu FC, later known as Singida Black Stars, in February 2024.

On 2 September 2024, Tanimu joined EFL League One club Crawley Town on a two-year contract for a fee of 2.3 billion TZS (~£630,000 GBP), linking up with the club in the weeks following the move. On 19 October 2024, he made his debut for the club as a late substitute in a 4–1 defeat to Reading.

On 4 July 2025, Tanimu joined Moroccan club Maghreb of Fez for an undisclosed fee.

== International career ==
Tanimu has previously represented Nigeria at under-23 level.

Tanimu was called up to the Nigeria national team for the first time in March 2024 for friendlies against Ghana and Mali. He made his debut for Nigeria on 22 March, starting in a 2–1 win over Ghana.

== Career statistics ==
=== Club ===
As of match played 4 March 2025

Appearances and goals by club, season and competition
Club	Season	League			National cup		League cup		Other		Total	
Club	Season	Division	Apps	Goals	Apps	Goals	Apps	Goals	Apps	Goals	Apps	Goals
Bendel Insurance	2018	Nigeria National League	No data currently available									
Bendel Insurance	2019	Nigeria Professional League	15	0	0	0	—		0	0	15	0
Bendel Insurance	2019–20	Nigeria National League	No data currently available									
Bendel Insurance	2020–21	Nigeria National League	No data currently available									
Bendel Insurance	2021–22	Nigeria National League	No data currently available									
Bendel Insurance	2022–23	Nigeria Professional League	21	0	0	0	—		0	0	21	0
Bendel Insurance	2023–24	Nigeria Premier League	19	2	0	0	—		4 (Note: Appearances in CAF Confederations Cup)	0	23	2
Ihefu	2023–24	Tanzanian Premier League	11	0	0	0	—		0	0	11	0
Crawley Town	2024–25	League One	7	0	2	0	0	0	1 (Note: Appearance in EFL Trophy)	0	10	0
Career total			73	2	2	0	0	0	5	0	80	2

As of match played 10 June 2024

Appearances and goals by national team and year
National team	Year	Apps	Goals
Nigeria	2024	3	0
Total		3	0

== Honours ==
Bendel Insurance

- Nigeria National League: 2021–22
- Nigeria Federation Cup: 2023
