= Kamari Doyle =

English footballer (born 2005)

Personal information
- Full name: Kamari Olivier Newby Doyle
- Date of birth: 1 August 2005 (age 21)
- Place of birth: Bristol, England
- Height: 1.82 m (6 ft 0 in)
- Position: Midfielder

Team information
- Current team: Leicester City (on loan from Brighton & Hove Albion)
- Number: 27

Youth career
- 2013–2023: Southampton
- 2024: Brighton & Hove Albion

Senior career*
Years	Team	Apps	(Gls)
2023–2024	Southampton	1	(0)
2024–	Brighton & Hove Albion	0	(0)
2024–2025	→ Exeter City (loan)	20	(3)
2025	→ Crawley Town (loan)	21	(7)
2025–2026	→ Reading (loan)	41	(4)
2026–	→ Leicester City (loan)	8	(2)

International career^{‡}
2022	England U17	3	(1)
2023	England U18	3	(0)
2023	England U19	2	(0)
2024	England U20	2	(0)
- * Club domestic league appearances and goals as of 21 November 2026 ‡ National team caps and goals as of 13:36, 12 December 2024 (UTC)

Kamari Olivier Newby Doyle (born 1 August 2005) is an English professional footballer who plays as a central or attacking midfielder for EFL League One club Leicester City, on loan from Premier League club Brighton & Hove Albion.

== Early life ==
Doyle was born to an English mother and a Jamaican father. Doyle trained with Southampton staff in Bath, Somerset from the age of seven. He would later travel down from Bristol with his grandfather to attend Southampton academy sessions.

== Career ==
=== Southampton ===
Doyle played as a sixteen year-old for Southampton in the EFL Trophy away against Charlton Athletic on 5 October 2021. During the season Doyle signed a pre-contract agreement that his first professional contract with Southampton that would come into effect upon his seventeenth birthday. Doyle and Southampton won the Under-18 Premier League South in 2021–22.

During the 2022–23 season, Doyle played as Saints B won the Premier League 2 Division 2, it was the second consecutive youth league win for Doyle. He also featured prominently as the Southampton under-18 team reached the semi-finals of the 2022–23 FA Youth Cup.

On the penultimate week of the season he was one of three academy players promoted to train with the first team squad for the Premier League clash against Brighton & Hove Albion on 21 May 2023. Doyle was subsequently named in the match day squad and appeared in the second half as a substitute for his senior professional debut.

=== Brighton & Hove Albion ===
On 26 January 2024, he joined the youth academy of Premier League club Brighton & Hove Albion for an undisclosed fee.

==== Loans ====
On 16 August 2024, Doyle joined League One side Exeter City on a season-long loan deal. He registered his first senior goal on 31 August 2024, scoring directly from a free kick during a 2–0 away win against Bolton Wanderers.

On 27 January 2025, Doyle was recalled from his loan at Exeter, and loaned to fellow League One club Crawley Town. He scored his first goal for the club on 11 February 2025 in a 3–1 victory against Stevenage.

On 4 August 2025, Doyle joined League One side Reading on a season-long loan deal.

On 1 September 2026, Doyle joined League One side Leicester City on a season-long loan deal.

== Style of play ==
Considered a two-footed player, who can receive and pass with either foot as well as strike free-kicks with either foot, it has been reported that Doyle has been mentored to a degree by James Ward-Prowse at Southampton. He has played for Southampton, England U-20s, Exeter City (on loan), and Crawley Town (on loan) in a wide range of central and attacking midfield positions, including the number 10 role.

== International career ==
An England youth international, Doyle scored his first goal for the England U17s against Norway in June 2022.

On 6 September 2023, Doyle made his England U19 debut during a 1–0 defeat to Germany in Oliva.

On 15 November 2024, Doyle made his England U20 debut as a substitute during a 4-0 win over Germany at Chesterfield.

== Career statistics ==
=== Club ===
As of match played 21 November 2026

Appearances and goals by club, season and competition
Club	Season	League			FA Cup		League Cup		Other		Total	
Club	Season	Division	Apps	Goals	Apps	Goals	Apps	Goals	Apps	Goals	Apps	Goals
Southampton	2022–23	Premier League	1	0	0	0	0	0	–		1	0
Southampton	2023–24	Championship	0	0	0	0	1	0	—		1	0
Southampton	Total		1	0	0	0	1	0	—		2	0
Brighton and Hove Albion	2023–24	Premier League	0	0	0	0	–		–		0	0
Brighton & Hove Albion U21s	2026–27	—							1 (Note: Appearance(s) in the EFL Trophy)	1	1	1
Exeter City (loan)	2024–25	League One	20	3	2	1	–		2	0	24	4
Crawley Town (loan)	2024–25	League One	21	7	–		–		–		21	7
Reading (loan)	2025–26	League One	41	4	1	0	3	0	1	0	46	4
Leicester City (loan)	2026–27	League One	8	2	1	1	0	0	3	0	12	3
Career total			91	16	4	2	4	0	7	1	106	19
