= Jasper Sheik =

English association football player

Personal information
- Date of birth: 27 February 2005 (age 21)
- Place of birth: Haywards Heath, England
- Height: 1.82 m (6 ft 0 in)
- Position: Goalkeeper

Team information
- Current team: South Shields
- Number: 1

Youth career
- Charlton Athletic
- 2020–2022: Woking

Senior career*
Years	Team	Apps	(Gls)
2022–2024	Aldershot Town	1	(0)
2022	→ Broadbridge Heath (dual-reg.)	8	(0)
2023	→ Roffey (dual-reg.)	12	(0)
2023	→ Winchester City (dual-reg.)	4	(0)
2023–2024	→ Three Bridges (dual-reg.)	23	(0)
2024–2025	Crawley Town	1	(0)
2024–2025	→ Whitehawk (loan)	7	(0)
2025–	South Shields	42	(0)
- * Club domestic league appearances and goals as of 31 August 2026 (UTC)

Jasper Sheik (born 27 February 2005) is an English professional footballer who plays as a goalkeeper for South Shields.

== Career ==
Sheik started his career at Charlton Athletic before joining Woking in 2020 and subsequently signed for their local rivals, Aldershot Town two years later. During the 2022–23 season he was also selected as the number one for England Schoolboys FA & represented his country making three appearances.

He went onto dual-register with Broadbridge Heath, Roffey, Winchester City and Three Bridges before making his first-team debut for the Hampshire-based side during a 4–2 away defeat to Kidderminster Harriers in January 2024. On 25 April 2024, it was announced that Sheik would be leaving Aldershot at the end of his contract in June.

On 15 July 2024, Sheik joined League One side, Crawley Town on a one-year deal following his release from Aldershot. He then proceeded to join Whitehawk on a season-long loan in September for the campaign, however, was recalled after just one appearance following an injury crisis at his parent club, Crawley. On 2 November 2024, he made his debut for the club, replacing Jojo Wollacott in the 49th minute of an FA Cup first round tie victory against Maidenhead United.

On 12 May 2025, Crawley announced he would be leaving the club in June when his contract expired.

On 30 June 2025, Sheik signed for National League North side South Shields. Sheik kept four consecutive clean sheets in South Shields’ opening four league matches of the 2025–26 season. He suffered a shoulder injury during a 1–1 home draw against King's Lynn Town on 8 November 2025. With the club subsequently announcing that he required surgery. He returned to league action on 3 April 2026 as a half-time substitute against Spennymoor Town. In May 2026, South Shields exercised an option to extend his contract.

== International career ==
In 2023, Sheik was selected to represent the England U18 Schoolboys team.

== Career statistics ==
As of As of match played 11 August 2026

Appearances and goals by club, season and competition
Club	Season	League			FA Cup		EFL Cup		Other		Total	
Club	Season	Division	Apps	Goals	Apps	Goals	Apps	Goals	Apps	Goals	Apps	Goals
Aldershot Town	2022–23	National League	0	0	0	0	—		0	0	0	0
Aldershot Town	2023–24	National League	1	0	0	0	—		0	0	1	0
Aldershot Town	Total		1	0	0	0	—		0	0	1	0
Broadbridge Heath (dual-reg.)	2022–23	Southern Combination League Premier Division	8	0	0	0	—		0	0	8	0
Roffey (dual-reg.)	2022–23	Southern Combination League Premier Division	12	0	—		—		—		12	0
Winchester City (dual-reg.)	2023–24	Southern League Premier Division South	4	0	0	0	—		0	0	4	0
Three Bridges (dual-reg.)	2023–24	Isthmian League South East Division	23	0	—		—		0	0	23	0
Crawley Town	2024–25	EFL League One	0	0	1	0	0	0	0	0	1	0
Whitehawk (loan)	2024–25	Isthmian League Premier Division	7	0	0	0	—		0	0	7	0
South Shields	2025–26	National League North	21	0	4	0	—		0	0	25	0
South Shields	2026–27	National League North	14	0	3	0	—		0	0	17	0
Career total			90	0	8	0	0	0	0	0	98	0
