= Cameron Bragg =

English footballer

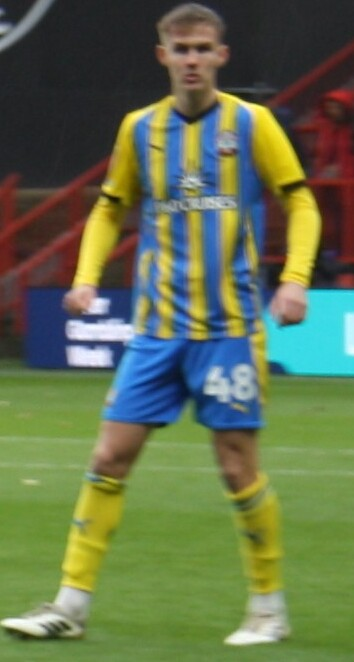
- Bragg with Southampton in 2025

Personal information
- Full name: Cameron Roger Bragg
- Date of birth: 28 October 2005 (age 21)
- Place of birth: Winchester, England
- Height: 5 ft 10 in (1.77 m)
- Position: Central midfielder

Team information
- Current team: Southampton
- Number: 26

Youth career
- 2013–: Southampton

Senior career*
Years	Team	Apps	(Gls)
2023–	Southampton	26	(1)
2024–2025	→ Crawley Town (loan)	6	(0)

International career^{‡}
2025–	Scotland U21	2	(0)
- * Club domestic league appearances and goals as of 15:38, 21 November 2026 (UTC) ‡ National team caps and goals as of 08:25, 2 May 2025 (UTC)

Cameron Roger Bragg (born 10 April 2005) is a professional footballer who plays as a central midfielder for EFL Championship club Southampton. Born in England, he has represented Scotland at youth level.

Bragg is a product of the Southampton academy and made his professional debut for the club in January 2024. He spent half of the 2024–25 season on loan at Crawley Town.

== Club career ==
Bragg joined the Southampton academy when he was eight years-old. He was part of the Southampton U18 side that won the Under-18 Premier League South in 2021–22, and reached the semi-final of the FA Youth Cup during the 2022–23 season. He signed his first professional contract with the club in July 2023.

During the 2023–24 season, Bragg began to be included in Southampton first-team match-day squads in the EFL Championship. He made his professional debut on 6 January 2024, in the FA Cup in a 4–0 victory against Walsall. After his debut game, manager Russell Martin praised him saying he was "really good when he came on" and "I like him as a young man and as a footballer. He's got such a good understanding, learns quickly, and asks questions. It was nice to get him on the pitch because he deserved that".

On 31 July 2024, Bragg signed a one-year contract extension with Southampton and joined Crawley Town on a season-long loan. He made his debut for the club on 10 August 2024 in a 2–1 victory against Blackpool. On 3 January 2025, Bragg was recalled from loan and returned to Southampton.

Due to Tom Fellows, Flynn Downes and Caspar Jander being ruled out through illness, Bragg was included in Southampton's first-team match-day squad against Blackburn Rovers on 25 October 2025, and he made his league debut after replacing Shea Charles in the 80th minute. On 11 December, Bragg signed a one-year contract extension. He scored his first professional goal for the club on 10 January 2026 in a 3–2 away victory against Doncaster Rovers in the FA Cup.

During a 1–0 victory against Portsmouth in the South Coast derby on 11 October 2026, Bragg received a red card following a second bookable offence for a foul on Ebou Adams. On 31 October, he scored his first league goal for the club in a 4–1 against Queens Park Rangers.

== International career ==
On 21 March 2025, Bragg made his international debut for Scotland under-21s as a half-time substitute in a 2–0 victory over Ireland.

== Style of play ==
A central midfielder, Bragg received an element of mentoring during his development in the role from Southampton first-team player Will Smallbone.

== Personal life ==
His brother Tom Bragg is also a footballer, who plays as a central defender, and made his debut for Eastleigh in January 2022.

== Career statistics ==
=== Club ===
As of match played 21 November 2026

Appearances and goals by club, season and competition
Club	Season	League			FA Cup		League Cup		Other		Total	
Club	Season	Division	Apps	Goals	Apps	Goals	Apps	Goals	Apps	Goals	Apps	Goals
Southampton	2023–24	Championship	0	0	2	0	0	0	—		2	0
Southampton	2024–25	Premier League	0	0	0	0	0	0	—		0	0
Southampton	2025–26	Championship	16	0	5	1	0	0	0	0	21	1
Southampton	2026–27	Championship	10	1	0	0	2	0	—		12	1
Southampton	Total		26	1	6	1	2	0	0	0	35	2
Crawley Town (loan)	2024–25	League One	6	0	4	0	2	0	3 (Note: Appearances in EFL Trophy)	0	12	0
Career total			32	1	8	1	4	0	3	0	47	2
