= Josh Flint =

English footballer (born 2000)

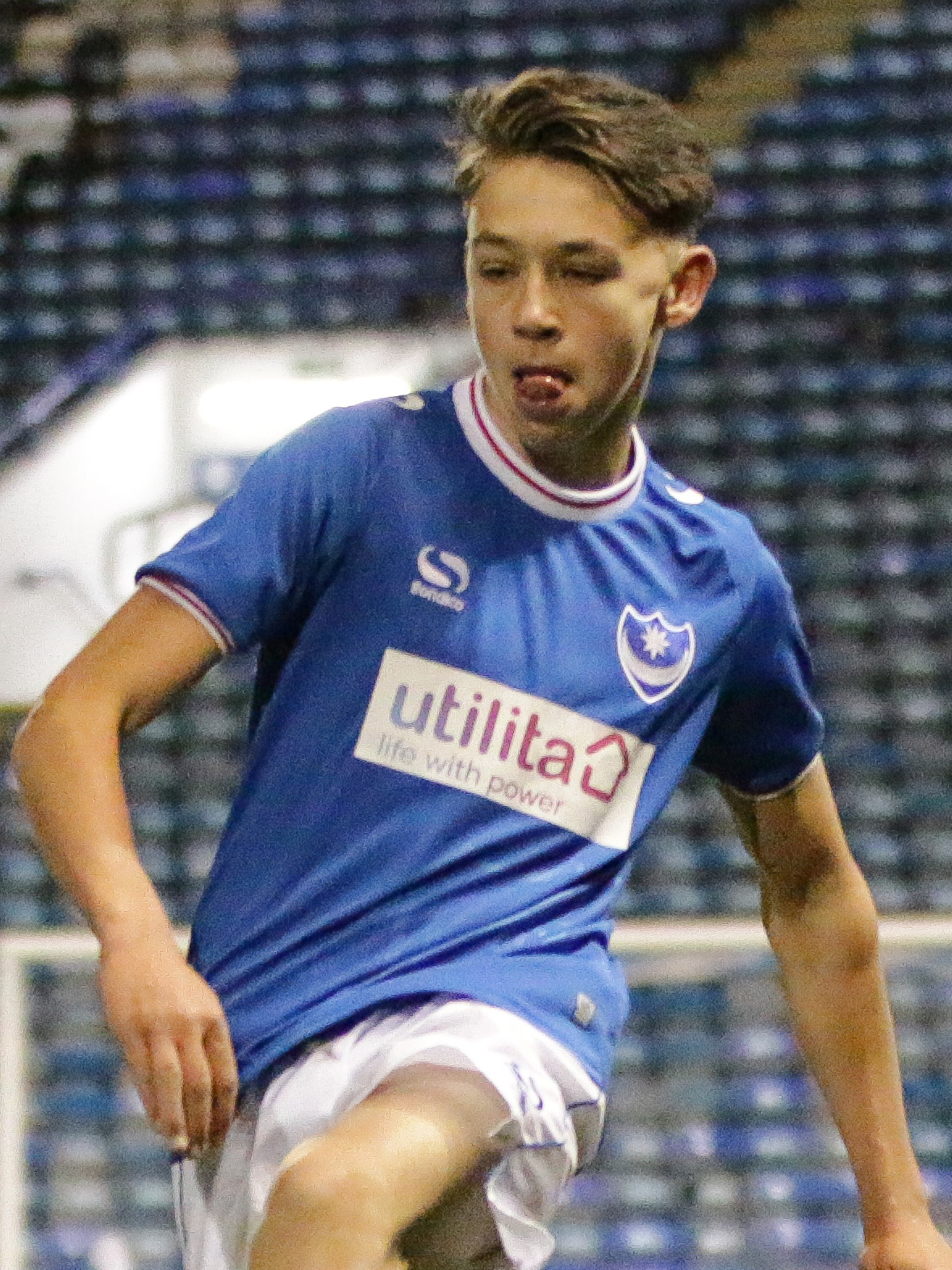
- Flint in 2017

Personal information
- Full name: Joshua Hughson Flint
- Date of birth: 13 October 2000 (age 26)
- Place of birth: Waterlooville, England
- Height: 6 ft 1 in (1.86 m)
- Position: Defender

Team information
- Current team: Crawley Town
- Number: 3

Youth career
- 2009–2019: Portsmouth

Senior career*
Years	Team	Apps	(Gls)
2019–2020	Portsmouth	0	(0)
2019–2020	→ Bognor Regis Town (loan)	6	(0)
2020	Bognor Regis Town	8	(0)
2020–2023	Jong Volendam	10	(1)
2020–2024	Volendam	57	(2)
2024–2026	Crawley Town	49	(1)
2026–	Crawley Town	0	(0)
- * Club domestic league appearances and goals as of 15:34, 28 October 2026 (UTC)

Joshua Hughson Flint (born 13 October 2000) is an English professional footballer who plays as a defender for EFL League Two club Crawley Town.

== Early life and education ==
Flint was born in Waterlooville and attended Queen's Inclosure Primary School in Cowplain and Crookhorn College. He was a childhood Portsmouth supporter, having held a season ticket at the club.

== Club career ==
=== Portsmouth ===
Flint joined Portsmouth aged 8 after playing for local side Widbrook United. Flint broke his arm in January 2019 and despite initially being told he would be released at the end of his scholarship in summer 2019, his scholarship was extended by a further year. He made his Portsmouth debut on 14 September 2019, starting and scoring in a 3–1 EFL Trophy win over Norwich City U21s. In October 2019, Flint joined Isthmian League side Bognor Regis Town before joining the side on a permanent deal in January 2020 following release by Portsmouth.

=== Volendam ===
On 13 September 2020, Flint joined Dutch side FC Volendam following a trial at the club, initially joining up with their reserve side in the Tweede Divisie on an amateur basis. On 23 November 2020, Flint made his first team debut for Volendam in the Eerste Divisie, coming on as a substitute in a 0–0 draw with Jong Ajax. On 3 October, he scored his first senior goal in a match for the reserve side Jong Volendam in a 3–1 away win over Excelsior Maassluis. On 16 December 2020, Flint signed a new contract with Volendam, keeping him at the club until 2023.

In March 2023, Volendam triggered a clause in Flint's contract that kept him at the club until summer 2024.

In March 2024, it was announced that Flint would be released by Volendam at the end of the season upon the expiry of his contract.

=== Crawley Town ===
On 27 June 2024, Crawley Town announced the signing of Flint on a two-year deal. Flint started Crawley's opening match of the 2024–25 season and was awarded the man of the match award as Crawley beat Blackpool 2–1. He was released at the end of the 2025–26 season.

On 28 October 2026, Flint re-signed for the club on a contract until the end of the season.

== Style of play ==
Flint is 6 ft 2in tall and left-footed. He started his career as an attacking midfielder at Portsmouth, but was retrained as a centre back at Volendam. Flint has been noted for his technical ability, with former Portsmouth manager Kenny Jackett stating that Flint was "probably technically the Academy's best player", whilst Crawley manager Scott Lindsey claimed that he signed Flint for "his ability to step in and play".

== Career statistics ==
As of match played 10 August 2024

Appearances and goals by club, season and competition
Club	Season	League			National cup (Note: Includes FA Cup, KNVB Cup)		League cup (Note: Includes EFL Cup)		Other		Total	
Club	Season	Division	Apps	Goals	Apps	Goals	Apps	Goals	Apps	Goals	Apps	Goals
Portsmouth	2019–20	League One	0	0	0	0	0	0	2 (Note: Appearances in EFL Trophy)	1	2	1
Bognor Regis Town	2019–20	Isthmian Premier Division	14	0	0	0	—		4 (Note: Three appearances in FA Trophy, 1 appearance in Sussex Senior Challenge Cup)	1	18	1
Jong Volendam	2020–21	Tweede Divisie	5	1	—		—		0	0	5	1
Jong Volendam	2021–22	Tweede Divisie	1	0	—		—		0	0	1	0
Jong Volendam	2022–23	Tweede Divisie	4	0	—		—		0	0	4	0
Jong Volendam	Total		10	1	0	0	0	0	0	0	10	1
Volendam	2020–21	Eerste Divisie	2	0	0	0	—		0	0	2	0
Volendam	2021–22	Eerste Divisie	15	1	0	0	—		0	0	15	1
Volendam	2022–23	Eredivisie	12	0	1	0	—		0	0	13	0
Volendam	2023–24	Eredivisie	28	1	1	0	—		0	0	29	1
Volendam	Total		57	2	2	0	0	0	0	0	59	2
Crawley Town	2024–25	League One	2	0	0	0	1	0	0	0	2	0
Career total			83	3	2	0	1	0	6	2	91	5
