= 2026–27 Crawley Town F.C. season =

131st season in existence of Crawley Town FC

Crawley Town
2026–27 season
- Owner: KB Sports and Leisure Ltd
- Chairman: Raphael Khalili
- Head coach: Kevin Blackwell (from 19 November); Kevin Blackwell (interim); Colin Kazim-Richards (until 20 October)
- Stadium: Broadfield Stadium

The 2026–27 season is the 131st season in the history of Crawley Town Football Club and their second consecutive season being in League Two. In addition to the domestic league, the club would also participate in the FA Cup, the EFL Cup, and the EFL Trophy.

== Managerial changes ==
Prior to the season starting Colin Kazim-Richards was appointed as the club's permanent head coach after guiding Crawley to safety from relegation in the preceding season. However, he was dismissed on 20 October, with the club bottom of the table and six points adrift of safety. Kevin Blackwell was appointed as interim manager on a short-term basis. A month later, Kevin was appointed manager until the end of the season.

== Transfers and contracts ==
=== In ===
Date	Pos.	Player	From	Fee	Ref.
1 July 2026 (Note: The transfer was announced on 18 June, and would become official on July 1 once Arganese-McDermott's contract at Tottenham Hotspur expired.)	CB	(Spain) Pele Arganese-McDermott	(England) Tottenham Hotspur	Free	
1 July 2026 (Note: The transfer was announced on 11 June, would become official on July 1 once Duke-McKenna's contract at Harrogate Town expired.)	RWB	(Guyana) Stephen Duke-McKenna	(England) Harrogate Town	Free	
1 July 2026 (Note: The transfer was announced on 19 June, would become official on July 1 once Farquharson's contract at Walsall expired.)	CB	(England) Priestley Farquharson	(England) Walsall	Free	
1 July 2026 (Note: The agreement was announced on 10 June, and would come into effect on July 1.)	GK	(Italy) Vito Mannone	Retired	Free (Note: Joins as a player-coach)	
3 July 2026	CM	(England) Jude Arthurs	(England) Bromley	Free	
10 July 2026	SS	(Italy) Gianmarco Di Biase	(Italy) Juventus	Undisclosed	
24 July 2026	RW	(England) Malcolm Ebiowei	Free agent	—N/a	
24 July 2026	CDM	(England) Klaudio Krasniqi	(Gibraltar) Glacis United	Free	
25 July 2026	GK	(England) Jackson Izquierdo	(England) Crystal Palace	Free	
28 July 2026	RB	(England) Omari Mrisho	(England) Huddersfield Town	Free	
28 August 2026	LW	(England) Dylan Morgan	(England) Torquay United	Undisclosed	
6 November 2026	CB	(England) Ben Heneghan	(England) Port Vale	Free	
10 November 2026	CM	(England) Ayman Benarous	(England) Plymouth Argyle	Free	
10 November 2026	CF	(England) Connor Wickham	(United Arab Emirates) Dubai City	Free	

=== Loaned in ===
Date	Pos.	Player	From	Until	Ref.
9 July 2026	CB	(England) Ty Ewens-Findlay	(England) Charlton Athletic	End of Season	
10 July 2026	CF	(England) Pemi Aderoju	(England) Peterborough United	End of Season	
1 August 2026	LW	(Sierra Leone) Osman Kamara	(England) Blackburn Rovers	End of Season	
1 August 2026	GK	(England) Nicholas Michalski	(England) Blackburn Rovers	End of Season	
1 August 2026	CM	(England) Nathan Tinsdale	(England) Hull City	End of Season	
17 August 2026	DM	(England) Kai Jennings	(England) Wimbledon	End of Season	

=== Loaned out ===
Date	Pos.	Player	To	Loaned until	Ref.
1 August 2026	CB	(England) Ben Radcliffe	(England) Yeovil Town	31 January 2027	
3 August 2026	CF	(England) Danny Cashman	(England) Boreham Wood	End of Season	
7 November 2026	CB	(Spain) Pele Arganese-McDermott	(England) Tonbridge Angels	7 December 2026	
20 November 2026	CDM	(England) Klaudio Krasniqi	(England) Walton & Hersham	20 December 2026	

=== Out ===
Date	Pos.	Player	To	Fee	Ref.
1 September 2026	CDM	(Saint Kitts and Nevis) Jay Williams	(England) Colchester United	Undisclosed	

=== Released / Out of Contract ===
Date	Pos.	Player	Subsequent club	Join date	Ref.
30 June 2026	CM	(England) Antony Papadopoulos	(England) Dagenham & Redbridge	1 July 2026	
30 June 2026	LM	(England) Harry Forster	(England) Dorking Wanderers	1 August 2026	
30 June 2026	CM	(Scotland) Max Anderson			
30 June 2026	CM	(England) Reece Brown			
30 June 2026	CF	(England) Louis Flower			
30 June 2026	GK	(England) Will Heater			
30 June 2026	LB	(England) Scott Malone	(England) Three Bridges	29 August 2026	
30 June 2026	CF	(England) Harry McKirdy			
30 June 2026	CM	(England) Taylor Richards			
30 June 2026	CB	(England) Theo Vassell			
30 June 2026	GK	(Ghana) Jojo Wollacott			
21 July 2026	CB	(England) Dion Conroy	Wealdstone	7 August 2026	

=== New Contract ===
Date	Pos.	Player	Contract expiry	Ref.
13 May 2026	RW	(England) Ade Adeyemo	30 June 2027	
23 June 2026	CM	(Republic of Ireland) Louie Watson	30 June 2028	
6 July 2026	RW	(England) Ade Adeyemo	30 June 2028 (Note: Option of a further year)	
28 October 2026	CB	(England) Josh Flint	30 June 2027	

== Pre-season and friendlies ==
On 8 June, Crawley announced a pre-season friendly against Woking. Four days later, three further friendlies were confirmed against Eastleigh, Oxford United and Reading. The final friendly against Woking was cancelled as Crawley were drawn to play in the Preliminary round of the EFL Cup.

Win Draw Loss Fixtures

25 July 2026 Friendly	Eastleigh	0–1	Crawley Town	Eastleigh
15:00 BST			Pereira 23'	Stadium: Ten Acres

28 July 2026 Friendly	Oxford United	3–1	Crawley Town	Littlemore
19:00 BST	Barker 10' (o.g.); O'Donkor 70'; Goodrham 89'		Ebiowei 31'	Stadium: Kassam Stadium

31 July 2026 Friendly	Crawley Town	0–1	Reading	Crawley
19:30 BST			Beacroft 81'	Stadium: Broadfield Stadium

4 August 2026 Friendly	Woking	Cancelled	Crawley Town	Woking
19:45 BST				Stadium: Kingfield Stadium
Note: Fixture was cancelled due to Crawley competeting in the 2026–27 EFL Cup preliminary round.

== Competitions ==
=== League Two ===
==== League table ====
Pos	Team	Pld	W	D	L	GF	GA	GD	Pts	Promotion, qualification or relegation
20	Oldham Athletic	15	4	3	8	16	21	−5	15	
21	Colchester United	14	3	6	5	14	19	−5	15	
22	Rochdale	15	4	3	8	17	27	−10	15	
23	Rotherham United	14	2	6	6	18	25	−7	12	Relegation to National League
24	Crawley Town	12	2	3	7	13	21	−8	9	Relegation to National League

Updated to match(es) played on 14 November 2026. Source: EFL Official Website
Rules for classification: 1) Points; 2) Goal difference; 3) Number of goals scored; 4) Head-to-head results; 5) Wins; 6) Away goals; 7) Penalty points (sec 9.5); 8) 12-point sending off offences

==== Results summary ====
Overall								Home						Away					
Pld	W	D	L	GF	GA	GD	Pts	W	D	L	GF	GA	GD	W	D	L	GF	GA	GD
12	2	3	7	13	21	−8	9	0	2	4	6	12	−6	2	1	3	7	9	−2

Last updated: 31 October 2026.
Source: Soccerway

==== Results by round ====
Round	1	2	3	4	5	6	7	10	11	12	13	14	15^{3}	16	8^{1}	17	18	19	9^{2}	20	21	22	23	24	25	26	27	28	29	30	31	32
Ground	H	A	H	A	A	H	A	H	A	H	H	A	A	H	H	A	H	H	A	A	H		A	H	H	A	A	H	A	H	H	A
Result	L	W	L	D	L	L	L	D	L	L	D	W	P																			
Position	18	15	17	17	21	23	24	24	24	24	24	24	P																			
Points	0	3	3	4	4	4	4	5	5	5	6	9	P																			

Source: EFL
A = Away; H = Home; W = Win; D = Draw; L = Loss; P = Postponed
Notes:
- ^{1} Matchday 8 (vs. Barnet) was postponed due to international call-ups.
- ^{2} Matchday 9 (vs. Walsall) was postponed due to international call-ups.
- ^{3} Matchday 15 (vs. Rotherham United) was postponed due to international call-ups.

==== Matches ====
On 25 June, the League Two fixtures were revealed.

Win Draw Loss Fixtures

15 August 2026 1	Crawley Town	0–1	Crewe Alexandra	Crawley
15:00 BST	Arthurs (yellow card) 31'; Gordon (red card) 51'; Ebiowei (red card) 64'		Gibson (yellow card) 24'; White (yellow card) 52'; Agius (yellow card) 65'; Demetriou (yellow card) 66' (yellow-red card) 85'; March 90+5'; McNeill (yellow card) 90+8'	Stadium: Broadfield Stadium; Attendance: 6,134; Referee: Andrew Humphries
Note: Crewe Alexandra were temporarily renamed to Crewe Alexsandr for the first matchday of the season after Compare the Market signed a partnership deal with the EFL.

22 August 2026 2	Rochdale	1–2	Crawley Town	Spotland
15:00 BST	Moss (yellow card) 28'; Wilson (yellow card) 34'; Sherring (yellow card) 45+1'; Ebanks-Landell 54'; Ramming (yellow card) 69'	Report	Aderoju 8'; Farquharson (yellow card) 13'; Russell (yellow card) 48'; Arthurs (yellow card) 48'; Watson (yellow card) 69', (goal) 72' (pen.)	Stadium: Crown Oil Arena; Attendance: 3,895; Referee: Zac Kennard-Kettle

29 August 2026 3	Crawley Town	0–2	Bristol Rovers	Crawley
15:00 BST	Watson (yellow card) 31'; Krasniqi (yellow card) 48'; Morgan (yellow card) 89'	Report	James 23', (yellow card) 68'; Leigh (yellow card) 29'; Kamwa 41'; Balmer (yellow card) 43'; Harbottle (yellow card) 81'	Stadium: Broadfield Stadium; Attendance: 4,120 (851 away); Referee: Leigh Doughty

1 September 2026 4	Northampton Town	1–1	Crawley Town	Sixfields
19:45 BST	N. Opoku 38'; L. Evans (red card) 55'	Report	K. Krasniqi (yellow card) 42'; J. Arthurs (yellow card) 60'; D. Pereira 67'	Stadium: Sixfields Stadium; Attendance: 4,890; Referee: Alan Dale

5 September 2026 5	Accrington Stanley	3–2	Crawley Town	Accrington
15:00 BST	Caton 4', 55'; Matthews (yellow card) 30', (goal) 63'; Rawson (yellow card) 42'; Whalley (yellow card) 53'; Tutonda (yellow card) 73'	Report	Orsi 20'; Farquharson (yellow card) 45+3'; Krasniqi (yellow card) 61'; Aderoju 79'	Stadium: Wham Stadium; Referee: Thomas Kirk

12 September 2026 6	Crawley Town	1–3	Cheltenham Town	Crawley
12:30 BST	Morgan 7', (yellow card) 35'; Barker (yellow card) 42'; Arthurs (yellow card) 67'; Farquharson (yellow card) 72'		McCann 32', 54'; Weimann 35'; Evans (yellow card) 45'; Shipley (yellow card) 85'	Stadium: Broadfield Stadium; Referee: Ben Toner
Note: Fixture was initially scheduled for a 15:00 kick-off, but was brought forward for live Sky Sports.

19 September 2026 7	Grimsby Town	2–0	Crawley Town	Cleethorpes
15:00 BST	Vernam (penalty missed) 13'; Morgan 30' (pen.); Green 42'; Kacurri (yellow card) 48'; Turi (yellow card) 65'	Report	Michalski (yellow card) 29'; Farquharson (yellow card) 39'; Adeyemo (yellow card) 58'; Ebiowei (yellow card) 87'	Stadium: Blundell Park; Attendance: 7,330; Referee: Emily Heaslip

10 October 2026 10	Crawley Town	2–2	Chesterfield	Crawley
15:00 BST	Jennings (yellow card) 44'; Di Biase 61', 66', (yellow card) 83'; Russell (yellow card) 90+4'		Bonis 23'; Marsh 56', (yellow card) 80'; Koroma (yellow card) 65'; Markanday (yellow card) 90'; Gordon (yellow card) 90+4'	Stadium: Broadfield Stadium; Attendance: 6,134; Referee: Ben Atkinson

17 October 2026 11	Salford City	2–1	Crawley Town	Kersal
15:00 BST	Langstaff 17', 50'	Report	Morgan 59'	Stadium: AIG Stadium; Referee: Scott Jackson

20 October 2026 12	Crawley Town	2–3	Shrewsbury Town	Crawley
19:45 BST	Adeyemo 4'; Russell (yellow card) 37'; Morgan (yellow card) 84', (goal) 85'	Report	Hoole (yellow card) 3'; Davison (yellow card) 43', (goal) 62', 90+4'; Lloyd 82', (yellow card) 90+5'	Stadium: Broadfield Stadium; Referee: Isaac Searle

24 October 2026 13	Crawley Town	1–1	Tranmere Rovers	Crawley
15:00 BST	Jennings (yellow card) 32'; Morgan 52'	Report	Vaulks 60', (yellow card) 76'; Ince (yellow card) 67'	Stadium: Broadfield Stadium; Attendance: 3,140; Referee: Lewis Sandoe

31 October 2026 14	Oldham Athletic	0–1	Crawley Town	Oldham
15:00 GMT	Payne (red card) 14'; Drummond (red card) 30'; Hill (yellow card) 60'; Daniels (yellow card) 63'	Report	Jennings (yellow card) 25'; Orsi 52'; Russell (yellow card) 72'; Gordon (yellow card) 85'	Stadium: Boundary Park; Attendance: 6,468 (124 away); Referee: David Rock

14 November 2026 15	Rotherham United	Postponed	Crawley Town	Rotherham
15:00 GMT				Stadium: AESSEAL New York Stadium
Note: Fixture was postponed due to international call-ups.

21 November 2026 16	Crawley Town	v	Fleetwood Town	Crawley
15:00 GMT				Stadium: Broadfield Stadium

24 November 2026 8	Crawley Town	v	Barnet	Crawley
19:45 GMT				Stadium: Broadfield Stadium
Note: Fixture was initially scheduled for a 15:00 kick-off, but was brought forward for live Sky Sports. It was then postponed and rearranged due to international call-ups within the Barnet squad.

28 November 2026 17	Exeter City	v	Crawley Town	Exeter
15:00 GMT				Stadium: St James Park

1 December 2026 18	Crawley Town	v	Port Vale	Crawley
19:45 GMT				Stadium: Broadfield Stadium

12 December 2026 19	Crawley Town	v	Newport County	Crawley
15:00 GMT				Stadium: Broadfield Stadium

15 December 2026 9	Walsall	v	Crawley Town	Bescot
19:45 GMT				Stadium: Pallet-Track Bescot Stadium
Note: Fixture was originally scheduled for 3 October, but was postponed due to international call-ups and then later rearranged for 15 December.

19 December 2026 20	York City	v	Cheltenham Town	Huntington
15:00 GMT				Stadium: LNER Community Stadium

26 December 2026 21	Crawley Town	v	Gillingham	Crawley
15:00 GMT				Stadium: Broadfield Stadium

29 December 2026 22	Colchester United	v	Crawley Town	Colchester
19:45 GMT				Stadium: Colchester Community Stadium

1 January 2027 23	Swindon Town	v	Crawley Town	Swindon
15:00 GMT				Stadium: County Ground

9 January 2027 24	Crawley Town	v	York City	Crawley
15:00 GMT				Stadium: Broadfield Stadium

16 January 2027 25	Crawley Town	v	Salford City	Crawley
15:00 GMT				Stadium: Broadfield Stadium

19 January 2027 26	Shrewsbury Town	v	Crawley Town	Shrewsbury
19:45 GMT				Stadium: Croud Meadow

23 January 2027 27	Tranmere Rovers	v	Crawley Town	Birkenhead
15:00 GMT				Stadium: Prenton Park

30 January 2027 28	Crawley Town	v	Oldham Athletic	Crawley
15:00 GMT				Stadium: Broadfield Stadium

6 February 2027 29	Bristol Rovers	v	Crawley Town	Horfield
15:00 GMT				Stadium: Memorial Stadium

9 February 2027 30	Crawley Town	v	Northampton Town	Crawley
19:45 GMT				Stadium: Broadfield Stadium

13 February 2027 31	Crawley Town	v	Accrington Stanley	Crawley
15:00 GMT				Stadium: Broadfield Stadium

20 February 2027 32	Cheltenham Town	v	Crawley Town	Cheltenham
12:30 GMT				Stadium: EV Charger Points Stadium
Note: Fixture was initially scheduled for a 15:00 kick-off, but was brought forward for live Sky Sports broadcasting.

=== FA Cup ===
Crawley were drawn away to Wimborne Town in the first round.

Win Draw Loss Fixtures

8 November 2026 First round	Wimborne Town	2–0	Crawley Town	Wimborne Minster
15:00 GMT	Yang Seung-woo 9'; Smith (yellow card) 15'; Roberts (yellow card) 51'; Munn (yellow card) 61', (goal) 79'; King (yellow card) 90'; Díaz (yellow card) 90+7'	Report	Tinsdale (yellow card) 72'; Barker (yellow card) 84'	Stadium: The Wyatt Homes Stadium; Attendance: 3,250; Referee: Kirsty Dowle
Note: Fixture was selected for live TNT Sports broadcasting.

=== EFL Cup ===
Crawley were drawn away to York City in the preliminary round.

Win Draw Loss Fixtures

3 August 2026 Preliminary round	York City	0–2	Crawley Town	Huntington
19:30 BST	Brookes (yellow card) 36'; Medley (yellow card) 71'; Akinyemi (yellow card) 76'; McNally (yellow card) 86'		Di Biase 24'; Arthurs (yellow card) 44'; Barker (yellow card) 49'; Russell (yellow card) 69'; Orsi 86' (pen.)	Stadium: York Community Stadium; Referee: Thomas Parsons

8 August 2026 First round	Watford	1–0	Crawley Town	Watford
15:00 BST	Bove (yellow card) 24'; Bravo (yellow card) 63'; Bola 90+9'		Barker (yellow card) 62'; Gordon (yellow card) 67'; Aderoju (yellow card) 90+7'	Stadium: Vicarage Road; Attendance: 6,907; Referee: Harry Wager

=== EFL Trophy ===
==== Group stage ====
Crawley were drawn against Bromley, Milton Keynes Dons and Brentford U21 into Southern Group H.

Pos	Div	Team	Pld	W	PW	PL	L	GF	GA	GD	Pts	Qualification
1	L1	Milton Keynes Dons	3	3	0	0	0	13	3	+10	9	Advance to Round 2
2	ACA	Brentford U21	3	2	0	0	1	4	8	−4	6	Advance to Round 2
3	L2	Crawley Town	3	1	0	0	2	6	6	0	3	
4	L1	Bromley	3	0	0	0	3	1	7	−6	0	

Source: EFL

Win Draw Loss Fixtures

22 September 2026 1	Milton Keynes Dons	4–1	Crawley Town	Denbigh
19:00 BST	Fullah (yellow card) 22'; Matete (yellow card) 31'; Wiles 42'; Sanders 45'; Campbell 61'; Hepburn-Murphy 70' (pen.)	Report	Robertson (yellow card) 19'; Ferizaj (yellow card) 73'; Tinsdale 90+1'; Ewens-Findlay (yellow card) 90+3'	Stadium: Stadium MK; Attendance: 1,145 (108 away); Referee: Aaron Farmer

6 October 2026 2	Crawley Town	4–0	Bromley	Crawley
19:45 BST	Patten 35' (o.g.); Duke-McKenna 48', 90+1'; Porter 51' (o.g.); Barker (yellow card) 76'; Kamara (yellow card) 85'	Report	Kabamba (yellow card) 76'; Patten (yellow card) 76'; Brenan (yellow card) 79'	Stadium: Broadfield Stadium; Referee: Sam Mulhall

10 November 2026 3	Crawley Town	1–2	Brentford U21	Crawley
19:30 BST	Wickham 90+2' (pen.)	Report	Bobb-Semple 27', 51'; Holland (penalty missed) 50', (yellow card) 86'	Stadium: Broadfield Stadium; Attendance: 819; Referee: Sunny Singh Gill

== Statistics ==
=== Appearances and goals ===
As of match played 10 November 2026

Players with no appearances are not included on the list, italics indicate a loaned in player

No.	Pos	Nat	Player	Total		League Two		FA Cup		EFL Cup		EFL Trophy	
No.	Pos	Nat	Player	Apps	Goals	Apps	Goals	Apps	Goals	Apps	Goals	Apps	Goals
1	GK	(Italy) ITA	Vito Mannone	11	0	6+0	0	1+0	0	2+0	0	2+0	0
2	DF	(England) ENG	Kellan Gordon	12	0	5+4	0	1+0	0	2+0	0	0+0	0
3	DF	(England) ENG	Josh Flint	3	0	0+1	0	0+1	0	0+0	0	1+0	0
4	DF	(Spain) ESP	Pele Arganese-McDermott	5	0	0+2	0	0+0	0	0+2	0	1+0	0
5	DF	(England) ENG	Charlie Barker	14	0	9+0	0	1+0	0	2+0	0	2+0	0
6	DF	(England) ENG	Priestley Farquharson	15	0	12+0	0	1+0	0	1+0	0	1+0	0
7	FW	(England) ENG	Malcolm Ebiowei	9	0	2+2	0	0+1	0	2+0	0	1+1	0
8	MF	(Republic of Ireland) IRL	Louie Watson	14	1	6+3	1	0+0	0	2+0	0	2+1	0
9	FW	(Northern Ireland) NIR	Danilo Orsi	12	3	6+3	2	1+0	0	0+1	1	1+0	0
10	FW	(Guyana) GUY	Stephen Duke-McKenna	10	2	6+0	0	1+0	0	2+0	0	0+1	2
11	FW	(England) ENG	Pemi Aderoju	13	2	3+7	2	0+1	0	0+1	0	1+0	0
12	DF	(England) ENG	Lewis Richards	10	0	5+2	0	1+0	0	0+0	0	2+0	0
13	GK	(England) ENG	Nicholas Michalski	5	0	4+1	0	0+0	0	0+0	0	0+0	0
14	FW	(Italy) ITA	Gianmarco Di Biase	11	3	2+5	2	0+0	0	2+0	1	1+1	0
16	DF	(Northern Ireland) NIR	Jonny Russell	14	0	6+5	0	1+0	0	0+2	0	0+0	0
17	FW	(Sierra Leone) SLE	Osman Kamara	14	0	7+3	0	0+0	0	0+2	0	1+1	0
19	FW	(Antigua and Barbuda) ANT	Dion Pereira	7	1	1+6	1	0+0	0	0+0	0	0+0	0
20	MF	(England) ENG	Jude Arthurs	16	0	12+0	0	1+0	0	2+0	0	1+0	0
21	MF	(Republic of Ireland) IRL	Justin Ferizaj	2	0	0+0	0	0+0	0	0+0	0	2+0	0
22	FW	(Denmark) DEN	Ade Adeyemo	17	1	11+1	1	0+0	0	2+0	0	2+1	0
24	DF	(England) ENG	Akin Odimayo	10	0	6+1	0	0+0	0	1+0	0	2+0	0
25	MF	(England) ENG	Klaudio Krasniqi	10	0	4+2	0	0+0	0	2+0	0	1+1	0
26	MF	(England) ENG	Ayman Benarous	1	0	0+0	0	0+0	0	0+0	0	1+0	0
27	FW	(England) ENG	Dylan Morgan	13	4	8+2	4	1+0	0	0+0	0	1+1	0
28	MF	(England) ENG	Nathan Tinsdale	10	1	2+4	0	0+1	0	0+0	0	2+1	1
29	FW	(England) ENG	Connor Wickham	1	1	0+0	0	0+0	0	0+0	0	0+1	1
30	MF	(England) ENG	Kai Jennings	8	0	6+0	0	1+0	0	0+0	0	1+0	0
31	GK	(England) ENG	Jackson Izquierdo	3	0	2+0	0	0+0	0	0+0	0	1+0	0
33	DF	(England) ENG	Omari Mrisho	2	0	0+0	0	0+0	0	0+1	0	1+0	0
35	DF	(England) ENG	Ty Ewens-Findlay	3	0	1+1	0	0+0	0	0+0	0	0+1	0
44	DF	(England) ENG	Ben Heneghan	2	0	0+0	0	0+1	0	0+0	0	1+0	0
56	MF	(England) ENG	Jude Robertson	3	0	0+0	0	0+0	0	0+0	0	1+2	0
Players who featured but departed the club permanently during the season:
26	MF	(Saint Kitts and Nevis) SKN	Jay Williams	1	0	0	0	0	0	0+1	0	0	0

=== Disciplinary record ===
As of match played 10 November 2026

Includes all competitive matches. The list is sorted by squad number when disciplinary points / points per card / number of cards are equal. Players with no cards not included in the list.

Rank	No.	Pos.	Nat.	Name	League Two			FA Cup			EFL Cup			EFL Trophy			Total		
Rank	No.	Pos.	Nat.	Name	Yellow card	Second yellow card	Red card	Yellow card	Second yellow card	Red card	Yellow card	Second yellow card	Red card	Yellow card	Second yellow card	Red card	Yellow card	Second yellow card	Red card
1	5	CB	(England)	Charlie Barker	2	0	0	1	0	0	2	0	0	1	0	0	6	0	0
2	2	RWB	(England)	Kellan Gordon	1	0	1	0	0	0	1	0	0	0	0	0	2	0	1
2	16	LB	(Northern Ireland)	Jonny Russell	4	0	0	0	0	0	1	0	0	0	0	0	5	0	0
2	20	CM	(England)	Jude Arthurs	4	0	0	0	0	0	1	0	0	0	0	0	5	0	0
5	6	CB	(England)	Priestley Farquharson	4	0	0	0	0	0	0	0	0	0	0	0	4	0	0
5	7	RW	(England)	Malcolm Ebiowei	1	0	1	0	0	0	0	0	0	0	0	0	1	0	1
7	25	CDM	(England)	Klaudio Krasniqi	3	0	0	0	0	0	0	0	0	0	0	0	3	0	0
7	27	LW	(England)	Dylan Morgan	3	0	0	0	0	0	0	0	0	0	0	0	3	0	0
7	30	CDM	(England)	Kai Jennings	3	0	0	0	0	0	0	0	0	0	0	0	3	0	0
10	8	CAM	(Republic of Ireland)	Louie Watson	2	0	0	0	0	0	0	0	0	0	0	0	2	0	0
11	11	CF	(England)	Pemi Aderoju	0	0	0	0	0	0	1	0	0	0	0	0	1	0	0
11	13	GK	(England)	Nicholas Michalski	1	0	0	0	0	0	0	0	0	0	0	0	1	0	0
11	14	CF	(Italy) Gianmarco Di Biase	1	0	0	0	0	0	0	0	0	0	0	0	1	0	0	
11	17	LW	(Sierra Leone)	Osman Kamara	0	0	0	0	0	0	0	0	0	1	0	0	1	0	0
11	21	CM	(Republic of Ireland)	Justin Ferizaj	0	0	0	0	0	0	0	0	0	1	0	0	1	0	0
11	22	LWB	(Denmark)	Ade Adeyemo	1	0	0	0	0	0	0	0	0	0	0	0	1	0	0
11	28	LM	(England)	Nathan Tinsdale	0	0	0	1	0	0	0	0	0	0	0	0	1	0	0
11	35	CB	(England)	Ty Ewens-Findlay	0	0	0	0	0	0	0	0	0	1	0	0	1	0	0
56	CM	(England)	Jude Robertson	0	0	0	0	0	0	0	0	0	1	0	0	1	0	0	
Total					30	0	2	2	0	0	6	0	0	5	0	0	43	0	2
