= Richard Ward =

Richard Ward may refer to:

== People ==
- Richard Ward (footballer) (born 1973), English footballer
- Richard Ward (British Army officer) (1917–1989)
- Richard Ward (actor) (1915–1979), African American actor
- Richard Ward (businessman) (born 1957), British businessman
- Richard Ward (governor) (1689–1763), governor of the Colony of Rhode Island and Providence Plantations
- Richard Ward (priest), archdeacon of Cardigan, 1951–1962
- Richard Ward (judge) (1916–1977), Australian jurist and politician
- Richard S. Ward (born 1951), professor of mathematics at Durham University
- Richard F. Ward (born 1951), American storyteller and professor
- Richard Ward (c.1990-2022), unarmed man killed by police at Liberty Point International Middle School, see killing of Richard Ward
- Rich Ward (born 1969), American guitarist
- Dick Ward (1909–1966), baseball player
- Rick Ward III (born 1982), Louisiana politician
- Sir Richard Warde or Ward (died 1578), English politician and royal official

== Other uses ==
- USS J. Richard Ward, named for James R. Ward

== See also ==
- James R. Ward (James Richard Ward, 1921–1941), US Navy sailor who died on board the battleship USS Oklahoma (BB-37) during the attack on Pearl Harbor
- Richard Ward Pelham (1815–1876), American blackface performer
