= 1993–94 Huddersfield Town A.F.C. season =

Huddersfield Town
1993–94 season
- Chairman: Terry Fisher
- Manager: Neil Warnock
- Stadium: Leeds Road
- Second Division: 11th
- FA Cup: Second round (eliminated by Port Vale)
- League Cup: Second round (eliminated by Arsenal)
- League Trophy: Runners-up (eliminated by Swansea City)
- Top goalscorer: League: Phil Starbuck (12); All: Phil Starbuck (16)
- Highest home attendance: 16,195 vs Blackpool (30 April 1994)
- Lowest home attendance: 1,069 vs Doncaster Rovers (28 September 1993)
- Biggest win: 3–0 vs Scarborough (11 March 1995); 4–1 vs Hartlepool United (27 December 1993); 4–1 vs Carlisle United (8 March 1994); 3–0 vs Wrexham (12 April 1994)
- Biggest defeat: 0–5 vs Arsenal (21 September 1993)

Huddersfield Town's 1993–94 campaign was Town's last season playing at their Leeds Road stadium, before moving to the Alfred McAlpine Stadium. Neil Warnock became the Town boss following Ian Ross' resignation. Town finished in 11th place, but a good run in the League Trophy saw Town reach a final at Wembley final for the first time since the 1938 FA Cup Final. Town did lose 3–1 on penalties to Swansea City.

== Squad at the start of the season ==
Note: Flags indicate national team as defined under FIFA eligibility rules; some limited exceptions apply. Players may hold more than one non-FIFA nationality.

No.	Pos.	Nation	Player
--	GK	ENG	Kevin Blackwell
--	GK	ENG	Steve Francis
--	DF	ENG	Jon Dyson
--	DF	ENG	Peter Jackson
--	DF	ENG	Graham Mitchell
--	DF	ENG	Simon Trevitt
--	MF	ENG	Gary Barnett
--	MF	ENG	Chris Billy

No.	Pos.	Nation	Player
--	MF	ENG	Chris Marsden
--	MF	ENG	Phil Robinson
--	MF	ENG	Mark Wells
--	FW	ENG	Andy Booth
--	FW	ENG	Iain Dunn
--	FW	SCO	Iffy Onuora
--	FW	WAL	Iwan Roberts
--	FW	ENG	Phil Starbuck

== Review ==
Neil Warnock's first game in charge saw Town lose 3–0 at home against Reading, which was the start of a particularly bad opening spell of the season, which saw only one win in the first 8 games. After that period was a second round League Cup match against Premier League side Arsenal. They lost the first leg 5–0 at Leeds Road, but amazingly they drew 1–1 at Highbury Stadium to lose 6–1 on aggregate.

The mid season didn't give much more joy, but a run in the League Trophy saw Town reach the area final for a two-legged play-off against Carlisle United. They won the first leg 4–1 at Leeds Road, but despite losing 2–0 at Brunton Park, they won 4–3 on aggregate to set up a final at Wembley against Swansea City. This was Town's first match at Wembley since the 1938 FA Cup Final, when they lost to Preston North End. The match was a 1–1 draw, but Town then lost 3–1 on a penalty shoot-out.

Following the defeat to promotion chasing Port Vale on 15 March, many were even wondering if Town were staying in Division 2. But that turned out to be Town's last league defeat of the season as Town won 8 of their last 12 games, so Town finished in a respectable 11th place.

== Squad at the end of the season ==
Note: Flags indicate national team as defined under FIFA eligibility rules; some limited exceptions apply. Players may hold more than one non-FIFA nationality.

No.	Pos.	Nation	Player
--	GK	ENG	Kevin Blackwell
--	GK	ENG	Steve Francis
--	DF	SCO	Tom Cowan (on loan from Sheffield United)
--	DF	ENG	Jon Dyson
--	DF	ENG	Peter Jackson
--	DF	ENG	Graham Mitchell
--	DF	IRL	Pat Scully
--	DF	ENG	Simon Trevitt
--	MF	ENG	Simon Baldry
--	MF	ENG	Chris Billy

No.	Pos.	Nation	Player
--	MF	ENG	Darren Bullock
--	MF	ENG	Gary Clayton
--	MF	ENG	Richard Logan
--	MF	ENG	Phil Robinson
--	MF	ENG	Mark Wells
--	FW	ENG	Andy Booth
--	FW	ENG	Iain Dunn
--	FW	ENG	Ronnie Jepson
--	FW	ENG	Rodney Rowe
--	FW	ENG	Phil Starbuck

== Results ==
=== Football League Second Division ===
Date	Opponents	Home/ Away	Result F–A	Scorers	Attendance	Position
14 August 1993	Reading	H	0–3		6,415	24th
21 August 1993	Rotherham United	A	3–2	Onuora, Roberts, Wells	5,540	13th
28 August 1993	Stockport County	H	1–1	Onuora	7,053	13th
31 August 1993	Swansea City	A	0–1		4,318	17th
4 September 1993	Brighton & Hove Albion	A	2–2	Wells, Onuora	4,518	17th
11 September 1993	Exeter City	H	0–1		5,266	20th
14 September 1993	Port Vale	H	1–1	Dunn	5,154	22nd
18 September 1993	Hull City	A	1–2	Starbuck	7,570	22nd
25 September 1993	Fulham	H	1–0	Hicks	5,616	21st
2 October 1993	Plymouth Argyle	A	0–2		6,646	21st
9 October 1993	York City	A	2–0	Wells, Roberts	6,363	18th
16 October 1993	Barnet	H	1–2	Wells	5,614	19th
23 October 1993	Burnley	A	1–1	Starbuck	12,011	19th
30 October 1993	Bristol Rovers	H	1–0	Roberts	5,612	19th
2 November 1993	Bradford City	A	0–3		8,096	19th
6 November 1993	Cambridge United	H	1–1	Rowe	4,767	19th
20 November 1993	Blackpool	A	1–2	Roberts	4,704	19th
27 November 1993	Brentford	H	1–3	Starbuck (pen)	4,546	20th
11 December 1993	Rotherham United	H	2–1	Starbuck (pen), Onuora	4,994	19th
18 December 1993	Reading	A	0–0		5,675	20th
27 December 1993	Hartlepool United	A	4–1	Jepson, Onuora, Bullock, Trevitt	3,286	18th
1 January 1994	Leyton Orient	A	0–1		4,599	19th
3 January 1994	Bournemouth	H	1–1	Starbuck (pen)	6,047	19th
15 January 1994	Barnet	A	1–0	P. Robinson	3,022	16th
22 January 1994	York City	H	3–2	Jepson (3)	6,802	16th
29 January 1994	Bristol Rovers	A	0–0		5,127	15th
5 February 1994	Burnley	H	1–1	Onuora	10,634	15th
12 February 1994	Wrexham	A	1–3	Bullock	4,011	19th
19 February 1994	Stockport County	A	0–3		5,071	19th
22 February 1994	Swansea City	H	1–1	Currie	3,824	19th
25 February 1994	Brighton & Hove Albion	H	1–3	Clayton	5,088	19th
5 March 1994	Exeter City	A	3–2	Dunn, Bullock (2)	2,939	19th
12 March 1994	Hull City	H	0–2		6,675	20th
15 March 1994	Port Vale	A	0–1		7,010	20th
19 March 1994	Fulham	A	1–1	Booth	3,624	20th
26 March 1994	Plymouth Argyle	H	1–0	Booth	5,619	20th
29 March 1994	Bournemouth	A	2–1	Starbuck, Booth	3,104	18th
2 April 1994	Hartlepool United	H	1–1	Booth	5,717	19th
4 April 1994	Cardiff City	A	2–2	Starbuck, Baldry	5,525	18th
9 April 1994	Leyton Orient	H	1–0	Booth	4,995	19th
12 April 1994	Wrexham	H	3–0	Starbuck (pen), Jepson, Booth	4,191	17th
17 April 1994	Bradford City	H	1–1	Dunn	9,342	16th
19 April 1994	Cardiff City	H	2–0	Booth (2)	6,267	14th
26 April 1994	Cambridge United	A	5–4	Dunn, Starbuck (3, 1 pen), Booth	3,901	12th
30 April 1994	Blackpool	H	2–1	Baldry (1), Starbuck (68)	16,195	11th
7 May 1994	Brentford	A	2–1	Dunn (2)	4,483	11th

=== FA Cup ===
Date	Round	Opponents	Home/ Away	Result F–A	Scorers	Attendance
13 November 1993	Round 1	Telford United	A	1–1	Rowe	2,257
23 November 1993	Round 1 Replay	Telford United	H	1–0	Jackson	3,517
3 December 1993	Round 2	Port Vale	A	0–1		8,602

=== League Cup ===
Date	Round	Opponents	Home/ Away	Result F–A	Scorers	Attendance
17 August 1993	Round 1 1st Leg	Scarborough	H	0–0		2,822
24 August 1993	Round 1 2nd Leg	Scarborough	A	3–0	Dunn (2), Roberts	2,612: Huddersfield won 3–0 on aggregate
21 September 1993	Round 2 1st Leg	Arsenal	H	0–5		14,275
5 October 1993	Round 2 2nd Leg	Arsenal	A	1–1	Dunn	18,789: Huddersfield lost 6–1 on aggregate

=== League Trophy ===
Date	Round	Opponents	Home/ Away	Result F–A	Scorers	Attendance
28 September 1993	Round 1 Group 5	Doncaster Rovers	H	3–1	Starbuck, Dunn (2)	1,069
9 November 1993	Round 1 Group 5	Rotherham United	A	1–1	Rowe	1,598
30 November 1993	Round 2	Preston North End	H	0 – 0 (aet: 90 mins: 0 – 0)		1,379

	Penalties
Starbuck (penalty scored); Dunn (penalty scored); Jackson (penalty scored); Billy (penalty scored); Bullock (penalty scored)	5 – 3	(penalty scored) Ellis; (penalty scored) Ainsworth; (penalty scored) Woods; (penalty missed) Fensome: missed

Date	Round	Opponents	Home/ Away	Result F–A	Scorers	Attendance
11 January 1994	Area Quarter-Final	Crewe Alexandra	H	3 – 2 (aet: 90 mins: 2 – 2)	Starbuck (2), Dunn	2,287
1 March 1994	Area Semi-Final	Stockport County	A	1–0	Dunn	4,980
8 March 1994	Area Final 1st Leg	Carlisle United	H	4–1	Jackson, Bullock, Starbuck, Dunn	10,552
22 March 1994	Area Final 2nd Leg	Carlisle United	A	0–2		8,330: Huddersfield won 4–3 on aggregate.
24 April 1994	Final	Swansea City	N	1–1	Logan	47,773

	Penalties
Cornforth (penalty scored); Ampadu (penalty scored); Torpey (penalty scored)	3 – 1	(penalty missed) Mitchell: hit crossbar (penalty scored) Scully; (penalty missed) Starbuck: hit crossbar (penalty missed) Cowan: Freestone saved

== Appearances and goals ==
Name	Nationality	Position	League		FA Cup		League Cup		Football League Trophy		Total	
Name	Nationality	Position	Apps	Goals	Apps	Goals	Apps	Goals	Apps	Goals	Apps	Goals
Simon Baldry	England	MF	10	2	0	0	0	0	1	0	11	2
Gary Barnett	England	MF	1	0	0	0	0	0	0	0	1	0
Chris Billy	England	MF	34	0	3	0	4	0	7	0	48	0
Kevin Blackwell	England	GK	0 (1)	0	0	0	0	0	0	0	0 (1)	0
Andy Booth	England	FW	18 (8)	9	1	0	2 (1)	0	7	1	28 (9)	10
Darren Bullock	England	MF	20	4	0	0	0	0	6	1	26	5
Gary Clayton	England	MF	15 (2)	1	0	0	0	0	0	0	15 (2)	1
Simon Collins	England	DF	1	0	0	0	0 (1)	0	0 (2)	0	1 (3)	0
Tom Cowan	Scotland	DF	10	0	0	0	0	0	1	0	11	0
David Currie	England	FW	7	1	0	0	0	0	1	0	8	1
Iain Dunn	England	FW	20 (14)	6	1	0	4	3	3 (3)	4	28 (17)	13
Jon Dyson	England	DF	19 (3)	0	1	0	3	0	4 (1)	0	27 (4)	0
Steve Francis	England	GK	46	0	3	0	4	0	8	0	61	0
Steve Harkness	England	DF	5	0	0	0	0	0	1	0	6	0
Stuart Hicks	England	DF	20 (2)	1	3	0	3	0	1	0	27 (2)	1
Peter Jackson	England	DF	30 (3)	0	3	1	3	0	7	1	43 (3)	2
Ronnie Jepson	England	FW	19 (4)	5	0	0	0	0	0	0	19 (4)	5
Richard Logan	England	MF	9 (7)	0	0	0	0	0	6	1	15 (7)	1
Chris Marsden	England	MF	2	0	0	0	1	0	1	0	4	0
Graham Mitchell	England	DF	20 (2)	0	3	0	1 (1)	0	5	0	29 (3)	0
Iffy Onuora	Scotland	FW	12 (10)	6	1 (1)	0	2 (2)	0	2 (1)	0	17 (14)	6
Iwan Roberts	Wales	FW	14 (1)	4	2	0	2 (1)	1	0 (1)	0	18 (3)	5
Phil Robinson	England	MF	39	1	2	0	3	0	6	0	50	1
Ronnie Robinson	England	DF	2	0	0	0	0	0	0	0	2	0
Rodney Rowe	England	FW	7 (6)	1	3	1	0	0	3	1	13 (6)	3
Pat Scully	Republic of Ireland	DF	11	0	0	0	0	0	1	0	12	0
Phil Starbuck	England	FW	45 (1)	12	1	0	3 (1)	0	7	4	56 (2)	16
Simon Trevitt	England	DF	31	1	3	0	4	0	4 (1)	0	42 (1)	1
Richard Ward	England	MF	0	0	0	0	1	0	0	0	1	0
Mark Wells	England	MF	21 (1)	4	3	0	4	0	2 (1)	0	30 (2)	4
Jon Whitney	England	DF	14	0	0	0	0	0	4	0	18	0
Andy Williams	England	MF	4 (2)	0	0	0	0	0	0	0	4 (2)	0
