= Ade Adeyemo =

English footballer (born 1998)

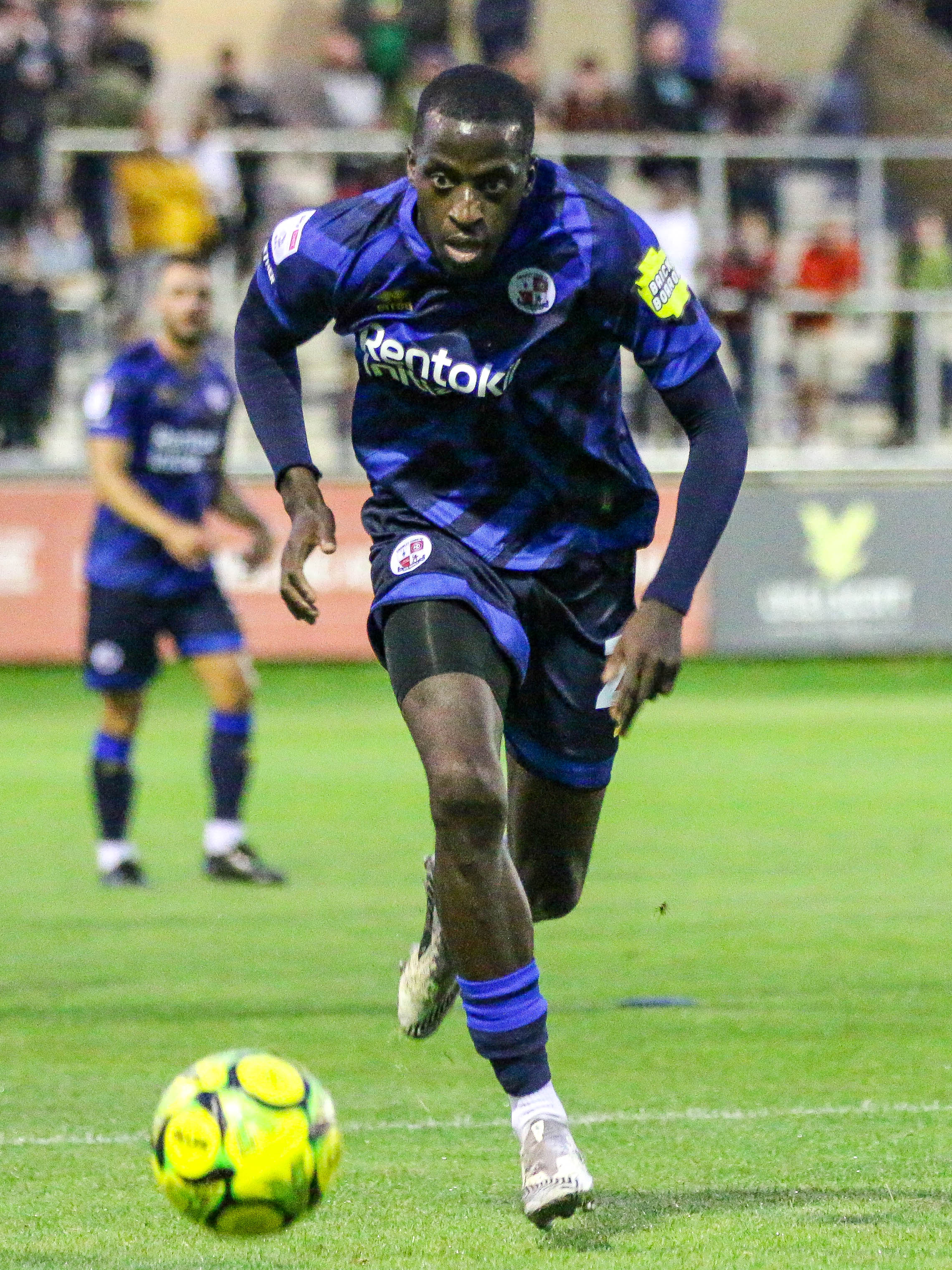
- Adeyemo with Crawley Town in July 2024

Personal information
- Full name: Adetokunbo Bamidele Adeyemo
- Date of birth: 13 July 1998 (age 28)
- Height: 1.88 m (6 ft 2 in)
- Position: Forward

Team information
- Current team: Crawley Town
- Number: 22

Youth career
- 2014–2016: Millwall

Senior career*
Years	Team	Apps	(Gls)
2016	Fisher		
2016	Beckenham Town		
2020–2022	Cray Valley Paper Mills	28	(5)
2022	Hayes & Yeading United		
2022–2023	Cray Valley Paper Mills	34	(14)
2023–	Crawley Town	95	(7)
- * Club domestic league appearances and goals as of 13:59, 22 November 2026 (UTC)

Adetokunbo Bamidele Adeyemo (born 13 July 1998) is an English professional footballer who plays for EFL League Two club Crawley Town as a forward.

== Career ==
After playing youth football for Millwall and in non-league with Fisher, Beckenham Town, Hayes & Yeading United and Cray Valley Paper Mills, he signed a two-year contract with Crawley Town in July 2023. He made his debut for the club in a 0–0 EFL Trophy draw with Sutton United on 10 October 2023.

He scored his first goal in professional football in a 2–1 victory against Notts County in League Two on 12 March 2024.

A contract option was triggered with Crawley at the end of the 2025–26 season, with the new contract being signed in July 2026.

== Career statistics ==
As of match played on 21 November 2026

Appearances and goals by club, season and competition
Club	Season	League			FA Cup		EFL Cup		Other		Total	
Club	Season	Division	Apps	Goals	Apps	Goals	Apps	Goals	Apps	Goals	Apps	Goals
Cray Valley Paper Mills	2020–21	Isthmian League South East Division	3	1	6	2	–		1 (Note: Appearance in the London Senior Cup)	0	10	3
Cray Valley Paper Mills	2021–22	Isthmian League South East Division	25	4	1	0	–		4 (Note: 1 appearance in the London Senior Cup, 2 appearances in the Alan Turvey Trophy, 1 appearance in the play-offs)	0	30	4
Cray Valley Paper Mills	Total		28	5	7	2	0	0	5	0	40	7
Cray Valley Paper Mills	2022–23	Isthmian League South East Division	34	14	2	1	–		3 (Note: 2 appearances in the FA Trophy, 1 appearance in the Kent Senior Cup)	0	39	15
Crawley Town	2023–24	League Two	22	1	1	0	0	0	5 (Note: 3 appearances in the EFL Trophy, 2 appearances in the play-offs)	0	28	1
Crawley Town	2024–25	League One	29	4	2	0	2	1	2 (Note: Appearance(s) in the EFL Trophy)	0	35	5
Crawley Town	2025–26	League Two	31	1	0	0	1	0	1	0	33	1
Crawley Town	2026–27	League Two	13	1	0	0	2	0	3	0	18	1
Crawley Town	Total		95	7	3	0	5	1	11	0	114	8
Career total			157	26	12	3	5	1	19	0	193	30

== Honours ==
Crawley Town

- EFL League Two play-offs: 2024
