= Charlie Barker (footballer) =

English footballer (born 2003)

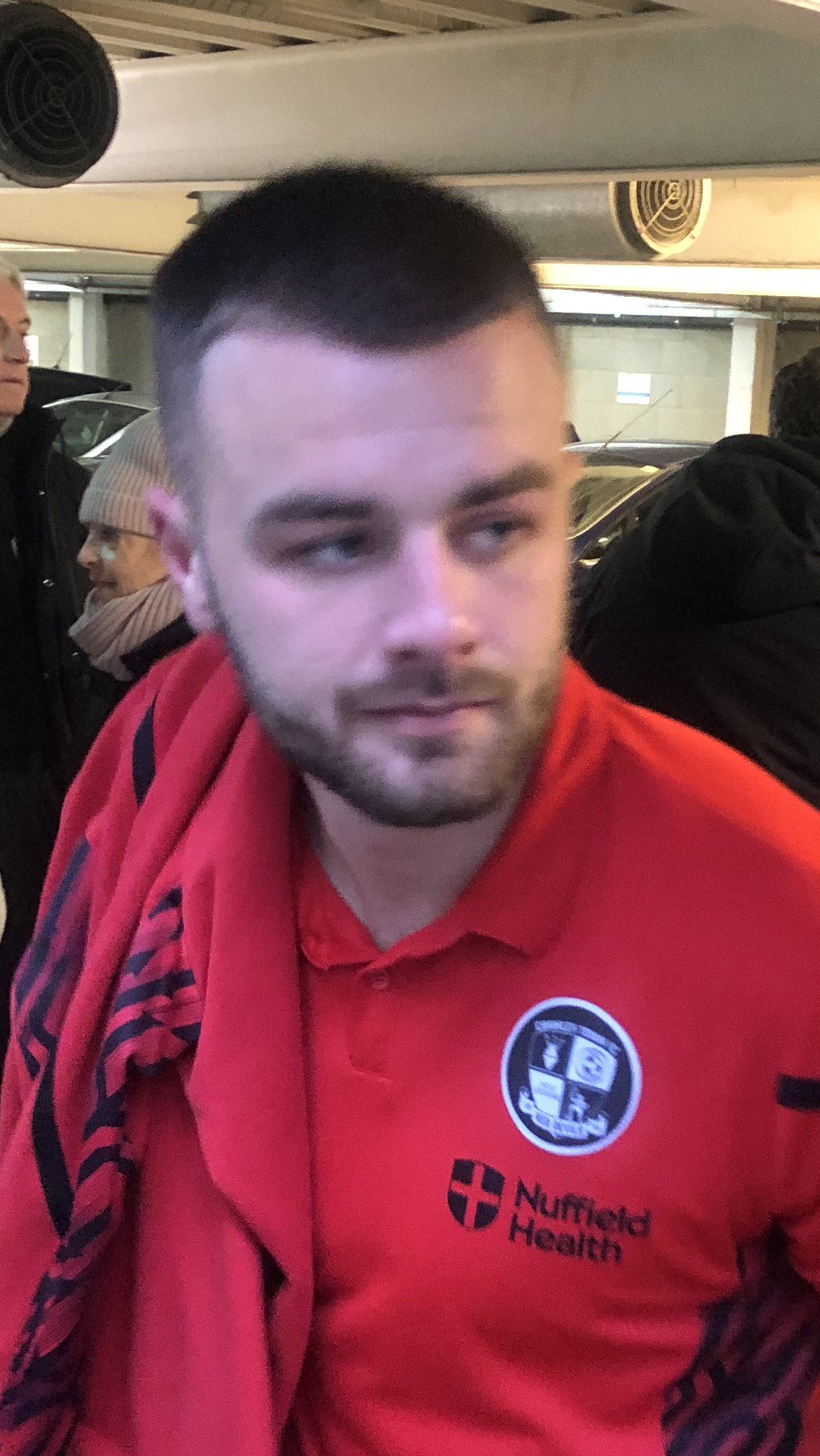
- Charlie Barker in 2024.

Personal information
- Full name: Charlie Mel Barker
- Date of birth: 12 February 2003 (age 23)
- Place of birth: Rotherham, England
- Height: 5 ft 11 in (1.80 m)
- Position: Defender

Team information
- Current team: Crawley Town
- Number: 5

Youth career
- –2020: Charlton Athletic

Senior career*
Years	Team	Apps	(Gls)
2020–2023	Charlton Athletic	3	(0)
2021	→ Wealdstone (loan)	3	(0)
2022	→ Hemel Hempstead Town (loan)	7	(0)
2022–2023	→ Wealdstone (loan)	29	(0)
2023–2024	Wealdstone	43	(2)
2024–	Crawley Town	88	(2)
- * Club domestic league appearances and goals as of 17:10, 12 September 2026 (UTC)

Charlie Mel Barker (born 12 February 2003) is an English footballer who plays as a defender for EFL League Two club Crawley Town.

== Career ==
=== Charlton Athletic ===
Barker made his senior debut for Charlton on 1 September 2020 in a 2–1 EFL Trophy defeat to AFC Wimbledon. In response to Barker's senior Charlton debut, manager Lee Bowyer said "I thought young Barker was outstanding, outstanding. He didn't put a foot wrong all night, in possession and out of possession".

In his second senior appearance, an EFL Cup tie against Swindon Town, he scored his first senior goal as his side won 3–1.

On 13 May 2023, it was announced that Barker would leave the club when his contract expired in June.

==== Wealdstone (loan) ====
On 24 September 2021, Barker joined non-league Wealdstone on a month's youth loan. He made his debut in a 1–0 away win against Kings Lynn Town, and would go on to make three appearances for the club.

==== Hemel Hempstead Town (loan) ====
On 1 September 2022, Barker joined Hemel Hempstead Town on loan until 1 January 2023.

On 28 October 2022, it was announced that Barker had been recalled early by Charlton Athletic.

==== Wealdstone (second loan) ====
On the same day Barker was recalled from Hemel Hempstead Town, he made the switch back to Wealdstone until 1 January 2023. On 3 January 2023, the loan was extended until the end of the 2022–23 season.

=== Wealdstone ===
On 30 June 2023, Barker joined Wealdstone on a permanent contract following the expiry of his deal at Charlton Athletic. On 25 November 2023, he scored his first goal for the club, heading in a 98th minute winner in a 3–2 victory over local rivals Barnet.

=== Crawley Town ===
On 24 June 2024, Barker signed for newly promoted League One club Crawley Town for an undisclosed fee, signing a three-year deal. He scored his first goal for Crawley in an EFL Trophy tie against Brighton & Hove Albion U21s on 20 August 2024. Despite the 2024–25 season ending in disappointment with relegation, Barker was named Crawley Town Player of the Season.

== Personal life ==
He is the son of former professional footballer and manager Richie Barker.

== Career statistics ==
As of match played 12 September 2026

Appearances and goals by club, season and competition
Club	Season	League			FA Cup		League Cup		Other		Total	
Club	Season	Division	Apps	Goals	Apps	Goals	Apps	Goals	Apps	Goals	Apps	Goals
Charlton Athletic	2020–21	League One	3	0	1	0	2	1	3 (Note: Three appearances in EFL Trophy)	0	9	1
Charlton Athletic	2021–22	League One	0	0	0	0	0	0	1 (Note: One appearance in EFL Trophy)	0	1	0
Charlton Athletic	2022–23	League One	0	0	0	0	0	0	1 (Note: One appearance in EFL Trophy)	0	1	0
Charlton Athletic	Charlton Athletic total		3	0	1	0	2	1	5	0	11	1
Wealdstone (loan)	2021–22	National League	3	0	0	0	—		0	0	3	0
Hemel Hempstead Town (loan)	2022–23	National League South	7	0	1	0	—		0	0	8	0
Wealdstone (loan)	2022–23	National League	29	0	—		—		1 (Note: One appearance in FA Trophy)	0	30	0
Wealdstone	2023–24	National League	43	2	1	0	—		3 (Note: Three appearances in FA Trophy)	0	47	2
Crawley Town	2024–25	League One	39	1	1	0	2	0	3 (Note: Three appearances in EFL Trophy)	1	45	2
Crawley Town	2025–26	League Two	43	1	1	0	1	0	2 (Note: Two appearances in EFL Trophy)	0	47	1
Crawley Town	2026–27	League Two	6	0	0	0	2	0	0	0	8	0
Crawley Town	Crawley Town total		88	2	2	0	5	0	5	1	100	3
Career total			173	4	5	0	7	1	14	1	199	6

== Honours ==
Individual

- Crawley Town Player of the Season: 2024–25
