= Danilo Orsi =

English footballer (born 1996)

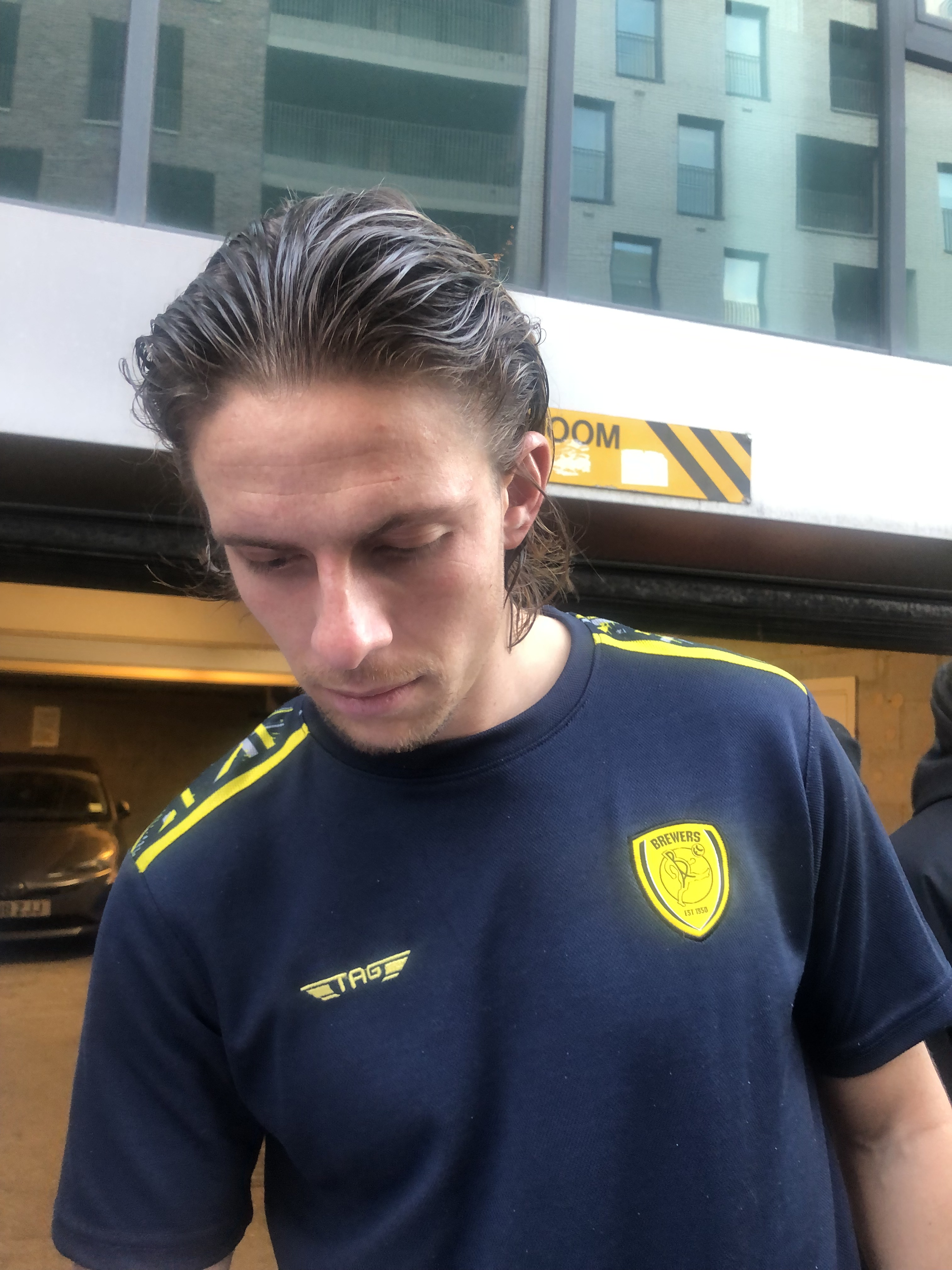
- Orsi in 2024.

Personal information
- Full name: Danilo Harley Orsi-Dadomo
- Date of birth: 19 April 1996 (age 30)
- Place of birth: Camden, England
- Height: 6 ft 2 in (1.88 m)
- Position: Striker

Team information
- Current team: Crawley Town
- Number: 9

Youth career
- Chivas USA
- Fort Lauderdale Strikers

College career
Years	Team	Apps	(Gls)
2016–2018	EFSC Titans	32	(34)

Senior career*
Years	Team	Apps	(Gls)
2013–2015	Cockfosters	20	(0)
2018	East Thurrock United	8	(2)
2018–2019	Hungerford Town	31	(9)
2019–2020	Hampton & Richmond Borough	32	(12)
2020–2021	Maidenhead United	39	(19)
2021–2022	Harrogate Town	10	(1)
2022	→ Boreham Wood (loan)	24	(2)
2022–2023	Grimsby Town	24	(2)
2023–2024	Crawley Town	45	(19)
2024–2025	Burton Albion	27	(6)
2025	→ Milton Keynes Dons (loan)	18	(3)
2025–2026	AFC Wimbledon	18	(3)
2026–	Crawley Town	25	(3)
- * Club domestic league appearances and goals as of 13:56, 22 November 2026 (UTC)

Danilo Harley Orsi-Dadomo (born 19 April 1996) is an English professional footballer who plays as a striker for EFL League Two club Crawley Town. He has also played for Harrogate Town, Grimsby Town, Burton Albion and AFC Wimbledon.

== Early and personal life ==
Born in London, Orsi was raised in Enfield and Barnet. He is of partial Italian and Scottish descent.

== Career ==
Orsi played for Cockfosters before moving to the United States and playing college soccer with Eastern Florida State College (studying business management), scoring 27 goals in 32 games across two seasons, whilst also playing at club level for Chivas U19 and Fort Lauderdale Strikers U23.

Upon his return to England, Orsi played non-league football for East Thurrock United, Hungerford Town, Hampton & Richmond Borough and Maidenhead United. He was Maidenhead's Fans' Player of the Season for the 2020–21 season.

In June 2021 he was linked with a transfer to Football League clubs Burton Albion, Bradford City and Colchester United. Later that month he signed for Football League team Harrogate Town.

On 1 January 2022, Orsi returned to the National League to join Boreham Wood on loan for the remainder of the 2021–22 season. Orsi scored his first goal for the club on his first start as he scored the only goal of the game as his side defeated Wealdstone.

=== Grimsby Town ===
In June 2022 it was announced that he would join Grimsby Town on 1 July 2022. He scored his first league goal for the club on 18 April 2023, notching the winner in a 1–0 victory over Barrow.

Orsi was part of the Grimsby team that reached the FA Cup quarter-final for the first time since 1939, he started in the 2–1 win away at Premier League side Southampton that secured that achievement.

=== Crawley Town ===
In June 2023 he transferred to Crawley Town for an undisclosed fee. On 11 May 2024, Orsi scored a hat-trick against MK Dons in the second leg of their tie in the 2023–24 EFL League Two play-offs, helping win the game 5–1 and the tie 8–1, the biggest win in EFL play-off history.

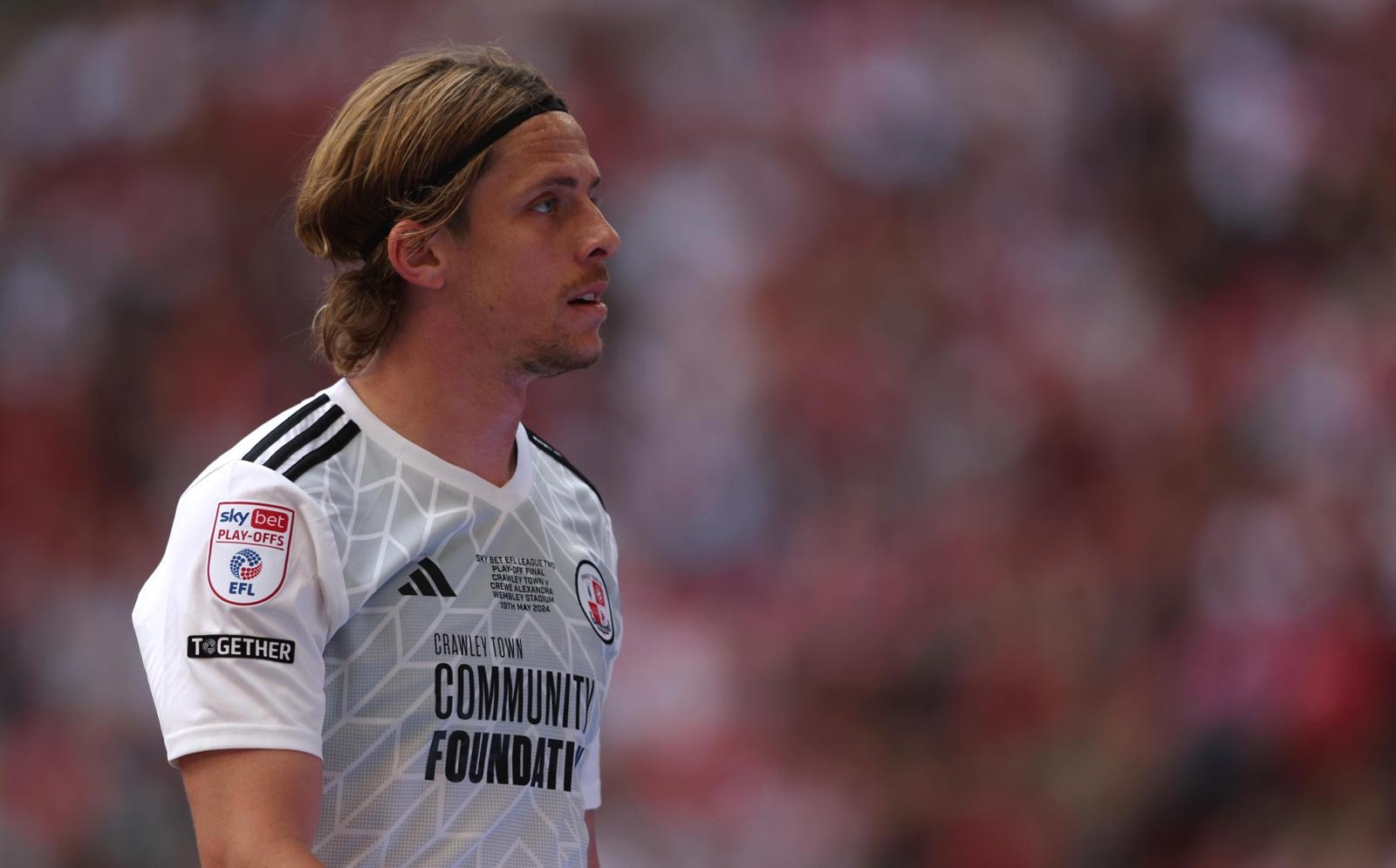
Orsi with Crawley Town.

On 19 May 2024, Orsi scored the first goal, against Crewe Alexandra, in the 2024 League Two play-off final at Wembley Stadium as Crawley won 2–0 to gain promotion to League One. He extended his contract with Crawley later that month.

=== Burton Albion ===
On 26 June 2024, Orsi signed for fellow League One side Burton Albion on a three-year deal, joining for an undisclosed fee.

On 3 February 2025, he joined League Two club Milton Keynes Dons on loan for the remainder of the season, with an option to buy included.

=== AFC Wimbledon ===
On 30 July 2025 he signed for AFC Wimbledon on a two-year contract.

=== Return to Crawley Town ===
On 11 January 2026, Orsi re-signed for Crawley Town on a two-and-a-half year contract for an undisclosed fee.

== Career statistics ==
As of match played 21 November 2026

Appearances and goals by club, season and competition
Club	Season	League			FA Cup		EFL Cup		Other		Total	
Club	Season	Division	Apps	Goals	Apps	Goals	Apps	Goals	Apps	Goals	Apps	Goals
Cockfosters	2013–14	SSML Premier Division	5	0	0	0	—		1	0	6	0
Cockfosters	2014–15	SSML Premier Division	15	0	1	0	—		7 (Note: One appearance and two goals in SSML Premier Division Cup; three appearances and one goal in London Senior Cup; one appearance in Middlesex Senior Charity Cup; and one appearance in SSML Challenge Trophy.)	3	23	3
Cockfosters	Total		20	0	1	0	0	0	8	3	29	3
East Thurrock United	2018–19	National League South	8	2	0	0	—		0	0	8	2
Hungerford Town	2018–19	National League South	31	9	1	1	—		3 (Note: One appearance in FA Trophy; two appearances and one goal in Berks & Bucks Senior Cup.)	1	35	11
Hampton & Richmond Borough	2019–20	National League South	32	12	2	1	—		5 (Note: Four appearances and two goals in FA Trophy; one appearance in Middlesex Senior Cup.)	2	39	15
Maidenhead United	2020–21	National League	39	19	1	0	—		1 (Note: Appearance in FA Trophy)	2	41	21
Harrogate Town	2021–22	League Two	10	1	1	1	0	0	3 (Note: Appearance(s) in EFL Trophy)	4	14	6
Boreham Wood (loan)	2021–22	National League	24	2	—		—		2	0	26	2
Grimsby Town	2022–23	League Two	24	2	5	1	0	0	3	1	32	4
Crawley Town	2023–24	League Two	45	19	1	2	0	0	4 (Note: One appearance in EFL Trophy, three appearances and four goals in play-offs)	4	50	25
Burton Albion	2024–25	League One	27	6	2	0	0	0	3	1	32	7
Milton Keynes Dons (loan)	2024–25	League Two	18	3	—		—		—		18	3
AFC Wimbledon	2025–26	League One	18	3	1	0	2	0	4	1	25	4
Crawley Town	2025–26	League Two	15	1	0	0	0	0	0	0	15	1
Crawley Town	2026–27	League Two	10	2	1	0	1	1	1	0	13	3
Crawley Town	Total		25	3	1	0	1	1	1	0	28	4
Career Total			321	81	16	6	3	1	37	19	377	107

== Honours ==
Crawley Town

- EFL League Two play-offs: 2024
