= Crawley Town F.C. =

English association football club

Crawley Town
- Full name: Crawley Town Football Club
- Nickname: The Red Devils
- Founded: 1896; 130 years ago
- Ground: Broadfield Stadium
- Capacity: 5,567
- Coordinates: 51.0997°N 0.1948°W
- Owner(s): KB Sports and Leisure Ltd
- Chairman: Raphael Khalili
- Head coach: Kevin Blackwell
- League: EFL League Two
- 2025–26: EFL League Two, 22nd of 24
- Website: crawleytownfc.com
Home colours	Away colours	Third colours

Crawley Town Football Club is a professional association football club based in the town of Crawley, West Sussex, England. The team currently competes in EFL League Two, the fourth level of the English football league system.

Founded in 1896 as Crawley Football Club, helped to found the West Sussex League later that year before transferring to the Mid-Sussex League. The club disbanded in 1935, but were re-established in the Brighton, Hove & District League three years later. The club switched to the Sussex County League in 1951 and then moved on to the Metropolitan League five years later. In 1958, the club changed its name to Crawley Town Football Club. The club moved from amateur to semi-professional status in 1962 and were accepted into the Southern League the following year. They secured promotion out of Division One in 1968–69, only to suffer relegation the next season.

Crawley were promoted out of the Southern League Southern Section 1983–84 and spent the next 21 seasons in the Premier Division, before winning promotion into the Conference as champions of the Southern League in 2003–04. The club turned fully professional in 2005 but faced immediate financial difficulties and entered administration the following year. The club survived and appointed Steve Evans as a manager in May 2007. Evans led them into the Football League as champions of the Conference in 2010–11 and then secured promotion in their first season in League Two. Crawley spent three seasons in League One before relegation in 2015. After nine seasons in League Two, Crawley won the League Two play-offs in 2024 to earn promotion back to League One, before being immediately relegated to League Two again the following season. The club has played home games at Broadfield Stadium since 1997 and are nicknamed the "Reds" or "Town" due to the colour of their kit.

== History ==
=== Early years ===
Having played friendly matches from 1890, with the club's first match played on 22 November 1890 at home to Lingfield, Crawley Town were formed in 1896, and became founding members of the West Sussex Football League that year, joining the Junior Division. They remained in the West Sussex league for five years before transferring to the Mid-Sussex League, winning the League in only their second season. After disbanding at the end of the 1934–35 season, the club reformed in 1938 and joined Division Two of the Brighton, Hove & District League. They played in the Sussex County Emergency League in 1945–45, before returning to the Brighton, Hove & District League in 1946–47, becoming members of Division One.

They stayed at this level until they entered the Sussex County League in 1951 before switching again five years later to the Metropolitan League, which was a competition for both professional and amateur sides. In 1958, Crawley changed their name to Crawley Town. Town retained their amateur status and went on to win the Metropolitan League Challenge Cup in 1959.

Crawley turned semi-professional in 1962 and the following year they joined Division One of the Southern League. In 1969 they were promoted to Premier Division of the Southern League but the joy was short-lived as the following season they were relegated back to the first division where they remained until the 1983–84 season when they were promoted as runners-up.

Crawley's most successful cup run at the time was in the 1991–92 season when they reached the FA Cup third round proper and played local Brighton & Hove Albion, losing 5–0 in front of 18,301 at the Goldstone Ground.

In 1999, the club entered administration with debts estimated to be around £400,000. In October 1999, the club was bought by John Duly after a period of two months in administration, with Billy Smith appointed as manager. At the time, the Reds were second-bottom, but the club went on to finish in 12th place, six points above the relegation zone, at the end of this season various players from the first and reserve teams were released to try and free up finances, including John Sawyer, Jason Davy, Daniel Cullingham, Alex Barber and Jimmy Drew who all were part of a promising reserve team at the time finishing runner-up in the reserve league to Crystal Palace reserves. Whilst the 2000–01 season saw Town finish 11th, Crawley were much improved in a 2001–02 campaign which saw them finish fourth. This season saw the return of some of the previously released players as the administrators had now found new owners. Whilst Crawley finished seventh in 2002–03, the Reds found success in the 2003–04 season, when they ended their 20-season stay in the Premier Division of the Southern League by winning the division with 84 points, 12 points clear of second-placed Weymouth, and winning the Southern League Cup for the second successive season. The title was secured with four matches remaining with a 3–0 victory at Welling United, sparking celebrations from a large travelling contingent. Crawley would now be playing in the Football Conference, the highest level of non-League football, for the first time in their history.

=== Conference ===
Chart of Crawley Town's final table positions in the football league since promotion into the Conference.

A final position of 12th in their first season in the National Division was considered an impressive achievement for the club who finished as the highest-ranked part-time team in the country. Crawley also retained the Sussex Senior Cup by defeating Ringmer.

In 2005, the SA Group bought the club and made the decision to go full-time for the first time in the club's history. Although this was necessary in order to allow them to compete in the division, it led to the departure of several key players, including fans' favourite Charlie MacDonald and goalkeeper Andy Little, who were unable to give up their day jobs to play full-time.

The 2005–06 season didn't start well for Crawley as the club found themselves third from bottom and out of the FA Cup after a shock defeat to Braintree Town. Francis Vines was subsequently sacked and replaced by former Chelsea FC manager and player John Hollins and his assistant Alan Lewer. Things got worse for Crawley and as attendances dropped, so too did the club's income; the club's owners were forced to slash the players' and staff wages by 50% due to lack of funds. Several key players left the club, including captain Ian Simpemba, Simon Wormull and record signing Daryl Clare; it looked certain that relegation was on the cards. However five straight wins through March and April saw the club climb the table to 17th place and beat the drop by 10 points. The club was docked three points at the end of the season for breaching the annual playing budget but this had no effect on the final standings and Crawley's league status was safe. However, they later went into administration, with insolvency specialists Begbies Traynor placed in control of the club.

=== Financial problems ===
Although Crawley Town F.C. had been in administration in the late 1990s, trouble began in March 2006 when the club's players and staff were made to take a 50% pay cut and the entire squad was put up for sale; Crawley went into administration in June of that year. It was revealed by local newspaper the Argus several days later that the chairman Chas Majeed was an undischarged bankrupt and therefore banned from holding a high position within the club. Majeed later resigned from his post but remained involved.

The fans started a "Red Card" campaign in order to remove Chas Majeed and his brother Azwar Majeed (Crawley Town's owner) from the club, with fans waving red cards at the Majeeds and forming a supporters' trust. It was revealed that the club was around £1.1million in debt with nearly £400,000 due to HM Revenue and Customs (HMRC), and the Majeeds claimed they were owed £700,000 by the club. By July of that year, the debts were closer to £1.4 million, including money owed to current and former staff, and an offer of 25p in the pound was rejected by the creditors. With HMRC unwilling to move on its demand and being the biggest creditor (the Majeeds were unable to vote on the matter despite being owed money), it looked unlikely that the club would be saved.

By August 2006, only one bid had come in for the club which was from the current owners; it was rejected by three to one; the administrators were therefore obliged to liquidate the club and it was announced that the club would fold later that day. However, a couple of days later, in one final attempt to rescue the club, the creditors met again to decide on a final offer. The creditors were split and so the administrator voted in Crawley Town's favour, allowing them to start the new season. The creditors would meet 14 days later to decide on an offer of 50p in the pound. The club was told that if the offer was rejected then the club would fold there and then, and there would be no going back. By September 2006 the club's debt was at £1.8 million making former/current players and staff the biggest creditors and giving hope that a rescue bid would be accepted. The offer of 50p in the pound was later accepted and Crawley Town was able to continue playing for the time being, though this didn't stop HMRC from trying to wind up the SAGroup (Majeed's company) over unpaid taxes. Azwar Majeed was later jailed for tax fraud relating to his various other businesses.

Crawley started the 2006–07 season by winning their opening three games and all but wiped out their 10-point deduction. The following month, however, the club's form dipped and this led to John Hollins and Alan Lewer losing their jobs. The news did not go down well with the fans as the pair had stuck with Crawley when others decided to leave and they had managed to lift the club off the bottom despite a 10-point deduction. They were replaced by players Ben Judge and David Woozley with the help of John Yems, the former Fulham FC and Millwall FC coach. Life started well for the trio who picked up 10 points from a possible 12. Crawley finished 18th in the division and managed to beat the drop after securing the point they needed on the final day of the season.

In May 2007, it was confirmed that all of Crawley Town's debts had been cleared. However, complications arose and as a result Crawley were given a six-point penalty for the new season and a transfer embargo was put in place because of financial irregularities. It is believed that Crawley failed to confirm to the league that the debts had been paid. For the start of the 2007–08 season, a new regime was put into place which included Victor Marley as club Chairman and Steve Evans as manager, with Paul Raynor as an assistant. Crawley finished the season in a respectable 15th place, and were runners-up in the Sussex Senior Cup, despite the club's financial position and points deduction.

In April 2008 Prospect Estate Holdings Limited took control of Crawley after buying it from the SA Group in conjunction with former owner John Duly. The club's financial worries were over and the club could look to build again and start the 2008–09 season on a level playing field.

After a short period of stability, Crawley Town ended up in the High Court in London to face a winding-up order on 17 February 2010; again this was because of money being owed to HMRC. The hearing was adjourned until 17 March 2010. The latest setback appeared to be the end of Crawley Town, as the club had very few assets to sell in order to satisfy the debt. However, the case was later dismissed by the High Court as the club proved the debt had been paid.

In a move that showed confidence in the new management, on 29 March 2010 Crawley Borough Council agreed to lease the Broadfield Stadium to Crawley Town F.C. and to help secure the long-term sustainability of the club.

=== FA Cup run and Football League ===
In 2010, Bruce Winfield announced that he and Susan Carter had become majority shareholders and had attracted new investment for the club, some of which came from overseas. The investment allowed manager Steve Evans to start rebuilding the squad, which saw 23 players signed over a six-month period including Matt Tubbs, for £70,000, Sergio Torres for a record £100,000, and Richard Brodie for an undisclosed fee, which was estimated to be a new Conference record of £275,000.

The investment paid off as Crawley were challenging for promotion to the Football League and embarked on a remarkable FA Cup run. Victories over Newport County, Guiseley and Swindon Town saw the club progress to a third round tie at home to Championship side Derby County. They won 2–1, and followed it up with a 1–0 win at League Two side Torquay United in the fourth round. The fifth round draw saw Crawley face away tie with then Premier League leaders Manchester United, with manager Steve Evans admitting it was 'the tie of his dreams'. Crawley lost the fifth round tie 1–0 in front of 9,000 Crawley fans, though were denied a draw when Richard Brodie's header hit the bar in the 93rd minute.

In March 2011, club owner Bruce Winfield died from cancer, aged 61. Despite their cup run and Winfield's death, Crawley didn't halt their progress in the league as just 19 days after Winfield's death, Crawley secured the 2010–11 Football Conference title by beating Tamworth 3–0 and reaching the Football League for the first time in the club's history.

In the 2011–12 season, they once again enjoyed success in the FA Cup, beating Championship clubs Bristol City and Hull City both 1–0 home and away respectively. They suffered a 2–0 defeat against Stoke City in the fifth round. This was Crawley's first match against Premier League opposition at the Broadfield Stadium.

Crawley finished 2011 at the top of League Two; a positive start to their first campaign in league football. However, despite continued success in the FA Cup, form slipped. Between 17 December 2011, and 13 March 2012, Crawley won just two league games out of a possible 14. Many argued the sales of Matt Tubbs and Tyrone Barnett for £800,000 and £1,100,000 respectively, as well as failing to reach a deal over Andy Drury contributed to their dip in form. Three Crawley players were involved in a post-match brawl against Bradford City, including former club captain Pablo Mills (suspended for six matches) and fellow defender Claude Davis (suspended for four matches). Five players from both clubs were suspended in total equalling the record for the most dismissals in an English game. Consequently, Crawley were fined £18,000. Following an FA inquiry into the events that took place, Kyle McFadzean was handed a four-game suspension after being found guilty of violent conduct. All three players released apology statements, and were all fined two weeks' wages. Despite apologising, Mills was stripped of his captaincy for behaviour not befitting the role of a club captain. He was released by the club at the conclusion of the 2011/12 season.

On 9 April, it was announced that Steve Evans had left Crawley to take up a post at Rotherham United. Evans revealed "In my opinion, how far can I take Crawley Town? League One certainly, but beyond that I was not so sure". Evans had previously admitted frustration over the departures of Matt Tubbs and Tyrone Barnett. Assistant manager Paul Raynor also left the club with immediate effect, with coach Craig Brewster taking over as manager for the remainder of the season. Steve Coppell was appointed as director of football with immediate effect.

On Saturday 5 May Crawley secured League One promotion, courtesy of a 67th minute Scott Neilson strike against Accrington Stanley.

It was announced on 12 May, that Crawley were in talks to appoint Sean O'Driscoll as their new manager. Under a tight budget at Doncaster Rovers he achieved promotion to the Football League Championship in his first full season. He was appointed as manager four days later. Despite Crawley chief executive Alan Williams being convinced they had made 'the perfect appointment', he left on 12 July, to become the new manager of Nottingham Forest, meaning that he did not take charge of Crawley for a single game.

On 7 August 2012, Crawley appointed Bury F.C. manager Richie Barker as their new manager. Under him, the club had a successful debut season in League One, challenging for the play-offs for much of the campaign and finishing comfortably in tenth place. The club caused controversy, however, by banning a reporter from Crawley News because the club's management disliked two of his paper's headlines. The club were condemned for this in a motion signed by 23 MPs on 10 December 2013. Barker was sacked early in the following season for speaking to League Two side Portsmouth about their manager's job. He was replaced by John Gregory, who steered the club to another mid-table finish despite a poor late run.

The 2014–15 season saw Crawley struggle for form, and Gregory resigned for health reasons near the end of 2014, with the club in the relegation zone. Dean Saunders was appointed to replace him on an interim basis, and despite an upturn in form, was unable to get the club out of trouble. On Sunday 3 May 2015, Crawley were relegated to League Two, following a 1–2 defeat at home to Coventry City. Saunders' short-term deal was not renewed after the season ended, and he was replaced by Mark Yates.

=== Return to League Two ===
While Crawley were among the pre-season promotion favourites, one win in their first 10 games quickly put paid to any such hopes. Their form improved as the season progressed, and they were 12th by 26 December. In March 2016, the club was purchased by Turkish businessman Ziya Eren, who set a target for the club to be playing in the Championship within 8–10 years. Following a run of six consecutive defeats, Yates was sacked just before the season ended, with Dermot Drummy appointed as his successor.

The 2016–17 season started strongly for the Reds. However, after drawing 3–3 at home to Carlisle United thanks to captain Jimmy Smith's late goal, Crawley only narrowly survived in League Two. On 4 May, the club sacked Drummy after a year in charge. On 27 November 2017, Drummy was found dead near the A414 in Hoddesdon, with the cause of death later confirmed to be suicide.

On 23 May 2017, former Leeds United winger Harry Kewell was appointed as head coach. Kewell led Crawley to a 14th-placed finish - their best finish since relegation from League One. Kewell left the club shortly into the 2018–19 season, to manage fellow League Two club Notts County. Gabriele Cioffi was appointed as his successor a week later and led the club to finish 19th that season.

Despite the club reaching the fourth round of the EFL Cup in the 2019–20 season, their best performance in the competition, manager Gabriele Cioffi left the club by mutual consent on 2 December 2019, with the club having won just once in 11 matches leaving the club 17th in League Two. Cioffi was replaced by former manager John Yems three days later on a deal until the end of the season. Following an upturn in the club's form, with Crawley losing just two of 11 matches, Yems' contract was extended until the end of the 2022–23 season in late January 2020. However, in March 2020, the League Two season was suspended due to the COVID-19 pandemic, with Crawley still to play a further nine games. The season was later terminated, with Crawley finishing 13th after clubs agreed to base the final table on points per game. The following season, Crawley improved one place to 12th. In the FA Cup, they reached the fourth round of the FA Cup after beating Premier League Leeds United 3–0.

=== WAGMI United ===
On 7 April 2022, it was announced that the club had been acquired by Wagmi United LLC, a group of US cryptocurrency investors. The "crypto bro" new owners promised a new approach to football club ownership, talking of building a "tight-knit community" of fans "stretching from West Sussex to anywhere in the world with an internet connection", but they quickly encountered controversy. Manager John Yems left the club in May 2022 after allegations of racist behaviour and was later banned from football until January 2026 after being found guilty of 12 charges of racist abuse towards his players. He was replaced by Kevin Betsy. After a disastrous start to the 2022–23 league season, Betsy left the club on 9 October 2022 following a 3–0 defeat to Grimsby Town which left the club bottom of the league. The reign of the next manager was even shorter; Matthew Etherington resigned in December 2022 after just 34 days in charge. Amid what The Guardian called "reckless leadership" and a "shambles", caretaker manager Darren Byfield was joined in the dugout at the 3–1 defeat to Stevenage by co-chairman Preston Johnson, who was ridiculed online by Stevenage staff for his lack of understanding of substitution rules. After Crawley fans requested a meeting with the owners, Johnson delayed, saying the club needed to get to "the bottom of sensitive legal issues". Scott Lindsey was appointed as the club's new manager on 11 January 2023. A vital 2–0 win at direct rivals Hartlepool United all but secured survival, confirmed the following week after a 0–0 draw at home to Walsall in the penultimate match of the season. The following campaign saw Crawley Town finish 7th, reaching the play-offs for the first time, where they thrashed MK Dons 8–1 on aggregate in the semi-finals, an EFL record.

In their first visit to Wembley, Crawley Town defeated Crewe Alexandra 2−0 in the League Two play-off final and were promoted to League One. On 30 May 2024, Preston Johnson announced he was standing down as co-chairman but would remain a co-owner. In the following transfer window 8 out of the 11 starters from the play-off final would depart the club. On 25 September, Lindsey joined MK Dons as manager, and was replaced by Rob Elliot, but after Elliot was sacked in March 2025 with the club 12 points from safety, Lindsey was re-appointed as manager on a contract until 2028. Crawley Town were relegated from League One on 29 April 2025 after finishing in 21st place.

=== League Two struggles ===
On 1 August 2025, a new investor syndicate, KB Sports and Leisure Limited led by Raphael Khalili, acquired full ownership of the club. While the investors in this syndicate were prior investors in the WAGMI United syndicate they represent a new smaller group which includes US Fintech VC investor Ryan Gilbert. In March 2026, after a 10-match winless streak left Crawley one point and two places above the League Two relegation places, the club sacked Scott Lindsay. On 24 March 2026, former Turkey player Colin Kazim-Richards was appointed as head coach. After helping the club avoid relegation, Kazim-Richards signed a new deal in May 2026, but, after a disastrous start to the 2026–27 season, he was sacked on 21 October 2026 with the club six points from safety at the foot of League Two. The following month, interim - later confirmed as permanent - manager Kevin Blackwell oversaw Crawley's shock FA Cup first round 2–0 defeat at non-league Wimborne Town on 8 November.

== Stadium ==
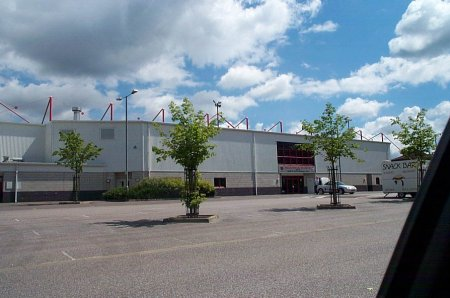
Broadfield Stadium

Crawley Town FC spent 48 years at their Town Mead home until the land was sold to developers in 1997. The club then moved to the Broadfield Stadium, about two miles across town. The stadium has a capacity of 5,996 people, and is owned by Crawley Borough Council.

In January 2012 the application for the new 2,000-seater East Stand and facilities including new turnstiles and Premier League standard floodlights was accepted by Crawley Borough Council. The upgrade was required to meet the league rules which require a minimum 5,000 capacity stadium. After just one week of construction, the new East Stand was completed on 2 April 2012, bringing the total capacity of the Broadfield Stadium to 5,500. Upon completion, Crawley's first game with the new stand was against League Two side Crewe Alexandra on 6 April. The match ended in a 1–1 draw, with a new record crowd of 4,723, the previous best being 4,522.

The record attendance reached 5,880 on 5 January 2013 when Crawley Town hosted Reading in the FA Cup.

Between 2013 and 2018, the stadium was called The Checkatrade.com Stadium as part of a sponsorship deal with the online trades comparison company Checkatrade.

== Rivalries ==
Crawley Town supporters view AFC Wimbledon as their biggest rivals, according to a 2012 survey, with Swindon Town seen as their second The AFC Wimbledon rivalry is primarily due to their reasonably close geographical proximity. As of April 2024, the sides have played each other 17 times since 2009; both teams have won seven games each, with three draws.

Also due to close proximity, a rivalry with South London side Sutton United has become the club's most recent, following crowd trouble after a tie in October 2021 which saw a late Sutton goal win the game. The teams last met in April 2024, with play-off chasing Crawley scoring a 90th minute equaliser to all but confirm Sutton’s relegation to the National League.

== Players ==
=== First-team squad ===
As of 31 August 2026

Note: Flags indicate national team as defined under FIFA eligibility rules; some limited exceptions apply. Players may hold more than one non-FIFA nationality.

No.	Pos.	Nation	Player
1	GK	ITA	Vito Mannone
2	DF	ENG	Kellan Gordon
4	DF	ESP	Pele Arganese-McDermott
5	DF	ENG	Charlie Barker
6	DF	ENG	Priestley Farquharson
7	FW	ENG	Malcolm Ebiowei
8	MF	IRL	Louie Watson
9	FW	ENG	Danilo Orsi
10	MF	GUY	Stephen Duke-McKenna
11	FW	ENG	Pemi Aderoju (on loan from Peterborough United)
12	DF	ENG	Lewis Richards
13	GK	ENG	Nicholas Michalski (on loan from Blackburn Rovers)
14	FW	ITA	Gianmarco Di Biase
16	DF	NIR	Jonny Russell
17	FW	SLE	Osman Kamara (on loan from Blackburn Rovers)

No.	Pos.	Nation	Player
19	FW	ANT	Dion Pereira
20	MF	ENG	Jude Arthurs (captain)
21	MF	IRL	Justin Ferizaj
22	FW	ENG	Ade Adeyemo
23	FW	ENG	Fate Kotey
24	DF	ENG	Akin Odimayo
25	MF	ENG	Klaudio Krasniqi
27	FW	ENG	Dylan Morgan
28	MF	ENG	Nathan Tinsdale (on loan from Hull City)
30	MF	ENG	Kai Jennings (on loan from AFC Wimbledon)
31	GK	ENG	Jackson Izquierdo
33	DF	ENG	Omari Mrisho
35	DF	ENG	Ty Ewens-Findlay (on loan from Charlton Athletic)
56	MF	ENG	Jude Robertson

=== Out on loan ===
Note: Flags indicate national team as defined under FIFA eligibility rules; some limited exceptions apply. Players may hold more than one non-FIFA nationality.

No.	Pos.	Nation	Player

== Club management ==
=== Backroom staff ===
Position	Name
Manager	(England) Kevin Blackwell
Assistant Manager	(England) Jordan Tait (interim)
Goalkeeping Coach	(Italy) Vito Mannone
Analyst	(Northern Ireland) Conor McGaharan
Head of Performance	(England) Ricky McFarlane
Physio	(England) Ellie Wallis
Kit Manager	(England) Alan Denman

=== Manager history ===
Table of Crawley Town managers from 1978 to present
Name	From	To	Ref.
John Maggs	1978	1990	
Brian Sparrow	1990	1992	
Steve Wicks	1992	1993	
Ted Shepherd	1993	1995	
Colin Pates	1995	1996	
Billy Smith	1997	1999	
Cliff Cant	1999	2000	
Billy Smith	2000	2003	
Francis Vines	2003	2005	
John Hollins	2005	2006	
David Woozley, Ben Judge and John Yems (joint caretaker)	2006	2007	
Steve Evans	28 May 2007	9 April 2012	
Craig Brewster (caretaker)	9 April 2012	16 May 2012	
Sean O'Driscoll	16 May 2012	19 July 2012	
Richie Barker	7 August 2012	27 November 2013	
John Gregory	3 December 2013	27 December 2014	
Dean Saunders (caretaker)	27 December 2014	13 May 2015	
Mark Yates	19 May 2015	25 April 2016	
Dermot Drummy	27 April 2016	4 May 2017	
Harry Kewell	23 May 2017	31 August 2018	
Gabriele Cioffi	7 September 2018	2 December 2019	
John Yems	5 December 2019	23 April 2022 (Note: Yems was suspended indefinitely as manager on 23 April 2022, and was later sacked on 6 May.)	
Lewis Young (caretaker)	23 April 2022	6 June 2022	
Kevin Betsy	6 June 2022	9 October 2022	
Lewis Young (caretaker)	9 October 2022	27 November 2022	
Matthew Etherington	27 November 2022	29 December 2022	
Darren Byfield (caretaker)	30 December 2022	11 January 2023	
Scott Lindsey	11 January 2023	25 September 2024	
Ben Gladwin (caretaker)	26 September 2024	1 October 2024	
Rob Elliot	1 October 2024	19 March 2025	
Scott Lindsey	21 March 2025	22 March 2026	
Colin Kazim-Richards	24 March 2026	21 October 2026	
Kevin Blackwell	22 October 2026	present	

== Records ==
- Best FA Cup performance: 5th round, 2010–11, 2011–12
- Best EFL Cup performance: 4th round, 2019–20
- Best EFL Trophy performance: Quarter-finals, 2014–15
- Best FA Trophy performance: Quarter-finals, 2007–08

== Honours ==
League

- League Two (level 4)
  - Third place, promoted: 2011–12
  - Play-off winners: 2024
- Conference (level 5)
  - Champions: 2010–11
- Southern League (level 6)
  - Champions: 2003–04

Cup

- Southern League Cup
  - Winners: 2002–03, 2003–04
- Metropolitan League Cup
  - Winners: 1958–59
- Sussex Senior Challenge Cup
  - Winners: 1989–90, 1990–91, 2002–03, 2004–05
