= Mark Wells (footballer) =

English footballer

Personal information
- Full name: Mark Anthony Wells
- Date of birth: 15 October 1971 (age 55)
- Place of birth: Leicester, England
- Position: Defender

Youth career
- Notts County

Senior career*
Years	Team	Apps	(Gls)
1990–1993	Notts County	2	(0)
1993–1994	Huddersfield Town	22	(4)
1994–1997	Scarborough	62	(3)
1995	→ Dagenham & Redbridge (loan)		
1997–1998	Gateshead	24	(0)
1998–1999	Worcester City		
1999	Harrogate Town		
1999–xxxx	Hinckley Town		
2003–200x	Pickering Town		
- * Club domestic league appearances and goals

Mark Anthony Wells (born 15 October 1971 in Leicester) is an English former professional footballer who played as a defender in the Football League for Notts County, Huddersfield Town and Scarborough, and in non-league football for clubs including Dagenham & Redbridge, Gateshead, Worcester City, Harrogate Town, Hinckley Town and Pickering Town.
