= Dylan Morgan (footballer) =

English footballer (born 2002)

Personal information
- Full name: Dylan James Morgan
- Date of birth: 20 September 2002 (age 24)
- Positions: Midfielder; forward

Team information
- Current team: Crawley Town
- Number: 27

Youth career
- Southampton
- Forest Green Rovers
- 2021–2022: Swansea City

Senior career*
Years	Team	Apps	(Gls)
2022–2024	Taunton Town	59	(11)
2024	Yeovil Town	27	(4)
2024	→ Weston-super-Mare (loan)	4	(3)
2024–2026	Torquay United	54	(13)
2026–	Crawley Town	10	(5)
- * Club domestic league appearances and goals as of 21:16, 1 November 2026 (UTC)

Dylan James Morgan (born 20 September 2002) is an English professional footballer who plays as a midfielder or forward for EFL League Two club Crawley Town.

He has previously played in non-league with Taunton Town, Yeovil Town, Weston-super-Mare and Torquay United.

== Career ==
=== Early career ===
After spending time with Southampton and Forest Green Rovers's academies, Morgan joined Swansea City's under-23 side on a one-year deal in summer 2021.

Morgan signed for Taunton Town in summer 2022, ahead of their first season in the National League South, having featured for them during pre-season. He scored 8 goals in his first season for the club, across 48 appearances, many of which came as a substitute. He then scored 5 goals in 19 league matches in the first half on the 2023–24 season, before signing for fellow National League South club Yeovil Town in January 2024 for an undisclosed fee, and scored four in 16 games as Yeovil earned promotion back to the National League that season.

After picking up an injury during pre-season for the 2024–25 season, he joined National League South club Weston Super Mare on a three-month loan on 30 August 2024 to regain sharpness. He scored five minutes into his debut for the club the following day as Weston-super-Mare beat Hornchurch 3–2, and after three goals in four games for the club, he was recalled from his loan on 28 September.

=== Torquay United ===
On 20 December 2024, Morgan signed for National League South club Torquay United, on a contract until May 2026. He made 10 appearances for the club before picking up an injury that ruled him out for the rest of the 2024–25 season.

Morgan performed impressively during pre-season for the 2025–26 season, and scored his first goal for the club on 19 August, with a long-distance strike in the 15th minute of a 3–1 win over AFC Totton. He would go on to score 13 goals in 40 league appearances during the regular league season, including a hat-trick against Bath City in April, as Torquay finished 3rd, four points off of league winners Worthing. He also played in both of Torquay's play-off games as the club lost the National League South play-off final to Hornchurch. He made four appearances for Torquay at the start of the 2026–27 season.

=== Crawley Town ===
On 28 August 2026, Morgan joined EFL League Two club Crawley Town on a two-year contract for an undisclosed fee. Morgan made his debut as a half-time substitute against Bristol Rovers on 29 August, and made his first start away to Northampton Town three days later. He scored his first goal for the club on 12 September in a 3–1 home defeat to Cheltenham Town, and he went on to score four goals on four consecutive league games in October.

== Style of play ==
Morgan played largely as a winger for Torquay United, and during the start of his time at Crawley Town, he played in a range of attacking positions, including as an attacking midfielder, winger or as a centre forward.
