= Pemi Aderoju =

English footballer (born 2004)

Personal information
- Full name: Oluwalopemiwa Adedunmola Aderoju
- Date of birth: 5 May 2004 (age 22)
- Height: 6 ft 1 in (1.85 m)
- Position: Forward

Team information
- Current team: Crawley Town (on loan from Peterborough United)
- Number: 11

Senior career*
Years	Team	Apps	(Gls)
2022–2023	Kempston Rovers	23	(4)
2023–2024	Biggleswade	7	(4)
2024–	Peterborough United	19	(1)
2024–2025	→ Boston United (loan)	22	(1)
2025	→ Farnborough (loan)	1	(0)
2025	→ Eastbourne Borough (loan)	24	(15)
2026–	→ Crawley Town (loan)	3	(1)
- * Club domestic league appearances and goals as of 21:45, 10 July 2026 (BST)

Oluwalopemiwa Adedunmola Aderoju (born 5 May 2004) is an English professional footballer who plays as a forward for EFL League Two club Crawley Town on loan from EFL League One club Peterborough United.

== Career ==
Aderoju was educated at Bedford Modern School. He played non-League football for Kempston Rovers and Biggleswade. On 5 January 2024, he signed an 18-month contract with Peterborough United following a trial spell. He made his debut in EFL League One on 10 February, when he came on as an 87th-minute substitute for Archie Collins in a 5–2 defeat at Wycombe Wanderers. He said "I thank God that I have been able to get to this point and hopefully it is the first of many appearances at this level".

On 25 January 2025, following a spell with Boston United, Aderoju joined National League South side Farnborough on loan for the remainder of the season.

On 7 July 2025, Aderoju joined National League South side Eastbourne Borough on a season-long loan. After a successful first half of the 2025–26 season, with 20 goals in 28 games, Aderoju was recalled from his loan spell at Eastbourne Borough.

On 7 February 2026, Aderoju scored his first league goal for Peterborough United in a 6–1 thrashing of Wigan Athletic. The following month, he signed a new long-term contract with the club.

On 10 July 2026, he signed for EFL League Two club Crawley Town on a season-long loan.

== Personal life ==
Born in England, Aderoju is of Nigerian descent.

== Career statistics ==
As of match played 17 February 2026

Appearances and goals by club, season and competition
Club	Season	League			FA Cup		EFL Cup		Other		Total	
Club	Season	Division	Apps	Goals	Apps	Goals	Apps	Goals	Apps	Goals	Apps	Goals
Kempston Rovers	2021–22	Southern League; Division One Central	1	1	0	0	—		0	0	1	1
Kempston Rovers	2022–23	Southern League; Division One Central	22	3	1	1	—		4 (Note: 1 appearance in the FA Trophy and 3 appearances in the Bedfordshire Senior Cup)	0	27	4
Kempston Rovers	Total		23	4	1	1	—		4	0	28	5
Biggleswade	2023–24	Southern League; Division One Central	7	4	3	6	—		2 (Note: Appearance(s) in the FA Trophy)	2	12	12
Peterborough United	2023–24	EFL League One	2	0	0	0	0	0	0	0	2	0
Peterborough United	2024–25	EFL League One	0	0	0	0	0	0	0	0	0	0
Peterborough United	2025–26	EFL League One	9	1	0	0	0	0	0	0	9	1
Peterborough United	Total		11	1	0	0	0	0	0	0	11	1
Boston United (loan)	2024–25	National League	22	1	2	1	—		5 (Note: 3 appearances and 1 goal in National League Cup, 2 appearances in FA Trophy)	1	29	3
Farnborough (loan)	2024–25	National League South	1	0	0	0	—		0	0	1	0
Eastbourne Borough (loan)	2025–26	National League South	24	15	3	5	—		1	0	28	20
Career total			88	25	9	13	0	0	12	3	109	41
