= Nicholas Michalski =

English footballer

Nicolas Michalski
Personal information
- Full name: Nicolas Michal Michalski
- Date of birth: 14 March 2007 (age 19)
- Place of birth: Manchester, England
- Height: 1.88 m (6 ft 2 in)
- Position: Goalkeeper

Team information
- Current team: Crawley Town
- Number: 13

Youth career
- Stoke City
- 2018–2024: Blackburn Rovers

Senior career*
Years	Team	Apps	(Gls)
2024–	Blackburn Rovers	0	(0)
2024	→ Bamber Bridge (loan)	9	(0)
2024	→ City of Liverpool (loan)	10	(0)
2026–	→ Crawley Town (loan)	3	(0)

International career^{‡}
2022	England U16	1	(0)
2023	England U17	1	(0)
2024	England U18	3	(0)
2025–	England U19	3	(0)
- * Club domestic league appearances and goals as of 22:10, 29 August 2026 (UTC) ‡ National team caps and goals as of 02:16, 27 November 2025 (UTC)

Nicolas Michal Michalski (born 14 March 2007) is an English professional footballer who plays as a goalkeeper for EFL League Two club Crawley Town, on loan from Blackburn Rovers.

== Club career ==
Michalski joined the youth academy of Blackburn Rovers as a U12, after going through Stoke City's academy. On 15 May 2023, he was promoted from their academy and signed his first scholarship deal with Blackburn Rovers. On 18 March 2024, he signed his first professional contract with Blackburn for 2 seasons. On 29 July 2024, he joined Bamber Bridge on a short-term loan in the Northern Premier League. He made 11 appearances with Bamber Bridge, before he was recalled from his loan by Blackburn Rovers on 25 September 2025. On 20 October 2024, he joined City of Liverpool on another short-term loan in the Northern Premier League until January 2025.

On 7 January 2025, Michalski extended his contract with Blackburn for 2 seasons. On 12 August 2025, again he extended his contract with Blackburn Rovers until 2029, with an option to extend for an additional year. That same day he made his senior debut with Blackburn Rovers in a 2–1 EFL Cup loss to Bradford City.

On 1 August 2026, Michalski joined EFL League Two side Crawley Town on a season long loan, alongside teammate Osman Kamara.

== International career ==
Born in England, Michalski is of Polish descent and holds dual British and Polish citizenship. On 4 October 2024, he was called up to the England U18s for a set of friendlies. In November 2025, he was called up to the England U19s for a set of 2026 UEFA European Under-19 Championship qualification matches.
