= James R. Ward =

US Navy Medal of Honor recipient (1921–1941)

James Richard Ward
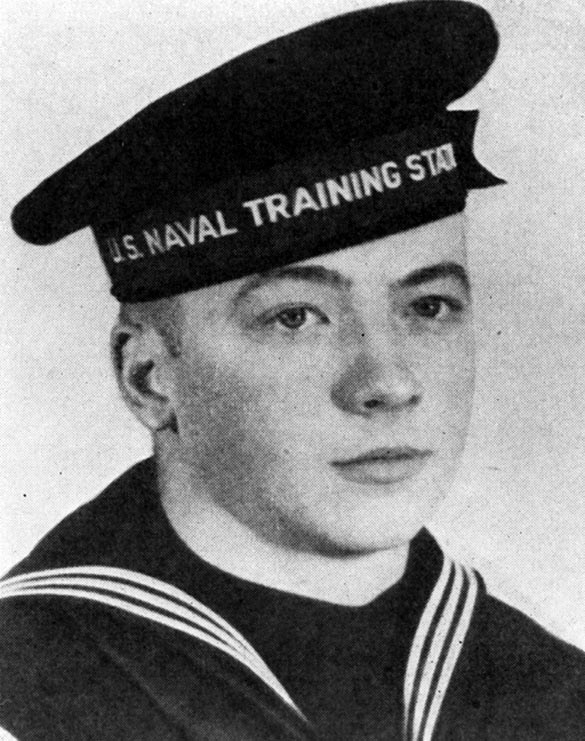
- Seaman First Class James R. Ward, Medal of Honor recipient
- Born: September 10, 1921; Springfield, Ohio, US
- Died: December 7, 1941 (aged 20); Pearl Harbor, Territory of Hawaii
- Burial place: Arlington National Cemetery
- Military career
- Allegiance: United States
- Branch: United States Navy
- Service years: 1940 – 1941
- Rank: Seaman First Class
- Unit: USS Oklahoma
- Conflicts: World War II: Attack on Pearl Harbor †
- Awards: Medal of Honor

James Richard Ward (September 10, 1921 – December 7, 1941) was a US Navy sailor who was posthumously awarded the Medal of Honor for his actions during the attack on Pearl Harbor.

== Biography ==
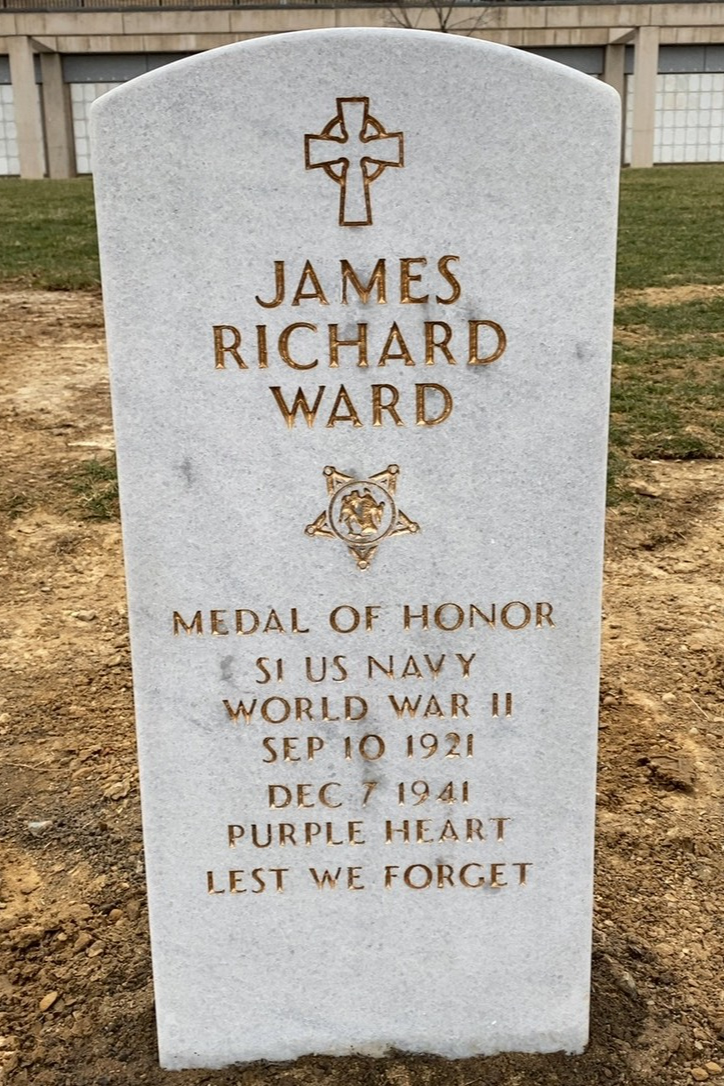
Grave at Arlington National Cemetery

Ward enlisted in the United States Navy at Cincinnati, Ohio, on November 25, 1940. After basic training, he reported on board the battleship USS Oklahoma (BB-37).

When the Japanese attacked Pearl Harbor on December 7, 1941, Oklahoma took three torpedoes soon after the attack began. She listed dangerously, and it was soon apparent that she would capsize. The order was given to abandon ship, but Seaman First Class Ward remained in a turret holding a flashlight, thus sacrificing his own life to permit other members of the crew to escape. For his heroism at that time, he posthumously received the Medal of Honor.

On August 19, 2021, the Defense POW/MIA Accounting Agency identified the remains of Seaman First Class James Richard Ward. His remains were interred in Arlington National Cemetery on 21 December 2023. He was listed in the Courts of the Missing, Honolulu Memorial, National Memorial Cemetery of the Pacific, Honolulu, Hawaii. A rosette has been placed next to his name, signifying he has been located. A cenotaph has been placed in Ferncliff Cemetery, in his hometown of Springfield, Ohio.

== Awards and honors ==

Medal of Honor		Purple Heart
American Defense Service Medal w/ Fleet clasp	Asiatic-Pacific Campaign Medal w/ campaign star	World War II Victory Medal

=== Medal of Honor citation ===
For conspicuous devotion to duty, extraordinary courage and complete disregard of his life, above and beyond the call of duty, during the attack on the Fleet in Pearl Harbor by Japanese forces on 7 December 1941. When it was seen that the U.S.S. Oklahoma was going to capsize and the order was given to abandon ship, Ward remained in a turret holding a flashlight so the remainder of the turret crew could see to escape, thereby sacrificing his own life.

=== Namesake ===
In 1943, the destroyer escort USS J. Richard Ward (DE-243), was named in honor of Seaman First Class Ward.

== See also ==
- List of Medal of Honor recipients for World War II
