= Klaudio Krasniqi =

English footballer

Personal information
- Full name: Klaudio Krasniqi
- Date of birth: 26 December 2000 (age 25)
- Place of birth: London, England
- Height: 1.74 m (5 ft 9 in)
- Position: Defensive midfielder

Team information
- Current team: Walton & Hersham (on loan from Crawley Town)
- Number: 4

Youth career
- 2010–2016: Ballers Academy
- 2016–2018: Phoenix Sports
- 2018–2019: Bromley

Senior career*
Years	Team	Apps	(Gls)
2019–2020	Lordswood	13	(0)
2019	→ Metrogas (loan)	1	(1)
2020	Erith & Belvedere	3	(0)
2020–2021	Groundhoppers	16	(6)
2021–2022	Phoenix Sports	3	(0)
2021	→ FC Knighted (loan)	3	(3)
2022–2023	Bermondsey Town	3	(0)
2023	Groundhoppers	7	(5)
2023–2024	Kent United	10	(1)
2024	→ Groundhoppers (loan)	2	(2)
2024–2026	Glacis United	34	(10)
2025	→ FC Magpies (loan)	0	(0)
2026–	Crawley Town	6	(0)
2026–	→ Walton & Hersham (loan)	1	(0)
- * Club domestic league appearances and goals as of 21 November 2026

Klaudio Krasniqi (born 26 December 2000) is an English association footballer who plays as a defensive midfielder for Walton & Hersham on loan from Crawley Town.

== Career ==
Krasniqi was a member of Ballers Academy in South London and is listed by the academy as one of its graduates. During his time with the academy, he participated in matches against the youth teams of Galatasaray and Beşiktaş in Turkey, Chicago Fire in the United States, and FC Porto in Portugal. He later joined Phoenix Sports and subsequently Bromley. After spending the early years of his senior career playing for clubs in the Southern Counties East Football League, Kent County League and Orpington and Bromley District League, he moved to Gibraltar in 2024 following a successful trial with Glacis United. After two seasons with the club, including a brief loan spell with FC Magpies during which he played in the UEFA Conference League, he joined EFL League Two club Crawley Town in July 2026. He made his debut on 15 August 2026, in an opening day home defeat to Crewe Alexandra. On 20 November 2026, Krasniqi joined National League South club Walton & Hersham on a one-month loan deal.
