= Gianmarco Di Biase =

Italian footballer (born 2005)

Personal information
- Date of birth: 26 November 2005 (age 20)
- Place of birth: Empoli, Italy
- Position: Winger

Team information
- Current team: Crawley Town
- Number: 14

Youth career
- –2019: Empoli
- 2019–2022: Pistoiese

Senior career*
Years	Team	Apps	(Gls)
2022–2023	Pistoiese	21	(8)
2023–2026	Juventus	0	(0)
2023–2026	Juventus Next Gen	0	(0)
2023	→ Pistoiese (loan)	15	(4)
2025	→ Pergolettese (loan)	6	(0)
2025–2026	→ Bra (loan)	14	(2)
2026–	Crawley Town	7	(1)
- * Club domestic league appearances and goals as of 10:00, 29 October 2026 (UTC)

Gianmarco Di Biase (born 26 November 2005) is an Italian professional footballer who plays as a winger for EFL League Two club Crawley Town.

== Club career ==
=== Early career and Pistoiese ===
Born in Empoli, Di Biase started playing football at the eponymous local club, before joining Pistoiese in 2019. Having come through the club's youth ranks, in March 2022 he took part in the Torneo di Viareggio with the under-18 squad.

The following summer, Di Biase was officially promoted to Pistoiese's first team; he subsequently made his senior debut on 28 August 2022, aged 16, starting in a 2–1 Coppa Italia Serie D win over Aglianese. With the appointment of new manager Luigi Consonni, Di Biase saw his playing time increase: he went on to score his first senior goal on 30 October 2022, opening the score-sheet in a 2–4 Serie D win over Salsomaggiore. In the process, he became Pistoiese's youngest goalscorer since 1937. He made a total amount of 36 appearances for the Pistoia-based club, scoring 12 goals and three assists.

=== Juventus ===
Having attracted the interest of several Serie A teams during the first part of the 2022–23 season, on 31 January 2023 Di Biase officially joined Juventus for a reported €350.000 transfer fee, being subsequently sent back on loan at Pistoiese until the end of the campaign. As part of the agreement between the two clubs, he was set to join Juventus's Next Gen team once the deal would be activated.

In September 2023, Di Biase suffered an anterior cruciate ligament injury on his debut for Juventus's under-19 team, and was ruled out for the rest of the first half of the season. He returned to training in January 2024.

==== Loan to Pergolettese ====
On 1 February 2025, Di Biase was loaned to Pergolettese in Serie C.

==== Loan to Bra ====
On 26 August 2025, Di Biase moved on loan to Bra in Serie C.

=== Crawley Town ===
On 10 July 2026, Di Biase joined EFL League Two club Crawley Town on a two-year contract with the option for a third.

== Personal life ==
He has an older brother, Leonardo (born in 2000).

== Career statistics ==
=== Club ===
As of match played 14 May 2023

Club	Season	League			Cup		Other		Total	
Club	Season	Division	Apps	Goals	Apps	Goals	Apps	Goals	Apps	Goals
Pistoiese	2022–23	Serie D	36	12	2	0	0	0	38	12
Career total			36	12	2	0	0	0	38	12
