= Jonny Russell =

Northern Irish footballer (born 2004)

Personal information
- Full name: Jonathan Edward Russell
- Date of birth: 19 September 2004 (age 22)
- Place of birth: Larne, Northern Ireland
- Height: 6 ft 1 in (1.85 m)
- Position: Defender

Team information
- Current team: Crawley Town
- Number: 16

Youth career
- –2023: Glentoran

Senior career*
Years	Team	Apps	(Gls)
2023–2026	Glentoran	59	(1)
2023	→ Dundela (loan)		
2026–	Crawley Town	4	(0)

International career^{‡}
2024–	Northern Ireland U21	7	(0)
- * Club domestic league appearances and goals as of 23:21, 28 January 2026 (UTC) ‡ National team caps and goals as of 12:15, 3 January 2026 (UTC)

Jonathan Edward Russell (born 19 September 2004) is a Northern Irish professional footballer who plays as a defender for EFL League Two club Crawley Town, and the Northern Ireland national under-21 team.

== Club career ==
=== Glentoran ===
Russell was born in Larne on 19 September 2004 as the son of former Glentoran footballer Jeff Russell. He progressed through the youth ranks at Glentoran, having joined the club's youth set-up aged 10.

He spent the second half of the 2022–23 season on loan at Dundela, having made his first-team debut for Glentoran in the Northern Ireland Football League Cup earlier that season.

He signed his first professional contract with Glentoran in November 2023, valid until 2026, after five NIFL Premiership appearances in the early stages of the 2023–24 season, leaving his apprenticeship with Northern Ireland Electricity in the process. The 2023–24 season was a "breakthrough campaign" for Russell, as he made 26 Premiership appearances in total for Glentoran, and won the club's Player of the Year award at the end of the season. He was the youngest winner of the award in the club's history.

He played less regularly in the first half of the 2024–25 season due to "injury and illness and the form of Danny Amos at left-back", though he did also play at right-back during this period. He ended the 2024–25 season having made 20 Premiership appearances, and made 13 league appearances in the first half of the 2025–26 season.

=== Crawley Town ===
On 3 January 2026, Russell signed for EFL League Two club Crawley Town for an undisclosed fee, on a contract of undisclosed length. It had been reported three days prior by Belfast Telegraph that the fee was to be £100,000.

== International career ==
He has represented Northern Ireland internationally at under-21 level. He was given his first call-up to the under-21 team in March 2024, for a 2025 U21 Euro qualifier against Serbia. He made his debut coming on as a substitute for the final 15 minutes as Northern Ireland won 2–1.
