= Kevin Blackwell =

English association football player

Personal information
- Full name: Kevin Patrick Blackwell
- Date of birth: 21 December 1958 (age 67)
- Place of birth: Luton, England
- Height: 5 ft 11 in (1.80 m)
- Position: Goalkeeper

Team information
- Current team: Crawley Town (manager)

Youth career
- Cambridge United

Senior career*
Years	Team	Apps	(Gls)
- Bedford Town
- Barton Rovers
- Middlesex Wanderers
1979–1980	Barnet	25	(0)
1980–1986	Boston United	227	(0)
1986	Barnet	5	(0)
1986–1989	Scarborough	69	(0)
1989–1993	Notts County	0	(0)
1993	Torquay United	18	(0)
1993–1995	Huddersfield Town	5	(0)
1995–1997	Plymouth Argyle	24	(0)
1999–2000	Sheffield United	0	(0)
Total		373	(0)

Managerial career
- 2004–2006: Leeds United
- 2007–2008: Luton Town
- 2008–2010: Sheffield United
- 2012–2013: Bury
- 2022–2023: Nakhon Ratchasima
- 2024: Lechia Gdańsk (caretaker)
- 2026–: Crawley Town
- * Club domestic league appearances and goals

Kevin Patrick Blackwell (born 21 December 1958) is an English professional football manager, executive and former player who is the manager of EFL League Two club Crawley Town.

== Playing career ==
Blackwell was born in Luton and began his football career as an apprentice at Cambridge United, with Ron Atkinson as his manager. After failing to make the grade at the Abbey Stadium, he moved into Non-League football, playing for Bedford Town while working as a bricklayer. He later played in the 1978 FA Vase final for Barton Rovers and for Middlesex Wanderers before being signed by Barnet.

In 1980, he moved to Boston United for a fee of £5,000, saving a penalty at Wembley in the 1985 FA Trophy final. He returned to Barnet in 1986 before Neil Warnock signed him for Scarborough in November the same year.

That season saw Scarborough promoted to the Football League and Blackwell remained at the club for their first two league seasons, making 44 league appearances in addition to those made in the Conference. Warnock moved to Notts County in January 1989, and in November of that year he returned to Scarborough to sign Blackwell for £15,000. In just over 3 years at Meadow Lane, Blackwell never made a league appearance, and in January 1993, when Warnock took over at Torquay United, Blackwell followed him, playing 18 league games in a successful battle to stay in the Football League.

== Coaching career ==
=== Coaching under Warnock ===
At the end of the season, Warnock moved to Huddersfield Town and in August 1993, Blackwell once again joined him, this time taking on coaching duties in addition to his playing role. His playing opportunities were limited to three full league appearances, plus another two as a substitute.

In August 1995, Blackwell followed Warnock to Plymouth Argyle on a free transfer and was appointed player-youth coach. Warnock left in February 1997, but Blackwell remained at Argyle, working as assistant manager to Mick Jones. He remained registered as a player, solely as a precautionary measure, but in March 1998 returned to full-time training as emergency cover for Argyle's only keeper Jon Sheffield. He was never called upon and ended his career after 24 league appearances for Argyle.

In June 1998, Jones was dismissed after Plymouth's relegation, and a month later Blackwell also left the club due to new manager Kevin Hodges wanting to appoint his own management team.

By now Neil Warnock was manager of Bury, and Blackwell was soon appointed goalkeeping coach at Bury, eventually becoming assistant manager. In December 1999, Warnock was appointed manager of Sheffield United and took Blackwell with him as his assistant.

=== Leeds United ===
Blackwell left Sheffield United for Leeds United to join Peter Reid as his Assistant Manager in 2003. He remained in this role under Eddie Gray following Reid's dismissal before taking over as manager of Leeds in the summer 2004 following the club's relegation from the Premiership. Handed the task of rebuilding Leeds' team after huge debts forced the jettisoning of its highly paid stars, Blackwell made a record number of signings for the club in 2004–05. He focused on value for money, buying players that, while talented, had not made the highest grade. Blackwell led the side to challenge for the playoffs, before a run of draws slowed progress, leaving Leeds in mid-table.

In the summer of 2005 Blackwell was given financial backing and bought some high-profile players for the new season. Strikers Richard Cresswell, Rob Hulse and Robbie Blake arrived, while USA winger Eddie Lewis also joined. Blackwell's shrewd tactics away from Elland Road and attacking style at home (where 9 out of 10 matches were won) proved very effective and, by the end of February, Blackwell had guided Leeds to 3rd spot, with automatic promotion remaining a possibility. The Leeds team, however, then produced some distinctly average performances and settled for their play-off place.

Blackwell took his Leeds team into the Championship play-off final, after beating Preston North End 3–1 on aggregate in the semi-finals. However, Leeds lost the final 3–0 to Watford on 21 May 2006. A string of bad results followed in both pre-season and the start of the 2006–07 and on 20 September his contract was terminated. As Blackwell left the club, Leeds were lying 23rd in the table, with seven points from eight games. After leaving Leeds, Blackwell travelled around Europe going to big-name clubs such as Real Madrid and Internazionale acquiring knowledge of further training techniques to help him with his management career. On 20 November, he announced he was suing Leeds for wrongful dismissal after it was confirmed he was sacked for gross misconduct on the grounds of "negative comments made in the press about the club's finances".

=== Luton Town ===
On 27 March 2007, Blackwell was announced as the new manager of Luton Town and began his tenure with a draw against Burnley. Luton were already in the bottom three when Blackwell took over and were 9 points from safety with 3 games to go. Blackwell set about rebuilding the side, his priority to get in some experience. To achieve this he sold centre back Leon Barnett to West Bromwich Albion, and defender Kevin Foley to Wolves, as well as releasing centre-back Russ Perrett and £500,000 signing Adam Boyd, who went on to score 14 goals that season for Leyton Orient. He also lost Markus Heikkinen on a free transfer. In replacement he brought in high-profile players such as Paul Peschisolido, Chris Perry, Don Hutchison, Paul McVeigh and Paul Furlong. He also signed some younger players in Alan Goodall, Richard Jackson and Dave Edwards.

The club entered administration in late 2007, and in January 2008 Blackwell announced he would leave Luton after working a month's notice. However, he was sacked a week after making this statement.

=== Sheffield United ===
Blackwell, took the position of Sheffield United manager, replacing Bryan Robson on 14 February 2008 on a contract until the end of the season, assisted by his former Luton Town assistant Sam Ellis. After Sheffield United's 2–0 defeat at home to Charlton Athletic on 1 March, Blackwell was critical of his team's performance, describing it as "insipid" and "embarrassing" in an interview on BBC Radio Sheffield. The team later went on a five-game unbeaten run drawing at Ipswich Town and winning four in a row against Plymouth Argyle, Coventry City, Norwich City and Barnsley to improve his chances of landing the job permanently. The streak ended with a 3–1 defeat against Preston North End. In his first Sheffield derby as manager, the Blades came from 2–0 down against Sheffield Wednesday to draw 2–2 and rescue a point. In the penultimate game of the season, the Blades won 2–1 against Bristol City. With one game remaining in the season, United remained in with a chance of making the play offs. Sheffield United lost 3–2 on the last day of the season against Southampton and finished ninth, four points off the final playoff place.

Blackwell had agreed a new three-year contract with Sheffield United in May 2008, shortly before their match against Southampton.

In the 2008–09 season, Blackwell took Sheffield United to The Championship play off final after defeating Preston North End 2–1 over two legs. Sheffield United lost the final 1–0 against Burnley.

On 14 August 2010, after losing 3–0 to Queens Park Rangers, the club website confirmed that Blackwell had left the club by mutual consent.

=== Bury ===
It was announced on 26 September 2012 that Blackwell had been appointed as manager of League One club Bury. Blackwell began his tenure with a 2–2 draw at Stevenage followed by a 1–0 home loss to Swindon Town, prompting him to criticise some of his players as "garbage". After being winless in his first five games in charge of Bury, they defeated Hartlepool United 2–1 to earn their first win of the season. The result sparked a run of form which saw Blackwell's side lose only once in eight games in all competitions, including five victories. In December the club was placed under a transfer embargo due to falling into financial difficulty. Numerous players were released and loaned out to keep the club solvent, with subsequent shortages in playing staff. Bury were officially relegated from League One on 13 April 2013 after losing 1–0 at home to Oldham Athletic

On 14 October 2013, Blackwell was dismissed as Bury manager, with the club 21st in League Two.

=== Reunion with Warnock ===
In August 2014 Blackwell was reunited with Neil Warnock at Crystal Palace. Working together for the first time in eleven years, Blackwell being appointed a Technical Director. Blackwell was asked to continue his role after Warnock had departed until the appointment of Alan Pardew. In February 2015 Blackwell started coaching at Barnet, helping Martin Allen with the Bees' title push in the Conference Premier until the end of the season.

In November 2015 Blackwell was brought in by Warnock, then interim manager at Queens Park Rangers, to assist him at the club. In February 2016, Blackwell was appointed assistant manager to Warnock at Rotherham United along with Ronnie Jepson. The management team left Rotherham in May of the same year, having guided the club to safety in the Championship. In October 2016, Blackwell again teamed up with Warnock and Jepson, as assistant manager at Cardiff City and also worked alongside the duo at Middlesbrough between June 2020 and November 2021.

=== Nakhon Ratchasima ===
In March 2022, Blackwell was appointed head coach of Thai club Nakhon Ratchasima.

=== Lechia Gdańsk ===
In October 2023, Blackwell joined Polish second division side Lechia Gdańsk as a technical director, and oversaw Lechia's I liga championship and promotion in his first season.

On 25 November 2024, following the suspension of manager Szymon Grabowski, Blackwell was named Lechia's caretaker head coach alongside Radosław Bella. In their only game in charge, Lechia lost 0–2 at GKS Katowice on 30 November.

=== Crawley Town ===
On 21 October 2026 Blackwell was appointed as interim manager of Crawley Town while the club searched for a successor to the recently sacked Colin Kazim-Richards. He was made manager until the end of the 2026–27 season on 19 November 2026.

== Managerial statistics ==
As of match played 21 November 2026

Managerial record by team and tenure
Team	From	To	Record					Ref.
Team	From	To	P	W	D	L	Win %	Ref.
Leeds United	1 June 2004	20 September 2006	114	44	37	33	38.6	
Luton Town	27 March 2007	16 January 2008	42	16	9	17	38.1	
Sheffield United	14 February 2008	14 August 2010	125	53	36	36	42.4	
Bury	26 September 2012	14 October 2013	57	13	18	26	22.8	
Nakhon Ratchasima	9 March 2022	5 February 2023	28	10	4	14	35.7	
Lechia Gdańsk (caretaker)	25 November 2024	30 November 2024	1	0	0	1	0.0	
Crawley Town	21 October 2026	Present	5	2	1	2	40.0	
Total			372	138	105	129	37.1	
