= Richard Ward (footballer) =

English footballer

Personal information
- Full name: Richard Ward
- Date of birth: 17 November 1973 (age 52)
- Place of birth: Scarborough, England
- Position: Midfielder

Senior career*
Years	Team	Apps	(Gls)
- Notts County
1994–1995	Huddersfield Town	0	(0)
- * Club domestic league appearances and goals

Richard Ward (born 17 November 1973) is an English former professional footballer, who played for Notts County and Huddersfield Town.
