= 2025–26 Scunthorpe United F.C. season =

Scunthorpe United F.C.
2025–26 season
- Chairman: Luke Leonard
- Manager: Andy Butler
- Stadium: Attis Arena
- National League: 5th
- Play-offs: Semi-finals
- FA Cup: First round
- FA Trophy: Fifth round
- National League Cup: Group stage
- Top goalscorer: League: Callum Roberts (17); All: Callum Roberts (21)
- Highest home attendance: 6,383 vs York City (24 February 2026, National League)
- Lowest home attendance: 369 vs Newcastle United U21 (2 December 2025, National League Cup)
- Average home league attendance: 4,684

The 2025–26 Scunthorpe United F.C. season was Scunthorpe United's 127th in existence, and the club's first season back in the National League after promotion from the National League North in the 2024–25 season. It was Andy Butler's second season in charge of Scunthorpe since his appointment as manager on 3 May 2024.

The club competed in the National League, the FA Cup, the FA Trophy, and the National League Cup.

On 3 May 2026, Scunthorpe were beaten by eventual play-off final winners Rochdale in the play-off semi-finals. Andy Butler's side had progressed from the qualifying round after a 1–0 win over Southend United, but fell to a 2–1 defeat at the Crown Oil Arena.

== Pre-season and friendlies ==
On 26 May 2025, the club announced that 14 players contracted for the previous season would remain at the club, with Sam Fishburn, Jason Law, and Fin Shrimpton all leaving the club. Two loan players, Mo Fadera and Oli Rose, also returned to their parent clubs after loan deals.

The club signed their first two players on 9 June 2025, 22 days after their promotion from the National League South, welcoming back former-academy products Joey Dawson from Celtic, and Declan Howe from Gainsborough Trinity. Both players joined on free transfers, with the club confirming several more signings before the end of the transfer window.

Scunthorpe United confirmed 8 pre-season friendlies against Bottesford Town, Appleby Frodingham, Cleethorpes Town, Alfreton Town, Gainsborough Trinity, Skegness Town, Spennymoor Town, and Worksop Town.

Win Draw Loss Fixtures

4 July 2025 Friendly	Bottesford Town	0–4	Scunthorpe United	Scunthorpe
19:00 BST		Report	Dawson 17'; Eze 24'; Uppal 45+2'; Ubaezuonu 70'	Stadium: Barrett Steel Stadium; Attendance: 1,100; Referee: David Jones

9 July 2025 Friendly	Appleby Frodingham	3–2	Scunthorpe United	Scunthorpe
19:00 BST	Kirk; Fraiwald	Report	Whitehall; Howe	Stadium: Brumby Hall Sports Ground; Attendance: 924; Referee: Ethan Nundy

12 July 2025 Friendly	Cleethorpes Town	2–4	Scunthorpe United	Grimsby
14:00 BST	Gratton 54'; Walker 54'	Report	Scales 51'; Beestin 82'; Whitehall 87'; Ewing 90+2'	Stadium: Linden Club; Referee: David Jones

15 July 2025 Friendly	Alfreton Town	1–2	Scunthorpe United	Alfreton
19:30 BST	Trialist 34'	Report	Roberts 24'; Chadwick 72'	Stadium: Impact Arena; Attendance: 246; Referee: Aaron Bannister

19 July 2025 Friendly	Gainsborough Trinity	1–0	Scunthorpe United	Gainsborough
13:00 BST	Shipstone 80' (og.)	Report		Stadium: KAL Group Stadium; Referee: Ethan Nundy

22 July 2025 Friendly	Skegness Town	0–3	Scunthorpe United	Skegness
19:00 BST		Report	Roberts 28' (pen.); Simmonds 43'; Howe 82'	Stadium: Vertigo Stadium; Attendance: 242

26 July 2025 Friendly	Spennymoor Town	1–4	Scunthorpe United	Spennymoor
15:00 BST	Madine 86'	Report	Roberts 6', 50', 65'; Howe 73'	Stadium: Brewery Field; Attendance: 551; Referee: James Bancroft

2 August 2025 Friendly	Worksop Town	1–1	Scunthorpe United	Worksop
15:00 BST	Hutchinson 62'	Report	Roberts 40'	Stadium: Sandy Lane; Referee: Gareth Thomas

== Competitions ==
Scunthorpe United competed in the National League in the 2025–26 season, as well as in three cup competitions, joining the FA Cup in the fourth qualifying round, the FA Trophy in the third round, and the National League Cup in the group stage.

=== National League ===
Pos	Team	Pld	W	D	L	GF	GA	GD	Pts	Promotion, qualification or relegation
3	Carlisle United	46	29	8	9	87	51	+36	95	Qualification for National League play-off semi-finals
4	Boreham Wood	46	27	9	10	95	58	+37	90	Qualification for the National League play-off quarter-finals
5	Scunthorpe United	46	23	13	10	77	62	+15	82	Qualification for the National League play-off quarter-finals
6	Southend United	46	23	12	11	83	47	+36	81	Qualification for the National League play-off quarter-finals
7	Forest Green Rovers	46	23	12	11	82	52	+30	81	Qualification for the National League play-off quarter-finals

Source: National League official site
Rules for classification: 1) Points; 2) Goal difference; 3) Number of goals scored; 4) Number of matches won; 5) Head-to-head results

==== Results summary ====
Overall								Home						Away					
Pld	W	D	L	GF	GA	GD	Pts	W	D	L	GF	GA	GD	W	D	L	GF	GA	GD
46	23	13	10	77	62	+15	82	12	6	5	37	28	+9	11	7	5	40	34	+6

Last updated: 19 May 2026.

==== Matches – Regular season ====
Scunthorpe United's fixtures were announced on 9 July 2025.

On 2 September 2025, Scunthorpe United's match against Eastleigh was abandoned in stoppage time after a collision between Eastleigh defender Archie Harris and Scunthorpe defender Jéan Belehouan. It was later announced by the National League that the game would be replayed in full at a later date.

Just four days later, Scunthorpe United's home fixture against Wealdstone was also abandoned after the Wealdstone players allegedly refused to resume play after an injury to forward Daniel Nkrumah. The National League announced that the three points would be awarded to Scunthorpe, but that the game would go down as a 0–0 draw.

9 August 2025 1	Tamworth	1–2	Scunthorpe United	Tamworth
15:00 BST	Hollis 36'	Report	Whitehall 4'; Ewing 43'	Stadium: The Lamb Ground; Attendance: 2,017; Referee: Elliott Swallow

16 August 2025 2	Scunthorpe United	3–1	Woking	Scunthorpe
15:00 BST	Howe 16', 24'; Whitehall 69'	Report	Turner 82'	Stadium: Attis Arena; Attendance: 4,412; Referee: James Bancroft

23 August 2025 3	Sutton United	2–3	Scunthorpe United	Sutton
15:00 BST	Taylor 34'; Njoku 47'; Vincent (red card) 72'	Report	Howe 13'; Rose 56'; Whitehall 62'	Stadium: VBS Community Stadium; Attendance: 2,332; Referee: Andrew Humphries

25 August 2025 4	Scunthorpe United	1–1	Halifax Town	Scunthorpe
15:00 BST	Horton (red card) 40'; Roberts 52'	Report	Kawa 55'	Stadium: Attis Arena; Attendance: 5,377; Referee: Andrew Miller

30 August 2025 5	Brackley Town	1–1	Scunthorpe United	Brackley
17:30 BST	Waldron 90+8'	Report	Whitehall 73' (pen.)	Stadium: St James Park; Attendance: 1,235; Referee: Callum Walchester

6 September 2025 6	Scunthorpe United	Abandoned	Wealdstone	Scunthorpe
15:00 BST		Report		Stadium: Attis Arena; Attendance: 4,460; Referee: Declan Bourne

13 September 2025 7	Forest Green Rovers	1–1	Scunthorpe United	Nailsworth
15:00 BST	Balagizi 90+8'	Report	Howe 2'	Stadium: The Bolt New Lawn; Attendance: 1,963; Referee: Ross Joyce

20 September 2025 8	Scunthorpe United	4–0	Truro City	Scunthorpe
15:00 BST	Dawson 23'; Howe 53'; Chadwick 70'; Whitehall 84'	Report		Stadium: Attis Arena; Attendance: 4,295; Referee: Neil Hair

24 September 2025 9	Scunthorpe United	1–1	Boreham Wood	Scunthorpe
19:45 BST	Roberts 74'	Report	Rush 1'	Stadium: Attis Arena; Attendance: 3,602; Referee: Gareth Rhodes

27 September 2025 10	Southend United	0–2	Scunthorpe United	Southend-on-Sea
15:00 BST		Report	Beestin 50'; Sellars-Fleming 55'	Stadium: Roots Hall; Attendance: 8,185; Referee: Elliott Swallow

1 October 2025 11	York City	1–3	Scunthorpe United	York
19:45 BST	Pearce 90+5'	Report	Beestin 45+3'; Ewing 83' (pen.); Sellars-Fleming 90+9'	Stadium: LNER Community Stadium; Attendance: 7,316; Referee: Seb Stockbridge

4 October 2025 12	Scunthorpe United	0–1	Carlisle United	Scunthorpe
17:30 BST	Boyce (red card) 40'	Report	Hayden 20'	Stadium: Attis Arena; Attendance: 5,472; Referee: Greg Rollason

7 October 2025 13	Scunthorpe United	3–1	Morecambe	Scunthorpe
19:45 BST	Roberts 39'; Whitehall 43'; Sellars-Fleming 77'	Report	Tollitt 70'	Stadium: Attis Arena; Attendance: 4,126; Referee: James Oldham

18 October 2025 14	Boston United	1–1	Scunthorpe United	Boston
15:00 BST	John-Lewis 55'	Report	Roberts 77' (pen.)	Stadium: Jakemans Community Stadium; Attendance: 2,866; Referee: Matthew Scholes

21 October 2025 15	Eastleigh	1–1	Scunthorpe United	Eastleigh
19:45 BST	McGuckin 76'	Report	Whitehall 51' (pen.)	Stadium: Silverlake Stadium; Attendance: 1,980; Referee: Alan Dale

25 October 2025 16	Scunthorpe United	2–1	Aldershot Town	Scunthorpe
15:00 BST	Roberts 18'; Westbrooke 32'	Report	Ghandour 12'	Stadium: Attis Arena; Attendance: 4,222; Referee: Dale Baines

8 November 2025 17	Scunthorpe United	1–0	Yeovil Town	Scunthorpe
15:00 BST	Sellars-Fleming 22'	Report		Stadium: Attis Arena; Attendance: 4,496; Referee: Richard Aspinall

15 November 2025 18	Solihull Moors	3–0	Scunthorpe United	Solihull
15:00 BST	Sinclair 15'; Stevenson 29' (yellow card) 35' (yellow-red card) 40'; French 71'	Report		Stadium: Damson Park; Attendance: 1,545; Referee: William Davis

22 November 2025 19	Scunthorpe United	1–1	Braintree Town	Scunthorpe
15:00 BST	Belehouan 15'	Report	Blackwell 87'	Stadium: Attis Arena; Attendance: 4,062; Referee: Kirsty Dowle

29 November 2025 20	Altrincham	4–2	Scunthorpe United	Altrincham
15:00 BST	Crawford 13'; Kosylo 88'; Crankshaw 90+1', 90+5'	Report	Ubaezuonu 13'; Beestin 59'	Stadium: J. Davidson Stadium; Attendance: 2,261; Referee: Steven Copeland

6 December 2025 21	Scunthorpe United	3–1	Tamworth	Scunthorpe
17:30 BST	Sellars-Fleming 31'; Ubaezuonu 75', 82'	Report	Starbuck 28' (o.g.)	Stadium: Attis Arena; Attendance: 3,935; Referee: James Westgate

20 December 2025 22	Woking	1–2	Scunthorpe United	Woking
12:30 BST	Osude 88'	Report	Whitehall 18'; Howe 74'	Stadium: Laithwaite Community Stadium; Attendance: 2,404; Referee: Aaron Bannister

26 December 2025 23	Hartlepool United	1–2	Scunthorpe United	Hartlepool
15:00 BST	Daly 78'	Report	Roberts 50' (pen.), 70'	Stadium: Victoria Park; Attendance: 4,434; Referee: Andrew Miller

30 December 2025 24	Scunthorpe United	2–0	Gateshead	Scunthorpe
19:45 BST	Roberts 36' (pen.); Whitehall 90+3'	Report	Melbourne (red card) 35'	Stadium: Attis Arena; Attendance: 5,012; Referee: Matthew Scholes

17 January 2026 25	Morecambe	2–2	Scunthorpe United	Morecambe
15:00 BST	Mahady 26' (o.g.); Muskwe 90+7' (pen.)	Report	Roberts 49'; Rowley 75'	Stadium: Mazuma Mobile Stadium; Attendance: 2,728; Referee: Harry Wager

20 January 2026 26	Boreham Wood	1–3	Scunthorpe United	Borehamwood
19:45 BST	Norris 84'	Report	O'Connell 27' (o.g.); Roberts 39'; Reynolds 45+4' (o.g.)	Stadium: Meadow Park; Attendance: 1,081; Referee: Robert Massey-Ellis

24 January 2026 27	Scunthorpe United	3–2	Forest Green Rovers	Scunthorpe
17:30 BST	Whitehall 38' (pen.); Westbrooke 50'; Ubaezuonu 75'	Report	Rees 5'; Buyabu 57'	Stadium: Attis Arena; Attendance: 5,215; Referee: Ross Joyce

7 February 2026 28	Scunthorpe United	1–0	Southend United	Scunthorpe
15:00 BST	Roberts 45+3'	Report		Stadium: Attis Arena; Attendance: 5,298; Referee: Ben Atkinson

10 February 2026 29	Carlisle United	3–2	Scunthorpe United	Carlisle
19:45 BST	Embleton 22'; Ajiboye 57', 84'	Report	Roberts 40'; Beestin 90+4'	Stadium: Brunton Park; Attendance: 5,226; Referee: Thomas Parsons

14 February 2026 30	Scunthorpe United	3–6	Boston United	Scunthorpe
15:00 BST	Roberts 29', 65' (pen.); Whitehall 45+6' (pen.)	Report	Cursons 7', 50', 90+8'; Carson 21'; Rooney 23', 45'	Stadium: Attis Arena; Attendance: 5,421; Referee: Richard Aspinall

17 February 2026 31	Rochdale	1–1	Scunthorpe United	Rochdale
19:45 BST	East 32'	Report	Roberts 17'	Stadium: Crown Oil Arena; Attendance: 3,615; Referee: Darren Drysdale

21 February 2026 32	Aldershot Town	3–1	Scunthorpe United	Aldershot
15:00 BST	Patton 8', 16'; Peart 33'	Report	Whitehall 49'	Stadium: EBB Stadium; Attendance: 2,568; Referee: George Laflin

24 February 2026 33	Scunthorpe United	0–3	York City	Scunthorpe
19:45 BST		Report	Stones 14', 71'; Grey 29'	Stadium: Attis Arena; Attendance: 6,383; Referee: Zac Kennard-Kettle

28 February 2026 34	Scunthorpe United	3–3	Solihull Moors	Scunthorpe
15:00 BST	Whitehall 48', 80', 85'	Report	Wilkinson 15', 42'; French (red card) 53'; Moore 90+5'	Stadium: Attis Arena; Attendance: 4,230; Referee: Abigail Byrne

7 March 2026 35	Yeovil Town	0–3	Scunthorpe United	Yeovil
15:00 BST		Report	Whitehall 50' (pen.); Farrell 74', 90+3'	Stadium: Huish Park; Attendance: 3,016; Referee: Callum Walchester

10 March 2026 36	Scunthorpe United	1–2	Sutton United	Scunthorpe
19:45 BST	Whitehall 52'	Report	Foyo 50'; Njoku 90+5'	Stadium: Attis Arena; Attendance: 3,611; Referee: Gareth Rhodes

14 March 2026 37	Scunthorpe United	2–1	Altrincham	Scunthorpe
17:30 BST	Starbuck 64'; Beestin 90+1'	Report	Weaver 40'	Stadium: Attis Arena; Attendance: 5,042; Referee: Simon Mather

17 March 2026 38	Truro City	1–2	Scunthorpe United	Truro
19:45 BST	Issaka 44'	Report	Farrell 14'; Beestin 20'	Stadium: Truro City Stadium; Attendance: 1,462; Referee: Adrian Quelch

21 March 2026 39	Braintree Town	2–3	Scunthorpe United	Braintree
15:00 BST	Akinde 1'; Walker 61'	Report	Farrell 38'; Ewing 58'; Roberts 90' (pen.)	Stadium: Rare Breed Meat Co. Stadium; Attendance: 1,021; Referee: Jason Richardson

25 March 2026 40	Scunthorpe United	2–2	Rochdale	Scunthorpe
19:45 BST	Roberts 60'; Beestin 87'	Report	Hannant 31'; Barlow 51'	Stadium: Attis Arena; Attendance: 4,898; Referee: Andrew Miller

28 March 2026 41	Halifax Town	1–2	Scunthorpe United	Halifax
15:00 BST	Harris 23'	Report	Jones 11'; Howe 82'	Stadium: The Shay; Attendance: 2,910; Referee: Declan Bourne

3 April 2026 42	Scunthorpe United	0–0	Hartlepool United	Scunthorpe
15:00 BST		Report		Stadium: Attis Arena; Attendance: 5,503; Referee: Aaron Bannister

6 April 2026 43	Gateshead	2–0	Scunthorpe United	Gateshead
15:00 BST	Nicholson 22'; Ward 50' (pen.)	Report	Barrows (red card) 50'	Stadium: Gateshead International Stadium; Attendance: 2,126; Referee: Declan Brown

11 April 2026 44	Scunthorpe United	1–0	Brackley Town	Scunthorpe
15:00 BST	Roberts 13'	Report		Stadium: Attis Arena; Attendance: 3,812; Referee: Isaac Searle

18 April 2026 45	Wealdstone	1–1	Scunthorpe United	Ruislip
15:00 BST	Wells-Morrison 71'	Report	Howe 89'	Stadium: Grosvenor Vale; Attendance: 1,636; Referee: Alex Chilowicz

25 April 2026 46	Scunthorpe United	0–1	Eastleigh	Scunthorpe
12:30 BST		Report	Saunders 18'	Stadium: Attis Arena; Attendance: 4,846; Referee: Oliver Mackey

==== Play-offs ====
Scunthorpe United entered the play-offs after finishing 5th in the National League. This meant they would face the team who finished in 6th, which was Southend United. After defeating Southend 1–0 thanks to a Callum Roberts goal, Scunthorpe traveled to face Rochdale at the Crown Oil Arena.

28 April 2026 Promotion Play-offs Qualifying Round	Scunthorpe United	1–0	Southend United	Scunthorpe
19:45 BST	Roberts 5'	Report	Taylor (yellow card) 36' (yellow-red card) 90+8'	Stadium: Attis Arena; Attendance: 6,248; Referee: James Oldham

3 May 2026 Promotion Play-offs Semi Final	Rochdale	2–1	Scunthorpe United	Rochdale
15:00 BST	Evans 3' (o.g.); Rodney 57'	Report	Howe 81'	Stadium: Crown Oil Arena; Attendance: 7,552; Referee: Jamie O'Connor

=== FA Cup ===
On 29 September 2025, Scunthorpe were drawn at home to King's Lynn Town in the FA Cup fourth round qualifying.

11 October 2025 Fourth qualifying round	Scunthorpe United	4–2	King's Lynn Town	Scunthorpe
15:00 BST	Sellars-Fleming 62'; Roberts 77', 90+3'; Ubaezuonu 87'	Report	Clements 8'; Crane 26'	Stadium: Attis Arena; Attendance: 2,261; Referee: Gareth Thomas

1 November 2025 First round	Blackpool	1–0	Scunthorpe United	Blackpool
15:00 BST	Fletcher 17'	Report		Stadium: Bloomfield Road; Attendance: 4,503; Referee: Elliot Bell

=== FA Trophy ===
On 17 November 2025, Scunthorpe were drawn at home against National League North side Peterborough Sports, with the game set to take place on 13 December 2025.

13 December 2025 Third round	Scunthorpe United	5–0	Peterborough Sports	Scunthorpe
15:00 BST	Howe 28'; Roberts 57'; Eze 65', 78'; Brogan 90+2'	Report		Stadium: Attis Arena; Attendance: 1,167; Referee: Gareth Thomas

13 December 2025 Fourth round	Scunthorpe United	3–1	Clitheroe	Scunthorpe
19:45 BST	Whitehall 57'; Ubaezuonu 80'; Belehouan 89'	Report	Morris 64'	Stadium: Attis Arena; Attendance: 1,364; Referee: Zac Kennard-Kettle

31 January 2026 Fifth round	Scunthorpe United	1–2	Horsham	Scunthorpe
15:00 BST	Howe 11'	Report	Myles-Meekums 20'; Elliott 33'	Stadium: Attis Arena; Attendance: 1,890; Referee: James Oldham

=== National League Cup ===
On 14 July 2025, Scunthorpe were drawn into Group D of the 2025–26 National League Cup, alongside Boston United, FC Halifax Town, Gateshead, Newcastle United U21, Leeds United U21, Sunderland U21, and Middlesbrough U21. Due to the format of the competition, Scunthorpe would play four home games in the group stage, against the under 21 sides in the group, which was the case for Boston, Halifax, and Gateshead.

12 August 2025 1	Scunthorpe United	2–3	Sunderland U21	Scunthorpe
19:00 BST	Ubaezuonu 6'; Dawson 30'	Report	Poveda 45+1'; Samuel-Ogunsuyi 70'; Whittaker 90+2'	Stadium: Attis Arena; Attendance: 979; Referee: Gareth Thomas

16 September 2025 2	Scunthorpe United	1–3	Leeds United U21	Scunthorpe
19:00 BST	Ubaezuonu 47'	Report	Gray 33', 73', 88'	Stadium: Attis Arena; Attendance: 1,016; Referee: Jamie O'Connor

28 October 2025 3	Scunthorpe United	3–2	Middlesbrough U21	Scunthorpe
19:00 BST	Howe 38'; Sellars-Fleming 65'; Beck 88'	Report	Finch 77'; Smith 82'	Stadium: Attis Arena; Attendance: 426; Referee: Andrew Miller

2 December 2025 4	Scunthorpe United	2–0	Newcastle United U21	Scunthorpe
19:00 BST	Oteh 33'; Howe 80'	Report		Stadium: Attis Arena; Attendance: 369; Referee: James Bancroft

== Squad statistics ==
No.	Pos.	Nat.	Name	League		Play-offs		FA Cup		FA Trophy		National League Cup		Total		Discipline	
No.	Pos.	Nat.	Name	Apps	Goals	Apps	Goals	Apps	Goals	Apps	Goals	Apps	Goals	Apps	Goals	Yellow card	Red card
1	GK	ENG	Maison Campbell	5	0	0	0	0	0	0	0	1	0	6	0	0	0
2	DF	ENG	Oliver Rose	1+4	1	0	0	0	0	0	0	1	0	2+4	1	1	0
3	DF	ENG	Branden Horton	33+3	0	2	0	2	0	3	0	4	0	44+3	0	8	1
4	DF	CIV	Jéan Belehouan	12+11	1	2	0	1	0	1+1	1	2	0	18+12	2	3	0
5	DF	ENG	Will Evans	25+3	0	2	0	1	0	1	0	0+1	0	29+4	0	7	0
6	DF	ENG	Andrew Boyce	32+1	0	0+1	0	1	0	3	0	2	0	38+2	0	7	1
7	FW	WAL	Declan Howe	15+16	9	0+2	1	1+1	0	3	2	2	2	21+19	14	2	0
8	MF	ENG	Alfie Beestin	23+17	7	0+2	0	1+1	0	2	0	1	0	27+20	7	8	0
9	FW	ENG	Danny Whitehall	34+5	16	2	0	1	0	0+2	1	0	0	37+7	17	7	0
10	MF	ENG	Callum Roberts	36+3	17	2	1	2	2	3	1	1	0	44+3	21	4	0
11	MF	ENG	Joe Rowley	43	1	2	0	2	0	2	0	1+1	0	50+1	1	12	0
12	GK	ENG	Louis Jones	13	0	2	0	0	0	2	0	1	0	18	0	0	0
14	FW	WAL	Pat Jones	7+3	1	2	0	0	0	0	0	0	0	9+3	1	2	0
15	DF	ENG	Zain Tahir	4	0	0	0	0	0	0	0	0	0	4	0	0	0
17	MF	WAL	Oli Ewing	37+3	3	2	0	1+1	0	1+2	0	1	0	42+6	3	1	0
18	MF	ENG	Max Brogan	0+1	0	0	0	0	0	0+1	1	2+1	0	2+2	1	0	0
20	MF	ENG	Kian Scales	5+16	0	0+2	0	1+1	0	1	0	4	0	11+19	0	6	0
21	DF	ENG	Joe Starbuck	28+7	1	0	0	1+1	0	2+1	0	2+1	0	33+10	1	2	1
22	FW	ENG	Joey Dawson	4+8	1	0	0	1	0	0+1	0	3+1	1	8+10	2	2	0
23	FW	ENG	Kyle Hurst	4+1	0	0	0	0	0	0	0	0	0	4+1	0	0	0
24	MF	ENG	Harry Shipstone	0+1	0	0	0	0	0	0+2	0	0+2	0	0+5	0	0	0
25	MF	ENG	Zain Westbrooke	31+3	2	2	0	1+1	0	2+1	0	0+2	0	36+7	2	6	0
27	DF	ENG	Jonathan Gjoshe	0	0	0	0	0	0	0	0	0+2	0	0+2	0	1	0
30	GK	ENG	Kian Johnson	0	0	0	0	0	0	0	0	1	0	1	0	0	0
32	MF	SCO	Connor Smith	5+9	0	0	0	0	0	1	0	0	0	6+9	0	1	0
33	DF	ENG	Tyler Denton	37+3	0	2	0	1	0	0+1	0	3	0	43+4	0	8	0
38	GK	SCO	Rory Mahady	18	0	0	0	1	0	1	0	0	0	20	0	3	0
44	DF	ENG	Ross Barrows	10+9	0	0+2	0	0	0	2+1	0	1	0	13+12	0	1	1
Player(s) who featured but departed the club during the season:
14	FW	ZAF	Carlton Ubaezuonu	5+24	4	0	0	0+2	1	3	1	3+1	2	11+27	8	3	0
15	MF	ENG	Dubem Eze	0+3	0	0	0	0+1	0	0+1	2	1+3	0	1+8	2	0	0
16	FW	USA	Aidan Dausch	2+14	0	0	0	0	0	0	0	0	0	2+14	0	1	0
16	FW	ENG	Tyrell Sellars-Fleming	9+5	5	0	0	2	1	0	0	0+2	1	11+7	7	3	0
19	FW	SCO	Mark Beck	1+5	0	0	0	0	0	0	0	2+1	1	3+6	1	0	0
23	FW	ENG	Billy Chadwick	3+5	1	0	0	0	0	0	0	3+1	0	6+6	1	0	0
28	FW	ENG	Aramide Oteh	0	0	0	0	0	0	0	0	1	1	1	1	0	0
30	FW	ENG	Leo Farrell	4+3	4	0	0	0	0	0	0	0	0	4+3	4	0	0
31	GK	ENG	Rory Watson	9	0	0	0	1	0	0	0	1	0	11	0	0	0

== Transfers ==
=== In ===
Date	Pos.	Name	From	Fee	Ref.
1 July 2025	DF	(Ivory Coast) Jéan Belehouan	(England) Gateshead	Free	
1 July 2025	FW	(England) Joey Dawson	(Scotland) Celtic	Free	
1 July 2025	MF	(Wales) Oli Ewing	(England) Leicester City	Free	
1 July 2025	DF	(England) Branden Horton	(England) Gateshead	Free	
1 July 2025	FW	(Wales) Declan Howe	(England) Gainsborough Trinity	Free	
1 August 2025	DF	(England) Oliver Rose	(England) Peterborough United	Undisclosed	
6 September 2025	DF	(England) Jonathan Gjoshe	(England) Corinthian-Casuals	Free	
13 September 2025	GK	(England) Kian Johnson	(England) Gainsborough Trinity	Free	
2 December 2025	FW	(England) Aramide Oteh	Unnattached	Free	
15 January 2026	MF	(Scotland) Connor Smith	(Scotland) Hamilton Academical	Undisclosed	
10 March 2026	FW	(Wales) Pat Jones	(England) Chester	Undisclosed	

=== Out ===
Date	Pos.	Name	To	Fee	Ref.
26 December 2025	FW	(England) Aramide Oteh	(England) Braintree Town	Free	
10 March 2026	FW	(England) Carlton Ubaezuonu	(England) King's Lynn Town	Undisclosed	

=== Loaned out ===
Date from	Date to	Pos.	Name	To	Ref.
1 October 2025	3 November 2025	DF	(England) Jonathan Gjoshe	(England) Bottesford Town	
8 November 2025	2 January 2026	FW	(Scotland) Mark Beck	(England) Alfreton Town	
8 November 2025	7 December 2025	MF	(England) Max Brogan	(England) Cleethorpes Town	
3 January 2026	31 May 2026	FW	(Scotland) Mark Beck	(England) Gateshead	
6 January 2026	3 March 2026	MF	(England) Kian Scales	(England) Radcliffe	
14 January 2026	26 April 2026	MF	(England) Max Brogan	(England) Leamington	
22 January 2026	31 May 2026	GK	(England) Kian Johnson	(England) Grimsby Borough	
6 February 2026	31 May 2026	GK	(England) Maison Campbell	(England) Bradford Park Avenue	
6 February 2026	26 March 2026	FW	(Wales) Declan Howe	(England) Altrincham	
20 February 2026	22 March 2026	FW	(England) Joey Dawson	(England) Buxton	

=== Loaned in ===
Date from	Date to	Pos.	Name	From	Ref.
1 July 2025	1 January 2026	MF	(England) Dubem Eze	(England) Bolton Wanderers	
14 July 2025	1 January 2026	FW	(England) Billy Chadwick	(England) York City	
19 July 2025	31 October 2025	GK	(England) Rory Watson	(England) York City	
16 September 2025	8 January 2026	FW	(England) Tyrell Sellars-Fleming	(England) Hull City	
1 October 2025	31 May 2026	GK	(Scotland) Rory Mahady	(England) Leeds United	
1 October 2025	31 May 2026	MF	(England) Zain Westbrooke	(England) Doncaster Rovers	
8 January 2026	31 May 2026	FW	(England) Kyle Hurst	(England) Doncaster Rovers	
7 February 2026	31 May 2026	FW	(United States) Aidan Dausch	(England) Coventry City	
28 February 2026	28 March 2026	FW	(England) Leo Farrell	(England) Barnsley	
28 February 2026	31 May 2026	DF	(England) Zain Tahir	(England) Sheffield United	

=== Released / Out of contract ===
Date	Pos.	Name	Subsequent club	Join date	Ref.
1 July 2025	MF	(England) Michael Clunan	(England) King's Lynn Town	1 July 2025	
1 July 2025	FW	(England) Sam Fishburn	(England) Blyth Town	1 July 2025	
1 July 2025	GK	(England) Ross Fitzsimons	(England) Northampton Town	1 July 2025	
1 July 2025	DF	(Scotland) Michael Kelly	(England) Boston United	1 July 2025	
1 July 2025	DF	(Cameroon) Maxim Kouogun	(England) Hartlepool United	11 July 2025	
1 July 2025	MF	(England) Jason Law	(England) Stamford	9 August 2025	
1 July 2025	MF	(England) Finley Shrimpton	(England) Chester	1 July 2025	
