= Rob Apter =

Scottish footballer (born 2003)

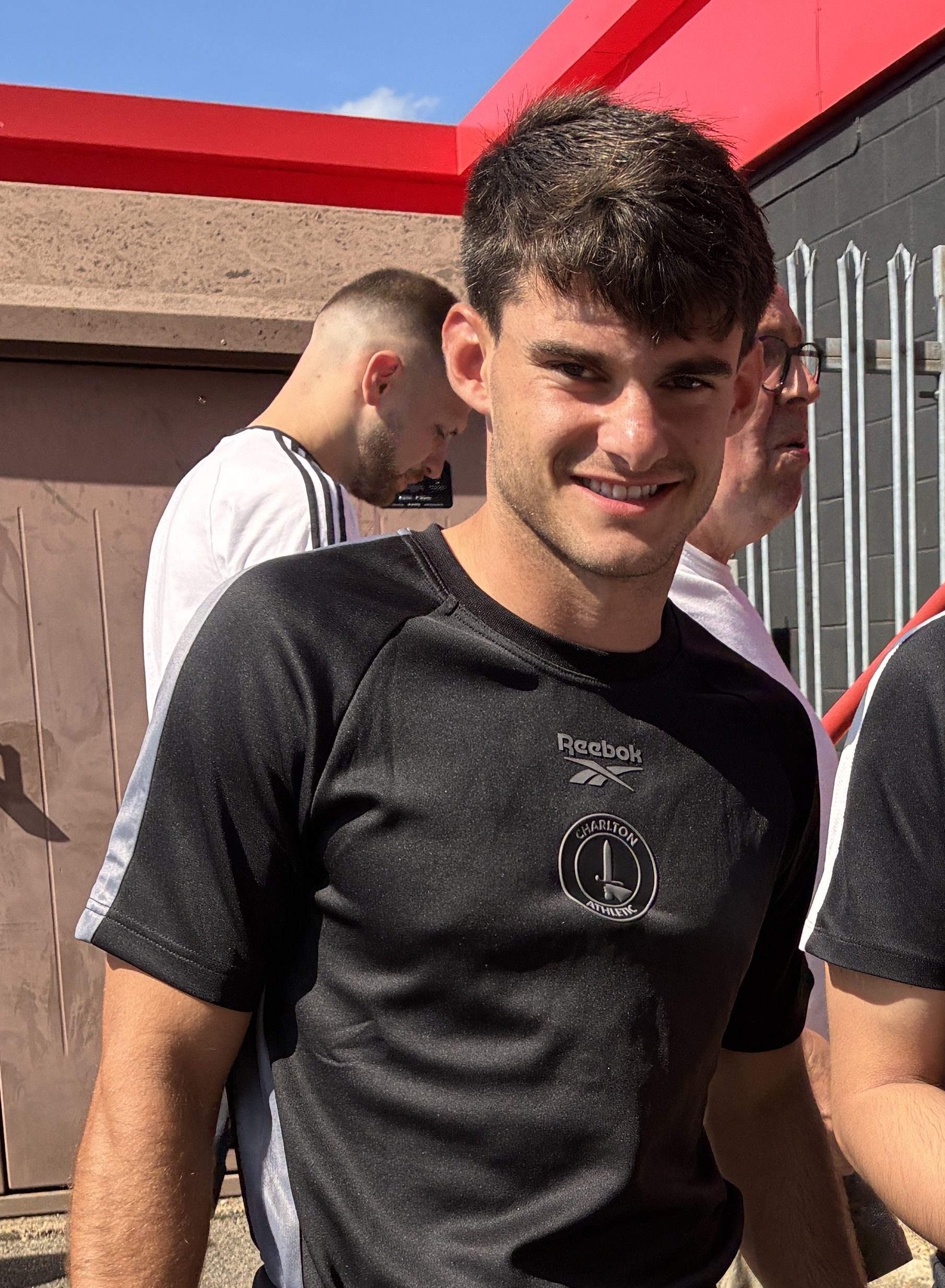
- Apter in 2025

Personal information
- Full name: Robert Julian Apter
- Date of birth: 23 April 2003 (age 23)
- Place of birth: Liverpool, England
- Height: 1.75 m (5 ft 9 in)
- Position: Right midfielder

Team information
- Current team: Charlton Athletic
- Number: 30

Youth career
- 2012–: Tranmere Rovers
- Motherwell
- 2019–2020: Blackpool

Senior career*
Years	Team	Apps	(Gls)
2020–2025	Blackpool	47	(8)
2021	→ Bamber Bridge (loan)	18	(9)
2022	→ Chester (loan)	17	(2)
2022–2023	→ Scunthorpe United (loan)	19	(4)
2023–2024	→ Tranmere Rovers (loan)	37	(12)
2025–	Charlton Athletic	14	(1)
2026	→ Bolton Wanderers (loan)	13	(0)

International career^{‡}
2021–2022	Scotland U19	6	(1)
2024	Scotland U21	4	(0)
- * Club domestic league appearances and goals as of 17:10, 5 September 2026 (UTC) ‡ National team caps and goals as of 15:10, 11 September 2025 (UTC)

Robert Julian Apter (born 23 April 2003) is a professional footballer who plays as a right midfielder for EFL Championship club Charlton Athletic.

He began his career in 2012, in the youth team at Tranmere Rovers. After a brief spell at Motherwell, he joined Blackpool's youth ranks in 2019. In 2020, he made his professional debut for Blackpool, where he remained for five years. After several loan spells, including back at Tranmere, during which time he was named the 2023–24 EFL League Two Young Player of the Season. He joined Charlton Athletic in 2025.

Born in England to a Scottish father, he has ten Scotland caps combined at under-19 and under-21 level.

== Club career ==
=== Blackpool ===
Liverpool-born Apter was at Tranmere Rovers academy, leaving aged 15 after seven years. He was then at the Motherwell academy.

Aged 16, Apter secured a two-year scholarship at Blackpool in May 2019. In November 2020 he signed a two-year professional contract, with the option of an additional year. He made his senior debut later that month as a substitute in an EFL Trophy win versus Leeds United U21. He made his league debut, again as a substitute, in a 5–0 win at Wigan Athletic on 26 January 2021. In February 2021, he was one of 33 players awarded with the League Football Education's "The 11" award for under-18 players.

Apter signed a new two-and-a-half-year contract with Blackpool on 3 December 2021, with an option of a further year. In December 2021, Apter joined Scottish Premiership side Livingston on a week-long trial with a view to signing on loan; no transfer materialised following the trial, however.

On 12 January 2024, Apter signed a new three-and-a-half-year contract with Blackpool, before returning to Tranmere for a second loan until the end of the season. At the end of the season, he was named EFL League Two Young Player of the Season.

Apter scored his first goal for Blackpool on 28 September 2024, in a 3–0 victory over Burton Albion at Bloomfield Road.

On 18 April 2025, Apter scored the first hat-trick of his career in Blackpool's 3–1 League One victory at Stevenage.

==== Bamber Bridge (loan) ====
On 13 August 2021, Apter joined Bamber Bridge on loan. As of 2 December, he had scored ten goals in all competitions, including one goal from the halfway line in November in a 4–1 win away at Witton Albion. He returned to his parent club on 15 December.

==== Chester (loan) ====
On 3 January 2022, Apter joined Chester on an initial 28-day loan. On 1 February 2022, the loan was extended until the end of the season.

==== Scunthorpe United (loan) ====
On 28 August 2022, Apter joined National League club Scunthorpe United on loan until January 2023. He made his debut the following day in a 2–0 home defeat to FC Halifax Town.

==== Tranmere Rovers (loan) ====
On 1 September 2023, Apter joined Tranmere Rovers on loan until January 2024. He was nominated for League Two Player of the Month for November. The award was subsequently given to Jake Young.

=== Charlton Athletic ===
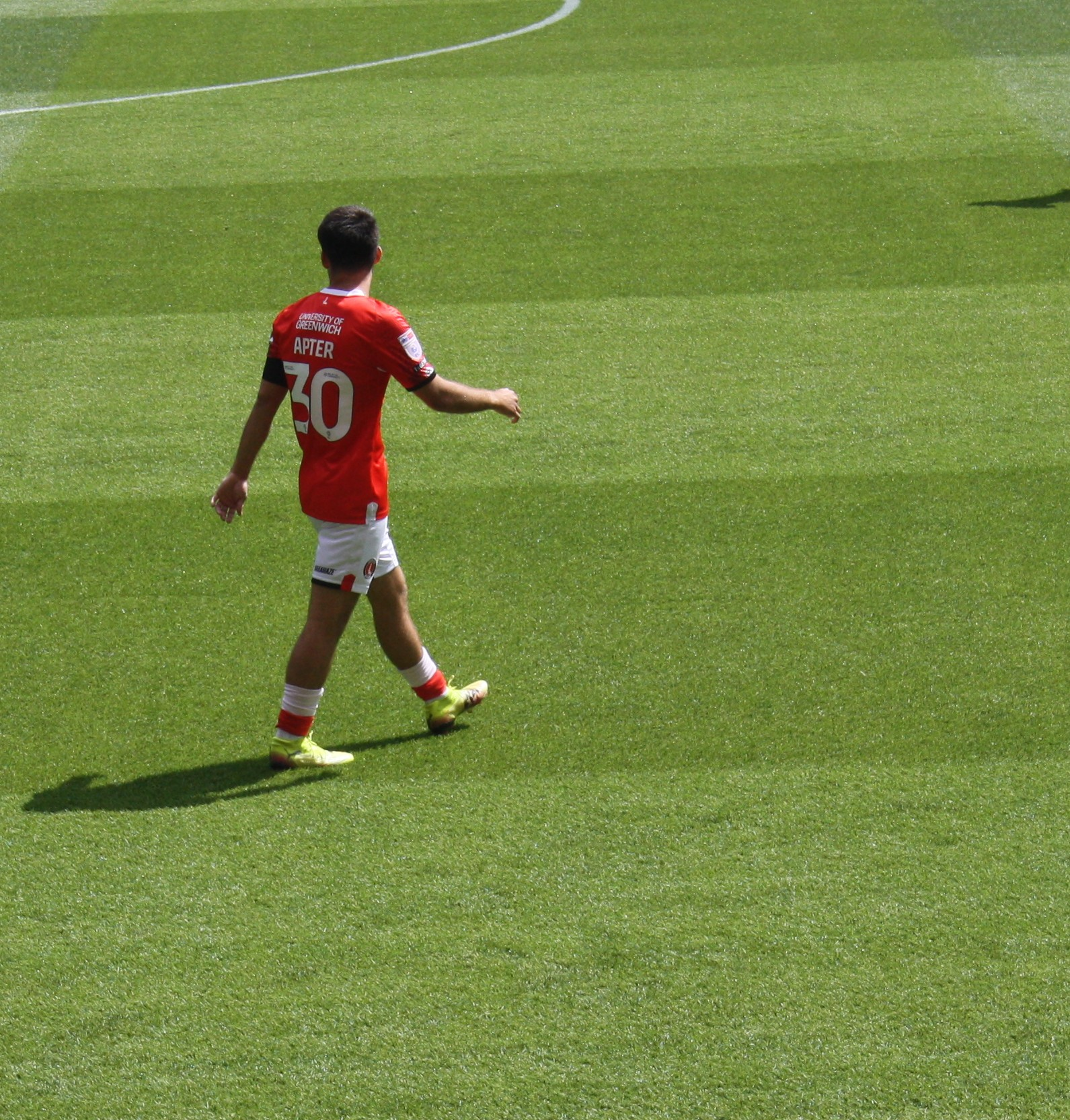
Apter making his Charlton Athletic debut against Watford.

Aged 22, on 17 July 2025, Apter transferred for a fee worth over £2 million to Charlton Athletic on a four-year deal. His competitive Charlton debut was in the league season opener, a single-goal victory over Watford on 9 August 2025. His first Charlton goal was in the 3–1 defeat at Queen's Park Rangers on 30 August 2025.

He ended his first month of playing Charlton first team football by being named Charlton Player of the Month for August 2025. He collected 39% of votes to win that award.

==== Bolton Wanderers (loan) ====
On 28 January 2026, Apter joined Bolton Wanderers on loan for the remainder of the season.

== International career ==
Apter is eligible for Scotland via his father. In September 2021, Apter was called up to the Scotland under-19s. He made his debut for the under-19s on 10 November 2021 against Armenia. He scored his first goal for them three days later in a 3–0 victory over Gibraltar. He collected six under-19 and four under-21 Scottish caps.

== Style of play ==
Apter has been reported as modelling his game on Jack Grealish and Philippe Coutinho. On signing for Charlton, manager Nathan Jones remarked, "Rob's exactly the type of player that we want to sign for Charlton Athletic - he's young, athletic, has a high ceiling and is a really technical player. He's an exciting player that can score and assist." His goalscoring technique has been described as liking to cut in to curl the ball into the opposite corner of the goal.

== Personal life ==
Apter's younger brother, Matthew, is also a footballer who plays for Cardiff City.

== Career statistics ==
As of match played 5 September 2026

Appearances and goals by club, season and competition
Club	Season	League			FA Cup		EFL Cup		Other		Total	
Club	Season	Division	Apps	Goals	Apps	Goals	Apps	Goals	Apps	Goals	Apps	Goals
Blackpool	2020–21	League One	1	0	0	0	0	0	1 (Note: Appearance(s) in EFL Trophy)	0	2	0
Blackpool	2021–22	Championship	0	0	—		0	0	—		0	0
Blackpool	2022–23	Championship	1	0	0	0	0	0	—		1	0
Blackpool	2023–24	League One	0	0	—		2	0	—		2	0
Blackpool	2024–25	League One	45	8	1	0	3	0	1	0	50	8
Blackpool	Blackpool total		47	8	1	0	5	0	2	0	55	8
Bamber Bridge (loan)	2021–22	NPL Premier Division	18	9	2	1	—		1 (Note: Appearance(s) in FA Trophy)	0	21	10
Chester (loan)	2021–22	National League North	17	2	—		—		—		17	2
Scunthorpe United (loan)	2022–23	National League	19	4	—		—		1	0	20	4
Tranmere Rovers (loan)	2023–24	League Two	37	12	1	1	—		2	0	40	13
Charlton Athletic	2025–26	Championship	13	1	0	0	0	0	—		13	1
Charlton Athletic	2026–27	Championship	1	0	0	0	1	0	—		2	0
Charlton Athletic	Charlton Athletic total		14	1	0	0	1	0	0	0	15	1
Bolton Wanderers (loan)	2025–26	League One	13	0	—		—		0	0	13	0
Career total			165	36	4	2	6	0	6	0	181	38

== Honours ==
Individual

- EFL League Two Young Player of the Season: 2023–24
- Charlton Athletic Player of the Month; August 2025
