= Charlie Jolley (footballer, born 2001) =

English footballer

Personal information
- Full name: Charlie Patrick Jolley
- Date of birth: 13 January 2001 (age 25)
- Place of birth: Liverpool, England
- Position: Forward

Team information
- Current team: Marine

Youth career
- Wigan Athletic

Senior career*
Years	Team	Apps	(Gls)
2019–2021	Wigan Athletic	3	(0)
2019	→ Curzon Ashton (loan)	7	(1)
2021–2024	Tranmere Rovers	38	(8)
2021	→ Chester (loan)	6	(1)
2024–2026	AFC Fylde	65	(9)
2025–2026	→ Marine (loan)	23	(9)
2026–	Marine	0	(0)
- * Club domestic league appearances and goals as of 17:00, 25 June 2026 (UTC)

Charlie Patrick Jolley (born 13 January 2001) is an English footballer who plays as a forward for National League North club Marine.

== Club career ==
Jolley made his debut for Wigan Athletic in May 2019. In November 2019 he joined Curzon Ashton on loan. He scored his first goals for Wigan when he scored twice in a 6-1 EFL Trophy win over Liverpool U21s on 22 September 2020.

=== Tranmere Rovers ===
He joined Tranmere Rovers on an 18-month contract for an undisclosed fee in January 2021.

On 29 October 2021, Jolley joined National League North side Chester on a one-month loan deal. He scored on his home debut for the club in a 4–0 victory over Boston United. On 1 December 2021, the loan spell was extended for a further month.

However, on 7 December 2021, Jolley was recalled from his loan spell by parent club Tranmere Rovers who had suffered several injuries to key players. Later that same day, Jolley went on to score a 90th-minute winner for Rovers in a league match against Oldham Athletic at Boundary Park.

He was released by Tranmere following the conclusion of the 2023–24 season.

=== AFC Fylde ===
On 5 July 2024, Jolley joined National League side AFC Fylde on a two-year contract.

In November 2025, Jolley joined fellow National League North side Marine on loan for the remainder of the 2025–26 season.

Following AFC Fylde's promotion back to the National League, Jolley was released at the end of the 2025–26 season.

=== Marine ===
On 19 June 2026, Jolley returned to National League North club Marine on a permanent deal following a successful loan spell the previous season.

== Career statistics ==
As of end of 2023–24 season

Appearances and goals by club, season and competition
Club	Season	League			FA Cup		League Cup		Other		Total	
Club	Season	Division	Apps	Goals	Apps	Goals	Apps	Goals	Apps	Goals	Apps	Goals
Wigan Athletic	2018–19	Championship	1	0	0	0	0	0	0	0	1	0
Wigan Athletic	2019–20	Championship	0	0	0	0	1	0	0	0	1	0
Wigan Athletic	2020–21	League One	2	0	0	0	0	0	2 (Note: Appearance(s) in EFL Trophy)	2	4	2
Wigan Athletic	Total		3	0	0	0	1	0	2	2	6	2
Curzon Ashton (loan)	2019–20	National League North	7	1	0	0	—		2 (Note: Appearance(s) in FA Trophy)	1	9	2
Tranmere Rovers	2020–21	League Two	2	0	0	0	0	0	0	0	2	0
Tranmere Rovers	2021–22	League Two	12	4	0	0	0	0	1	0	13	4
Tranmere Rovers	2022–23	League Two	0	0	0	0	0	0	0	0	0	0
Tranmere Rovers	2023–24	League Two	24	4	1	0	1	0	3	0	29	4
Tranmere Rovers	Total		38	8	1	0	1	0	4	0	44	8
Chester (loan)	2021–22	National League North	6	1	0	0	—		1	1	7	2
Career total			54	10	1	0	2	0	9	4	66	14
