= Joey Dawson =

English footballer

Personal information
- Date of birth: 30 May 2003 (age 23)
- Place of birth: Scunthorpe, England
- Positions: Midfielder; forward

Team information
- Current team: Missouri State University
- Number: 22

Youth career
- 2011–2019: Scunthorpe United

Senior career*
Years	Team	Apps	(Gls)
2019–2021	Scunthorpe United	0	(0)
2021–2025	Celtic	1	(0)
2022–2025	Celtic B	21	(20)
2025–2026	Scunthorpe United	5	(1)
2026	Missouri State University Bears	8	(2)
- * Club domestic league appearances and goals as of 18:27, 5 October 2025 (UTC)

Joey Dawson (born 30 May 2003) is an English professional footballer who played most recently for National League side Scunthorpe United. He can play as a midfielder or forward.

== Club career ==
=== Scunthorpe United ===
Dawson joined the Scunthorpe United Academy at under-8 level and began a two-year scholarship in May 2019. He made his first-team debut on 13 August 2019, aged just 16 years and 75 days old, to become the youngest player in the club's history. The game was a 1–0 defeat to Derby County in the first round of the EFL Cup at Glanford Park, he came on as a 74th-minute substitute for John McAtee. Two months later he was reportedly being tracked by Arsenal.

Dawson made no more competitive first-team appearances for Scunthorpe, but did continue to play regularly in their under-18 team. His goal in a 3–2 win over Mansfield Town was one of 10 nominees for October 2020 goal of the month. By April 2021, he had scored 16 goals for the youth team during the season, and Derby County and Celtic were now being reported as interested in signing him.

=== Celtic ===
Dawson signed a three-year contract with Celtic in June 2021. He made his debut on Boxing Day 2021 against St Johnstone.

=== Return to Scunthorpe United ===
On 9 June 2025, Dawson returned to Scunthorpe United following their promotion back to the National League. On 8 May 2026, the club announced the player would be leaving in the summer when his contract expired.

=== Missouri State University Bears ===
Dawson made his collegiate debut for Missouri State on October 10th, 2026 in 1-1 draw vs. Memphis. Recorded his first collegiate goal on October 22nd, 2026 in a 2-0 win over Bradley. Added another tally to the scoresheet in a 2-0 win over UAB on October 28th. His younger brother Lucas is also a member of the team.

== Style of play ==
Dawson is a versatile player who can play as a midfielder or forward.

== Personal life ==
Dawson was born in Scunthorpe. His father, Andy Dawson, is a former player, caretaker-manager and first-team coach at Scunthorpe United. His uncle, Michael Dawson, is a former Premier League player and England international. Another uncle, Kevin Dawson, played for Nottingham Forest and Chesterfield.

== Career statistics ==
As of 3 March 2022

Appearances and goals by club, season and competition
Club	Season	League			National cup		League cup		Other		Total	
Club	Season	Division	Apps	Goals	Apps	Goals	Apps	Goals	Apps	Goals	Apps	Goals
Scunthorpe United	2019–20	EFL League Two	0	0	0	0	1	0	0	0	1	0
Scunthorpe United	2020–21	EFL League Two	0	0	0	0	0	0	0	0	0	0
Scunthorpe United	Total		0	0	0	0	1	0	0	0	1	0
Celtic	2021–22	Scottish Premiership	1	0	0	0	1	0	0	0	1	0
Career total			1	0	0	0	1	0	0	0	2	0

== Honours ==
Celtic

- Scottish Premiership: 2021–22
