= Josef Yarney =

English footballer (born 1997)

Personal information
- Full name: Josef Charles Yarney
- Date of birth: 8 October 1997 (age 29)
- Place of birth: Liverpool, England
- Height: 6 ft 0 in (1.83 m)
- Position: Centre-back

Team information
- Current team: Macclesfield

Youth career
- –2017: Everton
- 2017–2018: Newcastle United

Senior career*
Years	Team	Apps	(Gls)
2018–2019	Newcastle United	0	(0)
2018	→ Morecambe (loan)	21	(0)
2019	→ Chesterfield (loan)	15	(0)
2019–2021	Chesterfield	45	(2)
2021	Weymouth	1	(0)
2021–2022	RoundGlass Punjab	15	(0)
2023	Oldham Athletic	22	(2)
2023–2024	Tranmere Rovers	24	(0)
2024	Hilal Al-Quds Club		
2025	Boreham Wood	8	(0)
2025–	Macclesfield	0	(0)
- * Club domestic league appearances and goals as of 18:03, 7 July 2025 (UTC)

Josef Charles Yarney (born 8 October 1997) is an English professional footballer who plays as a central defender for Macclesfield.

== Career ==
Born in Liverpool, Yarney began his career at Everton, before moving to Newcastle United in July 2017. He signed on loan for Morecambe on 11 August 2018, making his senior debut later that same day. In January 2019 he moved on loan to Chesterfield.

After being released by Newcastle at the end of the 2018–19 season, in June 2019 it was announced that he would sign permanently for Chesterfield after the expiry of his contract on 30 June 2019.

He signed for Weymouth in October 2021. In November 2021, he moved to Indian I-League club RoundGlass Punjab.

On 7 January 2023, Yarney signed for National League side Oldham Athletic on a non-contract basis following a successful trial. In February 2023, he signed an 18-month pre-contract agreement with the club. However, having previously played in India, international clearance regulations meant the contract could not be ratified until the summer, by which point Yarney no longer agreed to the deal. At the end of the 2022–23 season he was voted the Supporters' Player of the Year.

In July 2023 he signed a one-year contract with Tranmere Rovers as a free agent. He was released at the end of the 2023–24 season.

In October 2024, Yarney signed for West Bank Premier League side Hilal Al-Quds.

On 6 February 2025, Yarney returned to England, joining National League South side Boreham Wood.

On 7 July 2025, it was announced that Yarney had been signed by National League North side Macclesfield.

== Career statistics ==
As of match played 29 March 2024

Appearances and goals by club, season and competition
Club	Season	League			FA Cup		EFL Cup		Other		Total	
Club	Season	Division	Apps	Goals	Apps	Goals	Apps	Goals	Apps	Goals	Apps	Goals
Everton	2016–17	Premier League	0	0	0	0	0	0	3 (Note: Appearance(s) in EFL Trophy)	0	3	0
Newcastle United	2017–18	Premier League	0	0	0	0	0	0	1	0	1	0
Newcastle United	2018–19	Premier League	0	0	0	0	0	0	0	0	0	0
Newcastle United	Total		0	0	0	0	0	0	1	0	1	0
Morecambe (loan)	2018–19	League Two	21	0	0	0	1	0	3	0	25	0
Chesterfield (loan)	2018–19	National League	15	0	2	0	—		1 (Note: Appearance(s) in FA Trophy)	0	18	0
Chesterfield	2019–20	National League	29	1	2	0	—		0	0	31	1
Chesterfield	2020–21	National League	16	1	0	0	—		2	0	18	1
Chesterfield	Total		45	2	2	0	0	0	2	0	49	2
Weymouth	2021–22	National League	1	0	2	0	—		0	0	3	0
RoundGlass Punjab	2021–22	I-League	15	0	0	0	—		—		15	0
Oldham Athletic	2022–23	National League	22	2	0	0	—		1	0	23	2
Tranmere Rovers	2023–24	League Two	24	0	0	0	2	0	2	0	28	0
Career total			142	4	6	0	3	0	13	0	165	4

== Honours ==
Boreham Wood

- National League South play-offs: 2025

Individual

- Oldham Athletic Supporters' Player of the Year: 2022–23
