= Samuel Taylor (footballer, born 2003) =

English footballer (born 2003)

Personal information
- Full name: Samuel David Taylor
- Date of birth: 23 December 2003 (age 22)
- Height: 1.78 m (5 ft 10 in)
- Position: Winger

Team information
- Current team: Tranmere Rovers
- Number: 20

Youth career
- –2022: Tranmere Rovers

Senior career*
Years	Team	Apps	(Gls)
2022–	Tranmere Rovers	35	(3)
2023	→ Bootle (loan)	9	(1)
2024–2025	→ Oldham Athletic (loan)	1	(0)
2025–2026	→ Linfield (loan)	20	(2)
2026-	Altrincham	0	(0)
- * Club domestic league appearances and goals as of 10:52, 27 June 2026 (UTC)

Samuel David Taylor (born 23 December 2003) is an English professional footballer who plays as a winger for National League club Altrincham.

== Career ==
=== Tranmere Rovers ===
Taylor signed his first professional contract with Tranmere Rovers in January 2022, having scored eleven goals in half-a-season for the under-18 team. He made his first-team debut at Prenton Park on 4 October, in a 5–3 defeat to Leeds United U23 in the EFL Trophy.

In February 2023, he joined Northern Premier League Division One West side Bootle on loan.

On 30 December 2024, he signed a one month loan deal with National League club Oldham Athletic.

On 12 May 2026, Tranmere announced he would be leaving in the summer once his contract expired.

=== Altrincham ===
On 26 June 2026, Taylor agreed to join National League club Altrincham.

== Career statistics ==
As of end of 2025–26 season

Appearances and goals by club, season and competition
Club	Season	League			National Cup (Note: Includes FA Cup and Irish Cup)		League Cup (Note: Includes EFL Cup and Northern Ireland Football League Cup)		Other		Total	
Club	Season	Division	Apps	Goals	Apps	Goals	Apps	Goals	Apps	Goals	Apps	Goals
Tranmere Rovers	2022–23	League Two	4	1	1	0	0	0	2 (Note: Appearance(s) in EFL Trophy)	0	7	1
Tranmere Rovers	2023–24	League Two	20	2	0	0	2	1	3	0	25	3
Tranmere Rovers	2024–25	League Two	11	0	0	0	0	0	3	1	14	1
Tranmere Rovers	2025–26	League Two	0	0	0	0	0	0	0	0	0	0
Tranmere Rovers	Total		35	3	1	0	2	1	8	1	46	5
Bootle (loan)	2022–23	Northern Premier League Division One West	9	1	0	0	—		1 (Note: Appearance(s) in Liverpool Senior Cup)	0	10	1
Oldham Athletic (loan)	2024–25	National League	1	0	0	0	—		1 (Note: Appearance(s) in National League Cup)	0	2	0
Linfield (loan)	2025–26	NIFL Premiership	20	2	2	0	4	0	7 (Note: One appearance in UEFA Europa Conference League, two appearances in County Antrim Shield, four appearances in Premier Division play-offs)	0	33	2
Career total			65	6	3	0	6	1	17	1	91	8
