= Dan Pike =

English association football player (born 2002)

Personal information
- Full name: Daniel Christopher Pike
- Date of birth: 9 January 2002 (age 24)
- Place of birth: Formby, England
- Position: Right-back

Team information
- Current team: Southport

Youth career
- Liverpool
- 2010–2021: Blackburn Rovers

Senior career*
Years	Team	Apps	(Gls)
2021–2023	Blackburn Rovers	0	(0)
2021	→ Fylde (loan)	2	(0)
2021–2022	→ Fylde (loan)	14	(0)
2023	→ Fylde (loan)	10	(0)
2023–2024	Tranmere Rovers	16	(0)
2024	Dundalk	9	(0)
2025–	Southport	13	(1)
- * Club domestic league appearances and goals as of 01:29, 8 March 2025 (UTC)

Daniel Christopher Pike (born 9 January 2002) is an English professional footballer who plays as a right-back for National League North club Southport.

== Career ==
Pike joined Blackburn Rovers when he was 8 years old, having previously been at Liverpool. On 24 June 2020, he signed his first professional contract.

On 9 September 2021, Pike joined Fylde on a month loan. On 21 December 2021, he returned to Fylde on another month loan, which was extended until the end of the season. On 7 March 2023, he rejoined Fylde again on a month loan.

On 19 May 2023, it was announced Pike would be leaving Blackburn Rovers at the end of his contract.

On 28 August 2023, Pike joined Tranmere Rovers on a one-month contract. He made his senior and professional debut in a 2-0 EFL Cup loss against Leicester City on 29 August 2023. He made his league debut in a 1–0 loss against Wrexham on 1 September 2023. On 27 September 2023, Pike signed a new contract until the end of January 2024. On 26 January 2024 it was announced that Pike's contract had been extended until the end of the season. He departed the club at the end of the season.

On 11 July 2024, Pike signed for League of Ireland Premier Division side Dundalk.

== Career statistics ==
As of match played on 9 August 2025

Club	Season	League			National Cup (Note: Includes FA Cup & FAI Cup)		League Cup (Note: Includes EFL Cup)		Other		Total	
Club	Season	Division	Apps	Goals	Apps	Goals	Apps	Goals	Apps	Goals	Apps	Goals
Blackburn Rovers	2021–22	EFL Championship	0	0	—		0	0	–		2	0
Blackburn Rovers	2022–23	EFL Championship	0	0	0	0	0	0	—		0	0
Blackburn Rovers	Total		0	0	0	0	0	0	—		0	0
Fylde (loan)	2021–22	National League North	2	0	2	0	—		—		4	0
Fylde (loan)	2021–22	National League North	14	0	—		—		0	0	14	0
Fylde (loan)	2022–23	National League North	10	0	—		—		—		10	0
Tranmere Rovers	2023–24	EFL League Two	16	0	1	0	1	0	2 (Note: Appearances in the EFL Trophy)	0	20	0
Dundalk	2024	LOI Premier Division	9	0	1	0	—		—		10	0
Southport	2025–26	National League North	1	0	—		—		—		1	0
Career total			52	0	4	0	1	0	2	0	59	0
