= Ben Hockenhull =

English footballer (born 2001)

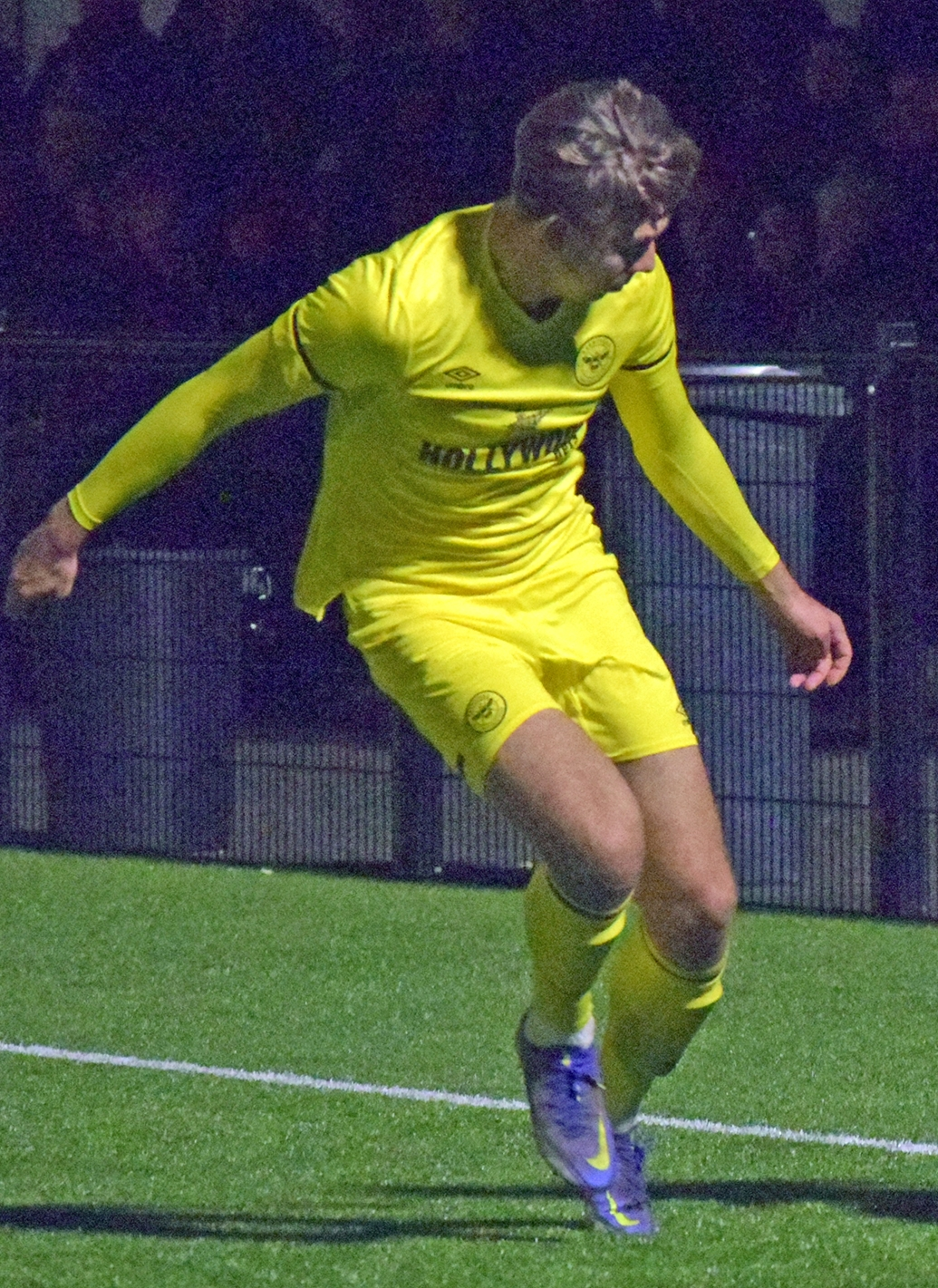
- Hockenhull playing for Brentford B in April 2022.

Personal information
- Full name: Ben William Hockenhull
- Date of birth: 3 September 2001 (age 25)
- Place of birth: Crewe, England
- Height: 1.86 m (6 ft 1 in)
- Position: Central defender

Team information
- Current team: Nantwich Town

Youth career
- 2007–2020: Manchester United
- 2020–2022: Brentford

Senior career*
Years	Team	Apps	(Gls)
2022–2024	Tranmere Rovers	3	(0)
2022–2023	→ Warrington Rylands (loan)	19	(0)
2023	→ Chorley (loan)	1	(0)
2023	→ Spennymoor Town (loan)	6	(1)
2024	→ Southport (loan)	13	(0)
2024	Stafford Rangers	4	(0)
2024–2025	Bury	22	(3)
2025	Curzon Ashton	0	(0)
2025	→ Mossley (dual-reg)	5	(0)
2025	→ Nantwich Town (dual-reg)	9	(1)
2025–	Nantwich Town	1	(0)
- * Club domestic league appearances and goals as of 16:20, 9 August 2025 (UTC)

Ben William Hockenhull (born 3 September 2001) is an English professional footballer who plays as a central defender for Northern Premier League Division One West club Nantwich Town.

Hockenhull is a product of the Manchester United academy and began his professional career with Brentford. Following two seasons of B team football, his senior career began with Tranmere Rovers in 2022. After failing to break into the first team squad, Hockenhull dropped into non-League football in 2024.

== Career ==
=== Manchester United ===
A central defender, Hockenhull entered the Manchester United academy at age six and progressed to sign a scholarship in 2018. Despite having one year remaining on his scholarship, he departed Carrington in July 2020.

=== Brentford ===
On 23 July 2020, Hockenhull transferred to the B team at Brentford and signed a two-year contract, with the option of a further year, for an undisclosed fee. After an injury-hit 2020–21 season spent acclimatising to the rigours of professional football, Hockenhull progressed during the early months of 2021–22 to training with the first team and at times, captaining the B team. He was a part of the B team's 2021–22 London Senior Cup-winning squad and transferred away from the club in May 2022. During two seasons with Brentford B, Hockenhull made 54 appearances and scored one goal.

=== Tranmere Rovers ===
On 27 May 2022, Hockenhull signed a two-year contract with League Two club Tranmere Rovers, effective 10 June 2022. Hockenhull made his debut with a start in a 1–0 EFL Trophy group stage win over Crewe Alexandra on 18 October 2022 and three days later, he joined Northern Premier League Premier Division club Warrington Rylands on a loan that was later extended until the end of the 2022–23 season. He made 20 appearances in all competitions during his spell.

Following 2023–24 pre-season involvement with the first team squad, Hockenhull spent much of the regular season away on loan at National League North clubs Chorley, Spennymoor Town and Southport. Hockenhull make three late-season League Two appearances for Tranmere Rovers, which were his last for the club prior to his release when his contract expired at the end of the season.

=== Non-League football ===
In August 2024, Hockenhull signed a contract with Northern Premier League Division One West club Stafford Rangers. After making four appearances, he transferred to North West Counties League Premier Division club Bury. He made 24 appearances and scored four goals prior to his departure in January 2025. Hockenhull played the second half of the 2024–25 season with Curzon Ashton, but played most of his matches with Mossley and Nantwich Town respectively on a dual-registration basis. He transferred permanently to Nantwich Town in June 2025.

== Personal life ==
Hockenhull is the son of former football manager Andy Hockenhull.

== Career statistics ==
As of match played 9 August 2025

Appearances and goals by club, season and competition
Club	Season	League			FA Cup		League Cup		Other		Total	
Club	Season	Division	Apps	Goals	Apps	Goals	Apps	Goals	Apps	Goals	Apps	Goals
Tranmere Rovers	2022–23	League Two	0	0	0	0	0	0	1 (Note: Appearance in EFL Trophy)	0	1	0
Tranmere Rovers	2023–24	League Two	3	0	0	0	0	0	0	0	3	0
Tranmere Rovers	Total		3	0	0	0	0	0	1	0	4	0
Warrington Rylands (loan)	2022–23	Northern Premier League Premier Division	19	0	0	0	―		1 (Note: Appearance in FA Trophy)	0	20	0
Chorley (loan)	2023–24	National League North	1	0	0	0	―		―		1	0
Spennymoor Town (loan)	2023–24	National League North	6	1	0	0	―		0	0	6	1
Southport (loan)	2023–24	National League North	13	0	0	0	―		1 (Note: Appearance in Lancashire Junior Cup)	0	14	0
Stafford Rangers	2024–25	Northern Premier League Division One West	3	0	1	0	―		0	0	4	0
Bury	2024–25	North West Counties League Premier Division	22	3	0	0	―		2 (Note: Appearances in FA Vase)	1	24	4
Curzon Ashton	2024–25	National League North	0	0	0	0	―		1 (Note: Appearance in Manchester Premier Cup)	0	1	0
Mossley (dual-registration)	2024–25	Northern Premier League Division One West	5	0	0	0	―		0	0	5	0
Nantwich Town (dual-registration)	2024–25	Northern Premier League Division One West	9	1	0	0	―		0	0	9	1
Nantwich Town	2025–26	Northern Premier League Division One West	1	0	0	0	―		0	0	1	0
Career total			82	5	1	0	0	0	6	1	89	6

== Playing style ==
Hockenhull has been described as an "imposing central defender" with "the ability to win the ball in the air, but is also a talented defender with the ball at his feet".

== Honours ==
Brentford B

- London Senior Cup: 2021–22
