= 2023–24 Tranmere Rovers F.C. season =

140th season in existence of Tranmere Rovers FC

Tranmere Rovers
2023–24 season
- Owner: Mark and Nicola Palios
- Chairman: Mark Palios
- Manager: Ian Dawes (until 10 September); Nigel Adkins (interim - since 10 September) (permanent - since 2 November)
- Stadium: Prenton Park
- League Two: 16th
- FA Cup: First round
- EFL Cup: Second round
- EFL Trophy: Group stage
- Top goalscorer: League: Connor Jennings (11); All: Connor Jennings (11)
- Highest home attendance: 10,614 (2 September 2023 vs. Wrexham)
- Lowest home attendance: 678 (10 October 2023 vs. Leicester City U-21s)
- Biggest win: 5-1 (26 December 2023 vs. Salford City); 4-0 (17 February 2024 vs. Stockport County)
- Biggest defeat: 1-4 (30 September 2023 vs. Wimbledon) (27 April 2024 vs. Accrington Stanley)
Home colours	Away colours
- All statistics correct as of 16 March 2024.

The 2023–24 season is the 140th season in the history of Tranmere Rovers and their fourth consecutive season in League Two. The club are participating in League Two, the FA Cup, the EFL Cup, and the 2023–24 EFL Trophy.

== Current squad ==
As of 28 March 2024

No.	Name	Position	Nationality	Place of birth	Date of birth (age)	Previous club	Date signed	Fee	Contract end
Goalkeepers
1	Luke McGee	GK	(England)	Edgware	2 September 1995 (age 31)	Forest Green Rovers	1 July 2023	Free	30 June 2025
13	Joe Murphy	GK	(Republic of Ireland)	Dublin	21 August 1981 (age 45)	Shrewsbury Town	22 August 2020	Free	30 June 2024
29	Conor Robson	GK	(England)	Liverpool	21 September 2003 (age 23)	Cammell Laird	25 September 2023	Free	30 June 2024
Defenders
3	Jake Leake	LB	(England)	Kingston upon Hull	20 February 2003 (age 23)	Hull City	18 July 2023	Loan	31 May 2024
5	Tom Davies	CB	(England)	(England) Warrington	18 April 1992 (age 34)	Bristol Rovers	1 July 2021	Free	30 June 2025
6	Jordan Turnbull	CB	(England)	Trowbridge	30 October 1994 (age 32)	Salford City	26 July 2022	Free	30 June 2024
21	Josef Yarney	CB	(England)	Liverpool	8 October 1997 (age 29)	Oldham Athletic	1 July 2023	Free	30 June 2024
24	Dan Pike	RB	(England)		9 January 2002 (age 24)	Blackburn Rovers	28 August 2023	Free	30 June 2024
26	James Norris	LB	(England)	Liverpool	4 April 2003 (age 23)	Liverpool	1 September 2023	Loan	31 May 2024
27	Connor Wood	LB	(England)	Harlow	17 July 1996 (age 30)	Leyton Orient	8 September 2023	Free	30 June 2024
30	Jean Belehouan	CB	(France)		1 September 2000 (age 26)	Sheffield United	25 September 2023	Free	30 June 2024
31	Joe Starbuck	RB	(England)	Essex	3 August 2002 (age 24)	Sheffield United	25 September 2023	Free	30 June 2024
Midfielders
2	Lee O'Connor	DM	(Republic of Ireland)	Waterford	28 July 2000 (age 26)	(Scotland) Celtic	25 January 2022	Undisclosed	30 June 2024
4	Brad Walker	DM	(England)	Billingham	25 April 1996 (age 30)	Port Vale	12 January 2023	Undisclosed	30 June 2025
7	Kieron Morris	RM	(England)	Hereford	3 June 1994 (age 32)	Walsall	1 July 2019	Free	30 June 2025
8	Regan Hendry	CM	(Scotland)	Edinburgh	21 January 1998 (age 28)	Forest Green Rovers	1 July 2023	Free	30 June 2025
11	Josh Hawkes	LM	(England)	Stockton-on-Tees	28 January 1999 (age 27)	Sunderland	25 January 2022	Undisclosed	30 June 2025
16	Chris Merrie	CM	(England)	Liverpool	2 November 1998 (age 28)	Wigan Athletic	1 July 2021	Free	30 June 2024
22	Paul Lewis	CM	(England)	Liverpool	17 December 1994 (age 31)	Northampton Town	1 July 2022	Free	30 June 2024
23	Reece McAlear	CM	(Scotland)	Glasgow	12 February 2002 (age 24)	Norwich City	1 July 2022	Free	30 June 2024
—N/a	Ousmane Kane	DM	(Senegal)	Guédiawaye	23 July 2001 (age 25)	(Senegal) AS Douanes	6 February 2024	Free	30 June 2024
Forwards
9	Luke Norris	CF	(England)	Stevenage	3 June 1993 (age 33)	Stevenage	1 July 2023	Free	30 June 2024
12	Charlie Jolley	CF	(England)	Liverpool	13 January 2001 (age 25)	Wigan Athletic	25 January 2021	Undisclosed	30 June 2024
14	Kristian Dennis	CF	(England)	Manchester	12 March 1990 (age 36)	Carlisle United	1 July 2023	Free	30 June 2025
18	Connor Jennings	CF	(England)	Manchester	29 October 1991 (age 35)	Hartlepool United	1 July 2023	Free	30 June 2025
19	Harvey Saunders	CF	(England)	Wolverhampton	20 July 1997 (age 29)	Bristol Rovers	27 January 2023	Undisclosed	30 June 2024
20	Samuel Taylor	CF	(England)		23 December 2003 (age 22)	Academy	10 January 2022	Trainee	30 June 2026
25	Rob Apter	RW	(Scotland)	(England) Liverpool	16 January 2003 (age 23)	Blackpool	12 January 2024	Loan	31 May 2024
Out on Loan
15	Ben Hockenhull	CB	(England)	Crewe	3 September 2001 (age 25)	Brentford	1 July 2022	Free	30 June 2024
17	Rhys Hughes	CM	(Wales)	Wrexham	21 September 2001 (age 25)	Everton	1 July 2022	Free	30 June 2024
28	Mikey Davies	LB	(England)	Birkenhead	23 September 2004 (age 22)	Academy	29 August 2023	Trainee	30 June 2024

== Transfers ==
=== In ===
Date	Pos	Player	Transferred from	Fee	Ref
1 July 2023	CF	(England) Kristian Dennis	(England) Carlisle United	Free Transfer	
1 July 2023	CM	(Scotland) Regan Hendry	(England) Forest Green Rovers	Free Transfer	
1 July 2023	CF	(England) Connor Jennings	(England) Hartlepool United	Free Transfer	
1 July 2023	GK	(England) Luke McGee	(England) Forest Green Rovers	Free Transfer	
1 July 2023	CF	(England) Luke Norris	(England) Stevenage	Free Transfer	
21 July 2023	CB	(England) Josef Yarney	(England) Oldham Athletic	Free Transfer	
28 August 2023	RB	(England) Dan Pike	(England) Blackburn Rovers	Free Transfer	
8 September 2023	LB	(England) Connor Wood	Free agent	—N/a	
25 September 2023	CB	(France) Jean Belehouan	Free agent	—N/a	
25 September 2023	GK	(England) Conor Robson	(England) Cammell Laird	Free Transfer	
25 September 2023	RB	(England) Joe Starbuck	Free agent	—N/a	
6 February 2024	DM	(Senegal) Ousmane Kane	(Senegal) AS Douanes	Free Transfer	

=== Out ===
Date	Pos	Player	Transferred to	Fee	Ref
30 June 2023	CF	(England) Jake Burton	(England) Chester	Released	
30 June 2023	RB	(England) Josh Dacres-Cogley	(England) Bolton Wanderers	Free Transfer	
30 June 2023	CM	(England) Max Fisher	(United States) Gardner–Webb Runnin' Bulldogs	Released	
30 June 2023	GK	(Poland) Mateusz Hewelt	(England) Radcliffe	Free Transfer	
30 June 2023	CM	(Kosovo) Florent Hoti	(England) FC Halifax Town	Released	
30 June 2023	CB	(England) Kyle Jameson	(Wales) Newport County	Released	
30 June 2023	AM	(England) Arthur Lomax	(England) Bootle	Released	
30 June 2023	CF	(Sweden) Joel Mumbongo	(Scotland) Hamilton Academical	Released	
30 June 2023	CM	(England) Jon Nolan	(England) Macclesfield	Released	
30 June 2023	AM	(England) Ryan Stratulis	(Wales) Connah's Quay Nomads	Released	
30 June 2023	RW	(England) Jack Williams	Free agent	Released	
18 July 2023	LB	(England) Ethan Bristow	(United States) Minnesota United	Undisclosed	
1 September 2023	CF	(England) Kane Hemmings	(England) Stevenage	Mutual Consent	

=== Loaned in ===
Date	Pos	Player	Loaned from	Until	Ref
18 July 2023	LB	(England) Jake Leake	(England) Hull City	End of Season	
1 September 2023	LB	(England) James Norris	(England) Liverpool	End of Season	
1 September 2023	RW	(Scotland) Rob Apter	(England) Blackpool	1 January 2024	
12 January 2024	RW	(Scotland) Rob Apter	(England) Blackpool	End of Season	

=== Loaned out ===
Date	Pos	Player	Loaned to	Until	Ref
1 August 2023	CB	(England) Luis Lacey	(Wales) Flint Town United		
19 August 2023	CB	(England) Ben Hockenhull	(England) Chorley	16 September 2023	
3 November 2023	CB	(England) Ben Hockenhull	(England) Spennymoor Town	2 December 2023	
17 November 2023	CM	(Wales) Rhys Hughes	(England) Curzon Ashton	End of Season (Note: On 18 December, Hughes' loan at Curzon was extended by a further month.) (Note: On 23 January, Hughes' loan at Curzon was extended again, until the end of season.)	
8 December 2023	LB	(England) Mikey Davies	(England) FC United of Manchester	6 January 2024	
26 January 2024	RB	(England) Luis Lacey	(Wales) Flint Town United	End of Season	
9 February 2024	CB	(England) Ben Hockenhull	(England) Southport	9 March 2024	
8 March 2024	LB	(England) Mikey Davies	(England) Clitheroe	6 April 2024	

== Pre-season and friendlies ==
On 8 June Tranmere Rovers announced their pre-season schedule, with friendlies against Vauxhall Motors, Southport, Fleetwood Town, Rochdale and Everton XI. A sixth pre-season fixture was later added, against Wigan Athletic.

Win Draw Loss Fixtures

8 July 2023 Friendly	Vauxhall Motors	0–0	Tranmere Rovers	Ellesmere Port
14:00 BST		Report		Stadium: Rivacre Park

11 July 2023 Friendly	Southport	1–0	Tranmere Rovers	Blowick
19:15 BST	Hockenhull 83' (o.g.)	Report		Stadium: Haig Avenue; Attendance: 962 (380 Tranmere)

15 July 2023 Friendly	Tranmere Rovers	4–1	Fleetwood Town	Birkenhead
13:00 BST	Hawkes 11', 16'; Davies 30'; 75' (o.g.)	Report	35'	Stadium: The Campus; Attendance: 0 (behind-closed-doors)

18 July 2023 Friendly	Tranmere Rovers	0–2	Rochdale	Birkenhead
13:00 BST		Report	Sinclair 30'; Rodney 75'	Stadium: The Campus; Attendance: 0 (behind closed doors)

22 July 2023 Friendly	Tranmere Rovers	1–1	Everton XI	Birkenhead
14:00 BST	Jennings 47'	Report	Mills 83' (pen.)	Stadium: Prenton Park; Attendance: 3,689

25 July 2023 Friendly	Blackpool	1–2	Tranmere Rovers	Blackpool
13:00 BST	Dale 26'	Report	Jennings 30' (pen.); Walker 32'	Stadium: Bloomfield Road; Attendance: 0 (behind closed doors)

28 July 2023 Friendly	Tranmere Rovers	1–1	Wigan Athletic	Birkenhead
19:00 BST	Saunders 52'	Report	Adams 71'	Stadium: Prenton Park; Attendance: 1,616

== Competitions ==
=== Overall record ===
Competition	First match	Last match	Starting round	Final position	Record							
Competition	First match	Last match	Starting round	Final position	Pld	W	D	L	GF	GA	GD	Win %
League Two	5 August		Matchday 1		39	15	5	19	58	54	+4	38.46
FA Cup	4 November	4 November	First round	First round	1	0	0	1	3	4	−1	0.00
EFL Cup	8 August	29 August	First round	Second round	2	0	1	1	2	4	−2	0.00
EFL Trophy	5 September	14 November	Group stage	group stage	3	0	0	3	0	3	−3	0.00
Total					45	15	6	24	63	65	−2	33.33

Last updated: 16 March 2024
Source: Soccerway

=== League Two ===
==== League table ====
Pos	Team	Pld	W	D	L	GF	GA	GD	Pts
13	Harrogate Town	46	17	12	17	60	69	−9	63
14	Notts County	46	18	7	21	89	86	+3	61
15	Morecambe	46	17	10	19	67	81	−14	58 (Note: On 11 April 2024, Morecambe were deducted three points for failing to pay players and staff on time following previous EFL rules breaches in the 2023–24 season.)
16	Tranmere Rovers	46	17	6	23	67	70	−3	57
17	Accrington Stanley	46	16	9	21	63	71	−8	57
18	Newport County	46	16	7	23	62	76	−14	55
19	Swindon Town	46	14	12	20	77	83	−6	54

Source: EFL Official Website
Rules for classification: 1) Points; 2) Goal difference; 3) Number of goals scored; 4) Head-to-head results; 5) Wins; 6) Away goals; 7) Penalty points (sec 9.5); 8) 12-point sending off offences

==== Results summary ====
Overall								Home						Away					
Pld	W	D	L	GF	GA	GD	Pts	W	D	L	GF	GA	GD	W	D	L	GF	GA	GD
45	17	6	22	66	66	0	57	12	3	8	44	32	+12	5	3	14	22	34	−12

Last updated: 20 April 2024.
Source: Soccerway

==== Matches ====
On 22 June, the EFL League Two fixtures were released.

Win Draw Loss Fixtures

5 August 2023 1	Tranmere Rovers	1–2	Barrow	Birkenhead
15:00 BST	O'Connor (yellow card) 35'; Hawkes 63' (pen.); Hendry (yellow card) 90+6'	Report	Canavan 19'; Campbell (yellow card) 37'; Ray (yellow card) 51'; Spence 70'	Stadium: Prenton Park; Attendance: 6,584; Referee: Ollie Yates

12 August 2023 2	Milton Keynes Dons	1–0	Tranmere Rovers	Milton Keynes
15:00 BST	Eisa 7' (yellow card) 37'; MacGillivray (yellow card) 77'	Report	Davies (yellow card) 27'	Stadium: Stadium MK; Attendance: 5,831; Referee: Sunny Sukhvir Gill

15 August 2023 3	Tranmere Rovers	3–0	Harrogate Town	Birkenhead
19:45 BST	Norris 24', (yellow card) 53'; Taylor 26'; Leake (yellow card) 70'; Morris 89'	Report	Mattock (yellow card) 54'	Stadium: Prenton Park; Attendance: 5,278; Referee: Lee Swabey

19 August 2023 4	Tranmere Rovers	3–4	Salford City	Birkenhead
15:00 BST	Jennings 6'; Dennis 36'; Jolley 87'; Turnbull (yellow card) 90+5'	Report	Lund (yellow card) 9'; Smith 34'; Hendry 46', 68' (yellow card) 70' (goal) 85'	Stadium: Prenton Park; Attendance: 9,594; Referee: Scott Tallis

26 August 2023 5	Notts County	2–1	Tranmere Rovers	Nottingham
15:00 BST	McGoldrick 12'; Crowley (yellow card) 56'; Palmer (yellow card) 60'; Rawlinson 65'; Cameron (yellow card) 90+8'	Report	Jolley (yellow card) 20'; Lewis (yellow card) 30'; Yarney (yellow card) 50'; Hawkes 88'	Stadium: Meadow Lane; Attendance: 10,174; Referee: Thomas Parsons

2 September 2023 6	Tranmere Rovers	0–1	Wrexham	Birkenhead
12:30 BST	Merrie (yellow card) 55'	Report	Hayden 56'; O'Connell (yellow card) 83'	Stadium: Prenton Park; Attendance: 10,614; Referee: Martin Woods

9 September 2023 7	Colchester United	2–0	Tranmere Rovers	Colchester
15:00 BST	Taylor 11'; Hall (yellow card) 15'; Tovide (yellow card) 45+1'; Ihionvien 87'	Report	Hendry (yellow card) 28'; Davies (yellow card) 39'; Jennings (yellow card) 45'; Pike (yellow card) 47'	Stadium: Colchester Community Stadium; Attendance: 3,474; Referee: Declan Bourne

16 September 2023 8	Crawley Town	3–2	Tranmere Rovers	Crawley
15:00 BST	Gladwin (yellow card) 33'; Darcy (yellow card) 56' (goal) 61'; Tsaroulla 68'; Wright (yellow card) 76'; Lolos 90+6' (yellow card) 90+7'	Report	Jolley 21' (yellow card) 60'; Walker (yellow card) 45+2'; Taylor 66'; Pike (yellow card) 74'; Yarney (yellow card) 89'; Hendry (yellow card) 90+4'	Stadium: Broadfield Stadium; Attendance: 2,961; Referee: Alan Young

23 September 2023 9	Tranmere Rovers	2–0	Accrington Stanley	Birkenhead
15:00 BST	Hawkes 14' (pen.), 49'	Report	Savin (yellow card) 14'; Rich-Baghuelou (red card) 42'; Leigh (yellow card) 79'; Hills (yellow card) 90+4'	Stadium: Prenton Park; Attendance: 5,980; Referee: Sam Purkiss

30 September 2023 10	AFC Wimbledon	4–1	Tranmere Rovers	Wimbledon
15:00 BST	Little 21'; Al-Hamadi 32', 62', 88'; Ball (yellow card) 90+5'	Report	Jennings 4' (yellow card) 61'; Turnbull (red card) 54'; O'Connor (yellow card) 90+5'	Stadium: Plough Lane; Attendance: 7,367; Referee: Daniel Middleton

3 October 2023 11	Tranmere Rovers	2–1	Bradford City	Birkenhead
19:45 BST	Hendry 24'; Saunders (yellow card) 32'; O'Connor (yellow card) 39'; Walker (yellow card) 49'; Hawkes (penalty missed) 66'; Morris 83'	Report	Platt (yellow card) 14'; Cook 55'; McDonald (yellow card) 64'; Ridehalgh (yellow card) 78'	Stadium: Prenton Park; Attendance: 5,672; Referee: Scott Oldham

7 October 2023 12	Tranmere Rovers	2–2	Grimsby Town	Birkenhead
15:00 BST	Morris 16' (yellow card) 59'; Jennings 61'	Report	Rose 27'; Pyke 44' (yellow card) 49'	Stadium: Prenton Park; Attendance: 5,968; Referee: Martin Coy

14 October 2023 13	Crewe Alexandra	2–0	Tranmere Rovers	Crewe
15:00 BST	Demetriou 11'; Davies (yellow card) 37'; Long 52'; Tracey (yellow card) 77'; Powell (yellow card) 90+3'	Report	McGee (red card) 48'; Hendry (yellow card) 90+5'; Davies (yellow card) 90+6' (yellow-red card) 90+12'	Stadium: Gresty Road; Attendance: 5,826; Referee: Ross Joyce

20 October 2023 14	Tranmere Rovers	1–2	Doncaster Rovers	Birkenhead
19:45 GMT	Turnbull (yellow card) 11'; Jennings (yellow card) 20' (goal) 70'; Yarney (yellow card) 48'	Report	Biggins 27'; Bailey (yellow card) 38'; Faal 57'; Jones (yellow card) 90+1'	Stadium: Prenton Park; Attendance: 5,835; Referee: Ben Speedie

24 October 2023 15	Morecambe	1–0	Tranmere Rovers	Morecambe
19:45 GMT	Bedeau (yellow card) 63'; Turnbull 72' (o.g.); Mayor (yellow card) 79'	Report	Hendry (yellow card) 45'; Jennings (yellow card) 45+4'	Stadium: The Mazuma Stadium; Attendance: 3,678; Referee: Paul Howard

28 October 2023 16	Stockport County	2–0	Tranmere Rovers	Stockport
15:00 GMT	Olaofe 5'; Sarcevic 54'	Report	Lewis (yellow card) 45'; Saunders (yellow card) 45+2' (yellow-red card) 48'	Stadium: Edgeley Park; Attendance: 9,735; Referee: Christopher Pollard

11 November 2023 17	Tranmere Rovers	3–0	Forest Green Rovers	Birkenhead
15:00 GMT	Omotoye 8' (o.g.); Dennis 47'; Hendry (yellow card) 54'; Apter 71'	Report	Bernard (yellow card) 32' (yellow-red card) 52'; Deeney (yellow card) 45+4'; Johnson (yellow card) 90+7'	Stadium: Prenton Park; Attendance: 6,461; Referee: Edward Duckworth

18 November 2023 18	Sutton United	1–1	Tranmere Rovers	Sutton
15:00 GMT	Smith (yellow card) 45+1'; Coley (yellow card) 82'; John 88'	Report	Goodliffe 17' (o.g.); Wood (yellow card) 66'	Stadium: Gander Green Lane; Attendance: 3,548; Referee: Lee Swabey

25 November 2023 19	Tranmere Rovers	3–1	Gillingham	Birkenhead
15:00 GMT	Jennings (yellow card) 36' (goal) 53'; Dennis (yellow card) 39'; Apter 43', 60'; McAlear (yellow card) 90+6'	Report	Masterson (yellow card) 45'; Lapslie (yellow card) 54'; Mahoney 90+1'	Stadium: Prenton Park; Attendance: 5,283; Referee: Marc Edwards

28 November 2023 20	Mansfield Town	2–2	Tranmere Rovers	Mansfield
19:45 GMT	Reed (yellow card) 25'; Oates 37'; Keillor-Dunn (yellow card) 52'; Swan 79'	Report	Jolley 13'; Turnbull (yellow card) 36' (yellow-red card) 90+3'; Morris (yellow card) 39'; Apter 62'; Leake (yellow card) 67'	Stadium: Field Mill; Attendance: 6,421; Referee: Matthew Corlett

9 December 2023 21	Tranmere Rovers	2–1	Newport County	Birkenhead
15:00 GMT	Morris (yellow card) 45' (goal) 57'; Jennings 88'; Dennis (yellow card) 90+2'; Jolley (yellow card) 90+7'	Report	Evans 22'; Clarke (yellow card) 54'; Bondswell (yellow card) 84'; Morris (yellow card) 90+4'	Stadium: Prenton Park; Referee: Seb Stockbridge

15 December 2023 22	Walsall	1–0	Tranmere Rovers	Walsall
15:00 GMT	Daniels (yellow card) 50'; Matt 64' (yellow card) 83'; McEntee (yellow card) 69'; Comley (yellow card) 73'	Report	Belehouan (yellow card) 84'	Stadium: Bescot Stadium; Attendance: 5,190; Referee: Alan Young

23 December 2023 23	Tranmere Rovers	2–1	Swindon Town	Birkenhead
15:00 GMT	Jennings (yellow card) 42'; Morris 55'; Walker (yellow card) 57'; Davies 72'	Report	Kemp 22'; Shade (yellow card) 82'; Young (yellow card) 89'; Hutton (yellow card) 90+4'	Stadium: Prenton Park; Attendance: 5,894; Referee: Sunny Sukhvir Gill

26 December 2023 24	Salford City	1–5	Tranmere Rovers	Kersal
15:00 GMT	Watt (yellow card) 45+2'; McAleny (yellow card) 45+3' (yellow-red card) 72'; Lund 55'; Smith (yellow card) 87'; Garbutt (yellow card) 90+4'	Report	Saunders 12'; Morris 35'; Turnbull (yellow card) 45'; Jennings 50'; Hendry 64'; Hawkes 90+3'	Stadium: Moor Lane; Attendance: 4,576; Referee: Ben Toner

29 December 2023 25	Harrogate Town	0–2	Tranmere Rovers	Harrogate
19:45 GMT	Gibson (yellow card) 64'	Report	Jolley 54'; Davies 70'; McAlear (yellow card) 80'; McGee (yellow card) 83'	Stadium: Wetherby Road; Attendance: 3,105; Referee: Tom Reeves

1 January 2024 26	Tranmere Rovers	4–2	Notts County	Birkenhead
15:00 GMT	Morris 5'; Jennings 44', (penalty missed) 60', (yellow card) 72', (goal) 90+3' (pen.); Saunders 56'	Report	Nemane 24'; Langstaff 29'; Bostock (yellow card) 45+4'	Stadium: Prenton Park; Attendance: 2,828; Referee: Ollie Yates

6 January 2024 27	Barrow	1–0	Tranmere Rovers	Barrow-in-Furness
15:00 GMT	Campbell 80'; Foley (yellow card) 88'	Report	Walker (yellow card) 39'; Norris (yellow card) 73'	Stadium: Holker Street; Attendance: 4,023; Referee: Adam Herczeg

13 January 2024 28	Tranmere Rovers	1–2	Milton Keynes Dons	Birkenhead
15:00 GMT	Morris 12'; Apter (yellow card) 45+2'	Report	Gilbey 9'; Harrison 90+6'	Stadium: Prenton Park; Attendance: 6,862; Referee: Darren Drysdale

27 January 2024 30	Grimsby Town	1–2	Tranmere Rovers	Cleethorpes
15:00 GMT	Rose (yellow card) 4'; Tharme 39'	Report	Apter 35'; Mullarkey 54' (o.g.); Jolley (yellow card) 58'; Lewis (yellow card) 90+6'	Stadium: Blundell Park; Attendance: 6,421; Referee: Paul Howard

3 February 2024 31	Tranmere Rovers	0–0	Crewe Alexandra	Birkenhead
15:00 GMT	Walker (yellow card) 87'	Report	Nevitt (yellow card) 47'; Long (yellow card) 61'; Thomas (yellow card) 76'; Baker-Richardson (yellow card) 90+3'	Stadium: Prenton Park; Attendance: 7,169; Referee: Carl Brook

10 February 2024 32	Doncaster Rovers	2–1	Tranmere Rovers	Doncaster
15:00 GMT	Craig (yellow card) 12'; Ironside 15'; Adelakun 64'	Report	Apter (yellow card) 42'; Jennings (yellow card) 42'; Hawkes 60'; Davies (yellow card) 71'	Stadium: The Eco-Power Stadium; Attendance: 6,389; Referee: John Busby

13 February 2024 33	Tranmere Rovers	2–3	Morecambe	Birkenhead
19:45 GMT	Apter 4'; Jennings 10' (pen.); Hendry (yellow card) 27'; Morris (yellow card) 33'; Saunders (yellow card) 55'; Hawkes (yellow card) 75'; Lewis (yellow card) 90+4'	Report	Brown 14'; Adams (yellow card) 41'; Khumbeni (yellow card) 57'; Slew 82'; Davenport 90+5'	Stadium: Prenton Park; Attendance: 5,486; Referee: Ben Speedie

17 February 2024 34	Tranmere Rovers	4–0	Stockport County	Birkenhead
15:00 GMT	Davies 30'; Turnbull 55', 63', (yellow card) 84'; Jennings 85'	Report	Wootton (yellow card) 84'; Madden (yellow card) 84'	Stadium: Prenton Park; Attendance: 7,882; Referee: Alex Chilowicz

24 February 2024 35	Forest Green Rovers	1–0	Tranmere Rovers	Nailsworth
15:00 GMT	Thompson (yellow card) 44'; McCann 45+1'; Inniss (yellow card) 61' (yellow-red card) 88'	Report	Davies (yellow card) 76'; Turnbull (yellow card) 77'	Stadium: The New Lawn; Attendance: 2,308; Referee: Dale Baines

27 February 2024 29	Swindon Town	3–1	Tranmere Rovers	Swindon
19:45 GMT	McGurk 23'; Hepburn-Murphy 35', 64'; McCarthy (yellow card) 39'; Devoy (yellow card) 61'	Report	Apter 25'; Merrie (yellow card) 90+2'	Stadium: County Ground; Attendance: 7,245; Referee: Martin Woods
Note: Fixture was originally scheduled for 20 January, but was postponed due to a frozen surface.

2 March 2024 36	Tranmere Rovers	1–0	Sutton United	Birkenhead
15:00 GMT	Jennings (yellow card) 15', (penalty missed) 55'; Walker (yellow card) 16'; Saunders (yellow card) 37'; Apter 87'	Report	Adom-Malaki (yellow card) 15'; Lakin (yellow card) 65'; Coley (yellow card) 69'	Stadium: Prenton Park; Attendance: 5,423; Referee: Ruebyn Ricardo

9 March 2024 37	Gillingham	1–1	Tranmere Rovers	Gillingham
15:00 GMT	Dieng (yellow card) 29'; Masterson 84'	Report	Hendry 4' (yellow card) 90'; Merrie (yellow card) 10'; McGee (yellow card) 90'	Stadium: Priestfield Stadium; Attendance: 6,077; Referee: James Linngton

12 March 2024 38	Tranmere Rovers	2–1	Mansfield Town	Birkenhead
19:45 GMT	Hendry 12'; Walker (yellow card) 54'; Apter 56'; Yarney (yellow card) 87'	Report	Swan 39'; Maris (yellow card) 46'; Reed (yellow card) 54'; Williams (yellow card) 59'; Quinn (yellow card) 89'	Stadium: Prenton Park; Attendance: 5,488; Referee: Ben Toner

16 March 2024 39	Wrexham	0–1	Tranmere Rovers	Wrexham
15:00 BST	Lee (yellow card) 12'; Cannon (yellow card) 77'	Report	Yarney (yellow card) 7'; Norris 8'; Hendry (yellow card) 33'	Stadium: Racecourse Ground; Attendance: 12,519; Referee: Scott Oldham

23 March 2024 40	Tranmere Rovers	1–3	Crawley Town	Birkenhead
15:00 BST	Norris 21'; Jennings (yellow card) 35'	Report	Kelly 2', (yellow card) 50'; Williams 10'; Orsi 79'	Stadium: Prenton Park; Referee: Stephen Parkinson

29 March 2024 41	Bradford City	2–0	Tranmere Rovers	Bradford
15:00 GMT	Platt (yellow card) 48'; Smallwood (yellow card) 53'; Kavanagh 64'; Pointon 69'	Report	Pike (yellow card) 26'; Norris (yellow card) 50'; Apter (yellow card) 63'	Stadium: Valley Parade; Attendance: 18,009; Referee: Richie Watkins

1 April 2024 42	Tranmere Rovers	1–1	Colchester United	Birkenhead
15:00 GMT	Morris 7'; Jennings (yellow card) 45+4'; Hendry (yellow card) 90+9'	Report	Smith 8'; Fevrier (yellow card) 35'; Hall (yellow card) 38'; McGeehan (yellow card) 40'; Mingi (yellow card) 77'	Stadium: Prenton Park; Attendance: 5,923; Referee: Scott Tallis

6 April 2024 43	Tranmere Rovers	1–3	Walsall	Birkenhead
15:00 BST	Hendry 24'; O'Connor (yellow card) 40'; Davies (yellow card) 56'	Report	Stirk (yellow card) 36'; Matt 45+2'; Allen 57'; Comley 68'; Gordon (yellow card) 90+3'	Stadium: Prenton Park; Attendance: 5,849; Referee: Seb Stockbridge

13 April 2024 44	Newport County	1–2	Tranmere Rovers	Newport
15:00 BST (UTC+1)	Evans 20'	Report	Apter 25', 36'	Stadium: Rodney Parade; Attendance: Craig Hicks; Referee: 4,549

20 April 2024 45	Tranmere Rovers	3–2	AFC Wimbledon	Birkenhead
15:00 GMT	Saunders 35'; Apter 45'; Jennings 71'	Report	Lewis (yellow card) 45+6'; Kelly 56', 90+5'; O'Toole (red card) 59'	Stadium: Prenton Park; Attendance: 6,456; Referee: David Rock

27 April 2024 46	Accrington Stanley	4–1	Tranmere Rovers	Accrington
15:00 BST	Shipley 4'; Nolan 51' (pen.), 82' (pen.); Henderson 53'		Norris 2'	Stadium: Crown Ground; Referee: Martin Woods

=== FA Cup ===
Rovers were drawn away to Stevenage in the first round.

Win Draw Loss Fixtures

4 November 2023 First Round	Stevenage	4–3	Tranmere Rovers	Stevenage
15:00 GMT	Roberts 3'; Butler (yellow card) 37'; Reid 58' (pen.), 90+10'; Hemmings 81' (yellow card) 88'	Report	Norris 28' (pen.); Merrie (yellow card) 38'; Apter 55'; Walker (yellow card) 67'; Morris 90+1'	Stadium: Broadhall Way; Attendance: 2,404; Referee: Neil Hair

=== EFL Cup ===
Tranmere were drawn away to Barnsley in the first round and at home to Leicester City in the second round.

Win Draw Loss Fixtures

8 August 2023 First round	Barnsley	2–2 (6–7 p)	Tranmere Rovers	Barnsley
19:45 BST	Kane 45+3'; Marsh 90+8'	Report	Norris 23'; Taylor 47'	Stadium: Oakwell; Attendance: 4,343; Referee: Thomas Kirk
	Penalties
	Marsh (penalty missed); Jalo (penalty scored); Chapman (penalty scored); Nejman (penalty scored); Cotter (penalty scored); Łopata (penalty scored); Killip (penalty scored); Shepherd (penalty missed)		(penalty scored) Hawkes; (penalty scored) Jennings; (penalty scored) Hemmings; (penalty missed) Hendry; (penalty scored) McAlear; (penalty scored) Saunders; (penalty scored) Leake; (penalty scored) Lewis

29 August 2023 Second round	Tranmere Rovers	0–2	Leicester City	Birkenhead
19:45 BST	Jennings (yellow card) 62'; Davies (yellow card) 64'; Merrie (yellow card) 90+4'	Report	Ndidi 55'; Vardy 59'; Faes (yellow card) 65'	Stadium: Prenton Park; Attendance: 6,610; Referee: Ben Toner

=== EFL Trophy ===
In the group stage, Tranmere Rovers were drawn into Northern Group D with Wigan Athletic, Fleetwood Town and Leicester City Under-21s.

Pos	Div	Team	Pld	W	PW	PL	L	GF	GA	GD	Pts	Qualification
1	L1	Wigan Athletic	3	1	2	0	0	10	4	+6	7	Advance to Round 2
2	L1	Fleetwood Town	3	2	0	1	0	9	3	+6	7	Advance to Round 2
3	ACA	Leicester City U21	3	1	0	0	2	2	11	−9	3	
4	L2	Tranmere Rovers	3	0	0	1	2	0	3	−3	1	

Updated to match(es) played on 14 November 2023. Source: EFL.com

Win Draw Loss Fixtures

5 September 2023 Group stage	Fleetwood Town	2–0	Tranmere Rovers	Fleetwood
19:00 BST	Graydon (yellow card) 31'; Mayor (yellow card) 44'; Vela (yellow card) 58'; Stockley 73' (pen.); Patterson 82'; Rooney (yellow card) 83'; Teale (yellow card) 90+5'	Report	Pike (yellow card) 23' (yellow-red card) 72'; Jolley (yellow card) 83'; Turnbull (yellow card) 84'	Stadium: Highbury Stadium; Referee: Scott Simpson

10 October 2023 Group stage	Tranmere Rovers	0–1	Leicester City U21	Birkenhead
19:00 BST	Apter (yellow card) 90+5'	Report	Thomas 9'; Wilson-Brown (yellow card) 90+3'; Pennant (yellow card) 90+7'	Stadium: Prenton Park; Attendance: 678; Referee: Adam Herczeg

14 November 2023 Group stage	Tranmere Rovers	0–0 (5–6 p)	Wigan Athletic	Birkenhead
19:00 GMT		Report	Payne (yellow card) 70'; Stones (yellow card) 87'; McManaman (yellow card) 87'	Stadium: Prenton Park; Referee: Simon Mather
	Penalties
	Morris (penalty scored); Hughes (penalty scored); Jolley (penalty scored); Norris (penalty scored); Saunders (penalty missed); Taylor (penalty missed); Davies (penalty scored); Pike (penalty scored)		McManaman (penalty scored); Humphrys (penalty scored); Pearce (penalty scored); Sze (penalty scored); Stones (penalty missed); Balagizi (penalty missed); McHugh (penalty scored); Watts (penalty scored)
