= Billy Chadwick (footballer) =

English association football player

Personal information
- Full name: William Anthony Chadwick
- Date of birth: 19 January 2000 (age 26)
- Place of birth: Kingston upon Hull, England
- Position: Striker

Team information
- Current team: Gateshead
- Number: 21

Youth career
- 2011–2019: Hull City

Senior career*
Years	Team	Apps	(Gls)
2019–2023	Hull City	3	(0)
2019–2020	→ Gainsborough Trinity (loan)	7	(0)
2020–2021	→ FC Halifax Town (loan)	5	(3)
2021	→ FC Halifax Town (loan)	13	(2)
2021	→ Linfield (loan)	18	(1)
2023	→ Boston United (loan)	20	(11)
2023–2024	Stockport County	0	(0)
2023–2024	→ Gateshead (loan)	23	(5)
2024–2026	York City	39	(4)
2024	→ Boston United (loan)	4	(0)
2025	→ Scunthorpe United (loan)	11	(1)
2026-	Gateshead	0	(0)
- * Club domestic league appearances and goals as of 21:21, 1 October 2025 (UTC)

William Anthony Chadwick (born 19 January 2000) is an English professional footballer who plays as a forward for Gateshead.

== Professional career ==
A youth product of Hull City since he was 11, Chadwick joined Gainsborough Trinity on loan in 2019. He made his professional debut with Hull City in a 1–1 (8–9) EFL Cup penalty shootout win over Leeds on 16 September 2020.

On 27 November 2020, Chadwick signed a new one-and-a-half-year deal with the club.

On 19 December 2020, Chadwick joined FC Halifax Town on a month-long loan. He went straight into the FA Trophy match against Hartlepool United, scoring his first goal in the 3–3 draw and converted a penalty to put Halifax through 4–2 on penalties. On 14 January 2021, Chadwick was recalled from the loan by his parent club Hull City. On 5 March 2021, he returned to Halifax for a month-long loan spell. On 29 March 2021, the loan was extended for the remainder of the season.

On 9 July 2021, Chadwick joined Linfield on loan until January 2022 and on 3 August scored against CS Fola Esch in the third round of the qualifying stages for the UEFA Europa Conference League. But on 24 November, he returned from his loan spell at Linfield because of an anterior cruciate ligament knee injury.

On 5 January 2023, Chadwick joined Boston United on a month-long loan spell, which was extended for a further month on 2 February 2023 and on 6 March 2023 extended for the rest of the season. Having registered six goal involvements in five matches, he was awarded the National League North Player of the Month award for March 2023. He was released by Hull at the end of the 2022–23 season.

On 19 June 2023, he was announced to be joining League Two club Stockport County on a one-year deal, with the option for a further year. On 1 August 2023, he joined National League club Gateshead on a season-long loan deal.

On 2 January 2024, Chadwick was recalled from his loan spell at Gateshead, in order to facilitate a permanent transfer to National League club York City. In November 2024, he returned to Boston United on an initial one-month loan deal.

On 14 July 2025, Chadwick joined fellow National League side Scunthorpe United on a six month loan deal.

== Career statistics ==
As of 29 April 2023.

Club	Season	League			National cup (Note: Includes FA Cup)		League cup (Note: Includes EFL Cup, Northern Ireland Football League Cup)		Other		Total	
Club	Season	Division	Apps	Goals	Apps	Goals	Apps	Goals	Apps	Goals	Apps	Goals
Hull City	2020–21	League One	3	0	1	0	1	0	4 (Note: Appearances in EFL Trophy)	0	9	0
Gainsborough Trinity (loan)	2019–20	Northern Premier League	7	0	0	0	–		1 (Note: Appearance in FA Trophy)	0	8	0
FC Halifax Town (loan)	2020–21	National League	17	4	0	0	–		1	1	18	5
Linfield (loan)	2021–22	NIFL Premiership	12	0	0	0	3	5	3 (Note: Appearances in UEFA Europa Conference League)	1	18	6
Boston United (loan)	2022–23	National League North	20	11	0	0	–		–		20	11
Career total			59	15	1	0	4	5	9	2	73	22
