= Joe Starbuck =

English footballer (born 2002)

Personal information
- Full name: Joseph Richard Starbuck
- Date of birth: 3 August 2002 (age 24)
- Place of birth: Lincoln, England
- Height: 1.82 m (6 ft 0 in)
- Positions: Full back; midfielder

Team information
- Current team: Scunthorpe United
- Number: 21

Youth career
- –2019: Grimsby Town

Senior career*
Years	Team	Apps	(Gls)
2019–2021	Grimsby Town	6	(0)
2021–2023	Sheffield United	0	(0)
2022	→ Kidderminster Harriers (loan)	6	(0)
2022–2023	→ Boston United (loan)	5	(0)
2023–2024	Tranmere Rovers	1	(0)
2025–	Scunthorpe United	17	(0)
- * Club domestic league appearances and goals as of 11:12, 15 February 2025 (UTC)

Joseph Richard Starbuck (born 3 August 2002) is an English professional footballer who plays as a midfielder and full back for National League club Scunthorpe United.

He came through the youth academy at Grimsby Town and was promoted to the first team during the 2019–20 season before going on to make six first team appearances. He joined Sheffield United in 2021 and has largely featured for the U23s. He has since spent time on loan with Kidderminster Harriers and Boston United.

== Career ==
=== Grimsby Town ===
After progressing through Grimsby Town's academy, on 3 September 2019, Starbuck made his debut for Grimsby in a 2–1 EFL Trophy defeat against Scunthorpe United.

Following Grimsby's relegation from the Football League at the end of the 2020–21 season, Starbuck was transfer listed by manager Paul Hurst with the player being made available subject to a sell on clause being activated in any potential deal.

=== Sheffield United ===
On 8 September 2021, Grimsby announced they had reached an agreement to let Starbuck sign for Sheffield United, where he will be featuring firstly for the Under-23 team under former Grimsby player Jack Lester.

Ahead of United's FA Cup tie with Wolverhampton Wanderers, Starbuck was called into the first team squad and given shirt number 39. He was an unused substitute in a 3-0 defeat to the Premier League side.

On 21 October 2022, Starbuck joined National League North club Kidderminster Harriers on a one-month loan deal.

On 7 December 2022, Starbuck joined National League North side Boston United on a one-month loan deal.

Starbuck was released at the end of the 2022–23 season and joined EFL League One club Cheltenham Town on trial. After a week with the club manager Wade Elliott stated that the club were not in a position to offer him a deal and had allowed him to trial elsewhere.

=== Tranmere Rovers ===
On 25 September 2023, Starbuck signed for Tranmere Rovers on a short-term contract following a successful trial. Having made only two appearances in all competitions, he was released at the end of the 2023–24 season.

=== Scunthorpe United ===
On 14 February 2025, Starbuck joined National League North side Scunthorpe United on a short-term deal following a successful trial period.

== Career statistics ==
As of end of 2023–24 season.

Appearances and goals by club, season and competition
Club	Season	League			FA Cup		League Cup		Other		Total	
Club	Season	Division	Apps	Goals	Apps	Goals	Apps	Goals	Apps	Goals	Apps	Goals
Grimsby Town	2019–20	League Two	0	0	0	0	0	0	1 (Note: Appearance(s) in EFL Trophy)	0	1	0
Grimsby Town	2020–21	League Two	6	0	0	0	0	0	2	0	8	0
Grimsby Town	Total		6	0	0	0	0	0	3	0	9	0
Tranmere Rovers	2023–24	League Two	1	0	0	0	0	0	1	0	2	0
Career total			7	0	0	0	0	0	4	0	11	0

== Honours ==
Scunthorpe United

- National League North play-offs: 2025
