= Jéan Belehouan =

French footballer (born 2000)

Personal information
- Full name: Seri Jéan Leroy Belehouan
- Date of birth: 1 September 2000 (age 26)
- Place of birth: Ivory Coast
- Height: 1.90 m (6 ft 3 in)
- Position: Centre-back

Team information
- Current team: Scunthorpe United
- Number: 4

Youth career
- 2010–2017: Manchester United
- 2017–2023: Sheffield United

Senior career*
Years	Team	Apps	(Gls)
2021–2023	Sheffield United	0	(0)
2021	→ FC Halifax Town (loan)	1	(0)
2022	→ Farsley Celtic (loan)	6	(0)
2022	→ Boston United (loan)	14	(1)
2023–2024	Tranmere Rovers	6	(0)
2024–2025	Gateshead	24	(0)
2025–	Scunthorpe United	11	(1)
- * Club domestic league appearances and goals as of 10 December 2025

Seri Jéan Leroy Belehouan (born 1 September 2000), known as Jean Belehouan, is an Ivorian professional footballer who plays as a centre-back for Scunthorpe United.

== Early career ==
Belehouan was born in the Ivory Coast to Ivorian parents but the family moved to Salford, England when Jéan was around one years-old. scouted by the Manchester United Academy whilst playing for a local club in Salford. Initially a midfielder, he converted to a defender following a growth spurt aged fifteen.

== Career ==
Following seven years with Manchester United, Belehouan joined Sheffield United in 2017. In January 2021, he joined National League club FC Halifax Town on loan until the end of the season. Having signed a first professional contract, he spent time on loan with National League North clubs Farsley Celtic and Boston United across 2022. He was released by Sheffield United at the end of the 2022–23 season.

Following his release, he spent time on trial with League Two club AFC Wimbledon before signing for Tranmere Rovers of the same division in September 2023 on a short-term contract. He was released at the end of the 2023–24 season.

On 17 August 2024, Belehouan joined National League side Gateshead on a one-year deal with the option to extend. He was released at the end of the 2024–25 season.

On 1 July 2025, Belehouan joined newly promoted National League side Scunthorpe United.

== Career statistics ==
As of end of 2024–25 season

Appearances and goals by club, season and competition
Club	Season	League			FA Cup		League Cup		Other		Total	
Club	Season	Division	Apps	Goals	Apps	Goals	Apps	Goals	Apps	Goals	Apps	Goals
Sheffield United	2020–21	Premier League	0	0	0	0	0	0	0	0	0	0
Sheffield United	2021–22	Championship	0	0	0	0	0	0	0	0	0	0
Sheffield United	2022–23	Championship	0	0	0	0	0	0	0	0	0	0
Sheffield United	Total		0	0	0	0	0	0	0	0	0	0
FC Halifax Town (loan)	2020–21	National League	1	0	0	0	—		1 (Note: Appearance(s) in FA Trophy)	0	2	0
Farsley Celtic (loan)	2021–22	National League North	6	0	—		—		0	0	6	0
Boston United (loan)	2022–23	National League North	14	1	2	0	—		0	0	16	1
Tranmere Rovers	2023–24	League Two	6	0	0	0	0	0	2 (Note: Appearance(s) in EFL Trophy)	0	8	0
Gateshead	2024–25	National League	24	0	0	0	0	0	0	0	24	0
Career total			51	1	2	0	0	0	3	0	56	1
