= Tyrell Sellars-Fleming =

English footballer (born 2005)

Personal information
- Date of birth: 31 May 2005 (age 21)
- Place of birth: Lincoln, England
- Height: 6 ft 0 in (1.83 m)
- Position: Forward

Team information
- Current team: Scunthorpe United (on loan from Hull City)
- Number: 16

Youth career
- Lowlands JFC
- Phoenix United FC
- 2020–2022: Scunthorpe United

Senior career*
Years	Team	Apps	(Gls)
2022–2023	Scunthorpe United	2	(0)
2022–2023	→ Gainsborough Trinity (loan)	9	(1)
2023–	Hull City	6	(0)
2025	→ Gateshead (loan)	15	(1)
2025–2026	→ Scunthorpe United (loan)	14	(5)
2026	→ Grimsby Town (loan)	8	(1)
2026–	→ Scunthorpe United (loan)	7	(2)
- * Club domestic league appearances and goals as of 31 October 2026

Tyrell Sellars-Fleming (born 31 May 2005) is an English professional footballer who plays as a forward for National League club Scunthorpe United, on loan from Hull City.

== Career ==
=== Scunthorpe United ===
Sellars-Fleming is a youth product of Lowlands JFC and Phoenix United FC, before moving to Scunthorpe United in 2020. He signed his first academy contract in 2021 and being promoted in 26 May of the same year. On 17 February 2023, he moved to Gainsborough Trinity on a short-term loan in the Northern Premier League.

=== Hull City ===
On 21 August 2023, he moved to Hull City on a 2+1 year contract where he was originally assigned to their youth sides. He debuted with Hull City as a substitute in a 2–0 loss to Queens Park Rangers on 9 December 2023.

On 2 November 2024, Sellars-Fleming signed a new two-and-a-half year contract with Hull City.

On 14 February 2025, Sellars-Fleming joined Gateshead on loan until the end of the season.

In September 2025, Sellars-Fleming returned to National League club Scunthorpe United on an initial one-month loan before being extended for a further three months. On the conclusion of his loan spell on 8 January 2026, he returned to Hull.

On 9 January 2026, he signed for EFL League Two side Grimsby Town on a loan deal until the end of the season. He scored his first goal for the club and subsequently his first goal in the EFL in a 1–0 win over Accrington Stanley on 11 February 2026.

On 3 September 2026, Sellars-Fleming returned to Scunthorpe United for a second loan spell, joining the National League club on loan from Hull City for the remainder of the 2026–27 season.

Two days later, he was named in the starting line-up for a 2–0 home defeat against Harrogate Town, making his first appearance since returning to the club. Sellars-Fleming scored the first goal of his second loan spell on 12 September, completing a 2–0 victory away to Sutton United.

== Personal life ==
Sellars-Fleming is the son of the footballer Terry Fleming, and brother of the footballer Jerell Sellars. He is of Jamaican descent through his father.
