= Scunthorpe United F.C. =

Association football club in Scunthorpe, England

Scunthorpe United
- Full name: Scunthorpe United Football Club
- Nickname: The Iron
- Founded: 1899; 127 years ago
- Ground: Glanford Park
- Capacity: 9,088
- Chairwoman: Michelle Harness
- Manager: Andy Preece
- League: National League
- 2025–26: National League, 5th of 24
- Website: scunthorpe-united.co.uk
Home colours	Away colours

Scunthorpe United Football Club is a professional association football club based in Scunthorpe, North Lincolnshire, England. The team competes in the National League, the fifth tier of the English football league system.

The club was formed in 1899 and turned professional after joining the Midland League in 1912. Crowned league champions in the 1926–27 and 1938–39 seasons, they were elected into the Football League in 1950. They went on to secure promotion as champions of the Third Division North in 1957–58 and spent six seasons in the Second Division, before they were relegated in 1964, then again to the Fourth Division in 1968. The club spent 34 of the next 37 seasons in the Fourth Division, securing promotions to the Third Division in 1971–72, 1982–83, and 1998–99.

The appointment of Brian Laws as manager saw the club promoted to League One at the end of the 2004–05 season, and his successor, Nigel Adkins, led the club to the League One title in 2006–07. Scunthorpe spent one season in the Championship before being relegated, but victory in the 2009 League One play-off final saw the club promoted back to the Championship. They remained in the second tier for two seasons until two relegations in two seasons saw them back in the fourth tier by 2013. Scunthorpe were promoted to League One at the end of the 2013–14 season and remained there until their relegation to League Two in the 2018–19 season. In the 2021–22 season, the club was relegated to the National League, ending a 72-year spell in the Football League. A year later, the club was relegated to the National League North. At the end of the 2024–25 season, Scunthorpe were promoted back to the National League.

The team is nicknamed "The Iron", and has played in a home kit of claret and blue for most of the club's history. They play their home games at Glanford Park, currently known as The Attis Arena for sponsorship reasons, having moved from their original stadium, the Old Show Ground, in 1988. They used to contest Humber derby games with local rivals Doncaster Rovers, Grimsby Town and Hull City, as well as Lincolnshire derby games with Boston United, Gainsborough Trinity and Lincoln City.

== History ==
=== 1899–1958: Early years ===
Chart of table positions of Scunthorpe in the Football League.

Scunthorpe United was formed in 1899. In 1910, they merged with local rivals North Lindsey United to become Scunthorpe & Lindsey United and joined the Midland Football League in 1912. After an unsuccessful application to join the Football League in 1921, Scunthorpe & Lindsey won the Midland League in 1926–27 and in 1938–39. Following the end of the 1939–40 season due to the outbreak of the Second World War, Scunthorpe & Lindsey finished as runners-up in an emergency competition, losing 3–2 to Peterborough United in an unofficial play-off game.

After the end of the war in 1945, Scunthorpe & Lindsey United continued to apply to join the Football League. The club finished as runners-up in the Midland League in 1947–48, and in 1950 was accepted into the Football League when the league structure was expanded, ahead of Workington and Wigan Athletic. The club's first game in Third Division North was against fellow new entrants Shrewsbury Town.

After an unremarkable few years in the Football League, including the club's first-ever third and fourth-round FA Cup ties against Tottenham Hotspur and Portsmouth respectively, the "& Lindsey" was dropped from the club's name in 1958.

=== 1958–1964: The Second Division years ===
In 1958, Scunthorpe United won promotion to the Second Division as champions of the Third Division North under manager Ron Suart. The Iron then began a steady rise through the Second Division over the next four years under a variety of managers, improving its league position each season until finishing fourth in the 1961–62 season, the club's highest league finish to date. This was despite the sale of its leading goalscorer Barrie Thomas to Newcastle United for a reported £40,000.

The year 1962 proved to be a turning point in the fortunes of the club, and in 1964 they finished bottom of the Second Division and were relegated to the now national Third Division. At the same time Scunthorpe United stalwart Jack Brownsword retired after 597 Football League appearances for the club, and Freddie Goodwin replaced Dick Duckworth as the club's manager.

=== 1964–1987: Decline and stagnation ===
After relegation from Division Two, the Iron spent the next four years in the Third Division. Freddie Goodwin left the club during the 1967–68 season, and was replaced by Ron Ashman. The club was relegated to Division Four at the end of the season. A slight resurgence occurred in the early 1970s, including a win against First Division Sheffield Wednesday in the FA Cup in January 1970 promotion to the Third Division in 1972. Notably, Kevin Keegan made 124 appearances and scored 18 goals for Scunthorpe during this period, and was sold to Liverpool in 1971 for £35,000.

The Iron were unable to cement a place in the Third Division, and were relegated back to the Fourth Division in 1973. At the same time, Ashman departed for local rivals Grimsby Town, only to return in 1976. The period between his two tenures saw several management changes and the club finished bottom of the Football League in 1975. In 1980, the club signed England international cricketer Ian Botham, who played until 1984, making 14 appearances. He was also a regular in the Central League for Scunthorpe United Reserves, once scoring a hat-trick against Blackpool at the Old Show Ground. The next five years saw the club remain in the bottom half of Division Four, finishing second-bottom in 1981–82. The club was promoted to Division Three under manager John Duncan in 1983, but they were immediately relegated under his successor Allan Clarke, with United then entering a further period of stagnation in the middle of the Fourth Division table.

=== 1987–1997: New home, new horizons ===
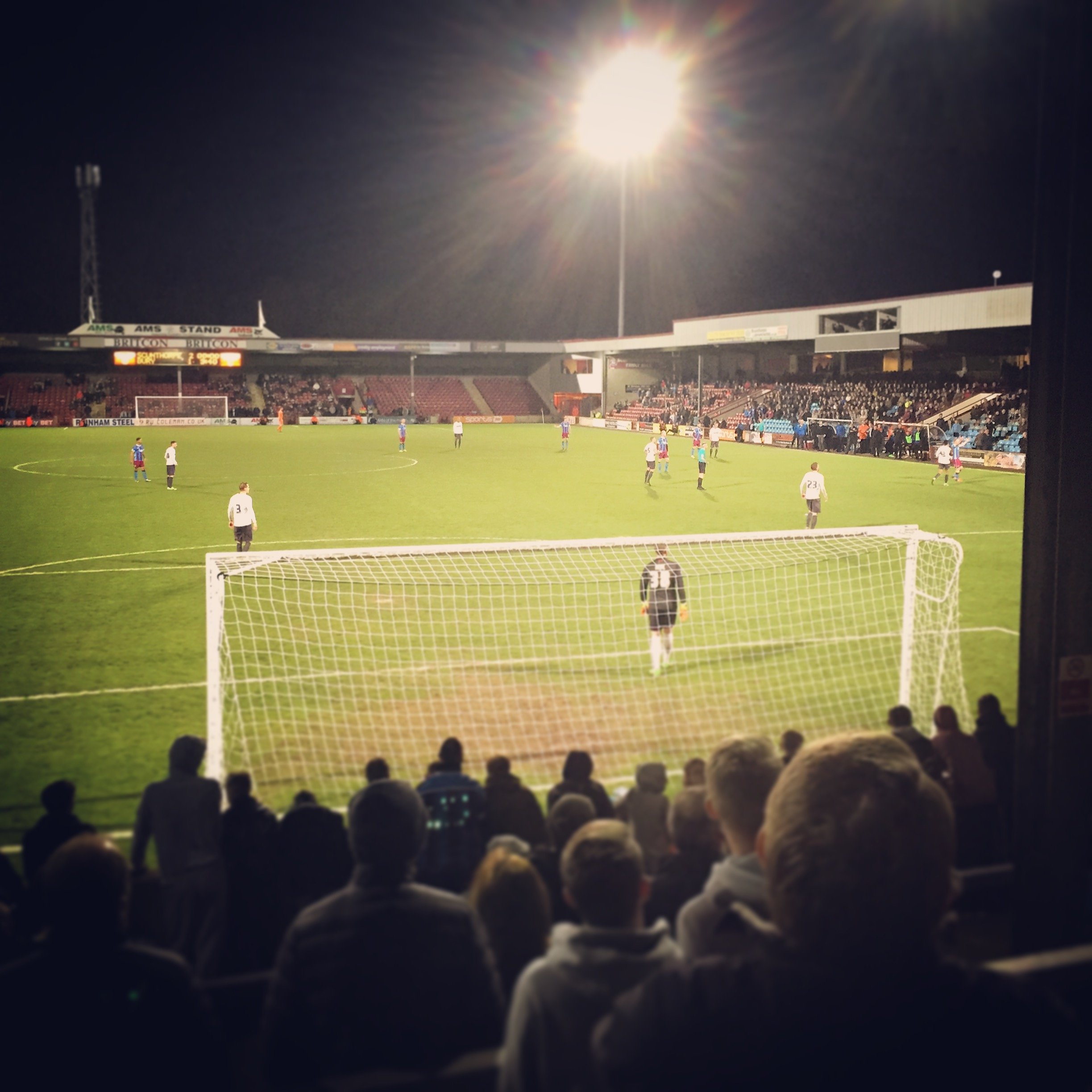
Glanford Park as seen from the Britcon stand

In 1988 Scunthorpe United moved to a new, purpose-built stadium, Glanford Park. While preparations for the new ground were under way, the club qualified for the Division Four play-offs under Mick Buxton in their final season at the Old Show Ground. However, the club lost 3–2 on aggregate to Torquay United in the semi-final. The second leg of this semi-final was the last game played at the Old Show Ground, with Steve Lister being the last player to score at the ground.

The club's first season at Glanford Park ended in another play-off semi-final defeat, 5–1 on aggregate to Wrexham. In 1991 the Iron lost to 3–2 on aggregate to Blackpool in another play-off semi-final under Buxton's replacement, Bill Green. In 1992, the club qualified for the Fourth Division play-off final at Wembley Stadium, but lost 4–3 to Blackpool in a penalty shootout. This was the club's first appearance at Wembley.

The following four seasons saw United sit consistently in the middle of the now Third Division table under a succession of managers, namely Richard Money and David Moore. Mick Buxton made a return to the club as manager following Moore's sacking in 1996.

=== 1997–2010: The Brian Laws and Nigel Adkins era ===
In February 1997, Brian Laws was appointed manager. In 1997–98, his first full season in charge, the club finished one point outside the play-offs. The following season, the club finished fourth in Division Three, qualifying for the play-offs, which they won following a 3–2 aggregate win in the semi-finals over Swansea City and a 1–0 win over Leyton Orient in the final at Wembley. They were unable to maintain their Division Two status the following season, finishing in 23rd place.

Laws guided the Iron to their second play-off finish during the 2002–03 season, with the club finishing in 5th place. However, Scunthorpe were ultimately denied promotion by their county rivals Lincoln City, losing the semi-finals 6–3 on aggregate. On 25 March 2004, Laws was sacked as Scunthorpe United manager after a poor run of results saw the Iron sitting just 6 points above relegation in Division Three. However, three weeks later, it was announced that Laws had been reinstated as manager after a boardroom shake-up. The club finished the season four points ahead of the relegation zone in 22nd place.

Laws remained with the Iron for the following season, which Scunthorpe started in the newly rebranded Football League Two. The Iron gained promotion to Football League One as runners up. In the FA Cup, Scunthorpe visited Chelsea but lost 3–1 despite briefly going ahead in the match. In the 2005–06 season, the club secured a mid-table League One finish. After a successful start to the 2006–07 season, Laws was offered the job of manager at Sheffield Wednesday, which he accepted, ending almost a decade in charge of the Iron.

Following Laws' departure, physiotherapist Nigel Adkins was put in temporary charge. After obtaining good results, his role was made permanent. Under Adkins, the club went on to win League One and promotion to the Championship, in the process setting a club record 16-match unbeaten run and accumulating 91 points. In the following league campaign, Scunthorpe were unable to cement their place in the second tier, and were relegated in 23rd place.

The 2008–09 season saw Scunthorpe reach Wembley twice. The Iron qualified for the Football League Trophy final, but were beaten 3–2 after extra time by Luton Town. The club then qualified for the League One play-offs, and defeated MK Dons on penalties in the semi-finals before beating Millwall in the final 3–2 to achieve promotion back to the Championship. In 2009–10, the Iron managed to retain their second-tier status for the first time since 1963. Seven games into the 2010–11 season, Nigel Adkins left Scunthorpe to join Southampton as manager. After managerial spells from Ian Baraclough and Alan Knill, Scunthorpe were ultimately relegated in bottom position.

=== 2011–2022: The final Football League years ===
Scunthorpe finished the 2011–12 season in 18th place on 52 points. With the Iron struggling in the following season, Brian Laws returned to the club as manager, but was unable to stop the club's relegation back into League Two on the last day of the following season. At the end of the 2012–13 season, the then chairman Steve Wharton stepped down from his position with immediate effect. Businessman Peter Swann was appointed as his successor on 24 May 2013.

Laws was sacked in November 2013 and was replaced by Russ Wilcox, who oversaw a 28-game unbeaten run that broke the all-time football league record. The unbeaten run ended with a defeat at Exeter City, on the same day Scunthorpe achieved automatic promotion back to League One. However, Wilcox could not sustain momentum into the following season and was sacked in October 2014. The club finished 16th in League One.

After narrowly missing out on the play-offs on goal difference in the 2015–16 campaign, the Iron finished in third in 2017, having never been outside the top six during the season. In the play-off semi-final, Scunthorpe lost 3–2 to Millwall. In the 2017–18 season, Scunthorpe finished in 5th place but lost 4–2 on aggregate against Rotherham United in the play-off semi-finals. In 2017, the club appointed former international cricketer and Scunthorpe player Sir Ian Botham as president, replacing John Godfrey.

Scunthorpe were relegated at the end of the 2018–19 season in 23rd position. Due to the impact of COVID-19, the 2019–20 season was terminated early and decided on a points per game basis, placing Scunthorpe 20th. In 2020–21, the majority of fixtures were played behind closed doors; Scunthorpe finished 22nd, after not winning any of their final ten fixtures, avoiding relegation by three points.

On 31 March 2022, with the Iron bottom of League Two and 10 points from safety, chairman Peter Swann announced his resignation with immediate effect. On 15 April 2022, Scunthorpe lost 3–0 at Leyton Orient and were relegated from League Two, ending a 72-year spell in the Football League. The club's final league game was a 7–0 hammering away at Bristol Rovers, leaving the Iron bottom of the table with just 26 points.

=== 2022–present: non-League football ===
On 14 September 2022, the club was reported to be "in genuine danger of entering administration" after a proposed takeover deal collapsed. In January 2023, with a takeover yet to be completed and the club at the bottom of the National League, the club were served with a winding-up petition over an unpaid tax bill. On 25 January 2023, the club announced the immediate takeover of the club by former Ilkeston Town chairman David Hilton.

Hilton settled the club's HMRC tax debt, spelling the end of a transfer embargo but ownership of the ground continued to be disputed. To cut costs, the club's academy was closed and some staff redundancies went ahead. At the end of the 2022–23 season, the club suffered a second successive relegation to the National League North.

In September 2023, Hilton put the club up for sale. On 28 September 2023, after details emerged of his previous criminal offences, a damning expose article in The Athletic online sport magazine, plus subsequent disagreements with various fans groups and individuals on social media, Hilton withdrew the club's funding. Liquidation seemed likely, but an online initiative by longstanding fans website Iron Bru raised over £70,000 which was then used to pay some of the wages of staff, players and management (unpaid under Hilton for two months). On 4 October 2023, the club was sold to local businesswoman Michelle Harness and a new board of directors was formed. The club finished their first season in the sixth tier as runners-up but lost on penalties in the play-off semi-final to Boston United. A year later, at the end of the 2024–25 season, the club earned promotion back to the National League at the second time of asking, defeating Chester 2–1 in the play-off final having finished second in the regular season.

== Stadiums ==
=== The Old Show Ground ===
The Old Show Ground was club's original home from 1899 to 1988. The site, in the centre of Scunthorpe, hosted events including the annual Scunthorpe show as far back as 1867. The site was also initially known simply as 'The Showground', but it is unclear when the prefix 'Old' was added.

The Old Show Ground needed significant investment to maintain its fabric and ensure compliance with new regulations introduced in the wake of the Bradford City stadium fire. In 1987, with the club hampered by financial difficulties, it announced plans to relocate. The ground was sold to the former supermarket chain Safeway (and later to Sainsbury's) and the search was started for a new location. In 1988 Scunthorpe United became the first English football club in the modern era to move to a new, purpose-built stadium, Glanford Park.

The site of the former ground is now home to a Sainsbury's store, at the junction of Doncaster Road and Henderson Avenue. When the store was opened a plaque (since removed) marked the location of the centre-spot, just in front of the delicatessen counter. A carved stone commemorating the site's previous use was incorporated into the exterior wall of a 2011 extension, beside the cashpoints.

=== Glanford Park ===
Land was secured at an out of town site in what was then the administrative area of Glanford meaning that the new ground was outside the boundaries of Scunthorpe (although this changed with the re-organisation of local government in 1996 as both Scunthorpe Borough Council and Glanford Borough Council merged to become North Lincolnshire Council).

At this time there were no grants available and the development had to be funded with the cash from the sale of the Old Show Ground, sponsorship, directors' loans and bank loans. This lack of outsider cash means that Glanford Park was built in a rather simplistic, box-like style, with a capacity of 9,088—significantly smaller than the Old Show Ground. The ground was so named because it was sponsored by Glanford Borough Council. The ground has been officially known as the Attis Arena since 6 January 2024, when the naming rights were purchased by Leeds-based company Attis Insurance Brokers.

==== Glanford Park property dispute ====
In May 2021, the then Scunthorpe United owner, Peter Swann revealed to fans that he had transferred Glanford Park, the training ground, car park and surrounding land to his other business Coolsilk Property and Investment Ltd, in exchange for £11 million worth of loans. At the same time, Swann told the fans they could expect stadium improvements and that the club would have a 99-year lease so they couldn't be evicted. In January 2023, David Hilton had completed a takeover of Scunthorpe and announced the deal included the stadium and surrounding land. The deal provided a four-month exclusivity period for Hilton to conclude a £3m agreement to buy the property.

However, Hilton's legal team raised concerns about the valuation, the stadium's status as a community asset and issues of planning permission and access. Hilton did not buy the stadium within the agreed timeframe; instead he found a loophole solution: a lease agreement that let the club stay at Glanford Park for 7p a week rent - something Swann considered to be trespass and squatting. Hilton claimed that Swann was demanding an unreasonable £1.5 million upfront before starting legal paperwork for the sale. Swann, through a fan message board, claimed Hilton was lying about the whole thing and didn't want to buy the stadium at all. In late May 2023, the gates at Glanford Park were bolted shut and a sign explained the club were legally allowed to 'squat' at Glanford Park.

Swann began legal proceedings to sue both Hilton and the club, with an initial court hearing being adjourned until between January 2024 and March 2024. However, in September 2023, the club said that fixtures after 7 October 2023 would be played at Gainsborough Trinity due to the dispute. However, the club continued to play at Glanford Park in late October as negotiations over the ground's ownership continued. On 16 November 2023, the club exchanged contracts with Swann to buy back Glanford Park. Tahina Akther, a local born barrister, crafted a deal that enabled The New Show Ground Community Interest Company, a not for profit entity, to purchase the stadium alongside the local council purchasing the surrounding training fields and car parks for development. The purchase was completed on 29 November.

== Club identity ==
The club's nickname, The Iron, marks the town's association with the iron and steel industry. The club was also nicknamed The Nuts in the early 20th century.

The club's first choice playing colours are claret and blue.

Period	Kit Sponsor	Shirt Sponsor
1975–76	Admiral	No shirt sponsor
1976–79	Bukta	No shirt sponsor
1979–82	Adidas	No shirt sponsor
1982–83	Hobott	No shirt sponsor
1983–85	Umbro	Scunthorpe E.Z.
1985–87	Hobott	No shirt sponsor
1987–89	Hobott	Brikenden
1989–90	Scoreline	Brikenden
1990–92	Ribero	Brikenden
1992–94	Alan Ward Sports	Brikenden
1994–96	Alan Ward Sports	Pleasure Island
1996–98	Mizuno	Pleasure Island
1998–2000	Mizuno	Motek
2000–01	Super League	Motek
2001–04	TFG Sports	HL Mercedes-Benz
2004–05	Carlotti	HL Mercedes-Benz
2005–07	Carlotti	Hatfields Jeep
2007–10	Carlotti	Rainham Steel
2010–15	Nike	Rainham Steel
2015–16	Avec	Prostate Cancer UK
2016–17	Carbrini Sportswear	British Steel
2017–18	FBT	British Steel
2018–19	FBT	Rainham Steel
2019–20	FBT	Utilita
2020–21	Macron	Utilita
2021–22	Macron	Cancer Research UK
2022–23	Macron	Marshall BMW
2023–24	Kelme	HITEK Electronic Materials Limited
2024-25	Kelme	HITEK Electronic Materials Limited
2025-26	Meyba	HITEK Electronic Materials Limited
2026-27	Meyba	British Steel

=== Mascots ===
Scunthorpe United's official team mascots are 'Scunny Bunny' who has the number 99 and 'Honey Bunny' who has the number 66. They both wear the same kit as the outfield players do.

== Rivalries ==
Club	Last match	Season
Boston United	L 3-6	2025-26
Doncaster Rovers	L 2–3	2018–19
Gainsborough Trinity	L 0–1	1930–31
Grimsby Town	W 3–0	2020–21
Hull City	L 1–5	2010–11
Lincoln City	D 1–1	2020–21
York City	L 0-3	2025-26

Scunthorpe are considered to be a part of two main derbies: the Humber derby and the Lincolnshire derby. The Humber derby is contested between Scunthorpe, Hull City and Grimsby Town. The three clubs are all situated on the banks of the River Humber, hence the name given to the derby. The Lincolnshire derby is contested between a number of clubs throughout the county of Lincolnshire, including Scunthorpe, Lincoln City, Boston United, Gainsborough Trinity and Grimsby. Scunthorpe have not played Gainsborough competitively since an FA Cup game in 1930, though the two often play pre-season friendlies.

Doncaster Rovers are also considered a rival, as they are the nearest club, geographically, to Glanford Park. Despite this, Grimsby are traditionally viewed as Scunthorpe's fiercest rivals. Fans also consider York City a rivalry, though the two teams rarely play each other, only six times in the last 20 years. During Scunthorpe's rise to the second and third tiers of English football, rivalries with Barnsley, Sheffield United and Sheffield Wednesday emerged, although none of these clubs saw Scunthorpe as a rival.

== Players ==
=== First-team squad ===
As of 31 October 2026

Note: Flags indicate national team as defined under FIFA eligibility rules; some limited exceptions apply. Players may hold more than one non-FIFA nationality.

No.	Pos.	Nation	Player
1	GK	ENG	Louis Jones
2	DF	ENG	Oli Rose
3	DF	ENG	Branden Horton
4	DF	CIV	Jéan Belehouan
5	DF	ENG	Will Evans
6	DF	ENG	Callum Howe
7	FW	ENG	Dec Howe
8	FW	ENG	Alfie Beestin
9	FW	ENG	James Norwood
10	FW	ENG	Luke Brennan
11	MF	ENG	Joe Rowley
12	FW	IRL	Hugh Parker (on loan from Hull City)
14	FW	WAL	Pat Jones
15	DF	ENG	Stan Ashbee (on loan from Hull City)

No.	Pos.	Nation	Player
16	FW	ENG	Tyrell Sellars-Fleming (on loan from Hull City)
17	MF	ENG	Dan Batty
18	FW	ENG	Kyle Hurst
19	MF	ENG	Jordan Richards
21	DF	ENG	Joe Starbuck
22	DF	AUS	Reagan Ogle
23	MF	ENG	Jacob Butterfield
24	DF	ENG	Harry Shipstone
25	GK	ENG	Maison Campbell
30	DF	ENG	Regan Clayton (on loan from West Ham United)
31	FW	ENG	James Gale
33	DF	ENG	Tyler Denton
44	DF	ENG	Ross Barrows

=== Notable former players ===
==== Full international players while at Scunthorpe ====
Grant McCann played 12 matches for Northern Ireland during his time at Scunthorpe, a club record. McCann scored three goals at international level – a tally also reached by New Zealander David Mulligan. George Thomas was the most recent Scunthorpe player to make a full international appearance, for Wales against Trinidad and Tobago on 20 March 2019, during a season-long loan spell from Leicester City.

Player		Country	Caps	Goals	Year(s) of caps	Notes
Grant McCann	(Northern Ireland)	Northern Ireland	12	3	2008–2010	
David Mulligan	(New Zealand)	New Zealand	4	3	2007	
Michael O'Connor	(Northern Ireland)	Northern Ireland	4	0	2009–2010	
Clayton Lewis	(New Zealand)	New Zealand	4	0	2017–2018	
Jason Batty	(New Zealand)	New Zealand	3	0	2001	
Scott Wiseman	(Gibraltar)	Gibraltar	3	0	2016	
Lyle Taylor	(Montserrat)	Montserrat	2	1	2015	^{a}
Jonathan Forte	(Barbados)	Barbados	2	0	2007	
Martin Paterson	(Northern Ireland)	Northern Ireland	2	0	2007–2008	
George Thomas	(Wales)	Wales	2	0	2018–2019	^{a}
Andrew Crofts	(Wales)	Wales	1	0	2017	
Joe Murphy	(Republic of Ireland)	Republic of Ireland	1	0	2010	
Oliver Norwood	(Northern Ireland)	Northern Ireland	1	0	2011	^{a}
Clint Marcelle	(Trinidad and Tobago)	Trinidad & Tobago	1	0	1999	^{a}
Ramón Núñez	(Honduras)	Honduras	1	0	2011	^{a}

^{a} Capped while on loan to Scunthorpe United.

==== Other notable former players ====
In the early 1990s Perry Cotton played 10 internationals for New Zealand, scoring 1 goal. Other notable players with full international caps after or before their times at Scunthorpe include (in alphabetical order):

- Graham Alexander – Burnley and Scotland
- Jermaine Beckford – Everton, Leicester City and Jamaica
- Jack Bowers – England, ex-Derby County and Leicester City, began his professional career in 1927 at Scunthorpe & Lindsey United club.
- Ray Clemence – goalkeeper who played for Liverpool, Tottenham Hotspur and England.
- Jack Cork – Burnley, England and Great Britain in the Olympics
- Matt Elliott – Leicester City and Scotland
- Duane Holmes – currently at Huddersfield Town, having played for USA
- Ken Jones – goalkeeper in the Welsh squad at the 1958 FIFA World Cup in Sweden
- Kevin Keegan – twice European Footballer of the Year, played for Liverpool and England, with subsequent managerial career including England and Newcastle United.
- Andy Keogh – Wolves and Republic of Ireland
- Ian Storey-Moore (Youth team) – Nottingham Forest, Manchester United and England

England cricket all-rounder and national Test team captain Ian Botham played as a centre-half and made eleven appearances in the Football League for Scunthorpe. Botham was also the president of Scunthorpe from 2017 to 2023.

== Team management ==
Position	Name
Interim Manager :	(England) Jacob Butterfield
Interim Manager:	(England) Ross Barrows
Goalkeeping Coach:	(England) Paul Musselwhite
Strength and Conditioning Coach:	(England) Ash Slawson
Lead Physiotherapist:	(England) Rosie Margetson
Physiotherapist:	(England) Rodger Wylde
Kit Manager:	(England) Sharon Stephenson

== Records and statistics ==
Attendance records

- Record attendance (Old Show Ground)
  - 23,935 vs. Portsmouth, FA Cup fourth round, 30 January 1954
- Record attendance (Glanford Park)
  - 9,086 vs Chester, 18 May 2025

Position records

- Highest position
  - 4th in Second Division, 1961–62
- Lowest position
  - 2nd in National League North, 2023–24, 2024–25

Record results

- Record victory
  - 8–1 vs. Luton Town, Third Division, 24 April 1965
  - 8–1 vs. Torquay United, Third Division, 28 October 1995
- Record defeat
  - 8–0 vs. Carlisle United, Third Division North, 25 December 1952

Transfer records

- Highest fees paid
  - Rob Jones – £700,000 from Hibernian
  - Martin Paterson – £335,000 from Stoke City
  - Paddy Madden – £300,000 from Yeovil Town
  - Kevan Hurst – £200,000 from Sheffield United
  - Jonathan Forte – £200,000 from Sheffield United
  - David Mirfin – £150,000 from Huddersfield Town
- Highest fees received
  - Billy Sharp – £2.5 million to Sheffield United
  - Gary Hooper – £2.4 million to Celtic
  - Martin Paterson – £1.6 million to Burnley
  - Conor Townsend – £756,000 to West Brom
  - Andy Keogh – £750,000 to Wolverhampton Wanderers

== Honours ==
League

- Third Division North / League One (level 3)
  - Champions: 1957–58, 2006–07
  - Play-off winners: 2009
- Fourth Division / Third Division / League Two (level 4)
  - Runners-up: 2004–05, 2013–14
  - Promoted: 1971–72, 1982–83
  - Play-off winners: 1999
- National League North (level 6)
  - Play-off winners: 2025
- Midland League
  - Champions: 1926–27, 1938–39

Cup

- Football League Trophy
  - Runners-up: 2008–09
- Lincolnshire Senior Cup
  - Winners (23): 1938–39, 1939–40, 1951–52, 1953–54, 1954–55, 1955–56, 1957–58, 1958–59, 1960–61, 1963–64, 1965–66, 1977–78, 1996–97, 1998–99, 2001–02, 2003–04, 2007–08, 2008–09, 2009–10, 2010–11, 2021–22, 2023–24, 2024–25
