= 2019–20 Accrington Stanley F.C. season =

Accrington Stanley F.C.
2019–20 season
- Chairman: Andy Holt
- Manager: John Coleman
- Stadium: Crown Ground
- League One: 17th
- FA Cup: First round
- EFL Cup: First round
- EFL Trophy: Quarter-finals
- Highest home attendance: League/All: 4,164 (14 September vs. Sunderland)
- Lowest home attendance: League: 2,102 (26 October vs. Gillingham); All: 923 (3 September vs. Fleetwood Town, EFL Trophy)
- Average home league attendance: 2,997
- Biggest win: 3–0 (8 October at Oldham Athletic, EFL Trophy)
- Biggest defeat: 0–4 (23 October at Peterborough United)
Home colours	Away colours	Third colours

The 2019–20 season was Accrington Stanley's second season in League One and their 51st year in existence. Along with competing in League One, the club also participated in the FA Cup, EFL Cup, and EFL Trophy. The season covers the period from 1 July 2019 to 30 June 2020.

== Transfers ==
=== Transfers in ===
Date	Position	Nationality	Name	From	Fee	Ref.
1 July 2019	CM	ENG	Joe Pritchard	(England) Bolton Wanderers	Free transfer	
13 July 2019	CF	ENG	Colby Bishop	(England) Leamington	Undisclosed	
13 July 2019	LB	ATG	Zaine Francis-Angol	(England) AFC Fylde	Free transfer	
15 July 2019	LB	ENG	Joe Maguire	(England) Fleetwood Town	Free transfer	
15 July 2019	CM	GUI	Lamine Kaba Sherif	(England) Leicester City	Free transfer	
16 July 2019	CB	ENG	Ben Barclay	(England) Brighton & Hove Albion	Free transfer	
23 July 2019	WG	POR	Wilson Carvalho	(England) Stratford Town	Free transfer	
1 August 2019	RB	ENG	Phil Edwards	(England) Bury	Free transfer	
12 August 2019	CF	NIR	Dion Charles	(England) Southport	Undisclosed	

=== Loans in ===
Date	Position	Nationality	Name	From	Date until	Ref.
2 August 2019	GK	ENG	Josef Buršík	(England) Stoke City	30 June 2020	
9 August 2019	CF	ENG	Courtney Baker-Richardson	(Wales) Swansea City	30 June 2020	
2 September 2019	CB	ENG	Aji Alese	(England) West Ham United	30 June 2020	
2 September 2019	CB	ENG	Jerome Opoku	(England) Fulham	30 June 2020	
2 September 2019	CF	ENG	Connor Simpson	(England) Preston North End	30 June 2020	
6 September 2019	DM	ENG	Sadou Diallo	(England) Wolverhampton Wanderers	30 June 2020	
31 January 2020	CF	ENG	Benny Ashley-Seal	(England) Wolverhampton Wanderers	30 June 2020	
31 January 2020	CM	ENG	Bobby Grant	(Wales) Wrexham	30 June 2020	

=== Loans out ===
Date from	Position	Nationality	Name	To	Date until	Ref.
16 July 2019	CB	ENG	Zehn Mohammed	(England) Southport	January 2020	
20 July 2019	CB	AUS	Reagan Ogle	(England) Southport	January 2020	
22 July 2019	CM	ENG	Niall Watson	(Republic of Ireland) Sligo Rovers	31 December 2019	
8 November 2019	FW	ENG	Alex O'Neill	(England) Skelmersdale United	21 November 2019	
22 November 2019	FW	ENG	Alex O'Neill	(England) Runcorn Linnets	December 2019	
2 December 2019	MF	ENG	Lewis Doyle	(England) Curzon Ashton	January 2020	
7 December 2019	MF	ENG	Lewis Gilboy	(England) City of Liverpool	January 2020	
20 December 2019	CM	NIR	Andrew Scott	(England) Curzon Ashton	January 2020	
30 December 2019	GK	ENG	Toby Savin	(England) Stalybridge Celtic	January 2020	

=== Transfers out ===
Date	Position	Nationality	Name	To	Fee	Ref.
1 July 2019	DM	ENG	Scott Brown	(England) Harrogate Town	Free transfer	
1 July 2019	GK	ENG	Jonny Maxted	(England) Exeter City	Free transfer	
1 July 2019	RM	ENG	Piero Mingoia	(England) Boreham Wood	Mutual consent	
1 July 2019	DM	NIR	Liam Nolan	(England) FC Halifax Town	Released	
1 July 2019	CB	ENG	Ben Richards-Everton	(England) Bradford City	Free transfer	
1 July 2019	LM	ENG	Danny Williams	(England) FC Halifax Town	Released	
1 July 2019	CB	ENG	Will Wood	(England) Dagenham & Redbridge	Released	
13 December 2019	RW	ENG	Okera Simmonds	Free agent	Mutual consent	
29 January 2020	FW	NIR	Billy Kee	Retired	—N/a	

== Pre-season ==
Stanley have announced pre-season friendlies against Sligo Rovers, Marseille, Bala Town, Warrington Town and Morecambe.

Win Draw Loss

8 July 2019 Friendly	Sligo Rovers	1–0	Accrington Stanley	Sligo, Ireland
19:45 BST	Parkes 49'			Stadium: The Showgrounds

11 July 2019 Friendly	Accrington Stanley	2–1	(France) Marseille	Barton-upon-Irwell
18:00 BST	McConville 28'; Zanzala 37' (pen.)	Report	Thauvin 77'	Stadium: AJ Bell Stadium; Referee: Oliver Langford

20 July 2019 Friendly	Bala Town	1–0	Accrington Stanley	Bala
15:00 BST	Hayes 16'	Report		Stadium: Maes Tegid

22 July 2019 Friendly	Warrington Town	0–0	Accrington Stanley	Warrington
19:30 BST		Report		Stadium: Cantilever Park

23 July 2019 Friendly	Preston North End	1–1	Accrington Stanley	Leyland
19:45 BST	Bauer 39'	Report	Bishop 45'	Stadium: County Ground

27 July 2019 Friendly	Morecambe	0–2	Accrington Stanley	Leyland
15:00 BST		Report	Bishop 57'; McConville 64'	Stadium: County Ground

== Competitions ==
=== League One ===
==== League table ====
Pos	Team	Pld	W	D	L	GF	GA	GD	Pts	PPG	Promotion, qualification or relegation
13	Blackpool	35	11	12	12	44	43	+1	45	1.29	
14	Bristol Rovers	35	12	9	14	38	49	−11	45	1.29	
15	Shrewsbury Town	34	10	11	13	31	42	−11	41	1.21	
16	Lincoln City	35	12	6	17	44	46	−2	42	1.20	
17	Accrington Stanley	35	10	10	15	47	53	−6	40	1.14	
18	Rochdale	34	10	6	18	39	57	−18	36	1.06	
19	Milton Keynes Dons	35	10	7	18	36	47	−11	37	1.06	
20	AFC Wimbledon	35	8	11	16	39	52	−13	35	1.00	
21	Tranmere Rovers (R)	34	8	8	18	36	60	−24	32	0.94	Relegation to EFL League Two

Source: EFL Official Website
Rules for classification: 1) Points per game; 2) Goal difference; 3) Number of goals scored; 4) Head-to-head results; 5) Wins; 6) Away goals; 7) Penalty points (sec 9.5); 8) 12-point sending-off offences
(R) Relegated

==== Result summary ====
Overall								Home						Away					
Pld	W	D	L	GF	GA	GD	Pts	W	D	L	GF	GA	GD	W	D	L	GF	GA	GD
35	10	10	15	47	53	−6	40	7	2	8	33	27	+6	3	8	7	14	26	−12

Last updated: 7 March 2020.
Source: Statto.com

==== Results by matchday ====
Matchday	1	2	3	4	5	6	7	8	9	10	11	12	13	14	15	16	17	18	19	20	21	22	23	24	25	26	27	28	29	30	31	32	33	34	35
Ground	A	A	H	A	H	A	H	A	H	A	H	A	H	A	H	A	A	H	A	H	A	A	H	H	A	H	A	H	H	A	H	H	A	A	H
Result	L	D	L	L	W	D	L	D	D	W	D	L	W	L	L	D	L	W	D	W	D	W	W	L	L	L	D	L	W	W	W	L	L	D	L
Position	21	19	21	21	20	19	20	20	19	17	18	20	17	18	18	19	19	17	18	17	17	16	15	17	17	17	17	17	17	16	14	14	16	16	17

Updated to match(es) played on 7 March 2020. Source: Statto.com
A = Away; H = Home; W = Win; D = Draw; L = Loss

==== Matches ====
On Thursday, 20 June 2019, the EFL League One fixtures were revealed.

Win Draw Loss Postponed

===== August =====
3 August 2019 1	Lincoln City	2–0	Accrington Stanley	Lincoln
15:00 BST	Toffolo (yellow card) 21'; O'Connor 35'; Akinde 81' (pen.); Morrell (yellow card) 84'	Report	Sherif (yellow card) 87'	Stadium: Sincil Bank; Attendance: 8,668; Referee: Tony Harrington

17 August 2019 2	AFC Wimbledon	1–1	Accrington Stanley	Norbiton
15:00 BST	O'Neill 42'; Wagstaff (yellow card) 56'	Report	Francis-Angol (yellow card) 55' (yellow-red card) 61'; Hughes (yellow card) 56'; Bishop 64'	Stadium: Cherry Red Records Stadium; Attendance: 3,979; Referee: John Busby

20 August 2019 3	Accrington Stanley	2–3	Shrewsbury Town	Accrington
19:45 BST	Maguire (yellow card) 25'; Clark (yellow card) 52'; Bishop 67' (pen.); Charles 72'	Report	Hughes 77' (o.g.); Okenabirhie 85'; Udoh 89'	Stadium: Crown Ground; Attendance: 2,284; Referee: Scott Oldham

24 August 2019 4	Fleetwood Town	2–0	Accrington Stanley	Fleetwood
15:00 BST	Madden 28'; Evans 71' (pen.) (yellow card) 75'; Burns (yellow card) 75'; Andrew (yellow card) 90+4'	Report	McConville (red card) 74'	Stadium: Highbury Stadium; Attendance: 2,802; Referee: Peter Wright

31 August 2019 5	Accrington Stanley	2–1	Milton Keynes Dons	Accrington
15:00 BST	Bishop 52' (penalty missed) 64'; Hughes 59'; Johnson (yellow card) 71'; Carvalho (yellow card) 81'; Finley (yellow card) 90+3'; Sykes (yellow card) 90+8'	Report	Gilbey (yellow card) 8'; Agard 18'; Healey (yellow card) 45'; Lewington (yellow card) 77'; Nombe (yellow card) 80'	Stadium: Crown Ground; Attendance: 2,218; Referee: Ross Joyce

===== September =====
7 September 2019 6	Bristol Rovers	3–3	Accrington Stanley	Horfield
15:00 BST	Rodman 4'; Clarke-Harris 41', 63' (yellow card) 73'; Clarke (yellow card) 52'	Report	Conneely (yellow card) 10' (yellow-red card) 49'; Clark 18'; Finley 20'; Charles 77' (pen.)	Stadium: Memorial Stadium; Attendance: 6,524; Referee: Neil Hair

14 September 2019 7	Accrington Stanley	1–3	Sunderland	Accrington
15:00 BST	Clark 5'; Alese (yellow card) 83'	Report	Gooch 7'; Leadbitter (yellow card) 24'; McGeady 26'; McNulty 36'	Stadium: Wham Stadium; Attendance: 4,164; Referee: Lee Swabey

17 September 2019 8	Wycombe Wanderers	1–1	Accrington Stanley	High Wycombe
19:45 BST	Wheeler (yellow card) 65'; Freeman 72' (pen.); Bloomfield (yellow card) 81'; Akinfenwa (yellow card) 90+3'	Report	Charles 40'; Hughes (yellow card) 48'; Opoku (yellow card) 51'; Clark (yellow card) 71'	Stadium: Adams Park; Attendance: 3,566; Referee: Brett Huxtable

21 September 2019 9	Accrington Stanley	1–1	Blackpool	Accrington
15:00 BST	Tilt 16' (o.g.); Opoku (yellow card) 21'; Finley (yellow card) 63'; Sykes (yellow card) 80'	Report	Turton (yellow card) 74'; Virtue 90+2'; Nuttall (yellow card) 90+6'	Stadium: Wham Stadium; Attendance: 4,054; Referee: John Brooks

28 September 2019 10	Southend United	0–1	Accrington Stanley	Southend-on-Sea
15:00 BST	Ralph (yellow card) 22' (yellow-red card) 73'	Report	Johnson (yellow card) 24'; Bishop 52'; Conneely (yellow card) 83'	Stadium: Roots Hall; Attendance: 5,643; Referee: Charles Breakspear

===== October =====
5 October 2019 11	Accrington Stanley	2–2	Oxford United	Accrington
15:00 BST	Finley (yellow card) 31'; Johnson (yellow card) 44'; Opoku (yellow card) 45+4'; Clark 59' (yellow card) 64'; Zanzala 73'; Conneely (yellow card) 90+3'	Report	Fosu 28'; Henry (yellow card) 45+4'; Mackie (yellow card) 45+5'; Brannagan 70' (yellow card) 79'; Taylor (yellow card) 89'	Stadium: Wham Stadium; Attendance: 2,590; Referee: Martin Coy

12 October 2019 12	Rochdale	2–1	Accrington Stanley	Spotland
15:00 BST	Henderson 40', 49'	Report	Pritchard 53'; Sykes (yellow card) 64'; Opoku (yellow card) 84'	Stadium: Crown Oil Arena; Attendance: 3,508; Referee: Tom Nield

20 October 2019 13	Accrington Stanley	2–0	Ipswich Town	Accrington
12:00 BST	Bishop 17', 41' (pen.); Opoku (yellow card) 49'; McConville (yellow card) 74'; Sykes (red card) 78'	Report	Nsiala (yellow card) 19'; Edwards (yellow card) 45'; Nolan (yellow card) 59'; Dobra (yellow card) 72' (red card) 79'	Stadium: Wham Stadium; Attendance: 3,567; Referee: Sebastian Stockbridge

23 October 2019 14	Peterborough United	4–0	Accrington Stanley	Peterborough
19:45 BST	Maddison 56'; Toney 69' (yellow card) 78'; Kent 85'; Dembélé 90+5'	Report	McConville (yellow card) 45+4'; Johnson (yellow card) 67'	Stadium: West Homes Stadium; Attendance: 5,843

26 October 2019 15	Accrington Stanley	0–1	Gillingham	Accrington
12:00 BST	McConville (yellow card) 24'; Clark (yellow card) 90+4'	Report	Charles-Cook 59'; Jones (yellow card) 85'	Stadium: Wham Stadium; Attendance: 2,102; Referee: John Busby

===== November =====
2 November 2019 16	Coventry City	0–0	Accrington Stanley	Bordesley
15:00 GMT	O'Hare (yellow card) 53'; Biamou (red card) 68'; McFadzean (yellow card) 80'	Report		Stadium: St Andrew's Trillion Trophy Stadium; Attendance: 5,455; Referee: Oliver Yates

16 November 2019 17	Rotherham United	1–0	Accrington Stanley	Rotherham
15:00 GMT	Ihiekwe (yellow card) 25'; Morris 30'; Robertson (yellow card) 37'; Ogbene (yellow card) 61' (yellow-red card) 82'; Jones (yellow card) 70'	Report	Johnson (yellow card) 23'; Evtimov (yellow card) 35'; Conneely (yellow card) 50'	Stadium: AESSEAL New York Stadium; Attendance: 8,430; Referee: Darren Handley

23 November 2019 18	Accrington Stanley	7–1	Bolton Wanderers	Accrington
15:00 GMT	Bishop 15' (pen.), 27'; McConville 33', 53'; Conneely (yellow card) 45+3'; Charles 75'; Zanzala 80', 90+1'	Report	Murphy 5'; Earl (red card) 14'; O'Grady (yellow card) 29'	Stadium: Wham Stadium; Attendance: 5,034; Referee: Anthony Backhouse

===== December =====
7 December 2019 19	Tranmere Rovers	1–1	Accrington Stanley	Birkenhead
15:00 GMT	Morris 38'	Report	McConville 18'; Rodgers (yellow card) 35'	Stadium: Prenton Park; Attendance: 5,751; Referee: Tony Harrington

14 December 2019 20	Accrington Stanley	4–1	Portsmouth	Accrington
15:00 GMT	Harrison 44' (o.g.); Charles 62'; Bishop 69', 77'; Finley (yellow card) 89'	Report	Curtis 35'; McCrorie (yellow card) 78'	Stadium: Wham Stadium; Attendance: 2,429; Referee: Martin Coy

21 December 2019 21	Doncaster Rovers	1–1	Accrington Stanley	Doncaster
15:00 GMT	Taylor 57'; Gomes (yellow card) 69'	Report	Zanzala 82'	Stadium: Keepmoat Stadium; Attendance: 7,444; Referee: Andy Haines

26 December 2019 22	Blackpool	0–1	Accrington Stanley	Blackpool
15:00 GMT	Thompson (yellow card) 13'; Spearing (yellow card) 80'	Report	Finley (yellow card) 13'; Barclay (yellow card) 50'; McConville 90+1' (yellow card) 90+2'	Stadium: Bloomfield Road; Attendance: 9,517; Referee: Michael Salisbury

29 December 2019 23	Accrington Stanley	2–0	Burton Albion	Accrington
15:00 GMT	McConville 39'; Opoku (yellow card) 50'; Sykes 65'; Finley (yellow card) 71'	Report	Nartey (yellow card) 62'; Akins (yellow card) 90+1'	Stadium: Wham Stadium; Attendance: 2,449; Referee: Christopher Sarginson

===== January =====
1 January 2020 24	Accrington Stanley	1–2	Rochdale	Accrington
15:00 GMT	Barclay (yellow card) 22'; Finley (yellow card) 55'; Zanzala 90+2'	Report	Henderson 45+4'; Dooley 64'	Stadium: Wham Stadium; Attendance: 2,975; Referee: Tom Nield

11 January 2020 25	Ipswich Town	4–1	Accrington Stanley	Ipswich
15:00 GMT	Jackson 12'; Norwood 29'; Judge 44'; Keane 90+2'; Chambers (yellow card) 90+4'	Report	Alese (yellow card) 72'; Zanzala 86' (pen.)	Stadium: Portman Road; Attendance: 17,536; Referee: Charles Breakspear

18 January 2020 26	Accrington Stanley	1–2	Southend United	Accrington
15:00 GMT	Charles 17'; Bishop (yellow card) 80'	Report	Kelman 11'; Demetriou 51' (pen.)	Stadium: Wham Stadium; Attendance: 2,146; Referee: Antony Coggins

25 January 2020 27	Burton Albion	1–1	Accrington Stanley	Burton upon Trent
15:00 GMT	Brayford 30'; O'Toole (yellow card) 36'; Edwards (yellow card) 45+2'; Quinn (yellow card) 59'	Report	Charles 15' (yellow card) 45+4'; Opoku (yellow card) 22'; Hughes (yellow card) 45+2'	Stadium: Pirelli Stadium; Attendance: 2,759; Referee: Kevin Johnson

28 January 2020 28	Accrington Stanley	0–2	Peterborough United	Accrington
19:45 GMT	Zanzala (yellow card) 72'	Report	Szmodics 11'; Butler (yellow card) 18'; Thompson (yellow card) 48'; Ward 51'	Stadium: Wham Stadium; Attendance: 1,816; Referee: Anthony Backhouse

===== February =====
1 February 2020 29	Accrington Stanley	2–1	AFC Wimbledon	Accrington
15:00 GMT	Clark 14'; Charles 21'; Pritchard (yellow card) 28' (yellow-red card) 55'	Report	Pigott 73'	Stadium: Wham Stadium; Attendance: 2,224; Referee: James Oldham

11 February 2020 30	Shrewsbury Town	0–2	Accrington Stanley	Shrewsbury
19:45 GMT	Beckles (yellow card) 9'; McAleny (yellow card) 28'; Ebanks-Landell (yellow card) 70'	Report	Grant 13'; Clark 71'; Johnson (yellow card) 80'; Charles (yellow card) 86'	Stadium: Montgomery Waters Meadow; Attendance: 4,699; Referee: Ollie Yates

15 February 2020 31	Accrington Stanley	4–3	Lincoln City	Accrington
15:00 GMT	Shackell 36' (o.g.); Diallo (yellow card) 45+1'; Charles (penalty missed) 48'; Maguire (yellow card) 65'; Pritchard 70'; Finley (yellow card) 75' (goal) 90+5'; Conneely 78' (yellow card) 90+10'; Hughes (yellow card) 90+3'	Report	Scully 30'; Eardley (yellow card) 40'; Lewis 53'; Shackell 76'	Stadium: Wham Stadium; Attendance: 2,279; Referee: Christopher Pollard

22 February 2020 32	Accrington Stanley	1–2	Rotherham United	Accrington
15:00 GMT	Clark 65'; Hughes (yellow card) 78'	Report	Barlaser (yellow card) 55'; Ladapo 64'; Wiles 90+1'	Stadium: Wham Stadium; Attendance: 3,447; Referee: Sebastian Stockbridge

25 February 2020 33	Oxford United	3–0	Accrington Stanley	Oxford
19:45 GMT	Henry 13'; Taylor 50', 72'	Report	Finley (yellow card) 71'; Johnson (yellow card) 77'	Stadium: Kassam Stadium; Attendance: 5,622; Referee: David Rock

29 February 2020 34	Bolton Wanderers	0–0	Accrington Stanley	Horwich
15:00 GMT	Bryan (yellow card) 73'	Report		Stadium: University of Bolton Stadium; Attendance: 12,011; Referee: Josh Smith

===== March =====
7 March 2020 35	Accrington Stanley	1–2	Tranmere Rovers	Accrington
15:00 GMT	Rodgers (yellow card) 39' (yellow-red card) 90+3'; Finley (yellow card) 72'; Woodyard 82' (o.g.)	Report	Vaughan 8'; Jennings (yellow card) 34'; Ellis 77'; Ridehalgh (yellow card) 79'; Davies (yellow card) 88'	Stadium: Wham Stadium; Attendance: 2,881; Referee: Will Finnie

14 March 2020	Portsmouth	v	Accrington Stanley	Milton
15:00 GMT				Stadium: Fratton Park
Note: Season was suspended until 3 April 2020, due to the COVID-19 pandemic.

21 March 2020	Accrington Stanley	v	Doncaster Rovers	Accrington
15:00 GMT				Stadium: Wham Stadium
Note: Season was suspended until 3 April 2020, due to the COVID-19 pandemic.

28 March 2020	Accrington Stanley	v	Coventry City	Accrington
15:00 GMT				Stadium: Wham Stadium
Note: Season was suspended until 3 April 2020, due to the COVID-19 pandemic.

===== April =====
4 April 2020	Gillingham	v	Accrington Stanley	Gillingham
15:00 GMT				Stadium: Priesfield Stadium
Note: On 3 April, the English Football League decided to postpone all football until safe to do so due to the COVID-19 pandemic.

10 April 2020	Accrington Stanley	v	Fleetwood Town	Accrington
15:00 BST				Stadium: Wham Stadium
Note: On 3 April, the English Football League decided to postpone all football until safe to do so due to the COVID-19 pandemic.

13 April 2020	Milton Keynes Dons	v	Accrington Stanley	Milton Keynes
15:00 BST				Stadium: Stadium MK
Note: On 3 April, the English Football League decided to postpone all football until safe to do so due to the COVID-19 pandemic.

18 April 2020	Accrington Stanley	v	Bristol Rovers	Accrington
15:00 BST				Stadium: Wham Stadium
Note: On 3 April, the English Football League decided to postpone all football until safe to do so due to the COVID-19 pandemic.

25 April 2020	Sunderland	v	Accrington Stanley	Sunderland
15:00 BST				Stadium: Stadium of Light
Note: On 3 April, the English Football League decided to postpone all football until safe to do so due to the COVID-19 pandemic.

===== May =====
3 May 2020	Accrington Stanley	v	Wycombe Wanderers	Accrington
15:00 BST				Stadium: Wham Stadium
Note: On 3 April, the English Football League decided to postpone all football until safe to do so due to the COVID-19 pandemic.

=== FA Cup ===
Win Draw Loss

The first round draw was made on 21 October 2019.

9 November 2019 First round	Accrington Stanley	0–2	Crewe Alexandra	Accrington
15:00 GMT	Opoku (yellow card) 38'; Hughes (red card) 77'; Carvalho (yellow card) 86'	Report	Kirk 45+2'; Porter 67' (pen.); Jääskeläinen (yellow card) 69'; Lowery (yellow card) 83'	Stadium: Wham Stadium; Attendance: 1,655; Referee: Neil Hair

=== EFL Cup ===
The first round draw was made on 20 June.

Win Draw Loss

13 August 2019 First round	Accrington Stanley	1–3	Sunderland	Accrington
19:45 BST	Maguire (yellow card) 53'; Barclay (yellow card) 58'; Bishop 61' (pen.)	Report	McNulty 17'; Maguire (yellow card) 51'; McGeady 79'; Wyke 90+4'	Stadium: Wham Stadium; Attendance: 2,343; Referee: Darren Drysdale

=== EFL Trophy ===
Win Draw Loss

On 9 July 2019, the pre-determined group stage draw was announced with Invited clubs to be drawn on 12 July 2019. The draw for the second round was made on 16 November 2019 live on Sky Sports. The third round draw was confirmed on 5 December 2019.

Pos	Div	Team	Pld	W	PW	PL	L	GF	GA	GD	Pts	Qualification
1	L1	Accrington Stanley	3	3	0	0	0	10	3	+7	9	Advance to Round 2
2	L1	Fleetwood Town	3	1	1	0	1	7	5	+2	5	Advance to Round 2
3	L2	Oldham Athletic	3	1	0	0	2	5	10	−5	3	
4	ACA	Liverpool U21	3	0	0	1	2	5	9	−4	1	

Source: EFL.com

3 September 2019 Group stages	Accrington Stanley	2–1	Fleetwood Town	Accrington
19:45 BST	Sherif (yellow card) 23'; Carvalho 53'; McConville 72'; Barclay (yellow card) 84'	Report	Biggins (red card) 25'; Rossiter (yellow card) 45+1'; Evans (yellow card) 60'; Hunter (yellow card) 68'; Madden 90+4' (pen.)	Stadium: Crown Ground; Attendance: 923; Referee: Darren Handley

8 October 2019 Group stage	Oldham Athletic	0–3	Accrington Stanley	Oldham
19:45 BST	Adams (yellow card) 22'; Fage (red card) 45+2'; Egert (yellow card) 75'	Report	Diallo 30' (yellow card) 47'; Zanzala 42' (pen.); Barclay (yellow card) 70'; Clark 86'	Stadium: Boundary Park; Attendance: 1,107; Referee: Ben Toner

29 October 2019 Group stages	Accrington Stanley	5–2	Liverpool U21	Accrington
19:45 GMT	Sykes 30'; Baker-Richardson 45'; Charles 52'; Clark 61'; Opoku (yellow card) 66'; Simpson 74'	Report	Dixon-Bonner 8'; Hill (yellow card) 41'; Christie-Davies (yellow card) 44'; Stewart 77'	Stadium: Crown Ground; Attendance: 1,002; Referee: Andy Haines

10 December 2019 Second round	Accrington Stanley	2–0	Bolton Wanderers	Accrington
19:45 GMT	Zanzala 10'; Bishop 85'	Report	Graham (yellow card) 36'	Stadium: Wham Stadium; Attendance: 930; Referee: Sebastian Stockbridge

7 January 2020 Third round	Fleetwood Town	2–2 (3–5 p)	Accrington Stanley	Fleetwood
19:45 GMT	Morris 50'; Andrew 68'	Report	Johnson (yellow card) 29'; Pritchard 35'; Opoku (yellow card) 45+2'; Alese (yellow card) 67'; Finley (yellow card) 73'; Sykes 90'	Stadium: Highbury Stadium; Attendance: 548; Referee: Robert Lewis
	Penalties
	Madden (penalty missed); Andrew (penalty scored); McAleny (penalty scored); Biggins (penalty scored)		Bursik (penalty scored); Pritchard (penalty scored); Opoku (penalty scored); Charles (penalty scored); Finley (penalty scored)

21 January 2020 Quarter-final	Salford City	2–1	Accrington Stanley	Salford
19:45 GMT	Burgess 45+3'; Elliott 49'; Conway (yellow card) 54'; Hogan (yellow card) 83'	Report	Finley 11' (yellow card) 35'; Alese (yellow card) 13'; Johnson (yellow card) 45+2'	Stadium: The Peninsula Stadium; Attendance: 1,401

== Statistics ==
=== Appearances and goals ===
As of 2 January 2020

No.	Pos	Nat	Player	Total		League One		FA Cup		League Cup		EFL Trophy	
No.	Pos	Nat	Player	Apps	Goals	Apps	Goals	Apps	Goals	Apps	Goals	Apps	Goals
Goalkeepers
1	GK	(Bulgaria) BUL	Dimitar Evtimov	21	0	19	0	1	0	1	0	0	0
30	GK	(England) ENG	Josef Bursik	7	0	5	0	0	0	0	0	2	0
40	GK	(England) ENG	Toby Savin	2	0	0	0	0	0	0	0	2	0
Defenders
2	DF	(England) ENG	Callum Johnson	25	0	21+1	0	1	0	1	0	0+1	0
3	DF	(England) ENG	Mark Hughes	26	1	23	1	1	0	1	0	1	0
4	DF	(England) ENG	Phil Edwards	8	0	0+4	0	0	0	0	0	4	0
5	DF	(England) ENG	Ross Sykes	27	2	21	1	1	0	0+1	0	4	1
12	DF	(England) ENG	Joe Maguire	8	0	5+1	0	1	0	0	0	1	0
14	DF	(Antigua and Barbuda) ANT	Zaine Francis-Angol	6	0	5	0	0	0	0	0	1	0
16	DF	(England) ENG	Ben Barclay	8	0	5	0	1	0	0	0	2	0
18	DF	(England) ENG	Harvey Rodgers	4	0	3	0	0	0	0	0	1	0
22	DF	(England) ENG	Matty Williams	0	0	0	0	0	0	0	0	0	0
34	DF	(England) ENG	Aji Alese	8	0	3+2	0	0	0	1	0	2	0
36	DF	(England) ENG	Jerome Opoku	18	0	14+1	0	0	0	1	0	2	0
Midfielders
6	MF	(Guinea) GUI	Lamine Kaba Sherif	9	0	2+3	0	0	0	0	0	3+1	0
7	MF	(England) ENG	Jordan Clark	28	5	23	3	1	0	1	0	3	2
8	MF	(England) ENG	Sam Finley	28	1	23	1	1	0	1	0	1+2	0
10	MF	(England) ENG	Joe Pritchard	24	1	12+7	1	0+1	0	1	0	3	0
11	MF	(England) ENG	Sean McConville	21	6	15+3	5	1	0	1	0	1	1
17	MF	(Portugal) POR	Érico Sousa	2	0	0	0	0	0	0	0	0+2	0
21	MF	(England) ENG	Harry Perritt	0	0	0	0	0	0	0	0	0	0
23	MF	(Portugal) POR	Wilson Carvalho	13	1	0+7	0	0+1	0	0+1	0	2+2	1
24	MF	(England) ENG	Lewis Gilboy	0	0	0	0	0	0	0	0	0	0
26	MF	(England) ENG	Lewis Doyle	0	0	0	0	0	0	0	0	0	0
28	MF	(Republic of Ireland) IRL	Seamus Conneely	23	0	19+1	0	0	0	1	0	2	0
Forwards
9	FW	(Republic of the Congo) CGO	Offrande Zanzala	17	7	7+8	5	0	0	0	0	2	2
19	FW	(England) ENG	Colby Bishop	24	12	19+1	10	1	0	1	1	1+1	1
20	FW	(Northern Ireland) NIR	Andrew Scott	0	0	0	0	0	0	0	0	0	0
25	FW	(England) ENG	Alex O'Neill	0	0	0	0	0	0	0	0	0	0
29	FW	(Northern Ireland) NIR	Billy Kee	0	0	0	0	0	0	0	0	0	0
31	FW	(England) ENG	Courtney Baker-Richardson	4	1	2	0	1	0	0	0	1	1
32	FW	(England) ENG	Dion Charles	27	6	16+6	5	0	0	0+1	0	2+2	1
35	FW	(England) ENG	Connor Simpson	3	1	1+1	0	0	0	0	0	0+1	1
Players transferred out during the season
10	FW	(England) ENG	Okera Simmonds	0	0	0	0	0	0	0	0	0	0
42	MF	(England) ENG	Sadou Diallo	4	1	1+2	0	0	0	0	0	1	1

=== Disciplinary record ===
As of 2 January 2020

Rank	Position	Name	League One		FA Cup		EFL Cup		EFL Trophy		Total	
Rank	Position	Name	Yellow card	Red card	Yellow card	Red card	Yellow card	Red card	Yellow card	Red card	Yellow card	Red card
1	DF	(England) Jerome Opoku	6	0	1	0	0	0	1	0	8	0
2	MF	(Republic of Ireland) Seamus Conneely	6	1	0	0	0	0	0	0	6	1
2	MF	(England) Sam Finley	6	0	0	0	0	0	0	0	6	0
4	DF	(England) Callum Johnson	5	0	0	0	0	0	0	0	5	0
4	DF	(England) Ben Barclay	2	0	0	0	1	0	2	0	5	0
6	DF	(England) Ross Sykes	4	1	0	0	0	0	0	0	4	1
6	MF	(England) Sean McConville	4	1	0	0	0	0	0	0	4	1
8	MF	(England) Jordan Clark	3	0	0	0	0	0	0	0	3	0
9	DF	(England) Mark Hughes	2	1	0	0	0	0	0	0	2	1
9	DF	(Republic of Ireland) Joe Maguire	1	0	0	0	1	0	0	0	2	0
9	MF	(England) Wilson Carvalho	1	0	1	0	0	0	0	0	2	0
12	DF	(Antigua and Barbuda) Zaine Francis-Angol	1	1	0	0	0	0	0	0	1	1
12	GK	(Bulgaria) Dimitar Evtimov	1	0	0	0	0	0	0	0	1	0
12	DF	(Guinea) Lamine Kaba Sherif	0	0	0	0	0	0	1	0	1	0
12	DF	(England) Harvey Rodgers|	1	0	0	0	0	0	0	0	1	0
12	DF	(England) Aji Alese	1	0	0	0	0	0	0	0	1	0
12	GK	(England) Sadou Diallo	1	0	0	0	0	0	0	0	1	0
12	Total		43	5	2	0	2	0	4	0	51	5
