= List of Northern Ireland football transfers winter 2022–23 =

This is a list of Northern Irish football transfers for the 2022–23 winter transfer window. Only transfers featuring NIFL Premiership are listed.

== NIFL Premiership ==
Note: Flags indicate national team as has been defined under FIFA eligibility rules. Players may hold more than one non-FIFA nationality.

=== Linfield ===
In:

No.	Pos.	Nation	Player
21	MF	ENG	Max Haygarth (free agent)
28	FW	NIR	Kyle Lafferty (free agent)
36	FW	NIR	Rhys Annett (from Dundela)
37	DF	NIR	Ryan McKay (from Dundela)

Out:

No.	Pos.	Nation	Player
10	MF	NIR	Jordan Stewart (on loan to Glenavon)

=== Cliftonville ===
In:

No.	Pos.	Nation	Player
10	FW	NIR	David Parkhouse (on loan from Ballymena United)
32	GK	NIR	Gerard Doherty (free agent)

Out:

No.	Pos.	Nation	Player
1	GK	ENG	Fynn Talley (loan return to (England) Brighton & Hove Albion U21)
21	MF	NIR	Gerard Storey (on loan to Annagh United)
28	DF	NIR	Stephen McGuinness (on loan to Annagh United)

=== Glentoran ===
In:

No.	Pos.	Nation	Player
36	GK	NIR	Alex Henderson (from (Scotland) Airdrieonians)
38	MF	NIR	Niall McGinn (from (Scotland) Dundee)
40	FW	ENG	Junior Ogedi-Uzokwe (from (Republic of Ireland) Bohemians)

Out:

No.	Pos.	Nation	Player
11	FW	NIR	Ally Roy (on loan to (Scotland) Greenock Morton)
13	GK	CAN	Michael Argyrides (on loan to Harland & Wolff Welders)
15	DF	NIR	Patrick McClean (retired)
28	MF	NIR	Jonathan Russell (on loan to Dundela)
46	MF	NIR	Bailey Locke (on loan to Dundela)
—	FW	NIR	Josh Stuart (on loan to Dundela)
—	FW	NIR	Kirk McLaughlin (on loan to Loughgall)
—	FW	NIR	Jordan Jenkins (on loan to Dungannon Swifts, previously on loan at Portadown)
—	MF	IRL	Ciaran O'Connor (free agent, previously on loan at Newry City)

=== Crusaders ===
In:

No.	Pos.	Nation	Player
16	DF	NIR	Cameron Stewart (on loan from (England) Ipswich Town U21)

Out:

No.	Pos.	Nation	Player
24	FW	ENG	McCauley Snelgrove (loan return to (England) Hull City U18)
26	MF	NIR	Aidan Steele (on loan to Ards)
27	FW	NIR	Johnny McMurray (to Warrenpoint Town)

=== Larne ===
In:

No.	Pos.	Nation	Player
19	MF	SCO	Joe Thomson (from Derry City)
20	FW	NIR	Thomas Maguire (from (United States) Nova Southeastern Sharks)
22	DF	NIR	Micheál Glynn (from Derry City)
27	FW	RSA	BJ Banda (from Ballinamallard United)
28	GK	ENG	Jamie Pardington (from (England) Grimsby Town)
29	FW	SCO	Andy Ryan (from (Scotland) Hamilton Academical)
—	MF	NED	Randy Wolters (free agent)

Out:

No.	Pos.	Nation	Player
11	MF	NIR	Ben Doherty (to Derry City)
14	MF	NIR	Andrew Scott (to Coleraine)
24	MF	NIR	Jeff Hughes (retired)
25	MF	NIR	Dylan Sloan (on loan to Newry City)
30	FW	NIR	Matthew Lusty (on loan to Newry City)

=== Coleraine ===
In:

No.	Pos.	Nation	Player
13	FW	NIR	Eamonn Fyfe (from Dundela)
29	MF	NIR	Andrew Scott (from Larne)

Out:

No.	Pos.	Nation	Player
9	FW	NIR	James McLaughlin (on loan to Carrick Rangers)
19	MF	NIR	Evan McLaughlin (loan return to Derry City)
—	DF	NIR	Aaron Canning (to Portadown)
—	FW	NIR	Cathair Friel (on loan to Portadown, previously on loan at Institute)

=== Glenavon ===
In:

No.	Pos.	Nation	Player
25	DF	NIR	Aaron Rogers (from Annagh United)
77	MF	NIR	Jordan Stewart (on loan from Linfield)

Out:

No.	Pos.	Nation	Player
3	DF	NIR	Micheál Glynn (loan return to Derry City)
20	MF	NIR	Conor Scannell (to Ards)
26	FW	IRL	Josh Doyle (to (Republic of Ireland) Bluebell United)

=== Ballymena United ===
In:

No.	Pos.	Nation	Player
20	DF	NIR	Robert McVarnock (from Newington)

Out:

No.	Pos.	Nation	Player
6	DF	NIR	Caolan Loughran (to Loughgall)
9	FW	NIR	Paul McElroy (to Portadown)
19	FW	NIR	David Parkhouse (on loan to Cliftonville)
22	DF	IRL	Conor Keeley (to (Republic of Ireland) Drogheda United)
23	MF	NIR	Jake Corbett (on loan to Dundela)
—	GK	NIR	Sam Johnston (on loan to Dundela, previously on loan at Harland & Wolff Welders)

=== Dungannon Swifts ===
In:

No.	Pos.	Nation	Player
32	FW	NIR	Jordan Jenkins (on loan from Glentoran, previously on loan at Portadown)

Out:

No.	Pos.	Nation	Player
4	DF	IRL	Garry Breen (free agent)
15	FW	NIR	Ben Gallagher (on loan to Dergview)
16	DF	IRL	Brendan Barr (loan return to Derry City)
47	MF	NIR	James Convie (on loan to Armagh City)
—	FW	NIR	Ruairi McDonald (on loan to Annagh United)

=== Carrick Rangers ===
In:

No.	Pos.	Nation	Player
12	MF	NIR	Daniel Kelly (free agent)
26	MF	NIR	Jamal Dupree (from Derriaghy)
30	FW	LTU	Nedas Mačiulaitis (from Loughgall)
32	FW	NIR	James McLaughlin (on loan from Coleraine)

Out:

No.	Pos.	Nation	Player
19	FW	NIR	Jonathan Doyle (to Lisburn Distillery)
24	FW	NIR	Peter McKiernan (to Dundela)
27	MF	NIR	Paul Waite (free agent)
28	MF	NIR	Jack Chambers (free agent)
29	MF	NIR	Aodhán Gillen (to Dundela)

=== Portadown ===
In:

No.	Pos.	Nation	Player
17	DF	NIR	Lee Chapman (from Dundela)
24	DF	NIR	Aaron Canning (from Coleraine)
26	DF	NIR	Christopher Rodgers (from Dundela)
31	MF	NIR	Eoghan McCawl (from Dundela)
32	FW	NIR	Cathair Friel (on loan from Coleraine, previously on loan at Institute)
36	FW	NIR	Benny Igiehon (from Dundela)
40	FW	NIR	Paul McElroy (from Ballymena United)
42	DF	NIR	Matthew Walker (from Institute)
43	GK	CZE	Ondřej Mastný (on loan from (England) Manchester United)
44	FW	IRL	Alan O'Sullivan (on loan from Warrenpoint Town)
45	MF	IRL	Aaron Harkin (from Maiden City)

Out:

No.	Pos.	Nation	Player
4	DF	IRL	Howard Beverland (to Ballyclare Comrades)
8	MF	IRL	Leo Donnellan (to (England) Hendon)
13	GK	NIR	Ruadhán McKenna (free agent)
22	MF	RSA	Katlego Mashigo (to (Republic of Ireland) Finn Harps)
27	MF	NIR	Jonah Mitchell (on loan to Dundela)
28	DF	NIR	Jack Ovens (on loan to Dollingstown)
29	DF	SCO	Jake Willis (on loan to Lisburn Distillery)
30	FW	NIR	Jordan Jenkins (loan return to Glentoran)
33	GK	NIR	Ronan Burns (on loan to Annagh United)
34	FW	ALB	Gledis Cakaj (on loan to Dollingstown)
37	FW	POL	Igor Rutkowski (on loan to Knockbreda)

=== Newry City ===
In:

No.	Pos.	Nation	Player
40	FW	NIR	Matthew Lusty (on loan from Larne)
42	MF	NIR	Dylan Sloan (on loan from Larne)
45	FW	NGR	Ola Adeyemo (free agent)

Out:

No.	Pos.	Nation	Player
7	MF	IRL	Ciaran O'Connor (loan return to Glentoran)
29	MF	NIR	Donal Rocks (loan return to Cliftonville)
32	FW	ALG	Mohamed Boudiaf (to (Republic of Ireland) Longford Town)

== See also ==
- 2022–23 NIFL Premiership
