= Wilson Carvalho =

Portuguese footballer (born 1993)

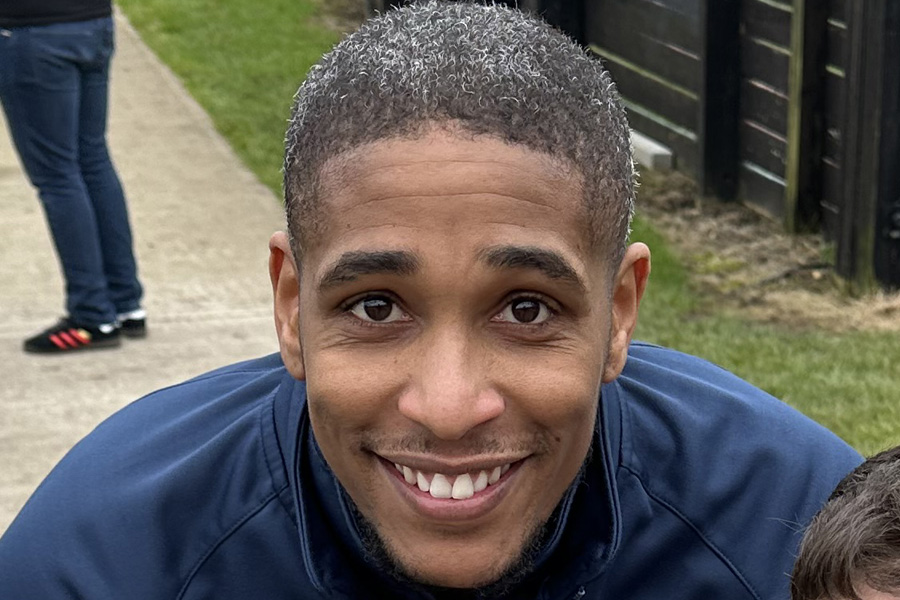
- Carvalho with Kings Langley in February 2023

Personal information
- Full name: Wilson Roberto Neves Bento de Carvalho
- Date of birth: 4 July 1993 (age 33)
- Place of birth: Lisbon, Portugal
- Position: Winger

Youth career
- 20??–2010: Fulham
- 2010–2012: Stevenage

Senior career*
Years	Team	Apps	(Gls)
2012–2013	North Greenford United	1	(0)
2013–2014	Port Vale	0	(0)
2013	→ Hemel Hempstead Town (loan)	3	(0)
2013–2014	→ Corby Town (loan)	4	(0)
2014	→ Ilkeston (loan)	3	(0)
2014–2015	Corby Town	47	(10)
2015	→ Canvey Island (dual registration)	5	(0)
2015–2017	Kettering Town	55	(18)
2017	Oxford City	14	(0)
2018	Kettering Town	7	(0)
2018–2019	Stratford Town	38	(10)
2019–2020	Accrington Stanley	8	(0)
2020	Macclesfield Town	0	(0)
2020–2021	Hampton & Richmond Borough	15	(1)
2021	Hendon	11	(3)
2021–2022	Walton Casuals	13	(0)
2022	Hayes & Yeading United		
2022	Westfield	1	(0)
2022–2023	Kings Langley		
2023–2024	Spalding United	8	(2)
Total		223	(44)
- * Club domestic league appearances and goals

Wilson Roberto Neves Bento de Carvalho (born 4 July 1993) is a Portuguese former professional footballer who played as a winger.

He spent his youth with Fulham, Stevenage and Port Vale. He spent 2012 to 2019 playing for a multitude of non-League clubs, including: North Greenford United, Hemel Hempstead Town, Ilkeston, Corby Town, Canvey Island, Kettering Town, Oxford City and Stratford Town. With Corby Town, he won the Southern League Premier Division title in 2014–15, and he lifted the Southern League Cup with Stratford Town in 2019. He was signed by Accrington Stanley in July 2019 and made his debut in the English Football League the following month. He joined Macclesfield Town in September 2020, though the club were liquidated later in the month. He signed for Hampton & Richmond Borough in October 2020. He played for Hendon and Walton Casuals in the 2021–22 campaign and later played for Hayes & Yeading United, Westfield, Kings Langley and Spalding United.

== Career ==
=== Non-League ===
Carvalho spent his youth at the centre of excellence at Stevenage after leaving Fulham's Academy. He went on join the Nike Academy and was signed to Port Vale's youth team after impressing on trial at Birmingham City. He never made a first-team appearance at Vale Park, though was loaned out to Southern League Premier Division side Hemel Hempstead Town for one month after the "Tudors" suffered an injury crisis in November 2013. On 6 December, he joined Hempstead's divisional rivals Corby Town on a one-month loan deal. On 10 January, he was loaned out to Northern Premier League Premier Division side Ilkeston and featured in three games for the "Robins" during a one-month stay. He was released by "Valiants" manager Micky Adams in April 2014.

He signed with Corby Town and scored 11 goals in 51 appearances across the 2014–15 campaign as Tommy Wright's "Steelmen" won promotion as champions of the Southern League Premier Division. Corby also reached the final of the League Cup but lost out to Poole Town on away goals. He had trials at Yeovil Town and Scottish Premiership club Heart of Midlothian in summer 2015. He had a successful trial at Braintree Town, but instead signed with Isthmian League Premier Division club Canvey Island on dual registration forms.

He joined Kettering Town in November 2015. He was handed a six-game ban for spitting in a game against Bedworth United. He said that "I have definitely learned a few lessons" from the incident. He ended the 2015–16 campaign with 12 goals from 29 games and went on to add a further eight goals from 34 appearances in 2016–17. He signed with Oxford City on 9 February 2017, having previously played under manager Mark Jones in the youth team at Stevenage. He featured 15 times for the "Hoops".

On 20 March 2018, he rejoined former club Kettering Town. He played nine games for the "Poppies" in what remained of the 2017–18 season. On 6 August 2018, he was one of four players to sign a contract with Stratford Town of the Southern League Premier Division Central. A key player for Town, he scored 15 goals from 52 games in the 2018–19 season, helping the club to reach the play-offs and the League Cup final. They were beaten 3–1 by King's Lynn Town in the play-off semi-finals, but managed to beat Cinderford Town 1–0 in the League Cup final.

=== Accrington Stanley ===
On 23 July 2019, he signed a one-year deal with the option of a further year at League One side Accrington Stanley after impressing manager John Coleman on trial in pre-season friendlies. Assistant manager Jimmy Bell had previously coached him in Port Vale's development squad. He scored his first goal for Stanley in a 2–1 victory over Fleetwood Town in an EFL Trophy tie on 3 September. He was one of five players released by the club at the end of the 2019–20 season.

=== Return to non-League ===
Wilson was unveiled as signed for Macclesfield Town on 7 September 2020. The club was wound up a few days later, on 16 September. He signed for National League South club Hampton & Richmond Borough in October 2020. He scored one goal in 17 appearances in the 2020–21 season, which was curtailed early due to the COVID-19 pandemic in England. He was handed a six-match ban by The Football Association after being sent off for spitting in a game with Bedworth United.

He joined Southern League Premier Division South side Hendon in July 2021. He scored two goals on his debut in a 4–0 win at Truro City on 14 August, the first of three goals in 13 games for the "Greens". On 23 November 2021, he signed with divisional rivals Walton Casuals. He played 14 games in what remained of the 2021–22 season. Walton Casuals folded on 9 June 2022. In August 2022, Carvalho signed for Hayes & Yeading United, before signing for Westfield later that month, and for Kings Langley in September 2022. Kings Langley were relegated from the Southern League Premier Division Central at the end of the 2022–23 season.

In June 2023, Carvalho signed for Northern Premier League Division One Midlands club Spalding United. He scored two goals in 14 games at the start of the 2023–24 season, though did not feature after mid-October.

== Career statistics ==
Appearances and goals by club, season and competition
Club	Season	League			FA Cup		League Cup		Other		Total	
Club	Season	Division	Apps	Goals	Apps	Goals	Apps	Goals	Apps	Goals	Apps	Goals
North Greenford United	2012–13	Southern League; Division One Central	1	0							2	0
Port Vale	2013–14	League One	0	0	0	0	0	0	0	0	0	0
Hemel Hempstead Town (loan)	2013–14	Southern League; Premier Division	3	0	0	0	0	0	2 (Note: Appearances in the FA Trophy)	3	5	3
Ilkeston (loan)	2013–14	Northern Premier League; Premier Division	3	0	0	0	0	0	0	0	3	0
Corby Town	2013–14	Southern League; Premier Division	4	0	0	0	0	0	0	0	4	0
Corby Town	2014–15	Southern League; Premier Division	42	10	2	1	6	0	1 (Note: Appearances in the Northamptonshire Senior Cup)	0	51	11
Corby Town	2015–16	National League North	5	0	0	0	0	0	0	0	5	0
Corby Town	Total		51	10	2	1	6	0	1	0	60	11
Canvey Island (dual registration)	2015–16	Isthmian League; Premier Division	5	0							6	0
Kettering Town	2015–16	Southern League; Premier Division	28	12	0	0	0	0	1	0	29	12
Kettering Town	2016–17	Southern League; Premier Division	27	6	4	2	1	0	2	0	34	8
Kettering Town	Total		55	18	4	2	1	0	3	0	63	20
Oxford City	2016–17	National League South	14	0							15	0
Kettering Town	2017–18	Southern League; Premier Division	7	0	0	0	0	0	2 (Note: 1 appearance in the play-offs and 1 appearance in the Northamptonshire Senior Cup)	0	9	0
Stratford Town	2018–19	Southern League; Premier Division Central	38	10							52	15
Accrington Stanley	2019–20	EFL League One	8	0	1	0	1	0	3 (Note: Appearances in the play-offs)	0	13	0
Hampton & Richmond Borough	2020–21	National League South	15	1	2	0	0	0	0	0	17	1
Hendon	2021–22	Southern League; Premier Division South	11	3	0	0	0	0	2 (Note: 1 appearance in the FA Trophy and 1 appearance in the Middlesex Senior Cup)	0	13	3
Walton Casuals	2021–22	Southern League; Premier Division South	13	0	0	0	0	0	1 (Note: Appearances in the Surrey Senior Cup)	0	14	0
Westfield	2022–23	Isthmian League; South Central Division	1	0	1	0	0	0	0	0	2	0
Spalding United	2023–24	Northern Premier League; Division One Midlands	8	2	4	0	0	0	2 (Note: 1 appearance in the FA Trophy and 1 appearance in the Lincolnshire Senior Cup)	0	14	2
Career total			233	44							288	55

== Honours ==
Corby Town

- Southern League Premier Division: 2014–15
- Southern League Cup runner-up: 2015

Stratford Town

- Southern League Cup: 2019
