= Ryan Stratulis =

English footballer

Personal information
- Full name: Ryan William Stratulis
- Date of birth: 18 April 2003 (age 23)
- Position: Midfielder

Youth career
- Tranmere Rovers

Senior career*
Years	Team	Apps	(Gls)
2021–2023	Tranmere Rovers	0	(0)
2021	→ Marine (loan)	1	(0)
2022–2023	→ Connah's Quay Nomads (loan)	15	(3)
2023–2024	Connah's Quay Nomads	11	(1)
2025	Bangor 1876		
- * Club domestic league appearances and goals as of 23:09, 27 April 2023 (UTC)

Ryan William Stratulis (born 18 April 2003) is an English professional footballer who plays as a midfielder.

== Career ==
Stratulis made his senior debut for Tranmere Rovers on 9 November 2021, playing the full ninety minutes of a 3–2 win over Oldham Athletic in an EFL Trophy fixture at Prenton Park. On 20 November, he joined Marine of the Northern Premier League Division One West on a one-month loan. In 2022, he joined Connah's Quay Nomads on loan. On 9 May 2023, Tranmere announced he was being released.

In June 2023 he returned to Connah's Quay on a permanent basis.

In January 2025 he joined Bangor 1876 He departed from the club at the end of the season.

== Career statistics ==
As of match played 9 November 2021

Appearances and goals by club, season and competition
Club	Season	League			FA Cup		EFL Cup		Other		Total	
Club	Season	Division	Apps	Goals	Apps	Goals	Apps	Goals	Apps	Goals	Apps	Goals
Tranmere Rovers	2021–22	EFL League Two	0	0	0	0	0	0	1 (Note: Appearance(s) in EFL Trophy)	0	1	0
Marine (loan)	2021–22	Northern Premier League; Division One West	1	0	0	0	0	0	1 (Note: Appearance(s) in FA Trophy)	0	2	0
Career total			1	0	0	0	0	0	2	0	3	0
