= Tom Davies (footballer, born 1992) =

English footballer

Personal information
- Full name: Thomas Christopher Davies
- Date of birth: 18 April 1992 (age 34)
- Place of birth: Warrington, England
- Height: 6 ft 1 in (1.85 m)
- Position: Defender

Team information
- Current team: Radcliffe

Youth career
- 2001–2005: Manchester United
- 2005–2008: Blackburn Rovers

Senior career*
Years	Team	Apps	(Gls)
2011–2013	Team Northumbria		
2013–2014	FC United of Manchester	27	(4)
2014–2015	Fleetwood Town	0	(0)
2014	→ FC United of Manchester (loan)	13	(1)
2014	→ Alfreton Town (loan)	9	(0)
2015	→ Lincoln City (loan)	1	(0)
2015	→ Southport (loan)	9	(0)
2015–2016	Accrington Stanley	32	(1)
2016–2017	Portsmouth	12	(0)
2017–2019	Coventry City	44	(0)
2019–2021	Bristol Rovers	19	(1)
2021	→ Barrow (loan)	12	(1)
2021–2025	Tranmere Rovers	135	(5)
2025–2026	Salisbury	22	(1)
2026	→ Chester (loan)	13	(3)
2026–	Radcliffe	3	(0)
- * Club domestic league appearances and goals as of 11:00, 22 August 2026 (UTC)

Thomas Christopher Davies (born 18 April 1992) is an English footballer who plays as a defender for National League North club Radcliffe.

== Career ==
Born in Warrington, England, Davies started his career with local junior side Grappenhall Juniors where he was spotted by Manchester United and Manchester City and invited for trials with both clubs. He subsequently signed for Manchester United as an eight-year-old, where he spent four years at the club as a youth player before he was released in 2005. He later signed for Blackburn Rovers but was released at the age of sixteen having failed to earn a scholarship.

Whilst he was at studying at college he had brief spells at non-league sides Warrington Town and Runcorn Town before being offered a football scholarship at Northumbria University. And cameo Preston Whilst at University he played for Team Northumbria of the Northern Football League Division Two. In his first season with the club he won the League and Cup double, gaining promotion to Division One. He also featured in the 2012 Northumberland Senior Cup final at St James' Park scoring twice in a defeat to Newcastle United Reserves on penalties after a 4–4 draw. After completing his degree in the summer of 2013, he returned home and signed for Northern Premier League Premier Division side FC United of Manchester after impressing on trial.

In March 2014, after impressing with FC United he signed for Football League Two side Fleetwood Town on an eighteen-month contract, and was immediately loaned back to his former club until the end of the season. He made a total 45 appearances for the FC United, scoring five goals. After failing to secure a place in the Fleetwood side, in October 2014 he was loaned to Conference Premier side Alfreton Town on a one-month loan deal. In November 2014 his loan was extended for a further month, in total he made eleven appearances for the club. In February 2015, he was sent out on loan again to the Conference Premier, signing for Lincoln City on a one-month loan deal. However, he failed to make an impact and only made one appearance as a substitute for Sean Newton in a 2–0 defeat to Bristol Rovers. In March 2015, he was sent out again to the Conference Premier, signing for Southport on loan until the end of the season. He made nine appearances for the Sandgrounders helping them avoid relegation to the National League North.

In May 2015, he was released by Fleetwood and signed for Football League Two side Accrington Stanley on a one-year deal. He made his professional debut in August 2015 in the 1–1 draw with Luton Town. He scored his first goal for the club in a 3–2 win at Cambridge United on 21 November 2015.

=== Coventry City ===
On 31 August 2017, Davies signed for Coventry City for a nominal fee from Portsmouth, on a two-year deal. Davies made his debut on 2 September 2017 in a 0–0 away draw with Chesterfield, going on to make another 21 league appearances as Coventry reached the play-offs. Davies featured in the first leg of the semi-final in a 1–1 draw with Notts County but failed to appear in the second leg or the final as City beat Exeter City 3–1 in order to return to League One at the first time of asking, securing Davies' second promotion from the division in three seasons.

=== Bristol Rovers ===
On 11 June 2019, Davies joined fellow League One side Bristol Rovers as he was out of contract with Coventry that summer. He made his debut on 3 August 2019, in an opening day 2–0 defeat away at Blackpool. He scored his first goal for the club on 12 October 2019 as he impressively volleyed home the only goal of a tight win over Milton Keynes Dons, a win that saw Rovers continue to defy pre-season expectations and go up to 4th in the table. Davies returned to first-team action in January 2020 after missing three months with tendinitis, before Davies had to have surgery on his knee in February 2020, causing him to miss the rest of the season. In July 2020, manager Ben Garner revealed that Davies would most likely be out until early 2021, revealing that he had needed surgery in the other knee. After spending the second half of the 2020–21 season on loan at Barrow, it was announced at the end of the season that Davies would not be having his contract renewed and would be leaving the club after two years.

==== Barrow (loan) ====
On 18 January 2021, Davies joined League Two side Barrow on loan until the end of the season in a bid to get first team match action as he made his return from injury. He made his debut on 30 January 2021, playing the first 74 minutes of a 2–1 defeat to Bradford City. Davies' first goal for the club opened the scoring of a vital 3–2 victory over Crawley Town.

=== Tranmere Rovers ===
On 9 June 2021, Davies joined League Two side Tranmere Rovers on a free transfer, signing a one-year contract.

On 6 May 2025, the club announced the player would be released in June when his contract expired.

=== Salisbury ===
On 25 July 2025, Davies joined National League South side Salisbury.

On 13 February 2026, he joined National League North club Chester on loan for the remainder of the season.

=== Radcliffe ===
On 16 June 2026, Davies joined National League North side Radcliffe on an initial one-year deal with the option to extend.

== Career statistics ==
As of end of 2025–26 season

Appearances and goals by club, season and competition
Club	Season	League			FA Cup		League Cup		Other		Total	
Club	Season	Division	Apps	Goals	Apps	Goals	Apps	Goals	Apps	Goals	Apps	Goals
FC United of Manchester	2013–14	NPL Premier Division	27	4	1	0	—		4 (Note: Two appearances in FA Trophy, two in Northern Premier League Challenge Cup)	0	32	4
FC United of Manchester (loan)	2013–14	NPL Premier Division	13	1	—		—		—		13	1
FC United of Manchester (loan)	Total		40	5	1	0	—		4	0	45	5
Fleetwood Town	2014–15	League One	0	0	—		0	0	0	0	0	0
Alfreton Town (loan)	2014–15	Conference Premier	9	0	2	0	—		—		11	0
Lincoln City (loan)	2014–15	Conference Premier	1	0	—		—		—		1	0
Southport (loan)	2014–15	Conference Premier	9	0	—		—		—		9	0
Accrington Stanley	2015–16	League Two	32	1	2	0	1	0	4 (Note: Appearances in Football League Trophy and Playoffs)	0	38	1
Portsmouth	2016–17	League Two	12	0	0	0	1	0	2	0	15	0
Portsmouth	2017–18	League One	0	0	0	0	0	0	1	0	1	0
Portsmouth	Total		12	0	0	0	1	0	3	0	16	0
Coventry City	2017–18	League Two	21	0	3	0	0	0	1 (Note: Appearance in the play-offs)	0	25	0
Coventry City	2018–19	League One	23	0	0	0	1	0	1 (Note: Appearances in EFL Trophy)	0	25	0
Coventry City	Total		44	0	3	0	1	0	2	0	50	0
Bristol Rovers	2019–20	League One	19	1	0	0	2	0	1	0	22	1
Bristol Rovers	2020–21	League One	0	0	0	0	0	0	0	0	0	0
Bristol Rovers	Total		19	1	0	0	2	0	1	0	22	1
Barrow (loan)	2020–21	League Two	12	1	—		—		0	0	12	1
Tranmere Rovers	2021–22	League Two	36	1	1	0	1	0	3	0	41	1
Tranmere Rovers	2022–23	League Two	28	0	1	0	0	0	0	0	29	0
Tranmere Rovers	2023–24	League Two	37	3	1	0	2	0	0	0	40	3
Tranmere Rovers	2024–25	League Two	34	1	1	0	1	0	2	0	38	1
Tranmere Rovers	Total		135	5	4	0	4	0	5	0	148	5
Career total			309	13	12	0	9	0	19	0	352	13

== Honours ==
Portsmouth

- EFL League Two: 2016–17

Coventry City

- EFL League Two play-offs: 2018
