= 2018–19 Crawley Town F.C. season =

Crawley Town
2018–19 season
- Chairman: Ziya Eren
- Manager: Harry Kewell (until 31 August 2018) Filipe Morais (caretaker) (until 7 September 2018); Jimmy Smith (caretaker) (until 7 September 2018) Gabriele Cioffi (7 September 2018)
- Stadium: Broadfield Stadium
- League Two: 19th
- FA Cup: First round
- EFL Cup: First round
- EFL Trophy: Group stage
- Top goalscorer: League: Ollie Palmer (9 goals); All: Ollie Palmer (9 goals)
- Highest home attendance: 3,335 vs Lincoln (23 March 2018)
- Lowest home attendance: 1,268 vs Portsmouth (9 October 2018)
- Average home league attendance: 2,290
Home colours	Away colours	Third colours

The 2018–19 season was Crawley Town's 123rd season in their history and their fourth consecutive season in League Two. Along with League Two, the club also competed in the FA Cup, EFL Cup and EFL Trophy.

The season covered the period from 1 July 2018 to 30 June 2019.

== Players ==
=== First team squad ===
As of 3 November 2018.

No.	Name	Nat	Position	Since	Date of birth (age)	Signed from	Games	Goals
Goalkeepers
1	Glenn Morris	(England)	GK	2016	20 December 1983 (age 42)	(England) Gillingham	104	0
12	Yusuf Mersin	(Turkey)	GK	2016	23 September 1994 (age 32)	(Turkey) Kasımpaşa	18	0
Defenders
2	Lewis Young	(England)	RB/RM/LM	2014	27 September 1989 (age 37)	(England) Bury	194	3
3	Josh Doherty	(Northern Ireland)	CB/RB/LB	2017	15 March 1996 (age 30)	(Northern Ireland) Ards	30	0
5	Joe McNerney	(England)	CB	2015	24 January 1990 (age 36)	(England) Woking	75	5
6	Mark Connolly	(Republic of Ireland)	CB/DM/RB	2016	16 December 1991 (age 34)	(Scotland) Kilmarnock	183	9
16	Joe Maguire	(England)	LB/CB/RB	2018	18 January 1996 (age 30)	(England) Fleetwood Town	13	1
18	David Sesay	(England)	RB	2018	18 September 1998 (age 28)	(England) Watford	2	0
20	Romain Vincelot	(France)	CB/DM/CM	2018	29 October 1985 (age 41)	(England) Bradford City	14	0
33	Bondz N'Gala	(England)	CB	2018	13 September 1989 (age 37)	(England) Dagenham & Redbridge	8	1
Midfielders
4	Josh Payne	(England)	DM	2016	25 November 1990 (age 35)	(England) Eastleigh	83	6
7	Reece Grego-Cox	(Republic of Ireland)	CF/RW	2018	12 November 1996 (age 29)	(England) Woking	5	0
8	Jimmy Smith	(England)	CM/RM/RB	2014	7 January 1987 (age 39)	(England) Stevenage	168	20
11	Luke Gambin	(Malta)	LW/LM	2018	16 March 1993 (age 33)	(England) Luton Town	9	1
14	George Francomb	(England)	RM/RB/CM	2018	8 September 1991 (age 35)	(England) AFC Wimbledon	17	0
15	Ashley Nathaniel-George	(England)	RW	2018	14 May 1995 (age 31)	(England) Hendon	14	3
21	Dannie Bulman	(England)	CM/DM	2017	24 January 1979 (age 47)	(England) AFC Wimbledon	342	13
22	Filipe Morais	(Portugal)	RW/LW/AM	2018	21 November 1985 (age 40)	(England) Bolton Wanderers	17	4
25	Mark Randall	(England)	CM/DM/AM	2017	28 September 1989 (age 37)	(Wales) Newport County	42	1
Forwards
9	Ollie Palmer	(England)	CF	2018	21 January 1992 (age 34)	(England) Lincoln City	18	9
10	Dominic Poleon	(England)	CF/LW/RW	2018	7 September 1993 (age 33)	(England) Bradford City	15	1
26	Brian Galach	(Poland)	CF	2018	16 May 2001 (age 25)	(England) Aldershot Town	2	0
27	Tarryn Allarakhia	(England)	LW	2018	17 October 1997 (age 29)	(England) Colchester United	7	0
28	Panutche Camará	(Guinea-Bissau)	CF/RW	2017	28 February 1997 (age 29)	(England) Dulwich Hamlet	53	5

== New contracts ==
Date	Position	Nationality	Name	Contract length	Contract end	Ref.
4 July 2018	RB	(England)	Lewis Young	2 years	2020	

== Transfers ==
=== In ===
Date from	Position	Nationality	Name	From	Fee	Ref.
1 July 2018	RM	(England)	George Francomb	AFC Wimbledon	Free transfer	
1 July 2018	CF	(Poland)	Brian Galach	Aldershot Town	Free transfer	
1 July 2018	RW	(England)	Ashley Nathaniel-George	Hendon	Free transfer	
1 July 2018	CF	(England)	Ollie Palmer	Lincoln City	Undisclosed	
5 July 2018	CF	(England)	Dominic Poleon	Bradford City	Undisclosed	
16 July 2018	CF	(Republic of Ireland)	Reece Grego-Cox	Woking	Free transfer	
19 July 2018	RW	(Portugal)	Filipe Morais	Bolton Wanderers	Free transfer	
19 July 2018	DM	(France)	Romain Vincelot	Bradford City	Undisclosed	
1 August 2018	LW	(England)	Tarryn Allarakhia	Colchester United	Free transfer	
1 August 2018	RB	(England)	David Sesay	Watford	Free transfer	
13 August 2018	CM	(England)	Robert Milsom	Notts County	Free transfer	
31 August 2018	CB	(England)	Bondz N'Gala	Dagenham & Redbridge	Free transfer	
1 January 2019	CF	(England)	Ricky German	Hendon	Undisclosed	
8 January 2019	CB	(England)	Tom Dallison	(Scotland) Falkirk	Free transfer	
1 February 2019	CF	(England)	Ibrahim Meite	(Wales) Cardiff City	Free transfer	

=== Out ===
Date from	Position	Nationality	Name	To	Fee	Ref.
28 June 2018	LW	(England)	Dean Cox	Eastbourne Borough	Mutual consent	(Note: Dean Cox joined Eastbourne Borough following his release.)
30 June 2018	CM	(England)	Billy Clifford	Boreham Wood	Released	(Note: Billy Clifford joined Boreham Wood following his release.)
30 June 2018	CM	(Guinea-Bissau)	Kaby Djaló	Unattached	Released	
30 June 2018	CB	(Kenya)	Josh Lelan	Aldershot Town	Released	(Note: Josh Lelan joined Aldershot Town following his release.)
30 June 2018	LW	(England)	Jordan Roberts	Ipswich Town	Released	(Note: Jordan Roberts joined Ipswich Town following his release.)
30 June 2018	DM	(England)	Aryan Tajbakhsh	Dover Athletic	Released	
3 July 2018	RW	(Netherlands)	Moussa Sanoh	(Romania) CSM Politehnica Iași	Mutual consent	(Note: Moussa Sanoh joined CSM Politehnica Iași following his release.)
4 July 2018	RW	(Netherlands)	Enzio Boldewijn	Notts County	Undisclosed	
6 July 2018	CB	(Wales)	Josh Yorwerth	Peterborough United	Undisclosed	
16 July 2018	CF	(Netherlands)	Thomas Verheydt	(Netherlands) Go Ahead Eagles	Undisclosed	
14 January 2019	CM	(England)	Robert Milsom	Notts County	Free transfer	
22 January 2019	DM	(France)	Romain Vincelot	Shrewsbury Town	Undisclosed	
31 January 2019	CB	(Republic of Ireland)	Mark Connolly	(Scotland) Dundee United	Undisclosed	
5 February 2019	CM	(England)	Mark Randall	Free agent	Mutual consent	

=== Loans in ===
Date from	Position	Nationality	Name	From	Date until	Ref.
31 August 2018	LW	(Malta)	Luke Gambin	Luton Town	31 May 2019	
31 August 2018	LB	(England)	Joe Maguire	Fleetwood Town	31 May 2019	
31 January 2019	CM	(England)	Matty Willock	Manchester United	31 May 2019	

=== Loans out ===
Date from	Position	Nationality	Name	To	Date until	Ref.
31 August 2018	CM	(England)	Robert Milsom	Notts County	31 December 2018	
17 November 2018	CF	(Poland)	Brian Galach	Burgess Hill Town	17 December 2018	
8 January 2019	RM	(England)	Tarryn Allarakhia	Wealdstone	5 February 2019	

== Pre-season ==
Crawley Town announced friendlies with Fulham, Ipswich Town, Charlton Athletic.

7 July 2018 Friendly	Fulham	4–2	Crawley Town	New Malden
12:30 BST	Käit 23'; Ayité 49'; Djaló 58'; Kebano 72'	Report	Palmer 9'; Verheydt 73'	Stadium: Motspur Park

12 July 2018 Friendly	Norwich City	2–0	Crawley Town	Norwich
16:30 BST	Srbeny 71'; Stiepermann 79'	Report		Stadium: Colney Training Centre

17 July 2018 Friendly	Crawley Town	0–1	Ipswich Town	East Grinstead
19:30 BST		Report	Ward 5'	Stadium: East Court; Attendance: 475

20 July 2018 Friendly	Brighton & Hove Albion	3–0	Crawley Town	Lancing
11:00 BST	Bernardo 26'; Tomer Hemed 32'; Markus Suttner 48'	Report		Stadium: AMEX Training Centre

21 July 2018 Friendly	Crawley Town	0–2	Charlton Athletic	East Grinstead
15:00 BST		Report	Aribo 8'; Ahearne-Grant 62'	Stadium: East Court; Attendance: 450; Referee: Gavin Ward

28 July 2018 Friendly	Crawley Town	1–1	Roeselare	Crawley
15:00 BST	Palmer 66'	Report	Abraw 90'	Stadium: Broadfield Stadium; Attendance: 1,481

== Competitions ==
=== League Two ===
==== League table ====
Pos	Team	Pld	W	D	L	GF	GA	GD	Pts
17	Grimsby Town	46	16	8	22	45	56	−11	56
18	Morecambe	46	14	12	20	54	70	−16	54
19	Crawley Town	46	15	8	23	51	68	−17	53
20	Port Vale	46	12	13	21	39	55	−16	49
21	Cambridge United	46	12	11	23	40	66	−26	47

Source: EFL Official Website
Rules for classification: 1) Points; 2) Goal difference; 3) Number of goals scored; 4) Head-to-head results

==== Results summary ====
Overall								Home						Away					
Pld	W	D	L	GF	GA	GD	Pts	W	D	L	GF	GA	GD	W	D	L	GF	GA	GD
46	15	8	23	51	68	−17	53	10	5	8	34	31	+3	5	3	15	17	37	−20

Last updated: 4 May 2019.

==== Results by matchday ====
Matchday	1	2	3	4	5	6	7	8	9	10	11	12	13	14	15	16	17	18	19	20	21	22	23	24	25	26	27	28	29	30	31	32	33	34	35	36	37	38	39	40	41	42	43	44	45	46
Ground	A	H	A	H	H	A	A	H	A	H	A	H	A	H	H	A	H	A	H	H	A	H	A	A	H	H	A	A	H	A	A	H	A	H	A	H	H	A	H	A	H	A	A	H	A	H
Result	W	L	L	D	W	L	W	W	L	W	L	W	L	W	D	L	L	L	W	L	L	L	L	D	W	W	L	L	L	W	D	L	D	D	L	W	D	L	L	L	L	W	W	D	L	W
Position	9	13	19	18	14	16	15	10	15	10	12	9	10	8	9	10	12	13	12	16	16	17	18	18	17	15	17	17	17	16	16	17	17	18	18	18	18	18	18	20	21	20	18	19	19	19

Updated to match(es) played on 4 May 2019. Source: Statto.com
A = Away; H = Home; W = Win; D = Draw; L = Loss

==== Matches ====
Win Draw Loss

The fixtures for the 2018–19 season were announced on 21 June 2018 at 9am.

4 August 2018 1	Cheltenham Town	0–1	Crawley Town	Cheltenham
15:00 BST	Flinders (yellow card) 36'	Report	Palmer 63'	Stadium: Whaddon Road; Attendance: 2,719; Referee: Thomas Bramall

11 August 2018 2	Crawley Town	1–3	Stevenage	Crawley
15:00 BST	Palmer 53'	Report	Reid 48'; Revell 88', 90+5'	Stadium: Broadfield Stadium; Attendance: 2,102; Referee: Peter Wright

18 August 2018 3	Port Vale	1–0	Crawley Town	Stoke-on-Trent
15:00 BST	Hannant 20'; Worrall (yellow card) 61'	Report	Vincelot (yellow card) 57'; Morais (yellow card) 90+6'	Stadium: Vale Park; Attendance: 4,159; Referee: Paul Marsden

21 August 2018 4	Crawley Town	2–2	Swindon Town	Crawley
19:45 BST	Doherty (yellow card) 27'; Palmer 51', 90+9'; Payne (red card) 90+6'	Report	Dunne 13', (red card) 53'; Anderson 37'; Diagouraga (red card) 51'; Nelson (yellow card) 77'; Doughty (yellow card) 90'	Stadium: Broadfield Stadium; Attendance: 2,050; Referee: Charles Breakspear

25 August 2018 5	Crawley Town	3–2	Bury	Crawley
15:00 BST	Smith 4'; Camará 81'; Connolly (yellow card) 87'; Palmer 88'	Report	Dagnall (yellow card) 45+2', (goal) 56'; Mayor 78', (yellow card) 79'; Adams (yellow card) 81'	Stadium: Broadfield Stadium; Attendance: 2,036; Referee: Craig Hicks

1 September 2018 6	Oldham Athletic	2–1	Crawley Town	Oldham
15:00 BST	Nepomuceno 8'; Edmundson (yellow card) 78'; Baxter (yellow card) 85'; Surridge 89'	Report	Bulman 22'; Connolly (yellow card) 76'; Morais (yellow card) 79'	Stadium: Boundary Park; Attendance: 4,160; Referee: Michael Salisbury

8 September 2018 7	Lincoln City	0–1	Crawley Town	Lincoln
15:00 BST	Frecklington (red card) 55'; Bostwick (yellow card) 75'	Report	N'Gala (yellow card) 12'; Bulman (yellow card) 22'; Bostwick 45' (og.); Maguire (yellow card) 46'; Connolly (yellow card) 68'; Palmer (yellow card) 90+2'	Stadium: Sincil Bank; Attendance: 8,321; Referee: Matt Donohue

15 September 2018 8	Crawley Town	2–0	Morecambe	Crawley
15:00 BST	Bulman (yellow card) 28'; Connolly (yellow card) 35'; Nathaniel-George 52'; Camará 55', (yellow card) 88'	Report	Yarney (yellow card) 23'; Piggott (yellow card) 50'; Cranston (yellow card) 79'	Stadium: Broadfield Stadium; Attendance: 1,895; Referee: Allan Young

22 September 2018 9	Forest Green Rovers	1–0	Crawley Town	Nailsworth
15:00 BST	Campbell (yellow card) 62'; Reid 70'; Mills (yellow card) 73'; Brown (yellow card) 85'	Report	Connolly (yellow card) 3'; Camará (yellow card) 28'; Palmer (yellow card) 83'; McNerney (yellow card) 85' (yellow-red card)	Stadium: The New Lawn; Attendance: 2,089; Referee: Tom Nield

29 September 2018 10	Crawley Town	3–1	Yeovil Town	Crawley
15:00 BST	Palmer 25', (yellow card) 85'; Maguire (yellow card) 29'; Randall (yellow card) 33'; Nathaniel-George 68'; Morais 90+4'	Report	D'Almeida (yellow card) 32'; Dickinson 42'	Stadium: Broadfield Stadium; Attendance: 2,142; Referee: Neil Hair

2 October 2018 11	Notts County	3–1	Crawley Town	Nottingham
19:45 BST	Hemmings 9'; Stead 33'; Milsom (red card) 66'; Thomas 87'; Ward (yellow card) 89'	Report	Payne (yellow card) 61'; Vincelot (yellow card) 85'; Palmer (yellow card) 90'; Poleon 90+3'	Stadium: Meadow Lane; Attendance: 5,098; Referee: David Webb

6 October 2018 12	Crawley Town	2–0	Cambridge United	Crawley
15:00 BST	Payne (yellow card) 26'; Gambin 71'; Palmer 77'	Report	Lambe (yellow card) 26'; Maris (yellow card) 64'	Stadium: Broadfield Stadium; Attendance: 2,151; Referee: Gavin Ward

13 October 2018 13	Colchester United	3–1	Crawley Town	Colchester
15:00 BST	Szmodics 27', (yellow card) 34'; Eastman (yellow card) 40'; Nouble 57'; Vincent-Young (yellow card) 76'; Norris 90'	Report	Morais 40' (pen.), (yellow card) 43'; Connolly (yellow card) 45+1'; Payne (yellow card) 59'; N'Gala (red card) 90+6'	Stadium: Colchester Community Stadium; Attendance: 3,208; Referee: Trevor Kettle

20 October 2018 14	Crawley Town	4–1	Newport County	Crawley
15:00 BST	Maguire 1'; Payne (yellow card) 51'; Connolly (yellow card) 53'; Morais 64' (pen.), (yellow card) 64'; Palmer 72'; Nathaniel-George 79'; Francomb (yellow card) 85'	Report	Matt 59'; Butler (yellow card) 67'; Franks (red card) 82'	Stadium: Broadfield Stadium; Attendance: 2,157; Referee: Craig Breakspear

23 October 2018 15	Crawley Town	1–1	Exeter City	Crawley
19:45 BST	Gambin (yellow card) 7'; Vincelot (yellow card) 41'; Morais 61'; Payne (yellow card) 80'; Nathaniel-George (yellow card) 83'	Report	Tillson (yellow card) 50'; Holmes 79'; Taylor (yellow card) 82'	Stadium: Broadfield Stadium; Attendance: 2,095; Referee: John Busby

27 October 2018 16	Tranmere Rovers	5–1	Crawley Town	Birkenhead
15:00 BST	Jennings 25'; Norwood 43', 54'; Buxton 58' (pen.); Mullin 60'	Report	Francomb (yellow card) 18'; Palmer 65'	Stadium: Prenton Park; Attendance: 5,445; Referee: Tom Nield

3 November 2018 17	Crawley Town	0–4	Milton Keynes Dons	Crawley
15:00 GMT	Vincelot (yellow card) 64'	Report	Healey 7', 45+1'; Agard 18'; Aneke 63'	Stadium: Broadfield Stadium; Attendance: 2,667; Referee: Anthony Coggins

17 November 2018 18	Grimsby Town	1–0	Crawley Town	Cleethorpes
15:00 GMT	Rose 86'	Report		Stadium: Blundell Park; Attendance: 4,459; Referee: Andy Haines

24 November 2018 19	Crawley Town	3–0	Crewe Alexandra	Crawley
15:00 GMT	Payne 15' (pen.); McNerney 81'; Bulman 90+5'	Report		Stadium: Broadfield Stadium; Attendance: 1,734; Referee: Lee Collins

8 December 2018 20	Crawley Town	0–1	Northampton Town	Crawley
15:00 GMT	Palmer (red card) 55'	Report	van Veen 53' (pen.)	Stadium: Broadfield Stadium; Attendance: 2,389; Referee: Craig Hicks

15 December 2018 21	Macclesfield Town	2–0	Crawley Town	Macclesfield
15:00 GMT	Durrell 31'; Smith 85'	Report	Maguire (yellow card) 19'	Stadium: Moss Rose; Attendance: 1,362; Referee: Kevin Johnson

22 December 2018 22	Crawley Town	2–3	Carlisle United	Crawley
15:00 GMT	Poleon 8', 40'; Francomb (yellow card) 37'; Payne (yellow card) 57'; McNerney (yellow card) 62'	Report	Yates (yellow card) 12' (goal) 14'; Grainger 37' (pen.); Sowerby 56'	Stadium: Broadfield Stadium; Attendance: 2,176; Referee: Nick Kinseley

26 December 2018 23	Cambridge United	2–1	Crawley Town	Cambridge
13:00 GMT	Maris 27' (yellow card) 32'; Deegan (yellow card) 38'; Ibehre 88'	Report	Poleon 16'; Bulman (yellow card) 80'; McNerney (yellow card) 86'	Stadium: Abbey Stadium; Attendance: 4,601; Referee: Neil Hair

29 December 2018 24	Newport County	0–0	Crawley Town	Newport
15:00 GMT	Harris (yellow card) 88'	Report		Stadium: Rodney Parade; Attendance: 3,166; Referee: Antony Coggins

1 January 2019 25	Crawley Town	2–0	Colchester United	Crawley
15:00 GMT	McNerney (red card) 32'; Connolly (yellow card) 45+1'; Gambin 60', 90'	Report	Kent (yellow card) 49' (yellow-red card) 89'	Stadium: Broadfield Stadium; Attendance: 2,765; Referee: Andy Davies

5 January 2019 26	Crawley Town	1–0	Cheltenham Town	Crawley
15:00 GMT	Palmer 39' (pen.)	Report		Stadium: Broadfield Stadium; Attendance: 2,623; Referee: Chris Sarginson

12 January 2019 27	Stevenage	2–1	Crawley Town	Stevenage
15:00 GMT	Ball 24', 40'	Report	Poleon 36'; Payne (yellow card) 42'	Stadium: Broadhall Way; Attendance: 2,347; Referee: Thomas Bramall

15 January 2019 28	Mansfield Town	1–0	Crawley Town	Mansfield
19:45 GMT	Grant (yellow card) 42'; Bishop (yellow card) 64'; Walker 88'	Report	Dallison (yellow card) 30'; Young (yellow card) 36'; Payne (yellow card) 45+4'; Connolly (yellow card) 74'; Francomb (yellow card) 82'	Stadium: Field Mill; Attendance: 3,739; Referee: Martin Coy

19 January 2019 29	Crawley Town	0–1	Port Vale	Crawley
15:00 GMT	Gambin (yellow card) 81'	Report	Miller 27' (yellow card) 75'; Conlon (yellow card) 89'	Stadium: Broadfield Stadium; Attendance: 2,089; Referee: Dean Whitestone

26 January 2019 30	Swindon Town	0–1	Crawley Town	Swindon
15:00 GMT	Anderson (penalty missed) 90'	Report	Sesay (yellow card) 40'; Camará (yellow card) 42'; Morais 45+1'; McNerney (yellow card) 80'	Stadium: County Ground; Attendance: 6,026; Referee: Lee Swabey

2 February 2019 31	Bury	1–1	Crawley Town	Bury
15:00 GMT	Maynard 83'	Report	Dallison (yellow card) 43'; Palmer 87'	Stadium: Gigg Lane; Attendance: 3,625; Referee: Neil Hair

9 February 2019 32	Crawley Town	0–3	Oldham Athletic	Crawley
15:00 GMT	Young (yellow card) 35'; Francomb (yellow card) 73'	Report	Missilou (yellow card) 64'; Maouche (yellow card) 71'; Branger 74'; Dearnley 86'; Nepomuceno 90+4'	Stadium: Broadfield Stadium; Attendance: 2,058; Referee: John Busby

16 February 2019 33	Northampton Town	0–0	Crawley Town	Northampton
15:00 GMT	Elšnik (yellow card) 56'; Powell (yellow card) 66'; Hoskins (yellow card) 89'	Report	Poleon (yellow card) 85'	Stadium: Sixfields Stadium; Attendance: 4,581; Referee: Nick Kinseley

23 February 2019 34	Crawley Town	1–1	Macclesfield Town	Crawley
15:00 GMT	Willock (yellow card) 54'; Sesay (yellow card) 57'; Dallison (yellow card) 65'; Young 84'; McNerney (yellow card) 86'	Report	Smith 40'; Rose (yellow card) 45+2'; Demetriou (yellow card) 50'; Wilson (yellow card) 66'	Stadium: Broadfield Stadium; Attendance: 2,190; Referee: Alan Young

2 March 2019 35	Milton Keynes Dons	1–0	Crawley Town	Denbigh
15:00 GMT	McGrandles (yellow card) 12'; Agard 41'; Walsh (yellow card) 80'	Report		Stadium: Stadium mk Attendance: 6,889; Referee: Thomas Bramall

9 March 2019 36	Crawley Town	2–1	Grimsby Town	Crawley
15:00 GMT	Palmer (yellow card) 21' (goal) 26', 40'	Report	Thomas 6'; Woolford (yellow card) 15'; Embleton (yellow card) 70'; Öhman (yellow card) 79'	Stadium: Broadfield Stadium; Attendance: 2,043; Referee: Brett Huxtable

12 March 2019 37	Crawley Town	0–0	Mansfield Town	Crawley
19:45 GMT	Francomb (yellow card) 85'; Willock (yellow card) 90+4'	Report	Turner (yellow card) 48'	Stadium: Broadfield Stadium; Attendance: 1,909; Referee: Lee Collins

16 March 2019 38	Crewe Alexandra	6–1	Crawley Town	Crewe
15:00 GMT	Bowery 36'; Dallison 38' (o.g.); Porter 42'; Green 43'; Kirk 47'; Hunt (yellow card) 79'; Dale 83'	Report	Palmer 13' (pen.); Meite (red card) 80'	Stadium: Gresty Road; Attendance: 3,220; Referee: Sebastian Stockbridge

23 March 2019 39	Crawley Town	0–3	Lincoln City	Crawley
15:00 GMT	Dallison (yellow card) 39'	Report	Andrade 37'; McCartan 76'; Bolger 85'	Stadium: Broadfield Stadium; Attendance: 3,335; Referee: Craig Hicks

30 March 2019 40	Morecambe	1–0	Crawley Town	Morecambe
15:00 GMT	Mandeville 82'	Report	McNerney (yellow card) 66'	Stadium: Globe Arena; Attendance: 2,445; Referee: Eddie Ilderton

6 April 2019 41	Crawley Town	1–2	Forest Green Rovers	Crawley
15:00 BST	Bulman 24'; Morais (yellow card) 65'; McNerney (yellow card) 85'	Report	Doidge (yellow card) 23' (goal) 34', 88'	Stadium: Broadfield Stadium; Attendance: 2,088; Referee: Darren Drysdale

13 April 2019 42	Yeovil Town	0–1	Crawley Town	Yeovil
15:00 BST	Warren (yellow card) 39'; Ojo (yellow card) 58'; D'Almeida (yellow card) 90+1'	Report	Morais (yellow card) 60' (goal) 72'; Nathaniel-George (yellow card) 63'; Young (yellow card) 79'	Stadium: Huish Park; Attendance: 3,232; Referee: Ben Toner

19 April 2019 43	Exeter City	1–3	Crawley Town	Exeter
13:00 BST	Bowman 50'; Sweeney (yellow card) 80'	Report	Morais 26'; Grego-Cox 34', 60'; Sesay (yellow card) 38'; Bulman (yellow card) 59'; McNerney (yellow card) 73'; Maguire (yellow card) 80'	Stadium: St James Park; Attendance: 5,054; Referee: Thomas Bramall

22 April 2019 44	Crawley Town	1–1	Notts County	Crawley
15:00 BST	Nathaniel-George 19'	Report	Mackail-Smith 8'; Milsom (yellow card) 45'; Barclay (red card) 54'	Stadium: Broadfield Stadium; Attendance: 2,800; Referee: Graham Salisbury

27 April 2019 45	Carlisle United	4–2	Crawley Town	Carlisle
15:00 BST	Thomas 7', 9'; O'Hare 20'; Hope 31'	Report	McNerney (yellow card) 21'; Nathaniel-George 44'; Gerrard 77' (og.); Dallison (yellow card) 90+3'	Stadium: Brunton Park; Attendance: 4,514; Referee: Scott Oldham

4 May 2019 46	Crawley Town	3–1	Tranmere Rovers	Crawley
15:00 BST	Nathaniel-George 36'; Morais 42'; Camará 90+2'	Report	Norwood 50' (pen.); Buxton (yellow card) 76'	Stadium: Broadfield Stadium; Attendance: 3,183; Referee: Andy Haines

=== FA Cup ===
The first round draw was made live on BBC by Dennis Wise and Dion Dublin on 22 October.

10 November 2018 First round	Southend United	1–1	Crawley Town	Southend-on-Sea
15:00 GMT	Kightly 9'	Report	White 85' (o.g.)	Stadium: Roots Hall; Attendance: 3,935; Referee: Scott Oldham

20 November 2018 First round replay	Crawley Town	2–6 (a.e.t.)	Southend United	Crawley
19:45 GMT	Palmer 55', 68'	Report	Doherty 17' (o.g.); Bunn 31'; Cox 92'; White 97'; Mantom 106'; McLaughlin 114'	Stadium: Broadfield Stadium; Attendance: 3,120; Referee: Charles Breakspear

=== EFL Cup ===
On 15 June 2018, the draw for the first round was made in Vietnam.

14 August 2018 First round	Bristol Rovers	2–1	Crawley Town	Bristol
19:45 BST	Bennett 32'; Payne (yellow card) 56'; Clarke (yellow card) 67', (goal) 84'; Smith (yellow card) 90+4'	Report	Randall (yellow card) 40'; Connolly 88'; Poleon (yellow card) 85' (yellow-red card) 90+4'	Stadium: Memorial Stadium; Attendance: 2,336; Referee: Lee Swabey

=== EFL Trophy ===
On 13 July 2018, the initial group stage draw bar the U21 invited clubs was announced.

Pos	Lge	Team	Pld	W	PW	PL	L	GF	GA	GD	Pts	Qualification
1	L1	Portsmouth	3	3	0	0	0	8	2	+6	9	Round 2
2	ACA	Tottenham Hotspur U21	3	1	0	1	1	7	4	+3	4	Round 2
3	L1	Gillingham	3	1	0	0	2	2	9	−7	3	
4	L2	Crawley Town	3	0	1	0	2	2	4	−2	2	

Source: EFL.com

4 September 2018 Group stages	Crawley Town	1–1 (5–3 p)	Tottenham Hotspur U23s	Crawley
20:00 BST	N'Gala 59'; Randall (yellow card) 85'	Report	Harrison 49'	Stadium: Broadfield Stadium; Attendance: 1,403; Referee: Tim Robinson
	Penalties
	Young (penalty scored); Poleon (penalty scored); Randall (penalty scored); Palmer (penalty scored); Sesay (penalty scored)		Binks (penalty scored); Roles (penalty scored); Bowden (penalty scored); Maghoma (penalty missed)

9 October 2018 Group stages	Crawley Town	0–1	Portsmouth	Crawley
19:45 BST	Vincelot (yellow card) 43'; Randall (yellow card) 69'	Report	Donohue 37'	Stadium: Broadfield Stadium; Attendance: 1,268; Referee: Gavin Ward

13 November 2018 Group stages	Gillingham	2–1	Crawley Town	Gillingham
19:45 GMT	List 59'; Stevenson 88'	Report	Poleon 18'	Stadium: Priestfield Stadium

== Statistics ==
=== Appearances ===
Players included in matchday squads
No.	Pos.	Nat.	Name	League Two		FA Cup		EFL Cup		EFL Trophy		Total		Discipline	
No.	Pos.	Nat.	Name	Apps	Goals	Apps	Goals	Apps	Goals	Apps	Goals	Apps	Goals	A yellow rectangle, denoting the yellow penalty card shown to a player being cautioned	A red rectangle, denoting the red penalty card shown to a player being sent off
1	GK	ENG	Glenn Morris	45	0	2	0	0	0	0	0	47	0	0	0
2	DF	ENG	Lewis Young	33 (4)	1	2	0	1	0	1	0	37 (4)	1	4	0
3	DF	NIR	Josh Doherty	12 (6)	0	1	0	1	0	2	0	16 (6)	0	2	0
4	MF	ENG	Josh Payne	24 (3)	1	2	0	0	0	0	0	26 (3)	1	11	1
5	DF	ENG	Joe McNerney	25 (3)	1	1	0	0	0	3	0	29 (3)	1	10	2
7	MF	IRL	Reece Grego-Cox	14 (13)	2	0 (2)	0	1	0	1	0	16 (15)	2	0	0
8	MF	ENG	Jimmy Smith	3	1	0	0	0	0	0	0	3	1	0	0
9	FW	ENG	Ollie Palmer	39	14	2	2	0	0	0 (1)	0	41 (1)	16	7	1
10	FW	ENG	Dominic Poleon	21 (9)	5	0 (1)	0	0 (1)	0	3	1	24 (11)	6	2	1
11	MF	MLT	Luke Gambin	21 (5)	3	2	0	0	0	0	0	23 (5)	3	2	0
12	GK	TUR	Yusuf Mersin	0	0	0	0	1	0	3	0	4	0	0	0
13	FW	ENG	Ricky German	0 (4)	0	0	0	0	0	0	0	0 (4)	0	0	0
14	MF	ENG	George Francomb	38 (2)	0	2	0	1	0	2	0	43 (2)	0	7	0
15	MF	ENG	Ashley Nathaniel-George	14 (15)	5	0 (2)	0	0 (1)	0	2	0	16 (18)	5	2	0
16	DF	ENG	Joe Maguire	24 (3)	1	1	0	0	0	1 (1)	0	26 (4)	1	6	0
17	DF	ENG	Tom Dallison	18	0	0	0	0	0	0	0	18	0	5	0
18	MF	ENG	David Sesay	15 (2)	0	0	0	0	0	1 (2)	0	16 (4)	0	3	0
19	MF	ENG	Matty Willock	6 (4)	0	0	0	0	0	0	0	6 (4)	0	2	0
21	MF	ENG	Dannie Bulman	29 (7)	3	0	0	0 (1)	0	3	0	32 (8)	3	4	0
22	MF	POR	Filipe Morais	30 (3)	7	2	0	0	0	0	0	32 (3)	7	6	0
26	FW	POL	Brian Galach	0	0	0	0	0	0	1 (1)	0	1 (1)	0	0	0
28	FW	GNB	Panutche Camará	33 (11)	2	2	0	1	0	2	0	38 (11)	2	5	0
29	FW	ENG	Ibrahim Meite	0 (2)	0	0	0	0	0	0	0	0 (2)	0	0	1
33	DF	ENG	Bondz N'Gala	12 (1)	0	1	0	0	0	2	1	15 (1)	1	1	1
Players who left the club in August/January transfer window or on loan
6	DF	IRL	Mark Connolly	23	0	2	0	1	1	0	0	26	1	10	0
20	DF	FRA	Romain Vincelot	12	0	0	0	1	0	2	0	15	0	6	0
24	MF	ENG	Robert Milsom	2 (1)	0	0	0	1	0	0	0	3 (1)	0	0	0
25	MF	ENG	Mark Randall	2 (4)	0	0	0	1	0	1 (2)	0	4 (6)	0	4	0
27	FW	ENG	Tarryn Allarakhia	0 (5)	0	0	0	1	0	3	0	4 (5)	0	0	0

Last updated: 27 April 2019.
Source: Crawley Town F.C.

=== Clean sheets ===
The list is sorted by shirt number when total appearances are equal.

Rnk	No.	Player	League Two	FA Cup	EFL Cup	EFL Trophy	Total
1	1	(England) Glenn Morris	4	0	0	0	4
2	12	(Turkey) Yusuf Mersin	0	0	0	0	0
Total			4	0	0	0	4

Last updated: 6 October 2018.
Source: Crawley Town F.C.
