= Joe Maguire =

English footballer (born 1996)

Personal information
- Full name: Joseph Daniel Patrick Maguire
- Date of birth: 18 January 1996 (age 30)
- Place of birth: Manchester, England
- Height: 5 ft 10 in (1.79 m)
- Position: Left-back

Team information
- Current team: Bury

Youth career
- –2015: Liverpool

Senior career*
| Years | Team | Apps | (Gls) |
| 2015–2017 | Liverpool | 0 | (0) |
| 2015 | → Leyton Orient (loan) | 0 | (0) |
| 2017–2019 | Fleetwood Town | 5 | (0) |
| 2018–2019 | → Crawley Town (loan) | 27 | (1) |
| 2019–2021 | Accrington Stanley | 16 | (0) |
| 2021–2022 | Tranmere Rovers | 1 | (0) |
| 2024 | Bury | 1 | (0) |
- * Club domestic league appearances and goals as of 11:19, 2 April 2024 (UTC)

Joseph Daniel Patrick Maguire (born 18 January 1996) is an English former professional footballer who plays as a left-back, for Northern Premier League Premier Division club Bury. He has played in the English Football League for Fleetwood Town and Crawley Town.

== Career ==
=== Liverpool ===
Maguire was born in Manchester, Greater Manchester. joined the Liverpool academy at under-nine level, coming from Swinton Boys. After progressing through the academy ranks he travelled with the Liverpool first team on their 2015 pre-season tour and made a number of appearances in friendly matches. Maguire joined League Two club Leyton Orient on 28 August 2015 on a one-month loan deal. He made his first-team debut four days later on 1 September, playing 90 minutes for Leyton Orient in a 2–1 Football League Trophy loss away to Luton Town.

On 8 January 2016, he was named in the Liverpool first-team as a substitute in an FA Cup third-round match away to Exeter City. He was subsequently brought on in the 76th minute to make his Liverpool debut, with the match finishing a 2–2 draw.

=== Fleetwood Town ===
Maguire signed for League One club Fleetwood Town on 13 January 2017 on a two-and-a-half-year contract.

He joined League Two club Crawley Town on 31 August 2018 on loan until 1 January 2019. On 3 January 2019, Maguire extended his loan until the end of the 2018–19 season.

=== Accrington Stanley ===
Maguire signed for League One club Accrington Stanley on 15 July 2019 on a one-year contract with the option of a further year. On 14 May 2021 Maguire was released.

=== Tranmere Rovers ===
On 6 July 2021, Maguire joined League Two side Tranmere Rovers on a one-year deal. He was released by the club at the end of his contract.

Maguire retired at the end of the 2022-2023 season and is now a painter and pilot.

=== Bury ===
In March 2024, Maguire came out of retirement to join North West Counties Premier Division club Bury.

== Career statistics ==
As of end of 2021–22 season

Appearances and goals by club, season and competition
| Club | Season | League | | | FA Cup | | EFL Cup | | Other | | Total | |
| Club | Season | Division | Apps | Goals | Apps | Goals | Apps | Goals | Apps | Goals | Apps | Goals |
|---|---|---|---|---|---|---|---|---|---|---|---|---|
| Liverpool | 2015–16 | Premier League | 0 | 0 | 1 | 0 | 0 | 0 | 0 | 0 | 1 | 0 |
| Liverpool | 2016–17 | Premier League | 0 | 0 | 0 | 0 | 0 | 0 | — | | 0 | 0 |
| Liverpool | Total | | 0 | 0 | 1 | 0 | 0 | 0 | 0 | 0 | 1 | 0 |
| Leyton Orient (loan) | 2015–16 | League Two | 0 | 0 | — | | — | | 1 (Note: Appearance in Football League Trophy) | 0 | 1 | 0 |
| Fleetwood Town | 2016–17 | League One | 3 | 0 | 0 | 0 | — | | 0 | 0 | 3 | 0 |
| Fleetwood Town | 2017–18 | League One | 2 | 0 | 0 | 0 | 1 | 0 | 5 (Note: Appearance(s) in EFL Trophy) | 0 | 8 | 0 |
| Fleetwood Town | 2018–19 | League One | 0 | 0 | — | | 1 | 0 | — | | 1 | 0 |
| Fleetwood Town | Total | | 5 | 0 | 0 | 0 | 2 | 0 | 5 | 0 | 12 | 0 |
| Crawley Town (loan) | 2018–19 | League Two | 27 | 1 | 1 | 0 | — | | 2 | 0 | 30 | 1 |
| Accrington Stanley | 2019–20 | League One | 11 | 0 | 0 | 0 | 1 | 0 | 1 | 0 | 13 | 0 |
| Accrington Stanley | 2020–21 | League One | 5 | 0 | 0 | 0 | 0 | 0 | 2 | 0 | 7 | 0 |
| Accrington Stanley | Total | | 16 | 0 | 0 | 0 | 1 | 0 | 3 | 0 | 20 | 0 |
| Tranmere Rovers | 2021–22 | League Two | 1 | 0 | 0 | 0 | 1 | 0 | 4 | 0 | 6 | 0 |
| Career total | | | 49 | 1 | 2 | 0 | 4 | 0 | 15 | 0 | 70 | 1 |
