= 2021–22 Tranmere Rovers F.C. season =

Tranmere Rovers
2021–22 season
- Chairman: Mark Palios
- Manager: Micky Mellon
- Stadium: Prenton Park
- League Two: 9th
- FA Cup: Second round
- EFL Cup: First round
- EFL Trophy: Round of 32
- Top goalscorer: League: Elliott Nevitt (6); All: Elliott Nevitt (7)
Home colours	Away colours

The 2021–22 season is Tranmere Rovers's 138th year in their history and second consecutive season in League Two. Along with the league, the club are also competing in the FA Cup, the EFL Cup and the 2021–22 EFL Trophy. The season covers the period from 1 July 2021 to 30 June 2022.

During pre-season, Micky Mellon returned to the club as he was announced as the new manager.

== Pre-season friendlies ==
Tranmere Rovers announced they would have a friendly against Rangers, Stalybridge Celtic, Warrington Town and Sunderland as part of their pre-season preparations.

10 July 2021 Friendly	Tranmere Rovers	1–0	Rangers	Birkenhead
12:00 BST	Morris 34'	Report		Stadium: Prenton Park

20 July 2021 Friendly	Stalybridge Celtic	1–3	Tranmere Rovers	Stalybridge
19:15 BST	Bakkor 80' (pen.)	Report	McManaman 2'; Dieseruvwe 40'; Morris 83'	Stadium: Bower Fold

24 July 2021 Friendly	Warrington Town	0–1	Tranmere Rovers	Warrington
15:00 BST		Report	Dieseruvwe 37' (pen.)	Stadium: Cantilever Park

27 July 2021 Friendly	Tranmere Rovers	0–0	Sunderland	Birkenhead
19:00 BST		Report		Stadium: Prenton Park

31 July 2021 Friendly	Tranmere Rovers	1–2	Burnley	Birkenhead
15:00 BST	Knight-Percival 57'	Report	Barnes 70'; McNeil 87'	Stadium: Prenton Park

== Competitions ==
=== League Two ===
==== League table ====
Pos	Team	Pld	W	D	L	GF	GA	GD	Pts	Promotion, qualification or relegation
6	Swindon Town	46	22	11	13	77	54	+23	77	Qualification for League Two play-offs
7	Mansfield Town	46	22	11	13	67	52	+15	77	Qualification for League Two play-offs
8	Sutton United	46	22	10	14	69	53	+16	76	
9	Tranmere Rovers	46	21	12	13	53	40	+13	75	
10	Salford City	46	19	13	14	60	46	+14	70	
11	Newport County	46	19	12	15	67	58	+9	69	
12	Crawley Town	46	17	10	19	56	66	−10	61	

Source: EFL Official Website
Rules for classification: 1) Points; 2) Goal difference; 3) Number of goals scored; 4) Head-to-head results; 5) Wins; 6) Away goals; 7) Penalty points (sec 9.5); 8) 12-point sending off offences

==== Results summary ====
Overall								Home						Away					
Pld	W	D	L	GF	GA	GD	Pts	W	D	L	GF	GA	GD	W	D	L	GF	GA	GD
46	21	12	13	53	40	+13	75	16	3	4	36	15	+21	5	9	9	17	25	−8

Last updated: 7 May 2022
Source:.

==== Results by matchday ====
Matchday	1	2	3	4	5	6	7	8	9	10	11	12	13	14	15	16	17	18	19	20	21	22	23	24	25	26	27	28	29	30	31	32	33	34	35	36	37	38	39	40	41	42	43	44	45	46
Ground	H	A	A	H	A	H	A	H	A	H	H	A	A	H	A	H	A	H	A	A	H	H	H	A	H	A	H	H	A	H	A	A	H	A	A	H	H	A	A	H	H	A	H	A	H	A
Result	W	D	D	L	L	W	L	W	D	W	W	W	D	L	L	L	D	W	W	W	W	W	W	D	W	W	L	W	D	W	L	L	D	L	L	W	W	D	L	D	D	D	W	L	W	W
Position	9	8	7	14	19	11	15	11	13	9	5	4	5	8	11	12	11	10	10	8	5	4	2	2	2	2	2	2	2	2	2	2	2	3	6	4	4	5	7	7	9	9	7	9	9	9

Updated to match(es) played on 7 May 2022. Source: Statto.com
A = Away; H = Home; W = Win; D = Draw; L = Loss

==== Matches ====
Tranmere Rovers' league fixtures were revealed on 24 June 2021.

7 August 2021 1	Tranmere Rovers	1–0	Walsall	Birkenhead
15:00 BST	McManaman (yellow card) 42' (goal) 73'; Davies (yellow card) 67'; Merrie (red card) 86'; Murphy (yellow card) 87'	Report	Taylor (yellow card) 15'; Labadie (yellow card) 90+2'	Stadium: Prenton Park; Attendance: 7,728; Referee: Carl Brook

14 August 2021 2	Port Vale	0–0	Tranmere Rovers	Burslem
15:00 BST		Report	Dieseruvwe (yellow card) 29'; Spearing (yellow card) 42'	Stadium: Vale Park; Attendance: 6,986; Referee: Andy Haines

17 August 2021 3	Swindon Town	0–0	Tranmere Rovers	Swindon
19:45 BST	McKirdy (yellow card) 53'	Report	Davies (yellow card) 50'; Knight-Percival (yellow card) 87'; Murphy (yellow card) 90+5'	Stadium: County Ground; Attendance: 8,274; Referee: John Busby

21 August 2021 4	Tranmere Rovers	0–1	Newport County	Birkenhead
15:00 BST	Dieseruvwe (yellow card) 74'; Clarke (yellow card) 89'	Report	Upson (yellow card) 26'; Fisher 60'	Stadium: Prenton Park; Attendance: 6,160; Referee: Robert Lewis

28 August 2021 5	Scunthorpe United	1–0	Tranmere Rovers	Scunthorpe
15:00 BST	Hippolyte 4' (pen.), (yellow card) 5'; Pugh (yellow card) 17'	Report	Merrie (yellow card) 58'; Knight-Percival (yellow card) 78'	Stadium: Sands Venue Stadium; Referee: Trevor Kettle

4 September 2021 6	Tranmere Rovers	1–0	Hartlepool United	Birkenhead
15:00 BST	Clarke (yellow card) 55'; Knight-Percival (yellow card) 74'; Davies 89'	Report	Sterry (yellow card) 37'; Byrne (yellow card) 55'	Stadium: Prenton Park; Attendance: 6,707; Referee: Chris Sarginson

11 September 2021 7	Rochdale	1–0	Tranmere Rovers	Rochdale
15:00 BST	Cashman 84'	Report		Stadium: Crown Oil Arena; Referee: Charles Breakspear

18 September 2021 8	Tranmere Rovers	2–0	Salford City	Birkenhead
15:00 BST	Morris 13' (pen.); Hawkes (yellow card) 41'; Spearing (red card) 45+1'; Clarke (yellow card) 45+5'; Nevitt 48'	Report	Touray (red card) 20'; Lowe (yellow card) 50'; Hunter (yellow card) 75'	Stadium: Prenton Park; Attendance: 5,854; Referee: Sam Purkiss

25 September 2021 9	Forest Green Rovers	0–0	Tranmere Rovers	Nailsworth
15:00 BST	Aitchison (yellow card) 27'; Bernard (yellow card) 76'; Hendry (yellow card) 90'	Report	Hawkes (yellow card) 8'; Foley (yellow card) 25'; MacDonald (yellow card) 80' (yellow-red card) 87'	Stadium: The innocent New Lawn; Referee: David Rock

2 October 2021 10	Tranmere Rovers	2–1	Crawley Town	Birkenhead
15:00 BST	Dacres-Cogley (yellow card) 16'; Merrie (yellow card) 20'; Clarke 28', 79'	Report	Davies (yellow card) 33'; Powell (yellow card) 43'; Appiah 64'	Stadium: Prenton Park; Attendance: 6,046; Referee: Seb Stockbridge

8 October 2021 11	Tranmere Rovers	2–0	Colchester United	Birkenhead
19:45 BST	Hawkes 54'; Clarke 71'	Report	Clampin (yellow card) 14'; Jasper (yellow card) 90+2'	Stadium: Prenton Park; Attendance: 7,324; Referee: James Oldham

16 October 2021 12	Carlisle United	0–1	Tranmere Rovers	Carlisle
15:00 BST	Clough (yellow card) 37'	Report	McDonald 48' (o.g.); Morris (penalty missed) 55'; Hawkes (yellow card) 65'; Spearing (yellow card) 90+3'	Stadium: Brunton Park; Attendance: 4,831; Referee: Andrew Kitchen

20 October 2021 13	Harrogate Town	2–2	Tranmere Rovers	Harrogate
19:45 BST	Muldoon 39' (pen.); Armstrong 51'	Report	Spearing 32' (pen.); Morris 55'; Dacres-Cogley (yellow card) 90+1'	Stadium: EnviroVent Stadium; Attendance: 2,573; Referee: Declan Bourne

23 October 2021 14	Tranmere Rovers	0–2	Northampton Town	Birkenhead
15:00 BST	Spearing (yellow card) 72'	Report	Lewis (yellow card) 43'; Etete 52'; Koiki (yellow card) 58'; Hoskins 68' (pen.), (yellow card) 86'	Stadium: Prenton Park; Referee: Tom Nield

30 October 2021 15	Mansfield Town	2–0	Tranmere Rovers	Mansfield
15:00 BST	Johnson (penalty missed) 2', 67'; Oates 18'; McLaughlin (yellow card) 55'	Report	Spearing (yellow card) 35'	Stadium: One Call Stadium; Attendance: 3,831; Referee: James Bell

13 November 2021 16	Tranmere Rovers	0–1	Sutton United	Birkenhead
15:00 GMT	Spearing (yellow card) 2'; Knight-Percival (yellow card) 89'	Report	Goodliffe (yellow card) 66'; Olaofe 71'	Stadium: Prenton Park; Referee: Will Finnie

20 November 2021 17	Bristol Rovers	2–2	Tranmere Rovers	Horfield
15:00 GMT	Grant 5'; Nicholson 22'; Kilgour (yellow card) 32'; Evans (yellow card) 63'	Report	Macdonald 25', (yellow card) 32'; Knight-Percival (yellow card) 36'; Davies (yellow card) 45+3'; Glatzel 75'	Stadium: The Memorial Stadium; Attendance: 7,165; Referee: Tom Reeves

23 November 2021 18	Tranmere Rovers	2–1	Bradford City	Birkenhead
19:45 GMT	Morris 50'; Glatzel 56'	Report	Sutton 26', (yellow card) 45'	Stadium: Prenton Park; Attendance: 5,962; Referee: Martin Coy

7 December 2021 19	Oldham Athletic	0–1	Tranmere Rovers	Oldham
19:45 GMT		Report	Jolley 90'	Stadium: Boundary Park; Attendance: 4,303; Referee: Andy Haines

11 December 2021 20	Exeter City	0–1	Tranmere Rovers	Exeter
15:00 GMT	Ray (yellow card) 72'	Report	Nevitt 17'; Jolley (yellow card) 65'; McManaman (red card)	Stadium: St James Park; Attendance: 4,850; Referee: Bobby Madley

18 December 2021 21	Tranmere Rovers	1–0	Leyton Orient	Birkenhead
15:00 GMT	Davies (yellow card) 34'; Spearing 58'	Report	Happe (yellow card) 48'; Thompson (yellow card) 67'; Sweeney (yellow card) 70'	Stadium: Prenton Park; Referee: Paul Howard

26 December 2021 22	Tranmere Rovers	2–0	Barrow	Birkenhead
15:00 GMT	Maynard 7'; Spearing (yellow card) 55'; Clarke (yellow card) 78'; Morris 87'; Nevitt (yellow card) 90+2'	Report	Brown (yellow card) 34'; Jones (yellow card) 43'; Gotts (yellow card) 47'; Taylor (yellow card) 63'	Stadium: Prenton Park; Referee: Scott Oldham

8 January 2022 23	Tranmere Rovers	4–0	Scunthorpe United	Birkenhead
15:00 GMT	Jolley 23'; Nevitt 31'; O'Connor (yellow card) 65'; Foley 75'; Watson 89'	Report	Taft (yellow card) 29'	Stadium: Prenton Park; Attendance: 6,056; Referee: Christopher Pollard

11 January 2022 24	Salford City	1–1	Tranmere Rovers	Salford
19:45 GMT	Oteh 29'; Wright (yellow card) 66'; Vassell (yellow card) 69'; Eastham (yellow card) 71'; Morris (yellow card) 77'	Report	Glatzel 70'; Davies (yellow card) 90+2'	Stadium: Peninsula Stadium; Attendance: 2,273; Referee: Ross Joyce

15 January 2022 25	Tranmere Rovers	2–0	Rochdale	Birkenhead
15:00 GMT	Jolley 3' 16' (yellow card) 48'; Doohan (yellow card) 90+2'	Report		Stadium: Prenton Park; Attendance: 7,046; Referee: Ben Toner

22 January 2022 26	Crawley Town	0–1	Tranmere Rovers	Crawley
15:00 GMT	Craig (yellow card) 72'	Report	Spearing 65', (yellow card) 86'; Hemmings (yellow card) 87'	Stadium: The People's Pension Stadium; Referee: Simon Mather

29 January 2022 27	Tranmere Rovers	0–4	Forest Green Rovers	Birkenhead
15:00 GMT	Clarke (yellow card) 90+7'	Report	Stevens 6'; Matt 42'; Moore-Taylor 53'; Hendry 70'; March (penalty missed) 90+6'	Stadium: Prenton Park; Attendance: 10,924; Referee: Lee Swabey

1 February 2022 28	Tranmere Rovers	1–0	Stevenage	Birkenhead
19:45 GMT	Morris 48'	Report	Vancooten (yellow card) 15'	Stadium: Prenton Park; Attendance: Anthony Backhouse; Referee: Lee Swabey

5 February 2022 29	Barrow	1–1	Tranmere Rovers	Barrow-in-Furness
15:00 GMT	Banks (yellow card) 12', (goal) 58' (pen.); Brown (yellow card) 55'; Glennon (yellow card) 67'	Report	Hawkes 16'; Dacres-Cogley (yellow card) 57'	Stadium: The Dune Hotel Stadium; Attendance: 3,699; Referee: Oliver Langford

8 February 2022 30	Tranmere Rovers	3–0	Swindon Town	Birkenhead
19:45 GMT	Davies (yellow card) 2'; Hemmings 6', 72' (pen.); Glatzel 58'	Report	Mitchell-Lawson (yellow card) 60'; Iandolo (yellow card) 85'	Stadium: Prenton Park; Attendance: 5,767; Referee: Simon Mather

12 February 2022 31	Walsall	1–0	Tranmere Rovers	Bescot
15:00 GMT	Kinsella (yellow card) 24'; Miller (yellow card) 28'; Wilkinson 85' (pen.)	Report	Warrington (yellow card) 47'	Stadium: Banks's Stadium; Attendance: 5,440; Referee: Sam Allison

15 February 2022 32	Hartlepool United	1–0	Tranmere Rovers	Hartlepool
19:45 GMT	Clarke 45+1' (o.g.); White (yellow card) 81'; Odusina (yellow card) 90+1'	Report	Foley (yellow card) 89'; Macdonald (yellow card) 90+3'	Stadium: Suit Direct Stadium; Attendance: 5,214; Referee: Rebecca Welch

19 February 2022 33	Tranmere Rovers	1–1	Port Vale	Birkenhead
15:00 GMT	Hawkes 50'; Morris (yellow card) 62'; Hemmings (yellow card) 83'	Report	Wilson (yellow card) 90+1'; Proctor (yellow card) 90+1', (goal) 90+4'	Stadium: Prenton Park; Attendance: 7,456; Referee: David Rock

26 February 2022 34	Newport County	4–2	Tranmere Rovers	Newport
15:00 GMT	Lewis 49'; Telford 57' (pen.), 90+1'; Azaz 87'	Report	Warrington (yellow card) 48'; MacDonald (yellow card) 53'; Dacres-Cogley 65'; Demetriou 84' (o.g.)	Stadium: Rodney Parade; Referee: Darren Drysdale

5 March 2022 35	Northampton Town	3–2	Tranmere Rovers	Sixfields
15:00 GMT	Horsfall 29', 37', (yellow card) 72'; Pinnock 66'; Lubala (yellow card) 90+3'	Report	McManaman (yellow card) 12'; McPake (yellow card) 68', (goal) 75'; Hemmings 88' (pen.); O'Connor (yellow card) 90+2'	Stadium: Sixfields Stadium; Attendance: 7,379; Referee: Steve Martin

11 March 2022 36	Tranmere Rovers	3–2	Mansfield Town	Birkenhead
19:45 GMT	Clarke 5'; Nevitt 76', 90+5'	Report	Longstaff 45+6'; Hawkins 90+1'	Stadium: Prenton Park; Attendance: 7,857; Referee: Andy Haines

15 March 2022 37	Tranmere Rovers	2–0	Harrogate Town	Birkenhead
19:45 GMT	McPake (yellow card) 18'; Warrington 49'; Clarke (yellow card) 60'; Hemmings 65' (pen.); Murphy (yellow card) 86'	Report	Armstrong (yellow card) 25' (yellow-red card) 27'; Fallowfield (yellow card) 65'	Stadium: Prenton Park; Attendance: 5,437; Referee: Darren Handley

19 March 2022 38	Sutton United	1–1	Tranmere Rovers	Sutton
15:00 GMT	Goodliffe 15'	Report	Nevitt (yellow card) 47'; Hawkes 68'	Stadium: VBS Community Stadium; Attendance: 3,366; Referee: Will Finnie

26 March 2022 39	Colchester United	1–0	Tranmere Rovers	Colchester
15:00 GMT	Skuse (yellow card) 73'; Hannant (yellow card) 82'; Tchamadeu 90+5'	Report	Foley (yellow card) 82'; Jolley (yellow card) 84'; Clarke (yellow card) 90+6'; Davies (yellow card) 90+7'	Stadium: JobServe Community Stadium; Attendance: 2,459; Referee: Carl Brook

2 April 2022 40	Tranmere Rovers	2–2	Carlisle United	Birkenhead
15:00 BST	Hemmings 15', (yellow card) 43'; Macdonald (red card) 40'; Davies (yellow card) 44'; Nevitt 76'; Dacres-Cogley (yellow card) 88'; Morris (red card) 90+1'; Murphy (yellow card) 90+1'; Clarke (yellow card) 90+2'	Report	Simeu (yellow card) 43'; Feeney (yellow card) 43'; Patrick 55'; Mellor (yellow card) 64'; Mellish (yellow card) 90+2'; Sho-Silva 90+7'	Stadium: Prenton Park; Referee: Charles Breakspear

9 April 2022 41	Tranmere Rovers	1–1	Bristol Rovers	Birkenhead
15:00 BST	Hemmings 56', (yellow card) 60'; Merrie (yellow card) 65'; Spearing (yellow card) 83'	Report	Anderson 63'	Stadium: Prenton Park; Attendance: 6,637; Referee: Marc Edwards

15 April 2022 42	Bradford City	1–1	Tranmere Rovers	Bradford
15:00 BST	Walker 19', (yellow card) 66'; Watt (yellow card) 26' (yellow-red card) 28'; Bass (yellow card) 56'	Report	Maynard (yellow card) 67'; Foley (yellow card) 73'; Clarke (yellow card) 84'; McManaman 89'	Stadium: Utilita Energy Stadium; Attendance: 17,257; Referee: Carl Boyeson

18 April 2022 43	Tranmere Rovers	2–0	Exeter City	Birkenhead
15:00 BST	Davies (yellow card) 30'; Hawkes 39'; Nevitt (yellow card) 75', (goal) 81'	Report	Diabate (yellow card) 57'; Zanzala (yellow card) 70'	Stadium: Prenton Park; Attendance: 6,666; Referee: Darren Drysdale

23 April 2022 44	Stevenage	2–0	Tranmere Rovers	Stevenage
15:00 BST	Norris 23' (pen.), 67'; Reid (yellow card) 55'; Coker (yellow card) 65'	Report	Spearing (yellow card) 73'	Stadium: Lamex Stadium; Attendance: 2,969; Referee: Keith Stroud

30 April 2022 45	Tranmere Rovers	2–0	Oldham Athletic	Birkenhead
15:00 BST	Hawkes 27'; Warrington (yellow card) 57'; Hemmings 62'; O'Connor (yellow card) 68'	Report		Stadium: Prenton Park; Referee: Neil Hair

7 May 2022 46	Leyton Orient	0–1	Tranmere Rovers	Leyton
15:00 BST	Archibald (yellow card) 78'	Report	O'Connor (yellow card) 29'; Hemmings 37', (yellow card) 55'; Davies (yellow card) 45'; Warrington (yellow card) 69'	Stadium: Breyer Group Stadium; Attendance: 6,623; Referee: Seb Stockbridge

=== FA Cup ===
Tranmere were drawn away to Crawley Town in the first round and to Leyton Orient in the second round.

6 November 2021 First round	Crawley Town	0–1	Tranmere Rovers	Crawley
15:00 GMT	Davies (yellow card) 25'; Appiah (yellow card) 69'; Francillette (yellow card) 89'	Report	Nevitt (yellow card) 3'; McManaman 38'; Clarke (yellow card) 89'; Dieseruvwe (yellow card) 90+1'	Stadium: People's Pension Stadium; Attendance: 1,765; Referee: Charles Breakspear

4 December 2021 Second round	Leyton Orient	4–0	Tranmere Rovers	Leyton
15:00 GMT	Smith 22', 83'; Beckles 36'; Drinan 60' (pen.)	Report	Spearing (yellow card) 43'; Dacres-Cogley (yellow card) 45+3'; Knight-Percival (yellow card) 59'	Stadium: Breyer Group Stadium; Attendance: 3,248; Referee: James Oldham

=== EFL Cup ===
Rovers were drawn away to Oldham Athletic in the first round.

10 August 2021 First round	Oldham Athletic	2–2 (4–3 p)	Tranmere Rovers	Oldham
19:45 BST	Keillor-Dunn (yellow card) 55'; Bahamboula 59'; Davies 68' (o.g.)	Report	Foley 40', (yellow card) 62'; Nevitt 51'	Stadium: Boundary Park; Attendance: 2,684; Referee: Scott Oldham
	Penalties
	Hart (penalty scored); Keillor-Dunn (penalty scored); Jameson (penalty missed); Stobbs (penalty scored); Adams (penalty scored)		Spearing (penalty scored); Glatzel (penalty missed); Morris (penalty scored); Clarke (penalty missed); Dieseruvwe (penalty scored)

=== EFL Trophy ===
Pos	Div	Team	Pld	W	PW	PL	L	GF	GA	GD	Pts	Qualification
1	L2	Tranmere Rovers	3	3	0	0	0	9	3	+6	9	Advance to Round 2
2	L2	Oldham Athletic	3	1	0	0	2	5	6	−1	3	Advance to Round 2
3	L2	Salford City	3	1	0	0	2	5	6	−1	3	
4	ACA	Leeds United U21	3	1	0	0	2	7	11	−4	3	

Source: EFL.com

14 September 2021 Group game 1	Tranmere Rovers	4–1	Leeds United U21	Birkenhead
19:00 BST	Maynard 7', 41'; Foley 34', (yellow card) 53', (goal) 87'; Merrie (yellow card) 64'	Report	Snowdon (yellow card) 58'; Miller 63'; Dean (yellow card) 81'	Stadium: Prenton Park; Referee: Simon Mather

5 October 2021 Group game 2	Salford City	0–2	Tranmere Rovers	Salford
19:00 BST	Love (yellow card) 56'	Report	Watson 16'; Dieseruvwe (yellow card) 68'; Macdonald (yellow card) 70'; Knight-Percival (yellow card) 76'; Merrie (yellow card) 82'; Walker 86'	Stadium: Peninsula Stadium; Attendance: 720; Referee: Ollie Yates

9 November 2021 Group game 3	Tranmere Rovers	3–2	Oldham Athletic	Birkenhead
19:00 GMT	Glatzel 45+2', 75'; Maynard 55'	Report	Dearnley 15', 43'; Clarke (yellow card) 41'	Stadium: Prenton Park; Referee: Marc Edwards

21 December 2021 Second round	Tranmere Rovers	1–2	Harrogate Town	Birkenhead
19:00 GMT	Maynard 11'	Report	Muldoon 53'; Diamond (yellow card) 64'; Pattison 71'; Thomson (yellow card) 77'	Stadium: Prenton Park; Referee: Sam Barrott

== Transfers ==
=== Transfers in ===
Date	Position	Nationality	Name	From	Fee	Ref.
10 June 2021	CM	(England)	Chris Merrie	(England) Wigan Athletic	Undisclosed	
1 July 2021	RB	(England)	Josh Dacres-Cogley	(England) Birmingham City	Free transfer	
1 July 2021	CB	(England)	Tom Davies	(England) Bristol Rovers	Free transfer	
1 July 2021	RW	(England)	Liam Feeney	(England) Blackpool	Free transfer	
1 July 2021	CB	(England)	Nathaniel Knight-Percival	(England) Morecambe	Free transfer	
1 July 2021	DM	(England)	Ryan Watson	(England) Northampton Town	Free transfer	
1 July 2021	FW	(England)	Emmanuel Dieseruvwe	(England) Salford City	Free transfer	
6 July 2021	LB	(England)	Joe Maguire	(England) Accrington Stanley	Free transfer	
9 July 2021	RW	(England)	Callum McManaman	(Australia) Melbourne Victory	Free transfer	
9 July 2021	CF	(England)	Elliott Nevitt	(England) Warrington Rylands	Free transfer	
22 July 2021	CM	(Republic of Ireland)	Sam Foley	(Scotland) Motherwell	Free transfer	
31 August 2021	RM	(England)	Mark Duffy	(England) Fleetwood Town	Free transfer	
31 August 2021	CF	(England)	Nicky Maynard	(England) Mansfield Town	Free transfer	
13 January 2022	CF	(England)	Kane Hemmings	(England) Burton Albion	Undisclosed	
25 January 2022	LM	(England)	Josh Hawkes	(England) Sunderland	Undisclosed	
25 January 2022	CB	(Republic of Ireland)	Lee O'Connor	(Scotland) Celtic	Undisclosed	
28 January 2022	GK	(Poland)	Mateusz Hewelt	(England) Bamber Bridge	Undisclosed	

=== Loans in ===
Date from	Position	Nationality	Name	From	Date until	Ref.
2 July 2021	CF	(Germany)	Paul Glatzel	(England) Liverpool	End of season	
4 August 2021	GK	(Scotland)	Ross Doohan	(Scotland) Celtic	End of season	
31 August 2021	CB	(Republic of Ireland)	Lee O'Connor	(Scotland) Celtic	25 January 2022 (Note: On 25 January, O'Connor signed permanently.)	
31 August 2021	SS	(England)	Stephen Walker	(England) Middlesbrough	End of season	
2 September 2021	LM	(England)	Josh Hawkes	(England) Sunderland	25 January 2022 (Note: On 25 January, Hawkes signed permanently.)	
5 January 2022	RW	(Scotland)	Josh McPake	(Scotland) Rangers	End of season	
31 January 2022	CM	(England)	Lewis Warrington	(England) Everton	End of season	

=== Loans out ===
Date from	Position	Nationality	Name	To	Date until	Ref.
26 September 2021	CF	(England)	Jake Burton	(England) Stalybridge Celtic	24 October 2021	
29 October 2021	CF	(England)	Charlie Jolley	(England) Chester	6 December 2021	(Note: On 1 December, Jolley's loan at Chester was extended before being terminated on 6 December.)
20 November 2021	MF	(England)	Ryan Stratulis	(England) Marine	December 2021	
28 January 2022	GK	(Poland)	Mateusz Hewelt	(England) Bamber Bridge	End of season	
18 February 2022	CF	(England)	Emmanuel Dieseruvwe	(England) Grimsby Town	End of season	

=== Transfers out ===
Date	Position	Nationality	Name	To	Fee	Ref.
27 May 2021	CF	(England)	James Vaughan	Retired		
30 June 2021	CB	(England)	Mark Ellis	(England) Barrow	Free transfer	
30 June 2021	CF	(England)	Cameron Ferguson	(England) Newcastle United	Undisclosed	
30 June 2021	CM	(England)	Paul Lewis	(England) Northampton Town	Free transfer	
30 June 2021	CB	(Cameroon)	Manny Monthé	(England) Walsall	Free transfer	
30 June 2021	CB	(Wales)	George Ray	(England) Exeter City	Free transfer	
30 June 2021	LB	(England)	Liam Ridehalgh	(England) Bradford City	Free transfer	
30 June 2021	RW	(England)	Danny Walker-Rice	(Wales) Bala Town	Free transfer	
30 June 2021	LW	(England)	Kaiyne Woolery	(Scotland) Motherwell	Free transfer	
6 July 2021	LW	(England)	Danny Lloyd	(England) Gillingham	Free transfer	
9 July 2021	CB	(England)	Sid Nelson	(England) Northampton Town	Free transfer	
30 July 2021	CM	(England)	George Nugent	(England) Witton Albion	Free transfer	
14 August 2021	CM	(England)	Ethan Gouldbourne	(England) Marine	Free transfer	
20 August 2021	LW	(England)	Corey Blackett-Taylor	(England) Charlton Athletic	Free transfer	
18 October 2021	LW	(England)	Otis Khan	(England) Walsall	Free transfer	
5 January 2022	GK	(England)	Scott Davies	Retired		
14 January 2022	DM	(England)	Ryan Watson	(England) Salford City	Undisclosed	
26 January 2022	RW	(England)	Liam Feeney	(England) Scunthorpe United	Mutual consent	
