= Ashley Nathaniel-George =

Footballer (born 1995)

Personal information
- Full name: Ashley Nathaniel-George
- Date of birth: 14 June 1995 (age 31)
- Place of birth: Brent, England
- Height: 1.75 m (5 ft 9 in)
- Position: Winger

Team information
- Current team: Worthing
- Number: 11

Youth career
- Arsenal
- Watford
- Wycombe Wanderers
- Wealdstone

Senior career*
Years	Team	Apps	(Gls)
2015–2017	Potters Bar Town	49	(15)
2017–2018	Hendon	40	(11)
2018–2020	Crawley Town	46	(9)
2020–2022	Southend United	29	(2)
2022	→ Ebbsfleet United (loan)	3	(0)
2022	Torquay United	1	(0)
2022–2024	Maidenhead United	68	(9)
2024–2026	York City	46	(6)
2025–2026	→ Hartlepool United (loan)	2	(0)
2026	→ Wealdstone (loan)	5	(1)
2026–	Worthing	0	(0)

International career^{‡}
2022–	Antigua and Barbuda	11	(1)
- * Club domestic league appearances and goals as of 00:43, 7 June 2026 (UTC) ‡ National team caps and goals as of 19:32, 22 November 2023 (UTC)

Ashley Nathaniel-George (born 14 June 1995) is a professional footballer who plays as a winger for Worthing.

Born in England, he represents Antigua and Barbuda at international level.

== Club career ==
=== Early career ===
Born in Brent, Nathaniel-George began his career with Arsenal but was released when he was 14 and went onto feature for Watford and Wycombe Wanderers before joining non-league side Wealdstone via a scholarship programme. He then played for Potters Bar Town in late 2015 and went on to feature fifteen times in his first campaign. During his second season with the Hertfordshire-based side he scored seventeen times in all competitions. Nathaniel-George made the move to Isthmian League Premier Division side Hendon in July 2017 and scored thirteen times, including twice in their play-off campaign.

=== Crawley Town ===
On 11 June 2018, Nathaniel-George agreed to join League Two side Crawley Town. He made his professional debut on 14 August, coming on as an 81st-minute substitute for Panutche Camará in a 2–1 defeat at Bristol Rovers in the first round of the EFL Cup. Nathaniel-George signed a new two-year contract with the club in June 2020.

=== Southend United ===
On 5 October 2020, Nathaniel-George joined Southend United for an undisclosed fee. Blues boss Mark Molesley was thrilled to get the signing over the line, saying: "Ash is another exciting player. He's got really good attributes, he's skillful, very quick and exciting so I think he's one that will have people on the edge of their seat. He signed an extended contract with the club in December 2020. In April 2021, Nathaniel-George suffered a knee injury which required surgery. He returned to training in January 2022. On 11 February 2022, Nathaniel-George joined National League South side Ebbsfleet United on a one-month loan deal. He was released at the end of the season.

=== Torquay United ===
In August 2022 he was registered with Torquay United after trialing with the club. He made one appearance for the Gulls on the opening day of the season.

=== Maidenhead United ===
Nathaniel-George joined Maidenhead United on a permanent contract on 2 September 2022. He won the supporters' player of the year award for the 2022–23 season.

=== York City ===
Nathaniel-George joined York City for the 2024–25 season.

On 16 December 2025, Nathaniel-George joined fellow National League club Hartlepool United on an initial short-term loan deal. On 21 December, he made his Hartlepool debut in a 0–0 draw away at Braintree Town. He returned to York in late January following a "decidely underwhelming loan", but after two further appearances for York, he left on loan again, joining Wealdstone on loan until the end of the season on 28 March 2026.

=== Worthing ===
In June 2026 he signed for Worthing.

== International career ==
He made his international debut for Antigua and Barbuda on 3 June 2022.

== Style of play ==
Nathaniel-George plays as a winger and is known for his pace.

== Career statistics ==
=== Club ===
As of 25 April 2026

Appearances and goals by club, season and competition
Club	Season	League			FA Cup		League Cup		Other		Total	
Club	Season	Division	Apps	Goals	Apps	Goals	Apps	Goals	Apps	Goals	Apps	Goals
Potters Bar Town	2015–16	SFL Division One Central	14	0	0	0	—		1 (Note: Appearance(s) in Southern League Cup)	0	15	0
Potters Bar Town	2016–17	SFL Division One Central	35	15	6	2	—		1 (Note: Appearance(s) in FA Trophy)	0	42	17
Potters Bar Town	Total		49	15	6	2	—		2	0	57	17
Hendon	2017–18	Isthmian League Premier Division	40	11	2	0	—		10 (Note: Six appearances in FA Trophy, two appearances in Alan Turvey Trophy, two appearances and two goals in Isthmian League Premier Division play-offs)	2	52	13
Crawley Town	2018–19	League Two	30	6	2	0	1	0	2 (Note: Appearance(s) in Football League Trophy)	0	35	6
Crawley Town	2019–20	League Two	16	3	1	1	2	0	3	1	22	5
Crawley Town	Total		46	9	3	1	3	0	5	1	57	11
Southend United	2020–21	League Two	29	2	1	0	0	0	2	0	32	2
Southend United	2021–22	National League	0	0	0	0	0	0	0	0	0	0
Southend United	Total		29	2	1	0	0	0	2	0	32	2
Ebbsfleet United (loan)	2021–22	National League South	3	0	0	0	0	0	0	0	3	0
Torquay United	2022–23	National League	1	0	0	0	0	0	0	0	1	0
Maidenhead United	2022–23	National League	34	4	2	0	0	0	2	1	38	5
Maidenhead United	2023–24	National League	34	5	1	0	–		0	0	35	5
Maidenhead United	Total		68	9	3	0	0	0	2	1	73	10
York City	2024–25	National League	36	6	1	0	—		3 (Note: Two appearances in FA Trophy, one appearance for National League play-offs)	0	40	6
York City	2025–26	National League	10	0	0	0	—		0	0	10	0
York City	Total		46	6	1	0	0	0	3	0	50	6
Hartlepool United (loan)	2025–26	National League	2	0	0	0	0	0	0	0	2	0
Wealdstone (loan)	2025–26	National League	5	1	0	0	0	0	1	0	6	1
Career total			289	53	16	3	3	0	25	4	333	60

=== International ===
As of match played 21 November 2023

Appearances and goals by national team and year
National team	Year	Apps	Goals
Antigua and Barbuda	2022	4	0
Antigua and Barbuda	2023	7	1
Total		11	1

Scores and results list Antigua and Barbuda's goal tally first

No.	Date	Venue	Opponent	Score	Result	Competition
1.	23 March 2023	Stade René Serge Nabajoth, Les Abymes, Guadeloupe	Guadeloupe	1–0	1–0	2022–23 CONCACAF Nations League B

== Honours ==
York City

- National League: 2025–26

Wealdstone

- FA Trophy runner-up: 2025–26
