= Paul Glatzel =

English-German footballer (born 2001)

Personal information
- Full name: Paul Milton Glatzel
- Date of birth: 20 February 2001 (age 25)
- Place of birth: Liverpool, England
- Height: 1.74 m (5 ft 9 in)
- Position: Striker

Team information
- Current team: Swindon Town
- Number: 9

Youth career
- 2009–2021: Liverpool

Senior career*
Years	Team	Apps	(Gls)
2021–2024	Liverpool	0	(0)
2021–2022	→ Tranmere Rovers (loan)	16	(4)
2022–2023	→ Tranmere Rovers (loan)	1	(0)
2024–	Swindon Town	83	(12)

International career
2015–2016	England U15	2	(0)
2016–2017	England U16	2	(0)
2018–2019	Germany U18	2	(1)
- * Club domestic league appearances and goals as of 12:39, 27 September 2026 (UTC)

Paul Milton Glatzel (born 20 February 2001) is a professional footballer who plays as a striker for EFL League Two club Swindon Town. Born in England, he has represented both England and Germany at youth level.

== Early and personal life ==
Glatzel was born in Liverpool, England to German parents.

== Club career ==
Glatzel began his career with Liverpool at under-9 level. He captained the under-18 youth team. He signed a new long-term contract with the club in September 2019. He missed the 2019–20 season due to injury, and suffered further injuries in September 2020, and November 2020.

He moved on loan to Tranmere Rovers in July 2021. Glatzel made his professional debut on 7 August 2021, starting in a 1–0 win over Walsall.

He returned to Tranmere on loan on 1 September 2022.

He signed for Swindon Town on 12 January 2024. He made his debut the next day, starting in a 2–1 defeat at Crewe Alexandra. He was offered a new contract by Swindon at the end of the 2024–25 season.

On 31 May 2025 the club announced he had signed a new two-year contract.

== International career ==
Glatzel played for England at under-15 and under-16 youth levels, but switched to Germany at under-18 level. He made his Germany under-18 debut in a 1–0 win over Cyprus in November 2018, and scored his first youth international goal in the 3–0 win over Belgium in a friendly in May 2019.

== Career statistics ==
As of match played 26 September 2026

Appearances and goals by club, season and competition
Club	Season	League			FA Cup		League Cup		Other		Total	
Club	Season	Division	Apps	Goals	Apps	Goals	Apps	Goals	Apps	Goals	Apps	Goals
Liverpool	2020–21	Premier League	0	0	0	0	0	0	1 (Note: Appearance(s) in the EFL Trophy.)	0	1	0
Liverpool	2021–22	Premier League	0	0	0	0	0	0	0	0	0	0
Liverpool	2022–23	Premier League	0	0	0	0	0	0	0	0	0	0
Liverpool	2023–24	Premier League	0	0	0	0	0	0	1	1	1	1
Liverpool	Total		0	0	0	0	0	0	2	1	2	1
Tranmere Rovers (loan)	2021–22	League Two	16	4	1	0	1	0	3 (Note: Appearance(s) in the EFL Trophy.)	2	21	6
Tranmere Rovers (loan)	2022–23	League Two	1	0	0	0	0	0	0	0	1	0
Swindon Town	2023–24	League Two	19	7	0	0	0	0	0	0	19	7
Swindon Town	2024–25	League Two	39	3	0	0	1	0	5	2	45	5
Swindon Town	2025–26	League Two	21	2	1	0	1	0	3	2	26	4
Swindon Town	2026–27	League Two	4	0	0	0	1	1	1	0	6	1
Swindon Town	Total		83	12	1	0	3	1	9	4	96	17
Career total			100	16	2	0	4	1	14	6	120	24
