= Lamine Kaba Sherif =

Guinean footballer (born 1999)

Personal information
- Full name: Lamine Kaba Sherif
- Date of birth: 27 January 1999 (age 27)
- Place of birth: Conakry, Guinea
- Height: 1.77 m (5 ft 10 in)
- Position: Midfielder

Team information
- Current team: Stratford Town

Youth career
- 2009–2019: Leicester City

Senior career*
Years	Team	Apps	(Gls)
2019–2021	Accrington Stanley	8	(0)
2021–2022	Kettering Town	9	(0)
2022	AFC Telford United	1	(0)
2022–2023	Peterborough Sports	20	(2)
2022	→ Ilkeston Town (loan)	4	(0)
2023–2024	Spalding United		
2024	Barwell	4	(0)
2024–2025	Spalding United	32	(1)
2025–	Stratford Town	2	(0)
- * Club domestic league appearances and goals as of 19:57, 29 November 2025 (UTC)

Lamine Kaba Sherif (born 27 January 1999) is a Guinean professional footballer who plays as a midfielder for Southern League Premier Division Central club Stratford Town.

== Club career ==
Kaba Sherif joined the Leicester City academy at under-10 level, and turned professional in 2017. He was released from Leicester in June 2019.

Kaba Sherif joined Accrington Stanley on a two-year contract in July 2019. On 3 August 2019, he made his league debut for Accrington as a 79th-minute substitute during a 2–0 defeat to Lincoln City.

On 14 May 2021, it was announced that he would leave Accrington at the end of the season, following the expiry of his contract.

In August 2021, he signed for Kettering Town. On 2 January 2022, it was announced that Sherif had left the club.

On 11 February 2022, Sherif joined National League North side AFC Telford United on a non-contract basis.

In March 2022, Sherif signed for Southern League Premier Division Central side Peterborough Sports.

In November 2022, Sherif joined Southern League Premier Division Central side Ilkeston Town on loan. He later played for Spalding United and Barwell. In November 2025, he joined Stratford Town.

== International career ==
In March 2019, Kaba Sherif received a callup from the Guinea under-23 team.
