= Andrew Scott (Northern Irish footballer) =

Northern Irish footballer

Personal information
- Full name: Andrew Darren Scott
- Date of birth: 19 June 2000 (age 26)
- Place of birth: Castlederg, Northern Ireland
- Position: Winger

Team information
- Current team: Ballymena United

Youth career
- Maiden City Soccer Academy

Senior career*
Years	Team	Apps	(Gls)
2018–2020	Accrington Stanley	0	(0)
2018–2019	→ Stalybridge Celtic (loan)	18	(5)
2019–2020	→ Curzon Ashton (loan)	7	(1)
2020	→ Radcliffe (loan)		
2020–2023	Larne	44	(1)
2023–2024	Coleraine	52	(2)
2024–	Ballymena United	27	(4)

International career
- Northern Ireland U17
- * Club domestic league appearances and goals as of 09:00, 21 February 2026 (UTC)

Andrew Darren Scott (born 19 June 2000) is a Northern Irish professional footballer who plays as a winger for NIFL Premiership side Ballymena United.

== Early and personal life ==
Scott is from Castlederg, and was born in the town.

== Club career ==
After playing for the Maiden City Soccer Academy in Derry, he signed a three-year contract with English club Accrington Stanley in August 2018 following a trial.

In December 2018 he joined Stalybridge Celtic on loan for a month. He scored on his debut for the club on 8 December 2018. On 19 January 2019, he was loaned out to the club again.

In December 2019 he joined Curzon Ashton on loan for a month.

In February 2020 he joined Radcliffe on loan.

In June 2020 it was announced he would leave Accrington on 30 June when his contract expired.

In August 2020 he signed for Larne. In January 2023 he moved to Coleraine.

In August 2024 he signed for Ballymena United.

== International career ==
Scott has been capped for Northern Ireland at under-17 youth level.

== Honours ==
Larne

- County Antrim Shield: (2) 2020–21, 2021-22
