= 2021 EFL Trophy final =

2021 EFL Trophy Final
- Event: 2020–21 EFL Trophy
Sunderland	Tranmere Rovers
1	0
- Date: 14 March 2021
- Venue: Wembley Stadium, London
- Referee: Charles Breakspear
- Attendance: 0

The 2021 EFL Trophy Final (known for sponsorship reasons as the 2021 Papa John's Trophy Final) was a football match that was played at Wembley Stadium. It decided the winners of the 2020–21 EFL Trophy, the 37th edition of the competition, a knock-out tournament for the 48 teams in League One and League Two and 16 category one academy sides. The match was played on 14 March 2021, one day after the final for the previous tournament, which was postponed due to the COVID-19 pandemic. Although no fans were present, supporters raised money for local initiatives through virtual ticket sales.

Sunderland won 1–0 for their first win at Wembley in 48 years.

== Route to the final ==
=== Sunderland ===
Pos	Div	Team	Pld	W	PW	PL	L	GF	GA	GD	Pts	Qualification
1	L1	Fleetwood Town	3	3	0	0	0	8	2	+6	9	Advance to Round 2
2	L1	Sunderland	3	2	0	0	1	14	6	+8	6	Advance to Round 2
3	L2	Carlisle United	3	1	0	0	2	7	9	−2	3	
4	ACA	Aston Villa U21	3	0	0	0	3	2	14	−12	0	

Source: EFL.com

8 September 2020 Group Stage	Sunderland	8–1	Aston Villa U21	Stadium of Light
19:00 BST	Wyke 15', 50'; Feeney 21'; Scowen 75'; Power 77'; Graham 82'; Dobson 84'; O'Brien 90'	Report	Vassilev 47' (pen.)	Attendance: 0 Referee: Carl Boyeson

6 October 2020 Group Stage	Sunderland	5–3	Carlisle United	Stadium of Light
19:45 BST	Maguire 26', 54'; Hume 37'; Wyke 69'; Diamond 90+1'		Alessandra 6' (pen.); Mellish 72', 82'	Attendance: 0

10 November 2020 Group Stage	Fleetwood Town	2–1	Sunderland	Highbury Stadium
19:45 GMT	McKay 51'; Duffy 59'		McFadzean 15'	Attendance: 0

8 December 2020 Round 2	Oldham Athletic	1–2	Sunderland	Oldham
19:00 GMT	Grant 13'	Report	Maguire 30'; Scowen 64'	Stadium: Boundary Park; Attendance: 0

12 January 2021 Round 3	Sunderland	2–0	Port Vale	Sunderland
18:00 GMT	O'Brien 21'; McGeady 90+7' (pen.)			Stadium: Stadium of Light; Referee: Declan Bourne

2 February 2021 Quarter-Final	Milton Keynes Dons	0–3	Sunderland	Milton Keynes
18:30 GMT	Harvie (yellow card) 56'; Gladwin (yellow card) 69'	Report	Lewington 12' (o.g.); McGeady 76'; Wyke 82'	Stadium: Stadium MK; Attendance: 0 Referee: Thomas Bramall

17 February 2021 Semi-Final	Sunderland	1–1 (5–3 p)	Lincoln City	Sunderland
18:00 GMT	Wyke 75'	Report	Scully 64'	Stadium: Stadium of Light; Attendance: 0 Referee: Ben Toner
	Penalties
	Power (penalty scored); O'Nien (penalty scored); Maguire (penalty scored); McGeady (penalty scored); Leadbitter (penalty scored)		Scully (penalty scored); McGrandles (penalty scored); Howarth (penalty missed); Johnson (penalty scored)

=== Tranmere Rovers ===
Pos	Div	Team	Pld	W	PW	PL	L	GF	GA	GD	Pts	Qualification
1	L2	Port Vale	3	2	1	0	0	7	3	+4	8	Advance to Round 2
2	L2	Tranmere Rovers	3	1	1	1	0	5	4	+1	6	Advance to Round 2
3	L1	Wigan Athletic	3	1	0	1	1	9	6	+3	4	
4	ACA	Liverpool U21	3	0	0	0	3	5	13	−8	0	

Source: EFL.com

8 September 2020 Group Stage	Port Vale	0–0 (4–3 p)	Tranmere Rovers	Vale Park
19:00 BST		Report		Attendance: 0 Referee: Declan Bourne
	Penalties
	Whitehead (penalty scored); Cullen (penalty scored); Conlon (penalty missed); Trickett-Smith (penalty missed); Rodney (penalty scored); Fitzpatrick (penalty scored)		Banks (penalty scored); Khan (penalty missed); Morris (penalty scored); O'Connor (penalty scored); Payne (penalty missed); Walker-Rice (penalty missed)

29 September 2020 Group Stage	Tranmere Rovers	3–2	Liverpool U21	Prenton Park
19:00 BST	Vaughan 74', 75'; Payne 90'	Report	Cain 50'; Longstaff 83'	Attendance: 0 Referee: Scott Oldham

11 November 2020 Group Stage	Tranmere Rovers	2–2 (3–1 p)	Wigan Athletic	Birkenhead
18:30 GMT	Woolery 45+1'; Morris 72'	Report	Keane 19'; McHugh 45+3'	Stadium: Prenton Park; Attendance: 0 Referee: Ben Speedie
	Penalties
	Ferrier (penalty missed); Lloyd (penalty scored); Smith (penalty missed); Banks (penalty scored); Morris (penalty scored)		James (penalty scored); Joseph (penalty missed); Perry (penalty missed); Crankshaw (penalty missed)

8 December 2020 Round 2	Tranmere Rovers	2–1	Manchester City U21	Birkenhead
19:00 GMT	Lloyd 27'; Banks 88' (pen.)	Report	Delap 17'	Stadium: Prenton Park

13 January 2021 Round 3	Tranmere Rovers	4–2	Leicester City U21	Birkenhead
19:30 GMT	Ferrier 4'; Lloyd 37', 45+1'; Blackett-Taylor 53'		Wakeling 36'; Suengchitthawon 56'	Stadium: Prenton Park; Referee: Marc Edwards

2 February 2021 Quarter-Final	Tranmere Rovers	2–1	Peterborough United	Birkenhead
19:00 GMT	Lloyd 38'; Lewis 82'		Clarke-Harris 90+1' (pen.)	Stadium: Prenton Park

16 February 2021 Semi-Final	Oxford United	0–2	Tranmere Rovers	Oxford
18:00 GMT	Joe Grayson (yellow card) 37'; Matty Taylor (yellow card) 75'	Report	Calum Macdonald (yellow card) 17'; Kaiyne Woolery 35' Kieron Morris 66'; James Vaughan (yellow card) 90+6'	Stadium: Kassam Stadium; Attendance: 0 Referee: Craig Hicks

== Match ==
14 March 2021
15:00 GMT

Sunderland	1–0	Tranmere Rovers
Gooch 57'	Report

Wembley Stadium, London
Attendance: 0
Referee: Charles Breakspear

Sunderland	Tranmere Rovers

GK	1	(England) Lee Burge
RB	6	(England) Max Power (c)	(yellow card) 90+2'
CB	3	(Northern Ireland) Tom Flanagan		(substituted off) 44'
CB	13	(England) Luke O'Nien
LB	25	(Scotland) Callum McFadzean
DM	14	(England) Josh Scowen
DM	23	(England) Grant Leadbitter
AM	7	(Scotland) Chris Maguire		(substituted off) 63'
AM	28	(Republic of Ireland) Aiden McGeady
CF	11	(United States) Lynden Gooch
CF	9	(England) Charlie Wyke
Substitutes:
GK	20	(England) Remi Matthews
DF	2	(Northern Ireland) Conor McLaughlin		(substituted on) 44'
DF	35	(England) Ollie Younger
MF	12	(Sweden) Benjamin Mbunga-Kimpioka
MF	24	(England) Daniel Neil
FW	21	(England) Jack Diamond		(substituted on) 63'
FW	31	(Scotland) Ross Stewart
Manager:
(England) Lee Johnson

GK	1	(England) Scott Davies (c)
RB	17	(England) Otis Khan
CB	26	(England) Peter Clarke
CB	21	(Wales) George Ray
LB	18	(Scotland) Calum Macdonald
DM	19	(England) Liam Feeney
DM	8	(England) Jay Spearing
RM	14	(England) Kaiyne Woolery
AM	7	(England) Kieron Morris	(substituted off) 90+1'
LM	35	(England) Danny Lloyd	(substituted off) 65'
CF	22	(England) Paul Lewis	(substituted off) 65'
Substitutes:
GK	13	(Republic of Ireland) Joe Murphy
DF	3	(England) Liam Ridehalgh
DF	6	(Cameroon) Manny Monthé
MF	11	(England) Corey Blackett-Taylor	(substituted on) 65'
MF	16	(England) Nya Kirby
FW	27	(England) Jake Burton	(substituted on) 90+1'
FW	28	(England) David Nugent	(substituted on) 65'
Manager:
(England) Keith Hill
