= 2015–16 Bolton Wanderers F.C. season =

Bolton Wanderers F.C.
2015–16 season
- Chairman: Phil Gartside (until 10 February 2016)
- Manager: Neil Lennon (until 15 March 2016); Jimmy Phillips (interim from 15 March 2016)
- Stadium: Macron Stadium
- 2015–16 Football League Championship: 24th (relegated)
- FA Cup: Fourth round
- League Cup: First round
- Top goalscorer: League: Zach Clough (7); All: Zach Clough (7)
- Highest home attendance: 18,178 vs Leeds United (24 October 2015)
- Lowest home attendance: 5,842 vs Burton Albion (11 August 2015)
- Average home league attendance: 14,977
Home colours	Away colours	Third colours

The 2015–16 season is Bolton Wanderers's fourth consecutive season in the Football League Championship following their relegation from the Premier League in 2012. Along with the Championship, the club will also compete in the FA Cup and Football League Cup. The season covers the period from 1 July 2015 to 30 June 2016.

== Pre-season ==
On 19 May 2015, Bolton Wanderers announced their pre-season schedule in full for both the entire squad and an XI squad. On 2 June 2015, the club confirmed their home pre-season friendly against ChievoVerona. On 26 June 2015, Bolton Wanderers announced the club will face two friendlies during their Austria tour. Bolton were set to play against Italian team A.C. ChievoVerona, however Chievo cancelled friendlies against both Bolton and Charlton Athletic, who also were set to play against them, which lead to the two teams playing against each other instead.

4 July 2015 Friendly	Atherton Collieries	1–1	Bolton Wanderers XI	Atherton
15:00 BST	Bancroft 90'	Report	Thomas 82' (pen.)	Stadium: Alder House

6 July 2015 Friendly	Guisborough Town	1–3	Bolton Wanderers XI	Guisborough
19:45 BST		Report	Woolery; Palmer; Thomas	Stadium: King George V Ground

8 July 2015 Friendly	Spennymoor Town	2–2	Bolton Wanderers XI	Spennymoor
19:45 BST	51'; 59'	Report	Holding 42'; Woolery 69'	Stadium: The Brewery Field

11 July 2015 Friendly	Sturm Graz	2–1	Bolton Wanderers	Kumberg, Austria
18:00 CEST	Dobras 43'; Kienast 86' (pen.)	Report	Davies 48'	Stadium: Stadion Kumberg

13 July 2015 Friendly	SC Paderborn	4–1	Bolton Wanderers	Kapfenberg, Austria
17:00 BST	Proschwitz 22' (pen.); Sağlık 55'; Ndjeng 63'; Ouali 79'	Report	Madine 25'	Stadium: Franz Fekete Stadium

15 July 2015 Friendly	Chorley	0–1	Bolton Wanderers XI	Chorley
19:45 BST		Report	Woolery 22'	Stadium: Victory Park

17 July 2015 Friendly	Morecambe	2–1	Bolton Wanderers	Morecambe
19:45 BST	Wildig 41'; Mullin 49'	Report	Dobbie 32'	Stadium: Globe Arena

18 July 2015 Friendly	Colwyn Bay	1–2	Bolton Wanderers XI	Old Colwyn, Wales
15:00 BST	Barnes 46'	Report	Newell 40'; Spooner 86'	Stadium: Llanelian Road

21 July 2015 Friendly	Oldham Athletic	0–2	Bolton Wanderers	Oldham
19:45 BST		Report	Feeney (?); Madine 44'	Stadium: Boundary Park

22 July 2015 Friendly	Stockport County	2–2	Bolton Wanderers XI	Stockport
19:45 BST	O'Hanlon 45'; Bell-Baggie 64'	Report	Thomas 48' (pen.); Holding 54'	Stadium: Edgeley Park

25 July 2015 Friendly	Tamworth	3–0	Bolton Wanderers XI	Tamworth
15:00 BST	Green 30'; Durrell 61'; Dyer 88'	Report		Stadium: The Lamb Ground

28 July 2015 Friendly	Port Vale	1–2	Bolton Wanderers	Burslem
19:30 BST	Leitch-Smith	Report	Madine 40'; Danns	Stadium: Vale Park

29 July 2015 Friendly	AFC Fylde	1–1	Bolton Wanderers XI	Warton
19:30 BST	Charles 80' (pen.)	Report	Newell 55' (pen.)	Stadium: Kellamergh Park

31 July 2015 Friendly	Bolton Wanderers	2–2	Charlton Athletic	Bolton
20:00 BST	Pratley 24'; Feeney 46'	Report	Watt 42', 60'	Stadium: Macron Stadium

1 August 2015 Friendly	Southport	0–3	Bolton Wanderers XI	Blowick
15:00 BST		Report	Woolery (?); Thomas (?)	Stadium: Merseyrail Community Stadium

4 August 2015 Friendly	Ramsbottom United	1–2	Bolton Wanderers XI	Ramsbottom
19:45 BST	Spencer (pen.)	Report	Cvetko 6' (pen.); Abbotts	Stadium: The Harry Williams Riverside Stadium

=== Mid-season friendlies ===
5 September 2015 Keith Lasley Testimonial	Motherwell	1–2	Bolton Wanderers	Motherwell
15:00 BST	Alfie Lasley (Keith Lasley's son, goal let in on purpose) 90'	Report	Heskey 51'; Dobbie 90'	Stadium: Fir Park; Attendance: 2352

== Competitions ==
=== Football League Championship ===
==== Matches ====
On 17 June 2015, the fixtures for the forthcoming season were announced.

8 August 2015 1	Bolton Wanderers	0–0	Derby County	Bolton
15:00 BST	Spearing (red card) 86'	Report		Stadium: Macron Stadium; Attendance: 17,162; Referee: Andy Madley

15 August 2015 2	Middlesbrough	3–0	Bolton Wanderers	Middlesbrough
15:00 BST	Diego Fabbrini 7'; Kike 17', 32'	Report		Stadium: Riverside Stadium; Attendance: 23,333; Referee: James Adcock

18 August 2015 3	Milton Keynes Dons	1–0	Bolton Wanderers	Denbigh
19:45 BST	Powell 60'	Report		Stadium: Stadium mk Attendance: 10,765; Referee: Stuart Attwell

22 August 2015 4	Bolton Wanderers	1–1	Nottingham Forest	Bolton
15:00 BST	Dobbie 90+4'	Report	Vaughan 81'	Stadium: Macron Stadium; Attendance: 16,410; Referee: Carl Boyeson

28 August 2015 5	Blackburn Rovers	0–0	Bolton Wanderers	Blackburn
19:45 BST		Report		Stadium: Ewood Park; Attendance: 14,632; Referee: Paul Tierney

12 September 2015 6	Bolton Wanderers	2–1	Wolverhampton Wanderers	Bolton
15:00 BST	Feeney 17'; Clough 45' (pen.)	Report	Afobe 68' (pen.)	Stadium: Macron Stadium; Attendance: 14,698; Referee: Scott Duncan

15 September 2015 7	Bolton Wanderers	0–0	Sheffield Wednesday	Bolton
20:00 BST		Report		Stadium: Macron Stadium; Attendance: 14,438; Referee: Peter Bankes

19 September 2015 8	Huddersfield Town	4–1	Bolton Wanderers	Huddersfield
15:00 BST	Huws 45', 74'; Carayol 51'; Lynch 83'	Report	Feeney 3'	Stadium: John Smith's Stadium; Attendance: 11,762; Referee: Trevor Kettle

26 September 2015 9	Bolton Wanderers	2–2	Brighton & Hove Albion	Bolton
15:00 BST	Danns 41'; Madine 90+4'	Report	Stephens 31'; Murphy 35'	Stadium: Macron Stadium; Attendance: 13,405; Referee: Mark Haywood

3 October 2015 10	Queens Park Rangers	4–3	Bolton Wanderers	London
15:00 BST	Emmanuel-Thomas 13', 90+4'; Fer 44'; Chery 62'	Report	Madine 8'; Feeney 11'; Silva 85'	Stadium: Loftus Road; Attendance: 16,026; Referee: Darren Drysdale

17 October 2015 11	Burnley	2–0	Bolton Wanderers	Burnley
15:00 BST	Gray 56', 68'	Report		Stadium: Turf Moor; Attendance: 17,632; Referee: Graham Scott

20 October 2015 12	Bolton Wanderers	0–1	Birmingham City	Bolton
20:00 BST		Report	Robinson 20'	Stadium: Macron Stadium; Attendance: 13,703; Referee: Geoff Eltringham

24 October 2015 13	Bolton Wanderers	1–1	Leeds United	Bolton
15:00 BST	Ameobi 32'; Prince-Désir Gouano (red card) 71'	Report	Antenucci 71' (pen.)	Stadium: Macron Stadium; Attendance: 18,178; Referee: Simon Hooper

31 October 2015 14	Preston North End	0–0	Bolton Wanderers	Preston
18:00 GMT		Report		Stadium: Deepdale; Attendance: 14,494; Referee: Dean Whitestone

31 October 2015 15	Ipswich Town	2–0	Bolton Wanderers	Ipswich
18:00 GMT	Maitland-Niles 13'; Pitman 70'	Report		Stadium: Portman Road; Attendance: 17,071; Referee: Darren Deadman

7 November 2015 16	Bolton Wanderers	0–0	Bristol City	Bolton
15:00 GMT		Report		Stadium: Macron Stadium; Attendance: 14,239; Referee: Stuart Atwell

21 November 2015 17	Reading	2–1	Bolton Wanderers	Reading
15:00 GMT (UTC)	Piazon 28'; Williams 34'	BBC Report	Feeney 80' (pen.)	Stadium: Madejski Stadium; Attendance: 16,420; Referee: James Linington

30 November 2015 18	Bolton Wanderers	1–1	Brentford	Bolton
19:45 GMT	Danns 65'	Report	Swift 10'	Stadium: Macron Stadium; Attendance: 12,731; Referee: Carl Boyeson

5 December 2015 19	Bolton Wanderers	2–3	Cardiff City	Bolton
15:00 GMT	Madine 17'; Dervite 71'	BBC Report	Watt 13'; Malone 53'; Pilkington 80'	Stadium: Macron Stadium; Attendance: 13,241; Referee: Tony Harrington

12 December 2015 20	Hull City	1–0	Bolton Wanderers	Kingston upon Hull
15:00 GMT	Akpom 19'	Report		Stadium: KC Stadium; Attendance: 15,739; Referee: Michael Bull

15 December 2015 21	Charlton Athletic	2–2	Bolton Wanderers	Charlton
19:45 GMT	Lookman 1', 26'	Report	Heskey 32'; Vela 42'	Stadium: The Valley; Attendance: 12,294; Referee: Graham Horwood

19 December 2015 22	Bolton Wanderers	2–2	Fulham	Bolton
15:00 GMT	Clough 61', 74'	Report	Garbutt 28'; McCormack 85'	Stadium: Macron Stadium; Attendance: 14,543; Referee: Nigel Miller

26 December 2015 23	Rotherham United	4–0	Bolton Wanderers	Rotherham
15:00 GMT	G Ward 56'; D Ward 74'; Newell 80'; Clarke-Harris 86'	Report		Stadium: New York Stadium; Attendance: 11,315; Referee: Geoff Eltringham

28 December 2015 24	Bolton Wanderers	1–0	Blackburn Rovers	Bolton
15:00 GMT	Madine 77'	Report		Stadium: Macron Stadium; Attendance: 18,048; Referee: Jonathan Moss

2 January 2016 25	Bolton Wanderers	0–2	Huddersfield Town	Bolton
15:00 GMT		Report	Lolley 61'; Carayol 87'	Stadium: Macron Stadium; Attendance: 15,969; Referee: Andy Haines

2 January 2016 26	Sheffield Wednesday	3–2	Bolton Wanderers	Sheffield
19:45 GMT	Forestieri 14'; Hooper 52', 77'	Report	Madine 19'; Wheater 62'	Stadium: Hillsborough Stadium; Attendance: 20,757; Referee: Simon Hooper

16 January 2016 27	Nottingham Forest	3–0	Bolton Wanderers	Nottingham
15:00 GMT	Oliveira 12' (pen.); O. Burke 16'; Ward 83'	Report		Stadium: City Ground; Attendance: 18,465; Referee: Eddie Ilderton

23 January 2016 28	Bolton Wanderers	3–1	Milton Keynes Dons	Bolton
15:00 GMT	Holding 7'; Pratley 41'; Ameobi 90'	Report	Murphy 89'	Stadium: Macron Stadium; Attendance: 13,932; Referee: Kevin Wright

2 February 2016 29	Wolverhampton Wanderers	2–2	Bolton Wanderers	Wolverhampton
19:45 GMT	Mason 3'; Henry 77'	Report	Wellington 81'; Dobbie 88'	Stadium: Molineux; Attendance: 17,825; Referee: Fred Graham

6 February 2016 30	Bolton Wanderers	2–1	Rotherham United	Bolton
15:00 GMT	Spearing 2'; Woolery 90+2'	Report	Burke 43'	Stadium: Macron Stadium; Attendance: 14641; Referee: Stuart Attwell

13 February 2016 31	Brighton & Hove Albion	3–2	Bolton Wanderers	Brighton
15:00 GMT	Murphy 11'; Hemed 43'; Kayal 58'	Report	Heskey 22'; Spearing 52'	Stadium: Falmer Stadium; Attendance: 26,717; Referee: Robert Lewis

20 February 2016 32	Bolton Wanderers	1–1	Queens Park Rangers	London
15:00 GMT	Clough 68'	Report	Phillips 90+3'	Stadium: Loftus Road; Attendance: 14,085; Referee: Jeremy Simpson

23 February 2016 33	Birmingham City	1–0	Bolton Wanderers	Birmingham
19:45 GMT	Donaldson 29'	Report		Stadium: St Andrew's; Attendance: 15,992; Referee: Scott Duncan

27 February 2016 34	Bolton Wanderers	1–2	Burnley	Bolton
15:00 GMT	Feeney 69'	Report	Gray 74', 85'	Stadium: Macron Stadium; Attendance: 17,484; Referee: Steve Martin

5 March 2016 35	Leeds United	2–1	Bolton Wanderers	Leeds
15:00 GMT	Antenucci 39', 62'	Report	Woolery 74'	Stadium: Elland Road; Attendance: 21,070; Referee: Tony Harrington

8 March 2016 36	Bolton Wanderers	2–2	Ipswich Town	Bolton
19:45 GMT	Wilson 73'; Dobbie 90+7' (pen.)	Report	Bru 24'; Berra 72'	Stadium: Macron Stadium; Attendance: 12,681; Referee: Mark Haywood

12 March 2016 37	Bolton Wanderers	1–2	Preston North End	Bolton
15:00 GMT	Trotter 22'	Report	Hugill 57'; Vermijl 86'	Stadium: Macron Stadium; Attendance: 18,423; Referee: Paul Tierney

12 March 2016 38	Bristol City	6–0	Bolton Wanderers	Bristol
15:00 GMT	Wilbraham 3'; Tomlin 40'; Odemwingie 53'; Wagstaff 79'; Kodjia 86', 87'	Report		Stadium: Ashton Gate Stadium; Attendance: 15,608; Referee: James Adcock

2 April 2016 39	Bolton Wanderers	0–1	Reading	Bolton
15:00 BST	Holding (red card) 22'	Report	John 90'	Stadium: Macron Stadium; Attendance: 13,469; Referee: Geoff Eltringham

5 April 2016 40	Brentford	3–1	Bolton Wanderers	Brentford
15:00 BST	Yennaris 17'; Vibe 26', 36'	Report	Clough 70' (pen.)	Stadium: Griffin Park; Attendance: 9,062; Referee: Andy Davies

9 April 2016 41	Derby County	4–1	Bolton Wanderers	Derby
19:45 BST	Russell 13', 77'; Ince 38'; Butterfield 69'	Report	Clough 73' (pen.)	Stadium: Pride Park Stadium; Attendance: 29,674; Referee: Andy Woolmer

16 April 2016 42	Bolton Wanderers	1–2	Middlesbrough	Bolton
12:30 BST	Vela 61'	Report	Rhodes 73', 90+1'	Stadium: Macron Stadium; Attendance: 18,196; Referee: Keith Stroud

19 April 2016 43	Bolton Wanderers	0–0	Charlton Athletic	Bolton
20:00 BST		Report		Stadium: Macron Stadium; Attendance: 12,257; Referee: Eddie Ilderton

23 April 2016 44	Cardiff City	2–1	Bolton Wanderers	Cardiff
	Zohore 55'; Whittingham	Report	Clough 7'	Stadium: Cardiff City Stadium; Attendance: 24,189

30 April 2016 45	Bolton Wanderers	1–0	Hull City	Bolton
	Dobbie 65'	Report		Stadium: Macron Stadium; Attendance: 14,366

7 May 2016 46	Fulham	1–0	Bolton Wanderers	Fulham
	Cairney 77'	Report		Stadium: Craven Cottage; Attendance: 17,207

==== League table ====
Pos	Team	Pld	W	D	L	GF	GA	GD	Pts	Promotion, qualification or relegation
20	Fulham	46	12	15	19	66	79	−13	51	
21	Rotherham United	46	13	10	23	53	71	−18	49	
22	Charlton Athletic (R)	46	9	13	24	40	80	−40	40	Relegation to EFL League One
23	Milton Keynes Dons (R)	46	9	12	25	39	69	−30	39	Relegation to EFL League One
24	Bolton Wanderers (R)	46	5	15	26	41	81	−40	30	Relegation to EFL League One

Source: BBC Sport
Rules for classification: 1) Points; 2) Goal difference; 3) Number of goals scored
(R) Relegated

=== FA Cup ===
9 January 2016 Third round	Eastleigh	1–1	Bolton Wanderers	Eastleigh
15:00 GMT	Dervite 51' (o.g.)	Report	Pratley 87'	Stadium: Silverlake Stadium; Attendance: 5,250; Referee: Iain Williamson

19 January 2016 Third round replay	Bolton Wanderers	3–2	Eastleigh	Bolton
20:00 Greenwich Mean Time	Madine 39'; Moxey 43'; Pratley 58'	Report	Partington 11'; Mohamed 45'	Stadium: Macron Stadium; Attendance: 8,287; Referee: Mark Clattenburg

30 January 2016 Fourth Round	Bolton Wanderers	1–2	Leeds United	Bolton
15:00 Greenwich Mean Time	Pratley 80'	Report	Doukara 9'; Diagouraga 39'	Stadium: Macron Stadium; Attendance: 17,336; Referee: Andre Marriner

=== League Cup ===
11 August 2015 First round	Bolton Wanderers	0–1	Burton Albion	Bolton
20:00 BST		Report	Palmer 87'	Stadium: Macron Stadium; Attendance: 5,842; Referee: Richard Clark

=== Mid-season friendlies ===
5 September 2015 Keith Lasley Testimonial	Motherwell	1–2	Bolton Wanderers	Motherwell
15:00 BST	Alfie Lasley 90'	Report	Heskey 51'; Dobbie 90'	Stadium: Fir Park; Attendance: 2352

== Transfers ==
=== Transfers in ===
Date from	Position	Nationality	Name	From	Fee	Ref.
1 July 2015	GK	ENG	Ben Amos	Manchester United	Free transfer	
1 July 2015	CF	ENG	Gary Madine	Sheffield Wednesday	Free transfer	
6 July 2015	CB	ESP	Derik Osede	Real Madrid	Free transfer	
12 July 2015	CM	ESP	Jon Ceberio	Real Sociedad	Free transfer	
12 July 2015	CM	ENG	Jordan Lussey	Liverpool	Free transfer	
5 August 2015	SS	SCO	Stephen Dobbie	Crystal Palace	Free transfer	
5 August 2015	RB	ENG	Lawrie Wilson	Charlton Athletic	Free transfer	
20 August 2015	RB	ITA	Francesco Pisano	Cagliari	Free transfer	
27 August 2015	LB	ESP	José Manuel Casado	Almería	Free transfer	
5 September 2015	GK	ENG	Paul Rachubka	Crewe Alexandra	Free transfer	
23 October 2015	CF	Nigeria	Shola Ameobi	Crystal Palace	Free transfer	

=== Transfers out ===
Date from	Position	Nationality	Name	To	Fee	Ref.
1 July 2015	CM	IRL	Keith Andrews	Free agent	Released	
1 July 2015	CB	ENG	James Ball	Free agent	Released	
1 July 2015	CF	JAM	Jermaine Beckford	Preston North End (Note: Following Beckford's release he joined Preston North End.)	Free transfer	
1 July 2015	GK	HUN	Ádám Bogdán	Liverpool	Free transfer	
1 July 2015	CF	WAL	Craig Davies	Wigan Athletic (Note: Following Davies' release he joined Wigan Athletic.)	Free transfer	
1 July 2015	CM	BUL	Georg Iliev	Free agent	Released	
1 July 2015	MF	ENG	Carl Kennedy	Free agent	Released	
1 July 2015	RM	NIR	Chris Lester	Free agent	Released	
1 July 2015	GK	ENG	Andy Lonergan	Fulham (Note: Following Lonergan's release he joined Fulham.)	Free transfer	
1 July 2015	RB	ENG	Glenn Matthews	Free agent	Released	
1 July 2015	CB	ENG	Matt Mills	Nottingham Forest (Note: Following Mills' release he joined Nottingham Forest.)	Free transfer	
1 July 2015	DF	ENG	Kieran Nolan	Free agent	Released	
1 July 2015	DF	ENG	Ryan Sellers	Wycombe Wanderers (Note: Following Sellers' release he joined Wycombe Wanderers.)	Free transfer	
1 July 2015	CM	PHI	Luke Woodland	Free agent	Released	
3 July 2015	CF	ISL	Eiður Guðjohnsen	Shijiazhuang Ever Bright	Free transfer	
6 July 2015	RB	ENG	Alex Baptiste	Middlesbrough	£75,000	
6 July 2015	LW	ENG	Sanmi Odelusi	Wigan Athletic	£50,000	
20 August 2015	CB	USA	Tim Ream	Fulham	£1,400,000	
1 September 2015	LB	ENG	Andy Kellett	Wigan Athletic	Undisclosed	
26 January 2016	CF	NGA	Shola Ameobi	Fleetwood Town (Note: Following Ameobi's release he joined Fleetwood Town.)	Free transfer	
29 January 2016	LB	ESP	José Manuel Casado	Free agent	Released	

Total income: ▲£1,525,000

=== Loans in ===
Date from	Position	Nationality	Name	From	Date until	Ref.
7 August 2015	CB	FRA	Prince-Désir Gouano	Atalanta	31 January 2016	
20 August 2015	FW	BRA	Wellington Silva	Arsenal	End of season	
26 October 2015	MF	AUS	Luke Brattan	Manchester City	21 December 2015	

=== Loans out ===
Date from	Position	Nationality	Name	To	Date until	Ref.
10 July 2015	CF	IRL	Conor Wilkinson	Barnsley	4 January 2016	
28 July 2015	CF	ENG	Robert Hall	Milton Keynes Dons	End of season	
27 August 2015	CB	ENG	Oscar Threlkeld	Plymouth Argyle	2 January 2016	
19 October 2015	DF	ENG	Hayden White	Blackpool	2 January 2016	
24 October 2015	MF	ENG	Liam Trotter	Nottingham Forest	12 December 2015	
26 November 2015	MF	ENG	Jordan Lussey	York City	26 December 2015	
2 January 2016	DF	ENG	Lawrie Wilson	Peterborough United	31 January 2016	
21 January 2016	FW	IRL	Conor Wilkinson	Newport County	19 March 2016	
31 January 2016	DF	ITA	Francesco Pisano	Avellino	End of season	
15 March 2016	DF	ENG	Quade Taylor	Dagenham & Redbridge	End of season	
17 March 2016	MF	ENG	Liam Feeney	Ipswich Town	End of season	
23 March 2016	FW	IRL	Conor Wilkinson	Portsmouth	End of season	

== Squad ==
No.	Name	Pos.	Nationality	Place of birth	Age	Apps	Goals	Signed from	Date signed	Fee	End
Goalkeepers
1	Ben Amos	GK	(England)	Macclesfield	26	25	0	Manchester United	1 July 2015	Free	2019
13	Paul Rachubka	GK	(England)	San Luis Obispo	35	0	0	Crewe Alexandra	5 September 2015	Free	2016
Defenders
3	Dean Moxey	LB	(England)	Exeter	30	41	1	Crystal Palace	2 July 2014	Free	2017
4	Dorian Dervite	CB	(France)	Lille	27	59	1	Charlton Athletic	27 May 2014	Free	2017
15	Derik Osede	CB	(Spain)	Madrid	23	8	0	Real Madrid	6 July 2015	Free	2018
24	Francesco Pisano	RB	(Italy)	Cagliari	30	3	0	Cagliari	20 August 2015	Free	2017
25	Lawrie Wilson	RB	(England)	Collier Row	28	9	0	Charlton Athletic	5 August 2015	Free	2017
31	David Wheater	CB	(England)	Redcar	29	106	4	Middlesbrough	20 January 2011	£2,300,000	2016
45	Rob Holding	CB	(England)	Tameside	20	7	0	Academy	1 July 2015	Trainee	Undisclosed
Midfielders
6	Josh Vela	CM/RB	(England)	Salford	22	58	1	Academy	20 March 2011	Trainee	Undisclosed
7	Liam Feeney	RM	(England)	Hammersmith	29	77	7	Millwall	1 July 2014	Free	2016
8	Jay Spearing	DM	(England)	Wallasey	27	120	5	Liverpool	9 August 2013	Undisclosed	2017
16	Mark Davies	CM	(England)	Willenhall	28	183	16	Wolverhampton Wanderers	26 January 2009	Undisclosed	2017
18	Neil Danns	AM	(Guyana) (England)	Liverpool	33	105	9	Leicester City	1 July 2014	Free	2016
21	Darren Pratley	CM	(England)	Barking	31	133	11	Swansea City	1 July 2011	Free	2018
27	Filip Twardzik	CM	(Czech Republic)	Třinec	23	5	1	Celtic	2 February 2015	Undisclosed	2016
42	Tom Walker	MF	(England)	Salford	20	17	1	Academy	1 July 2014	Trainee	Undisclosed
Forwards
10	Zach Clough	CF	(England)	Denton	21	22	9	Academy	1 July 2013	Trainee	2017
12	Max Clayton	CF	(England)	Crewe	21	17	1	Crewe Alexandra	18 September 2014	£300,000	2017
14	Gary Madine	CF	(England)	Gateshead	25	23	4	Sheffield Wednesday	8 June 2015	Free	2017
19	Emile Heskey	CF	(England)	Leicester	38	50	2	Newcastle Jets	24 December 2014	Free	2016
22	Wellington Silva	WG/SS	(Brazil)	Rio de Janeiro	23	10	1	Arsenal	18 September 2015	Loan	2016
23	Stephen Dobbie	SS/WG	(Scotland)	Glasgow	33	14	1	Crystal Palace	5 August 2015	Free	2016
30	Kaiyne Woolery	MF	(England)	Hackney	21	3	0	Tamworth	14 August 2014	£10,000	2016

=== Statistics ===
As of 29 December 2015

No.	Pos	Nat	Player	Total		Championship		FA Cup		League Cup	
No.	Pos	Nat	Player	Apps	Goals	Apps	Goals	Apps	Goals	Apps	Goals
1	GK	(England) ENG	Ben Amos	43	0	40+0	0	2+0	0	1+0	0
3	DF	(England) ENG	Dean Moxey	37	1	33+0	0	3+0	1	1+0	0
4	DF	(France) FRA	Dorian Dervite	26	1	21+1	1	3+0	0	1+0	0
6	MF	(England) ENG	Josh Vela	35	2	30+1	2	3+0	0	1+0	0
8	MF	(England) ENG	Jay Spearing	23	2	18+4	2	0+1	0	0+0	0
10	FW	(England) ENG	Zach Clough	28	0	24+3	0	0+0	0	1+0	0
12	FW	(England) ENG	Max Clayton	8	0	5+3	0	0+0	0	0+0	0
13	GK	(United States) USA	Paul Rachubka	8	0	6+1	0	1+0	0	0+0	0
14	FW	(England) ENG	Gary Madine	36	6	22+10	5	3+0	1	1+0	0
15	DF	(Spain) ESP	Derik Osede	21	0	20+1	0	0+0	0	0+0	0
16	MF	(England) ENG	Mark Davies	37	0	32+2	0	2+0	0	1+0	0
17	MF	(England) ENG	Liam Trotter	16	1	8+5	1	2+1	0	0+0	0
18	MF	(Guyana) GUY	Neil Danns	30	2	19+9	2	1+0	0	1+0	0
19	FW	(England) ENG	Emile Heskey	28	2	12+15	2	0+0	0	0+1	0
21	MF	(England) ENG	Darren Pratley	37	4	34+0	1	3+0	3	0+0	0
22	FW	(Brazil) BRA	Wellington Silva (on loan from Arsenal)	25	2	14+8	2	3+0	0	0+0	0
23	FW	(Scotland) SCO	Stephen Dobbie	23	3	3+19	3	0+0	0	0+1	0
25	DF	(England) ENG	Lawrie Wilson	11	1	9+1	1	0+0	0	1+0	0
27	MF	(Czech Republic) CZE	Filip Twardzik	2	0	0+2	0	0+0	0	0+0	0
30	FW	(England) ENG	Kaiyne Woolery	18	2	5+10	2	0+3	0	0+0	0
31	DF	(England) ENG	David Wheater	27	1	24+2	1	1+0	0	0+0	0
36	DF	(England) ENG	Alex Finney	2	0	1+1	0	0+0	0	0+0	0
41	DF	(England) ENG	Oscar Threlkeld	2	0	2+0	0	0+0	0	0+0	0
42	MF	(England) ENG	Tom Walker	8	0	3+4	0	0+0	0	0+1	0
43	FW	(Iran) IRI	Alex Samizadeh	1	0	0+1	0	0+0	0	0+0	0
44	DF	(England) ENG	Tyler Garratt	1	0	0+1	0	0+0	0	0+0	0
45	DF	(England) ENG	Rob Holding	29	1	25+0	1	3+0	0	1+0	0
48	DF	(England) ENG	Niall Maher	5	0	5+0	0	0+0	0	0+0	0
Players out on loan:
7	MF	(England) ENG	Liam Feeney	40	5	35+1	5	3+0	0	1+0	0
24	DF	(Italy) ITA	Francesco Pisano	3	0	2+1	0	0+0	0	0+0	0
Players who left the club during the season:
2	DF	(France) FRA	Prince-Désir Gouano (on loan from Atalanta)	19	0	19+0	0	0+0	0	0+0	0
20	DF	(Spain) ESP	José Manuel Casado	9	0	9+0	0	0+0	0	0+0	0
26	FW	(Nigeria) NGR	Shola Ameobi	10	2	6+2	2	0+2	0	0+0	0

=== Goals record ===
As of 7 May 2016

Rank	No.	Po.	Name	Championship	FA Cup	League Cup	Total
1	10	FW	(England) Zach Clough	7	0	0	7
2	14	FW	(England) Gary Madine	5	1	0	6
3	7	MF	(England) Liam Feeney	5	0	0	5
4	21	MF	(England) Darren Pratley	1	3	0	4
5	23	FW	(Scotland) Stephen Dobbie	4	0	0	4
6	6	MF	(England) Josh Vela	2	0	0	2
6	8	MF	(England) Jay Spearing	2	0	0	2
6	18	MF	(Guyana) Neil Danns	2	0	0	2
6	19	FW	(England) Emile Heskey	2	0	0	2
6	22	FW	(Brazil) Wellington Silva	2	0	0	2
6	26	FW	(Nigeria) Shola Ameobi	2	0	0	2
6	30	FW	(England) Kaiyne Woolery	2	0	0	2
13	3	DF	(England) Dean Moxey	0	1	0	1
13	4	DF	(France) Dorian Dervite	1	0	0	1
13	17	MF	(England) Liam Trotter	1	0	0	1
13	25	DF	(England) Lawrie Wilson	1	0	0	1
13	31	DF	(England) David Wheater	1	0	0	1
13	45	DF	(England) Rob Holding	1	0	0	1
Total				41	5	0	46

=== Disciplinary record ===
As of 28 April 2016

No.	Po.	Name	Championship		FA Cup		League Cup		Total	
No.	Po.	Name	Yellow card	Red card	Yellow card	Red card	Yellow card	Red card	Yellow card	Red card
1	GK	(England) Ben Amos	2	1	0	0	0	0	2	1
2	DF	(France) Prince-Désir Gouano	1	0	0	0	0	0	1	0
3	DF	(England) Dean Moxey	6	0	0	0	0	0	6	0
4	DF	(France) Dorian Dervite	2	1	0	0	0	0	2	1
6	MF	(England) Josh Vela	8	0	1	0	0	0	9	0
7	MF	(England) Liam Feeney	1	0	0	0	0	0	1	0
8	MF	(England) Jay Spearing	4	1	0	0	0	0	4	1
10	FW	(England) Zach Clough	1	0	0	0	0	0	1	0
14	FW	(England) Gary Madine	2	0	0	0	0	0	2	0
15	DF	(Spain) Derik Osede	0	1	0	0	0	0	0	1
16	MF	(England) Mark Davies	9	0	0	0	0	0	9	0
17	MF	(England) Liam Trotter	1	0	0	0	0	0	1	0
18	MF	(Guyana) Neil Danns	3	0	1	0	0	0	4	0
20	DF	(Spain) José Manuel Casado	4	1	0	0	0	0	4	1
21	MF	(England) Darren Pratley	9	0	0	0	0	0	9	0
22	FW	(Brazil) Wellington Silva	3	0	0	0	0	0	3	0
23	FW	(Scotland) Stephen Dobbie	1	0	0	0	0	0	1	0
25	DF	(England) Lawrie Wilson	2	0	0	0	0	0	2	0
30	FW	(England) Kaiyne Woolery	0	0	1	0	0	0	1	0
31	DF	(England) David Wheater	2	0	0	0	0	0	2	0
45	DF	(England) Rob Holding	1	1	1	0	1	0	3	1
48	DF	(England) Niall Maher	0	1	0	0	0	0	0	1
Total			61	8	4	0	1	0	66	8

== See also ==
- List of Bolton Wanderers F.C. seasons
