= Otis Khan =

Pakistan international footballer (born 1995)

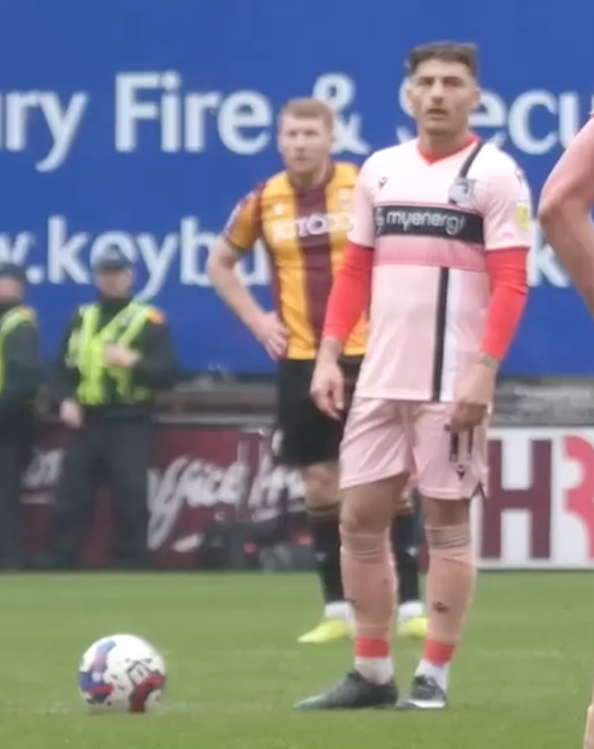
- Khan playing for Grimsby Town in 2023

Personal information
- Full name: Otis Jan Mohammed Khan
- Date of birth: 5 September 1995 (age 31)
- Place of birth: Ashton-under-Lyne, England
- Height: 1.75 m (5 ft 9 in)
- Positions: Winger; attacking midfielder

Team information
- Current team: Altrincham
- Number: 10

Youth career
- 2002–2012: Manchester United
- 2012–2013: Sheffield United

Senior career*
Years	Team	Apps	(Gls)
2013–2016	Sheffield United	2	(0)
2013–2014	→ Buxton (loan)	2	(0)
2015	→ Matlock Town (loan)	16	(5)
2015–2016	→ Barrow (loan)	8	(4)
2016	Barnsley	3	(0)
2016–2018	Yeovil Town	67	(12)
2018–2020	Mansfield Town	43	(3)
2020	→ Newport County (loan)	5	(0)
2020–2021	Tranmere Rovers	35	(2)
2021–2022	Walsall	7	(2)
2022	Leyton Orient	20	(1)
2022–2024	Grimsby Town	43	(3)
2024	→ Hartlepool United (loan)	1	(0)
2024–2025	Oldham Athletic	7	(1)
2025	→ Yeovil Town (loan)	5	(0)
2025	Kelantan Red Warrior	8	(0)
2026–	Altrincham	9	(1)

International career^{‡}
2023–	Pakistan	15	(0)
- * Club domestic league appearances and goals as of 00:03, 26 April 2026 (UTC) ‡ National team caps and goals as of 23:00, 10 June 2026 (UTC)

Otis Jan Mohammed Khan (born 5 September 1995) is a professional footballer who plays as a winger for National League club Altrincham. Born in England, he represents the Pakistan national team.

Khan came through the youth academy at Manchester United before going on to turn professional for Sheffield United. He has also played professionally for Barnsley, Yeovil Town, Mansfield Town, Newport County, Tranmere Rovers, Walsall and Leyton Orient. He has also spent brief loan spells at non-League sides Buxton, Matlock Town and Barrow.

He made his international debut with Pakistan, following a call up in May 2023 for the 2023 Mauritius Four Nations Cup.

== Club career ==
=== Early career ===
Khan started his career in Manchester United's youth system before joining Sheffield United's academy in the summer of 2012. Khan made his first team début in March 2014 in an away game at Crawley Town.

While at Sheffield United, Khan played on loan at Buxton before joining Matlock Town on loan on 16 January 2015.

On 30 October 2015, he was loaned to Barrow on a one-month deal. He made his debut scoring a goal in a 3–1 home defeat against Grimsby Town. Afterwards, he scored two goals in a 4–0 victory against Torquay United, earning the man-of-the-match accolade. He scored his last goal with Barrow against Southport on 28 December 2015, finishing with 4 goals in 8 appearances during his stint at the team.

=== Barnsley ===
Khan was released from his contract by Sheffield United on 25 January 2016. That same day, League One side Barnsley announced that Khan had signed an 18-month deal with the club after a successful trial.

=== Yeovil Town ===
On 30 June 2016, Khan joined Football League Two side Yeovil Town on a one-year deal. Khan scored on his debut for Yeovil in a 2–0 opening day victory against Notts County.

=== Mansfield Town ===
On 29 June 2018, Khan signed for fellow League Two side Mansfield Town for an undisclosed fee. He scored twice in his debut in a 3–0 victory against Newport County at Field Mill.

On January deadline day 2020, Khan joined fellow League Two side Newport County on a six-month loan. He made his debut for Newport as a second-half substitute in the 1–0 defeat against Cambridge United on 8 February 2020. He was released by Mansfield at the end of the 2019–20 season.

=== Tranmere Rovers ===
On 10 August 2020, following his release from Mansfield, Khan joined League Two club Tranmere Rovers on a one-year deal, turning down offers from League One clubs. He started in the 2021 EFL Trophy final at Wembley Stadium as Tranmere were defeated 1–0 by Sunderland.

=== Walsall ===
On 18 October 2021, Khan joined League Two side Walsall on a short-term deal. On 19 January 2022, Khan left the club following the expiration of his short-term deal.

=== Leyton Orient ===
Later that same day of his departure from Walsall, Khan signed an 18-month contract with League Two side Leyton Orient.

=== Grimsby Town ===
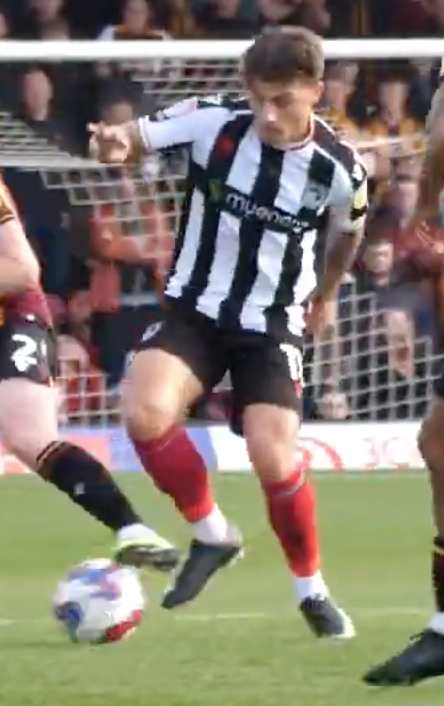
Khan in a match against Bradford City AFC in October 2022

On 1 July 2022, Khan joined newly promoted League Two club Grimsby Town on a two-year deal.

Khan was part of the Grimsby team that reached the FA Cup quarter-finals for the first time since 1939. He scored twice in the 2–1 away victory over Cambridge United in the second round, and came on as substitute in the 2–1 win away at Premier League side Southampton that secured that achievement. He started in the quarter-final against Brighton & Hove Albion which Grimsby lost 5–0.

On 25 January 2024, it was announced that Khan had signed for National League club Hartlepool United on loan until the end of the season.

Following his return from loan, Khan was released from Grimsby Town at the end of the 2023–24 season.

=== Oldham Athletic ===
In August 2024, Khan began training with National League club Oldham Athletic on trial, and he played in several friendlies. On 29 August 2024, the club announced the signing of Khan on a one-year deal.

On 21 March 2025, Khan rejoined National League side Yeovil Town on loan until the end of the season.

=== Kelantan Red Warrior ===
On 12 July 2025, Khan moved to Malaysia A1 Semi-Pro League club Kelantan Red Warrior, becoming the third Pakistani international to play in Malaysia after Muhammad Amin and Zesh Rehman. Khan made eight appearances for the club, during which he provided one assist.

On 7 November 2025, Khan and the club mutually agreed to terminate his contract, with the club stating that their local players were already highly capable. The club subsequently planned to recruit stronger foreign players for the upcoming transfer window.

=== Altrincham ===
On 7 January 2026, Khan returned to England, joining National League club Altrincham on an eighteen-month deal.

== International career ==
Khan is eligible to play for both India and Pakistan, the former as it is the birthplace of his grandfather, and the latter due to citizenship as his grandfather moved to Pakistan after the partition in 1947. In January 2015, Khan was called up to play for Pakistan in a friendly against Afghanistan but he missed the match as he did not get the necessary visas and vaccinations; he was however confirmed selected for the 2018 FIFA World Cup qualifying matches in March 2015.

Khan then declined to consider any call-ups to the Pakistan national side in the hope of playing for England in the future. However, by 2022, due to continued appearances in the lower leagues restricting any England prospects, Khan had a change of heart and rekindled his interest to represent Pakistan internationally. Khan was called up by Pakistan manager Shahzad Anwar alongside fellow English-Pakistani players Adil Nabi and Easah Suliman for the June window as well as the 2023 SAFF Championship. On 23 May 2023, the Pakistan Football Federation confirmed that Khan was given international clearance by FIFA to represent Pakistan.

Khan made his Pakistan debut on 11 June 2023, in a 3–0 defeat against Mauritius at the 2023 Mauritius Four Nations Cup.

In October 2023 he was ruled ineligible to represent Pakistan, on the basis that his grandfather had been born in Delhi and later moved to Pakistan following the partition of India, but in November he was deemed eligible.

On 16 November 2023, Khan captained the Pakistan side for the first time in their FIFA World Cup qualification match against Saudi Arabia, which ended in a 4–0 loss.

== Personal life ==
Khan's paternal grandfather was born in New Delhi, India and migrated to Faisalabad, Pakistan following the 1947 partition. He later settled in England with his wife, Otis' grandmother, who was from the Gorton area of Manchester.

In 2016, Khan appeared on the second series of the ITV assault course game show Ninja Warrior UK, completing the course in a time of 2:41.

In 2024, Khan was named as brand ambassador of the Pakistan Super League cricket team Multan Sultans alongside Fatima Sana.

== Career statistics ==
=== Club ===
As of end of 2025–26 season

Appearances and goals by club, season and competition
Club	Season	League			FA Cup		League Cup		Other		Total	
Club	Season	Division	Apps	Goals	Apps	Goals	Apps	Goals	Apps	Goals	Apps	Goals
Sheffield United	2013–14	League One	2	0	0	0	0	0	0	0	2	0
Sheffield United	2014–15	League One	0	0	0	0	0	0	0	0	0	0
Sheffield United	2015–16	League One	0	0	0	0	0	0	0	0	0	0
Sheffield United	Total		2	0	0	0	0	0	0	0	2	0
Buxton (loan)	2013–14	NPL Premier Division	2	0	0	0	—		0	0	2	0
Matlock Town (loan)	2014–15	NPL Premier Division	16	5	0	0	—		1 (Note: Appearance in Derbyshire Senior Cup)	1	17	6
Barrow (loan)	2015–16	National League	8	4	0	0	—		0	0	8	4
Barnsley	2015–16	League One	3	0	0	0	0	0	0	0	3	0
Yeovil Town	2016–17	League Two	29	6	2	1	2	0	5 (Note: Appearance(s) in EFL Trophy)	1	38	8
Yeovil Town	2017–18	League Two	38	6	4	3	1	0	6	1	49	10
Yeovil Town	Total		67	12	6	4	3	0	11	2	87	18
Mansfield Town	2018–19	League Two	22	2	0	0	2	1	2	0	26	3
Mansfield Town	2019–20	League Two	21	1	2	0	1	0	3	0	27	1
Mansfield Town	Total		43	3	2	0	3	1	5	0	53	4
Newport County (loan)	2019–20	League Two	5	0	—		—		—		5	0
Tranmere Rovers	2020–21	League Two	35	2	3	0	1	0	10 (Note: Eight appearances in EFL Trophy, two appearances in League Two play-offs)	0	49	2
Walsall	2021–22	League Two	7	2	1	0	0	0	2	0	10	2
Leyton Orient	2021–22	League Two	20	1	—		—		—		20	1
Grimsby Town	2022–23	League Two	31	3	5	2	0	0	3	1	39	6
Grimsby Town	2023–24	League Two	12	0	1	0	0	0	0	0	13	0
Grimsby Town	Total		43	3	6	2	0	0	3	1	52	6
Hartlepool United (loan)	2023–24	National League	1	0	—		—		0	0	1	0
Oldham Athletic	2024–25	National League	7	1	2	0	—		5 (Note: Two appearances in FA Trophy, four appearances in National League Cup)	0	14	1
Yeovil Town (loan)	2024–25	National League	5	0	—		—		—		5	0
Altrincham	2025–26	National League	9	1	0	0	—		0	0	9	1
Career total			273	34	20	6	7	1	37	4	337	45

=== International ===
As of match played 10 June 2026

Appearances and goals by national team and year
National team	Year	Apps	Goals
Pakistan	2023	8	0
Pakistan	2024	1	0
Pakistan	2025	3	0
Pakistan	2026	3	0
Total		15	0

== Honours ==
Tranmere Rovers

- EFL Trophy runner-up: 2020–21

Pakistan

- Diamond Jubilee International Football Tournament: 2026

== See also ==
- British Asians in association football
- List of Pakistan international footballers born outside Pakistan
- List of Pakistan national football team captains
