= 2020–21 Tranmere Rovers F.C. season =

Tranmere Rovers
2020–21 season
- Chairman: Mark Palios
- Manager: Mike Jackson (until 31 October); Keith Hill (until 11 May); Ian Dawes
- Stadium: Prenton Park
- League Two: 7th (promotion play-offs)
- FA Cup: Third round
- EFL Cup: First round
- EFL Trophy: Runners-up
- Top goalscorer: League: James Vaughan (18); All: James Vaughan (21)
Home colours	Away colours

The 2020–21 Tranmere Rovers F.C. season was the 137th season of Tranmere Rovers' existence and their first season return in EFL League Two having been relegated after the premature conclusion of the 2019-20 season due to COVID-19. Along with League Two, the club contested in the FA Cup, EFL Cup and EFL Trophy. The season covered the period from 1 July 2020 to 30 June 2021.

== Transfers ==
=== Transfers in ===
Date	Position	Nationality	Name	From	Fee	Ref.
5 August 2020	DM	(England)	Jay Spearing	(England) Blackpool	Free transfer	
10 August 2020	LW	(England)	Otis Khan	(England) Mansfield Town	Free transfer	
11 August 2020	CF	(England)	James Vaughan	(England) Bradford City	Free transfer	
17 August 2020	CM	(England)	Paul Lewis	(England) Cambridge United	Free transfer	
22 August 2020	GK	(Republic of Ireland)	Joe Murphy	(England) Shrewsbury Town	Free transfer	
14 September 2020	LW	(England)	Kaiyne Woolery	(England) Swindon Town	Free transfer	
10 November 2020	RW	(England)	Danny Lloyd	(England) Salford City	Free transfer	
25 January 2021	CF	(England)	Charlie Jolley	(England) Wigan Athletic	Undisclosed	

=== Loans in ===
Date from	Position	Nationality	Name	From	Date until	Ref.
17 August 2020	CB	(Republic of Ireland)	Lee O'Connor	(Scotland) Celtic	30 June 2021	
19 August 2020	LB	(Scotland)	Calum Macdonald	(England) Blackpool	30 June 2021	
17 September 2020	RW	(England)	Liam Feeney	(England) Blackpool	30 June 2021	
14 October 2020	DM	(England)	Jack Young	(England) Newcastle United	End of season	
16 October 2020	CF	(England)	Sam Smith	(England) Reading	January 2021	
22 January 2021	CM	(England)	Nya Kirby	(England) Crystal Palace	End of season	
1 February 2021	CM	(Scotland)	Ali Crawford	(England) Bolton Wanderers	End of season	
1 February 2021	CF	(England)	David Nugent	(England) Preston North End	End of season	

=== Loans out ===
Date from	Position	Nationality	Name	To	Date until	Ref.
8 March 2021	CB	(England)	Mark Ellis	(England) Notts County	End of season	

=== Transfers out ===
Date	Position	Nationality	Name	To	Fee	Ref.
1 July 2020	CF	(England)	Connor Jennings	(England) Stockport County	Free Transfer	
1 July 2020	FW	(England)	Bailey Thompson	(England) Tadcaster Albion	Free Transfer	
20 July 2020	CF	(England)	Paul Mullin	(England) Cambridge United	Free transfer	
1 August 2020	DM	(Northern Ireland)	Luke McCullough	(Northern Ireland) Glentoran	Free transfer	
6 August 2020	RB	(England)	Jake Caprice	(England) Exeter City	Free transfer	
7 August 2020	RB	(England)	Evan Gumbs	(England) Warrington Town	Free transfer	
17 August 2020	DM	(England)	David Perkins	(England) AFC Fylde	Free transfer	
22 August 2020	CM	(England)	Harvey Gilmour	(England) Stockport County	Free Transfer	
4 September 2020	GK	(Wales)	Luke Pilling	(England) Notts County	Free transfer	
16 October 2020	CM	(Guyana)	Neil Danns	(England) Radcliffe	Free transfer	
22 October 2020	CM	(Republic of Ireland)	Darren Potter	(England) Altrincham	Free transfer	
18 January 2021	CM	(England)	Ollie Banks	(England) Barrow	Undisclosed	
25 January 2021	CF	(England)	Stefan Payne	(England) Grimsby Town	Free transfer	
11 February 2021	CF	(England)	Morgan Ferrier	(Israel) Maccabi Petah Tikva	Undisclosed	

== Pre-season ==
Win Draw Loss Postponed

18 August 2020 Friendly	Tranmere Rovers	0–1	The New Saints	Leasowe
14:00 BST		Report	75'	Stadium: Solar Campus; Attendance: 0

22 August 2020 Friendly	Tranmere Rovers	0–3	Warrington Town	Birkenhead
15:00 BST		Report	Buckley 49'; Dixon 75'; Mackreth 90' (pen.)	Stadium: Prenton Park; Attendance: 0

25 August 2020 Friendly	Tranmere Rovers	1–1	Preston North End	Birkenhead
15:00 BST	Payne 89'	Report	Barkhuizen 32'	Stadium: Prenton Park; Attendance: 0

== Competitions ==
=== League Two ===
==== League table ====
Pos	Team	Pld	W	D	L	GF	GA	GD	Pts	Promotion, qualification or relegation
3	Bolton Wanderers (P)	46	23	10	13	59	50	+9	79	Promotion to the EFL League One
4	Morecambe (O, P)	46	23	9	14	69	58	+11	78	Qualification for League Two play-offs
5	Newport County	46	20	13	13	57	42	+15	73	Qualification for League Two play-offs
6	Forest Green Rovers	46	20	13	13	59	51	+8	73	Qualification for League Two play-offs
7	Tranmere Rovers	46	20	13	13	55	50	+5	73	Qualification for League Two play-offs
8	Salford City	46	19	14	13	54	34	+20	71	
9	Exeter City	46	18	16	12	71	50	+21	70	
10	Carlisle United	46	18	12	16	60	51	+9	66	
11	Leyton Orient	46	17	10	19	53	55	−2	61	

Updated to match(es) played on 31 May 2021. Source: EFL Official Website
Rules for classification: 1) Points; 2) Goal difference; 3) Number of goals scored; 4) Head-to-head results; 5) Wins; 6) Away goals; 7) Penalty points (sec 9.5); 8) 12-point sending off offences
(O) Play-off winners; (P) Promoted

==== Result summary ====
Overall								Home						Away					
Pld	W	D	L	GF	GA	GD	Pts	W	D	L	GF	GA	GD	W	D	L	GF	GA	GD
46	20	13	13	55	50	+5	73	11	5	7	30	22	+8	9	8	6	25	28	−3

Last updated: 8 May 2021.

==== Results by matchday ====
Matchday	1	2	3	4	5	6	7	8	9	10	11	12	13	14	15	16	17	18	19	20	21	22	23	24	25	26	27	28	29	30	31	32	33	34	35	36	37	38	39	40	41	42	43	44	45	46
Ground	A	H	A	H	A	A	H	H	A	H	A	A	H	H	A	H	A	A	H	A	A	H	H	H	A	H	H	H	A	A	H	H	A	A	H	A	H	A	H	A	A	H	A	H	A	H
Result	D	L	D	W	D	L	L	W	L	L	W	W	W	W	W	L	L	W	L	D	D	W	W	W	W	W	L	D	W	W	W	L	W	D	W	D	D	L	D	D	L	D	W	W	L	D
Position	17	20	20	15	13	16	17	16	17	18	19	15	13	9	8	10	12	13	13	13	15	11	11	8	5	3	4	6	5	4	4	5	4	4	4	4	3	4	3	4	5	5	5	5	6	7

Updated to match(es) played on 8 May 2021. Source: 11v11 for league tables and fixtures
A = Away; H = Home; W = Win; D = Draw; L = Loss

==== Matches ====
Win Draw Loss Postponed

The 2020–21 season fixtures were released on 21 August.

12 September 2020 1	Mansfield Town	0–0	Tranmere Rovers	Mansfield
15:00 BST		Report		Stadium: One Call Stadium; Attendance: 0 Referee: James Bell

19 September 2020 2	Tranmere Rovers	0–3	Cheltenham Town	Birkenhead
15:00 BST	Vaughan (yellow card) 44'; Lewis (yellow card) 90+1'	Report	Raglan 6'; Williams 20'; Lewis 39' (o.g.); Sercombe (yellow card) 88'; Blair (yellow card) 88'	Stadium: Prenton Park; Attendance: 0 Referee: Carl Boyeson

26 September 2020 3	Cambridge United	0–0	Tranmere Rovers	Cambridge
15:00 BST	Cundy (yellow card) 53'; Ironside (yellow card) 67'; Knoyle (yellow card) 79'	Report		Stadium: Abbey Stadium; Attendance: 0 Referee: Sam Purkiss

3 October 2020 4	Tranmere Rovers	2–0	Scunthorpe United	Birkenhead
15:00 BST	Vaughan 41', 66'; Morris (yellow card) 53'; Davies (yellow card) 87'	Report	Hornshaw (yellow card) 71'; Bedeau (yellow card) 85'	Stadium: Prenton Park; Attendance: 0 Referee: Anthony Backhouse

10 October 2020 5	Salford City	2–2	Tranmere Rovers	Salford
15:00 BST	Towell 2'; Wilson 20'	Report	Khan (yellow card) 6'; Morris (yellow card) 45+1' (goal) 86'; Lewis (yellow card) 48' (goal) 90+3'	Stadium: Moor Lane; Attendance: 0 Referee: Sam Allison

17 October 2020 6	Newport County	1–0	Tranmere Rovers	Newport
15:00 BST	Janneh 25'; Sheehan (yellow card) 38'	Report	Banks (yellow card) 21'; Lewis (red card) 52'	Stadium: Rodney Parade; Attendance: 0 Referee: Antony Coggins

20 October 2020 7	Tranmere Rovers	0–1	Leyton Orient	Birkenhead
19:00 BST		Report	Johnson 71'	Stadium: Prenton Park; Attendance: 0 Referee: Sam Barrott

24 October 2020 8	Tranmere Rovers	2–0	Southend United	Birkenhead
15:00 BST	Clarke 31'; Vaughan 52' (yellow card) 83'	Report		Stadium: Prenton Park; Attendance: 0 Referee: Andy Woolmer

27 October 2020 9	Crawley Town	4–0	Tranmere Rovers	Crawley
18:30 GMT	Watters 13'; Nichols 21'; Tunnicliffe 24'; Frost 77'	Report	Smith (yellow card) 55'; Vaughan (yellow card) 61'; Macdonald (yellow card) 79'	Stadium: The People's Pension Stadium; Attendance: 0 Referee: James Oldham

31 October 2020 10	Tranmere Rovers	0–1	Morecambe	Birkenhead
15:00 GMT	Khan (yellow card) 50'	Report	Phillips 57' (pen.)	Stadium: Prenton Park; Attendance: 0 Referee: Craig Hicks

3 November 2020 11	Harrogate Town	0–1	Tranmere Rovers	Harrogate
19:00 GMT	Kirby (yellow card) 58'	Report	Monthé (yellow card) 65'; Khan 79'	Stadium: The EnviroVent Stadium; Attendance: 0 Referee: Ross Joyce

14 November 2020 12	Port Vale	3–4	Tranmere Rovers	Burslem
15:00 GMT	Conlon 16' (pen.); Amoo 24'; Joyce (red card) 52'; Brown (yellow card) 54'; Legge (yellow card) 59'; Rodney 75'	Report	Davies (yellow card) 45+2'; Vaughan 58', 71' (pen.); Woolery 90+3'; Morris 90+6'	Stadium: Vale Park; Attendance: 0 Referee: Carl Brook

21 November 2020 13	Tranmere Rovers	5–0	Grimsby Town	Birkenhead
15:00 GMT	Vaughan 10', 29' (pen.); Clarke 27'; Khan 34'; Monthé (yellow card) 79'; Lewis 86'	Report	Hendrie (yellow card) 35'; Waterfall (yellow card) 65'	Stadium: Prenton Park; Attendance: 0 Referee: Marc Edwards

24 November 2020 14	Tranmere Rovers	1–0	Carlisle United	Birkenhead
19:00 GMT	Blackett-Taylor 51'; Monthé (yellow card) 54'; Lewis (yellow card) 69'	Report	Hayden (yellow card) 67'	Stadium: Prenton Park; Attendance: 0 Referee: David Rock

1 December 2020 15	Oldham Athletic	0–1	Tranmere Rovers	Oldham
19:00 GMT	Piergianni (yellow card) 25'; Ntambwe (yellow card) 61'; Barnett (yellow card) 84'	Report	Spearing (yellow card) 16'; Vaughan 27'	Stadium: Boundary Park; Attendance: 0 Referee: Alan Young

5 December 2020 16	Tranmere Rovers	1–3	Walsall	Birkenhead
15:00 GMT	Feeney 31'	Report	Adebayo 19'; McDonald 48'; Scarr 67'	Stadium: Prenton Park; Attendance: 2,000; Referee: Martin Coy

12 December 2020 17	Exeter City	5–0	Tranmere Rovers	Exeter
15:00 GMT	Bowman 8', 27', 77'; Jay 18' (pen.); Parkes (yellow card) 49'; Taylor 73'	Report	Macdonald (yellow card) 41'; Clarke (yellow card) 62'; Davies (yellow card) 73'	Stadium: St James Park; Attendance: 1,630; Referee: Kevin Johnson

19 December 2020 18	Bolton Wanderers	0–3	Tranmere Rovers	Bolton
15:00 BST		Report	Clarke 28'; Morris 68'; Vaughan 75' (pen.)	Stadium: University of Bolton Stadium; Attendance: 0 Referee: Charles Breakspear

26 December 2020 19	Tranmere Rovers	0–1	Bradford City	Birkenhead
15:00 GMT		Report	Evans (yellow card) 12'; Wood (yellow card) 35'; Novak 62'	Stadium: Prenton Park; Attendance: 2,000; Referee: Ben Toner

29 December 2020 20	Barrow	1–1	Tranmere Rovers	Barrow-in-Furness
19:45 GMT	Brough (yellow card) 45+1'; Biggins (yellow card) 53' (yellow-red card) 68'; Quigley 65' (pen.)	Report	Vaughan 23' (yellow card) 68'; Feeney (yellow card) 60'	Stadium: Furness Building Society Stadium; Attendance: 1,131; Referee: James Bell

16 January 2021 21	Stevenage	0–0	Tranmere Rovers	Stevenage
15:00 GMT		Report	Spearing (yellow card) 65'; Vaughan (yellow card) 90+1'	Stadium: Lamex Stadium; Attendance: 0 Referee: Lee Swabey

19 January 2021 22	Tranmere Rovers	3–2	Forest Green Rovers	Birkenhead
19:00 GMT	Lewis 12'; Vaughan 47'; Feeney 76'; Davies (yellow card) 87'; Ferrier (yellow card) 90+2'	Report	Whitehouse 65', (yellow card) 72'; Wagstaff (yellow card) 90+2', (goal) 90+3'	Stadium: Prenton Park; Attendance: 0 Referee: Darren Drysdale

23 January 2021 23	Tranmere Rovers	2–1	Bolton Wanderers	Birkenhead
15:00 GMT	Lloyd 4'; Monthé (yellow card) 40'; Vaughan 56' (pen.); Clarke (yellow card) 57'	Report	Delaney (yellow card) 55' (yellow-red card) 75'; Sarcevic 66'	Stadium: Prenton Park; Attendance: 0 Referee: Neil Hair

26 January 2021 24	Tranmere Rovers	3–2	Harrogate Town	Birkenhead
19:00 GMT	Vaughan 36' (pen.) 53' (yellow card) 90'; Woolery 51'; MacDonald (yellow card) 57'; Lewis (yellow card) 86'	Report	McPake 25'; Hall (yellow card) 35' (yellow-red card) 69'; March 72'	Stadium: Prenton Park; Attendance: 0 Referee: Andy Haines

30 January 2021 25	Morecambe	0–1	Tranmere Rovers	Morecambe
15:00 GMT	Phillips (penalty missed) 38'; Songo'o (red card) 45'; Cooney (yellow card) 62'; Hendrie (yellow card) 90+3'	Report	Spearing (yellow card) 65'; Woolery 74'	Stadium: Mazuma Stadium; Attendance: 0 Referee: Paul Howard

6 February 2021 26	Tranmere Rovers	3–1	Port Vale	Birkenhead
15:00 GMT	Woolery 17'; Vaughan 30' 59' (yellow card) 90+3'		Taylor 41'; Montaño (yellow card) 71'; Guthrie (yellow card) 72'	Stadium: Prenton Park; Attendance: 0 Referee: Alan Young

9 February 2021 27	Tranmere Rovers	0–1	Stevenage	Birkenhead
19:00 GMT	Spearing (yellow card) 79'	Report	Newton 82'	Stadium: Prenton Park; Attendance: 0 Referee: Robert Madley

20 February 2021 28	Tranmere Rovers	2–2	Oldham Athletic	Birkenhead
15:00 GMT	Clarke (yellow card) 8'; Vaughan (penalty missed) 39'; Macdonald 42'; Woolery (yellow card) 44', (goal) 51'; Lewis (yellow card) 90+4'	Report	Keillor-Dunn 2', (yellow card) 31'; Jombati (yellow card) 8' (yellow-red card) 47'; Bahamboula 78'; Blackwood (yellow card) 87'	Stadium: Prenton Park; Attendance: 0 Referee: Seb Stockbridge

23 February 2021 29	Carlisle United	2–3	Tranmere Rovers	Carlisle
19:00 GMT	Kayode 3'; Anderton 27'	Report	Lewis (yellow card) 12'; Woolery 21'; Vaughan 43', 88'	Stadium: Brunton Park; Attendance: 0 Referee: Ben Speedie

27 February 2021 30	Leyton Orient	1–3	Tranmere Rovers	Leyton
15:00 GMT	McAnuff (yellow card) 41'; Turley 68'; Akinola (yellow card) 71'	Report	Lewis 24'; Woolery 56'; Morris 63'; Vaughan (yellow card) 73'; Feeney (yellow card) 90+5'	Stadium: Breyer Group Stadium; Attendance: 0 Referee: Antony Coggins

2 March 2021 31	Tranmere Rovers	1–0	Newport County	Birkenhead
19:00 GMT	Feeney 7'; Spearing (yellow card) 79'; Lloyd (yellow card) 90+3'	Report		Stadium: Prenton Park; Attendance: 0 Referee: Ben Toner

6 March 2021 32	Tranmere Rovers	0–1	Crawley Town	Birkenhead
15:00 GMT	Clarke (yellow card) 14'	Report	Nadesan (yellow card) 19'; Nichols 58'	Stadium: Prenton Park; Attendance: 0 Referee: Chris Pollard

9 March 2021 33	Southend United	0–2	Tranmere Rovers	Southend-on-Sea
19:00 GMT	White (yellow card) 55'; Hackett-Fairchild (yellow card) 86'	Report	Lewis 8'; Ray 24'	Stadium: Roots Hall; Attendance: 0 Referee: Tim Robinson

17 March 2021 34	Grimsby Town	0–0	Tranmere Rovers	Cleethorpes
19:00 GMT	Lamy (yellow card) 8'; Clifton (yellow card) 60'	Report	Blackett-Taylor (yellow card) 47'; Ridehalgh (yellow card) 71'	Stadium: Blundell Park; Attendance: 0 Referee: Robert Lewis

20 March 2021 35	Tranmere Rovers	2–1	Exeter City	Birkenhead
15:00 BST	Nugent 18' (pen.); Lloyd 68' (pen.); Lewis (yellow card) 74'	Report	Randall 20'	Stadium: Prenton Park; Attendance: 0 Referee: Paul Howard

23 March 2021 36	Colchester United	2–2	Tranmere Rovers	Colchester
19:00 GMT	Pell (yellow card) 9', (goal) 30'; Sarpong-Wiredu 55', (yellow card) 65'	Report	Khan (yellow card) 50'; Lloyd 62' (pen.); Spearing 67'	Stadium: JobServe Community Stadium; Attendance: 0 Referee: Declan Bourne

27 March 2021 37	Tranmere Rovers	1–1	Mansfield Town	Birkenhead
15:00 BST	Woolery 45+3'; Spearing (yellow card) 59'; Khan (yellow card) 89'	Report	Law (yellow card) 68'; Quinn 76'	Stadium: Prenton Park; Attendance: 0 Referee: Will Finnie

2 April 2021 38	Cheltenham Town	4–0	Tranmere Rovers	Cheltenham
15:00 BST	Thomas 4'; Boyle 14'; Sercombe (yellow card) 35'; May 42'; Smith (yellow card) 52'; Wright 57'	Report	O'Connor (yellow card) 45+3'	Stadium: Whaddon Road Ground; Attendance: 0 Referee: John Busby

5 April 2021 39	Tranmere Rovers	1–1	Cambridge United	Birkenhead
15:00 BST	Lewis 11' (yellow card) 80'; Clarke (yellow card) 60'	Report	Mullin 60'	Stadium: Prenton Park; Attendance: 0 Referee: Martin Coy

10 April 2021 40	Scunthorpe United	0–0	Tranmere Rovers	Scunthorpe
15:00 BST	Hippolyte (yellow card) 45'; Gilliead (yellow card) 65'	Report	Macdonald (yellow card) 42'	Stadium: Sands Venue Stadium; Attendance: 0 Referee: Andy Davies

13 April 2021 41	Walsall	1–0	Tranmere Rovers	Bescot
19:00 BST	Osadebe 70'	Report	Spearing (yellow card) 49' (yellow-red card) 74'; Lewis (yellow card) 78'; Vaughan (yellow card) 90+4'	Stadium: Banks's Stadium; Attendance: 0 Referee: Ollie Yates

17 April 2021 42	Tranmere Rovers	0–0	Salford City	Birkenhead
12:30 BST	Woolery (yellow card) 34'; Khan (yellow card) 36'	Report	Turnbull (yellow card) 60'; Dieseruvwe (yellow card) 90'	Stadium: Prenton Park; Attendance: 0 Referee: Bobby Madley

20 April 2021 43	Bradford City	0–1	Tranmere Rovers	Bradford
19:00 BST	Crankshaw (yellow card) 44'	Report	Woolery (yellow card) 19'; O'Connor 45+1' (o.g.); Lloyd (yellow card) 45+3'; Lewis (yellow card) 45+6'	Stadium: Valley Parade; Attendance: 0 Referee: Seb Stockbridge

24 April 2021 44	Tranmere Rovers	1–0	Barrow	Birkenhead
15:00 GMT	Nugent 67'; Clarke (yellow card) 82'	Report	Banks (yellow card) 82'; Ntlhe (yellow card) 82'; Thomas (yellow card) 90+3'	Stadium: Prenton Park; Attendance: 0 Referee: Marc Edwards

1 May 2021 45	Forest Green Rovers	2–1	Tranmere Rovers	Nailsworth
15:00 BST	Adams (yellow card) 22' (yellow-red card) 57'; Collins (yellow card) 45+2', (goal) 81' (pen.); Davison 50'	Report	Morris 90+6'	Stadium: The Innocent [Insert Name Here] Stadium; Attendance: 0 Referee: Tom Nield

8 May 2021 46	Tranmere Rovers	0–0	Colchester United	Birkenhead
15:00 GMT	Khan (yellow card) 55'	Report	Lapslie (yellow card) 11'	Stadium: Prenton Park; Attendance: 0 Referee: James Bell

==== Play-offs ====
20 May 2021 Semi-Final First Leg	Tranmere Rovers	1–2	Morecambe	Birkenhead
18:00 BST	Clarke 19'; Spearing (yellow card) 54'; Vaughan (yellow card) 78'; Lloyd (yellow card) 83'; O'Connor (yellow card) 89'	Report	Knight-Percival 15'; McAlinden 45+1'; Lyons (yellow card) 87'; Mendes Gomes (yellow card) 89'	Stadium: Prenton Park; Attendance: 3,400; Referee: Darren Drysdale

23 May 2021 Semi-Final Second Leg	Morecambe	1–1 (3–2 agg.)	Tranmere Rovers	Morecambe
12:30 BST	Wildig 9'; Cooney (yellow card) 76'	Report	Vaughan 53', (yellow card) 81'	Stadium: The Mazuma Stadium; Attendance: 1,558; Referee: Thomas Bramall

=== FA Cup ===
The draw for the first round was made on Monday 26, October. The second round draw was revealed on Monday, 9 November by Danny Cowley. The third round draw was made on 30 November, with Premier League and EFL Championship clubs all entering the competition.

Win Draw Loss Postponed

7 November 2020 First round	Tranmere Rovers	2–1	Accrington Stanley	Birkenhead
15:00 GMT	Blackett-Taylor 13'; Clarke 84'	Report	Bishop 24'; Butcher (yellow card) 64'; Burgess (yellow card) 88'	Stadium: Prenton Park; Attendance: 0 Referee: Graham Salisbury

27 November 2020 Second round	Tranmere Rovers	1–0	Brackley Town	Birkenhead
19:55 GMT	Woolery 67'	Report		Stadium: Prenton Park; Attendance: 0 Referee: Tom Nield

10 January 2021 Third round	Barnsley	2–0	Tranmere Rovers	Barnsley
13:30 GMT	Helik 59'; Woodrow 90+5' (pen.)	Report		Stadium: Oakwell Stadium; Attendance: 0

=== EFL Cup ===
Win Draw Loss Postponed

The first round draw was made on 18 August, live on Sky Sports, by Paul Merson.

5 September 2020 First round	Tranmere Rovers	1–1 (7–8 p)	Harrogate Town	Birkenhead
15:00 BST	Spearing (yellow card) 34'; Vaughan 64'	Report	Kerry 69'	Stadium: Prenton Park; Attendance: 0 Referee: Tom Nield
	Penalties
	Vaughan (penalty missed); Khan (penalty scored); Banks (penalty scored); Macdonald (penalty scored); Spearing (penalty missed); Morris (penalty scored); Payne (penalty scored); Clarke (penalty scored); O'Connor (penalty scored); Monthé (penalty missed)		Thomson (penalty missed); Stead (penalty scored); Muldoon (penalty scored); Beck (penalty missed); Burrell (penalty scored); Smith (penalty scored); Hall (penalty scored); Fallowfield (penalty scored); Kerry (penalty scored); Falkingham (penalty scored)

=== EFL Trophy ===
Win Draw Loss Postponed

The regional group stage draw was confirmed on 18 August. The second round draw was made by Matt Murray on 20 November, at St Andrew's. The third round was made on 10 December 2020 by Jon Parkin. The draw for the semi-final was announced on 5 February.

Pos	Div	Team	Pld	W	PW	PL	L	GF	GA	GD	Pts	Qualification
1	L2	Port Vale	3	2	1	0	0	7	3	+4	8	Advance to Round 2
2	L2	Tranmere Rovers	3	1	1	1	0	5	4	+1	6	Advance to Round 2
3	L1	Wigan Athletic	3	1	0	1	1	9	6	+3	4	
4	ACA	Liverpool U21	3	0	0	0	3	5	13	−8	0	

Source: EFL.com

8 September 2020 Group stage	Port Vale	0–0 (4–3 p)	Tranmere Rovers	Burslem
19:00 BST	Fitzpatrick (yellow card) 42'; Conlon (yellow card) 90+1'	Report	Banks (yellow card) 23'; Macdonald (yellow card) 74'	Stadium: Vale Park; Attendance: 0 Referee: Declan Bourne
	Penalties
	Whitehead (penalty scored); Cullen (penalty scored); Conlon (penalty missed); Trickett-Smith (penalty missed); Rodney (penalty scored); Fitzpatrick (penalty scored)		Banks (penalty scored); Khan (penalty missed); Morris (penalty scored); O'Connor (penalty scored); Payne (penalty missed); Walker-Rice (penalty missed)

29 September 2020 Group stage	Tranmere Rovers	3–2	Liverpool U21	Birkenhead
19:00 BST	Lewis (yellow card) 38'; Macdonald (yellow card) 65'; Vaughan 74', 75'; Payne 90+1'	Report	Cain 50'; Longstaff 83'	Stadium: Prenton Park; Attendance: 0 Referee: Scott Oldham

11 November 2020 Group stage	Tranmere Rovers	2–2 (3–1 p)	Wigan Athletic	Birkenhead
18:30 GMT	Woolery 45+1'; Morris 72'	Report	Keane 19'; McHugh 45+3' (yellow card) 90+1'	Stadium: Prenton Park; Attendance: 0 Referee: Ben Speedie
	Penalties
	Ferrier (penalty missed); Lloyd (penalty scored); Smith (penalty missed); Banks (penalty scored); Morris (penalty scored)		James (penalty scored); Joseph (penalty missed); Perry (penalty missed); Crankshaw (penalty missed)

8 December 2020 Second round	Tranmere Rovers	2–1	Manchester City U21	Birkenhead
19:45 GMT	Lloyd 27'; Banks 88' (pen.); Nelson (yellow card) 90+3'	Report	Delap 17'; Lavia (yellow card) 33'; Mbete-Tabu (red card) 56'	Stadium: Prenton Park; Attendance: 568; Referee: Seb Stockbridge

13 January 2021 Third round	Tranmere Rovers	4–2	Leicester City U21	Birkenhead
19:00 GMT	Ferrier 4'; Lloyd 37', 45+1'; Blackett-Taylor 53'; Khan (yellow card) 87'	Report	Wakeling 36'; Daley-Campbell (yellow card) 41'; Suengchitthawon 56'	Stadium: Prenton Park; Attendance: 0 Referee: Marc Edwards

2 February 2021 Quarter-final	Tranmere Rovers	2–1	Peterborough United	Birkenhead
19:00 GMT	Lloyd 38'; Lewis 82'	Report	Clarke-Harris 90+1' (pen.)	Stadium: Prenton Park; Attendance: 0 Referee: Sam Barrott

16 February 2021 Semi-final	Oxford United	0–2	Tranmere Rovers	Oxford
18:00 GMT	Grayson (yellow card) 37'; Taylor (penalty missed) 50', (yellow card) 75'	Report	Macdonald (yellow card) 17'; Woolery 35'; Morris 66'; Feeney (yellow card) 90+1'	Stadium: The Kassam Stadium; Attendance: 0 Referee: Craig Hicks

14 March 2021 Final	Sunderland	1–0	Tranmere Rovers	London
15:00 GMT	Gooch 57'	Report		Stadium: Wembley Stadium; Attendance: 0 Referee: Charles Breakspear

== Squad statistics ==
Numbers in parentheses denote appearances as substitute.
Players with squad numbers struck through and marked † left the club during the playing season.
Players with names in italics and marked * were on loan from another club for the whole of their season with Newport County.
Players listed with no appearances have been in the matchday squad but only as unused substitutes.
Key to positions: GK – Goalkeeper; DF – Defender; MF – Midfielder; FW – Forward
