= Kieron Morris =

English footballer (born 1994)

Personal information
- Full name: Kieron Morris
- Date of birth: 3 June 1994 (age 32)
- Place of birth: Hereford, England
- Height: 5 ft 10 in (1.78 m)
- Position: Midfielder

Team information
- Current team: Brackley Town

Youth career
- Leominster Minors
- Hereford
- → Manchester United (loan)
- Walsall

Senior career*
Years	Team	Apps	(Gls)
2013–2019	Walsall	143	(15)
2013	→ Worcester City (loan)	8	(1)
2013–2014	→ Leamington (loan)	4	(0)
2015	→ Wrexham (loan)	9	(2)
2018-2019	→ Tranmere Rovers (loan)	14	(1)
2019–2025	Tranmere Rovers	203	(25)
2025–2026	Oldham Athletic	7	(1)
2026	→ FC Halifax Town (loan)	12	(1)
2026–	Brackley Town	0	(0)
- * Club domestic league appearances and goals as of 13:22, 22 August 2026 (UTC)

Kieron Morris (born 3 June 1994) is an English footballer who played as a midfielder for National League North club Brackley Town.

== Career ==
Morris was born in Hereford and grew up in Leominster, Herefordshire. Part of the Hereford United Centre of Excellence, he played youth football for local club Leominster Minors before being spotted by Manchester United's scouting network. Morris trialled with Manchester United frequently over a few years, but a contract offer never materialised. He eventually began his career with Walsall and made his professional debut on 28 August 2013 in a 3–1 defeat against Stoke City in the Football League Cup.

During the 2012–13 season Morris spent time on loan at Conference North club Worcester City, making eight appearances and scoring one goal, and the following season he had a loan spell at Leamington, where he played four league games. In January 2014 Morris, along with fellow Walsall youth prospects Matt Preston and Danny Griffiths joined up with Icelandic side ÍBV—managed by former Walsall player Sigurður Ragnar Eyjólfsson—on trial. All three played in a 2–1 loss against Stjarnan in a pre-season tournament, but were not taken on by ÍBV and subsequently returned to Walsall.

Morris joined Wrexham on loan until the end of the season on 30 January 2015. During his loan spell with the Red Dragons, he was impressive as he scored a brace in Wrexham's FA Trophy Semi Final 2nd leg victory over Torquay United on 28 February 2015 as well as the winning goal in the Cross-border derby against Chester on 7 March 2015.

He was released by Walsall at the end of the 2018–19 season., before signing for Tranmere Rovers on 26 June 2019.

In May 2020, Morris was named ' Tranmere Player of the Season' for the 2019–20 season.

Morris signed a new two-year contract with the option for a third year at the end of the 2021–22 season.

On 27 June 2025, after his contract ended with Tranmere Rovers, Morris signed with newly promoted EFL League Two club Oldham Athletic.

On 27 January 2026, Morris joined National League club FC Halifax Town on loan for the remainder of the season.

On 22 August 2026, he joined National League North club Brackley Town.

== Career statistics ==
As of end of 2025–26 season

Appearances and goals by club, season and competition
Club	Season	League			FA Cup		League Cup		Other		Total	
Club	Season	Division	Apps	Goals	Apps	Goals	Apps	Goals	Apps	Goals	Apps	Goals
Walsall	2012–13	League One	0	0	0	0	0	0	0	0	0	0
Walsall	2013–14	League One	2	0	0	0	1	0	0	0	3	0
Walsall	2014–15	League One	14	2	0	0	1	1	0	0	15	3
Walsall	2015–16	League One	33	3	4	0	3	0	2 (Note: One appearance in Football League Trophy and one in League One play-offs)	0	42	3
Walsall	2016–17	League One	35	5	0	0	1	0	1 (Note: Appearance(s) in EFL Trophy)	1	37	6
Walsall	2017–18	League One	42	3	1	0	1	0	4	0	48	3
Walsall	2018–19	League One	17	2	3	0	2	1	4	2	26	5
Walsall	Total		143	15	7	0	9	2	11	3	170	20
Worcester City (loan)	2012–13	Conference North	8	1	0	0	—		0	0	8	1
Leamington (loan)	2013–14	Conference North	4	0	0	0	—		1 (Note: Appearance(s) in FA Trophy)	0	5	0
Wrexham (loan)	2014–15	Conference Premier	9	2	0	0	—		4	2	13	4
Tranmere Rovers (loan)	2018–19	League Two	14	1	0	0	0	0	3 (Note: Appearance(s) in the League Two play-offs)	0	17	1
Tranmere Rovers	2019–20	League One	34	2	6	3	1	0	2	0	43	5
Tranmere Rovers	2020–21	League Two	42	5	3	0	1	0	9 (Note: 7 appearances and two goals in EFL Trophy and two appearances in League Two play-offs)	2	55	7
Tranmere Rovers	2021–22	League Two	37	5	1	0	1	0	1	0	40	5
Tranmere Rovers	2022–23	League Two	23	3	1	0	0	0	3	1	27	4
Tranmere Rovers	2023–24	League Two	39	9	1	1	2	0	2	0	44	10
Tranmere Rovers	2024–25	League Two	28	1	1	0	0	0	2	0	31	1
Tranmere Rovers	Total		203	25	13	4	5	0	19	3	240	32
Oldham Athletic	2025–26	League Two	7	0	0	0	1	0	2	1	10	1
FC Halifax Town (loan)	2025–26	National League	12	1	0	0	—		1	1	13	2
Career total			400	45	20	4	15	2	39	10	476	61

== Honours ==
Wrexham

- FA Trophy runner-up: 2014–15

Tranmere Rovers

- EFL League Two play-offs: 2019
- EFL Trophy runner-up: 2020–21

Individual

- Tranmere Rovers Player of the Year: 2019–20
