= Jay Spearing =

English footballer (born 1988)

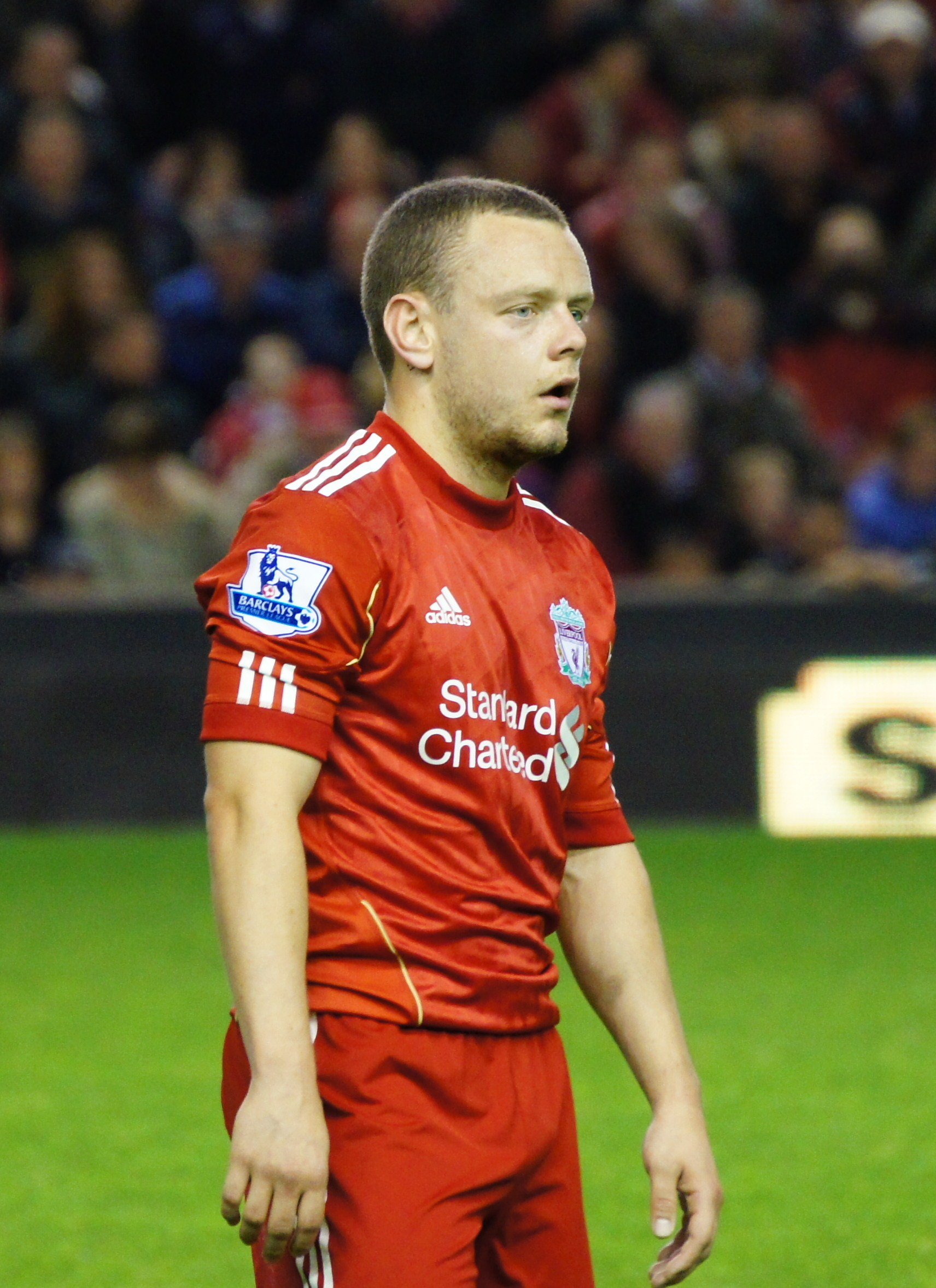
- Spearing playing for Liverpool in 2012

Personal information
- Full name: Jay Francis Spearing
- Date of birth: 25 November 1988 (age 37)
- Place of birth: Wallasey, Merseyside, England
- Height: 5 ft 7 in (1.71 m)
- Position: Defensive midfielder

Team information
- Current team: Liverpool
- Number: 71

Youth career
- 1997–2008: Liverpool

Senior career*
Years	Team	Apps	(Gls)
2008–2013	Liverpool	30	(0)
2010	→ Leicester City (loan)	7	(1)
2012–2013	→ Bolton Wanderers (loan)	37	(2)
2013–2017	Bolton Wanderers	125	(8)
2015	→ Blackburn Rovers (loan)	15	(1)
2017–2020	Blackpool	105	(6)
2020–2022	Tranmere Rovers	75	(4)
2022–	Liverpool	0	(0)
- * Club domestic league appearances and goals as of 14:25, 26 August 2025 (UTC)

Jay Francis Spearing (born 25 November 1988) is an English professional football player and coach who plays as a defensive midfielder for Premier League club Liverpool, where he also serves as Under-21s player-coach.

He started his career with Liverpool as a youth-team player in 1997. He remained at Anfield for sixteen years before leaving, in 2013, for Bolton Wanderers. After four years at Bolton, he joined Blackpool, newly promoted to League One, in 2017, initially until the end of the 2017–18 season. He made the move permanent the following summer and remained at the club until 2020, before joining Tranmere Rovers for two years before his move into coaching.

== Playing career ==
=== Liverpool ===
==== Reserves (2007–2010) ====
Raised in Wallasey, Merseyside, Spearing was the captain of the Liverpool Under 18s that won the FA Youth Cup in 2007. He featured the previous season in the final against Manchester City, but missed the majority of the season due to a broken leg. He was promoted to Melwood in the summer of 2007 to train with the Liverpool first team after impressing in the club's Academy. He had been involved with his boyhood club since he was seven years old. He was voted the best player in the Torneo di Renate, a competition for under-20 sides, competing against clubs such as Milan and Parma. He was also part of the Reserve side that won the Premier Reserve League in the 2007–08 season.

==== 2008–09 season ====
Spearing made his competitive first-team debut on 9 December 2008, coming on as a substitute in a 3–1 UEFA Champions League win against PSV. Spearing also appeared in the Reds' 4–0 win over Real Madrid in the second round of the Champions League.

On 31 March 2009, Liverpool manager Rafael Benítez announced that he would be offering Spearing a new contract, alongside fellow home-grown youngster Stephen Darby. On 6 July 2009, Spearing agreed to a new three-year contract with Liverpool.

==== Loan move to Leicester City ====
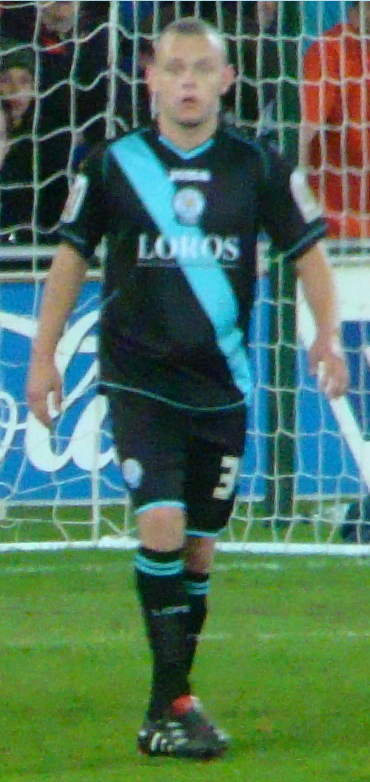
Spearing playing for Leicester City against Cardiff City on 30 March 2010

On 22 March 2010, Liverpool confirmed Spearing would join Championship club Leicester City on loan until the end of the 2009–10 season, linking up with former Liverpool reserve teammate Jack Hobbs. His debut came two days later, starting in the Foxes' 2–1 Championship loss to Reading. His last game for Leicester was on 12 May in the Championship play-off semi-final, with Leicester winning 3–2, but it wasn't enough to reach the final as they lost on a penalty shootout. He made nine appearances for Leicester and scored his only goal for the club in the 4–1 home win against Watford.

==== 2010–11 season ====
Spearing was included in Liverpool's 21-man squad for the 2010–11 Premier League season. He started and played the full 90 minutes in the opening leg of Liverpool's UEFA Europa League qualifier against Macedonian side FK Rabotnički, and came on as a substitute at Anfield in the second leg. On 16 September, he again played the full 90 minutes in the Reds' opening group game against Steaua București, his first-ever start at Anfield, setting up David Ngog for the fourth and final goal as Liverpool won 4–1. On 22 September, he was involved in Liverpool's League Cup third-round exit to League Two side Northampton Town; Liverpool lost 4–2 on penalties after a 2–2 draw. On 21 October, he played the full 90 minutes in Liverpool's third group-stage tie, a 0–0 draw with a Napoli side featuring former Liverpool left-back Andrea Dossena.

Spearing was an unused substitute in Liverpool's 1–0 Premier League win against Bolton Wanderers at the Reebok Stadium on 31 October. He came on in the 90th minute of Liverpool's 2–0 victory over Chelsea on 7 November 2010, instantly making an impact by playing a through ball to assist a Maxi Rodríguez effort.

On 20 November, it was reported that Spearing had broken his ankle in training and would be out for up to six weeks. He made his first appearance of 2011 against Everton on 16 January. In the post-match interview, Liverpool manager Kenny Dalglish praised the young midfielder and joked that Steven Gerrard may never get into the first team again. On 20 March, Spearing started another league game, away to Sunderland. Spearing won a penalty, which was converted by Dirk Kuyt to put Liverpool 1–0 up.

Spearing then went on the secure a first-team berth with the absence of Steven Gerrard and out-of-favour Christian Poulsen. For the remainder of the Premier League season, he formed a midfield partnership with Lucas. Against Arsenal on 17 April, Spearing gave away a 98th-minute penalty, which Robin van Persie converted to make the game 1–0. The match finished 1–1. Despite this, Spearing won the man-of-the-match award from Sky Sports and was praised after the game for his determination, work-rate and battling performance. He received the journalists' man-of-the-match award on the official Liverpool website three times during the season.

In May 2011, the club announced that he had extended his contract, and he was included in England under-21s provisional 40-man squad for the 2011 Summer U21 European Championship, with fellow Liverpool player Andy Carroll.

==== 2011–12 season ====
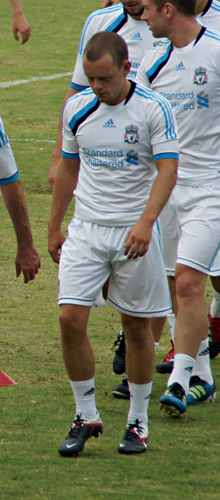
Spearing during pre-season training

For the 2011–12 season, Spearing wore the number 20, with his old number 26 being registered to new arrival Charlie Adam. Spearing immediately fell down the pecking order in Liverpool's midfield after the arrival of midfielders Adam, Jordan Henderson and Stewart Downing. On 20 July 2011, it was widely reported that Spearing would consider an option to move to Wolverhampton Wanderers on loan, but the club rejected their approach, stating that Spearing was in their plans. Spearing later dismissed the rumour saying he was willing to fight for his place in the starting eleven.

He made his first start of the season against Exeter City in the League Cup on 24 August 2011. The result ended in a 3–1 victory for Liverpool. He was sent off for the first time in his professional career during Liverpool's 1–0 loss to Fulham on 5 December. In May 2012, Spearing was in the starting eleven for the FA Cup final, in which Liverpool lost to Chelsea.

==== 2012–13 season ====
New Liverpool manager Brendan Rodgers described Spearing as a "very good player with great qualities" who has "the soul of the club in his heart". He started the first competitive game of the season in the UEFA Europa League qualifier against Belarusian club Gomel, playing the full 90 minutes, and made a substitute appearance in the return leg at Anfield. His final appearance of the season for Liverpool came as a start in the 1–0 victory against Hearts in a Europa League qualifier on 23 August 2012.

==== Loan move to Bolton Wanderers ====
On 31 August 2012, Spearing joined Championship side Bolton Wanderers on a season-long loan deal. His debut came a day later in Bolton's 3–1 defeat against Hull City. He scored his first goal for Bolton on 20 October as the club beat Bristol City 3–2, in which he scored Bolton's second goal, an equaliser. On 25 April 2013, Spearing was named the Bolton Wanderers Supporters Association (BWSA) Player of the Season. This was followed on 20 May with his being named the club's Player of the Season.

==== Return to Liverpool ====
At the conclusion of Bolton's season in the Championship, Spearing returned to Anfield. Although he did not feature in any of the club's remaining fixtures, he was present in the guard of honour for the retiring Jamie Carragher in the last game of the 2012–13 Premier League against Queens Park Rangers.

In July 2013, a £1.75 million bid was submitted by Championship side Blackburn Rovers for Spearing, which Liverpool rejected. Notwithstanding, Blackburn failed to agree terms with Spearing, and the deal fell through.

Spearing featured in Liverpool's first pre-season friendly of the summer against Preston North End and was also included in the squad for the club's summer tour. In August 2013, Spearing was told by Liverpool that he was free to leave the club, with Liverpool entering talks with Bolton for a possible transfer back to the Reebok Stadium.

=== Bolton Wanderers ===
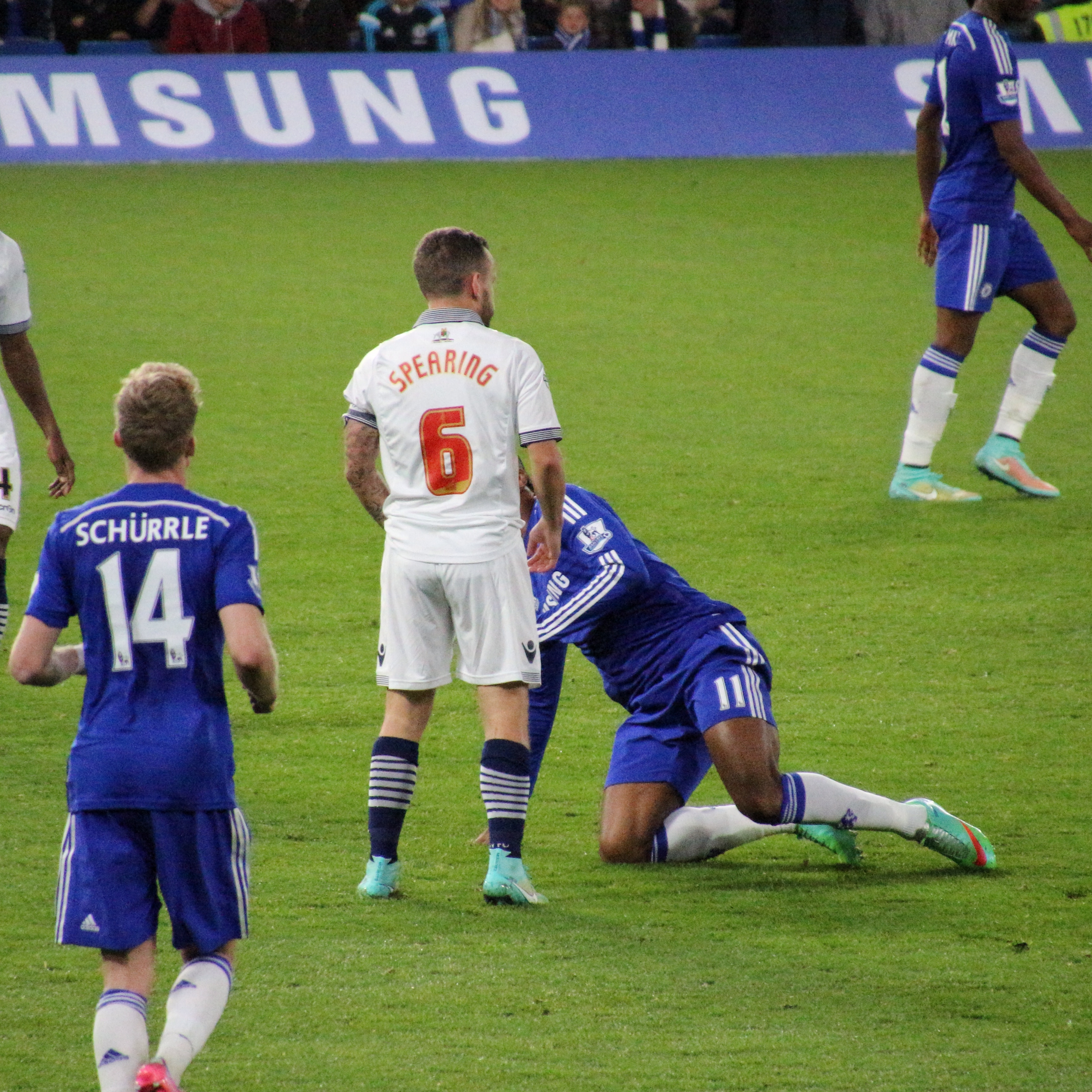
Spearing playing for Bolton Wanderers against Chelsea in the League Cup, 2014

On 8 August 2013, it was announced that a deal was struck between Liverpool and Bolton subject to a medical on the same afternoon. It was confirmed on 9 August that Spearing had agreed a four-year deal for an undisclosed fee and he made his debut the following day in the 1–1 home draw against Reading. The Manchester Evening News described this debut as "a man-of-the-match performance".

In September 2013, Spearing was handed the captaincy at Bolton Wanderers whenever incumbent Zat Knight found himself out of the starting XI, although he retained the armband when Knight returned to the team with both in the starting lineup. On 26 July 2014, the club confirmed that Spearing would succeed Knight as captain.

On 8 August 2015, Spearing was sent off with a second booking in the opening match of the 2015–16 Championship season against Derby County. Spearing's goal on the opening day of the 2016–17 season against Sheffield United won August's Goal of the Month award.

On 8 July 2017 the club confirmed that Spearing had left after failing to agree terms on a new contract.

A clause in his contract whilst at Bolton stipulated that if he played more than 22 Championship matches each season, they would have to pay Liverpool £100,000. This is why he played only 21 in 2014–15 and 22 in 2015–16 as Bolton couldn't afford to pay the clauses and lead to him being loaned out the first time, and dropped from the squad the second time. This seemingly didn't apply to League One.

==== Blackburn Rovers (loan) ====
On 30 January 2015, Spearing was loaned to fellow Championship club Blackburn Rovers until the end of the season.

=== Blackpool ===
On 4 October 2017, Spearing joined Blackpool until the end of the season. He scored his first goals for Blackpool when he scored twice in a 3–2 win over Bradford City on 8 September 2018. He made the move permanent in the summer.

Spearing left Blackpool at the end of the 2019–20 season, after three years, having failed to agree terms on a new contract.

=== Tranmere Rovers ===
On 5 August 2020, Spearing signed a two-year deal with his hometown club Tranmere Rovers. He was named Player of the Season for the 2020–21 season. Spearing was released at the end of the 2021–22 season.

=== Return to Liverpool ===
On 17 June 2022, in addition to his Under-18s coaching role, Spearing was registered as a player for the Under-23s team as an over-aged player.

He made his second professional debut for Liverpool on 20 September 2022, appearing for Liverpool's Under-21s side against Rochdale in the EFL Trophy. Spearing played again for Liverpool in 2025 starting against Burton Albion, again in the EFL Trophy.

== Coaching career ==
On 17 June 2022, Spearing returned to Liverpool to become a coach for the Under-18s team, and would continue his career as a player as he was also registered as an over-age player for the Liverpool U21.

== Personal life ==
In December 2022, Spearing revealed he had been diagnosed with Addison's disease, having been rushed to hospital on Christmas Eve.

== Career statistics ==
As of match played 14 October 2025

Appearances and goals by club, season and competition
Club	Season	League			FA Cup		League Cup		Europe		Other		Total	
Club	Season	Division	Apps	Goals	Apps	Goals	Apps	Goals	Apps	Goals	Apps	Goals	Apps	Goals
Liverpool	2008–09	Premier League	0	0	0	0	0	0	2 (Note: Appearances in UEFA Champions League)	0	—		2	0
Liverpool	2009–10	Premier League	3	0	0	0	2	0	0	0	—		5	0
Liverpool	2010–11	Premier League	11	0	0	0	1	0	8 (Note: Appearances in UEFA Europa League)	0	—		20	0
Liverpool	2011–12	Premier League	16	0	4	0	5	0	0	0	—		25	0
Liverpool	2012–13	Premier League	0	0	0	0	0	0	3	0	—		3	0
Liverpool	Total		30	0	4	0	8	0	13	0	—		55	0
Leicester City (loan)	2009–10	Championship	7	1	0	0	0	0	—		2 (Note: Appearances in Championship play-offs)	0	9	1
Bolton Wanderers (loan)	2012–13	Championship	37	2	2	0	0	0	—		—		39	2
Bolton Wanderers	2013–14	Championship	45	2	1	0	0	0	—		—		46	2
Bolton Wanderers	2014–15	Championship	21	1	1	0	1	0	—		—		23	1
Bolton Wanderers	2015–16	Championship	22	2	1	0	0	0	—		—		23	2
Bolton Wanderers	2016–17	League One	37	3	3	0	0	0	—		2 (Note: Appearance(s) in EFL Trophy)	0	42	3
Bolton Wanderers	Total		162	10	8	0	1	0	—		2	0	173	10
Blackburn Rovers (loan)	2014–15	Championship	15	1	0	0	0	0	—		—		15	1
Blackpool	2017–18	League One	33	0	1	0	0	0	—		1	0	35	0
Blackpool	2018–19	League One	42	4	3	1	4	1	—		0	0	49	6
Blackpool	2019–20	League One	30	2	4	0	1	0	—		1	0	36	2
Blackpool	Total		105	6	8	1	5	1	—		2	0	120	8
Tranmere Rovers	2020–21	League Two	43	1	3	0	1	0	—		7 (Note: Five appearances in EFL Trophy and two appearances in EFL League Two play-offs)	0	54	1
Tranmere Rovers	2021–22	League Two	32	3	2	0	1	0	—		0	0	35	3
Tranmere Rovers	Total		75	4	5	0	2	0	0	0	8	0	89	4
Liverpool U-21s	2022–23	—	—		—		—		—		1	0	1	0
Liverpool U-21s	2023–24	—	—		—		—		—		3	0	3	0
Liverpool U-21s	2024–25	—	—		—		—		—		2	0	2	0
Liverpool U-21s	2025–26	—	—		—		—		—		2	0	2	0
Liverpool U-21s	Total		0	0	0	0	0	0	0	0	8	0	8	0
Career total			394	22	25	1	16	1	13	0	21	0	469	24

== Honours ==
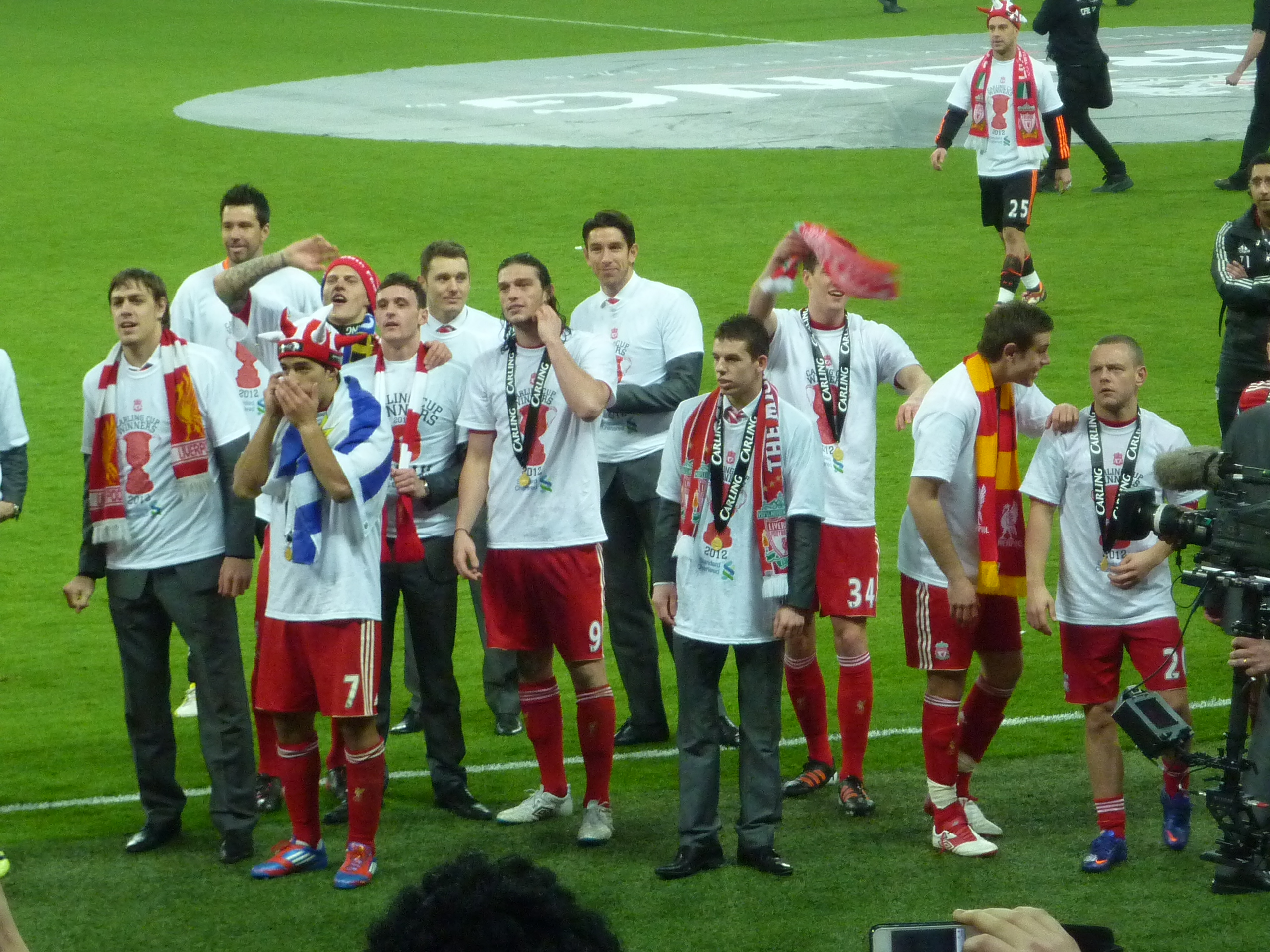
Spearing (furthest right) with his Liverpool clubmates after winning the 2012 Football League Cup final

Liverpool

- Football League Cup: 2011–12
- FA Cup runner-up: 2011–12

Bolton Wanderers

- EFL League One runner-up: 2016–17

Tranmere Rovers

- EFL Trophy runner-up: 2020–21

Individual

- Bolton Wanderers Player of the Year: 2012–13
- EFL League One Goal of the Month: August 2016
- Tranmere Rovers Player of the Year: 2020–21
