= Kaiyne Woolery =

English footballer (born 1995)

Personal information
- Full name: Kaiyne River Woolery
- Date of birth: 11 January 1995 (age 31)
- Place of birth: Hackney, London, England
- Position: Winger

Youth career
- –2011: Redhill

Senior career*
Years	Team	Apps	(Gls)
2011–2012	Redhill	15	(6)
2012–2013	Maidstone United		
2013–2014	Tamworth	18	(2)
2014	→ Maidstone United (loan)	9	(2)
2013	→ Stafford Rangers (loan)	9	(5)
2014–2016	Bolton Wanderers	19	(2)
2015	→ Notts County (loan)	5	(0)
2016–2017	Wigan Athletic	1	(0)
2017	→ Forest Green Rovers (loan)	16	(2)
2017–2020	Swindon Town	100	(12)
2020–2021	Tranmere Rovers	40	(8)
2021–2022	Motherwell	31	(2)
2022–2023	Sakaryaspor	15	(1)
2023	Ionikos	9	(0)
2023–2024	Panserraikos	17	(0)
2024–2025	Anorthosis Famagusta	5	(0)
2026	Gnistan	0	(0)
2026	Tranmere Rovers	8	(0)
2026	Sligo Rovers	9	(2)
- * Club domestic league appearances and goals as of 17:10, 13 November 2026 (UTC)

Kaiyne River Woolery (born 11 January 1995) is an English professional footballer who plays as a winger, most recently for League of Ireland First Division club Sligo Rovers.

== Career ==
=== Early years ===
Woolery was signed by Conference Premier team Tamworth from Isthmian League club Maidstone United in June 2013. He was loaned to Stafford Rangers of the Northern Premier League at the start of the 2013–14 season. He was loaned back to Maidstone in January 2014 for a two-month spell.

=== Bolton Wanderers ===
He joined Championship club Bolton Wanderers in August 2014 for a £10,000 fee. He was sent out on loan to League One side Notts County in January 2015.

He made his Bolton debut as a substitute for Adam Le Fondre when Wanderers lost 3–0 to the eventual Champions Bournemouth on 27 April 2015. On 6 February 2016, Woolery scored his first senior goal for Bolton, a 93rd-minute winner against Rotherham United.

=== Wigan Athletic ===
Woolery joined Wigan Athletic on 31 August 2016 and was given the number 18 shirt. He made his debut for the Latics on 3 December 2016, when he came on as a substitute for Max Power in the 86th minute in a 1–0 loss to Derby County.

On 21 January 2017 it was announced that Woolery had signed for National League side Forest Green Rovers on loan until the end of the season. He made his debut for Forest Green on the same day of his signing, coming on as a substitute for Keanu Marsh-Brown in a 1–1 draw with Braintree Town. Woolery went on to score twice for FGR at Wembley in the 2017 National league play-off final.

=== Swindon Town ===
On 7 August 2017, Woolery joined League Two side Swindon Town on a three-year deal for a £350,000 fee. After coming on as a half-time substitute, he scored an equaliser against Exeter City on his Swindon Town debut at the County Ground on 12 August 2017. After a fairly inconsistent first season for Swindon Town, he got injured in April in a home match against Yeovil Town. This injury ruled him out for the rest of the 2017/18 season and the first 2 months of the 2018/19 season. He made his return on 9 October 2018, coming on as a second half sub in an EFL Trophy group stage match against Plymouth Argyle and scoring within ten minutes.

=== Tranmere Rovers ===
On 14 September 2020, Woolery joined League Two side Tranmere Rovers on a free transfer. He scored his first goal for Tranmere in an EFL Trophy tie against Wigan Athletic on 11 November 2020.

=== Motherwell ===
On 22 June 2021, Woolery signed for Scottish Premiership side Motherwell on a three-year contract, with the manager Graham Alexander quoted as saying, "Kaiyne is a player I've admired for a few years now". On 14 July 2022, Motherwell announced that Woolery had left the club to join TFF First League club Sakaryaspor for an undisclosed fee.

=== Ionikos ===
In January 2023, Woolery joined Super League Greece side Ionikos on a free transfer.

=== Anorthosis Famagusta ===
In June 2024, Woolery joined Cypriot First Division side Anorthosis Famagusta.

=== Gnistan ===
On 30 January 2026, Woolery featured for Veikkausliiga club IF Gnistan on trial in a 2–2 draw with IFK Mariehamn in a 2–2 draw in a Finnish League Cup tie.

=== Tranmere Rovers ===
On 20 March 2026, Woolery returned to former club Tranmere Rovers on a short-term contract. On 12 May 2026, the club announced he would be leaving in the summer once his contract expired.

=== Sligo Rovers ===
On 13 August 2026, Woolery joined League of Ireland Premier Division club Sligo Rovers on a short-term deal until the end of the season. Woolery made his debut for Sligo Rovers on 15 August 2026 in the FAI Cup against Kerry, coming on as substitute in the second half and capped his first appearance off with scoring his first goal for the club and his first competitive goal in 1,364 days in the 91st minute. By the end of the season he scored 3 goals in 11 appearances in all competitions as the club finished bottom of the league and were relegated to play in the League of Ireland First Division for the first time since 2006.

== Career statistics ==
As of match played 30 October 2026

Appearances and goals by club, season and competition
Club	Season	League			National Cup (Note: Includes FA Cup, Scottish Cup, Turkish Cup, Greek Football Cup, Cypriot Cup, Finnish Cup & FAI Cup)		League Cup (Note: Includes EFL Cup, Scottish League Cup & Finnish League Cup)		Other		Total	
Club	Season	Division	Apps	Goals	Apps	Goals	Apps	Goals	Apps	Goals	Apps	Goals
Tamworth	2013–14	Conference Premier	18	2	1	0	—		1 (Note: Appearance(s) in FA Trophy)	0	20	2
Maidstone United (loan)	2013–14	Isthmian League Premier Division	9	1	0	0	—		0	0	9	1
Bolton Wanderers	2014–15	Championship	1	0	0	0	0	0	—		1	0
Bolton Wanderers	2015–16	Championship	17	2	3	0	0	0	—		20	2
Bolton Wanderers	2016–17	League One	1	0	0	0	1	1	1 (Note: Appearance(s) in EFL Trophy)	0	3	1
Bolton Wanderers	Total		19	2	3	0	1	1	1	0	24	3
Notts County (loan)	2014–15	League One	5	0	0	0	0	0	0	0	5	0
Wigan Athletic	2016–17	Championship	1	0	0	0	0	0	—		1	0
Forest Green Rovers (loan)	2016–17	National League	16	2	0	0	—		4 (Note: One appearance in FA Trophy, three appearances and two goals in National League play-offs)	2	20	4
Swindon Town	2017–18	League Two	37	4	2	0	0	0	4	1	43	5
Swindon Town	2018–19	League Two	29	6	0	0	0	0	1	1	30	7
Swindon Town	2019–20	League Two	34	2	2	0	1	0	2	0	39	2
Swindon Town	Total		100	12	4	0	1	0	7	2	112	14
Tranmere Rovers	2020–21	League Two	40	8	3	1	0	0	9 (Note: Seven appearances & two goals in EFL Trophy, two appearances in League Two play-offs)	2	52	11
Motherwell	2021–22	Scottish Premiership	31	2	2	0	5	1	—		38	3
Sakaryaspor	2022–23	TFF 1. Lig	15	1	1	0	—		—		16	1
Ionikos	2022–23	Super League Greece	9	0	—		—		—		9	0
Panserraikos	2023–24	Super League Greece	17	0	3	0	—		—		20	0
Anorthosis Famagusta	2024–25	Cypriot First Division	5	0	0	0	—		—		5	0
Gnistan	2026	Veikkausliiga	—		—		1	0	—		1	0
Tranmere Rovers	2025–26	EFL League Two	8	0	—		—		—		8	0
Sligo Rovers	2026	LOI Premier Division	9	2	2	1	—		—		11	3
Career total			302	32	19	2	8	2	22	6	351	42

== Honours ==
Swindon Town

- EFL League Two: 2019–20

Tranmere Rovers

- EFL Trophy runner-up: 2020–21
