= Danny Walker-Rice =

English footballer (born 2000)

Personal information
- Full name: Daniel Joseph Walker-Rice
- Date of birth: 10 November 2000 (age 26)
- Place of birth: London, England
- Height: 1.69 m (5 ft 7 in)
- Position: Forward

Youth career
- 2008–2018: Tranmere Rovers

Senior career*
Years	Team	Apps	(Gls)
2018–2021	Tranmere Rovers	2	(0)
2021–2022	Bala Town	10	(0)
- * Club domestic league appearances and goals as of 11:23, 8 February 2022 (UTC)

Daniel Joseph Walker-Rice (born 10 November 2000) is a professional footballer who plays as a forward.

== Career statistics ==
=== Club ===
As of match played 02 February 2021

Appearances and goals by club, season and competition
Club	Season	League			Cup (Note: includes FA Cup and Welsh Cup)		League Cup (Note: includes EFL Cup and Welsh League Cup)		Other		Total	
Club	Season	Division	Apps	Goals	Apps	Goals	Apps	Goals	Apps	Goals	Apps	Goals
Tranmere Rovers	2017–18	National League	1	0	0	0	0	0	0	0	1	0
Tranmere Rovers	2018–19	League Two	0	0	0	0	0	0	0	0	0	0
Tranmere Rovers	2019–20	League One	0	0	0	0	0	0	3 (Note: Appearance(s) in the EFL Trophy)	0	3	0
Tranmere Rovers	2020–21	League Two	1	0	0	0	0	0	3	0	4	0
Tranmere Rovers	Total		2	0	0	0	0	0	6	0	8	0
Bala Town	2021–22	Cymru Premier	10	0	3	2	0	0	1 (Note: Appearances in UEFA Conference League qualification)	0	14	2
Career total			12	0	3	2	0	0	7	0	22	2
