= Kumberg =

- Municipality
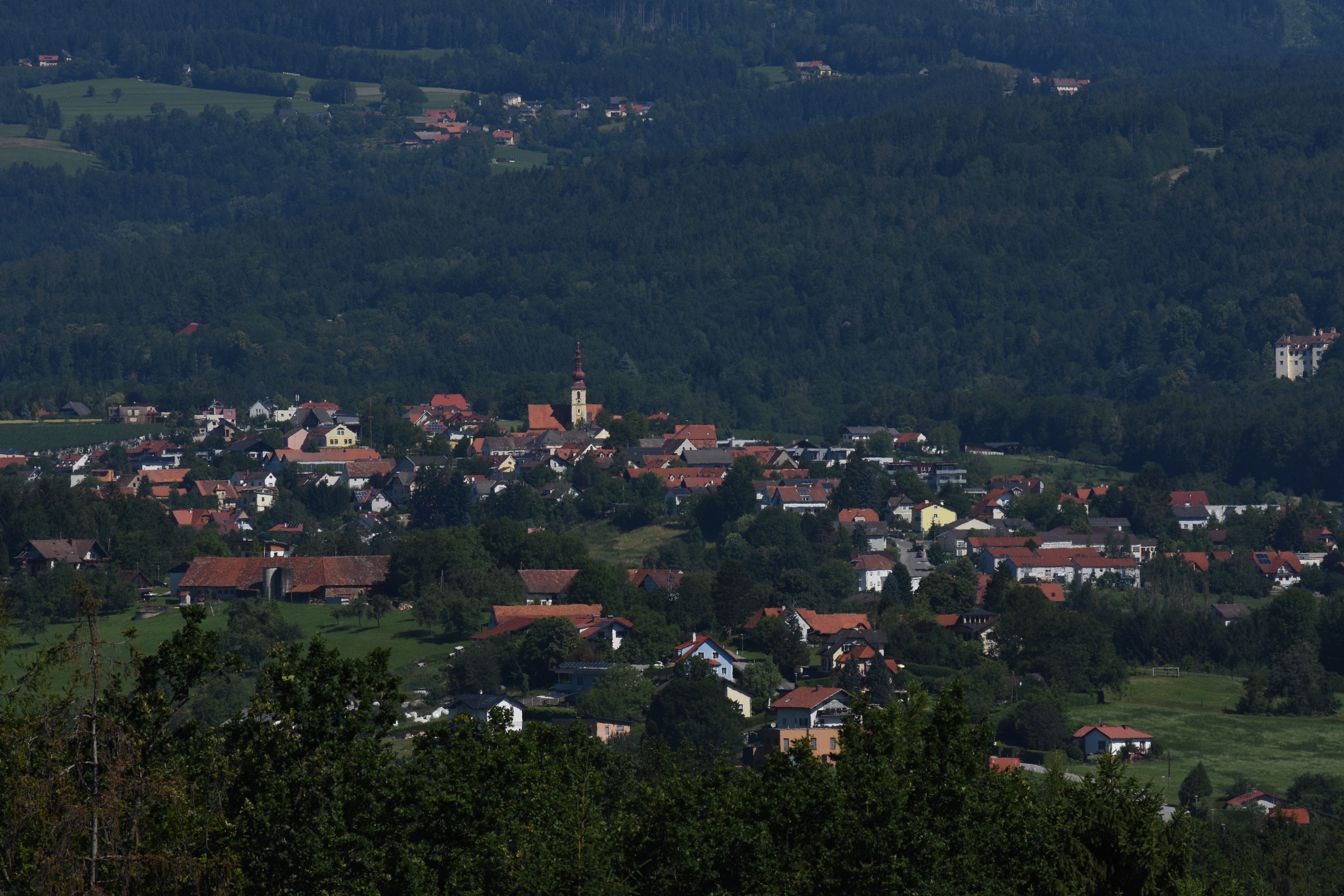
- View of Kumberg

- Coat of arms

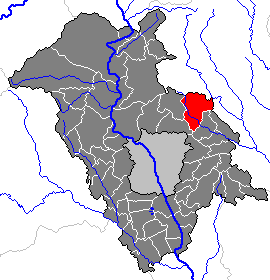
- Location within Graz-Umgebung district

- Location within Austria
- Coordinates: 47°09′34″N 15°32′03″E
- Country: Austria
- State: Styria
- District: Graz-Umgebung

Government
  - Mayor: Franz Gruber (ÖVP)

Area
  - Total: 29.27 km^{2} (11.30 sq mi)
- Elevation: 526 m (1,726 ft)

Population (2018-01-01)
  - Total: 3,843
  - Density: 131.3/km^{2} (340.1/sq mi)
- Time zone: UTC+1 (CET)
  - Summer (DST): UTC+2 (CEST)
- Postal code: 8062
- Area code: 03132
- Vehicle registration: GU
- Website: www.kumberg.at

Kumberg is a municipality in the district of Graz-Umgebung in the Austrian state of Styria. It has 3909 inhabitants (as of January 1, 2021).

== Population ==
Historical population
Year	Pop.	±%
1869	1,770	—
1880	1,829	+3.3%
1890	1,871	+2.3%
1900	1,971	+5.3%
1910	1,939	−1.6%
1923	1,944	+0.3%
1934	2,014	+3.6%
1939	1,956	−2.9%
1951	1,999	+2.2%
1961	2,054	+2.8%
1971	2,273	+10.7%
1981	2,373	+4.4%
1991	2,716	+14.5%
2001	3,067	+12.9%
2011	3,569	+16.4%
