= Liam Feeney =

English footballer (born 1987)

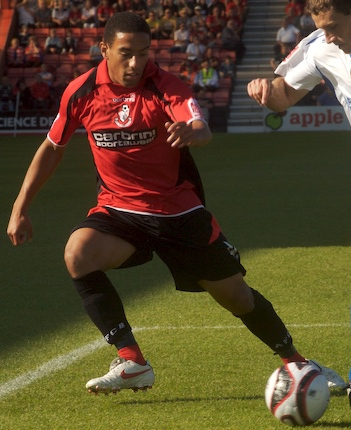
- Feeney in 2009

Personal information
- Full name: Liam Michael Feeney-Howard
- Date of birth: 21 January 1987 (age 39)
- Place of birth: Hammersmith, England
- Height: 1.83 m (6 ft 0 in)
- Position: Midfielder

Senior career*
Years	Team	Apps	(Gls)
2005–2007	Hayes	46	(8)
2007–2009	Salisbury City	65	(11)
2008	→ Southend United (loan)	1	(0)
2009–2011	AFC Bournemouth	109	(12)
2011–2014	Millwall	73	(5)
2013	→ Bolton Wanderers (loan)	4	(0)
2014	→ Blackburn Rovers (loan)	6	(0)
2014–2016	Bolton Wanderers	78	(8)
2016	→ Ipswich Town (loan)	9	(1)
2016–2018	Blackburn Rovers	35	(0)
2017–2018	→ Cardiff City (loan)	15	(0)
2018–2021	Blackpool	69	(1)
2020–2021	→ Tranmere Rovers (loan)	41	(3)
2021–2022	Tranmere Rovers	19	(0)
2022–2023	Scunthorpe United	41	(1)
Total		611	(50)
- * Club domestic league appearances and goals

Liam Michael Feeney-Howard (born 21 January 1987) is an English former footballer who played as a midfielder.

== Career ==
=== Early career ===
Feeney joined League One side Southend United on loan until 3 January 2009 in November 2008. He made his debut after coming on as an 80th-minute substitute in a 3–0 defeat to Leicester City on 6 December. He signed for AFC Bournemouth on 2 February for an undisclosed fee.

Feeney scored his first goal for Bournemouth during a 4–0 win over Rochdale.

=== Millwall ===
Feeney made his Millwall debut on 11 September 2011 against Birmingham City. After three years with the club, he was released on 10 May 2014.

==== Loans ====
On 27 September 2013 Feeney joined Millwall's divisional rivals Bolton Wanderers on a three-month loan deal.

He made his debut, as a substitute for Lee Chung-Yong, the following day in a 1–1 draw against Yeovil Town at the Reebok Stadium.

Millwall exercised their right to activate a 28-day recall clause due to injuries in their squad, meaning an earlier-than-expected return to The Den. He later joined Blackburn Rovers on loan in March.

=== Bolton Wanderers ===
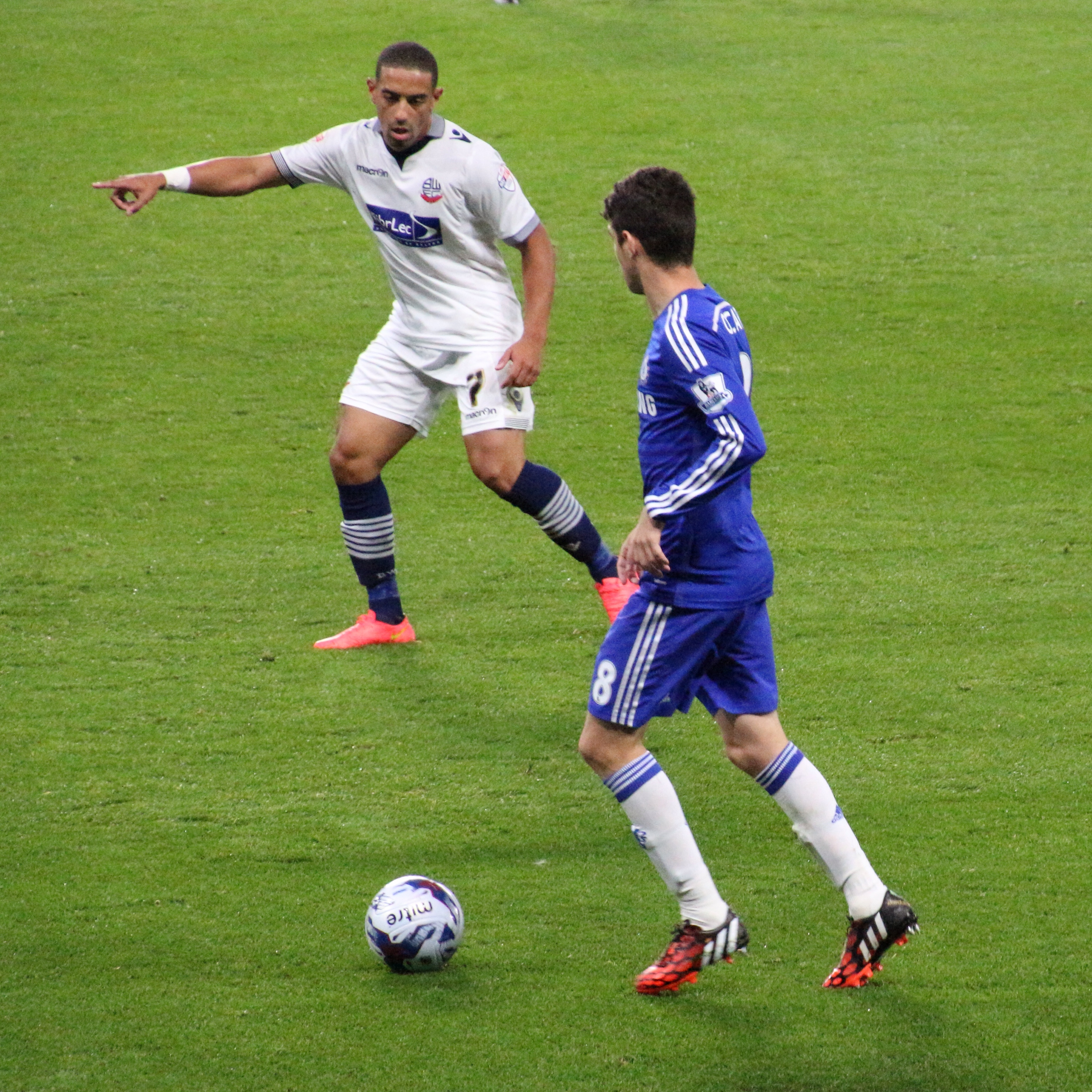
Feeney defending against Chelsea's Oscar during an League Cup tie in November 2014

On 19 May 2014, Bolton Wanderers announced that Feeney would rejoin the club on a permanent deal once his Millwall contract had expired. He made his second debut on the opening day of the new season in a 3–0 loss to Watford and scored his first goals for Bolton on 4 November, scoring twice in a 3–0 home win against Cardiff City. At the end of the 2015–16 season, the club confirmed that he would be leaving when his contract expired at the end of June.

==== Ipswich Town (loan) ====
On 17 March 2016, Feeney signed for Ipswich Town on loan. He made his Blues' debut against Rotherham United, after coming on as a second-half substitute.

=== Blackburn Rovers ===
On 25 June 2016, Feeney re-signed for Blackburn Rovers; whom he was previously on loan to, on a two-year deal, with an option of a third year.

On 31 August 2017, Feeney joined Championship side Cardiff City on loan until 1 January 2018. He made his debut at Fulham on 9 September, coming on to set up Danny Ward for the equaliser in a 1–1 draw.

He was released by Blackburn at the end of the 2017–18 season.

=== Blackpool ===
On 23 August 2018, Feeney signed for Blackpool on an initial two-year contract. He was given a starting debut in their 2–0 victory over Bristol Rovers at Bloomfield Road.

Feeney scored his first goal for Blackpool in his 66th game for the club. It came in a 3–1 victory over Fleetwood Town at Bloomfield Road on 7 December 2019. It was also his first goal since 7 January 2017, for Blackburn.

=== Tranmere Rovers ===
On 17 September 2020, Feeney joined League Two side Tranmere Rovers on a season-long loan deal. Feeney featured in both of Tranmere's play-off matches at the end of the season as they were defeated at the semi-final stage by Morecambe. Following this unsuccessful end to the season, Feeney joined the club on a permanent deal in June 2021 on a one-year deal.

=== Scunthorpe United ===
On 26 January 2022, Feeney had his Tranmere contract terminated by mutual consent in order to join Scunthorpe United on a free transfer.

Following Scunthorpe's second successive relegation, Feeney was released at the end of the 2022–23 season.

=== After football ===
On 2 October 2024, it was revealed that he had retired from the game to become a football agent.

== Career statistics ==
As of end of 2022–23 season

Club	Season	League			FA Cup		League Cup		Other		Total	
Club	Season	Division	Apps	Goals	Apps	Goals	Apps	Goals	Apps	Goals	Apps	Goals
Salisbury City	2007–08	Conference	42	9	0	0	—		1 (Note: Appearances in the FA Trophy)	0	43	9
Salisbury City	2008–09	Conference	23	2	0	0	—		1	0	24	2
Salisbury City	Total		65	11	0	0	—		2	0	67	11
Southend United (loan)	2008–09	League One	1	0	0	0	0	0	0	0	1	0
AFC Bournemouth	2008–09	League Two	14	3	0	0	0	0	0	0	14	3
AFC Bournemouth	2009–10	League Two	44	5	2	0	1	0	1 (Note: Appearance in the Football League Trophy)	0	48	5
AFC Bournemouth	2010–11	League One	46	4	2	1	1	0	3 (Note: One appearance in the Football League Trophy and two in the League One play-offs)	0	52	5
AFC Bournemouth	2011–12	League One	5	0	0	0	2	1	0	0	7	1
AFC Bournemouth	Total		109	12	4	1	4	1	4	0	121	14
Millwall	2011–12	Championship	34	4	5	1	0	0	–	–	39	5
Millwall	2012–13	Championship	22	1	3	1	1	0	–	–	26	2
Millwall	2013–14	Championship	17	0	0	0	1	1	–	–	18	1
Millwall	Total		73	5	8	2	2	1	–	–	83	8
Bolton Wanderers (loan)	2013–14	Championship	4	0	0	0	0	0	–	–	4	0
Blackburn Rovers (loan)	2013–14	Championship	6	0	0	0	0	0	–	–	6	0
Bolton Wanderers	2014–15	Championship	41	3	3	0	3	0	–	–	47	3
Bolton Wanderers	2015–16	Championship	37	5	3	0	1	0	–	–	41	5
Bolton Wanderers	Total		78	8	6	0	4	0	–	–	88	8
Ipswich Town (loan)	2015–16	Championship	9	1	0	0	0	0	–	–	9	1
Blackburn Rovers	2016–17	Championship	34	0	2	1	3	0	1 (Note: Appearance in the Football League Trophy with Blackburn's U23 side)	1	40	2
Blackburn Rovers	2017–18	League One	1	0	0	0	2	0	1	0	4	0
Blackburn Rovers	Total		35	0	2	1	5	0	2	1	44	2
Cardiff City (loan)	2017–18	Championship	15	0	1	0	0	0	0	0	16	0
Blackpool	2018–19	League One	34	0	4	0	2	0	2	0	42	0
Blackpool	2019–20	League One	35	1	4	0	1	0	2	0	42	1
Blackpool	2020–21	League One	0	0	0	0	0	0	0	0	0	0
Blackpool	Total		69	1	8	0	3	0	4	0	84	1
Tranmere Rovers (loan)	2020–21	League Two	41	3	2	0	0	0	4 (Note: Two appearances in EFL Trophy, two appearances in EFL League Two play-offs)	0	47	3
Tranmere Rovers	2021–22	League Two	19	0	1	0	1	0	2	0	23	0
Tranmere Rovers	Total		60	3	3	0	1	0	6	0	70	3
Scunthorpe United	2021–22	League Two	19	0	0	0	0	0	0	0	19	0
Scunthorpe United	2022–23	National League	22	1	0	0	—		0	0	22	1
Scunthorpe United	Total		41	1	0	0	0	0	0	0	41	1
Career total			555	42	32	4	19	2	16	1	634	49

== Honours ==
Cardiff City

- EFL Championship runner-up: 2017–18

Tranmere Rovers

- EFL Trophy runner-up: 2020–21
