= 2022–23 EFL Trophy =

Papa John's Trophy

Tournament details
- Country: England; Wales
- Teams: 64

Final positions
- Champions: Bolton Wanderers (2nd title)
- Runners-up: Plymouth Argyle

Tournament statistics
- Matches played: 127
- Goals scored: 391 (3.08 per match)
- Attendance: 312,727 (2,462 per match)
- Top goal scorer: (Republic of Ireland) Tom Cannon Everton U21 (5 goals)

The 2022–23 EFL Trophy, known as the Papa John's Trophy for sponsorship reasons, the 42nd season in the history of the competition, was a knock-out tournament for clubs in EFL League One and League Two, the third and fourth tiers of the English football league system, as well as the "Academy teams" of 16 Premier League clubs with Category One status.

The defending champions were Rotherham United but they were unable to defend their trophy due to their promotion to the EFL Championship.

Bolton Wanderers won the trophy for the second time, defeating Plymouth Argyle 4–0 in the final.

== Participating clubs ==
- 48 clubs from League One and League Two.
- 16 invited Category One Academy teams.

| | League One | League Two | Academies |
|---|---|---|---|
| Clubs | Accrington Stanley; Barnsley; Bolton Wanderers; Bristol Rovers; Burton Albion; Cambridge United; Charlton Athletic; Cheltenham Town; Derby County; Exeter City; Fleetwood Town; Forest Green Rovers; Ipswich Town; Lincoln City; Milton Keynes Dons; Morecambe; Oxford United; Peterborough United; Plymouth Argyle; Port Vale; Portsmouth; Sheffield Wednesday; Shrewsbury Town; Wycombe Wanderers | AFC Wimbledon; Barrow; Bradford City; Carlisle United; Colchester United; Crawley Town; Crewe Alexandra; Doncaster Rovers; Gillingham; Grimsby Town; Harrogate Town; Hartlepool United; Leyton Orient; Mansfield Town; Newport County; Northampton Town; Rochdale; Salford City; Stevenage; Stockport County; Sutton United; Swindon Town; Tranmere Rovers; Walsall | Arsenal; Aston Villa; Brighton & Hove Albion; Chelsea; Crystal Palace; Everton; Leeds United; Leicester City; Liverpool; Manchester City; Manchester United; Newcastle United; Southampton; Tottenham Hotspur; West Ham United; Wolverhampton Wanderers |
| Total | 24 | 24 | 16 |

== Eligibility criteria for players ==
For EFL clubs

- Minimum of four qualifying outfield players in their starting XI. A qualifying outfield player was one who met any of the following requirements:
  - Any player who started the previous or following first-team fixture.
  - Any player who is in the top 10 players at the club who has made the most starting appearances in league and domestic cup competitions this season.
  - Any player with forty or more first-team starting appearances in their career, including International matches.
  - Any player on loan from a Premier League club or any EFL Category One Academy club.
- A club can play any eligible goalkeeper in the competition.
- Any player out on a long loan term at a National League, National League North, or National League South team can play as long as the loaning team agree to allow the player to return for the match.

For invited teams

- Minimum of six players in the starting line-up who are aged under 21 on 30 June 2022.
- Maximum of two players on the team sheet who are aged over 21 and have also made forty or more senior appearances.

== Competition format ==
Group stage

- Sixteen groups of four teams will be organised on a regionalised basis.
- All groups will include one invited club.
- All clubs will play each other once, either home or away (Academies will as always play all group matches away from home).
- Clubs will be awarded three points for a win and one point for a draw.
- In the event of a drawn game (after 90 minutes), a penalty shoot-out will be held with the winning team earning an additional point.
- Clubs expelled from the EFL will be knocked out of the tournament automatically.
- The top two teams in each group will progress to the knockout stage.

Knockout stage

- Round 2 and 3 of the competition will be drawn on a regionalised basis.
- In Round 2, the group winners will be seeded and the group runners-up will be unseeded in the draw.
- In Round 2, teams who played in the same group as each other in the group stage will be kept apart.

== Group stage ==
=== Northern Section ===
==== Group A ====
| Pos | Div | Team | Pld | W | PW | PL | L | GF | GA | GD | Pts | Qualification |
|---|---|---|---|---|---|---|---|---|---|---|---|---|
| 1 | ACA | Everton U21 | 3 | 1 | 1 | 1 | 0 | 10 | 4 | +6 | 6 | Advance to Round 2 |
| 2 | L1 | Morecambe | 3 | 0 | 2 | 0 | 1 | 4 | 5 | −1 | 4 | Advance to Round 2 |
| 3 | L2 | Harrogate Town | 3 | 1 | 0 | 1 | 1 | 3 | 4 | −1 | 4 | |
| 4 | L2 | Hartlepool United | 3 | 1 | 0 | 1 | 1 | 2 | 6 | −4 | 4 | |

Source: EFL.com

| 30 August 2022 | Hartlepool United | 2–0 | Harrogate Town | Hartlepool |
| 19:00 | Ndjoli 17', 33' | | | Stadium: Victoria Park; Attendance: 1,500; Referee: Anthony Backhouse |

| 30 August 2022 | Morecambe | 3–3 (7–6 p) | Everton U21 | Morecambe |
| 19:00 | Weir 17'; Watts 34'; Rawson 84' | | McAllister 32'; Price 48'; Cannon 57' | Stadium: Globe Arena; Attendance: 912; Referee: Rebecca Welch |
| | Penalties |
| | Watts (penalty scored); Phillips (penalty scored); Cooney (penalty scored); Love (penalty scored); Connolly (penalty missed); Mayor (penalty scored); McLoughlin (penalty scored); O'Connor (penalty scored) | | Cannon (penalty scored); Okoronkwo (penalty scored); Anderson (penalty scored); Hunt (penalty missed); Warrington (penalty scored); Price (penalty scored); Kouyate (penalty scored); Campbell (penalty missed) |

| 20 September 2022 | Morecambe | 0–0 (4–2 p) | Hartlepool United | Morecambe |
| 19:00 | | | | Stadium: Globe Arena; Attendance: 934; Referee: Martin Woods |
| | Penalties |
| | Weir (penalty scored); Stockton (penalty scored); Cooney (penalty scored); Love (penalty scored) | | Murray (penalty missed); Ferguson (penalty missed); Shelton (penalty scored); Crawford (penalty scored) |

| 4 October 2022 | Harrogate Town | 1–1 (2–4 p) | Everton U21 | Harrogate |
| 19:00 | Grant 72' | | Mills 10' | Stadium: Wetherby Road; Attendance: 832; Referee: Marc Edwards |
| | Penalties |
| | Armstrong (penalty missed); Pattison (penalty missed); Grant (penalty scored); Headley (penalty scored) | | Cannon (penalty scored); Okoronkwo (penalty missed); Price (penalty scored); Mills (penalty scored); Quirk (penalty scored) |

| 18 October 2022 | Harrogate Town | 2–1 | Morecambe | Harrogate |
| 19:00 | O'Boyle 28'; Welch-Hayes 90+6' | | Mayor 2' | Stadium: Wetherby Road; Attendance: 717; Referee: Darren Drysdale |

| 18 October 2022 | Hartlepool United | 0–6 | Everton U21 | Hartlepool |
| 19:00 | | | Cannon 9', 45+4'; Hunt 20'; Mills 28', 53'; Whitaker 71' | Stadium: Victoria Park; Attendance: 1,247; Referee: Adam Herczeg |

==== Group B ====
| Pos | Div | Team | Pld | W | PW | PL | L | GF | GA | GD | Pts | Qualification |
|---|---|---|---|---|---|---|---|---|---|---|---|---|
| 1 | L1 | Bolton Wanderers | 3 | 2 | 0 | 1 | 0 | 9 | 3 | +6 | 7 | Advance to Round 2 |
| 2 | L2 | Tranmere Rovers | 3 | 1 | 1 | 0 | 1 | 6 | 7 | −1 | 5 | Advance to Round 2 |
| 3 | ACA | Leeds United U21 | 3 | 1 | 0 | 1 | 1 | 5 | 6 | −1 | 4 | |
| 4 | L2 | Crewe Alexandra | 3 | 0 | 1 | 0 | 2 | 1 | 5 | −4 | 2 | |

Source: EFL.com

| 30 August 2022 | Bolton Wanderers | 4–1 | Crewe Alexandra | Bolton |
| 19:00 | Bakayoko 5'; Charles 78', 89'; Sadlier 86' | | Baker-Richardson 16' | Stadium: University of Bolton Stadium; Attendance: 2,115; Referee: Scott Oldham |

| 20 September 2022 | Tranmere Rovers | 2–2 (5–4 p) | Bolton Wanderers | Tranmere |
| 19:00 | Morris 21'; Lewis 40' | | Sadlier 72'; Carty 90+1' | Stadium: Prenton Park; Attendance: 1,779; Referee: Martin Coy |
| | Penalties |
| | Hemmings (penalty scored); Hughes (penalty scored); McAlear (penalty scored); Merrie (penalty scored); Burton (penalty scored) | | Morley (penalty scored); Afolayan (penalty scored); Isgrove (penalty missed); Sadlier (penalty scored); Sheehan (penalty scored) |

| 4 October 2022 | Tranmere Rovers | 3–5 | Leeds United U21 | Tranmere |
| 19:00 | Lewis 12'; Hughes 19'; Byrne 45+3' | | Perkins 26'; Gelhardt 28', 31'; Joseph 56'; Drameh 64' | Stadium: Prenton Park; Attendance: 816; Referee: Martin Woods |

| 18 October 2022 | Bolton Wanderers | 3–0 | Leeds United U21 | Bolton |
| 19:00 | Böðvarsson 14'; Bakayoko 78'; Sadlier 89' | | | Stadium: University of Bolton Stadium; Attendance: 2,936; Referee: Peter Wright |

| 18 October 2022 | Crewe Alexandra | 0–1 | Tranmere Rovers | Crewe |
| 19:00 | | | Nevitt 71' | Stadium: Gresty Road; Attendance: 888; Referee: Daniel Middleton |

| 1 November 2022 | Crewe Alexandra | 0–0 (2–1 p) | Leeds United U21 | Crewe |
| 19:00 | | | | Stadium: Gresty Road; Attendance: 1,236; Referee: Ben Toner |
| | Penalties |
| | Agyei (penalty scored); Uwakwe (penalty missed); Finney (penalty missed); Sambou (penalty missed); Griffiths (penalty scored) | | Klich (penalty scored); Firpo (penalty missed); Joseph (penalty missed); Perkins (penalty missed); Gyabi (penalty missed) |

==== Group C ====
| Pos | Div | Team | Pld | W | PW | PL | L | GF | GA | GD | Pts | Qualification |
|---|---|---|---|---|---|---|---|---|---|---|---|---|
| 1 | L1 | Port Vale | 3 | 3 | 0 | 0 | 0 | 7 | 0 | +7 | 9 | Advance to Round 2 |
| 2 | ACA | Wolverhampton Wanderers U21 | 3 | 2 | 0 | 0 | 1 | 4 | 4 | 0 | 6 | Advance to Round 2 |
| 3 | L2 | Stockport County | 3 | 1 | 0 | 0 | 2 | 2 | 3 | −1 | 3 | |
| 4 | L1 | Shrewsbury Town | 3 | 0 | 0 | 0 | 3 | 1 | 7 | −6 | 0 | |

Source: EFL.com

| 30 August 2022 | Shrewsbury Town | 1–2 | Wolverhampton Wanderers U21 | Shrewsbury |
| 19:00 | Hernes 76' | | Hodge 79', 90+3' | Stadium: New Meadow; Attendance: 1,413; Referee: Ollie Yates |

| 30 August 2022 | Port Vale | 1–0 | Stockport County | Stoke-on-Trent |
| 19:00 | Hussey 64' | | | Stadium: Vale Park; Attendance: 1,980; Referee: Seb Stockbridge |

| 20 September 2022 | Shrewsbury Town | 0–4 | Port Vale | Shrewsbury |
| 19:00 | | | Politic 15', 56', 57'; Walker 74' | Stadium: New Meadow; Attendance: 1,635; Referee: Ben Toner |

| 20 September 2022 | Stockport County | 1–2 | Wolverhampton Wanderers U21 | Stockport |
| 19:30 | Jennings 90+3' | | Harkin 20'; Roberts 71' | Stadium: Edgeley Park; Attendance: 1,398; Referee: Anthony Backhouse |

| 18 October 2022 | Port Vale | 2–0 | Wolverhampton Wanderers U21 | Stoke-on-Trent |
| 19:00 | Benning 80'; Odubeko 87' | | | Stadium: Vale Park; Attendance: 1,090; Referee: Scott Oldham |

| 18 October 2022 | Stockport County | 1–0 | Shrewsbury Town | Stockport |
| 19:30 | Johnson 2' | | | Stadium: Edgeley Park; Attendance: 1,054; Referee: Lewis Smith |

==== Group D ====
| Pos | Div | Team | Pld | W | PW | PL | L | GF | GA | GD | Pts | Qualification |
|---|---|---|---|---|---|---|---|---|---|---|---|---|
| 1 | L2 | Salford City | 3 | 1 | 2 | 0 | 0 | 4 | 3 | +1 | 7 | Advance to Round 2 |
| 2 | L1 | Accrington Stanley | 3 | 1 | 1 | 1 | 0 | 6 | 5 | +1 | 6 | Advance to Round 2 |
| 3 | L2 | Rochdale | 3 | 1 | 0 | 2 | 0 | 6 | 5 | +1 | 5 | |
| 4 | ACA | Liverpool U21 | 3 | 0 | 0 | 0 | 3 | 3 | 6 | −3 | 0 | |

Source: EFL.com

| 30 August 2022 | Salford City | 2–1 | Liverpool U21 | Salford |
| 19:30 | Berkoe 45'; Jenkins 59' | | Stewart 88' | Stadium: Moor Lane; Attendance: 773; Referee: Andy Haines |

| 30 August 2022 | Accrington Stanley | 3–3 (4–3 p) | Rochdale | Accrington |
| 19:45 | McConville 51'; Lowe 56'; Sinclair 90+4' (o.g.) | | Ball 65'; Henderson 67'; Brierley 72' | Stadium: Crown Ground; Attendance: 1,130; Referee: Peter Wright |
| | Penalties |
| | Savin (penalty scored); McConville (penalty scored); Leigh (penalty scored); Woods (penalty scored) | | Henderson (penalty scored); Brierley (penalty scored); Sinclair (penalty missed); Kelly (penalty scored); White (penalty missed) |

| 20 September 2022 | Rochdale | 1–0 | Liverpool U21 | Rochdale |
| 19:00 | Campbell 82' | | | Stadium: Spotland Stadium; Attendance: 1,006; Referee: Darren Handley |

| 20 September 2022 | Salford City | 0–0 (4–2 p) | Accrington Stanley | Salford |
| 19:00 | | | | Stadium: Moor Lane; Attendance: 722; Referee: Thomas Kirk |
| | Penalties |
| | Smith (penalty scored); Hendry (penalty scored); Tolaj (penalty scored); Galbraith (penalty scored) | | Savin (penalty missed); McConville (penalty scored); Coyle (penalty scored); Martin (penalty missed) |

| 18 October 2022 | Rochdale | 2–2 (2–4 p) | Salford City | Rochdale |
| 19:30 | Henderson 42'; Kelly 90+4' | | Simões 69'; Hendry 71' | Stadium: Spotland Stadium; Attendance: 1,203; Referee: Anthony Backhouse |
| | Penalties |
| | Henderson (penalty missed); Keohane (penalty missed); Brierley (penalty scored); Kelly (penalty scored) | | Hendry (penalty scored); Watt (penalty scored); Watson (penalty scored); Bailey (penalty scored) |

| 18 October 2022 | Accrington Stanley | 3–2 | Liverpool U21 | Accrington |
| 19:45 | Leigh 12', 46'; Astley 70' | | Ramsey 90+1'; Doak 90+3' | Stadium: Crown Ground; Attendance: 865; Referee: Andrew Kitchen |

==== Group E ====
| Pos | Div | Team | Pld | W | PW | PL | L | GF | GA | GD | Pts | Qualification |
|---|---|---|---|---|---|---|---|---|---|---|---|---|
| 1 | L1 | Lincoln City | 3 | 2 | 0 | 0 | 1 | 6 | 2 | +4 | 6 | Advance to Round 2 |
| 2 | L1 | Barnsley | 3 | 2 | 0 | 0 | 1 | 6 | 5 | +1 | 6 | Advance to Round 2 |
| 3 | L2 | Doncaster Rovers | 3 | 1 | 1 | 0 | 1 | 4 | 5 | −1 | 5 | |
| 4 | ACA | Newcastle United U21 | 3 | 0 | 0 | 1 | 2 | 0 | 4 | −4 | 1 | |

Source: EFL.com

| 30 August 2022 | Doncaster Rovers | 0–0 (4–2 p) | Newcastle United U21 | Doncaster |
| 19:00 | | | | Stadium: Keepmoat Stadium; Attendance: 1,685; Referee: James Oldham |
| | Penalties |
| | Hurst (penalty scored); Seaman (penalty scored); Long (penalty scored); Agard (penalty scored) | | Savage (penalty scored); Crossley (penalty scored); Turner-Cook (penalty missed); Murphy (penalty missed) |

| 30 August 2022 | Barnsley | 0–3 | Lincoln City | Barnsley |
| 19:45 | | | Bishop 15', 17'; Makama 90+3' | Stadium: Oakwell; Attendance: 3,121; Referee: Martin Woods |

| 20 September 2022 | Barnsley | 2–0 | Newcastle United U21 | Barnsley |
| 19:00 | Butterfill 79'; Larkeche 85' | | | Stadium: Oakwell; Attendance: 1,664; Referee: Scott Oldham |

| 20 September 2022 | Lincoln City | 1–2 | Doncaster Rovers | Lincoln |
| 19:00 | Vernam 49' | | Hurst 72'; Long 84' | Stadium: Sincil Bank; Attendance: 2,338; Referee: Adam Herczeg |

| 11 October 2022 | Doncaster Rovers | 2–4 | Barnsley | Doncaster |
| 19:45 | Miller 73', 81' | | Martin 11', 34'; Jalo 20', 26' | Stadium: Keepmoat Stadium; Attendance: 2,479; Referee: Marc Edwards |

| 18 October 2022 | Lincoln City | 2–0 | Newcastle United U21 | Lincoln |
| 19:00 | Mandroiu 8'; Draper 84' | | | Stadium: Sincil Bank; Attendance: 1,693; Referee: Ben Toner |

==== Group F ====
| Pos | Div | Team | Pld | W | PW | PL | L | GF | GA | GD | Pts | Qualification |
|---|---|---|---|---|---|---|---|---|---|---|---|---|
| 1 | L2 | Grimsby Town | 3 | 1 | 1 | 0 | 1 | 4 | 4 | 0 | 5 | Advance to Round 2 |
| 2 | L2 | Mansfield Town | 3 | 1 | 1 | 0 | 1 | 4 | 5 | −1 | 5 | Advance to Round 2 |
| 3 | ACA | Manchester City U21 | 3 | 1 | 0 | 1 | 1 | 6 | 5 | +1 | 4 | |
| 4 | L1 | Derby County | 3 | 1 | 0 | 1 | 1 | 5 | 5 | 0 | 4 | |

Source: EFL.com

| 30 August 2022 | Derby County | 3–1 | Grimsby Town | Derby |
| 19:00 | Mendez-Laing 6'; Sibley 42'; Bird 45' | | Kiernan 88' | Stadium: Pride Park Stadium; Attendance: 5,348; Referee: Carl Boyeson |

| 30 August 2022 | Mansfield Town | 3–2 | Manchester City U21 | Mansfield |
| 19:00 | Akins 16'; Gale 50'; Lapslie 84' | | Borges 29'; Dickson 32' | Stadium: Field Mill; Attendance: 1,804; Referee: Ross Joyce |

| 20 September 2022 | Grimsby Town | 2–0 | Mansfield Town | Cleethorpes |
| 19:30 | Khan 15'; Orsi-Dadomo 39' | | | Stadium: Blundell Park; Attendance: 912; Referee: Bobby Madden |

| 4 October 2022 | Mansfield Town | 1–1 (6–5 p) | Derby County | Mansfield |
| 19:00 | Maris 45+3' | | Dobbin 29' | Stadium: Field Mill; Attendance: 3,630; Referee: Ben Toner |
| | Penalties |
| | Akins (penalty missed); Swan (penalty scored); Lapslie (penalty scored); Hewitt (penalty scored); Law (penalty missed); Gale (penalty scored); Clarke (penalty scored); Hawkins (penalty scored) | | Mendez-Laing (penalty missed); Knight (penalty scored); Thompson (penalty scored); Forsyth (penalty missed); Cybulski (penalty scored); Roberts (penalty scored); Oduroh (penalty scored); Stearman (penalty missed) |

| 18 October 2022 | Derby County | 1–3 | Manchester City U21 | Derby |
| 19:00 | McGoldrick 38' | | Borges 27', 58', 90+1' | Stadium: Pride Park Stadium; Attendance: 3,688; Referee: Tom Nield |

| 8 November 2022 | Grimsby Town | 1–1 (4–2 p) | Manchester City U21 | Cleethorpes |
| 19:30 | Simmonds 3' | | Dickson 7' | Stadium: Blundell Park; Attendance: 1,281; Referee: Ben Speedie |
| | Penalties |
| | Holohan (penalty scored); Clifton (penalty scored); Kiernan (penalty scored); Pearson (penalty scored) | | Charles (penalty missed); Katongo (penalty scored); Bobb (penalty missed); Robertson (penalty scored) |

==== Group G ====
| Pos | Div | Team | Pld | W | PW | PL | L | GF | GA | GD | Pts | Qualification |
|---|---|---|---|---|---|---|---|---|---|---|---|---|
| 1 | ACA | Manchester United U21 | 3 | 2 | 0 | 1 | 0 | 6 | 4 | +2 | 7 | Advance to Round 2 |
| 2 | L2 | Barrow | 3 | 1 | 1 | 0 | 1 | 4 | 3 | +1 | 5 | Advance to Round 2 |
| 3 | L1 | Fleetwood Town | 3 | 0 | 1 | 2 | 0 | 4 | 4 | 0 | 4 | |
| 4 | L2 | Carlisle United | 3 | 0 | 1 | 0 | 2 | 2 | 5 | −3 | 2 | |

Source: EFL.com

| 30 August 2022 | Fleetwood Town | 1–1 (3–4 p) | Barrow | Fleetwood |
| 19:00 | Sarpong-Wiredu 30' | | Rooney 44' | Stadium: Highbury Stadium; Attendance: 866; Referee: Thomas Kirk |
| | Penalties |
| | Johnston (penalty missed); McMillan (penalty scored); Omochere (penalty scored); Garner (penalty scored); Glenfield (penalty missed) | | Rooney (penalty scored); Whitfield (penalty scored); Neal (penalty scored); Kenlock (penalty missed); Gotts (penalty scored) |

| 30 August 2022 | Carlisle United | 1–2 | Manchester United U21 | Carlisle |
| 19:30 | Devitt 66' | | McNeill 40'; Forson 71' | Stadium: Brunton Park; Attendance: 3,331; Referee: Ben Toner |

| 20 September 2022 | Carlisle United | 1–1 (4–2 p) | Fleetwood Town | Carlisle |
| 19:00 | Idehen 90' | | Garner 46' | Stadium: Brunton Park; Attendance: 1,089; Referee: Rebecca Welch |
| | Penalties |
| | Gibson (penalty scored); Stretton (penalty scored); Whelan (penalty scored); Mellish (penalty scored); Charters (penalty scored) | | Morton (penalty scored); Andrew (penalty scored); Batty (penalty missed); Vela (penalty missed) |

| 4 October 2022 | Barrow | 1–2 | Manchester United U21 | Barrow-in-Furness |
| 19:30 | Fredricson 51' (o.g.) | | McNeill 44' (pen.); Garnacho 90+2' | Stadium: Holker Street; Attendance: 2,966; Referee: Geoff Eltringham |

| 18 October 2022 | Barrow | 2–0 | Carlisle United | Barrow-in-Furness |
| 19:00 | Kay 69'; Foley 80' | | | Stadium: Holker Street; Attendance: 2,281; Referee: Seb Stockbridge |

| 18 October 2022 | Fleetwood Town | 2–2 (5–4 p) | Manchester United U21 | Fleetwood |
| 19:45 | Mendes Gomes 63'; Garner 67' | | McNeill 21' (pen.); Shoretire 90+2' | Stadium: Highbury Stadium; Attendance: 2,287; Referee: Andy Haines |
| | Penalties |
| | Johnston (penalty scored); Garner (penalty scored); Rooney (penalty scored); Lane (penalty scored); Mendes Gomes (penalty missed); Hayes (penalty scored) | | Jurado (penalty scored); Mainoo (penalty scored); Huddlestone (penalty scored); Hugill (penalty missed); Mengi (penalty scored); Shoretire (penalty missed) |

==== Group H ====
| Pos | Div | Team | Pld | W | PW | PL | L | GF | GA | GD | Pts | Qualification |
|---|---|---|---|---|---|---|---|---|---|---|---|---|
| 1 | L1 | Burton Albion | 3 | 3 | 0 | 0 | 0 | 11 | 4 | +7 | 9 | Advance to Round 2 |
| 2 | L2 | Bradford City | 3 | 1 | 0 | 1 | 1 | 5 | 7 | −2 | 4 | Advance to Round 2 |
| 3 | L1 | Sheffield Wednesday | 3 | 1 | 0 | 0 | 2 | 5 | 6 | −1 | 3 | |
| 4 | ACA | Leicester City U21 | 3 | 0 | 1 | 0 | 2 | 4 | 8 | −4 | 2 | |

Source: EFL.com

| 30 August 2022 | Burton Albion | 4–2 | Leicester City U21 | Burton upon Trent |
| 19:00 | Ahadme 4', 7'; Adeboyejo 9'; Powell 12' | | Maswanhise 38'; Fitzhugh 39' | Stadium: Pirelli Stadium; Attendance: 475; Referee: Adam Herczeg |

| 30 August 2022 | Bradford City | 3–1 | Sheffield Wednesday | Bradford |
| 19:30 | Young 36', 75'; Harratt 83' | | Smith 38' (pen.) | Stadium: Valley Parade; Attendance: 6,092; Referee: Sam Barrott |

| 20 September 2022 | Sheffield Wednesday | 2–3 | Burton Albion | Sheffield |
| 19:00 | Wilks 32'; Paterson 34' | | Winnall 8'; Smith 17'; Keillor-Dunn 51' (pen.) | Stadium: Hillsborough Stadium; Attendance: 4,577; Referee: Thomas Parsons |

| 4 October 2022 | Bradford City | 2–2 (2–4 p) | Leicester City U21 | Bradford |
| 19:30 | Oliver 11'; Sutton 49' | | Alves 62'; Maswanhise 66' | Stadium: Valley Parade; Attendance: 2,564; Referee: Anthony Backhouse |
| | Penalties |
| | Sutton (penalty missed); Gilliead (penalty scored); Pereira (penalty scored); Harratt (penalty missed) | | Fitzhugh (penalty scored); Appiah (penalty scored); Braybrooke (penalty scored); McAteer (penalty scored) |

| 18 October 2022 | Burton Albion | 4–0 | Bradford City | Burton upon Trent |
| 19:00 | Powell 10'; Adeboyejo 20'; Oshilaja 57'; Carayol 69' | | | Stadium: Pirelli Stadium; Attendance: 549; Referee: Ollie Yates |

| 18 October 2022 | Sheffield Wednesday | 2–0 | Leicester City U21 | Sheffield |
| 19:00 | Paterson 8'; Trueman 52' | | | Stadium: Hillsborough Stadium; Attendance: 3,173; Referee: Marc Edwards |

=== Southern Section ===
==== Group A ====
| Pos | Div | Team | Pld | W | PW | PL | L | GF | GA | GD | Pts | Qualification |
|---|---|---|---|---|---|---|---|---|---|---|---|---|
| 1 | L2 | Colchester United | 3 | 2 | 0 | 1 | 0 | 5 | 3 | +2 | 7 | Advance to Round 2 |
| 2 | L1 | Charlton Athletic | 3 | 2 | 0 | 0 | 1 | 6 | 3 | +3 | 6 | Advance to Round 2 |
| 3 | L2 | Gillingham | 3 | 1 | 1 | 0 | 1 | 4 | 6 | −2 | 5 | |
| 4 | ACA | Brighton & Hove Albion U21 | 3 | 0 | 0 | 0 | 3 | 4 | 7 | −3 | 0 | |

Source: EFL.com

| 31 August 2022 | Charlton Athletic | 3–0 | Gillingham | Charlton |
| 19:00 | Walker 15' (o.g.); Henry 52'; Leaburn 59' | Report | | Stadium: The Valley; Attendance: 1,888; Referee: Sunny Gill |

| 6 September 2022 | Colchester United | 2–1 | Brighton & Hove Albion U21 | Colchester |
| 19:45 | Nouble 80'; Sears 87' | | Moran 43' | Stadium: Colchester Community Stadium; Attendance: 479; Referee: Alan Young |

| 4 October 2022 | Gillingham | 3–2 | Brighton & Hove Albion U21 | Gillingham |
| 19:00 | Walker 19', 71'; Wright 76' | | Ferguson 31'; Miller 63' | Stadium: Priestfield Stadium; Attendance: 838; Referee: Sam Purkiss |

| 4 October 2022 | Colchester United | 2–1 | Charlton Athletic | Colchester |
| 19:45 | Eastman 86'; Akinde 90+1' | | Morgan 17' | Stadium: Colchester Community Stadium; Attendance: 880; Referee: Lee Swabey |

| 11 October 2022 | Gillingham | 1–1 (5–4 p) | Colchester United | Gillingham |
| 19:45 | Walker 43' | | Akinde 45' | Stadium: Priestfield Stadium; Attendance: 828; Referee: Sam Allison |
| | Penalties |
| | Walker (penalty scored); Adelakun (penalty scored); Wright (penalty scored); Kashket (penalty scored); Chambers (penalty missed); Green (penalty scored) | | Longstaff (penalty scored); Nouble (penalty missed); Newby (penalty scored); Tchamadeu (penalty scored); Chilvers (penalty scored); Marshall-Miranda (penalty missed) |

| 2 November 2022 | Charlton Athletic | 2–1 | Brighton & Hove Albion U21 | Charlton |
| 19:00 | Lavelle 45'; Payne 90+2' | | Miller 54' | Stadium: The Valley; Attendance: 662; Referee: Paul Howard |

==== Group B ====
| Pos | Div | Team | Pld | W | PW | PL | L | GF | GA | GD | Pts | Qualification |
|---|---|---|---|---|---|---|---|---|---|---|---|---|
| 1 | L2 | AFC Wimbledon | 3 | 2 | 0 | 1 | 0 | 6 | 4 | +2 | 7 | Advance to Round 2 |
| 2 | L1 | Portsmouth | 3 | 1 | 1 | 1 | 0 | 8 | 3 | +5 | 6 | Advance to Round 2 |
| 3 | L2 | Crawley Town | 3 | 1 | 1 | 0 | 1 | 9 | 7 | +2 | 5 | |
| 4 | ACA | Aston Villa U21 | 3 | 0 | 0 | 0 | 3 | 3 | 12 | −9 | 0 | |

Source: EFL.com

| 30 August 2022 | AFC Wimbledon | 2–1 | Aston Villa U21 | Wimbledon |
| 19:00 | Kalambayi 12'; Davison 52' | | Jay-Hart 29' | Stadium: Plough Lane; Attendance: 1,088; Referee: Will Finnie |

| 30 August 2022 | Crawley Town | 2–2 (6–5 p) | Portsmouth | Crawley |
| 19:45 | Telford 8' (pen.); Bremang 90+5' (pen.) | | Robertson 74'; Scarlett 81' | Stadium: Broadfield Stadium; Attendance: 2,314; Referee: Sam Allison |
| | Penalties |
| | Powell (penalty scored); Bremang (penalty scored); Craig (penalty scored); Tilley (penalty missed); Nadesan (penalty scored); Ogungbo (penalty scored); Khaleel (penalty scored) | | Scarlett (penalty missed); Hackett-Fairchild (penalty scored); Dale (penalty scored); Lowery (penalty scored); Pigott (penalty scored); Robertson (penalty scored); Freeman (penalty missed) |

| 20 September 2022 | AFC Wimbledon | 3–2 | Crawley Town | Wimbledon |
| 19:00 | Hudlin 29' (pen.); Assal 75'; Frimpong 78' | | Powell 59'; Frimpong 90+6' (o.g.) | Stadium: Plough Lane; Attendance: 903; Referee: Sam Purkiss |

| 4 October 2022 | Portsmouth | 5–0 | Aston Villa U21 | Portsmouth |
| 19:45 | Curtis 2'; Jacobs 7'; Koroma 53', 63'; Hackett-Fairchild 69' | | | Stadium: Fratton Park; Attendance: 2,805; Referee: Alan Young |

| 18 October 2022 | Crawley Town | 5–2 | Aston Villa U21 | Crawley |
| 19:45 | Davis 28'; Oteh 40', 52'; Marshall 83'; Telford 90+4' (pen.) | | Revan 13'; Lutz 82' | Stadium: Broadfield Stadium; Attendance: 896; Referee: Charles Breakspear |

| 1 November 2022 | Portsmouth | 1–1 (3–1 p) | AFC Wimbledon | Portsmouth |
| 19:45 | Curtis 15' | | Assal 50' | Stadium: Fratton Park; Attendance: 2,545; Referee: Craig Hicks |
| | Penalties |
| | Koroma (penalty scored); Hackett-Fairchild (penalty scored); Scarlett (penalty scored) | | Hudlin (penalty scored); Frimpong (penalty missed); Senior (penalty missed); Sasu (penalty missed) |

==== Group C ====
| Pos | Div | Team | Pld | W | PW | PL | L | GF | GA | GD | Pts | Qualification |
|---|---|---|---|---|---|---|---|---|---|---|---|---|
| 1 | L1 | Milton Keynes Dons | 3 | 2 | 0 | 0 | 1 | 5 | 2 | +3 | 6 | Advance to Round 2 |
| 2 | L1 | Cheltenham Town | 3 | 2 | 0 | 0 | 1 | 5 | 4 | +1 | 6 | Advance to Round 2 |
| 3 | ACA | West Ham United U21 | 3 | 2 | 0 | 0 | 1 | 3 | 3 | 0 | 6 | |
| 4 | L2 | Walsall | 3 | 0 | 0 | 0 | 3 | 1 | 5 | −4 | 0 | |

Source: EFL.com

| 30 August 2022 | Milton Keynes Dons | 1–2 | Cheltenham Town | Milton Keynes |
| 19:00 | Jules 43' | | May 8' (pen.); Brown 54' | Stadium: Stadium MK; Attendance: 1,626; Referee: Lee Swabey |

| 30 August 2022 | Walsall | 0–1 | West Ham United U21 | Walsall |
| 19:00 | | | Simon-Swyer 57' | Stadium: Bescot Stadium; Attendance: 1,582; Referee: Simon Mather |

| 20 September 2022 | Cheltenham Town | 2–1 | Walsall | Cheltenham |
| 19:00 | Nlundulu 38'; Sercombe 43' | | Johnson 86' | Stadium: Whaddon Road; Attendance: 1,275; Referee: Tom Reeves |

| 4 October 2022 | Milton Keynes Dons | 2–0 | West Ham United U21 | Milton Keynes |
| 19:00 | Dennis 63', 75' (pen.) | | | Stadium: Stadium MK; Attendance: 854; Referee: Craig Hicks |

| 18 October 2022 | Cheltenham Town | 1–2 | West Ham United U21 | Cheltenham |
| 19:00 | Brown 16' | | Greenidge 34'; Potts 49' | Stadium: Whaddon Road; Attendance: 1,526; Referee: Thomas Kirk |

| 18 October 2022 | Walsall | 0–2 | Milton Keynes Dons | Walsall |
| 19:00 | | | Lawrence 62'; Holland 90+3' | Stadium: Bescot Stadium; Attendance: 1,070; Referee: Scott Tallis |

==== Group D ====
| Pos | Div | Team | Pld | W | PW | PL | L | GF | GA | GD | Pts | Qualification |
|---|---|---|---|---|---|---|---|---|---|---|---|---|
| 1 | L2 | Stevenage | 3 | 3 | 0 | 0 | 0 | 6 | 1 | +5 | 9 | Advance to Round 2 |
| 2 | L1 | Peterborough United | 3 | 1 | 0 | 1 | 1 | 5 | 3 | +2 | 4 | Advance to Round 2 |
| 3 | L1 | Wycombe Wanderers | 3 | 0 | 2 | 0 | 1 | 1 | 4 | −3 | 4 | |
| 4 | ACA | Tottenham Hotspur U21 | 3 | 0 | 0 | 1 | 2 | 0 | 4 | −4 | 1 | |

Source: EFL.com

| 30 August 2022 | Wycombe Wanderers | 0–0 (4–3 p) | Tottenham Hotspur U21 | High Wycombe |
| 19:00 | | | | Stadium: Adams Park; Attendance: 1,015; Referee: Christopher Pollard |
| | Penalties |
| | Al-Hamadi (penalty scored); Horgan (penalty scored); McCarthy (penalty missed); Wakely (penalty scored); Young (penalty scored) | | Donley (penalty scored); John (penalty scored); Cesay (penalty missed); Alonso (penalty missed); Mathurin (penalty scored) |

| 30 August 2022 | Peterborough United | 1–2 | Stevenage | Peterborough |
| 19:30 | Jones 9' | | Taylor 18'; Piergianni 84' | Stadium: London Road Stadium; Attendance: 2,420; Referee: Robert Lewis |

| 20 September 2022 | Stevenage | 3–0 | Wycombe Wanderers | Stevenage |
| 19:30 | Rose 4', 56'; Vancooten 81' | | | Stadium: Broadhall Way; Attendance: 717; Referee: Sunny Gill |

| 20 September 2022 | Peterborough United | 3–0 | Tottenham Hotspur U21 | Peterborough |
| 19:30 | Knight 19'; Jones 32'; Marriott 51' | | | Stadium: London Road Stadium; Attendance: 1,898; Referee: Darren Drysdale |

| 18 October 2022 | Stevenage | 1–0 | Tottenham Hotspur U21 | Stevenage |
| 19:00 | Roberts 23' | | John (yellow card) 48' (yellow-red card) 84' | Stadium: Broadhall Way; Attendance: 1,449; Referee: Sam Barrott |

| 18 October 2022 | Wycombe Wanderers | 1–1 (4–3 p) | Peterborough United | High Wycombe |
| 19:00 | Horgan 60' | | Clarke-Harris 83' | Stadium: Adams Park; Attendance: 567; Referee: Paul Howard |
| | Penalties |
| | Horgan (penalty scored); Wakely (penalty missed); Obita (penalty scored); Kaikai (penalty scored); Wing (penalty missed); Freeman (penalty scored) | | Clarke-Harris (penalty scored); Watts (penalty missed); Tomlinson (penalty scored); Burrows (penalty scored); Ward (penalty missed); Edwards (penalty missed) |

==== Group E ====
| Pos | Div | Team | Pld | W | PW | PL | L | GF | GA | GD | Pts | Qualification |
|---|---|---|---|---|---|---|---|---|---|---|---|---|
| 1 | L1 | Plymouth Argyle | 3 | 2 | 1 | 0 | 0 | 5 | 2 | +3 | 8 | Advance to Round 2 |
| 2 | L1 | Bristol Rovers | 3 | 2 | 0 | 1 | 0 | 6 | 1 | +5 | 7 | Advance to Round 2 |
| 3 | ACA | Crystal Palace U21 | 3 | 1 | 0 | 0 | 2 | 2 | 3 | −1 | 3 | |
| 4 | L2 | Swindon Town | 3 | 0 | 0 | 0 | 3 | 1 | 8 | −7 | 0 | |

Source: EFL.com

| 30 August 2022 | Plymouth Argyle | 1–1 (4–3 p) | Bristol Rovers | Plymouth |
| 19:00 | Hardie 58' (pen.) | | Loft 50' | Stadium: Home Park; Attendance: 2,298; Referee: Carl Brook |
| | Penalties |
| | Azaz (penalty scored); Randell (penalty missed); Gillesphey (penalty scored); Houghton (penalty scored); Ennis (penalty scored) | | Collins (penalty scored); Evans (penalty missed); Greenslade (penalty missed); McCormick (penalty scored); Jones (penalty scored) |

| 30 August 2022 | Swindon Town | 0–2 | Crystal Palace U21 | Swindon |
| 19:00 | | | Gordon 71', 86' | Stadium: County Ground; Attendance: 2,021; Referee: Ben Speedie |

| 20 September 2022 | Swindon Town | 1–3 | Plymouth Argyle | Swindon |
| 19:00 | Hepburn-Murphy 90+1' | | Jenkins-Davies 28'; Halls 30'; Hardie 88' | Stadium: County Ground; Attendance: 2,026; Referee: David Rock |

| 4 October 2022 | Bristol Rovers | 2–0 | Crystal Palace U21 | Bristol |
| 19:00 | Kilgour 45+2'; Clarke 73' | | | Stadium: Memorial Stadium; Attendance: 1,058; Referee: James Oldham |

| 18 October 2022 | Bristol Rovers | 3–0 | Swindon Town | Bristol |
| 19:00 | Loft 63'; Anderson 76'; McCormick 83' | | | Stadium: Memorial Stadium; Attendance: 1,700; Referee: David Rock |

| 18 October 2022 | Plymouth Argyle | 1–0 | Crystal Palace U21 | Plymouth |
| 19:00 | Ennis 90+1' | | | Stadium: Home Park; Attendance: 1,918; Referee: Ben Speedie |

==== Group F ====
| Pos | Div | Team | Pld | W | PW | PL | L | GF | GA | GD | Pts | Qualification |
|---|---|---|---|---|---|---|---|---|---|---|---|---|
| 1 | L1 | Forest Green Rovers | 3 | 3 | 0 | 0 | 0 | 9 | 3 | +6 | 9 | Advance to Round 2 |
| 2 | L2 | Newport County | 3 | 2 | 0 | 0 | 1 | 5 | 4 | +1 | 6 | Advance to Round 2 |
| 3 | L1 | Exeter City | 3 | 1 | 0 | 0 | 2 | 4 | 7 | −3 | 3 | |
| 4 | ACA | Southampton U21 | 3 | 0 | 0 | 0 | 3 | 3 | 7 | −4 | 0 | |

Source: EFL.com

| 30 August 2022 | Exeter City | 1–2 | Newport County | Exeter |
| 19:00 | Chauke 52' | | Zimba 57'; Bogle 82' | Stadium: St James Park; Attendance: 1,902; Referee: Darren Drysdale |

| 30 August 2022 | Forest Green Rovers | 3–1 | Southampton U21 | Nailsworth |
| 19:00 | Cargill 37'; Bernard 45+3'; Casey 59' | | Lancashire 32' | Stadium: The New Lawn; Attendance: 726; Referee: Charles Breakspear |

| 20 September 2022 | Newport County | 1–2 | Forest Green Rovers | Newport |
| 19:45 | Evans 90+2' | | Stevenson 69'; Fiabema 79' | Stadium: Rodney Parade; Attendance: 946; Referee: Lee Swabey |

| 4 October 2022 | Exeter City | 2–1 | Southampton U21 | Exeter |
| 19:00 | Jay 40'; Chauke 45+3' | | Ballard 18' | Stadium: St James Park; Attendance: 1,074; Referee: Sunny Gill |

| 18 October 2022 | Forest Green Rovers | 4–1 | Exeter City | Nailsworth |
| 19:45 | Matt 12'; Peart-Harris 51' (pen.); Billington 54' (o.g.); O'Keeffe 63' | | Jay 41' | Stadium: The New Lawn; Attendance: 729; Referee: Sam Allison |

| 18 October 2022 | Newport County | 2–1 | Southampton U21 | Newport |
| 19:45 | Bogle 11' (pen.); Waite 60' | | Bellis 76' | Stadium: Rodney Parade; Attendance: 705; Referee: Darren Handley |

==== Group G ====
| Pos | Div | Team | Pld | W | PW | PL | L | GF | GA | GD | Pts | Qualification |
|---|---|---|---|---|---|---|---|---|---|---|---|---|
| 1 | ACA | Chelsea U21 | 3 | 2 | 0 | 0 | 1 | 5 | 4 | +1 | 6 | Advance to Round 2 |
| 2 | L2 | Sutton United | 3 | 2 | 0 | 0 | 1 | 4 | 3 | +1 | 6 | Advance to Round 2 |
| 3 | L1 | Oxford United | 3 | 1 | 0 | 0 | 2 | 6 | 4 | +2 | 3 | |
| 4 | L2 | Leyton Orient | 3 | 1 | 0 | 0 | 2 | 5 | 9 | −4 | 3 | |

Source: EFL.com

| 30 August 2022 | Oxford United | 5–0 | Leyton Orient | Oxford |
| 19:45 | Mousinho 4'; Brannagan 45+3'; Joseph 57'; Findlay 66'; Taylor 84' | | | Stadium: Kassam Stadium; Attendance: 1,373; Referee: Tom Nield |

| 31 August 2022 | Sutton United | 1–0 | Chelsea U21 | Sutton |
| 19:45 | Fadahunsi 5' | | | Stadium: Gander Green Lane; Attendance: 2,189; Referee: Alan Young |

| 20 September 2022 | Leyton Orient | 3–1 | Sutton United | Leyton |
| 19:45 | Wareham 5', 10'; James 90+1' | | Kouassi 12' | Stadium: Brisbane Road; Attendance: 1,073; Referee: Sam Allison |

| 4 October 2022 | Oxford United | 1–2 | Chelsea U21 | Oxford |
| 19:45 | Taylor 10' | | Burstow 78'; Hall 82' | Stadium: Kassam Stadium; Attendance: 1,354; Referee: Neil Hair |

| 18 October 2022 | Leyton Orient | 2–3 | Chelsea U21 | Leyton |
| 19:00 | Williams 71' (o.g.); Drinan 77' (pen.) | | Hutchinson 54'; Mothersille 89', 90+3' | Stadium: Brisbane Road; Attendance: 1,117; Referee: Lee Swabey |

| 18 October 2022 | Sutton United | 2–0 | Oxford United | Sutton |
| 19:45 | Rowe 48'; Kouassi 64' (pen.) | | | Stadium: Gander Green Lane; Attendance: 971; Referee: Sunny Gill |

==== Group H ====
| Pos | Div | Team | Pld | W | PW | PL | L | GF | GA | GD | Pts | Qualification |
|---|---|---|---|---|---|---|---|---|---|---|---|---|
| 1 | L1 | Ipswich Town | 3 | 2 | 0 | 0 | 1 | 8 | 1 | +7 | 6 | Advance to Round 2 |
| 2 | ACA | Arsenal U21 | 3 | 2 | 0 | 0 | 1 | 5 | 3 | +2 | 6 | Advance to Round 2 |
| 3 | L1 | Cambridge United | 3 | 2 | 0 | 0 | 1 | 3 | 2 | +1 | 6 | |
| 4 | L2 | Northampton Town | 3 | 0 | 0 | 0 | 3 | 1 | 11 | −10 | 0 | |

Source: EFL.com

| 30 August 2022 | Cambridge United | 0–2 | Arsenal U21 | Cambridge |
| 19:00 | | | Butler-Oyedeji 26', 57' | Stadium: Abbey Stadium; Attendance: 1,952; Referee: Neil Hair |

| 30 August 2022 | Ipswich Town | 6–0 | Northampton Town | Ipswich |
| 19:45 | Harness 11', 16'; Leigh 26'; Burgess 58'; Edmundson 83'; Ladapo 90+1' | | | Stadium: Portman Road; Attendance: 5,342; Referee: Tom Reeves |

| 20 September 2022 | Northampton Town | 0–2 | Cambridge United | Northampton |
| 19:00 | | | Okenabirhie 68', 77' | Stadium: Sixfields Stadium; Attendance: 1,230; Referee: Craig Hicks |

| 20 September 2022 | Ipswich Town | 2–0 | Arsenal U21 | Ipswich |
| 19:45 | Ball 3'; Ladapo 85' | | | Stadium: Portman Road; Attendance: 5,236; Referee: James Oldham |

| 18 October 2022 | Cambridge United | 1–0 | Ipswich Town | Cambridge |
| 19:00 | Simper 79' | | | Stadium: Abbey Stadium; Attendance: 2,548; Referee: Thomas Parsons |

| 18 October 2022 | Northampton Town | 1–3 | Arsenal U21 | Northampton |
| 19:00 | Tomlinson 8' | | Awe 56'; Cozier-Duberry 74'; Butler-Oyedeji 90+5' | Stadium: Sixfields Stadium; Attendance: 3,037; Referee: Carl Brook |

== Round of 32 ==
The draw for the Round of 32 was made on Friday 11 November 2022, with ties scheduled to take place on the week commencing 21 November. Despite finishing top of their group, Chelsea U21's match with Peterborough United was moved to London Road Stadium. However, Everton U21 were kept as the home team in their tie against Mansfield Town, which was scheduled to take place at Goodison Park. This round also saw two U21 teams, Manchester United U21 and Wolverhampton Wanderers U21, drawn together. In this case, after a consultation between both clubs and the EFL it was decided that the game would be played at Wolverhampton Wanderers' Molineux Stadium, despite Manchester United U21 finishing first in their group.

=== Northern Section ===
| 22 November 2022 | Burton Albion | 1–1 (5–4 p) | Tranmere Rovers | Burton upon Trent |
| 19:00 GMT | Carayol 90+2' | Report | Turnbull 7' | Stadium: Pirelli Stadium; Attendance: 591; Referee: Thomas Parsons |
| | Penalties |
| | Winnall (penalty scored); Taylor (penalty missed); Oshilaja (penalty scored); Dodoo (penalty scored); Butcher (penalty scored); Hamer (penalty missed); Kamwa (penalty scored) | | Hemmings (penalty scored); Hughes (penalty scored); Merrie (penalty scored); Lewis (penalty missed); Hawkes (penalty scored); O'Connor (penalty missed); Dacres-Cogley (penalty missed) |

| 22 November 2022 | Lincoln City | 1–1 (4–3 p) | Morecambe | Lincoln |
| 19:00 GMT | Hopper 53' | Report | Stockton 67' | Stadium: Sincil Bank; Attendance: 1,445; Referee: Carl Boyeson |
| | Penalties |
| | Diamond (penalty scored); Bishop (penalty scored); Sanders (penalty scored); Poole (penalty scored) | | Weir (penalty scored); Stockton (penalty scored); Cooney (penalty scored); Love (penalty missed); Shaw (penalty missed) |

| 22 November 2022 | Wolverhampton Wanderers U21 | 0–0 (1–4 p) | Manchester United U21 | Wolverhampton |
| 19:00 GMT | | Report | | Stadium: Molineux Stadium; Attendance: 1,150; Referee: Ben Toner |
| | Penalties |
| | Hodge (penalty scored); Birtwistle (penalty missed); Campbell (penalty missed) | | Jurado (penalty scored); McNeill (penalty scored); Norkett (penalty scored); Mainoo (penalty scored) |

| 22 November 2022 | Grimsby Town | 0–1 | Accrington Stanley | Cleethorpes |
| 19:30 GMT | | Report | Leigh 66' (pen.) | Stadium: Blundell Park; Attendance: 703; Referee: Martin Coy |

| 22 November 2022 | Salford City | 1–0 | Bradford City | Salford |
| 19:30 GMT | Tolaj 35' | Report | | Stadium: Moor Lane; Attendance: 578; Referee: Tom Reeves |

| 22 November 2022 | Bolton Wanderers | 3–2 | Barrow | Horwich |
| 19:45 GMT | Afolayan 23'; Böðvarsson 38'; Kachunga 69' | Report | Kay 42'; Canavan 56' | Stadium: University of Bolton Stadium; Attendance: 2,381; Referee: Rebecca Welch |

| 23 November 2022 | Port Vale | 2–1 | Barnsley | Stoke-on-Trent |
| 19:30 GMT | Politic 14'; Worrall 27' | Report | Edwards 73' | Stadium: Vale Park; Attendance: 1,306; Referee: Lewis Smith |

| 30 November 2022 | Everton U21 | 2–1 | Mansfield Town | Liverpool |
| 19:00 GMT | Higgins 90+1'; Cannon 90+4' | Report | Oates 6' | Stadium: Goodison Park; Attendance: 779; Referee: Adam Herczeg |

=== Southern Section ===
| 22 November 2022 | Forest Green Rovers | 1–1 (3–4 p) | Cheltenham Town | Nailsworth |
| 19:00 GMT | March 24' | Report | Broom 69' | Stadium: The New Lawn; Attendance: 1,425; Referee: Sunny Gill |
| | Penalties |
| | Peart-Harris (penalty scored); Wickham (penalty missed); O'Keeffe (penalty scored); Bunker (penalty scored); March (penalty missed) | | Sercombe (penalty scored); Bonds (penalty scored); Brown (penalty scored); Broom (penalty scored) |

| 22 November 2022 | Milton Keynes Dons | 3–1 | Newport County | Milton Keynes |
| 19:00 GMT | Burns 27'; Dennis 59'; Grigg 77' | Report | Tucker 85' (o.g.) | Stadium: Stadium MK; Attendance: 635; Referee: Carl Brook |

| 22 November 2022 | Plymouth Argyle | 3–2 | Charlton Athletic | Plymouth |
| 19:00 GMT | Cosgrove 13'; Ennis 15'; Roberts 46' | Report | Kanu 8'; Anderson 90+2' | Stadium: Home Park; Attendance: 1,394; Referee: Robert Lewis |

| 22 November 2022 | Stevenage | 3–2 | Arsenal U21 | Stevenage |
| 19:00 GMT | Amoo 51'; Sweeney 69'; Read 75' | Report | Butler-Oyedeji 6'; Cozier-Duberry 74' | Stadium: Broadhall Way; Attendance: 2,236; Referee: Craig Hicks |

| 22 November 2022 | Peterborough United | 2–4 | Chelsea U21 | Peterborough |
| 19:30 GMT | Clarke-Harris 26'; Taylor 61' | Report | Mothersille 18', 45+1'; Casadei 23'; Elliott 75' | Stadium: London Road Stadium; Attendance: 1,523; Referee: Christopher Pollard |

| 22 November 2022 | AFC Wimbledon | 1–0 | Sutton United | Wimbledon |
| 19:45 GMT | Hudlin 17' | Report | | Stadium: Plough Lane; Attendance: 1,854; Referee: Sam Purkiss |

| 22 November 2022 | Ipswich Town | 0–2 | Portsmouth | Ipswich |
| 19:45 GMT | | Report | Scarlett 43'; Swanson 90+4' | Stadium: Portman Road; Attendance: 5,686; Referee: Tom Nield |

| 23 November 2022 | Colchester United | 1–2 | Bristol Rovers | Colchester |
| 19:30 GMT | Sears 83' | Report | Connolly 53'; Saunders 90+5' | Stadium: Colchester Community Stadium; Attendance: 669; Referee: Thomas Kirk |

== Round of 16 ==
The draw for the round of 16 was held on 24 November 2022. The matches for this round took place on 13 December 2022 except for two ties postponed due to frozen pitches.

=== Northern Section ===
| 13 December 2022 | Burton Albion | 2–4 | Accrington Stanley | Burton upon Trent |
| 19:00 GMT | Oshilaja 7'; Tharme 23' (o.g.) | Report | Rodgers 20', 68'; Pritchard 41'; Leigh 45+5' | Stadium: Pirelli Stadium; Attendance: 390; Referee: Scott Oldham |

| 13 December 2022 | Lincoln City | 4–2 | Everton U21 | Lincoln |
| 19:00 GMT | Poole 33'; Diamond 54' (pen.), 90+8'; Roughan 72' | Report | Okoronkwo 48'; Cannon 50' | Stadium: Sincil Bank; Attendance: 1,306; Referee: Andrew Kitchin |

| 13 December 2022 | Bolton Wanderers | 4–0 | Manchester United U21 | Horwich |
| 19:45 GMT | Afolayan 68'; Morley 76'; Bakayoko 90+3'; Bradley 90+5' | Report | | Stadium: University of Bolton Stadium; Attendance: 4,735; Referee: Martin Coy |

| 20 December 2022 | Salford City | 1–0 | Port Vale | Salford |
| 19:30 GMT | Smith 10' | Report | | Stadium: Moor Lane; Attendance: 743; Referee: Anthony Backhouse |

=== Southern Section ===
| 13 December 2022 | Cheltenham Town | 4–0 | Chelsea U21 | Cheltenham |
| 19:00 GMT | Brown 4', 90'; Sercombe 87'; Broom 90+4' | Report | | Stadium: Whaddon Road; Attendance: 1,058; Referee: Simon Mather |

| 13 December 2022 | Portsmouth | 3–0 | Stevenage | Portsmouth |
| 19:00 GMT | Mingi 37'; Koroma 59'; Pigott 90+4' | Report | | Stadium: Fratton Park; Attendance: 2,162; Referee: Neil Hair |

| 13 December 2022 | Bristol Rovers | 4–1 | Milton Keynes Dons | Bristol |
| 19:30 GMT | Hoole 33'; Marquis 54', 66'; Saunders 71' | Report | Eisa 79' (pen.) | Stadium: Memorial Stadium; Attendance: 864; Referee: Declan Bourne |

| 21 December 2022 | Plymouth Argyle | 3–3 (4–3 p) | AFC Wimbledon | Plymouth |
| 19:00 GMT | Cosgrove 61', 72', 76' | | Hudlin 10', 17'; Assal 45+1' | Stadium: Home Park; Attendance: 1,747; Referee: Sam Barrott |
| | Penalties |
| | Hardie (penalty missed); Cosgrove (penalty scored); Houghton (penalty scored); Whittaker (penalty scored); Mumba (penalty scored) | | (penalty scored) Hudlin; (penalty scored) Towler; (penalty missed) Assal; (penalty missed) Fisher; (penalty scored) Chislett |

== Quarter-finals ==
The draw for the Quarter-finals was held on 15 December 2022, with the teams no longer being separated geographically in the draw. The matches are scheduled for the week beginning 9 January 2023.

| 10 January 2023 | Lincoln City | 2–2 (1–3 p) | Accrington Stanley | Lincoln |
| 19:00 GMT | Hopper 7', 80' | Report 1 Report 2 | Pressley 36', 73' (pen.) | Stadium: Sincil Bank; Attendance: 2,304 (61 away); Referee: Simon Mather |
| | Penalties |
| | Diamond (penalty scored); Mandroiu (penalty missed); Sanders (penalty missed); Poole (penalty missed) | | (penalty scored) Pressley; (penalty scored) Coyle; (penalty missed) Whalley; (penalty scored) McConville |

| 10 January 2023 | Bolton Wanderers | 1–0 | Portsmouth | Horwich |
| 19:45 GMT | Böðvarsson 17' | Report | | Stadium: University of Bolton Stadium; Attendance: 4,413 (304 Away); Referee: Bobby Madden |

| 10 January 2023 | Bristol Rovers | 0–2 | Plymouth Argyle | Bristol |
| 19:45 GMT | | Report 1, Report 2 | Waine 24'; Hardie 32' | Stadium: Memorial Stadium; Attendance: 3,742 (678 Away); Referee: Darren Drysdale |

| 10 January 2023 | Cheltenham Town | 3–1 | Salford City | Cheltenham |
| 19:45 GMT | Broom 45'; Sercombe 65'; Goodwin 66' | Report 1, Report 2 | Hendry 13' | Stadium: Whaddon Road; Attendance: 1,874 (71 away); Referee: Carl Brook |

== Semi-finals ==
The draw for the Semi-finals was held on 14 January 2023.

| 21 February 2023 | Plymouth Argyle | 1–1 (3–2 p) | Cheltenham Town | Plymouth |
| 20:00 GMT | Hardie 63' | Report 1 Report 2 | May 49' | Stadium: Home Park; Attendance: 12,047 (236 Away); Referee: Robert Lewis |
| | Penalties |
| | Hardie (penalty scored); Cosgrove (penalty scored); Azaz (penalty missed); Gillesphey (penalty scored); Houghton (penalty missed) | | (penalty scored) Sercombe; (penalty scored) Brown; (penalty missed) Broom; (penalty missed) Bonds; (penalty missed) May |

| 22 February 2023 | Accrington Stanley | 0–2 | Bolton Wanderers | Accrington |
| 20:00 GMT | | Report | Kachunga 82'; Morley 84' | Stadium: Crown Ground; Attendance: 4,874 (2,625 Away); Referee: Sam Barrott |

== Final ==
2 April 2023

| Bolton Wanderers | 4–0 | Plymouth Argyle |
|---|---|---|
| Dempsey 4'; Charles 10'; Kachunga 49'; Jones 62' | Report |

Wembley Stadium, London
Attendance: 79,389
Referee: Ben Toner
