= 2022–23 Tranmere Rovers F.C. season =

Tranmere Rovers
2022–23 season
- Chairman: Mark Palios
- Manager: Micky Mellon (until 19 March)
- Stadium: Prenton Park
- League Two: 12th
- FA Cup: First round
- EFL Cup: Second round
- EFL Trophy: Second round
- Top goalscorer: League: Josh Hawkes (10); All: Josh Hawkes (11)
Home colours

The 2022–23 season is the 139th season in the existence of Tranmere Rovers Football Club and the club's third consecutive season in League Two. In addition to the league, they will also compete in the 2022–23 FA Cup, the 2022–23 EFL Cup and the 2022–23 EFL Trophy.

== Transfers ==
=== In ===
Date	Pos	Player	Transferred from	Fee	Ref
10 June 2022 (Note: The transfer was announced on 27 May, and would become official on June 10, once the transfer window opened)	CB	(England) Ben Hockenhull	(England) Brentford	Free Transfer	
10 June 2022 (Note: The transfer was announced on 1 June, and would become official on June 10, once the transfer window opened)	CM	(England) Paul Lewis	(England) Northampton Town	Free Transfer	
1 July 2022 (Note: The transfer was announced on 14 June, and would become official on July 1, once his Reading contract expired)	LB	(England) Ethan Bristow	(England) Reading	Free Transfer	
1 July 2022	CB	(Republic of Ireland) Neill Byrne	(England) Hartlepool United	Undisclosed	
1 July 2022 (Note: The transfer was announced on 21 June, and would become official on July 1, once his Everton contract expired)	CM	(Wales) Rhys Hughes	(England) Everton	Free Transfer	
1 July 2022 (Note: The transfer was announced on 9 June, and would become official on July 1, once his Norwich City contract expired)	CM	(Scotland) Reece McAlear	(England) Norwich City	Free Transfer	
1 July 2022 (Note: The transfer was announced on 30 June, and would become official on July 1, once his Bristol Rovers contract expired)	CM	(England) Jon Nolan	(England) Bristol Rovers	Free Transfer	
1 July 2022 (Note: The transfer was announced on 21 June, and would become official on July 1, once his Oldham Athletic contract expired)	RW	(England) Jack Williams	(England) Oldham Athletic	Free Transfer	
6 July 2022	GK	(Scotland) Ross Doohan	(Scotland) Celtic	Undisclosed	
13 July 2022	CB	(England) Kyle Jameson	(England) Oldham Athletic	Free Transfer	
26 July 2022	CB	(England) Jordan Turnbull	(England) Salford City	Free Transfer	
28 July 2022	CF	(Sweden) Joel Mumbongo	(England) Burnley	Free Transfer	
12 January 2023	DM	(England) Brad Walker	(England) Port Vale	Undisclosed	
27 January 2023	CF	(England) Harvey Saunders	(England) Bristol Rovers	Undisclosed	
23 March 2023	CM	(Kosovo) Florent Hoti	(Scotland) Arbroath	Free Transfer	

=== Out ===
Date	Pos	Player	Transferred to	Fee	Ref
30 June 2022	CB	(England) Peter Clarke	(England) Walsall	Free transfer	
30 June 2022	CF	(England) Emmanuel Dieseruvwe	(England) FC Halifax Town	Free transfer	
30 June 2022 (Note: The transfer was announced on 21 June, and would become official once his contract at the club expired)	CM	(Republic of Ireland) Sam Foley	(England) Barrow	Free transfer	
30 June 2022	CB	(England) Nathaniel Knight-Percival	(England) Kidderminster Harriers	Released	
30 June 2022	LB	(England) Joe Maguire	Unattached	Released	
30 June 2022	CF	(England) Nicky Maynard	(England) Macclesfield	Released	
30 June 2022	RW	(England) Callum McManaman	Unattached	Released	
30 June 2022	DM	(England) Jay Spearing	Retired		
27 September 2022	LB	(England) Ethan Jones	(Wales) Bala Town	Free Transfer	
8 October 2022	LB	(Scotland) Calum Macdonald	(England) Stockport County	Free Transfer	
6 January 2023	CB	(Republic of Ireland) Neill Byrne	(England) Stockport County	Undisclosed	
10 January 2023	GK	(Scotland) Ross Doohan	(England) Forest Green Rovers	Undisclosed	
11 January 2023	CF	(England) Elliott Nevitt	(England) Crewe Alexandra	Undisclosed	
12 January 2023	LW	(Wales) Ethan Roberts	(Wales) Llandudno	Free Transfer	

=== Loans in ===
Date	Pos	Player	Loaned from	On loan until	Ref
21 July 2022	LB	(Scotland) Luke Robinson	(England) Wigan Athletic	End of Season	
1 September 2022	CF	(Germany) Paul Glatzel	(England) Liverpool	End of Season	
1 September 2022	CB	(England) Dynel Simeu	(England) Southampton	5 January 2023 (Note: On 5 January, Simeu was recalled to Southampton)	
16 January 2023	LW	(Scotland) Logan Chalmers	(Scotland) Dundee United	End of Season	
31 January 2023	CM	(Scotland) Regan Hendry	(England) Forest Green Rovers	End of Season	
31 January 2023	AM	(England) Jay Turner-Cooke	(England) Newcastle United	End of Season	

=== Loans out ===
Date	Pos	Player	Loaned to	On loan until	Ref
24 September 2022	RW	(England) Jack Williams	(England) Nantwich Town	24 October 2022	
18 January 2023	CM	(Wales) Rhys Hughes	(England) Chester	21 March 2023 (Note: On 21 February, Hughes' loan at Chester was extended by a further month)	
31 January 2023	CM	(Scotland) Reece McAlear	(Scotland) Ayr United	End of Season	

== Pre-season and friendlies ==
On June 16, Tranmere announced their pre-season schedule.

Win Draw Loss Fixtures

2 July 2022 Friendly	Fleetwood Town	2–2	Tranmere Rovers	Thornton-Cleveleys
15:00 BST	Nsiala 45'; Lane 90'	Report	Hemmings 2'; Burton (?)	Stadium: Poolfoot Farm; Attendance: 0 (behind-closed-doors)

5 July 2022 Friendly	Preston North End	0–1	Tranmere Rovers	Euxton
14:00 BST		Report	Nolan 80'	Stadium: Preston North End Training Ground; Attendance: 0 (behind-closed-doors)

9 July 2022 Friendly	Warrington Town	0–1	Tranmere Rovers	Warrington
15:00 BST		Report	Morris 14'	Stadium: Cantilever Park

13 July 2022 Friendly	Tranmere Rovers	1–2	Heart of Midlothian	Birkenhead
19:30 BST	Hemmings 10'		McKay 70'; Boyce 75'	Stadium: Prenton Park

16 July 2022 Friendly	Southport	1–4	Tranmere Rovers	Blowick
15:00 BST	Munro 74'	Report	Hemmings 17'; McAlear 19'; Mumbongo 51'; Hawkes 87'	Stadium: Pure Stadium; Attendance: 1,006

23 July 2022 Friendly	Tranmere Rovers	1–4	Huddersfield Town	Birkenhead
12:00 BST	McAlear 35'	Report	Jackson 44'; Diarra 51'; Rhodes 56'; Grant 76'	Stadium: Prenton Park

== Competitions ==
=== Overall record ===
Competition	First match	Last match	Starting round	Final position	Record							
Competition	First match	Last match	Starting round	Final position	Pld	W	D	L	GF	GA	GD	Win %
League Two	30 July 2022	May 2023	Matchday 1		43	14	12	17	42	46	−4	32.56
FA Cup	5 November 2022	5 November 2022	First round	First round	1	0	0	1	1	2	−1	0.00
EFL Cup	9 August 2022	24 August 2022	First round	Second round	2	0	1	1	3	4	−1	0.00
EFL Trophy	20 September 2022	22 November 2022	Group stage	Second round	4	1	2	1	7	8	−1	25.00
Total					50	15	15	20	53	60	−7	30.00

Last updated: 18 April 2023
Source: [ Soccerway]

=== League Two ===
==== League table ====
Pos	Team	Pld	W	D	L	GF	GA	GD	Pts
9	Barrow	46	18	8	20	47	53	−6	62
10	Swindon Town	46	16	13	17	61	55	+6	61
11	Grimsby Town	46	16	13	17	49	56	−7	61
12	Tranmere Rovers	46	15	13	18	45	48	−3	58
13	Crewe Alexandra	46	14	16	16	48	60	−12	58
14	Sutton United	46	15	13	18	46	58	−12	58
15	Newport County	46	14	15	17	53	56	−3	57

Source: EFL Official Website
Rules for classification: 1) Points; 2) Goal difference; 3) Number of goals scored; 4) Head-to-head results; 5) Wins; 6) Away goals; 7) Penalty points (sec 9.5); 8) 12-point sending off offences

==== Results summary ====
Overall								Home						Away					
Pld	W	D	L	GF	GA	GD	Pts	W	D	L	GF	GA	GD	W	D	L	GF	GA	GD
45	15	13	17	45	47	−2	58	10	6	6	27	19	+8	5	7	11	18	28	−10

Last updated: 29 April 2023.
Source: [ Soccerway]

==== Results by round ====
Round	1	2	3	4	5	6	7	8	9	10	11	12	13	14	15	16	17	18	19	20	21	22	23	24	25	26	27	28	29	30	31	32	33	34	35	36	37	38	39	40	41	42	43	44	45
Ground	H	A	H	A	A	H	A	H	A	A	H	A	H	A	H	H	H	A	H	A	A	H	A	A	H	H	H	A	A	H	A	H	A	H	H	A	H	A	H	A	H	A	A	H	A
Result	L	L	W	D	L	W	L	L	W	W	W	W	W	D	D	L	D	D	L	D	L	W	W	L	D	D	W	L	L	W	L	L	W	W	D	L	L	D	D	L	W	L	D	W	D
Position	18	23	15	13	17	15	16	16	14	14	11	12	9	9	9	11	10	11	12	14	15	14	14	15	15	15	13	14	15	11	12	15	13	12	12	13	14	14	14	14	11	11	13	11	11

Updated to match(es) played on 29 April 2023. Source: [ Soccerway]
A = Away; H = Home; W = Win; D = Draw; L = Loss; P = Postponed

==== Matches ====
Win Draw Loss Fixtures

On 23 June, the league fixtures were announced.

30 July 2022 1	Tranmere Rovers	1–2	Stevenage	Birkenhead
15:00 BST	Hemmings 51'; McAlear (yellow card) 90+5'	Report	List (yellow card) 28'; Reeves 40', (yellow card) 79'; Vancooten (yellow card) 57'; Roberts 84'	Stadium: Prenton Park; Attendance: 6,111; Referee: Jeremy Simpson

6 August 2022 2	Mansfield Town	1–0	Tranmere Rovers	Mansfield
15:00 BST	Harbottle 60'; Quinn (yellow card) 64'; Hawkins (yellow card) 64'	Report	Hemmings (yellow card) 41'	Stadium: One Call Stadium; Attendance: 7,128; Referee: Seb Stockbridge

13 August 2022 3	Tranmere Rovers	3–0	Gillingham	Birkenhead
15:00 BST	Nevitt 18'; Bristow 67'; Dacres-Cogley 75'	Report	Baggott (yellow card) 54'; MacDonald (yellow card) 81'	Stadium: Prenton Park; Attendance: 5,414; Referee: Scott Oldham

16 August 2022 4	Hartlepool United	0–0	Tranmere Rovers	Hartlepool
19:45 BST	Cooke (yellow card) 29'; Umerah (yellow card) 37'; Lacey (yellow card) 39'	Report	Turnbull (yellow card) 26'; Jameson (yellow card) 80'	Stadium: Suit Direct Stadium; Attendance: 4,072; Referee: Thomas Kirk

20 August 2022 5	Newport County	2–1	Tranmere Rovers	Newport
15:00 BST	Moriah-Welsh 29'; Bogle 38' (pen.); Clarke (yellow card) 82'	Report	Lewis 23' (o.g.)	Stadium: Rodney Parade; Attendance: 4,070; Referee: Tom Nield

27 August 2022 6	Tranmere Rovers	2–0	Colchester United	Birkenhead
15:00 BST	Hawkes 4'; Byrne (yellow card) 19'; Burton 83'	Report	Tchamadeu (yellow card) 73'	Stadium: Prenton Park; Attendance: 5,041; Referee: Rebecca Welch

3 September 2022 7	Leyton Orient	2–0	Tranmere Rovers	Leyton
15:00 BST	Dacres-Cogley 36' (o.g.); Kelman (yellow card) 42'; Smyth (yellow card) 47', (goal) 85'; Beckles (yellow card) 90+3'	Report	Byrne (yellow card) 80'	Stadium: Breyer Group Stadium; Attendance: 6,578; Referee: David Webb

9 September 2022	Tranmere Rovers	Postponed	Stockport County	Birkenhead
19:45 BST				Stadium: Prenton Park
Note: Fixture was postponed as a mark of respect, for the passing of Elizabeth II.

13 September 2022 8	Tranmere Rovers	1–2	Bradford City	Birkenhead
19:45 BST	Hemmings 49'; Byrne (yellow card) 53'; Hemmings (yellow card) 63'; McAlear (yellow card) 84'	Report	Cook 3', 75'; Crichlow (yellow card) 48'	Stadium: Prenton Park; Attendance: 5,864; Referee: Adam Herczeg

17 September 2022 9	Salford City	0–1	Tranmere Rovers	Salford
15:00 BST	Hendry (yellow card) 45+1'; Watt (yellow card) 87'	Report	Hawkes 34'; Turnbull (yellow card) 45+1'; Hemmings (yellow card) 55'	Stadium: Moor Lane; Attendance: 3,175; Referee: David Rock

24 September 2022 10	Walsall	0–1	Tranmere Rovers	Bescot
15:00 BST	Maddox (yellow card) 61'	Report	McAlear (yellow card) 29'; Hemmings (yellow card) 38'; Nevitt 90+6'	Stadium: Poundland Bescot Stadium; Attendance: 5,845; Referee: Ben Toner

1 October 2022 11	Tranmere Rovers	1–0	Barrow	Birkenhead
15:00 BST	Merrie (yellow card) 19'; Hawkes 25'	Report	Stevens (yellow card) 87'; Foley (yellow card) 90+3'	Stadium: Prenton Park; Attendance: 6,123; Referee: Sam Purkiss

8 October 2022 12	Sutton United	0–2	Tranmere Rovers	Sutton
15:00 BST	Eastmond (yellow card) 36'	Report	Hemmings 19' (pen.); Merrie (yellow card) 22'; Lewis 45+4'; Hawkes (yellow card) 59'	Stadium: VBS Community Stadium; Attendance: 3,007; Referee: Darren Drysdale

14 October 2022 13	Tranmere Rovers	3–0	Crewe Alexandra	Birkenhead
19:45 BST	Simeu 22'; Merrie (yellow card) 52'; Nevitt 56' 90'	Report		Stadium: Prenton Park; Attendance: 8,001; Referee: Simon Mather

22 October 2022 14	Harrogate Town	1–1	Tranmere Rovers	Harrogate
15:00 BST	Daly 37'; Headley (yellow card) 60'; Falkingham (yellow card) 83'; McArdle (yellow card) 90+4'	Report	Turnbull 56' (yellow card) 90+4'	Stadium: The EnviroVent Stadium; Attendance: 2,316; Referee: Ollie Yates

25 October 2022 15	Tranmere Rovers	1–1	Rochdale	Birkenhead
19:45 BST	Hemmings 39'; Simeu (yellow card) 90'	Report	Henderson 35'; O'Donnell (yellow card) 90+5'	Stadium: Prenton Park; Attendance: 5,742; Referee: Andy Haines

29 October 2022 16	Tranmere Rovers	0–2	Carlisle United	Birkenhead
15:00 BST		Report	Dennis 1', 54' (pen.) (yellow card) 66'; Mellish (yellow card) 90+1'	Stadium: Prenton Park; Attendance: 6,756; Referee: Carl Boyeson

1 November 2022 17	Tranmere Rovers	0–0	Stockport County	Birkenhead
19:45 GMT	O'Connor (yellow card) 34'	Report		Stadium: Prenton Park; Attendance: 6,800; Referee: Bobby Madden

12 November 2022 18	Swindon Town	1–1	Tranmere Rovers	Swindon
15:00 GMT	Wakeling 30'	Report	Hawkes 9'; Turnbull (yellow card) 34' (red card) 90+5'; Nevitt (yellow card) 59'; Simeu (yellow card) 90'	Stadium: The County Ground; Attendance: 9,425; Referee: Lee Swabey

19 November 2022 19	Tranmere Rovers	0–2	AFC Wimbledon	Birkenhead
15:00 GMT	Hawkes (yellow card) 11'; Simeu (red card) 30'; Hemmings (penalty missed) 68'; Davies (yellow card) 90+2'	Report	Chislett 8', (yellow card) 11'; Assal 82'	Stadium: Prenton Park; Attendance: 6,010; Referee: Thomas Kirk

3 December 2022 20	Northampton Town	0–0	Tranmere Rovers	Sixfields
15:00 GMT	McWilliams (yellow card) 51'	Report	Bristow (yellow card) 25'; Hemmings (yellow card) 70'; Doohan (yellow card) 79'	Stadium: PTS Academy Stadium; Attendance: 5,601; Referee: Will Finnie

10 December 2022 21	Grimsby Town	2–1	Tranmere Rovers	Cleethorpes
15:00 GMT	Kiernan 7'; Maher 58'; Khan (yellow card) 80'	Report	Lewis (yellow card) 45+2'; Burton 66'	Stadium: Blundell Park; Attendance: 5,134; Referee: Seb Stockbridge

17 December 2022	Tranmere Rovers	Postponed	Crawley Town	Birkenhead
15:00 GMT				Stadium: Prenton Park
Note: Fixture was postponed due to a frozen pitch.

26 December 2022 22	Tranmere Rovers	3–0	Doncaster Rovers	Birkenhead
15:00 GMT	Bristow (yellow card) 43'; Hemmings 45'; Morris 59'; Lewis 77'	Report	Maxwell (yellow card) 33'; Anderson (yellow card) 59'	Stadium: Prenton Park; Attendance: 7,033; Referee: Anthony Backhouse

29 December 2022 23	Barrow	1–2	Tranmere Rovers	Barrow
19:45 GMT	Stevens 38'; Gordon (yellow card) 90+3'	Report	Turnbull 6'; Lewis (red card) 77'; Hemmings 82'	Stadium: The dunes Hotel Stadium; Attendance: 3,383; Referee: Tom Reeves

1 January 2023 24	Crewe Alexandra	1–0	Tranmere Rovers	Crewe
15:00 GMT	Agyei (yellow card) 24'; Colkett 34'	Report	Davies (yellow card) 72'	Stadium: Mornflake Stadium; Attendance: 5,349; Referee: Andy Woolmer

7 January 2023 25	Tranmere Rovers	2–2	Sutton United	Birkenhead
15:00 GMT	Hawkes 39'; Mumbongo (yellow card) 42'; Hemmings 58', (yellow card) 64'; Morris (yellow card) 64'; O'Connor (yellow card) 90+6'	Report	Smith 11', 61'; Eastmond (yellow card) 64'; Bugiel (yellow card) 77'	Stadium: Prenton Park; Attendance: 5,348; Referee: Marc Edwards

14 January 2023 26	Tranmere Rovers	1–1	Walsall	Birkenhead
15:00 GMT	Turnbull (yellow card) 57'; Hawkes 78'; Morris (yellow card) 84'	Report	Monthé (yellow card) 71' (yellow-red card) 76'; Johnson 72'; White (yellow card) 89'	Stadium: Prenton Park; Attendance: 6,027; Referee: Declan Bourne

21 January 2023	Doncaster Rovers	Postponed	Tranmere Rovers	Doncaster
15:00 GMT				Stadium: Eco-Power Stadium
Note: Fixture was postponed due to a frozen pitch.

28 January 2023 27	Tranmere Rovers	1–0	Leyton Orient	Birkenhead
15:00 GMT	Beckles 82' (o.g.)	Report	Sotiriou (yellow card) 74'; Archibald (yellow card) 90'	Stadium: Prenton Park; Attendance: 5,946; Referee: Ollie Yates

4 February 2023 28	Stockport County	3–2	Tranmere Rovers	Edgeley
15:00 GMT	Knoyle 19'; Wootton 45+1'; Collar 78'	Report	Hemmings 41' (pen.); Davies (yellow card) 75'; Morris 84'	Stadium: Edgeley Park; Attendance: 10,231; Referee: Christopher Pollard

7 February 2023 29	Doncaster Rovers	2–0	Tranmere Rovers	Doncaster
19:45 GMT	Lakin (yellow card) 34'; Close 62'; Hurst 65'	Report	Hendry (yellow card) 33'; Walker (yellow card) 66'; Turnbull (yellow card) 74'	Stadium: The Eco-Power Stadium; Attendance: 5,775; Referee: Andy Haines

11 February 2023 30	Tranmere Rovers	1–0	Salford City	Birkenhead
15:00 GMT	Morris 22'; O'Connor (yellow card) 32'; Turnbull (yellow card) 40'	Report	Touray (yellow card) 37'; Watson (yellow card) 53'	Stadium: Prenton Park; Attendance: 6,516; Referee: James Oldham

14 February 2023 31	Bradford City	2–0	Tranmere Rovers	Bradford
19:45 GMT	Walker 43'; Stubbs (yellow card) 45+4'; Cook 74'; Halliday (yellow card) 83'	Report	Davies (yellow card) 45'	Stadium: University of Bradford Stadium; Attendance: 15,482; Referee: Simon Mather

18 February 2023 32	Tranmere Rovers	0–2	Mansfield Town	Birkenhead
15:00 GMT		Report	Harbottle 34', (yellow card) 62'; Keillor-Dunn 54'	Stadium: Prenton Park; Attendance: 6,282; Referee: Lee Swabey

25 February 2023 33	Stevenage	0–1	Tranmere Rovers	Stevenage
15:00 GMT	Reid (yellow card) 77'; Reeves (yellow card) 78'	Report	Hendry (yellow card) 26'; Hawkes (yellow card) 58', (goal) 73' (pen.); Dacres-Cogley (yellow card) 77'; Davies (yellow card) 85'	Stadium: The Lamex Stadium; Attendance: 3,675; Referee: Martin Woods

28 February 2023 34	Tranmere Rovers	1–0	Crawley Town	Birkenhead
19:45 GMT	Turnbull 68'; Walker (yellow card) 87'	Report	Telford (penalty missed) 80'	Stadium: Prenton Park; Attendance: 5,105; Referee: Craig Hicks

5 March 2023 35	Tranmere Rovers	1–1	Hartlepool United	Birkenhead
15:00 GMT	Hawkes 68' (pen.)	Report	Pruti (yellow card) 43'; Cooke 44'	Stadium: Prenton Park; Attendance: 6,320; Referee: James Oldham

11 March 2023 36	Gillingham	2–0	Tranmere Rovers	Gillingham
15:00 GMT	Williams 32'; Masterson 83'	Report	Hendry (yellow card) 90+1'	Stadium: MEMS Priestfield Stadium; Attendance: 5,674; Referee: Andy Woolmer

18 March 2023 37	Tranmere Rovers	1–3	Newport County	Birkenhead
15:00 GMT	Saunders (yellow card) 66'; Hendry 90+2'	Report	Wildig 25'; McNeill 30'; Bennett (yellow card) 47'; Kavanagh 82'	Stadium: Prenton Park; Attendance: 5,496; Referee: Darren Drysdale

25 March 2023 38	Colchester United	1–1	Tranmere Rovers	Colchester
15:00 GMT	Tovide (yellow card) 51'; Newby (yellow card) 59'; Chilvers 65' (pen.); Tchamadeu (yellow card) 76'; Read (yellow card) 86'; Kelleher (yellow card) 90'	Report	Saunders 13', (yellow card) 89'; Mumbongo (yellow card) 39'; Davies (yellow card) 56'; Hendry (yellow card) 59'; Dacres-Cogley (yellow card) 64'; Murphy (yellow card) 64'; Turnbull (yellow card) 70'; Bristow (yellow card) 75'	Stadium: JobServe Community Stadium; Attendance: 3,420; Referee: Carl Boyeson

31 March 2023 39	Tranmere Rovers	1–1	Harrogate Town	Birkenhead
19:45 BST	Oxley 36' (o.g.); Dacres-Cogley (yellow card) 54'; Hendry (yellow card) 63'; Turnbull (yellow card) 67'	Report	Armstrong 4'; O'Connor (yellow card) 35'; Falkingham (yellow card) 49'; Sutton (yellow card) 67'	Stadium: Prenton Park; Attendance: 5,861; Referee: Sunny Gill

7 April 2023 40	Carlisle United	2–0	Tranmere Rovers	Carlisle
15:00 BST	Dennis 3', 39'; McCalmont (yellow card) 68'; Garner (yellow card) 84'	Report	Hemmings (yellow card) 61'	Stadium: Brunton Park; Attendance: 13,410 (716 away); Referee: Thomas Kirk

10 April 2023 41	Tranmere Rovers	1–0	Swindon Town	Birkenhead
15:00 BST	Saunders 22'	Report	McEachran (yellow card) 36'; Darcy (yellow card) 89'	Stadium: Prenton Park; Attendance: 5,654; Referee: Andrew Kitchen

15 April 2023 42	Crawley Town	2–1	Tranmere Rovers	Crawley
15:00 BST	Oteh 30'; Powell 40'; Gordon (yellow card) 77'; Grant (yellow card) 90+2'	Report	Saunders 8'; Hendry (yellow card) 19'; Hemmings (penalty missed) 82'; Turnbull (yellow card) 85'; Turner-Cooke (yellow card) 89'	Stadium: Broadfield Stadium; Attendance: 2,812; Referee: Alan Young

18 April 2023 43	Rochdale	2–2	Tranmere Rovers	Rochdale
19:45 BST	Dodgson (yellow card) 58'; Lloyd 69'; Ebanks-Landell 90+3'	Report	O'Donnell 19' (o.g.); Hawkes 56' (pen.); Hemmings (yellow card) 82'	Stadium: Crown Oil Arena; Attendance: 2,263; Referee: Scott Tallis

22 April 2023 44	Tranmere Rovers	2–0	Grimsby Town	Birkenhead
15:00 BST	Hawkes 33' (pen.); Hughes 48'; Turnbull (yellow card) 70'	Report	Hunt (yellow card) 89'; Lloyd (yellow card) 90+5'	Stadium: Prenton Park; Attendance: 5,600; Referee: Marc Edwards

29 April 2023 45	AFC Wimbledon	1–1	Tranmere Rovers	Wimbledon
15:00 BST	Al-Hamadi 68'	Report	Taylor 79'	Stadium: Cherry Red Records Stadium; Attendance: 8,106; Referee: Martin Woods

8 May 2023 46	Tranmere Rovers	0–1	Northampton Town	Birkenhead
12:30 BST	Davies (yellow card) 71'	Report	Hoskins 5'; Hylton (yellow card) 90+6'	Stadium: Prenton Park; Attendance: 8,225 (2,200); Referee: Craig Hicks
Note: Live on Sky Sports

=== FA Cup ===
Rovers were drawn away to Carlisle United in the first round.

Win Draw Loss Fixtures

5 November 2022 First round	Carlisle United	2–1	Tranmere Rovers	Carlisle
15:00 GMT	Gibson 30'; Harris 66' (yellow card) 74'; Armer (yellow card) 85'	Report	Davies (yellow card) 50'; Byrne 82'	Stadium: Brunton Park; Attendance: 4,154; Referee: Declan Bourne

=== EFL Cup ===
Win Draw Loss Fixtures

Tranmere were drawn away to Accrington Stanley in the first round and at home to Newcastle United in the second round.

9 August 2022 First round	Accrington Stanley	2–2 (11–12 p)	Tranmere Rovers	Accrington
19:45 BST	Adedoyin 37'; Astley 39'; Clark (yellow card) 90+2'	Report	Hawkes 62'; Astley 90+3' (o.g.)	Stadium: Wham Stadium; Attendance: 1,035; Referee: Robert Lewis
	Penalties
	McConville (penalty scored); Whalley (penalty scored); Pritchard (penalty missed); Astley (penalty scored); Pell (penalty scored); Clark (penalty scored); Woods (penalty scored); Coyle (penalty scored); Sangare (penalty scored); Rodgers (penalty scored); Jensen (penalty scored); McConville (penalty scored); Whalley (penalty missed)		Hemmings (penalty scored); Hawkes (penalty scored); Hughes (penalty missed); Lewis (penalty scored); Robinson (penalty scored); McAlear (penalty scored); Byrne (penalty scored); Dacres-Cogley (penalty scored); Bristow (penalty scored); Mumbongo (penalty scored); Hewelt (penalty scored); Hemmings (penalty scored); Hawkes (penalty scored)

24 August 2022 Second round	Tranmere Rovers	1–2	Newcastle United	Birkenhead
19:45 BST	Nevitt 21'; Hemmings (yellow card) 45+4'	Report	Lascelles 40'; Wood 52'	Stadium: Prenton Park; Attendance: 10,961; Referee: Anthony Backhouse

=== EFL Trophy ===
On 20 June, the initial Group stage draw was made, grouping Tranmere Rovers with Bolton Wanderers and Crewe Alexandra.

Pos	Div	Team	Pld	W	PW	PL	L	GF	GA	GD	Pts	Qualification
1	L1	Bolton Wanderers	3	2	0	1	0	9	3	+6	7	Advance to Round 2
2	L2	Tranmere Rovers	3	1	1	0	1	6	7	−1	5	Advance to Round 2
3	ACA	Leeds United U21	3	1	0	1	1	5	6	−1	4	
4	L2	Crewe Alexandra	3	0	1	0	2	1	5	−4	2	

Source: EFL.com

Win Draw Loss Fixtures

20 September 2022 Group stage	Tranmere Rovers	2–2 (5–4 p)	Bolton Wanderers	Birkenhead
19:00 BST	Morris 21'; Lewis (yellow card) 37', (goal) 40'; Simeu (yellow card) 64'; Lomax (yellow card) 71'	Report	Sadlier 72'; Carty 90+1'	Stadium: Prenton Park; Attendance: 1,779; Referee: Martin Coy
	Penalties
	Hemmings (penalty scored); Hughes (penalty scored); McAlear (penalty scored); Merrie (penalty scored); Burton (penalty scored)		Morley (penalty scored); Afolayan (penalty scored); Isgrove (penalty missed); Sadlier (penalty scored); Sheehan (penalty scored)

4 October 2022 Group stage	Tranmere Rovers	3–5	Leeds United U21	Birkenhead
19:00 BST	Lewis 12' (yellow card) 25'; Hughes 19'; Byrne 45+3'; Jameson (yellow card) 69'; Nevitt (yellow card) 81'; Nolan (yellow card) 84'	Report	Perkins 26'; Gelhardt 28' 31'; Greenwood (yellow card) 45+2' (red card) 69'; Joseph 56'; Gyabi (yellow card) 60'; Drameh 64'; Gnonto (yellow card) 87'	Stadium: Prenton Park; Attendance: 816; Referee: Martin Woods

18 October 2022 Group stage	Crewe Alexandra	0–1	Tranmere Rovers	Crewe
19:00 BST	Finney (yellow card) 35'	Report	O'Connor (yellow card) 49'; Jameson (yellow card) 55'; Nevitt 71'	Stadium: Mornflake Stadium; Attendance: 888; Referee: Daniel Middleton

22 November 2022 Second round	Burton Albion	1–1 (5–4 p)	Tranmere Rovers	Burton upon Trent
19:00 GMT	Taylor (yellow card) 70'; Carayol 90+2'		Turnbull 7', (yellow card) 33'; Merrie (yellow card) 84'; Hemmings (yellow card) 90+1'	Stadium: Pirelli Stadium; Attendance: 591; Referee: Thomas Parsons
	Penalties
	Winnall (penalty scored); Taylor (penalty missed); Oshilaja (penalty scored); Dodoo (penalty scored); Butcher (penalty scored); Hamer (penalty missed); Kamwa (penalty scored)		Hemmings (penalty scored); Hughes (penalty scored); Merrie (penalty scored); Lewis (penalty missed); Hawkes (penalty scored); O'Connor (penalty missed); Dacres-Cogley (penalty missed)
