= George Nugent =

George Nugent may refer to:

- Sir George Nugent, 1st Baronet (1757–1849), British Field Marshal and Governor of Jamaica, MP for Buckingham and Aylesbury
- George Nugent, 7th Earl of Westmeath (1760–1814), Lord Delvin, Irish MP for Fore
- George Nugent, 1st Marquess of Westmeath (1785–1871), Irish peer
- Richard Nugent, Baron Nugent of Guildford (George Richard Hodges Nugent, 1907–1994), British Member of Parliament for Guildford
- George Colborne Nugent (1864–1915), British Army officer
- George Nugent (footballer) (born 2001), English footballer

== See also ==
- George Nugent-Grenville, 2nd Baron Nugent (1788–1850), Irish MP
- George Nugent-Temple-Grenville, 1st Marquess of Buckingham (1753–1813), British statesman
