= Jake Burton =

English footballer (born 2001)

Personal information
- Full name: Jake Joshua Burton
- Date of birth: 15 November 2001 (age 24)
- Place of birth: Liverpool, England
- Position: Forward

Team information
- Current team: Prescot Cables (on loan from Warrington Rylands)

Youth career
- Tranmere Rovers

Senior career*
Years	Team	Apps	(Gls)
2020–2023	Tranmere Rovers	26	(2)
2021	→ Stalybridge Celtic (loan)	8	(3)
2022	→ Stalybridge Celtic (loan)	6	(1)
2022	→ Marine (loan)	4	(2)
2023–2024	Chester	2	(0)
2023	→ Marine (loan)	2	(0)
2023–2024	→ Bootle (loan)	24	(6)
2024–	Warrington Rylands	30	(10)
2026–	→ Prescot Cables (loan)	5	(4)
- * Club domestic league appearances and goals as of 08:55, 12 October 2026 (UTC)

Jake Joshua Burton (born 15 November 2001) is an English professional footballer who plays as a forward for Prescot Cables on loan from Northern Premier League Premier Division side Warrington Rylands.

== Playing career ==
=== Tranmere Rovers ===
Burton graduated through the academy at Tranmere Rovers, breaking into the first team squad alongside George Nugent and Kyle Hayde. He made his first team debut for the club in a 2–1 defeat to Leicester City F.C. Under-21's in the 2019–20 EFL Trophy, and signed his first professional contract in July 2020. He made his English Football League debut on 10 October 2020 starting in a match against Salford City. He made one further league appearance that season, played in an FA Cup match and featured in Tranmere's losing 2021 EFL Trophy Final appearance against Sunderland on 14 March 2021.

Burton returned from a loan spell for the start of the 2022-23 season, scoring in the clubs first pre-season friendly; a 2-2 draw against Fleetwood, and appeared as a 65th minute substitute in the clubs 2nd pre-season friendly, a 1-0 victory over Preston North End.

After a short loan spell at Marine, Burton was recalled prior to the visit of Colchester United & replaced Elliott Nevitt in the 80th minute of the game. He scored his first senior goal for the club after just 3 minutes on the pitch; latching on to a Paul Lewis cross to head home Tranmere's second goal of the game.

==== Non-League ====
In September 2021 he went on a month's loan to Stalybridge Celtic. This loan was twice extended by a month each time until the end of the year. He made 15 appearances for the club, including 11 in the Northern Premier League, scoring three goals. He returned to the club towards the end of March 2022 for a second loan spell.

Burton joined Marine at the start of the 2022–23 season, initially on loan until January 2023, but was recalled after one month, having played in all 4 of Marine's league games; scoring twice.

On 9 May 2023 Tranmere announced he was being released.

He signed for Chester in July 2023 and rejoined Marine on loan in August. He was recalled by Chester in October 2023, and was later sent out on loan to Bootle.

Following his release from Chester, he signed for Warrington Rylands on 10 June 2024.

In September 2026 he joined on loan.

== Career statistics ==
As of match played 23 July 2025

Appearances and goals by club, season and competition
Club	Season	League			FA Cup		EFL Cup		Other		Total	
Club	Season	Division	Apps	Goals	Apps	Goals	Apps	Goals	Apps	Goals	Apps	Goals
Tranmere Rovers	2019–20	League One	0	0	0	0	0	0	1 (Note: Appearance(s) in EFL Trophy)	0	1	0
Tranmere Rovers	2020–21	League Two	2	0	1	0	0	0	1	0	4	0
Tranmere Rovers	2021–22	League Two	1	0	0	0	0	0	0	0	1	0
Tranmere Rovers	2022–23	League Two	23	2	0	0	0	0	3	0	26	2
Tranmere Rovers	Total		26	2	1	0	0	0	5	0	32	2
Stalybridge Celtic (loan)	2021–22	NPL Premier Division	16	4	0	0	—		4 (Note: Three appearances in FA Trophy, one appearance in Cheshire Senior Cup)	0	20	4
Marine (loan)	2022–23	NPL Premier Division	4	2	0	0	—		0	0	4	2
Chester	2023–24	National League North	2	0	—		—		0	0	2	0
Marine (loan)	2023–24	NPL Premier Division	2	0	3	0	—		0	0	5	0
Bootle (loan)	2023–24	NPL Division One West	24	6	—		—		3 (Note: One appearance in FA Trophy, one appearance in Liverpool Senior Cup, one appearance in NPL Division One West play-offs)	0	27	6
Warrington Rylands	2024–25	NPL Premier Division	30	10	1	2	—		2 (Note: Appearance(s) in FA Trophy)	0	33	12
Career total			104	24	5	2	0	0	14	0	123	26

== Honours ==
Tranmere Rovers

- EFL Trophy runner-up: 2020–21
