= 2021 FA Vase final =

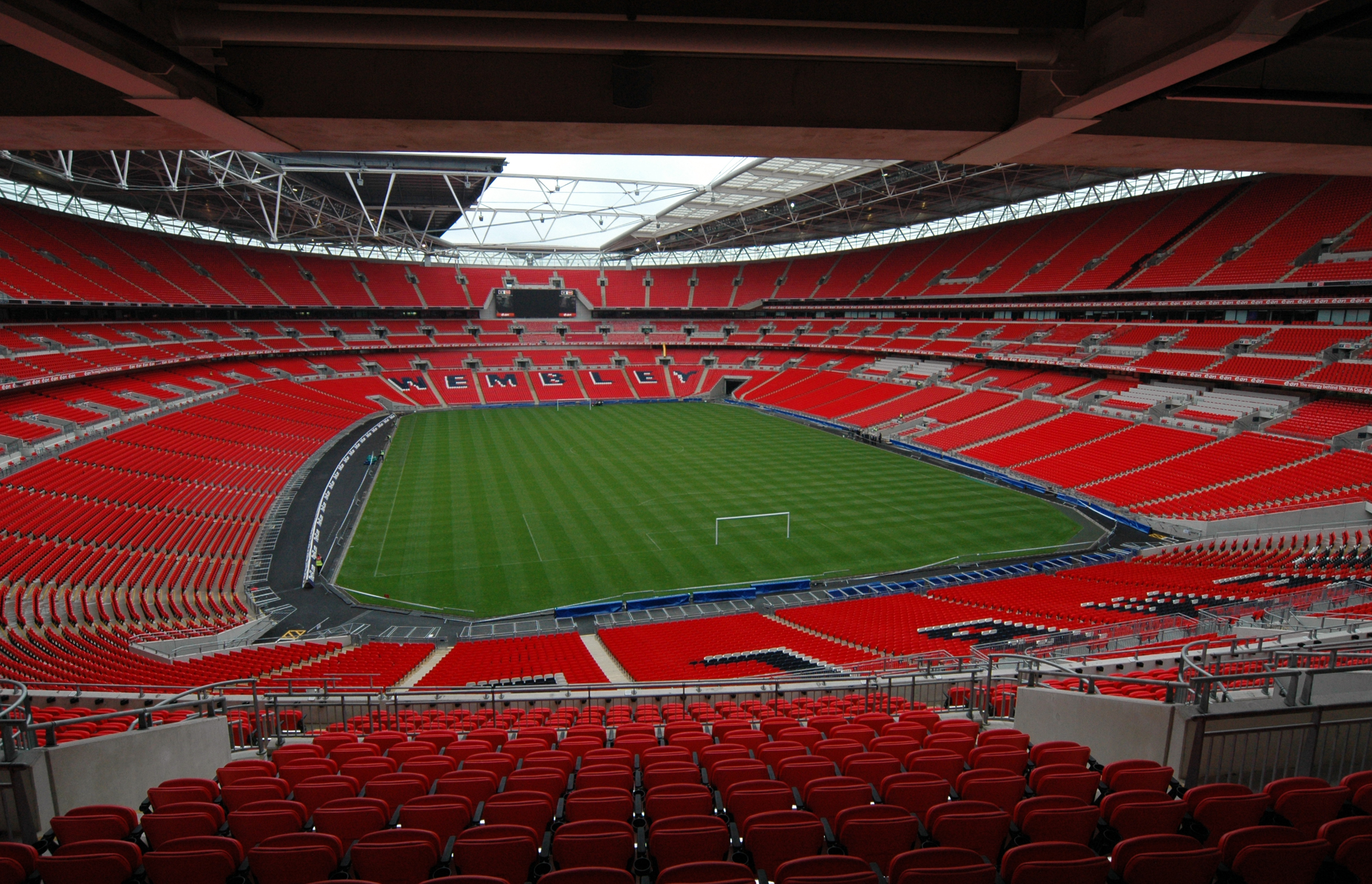
- Wembley Stadium hosted the final
- Event: 2020–21 FA Vase
| Binfield | Warrington Rylands 1906 |
| 2 | 3 |
- Date: 22 May 2021
- Venue: Wembley Stadium, London

The 2021 FA Vase final was the 47th final of the Football Association's cup competition for teams at levels 9–11 of the English football league system. The match was contested between Binfield, of the Hellenic League Premier Division, and Warrington Rylands 1906, of the North West Counties League Premier Division.

== Route to the Final ==
=== Binfield ===
| 5 December 2020 Second round | Newhaven | 2–2 (1–4 p) | Binfield | Newhaven |
| 15:00 | | | | Stadium: Fort Road; Attendance: 129 |

| 19 December 2020 Third round | Deal Town | P–P | Binfield | Deal |
| 15:00 | | | | Stadium: Charles Sports Ground |

| 27 December 2020 Third round | Deal Town | P–P | Binfield | Deal |
| 15:00 | | | | Stadium: Charles Sports Ground |

| 10 April 2021 Third round | Deal Town | 1–4 | Binfield | Deal |
| 15:00 | | | | Stadium: Charles Sports Ground; Attendance: 0 |

| 17 April 2021 Fourth round | Fakenham Town | 2–2 (1–4 p) | Binfield | Fakenham |
| 12:30 | | | | Stadium: Clipbush Park; Attendance: 0 |

| 24 April 2021 Fifth round | Hadley | 0–0 (4–5 p) | Binfield | Arkley |
| 15:00 | | | | Stadium: Brickfield Lane; Attendance: 0 |

| 1 May 2021 Quarter-Final | Long Eaton United | 0–5 | Binfield | Long Eaton |
| 15:00 | | | | Stadium: Grange Park; Attendance: 0 |

| 8 May 2021 Semi-Final | United Services Portsmouth | 1–1 (3–4 p) | Binfield | Portsmouth |
| 15:00 | | | | Stadium: The Victory Stadium; Attendance: 0 |

=== Warrington Rylands ===
| 19 September 2020 First round qualifying | Daisy Hill | 2–5 | Warrington Rylands 1906 | Westhoughton |
| 15:00 | | | | Stadium: New Sirs; Attendance: 66 |

| 10 October 2020 Second round qualifying | Warrington Rylands 1906 | 6–0 | Goole | Warrington |
| 15:00 | | | | Stadium: Gorsey Lane; Attendance: 177 |

| 31 October 2020 First round | Warrington Rylands 1906 | 2–0 | Padiham | Warrington |
| 15:00 | | | | Stadium: Gorsey Lane; Attendance: 152 |

| 5 December 2020 Second round | Jarrow | P–P | Warrington Rylands 1906 | Jarrow |
| 15:00 | | | | Stadium: Perth Green |

| 12 December 2020 Second round | Jarrow | 1–1 (4–5 p) | Warrington Rylands 1906 | Jarrow |
| 15:00 | | | | Stadium: Perth Green; Attendance: 79 |

| 19 December 2020 Third round | Longridge Town | 1–2 | Warrington Rylands 1906 | Warrington |
| 15:00 | | | | Stadium: Gorsey Lane; Attendance: 91 |
Note: Match played at Warrington Rylands 1906

| 17 April 2021 Fourth round | Shildon | 0–0 (4–5 p) | Warrington Rylands 1906 | Shildon |
| 12:30 | | | | Stadium: Dean Street; Attendance: 0 |

| 24 April 2021 Fifth round | Warrington Rylands 1906 | 1–1 (3–1 p) | West Auckland Town | Warrington |
| 15:00 | | | | Stadium: Gorsey Lane; Attendance: 0 |

| 8 May 2021 Quarter-Final | Warrington Rylands 1906 | 1–0 | Hebburn Town | Warrington |
| 15:00 | | | | Stadium: Gorsey Lane; Attendance: 0 |

| 15 May 2021 Semi-Final | Warrington Rylands 1906 | 2–1 | Walsall Wood | Warrington |
| 15:00 | | | | Stadium: Gorsey Lane; Attendance: 0 |

== Match ==
=== Details ===
22 May 2021
12:15 BST

| Binfield | 2–3 | Warrington Rylands 1906 |
|---|---|---|
| Ferdinand 42', 67' | | Nevitt 25', 44' (pen.), 59' |

Wembley Stadium, London

| Chris Grace |
| Elliott Legg | (substituted off) 72' |
| Liam Gavin |
| Jamie McClurg |
| Dave Hancock |
| George Short | (substituted off) 64' |
| Tom Willment |
| Kensley Maloney |
| Sean Moore (c) |
| Liam Ferdinand | 42', 67' |
| Oliver Harris | (substituted off) 72' |
Substitutes:
| Jack Broome |
| Josh Helmore |
| Josh Howell | (substituted on) 64' |
| Jemel Johnson |
| Asa Povey | (substituted on) 72' |
| Jack Thomson-Wheeler | (substituted on) 72' |
| Phil Veal |
Managers: Jamie McClurg & Carl Withers

| Graeme McCall |
| Jack Tinning | (substituted off) 76' |
| Warren Gerrard |
| Joe Coveney | (substituted off) 62' |
| Rick Smith |
| Gary Kenny (c) |
| Kane Drummond |
| Charlie Doyle |
| Andy Scarisbrick |
| Stephen Milne | (substituted off) 89' |
| Elliott Nevitt | 25', 44' (pen.), 59' |
Substitutes:
| Joe Denman |
| Michael Emery |
| Tom Freeman | (substituted on) 76' |
| Callum Lees |
| Freddie Potter | (substituted on) 89' |
| Paul Shanley |
| Sam Sheen | (substituted on) 62' |
Manager: Dave McNabb

Man of the match:

Match officials

- Assistant referees:
- Fourth official:

Match rules

- 90 minutes.
- 30 minutes of extra-time if necessary.
- Penalty shoot-out if scores still level.
- Seven named substitutes.
- Maximum of three substitutions.
- Fourth substitute allowed in extra-time.
