= Rhys Hughes (footballer) =

Welsh footballer (born 2001)

Personal information
- Full name: Rhys Alex Hughes
- Date of birth: 21 September 2001 (age 25)
- Place of birth: Wrexham, Wales
- Position: Midfielder

Team information
- Current team: The New Saints
- Number: 20

Youth career
- 2008–2020: Everton

Senior career*
| Years | Team | Apps | (Gls) |
| 2020–2022 | Everton | 0 | (0) |
| 2022–2024 | Tranmere Rovers | 18 | (1) |
| 2023 | → Chester (loan) | 10 | (2) |
| 2023–2024 | → Curzon Ashton (loan) | 27 | (1) |
| 2024–2026 | Connah's Quay Nomads | 47 | (22) |
| 2026– | The New Saints | 16 | (11) |

International career^{‡}
| 2017 | Wales U17 | 3 | (0) |
| 2019 | Wales U19 | 1 | (0) |
| 2020 | Wales U20 | 1 | (0) |
| 2021–2022 | Wales U21 | 10 | (0) |
- * Club domestic league appearances and goals as of 06:43, 7 November 2026 (UTC) ‡ National team caps and goals as of 00:00, 14 June 2022 (UTC)

Rhys Alex Hughes (born 21 September 2001) is a Welsh professional footballer who plays as a midfielder for Cymru Premier club The New Saints. He is a former Wales under-21 international.

== Club career ==
=== Everton ===
Hughes joined the Academy at Everton at the age of six. He moved into club digs at the age of fourteen, though still managed to go on to achieve four A and four A* grades at GCSE. He signed a two-and-a-half-year professional contract in January 2020, and scored three goals and provided six assists from fifteen league games for the under-18 team during the 2019–20 season. He was promoted to the under-23 team at the end of the campaign; Hughes stated that "with Unsy, [assistant manager] John Ebbrell and [Under-23s coach] Franny Jeffers, it's a really good place to improve". He was named as the Keith Tamlin Award winner, an award which "represents all that is best in the Everton Youth Academy". He was nominated for the Premier League 2 Player of the Month award for January 2021, having scored in a 1–1 draw with Liverpool U23. However he was not offered a new contract when his deal expired in summer 2022.

=== Tranmere Rovers ===
On 21 June 2022, Hughes signed a two-year contract with EFL League Two club Tranmere Rovers. He made his debut for the club on 9 August, coming on as an 82nd-minute substitute for Lee O'Connor in a 2–2 draw at Accrington Stanley in the EFL Cup. He scored his first career goal at Prenton Park on 4 October, in a 5–3 defeat to Leeds United U23 in the EFL Trophy.

In January 2023, he joined National League North promotion challengers Chester on an initial 28-day loan.

On 17 November 2023, Hughes joined National League North club Curzon Ashton on an initial one-month loan deal.

Hughes was released at the end of the 2023–24 season.

=== Connah's Quay Nomads ===
On 1 August 2024, Hughes joined Cymru Premier club Connah's Quay Nomads. in January 2025 he signed a new contract with the club, up to at least the end of the 2025–26 season.

=== The New Saints ===
On 2 April 2026, Connah's Quay Nomads announced that he would leave the club at the end of the season and join The New Saints. The Saints announced on 27 May that he would join them when the transfer window opened on 16 June.

== Style of play ==
Hughes is a midfielder with an excellent passing range and close ball control skills. David Unsworth described him as "an outstanding footballer with great technique and a great set-ball delivery".

== Career statistics ==
As of 10 November 2025

Appearances and goals by club, season and competition
| Club | Season | League | | | National Cup | | League Cup | | Other | | Total | |
| Club | Season | Division | Apps | Goals | Apps | Goals | Apps | Goals | Apps | Goals | Apps | Goals |
|---|---|---|---|---|---|---|---|---|---|---|---|---|
| Everton U21 | 2021–22 | — | — | | — | | — | | 1 (Note: Appearance(s) in EFL Trophy) | 0 | 1 | 0 |
| Tranmere Rovers | 2022–23 | League Two | 18 | 1 | 0 | 0 | 1 | 0 | 4 | 1 | 23 | 2 |
| Tranmere Rovers | 2023–24 | League Two | 0 | 0 | 0 | 0 | 0 | 0 | 2 | 0 | 2 | 0 |
| Tranmere Rovers | Total | | 18 | 1 | 0 | 0 | 1 | 0 | 6 | 1 | 25 | 2 |
| Chester (loan) | 2022–23 | National League North | 10 | 2 | 0 | 0 | — | | 0 | 0 | 10 | 2 |
| Curzon Ashton (loan) | 2023–24 | National League North | 27 | 1 | 0 | 0 | — | | 5 (Note: Two appearances in FA Trophy, three appearances and three goals in Manchester Premier Cup) | 3 | 32 | 4 |
| Connah's Quay Nomads | 2024–25 | Cymru Premier | 32 | 15 | 6 | 2 | 2 | 1 | 0 | 0 | 40 | 18 |
| Connah's Quay Nomads | 2025–26 | Cymru Premier | 15 | 7 | 1 | 0 | 2 | 1 | 0 | 0 | 18 | 8 |
| Connah's Quay Nomads | Total | | 47 | 22 | 7 | 2 | 4 | 2 | 0 | 0 | 58 | 26 |
| Career total | | | 102 | 26 | 6 | 2 | 5 | 2 | 11 | 4 | 125 | 34 |
