= Kane Hemmings =

English footballer (born 1992)

Personal information
- Full name: Kane Ruudi Hemmings
- Date of birth: 8 April 1992 (age 34)
- Place of birth: Burton upon Trent, England
- Height: 6 ft 1 in (1.86 m)
- Position: Striker

Team information
- Current team: Altrincham
- Number: 28

Youth career
- 2005–2008: Tamworth
- 2008–2011: Rangers

Senior career*
Years	Team	Apps	(Gls)
2011–2013	Rangers	9	(1)
2013	→ Cowdenbeath (loan)	12	(7)
2013–2014	Cowdenbeath	31	(18)
2014–2015	Barnsley	23	(3)
2015–2016	Dundee	37	(21)
2016–2018	Oxford United	40	(6)
2017–2018	→ Mansfield Town (loan)	37	(15)
2018–2019	Notts County	38	(14)
2019–2020	Dundee	25	(10)
2020–2022	Burton Albion	54	(19)
2022–2023	Tranmere Rovers	62	(16)
2023–2024	Stevenage	34	(5)
2024–2025	Crewe Alexandra	20	(4)
2025–2026	Barrow	14	(0)
2026–	Altrincham	2	(0)
- * Club domestic league appearances and goals as of 23:34, 3 September 2026 (UTC)

Kane Ruudi Hemmings (born 8 April 1992) is an English professional footballer who plays as a striker for National League club Altrincham. He has previously played for Tamworth, Rangers, Cowdenbeath, Dundee (twice), Barnsley, Oxford United, Mansfield Town, Notts County, Burton Albion, Tranmere Rovers, Stevenage, Crewe Alexandra and Barrow.

== Career ==
Hemmings had trials at Midlands clubs, including Derby County and Birmingham City. At aged 13 he moved from playing in the Burton and District Football League to Tamworth, where he won top goal scorer award in the 2006–07 season.

=== Rangers ===
After three successful years with Tamworth, Hemmings signed a two-year contract with Rangers in 2008. He progressed through the reserve and youth squads, appearing in three Scottish Youth Cup Finals, and captained the under-19 team. He signed a new contract with the club in December 2010.

He appeared in the first-team squad as an unused substitute occasionally during the 2010–11 season. Hemmings made his first on-field appearance in the UEFA Champions League qualifier against Malmö FF on 3 August 2011 in which Rangers were beaten 2–1 on aggregate. After the 2011–12 season, Rangers entered administration, then were liquidated and many players consequently departed, Hemmings was among those who stayed, and attended training in late June. Hemmings suffered a knee injury that would rule him out for five months after surgery. On suffering the injury he said he expected to be in the first team once he got back fit.

After being recalled by Rangers, he made his first appearance for the club on 2 March 2013, coming on as a substitute for Lee McCulloch in the 87th minute, as Rangers won 3–1 against East Stirlingshire. Three weeks later, on 24 March 2013, Hemmings made his first start, as a lone striker, against Stirling Albion. During the match, he missed several chances to get his first goal for the club. On 7 April, he scored his first Rangers goal, coming on as a second-half substitute for Anestis Argyriou at Hampden Park and curling a shot in from the edge of the box after a pass by David Templeton, as Rangers won 4–1 against Queen's Park. On 21 June 2013 it was announced that Hemmings would be leaving Rangers at the end of his current contract.

=== Cowdenbeath ===
Upon returning from injury, Hemmings left Rangers to join Cowdenbeath on loan until the end of January. The day after joining the club, he made his debut, in a 1–1 draw against Greenock Morton. On 12 January 2013, Hemmings scored for Cowdenbeath against Hamilton Academical in a 2–1 defeat for the Fife outfit and then scored four goals in four consecutive games. He agreed to extend his loan until the end of February after the club asked Rangers and he also believed his loan spell at Cowdenbeath would earn him a first-team place back at Rangers. After two months at Cowdenbeath, Hemmings returned to Rangers after being recalled.

After being released by Rangers, Hemmings signed a one-year deal with Cowdenbeath and was given the number 21 shirt. On 27 April 2014, Hemmings was named as PFA Scotland Championship Player of the Year for 2013–14. He was also selected to the 2013–14 Championship PFA Scotland's Team of the Year. Hemmings scored 18 goals for Cowdenbeath, including the winning goal in the second leg of the relegation final against League One second-place team Dunfermline to help the club avoid relegation.

Following the season, he travelled to the United States for a trial with Orlando City. This came after Hemmings was linked with moves to Dundee, and Dunfermline Athletic.

=== Barnsley ===
On 19 June 2014, Hemmings signed a one-year contract with League One side Barnsley on a free transfer. The move was disputed, with Cowdenbeath demanding compensation, as Hemmings was under 23 at the time.

Having missed the first two matches due to an injury, Hemmings made his Barnsley debut on 19 August 2014, coming on as substitute for Sam Winnall in the last minutes, as Barnsley drew 2–2 with Coventry City. He scored his first Barnsley goal in the first round of the Football League Trophy, in a 2–0 win over York City on 2 September 2014. It took until 12 October 2014 for Hemmings to score his first Barnsley league goal, in a 3–1 win over Bradford City. Hemmings then scored his first FA Cup goal, in a replay, in a 3–0 win over Chester on 16 December 2014. His second league goal of the season came in a 1–0 win over Oldham Athletic on 3 February 2015, and his third on 14 February 2015 in a 5–1 loss against Crawley Town.

After one season at Barnsley, having made 29 appearances and scored five times in all competitions, Hemmings was among seven players released by the club.

=== Dundee ===
Hemmings signed a pre-contract agreement with Dundee on 16 May 2015 and joined the Scottish club on 1 July, on a three-year deal. Hemmings started the season very well at one point having scored 12 goals in 10 games, including a goal in a 2–1 victory over Dundee United in the Dundee derby, this form had the striker linked with a £2M move to Chinese side Beijing Renhe as well as being recommended for a call up to the Jamaica national team by former Jamaica manager John Barnes. He scored 21 league goals with an additional 4 goals to reach 25 goals in all competitions in his first season, and was named as SPFL Player of the Month for January 2016 as well as earning a nomination for PFA Player of the Year. Despite scoring 21 league goals Hemmings missed out on the SPFL player of the year and SPFL Golden Boot to Leigh Griffiths who had a remarkable season netting 40 goals for League Champions Celtic.

A release clause in Hemmings's contract saw him sold for far less than his valuation from the club who ideally valued the striker for a 7 figure sum. Hemmings was sold before the league season had started but still found form in the group stage of the Scottish League Cup, scoring 3 goals in 2 games.

=== Oxford United ===
On 27 July 2016, Hemmings signed for Oxford United for an undisclosed six-figure fee, believed to be in the region of £250,000. He agreed a three-year contract with his new club. After two substitute appearances in league and cup, he scored his first goal for the club on his full debut, the only Oxford goal in a 2–1 defeat by Bristol Rovers in a League One fixture.

On 22 August 2017 he joined Mansfield Town on a season-long loan.

At the end of the season Oxford announced Hemmings' transfer to Notts County for an undisclosed fee.

=== Notts County ===
On 1 June 2018, Hemmings signed for Notts County on a three-year contract for a fee of approximately £100,000 (two years with the club having the option for a third term). Whilst having success on the scoring sheet in his one season with the Magpies, the club would find themselves relegated out of the Football League and in a very poor financial position. Due to this financial situation, County decided to take offers from others on Hemmings, despite being only one year into his contract.

=== Return to Dundee ===
On 8 August 2019, Hemmings made his return to Dundee on a free transfer, signing a three-year deal with his former club. In a season that finished early due to the COVID-19 pandemic, Hemmings was top scorer for the Dark Blues, netting 10 goals in all competitions. After the club began negotiations to cut player wages in response to the financial hardships posed by COVID-19, Hemmings was the only player to not agree before 12 July. Hemmings reportedly agreed a wage cut, but eventually reneged and departed the club by mutual consent on 5 August 2020.

=== Burton Albion ===
On 12 August 2020, Hemmings signed for Burton Albion, on a two-year deal, following his departure from Dundee.

=== Tranmere Rovers ===
On 13 January 2022, Hemmings joined EFL League Two side Tranmere Rovers on a two-and-a-half-year deal, for an undisclosed fee. After captaining the club in the 2022–23 season, Hemmings departed Tranmere by mutual consent on 1 September 2023.

=== Stevenage ===
On 2 September 2023, Hemmings joined EFL League One club Stevenage on a permanent deal. Hemmings scored his first goal for the Boro on 28 October, in a league win over Derby County. At the end of May 2024, Hemmings thanked the club and announced he would leave upon the expiry of his contract.

=== Crewe Alexandra ===
On 21 June 2024, Hemmings joined EFL League Two club Crewe Alexandra on a 12-month contract, with an option for a further year. He made his debut in the league opener away to Barrow. Hemmings scored his first goal for the Railwaymen on 7 September, scoring the only goal of the game, a penalty, in a league win over Morecambe. Hemmings netted a brace two weeks later in a comfortable home win over Harrogate Town. Hemmings then suffered a foot injury that ruled him out until early 2025, On 25 January 2025, Hemmings returned to action for Crewe as a substitute against Accrington Stanley. but then suffered a calf injury which kept him out until early March. On 14 May 2025, the club announced he would be leaving in June when his contract expired.

=== Barrow ===
On 24 July 2025, Hemmings was signed by EFL League Two club Barrow on a one-year deal after playing on trial with the club during preseason. After making 16 appearances for the club, Hemmings departed at the end of the season.

=== Altrincham ===
On 28 August 2026, Hemmings joined National League club Altrincham, and made his debut the same day as a substitute in a home league win over Halifax Town.

== Personal life ==
Hemmings is the son of former professional footballer Tony Hemmings.

In The Guardian in February 2021, Hemmings detailed his struggles with mental health and anxiety throughout his career, including thoughts of suicide. He expressed the benefit of seeking help had done for him, and encouraged others going through similar struggles to get help.

In 2022, Kane became the patron of Wirral-based suicide prevention charity, The Martin Gallier Project.

== Career statistics ==
As of match played 31 August 2026

Appearances and goals by club, season and competition
Club	Season	League			National Cup		League Cup		Europe		Other		Total	
Club	Season	Division	Apps	Goals	Apps	Goals	Apps	Goals	Apps	Goals	Apps	Goals	Apps	Goals
Rangers	2010–11	Scottish Premier League	0	0	0	0	0	0	0	0	—		0	0
Rangers	2011–12	Scottish Premier League	4	0	0	0	0	0	1 (Note: Appearance in UEFA Champions League)	0	—		5	0
Rangers	2012–13	Scottish Third Division	5	1	0	0	0	0	—		0	0	5	1
Rangers	Total		9	1	0	0	0	0	1	0	0	0	10	1
Cowdenbeath (loan)	2012–13	Scottish First Division	7	4	0	0	0	0	—		—		7	4
Cowdenbeath	2013–14	Scottish Championship	31	18	1	0	2	4	—		5 (Note: Four appearances and two goals in Scottish Championship play-offs, one appearance in Scottish Challenge Cup)	2	39	24
Barnsley	2014–15	League One	23	3	3	1	0	0	—		2 (Note: Appearances in EFL Trophy)	1	28	5
Dundee	2015–16	Scottish Premiership	37	21	4	3	1	1	—		—		42	25
Dundee	2016–17	Scottish Premiership	0	0	0	0	2	3	—		—		2	3
Dundee	Total		37	21	4	3	3	4	0	0	0	0	44	28
Oxford United	2016–17	League One	40	6	6	5	2	0	—		6	4	54	15
Mansfield Town (loan)	2017–18	League Two	37	15	2	0	0	0	—		1	0	40	15
Notts County	2018–19	League Two	36	14	0	0	0	0	—		1	0	37	14
Notts County	2019–20	National League	2	0	0	0	0	0	—		0	0	2	0
Notts County	Total		38	14	0		0	0	0	0	1	0	39	14
Dundee	2019–20	Scottish Championship	25	10	1	0	0	0	—		1 (Note: Appearance in the Scottish Challenge Cup)	0	27	10
Burton Albion	2020–21	League One	36	15	1	0	2	0	—		3	0	42	15
Burton Albion	2021–22	League One	18	4	2	0	0	0	—		1	1	21	5
Burton Albion	Total		54	19	3	0	2	0	0	0	4	0	63	20
Tranmere Rovers	2021–22	League Two	22	8	0	0	0	0	—		0	0	22	8
Tranmere Rovers	2022–23	League Two	39	8	1	0	2	0	—		2	0	44	8
Tranmere Rovers	2023–24	League Two	1	0	0	0	2	0	—		0	0	3	0
Tranmere Rovers	Total		62	16	1	0	4	0	0	0	2	0	69	16
Stevenage	2023–24	League One	34	5	3	2	—		—		3	0	40	7
Crewe Alexandra	2024–25	League Two	20	4	0	0	1	0	—		0	0	21	4
Barrow	2025–26	League Two	14	0	1	1	0	0	—		1	0	16	1
Altrincham	2026–27	National League	2	0	0	0	—		—		0	0	2	0
Career total			433	136	25	12	14	8	1	0	26	8	499	164

== Honours ==
Oxford United

- EFL Trophy runner-up: 2016–17
