= Lee O'Connor (footballer) =

Irish footballer

Personal information
- Full name: Lee Patrick O'Connor
- Date of birth: 28 July 2000 (age 26)
- Place of birth: Waterford City, Ireland
- Height: 1.76 m (5 ft 9 in)
- Position: Defender

Team information
- Current team: Tranmere Rovers
- Number: 22

Youth career
- –2016: Villa
- 2016–2019: Manchester United

Senior career*
Years	Team	Apps	(Gls)
2019–2022	Celtic	0	(0)
2020	→ Partick Thistle (loan)	4	(0)
2020–2022	→ Tranmere Rovers (loan)	49	(0)
2022–	Tranmere Rovers	145	(0)

International career^{‡}
2015–2017	Republic of Ireland U17	14	(0)
2017–2019	Republic of Ireland U19	13	(2)
2019–2022	Republic of Ireland U21	26	(1)
2019	Republic of Ireland	1	(0)
- * Club domestic league appearances and goals as of 02:35, 27 January 2026 (UTC) ‡ National team caps and goals as of 23:50, 27 September 2022 (UTC)

Lee Patrick O'Connor (born 28 July 2000) is an Irish professional footballer who plays as a defender for EFL League Two club Tranmere Rovers and the Republic of Ireland national team. He has also spent time on loan at Partick Thistle.

== Club career ==
=== Early career ===
In 2016, O'Connor moved from Villa of Waterford to the Manchester United youth team, signing a three-year contract. On 6 August 2019, O'Connor played an EFL Trophy match for Manchester United U21s away to Rotherham United, winning 2–0 at the New York Stadium.

=== Celtic ===
In September 2019, O'Connor joined Celtic, signing a four-year contract until 2023.

==== Partick Thistle loan ====
In January 2020, O'Connor joined Scottish Championship club Partick Thistle on loan, joining Ian McCall's side for the second half of the season. He made his debut in senior club football on 25 January 2020, in a 2–1 loss to Arbroath. He made five appearances in all competitions for the club before the season was ended prematurely due to the COVID-19 pandemic.

==== Tranmere Rovers ====
O'Connor joined League Two club Tranmere Rovers on 17 August 2020 on a season-long loan. He made 42 appearances over the course of the season and returned to Celtic for pre-season. O'Connor returned to Tranmere Rovers on another season long loan on transfer deadline day, 31 August 2021. The transfer was made permanent in January 2022.

== International career ==
O'Connor made his international debut, and recorded an assist, for the Republic of Ireland on 14 November 2019 in a friendly match against New Zealand. O'Connor was announced as the FAI Under-21 International Player of the Year for 2019 on 4 August 2020. O'Connor holds the record number of underage appearances for the Republic of Ireland with 78 appearances across all underage teams.

== Career statistics ==
=== Club ===
As of match played 28 October 2025

Appearances and goals by club, season and competition
Club	Season	League			National cup (Note: Includes Scottish Cup and FA Cup)		League cup (Note: Includes Scottish League Cup and EFL Cup)		Continental		Other		Total	
Club	Season	Division	Apps	Goals	Apps	Goals	Apps	Goals	Apps	Goals	Apps	Goals	Apps	Goals
Manchester United U21	2019–20	—			—		—		—		1 (Note: Appearance(s) in EFL Trophy)	0	1	0
Celtic	2019–20	Scottish Premiership	0	0	0	0	0	0	0	0	—		0	0
Celtic	2020-21	Scottish Premiership	0	0	0	0	0	0	0	0	—		0	0
Celtic	2021-22	Scottish Premiership	0	0	0	0	0	0	0	0	—		0	0
Celtic	Total		0	0	0	0	0	0	0	0	—		0	0
Partick Thistle (loan)	2019–20	Scottish Championship	4	0	0	0	—		—		1 (Note: Appearance(s) in Scottish Challenge Cup)	0	5	0
Tranmere Rovers (loan)	2020–21	League Two	33	0	2	0	1	0	—		6 (Note: Four appearances in EFL Trophy; Two appearances in League Two play-offs)	0	42	0
Celtic B	2021–22	—			—		—		—		1	1	1	1
Tranmere Rovers (loan)	2021–22	League Two	13	0	2	0	0	0	—		2	0	17	0
Tranmere Rovers	2021–22	League Two	18	0	—		—		—		—		18	0
Tranmere Rovers	2022–23	League Two	39	0	1	0	2	0	—		3	0	45	0
Tranmere Rovers	2023–24	League Two	40	0	1	0	0	0	—		0	0	41	0
Tranmere Rovers	2024–25	League Two	42	0	0	0	2	0	—		3	0	47	0
Tranmere Rovers	2025–26	League Two	7	0	0	0	1	0	—		0	0	8	0
Tranmere Rovers	Total		146	0	2	0	5	0	—		6	0	159	0
Career total			196	0	6	0	6	0	0	0	17	1	225	1

=== International ===
Appearances and goals by national team and year
National team	Year	Apps	Goals
Republic of Ireland	2019	1	0
Total		1	0

== Honours ==
Individual

- FAI Under-15 International Player of the Year: 2015
- FAI Under-19 International Player of the Year: 2018
- FAI Under-21 International Player of the Year: 2019
