= George Nugent (footballer) =

English footballer

Personal information
- Full name: George Thomas Nugent
- Date of birth: 4 December 2001 (age 24)
- Place of birth: Birkenhead, England
- Position: Midfielder

Youth career
- Tranmere Rovers

Senior career*
Years	Team	Apps	(Gls)
2020–2021	Tranmere Rovers	0	(0)
2021–2022	Witton Albion	12	(1)
2021–2022	→ Prescot Cables (loan)	17	(0)
2022–2023	Prescot Cables	11	(0)
2023	Trafford	5	(0)
2023–2025	Vauxhall Motors	45	(0)
2025	Colwyn Bay	8	(0)
- * Club domestic league appearances and goals as of 19:51, 12 April 2025 (UTC)

George Thomas Nugent (born 4 December 2001) is an English professional footballer who plays as a winger. He previously played for Tranmere Rovers.

== Club career ==
=== Tranmere Rovers ===
Nugent progressed through the youth structure at Tranmere Rovers and made his first team debut for in a 2–1 defeat to Leicester City F.C. Under-21s in the 2019–20 EFL Trophy, and signed his first professional contract in July 2020. He was released by the club at the end of the season.

=== Non-League ===
After his release he joined Witton Albion in July 2021.

In November he joined Prescot Cables on loan.

In January 2025, Nugent joined Cymru North club Colwyn Bay. He departed from the club at the end of the season.

== Personal life ==
Nugent's brother, Ollie, is also a footballer, and represented Great Britain at the 2016 Summer Paralympics.

== Career statistics ==
As of match played 10 December 2024

Appearances and goals by club, season and competition
Club	Season	League			FA Cup		League Cup		Other		Total	
Club	Season	Division	Apps	Goals	Apps	Goals	Apps	Goals	Apps	Goals	Apps	Goals
Tranmere Rovers	2019–20	League One	0	0	0	0	0	0	1 (Note: Appearance(s) in the Football League Trophy)	0	1	0
Tranmere Rovers	2020–21	League Two	0	0	0	0	0	0	1	0	1	0
Tranmere Rovers	Total		0	0	0	0	0	0	2	0	2	0
Witton Albion	2021–22	NPL Premier Division	12	1	1	0	0	0	1 (Note: Appearance(s) in the Cheshire Senior Cup)	0	14	1
Prescot Cables (loan)	2021–22	NPL Division One West	17	0	—		0	0	0	0	17	0
Prescot Cables	2022–23	NPL Division One West	11	0	4	0	0	0	0	0	15	0
Prescot Cables	Total		28	0	4	0	0	0	0	0	32	0
Trafford	2022–23	NPL Division One West	5	0	—		0	0	0	0	5	0
Vauxhall Motors	2023–24	NPL Division One West	33	0	0	0	0	0	1	0	34	0
Vauxhall Motors	2024–25	NPL Division One West	12	0	1	0	—		3 (Note: One appearance in FA Trophy, two appearances in Cheshire Senior Cup)	0	16	0
Vauxhall Motors	Total		45	0	1	0	0	0	4	0	50	0
Career total			80	1	6	0	0	0	7	0	103	1
