= Elliott Nevitt =

English footballer

Personal information
- Full name: Elliott Lloyd Nevitt
- Date of birth: 30 October 1996 (age 30)
- Place of birth: Liverpool, England
- Height: 1.83 m (6 ft 0 in)
- Position: Striker

Team information
- Current team: Oldham Athletic
- Number: 20

Senior career*
Years	Team	Apps	(Gls)
- Everton Xaverians
2016–2017	Burscough		
2017–2018	City of Liverpool		
2018	AFC Liverpool		
2018	Bootle		
- Waterloo Dock
2019–2020	City of Liverpool	31	(12)
2020–2021	Warrington Rylands 1906		
2021–2023	Tranmere Rovers	62	(11)
2023–2024	Crewe Alexandra	64	(16)
2024–2026	Gillingham	58	(6)
2026	→ Cambridge United (loan)	16	(0)
2026–	Oldham Athletic	10	(1)
- * Club domestic league appearances and goals as of 14:23, 22 November 2026 (UTC)

Elliott Lloyd Nevitt (born 30 October 1996) is an English professional footballer who plays as a striker for EFL League Two club Oldham Athletic.

== Career ==
=== Non-league and Sunday league ===
Nevitt spent five years in non-league football, before which he attended college. He played non-league football for Everton Xaverians, Burscough, City of Liverpool (two spells), AFC Liverpool, Bootle and Waterloo Dock. He joined Warrington Rylands 1906 in October 2020 from City of Liverpool, and scored a hat-trick for the club in the 2021 FA Vase Final at Wembley Stadium.

In addition to playing semi-professional non-league football, he regularly played Sunday league football and has twice appeared in the final of the country's premier Sunday cup competition, the FA Sunday Cup for Campfield FC, a Liverpool club. In the 2014–15 final played at Ewood Park, he appeared as a second-half substitute as the club beat OJM. He also appeared in the final of the 2019–20 competition, delayed due to the COVID-19 pandemic, where he scored the winning goal at St George's Park National Football Centre in extra time as the club beat Luton-based St Joseph's.

=== Tranmere Rovers ===
Nevitt turned professional by signing a one-year contract with League Two club Tranmere Rovers in July 2021.

He made his professional debut on 10 August, scoring the second goal in a 2–2 draw with Oldham Athletic in the first round of the EFL Cup. In October 2022, he scored three goals in two games for Tranmere against Crewe Alexandra: on 14 October, he came off the bench and scored two second-half goals in Rovers' 3–0 league win at Prenton Park; on 18 October he scored the only goal in Rovers' 1–0 EFL Trophy win at Gresty Road. In November, he signed a contract extension with Tranmere until 2023.

=== Crewe Alexandra ===
Having impressed Crewe manager Lee Bell in his performances against the club, Nevitt signed for Crewe for an undisclosed fee on 11 January 2023. He made his debut in a 1–1 draw at Mansfield Town on 14 January 2023, but failed to score in the 21 games of his first season. Finally, after 26 appearances, he scored his first Crewe goal in a 4–2 victory against Newport County at Gresty Road on 15 August 2023, and went on to become Crewe's top scorer, with 18 goals in 48 games (his 16 league goals included four in the 90th minute or later), during the regular 2023–24 season, helping the club reach the League Two play-off final. Before his second Wembley final (which Crewe lost), Nevitt highlighted the importance of Crewe's fans: "Last year was tough and the fans stuck with me. This year, just to repay them with 18 goals is massive. Some of the last-minute winners and equalisers are probably some of my favourite times."

=== Gillingham ===
In May 2024, Nevitt agreed to join Gillingham having rejected the offer of a new contract with Crewe Alexandra.

On 23 January 2026, Nevitt joined fellow League Two side Cambridge United on loan for the remainder of the season.

He was released by Gillingham at the end of the 2025–26 season.

=== Oldham Athletic ===
In May 2026 it was announced that Nevitt would sign for Oldham Athletic on 1 July 2026.

== Career statistics ==
As of match played 21 November 2026

Appearances and goals by club, season and competition
Club	Season	League			FA Cup		League Cup		Other		Total	
Club	Season	Division	Apps	Goals	Apps	Goals	Apps	Goals	Apps	Goals	Apps	Goals
City of Liverpool	2019–20	Northern Premier League	26	10	2	0	0	0	4 (Note: Two appearances and one goal in the FA Trophy; two appearances and one goal in the Liverpool FA Senior Cup.)	2	32	12
City of Liverpool	2020–21	Northern Premier League	5	2	2	1	0	0	0	0	7	3
City of Liverpool	Total		31	12	4	1	0	0	4	2	39	15
Tranmere Rovers	2021–22	League Two	40	7	2	0	1	1	2 (Note: Appearance(s) in the EFL Trophy.)	0	45	8
Tranmere Rovers	2022–23	League Two	22	4	1	0	1	1	4	1	28	6
Tranmere Rovers	Total		62	11	3	0	2	2	6	1	73	14
Crewe Alexandra	2022–23	League Two	21	0	0	0	0	0	0	0	21	0
Crewe Alexandra	2023–24	League Two	43	16	2	2	2	0	4 (Note: One appearance in the EFL Trophy, three appearances in the League Two play-offs)	0	51	18
Crewe Alexandra	Total		64	16	2	2	2	0	4	0	72	18
Gillingham	2024–25	League Two	36	4	0	0	0	0	1	1	37	5
Gillingham	2025–26	League Two	22	2	1	1	1	0	0	0	24	3
Gillingham	Total		58	6	1	1	1	0	1	1	61	8
Cambridge United (loan)	2025–26	League Two	16	0	0	0	0	0	0	0	16	0
Oldham Athletic	2026–27	League Two	10	1	1	0	1	0	1	0	13	1
Career total			241	46	11	5	6	2	16	4	274	56

== Honours ==
Warrington Rylands 1906

- FA Vase: 2020–21

Individual

- EFL League Two – Goal of the Month: January 2022
- Tranmere Rovers Player of the Season: 2021–22
