= 2023 National League play-off final =

- The match took place at Wembley Stadium.
- Event: 2022–23 National League
Notts County	Chesterfield
2	2
- Notts County won 4–3 on penalties
- Date: 13 May 2023
- Venue: Wembley Stadium, London
- Referee: Matthew Corlett
- Attendance: 38,138

The 2023 National League play-off final (known as the Vanarama National League Promotion Final for sponsorship reasons) was an association football match played on 13 May 2023 at Wembley Stadium, London, between Notts County and Chesterfield. The match determined the second and final team to gain promotion from the National League, the fifth tier of English football, to EFL League Two for the 2023–24 season. The champions of the 2022–23 National League season gained automatic promotion to League Two, while the teams placed from second to seventh took part in the play-offs; Notts County finished in second place while Chesterfield ended the season in third. Boreham Wood and Bromley were the losing semi-finalists, while Barnet and Woking had lost at the quarter-final stage.

The match was played in front of over 38,000 spectators and was refereed by Matthew Corlett. Andrew Dallas gave Chesterfield a 1–0 lead with a fifth minute penalty, and this remained the score until the 87th minute, when John Bostock equalised for Notts County with a free kick. Chesterfield went 2–1 ahead early the first half of extra time through Armando Dobra, but Notts County would level again in the second half, this time through Rúben Rodrigues, and the match finished 2–2. A penalty shootout was therefore required to determine the winner. Goalkeeper Archie Mair, brought on as a substitute specifically for the shootout, saved two of Chesterfield's penalties, and Notts County won 4–3 to gain promotion.

In Notts County's following season, their first back in the English Football League since 2019, they finished 14th in League Two. Chesterfield ended the 2023–24 National League season by winning promotion as champions, so joining Notts County in the 2024–25 EFL League Two season.

== Route to the final ==
National League final table, leading positions
Pos	Team	Pld	W	D	L	GF	GA	GD	Pts
1	Wrexham	46	34	9	3	116	43	+73	111
2	Notts County	46	32	11	3	117	42	+75	107
3	Chesterfield	46	25	9	12	85	52	+33	84
4	Woking	46	24	10	12	71	48	+23	82
5	Barnet	46	21	11	14	75	67	+8	74
6	Boreham Wood	46	19	15	12	52	40	+12	72
7	Bromley	46	18	17	11	68	53	+15	71

Notts County (nicknamed the Magpies) finished the season in second place in the National League, the fifth tier of the English football league system, one place ahead of Chesterfield (nicknamed the Spireites). Both therefore missed out on the only automatic place for promotion to EFL League Two and instead took part in the play-offs to determine the second promoted team. Notts County had finished the season with 107 points, but nevertheless finished four points behind the league champions Wrexham, their points tally setting a record for a team finishing second. Meanwhile, Chesterfield had finished 23 points behind the Magpies.

Under the National League's play-off format, Notts County and Chesterfield both qualified directly for the semi-final stage as the second and third-place teams. Notts County played sixth-place Boreham Wood at Meadow Lane, Nottingham, after the latter had defeated Barnet 2–1 in the quarter finals. Boreham Wood took the lead in the 37th minute, with Femi Ilesanmi scoring from close range. Lee Ndlouv made it 2–0 shortly before half time, when he caught Notts in possession and found himself one-on-one with goalkeeper Sam Slocombe. Aden Baldwin pulled a goal back early in the second half, but Notts then missed a chance to draw level when Rúben Rodrigues had his penalty saved by Boreham Wood's goalkeeper Joe McDonnell. In the sixth minute of injury time, Baldwin headed a second goal, and normal time finished 2–2. The scores remained level until the 120th minute, when Jodi Jones's shot from the edge of the penalty area found its way past McDonnell, and Notts County won 3–2. Reflecting on his winning goal, Jones said: "I was just so excited I didn't know what to do. I saw all the bench coming towards me, the gaffer trying to chase me but he couldn't keep up."

In the other semi-final, Chesterfield played Bromley at the Technique Stadium, Chesterfield, following Bromley's 2–1 quarter final win over Woking. The first half was held up following a medical emergency in the crowd, and Bromley took a 1–0 lead in the eighth of eleven subsequent minutes of stoppage time. The Spireites equalised in the 57th minute, when Bromley's Deji Elerewe turned the ball into his own net. Elerewe was sent off in the 75th minute, and Darren Oldaker put Chesterfield 2–1 through a deflected free kick shortly afterwards. The second half saw another lengthy stoppage, this time as a result of a drone flying above the stadium, and the subsequent nine minutes of injury time was enough for Michael Cheek to make it 2–2. Thirteen minutes into extra time, with ten-man Bromley visibly tiring, Liam Mandeville drove home a winning goal, and the Spireites won 3–2.

=== Quarter-finals ===
2 May 2023	Barnet	1–2	Boreham Wood	The Hive, Canons Park
19:45	Pritchard 52'	Report	Ndlovu 19', 45'	Attendance: 3,733; Referee: Daniel Middleton

3 May 2023	Woking	1–2	Bromley	Kingfield, Woking
19:45	Ince 13'	Report	Cheek 60 ' (pen.); Elerewe 77'	Attendance: 5,033; Referee: Lewis Smith

=== Semi-finals ===
7 May 2023	Notts County	3–2 (a.e.t.)	Boreham Wood	Meadow Lane, Nottingham
12:30	Baldwin 47', 90+6'; Jones 120'	Report	Ilesanmi 37'; Ndlovu 45+2'	Attendance: 15,617; Referee: Scott Tallis

7 May 2023	Chesterfield	3–2 (a.e.t.)	Bromley	Technique Stadium, Chesterfield
15:30	Elerewe 57 ' (og); Oldaker 79'; Mandeville 102'	Report	Marriott 45+8'; Cheek 90+9'	Attendance: 9,657; Referee: Scott Simpson

== Match ==
=== Background ===
Notts County, managed by Luke Williams, were involved in a high-profile championship race with Wrexham for most of the regular season. Ahead of their game on 10 April 2023 at the Racecourse Ground, Wrexham, both had accumulated 100 points and were 25 points clear of third place. Characterised as the biggest match in National League history, Wrexham won 3–2, with their goalkeeper Ben Foster saving an injury time penalty from Cedwyn Scott to secure the win. They won the title twelve days later. Notts County had previously played in one National League play-off final, losing 3–1 to Harrogate Town in 2020. The Magpies were aiming to return to the English Football League for the first time since their relegation in 2019. Notts had qualified for the play-offs in all three of their previous National League seasons: in addition to their final defeat in 2020, they had lost 4–2 in extra time to Torquay United in the 2021 semi-final, and 2–1 in extra time to Grimsby Town in the 2022 quarter final.

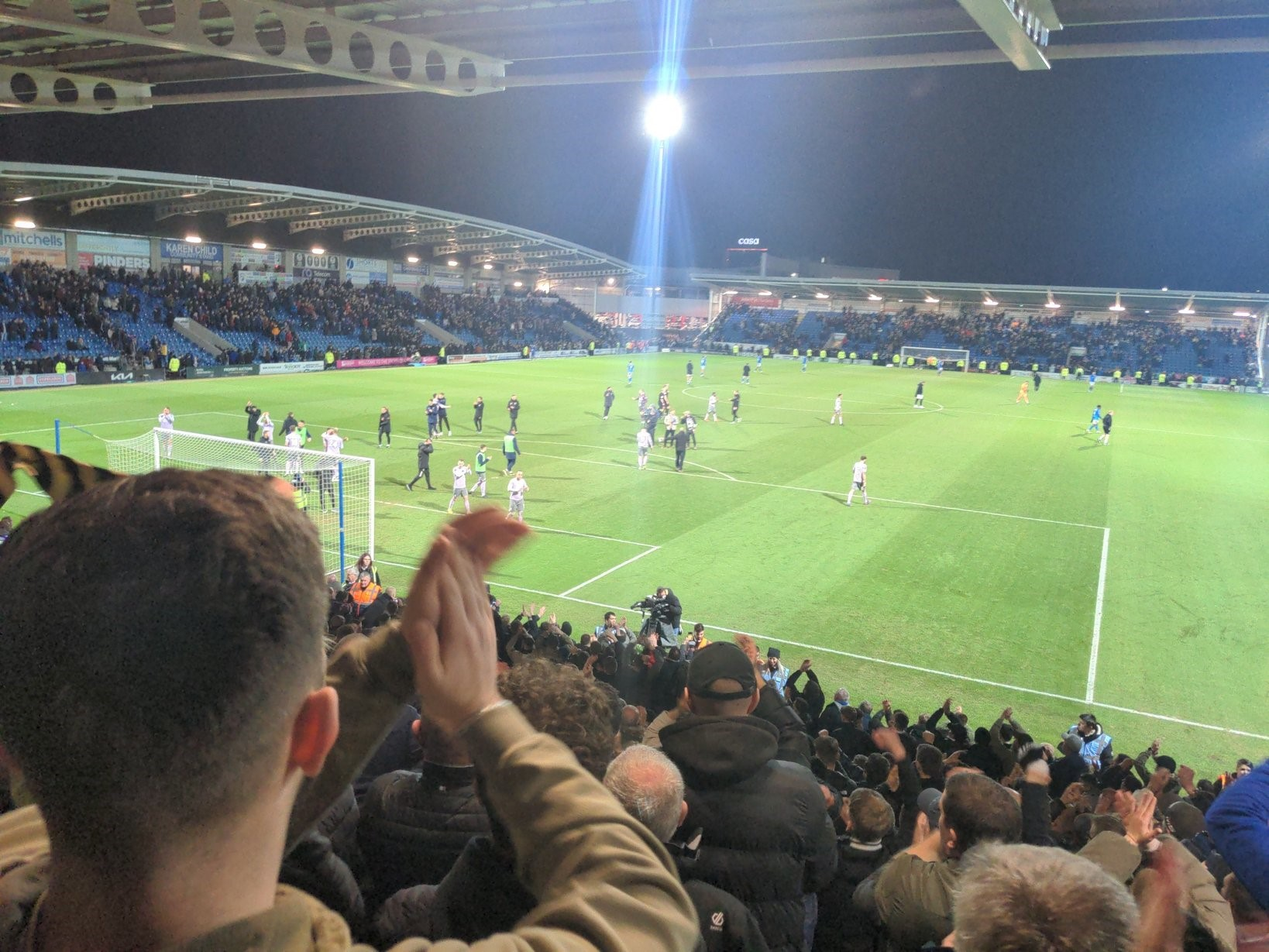
Notts County players applaud their supporters following their win at Chesterfield in February 2023.

Chesterfield, managed by Paul Cook, were the only team other than Wrexham and Notts County to top the National League table during the season, doing so in the opening weeks. At one point, the Spireites had experienced a nine match winless run, but they secured third place on the final day of the season following a 4–0 win over Maidstone United. Relegated to the National League in 2018, Chesterfield had made two previous appearances in the National League play-offs. In 2021, they were beaten 3–2 by Notts County in the play-off quarter finals. The following year, they were beaten 3–1 by Solihull Moors in the semi-finals.

Chesterfield and Notts County had played twice during the 2022–23 regular season. In the first game, played at Meadow Lane on 20 August 2022, the Spireites led 2–0 through goals from Liam Mandeville and Akwasi Asante, but Macaulay Langstaff scored two goals in three minutes to draw the Magpies level, and the match finished 2–2. Langstaff scored again when the two clubs met at the Technique Stadium on 11 February 2023, putting Notts County 1–0 up. Armando Dobra equalised for Chesterfield shortly before half time, but the Spireites were reduced to ten men in the second half when Jeff King was issued a second yellow card. Notts County took advantage of their extra man, and Adam Chicksen’s 71st-minute goal secured the Magpies a 2–1 win.

Luke Williams picked the same eleven players in his starting eleven as in the semi-final. There had been worries about the fitness of Chesterfield players Ryan Colclough and Jamie Grimes, but Paul Cook ultimately also named an unchanged team. Matthew Corlett was appointed referee for the match. Incidentally, Corlett has also been in charge of the teams’ league match in February.

=== Summary ===
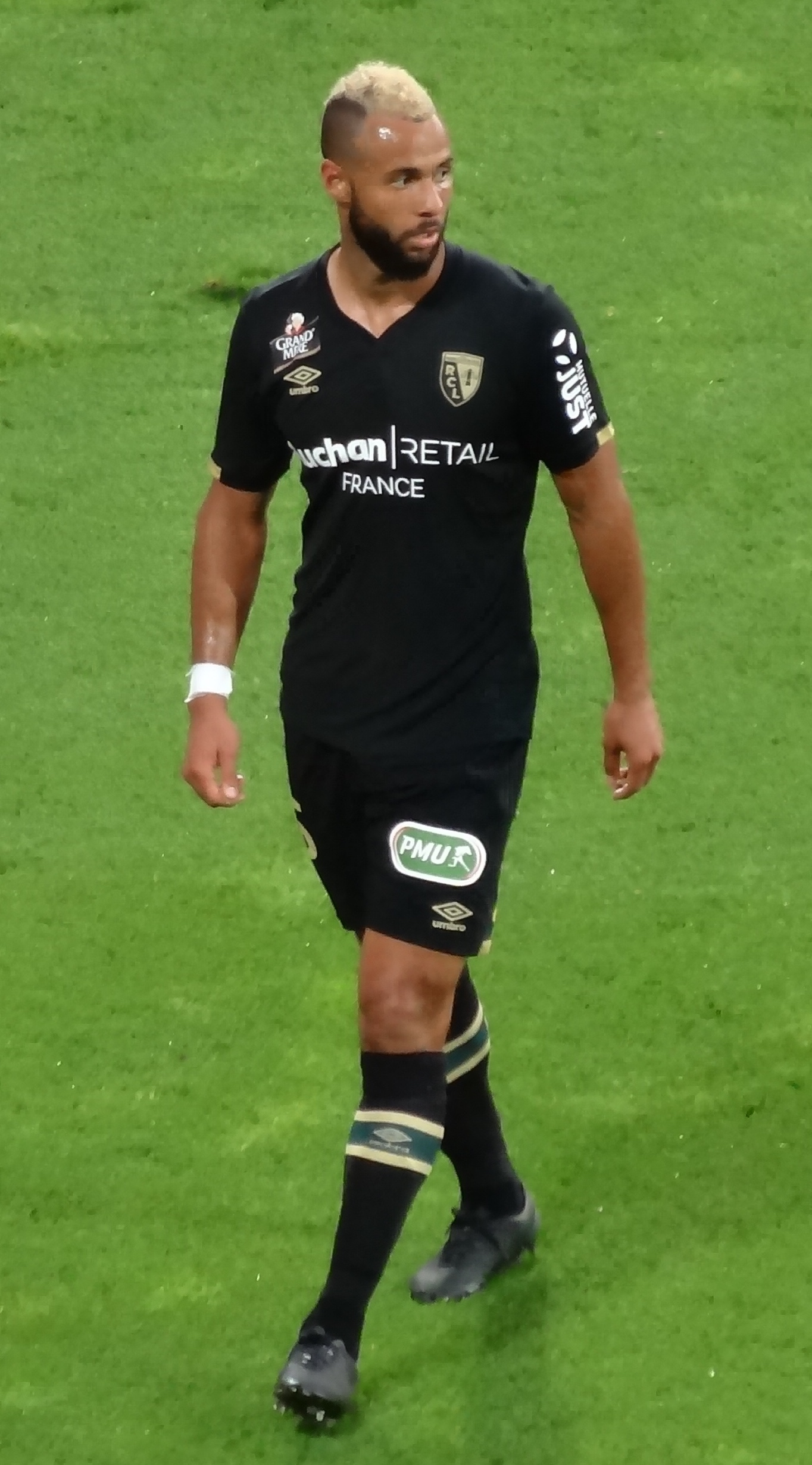
John Bostock, pictured here in 2016, scored Notts County's first equaliser. He also missed his penalty kick in the shootout attempting a Panenka.

Chesterfield kicked the match off at around 3.30pm on 13 May 2023. With less than two minutes played, Notts County goalkeeper Sam Slocombe gave away an indirect free kick in his own penalty area for taking two touches of the ball following a goal kick. Slocombe blocked Jeff King's subsequent attempt on goal, but the Notts goalkeeper gave away a penalty shortly afterwards for a foul on Andrew Dallas. Dallas scored to put the Spireites 1–0 up in the fifth minute. Chesterfield broke Notts County's high line a number of times during the first half but could not add to their lead, and it remained 1–0 at half time.

Early in the second half, Notts County's Sam Austin saw a chance from the edge of the area go well over the bar, while Connell Rawlinson also missed a chance to equalise when his header went narrowly wide. Liam Mandeville had a late opportunity to put Chesterfield 2–0 up but was unable to capitalise on a poor clearance from Slocombe. The match remained 1–0 until the 87th minute. Awarded a free kick, Notts County's John Bostock caught Chesterfield's goalkeeper Ross Fitzsimons out of position and equalised for the Magpies at the near post. In post-match interviews, it was revealed that Notts County's goalkeeping coach had noticed Fitzsimons’ tendency to leave gaps when defending free kicks and impressed this upon the players.

With no further scoring in normal time, the game went to extra time. Chesterfield regained the lead early in extra time through Armando Dobra, who had time and space to place a shot past Slocombe. Macaulay Langstaff and Rawlinson both had chances to equalise again for the Magpies, but the score remained 2–1 to the Spireites at the end of the first half of extra time. Early in the second half, Notts County made it 2–2, with Rúben Rodrigues finding the back of the net with a bouncing volley. There was no further scoring in extra time, though Notts County did make an important substitution in preparation for the penalty shootout. Luke Williams opted to take off Sam Slomcombe, who had never saved a penalty since joining Notts County, and replace him with on-loan Norwich City goalkeeper Archie Mair, who had saved a spot kick against Altrincham earlier in the season.

Ollie Banks scored the opening penalty for Chesterfield, and Macaulay Langstaff responded for Notts County. Archie Mair then saved Chesterfield's second attempt from Darren Oldaker, before Rúben Rodrigues put Notts County 2–1 up. Laurence Maguire and Jodi Jones both scored with their teams’ third attempts, before Mair made a full-length save to deny Jeff King with Chesterfield's fourth attempt. John Bostock then had the opportunity to win the game for Notts County, but his attempted panenka hit the crossbar and Joe Quigley scored Chesterfield's fifth and final attempt. It was left to Notts County's Cedwyn Scott, who had seen his penalty saved at Wrexham weeks earlier, to score the promotion-winning penalty kick for the Magpies.

=== Details ===
13 May 2023
15:30 BST

Notts County	2–2 (a.e.t.)	Chesterfield
Bostock 87'; Rodrigues 108'	Report	Dallas 5' (pen.); Dobra 93'
Penalties
Langstaff (penalty scored); Rodrigues (penalty scored); Jones (penalty scored); Bostock (penalty missed); Scott (penalty scored)	4–3	(penalty scored) Banks; (penalty missed) Oldaker; (penalty scored) Maguire; (penalty missed) King; (penalty scored) Quigley

Wembley Stadium, London
Attendance: 38,138
Referee: Matthew Corlett

Notts County	Chesterfield F.C.

GK	1	(England) Sam Slocombe		(substituted off) 119'
DF	4	(Scotland) Kyle Cameron
DF	5	(Wales) Connell Rawlinson
DF	15	(England) Aden Baldwin		(substituted off) 118'
DF	23	(Zimbabwe) Adam Chicksen		(substituted off) 55'
MF	8	(England) Sam Austin		(substituted off) 66'
MF	11	(France) Aaron Nemane
MF	18	(England) Matt Palmer
MF	24	(England) John Bostock	Booked
FW	9	(England) Macaulay Langstaff
FW	20	(Portugal) Rúben Rodrigues
Substitutes:
GK	13	(Scotland) Archie Mair		(substituted on) 119'	Booked
DF	2	(England) Richard Brindley		(substituted on) 118'
MF	6	(Republic of Ireland) Jim O'Brien
MF	10	(Malta) Jodi Jones		(substituted on) 55'
FW	19	(England) Cedwyn Scott		(substituted on) 66'
Manager:
(England) Luke Williams

GK	1	(England) Ross Fitzsimons
DF	5	(England) Jamie Grimes	Booked
DF	20	(England) Jeff King
DF	21	(England) Ash Palmer
DF	33	(England) Bailey Clements
MF	7	(England) Liam Mandeville		(substituted off) 89'
MF	10	(England) Ryan Colclough		(substituted off) 70'
MF	17	(Albania) Armando Dobra		(substituted off) 105'
MF	26	(England) Darren Oldaker	Booked
MF	35	(England) Mike Jones
FW	29	(Scotland) Andrew Dallas		(substituted off) 78'
Substitutes:
DF	6	(England) Laurence Maguire		(substituted on) 105'
MF	4	(Nigeria) Tim Akinola		(substituted on) 89'
FW	15	(England) Paul McCallum
MF	28	(England) Ollie Banks		(substituted on) 70'
FW	27	(Republic of Ireland) Joe Quigley		(substituted on) 78'
Manager:
(England) Paul Cook

== Post match ==
With the win, Notts County returned to the English Football League, of which they had been a founding member in 1888. "In context it's enormous, it's a massive moment in the history of the club," manager Luke Williams said of their promotion, "We have shut the door on the worst times the club has experienced since its beginning." Williams paid tribute to his players, saying "I've learned that when these guys look like they are done, they are not – they have another roll of the dice."

Notts County's promotion was their first since securing the 2009–10 Football League Two championship. Nottingham City Council attracted criticism when it declined to stage a celebratory event for the Magpies in the city's Old Market Square citing pressure on its finances. The Council reversed its decision the following day, saying it was in talks with the club about staging an event before the start of the following season, although Notts ultimately declined the invitation. Council leader David Mellen apologised, saying the initial decision had “not been the council's finest hour.”

Chesterfield's defeat meant they would spend a sixth consecutive season in the National League. Manager Paul Cook said that he had “no regrets about the game, our lads gave everything they have got.” Cook also voiced his support for increasing the number of promotion and relegation places between the National League and EFL League Two, saying it was a “sporting disgrace” that only two promotion places (one automatic) were available and that Notts County, who had finished the season with 107 points, had set a record for most points while not gone up automatically.
