= 2022–23 Notts County F.C. season =

English football club season

Notts County F.C.
2022–23 season
- Chairman: Christoffer Reedtz
- Manager: Luke Williams
- National League: 2nd (promoted via play-offs)
- FA Cup: Fourth qualifying round
- FA Trophy: Fourth round
- Top goalscorer: League: Macaulay Langstaff (42); All: Macaulay Langstaff (42)
- Highest home attendance: 16,511 (v Yeovil Town, 19 November 2022)
- Lowest home attendance: 2,040 (v Chorley, 20 December 2022)
Home colours	Away colours

During the 2022–23 English football season, Notts County competed in the National League, the fifth tier of the English football league system; this was their fourth season at this level following their relegation from EFL League Two in 2019. The team was involved in an intense race with Wrexham for the league title and the solitary automatic promotion place, with the two clubs dominating the 2022–23 National League season, together surpassing previous divisional records for points, wins and goals scored. Though Notts earned 107 points over the campaign, Wrexham claimed the title by a four-point margin, requiring the former to enter a six-team play-off to determine the second promoted club. Here, the team overturned a 0–2 deficit to defeat Boreham Wood 3–2 in extra time in the semi-final. It then gained a place in the English Football League (EFL) by beating Chesterfield 4–3 on penalties in the 2023 National League play-off final following a 2–2 draw at Wembley Stadium. The team fared less well in cup competitions, losing to Coalville Town in the fourth qualifying round of the FA Cup and to Maidstone United on penalties in the fourth round of the FA Trophy.

Led by first-year head coach Luke Williams, Notts County played 51 competitive matches, winning 34, drawing 13, and losing four, and broke numerous club records. Macaulay Langstaff scored 42 goals during the campaign, setting new club and league records for the most goals scored by a player in a single season, while Matt Palmer made the most appearances, featuring in all 51 games. The necessity of a team with such a high points tally having to win promotion via the play-offs prompted discussion about increasing the number of promotion and relegation places between the National League and League Two, while the team's rivalry with Wrexham featured in season two of the television programme Welcome to Wrexham. The season was affected by the sudden death, on 30 March, of Jason Turner, the club's chief executive officer, at the age of 50.

== Background ==
A founding member of the English Football League (EFL) in 1888, Notts County (nicknamed the Magpies) were relegated to non-League football for the first time in 2019. (Note: The term non-League refers to football played below EFL League Two.) The 2022–23 season was the club's fourth consecutive season in the National League, the fifth tier of the English football league system, with each of their three previous campaigns ending in defeat in the play-offs. Under the management of Neal Ardley, Notts had finished third in the 2019–20 season, losing the 2020 National League play-off final 3–1 to Harrogate Town. Ardley was dismissed during the 2020–21 season and replaced as head coach by Ian Burchnall. The team finished fifth, and reached the semi-finals of the play-offs, losing 4–2 in extra time at Torquay United. In 2021–22, Burchnall's only full season in charge, Notts again finished fifth. Rúben Rodrigues gave the Magpies a 1–0 lead in their home play-off quarter-final against Grimsby Town at Meadow Lane, Nottingham. However, Grimsby found an equalising goal in the final moments of normal time, and won the match 2–1 late in extra time.

== Coach and player changes ==
=== Out ===
On 27 May, four days after the play-off defeat to Grimsby, Burchnall departed Notts to take the role of head coach at League One side Forest Green Rovers. His assistant Michael Doyle followed four days later. Several players also departed during the off-season: Dion Kelly-Evans, Alex Lacey and Tyreace Palmer were released, Kyle Wootton made a free transfer to Stockport County, and Lewis Knight and Callum Roberts were sold for undisclosed fees to Gateshead and Aberdeen respectively. The club also agreed to terminate the contract of forward Elisha Sam. There was one additional departure during the season, with Notts agreeing to terminate the contract of Joel Taylor on 13 March.

Several Notts players, who would make first-team appearances for the club during 2022–23, were also loaned to other clubs during the season. Frank Vincent was loaned to Aldershot Town in August, initially for one month, but then until January. In November, before his release, Taylor was loaned to Dagenham & Redbridge, originally for two months, and then for one month further. Before making his senior debut for the Magpies at Bromley in March, Tiernan Brooks spent time on loan at Hednesford Town and Boston United, while Kairo Mitchell was loaned to Eastleigh for the remainder of the season in February having found his playing time at Notts increasingly limited. Ed Francis was the final player to be loaned out, moving to Gateshead until the end of the season in March.

=== In ===
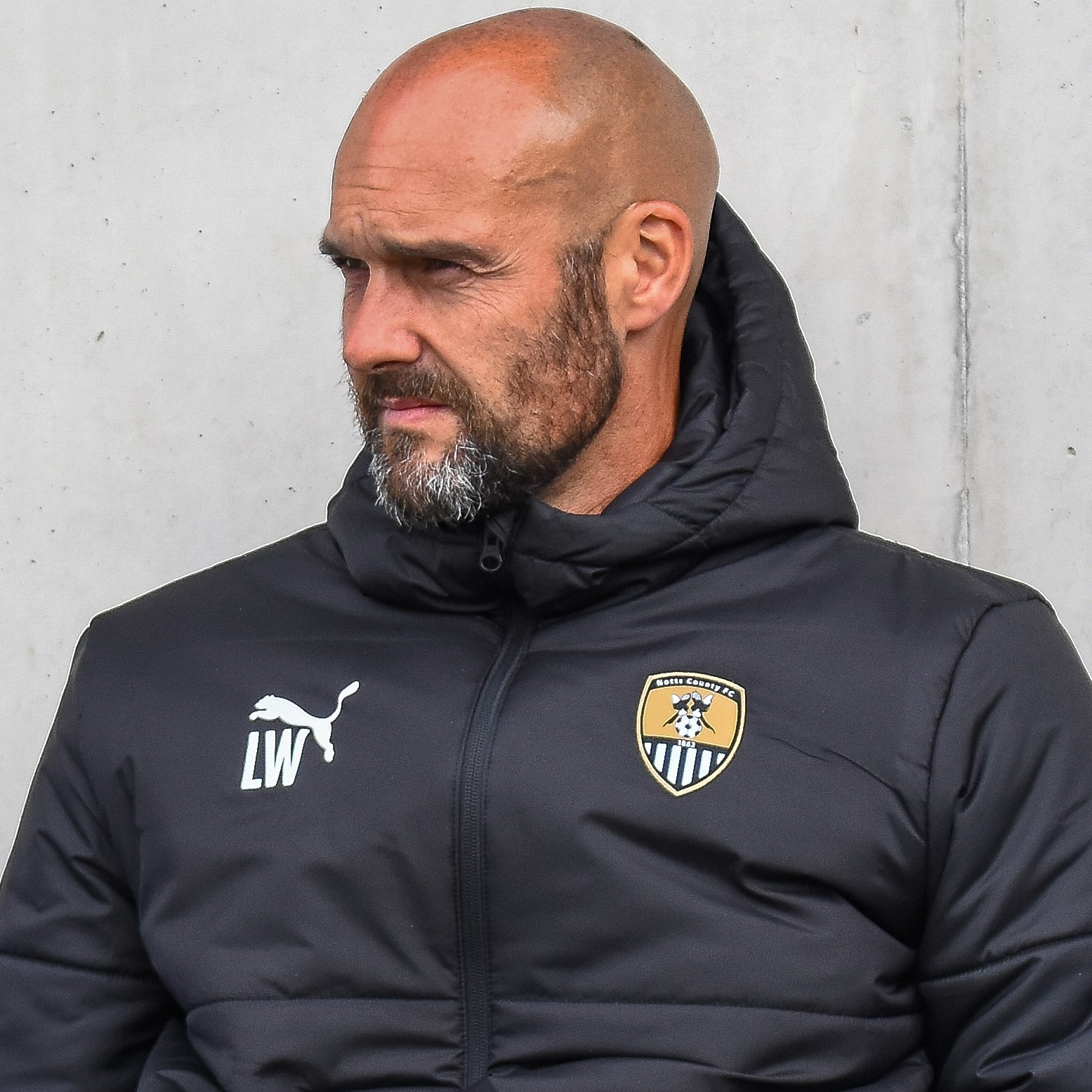
Luke Williams was appointed head coach before the 2022–23 season.

Burchnall was replaced as head coach by former Swindon Town manager Luke Williams, with Ryan Harley as his assistant. Notts County's first player signings came before Williams's arrival, with wing-back Tobi Adebayo-Rowling the first announced on 29 May. The Magpies added two other players to their defensive ranks during the off-season, with Aden Baldwin's signing announced on 23 June, and that of fellow centre-back Geraldo Bajrami coming the following day. Notts also made three attacking signings in the off-season, all of whom featured in the National League North's 2021–22 team of the season. Notts paid undisclosed fees for Gateshead duo Macaulay Langstaff and Cedwyn Scott, who had scored 28 and 24 league goals respectively in the 2021–22 season, with Langstaff also winning the National League North's player of the year award. Joining them from Kidderminster Harriers was winger Sam Austin. Notts made two further permanent transfers as the 2022–23 season progressed: John Bostock, who had been without a club since leaving Doncaster Rovers in the summer, signed for the Magpies on 7 December, and forward Junior Morias, who joined the Magpies on 15 March from Dagenham.

Notts County brought in five players on loan during the 2022–23 season, starting with Leicester City goalkeeper Brad Young, who joined on 26 August. Intended as a season-long loan, the transfer was cut short when an injury forced his return to Leicester in January. In Young's place, the Magpies secured the loan of Archie Mair from Norwich City. Midfielder Quévin Castro joined on a four-month loan from West Bromwich Albion in September. Following Castro's departure, Notts secured the loan of winger Jodi Jones from Oxford United for the remainder of the season. The club's final loan signing was midfielder Connor Lemonheigh-Evans, who joined on loan from Stockport in February. Though intended to be a loan until the end of the season, Lemonheigh-Evans was recalled by Stockport on 24 March.

== Pre-season ==
Notts County played a series of friendlies to prepare for the new season, defeating Basford United 5–1 in their first match. The Magpies then played a behind-closed-doors match against Leicester City at the latter's training ground on 9 July, coming from behind to win 2–1. After a 2–0 win at Alfreton Town on 12 July, Notts played two 70-minute matches against Cambridge United at St Neots Town's Rowley Park on 16 July. Notts lost the first match 2–0, but won the second 3–2 through a seven-minute hat-trick from Langstaff. Following a 1–1 draw at Boston United on 20 July, Notts County played Nottingham Forest in their only home game of pre-season. Forest, fielding a "youthful starting XI", took 1–0 and 2–1 leads, but Notts levelled twice, and the match finished 2–2. In their final pre-season match, Notts played at fellow National League side York City, with the Magpies winning 1–0.

Key

- In result column, Notts County's score shown first
- H = Home match
- A = Away match
- pen. = Penalty kick
- o.g. = Own goal

Results

Date	Opponents	Result	Notts County goalscorers	Source
5 July 2022	Basford United (A)	5–1	Langstaff, Scott, Rodrigues, Cameron, Tait (o.g.)	
9 July 2022	Leicester City (A)	2–1	Mitchell, Baldwin	
12 July 2022	Alfreton Town (A)	2–0	Roberts (pen.), Francis	
16 July 2022	Cambridge United (A)	0–2; 3–2	Langstaff (3)	
20 July 2022	Boston United (A)	1–1	Cameron	
27 July 2022	Nottingham Forest (H)	2–2	Langstaff, Austin	
30 July 2022	York City (A)	1–0	O'Brien	

== National League ==
The 2022–23 National League season saw 24 teams play 46 matches each: two against every other team, with one match at each club's ground. Three points were awarded for a win, one for a draw and none for defeats. At the end of the season, the top-ranked team won promotion to EFL League Two. Unlike the divisions of the EFL, where the runner-up was also guaranteed to win promotion, the National League runner-up entered a six-team play-off, featuring the teams finishing between second and seventh place, to determine the second promoted club.

=== August–October ===
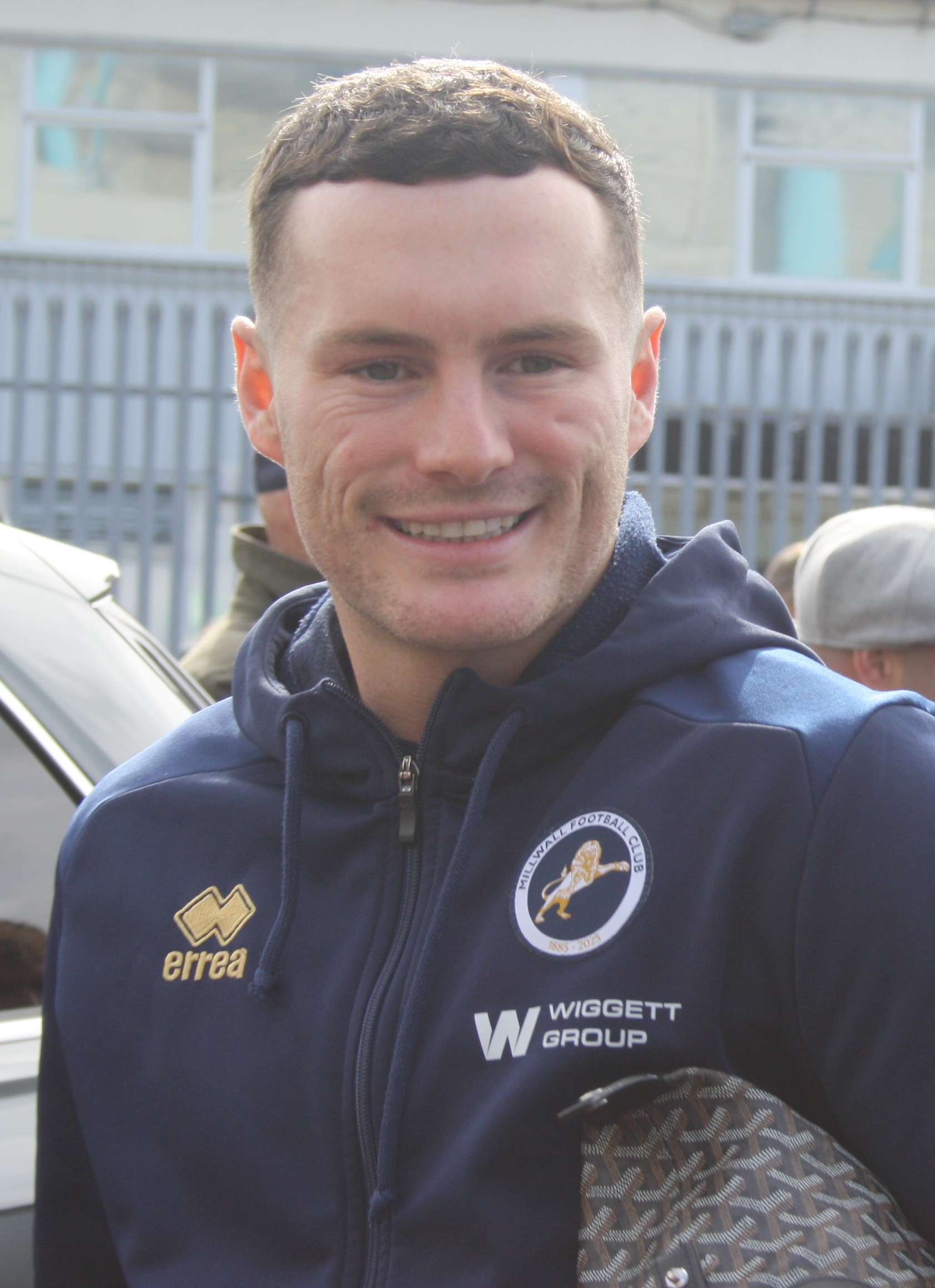
Macaulay Langstaff (pictured in 2026) was National League player of the month for August and September.

Notts County hosted Maidenhead United on the opening day of the season; Langstaff scored two goals on his debut in a 3–0 win. The first away game, a week later at Boreham Wood, ended 2–2, and was the first of three consecutive draws. Following a 1–1 draw at Gateshead, Notts hosted Chesterfield in their second home match of the season. After falling 2–0 down in the 55th minute, Luke Williams made a double substitution in an effort to salvage something from the game, with Austin and Scott coming on in favour of Jim O'Brien and Mitchell. The effects were immediate; Langstaff pulled a goal back in the 60th minute, and headed a second three minutes later from Austin's cross. The match finished 2–2, but Notts fell to tenth place in the league. The Magpies then won consecutive matches for the first time that season: 4–1 at FC Halifax Town (which featured another brace for Langstaff) and 1–0 at home to Solihull Moors. Notts County finished August in fifth place with twelve points from six matches.

September began with a 5–0 away win at Dagenham in which Langstaff scored a hat-trick. Notts were then due to play Bromley at home on 10 September, but this match was postponed following the death of Queen Elizabeth II. When football resumed on 13 September, the Magpies won a fourth consecutive match, this time defeating Aldershot 2–0 at Meadow Lane. Notts County's unbeaten start to the season came to an end four days later in a 3–1 loss at Dorking Wanderers, but Notts won away the following week, this time at York, with loanee Quévin Castro putting the Magpies 1–0 ahead after five minutes with a long-range free kick. Although Fraser Kerr equalised for the home side, Langstaff restored Notts County's lead against his former club shortly before half-time, and scored a second in the second half to seal a 3–1 win. September ended with Notts in third place, taking 21 points from 10 matches.

On 10 October, Langstaff was announced as the National League's player of the month for September. Having previously won the same award for the month of August, Langstaff became the first player to win consecutive National League player of the month awards. His prolific early-season form was receiving increasing media attention, including favourable comparisons to Manchester City's Erling Haaland. Langstaff joked that friends were sending him messages every week to remind him that Haaland was closing in on his goal tally. He told Paul Taylor of The Athletic that comparisons with the City forward were a "massive, massive privilege" and that he hoped "to stay ahead of him", but continued "... it is about Notts; about winning promotion and nothing else. If you asked me whether I would rather get more goals than Haaland this season or, alternatively, win promotion – I would pick promotion without hesitation."

In their first match of October, Notts County defeated Altrincham 3–1 at home. As a result of the previous league leaders Chesterfield's 2–1 defeat to Maidenhead the same day, Wrexham (nicknamed the Red Dragons) and Notts County moved into first and second place in the table, beginning the intense race between the two teams for the league championship. By coincidence, Notts hosted Wrexham in their first meeting of the season three days later. The match attracted 10,741 spectators, and was won 1–0 by the Magpies through a 13th-minute goal by Langstaff, who was able to finish a well-worked free kick routine. The victory put Notts top of the table, a position they retained for the remainder of October after a 3–2 win at Woking, a 3–0 home win over Maidstone United, and a 6–1 win at Wealdstone. The latter was the first time Notts had scored six goals in an away league match since a 6–0 win at Chelsea in February 1924. In their final match of October, Notts stretched their winning run to seven with a 4–0 home win over Torquay, ending the month in first place with 39 points from 16 matches.

=== November–January ===
Notts County's seven-match winning run came to an end in their first match of November, a 1–1 draw at home to Bromley. Notts drew again in their next game, played at Southend United on 8 November; Langstaff and Scott gave Notts 1–0 and 2–1 leads, but Southend levelled twice to secure a 2–2 draw. This result, combined with Wrexham's 3–1 win over Scunthorpe United the following night, saw the Magpies fall to second place. It was the first of four consecutive rounds of fixtures where Notts County and Wrexham would exchange first position. Wrexham were held to a 0–0 draw at Wealdstone on 12 November, allowing Notts to regain top spot with a 2–0 win at Eastleigh. The following week, Notts were held to a 0–0 draw at home to Yeovil Town, a match notable for drawing a record National League crowd of 16,511, the result of a discounted ticket promotion. On the same afternoon, Wrexham defeated Aldershot 2–0, meaning November ended with Notts County in second place, with 45 points from 20 matches.

Notts regained top spot on 3 December; that afternoon, they defeated Scunthorpe 4–1 at Glanford Park while Wrexham were held to a 1–1 draw at York. Notts County's next match, played at Maidenhead on 10 December, was described by Oliver King of the Nottingham Post as a "thrilling encounter". First half goals from Rodrigues, Castro and Langstaff had given Notts a 3–1 lead, but the home side fought back in the second half to level the score at 3–3. In the 83rd minute, Langstaff scored his second when he steered Kyle Cameron's cross past the Maidenhead goalkeeper, and Notts won 4–3. The Magpies finished December with two home matches, the first a 2–0 win over Gateshead in which leading goal scorer Langstaff sustained an injury, keeping him out the following match. Even without their most prolific forward, Notts defeated Oldham Athletic 4–1 on 26 December, and ended 2022 in first place, taking 57 points from 24 matches.

Notts faced Oldham again in the first match of 2023, played on New Year's Day at the latter's Boundary Park. Langstaff returned from injury; he and Scott scored, but the game finished 2–2. The Magpies won their next match 3–0 at Aldershot on 7 January, but were then held to a 1–1 draw with Boreham Wood in their first home game of the year. There then followed an 18-day break in league matches, caused firstly by Notts County's participation in the FA Trophy and then the postponement of their scheduled visits to Chesterfield and Solihull due to freezing weather conditions. Wrexham won two league matches during this period, allowing them to take a three-point lead at the top of the table. With the Red Dragons involved in the FA Cup, the Magpies drew level on points with a 1–0 home win over Halifax on 28 January. They then retook top spot in the final game of January, a 2–1 win in their rearranged game at Solihull. Notts found themselves 1–0 down, but secured victory via two Rodrigues penalties, meaning Notts ended January in first place, taking 68 points from 29 games.

=== February–April ===
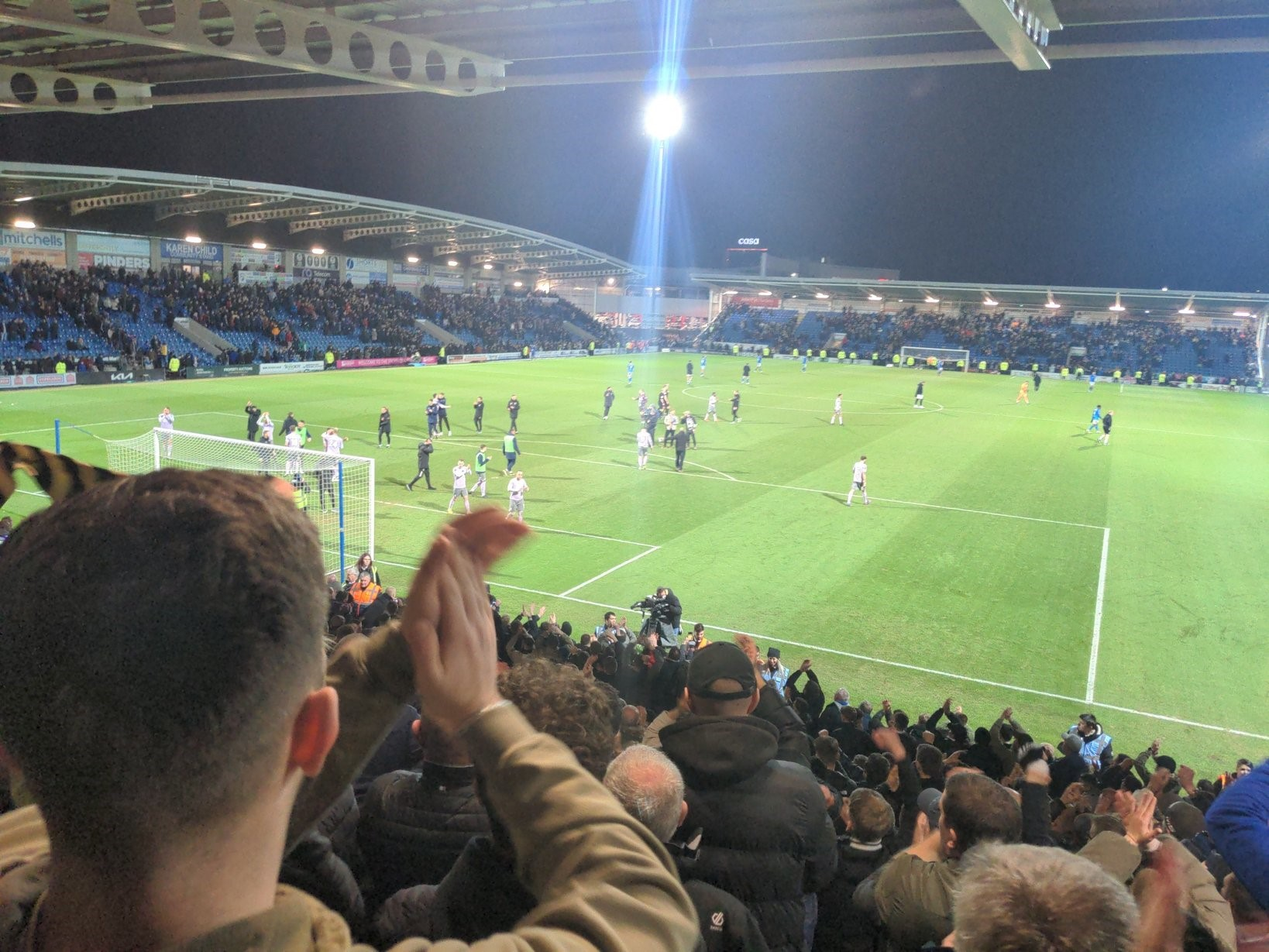
Notts County players applaud their supporters following the team's win at Chesterfield

Notts County's first match in February was at Torquay, a 2–1 win for the Magpies despite playing the final 25 minutes with only ten men. The following week, Notts travelled to Chesterfield for their rearranged game; Langstaff opened the scoring for the away team, controlling a long pass from goalkeeper Sam Slocombe and beating Ross Fitzsimons. Although Chesterfield equalised before half time, they were reduced to ten men in the second half, and Adam Chicksen's 71st minute goal secured a 2–1 away win. Notts scored four goals in each of their next three matches, first beating Barnet 4–1 at Meadow Lane and then beating Yeovil away by the same scoreline, Langstaff scoring a hat-trick in the latter. A 4–0 home win over Southend was Notts County's 25th league match unbeaten, a club record brought to an end on 25 February when Inih Effiong's 86th-minute goal gave Dagenham a 2–1 win at Meadow Lane. On 28 February, Wrexham defeated Chesterfield 2–1 to move ahead of Notts; as a result, the Magpies ended February in second place, with 83 points from 35 matches.

Notts were held to a 1–1 draw at Bromley in their first game of March, but then won back-to-back home games against Dorking and Eastleigh; in both matches, the Magpies won 3–1 having fallen 0–1 behind. Notts were then held to another 1–1 draw at Barnet on 18 March, a result that led to the team falling three points behind Wrexham. Notts followed this with a 4–0 home win over Scunthorpe on 25 March, with Langstaff scoring his 38th and 39th goals, equalling the club record for most goals scored in a single season by an individual player. The record was broken in Notts County's final game of the month, played at Altrincham on 28 March, when Langstaff finished a quickly taken free kick from Bostock to put the Magpies 1–0 up. Archie Mair saved a first-half penalty for the away team, and Rodrigues's second-half penalty made the final score 2–0 to Notts. This match was brought forward from 1 April due to Altrincham's involvement in the FA Trophy, allowing Notts to end March top of the table on goal difference, with 97 points from 41 matches.

National League top three before Wrexham v Notts County
Pos	Team	Pld	W	D	L	GF	GA	GD	Pts
1	Notts County	42	30	10	2	106	36	+70	100
2	Wrexham	41	31	7	3	106	39	+67	100
3	Woking	41	22	9	10	67	42	+25	75

In their first game of April, Notts defeated Wealdstone 3–0, with Langstaff scoring to break the National League record for most goals in a season. That same afternoon, Wrexham lost 3–1 at Halifax, meaning the Magpies and Red Dragons were tied on 100 points. Having already beaten or expected to surpass previous divisional records for wins, points and goals scored, the two teams met at Wrexham's Racecourse Ground on 10 April. With only the champions certain to win promotion, and the runner-up at risk of not going up at all, there was significant interest in the match; it received international coverage from The New York Times, and was characterised in the press as the biggest game in National League or non-League history. Notts led 1–0 at half time through a Bostock free kick in added-on time, but Wrexham established a 3–2 lead during the second half. In the sixth minute of injury time, the Magpies were given the chance to equalise when they were awarded a penalty for a handball, but Wrexham's goalkeeper Ben Foster saved the subsequent attempt from Scott, and the Red Dragons held on to win, taking a three-point lead at the top of the table with a game in hand.

Notts defeated Woking 3–0 at home in their next match, temporarily reducing the gap on Wrexham to one point following the latter's draw at Barnet. However, Wrexham would defeat Yeovil on 18 April to win their game in hand and move four points clear, meaning a victory in either of their two remaining matches would clinch the title. That victory duly came on 22 April, when the Red Dragons beat Boreham Wood. That same day, Notts played their final away match of the season at Maidstone, a 5–2 win in which O'Brien scored a hat-trick. In their final match of the regular season, Notts drew 1–1 with York at Meadow Lane, with Langstaff scoring his 42nd goal. Notts ended the regular season in second place with 107 points from 46 matches, a points tally sufficient to have won any previous National League title.

=== Match details ===
Key

- In result column, Notts County's score shown first
- H = Home match
- A = Away match
- pen. = Penalty kick
- o.g. = Own goal

Results

Date	Opponents	Result	Notts County goalscorers	Attendance	Source
6 August 2022	Maidenhead United (H)	3–0	Langstaff (2), Taylor	6,331	
13 August 2022	Boreham Wood (A)	2–2	Rodrigues (pen.), Mitchell	1,303	
16 August 2022	Gateshead (A)	1–1	Storey (o.g.)	1,825	
20 August 2022	Chesterfield (H)	2–2	Langstaff (2)	8,287	
27 August 2022	FC Halifax Town (A)	4–1	Langstaff (2), Scott, Mitchell	2,371	
29 August 2022	Solihull Moors (H)	1–0	Chicksen	7,004	
3 September 2022	Dagenham & Redbridge (A)	5–0	Langstaff (3), Scott, Chicksen	1,722	
13 September 2022	Aldershot Town (H)	2–0	Scott, Langstaff	5,607	
17 September 2022	Dorking Wanderers (A)	1–3	Scott	2,402	
24 September 2022	York City (A)	3–1	Castro, Langstaff (2)	6,759	
1 October 2022	Altrincham (H)	3–1	Langstaff (2), Chicksen	6,458	
4 October 2022	Wrexham (H)	1–0	Langstaff	10,741	
8 October 2022	Woking (A)	3–2	Rodrigues (pen.), Scott (2)	3,267	
21 October 2022	Maidstone United (H)	3–0	Langstaff, Rodrigues, Scott	6,765	
25 October 2022	Wealdstone (A)	6–1	Langstaff, Chicksen (2), Palmer, Nemane, Bajrami	1,710	
29 October 2022	Torquay United (H)	4–0	Rawlinson, Rodrigues (pen.), Castro, Bajrami	7,563	
1 November 2022	Bromley (H)	1–1	Chicksen	6,389	
8 November 2022	Southend United (A)	2–2	Langstaff, Scott	6,603	
12 November 2022	Eastleigh (A)	2–0	Chicksen, Rodrigues	2,154	
19 November 2022	Yeovil Town (H)	0–0		16,511	
3 December 2022	Scunthorpe United (A)	4–1	Castro, O'Brien, Langstaff, Scott	4,196	
10 December 2022	Maidenhead United (A)	4–3	Rodrigues, Castro, Langstaff (2)	1,467	
13 December 2022	Gateshead (H)	2–0	Francis, Rodrigues	5,539	
26 December 2022	Oldham Athletic (H)	4–1	Scott (2), Cameron, Rodrigues	9,789	
1 January 2023	Oldham Athletic (A)	2–2	Langstaff, Scott	7,312	
7 January 2023	Aldershot Town (A)	3–0	O'Brien, Rodrigues, Nemane	2,039	
10 January 2023	Boreham Wood (H)	1–1	Scott	6,033	
28 January 2023	FC Halifax Town (H)	1–0	Langstaff	7,548	
31 January 2023	Solihull Moors (A)	2–1	Rodrigues (2, 2 pens.)	2,260	
4 February 2023	Torquay United (A)	2–1	Langstaff, Rodrigues (pen.)	2,621	
11 February 2023	Chesterfield (A)	2–1	Langstaff, Chicksen	9,706	
14 February 2023	Barnet (H)	4–1	Scott, Chicksen, Langstaff (2)	6,891	
18 February 2023	Yeovil Town (A)	4–1	Langstaff (3), Rodrigues (pen.)	3,020	
21 February 2023	Southend United (H)	4–0	Langstaff (2), Austin (2)	7,237	
25 February 2023	Dagenham & Redbridge (H)	1–2	Rodrigues	7,441	
4 March 2023	Bromley (A)	1–1	Langstaff	3,417	
11 March 2023	Dorking Wanderers (H)	3–1	Langstaff (2), Palmer	7,060	
14 March 2023	Eastleigh (H)	3–1	Rodrigues (2), Langstaff	6,058	
18 March 2023	Barnet (A)	1–1	Langstaff	2,969	
25 March 2023	Scunthorpe United (H)	4–0	Chicksen, Richards-Everton (o.g.), Langstaff (2)	16,086	
28 March 2023	Altrincham (A)	2–0	Langstaff, Rodrigues (pen.)	2,011	
7 April 2023	Wealdstone (H)	3–0	Austin, Vincent, Langstaff	9,786	
10 April 2023	Wrexham (A)	2–3	Bostock, Cameron	9,924	
15 April 2023	Woking (H)	3–0	Austin (2), Nemane	8,520	
22 April 2023	Maidstone United (A)	5–2	Scott, O'Brien (3, 1 pen.), Rodrigues	2,391	
29 April 2023	York City (H)	1–1	Langstaff	11,336	

=== Partial league table ===
National League final table, leading positions
Pos	Team	Pld	W	D	L	GF	GA	GD	Pts	Qualification
1	Wrexham	46	34	9	3	116	43	+73	111	Division Champions, promoted
2	Notts County	46	32	11	3	117	42	+75	107	Participated in play-offs, promoted
3	Chesterfield	46	25	9	12	85	52	+33	84	Participated in play-offs
4	Woking	46	24	10	12	71	48	+23	82	Participated in play-offs
5	Barnet	46	21	11	14	75	67	+8	74	Participated in play-offs
6	Boreham Wood	46	19	15	12	52	40	+12	72	Participated in play-offs
7	Bromley	46	18	17	11	68	53	+15	71	Participated in play-offs

=== Play-offs ===
==== Semi-final v Boreham Wood ====
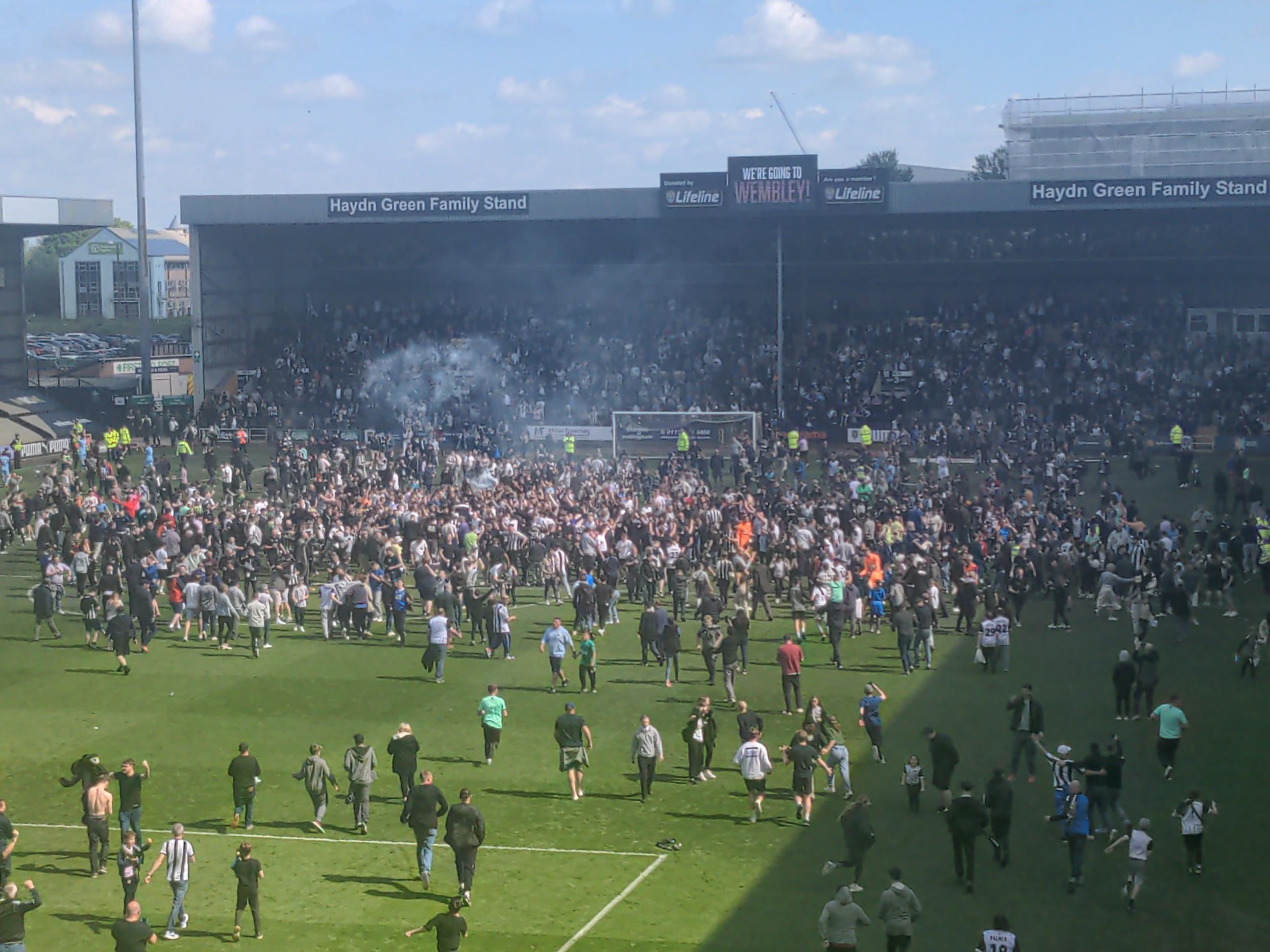
Supporters invade the pitch in celebration following Notts County's semi-final victory

Under the National League's play-off format, second place Notts County and third place Chesterfield advanced directly to the semi-final stage; the pair's opponents were decided in two quarter-finals involving the teams finishing between fourth and seventh. Notts ultimately faced Boreham Wood, the latter having beaten Barnet 2–1 in their quarter-final. Although Boreham Wood had finished 35 points behind Notts in the league standings, closer in points to the relegation places than to the Magpies, Williams anticipated a close match. He told reporters "... on the day, we know that anything can happen and I don't think there is much difference between any of the teams that a fixture is a given". Two days before the match, Boreham Wood signed Eastleigh goalkeeper Joe McDonnell on an emergency loan due to an injury sustained by first-choice goalkeeper Nathan Ashmore in the quarter-final. Notts named the same starting eleven as their final regular season match against York City.

The semi-final, played at Meadow Lane on 7 May, was attended by 15,617 spectators. The Magpies missed a series of chances during the first half, and their wastefulness was punished in the 37th minute when Femi Ilesanmi scored from close range to put Boreham Wood 1–0 up. Aden Baldwin then had two opportunities to equalise for Notts from long range, but Boreham Wood doubled their lead when Lee Ndlovu pounced on a loose pass from Bostock to Baldwin and found himself one-on-one with Slocombe. The away team led 2–0 at half time. Early in the second half, Baldwin's third long-range effort found the back of the net to reduce the deficit to 1–2. The Magpies then had the chance to equalise when they were awarded a penalty for a foul on Rodrigues; Rodrigues took the penalty himself, but saw it saved by McDonnell. The match remained 1–2 until the sixth minute of injury time, when a powerful cross from substitute Jodi Jones met the head of Baldwin, who directed the ball into the net to make the score 2–2 in the final moments of normal time. Both sides had chances in extra time, but the scores remained tied until the final minute, when Jones's effort from the edge of the penalty area found its way past McDonnell, giving Notts a last-ditch 3–2 victory and sparking a pitch invasion from jubilant supporters.

Baldwin's two goals were the first of his professional career. Speaking to reporters after the match about his equalising goal, Baldwin said "it is one of the best feelings I have ever felt – for Jodi to cut in and hit it as hard as he did, I just needed to connect with it, which I did, and I had that realisation that we could only go on to win the game from there." Jones's goal was his first since October 2018; he had suffered from a series of anterior cruciate ligament injuries which had prevented him from playing for much of the intervening period. Discussing the immediate aftermath of his goal, Jones told Ben Fisher of The Guardian "I remember trying to pull my shirt off; I was just so excited I didn't know what to do. I saw all the bench coming towards me, the gaffer trying to chase me but he couldn't keep up." The win meant that Notts County qualified for the play-off final, played at Wembley Stadium on 13 May.

==== Final v Chesterfield ====
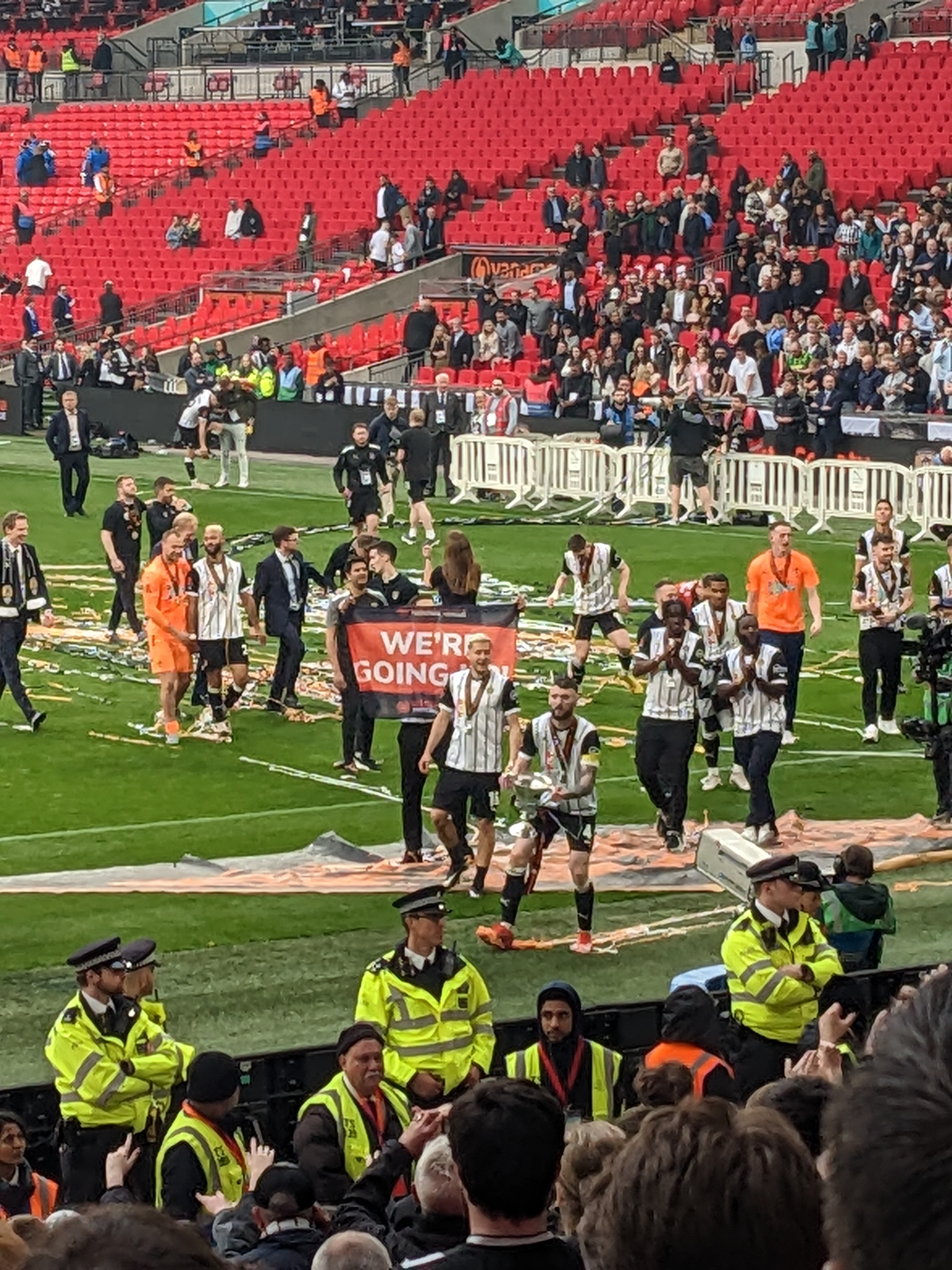
Notts captain Kyle Cameron with the trophy following his team's victory in the play-off final

Notts County faced Chesterfield (nicknamed the Spireites) in the final, the latter having beaten Bromley 3–2 in extra time in the semi-final. Notts County had previously played at Wembley Stadium in the 1990 Third Division play-off final, 1991 Second Division play-off final, 1994 Anglo-Italian Cup final, 1995 Anglo-Italian Cup final, 1996 Second Division play-off final and 2020 National League play-off final. Asked what a win would mean to the club after missing automatic promotion, Williams said "we would feel some sort of justification, a sense of confirmation, that all our hard work paid off". He anticipated "a real huge clash between two very good teams for the level". Williams named an unchanged starting eleven from that which had begun the semi-final.

Watched by 38,138 spectators, the Magpies had to defend an indirect free kick in their own penalty area in the opening minutes, after Slocombe inadvertently took two touches of the ball following a goal kick. Slocombe saved the subsequent attempt from Jeff King, but gave away a penalty for a foul on Andrew Dallas shortly after, and Dallas put Chesterfield 1–0 up; this remained the score at half time. Notts came close to equalising through Austin and Rawlinson during the second half, but the match remained 1–0 until the 87th minute. Awarded a free kick along the left-hand side, Bostock caught goalkeeper Ross Fitzsimons out of position and equalised for the Magpies at the near post. The score was 1–1 at full time.

Chesterfield regained their lead early in the first half of extra time through Armando Dobra, who had time and space to place a shot past Slocombe. Langstaff and Rawlinson both had opportunities to equalise for the Magpies, but the Spireites led 2–1 at half time in extra time. Notts equalised early in the second half through Rodrigues, whose bouncing volley looped into the back of the net. There was no further scoring, and the match finished 2–2, meaning the second promoted club would be decided by a penalty shoot-out. Late in extra time, Williams substituted Slocombe, who had not saved a penalty during the season, for Archie Mair, who had. Mair saved two of Chesterfield's first four penalties, while Langstaff, Rodrigues and Jones all scored with Notts County's first three kicks. This gave Bostock the opportunity to win the match for the Magpies, but his attempted panenka hit the crossbar. Joe Quigley scored Chesterfield's fifth and final penalty, leaving Cedwyn Scott to seal promotion for his team with Notts County's final kick.

Notts County won promotion despite leading their two play-off matches for a combined total of about one minute. In post-play-off final interviews, Williams paid tribute to his team, saying "I've learned that when these guys look like they are done, they are not – they have another roll of the dice". Williams credited the Notts goalkeeping coach Tom Weal for his role in Bostock's equaliser, revealing that, in pre-match analysis, Weal had noticed the Chesterfield goalkeeper's tendency to leave "big, big gaps" when defending free kicks, and had put this "in the mind of the players". Bostock was able to joke about his penalty miss: "I thought it was crossbar challenge", he told BT Sport. Bostock's miss meant the promotion-winning penalty was taken by Scott, who admitted to being "a bit nervous" as he prepared to take his kick following "the affairs that happened at Wrexham" (the pivotal league match where he had seen his injury-time penalty to equalise saved). "That hit me hard" he said, but this time "gladly I put it away".

==== Match details ====
Key

- In result column, Notts County's score shown first
- H = Home match
- N = Match played at a neutral venue
- pen. = Penalty kick
- o.g. = Own goal

Results
Date	Round	Opponents	Result	Notts County goalscorers	Attendance	Source
7 May 2023	Semi-final	Boreham Wood (H)	3–2 (a.e.t.)	Baldwin (2), Jones	15,617	
13 May 2023	Final	Chesterfield (N)	2–2 (a.e.t.); 4–3 (pens.)	Bostock, Rodrigues	38,138	

== Cup competitions ==
=== FA Cup ===
Notts County entered the FA Cup at the fourth qualifying round stage, where they were drawn at home to Coalville Town of the Southern Football League's Premier Division Central. After making eight changes from their previous league game, the Magpies found themselves 1–0 down almost immediately. Although Austin quickly equalised for Notts, Coalville restored their lead in the 23rd minute, and led 2–1 at half time. In the second half, Notts brought on two first-team regulars, Palmer and Rodrigues, and were level in the 66th minute through Austin's second goal of the game. Langstaff was brought on immediately afterwards in an effort to win the match, but Coalville retook the lead in the 86th minute through Luke Shaw, and held on to win 3–2 in a major upset.

==== Match details ====
Key

- In result column, Notts County's score shown first
- H = Home match
- A = Away match
- pen. = Penalty kick
- o.g. = Own goal

Results
Date	Round	Opponents	Result	Notts County goalscorers	Attendance	Source
15 October 2022	Fourth qualifying round	Coalville Town (H)	2–3	Austin (2)	5,060	

=== FA Trophy ===
Notts County's FA Trophy campaign began in the third round at home to Chorley of National League North. Notts made six changes from their previous league match, including bringing in Bostock for his first start for the club. Chorley took a 1–0 lead through Connor Hall, but Notts were soon level through Austin, who equalised in the 33rd minute. In first-half injury time, Scott Leather turned a cross from Nemane into his own net to give Notts the lead. With no further scoring, Notts won 2–1.

In the fourth round, the Magpies were again drawn at home, this time against fellow National League club Maidstone United. Notts made six changes to their starting eleven from their previous league match, and also included youth team members Madou Cisse and Charlie Gill on the bench; both made their debuts in this match. Regan Booty gave Maidstone a 1–0 lead with a first-half penalty, and the away side extended their lead when Roarie Deacon fired into an empty net from 45 yards, after Notts were caught in possession. Chicksen reduced the deficit to 1–2 shortly afterwards, and Notts levelled the game late on when Austin was able to follow up on his own rebound. The match went to penalties, with the away team winning 6–5, Palmer seeing the decisive penalty saved by the Maidstone goalkeeper.

==== Match details ====
Key

- In result column, Notts County's score shown first
- H = Home match
- A = Away match
- pen. = Penalty kick
- o.g. = Own goal

Results
Date	Round	Opponents	Result	Notts County goalscorers	Attendance	Source
20 December 2022	Third	Chorley (H)	2–1	Austin, Leather (o.g.)	2,040	
15 January 2023	Fourth	Maidstone United (H)	2–2; 5–6 (pens.)	Chicksen, Austin	2,405	

== Player statistics ==
Notts County played 51 matches in the 2022–23 season: 46 in the league, two in the play-offs, one in FA Cup qualifying and two in the FA Trophy. Matt Palmer was the only player to feature in every game, starting 48 times and being brought off the bench as a substitute in the other three matches. Across all competitions, Notts made use of 30 different players, four of whom were goalkeepers. A total of nineteen different players scored 128 goals between them across all competitions.

Key

Pos = Playing position

Nat. = Nationality

Apps = Appearances

GK = Goalkeeper

DF = Defender

MF = Midfielder

FW = Forward

= Yellow cards

= Red cards

Numbers in parentheses denote appearances as substitute.

Pos.	Nat.	Name	National League		Play-offs		FA Cup		FA Trophy		Total		Discipline	
Pos.	Nat.	Name	Apps	Goals	Apps	Goals	Apps	Goals	Apps	Goals	Apps	Goals	A yellow rectangular card	A red rectangular card
DF	ENG	Tobi Adebayo-Rowling	6 (5)	0	0	0	1	0	1	0	8 (5)	0	0	0
MF	ENG	Sam Austin	20 (21)	5	2	0	1	2	2	2	25 (21)	9	1	0
DF	ALB	Geraldo Bajrami	19 (12)	2	0	0	1	0	2	0	22 (12)	2	5	0
DF	ENG	Aden Baldwin	29 (1)	0	2	2	0	0	1	0	32 (1)	2	4	0
MF	ENG	John Bostock	14 (9)	1	2	1	0	0	1	0	17 (9)	2	1	0
DF	ENG	Richard Brindley	26 (3)	0	0 (2)	0	1	0	1	0	28 (5)	0	7	1
GK	IRE	Tiernan Brooks	4	0	0	0	0	0	0	0	4	0	1	0
DF	SCO	Kyle Cameron	44	2	2	0	0	0	2	0	48	2	7	0
MF	POR	Quévin Castro	4 (10)	4	0	0	1	0	0	0	5 (10)	4	1	0
DF	ZIM	Adam Chicksen	44	10	2	0	0	0	1	1	47	11	2	0
FW	ENG	Madou Cisse	0	0	0	0	0	0	0 (1)	0	0 (1)	0	0	0
MF	ENG	Ed Francis	6 (4)	1	0	0	1	0	1 (1)	0	8 (5)	1	4	0
FW	ENG	Charlie Gill	0	0	0	0	0	0	0 (1)	0	0 (1)	0	0	0
FW	MLT	Jodi Jones	8 (8)	0	0 (2)	1	0	0	0	0	8 (10)	1	5	0
FW	ENG	Macaulay Langstaff	44 (1)	42	2	0	0 (1)	0	0	0	46 (2)	42	2	0
MF	WAL	Connor Lemonheigh-Evans	1 (4)	0	0	0	0	0	0	0	1 (4)	0	0	0
DF	ENG	Lucien Mahovo	0	0	0	0	1	0	0	0	1	0	0	0
GK	SCO	Archie Mair	3 (1)	0	0 (1)	0	0	0	1	0	4 (2)	0	2	0
FW	GRN	Kairo Mitchell	1 (14)	2	0	0	1	0	1 (1)	0	3 (16)	2	1	0
FW	ENG	Junior Morias	0 (2)	0	0	0	0	0	0	0	0 (2)	0	0	0
FW	FRA	Aaron Nemane	35 (3)	3	2	0	0	0	2	0	39 (3)	3	4	0
MF	IRE	Jim O'Brien	21 (6)	5	0 (1)	0	0	0	1	0	22 (7)	5	5	0
MF	ENG	Matt Palmer	44 (2)	2	2	0	0 (1)	0	2	0	48 (3)	2	4	0
DF	WAL	Connell Rawlinson	27 (1)	1	2	0	1	0	1	0	31 (1)	1	6	0
FW	POR	Rúben Rodrigues	43	18	2	1	0 (1)	0	0	0	45 (1)	19	9	1
FW	ENG	Cedwyn Scott	21 (15)	15	0 (2)	0	0	0	1	0	22 (17)	15	1	0
GK	ENG	Sam Slocombe	39	0	2	0	0	0	0	0	41	0	5	0
MF	ENG	Joel Taylor	2	1	0	0	1	0	0	0	3	1	1	0
MF	ENG	Frank Vincent	1 (8)	1	0	0	0	0	0	0	1 (8)	1	1	0
GK	ENG	Brad Young	0	0	0	0	1	0	1	0	2	0	1	0

== Death of Jason Turner ==
Notts County's season was affected by the sudden death, on 30 March, of Jason Turner, the club's chief executive officer, at the age of 50. Among those paying tribute to Turner were the club's owners, Christoffer and Alexander Reedtz; head coach Luke Williams, players from the club and officials from others. The club's first match following Turner's death, the home game with Wealdstone on 7 April, was attended by his family, and preceded by a minute's applause, with the team and coaching staff wearing t-shirts bearing Turner's image. Williams dedicated his team's 3–0 win to Turner: "I think that was fitting for Jason," he told BBC Radio Nottingham. Notts made a large banner featuring Turner in tribute to him; this was taken to Wembley Stadium and displayed there during the play-off final. The players also included a framed photo of him in their celebrations after being presented with the play-off trophy.

== Records and awards ==
=== Records ===
The team broke numerous club records during the 2022–23 season. The 1997–98 team had held Notts County's record for most points in a season (99) and fewest league defeats (5). Its 2022–23 counterparts bettered both of these records, accumulating 107 points and being beaten only 3 times. The 32 wins achieved during 2022–23 surpassed the previous record of 30 held by the 1970–71 team. Between 24 September 2022 and 25 February 2023, Notts County were unbeaten in 25 league matches. This exceeded the previous record of 19 league matches, achieved between 26 April 1930 and 17 December 1930, encompassing the final game of the 1929–30 season and first 18 of 1930–31. In the latter season, Tom Keetley scored 39 goals for the Magpies as they won promotion from Third Division South. This stood as the record for most goals scored for Notts County by an individual player in a single season until beaten by Macaulay Langstaff's 42 goals during 2022–23. Langstaff also broke the previous National League record for goals in a season, beating Ricky Miller's 40 goals for Dover Athletic in 2016–17. In total, the team scored 117 league goals during the 2022–23 season, 10 more than its 1959–60 counterparts and the previous record holder.

=== Awards ===
A Notts County player was recognised as National League player of the month four times during the 2022–23 season. Three of these awards were won by Macaulay Langstaff, who was player of the month for August, September and March. Kyle Cameron was named player of the month for December. Langstaff was awarded National League player of the year, while he and Cameron were also named in the National League's team of the year, alongside their Notts County teammates Adam Chicksen, Matt Palmer and Rúben Rodrigues. Luke Williams won manager of the month awards twice during the season, in October and March.

== Aftermath and legacy ==
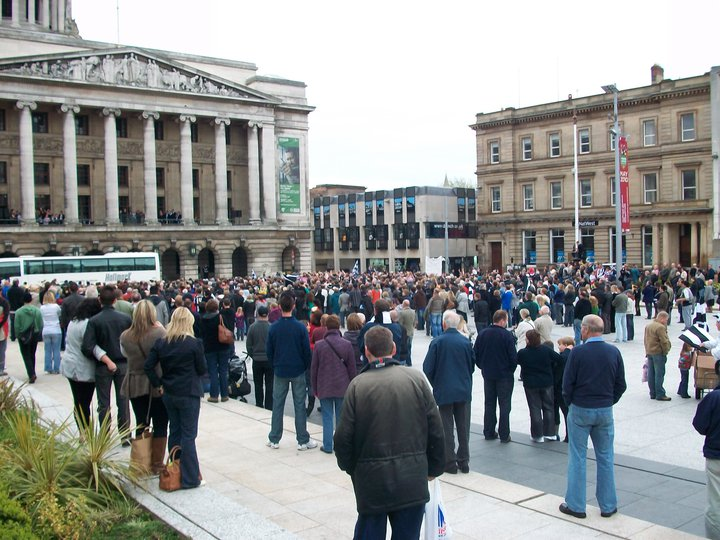
The civic reception after Notts County's 2010 promotion. No such event took place in 2023.

Promotion meant Notts County regained their status as the oldest EFL club, an important part of their identity before relegation in 2019. Luke Williams described it as an "enormous ... massive moment in the history of the club. We have shut the door on the worst times the club has experienced since its beginning". The team returned to Nottingham the day following the play-off final, greeted by hundreds of supporters at Meadow Lane. There were no civic celebrations in the city's Old Market Square to mark the team's achievement, with Nottingham City Council, months away from effectively declaring bankruptcy, initially announcing that none could take place due to pressure on the council's budget. Following criticism, the council announced that it wanted to stage an event before the start of the following season, though Notts County eventually declined this invitation. Council leader David Mellen apologised for the initial decision, saying it had "not been the council's finest hour".

The necessity of Notts County having to win promotion via the play-offs despite finishing the season with 107 points, a record for a team finishing second, led to "increasing scrutiny" of the number of promotion and relegation places between the National League and EFL. "We want to make it [more promotion places] happen," Mark Ives, the National League's general manager, said following the play-off final. "Everyone would think it is fair that the two teams with more than 100 points went up. We were at risk of that not happening. The issue for me is when and how it works." In February 2025, the 72 National League clubs formally wrote to the EFL to request an additional promotion and relegation place between the two leagues, with Notts County's experience cited as a reason to support the change. The 2025–26 National League season unfolded in a similar manner, with Rochdale and York City meeting in the final game to decide which team was automatically promoted. Coverage again referenced Notts County's 2022–23 season, with Sam Slocombe interviewed about the prospects of the side finishing second.

Notts County's season-long rivalry with Wrexham was the focus of several episodes of season two of Welcome to Wrexham, the FX show documenting actors Ryan Reynolds and Rob McElhenney's takeover of the club. Episode 2, titled "Nott Yet", focused on Notts County's 1–0 win over Wrexham in their first meeting of the season, while episode 12, "Hand of Foz", documented Wrexham's 3–2 win in the second and pivotal match. The final episode, "Up the Town?", featured interviews with Luke Williams, John Bostock, Macaulay Langstaff and Cedwyn Scott, and the episode ended with footage of Scott's promotion-winning penalty at Wembley. Scott described the latter as "a nice touch", drawing supportive comments from both McElhenney and Reynolds.
