= Geraldo Bajrami =

English footballer (born 1999)

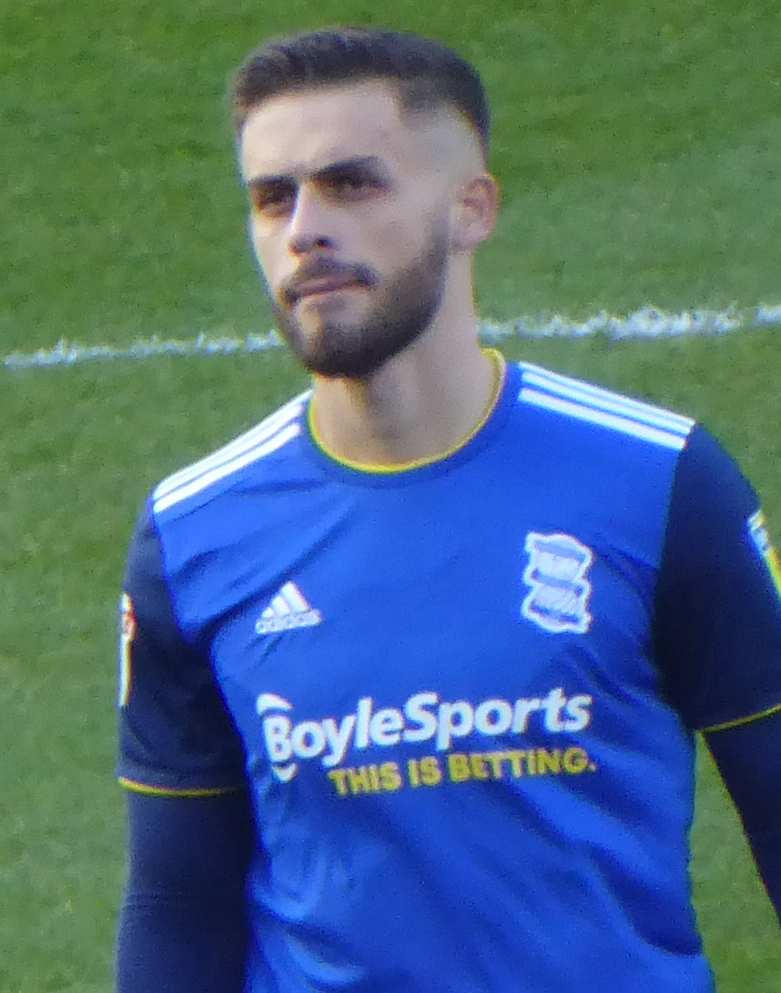
- Bajrami with Birmingham City in 2019

Personal information
- Full name: Geraldo Bajrami
- Date of birth: 24 September 1999 (age 27)
- Place of birth: Birmingham, England
- Height: 6 ft 2 in (1.87 m)
- Position: Centre-back

Team information
- Current team: Teuta

Youth career
- 200?–2018: Birmingham City

Senior career*
Years	Team	Apps	(Gls)
2018–2021	Birmingham City	2	(0)
2020	→ Solihull Moors (loan)	4	(0)
2021–2022	Kidderminster Harriers	34	(1)
2022–2024	Notts County	31	(2)
2024–2026	Burton Albion	1	(0)
2025–2026	→ Crawley Town (loan)	28	(2)
2026–	Teuta	0	(0)

International career
2019–2020	Albania U21	8	(0)
- * Club domestic league appearances and goals as of 17:29, 2 July 2026 (UTC)

Geraldo Bajrami (born 24 September 1999) is a professional footballer who plays as a centre-back for Kategoria Superiore club Teuta.

He came through the youth system at Birmingham City, and made his EFL Championship debut in 2019. He spent time on loan at Solihull Moors of the National League in 2020, and was released in 2021. After a season with National League North club Kidderminster Harriers, he moved up a division to join Notts County, helped them gain promotion to the Football League, but missed the entire 2023–24 EFL League Two season with injury. He joined Burton Albion in 2024. Bajrami was born in England to Albanian parents, and has represented Albania at under-21 level.

== Club career ==
=== Early life and youth career ===
Bajrami was born in Birmingham in 1999, just two weeks after his Albanian parents left Kosovo because of the war. He was raised in the Quinton district and attended Priory School in Edgbaston. He had two unsuccessful trials with Birmingham City's Academy before he was accepted at under-14 level, and took up a two-year scholarship in July 2016. Academy coach Steve Spooner described him as "quite an unassuming young man but is very much a leader and is very popular with the rest of the players."

He captained the club's under-18 team that reached the semifinal of the 2017–18 FA Youth Cup, performing well in a defensive partnership with Ryan Stirk against a very strong Chelsea side, and signed his first professional contract, of one year, at the end of the season. He went on to captain Birmingham's under-23 team in 2018–19, making 36 appearances over the season, as they finished as runners-up in the Professional Development League northern section and lost out to Leeds United on penalties for the overall title. He was offered a two-year deal in March 2019, and signed it in late June.

=== Birmingham City ===
A hernia operation at the end of the season meant that Bajrami missed out on the first-team's pre-season fixtures. He was fit to make his competitive debut in the EFL Cup first round on 6 August 2019. Manager Pep Clotet fielded an inexperienced team for the visit to Portsmouth, and Bajrami played the whole of the 3–0 defeat. With Marc Roberts and Jake Clarke-Salter injured, he made his Football League debut on 14 December 2019, partnering Harlee Dean in central defence in a 3–2 defeat at home to Championship leaders West Bromwich Albion. He kept his place for the next match, a 3–0 loss to Hull City, before Clotet tried other options.

Bajrami joined National League club Solihull Moors on 20 February 2020 on a youth loan to the end of the season. He had made four appearances in the starting eleven by the time the National League season was first suspended and then ended early because of the COVID-19 pandemic. He was an unused substitute for Birmingham at the end of that season, and was not part of the first-team matchday squad at all in 2020–21. In May 2021, the club confirmed that he would leave when his contract expired at the end of the season. His last appearance was for Birmingham's U23 team as they beat Sheffield United U23 in the national final of the 2020–21 Professional Development League.

=== Kidderminster Harriers ===
Bajrami signed for National League North club Kidderminster Harriers on 19 August 2021, and made his debut two days later, starting in a 3–0 win against Blyth Spartans in place of Keith Lowe, who was unavailable because of illness.

=== Notts County ===
On 24 June 2022, Bajrami signed for National League club Notts County alongside Kidderminster teammate Sam Austin, Bajrami signing for a compensation fee on a two-year contract. He appeared in 31 league matches, scoring twice, as Notts returned to the Football League via the play-offs. Bajrami lasted just 11 minutes of the opening fixture of 2023–24 before suffering a knee injury which kept him out for the whole season, at the end of which the club offered him a new contract.

=== Burton Albion ===
Bajrami turned down Notts County's offer of a new contract, and on 13 June 2024 he agreed to join League One club Burton Albion on a two-year deal, to begin after his Notts County contract expired. He missed the first two matches of the season with an ankle injury, and made an eventful debut on 17 August. He replaced Kegs Chauke after 75 minutes and Burton took a 3–2 lead, but six minutes into stoppage time Bajrami was adjudged to have fouled Aden Flint from a corner; he received a yellow card and Mansfield equalised from the penalty. Two minutes into the next match, he went down with an injury to his right leg; it was later confirmed as another anterior cruciate ligament injury, and he would again miss the rest of the season.

=== Crawley Town ===
On 22 August 2025 Bajrami joined EFL League Two club Crawley Town on a season long loan deal.

On 12 May 2026, Burton said the player would leave in the summer once his contract expired.

=== Teuta ===
On 2 July 2026, Bajrami joined Albanian Kategoria Superiore club Teuta.

== International career ==
In January 2019, Bajrami attended a training camp for Albanian youth players, and applied for an Albanian passport in the hope of being selected for their under-21 team ahead of the upcoming 2021 European Championship qualifiers. He made his debut in the starting eleven for a 2–1 defeat at home to Turkey U21 on 23 March; he played the whole match, and was booked in the second half. He made eight appearances in all.

== Career statistics ==
As of end of 2025–26 season

Appearances and goals by club, season and competition
Club	Season	League			FA Cup		EFL Cup		Other		Total	
Club	Season	Division	Apps	Goals	Apps	Goals	Apps	Goals	Apps	Goals	Apps	Goals
Birmingham City	2019–20	Championship	2	0	0	0	1	0	—		3	0
Birmingham City	2020–21	Championship	0	0	0	0	0	0	—		0	0
Birmingham City	Total		2	0	0	0	1	0	—		3	0
Solihull Moors (loan)	2019–20	National League	4	0	—		—		—		4	0
Kidderminster Harriers	2021–22	National League North	34	1	7	0	—		1 (Note: Appearance(s) in FA Trophy)	0	42	1
Notts County	2022–23	National League	31	2	1	0	—		2	0	34	2
Notts County	2023–24	League Two	0	0	0	0	1	0	0	0	1	0
Notts County	Total		31	2	1	0	1	0	2	0	35	2
Burton Albion	2024–25	League One	1	0	0	0	0	0	1 (Note: Appearance in EFL Trophy)	0	2	0
Burton Albion	2025–26	League One	0	0	0	0	1	0	0	0	1	0
Burton Albion	Total		1	0	0	0	1	0	1	0	3	0
Crawley Town (loan)	2025–26	League Two	28	2	1	0	0	0	1	1	30	3
Career total			100	5	9	0	3	0	5	1	117	6

== Honours ==
Notts County

- National League play-offs: 2023
