= Andrew Dallas =

Andrew Dallas may refer to:

- Andrew Dallas (referee) (born 1983), Scottish football referee
- Andrew Dallas (footballer) (born 1999), Scottish football player
