= Luke Williams (football manager) =

English football manager (born 1981)

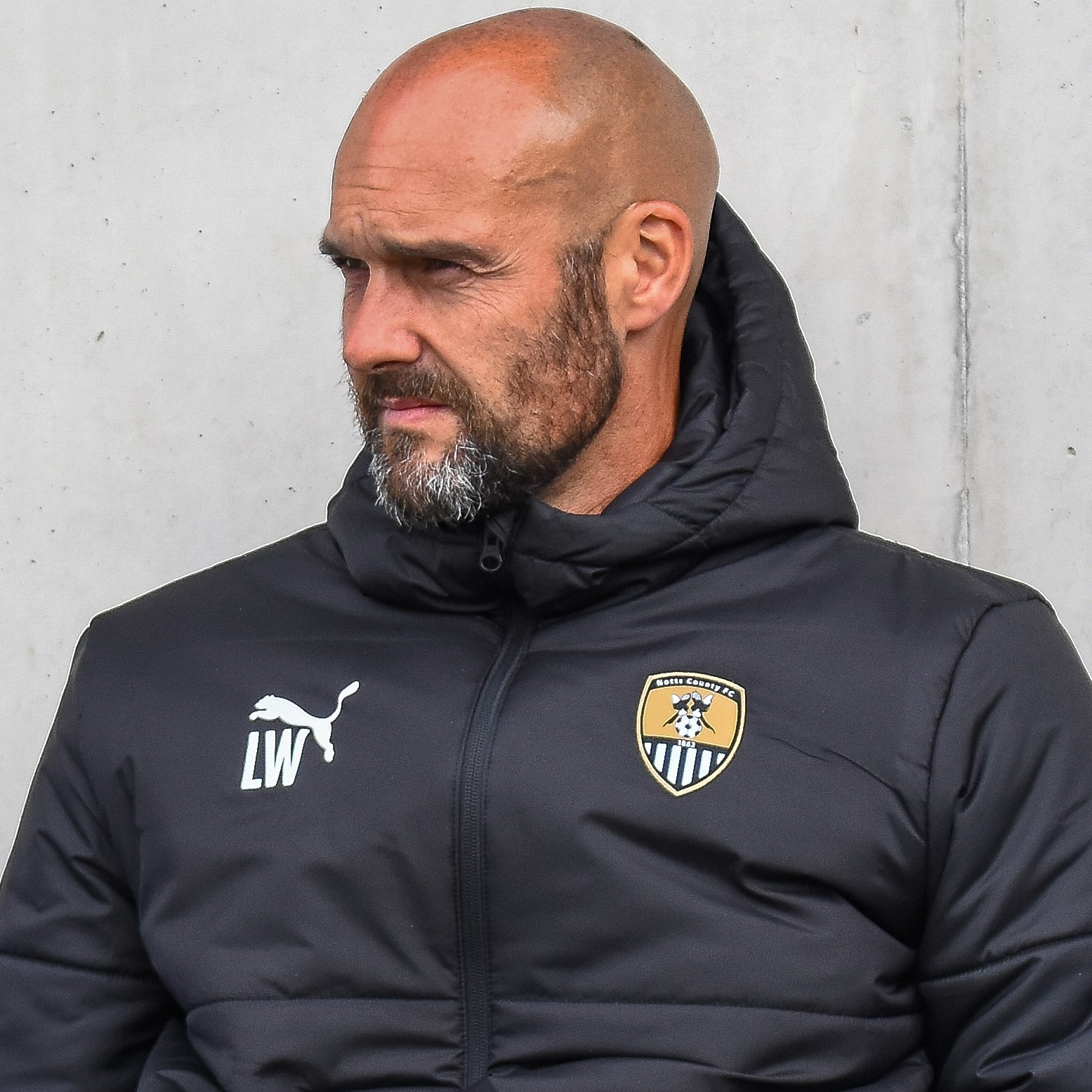
- Williams with Notts County in 2022

Personal information
- Date of birth: 1 May 1981 (age 45)
- Place of birth: Leytonstone, London, England

Youth career
- Years: Team
- –1997: Norwich City
- 1997–2000: Bristol Rovers

Managerial career
- 2015–2017: Swindon Town
- 2022–2024: Notts County
- 2024–2025: Swansea City
- 2025–2026: Peterborough United

Luke Williams (born 1 May 1981) is an English professional football manager who was most recently manager of EFL League One club Peterborough United.

Born in London, Williams played youth football but suffered an injury at age 19, which stopped him from playing professionally. He began his coaching career at Leyton Orient and West Ham United. He spent several years coaching Brighton & Hove Albion's under-21s and made his first-team managerial debut with Swindon Town in 2015. After coaching Bristol City's under-23s, Williams became the assistant coach to Russell Martin at Milton Keynes Dons in 2019 and Swansea City in 2021.

Williams was appointed head coach of Notts County in 2022, leading them to Football League promotion in his first season and breaking several club records, including the most wins and points in a season. In 2024, he returned to Swansea City as head coach before joining Peterborough a year later.

== Early life ==
Williams was born in London, England, in 1981. He attended school in Waltham Abbey. Williams played football at youth level for Norwich City, but was released at age 16. He then joined Bristol Rovers as an apprentice after a successful trial. Williams also played for his school football team and left school aged 16 without GCSEs. At age 19, he suffered a knee injury and failed to win a contract with Leyton Orient, so he decided to focus on coaching.

Between ages 19 and 23, Williams had five operations in four years to correct his knee injury. He also suffered a broken hip and fractured skull from a car crash in his early 20s, and was stabbed with a champagne flute on a night out in London, which he believed may have caused him to suffer post-traumatic stress disorder.

== Career ==
=== Early career ===
Williams began coaching youth teams at Leyton Orient and West Ham United, and became an FA Skills Coach. He undertook warehouse work and drove minibuses to earn extra money. Williams spent 18 months coaching children at London Fields on Saturday mornings and also coached young offenders for West Ham's community programme. He coached Leyton Orient's under-14s in the evenings and also worked as a teaching assistant at Braintree College.

He later became a development coach at Brighton & Hove Albion, where he managed the club's under-21 and reserve sides for several years under first-team manager Gus Poyet. Williams's side were the first Brighton team to play at the club's Amex Stadium, which opened in 2011, as they beat Eastbourne Borough in the Sussex Senior Challenge Cup final.

=== Swindon Town and subsequent coaching ===
In 2013, Williams was appointed assistant manager to Mark Cooper at League One club Swindon Town, and helped the team reach the 2015 play-offs before losing to Preston North End in the final. Following Cooper's departure, Williams worked as assistant to Lee Power and Martin Ling, before becoming caretaker manager in December 2015 after Ling's resignation.

The following month, Williams was named manager until the end of the season. He then signed a five-year contract as head coach after winning six of his 10 games in charge. In November 2016, Tim Sherwood was named the club's director of football and began coaching the team alongside Williams. Williams left Swindon in May 2017 by mutual agreement following the club's relegation to League Two at the end of the 2016–17 season.

Following his departure, Williams became head coach of Bristol City's under-23s in 2017, before becoming assistant to Russell Martin at Milton Keynes Dons in 2019 and Swansea City in 2021. He left the latter in 2022. At both clubs, Williams assisted Martin in coaching a possession-based style of play. Their MK Dons side set a new British record at the time, scoring after a 56-pass move.

=== Notts County ===
On 14 June 2022, Williams returned to management with National League club Notts County. He was awarded the National League Manager of the Month award for October 2022, winning all six matches across the month, with the club sat top of the league. Williams won the same award in March 2023 as County remained unbeaten throughout the month.

In his first season with the club, Notts County earned a club record-breaking 107 points, but finished second in the league behind Wrexham. County scored 117 goals throughout the campaign and set a new club record unbeaten run in the league of 25 games. They also achieved the most wins in a season, with 32 wins. In the play-offs, Williams led County to promotion, defeating Chesterfield on penalties in the play-off final at Wembley Stadium.

Williams's side regularly dominated possession against opposition teams, losing just three of their 46 league games in his first season, while using short corners to maintain possession and increase the likelihood of scoring goals. Defensively, despite County conceding just 52 goals in all competitions in his first season, they conceded 49 goals in the first four months of his second season. Williams left County in January 2024, with the club fifth in the league and having scored 55 goals, the highest across England's top four divisions.

=== Swansea City ===
On 5 January 2024, Williams returned to Championship club Swansea City as head coach on a three-and-a-half-year contract, replacing Michael Duff mid-season. He was chosen by Swansea for his attacking, possession-based style of play.

Williams took charge of his first match the following day, a 2–0 victory against Morecambe in the FA Cup, with goals from Arsenal loanee Charlie Patino and striker Jerry Yates. Despite a difficult start against four of the top six teams in the league, Williams improved Swansea's form over the last quarter of the season; they avoided relegation and finished 14th in the league.

In February 2025, Williams left Swansea after a run of seven defeats in nine Championship matches.

=== Peterborough United ===
On 29 October 2025, Williams was appointed manager of EFL League One side Peterborough United on a contract until June 2028. On 19 September 2026, Williams was sacked by Peterborough United, following a poor run of form.

== Managerial statistics ==
As of match played 19 September 2026

Managerial record by team and tenure
Team	From	To	Record					Ref.
Team	From	To	P	W	D	L	Win %	Ref.
Swindon Town	30 December 2015	5 May 2017	75	20	22	33	26.7	
Notts County	14 July 2022	5 January 2024	83	48	16	19	57.8	
Swansea City	5 January 2024	17 February 2025	58	19	11	28	32.8	
Peterborough United	29 October 2025	19 September 2026	47	17	10	20	36.2	
Total			263	104	59	100	39.5	

== Honours ==
=== Manager ===
Brighton & Hove Albion U23

- Sussex Senior Challenge Cup: 2011

Notts County

- National League play-offs: 2023

=== Individual ===
- National League Manager of the Month: October 2022, March 2023
