= Frank Vincent (footballer) =

English footballer (born 1999)

Personal information
- Full name: Francis William Vincent
- Date of birth: 23 April 1999 (age 27)
- Place of birth: Hackney, England
- Height: 5 ft 9 in (1.76 m)
- Position: Midfielder

Team information
- Current team: Dorking Wanderers
- Number: 33

Youth career
- Queens Park Rangers
- –2017: Barnet

Senior career*
Years	Team	Apps	(Gls)
2017–2021	AFC Bournemouth	0	(0)
2019–2020	→ Torquay United (loan)	32	(0)
2020	→ Scunthorpe United (loan)	6	(0)
2021	→ Walsall (loan)	8	(0)
2021–2023	Notts County	32	(4)
2022–2023	→ Aldershot Town (loan)	18	(1)
2023–2025	Dagenham & Redbridge	51	(2)
2024–2025	→ Woking (loan)	13	(1)
2025–	Dorking Wanderers	54	(3)
- * Club domestic league appearances and goals as of 12:44, 31 October 2026 (UTC)

Francis William 'Frank' Vincent (born 23 April 1999) is an English footballer who plays as a midfielder for National League South side, Dorking Wanderers.

== Career ==
Vincent joined AFC Bournemouth from Barnet at the end of the 2016–17 season. On 31 January 2019, he joined National League South side Torquay United on loan until the end of the season. In July 2019, he rejoined Torquay United on another loan, this time agreeing a season-long deal. This loan spell was cut short after an ankle injury saw him return to Bournemouth in November. In August 2020, Vincent joined League Two side Scunthorpe United on a season-long loan deal. However, on 5 January 2021, he was recalled by Bournemouth. Two weeks later, he headed out on loan to League Two again, this time joining Walsall until the end of the season.

On 2 July 2021, Vincent joined National League club Notts County on a permanent transfer. On 20 August 2022, Vincent signed for fellow National League club Aldershot Town on a one-month loan deal. Having missed only one match against his parent club, Vincent's loan spell was extended for a further three months on 26 September. Following County's promotion at the end of the 2022–23 season, he was released.

On 30 June 2023, Vincent signed a two-year deal with National League club Dagenham & Redbridge. On 6 December 2024, Vincent joined fellow National League side, Woking on loan for the remainder of the 2024–25 campaign.

On 18 June 2025, it was announced that Vincent would join National League South side, Dorking Wanderers following his release from Dagenham & Redbridge.

== Career statistics ==
As of match played 27 October 2026

Appearances and goals by club, season and competition
Club	Season	League			FA Cup		EFL Cup		Other		Total	
Club	Season	Division	Apps	Goals	Apps	Goals	Apps	Goals	Apps	Goals	Apps	Goals
Torquay United (loan)	2018–19	National League South	13	0	—		—		—		13	0
Torquay United (loan)	2019–20	National League	19	0	2	0	—		—		21	0
Torquay United (loan)	Total		32	0	2	0	—		0	0	34	0
Scunthorpe United (loan)	2020–21	League Two	6	0	—		1	0	1 (Note: Appearances in the EFL Trophy)	0	8	0
Walsall (loan)	2020–21	League Two	8	0	—		—		—		8	0
Notts County	2021–22	National League	23	3	3	1	—		4 (Note: Appearance(s) in FA Trophy)	0	30	4
Notts County	2022–23	National League	9	1	0	0	—		0	0	9	1
Notts County	Total		32	4	3	1	—		4	0	39	5
Aldershot Town (loan)	2022–23	National League	18	1	1	0	—		1	0	20	1
Dagenham & Redbridge	2023–24	National League	32	2	1	0	—		1	0	34	2
Dagenham & Redbridge	2024–25	National League	19	0	2	0	—		3 (Note: Appearance(s) in National League Cup)	0	24	0
Dagenham & Redbridge	Total		51	2	3	0	—		4	0	58	2
Woking (loan)	2024–25	National League	13	1	—		—		3	0	16	1
Dorking Wanderers	2025–26	National League South	46	3	4	0	—		4 (Note: Two appearances in FA Trophy, two in National League South play-offs)	0	54	3
Dorking Wanderers	2026–27	National League South	8	0	3	0	—		0	0	11	0
Dorking Wanderers	Total		54	3	7	0	—		4	0	65	3
Career total			214	11	16	1	1	0	17	0	248	12

== Honours ==
Notts County

- National League play-offs: 2023
