= Kyle Cameron =

Association football player (born 1997)

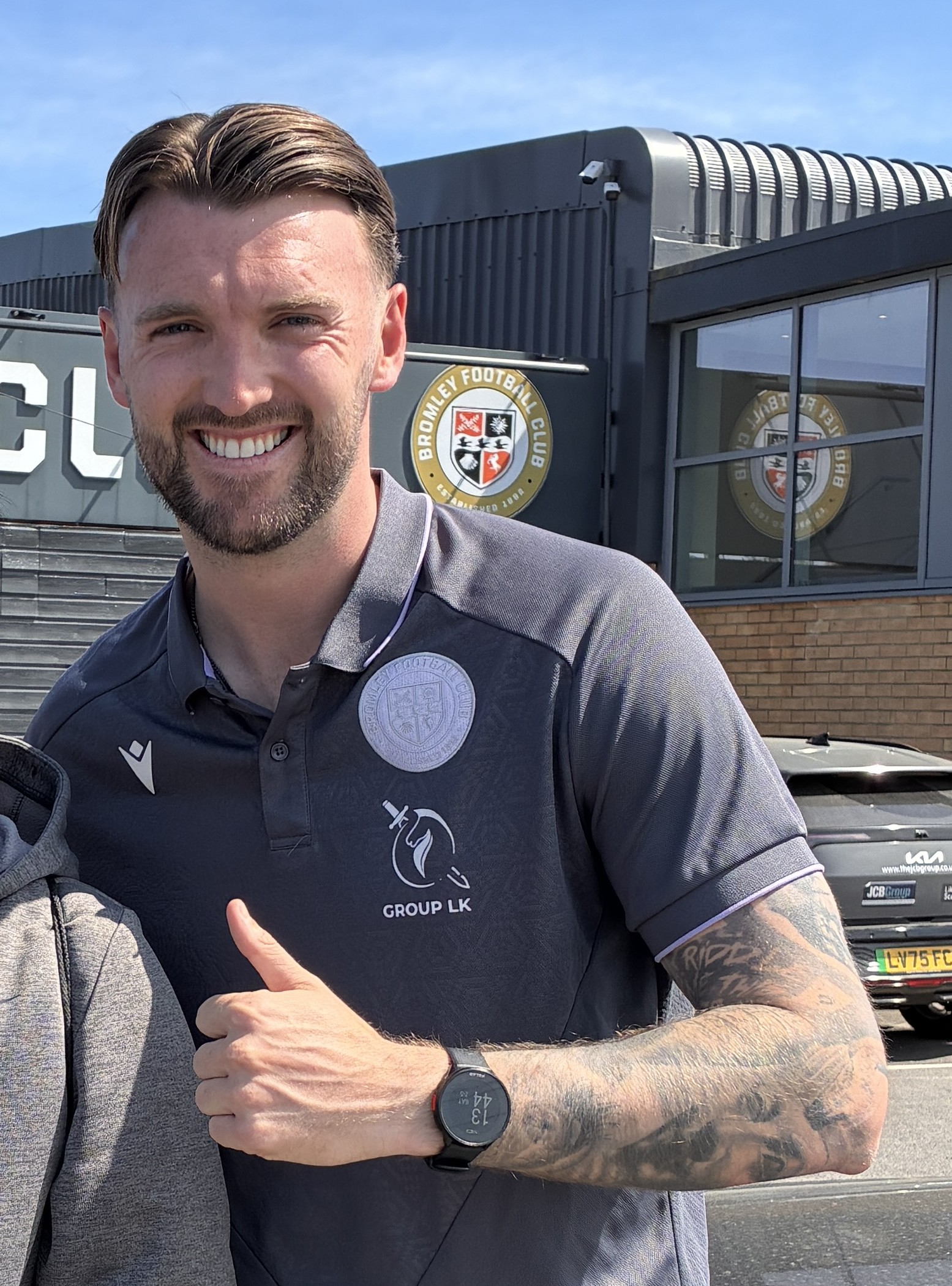
- Cameron in 2026

Personal information
- Full name: Kyle Milne Cameron
- Date of birth: 15 January 1997 (age 29)
- Place of birth: Hexham, England
- Height: 6 ft 3 in (1.90 m)
- Positions: Centre-back; left-back

Team information
- Current team: Newport County
- Number: 4

Youth career
- –2015: Newcastle United

Senior career*
Years	Team	Apps	(Gls)
2015–2018	Newcastle United	0	(0)
2015–2016	→ Workington (loan)	4	(1)
2016	→ York City (loan)	18	(1)
2016	→ Newport County (loan)	6	(0)
2018	→ Queen of the South (loan)	8	(0)
2018–2021	Torquay United	100	(7)
2021–2025	Notts County	117	(8)
2024–2025	→ St Johnstone (loan)	15	(0)
2025	→ Barrow (loan)	17	(1)
2025–2026	Bromley	18	(2)
2026–	Newport County	16	(1)

International career
2012–2013	England U16	6	(0)
2014	Scotland U17	7	(0)
2015–2016	Scotland U19	6	(0)
2016	Scotland U21	2	(0)
Medal record
Scotland
UEFA European U-17 Championship
Bronze medal – third place	2014 Malta	Team competition
- * Club domestic league appearances and goals as of 14:48, 21 November 2026 (UTC)

Kyle Milne Cameron (born 15 January 1997) is a professional footballer who plays as a centre-back or left-back for EFL League Two club Newport County. He is a former Scotland under 21 international.

== Early life ==
Born in Hexham, Northumberland, Cameron attended Bedlingtonshire Community High School while playing for Cramlington Juniors and Northburn.

== Club career ==
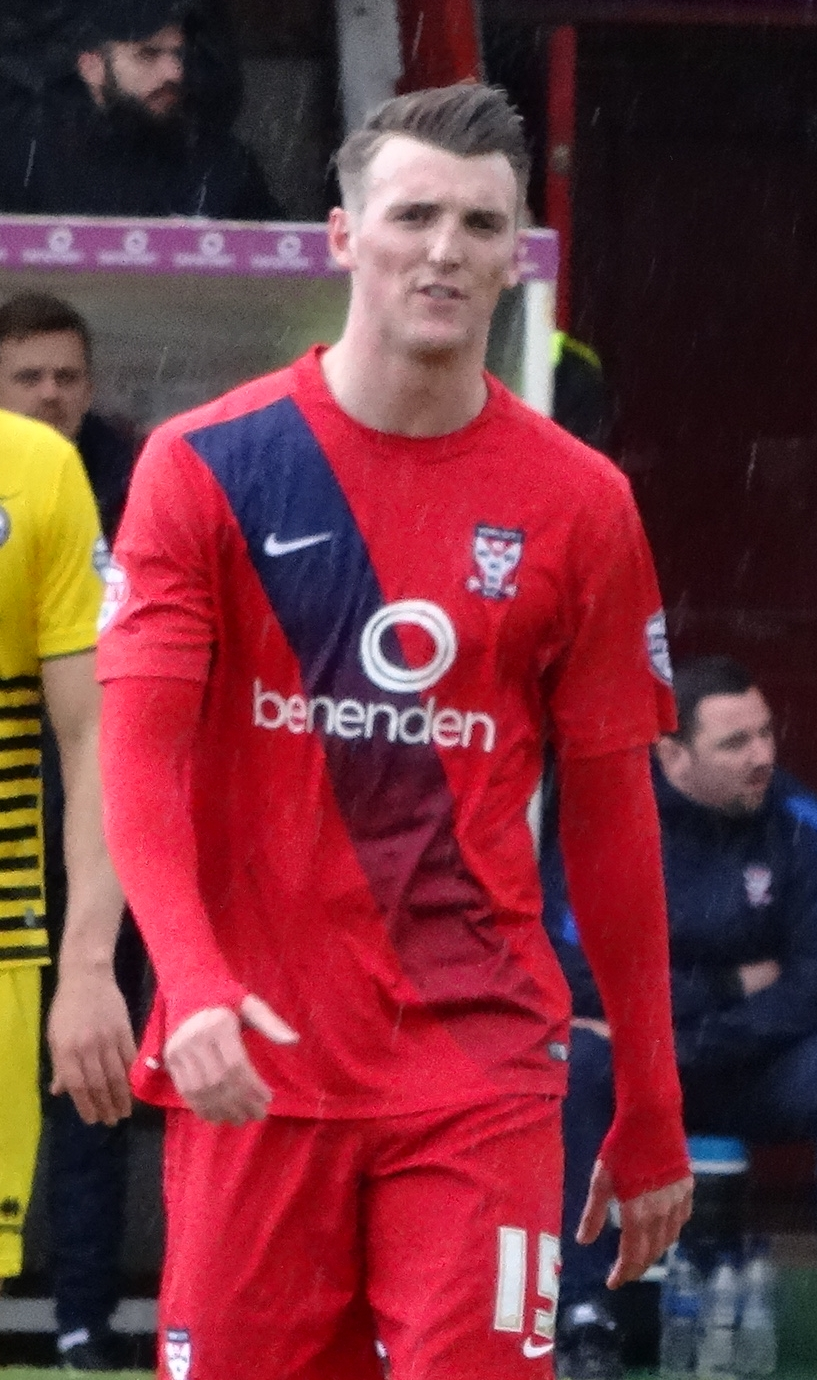
Cameron with York City in 2016

=== Newcastle United ===
Cameron started his career with Newcastle United at the age of nine and debuted for the under-18 team during the 2012–13 season whilst still a schoolboy. Cameron signed a scholarship with the club in June 2013. Cameron joined Workington of the Northern Premier League Premier Division on 10 December 2015 on a youth loan with his debut only five days later in a 2–1 away win versus Marine in which he scored in the third minute and was named man of the match. After playing on four occasions and scoring one goal for Workington, Cameron joined League Two club York City on 11 January 2016 on a one-month youth loan. Cameron debuted five days later in York's 1–0 home defeat to Newport County. Cameron's loan deal was then extended until the end of the 2015–16 season having impressed in his four starts for York.

On 31 August 2016, Cameron joined League Two club Newport County on loan until early January 2017. Cameron debuted for the Newport on 24 September 2016 in a league match versus Cambridge United. Cameron then returned to Newcastle earlier than planned on 30 December 2016 after picking up an injury.

On 18 January 2018, Cameron joined Scottish Championship club Queen of the South on loan until the end of the 2017–18 season. He was released by Newcastle at the end of 2017–18.

=== Torquay United and Notts County ===
Cameron signed for newly relegated National League South club Torquay United on 16 July 2018. He started for Torquay in the 2021 National League play-off final against Hartlepool United, having two goals disallowed in the final which was eventually lost on penalties.

Cameron signed for Torquay's National League rivals Notts County on 25 June 2021 on a two-year contract. Cameron captained Notts County to top of the league for the end of 2022, winning the December Player of the Month award. He also captained his side in the 2023 play-off final at Wembley Stadium as Notts won on penalties against Chesterfield to return to the Football League. At the end of the 2022–23 season, Cameron was named in the National League Team of the Year. On 16 June 2023, Cameron signed a new two-year contract with Notts County.

On 3 January 2025, having spent the first half of the season on loan with St Johnstone, Cameron was recalled and subsequently joined Barrow on loan for the remainder of the season.

On 20 May 2025, Notts County said the player would be released in June when his contract expired.

=== Bromley ===
On 24 June 2025, Cameron agreed to join League Two side Bromley at the expiration of his contract with Notts County.

=== Newport County ===
In June 2026 Cameron joined EFL League Two club Newport County on a permanent contract. He made his debut for Newport against Wimbledon on 8 August 2026 in the EFL Cup first round which Newport lost 5-4 on penalties after drawing 1-1 in normal time. Cameron scored his first goal for Newport in the 3-0 EFL League Two win against Rochdale on 15 August 2026, the opening day of the 2026-27 season.

== International career ==
Cameron represented the England national under-16 team in 2012 and 2013, earning six caps. Cameron then switched his allegiance to Scotland and played for the under-17s at the 2014 UEFA European Under-17 Championship and also the under-19s at the 2016 UEFA European Under-19 Championship. Cameron debuted for the under-21 team in a 2–0 defeat away to Iceland during the 2017 UEFA European Under-21 Championship qualification campaign.

== Career statistics ==
As of 21 November 2026

Appearances and goals by club, season and competition
Club	Season	League			National Cup (Note: Includes FA Cup, Scottish Cup)		League Cup (Note: Includes EFL Cup, Scottish League Cup)		Other		Total	
Club	Season	Division	Apps	Goals	Apps	Goals	Apps	Goals	Apps	Goals	Apps	Goals
Newcastle United	2015–16	Premier League	0	0	0	0	0	0	—		0	0
Newcastle United	2016–17	Championship	0	0	0	0	0	0	—		0	0
Newcastle United	2017–18	Premier League	0	0	0	0	0	0	—		0	0
Newcastle United	Total		0	0	0	0	0	0	—		0	0
Workington (loan)	2015–16	Northern Premier League Premier Division	4	1	0	0	—		—		4	1
York City (loan)	2015–16	League Two	18	1	0	0	0	0	0	0	18	1
Newport County (loan)	2016–17	League Two	6	0	2	0	0	0	0	0	8	0
Newcastle United U21	2017–18	—	—		—		—		3 (Note: Appearance(s) in EFL Trophy)	0	3	0
Queen of the South (loan)	2017–18	Scottish Championship	8	0	1	0	0	0	—		9	0
Torquay United	2018–19	National League South	39	1	4	0	—		2 (Note: Appearances in FA Trophy)	0	45	1
Torquay United	2019–20	National League	34	2	2	0	—		2	0	38	2
Torquay United	2020–21	National League	27	4	2	0	—		5 (Note: Three appearances in FA Trophy, two in National League play-offs)	0	34	3
Torquay United	Total		100	7	8	0	—		9	0	117	6
Notts County	2021–22	National League	27	4	2	0	—		3 (Note: Two appearances in FA Trophy, one in the National League play-offs)	0	32	4
Notts County	2022–23	National League	44	2	0	0	—		4 (Note: Two appearances in FA Trophy, two in National League play-offs)	0	48	2
Notts County	2023–24	League Two	43	1	0	0	1	0	3	0	47	1
Notts County	2024–25	League Two	0	0	0	0	0	0	0	0	0	0
Notts County	Total		114	7	2	0	1	0	10	0	127	7
St Johnstone (loan)	2024–25	Scottish Premiership	15	0	0	0	3	1	—		18	1
Barrow (loan)	2024–25	League Two	17	1	0	0	0	0	0	0	17	1
Bromley	2025–26	League Two	18	2	0	0	1	0	2	0	21	2
Newport County	2026–27	League Two	16	1	0	0	1	0	0	0	17	1
Career total			316	20	13	0	6	1	24	0	359	21

== Honours ==
Torquay United

- National League South: 2018–19

Notts County

- National League play-offs: 2023

Bromley

- EFL League Two: 2025–26

Individual

- National League South Team of the Year: 2018–19
- National League Team of the Year: 2022–23
- National League Player of the Month: December 2022
