= Rúben Rodrigues (footballer, born 1996) =

Portuguese footballer (born 1996)

Personal information
- Full name: Rúben da Rocha Rodrigues
- Date of birth: 2 August 1996 (age 30)
- Place of birth: Oliveira de Azeméis, Portugal
- Height: 1.81 m (5 ft 11 in)
- Positions: Midfielder; forward

Team information
- Current team: Bolton Wanderers
- Number: 20

Youth career
- 2005–2009: VV Boskant
- 2009–2012: Den Bosch
- 2012–2014: Wilhelmina Boys

Senior career*
Years	Team	Apps	(Gls)
2014–2017	Wilhelmina Boys		
2017–2018	Gemert		
2018–2020	Den Bosch	33	(12)
2019	→ De Treffers (loan)	17	(4)
2020–2023	Notts County	120	(48)
2023–2025	Oxford United	83	(13)
2025–2026	Vitória	4	(0)
2026–	Bolton Wanderers	17	(3)
- * Club domestic league appearances and goals as of 23:45, 27 September 2026 (UTC)

Rúben da Rocha Rodrigues (born 2 August 1996) is a Portuguese professional footballer who plays as a midfielder or a forward for EFL Championship club Bolton Wanderers.

== Club career ==
He played in the Netherlands at junior levels and started his career in the lower divisions.

On 27 December 2017, Den Bosch announced that Rodrigues would join the club for training immediately; he signed a professional contract from 1 July 2018. He had previously played for Den Bosch's junior squad.

He made his Eerste Divisie debut for Den Bosch on 17 August 2018 in a game against Volendam as a 61st-minute substitute for Stefano Beltrame. On 23 January 2019, Rodrigues was loaned out to De Treffers for the rest of the season.

On 7 August 2020, he signed for National League side Notts County. After scoring seven goals in the month, Rodrigues was awarded the league's Player of the Month award for May 2021, and at the end of the season he was voted Notts County's Fans' Player of the Season.

On 13 June 2023, Rodrigues signed with EFL League One side Oxford United. He scored his first goal for the club in a 3–0 home victory over Exeter City on 23 September, and went on to score 13 times in 95 matches in all competitions in two seasons with the club.

On 25 June 2025, Rodrigues joined Brazilian club Vitória for an undisclosed fee, signing a two-year contract.. However he only played 4 games there

On 30 January 2026, Rodrigues returned to England, joining League One club Bolton Wanderers on an initial eighteen-month contract, with the option for a further twelve months.

He would make his debut for Bolton on the 14th February 2026, coming on as a substitute in the 79th minute in a 1-1 draw away at Lincoln City. Having already made his debut for the Bolton Wanderers B team against Stoke City four days previously.

His first goal for Bolton would come on the 7th March 2026 at home to Wycombe Wanderers. Bolton found themselves 2-0 down at halftime, with Rodrigues being among a number of substitutions made by Bolton manager Steven Schumacher, in an attempt to change Bolton’s fortunes in the game. Rodrigues would score in the 88th minute, kickstarting a subsequent EFL record setting late comeback, with Bolton going on to score again twice in stoppage time to win 3-2. Rodgrigues scored twice in the League One playoff final on 24 May 2026, the opening goal in the 3rd minute and a penalty to complete a 4-1 win in stoppage time.

== Career statistics ==
As of match played 20 September 2026

Appearances and goals by club, season and competition
Club	Season	League			National cup (Note: Includes KNVB Cup, FA Cup)		League cup (Note: Includes EFL Cup)		Other		Total	
Club	Season	Division	Apps	Goals	Apps	Goals	Apps	Goals	Apps	Goals	Apps	Goals
FC Den Bosch	2018–19	Eerste Divisie	6	0	0	0	—		—		6	0
FC Den Bosch	2019–20	Eerste Divisie	27	12	1	0	—		—		28	12
FC Den Bosch	Total		33	12	1	0	—		—		34	12
De Treffers (loan)	2018–19	Tweede Divisie	17	4	—		—		—		17	4
Notts County	2019–20	National League	—		—		—		1 (Note: Appearance in the FA Trophy. Rodrigues signed for Notts County during the 2020–21 season but played in the FA Trophy for the preceding season since it had been paused and resumed due to the COVID-19 pandemic)	0	1	0
Notts County	2020–21	National League	35	11	0	0	—		6 (Note: Four appearances and one goal in the FA Trophy, two appearances and one goal in the National League play-offs)	2	41	13
Notts County	2021–22	National League	42	19	4	0	—		5 (Note: Four appearances and two goals in the FA Trophy, one appearance and one goal in the National League play-offs)	3	51	22
Notts County	2022–23	National League	36	16	1	0	—		0	0	37	16
Notts County	Total		113	46	5	0	—		12	5	130	51
Oxford United	2023–24	League One	44	9	3	0	1	0	6 (Note: Three appearances in League One play-offs, three appearances in EFL Trophy)	0	54	9
Oxford United	2024–25	Championship	39	4	0	0	2	0	—		41	4
Oxford United	Total		83	13	3	0	3	0	6	0	95	13
Vitória	2025	Brazilian Série A	4	0	0	0	0	0	0	0	4	0
Bolton Wanderers	2025–26	League One	12	2	0	0	0	0	3 (Note: Three appearances in League One play-offs)	2	15	4
Bolton Wanderers	2026–27	Championship	5	1	0	0	1	0	—		6	1
Bolton Wanderers	Total		17	3	0	0	1	0	3	2	21	5
Career total			267	78	9	0	4	0	21	7	301	85

== Honours ==
Notts County

- National League play-offs: 2023

Oxford United

- EFL League One play-offs: 2024

Bolton Wanderers

- EFL League One play-offs: 2026

Individual

- National League Player of the Month: May 2021
- Notts County Fans' Player of the Year: 2020–21
- National League Team of the Year: 2021–22, 2022–23
