= Cedwyn Scott =

English footballer

Personal information
- Full name: Cedwyn Scott
- Date of birth: 6 December 1998 (age 27)
- Place of birth: Hexham, England
- Height: 1.78 m (5 ft 10 in)
- Position: Forward

Team information
- Current team: South Shields
- Number: 19

Youth career
- 2014–2018: Huddersfield Town

Senior career*
Years	Team	Apps	(Gls)
2018–2019	Dundee	3	(0)
2018	→ Berwick Rangers (loan)	7	(3)
2019	→ Forfar Athletic (loan)	4	(0)
2019–2020	Dunston UTS	14	(5)
2020–2021	Hebburn Town	15	(16)
2021	Carlisle United	7	(0)
2021–2022	Gateshead	42	(24)
2022–2025	Notts County	55	(15)
2025	Carlisle United	11	(1)
2025–	South Shields	33	(17)
- * Club domestic league appearances and goals as of 21:04, 15 August 2026 (UTC)

Cedwyn Scott (born 6 December 1998) is an English professional footballer who plays as a forward for National League North side South Shields.

After beginning his career with the youth team of Huddersfield Town, he played in Scotland for Dundee, Berwick Rangers and Forfar Athletic, before returning to England where he played in non-League with Dunston UTS and Hebburn Town. He returned to professional football in January 2021 with Carlisle United, later playing for Notts County before returning to Carlisle.

== Career ==
Born in Hexham, Scott moved from Huddersfield Town to Scottish club Dundee in January 2018.

He made his senior debut for Dundee on 28 April 2018 and played three Scottish Premiership matches that year. Scott started the 2018–19 season on loan to Berwick Rangers, scoring four goals in eight games. In February 2019, it was announced that he had joined Forfar Athletic on loan until the end of the season.

At the end of the 2018–19 season, Scott was released by Dundee. During summer 2019, he had a trial at Darlington, playing in several pre-season games. He later signed for Dunston UTS. Scott signed for Hebburn Town on a free transfer in January 2020. In early November 2020, Scott was given a four-week trial at Newcastle United. During the trial, Scott will train with Newcastle's under-23 side but remain available to play for Hebburn. The trial was unsuccessful, and in December 2020 he went on trial with League Two club Carlisle United. He signed a short-term contract with Carlisle United in January 2021, until the end of the 2020–21 season.

He signed for Gateshead in May 2021, scoring twice on his debut against Kettering Town in the opening game of the season. Scott was awarded the National League North Player of the Month award for March 2022 after scoring four goals in five matches across the month to take his tally to 22 goals for the season.

In June 2022, Scott signed for Notts County for an undisclosed fee on a two-year deal. In May 2023, he scored County's winning goal in a penalty shoot-out win against Chesterfield in the National League play-offs final.

In October 2024, Scott was granted a leave of absence by Notts County to receive help for his mental health.

On 6 January 2025, Scott returned to former club Carlisle United on an eighteen-month contract for an undisclosed fee.

On 14 August 2025, Scott joined National League North club South Shields for an undisclosed fee.

== Career statistics ==
As of match played 24 January 2026

Appearances and goals by club, season and competition
Club	Season	League			National Cup		League Cup		Other		Total	
Club	Season	Division	Apps	Goals	Apps	Goals	Apps	Goals	Apps	Goals	Apps	Goals
Dundee	2017–18	Scottish Premiership	3	0	0	0	0	0	0	0	3	0
Dundee	2018–19	Scottish Premiership	0	0	0	0	0	0	0	0	0	0
Dundee	Total		3	0	0	0	0	0	0	0	3	0
Dundee U21s	2018–19	—			—		—		2 (Note: Appearances in the Scottish Challenge Cup.)	0	2	0
Berwick Rangers (loan)	2018–19	Scottish League Two	7	3	1	1	0	0	0	0	8	4
Forfar Athletic (loan)	2018–19	Scottish League One	4	0	0	0	0	0	0	0	4	0
Dunston UTS	2019–20	Northern Premier League; Division One North West	14	5	4	6	—		4 (Note: Two appearances in the FA Trophy; one appearance in the Northern Premier League Challenge Cup; and one appearance in the Durham Challenge Cup.)	0	22	11
Hebburn Town	2019–20	Northern League Division One	3	2	0	0	—		3 (Note: Appearances in the FA Vase. The concluding rounds of the 2019–20 FA Vase were delayed due to the COVID-19 pandemic - one appearance noted here took place early in the following season.)	2	6	4
Hebburn Town	2020–21	Northern League Division One	12	14	2	1	—		3 (Note: One appearance in the FA Vase and two appearances and seven goals in the Durham Challenge Cup.)	7	17	22
Hebburn Town	Total		15	16	2	1	—		6	9	23	26
Carlisle United	2020–21	League Two	7	0	0	0	0	0	0	0	7	0
Gateshead	2021–22	National League North	42	24	7	2	—		1 (Note: Appearance(s) in the FA Trophy.)	0	50	26
Notts County	2022–23	National League	36	15	0	0	—		3 (Note: One appearance in the FA Trophy, two appearances in National League play-offs.)	0	39	15
Notts County	2023–24	League Two	9	0	0	0	1	0	0	0	10	0
Notts County	2024–25	League Two	10	0	1	1	1	0	1	1	13	2
Notts County	Total		55	15	1	1	2	0	4	1	62	17
Carlisle United	2024–25	League Two	11	1	0	0	0	0	0	0	11	1
South Shields	2025–26	National League North	25	15	1	0	0	0	1	1	27	16
Career total			183	79	16	11	2	0	18	11	219	101

== Honours ==
Gateshead

- National League North: 2021–22

Notts County

- National League play-offs: 2023

Individual

- National League North Team of the Year: 2021–22
- National League North Player of the Month: March 2022
