= Aden Baldwin =

English footballer (born 1997)

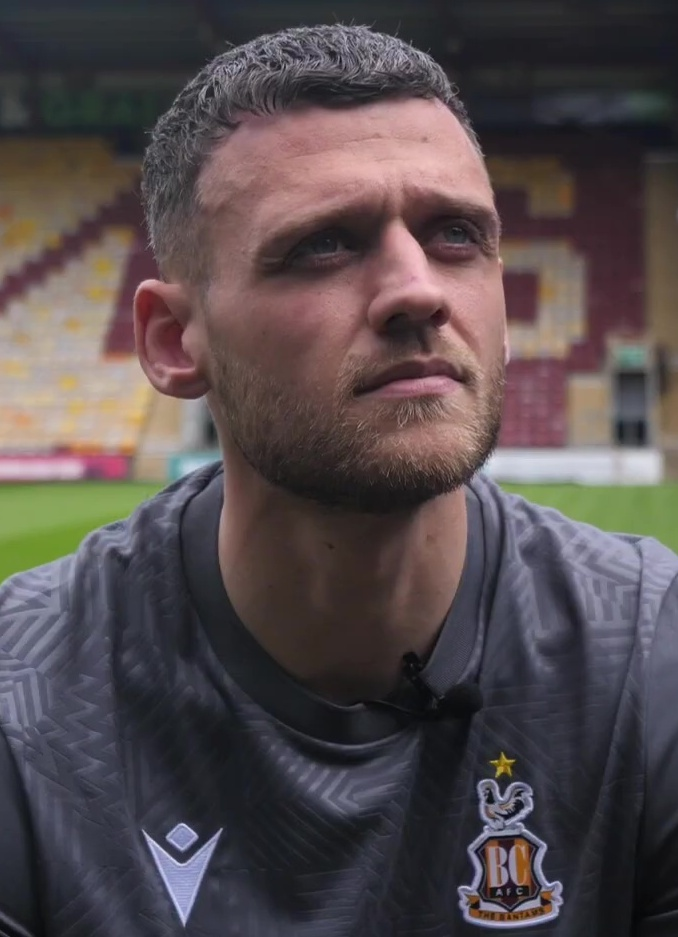
- Baldwin with Bradford City in 2024

Personal information
- Full name: Aden William James Baldwin
- Date of birth: 10 June 1997 (age 29)
- Place of birth: Gloucester, England
- Height: 1.83 m (6 ft 0 in)
- Position: Defender

Team information
- Current team: Bradford City
- Number: 15

Youth career
- 2012–2014: Forest Green Rovers

Senior career*
Years	Team	Apps	(Gls)
2014–2016	Forest Green Rovers	0	(0)
2015	→ Bath City (loan)	6	(1)
2016–2021	Bristol City	0	(0)
2016–2017	→ Weston-super-Mare (loan)	25	(2)
2017	→ Weston-super-Mare (loan)	11	(0)
2018–2019	→ Cheltenham Town (loan)	4	(0)
2020	→ Eastleigh (loan)	4	(0)
2021–2022	Milton Keynes Dons	9	(0)
2022–2024	Notts County	70	(1)
2024–	Bradford City	79	(3)
- * Club domestic league appearances and goals as of 13:14, 22 November 2026 (UTC)

Aden William James Baldwin (born 10 June 1997) is an English professional footballer who plays as a defender for EFL League One club Bradford City.

== Club career ==
=== Forest Green Rovers ===
Baldwin joined Forest Green Rovers as a 15-year-old and combined football with education at South Gloucestershire and Stroud College. He made his debut for Forest Green against Cheltenham Town in the Gloucestershire Senior Challenge Cup in April 2014 before signing a professional contract at the end of the 2014–15 season. On 20 August 2015, Baldwin joined National League South club Bath City on a one-month loan deal.

=== Bristol City ===
In January 2016, Baldwin signed for Championship side Bristol City on a two-and-a-half-year contract. On 12 October 2016, Baldwin joined National League South club Weston-super-Mare on a 93-day loan deal. He rejoined Weston-super-Mare on loan for a further two-month period ahead of the 2017–18 season.

In August 2018, he moved on loan to League Two club Cheltenham Town until January 2019. His loan spell was cut short after he suffered a serious knee injury which ruled him out for four months against Milton Keynes Dons in October 2018.

In February 2020, Baldwin signed a new contract with Bristol City until June 2021 with the option of a further year, and joined National League side Eastleigh on loan until the end of the season.

=== Milton Keynes Dons ===
On 13 July 2021, Baldwin joined League One side Milton Keynes Dons following his release from Bristol City. He made his debut for the club on 31 July 2021, in a 5–0 EFL Cup first round defeat away to Bournemouth. Having made 16 appearances for the club, Baldwin was later one of six players released at the end of the 2021–22 season.

=== Notts County ===
On 21 June 2022, Baldwin signed a two-year deal with National League club Notts County, effective from 1 July 2022. On 7 May 2023 he scored his first and second goals for the club in a 3–2 win over Boreham Wood in the National League play-off semi-final, and was described as a "big figure" in the club's promotion via the playoffs.

He was released by the club at the end of the 2023–24 season.

=== Bradford City ===
Following the expiry of his Notts County contract, in May 2024 it was announced that he would sign for Bradford City on 1 July 2024. Baldwin later praised Bradford manager Graham Alexander's transfer policy, as well as the club's team spirit and culture. He suffered a hamstring injury in August 2024, returning to training in November 2024. He made his first appearance following injury on 3 December 2024, appearing as a substitute. He later spoke about his friendship with Antoni Sarcevic who, like Baldwin, had joined Bradford City in the summer of 2024 but spent most of the start of the season injured. Baldwin was a regular in the Bradford City team in the second half of the season, as they pushed for promotion, although missed some matches towards the very end of the season due to illness. He also missed the last game of the season though suspension.

Ahead of the 2025–26 season, Baldwin missed pre-season due to injury. After re-establishing himself in the first-team, he was injured in late September 2025, and remained out-of-action into October. He returned to full training in mid-November, and to first-team play later that month, as the club suffered from injuries in his position. Baldwin scored his first goal for Bradford City, in his 55th appearance for the club, on 4 January 2026, the opener in a 2–1 victory away at Blackpool.

Baldwin was injured in February 2026 after breaking his nose, and in March was praised by manager Graham Alexander. He returned to play wearing a mask for his broken nose, and was defended by Alexander following a controversial red card in a match. The club's appeal was rejected, and Baldwin received a three-match ban. During his suspension, he underwent an operation on his broken nose. Upon his return to play, he said he was looking forward to the club's promotion push.

At the end of the 2025–26 season, the club triggered a clause in his contract to extend his deal for a further year. Baldwin missed large parts of the 2026–27 pre-season due to injury, but signed a new two-year contract with the club in July 2026.

He started the 2026–27 season by scoring 2 goals in the first 3 games, and was later described by local media as being "vital" for the team's defence.

== Career statistics ==
As of match played 21 November 2026

Appearances and goals by club, season and competition
Club	Season	League			FA Cup		EFL Cup		Other		Total	
Club	Season	Division	Apps	Goals	Apps	Goals	Apps	Goals	Apps	Goals	Apps	Goals
Forest Green Rovers	2013–14	Conference Premier	0	0	0	0	—		1 (Note: Appearance in Gloucestershire Senior Challenge Cup)	0	1	0
Forest Green Rovers	2014–15	Conference Premier	0	0	0	0	—		0	0	0	0
Forest Green Rovers	2015–16	National League	0	0	0	0	—		2 (Note: One appearance in FA Trophy, one appearance in Gloucestershire Senior Challenge Cup)	0	2	0
Forest Green Rovers	Total		0	0	0	0	—		3	0	3	0
Bath City (loan)	2015–16	National League South	6	1	0	0	—		0	0	6	1
Bristol City	2015–16	Championship	0	0	0	0	0	0	—		0	0
Bristol City	2016–17	Championship	0	0	0	0	0	0	—		0	0
Bristol City	2017–18	Championship	0	0	0	0	0	0	—		0	0
Bristol City	2018–19	Championship	0	0	0	0	0	0	—		0	0
Bristol City	2019–20	Championship	0	0	0	0	0	0	—		0	0
Bristol City	2020–21	Championship	0	0	0	0	0	0	—		0	0
Bristol City	Total		0	0	0	0	0	0	0	0	0	0
Weston-super-Mare (loan)	2016–17	National League South	25	2	0	0	—		4 (Note: Appearances in Somerset Premier Cup)	0	29	2
Weston-super-Mare (loan)	2017–18	National League South	11 (Note: Soccerway lists 10 league matches, Aylesbury United lists 11.)	0	1	0	—		0	0	12	0
Cheltenham Town (loan)	2018–19	League Two	4	0	0	0	1	0	0	0	5	0
Eastleigh (loan)	2019–20	National League	4	0	—		—		—		4	0
Milton Keynes Dons	2021–22	League One	9	0	2	0	1	0	4	0	16	0
Notts County	2022–23	National League	30	0	0	0	—		3 (Note: One appearance in the FA Trophy, two appearances and two goals in the play-offs.)	2	33	2
Notts County	2023–24	League Two	40	1	2	0	2	0	1 (Note: Appearance(s) in the EFL Trophy.)	0	45	1
Notts County	Total		70	1	2	0	2	0	4	2	78	3
Bradford City	2024–25	League Two	32	0	0	0	1	0	4	0	37	0
Bradford City	2025–26	League One	33	2	0	0	2	0	4 (Note: Two appearances in the EFL Trophy, two appearances in the play-offs)	0	39	2
Bradford City	2026–27	League One	14	1	1	0	3	1	0	0	18	2
Bradford City	Total		79	3	1	0	6	1	8	0	94	4
Career total			208	7	6	0	10	1	23	2	246	10

== Honours ==
Notts County

- National League play-offs: 2023
