= Sam Austin =

English footballer

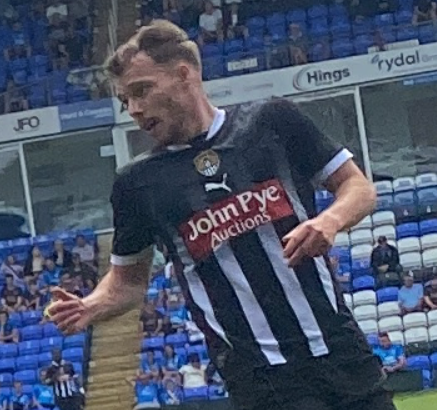

Personal information
- Full name: Samuel Joseph Austin
- Date of birth: 19 December 1996 (age 29)
- Place of birth: Stourbridge, England
- Height: 1.82 m (6 ft 0 in)
- Position: Midfielder

Team information
- Current team: Southend United
- Number: 10

Youth career
- –2014: Burton Albion

Senior career*
Years	Team	Apps	(Gls)
2014–2016	Burton Albion	1	(0)
2015–2016	→ AFC Telford United (loan)	5	(0)
2016	→ Leamington (loan)	19	(7)
2016–2022	Kidderminster Harriers	186	(18)
2022–2025	Notts County	104	(10)
2025–	Southend United	53	(8)
- * Club domestic league appearances and goals as of 24 September 2026 (UTC)

Samuel Joseph Austin (born 19 December 1996) is a footballer who plays as a midfielder for National League club Southend United.

== Career ==
Austin made his debut for Burton Albion in a 3–0 home defeat to Brighton & Hove Albion on 24 September 2013 in the League Cup. He made his League Two debut on 25 October 2014 in a 1–0 away defeat to Stevenage.

On Friday 20 November 2015, Austin joined National League North side AFC Telford United on loan until January 2016. He was released by Burton Albion at the end of the 2015–16 season.

Austin joined Kidderminster Harriers on a one-year deal ahead of the 2016-17 season, following his departure from Burton. He signed an 18-month extension in January 2018. Following the appointment of Russ Penn and Jimmy O'Connor, Austin began playing in more forward positions, as opposed to his typical position of right-back. In February 2022, Austin signed another extension, keeping him at Kidderminster until 2023. Austin was named in the National League North 2021-22 Team of the Season.

On 24 June 2022, Austin joined National League club Notts County for an undisclosed fee on a three-year deal, joining the club alongside Kidderminster teammate Geraldo Bajrami.

Austin signed for National League club Southend United on the 27th June 2025.

== Career statistics ==
As of match played 7 February 2026

Appearances and goals by club, season and competition
Club	Season	League			FA Cup		League Cup		Other		Total	
Club	Season	Division	Apps	Goals	Apps	Goals	Apps	Goals	Apps	Goals	Apps	Goals
Burton Albion	2014–15	League Two	1	0	0	0	1	0	0	0	2	0
Telford United (loan)	2015–16	National League North	5	0	0	0	—		1 (Note: Appearances in the FA Trophy)	0	6	0
Leamington (loan)	2015–16	SFL - Premier Division	19	7	0	0	—		2 (Note: Appearances in the Southern League Premier Division play-offs)	0	21	7
Kidderminster Harriers	2016–17	National League North	31	1	4	0	—		4	0	39	1
Kidderminster Harriers	2017–18	National League North	35	0	3	0	—		5	0	43	0
Kidderminster Harriers	2018–19	National League North	34	0	2	0	—		1	0	37	0
Kidderminster Harriers	2019–20	National League North	33	1	2	0	—		1	0	36	1
Kidderminster Harriers	2020–21	National League North	15	5	1	1	—		1	0	17	6
Kidderminster Harriers	2021–22	National League North	38	11	7	2	—		2	0	47	13
Kidderminster Harriers	Total		186	18	19	3	—		14	0	219	21
Notts County	2022–23	National League	41	5	1	2	—		4 (Note: Two appearances in FA Trophy) (Note: Two appearances in National League play-offs)	2	46	9
Notts County	2023–24	League Two	44	4	2	0	1	0	3 (Note: Appearance(s) in EFL Trophy)	0	50	4
Notts County	2024–25	League Two	23	1	1	0	1	1	3 (Note: Two appearances in EFL League Two play-offs, 1 appearance and 1 goal in EFL Trophy)	1	28	3
Notts County	Total		108	10	4	2	2	1	10	3	124	16
Southend United	2025–26	National League	28	3	0	0	–		1	1	29	4
Career total			347	38	23	5	3	1	28	4	401	48

== Honours ==
Notts County

- National League play-offs: 2023

Southend United

- FA Trophy: 2025–26

Individual

- National League North Team of the Year: 2021–22
