= Andrew Dallas (footballer) =

Scottish footballer (born 1999)

Personal information
- Full name: Andrew Robert Dallas
- Date of birth: 22 July 1999 (age 27)
- Place of birth: Glasgow, Scotland
- Height: 1.78 m (5 ft 10 in)
- Position: Forward

Team information
- Current team: Walsall
- Number: 9

Youth career
- –2018: Rangers

Senior career*
Years	Team	Apps	(Gls)
2018–2019	Rangers	0	(0)
2018	→ Stenhousemuir (loan)	6	(3)
2019	→ Greenock Morton (loan)	12	(0)
2019–2021	Cambridge United	23	(2)
2021	→ Weymouth (loan)	25	(12)
2021–2023	Solihull Moors	77	(32)
2023	→ Chesterfield (loan)	12	(6)
2023–2026	Barnsley	4	(1)
2023–2024	→ Kilmarnock (loan)	14	(0)
2024	→ Oldham Athletic (loan)	14	(0)
2024–2025	→ Barrow (loan)	18	(3)
2025	→ Morecambe (loan)	17	(3)
2025–2026	→ Southend United (loan)	42	(17)
2026–	Walsall	7	(1)
- * Club domestic league appearances and goals as of 07:30, 6 May 2026

Andrew Robert Dallas (born 22 July 1999) is a Scottish footballer who plays as a forward for EFL League Two club Walsall.

He came through the youth academy at Scottish Premiership side Rangers but failed to make a first team appearance, spending time on loan with Stenhousemuir and Greenock Morton. In 2019 he signed for Cambridge United. He got his break when manager Brian Stock took him on loan for National League side Weymouth, where he scored 12 goals in 25 appearances. In 2021 he joined Solihull Moors where he was part of the team that lost the 2022 National League play-off final. He later had a loan spell with Chesterfield where he went on to play in a second consecutive play-off final as his side were beaten once again in the 2023 National League play-off final.

== Career ==
=== Rangers ===
Dallas signed a professional contract with Rangers in June 2016, but had been within the club's youth system for several years.

Dallas joined Scottish League Two club Stenhousemuir on loan from Rangers in March 2018 and made his professional debut on 7 April, scoring twice in a 1–4 win over Edinburgh City. Dallas went on to help Stenhousemuir gain promotion to League 1.

Having returned to Rangers and appeared on the bench in some matchday squads without making a debut for the Glasgow club, on 21 January 2019 Dallas joined Scottish Championship side Greenock Morton on a loan deal until the end of the season.

=== Cambridge United ===
On 29 July 2019, Dallas signed for League Two club Cambridge United on a two-year deal for an undisclosed fee.

On 23 January 2021, Dallas joined National League side Weymouth on an initial one-month loan. On 17 February 2021, the loan was extended to the end of April 2021.

After scoring 12 goals in the National League with Weymouth on loan in the second half of the previous season, Dallas signed a new one-year deal with Cambridge United on 17 July 2021.

=== Solihull Moors ===
On 13 August 2021, Dallas signed for National League side Solihull Moors for an undisclosed fee, agreeing a two-year contract. On 22 January 2022, Dallas scored all five goals as Solihull defeated bottom side Dover Athletic 5–0. Dallas was awarded the National League Player of the Month award for January 2022 after ten goals in just four matches in all competitions.

Dallas played in the 2022 National League play-off final as Solihull were defeated 2–1 by Grimsby Town at the London Stadium missing the opportunity to earn promotion to the Football League.

On 30 January 2023, transfer deadline day a permanent move to Grimsby Town or Hartlepool United failed to materialise. On 7 March 2023, Solihull allowed Dallas to join National League rivals Chesterfield on loan for the remainder of the 2022–23 season.

For the second season in succession, Dallas was on the losing team in the National League play-off final as his Chesterfield side were defeated on penalties by Notts County following a 2-2 draw at Wembley Stadium. Dallas had opened the scoring in the 5th minute from the penalty spot.

Following the conclusion of his loan with Chesterfield, Solihull announced they were offering Dallas a new contract, with manager Neal Ardley stating "Dallo has been brilliant for us in the last two seasons in which he's been top goalscorer in both. He's always shown a fantastic attitude and we'll just have to see what he wants to do next season now.

=== Barnsley ===
On 24 July 2023, Dallas signed a three-year contract for EFL League One side Barnsley.

On 1 September 2023, Dallas joined Scottish Premiership club Kilmarnock on a season-long loan. In January 2024, he was recalled by Barnsley, before being sent on loan to National League club Oldham Athletic for the remainder of the season.

On 28 June 2024, Dallas joined League Two side Barrow on a season-long loan deal. His loan spell was cancelled by Barrow in January 2025. During his time at Holker Street, Dallas earned the nickname 'Big Tex', an ode to the 55-foot (17 m) tall figure and marketing icon of the annual State Fair of Texas held at Fair Park in Dallas, Texas; home of former chairman Paul Casson.

On 31 January 2025, Dallas returned to League Two on loan for the remainder of the season, joining Morecambe. He had been close to joining the club earlier in the transfer window, however they had been unable to complete a deal due to an ongoing transfer ban. He made his debut for the club the following day from his signing, scoring twice in a 4–2 victory over Fleetwood Town.

=== Walsall ===
On 17 June 2026, Dallas signed a two-year contract at EFL League Two club Walsall.

== Career statistics ==
As of end of 2025–26 season

Appearances and goals by club, season and competition
Club	Season	League			National Cup (Note: Includes appearances in FA Cup)		League Cup (Note: Includes appearances in EFL Cup)		Other		Total	
Club	Season	Division	Apps	Goals	Apps	Goals	Apps	Goals	Apps	Goals	Apps	Goals
Rangers U20	2016–17	—			—		—		2 (Note: Appearance(s) in Scottish Challenge Cup)	0	2	0
Rangers U20	2017–18	—			—		—		1	0	1	0
Rangers U20	2018–19	—			—		—		1	0	1	0
Rangers	2017–18	Scottish Premiership	0	0	0	0	0	0	0	0	0	0
Rangers	2018–19	Scottish Premiership	0	0	0	0	0	0	0	0	0	0
Rangers	Total		0	0	0	0	0	0	0	0	0	0
Stenhousemuir (loan)	2017–18	Scottish League Two	6	3	0	0	0	0	3 (Note: Appearances in the Scottish League One play-offs)	0	9	3
Greenock Morton (loan)	2018–19	Scottish Championship	12	0	0	0	0	0	—		12	0
Cambridge United	2019–20	EFL League Two	22	2	1	0	2	0	3 (Note: Appearances in EFL Trophy)	0	28	2
Cambridge United	2020–21	EFL League Two	1	0	1	0	0	0	3	0	5	0
Cambridge United	Total		23	2	2	0	2	0	6	0	33	2
Weymouth (loan)	2020–21	National League	25	12	0	0	—		0	0	25	12
Solihull Moors	2021–22	National League	43	19	2	0	—		6 (Note: Four appearances and three goals in FA Trophy, two appearances and one goal in National League play-offs)	4	51	23
Solihull Moors	2022–23	National League	34	13	2	1	—		1 (Note: Appearance in FA Trophy)	0	37	14
Solihull Moors	Total		77	32	4	1	—		7	4	88	37
Chesterfield (loan)	2022–23	National League	12	6	—		—		2 (Note: Appearances in National League play-offs)	1	14	7
Barnsley	2023-24	EFL League One	4	1	0	0	1	0	0	0	5	1
Barnsley	2024–25	EFL League One	0	0	0	0	0	0	0	0	0	0
Barnsley	Total		4	1	0	0	1	0	0	0	5	1
Kilmarnock (loan)	2023-24	Scottish Premiership	14	0	0	0	1	0	0	0	15	0
Oldham Athletic (loan)	2023–24	National League	14	0	—		—		—		14	0
Barrow (loan)	2024–25	EFL League Two	19	3	0	0	1	0	3	2	23	5
Morecambe (loan)	2024–25	EFL League Two	17	3	1	0	—		0	0	18	3
Southend United (loan)	2025–26	National League	42	17	1	0	—		2	0	45	17
Walsall	2026–27	EFL League Two	0	0	0	0	0	0	0	0	0	0
Career total			265	79	8	1	5	0	27	7	305	87

== Honours ==
Southend United

- FA Trophy: 2025–26
