= 2024–25 Notts County F.C. season =

161st season in existence of Notts County FC

Notts County
2024–25 season
- Owner: Alexander and Christoffer Reedtz
- Chairman: Christoffer Reedtz
- Head Coach: Stuart Maynard
- Stadium: Meadow Lane
- League Two: 6th
- FA Cup: Second round
- EFL Cup: First round
- EFL Trophy: Group stage
- Top goalscorer: League: Alassana Jatta (17); All: Alassana Jatta (17 goals)
- Highest home attendance: 14,747 v Gillingham (21 September 2024, League Two)
- Lowest home attendance: 9,408 v Newport County (22 August 2024, League Two)
- Average home league attendance: 10,550
- Biggest win: 4-1 v Grimsby Town (H) (22 August 2024, League Two)
- Biggest defeat: 4-3 v Peterborough United (A) (30 November 2024, FA Cup)
Home colours

The 2024–25 season is the 161st season in the history of Notts County Football Club and their second consecutive season in League Two. In addition to the domestic league, the club also participated in the FA Cup, the EFL Cup, and the EFL Trophy.

== Transfers ==
=== In ===
Date	Pos.	Player	From	Fee	Ref.
18 June 2024	GK	Alex Bass (ENG)	Sunderland (ENG)	Undisclosed	
24 June 2024	CB	Rod McDonald (ENG)	Harrogate Town (ENG)	Undisclosed	
1 July 2024 (Note: The transfer was announced on 11 June, and would become official on July 1 once his Morecambe contract expired)	CB	Jacob Bedeau (GRN)	Morecambe (ENG)	Free	
1 July 2024 (Note: The transfer was announced on 26 June, and would become official on July 1 once his Woking contract expired)	CM	Curtis Edwards (ENG)	Woking (ENG)	Free	
1 July 2024 (Note: The transfer was announced on 24 May, and would become official on July 1 once his Bradford City contract expired)	CB	Matthew Platt (ENG)	Bradford City (ENG)	Free	
1 July 2024 (Note: The transfer was announced on 19 June, and would become official on July 1 once his Crawley Town contract expired)	LM	Nick Tsaroulla (CYP)	Crawley Town (ENG)	Free	
12 July 2024	RM	Kellan Gordon (ENG)	Crawley Town (ENG)	Free	
26 July 2024	CB	Robbie Cundy (ENG)	Barnsley (ENG)	Free	
26 July 2024	CM	Jack Hinchy (ENG)	Brighton & Hove Albion (ENG)	Free	
9 August 2024	LM	Conor Grant (IRL)	Milton Keynes Dons (ENG)	Undisclosed	
22 August 2024	CB	Lucas Ness (ENG)	Charlton Athletic (ENG)	Undisclosed	
27 September 2024	LW	Josh Martin (ENG)	Portsmouth (ENG)	Free	
6 January 2025	CF	Will Jarvis (ENG)	Hull City (ENG)	Undisclosed	
13 January 2025	AM	Charlie Whitaker (ENG)	Everton (ENG)	Free	
3 February 2025	CF	Maï Traoré (GUI)	Fredrikstad (NOR)	Undisclosed	
20 February 2025	CB	Theo Robinson (WAL)	1874 Northwich (ENG)	Free	
31 March 2025	GK	Tyler Miller (USA)	DC United (USA)	Free	

=== Out ===
Date	Pos.	Player	To	Fee	Ref.
5 July 2024	GK	Tiernan Brooks (IRL)	Gateshead (ENG)	Undisclosed	
8 July 2024	CF	Macaulay Langstaff (ENG)	Millwall (ENG)	Undisclosed	
8 July 2024	LB	Lucien Mahovo (ENG)	Norwich City (ENG)	Undisclosed	
9 August 2024	RW	Aaron Nemane (FRA)	Milton Keynes Dons (ENG)	Undisclosed	
6 January 2025	CF	Cedwyn Scott (ENG)	Carlisle United (ENG)	Undisclosed	
14 January 2025	AM	Daniel Crowley (ENG)	Milton Keynes Dons (ENG)	Undisclosed	

=== Loaned in ===
Date	Pos.	Player	From	Date until	Ref.
30 August 2024	DM	George Abbott (ENG)	Tottenham Hotspur (ENG)	End of Season	
30 August 2024	SS	Jevani Brown (JAM)	Bristol Rovers (ENG)	18 January 2025 (Note: On 18 January, Brown was recalled to his parent club Bristol Rovers)	
13 January 2025	CB	Zak Johnson (ENG)	Sunderland (ENG)	End of Season	

=== Loaned out ===
Date	Pos.	Player	To	Date until	Ref.
5 July 2024	CB	Kyle Cameron (SCO)	St Johnstone (SCO)	3 January 2025 (Note: On 3 January, Cameron was recalled from his loan at St Johnstone and subsequently joined Barrow)	
26 July 2024	CF	Junior Morias (ENG)	Dagenham & Redbridge (ENG)	31 January 2025 (Note: On 3 January, Morias' loan at Dagenham was extended by a further month)	
24 September 2024	GK	Aidan Stone (ENG)	Boston United (ENG)	1 January 2025	
5 October 2024	LB	Adam Chicksen (ZIM)	Woking (ENG)	5 May 2025 (Note: On 2 January, Chicksen's loan at Woking was extended until May.)	
5 January 2025	CB	Kyle Cameron (SCO)	Barrow (ENG)	End of Season	
6 February 2025	CF	Junior Morias (ENG)	Woking (ENG)	18 March 2025 (Note: On 18 March, Morias was recalled from his loan at Woking)	
3 March 2025	CB	Robbie Cundy (ENG)	Solihull Moors (ENG)	End of Season (Note: On 1 April, Cundy's loan at Solihull was extended until the end of season)	

=== Released / Out of Contract ===
Date	Pos.	Player	Subsequent club	Join date	Ref.
30 June 2024	RB	Tobi Adebayo-Rowling (ENG)	Rochdale (ENG)	1 July 2024	
30 June 2024	CB	Geraldo Bajrami (ALB)	Burton Albion (ENG)	1 July 2024	
30 June 2024	CB	Aden Baldwin (ENG)	Bradford City (ENG)	1 July 2024	
30 June 2024	CB	Connell Rawlinson (WAL)	Chester (ENG)	2 July 2024	
30 June 2024	CB	Richard Brindley (ENG)	Eastleigh (ENG)	8 July 2024	
30 June 2024	CM	John Bostock (TRI)	Solihull Moors (ENG)	27 July 2024	
30 June 2024	LW	Luther Munakandafa (ZIM)	Spalding United (ENG)	12 October 2024	
30 June 2024	CM	Jim O'Brien (SCO)	Currently unattached		
11 July 2024	LW	Will Randall (ENG)	Ebbsfleet United (ENG)	7 September 2024	
18 January 2025	LW	Josh Martin (ENG)	Newport County (WAL)	22 January 2025	
30 January 2025	GK	Aidan Stone (ENG)	Yeovil Town (ENG)	3 February 2025	

== Pre-season and friendlies ==
Notts County announced pre-season friendlies against Alfreton Town, Wealdstone, York City, Boston United and a double header with Peterborough United. A seventh fixture was later confirmed, against MSV Duisburg.

Win Draw Loss Fixtures

9 July 2024 Friendly	Alfreton Town	2–2	Notts County	Alfreton
19:30 BST		Report	Trialist; Own goal	Stadium: North Street; Attendance: 893

13 July 2024 Friendly	Notts County	1–0	Wycombe Wanderers	Loughborough
12:30 BST	Trialist	Report		Stadium: Loughborough University; Attendance: 0 (behind-closed-doors)

16 July 2024 Friendly	Wealdstone	1–2	Notts County	Ruislip
19:30 BST	Ashford 76'	Report	Jatta 4', 22'	Stadium: Grosvenor Vale

20 July 2024 Friendly	MSV Duisburg	3–1	Notts County	Homberg, Germany
19:45 BST		Report	Platt	Stadium: PCC-Stadion

27 July 2024 Friendly	York City	2–2	Notts County	Huntington
15:00 BST	Chadwick 49'; Pearce 69'	Report	Jones 5'; Jatta	Stadium: York Community Stadium

30 July 2024 Friendly	Boston United	2–1	Notts County	Boston
19:30 BST	Osborne; Aderoju	Report	McGoldrick	Stadium: Boston Community Stadium

3 August 2024 Friendly	Peterborough United	1–0	Notts County	Peterborough
13:30 BST	Platt (o.g.)	Report		Stadium: London Road Stadium

3 August 2024 Friendly	Peterborough United	4–3	Notts County	Peterborough
15:30 BST	Rose; Mothersille (x2); Ajiboye	Report	McGoldrick 19', 64' (pen.); Edwards 79'	Stadium: London Road Stadium

== Competitions ==
=== League Two ===
==== League table ====
Pos	Team	Pld	W	D	L	GF	GA	GD	Pts	Promotion, qualification or relegation
4	Walsall	46	21	14	11	75	54	+21	77	Qualification for League Two play-offs
5	AFC Wimbledon (O, P)	46	20	13	13	56	35	+21	73	Qualification for League Two play-offs
6	Notts County	46	20	12	14	68	49	+19	72	Qualification for League Two play-offs
7	Chesterfield	46	19	13	14	73	54	+19	70	Qualification for League Two play-offs
8	Salford City	46	18	15	13	64	54	+10	69	

Source: EFL Official Website
Rules for classification: 1) Points; 2) Goal difference; 3) Number of goals scored; 4) Head-to-head results; 5) Wins; 6) Away goals; 7) Penalty points (sec 9.5); 8) 12-point sending off offences
(O) Play-off winners; (P) Promoted

==== Results summary ====
Overall								Home						Away					
Pld	W	D	L	GF	GA	GD	Pts	W	D	L	GF	GA	GD	W	D	L	GF	GA	GD
46	20	12	14	68	49	+19	72	10	5	8	31	21	+10	10	7	6	37	28	+9

Last updated: complete.
Source: Soccerway

==== Results by round ====
Round	1	2	3	4	5	6	7	8	9	10	11	12	13	14	15	16	17	18	20	21	22	23	24	25	27	28	29	30	31	32	19^{1}	33	34	35	36	26^{2}	37	38	39	40	41	42	43	44	45	46
Ground	A	H	H	A	H	A	H	A	A	H	A	H	A	H	A	A	H	A	A	H	A	A	H	H	A	H	H	A	H	A	H	H	A	H	A	A	H	H	A	H	A	H	A	H	A	H
Result	D	D	W	W	W	W	L	D	W	L	D	W	D	W	D	L	D	L	L	W	W	W	L	W	W	D	W	W	W	L	D	W	D	L	L	W	L	D	W	W	L	L	D	L	W	L
Position	13	16	9	7	2	1	4	4	2	5	3	4	3	3	3	6	4	6	11	7	7	3	7	6	6	6	3	3	2	4	4	4	4	4	5	4	5	6	5	4	6	6	6	6	5	6
Points	1	2	5	8	11	14	14	15	18	18	19	22	23	26	27	27	28	28	28	31	34	37	37	40	43	44	47	50	53	53	54	57	58	58	58	61	61	62	65	68	68	68	69	69	72	72

Source: EFL
A = Away; H = Home; W = Win; D = Draw; L = Loss; P = Postponed
Notes:
- ^{1} Matchday 19 (vs. Colchester United) was postponed due to spectator and player safety concerns.
- ^{2} Matchday 26 (vs. Grimsby Town) was postponed due to a frozen pitch.

==== Matches ====
On 26 June, the League Two fixtures were announced.

Win Draw Loss Fixtures

10 August 2024 1	Tranmere Rovers	0–0	Notts County	Birkenhead
15:00 BST	Davies (yellow card) 37'	Report	Macari (yellow card) 60'	Stadium: Prenton Park; Attendance: 8,198; Referee: Michael Barlow

18 August 2024 2	Notts County	2–2	Fleetwood Town	Nottingham
13:00 BST	Platt (yellow card) 23'; Jatta 57'; McGoldrick (yellow card) 90'; Jones 90+5' (pen.)	Report	Graydon 30' (yellow card) 75'; Sarpong-Wiredu 46'; Bonds (yellow card) 55'; Helm (yellow card) 61'; Odubeko (yellow card) 81'	Stadium: Meadow Lane; Attendance: 10,057; Referee: Thomas Parsons
Note: Fixture was initially scheduled for 17 August, but was moved due to home clashes with Nottingham Forest.

22 August 2024 3	Notts County	4–1	Grimsby Town	Nottingham
20:00 BST	Jatta 6', (yellow card) 65'; Crowley 15', 57'; Bedeau (yellow card) 29'; Jones 45+1'	Report	Rodgers 45+4'; Green (yellow card) 67'	Stadium: Meadow Lane; Attendance: 10,046; Referee: Ollie Yates
Note: Fixture was initially scheduled for 24 August, but was moved for live Sky Sports broadcast.

31 August 2024 4	Swindon Town	1–2	Notts County	Swindon
15:00 BST	Kilkenny 21'	Report	McGoldrick 30', 80', (yellow card) 69'	Stadium: County Ground; Attendance: 7,326; Referee: Dale Baines

7 September 2024 5	Notts County	2–0	Accrington Stanley	Nottingham
15:00 BST	McGoldrick 18', 67'	Report	Walton (yellow card) 16'; Awe (yellow card) 19'; Love (yellow card) 45+1'; Batty (yellow card) 63'; Quirk (yellow card) 65'; Whalley (yellow card) 86'	Stadium: Meadow Lane; Attendance: 10,147; Referee: Martin Woods

14 September 2024 6	Bromley	2–4	Notts County	Bromley
15:00 BST	Cheek 4' (yellow card) 90+4'; Thompson 6'; Leigh (yellow card) 71'		Jones 13' (pen.), 89' (yellow card) 45+1'; Crowley 47'; Jatta 56'	Stadium: Hayes Lane

21 September 2024 7	Notts County	0–1	Gillingham	Nottingham
15:00 BST	Abbott (yellow card) 3'; McGoldrick (yellow card) 83'; Bedeau (yellow card) 90+3'	Report	Clark (yellow card) 8'; Nevitt 38'; Clarke (yellow card) 44'; Ogie (yellow card) 62'; Ehmer (yellow card) 83'	Stadium: Meadow Lane; Attendance: 14,747; Referee: Lee Swabey

28 September 2024 8	Morecambe	1–1	Notts County	Morecambe
15:00 BST	Angol 2'; Tollitt (yellow card) 24'; Harrack (yellow card) 78' (yellow-red card) 90+1'; Lewis (yellow card) 90+5'	Report	Macari (yellow card) 69'; Platt 79'	Stadium: Mazuma Mobile Stadium; Attendance: 3,595; Referee: James Westgate

1 October 2024 9	Carlisle United	0–2	Notts County	Carlisle
19:45 BST	Vela (yellow card) 60'	Report	Jatta 10'; Platt (yellow card) 16'; Robertson 34'; Abbott (yellow card) 62'; Bedeau (yellow card) 82'	Stadium: Brunton Park; Attendance: 5,594; Referee: Zac Kennard-Kettle

5 October 2024 10	Notts County	0–1	Port Vale	Nottingham
15:00 BST	Platt (yellow card) 11'; Robertson (yellow card) 22'; Gordon (yellow card) 67'	Report	Tolaj 23'; Curtis (yellow card) 33'; Paton (yellow card) 54'; Hall (yellow card) 76'; Cover (yellow card) 77'	Stadium: Meadow Lane; Attendance: 11,974; Referee: Sam Purkiss

12 October 2024 11	Chesterfield	2–2	Notts County	Chesterfield
12:30 BST	Madden 6'; Metcalfe (yellow card) 64'; Grigg 74'; Banks (yellow card) 90'; Naylor (yellow card) 90+3'	Report	Jatta 14'; Palmer (yellow card) 55'; Macari (yellow card) 64'; Crowley (yellow card) 87'; McGoldrick (penalty missed) 90+4', 90+4'	Stadium: SMH Group Stadium; Referee: Matthew Corlett
Note: Fixture was initially scheduled for a 15:00 kick-off, but was moved for live Sky Sports broadcast.

19 October 2024 12	Notts County	1–0	AFC Wimbledon	Nottingham
15:00 BST	Macari (yellow card) 13'; Platt (yellow card) 64', (goal) 67'; Abbott (yellow card) 90+1'	Report	Harbottle (yellow card) 9'; Furlong (yellow card) 90'	Stadium: Meadow Lane; Attendance: 10,156; Referee: Geoff Eltringham

22 October 2024 13	Barrow	1–1	Notts County	Barrow-in-Furness
19:45 BST	Feely 7'; Gotts (yellow card) 37'; Kouyaté (yellow card) 60'; Jackson (yellow card) 90+1'	Report	McDonald (yellow card) 24'; Gordon (yellow card) 32'; Crowley (yellow card) 43'; Tsaroulla (yellow card) 84'; McGoldrick 90+3' (pen.)	Stadium: Holker Street; Attendance: 3,123; Referee: Andrew Kitchen

26 October 2024 14	Notts County	1–0	Harrogate Town	Nottingham
15:00 BST	Jatta 58'; Tsaroulla (yellow card) 88'	Report	Folarin (yellow card) 72'; Daly (yellow card) 83'	Stadium: Meadow Lane; Attendance: 9,427; Referee: Darren Drysdale

9 November 2024 15	Doncaster Rovers	1–1	Notts County	Doncaster
15:00 GMT	Ironside 73'	Report	Jatta 13'; Bedeau (yellow card) 80'; Tsaroulla (yellow card) 86'; Brown (yellow card) 90+3'	Stadium: Eco-Power Stadium; Attendance: 10,988; Referee: Tom Reeves

16 November 2024 16	Crewe Alexandra	2–0	Notts County	Crewe
15:00 GMT	Tracey 40', (yellow card) 80'; Holíček (yellow card) 57'; Cooney 62' (pen.), (yellow card) 64'; Williams (yellow card) 67'; Marschall (yellow card) 71'; Sanders (yellow card) 75'; Long (red card) 84'	Report	Bedeau (yellow card) 3'	Stadium: Gresty Road; Attendance: 6,127; Referee: Steven Copeland

23 November 2024 17	Notts County	0–0	Newport County	Nottingham
12:30 GMT		Report	K. Evans (yellow card) 70'; C. Evans (yellow card) 78'; Jephcott (yellow card) 90+4'	Stadium: Meadow Lane; Attendance: 9,408; Referee: Adam Herczeg
Note: Fixture was initially scheduled for a 15:00 kick-off, but was moved for live Sky Sports broadcast.

3 December 2024 18	Walsall	3–2	Notts County	Bescot
19:45 GMT	Barrett (yellow card) 49'; Allen 57'; Hall 64'; Simkin (yellow card) 79'; Lowe 86'	Report	McGoldrick 74' (pen.); Hinchy 90+4'	Stadium: Bescot Stadium; Attendance: 5,720; Referee: David Rock

14 December 2024 20	Salford City	3–0	Notts County	Kersal
12:30 GMT	McAleny 14'; Stockton 31', 54'; N'Mai (yellow card) 47'	Report	Bedeau (yellow card) 86'; Jatta (yellow card) 90+2'	Stadium: Moor Lane; Attendance: 2,768; Referee: Paul Howard
Note: Fixture was initially scheduled for a 15:00 kick-off, but was moved for live Sky Sports broadcast.

21 December 2024 21	Notts County	3–0	Bradford City	Nottingham
15:00 GMT	Jatta 28', 32'; McGoldrick 31'	Report	Kavanagh (yellow card) 42'; Sarcevic (yellow card) 61'	Stadium: Meadow Lane; Attendance: 11,500; Referee: James Durkin

26 December 2024 22	Milton Keynes Dons	0–2	Notts County	Denbigh
15:00 GMT	Kelly (yellow card) 9'; White (yellow card) 18'	Report	Austin (yellow card) 39'; Abbott 57'; Crowley 71'; Palmer (yellow card) 82'; Bass (yellow card) 87'	Stadium: Stadium MK; Attendance: 9,249; Referee: Scott Tallis

29 December 2024 23	Cheltenham Town	3–5	Notts County	Cheltenham
15:00 GMT	Stubbs 4'; Bowman 47'; Colwill 60'; Payne (yellow card) 78'	Report	Jatta 26', 90+3'; Palmer (yellow card) 28'; Martin 39'; Abbott 58'; Austin 62'; Hinchy (yellow card) 73'	Stadium: Whaddon Road; Attendance: 5,430; Referee: Andrew Humphries

1 January 2025 24	Notts County	1–2	Walsall	Nottingham
15:00 GMT	Jatta 26'; Platt (yellow card) 53'; Bedeau (yellow card) 90+6'	Report	Barrett (yellow card) 45'; Matt 65'; Lowe 82'	Stadium: Meadow Lane; Attendance: 4,610; Referee: Farai Hallam

4 January 2025 25	Notts County	2–0	Swindon Town	Nottingham
12:30 GMT	McGoldrick 17', 36'	Report	Kilkenny (yellow card) 29'; Delaney (yellow card) 58'; Clarke (yellow card) 82'; Wright (yellow card) 85'	Stadium: Meadow Lane; Attendance: 9,296; Referee: Sam Purkiss
Note: Fixture was initially scheduled for a 15:00 kick-off, but was moved for live Sky Sports broadcast.

18 January 2025 27	Accrington Stanley	0–3	Notts County	Accrington
15:00 GMT	Whalley (yellow card) 3'; Woods (yellow card) 9'; Coyle (yellow card) 35'	Report	Grant (yellow card) 6'; Abbott 16'; McGoldrick 27', 63'; Hinchy (yellow card) 90'	Stadium: Crown Ground; Attendance: 2,924; Referee: Simon Mather

25 January 2025 28	Notts County	1–1	Bromley	Nottingham
15:00 GMT	Platt (yellow card) 41'; Jones 56' (pen.); Hinchy (yellow card) 63'	Report	Thompson (yellow card) 29'; Congreve 80'	Stadium: Meadow Lane; Attendance: 9,947; Referee: Stephen Parkinson

28 January 2025 29	Notts County	1–0	Carlisle United	Nottingham
19:45 GMT	McDonald (yellow card) 14'; Jatta 19'; McGoldrick (yellow card) 86'	Report	Fusire (yellow card) 15'; McArthur (yellow card) 76'	Stadium: Meadow Lane; Attendance: 8,521; Referee: Abigail Byrne

1 February 2025 30	Gillingham	1–2	Notts County	Gillingham
12:30 GMT	Ogie (yellow card) 25'; Ehmer (yellow card) 45+1'; McKenzie (yellow card) 52'; Nevitt (yellow card) 59'; Gbode (yellow card) 60', (goal) 80'	Report	Tsaroulla 17'; McGoldrick 20'; Jones (yellow card) 44'; McDonald (yellow card) 60'; Jarvis (yellow card) 90+1'; Abbott (yellow card) 90+2'	Stadium: Priestfield Stadium; Attendance: 6,031; Referee: Tom Reeves
Note: Fixture was initially scheduled for a 15:00 kick-off, but was moved for live Sky Sports broadcasting.

8 February 2025 31	Notts County	2–0	Morecambe	Nottingham
15:00 GMT	Abbott (yellow card) 45+2'; Whitaker 56'; Jatta 75'	Report	Lewis (yellow card) 37'; Dallas (yellow card) 52'; Tutonda (yellow card) 69'; Cooke (yellow card) 69'; Taylor (yellow card) 90+1'	Stadium: Meadow Lane; Attendance: 9,909; Referee: Paul Marsden

13 February 2025 32	Port Vale	1–0	Notts County	Burslem
20:00 GMT	Curtis 85'	Report		Stadium: Vale Park; Referee: Ruebyn Ricardo
Note: Fixture was initially scheduled for 15 February, but was moved for live Sky Sports broadcasting.

18 February 2025 19	Notts County	1–1	Colchester United	Nottingham
19:45 GMT	Grant 3'; Cundy (yellow card) 76'	Report	Johnson 48' (o.g.); McDonnell (yellow card) 64'; Egbo (yellow card) 78'	Stadium: Meadow Lane; Attendance: 9,467; Referee: Scott Jackson
Note: Fixture was originally scheduled for 7 December, but was postponed due to spectator and player safety.

22 February 2025 33	Notts County	2–1	Tranmere Rovers	Nottingham
15:00 GMT	Whitaker 80'; Jatta 83', (yellow card) 84'; Bass (yellow card) 90+6'	Report	O'Connor (yellow card) 52'; Davies (yellow card) 66'; Dennis 88'; Turnbull (yellow card) 90+6'; Merrie (yellow card) 90+8'	Stadium: Meadow Lane; Attendance: 9,476; Referee: Jacob Miles

1 March 2025 34	Fleetwood Town	2–2	Notts County	Fleetwood
15:00 GMT	Cover (yellow card) 33'; Graydon (yellow card) 39', (goal) 68' (pen.), 70'	Report	Abbott 16', (yellow card) 90+7'; Tsaroulla (yellow card) 27'; Gordon (yellow card) 42'; Platt (yellow card) 64'; Jatta 90'; Whitaker (yellow card) 90+4'	Stadium: Highbury Stadium; Attendance: 3,555; Referee: Seb Stockbridge

4 March 2025 35	Notts County	1–2	Barrow	Nottingham
19:45 GMT	Macari (yellow card) 18'; Whitaker (yellow card) 60'; Grant 64'; Tsaroulla (yellow card) 69'	Report	Spence 10'; Foley 62'	Stadium: Meadow Lane; Attendance: 7,872; Referee: Michael Barlow

8 March 2025 36	AFC Wimbledon	2–0	Notts County	Wimbledon
12:30 GMT	Lewis 21'; Smith 35'; Bugiel (yellow card) 76'	Report	Palmer (yellow card) 70'	Stadium: Plough Lane; Attendance: 8,659; Referee: Thomas Kirk
Note: Fixture was initially scheduled for a 15:00 kick-off, but was moved for live Sky Sports broadcasting.

11 March 2025 26	Grimsby Town	0–2	Notts County	Cleethorpes
19:45 GMT		Report	Jatta 56'; McGoldrick 88'	Stadium: Blundell Park; Attendance: 6,270; Referee: Scott Oldham
Note: Fixture was initially scheduled for a 15:00 kick-off, but was moved for live Sky Sports broadcasting. The match was then postponed on that date due to a frozen pitch.

15 March 2025 37	Notts County	1–2	Chesterfield	Nottingham
15:00 GMT	Jarvis 81'	Report	Pepple 70'; Naylor 88'	Stadium: Meadow Lane; Attendance: 13,229; Referee: David Rock

22 March 2025 38	Notts County	0–0	Crewe Alexandra	Nottingham
12:30 GMT		Report		Stadium: Meadow Lane; Attendance: 10,225; Referee: Martin Woods
Note: Fixture was initially scheduled for a 15:00 kick-off, but was moved for live Sky Sports broadcasting.

29 March 2025 39	Newport County	0–2	Notts County	Newport
15:00 GMT		Report		Stadium: Rodney Parade

1 April 2025 40	Notts County	3–0	Milton Keynes Dons	Nottingham
15:00 BST	McGoldrick 47'; Palmer (yellow card) 52'; Tsaroulla 54'; Jarvis 74'; Edwards (yellow card) 87'	Report	Thompson-Sommers (yellow card) 34'; Gilbey (yellow card) 81'	Stadium: Meadow Lane; Attendance: 8,920; Referee: Alan Young

5 April 2025 41	Colchester United	1–0	Notts County	Colchester
15:00 BST	Simpson 44'; Egbo (yellow card) 86'; Iandolo (yellow card) 90+5'	Report	Platt (yellow card) 77'; Bedeau (yellow card) 82'; McGoldrick (yellow card) 90+5'	Stadium: Colchester Community Stadium; Attendance: 6,172; Referee: Josh Smith

11 April 2025 42	Notts County	1–3	Salford City	Nottingham
19:45 BST	McGoldrick 67'; Palmer (yellow card) 90+2'	Report	Platt 45+1' (o.g.); N'Mai 53'; Garbutt 77'	Stadium: Meadow Lane; Attendance: 9,643; Referee: Alex Chilowicz
Note: Fixture was initially scheduled for 12 April, but was moved due to home clashes with Nottingham Forest.

17 April 2025 43	Bradford City	1–1	Notts County	Bradford
20:00 BST	Kelly 53'; Halliday (yellow card) 75'; Pattison (yellow card) 85'	Report	Platt (yellow card) 32'; Palmer (yellow card) 45'; McDonald (yellow card) 52'; McGoldrick 69'	Stadium: Valley Parade; Attendance: 20,392; Referee: Farai Hallam
Note: Fixture was initially scheduled for 18 April, but was moved for live Sky Sports broadcasting.

21 April 2025 44	Notts County	1–2	Cheltenham Town	Nottingham
13:00 BST	Abbott (yellow card) 42'; Jatta 45+1', (yellow card) 45+2'	Report	Haynes (yellow card) 39'; Thomas 75'; Archer 89'; Jude-Boyd (yellow card) 90+2'	Stadium: Meadow Lane; Attendance: 10,642; Referee: James Durkin

26 April 2025 45	Harrogate Town	1–3	Notts County	Harrogate
13:00 BST	Muldoon 37'	Report	Abbott 33'; Grant 51', 76'	Stadium: Wetherby Road; Attendance: 4,136; Referee: Richie Watkins
Note: Fixture was initially scheduled for a 15:00 kick-off, but was moved at the request from North Yorkshire Police.

3 May 2025 46	Notts County	1–2	Doncaster Rovers	Nottingham
15:00 BST	Jatta 90+5'	Report	Street 18', 28', (yellow card) 44'	Stadium: Meadow Lane; Attendance: 15,427; Referee: Adam Herczeg

==== Play-offs ====
Notts County finished 6th, in the regular season and were drawn against 5th place AFC Wimbledon, first leg at home and then the second leg away.

10 May 2025 1st Leg	Notts County	0–1	AFC Wimbledon	Nottingham
20:00 BST	Macari (yellow card) 65'; Jatta (red card) 90+5'; Jones (yellow card) 90+5'	Report	Hippolyte (yellow card) 43'; Harbottle 59'; Neufville (yellow card) 64'; Tilley (yellow card) 76'; Bugiel (yellow card) 84'	Stadium: Meadow Lane; Attendance: 12,385; Referee: Thomas Kirk

16 May 2025 2nd Leg	AFC Wimbledon	1–0 (2–0 agg.)	Notts County	Wimbledon
20:00 BST	Neufville 8'; Harbottle (yellow card) 32'; Johnson (yellow card) 78'	Report	Macari (yellow card) 25'; Robertson (yellow card) 72'; Platt (yellow card) 90'	Stadium: Plough Lane; Attendance: 8,501; Referee: Lewis Smith

=== FA Cup ===
Notts County were drawn at home to Alfreton Town and away to Peterborough United in the second round.

Win Draw Loss Fixtures

1 November 2024 First round	Notts County	5–1	Alfreton Town	Nottingham
19:45 GMT	Platt 16'; Gordon (yellow card) 42'; Jatta 48', 62'; Palmer (yellow card) 74'; Brown 85' (pen.), 90'	Report	Whitehouse (yellow card) 11'; Waldock 14'; Cantrill (yellow card) 83'	Stadium: Meadow Lane; Attendance: 6,658; Referee: Scott Simpson

30 November 2024 Second round	Peterborough United	4–3	Notts County	Peterborough
15:00 GMT	Jones 10', 73'; Randall 77'; Odoh 87'	Report	Scott 13'; Platt 16'; Austin (yellow card) 80'; Abbott 90+6', (yellow card) 90+8'	Stadium: London Road Stadium; Referee: Ruebyn Ricardo

=== EFL Cup ===
On 27 June, the draw for the first round was made, with Notts County being drawn away against Shrewsbury Town.

Win Draw Loss Fixtures

13 August 2024 First round	Shrewsbury Town	3–3 (4–3 p)	Notts County	Shrewsbury
19:45 BST	Kayode 68'; Shipley 71', 84'; Hoole (yellow card) 87'; Rossiter (yellow card) 90+1'	Report	Grant 4'; Austin 23'; McGoldrick (yellow card) 81'; Jatta 89'	Stadium: New Meadow; Attendance: 2,914; Referee: Ben Speedie
	Penalties
	Shipley (penalty scored); Biggins (penalty missed); Lloyd (penalty scored); Bloxham (penalty scored); Benning (penalty scored)		(penalty missed) McGoldrick; (penalty scored) Crowley; (penalty missed) Edwards; (penalty scored) Scott; (penalty scored) Jatta

=== EFL Trophy ===
In the group stage, Notts County were drawn into Southern Group F alongside Burton Albion, Northampton Town and Leicester City U21.

Pos	Div	Team	Pld	W	PW	PL	L	GF	GA	GD	Pts	Qualification
1	L1	Burton Albion	3	2	0	0	1	9	5	+4	6	Advance to Round 2
2	L1	Northampton Town	3	2	0	0	1	7	5	+2	6	Advance to Round 2
3	L2	Notts County	3	2	0	0	1	3	3	0	6	
4	ACA	Leicester City U21	3	0	0	0	3	1	7	−6	0	

Source: EFL

Win Draw Loss Fixtures

24 September 2024 Group stage	Burton Albion	1–2	Notts County	Burton upon Trent
19:00 BST	Gilligan (yellow card) 18'; Whitfield 87'; Orsi (yellow card) 88'	Report	Gordon 29', (yellow card) 39'; Austin 54'; Cisse (yellow card) 58'	Stadium: Pirelli Stadium; Referee: Elliot Bell
Note: Fixture was initially scheduled for 3 September, but was pushed back three weeks.

8 October 2024 Group stage	Notts County	0–2	Northampton Town	Nottingham
19:00 BST	Reynolds (yellow card) 77'	Report	Fox 22'; Guinness-Walker (yellow card) 36'; Hondermarck (yellow card) 45+1'; McCarron 59'	Stadium: Meadow Lane; Attendance: 1,614; Referee: Farai Hallam

12 November 2024 Group stage	Notts County	1–0	Leicester City U21	Nottingham
19:00 GMT	Nyirenda (yellow card) 24'; Scott 31'; McDonald (yellow card) 70'; Adiefeh (yellow card) 76'	Report	Wormleighton (yellow card) 61'	Stadium: Meadow Lane; Attendance: 1,178; Referee: Gareth Rhodes

== Statistics ==
=== Appearances and goals ===
Players with no appearances are not included on the list
Italics indicate a loaned in player

No.	Pos	Nat	Player	Total		League Two		FA Cup		EFL Cup		EFL Trophy		League Two play-offs	
No.	Pos	Nat	Player	Apps	Goals	Apps	Goals	Apps	Goals	Apps	Goals	Apps	Goals	Apps	Goals
1	GK	(England) ENG	Alex Bass	43	0	39+0	0	2+0	0	0+0	0	0+0	0	2+0	0
2	DF	(England) ENG	Kellan Gordon	33	1	18+12	0	2+0	0	0+0	0	1+0	1	0+0	0
3	DF	(England) ENG	Rod McDonald	24	0	14+4	0	0+2	0	0+0	0	3+0	0	0+1	0
4	DF	(Grenada) GRN	Jacob Bedeau	49	0	43+1	0	2+0	0	1+0	0	0+0	0	2+0	0
5	DF	(England) ENG	Matthew Platt	50	4	45+0	2	2+0	2	0+1	0	0+0	0	2+0	0
6	MF	(England) ENG	Jack Hinchy	31	1	12+13	1	2+0	0	1+0	0	3+0	0	0+0	0
7	FW	(Guinea) GUI	Maï Traoré	14	0	2+10	0	0+0	0	0+0	0	0+0	0	1+1	0
8	MF	(England) ENG	Sam Austin	28	3	18+5	1	0+1	0	1+0	1	1+0	1	2+0	0
10	FW	(Malta) MLT	Jodi Jones	23	5	13+7	5	0+0	0	1+0	0	0+0	0	2+0	0
11	MF	(Republic of Ireland) IRL	Conor Grant	36	5	23+9	4	0+0	0	1+0	1	1+0	0	2+0	0
12	DF	(England) ENG	Lucas Ness	11	0	6+1	0	1+1	0	0+0	0	2+0	0	0+0	0
16	MF	(England) ENG	Charlie Whitaker	21	4	13+7	4	0+0	0	0+0	0	0+0	0	1+0	0
17	FW	(Republic of Ireland) IRL	David McGoldrick	37	17	28+7	17	0+0	0	1+0	0	0+0	0	1+0	0
18	MF	(England) ENG	Matt Palmer	47	0	39+4	0	2+0	0	0+0	0	0+0	0	2+0	0
20	MF	(Scotland) SCO	Scott Robertson	8	1	5+2	1	0+0	0	0+0	0	0+0	0	0+1	0
21	GK	(England) ENG	Sam Slocombe	12	0	7+1	0	0+0	0	1+0	0	3+0	0	0+0	0
22	MF	(England) ENG	Curtis Edwards	17	0	6+10	0	0+0	0	1+0	0	0+0	0	0+0	0
23	DF	(Zimbabwe) ZIM	Adam Chicksen	4	0	2+0	0	0+0	0	1+0	0	1+0	0	0+0	0
24	DF	(England) ENG	Robbie Cundy	11	0	2+5	0	0+1	0	1+0	0	2+0	0	0+0	0
25	MF	(Cyprus) CYP	Nick Tsaroulla	41	2	28+10	2	1+0	0	0+0	0	1+1	0	0+0	0
26	FW	(England) ENG	Junior Morias	1	0	0+0	0	0+0	0	0+0	0	0+0	0	0+1	0
27	DF	(England) ENG	Zak Johnson	10	0	5+5	0	0+0	0	0+0	0	0+0	0	0+0	0
28	DF	(Scotland) SCO	Lewis Macari	36	0	26+5	0	1+0	0	1+0	0	0+1	0	2+0	0
29	FW	(The Gambia) GAM	Alassana Jatta	43	22	38+1	19	2+0	2	0+1	1	0+0	0	1+0	0
33	MF	(England) ENG	George Abbott	44	6	37+3	5	2+0	1	0+0	0	0+0	0	2+0	0
36	FW	(England) ENG	Will Jarvis	23	2	7+14	2	0+0	0	0+0	0	0+0	0	0+2	0
40	MF	(England) ENG	Ryley Reynolds	4	0	0+0	0	0+1	0	0+0	0	3+0	0	0+0	0
41	DF	(Saint Kitts and Nevis) SKN	Kieran Cooney	1	0	0+0	0	0+0	0	0+0	0	0+1	0	0+0	0
42	FW	(England) ENG	Zac Denman	1	0	0+0	0	0+0	0	0+0	0	0+1	0	0+0	0
43	MF	(England) ENG	James Sanderson	2	0	0+0	0	0+0	0	0+0	0	0+2	0	0+0	0
44	MF	(Spain) ESP	Madou Cisse	7	0	1+1	0	0+1	0	0+1	0	2+1	0	0+0	0
45	MF	(England) ENG	Daniel Adiefeh	3	0	0+0	0	0+0	0	0+0	0	2+1	0	0+0	0
46	FW	(England) ENG	Charlie Gill	1	0	0+0	0	0+0	0	0+0	0	1+0	0	0+0	0
47	DF	(France) FRA	Cassius Cisse	2	0	0+0	0	0+0	0	0+0	0	0+2	0	0+0	0
48	MF	(England) ENG	Themba Nyirenda	2	0	0+0	0	0+0	0	0+0	0	1+1	0	0+0	0
49	MF	(England) ENG	Kameron Muir	4	0	0+0	0	0+1	0	0+0	0	0+3	0	0+0	0
50	DF	(England) ENG	Daniel Emmanuel	1	0	0+0	0	0+0	0	0+0	0	1+0	0	0+0	0
51	DF	(England) ENG	Archie Aves	1	0	0+0	0	0+0	0	0+0	0	0+1	0	0+0	0
Player(s) who featured whilst on loan but returned to parent club during the season:
14	FW	(Jamaica) JAM	Jevani Brown	18	2	4+10	0	1+1	2	0+0	0	2+0	0	0+0	0
Player(s) who featured but departed the club permanently during the season:
7	MF	(England) ENG	Daniel Crowley	19	4	18+0	4	0+0	0	0+1	0	0+0	0	0+0	0
9	FW	(England) ENG	Cedwyn Scott	13	2	3+7	0	1+0	1	0+1	0	1+0	1	0+0	0
19	FW	(England) ENG	Josh Martin	12	1	4+4	1	1+1	0	0+0	0	2+0	0	0+0	0
