= Oliver Tipton =

English footballer

Personal information
- Full name: Oliver Matthew Tipton
- Date of birth: 22 September 2003 (age 23)
- Place of birth: Wolverhampton, England
- Height: 1.85 m (6 ft 1 in)
- Positions: Defender; midfielder

Team information
- Current team: Kidderminster Harriers
- Number: 22

Youth career
- –2023: Wolverhampton Wanderers

Senior career*
Years	Team	Apps	(Gls)
2023–2024	Wolverhampton Wanderers	0	(0)
2023–2024	→ Notts County (loan)	7	(0)
2024–2026	Solihull Moors	74	(0)
2026–	Kidderminster Harriers	0	(0)
- * Club domestic league appearances and goals as of 25 June 2026

Oliver Tipton (born 22 September 2003) is an English footballer who plays as a defender or midfielder for National League club Kidderminster Harriers.

== Career ==
Tipton joined the academy of then-Championship club Wolverhampton Wanderers aged 11, signing a first professional contract in December 2020. Having captained both the under-18s and under-23s side, he signed a new two-year contract in March 2023.

On 28 July 2023, Tipton joined newly promoted League Two club Notts County on a season-long loan deal. He made his senior debut on 8 August, featuring as a substitute in a 2–0 EFL Cup defeat to Lincoln City. His loan was terminated on 2 January 2024 having only made seven appearances in all competitions.

On 2 July 2024, Tipton joined National League side Solihull Moors on a two-year deal.

On 25 June 2026, Tipton joined newly promoted National League club Kidderminster Harriers.

== Club statistics ==
As of match played 26 December 2023

Appearances and goals by club, season and competition
Club	Season	League			FA Cup		League Cup		Other		Total	
Club	Season	Division	Apps	Goals	Apps	Goals	Apps	Goals	Apps	Goals	Apps	Goals
Wolverhampton Wanderers U21	2021–22	—			—		—		1 (Note: Appearance(s) in EFL Trophy)	0	1	0
Wolverhampton Wanderers U21	2022–23	—			—		—		4	0	4	0
Wolverhampton Wanderers U21	Total				—		—		5	0	5	0
Notts County (loan)	2023–24	League Two	7	0	2	0	1	0	2	0	7	0
Career total			7	0	2	0	1	0	7	0	12	0
