= 2023–24 Notts County F.C. season =

160th season in existence of Notts County

Notts County
2023–24 season
- Owner: Alexander and Christoffer Reedtz
- Chairman: Christoffer Reedtz
- Head Coach: Luke Williams (until 5 January); Stuart Maynard (from 18 January)
- Stadium: Meadow Lane
- League Two: 14th
- FA Cup: Second round
- EFL Cup: First round
- EFL Trophy: Group stage
- Top goalscorer: League: Macaulay Langstaff (28); All: Macaulay Langstaff (29)
- Highest home attendance: 16,638 (14 October 2023 vs. Mansfield Town )
- Lowest home attendance: 9,846 (2 September 2023 vs. Accrington Stanley)
- Average home league attendance: 10,524
- Biggest win: 5–0 (29 December 2023 vs. Morecambe )
- Biggest defeat: 1–5 (5 August 2023 vs. Sutton United)
Home colours	Away colours
- All statistics correct as of 27 April 2024.

The 2023–24 season was the 160th season in the existence of Notts County and their first season back in League Two since the 2018–19 season following their promotion in the previous season. In addition to the league, the club also participated in the FA Cup, the EFL Cup, and the EFL Trophy.

== Current squad ==
As of 29 March 2024

No.	Name	Position	Nationality	Place of birth	Date of birth (age)	Previous club	Date signed	Fee	Contract end
Goalkeepers
1	Sam Slocombe	GK	(England)	Scunthorpe	5 June 1988 (age 38)	Bristol Rovers	1 August 2019	Free	30 June 2025
26	Aidan Stone	GK	(England)	Stafford	20 July 1999 (age 27)	Port Vale	23 June 2023	Free	30 June 2025
31	Luca Ashby-Hammond	GK	(England)	Kingston upon Thames	25 March 2001 (age 25)	Fulham	10 January 2024	Loan	31 May 2024
Defenders
2	Richard Brindley	RB	(England)	Norwich	5 May 1993 (age 33)	Bromley	5 September 2019	Free	30 June 2024
4	Kyle Cameron	CB	(Scotland)	(England) Hexham	15 January 1997 (age 29)	Torquay United	1 July 2021	Free	30 June 2025
5	Connell Rawlinson	CB	(Wales)	Wrexham	22 September 1991 (age 35)	Port Vale	5 August 2019	Free	30 June 2025
15	Aden Baldwin	CB	(England)		10 June 1997 (age 29)	Milton Keynes Dons	1 July 2022	Free	30 June 2024
21	Tobi Adebayo-Rowling	RB	(England)	Camden	16 November 1996 (age 29)	Ebbsfleet United	1 July 2022	Free	30 June 2024
23	Adam Chicksen	LB	(Zimbabwe)	(England) Milton Keynes	27 September 1991 (age 35)	Bolton Wanderers	10 September 2020	Free	30 June 2025
24	Geraldo Bajrami	CB	(Albania)	(England) Birmingham	24 September 1999 (age 27)	Kidderminster Harriers	1 July 2022	Free	30 June 2024
28	Lewis Macari	RB	(Scotland)		8 February 2002 (age 24)	Stoke City	1 January 2024	Free	30 June 2027
32	Jaden Warner	CB	(England)		28 October 2002 (age 24)	Norwich City	22 January 2024	Loan	31 May 2024
Midfielders
6	Jim O'Brien	CM	(Scotland)	Dumbarton	28 September 1987 (age 39)	Bradford City	8 January 2019	Free	30 June 2024
7	Daniel Crowley	AM	(England)	Coventry	3 August 1997 (age 29)	Morecambe	1 July 2023	Free	30 June 2025
8	Sam Austin	AM	(England)	Stourbridge	19 December 1996 (age 29)	Kidderminster Harriers	1 July 2022	Undisclosed	30 June 2025
16	John Bostock	CM	(Trinidad and Tobago)	(England) Camberwell	15 January 1992 (age 34)	Doncaster Rovers	7 December 2022	Free	30 June 2024
18	Matt Palmer	CM	(England)	Derby	27 February 1995 (age 31)	Swindon Town	21 July 2021	Free	30 June 2025
20	Scott Robertson	CM	(Scotland)	Lenzie	27 July 2001 (age 25)	Fleetwood Town	1 January 2024	Free	30 June 2025
42	Madou Cisse	CM	(Spain)			Academy	3 November 2023	Trainee	30 June 2024
43	James Sanderson	CM	(England)		30 November 2006 (age 19)	Academy	1 December 2023	Trainee	30 June 2026
44	Charlie Colkett	CM	(England)	Newham	4 September 1996 (age 30)	Crewe Alexandra	31 January 2024	Loan	31 May 2024
Forwards
9	Macaulay Langstaff	CF	(England)	Stockton-on-Tees	3 February 1997 (age 29)	Gateshead	1 July 2022	£45,000	30 June 2027
10	Jodi Jones	RW	(Malta)	(England) Bow	22 October 1997 (age 29)	Oxford United	1 July 2023	Free	30 June 2025
11	Aaron Nemane	RW	(France)	Amiens	26 September 1997 (age 29)	Torquay United	20 July 2021	Free	30 June 2025
14	Will Randall	LW	(England)	Swindon	2 May 1997 (age 29)	Sutton United	1 July 2023	Free	30 June 2025
17	David McGoldrick	CF	(Republic of Ireland)	(England) Nottingham	29 November 1987 (age 38)	Derby County	1 July 2023	Free	30 June 2025
19	Cedwyn Scott	CF	(England)	Hexham	6 December 1998 (age 27)	Gateshead	1 July 2022	Free	30 June 2024
27	Junior Morias	CF	(England)	(Jamaica) Kingston	4 July 1995 (age 31)	Dagenham & Redbridge	15 March 2023	Undisclosed	30 June 2026
29	Alassana Jatta	CF	(The Gambia)	Sukuta	12 January 1999 (age 27)	(Denmark) Viborg	1 February 2024	Undisclosed	30 June 2026
41	Charlie Gill	CF	(England)		15 September 2005 (age 21)	Academy	9 October 2023	Trainee	30 June 2024
Out on Loan
12	Tiernan Brooks	GK	(Republic of Ireland)	(England) Sheffield	17 June 2002 (age 24)	Academy	1 July 2021	Trainee	30 June 2025
22	Luther Munakandafa	CF	(Zimbabwe)		14 April 2004 (age 22)	Academy	1 July 2022	Trainee	30 June 2024
25	Lucien Mahovo	LB	(England)		7 June 2005 (age 21)	Sheffield United	1 July 2021	Free	30 June 2025

== Transfers ==
=== In ===
Date	Pos	Player	Transferred from	Fee	Ref
23 June 2023	GK	(England) Aidan Stone	(England) Port Vale	Free Transfer	
1 July 2023	AM	(England) Daniel Crowley	(England) Morecambe	Free Transfer	
1 July 2023	RW	(Malta) Jodi Jones	(England) Oxford United	Free Transfer	
1 July 2023	CF	(Republic of Ireland) David McGoldrick	(England) Derby County	Free Transfer	
1 July 2023	LW	(England) Will Randall	(England) Sutton United	Free Transfer	
6 November 2023	CM	(England) Dan Gosling	Free agent	—N/a	
1 January 2024	RB	(Scotland) Lewis Macari	(England) Stoke City	Free Transfer	
1 January 2024	CM	(Scotland) Scott Robertson	(England) Fleetwood Town	Free Transfer	
1 February 2024	CF	(The Gambia) Alassana Jatta	(Denmark) Viborg	Undisclosed	

=== Out ===
Date	Pos	Player	Transferred to	Fee	Ref
13 June 2023	CF	(Portugal) Rúben Rodrigues	(England) Oxford United	Rejected Contract	
30 June 2023	DM	(England) Ed Francis	Free agent	Released	
30 June 2023	CF	(Grenada) Kairo Mitchell	Free agent	Released	
30 June 2023	CM	(England) Frank Vincent	Free agent	Released	
6 January 2024	CM	(England) Dan Gosling	Free agent	Released	

=== Loaned in ===
Date	Pos	Player	Loaned from	Until	Ref
28 July 2023	CB	(England) Oliver Tipton	(England) Wolverhampton Wanderers	2 January 2024 (Note: On 2 January, Tipton was recalled back early from his parent club Wolves.)	
1 September 2023	RB	(Scotland) Lewis Macari	(England) Stoke City	1 January 2024	
10 January 2024	GK	(England) Luca Ashby-Hammond	(England) Fulham	End of Season	
22 January 2024	CB	(England) Jaden Warner	(England) Norwich City	End of Season	
31 January 2024	CM	(England) Charlie Colkett	(England) Crewe Alexandra	End of Season	

=== Loaned out ===
Date	Pos	Player	Loaned to	Until	Ref
7 July 2023	GK	(Republic of Ireland) Tiernan Brooks	(Republic of Ireland) Cork City	30 November 2023	
25 August 2023	CB	(England) Lucien Mahovo	(England) Long Eaton United	11 November 2023	
19 October 2023	LW	(Zimbabwe) Luther Munakandafa	(England) Rushall Olympic	18 November 2023	
18 January 2024	GK	(Republic of Ireland) Tiernan Brooks	(England) Rochdale	End of Season	
8 March 2024	LB	(England) Lucien Mahovo	(England) Boston United	End of Season	
28 March 2024	LW	(Zimbabwe) Luther Munakandafa	(England) Truro City	End of Season	

== Pre-season and friendlies ==
In May, Notts County announced their pre-season schedule with friendlies against Stoke City, Nottingham Forest, AFC Telford United, Boston United and Alfreton Town. On June 8, a further two friendlies were added against Nuneaton Borough and Shrewsbury Town.

Win Draw Loss Fixtures

4 July 2023 Friendly	Nuneaton Borough	0–3	Notts County	Nuneaton
19:45 BST		Report	Langstaff 25'; O'Brien 45'; Scott 69'	Stadium: Liberty Way; Attendance: 773

8 July 2023 Friendly	Notts County	1–5	Stoke City	Nottingham
15:00 BST	Langstaff 41'	Report	Sparrow 16'; Campbell 20', 37', 43'; Wright-Phillips 60'	Stadium: Meadow Lane

15 July 2023 Friendly	Notts County	0–1	Nottingham Forest	Nottingham
13:00 BST		Report	Hwang Ui-jo 46'	Stadium: Meadow Lane; Attendance: 16,163

18 July 2023 Friendly	AFC Telford United	0–2	Notts County	Wellington
19:00 BST		Report	Crowley 10'; Brindley 21'	Stadium: New Bucks Head

22 July 2023 Friendly	Boston United	0–1	Notts County	Boston
15:00 BST		Report	Scott 67'	Stadium: Boston Community Stadium; Attendance: 1,042

25 July 2023 Friendly	Alfreton Town	0–5	Notts County	Alfreton
19:30 BST		Report	Langstaff 33', 38', 45'; Scott 63'; McGoldrick 79'	Stadium: North Street

29 July 2023 Friendly	Shrewsbury Town	1–1	Notts County	Shrewsbury
15:00 BST	Udoh 13'	Report	McGoldrick 27'	Stadium: Meadow Lane

== Competitions ==
=== Overall record ===
Competition	Starting round	Final position	Record							
Competition	Starting round	Final position	Pld	W	D	L	GF	GA	GD	Win %
League Two	Matchday 1	14th	46	18	7	21	89	86	+3	39.13
FA Cup	First round	Second round	2	1	0	1	5	5	+0	50.00
EFL Cup	First round	First round	1	0	0	1	0	2	−2	0.00
EFL Trophy	Group stage	Group stage	3	0	0	3	2	6	−4	0.00
Total			52	19	7	26	96	99	−3	36.54

Source: Soccerway

=== League Two ===
==== League table ====
Pos	Team	Pld	W	D	L	GF	GA	GD	Pts
11	Walsall	46	18	11	17	69	73	−4	65
12	Gillingham	46	18	10	18	46	57	−11	64
13	Harrogate Town	46	17	12	17	60	69	−9	63
14	Notts County	46	18	7	21	89	86	+3	61
15	Morecambe	46	17	10	19	67	81	−14	58 (Note: On 11 April 2024, Morecambe were deducted three points for failing to pay players and staff on time following previous EFL rules breaches in the 2023–24 season.)
16	Tranmere Rovers	46	17	6	23	67	70	−3	57
17	Accrington Stanley	46	16	9	21	63	71	−8	57

Source: EFL Official Website
Rules for classification: 1) Points; 2) Goal difference; 3) Number of goals scored; 4) Head-to-head results; 5) Wins; 6) Away goals; 7) Penalty points (sec 9.5); 8) 12-point sending off offences

==== Results summary ====
Overall								Home						Away					
Pld	W	D	L	GF	GA	GD	Pts	W	D	L	GF	GA	GD	W	D	L	GF	GA	GD
46	18	7	21	89	86	+3	61	12	2	9	51	42	+9	6	5	12	38	44	−6

Source: Soccerway

==== Results by round ====
Round	1	2	3	4	5	6	7	8	9	10	11	12	13	14	15	16	17	18	19	20	21	22	23	24	25	26	28	30	31	32	33	34	35	27^{1}	37	38	39	36^{3}	40	41	42	43	44	29^{2}	45	46
Ground	A	H	A	A	H	H	A	A	H	A	H	A	H	A	H	H	A	H	A	H	H	A	A	H	H	A	A	H	A	H	A	A	H	H	H	A	A	A	H	A	H	H	A	H	H	A
Result	L	W	D	W	W	W	D	W	W	L	W	D	L	W	W	L	L	W	L	W	L	L	L	W	W	L	D	D	L	L	W	L	L	L	L	L	D	W	L	L	D	W	W	L	W	L
Position	24	15	15	9	4	1	2	2	1	1	1	1	2	2	2	2	5	3	6	6	6	6	6	5	5	5	6	7	7	10	7	9	13	14	15	17	17	13	14	16	16	15	14	14	14	14

Source: Soccerway
A = Away; H = Home; W = Win; D = Draw; L = Loss; P = Postponed
Notes:
- ^{1} Matchday 27 (vs Sutton United) was postponed due to FA Cup involvement.
- ^{2} Matchday 29 (vs Stockport County) was postponed due to a frozen pitch.
- ^{3} Matchday 36 (vs Bradford City) was postponed due to a waterlogged pitch.

==== Matches ====
On 22 June, the EFL League Two fixtures were released.

Win Draw Loss Fixtures

5 August 2023 1	Sutton United	5–1	Notts County	Sutton
15:00 BST	Kizzi 2'; Eastmond (yellow card) 5'; Milsom (yellow card) 6'; Patrick 23', 50'; Goodliffe (yellow card) 45+3'; Beautyman 63'; Smith 78'	Report	Langstaff (yellow card) 5'; Stone (red card) 15'; Bostock (yellow card) 37'; McGoldrick 69'; Baldwin (yellow card) 74'	Stadium: Gander Green Lane; Attendance: 4,010; Referee: Sam Purkiss

12 August 2023 2	Notts County	3–2	Grimsby Town	Nottingham
15:00 BST	Palmer (yellow card) 8'; Bostock 40'; Nemane (yellow card) 45+4'; Waterfall 50' (o.g.); Crowley 61'; Stone (yellow card) 90'; Adebayo-Rowling (yellow card) 90+4'	Report	Rose 17' (yellow card) 25'; Glennon (yellow card) 24'; Clifton (yellow card) 34' (goal) 45+7'; Conteh (yellow card) 64'	Stadium: Meadow Lane; Attendance: 12,950; Referee: Edward Duckworth

15 August 2023 3	Morecambe	0–0	Notts County	Morecambe
19:45 BST	Mayor (yellow card) 37'	Report	Baldwin (yellow card) 36'	Stadium: Mazuma Stadium; Attendance: 3,860; Referee: Scott Jackson

19 August 2023 4	Doncaster Rovers	1–3	Notts County	Doncaster
15:00 BST	Sotona 90+5'	Report	McGoldrick (yellow card) 16'; Jones (yellow card) 18' (goal) 54'; Bostock (yellow card) 21'; Langstaff 28', 46'	Stadium: Eco-Power Stadium; Attendance: 8,485; Referee: Ben Atkinson

26 August 2023 5	Notts County	2–1	Tranmere Rovers	Nottingham
15:00 BST	McGoldrick 12'; Crowley (yellow card) 56'; Palmer (yellow card) 60'; Rawlinson 65'; Cameron (yellow card) 90+8'	Report	Jolley (yellow card) 20'; Lewis (yellow card) 30'; Yarney (yellow card) 50'; Hawkes 88'	Stadium: Meadow Lane; Attendance: 10,174; Referee: Thomas Parsons

2 September 2023 6	Notts County	3–1	Accrington Stanley	Nottingham
15:00 BST	Crowley 7'; Jones (yellow card) 22'; Nemane (yellow card) 61'; Langstaff 65', 90'; Adebayo-Rowling (yellow card) 90+5'; Brindley (yellow card) 90+5'	Report	Andrews 27'; Leigh (yellow card) 74'; Conneely (yellow card) 86'	Stadium: Meadow Lane; Attendance: 9,846; Referee: Thomas Kirk

9 September 2023 7	Milton Keynes Dons	1–1	Notts County	Denbigh
15:00 BST	Harvie 46'; Smith (yellow card) 90+1'	Report	Cameron 66'	Stadium: Stadium MK; Attendance: 8,011; Referee: Chris Kavanagh

15 September 2023 8	Salford City	0–2	Notts County	Kersal
19:45 BST	Ingram (yellow card) 76'; McAleny (yellow card) 84'; Watt (yellow card) 86'; Berkoe (yellow card) 87' (yellow-red card) 90+3'	Report	McGoldrick 37'; Crowley 63' (yellow card) 68'; O'Brien (yellow card) 82'; Nemane (yellow card) 88' (yellow-red card) 90+1'	Stadium: Moor Lane; Attendance: 3,633; Referee: Scott Simpson

23 September 2023 9	Notts County	4–3	Forest Green Rovers	Nottingham
15:00 BST	Crowley 19'; Langstaff 37'; Cameron (yellow card) 43'; Bostock 65'; McGoldrick 68' (yellow card) 89'; Adebayo-Rowling (yellow card) 90+6'	Report	Brown (yellow card) 41'; Deeney 56', 61', 79' (pen.) (yellow card) 84'; Inniss (yellow card) 59'; McCann (yellow card) 60'; Lavinier (yellow card) 84'	Stadium: Meadow Lane; Attendance: 10,648; Referee: Seb Stockbridge

30 September 2023 10	Colchester United	5–4	Notts County	Colchester
15:00 BST	Chilvers 10'; Egbo (yellow card) 21'; Fevrier 31'; Read 38', 73'; McGeehan 58' (yellow card) 72' (yellow-red card) 79'; Tovide (yellow card) 68'; Goodman (yellow card) 75'	Report	McGoldrick (yellow card) 14'; Austin 21'; Baldwin (yellow card) 37'; Langstaff 48', 90+2'; Cameron (yellow card) 54'; Jones 67'	Stadium: Colchester Community Stadium; Attendance: 4,389; Referee: David Rock

3 October 2023 11	Notts County	3–1	Swindon Town	Nottingham
15:00 BST	McGoldrick 10'; Bostock (yellow card) 12'; Langstaff 35' (pen.); Crowley 37'; O'Brien (yellow card) 83'; Jones (yellow card) 90+1'	Report	Shade 49' (yellow card) 56'; Hepburn-Murphy (yellow card) 72'	Stadium: Meadow Lane; Attendance: 9,810; Referee: Darren Drysdale

7 October 2023 12	Barrow	1–1	Notts County	Barrow-in-Furness
15:00 BST	Feely (yellow card) 63'; Campbell 79' (pen.)	Report	McGoldrick 14' (pen.); Adebayo-Rowling (yellow card) 30'; Austin (yellow card) 81'; Brindley (yellow card) 90+2'	Stadium: Holker Street; Attendance: 4,122; Referee: Ben Toner

14 October 2023 13	Notts County	1–4	Mansfield Town	Nottingham
12:30 BST	Crowley 3'; McGoldrick (yellow card) 67'	Report	Reed 24'; Cargill (yellow card) 47' (goal) 70'; Flint 74'; Akins 81'	Stadium: Meadow Lane; Attendance: 16,638; Referee: Scott Oldham

21 October 2023 14	Gillingham	1–2	Notts County	Gillingham
15:00 BST	Malone 52' (yellow card) 52'; Lapslie (yellow card) 77'	Report	Langstaff 38'; Macari 78'; O'Brien (yellow card) 84'; Cameron (yellow card) 90+6'; McGoldrick (yellow card) 90+6'	Stadium: Priestfield Stadium; Attendance: 6,983; Referee: Alan Young

24 October 2023 15	Notts County	3–0	Newport County	Nottingham
	Crowley 24'; Langstaff 34'; Langstaff 54'			Stadium: Meadow Lane; Attendance: 8,095; Referee: Charles Breakspear

28 October 2023 16	Notts County	0–2	Wrexham	Nottingham
15:00 BST	Crowley (yellow card) 28'; Jones (yellow card) 37'	Report	Jones (yellow card) 7'; Mullin (yellow card) 37'; McClean (yellow card) 43'; Lee 73'; Palmer 76'	Stadium: Meadow Lane; Attendance: 16,083; Referee: Marc Edwards

11 November 2023 17	Crewe Alexandra	1–0	Notts County	Crewe
15:00 GMT	Offord (yellow card) 14'; Cooney (yellow card) 90+1'; Baker-Richardson 90+8' (pen.)	Report	Cameron (yellow card) 45+1'; Baldwin (yellow card) 50'; O'Brien (yellow card) 70'; Jones (yellow card) 88'; Randall (yellow card) 89'	Stadium: Gresty Road; Attendance: 5,663; Referee: Simon Mather

18 November 2023 18	Notts County	4–2	Bradford City	Nottingham
12:30 GMT	McGoldrick 5' (yellow card) 69'; Langstaff 36', 42'; Crowley 45+2'; Adebayo-Rowling (yellow card) 77'; Baldwin (yellow card) 90+3'	Report	Brindley 57' (o.g.); Walker 75'	Stadium: Meadow Lane; Attendance: 11,909; Referee: Tom Reeves

25 November 2023 19	AFC Wimbledon	4–2	Notts County	Wimbledon
15:00 GMT	Lewis (yellow card) 22'; Reeves 29' (pen.), 86' (pen.); Currie (yellow card) 38'; Al-Hamadi 41', 90+2'	Report	Jones (yellow card) 45+4'; Langstaff 62'; Nemane 67'	Stadium: Plough Lane; Attendance: 8,479; Referee: Adam Herczeg

28 November 2023 20	Notts County	3–1	Crawley Town	Nottingham
19:45 GMT	McGoldrick 20'; Macari (yellow card) 58'; O'Brien 61'; Morias 70'	Report	Campbell 10' (yellow card) 73'; Orsi (yellow card) 34'; Maguire (yellow card) 60'	Stadium: Meadow Lane; Attendance: 7,716; Referee: Scott Jackson

9 December 2023 21	Notts County	1–2	Walsall	Nottingham
15:00 GMT	Baldwin 32' (yellow card) 85'; Cameron (yellow card) 78'	Report	Smith (yellow card) 25'; McEntee 56' (yellow card) 63' (goal) 65'	Stadium: Meadow Lane; Attendance: 11,040; Referee: Dale Baines

16 December 2023 22	Harrogate Town	3–1	Notts County	Harrogate
15:00 GMT	Thomson 7'; Cornelius (yellow card) 26'; Odoh 32'; Ramsay (yellow card) 65'; Daly 68'	Report	O'Brien (yellow card) 51'; Chicksen (yellow card) 54'; Baldwin (yellow card) 57'; Jones 67'	Stadium: Wetherby Road; Attendance: 2,914; Referee: Scott Tallis

22 December 2023 23	Stockport County	2–1	Notts County	Edgeley
19:45 GMT	Wootton 7'; Croasdale (yellow card) 36'; Byrne (yellow card) 55'; Pye (yellow card) 56'; Richardson (yellow card) 84'; Madden 86' (pen.)	Report	Bostock (yellow card) 76'; Cameron (yellow card) 85'; McGoldrick 90+3'	Stadium: Edgeley Park; Attendance: 10,243; Referee: Seb Stockbridge

26 December 2023 24	Notts County	3–0	Doncaster Rovers	Nottingham
15:00 GMT	Crowley 33'; Langstaff 44'; Nemane 53'	Report	Ironside (penalty missed) 26'; Close (yellow card) 75'; Bailey (yellow card) 76'	Stadium: Meadow Lane; Attendance: 12,785; Referee: Lewis Smith

29 December 2023 25	Notts County	5–0	Morecambe	Nottingham
19:45 GMT	Langstaff 10' (pen.), 13', 36'; Brindley (yellow card) 17'; Crowley 24'; Jones 46'	Report	Taylor (yellow card) 38'; Mckiernan (yellow card) 66'	Stadium: Meadow Lane; Attendance: 9,786; Referee: Bobby Madley

1 January 2024 26	Tranmere Rovers	4–2	Notts County	Birkenhead
15:00 GMT	Morris 5'; Jennings 44', (penalty missed) 60', (yellow card) 72', (goal) 90+3' (pen.); Saunders 56'	Report	Nemane 24'; Langstaff 29'; Bostock (yellow card) 45+4'	Stadium: Prenton Park; Attendance: 2,828; Referee: Ollie Yates

13 January 2024 28	Grimsby Town	5–5	Notts County	Cleethorpes
15:00 GMT	Rose 7' (pen.); Eisa 15', 62'; Clifton 52' (yellow card) 87'; Wood 90+5'	Report	Baldwin (yellow card) 23'; McGoldrick 39', 90+2'; Langstaff 45+1'; Scott Robertson (yellow card) 45+4'; Nemane 60', 79'; Jones (yellow card) 84'	Stadium: Blundell Park; Attendance: 7,567; Referee: Craig Hicks

27 January 2024 30	Notts County	1–1	Barrow	Nottingham
15:00 GMT	Nemane 45+1'; Baldwin (yellow card) 79'	Report	Ray (yellow card) 20'; Spence 22'; Foley (yellow card) 24'; Campbell (yellow card) 70'; Stephenson (yellow card) 78'	Stadium: Meadow Lane; Attendance: 11,243; Referee: Alex Chilowicz

3 February 2024 31	Mansfield Town	1–0	Notts County	Mansfield
15:00 GMT	Keillor-Dunn 8' (yellow card) 50'; Clarke (yellow card) 59'; Flint (yellow card) 86'; Boateng (yellow card) 90+5'	Report		Stadium: Field Mill; Attendance: 8,667; Referee: Thomas Kirk

9 February 2024 32	Notts County	1–3	Gillingham	Nottingham
19:45 GMT	Crowley 13'; Bostock (yellow card) 45+3'; McGoldrick (yellow card) 88'	Report	Hawkins 19'; Clark 35'; Masterson 53'; Dieng (yellow card) 67'	Stadium: Meadow Lane; Referee: Scott Oldham

13 February 2024 33	Newport County	1–3	Notts County	Newport
19:45 GMT	Evans 90' (pen.)	Report	Langstaff 22', 59'; McGoldrick 35'	Stadium: Rodney Parade; Attendance: 4,426; Referee: Charles Breakspear

17 February 2024 34	Wrexham	1–0	Notts County	Wrexham
15:00 GMT	Fletcher 20'; Lee (yellow card) 55'	Report	McGoldrick (yellow card) 48'; Robertson (yellow card) 55'	Stadium: Racecourse Ground; Attendance: 12,532; Referee: Carl Brook

24 February 2024 35	Notts County	1–3	Crewe Alexandra	Nottingham
15:00 GMT	Ashby-Hammond (yellow card) 18'; Bostock (yellow card) 54'; Langstaff (yellow card) 81'; O'Brien 83'; Jatta (yellow card) 90'	Report	Demetriou 5', (yellow card) 53'; Nevitt 19' (pen.); Kirk (yellow card) 27'; Austerfield 77'; Turns (yellow card) 81'; Adebisi (yellow card) 88'	Stadium: Meadow Lane; Attendance: 11,470; Referee: Ross Joyce

27 February 2024 27	Notts County	3–4	Sutton United	Nottingham
19:45 GMT	Langstaff 13' (pen.); Crowley 33', 70'; O'Brien (yellow card) 68'	Report	Jackson 6'; Smith 16'; Adom-Malaki (yellow card) 22'; Goodliffe (yellow card) 31'; Lakin (yellow card) 51', (goal) 77' (pen.); Sanderson 64'; Hart (yellow card) 81'; Clay (yellow card) 90+3'	Stadium: Meadow Lane; Attendance: 7,776; Referee: Ollie Yates
Note: Fixture was originally scheduled for 6 January, but was postponed due to Sutton's FA Cup involvement.

9 March 2024 37	Notts County	0–2	AFC Wimbledon	Nottingham
15:00 GMT	O'Brien (yellow card) 24'; Cameron (yellow card) 60'	Report	O'Toole (yellow card) 15'; Tilley (yellow card) 20'; Reeves (yellow card) 33'; Bugiel (yellow card) 55'; Rawlinson 80' (o.g.); Balmer 85'	Stadium: Meadow Lane; Attendance: 10,224; Referee: Simon Mather

12 March 2024 38	Crawley Town	2–1	Notts County	Crawley
19:45 GMT	Gordon (yellow card) 12'; Mukena (yellow card) 49'; Forster (yellow card) 54'; Lolos (yellow card) 73' (goal) 79'; Maguire (yellow card) 86'	Report	Austin 20'; Slocombe (yellow card) 30'; O'Brien (yellow card) 51'; Robertson (yellow card) 66' (yellow-red card) 72'	Stadium: Broadfield Stadium; Attendance: 2,542; Referee: Keith Stroud

16 March 2024 39	Accrington Stanley	2–2	Notts County	Accrington
15:00 GMT	Whalley 17'; O'Brien (yellow card) 46'; Nolan 79' (pen.); Hills (yellow card) 90+6'	Report	O'Brien 4'; Jatta 45'; Baldwin (yellow card) 70'	Stadium: Crown Ground; Attendance: 2,499; Referee: Sunny Singh Gill

19 March 2024 36	Bradford City	0–3	Notts County	Bradford
19:45 GMT	Gilliead (yellow card) 36'; Halliday (yellow card) 56'; Smallwood (yellow card) 82'; Wright (yellow card) 90'; McDonald (yellow card) 90+3'		Langstaff 12'; Jatta 57' 90+4'; Nemane (yellow card) 90+1'	Stadium: Valley Parade; Referee: Ben Toner
Note: Fixture was originally scheduled for 2 March, but postponed due to a waterlogged pitch.

23 March 2024 40	Notts County	1–2	Salford City	Nottingham
15:00 GMT	Crowley 53'	Report	McAleny 31', 87', (yellow card) 80'; Mariappa (yellow card) 49'; Hendry (yellow card) 54'	Stadium: Meadow Lane; Attendance: 9,967; Referee: Adam Herczeg

29 March 2024 41	Swindon Town	2–1	Notts County	Swindon
15:00 GMT	Drinan 19'; Aguiar (yellow card) 23'; Kokolo (yellow card) 72'; Glatzel 73'; Blake-Tracy (yellow card) 90+1'	Report	Jatta 90+2'	Stadium: The County Ground; Attendance: 8,339; Referee: James Durkin

1 April 2024 42	Notts County	3–3	Milton Keynes Dons	Nottingham
15:00 BST	Austin 45+4'; Jatta 48'; Langstaff (yellow card) 58'; Nemane 90+1'; Robertson (yellow card) 90+6'	Report	Dean 19'; Bate (yellow card) 39'; Norman (yellow card) 39'; Harrison 64', 83'; Harvie (yellow card) 90+7'	Stadium: Meadow Lane; Attendance: 10,439; Referee: Scott Simpson

6 April 2024 43	Notts County	3–0	Harrogate Town	Nottingham
15:00 BST	Langstaff 45+2' (pen.); Cameron (yellow card) 48'; Baldwin (yellow card) 56'; Jones 75'; O'Brien (yellow card) 80' (goal) 89'	Report	Thomson (yellow card) 45+5' (penalty missed) 57'	Stadium: Meadow Lane; Attendance: 9,169; Referee: Jacob Miles

13 April 2024 44	Walsall	1–3	Notts County	Bescot
15:00 BST	Matt (yellow card) 40'; Comley (yellow card) 43' (yellow-red card) 59'; Tierney (yellow card) 61'; Faal 68'; Hutchinson (yellow card) 90+2'; Foulkes (yellow card) 90+7'	Report	Langstaff 2'; Nemane 28'; Bostock (yellow card) 53'; Austin 69'; Crowley (yellow card) 75'	Stadium: Bescot Stadium; Attendance: 6,576; Referee: Scott Tallis

16 April 2024 29	Notts County	2–5	Stockport County	Nottingham
19:45 BST	Crowley (yellow card) 32', (goal) 63'; Langstaff 61', (yellow card) 71'	Report	Madden 26', 33' (pen.), 40'; Bristow (yellow card) 36'; Sarcevic 50', (yellow card) 76'; Barry (penalty missed) 72'; Pye 84'	Stadium: Meadow Lane; Attendance: 11,656; Referee: Alex Chilowicz
Note: Fixture was originally scheduled for 20 January, but was postponed due to a frozen pitch.

20 April 2024 45	Notts County	1–0	Colchester United	Nottingham
15:00 BST	Langstaff 54'; Jones (yellow card) 89'	Report	Mingi (yellow card) 53'; Chilvers (yellow card) 90+2'; Read (yellow card) 90+4'	Stadium: Meadow Lane; Attendance: 11,037; Referee: Darren Drysdale

27 April 2024 46	Forest Green Rovers	1–0	Notts County	Nailsworth
15:00 BST	Osadebe (yellow card) 45'; McCann 74'	Report	Cameron (yellow card) 19'; Macari (yellow card) 70'	Stadium: The New Lawn; Attendance: 3610; Referee: Will Finnie

=== FA Cup ===
County were drawn at home to Crawley Town in the first round and to Shrewsbury Town in the second round.

Win Draw Loss Fixtures

4 November 2023 First Round	Notts County	3–2	Crawley Town	Nottingham
15:00 GMT	Crowley 13'; O'Brien (yellow card) 57'; McGoldrick 58'; Nemane (yellow card) 61'; Baldwin (yellow card) 70'; Langstaff 76'; Tipton (yellow card) 90+6'	Report	Orsi-Dadomo 3', 66'; Kelly (yellow card) 68'	Stadium: Meadow Lane; Attendance: 3,952; Referee: Peter Wright

1 December 2023 Second round	Notts County	2–3	Shrewsbury Town	Nottingham
19:45 GMT	Brindley 38'; Bostock (yellow card) 72'; Sanderson 75'	Report	Bowman 1', 49', 56'; Dunkley (yellow card) 16'; Maroši (yellow card) 86'	Stadium: Meadow Lane; Attendance: 4,551; Referee: Martin Woods

=== EFL Cup ===
Notts County were drawn at home to Lincoln City in the first round.

Win Draw Loss Fixtures

8 August 2023 First round	Notts County	0–2	Lincoln City	Nottingham
19:45 BST	Baldwin (yellow card) 29' (yellow-red card) 56'; O'Brien (yellow card) 44'	Report	Smith (yellow card) 15'; Roughan 23'; O'Connor (yellow card) 41'; Sørensen 48'	Stadium: Meadow Lane; Attendance: 6,468; Referee: Martin Woods

=== EFL Trophy ===
The Group stage draw was finalised on 22 June 2023.

Pos	Div	Team	Pld	W	PW	PL	L	GF	GA	GD	Pts	Qualification
1	L1	Derby County	3	3	0	0	0	8	2	+6	9	Advance to Round 2
2	L1	Lincoln City	3	2	0	0	1	4	2	+2	6	Advance to Round 2
3	ACA	Wolverhampton Wanderers U21	3	1	0	0	2	3	7	−4	3	
4	L2	Notts County	3	0	0	0	3	2	6	−4	0	

Updated to match(es) played on 8 November 2023. Source: EFL.com

Win Draw Loss Fixtures

12 September 2023 Group stage	Notts County	1–2	Wolverhampton Wanderers U21	Nottingham
19:45 BST	Munakandafa (yellow card) 44'; Hubner 90+5' (o.g.)		Hesketh 17' (Farmer); Jordão (yellow card) 45+3'; Birtwistle (yellow card) 48'; Fraser 55' (Farmer)	Stadium: Meadow Lane; Referee: Paul Howard

10 October 2023 Group stage	Notts County	1–2	Derby County	Nottingham
19:00 BST	Morias 78' (pen.); Gill (yellow card) 90+3'	Report	Sibley 20', 57' (yellow card) 83'; Forsyth (yellow card) 45+2'; Cashin (yellow card) 66'; Collins (yellow card) 78'	Stadium: Meadow Lane; Attendance: 5,946; Referee: Christopher Pollard

7 November 2023 Group stage	Lincoln City	2–0	Notts County	Lincoln
19:00 GMT	Burroughs 6'; O'Connor (yellow card) 45+1'; Vale 67'; Shodipo (yellow card) 88'	Report	Tipton (yellow card) 15'	Stadium: Sincil Bank; Attendance: 2,018; Referee: Aaron Jackson
