= Ryley Reynolds =

English footballer (born 2005)

Personal information
- Full name: Ryley John Stephen Reynolds
- Date of birth: 30 August 2005 (age 21)
- Place of birth: Birmingham, England
- Height: 1.80 m (5 ft 11 in)
- Position: Midfielder

Team information
- Current team: Grimsby Town
- Number: 11

Youth career
- –2023: Notts County

Senior career*
Years	Team	Apps	(Gls)
2023–	Notts County	0	(0)
2023	→ Long Eaton United (loan)	5	(1)
2024–2025	→ Kidderminster Harriers (loan)	27	(0)
2025–2026	→ Kidderminster Harriers (loan)	43	(10)
2026–	→ Grimsby Town (loan)	8	(0)
- * Club domestic league appearances and goals as of 13:53, 6 November 2026 (UTC)

Ryley John Stephen Reynolds (born 30 August 2005) is an English professional footballer who plays as a midfielder for EFL League Two club Grimsby Town on loan from EFL League One club Notts County.

== Career ==
=== Notts County ===
Reynolds played six games for Long Eaton United in the 2023–24 season, scoring one goal. He signed his first (two-year) professional contract with EFL League Two club Notts County in July 2024. He made his first-team debut on 24 September, in a 2–1 win at Burton Albion in the EFL Trophy.

==== Kidderminster Harriers (loans) ====
On 15 November 2024, he signed on a short-term loan for Kidderminster Harriers and made his debut in the FA Trophy second round against Halesowen Town. Kidderminster won 2–1. His loan was later extended until the end of the season.

On 5 August 2025, he returned to Kidderminster Harriers on a season-long loan.

==== Grimsby Town (loan) ====
Reynolds was sent on loan to EFL League Two club Grimsby Town on 14 August 2026 for the season.

Reynolds made his Grimsby debut the following day, replacing Justin Amaluzor in the 68th minute of a 1–0 home victory over Exeter City.

== Career statistics ==
As of match played 24 September 2024

Appearances and goals by club, season and competition
Club	Season	League			FA Cup		EFL Cup		Other		Total	
Club	Season	Division	Apps	Goals	Apps	Goals	Apps	Goals	Apps	Goals	Apps	Goals
Long Eaton United (loan)	2023–24	Southern League; Premier Division Central	5	1	1	0	0	0	0	0	6	1
Notts County	2024–25	EFL League Two	0	0	1	0	0	0	3 (Note: Appearance(s) in EFL Trophy)	0	4	0
Kidderminster Harriers (loan)	2024–25	National League North	27	0	0	0	0	0	1 (Note: Appearance(s) in National League North play-offs)	0	28	0
Kidderminster Harriers (loan)	2025–26	National League North	43	10	0	0	0	0	2	0	45	0
Kidderminster Harriers (loan)	Total		70	10	0	0	0	0	3	0	73	0
Grimsby Town	2025–26	EFL League Two	8	0	0	0	0	0	1	0	9	0
Career total			83	11	2	0	0	0	7	0	92	11

== Honours ==
Kidderminster Harriers

- National League North play-offs: 2026
