= James Sanderson (footballer) =

English footballer

Personal information
- Full name: James Keith Oliver Sanderson
- Date of birth: 30 November 2006 (age 19)
- Position: Midfielder

Team information
- Current team: Notts County
- Number: 43

Youth career
- Notts County

Senior career*
Years	Team	Apps	(Gls)
2023–2026	Notts County	2	(0)
- * Club domestic league appearances and goals as of 09:19, 20 July 2026

James Keith Oliver Sanderson (born 30 November 2006) is an English footballer who last played as a midfielder for EFL League One club Notts County.

== Career ==
Sanderson joined the Notts County Academy at under-8s level, before departing in order to play grassroots football before returning to the club, signing a scholarship deal in July 2023.

On 1 December 2023, the day after his seventeenth birthday, he was named in a senior matchday squad for the first time. He made his debut as a substitute that day in an FA Cup Second Round defeat to Shrewsbury Town, scoring with one of his first touches after entering the play. Sanderson's goal made him the second youngest goalscorer in Notts County's history, behind Mark Harbottle. On 26 December 2023, he made his league debut for the club.

== Career statistics ==
As of match played 8 October 2024

Appearances and goals by club, season and competition
Club	Season	League			FA Cup		League Cup		Other		Total	
Club	Season	Division	Apps	Goals	Apps	Goals	Apps	Goals	Apps	Goals	Apps	Goals
Notts County	2023–24	League Two	2	0	1	1	0	0	0	0	3	1
Notts County	2024–25	League Two	0	0	0	0	0	0	2 (Note: Appearances in the EFL Trophy)	0	2	0
Career total			2	0	1	1	0	0	2	0	5	1
