= Madou Cisse =

English footballer

Personal information
- Full name: Madou Cisse Kane
- Date of birth: 21 April 2005 (age 21)
- Position: Midfielder

Team information
- Current team: Quorn

Youth career
- –2023: Notts County

Senior career*
Years	Team	Apps	(Gls)
2022–2026	Notts County	3	(0)
2025–2026	→ Hereford (loan)	2	(0)
2026–	Quorn	8	(0)
- * Club domestic league appearances and goals as of 03:57, 9 September 2026 (UTC)

Madou Cisse Kane (born 21 April 2005) is a Spanish footballer who plays as a midfielder for Northern Premier League Premier Division club Quorn.

== Career ==
=== Notts County ===
Having progressed through the youth system at Notts County, he made his first-team debut in January 2023, coming off of the bench in an FA Trophy penalty defeat to Maidstone United. At the end of the 2022–23 season, Cisse signed a one-year contract, promotion back to the Football League allowing him to feature in the newly created Development Squad.

In October 2023, he made his League Two debut for the club from the bench in a 3–0 home victory over Newport County. He made his first league start for the club in December 2024, playing 55 minutes in a 3–2 loss to Walsall.

In July 2025, Cisse joined National League North club Hereford on a season-long loan.

He was released by Notts County upon the expiry of his contract at the end of the 2025–26 season.

=== Non-League ===
In July 2026, Cisse joined Northern Premier League Premier Division club Quorn.

== Personal life ==
Cisse was born in Spain to Senegalese parents.

== Career statistics ==
As of match played 4 September 2026

Appearances and goals by club, season and competition
Club	Season	League			FA Cup		EFL Cup		Other		Total	
Club	Season	Division	Apps	Goals	Apps	Goals	Apps	Goals	Apps	Goals	Apps	Goals
Notts County	2022–23	National League	0	0	0	0	—		1 (Note: Appearance in FA Trophy)	0	1	0
Notts County	2023–24	League Two	1	0	1	0	0	0	1 (Note: Appearance(s) in EFL Trophy)	0	3	0
Notts County	2024–25	League Two	2	0	1	0	1	0	3	0	7	0
Notts County	Total		3	0	2	0	1	0	5	0	11	0
Hereford (loan)	2025–26 (Note: As of 8 January 2026, Soccerbase erroneously cites Cisse as having appeared in Hereford's FA Trophy fixture against Radcliffe on 13 December 2025, with BBC Sport, Hereford Times and Hereford's official website not containing Cisse in the matchday squad)	National League North	2	0	1	0	—		0	0	3	0
Quorn	2026–27	NPL Premier Division	8	0	1	0	—		0	0	9	0
Career total			13	0	4	0	1	0	5	0	23	0
