= Alassana Jatta =

Gambian footballer (born 1999)

Personal information
- Full name: Alassana Jatta
- Date of birth: 12 January 1999 (age 27)
- Place of birth: Gunjur, The Gambia
- Height: 1.92 m (6 ft 4 in)
- Position: Forward

Team information
- Current team: Casa Pia

Youth career
- 2013–2014: Nema City
- 2014–2015: Gambia Ports Authority
- 2015–2016: Sukuta United

Senior career*
Years	Team	Apps	(Gls)
2016–2018	Real de Banjul	22	(18)
2019	Paide Linnameeskond	17	(13)
2019–2024	Viborg	95	(15)
2024–2026	Notts County	84	(40)
2026–	Casa Pia	0	(0)

International career^{‡}
2024–	Gambia	3	(0)
- * Club domestic league appearances and goals as of 11:03, 29 July 2025 (UTC) ‡ National team caps and goals as of 10:51, 25 July 2025 (UTC)

Alassana Jatta (born 12 January 1999) is a Gambian professional footballer who plays as a forward for Primeira Liga club Casa Pia and the Gambia national team.

== Club career ==
=== Paide Linnameeskond ===
Born in Sukuta, The Gambia, Jatta began playing for Real de Banjul in his home country before moving to Estonian Meistriliiga club Paide Linnameeskond in November 2018. In the first half of the season, Jatta scored 13 goals in 17 league games and was top goalscorer of the Meistriliiga.

=== Viborg ===
On 5 August 2019, Jatta signed a four-year contract with Danish 1st Division club Viborg FF. He made his debut for the club on 21 August, coming on as a substitute in the 64th minute for Emil Scheel and scoring his first goal in injury time.

Being part of the Viborg-team winning promotion to the Danish Superliga in the 2020–21 season, Jatta made his debut at the highest level on 18 July 2021, coming on as a substitute for Sofus Berger in a 2–1 away win over Nordsjælland.

In August 2022, Jatta and Viborg teammate Ibrahim Said were unable to travel to England for the club's UEFA Europa Conference League play-off against West Ham United due to English entry rules for non-EU citizens after Brexit.

=== Notts County ===
On 1 February 2024, Jatta joined English EFL League Two club Notts County for a fee around 150,000 euros.

=== Casa Pia ===
On 29 July 2026, Jatta joined Primeira Liga club Casa Pia for an undisclosed fee.

== International career ==
On 7 November 2024, Jatta received a first call-up for the Gambia national team for the upcoming 2025 Africa Cup of Nations qualification ties against Comoros and Tunisia.

== Career statistics ==
=== Club ===
As of match played on 25 May 2026

Appearances and goals by club, season and competition
Club	Season	League			National cup (Note: Includes Danish Cup, FA Cup)		League cup (Note: Includes EFL Cup)		Europe		Other		Total	
Club	Season	Division	Apps	Goals	Apps	Goals	Apps	Goals	Apps	Goals	Apps	Goals	Apps	Goals
Paide	2019	Meistriliiga	17	13	—		—		—		—		17	13
Viborg	2019–20	Danish 1st Division	24	7	—		—		—		—		24	7
Viborg	2020–21	Danish 1st Division	11	2	—		—		—		—		11	2
Viborg	2021–22	Danish Superliga	26	3	1	0	—		—		—		27	3
Viborg	2022–23	Danish Superliga	21	2	4	5	—		2 (Note: Appearances in UEFA Conference League)	1	—		27	8
Viborg	2023–24	Danish Superliga	13	1	1	0	—		—		—		14	1
Viborg	Total		95	15	6	5	—		2	1	—		103	21
Notts County	2023–24	League Two	10	5	—		—		—		—		10	5
Notts County	2024–25	League Two	40	19	2	2	1	1	—		—		43	22
Notts County	2025–26	League Two	34	16	1	1	0	0	—		1 (Note: Appearance in EFL Trophy)	0	36	17
Notts County	Total		84	40	3	3	1	1	—		1	0	89	44
Casa Pia	2026–27	Primeira Liga	0	0	0	0	—		—		—		0	0
Total			196	68	9	8	1	1	2	1	1	0	209	78

=== International ===
As of match played 24 March 2025

Appearances and goals by national team and year
National team	Year	Apps	Goals
Gambia	2024	1	0
Gambia	2025	2	0
Gambia	2026	0	0
Total		3	0

== Honours ==
Viborg

- Danish 1st Division: 2020–21

Notts County

- EFL League Two play-offs: 2026

Individual

- Meistriliiga Player of the Month: June 2019
- EFL League Two Team of the Season: 2024–25
- PFA Team of the Year: 2024–25 League Two
