= Lewis Macari =

Scottish footballer (born 2002)

Personal information
- Full name: Lewis Jon Macari
- Date of birth: 8 February 2002 (age 24)
- Height: 1.83 m (6 ft 0 in)
- Position: Defender

Team information
- Current team: Notts County
- Number: 28

Youth career
- Stoke City

Senior career*
Years	Team	Apps	(Gls)
2018–2023	Stoke City	0	(0)
2019	→ Market Drayton Town (loan)	4	(0)
2022	→ Dundalk (loan)	20	(0)
2022	→ Dundalk (loan)	14	(1)
2023	→ Notts County (loan)	7	(1)
2023–	Notts County	81	(0)

International career
2019	Scotland U18	1	(0)
- * Club domestic league appearances and goals as of 16:44, 25 April 2026 (UTC)

Lewis Jon Macari (born 8 February 2002) is a Scottish professional footballer who plays as a defender for EFL League One club Notts County.

== Club career ==
Macari began his career with Stoke City, spending time on loan at Market Drayton Town, before moving on loan to Irish club Dundalk in February 2022. He returned to Stoke in May, before the loan deal was extended until November, the final month of Dundalk's season. He scored his first goal for the club in a 2–1 win over Finn Harps in October.

He made his debut for Stoke City on 8 January 2023, appearing as a late substitute in an FA Cup match against Hartlepool United.

On 1 September 2023, Macari joined League Two side Notts County on a six-month loan. He scored on his Football League debut. On 15 December 2023, Macari signed a permanent contract with Notts County.

In October 2025, Macari was given a suspended three-month ban for breaching betting rules, having placed a total of 354 bets on matches between February 2020 and December 2022. He later said that he had been "stupid" to gamble.

== International career ==
He made one appearance for Scotland under-18s in 2019.

== Personal life ==
Macari comes from a sporting family: his father, Paul, uncle Mike, and grandfather Lou all played professional football.

== Career statistics ==
As of match played 25 April 2026

Appearances and goals by club, season and competition
Club	Season	League			National Cup (Note: Includes FA Cup & FAI Cup)		League Cup		Other		Total	
Club	Season	Division	Apps	Goals	Apps	Goals	Apps	Goals	Apps	Goals	Apps	Goals
Stoke City	2018–19	Championship	0	0	0	0	0	0	—		0	0
Stoke City	2019–20	Championship	0	0	0	0	0	0	—		0	0
Stoke City	2020–21	Championship	0	0	0	0	0	0	—		0	0
Stoke City	2021–22	Championship	0	0	0	0	0	0	—		0	0
Stoke City	2022–23	Championship	0	0	1	0	0	0	—		1	0
Stoke City	2023–24	Championship	0	0	0	0	0	0	—		0	0
Stoke City	Total		0	0	1	0	0	0	0	0	1	0
Market Drayton Town (loan)	2018–19	NPL Division One West	4	0	0	0	—		—		4	0
Dundalk (loan)	2022	League of Ireland Premier Division	34	1	3	0	—		—		37	1
Notts County (loan)	2023–24	League Two	7	1	1	0	0	0	2 (Note: Appearance(s) in EFL Trophy.)	0	10	1
Notts County	2023–24	League Two	15	0	0	0	0	0	—		15	0
Notts County	2024–25	League Two	31	0	1	0	1	0	3 (Note: One appearance in the EFL Trophy, two appearances in the playoffs)	0	36	0
Notts County	2025–26	League Two	35	0	1	0	0	0	3	0	39	0
Notts County	Total		81	0	2	0	1	0	6	0	90	0
Career total			126	2	7	0	1	0	8	0	142	2
