= John Bostock =

English footballer (born 1992)

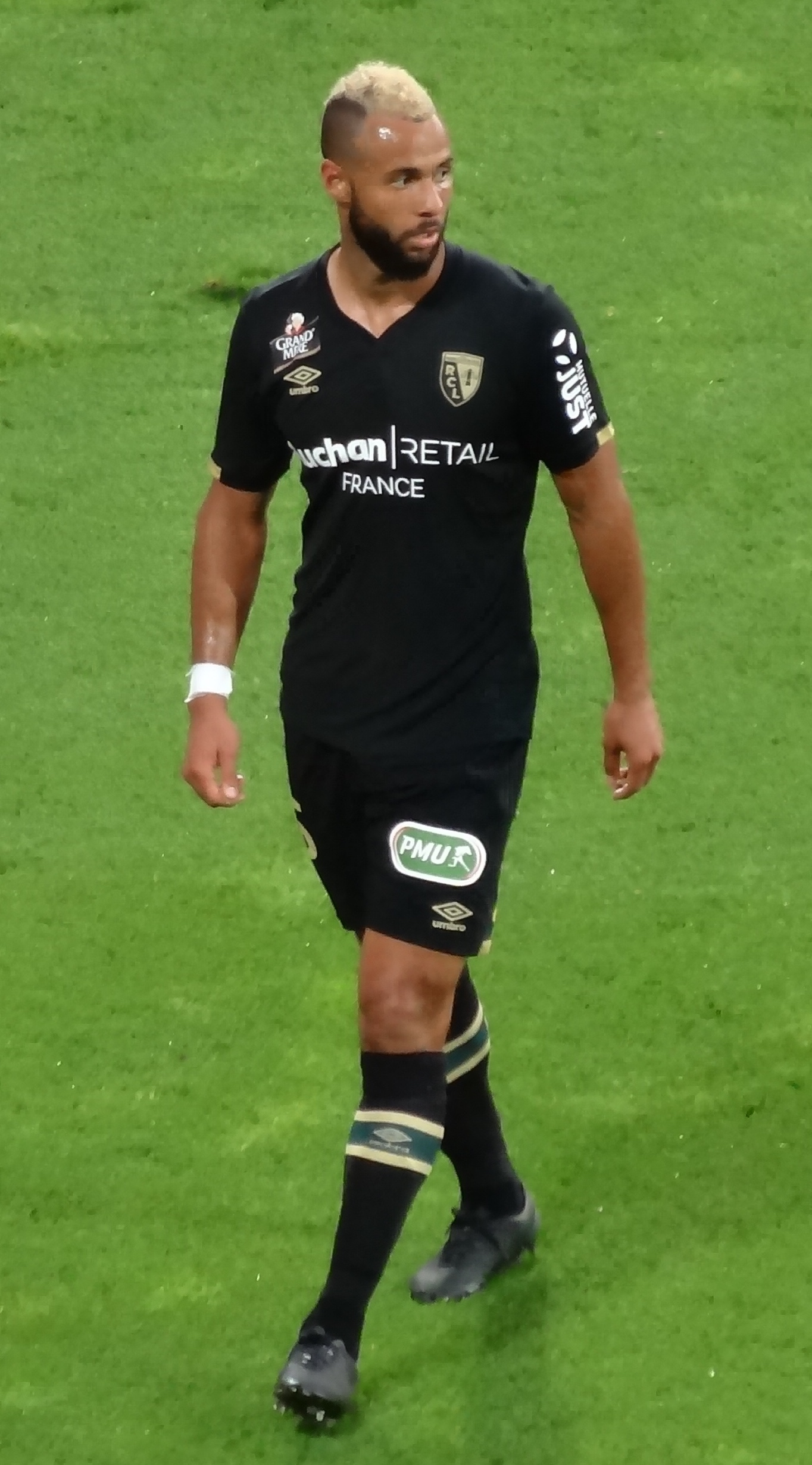
- Bostock playing for RC Lens in 2016

Personal information
- Full name: John Joseph Bostock
- Date of birth: 15 January 1992 (age 34)
- Place of birth: Camberwell, England
- Height: 6 ft 2 in (1.88 m)
- Position: Midfielder

Youth career
- 1999–2007: Crystal Palace

Senior career*
Years	Team	Apps	(Gls)
2007–2008	Crystal Palace	4	(0)
2008–2013	Tottenham Hotspur	0	(0)
2009–2010	→ Brentford (loan)	9	(2)
2010–2011	→ Hull City (loan)	11	(2)
2012	→ Sheffield Wednesday (loan)	4	(0)
2012–2013	→ Swindon Town (loan)	11	(0)
2013	→ Toronto FC (loan)	7	(0)
2013–2014	Royal Antwerp	31	(1)
2014–2016	OH Leuven	51	(18)
2016–2018	Lens	42	(5)
2018	Bursaspor	8	(0)
2018–2020	Toulouse	16	(0)
2019–2020	→ Nottingham Forest (loan)	7	(0)
2021–2022	Doncaster Rovers	39	(0)
2022–2024	Notts County	60	(3)
2024–2025	Solihull Moors	34	(0)

International career
2006–2007	England U16	6	(0)
2007–2009	England U17	25	(0)
2009–2010	England U19	9	(2)
- * Club domestic league appearances and goals as of 09:52, 5 April 2025 (UTC)

John Joseph Bostock (born 15 January 1992) is an English former professional footballer who most recently played as a midfielder for National League club Solihull Moors.

Bostock made his professional debut for Crystal Palace at the age of 15. In 2008, he signed for Tottenham Hotspur for an initial £700,000. He played only four games for Tottenham, none of which were in the Premier League, spending most of his time on loan at various clubs in the English Football League, and later with Toronto FC. In 2013, Bostock was released and moved to Belgium, representing Royal Antwerp and OH Leuven. In summer 2016, he joined French side Lens where he stayed for one and a half seasons.

Born in England, Bostock represented the country up to under-19 level. In 2016, he chose to represent his ancestral Trinidad & Tobago at full international level, although he has yet to appear for them.

== Club career ==
=== Crystal Palace ===
Bostock began his career with Crystal Palace at the age of five. At the age of 14 he was offered a contract by Spanish club Barcelona.

Bostock made his league debut on 29 October 2007 at the age of 15 years and 287 days, playing 20 minutes as a substitute for Ben Watson in a 2–0 defeat to Watford at Selhurst Park, making him Palace's youngest ever player. He also became the youngest ever Palace player to start a game, aged 15 years and 295 days, on 6 November 2007 against Cardiff City at Ninian Park.

=== Tottenham Hotspur ===
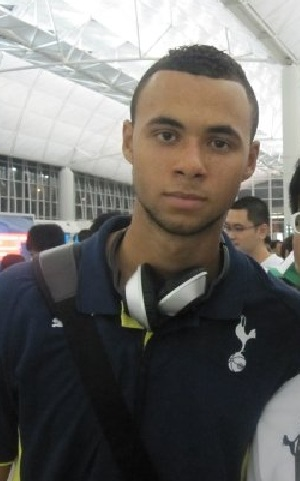
Bostock with Tottenham Hotspur in 2009

On 30 May 2008, Tottenham Hotspur announced the signing of Bostock on their club website. Crystal Palace later issued a statement denying reports that an agreement had been reached with Tottenham. Tottenham and Crystal Palace entered negotiations over the transfer fee, but agreement could not be reached, leading to the sum being decided at a tribunal. On 9 July, the tribunal declared that Tottenham would pay £700,000 for Bostock, with add-on payments of up to £1.25m dependent on appearances and a further £200,000 should he make his full international debut. A sell-on clause entitled Crystal Palace to 15% of any profit Tottenham makes from any future sale of Bostock's contract. Crystal Palace chairman Simon Jordan said he was so disgusted with Bostock and his stepfather that he intended to revoke and refund their Selhurst Park season tickets for 2008–09, which the pair had already purchased.

Bostock made his first team debut for Spurs in an 8–0 pre-season win over Spanish side Tavernes, providing the cross for Aaron Lennon's opening goal. On 6 November 2008, he made his competitive match debut in the 2008 UEFA Cup game against Dinamo Zagreb, coming on as a substitute, and becoming the youngest player ever to play for Spurs at 16 years, 295 days, just beating the previous record-holder Ally Dick by six days. Bostock made a further two appearances in the UEFA Cup that season, however his career with Tottenham stalled after that and had to wait until January 2012 for his next appearance, in an FA Cup match against Cheltenham Town.

=== Loan spells ===
On 13 November 2009, Bostock joined League One club Brentford on loan for a month, he was handed the number 17 shirt immediately. Bostock scored twice on his debut against Millwall.

On 6 August 2010, Bostock had joined newly relegated Hull City on a season-long loan. He scored with a 30-yard strike described as a "wonder goal" on his debut against Swansea on 7 August. On 31 December 2010, Tottenham Hotspur announced that Bostock had returned early from his largely unsuccessful loan spell at Hull City.

Bostock joined Sheffield Wednesday on loan on 30 January 2012 for the remainder of the 2011–12 season. He made his debut the following day as a substitute in a 1–1 draw with MK Dons. He was recalled to Spurs in March after playing only four games.

Bostock joined Swindon Town on loan on 22 March 2012 for the remainder of the season, after Tottenham manager Harry Redknapp said it would be good for him to play under Paolo Di Canio. He made his debut on 25 March in the 2012 Football League Trophy Final, which Swindon lost 2–0 to Chesterfield. He made his league debut against Gillingham on 21 April. He made his home debut on 28 April, in a 5–0 win against Port Vale in a game that saw Swindon crowned League Two champions. He made his final appearance on the final day of the season in a 0–0 draw against Bradford.

He returned on loan to Swindon on 30 August 2012 until January 2013. He made his first appearance 2 days later against Preston. He made his home debut on 5 September in the Football League Trophy against rivals Oxford United. Bostock returned to Tottenham on 7 January 2013.

In February 2013, it was reported that Bostock was having trials with two different MLS clubs with a view to a loan move. He officially joined Toronto FC on 8 March, and made his debut for team the following day in a 2–1 home victory over Sporting Kansas City where he was substituted in the 85th minute. On 24 May, Bostock was given a waiver (release) by Toronto, ending his loan stint with the club. On 7 June, the Premier League confirmed that Bostock was one of a number of Premier League players who were being released by their clubs and were now free agents, advertising their availability to other clubs. The official announcement from Tottenham was made on 10 June, which included Bostock, amongst a number of Spurs players who would not be re-signed and were being released.

=== Royal Antwerp ===
On 11 July 2013, Bostock joined Royal Antwerp in the Belgian second division under the tutelage of manager Jimmy Floyd Hasselbaink. Despite scoring just one goal he flourished at Antwerp providing 16 assists in his first season and soon became a fans favourite helping the team to finish 6th in the league narrowly missing out on the playoffs.

=== OH Leuven ===
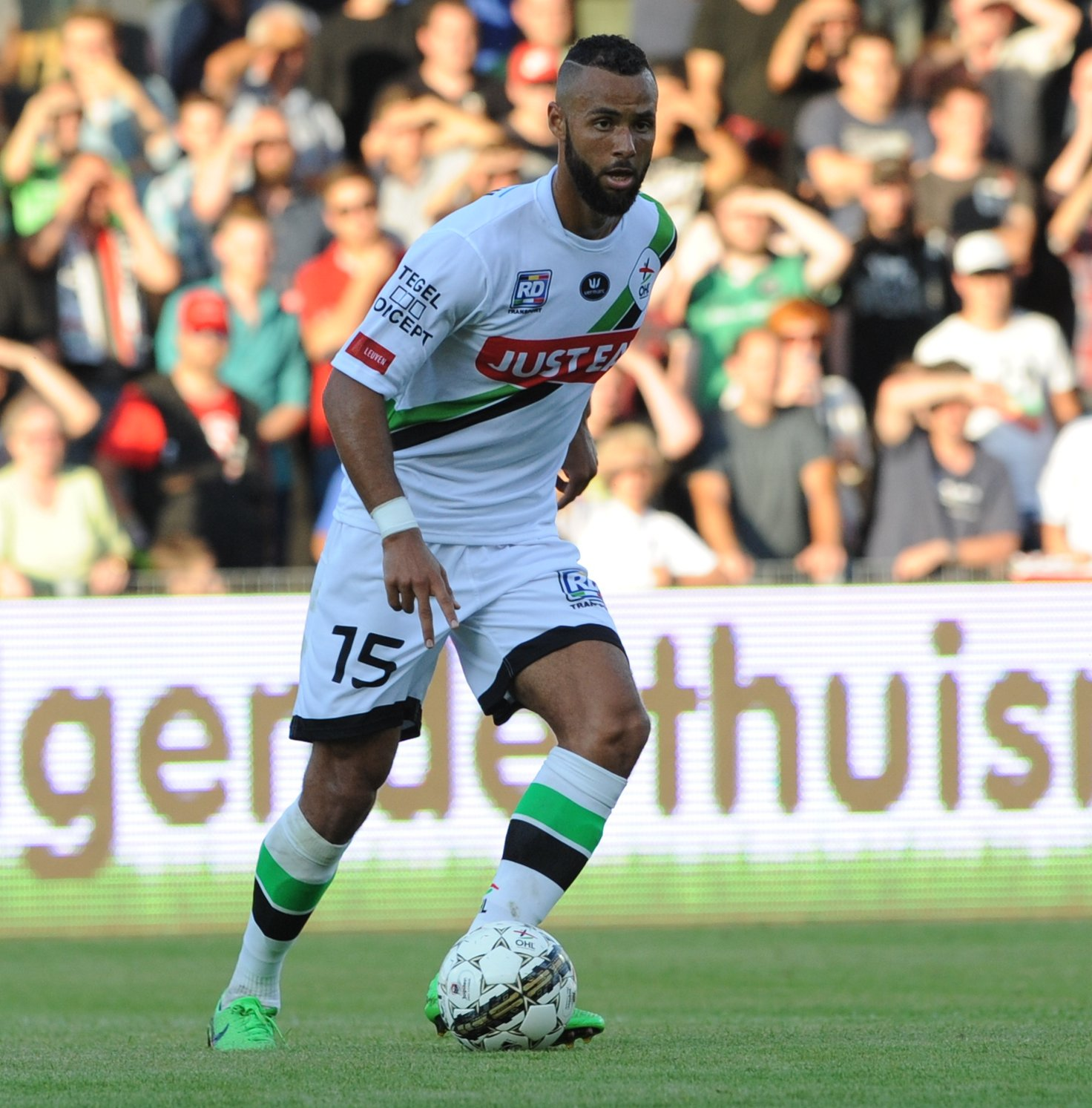
John Bostock for OHL in 2015

His strong performances earned him a move to newly relegated side Oud-Heverlee Leuven, where he continued to blossom. In his second season in Belgium, Bostock went on to help his new side OHL win promotion via the playoffs. Along the way he scooped the Proximus Player of the Season Award after scoring 13 goals and providing 19 assists.

=== Lens ===
On 5 July 2016, Bostock joined Ligue 2 team RC Lens on a two-year deal.

On 9 August 2016, Bostock scored his first goal for Lens with a 26th-minute free-kick against AC Ajaccio in the first round of the Coupe de la Ligue. He scored his first league goal for the club in a 2–0 win over Nîmes on 15 August 2016. He scored an eighth-minute penalty in a 1–1 draw with Troyes on 26 August 2016 before scoring twice in a 4–2 win over Orléans on 20 September 2016. He scored his fifth league goal of the season with a penalty against Red Star on 30 September 2016. Bostock was named Ligue 2 player of the month in September and then again in October 2016. He was awarded Ligue 2 player of the year after his first season in French football on 15 May 2017.

=== Bursaspor ===
In January 2018, Bostock signed with Süper Lig side Bursaspor, having agreed a 2 1/2-year contract with the club.

=== Toulouse ===
In July 2018, Bostock returned to France signing a three-year contract with Toulouse FC, managed by his former Lens boss Alain Casanova.

On 8 August 2019, Bostock returned to England with a season-long loan to Championship side Nottingham Forest.

He left Toulouse by mutual consent in October 2020.

=== Doncaster Rovers ===
Bostock joined League One club Doncaster Rovers on an 18-month contract in January 2021. On 1 June 2022, following Doncaster Rovers's relegation from League One, it was announced that he had turned down a new contract and would be leaving the club. He made 39 league appearances for the club.

=== Notts County ===
On 7 December 2022, Bostock signed for National League club Notts County on an eighteen-month contract. In the 2023 National League play-off final, Bostock scored an 87th-minute equaliser against Chesterfield to send the match to extra time. In the penalty shootout, Bostock attempted a Panenka penalty but hit the bar. However, Notts County would prevail 4–3 to earn promotion. He was released by the team after the conclusion of the 2023-2024 season.

=== Solihull Moors ===
On 27 July 2024, it was announced that Bostock signed for National League side Solihull Moors. He signed a two-year deal. He left the club in July 2025.

== International career ==
Bostock captained England at Under-17 level.

He was eligible to represent England, Trinidad & Tobago and Scotland. In March 2013, the Trinidad and Tobago Football Federation announced that he had shown interest in representing the Soca Warriors at international level. Three years later, on 18 March 2016, he was selected for the double confrontation with Saint Vincent and the Grenadines as part of the 2018 FIFA World Cup qualification CONCACAF fourth round.

== Personal life ==
Bostock is a devout Christian. In 2015 he founded Ballers in God, a group that brings together Christian footballers. His family support Crystal Palace. As of November 2020 he had been married for ten years and had a young son.

== Career statistics ==
As of match played 5 April 2025

Appearances and goals by club, season and competition
Club	Season	League			National cup (Note: Includes FA Cup, Canadian Championship, Belgian Cup, Coupe de France)		League cup (Note: Includes League Cup, Coupe de la Ligue)		Europe		Other		Total	
Club	Season	Division	Apps	Goals	Apps	Goals	Apps	Goals	Apps	Goals	Apps	Goals	Apps	Goals
Crystal Palace	2007–08	Championship	4	0	1	0	—		—		—		5	0
Tottenham Hotspur	2008–09	Premier League	0	0	—		0	0	3	0	—		3	0
Tottenham Hotspur	2010–11	Premier League	0	0	—		0	0	0	0	—		0	0
Tottenham Hotspur	2011–12	Premier League	0	0	1	0	0	0	0	0	—		1	0
Tottenham Hotspur	Total		0	0	1	0	0	0	3	0	—		4	0
Brentford (loan)	2009–10	League One	9	2	1	0	—		—		—		10	2
Hull City (loan)	2010–11	Championship	11	2	—		—		—		—		11	2
Sheffield Wednesday (loan)	2011–12	League One	4	0	—		—		—		—		4	0
Swindon Town (loan)	2011–12	League Two	3	0	—		—		—		1 (Note: Appearance in Football League Trophy)	0	4	0
Swindon Town (loan)	2012–13	League One	8	0	—		—		—		1	0	9	0
Toronto FC (loan)	2013	MLS	7	0	2	0	—		—		—		9	0
Royal Antwerp	2013–14	Belgian Second Division	29	1	—		—		—		—		29	1
Royal Antwerp	2014–15	Belgian Second Division	2	0	—		—		—		—		2	0
Royal Antwerp	Total		31	1	0	0	0	0	0	0	0	0	31	1
OH Leuven	2014–15	Belgian Second Division	26	11	—		—		—		5 (Note: Appearances in Belgian Second Division play-offs)	2	31	13
OH Leuven	2015–16	Belgian Pro League	25	7	2	0	—		—		—		27	7
OH Leuven	Total		51	18	2	0	0	0	0	0	5	2	58	20
Lens	2016–17	Ligue 2	31	5	—		1	1	—		—		32	6
Lens	2017–18	Ligue 2	11	0	1	0	2	0	—		—		14	0
Lens	Total		42	5	1	0	3	1	0	0	0	0	46	6
Bursaspor	2017–18	Süper Lig	8	0	0	0	—		—		—		8	0
Toulouse	2018–19	Ligue 1	16	0	1	0	1	0	—		—		18	0
Nottingham Forest (loan)	2019–20	Championship	7	0	0	0	2	0	—		—		9	0
Doncaster Rovers	2020–21	League One	18	0	—		—		—		0	0	18	0
Doncaster Rovers	2021–22	League One	21	0	1	0	1	0	—		2 (Note: Appearances in EFL Trophy)	0	25	0
Doncaster Rovers	Total		39	0	1	0	1	0	0	0	2	0	43	0
Notts County	2022–23	National League	23	1	—		—		—		2 (Note: Appearances in National League play offs)	1	25	2
Notts County	2023–24	League Two	37	2	1	0	1	0	0	0	2	0	41	2
Notts County	Total		60	3	1	0	1	0	0	0	4	1	66	4
Solihull Moors	2024–25	National League	34	0	1	0	—		—				35	0
Career total			334	31	12	0	8	1	3	0	13	3	370	35

== Honours ==
Swindon Town

- Football League Trophy runner-up: 2011–12

OH Leuven

- Belgian Second Division play-offs: 2015

Notts County

- National League play-offs: 2023

Individual

- Belgian Second Division Player of the Season: 2014–15
- Ligue 2 Player of the Year: 2017
