= Luther Munakandafa =

English footballer (born 2004)

Personal information
- Full name: Luther Munakandafa
- Date of birth: 14 April 2004 (age 22)
- Position: Forward

Team information
- Current team: Belper Town (dual-registration with Spalding United)

Youth career
- –2022: Notts County

Senior career*
Years	Team	Apps	(Gls)
2022–2024	Notts County	0	(0)
2022	→ Melton Town (loan)	5	(3)
2022–2023	→ Basford United (loan)	15	(2)
2023	→ Boston United (loan)	7	(0)
2023	→ Gainsborough Trinity (loan)	8	(0)
2023	→ Rushall Olympic (loan)	6	(1)
2024	→ Truro City (loan)	5	(0)
2024–	Spalding United	1	(0)
2024–	→ Belper Town (dual-registration)	1	(0)
- * Club domestic league appearances and goals as of 15:11, 17 October 2024 (UTC)

Luther Munakandafa (born 14 April 2004) is an English footballer who plays as a forward for Belper Town on dual-registration with Spalding United.

== Career ==
Having been with the youth academies of Nottingham Forest, Munakandafa joined Notts County following his departure. Towards the end of the 2021–22 season, he spent time on loan with United Counties League club Melton Town as well as undergoing a trial with Blackburn Rovers. At the end of the season, he signed a first professional contract with the Magpies.

Throughout the 2022–23 season, Munakandafa enjoyed first-team experience with a number of loan spells. He firstly joined Basford United on a three-month loan deal in September 2023, this being extended before his recall in January 2023. He then spent time with National League North club Boston United, before finishing the season with Gainsborough Trinit.

On 12 September 2023, he made his first-team debut for Notts County, starting in a 2–1 EFL Trophy defeat to Wolverhampton Wanderers U21. On 19 October 2023, he joined National League North club Rushall Olympic on an initial one-month youth loan deal, scoring his club's final goal in a 5–0 victory over Chorley on his debut. In March 2024, he joined National League South side Truro City on loan for the remainder of the season.

In October 2024, Munakandafa joined Spalding United. Shortly after joining the club, he joined Belper Town on a short-term dual-registration.

== Career statistics ==
As of match played 14 November 2023

Appearances and goals by club, season and competition
Club	Season	League			FA Cup		League Cup		Other		Total	
Club	Season	Division	Apps	Goals	Apps	Goals	Apps	Goals	Apps	Goals	Apps	Goals
Notts County	2023–24	League Two	0	0	0	0	0	0	1 (Note: Appearance(s) in EFL Trophy)	0	1	0
Rushall Olympic (loan)	2023–24	National League North	6	1	0	0	—		1 (Note: Appearance(s) in FA Trophy)	0	7	1
Career total			6	1	0	0	0	0	2	0	8	1
