= Tiernan Brooks =

Irish-English footballer (born 2002)

Personal information
- Full name: Tiernan Jon Brooks
- Date of birth: 17 June 2002 (age 24)
- Place of birth: Sheffield, England
- Height: 1.91 m (6 ft 3 in)
- Position: Goalkeeper

Team information
- Current team: Charlton Athletic
- Number: 21

Youth career
- Sheffield Wednesday
- –2019: Notts County

Senior career*
Years	Team	Apps	(Gls)
2019–2024	Notts County	4	(0)
2019–2020	→ Lincoln United (loan)	10	(0)
2020–2021	→ Worksop Town (loan)	10	(0)
2021–2022	→ Coalville Town (loan)	13	(0)
2022	→ Hednesford Town (loan)	16	(0)
2023	→ Boston United (loan)	3	(0)
2023	→ Cork City (loan)	3	(0)
2024	→ Rochdale (loan)	12	(0)
2024–2026	Gateshead	47	(0)
2026–	Charlton Athletic	0	(0)

International career
2023–2024	Republic of Ireland U21	5	(0)
- * Club domestic league appearances and goals as of 22:10, 28 January 2026 (UTC)

Tiernan Jon Brooks (born 17 June 2002) is a professional footballer who plays as a goalkeeper for EFL Championship club Charlton Athletic. Born in England, Brooks has represented the Republic of Ireland at youth international level.

== Club career ==
=== Notts County ===
Born in Sheffield, Brooks played for Sheffield Wednesday before joining Notts County's academy. During the 2019–20 season, Brooks spent time on loan at Lincoln United. There, he impressed Lincoln chairman Rob Bradley, who described him as "the best young goalkeeper I've ever seen". He spent time with Worksop Town F.C. in late 2020 and August 2021, while he was sent on loan at Coalville Town in February 2022.

Brooks signed a new three-year contract with Notts County in June 2022. He then had loan spells with Hednesford Town and Boston United during the 2022–23 season. On 4 March 2023, the goalkeeper made his professional debut for Notts County in a league match against Bromley, saving a penalty eight minutes into the game. As first-choice keeper Sam Slocombe was sidelined with an injury, Brooks was given a run of games in the following weeks, including a home debut at Meadow Lane. His performances were reported to be going from "strength to strength" during this period. On 7 July 2023, Brooks signed for League of Ireland Premier Division side Cork City on loan until the end of their season in November. He made his debut on the same day, in a 1–1 draw away to St Patrick's Athletic, but he was substituted off in the 55th minute with a foot injury that would keep him out of action for several months. In January 2024, he joined National League side Rochdale on loan for the remainder of the season.

=== Gateshead ===
On 5 July 2024, Brooks joined National League side Gateshead on a two-year deal. He made his debut for Gateshead on 10 August 2024 in a 5–1 win over Ebbsfleet.

=== Charlton Athletic ===
On 28 January 2026, Brooks joined Charlton Athletic on a two-and-a-half year deal.

== International career ==
Brooks took part in a training camp with England's youth national set-up at St. George's Park in December 2021. He was put on standby selection for the England under-19 national team ahead of the 2022 European Championship, which was ultimately won by the Three Lions themselves.

He later switched allegiances to represent the Republic of Ireland, thanks to his family ties in Sligo. He made his debut for the Republic of Ireland U21 team on 26 March 2023, starting in a 2–1 win against Iceland.

== Career statistics ==
As of 26 August 2026

Appearances and goals by club, season and competition
Club	Season	League			National Cup		League Cup		Other		Total	
Club	Season	Division	Apps	Goals	Apps	Goals	Apps	Goals	Apps	Goals	Apps	Goals
Notts County	2019–20	National League	0	0	0	0	—		0	0	0	0
Notts County	2020–21	National League	0	0	0	0	—		0	0	0	0
Notts County	2021–22	National League	0	0	0	0	—		0	0	0	0
Notts County	2022–23	National League	4	0	0	0	—		0	0	4	0
Notts County	2023–24	League Two	0	0	0	0	0	0	0	0	0	0
Notts County	Total		4	0	0	0	0	0	0	0	4	0
Lincoln United (loan)	2019–20	NPL Division One South East	10	0	—		—		0	0	10	0
Worksop Town (loan)	2020–21	NPL Division One South East	10	0	0	0	—		0	0	10	0
Coalville Town (loan)	2021–22	Southern Premier Division Central	13	0	0	0	—		2 (Note: Appearances in Southern Premier Division Central play-offs)	0	15	0
Hednesford Town (loan)	2022–23	Southern Premier Division Central	16	0	1	0	—		3 (Note: Appearance(s) in FA Trophy)	0	20	0
Boston United (loan)	2022–23	National League North	3	0	0	0	—		0	0	3	0
Cork City (loan)	2023	League of Ireland Premier Division	3	0	0	0	—		1 (Note: Appearances in League of Ireland Premier Division play-offs)	0	4	0
Rochdale (loan)	2023–24	National League	12	0	—		—		0	0	12	0
Gateshead	2024–25	National League	24	0	0	0	—		1 (Note: Appearances in National League Cup)	0	25	0
Gateshead	2025–26	National League	23	0	2	0	—		2 (Note: Appearances in National League Cup)	0	27	0
Gateshead	Total		47	0	2	0	0	0	3	0	52	0
Charlton Athletic	2025–26	Championship	0	0	—		—		—		0	0
Charlton Athletic	2026–27	Championship	0	0	0	0	1	0	—		1	0
Charlton Athletic	Total		0	0	0	0	1	0	0	0	1	0
Career total			93	0	3	0	1	0	9	0	106	0
