= Macaulay Langstaff =

English footballer (born 1997)

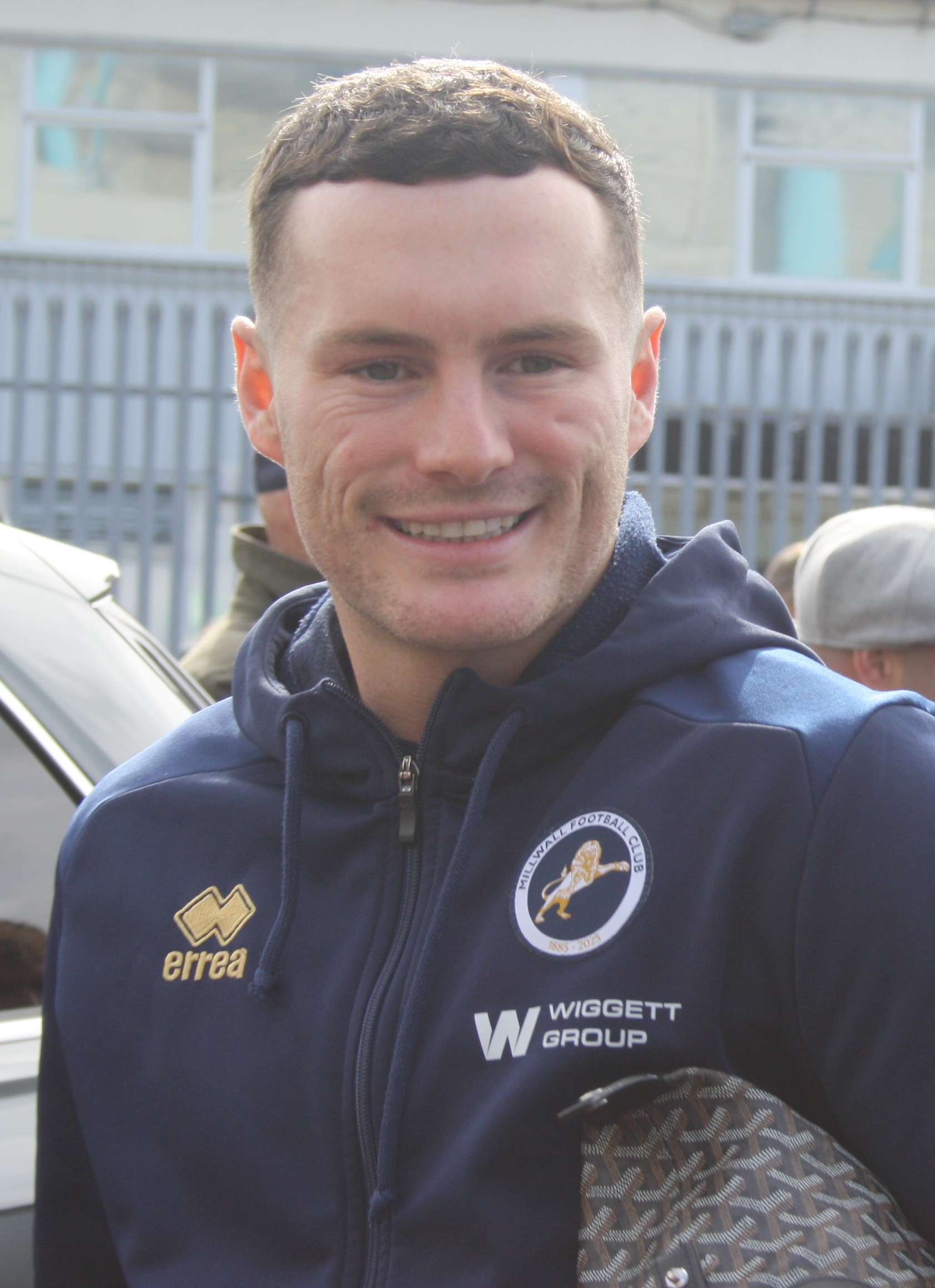
- Langstaff in 2026.

Personal information
- Full name: Macaulay Kevin Langstaff
- Date of birth: 3 February 1997 (age 29)
- Place of birth: Stockton-on-Tees, County Durham, England
- Height: 5 ft 10 in (1.79 m)
- Position: Forward

Team information
- Current team: Salford City
- Number: 9

Youth career
- 2007–2010: Middlesbrough
- 2010–2014: Boro Rangers
- 2014: Stockton Town

Senior career*
Years	Team	Apps	(Gls)
2014–2015	Stockton Town		
2015–2017	Billingham Synthonia		
2017–2018	Gateshead	5	(0)
2017	→ Billingham Synthonia (loan)		
2017–2018	→ Blyth Spartans (loan)	8	(0)
2018	→ Blyth Spartans (loan)	9	(0)
2018–2020	York City	52	(11)
2019	→ Bradford (Park Avenue) (loan)	5	(1)
2020	→ Blyth Spartans (loan)	3	(0)
2020–2022	Gateshead	53	(31)
2022–2024	Notts County	91	(70)
2024–2026	Millwall	71	(5)
2026–	Salford City	14	(5)
- * Club domestic league appearances and goals as of 1 November 2026

Macaulay Kevin Langstaff (born 3 February 1997) is an English professional footballer who plays as a forward for EFL League Two club Salford City.

As of 2023, he holds the National League record for most league goals scored in a season.

== Early life ==
Macaulay Kevin Langstaff was born on 3 February 1997 in Stockton-on-Tees, County Durham. He often attended Middlesbrough games as a child, and played for Marton FC.

== Career ==
=== Early career ===
When he was 10, Langstaff joined the academy of Middlesbrough, where he played until he was 13. He played for Boro Rangers for the next four years, before signing for Wearside Football League club Stockton Town in 2014. He moved up to Stockton's first team later that season, as they won the Shipowners' Cup for the first time.

In 2015, while in college, he started playing for Billingham Synthonia. After scoring 31 in goals in 65 appearances in all competitions, he took on a local agent and signed his first professional contract with Gateshead in February 2017. He made five appearances before being loaned back to Billingham and to Blyth Spartans.

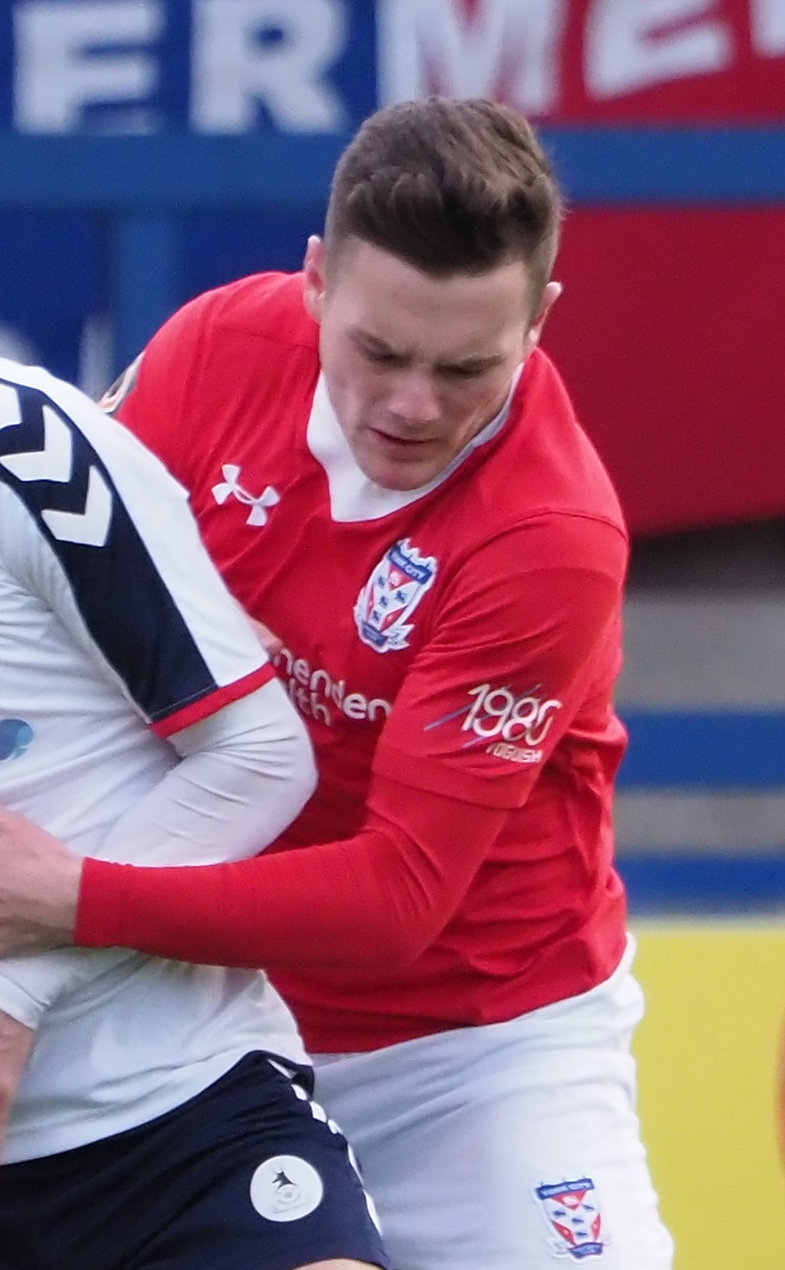
Langstaff playing for York City in 2018.

In 2018, he moved to York City, where he played for two years. In 2020, he returned to Gateshead for another two seasons. In his first season, he scored four goals in 16 appearances. In the 2021–22 season, he scored 32 goals across all competitions, leading the league, and was named Player of the Season. He was also named in the league's Team of the Year. Gateshead earned promotion to the National League that season as champions.

=== Notts County ===
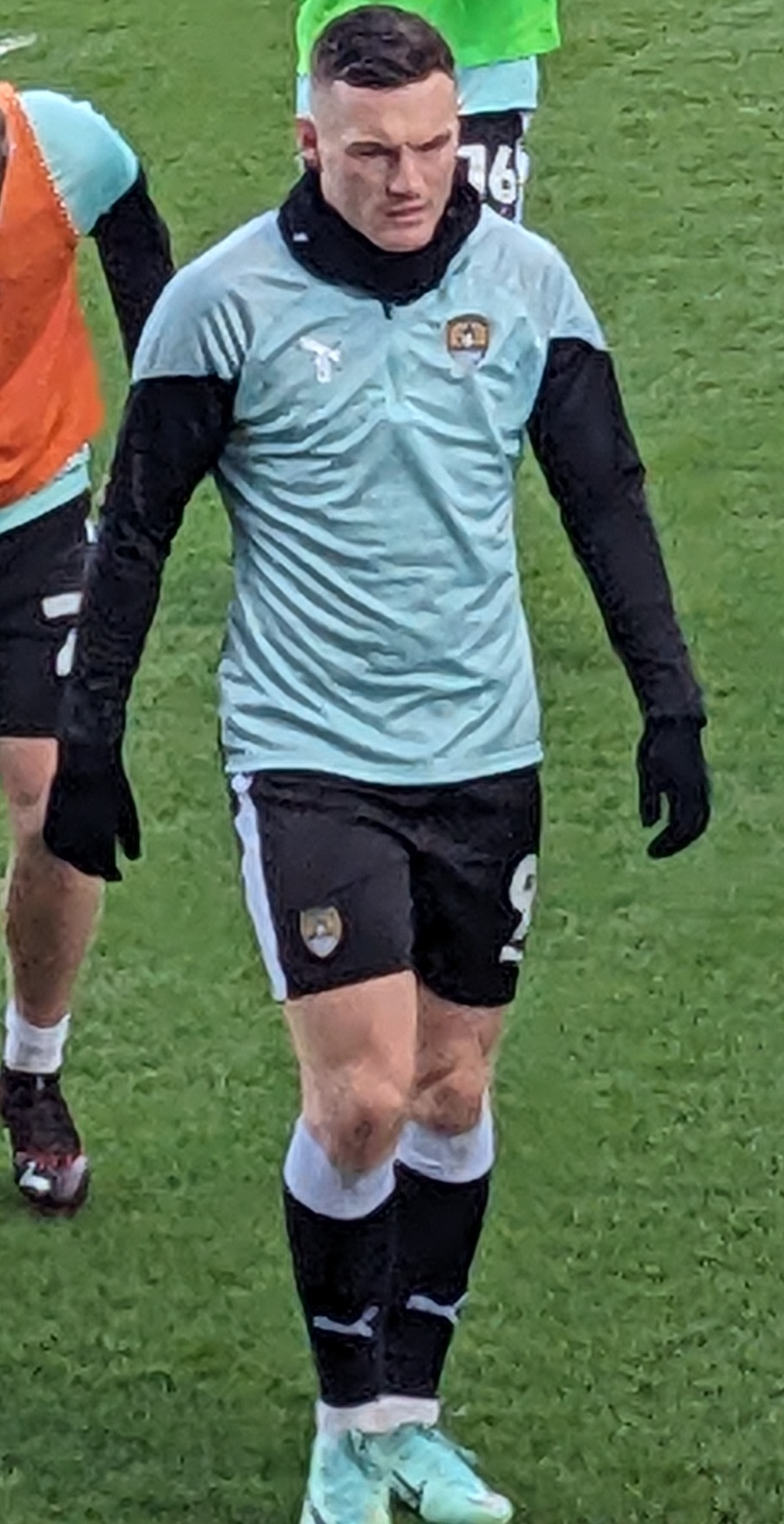
Langstaff warming up for Notts County in 2024

In 2022, Langstaff joined Notts County on a three-year contract for a transfer fee of £50,000. In October, he became the first player to win back-to-back National League Player of the month awards. By mid-October he had scored 15 goals in 13 games and was being compared to Erling Haaland, as they vied to be the top scorer in the top five leagues. On 7 April 2023, he scored his 41st goal in 41 league games, none of them penalties. This set a new County club record, and the National League division record, for league goals in a season. At the end of the 2022–23 season, Langstaff was voted as the Notts County Fans' and Players' Player of the Season. He played in County's 2–2 extra-time draw with Chesterfield on 13 May at Wembley Stadium in the 2023 National League play-off final, with County winning the ensuing penalty shoot-out 4–3 to earn promotion to League Two. Langstaff converted his kick during the shootout.

On 7 August 2023, after fielding offers from teams in higher leagues, Langstaff signed a new contract with Notts County, contracting him to the club until the end of the 2026–27 season. He started the 2023–24 season strongly, with 11 goals in his first 15 appearances. He recorded a first-half hat-trick in Notts' 5–0 win over Morecambe on 29 December, which was his first hat-trick in the English Football League. By the start of 2024, he was the top scorer in the EFL, with 20 goals in 27 appearances. He won a third consecutive golden boot award for the 2023–24 season with a tally of twenty-eight and finished the season as the top scorer in the EFL. On 10 June 2024, it was announced that Langstaff would become Notts County's club captain.

=== Millwall ===
On 8 July 2024, Langstaff signed for Championship club Millwall on a long-term contract for an undisclosed fee. He made his debut on 10 August 2024, coming off the bench in a 3–2 home defeat to Watford. His first goal for the club came on 28 September in a 3–1 home win against Preston North End.

=== Salford City ===
On 3 July 2026, Langstaff signed for League Two club Salford City on a multi-year deal for an undisclosed fee. He made his debut for the club on 8 August 2026, in a 1–1 draw with Shrewsbury Town. He scored his first goal for the club on 12 September 2026, in a 3–3 draw with Rotherham United.

== Career statistics ==
As of match played 20 October 2026

Appearances and goals by club, season and competition
Club	Season	League			FA Cup		League Cup		Other		Total	
Club	Season	Division	Apps	Goals	Apps	Goals	Apps	Goals	Apps	Goals	Apps	Goals
Gateshead	2017–18	National League	5	0	0	0	—		0	0	5	0
Blyth Spartans (loan)	2017–18	National League North	17	0	—		—		—		17	0
York City	2018–19	National League North	31	10	3	0	—		1 (Note: Appearance in FA Trophy)	0	35	10
York City	2019–20	National League North	21	1	2	0	—		2 (Note: One appearance in FA Trophy, one in National League North play-offs)	0	25	1
York City	Total		52	11	5	0	—		3	0	60	11
Bradford (Park Avenue) (loan)	2018–19	National League North	5	1	—		—		—		5	1
Blyth Spartans (loan)	2019–20	National League North	3	0	—		—		—		3	0
Gateshead	2020–21	National League North	14	3	1	0	—		1	1	16	4
Gateshead	2021–22	National League North	39	28	7	4	—		0	0	46	32
Gateshead	Total		53	31	8	4	—		1	1	62	36
Notts County	2022–23	National League	45	42	1	0	—		2 (Note: Appearances in National League play-offs)	0	48	42
Notts County	2023–24	League Two	46	28	2	1	0	0	1 (Note: Appearance in EFL Trophy)	0	49	29
Notts County	Total		91	70	3	1	0	0	3	0	97	71
Millwall	2024–25	Championship	34	1	0	0	2	0	—		36	1
Millwall	2025–26	Championship	37	4	1	0	1	0	1 (Note: Appearance in EFL Championship play-offs)	0	40	4
Millwall	Total		71	5	1	0	3	0	1	0	76	5
Salford City	2026–27	League Two	12	4	0	0	1	0	0	0	13	4
Career total			309	122	17	5	4	0	8	1	338	128

== Honours ==
Gateshead

- National League North: 2021–22

Notts County

- National League play-offs: 2023

Individual

- National League North Golden Boot: 2021–22
- National League North Team of the Year: 2021–22
- National League North Player of the Season: 2021–22
- National League Player of the Month: August 2022, September 2022, March 2023
- Notts County Supporters' Player of the Season: 2022–23
- Notts County Players' Player of the Season: 2022–23
- National League Golden Boot: 2022–23
- National League Team of the Year: 2022–23
- National League Player of the Season: 2022–23
- EFL League Two Team of the Season: 2023–24
- EFL League Two Golden Boot: 2023–24
- PFA Team of the Year: 2023–24 League Two
