= Aaron Nemane =

French-English footballer (born 1997)

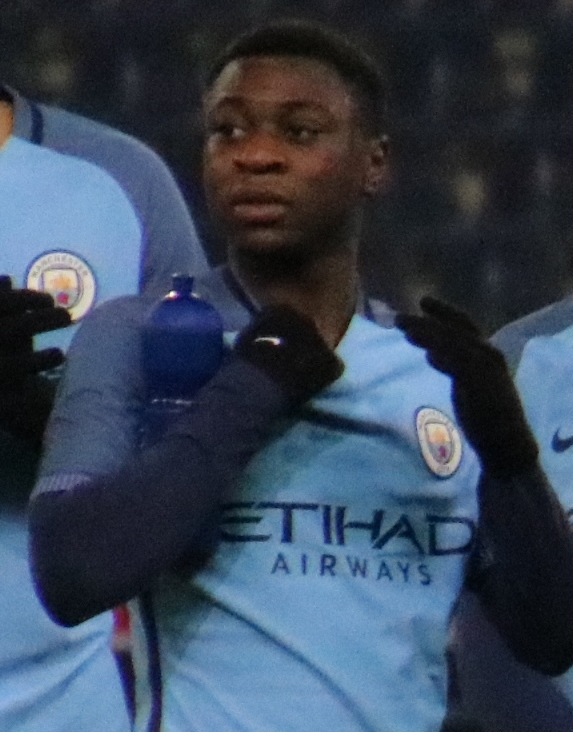
- Nemane with Manchester City U19 in 2017

Personal information
- Full name: Aaron Evans Nemane
- Date of birth: 26 September 1997 (age 29)
- Place of birth: Amiens, France
- Height: 5 ft 6 in (1.68 m)
- Positions: Right winger; right wing-back

Team information
- Current team: Rotherham United
- Number: 23

Youth career
- 2007–2008: Amiens
- 2012–2017: Manchester City

Senior career*
Years	Team	Apps	(Gls)
2017–2019	Manchester City	0	(0)
2017	→ Rangers (loan)	5	(0)
2018	→ Go Ahead Eagles (loan)	17	(2)
2018–2019	→ Tubize (loan)	22	(1)
2019–2021	Torquay United	30	(3)
2021–2024	Notts County	102	(13)
2024–2026	Milton Keynes Dons	78	(3)
2026–	Rotherham United	2	(1)
- * Club domestic league appearances and goals as of 15:00, 2 May 2026 (UTC)

Aaron Evans Nemane (born 26 September 1997) is a French professional footballer who plays as a right winger or right wing-back for EFL League Two club Rotherham United.

A graduate of the Manchester City academy, his previous clubs include Milton Keynes Dons, Notts County and Rangers.

== Early life ==
Nemane was born in Amiens, France but was raised in Blackley, Manchester. He has not yet decided on his international future as he qualifies for both the French and English national teams. However, he has disclosed a preference to play for France.

== Career ==
=== Manchester City ===
Nemane joined the academy of Premier League club Manchester City at a young age, and rose through the ranks featuring regularly for the club's Elite Development Squad (EDS) side domestically and in the UEFA Youth League.

Nemane joined Scottish Premiership club Rangers on 22 August 2017, on a five-month loan from Manchester City where he went on to make five appearances. Upon returning to Manchester City, Nemane was sent out on loan again for brief spells with Eredivisie club Go Ahead Eagles and Belgian First Division B side Tubize. At the conclusion of the 2018–19 season, Nemane was one of several EDS players released by Manchester City.

=== Torquay United ===
On 14 December 2019, Nemane joined National League club Torquay United on a short-term contract. After impressing in his first few appearances, Nemane signed an extended deal with the club in January 2020. He went on to make 32 appearances for the club, scoring 4 goals.

=== Notts County ===
On 20 July 2021, he joined fellow National League club Notts County, having rejected a new contract from Torquay United. In his second season, Nemane was instrumental in the club achieving promotion to EFL League Two via the play-offs, making 42 appearances and scoring 3 goals. He was rewarded with a new two-year contract prior to the Notts County season.

At the conclusion of the 2023–24 campaign, Nemane's goal in Notts County's 3–1 away win over Walsall was voted the club's Goal of the Season.

=== Milton Keynes Dons ===
On 9 August 2024, Nemane joined fellow League Two club Milton Keynes Dons for an undisclosed fee, and made his debut for the club the following day in a 2–1 home defeat to Bradford City. He scored his first goal for the club on 16 August 2025, during a 5–0 home win over Cheltenham Town.

Under new coach Paul Warne, Nemane was utilised as both a winger and wing-back, and went on to achieve promotion with the club to League One at the conclusion of the 2025–26 season. His goal against Swindon Town on Boxing Day was named the club's Goal of the Season at its annual end of season awards. He was later named as one of nine players to be released by the club at the conclusion of his contract on 30 June 2026.

=== Rotherham United ===
On 7 July 2026, Nemane joined newly-relegated League Two club Rotherham United, signing a two-year deal.

== Career statistics ==
As of 2 May 2026

Appearances and goals by club, season and competition
Club	Season	League			National Cup		League Cup		Other		Total	
Club	Season	Division	Apps	Goals	Apps	Goals	Apps	Goals	Apps	Goals	Apps	Goals
Manchester City	2017–18	Premier League	0	0	0	0	0	0	0	0	0	0
Manchester City	2018–19	Premier League	0	0	0	0	0	0	0	0	0	0
Manchester City	Total		0	0	0	0	0	0	0	0	0	0
Rangers (loan)	2017–18	Scottish Premiership	5	0	0	0	1	0	0	0	6	0
Go Ahead Eagles (loan)	2017–18	Eerste Divisie	17	2	0	0	—		—		17	2
Tubize (loan)	2018–19	Belgian First Division B	22	1	1	0	—		5 (Note: Appearances in Belgian First Division B relegation play-offs)	0	28	1
Torquay United	2019–20	National League	9	0	0	0	—		2 (Note: Appearance(s) in FA Trophy)	0	11	0
Torquay United	2020–21	National League	21	3	2	1	—		1	0	24	4
Torquay United	Total		30	3	2	1	—		3	0	35	4
Notts County	2021–22	National League	20	2	4	0	—		3	0	20	2
Notts County	2022–23	National League	38	3	0	0	—		4 (Note: Two appearances in FA Trophy) (Note: Two appearances in National League Play-Offs)	0	42	3
Notts County	2023–24	League Two	44	8	2	0	0	0	2 (Note: Appearance(s) in EFL Trophy)	0	48	8
Notts County	Total		102	13	5	0	0	0	9	0	116	13
Milton Keynes Dons	2024–25	League Two	40	0	1	0	1	0	0	0	42	0
Milton Keynes Dons	2025–26	League Two	38	3	2	0	1	0	0	0	41	3
Milton Keynes Dons	Total		78	3	3	0	2	0	0	0	83	3
Rotherham United	2026–27	League Two	0	0	0	0	0	0	0	0	0	0
Career total			250	17	11	1	3	0	17	0	281	23

== Honours ==
Notts County

- National League play-offs: 2022–23

Milton Keynes Dons

- EFL League Two runner-up: 2025–26

Individual

- Notts County Goal of the Season: 2023–24
- Milton Keynes Dons Goal of the Season: 2025–26
