= Lucien Mahovo =

English footballer (born 2005)

Personal information
- Full name: Lucien Denhere Patrick Java Mahovo
- Date of birth: 7 June 2005 (age 21)
- Position: Left-back

Team information
- Current team: Norwich City
- Number: 12

Youth career
- Sheffield United
- Notts County

Senior career*
Years	Team	Apps	(Gls)
2022–2024	Notts County	1	(0)
2023	→ Long Eaton United (loan)	5	(0)
2024	→ Boston United (loan)	6	(0)
2024–	Norwich City	19	(0)
- * Club domestic league appearances and goals as of 09:11, 22 November 2026 (UTC)

Lucien Denhere Patrick Java Mahovo (born 7 June 2005) is an English professional footballer who plays as a left-back for EFL Championship club Norwich City.

== Career ==
Mahovo began his career at Sheffield United, moving to Notts County where he turned professional in December 2022, having previously made his senior debut in October 2022 in FA Cup qualifying. He moved on loan to Long Eaton United in August 2023, and Boston United in March 2024.

Mahovo signed for Norwich City in July 2024. In October 2024, he said that he was aiming to make the club's first-team. The next month he began appearing in first-team squads. He signed a new contract with Norwich in January 2025.

== Style of player ==
Originally a winger, Mahovo became a left back when he signed for Notts County.

== Personal life ==
Mahovo is of Zimbabwean descent.

== Career statistics ==
As of match played on 21 November 2026

Appearances and goals by club, season and competition
Club	Season	League			FA Cup		EFL Cup		Other		Total	
Club	Season	Division	Apps	Goals	Apps	Goals	Apps	Goals	Apps	Goals	Apps	Goals
Notts County	2022–23	National League	0	0	1	0	0	0	0	0	1	0
Notts County	2023–24	League Two	1	0	0	0	0	0	1 (Note: Appearance in the EFL Trophy)	0	2	0
Notts County	Total		1	0	1	0	0	0	1	0	3	0
Long Eaton United (loan)	2023–24	Southern Football League	5	0	1	0	0	0	1 (Note: Appearance in the FA Trophy)	0	7	0
Boston United (loan)	2023–24	National League	6	0	0	0	0	0	0	0	6	0
Norwich City	2024–25	Championship	8	0	0	0	0	0	0	0	8	0
Norwich City	2025–26	Championship	6	0	0	0	0	0	0	0	6	0
Norwich City	2026–27	Championship	5	0	0	0	0	0	0	0	5	0
Norwich City	Total		19	0	0	0	0	0	0	0	19	0
Career total			31	0	2	0	0	0	2	0	35	0
