= 2026 EFL League Two play-off final =

Association football match

2026 EFL League Two play-off Final
- Wembley Stadium in London hosted the final
Salford City	Notts County
0	3
- Date: 25 May 2026
- Venue: Wembley Stadium, London
- Referee: Tom Reeves
- Attendance: 30,851

The 2026 EFL League Two play-off final was an association football match which was played on 25 May 2026 at Wembley Stadium, London, to determine the fourth and final team to gain promotion from EFL League Two, the fourth tier of English football, to EFL League One. The top three teams of 2025–26 EFL League Two, Bromley, Milton Keynes Dons and Cambridge United, gained automatic promotion to League One, while the clubs placed from fourth to seventh in the table – Salford City, Notts County, Chesterfield and Grimsby Town – took part in the 2026 EFL play-offs. The winners of the play-off semi-finals, Salford City and Notts County, competed for the final place for the 2026–27 season in League One.

Notts County won the game 3–0 and were promoted to play in League One for the 2026–27 League One season.

== Route to the final ==
EFL League Two final table, leading positions
Pos	Team	Pld	W	D	L	GF	GA	GD	Pts
1	Bromley	46	24	15	7	71	46	+25	87
2	Milton Keynes Dons	46	24	14	8	86	45	+41	86
3	Cambridge United	46	22	16	8	66	33	+33	82
4	Salford City	46	25	6	15	61	51	+10	81
5	Notts County	46	24	8	14	74	52	+22	80
6	Chesterfield	46	21	16	9	71	56	+15	79
7	Grimsby Town	46	22	12	12	74	50	+24	78

Salford City (nicknamed the Ammies) ended the 2025–26 season in fourth place in EFL League Two, the fourth tier of the English football league system, one place ahead of Notts County (nicknamed the Magpies). Both therefore missed out on the three places for automatic promotion and instead took part in the play-offs to determine the fourth team. Salford finished one point behind Cambridge United (who were promoted in third place) and six points behind the league champions Bromley, while Notts County finished one point behind Salford. Both teams had entered their final game of the regular season with a chance of winning automatic promotion, but neither gained the necessary result.

Salford played Grimsby Town in their semi-final, with the first leg played at the latter's Blundell Park. The match was level at 1–1 by the fourth minute, before Adebola Oluwo gave the Ammies the lead shortly before half time. The goal was controversial; the Grimsby goalkeeper Jackson Smith appeared to have been unsighted by a Salford player in an offside position, but the goal was allowed, and the away team won 2–1. Salford held a 1–0 lead in the second leg, played at their Moor Lane stadium, but Grimsby scored twice through goals from Kieran Green and Jaze Kabia to win the match 2–1 in normal time and require extra time to settle the tie. Here, Kallum Cesay's close range goal in the 117th minute was enough for the match to end 2–2 after extra time, and for Salford to progress to the play-off final with a 4–3 aggregate win. The Ammies manager Karl Robinson described the win as "the second biggest night in the club's history", with the forthcoming match at Wembley Stadium "the biggest occasion in the club's history."

Notts County faced Chesterfield in their semi-final. It was a third time in six seasons that the two clubs had met in the play-offs, but the Magpies had not beaten their opponents since winning the 2023 National League play-off final, and Chesterfield had won both games between the two sides in the 2025–26 regular season. In the first leg, played at Chesterfield's SMH Group Stadium, the home side missed a fifth-minute penalty, and Jayden Luker's 28th-minute goal was enough to earn the away team a 1–0 win. Chesterfield pressed hard for an equaliser in the second leg, played at Notts County's Meadow Lane stadium, but they were unable to find a breakthrough, and a 0–0 draw was sufficient for Notts County to progress to the play-off final with a 1–0 aggregate victory. Having prevented their opponents from scoring across both ties, the Notts County manager Martin Paterson said he was "delighted with my defensive line – and that is the whole by the way."

== Match ==
=== Details ===
25 May 2026
15:00 BST

Salford City	0–3	Notts County
	Report	Jatta 32'; Ness 45'; Jones 70'

Wembley Stadium, London
Attendance: 30,851
Referee: Tom Reeves

Salford City	Notts County

GK	1	(England) Matthew Young
RB	19	(Tanzania) Haji Mnoga	(yellow card) 44'
CB	22	(Nigeria) Adebola Oluwo
CB	15	(Wales) Brandon Cooper		(substituted off) 60'
LB	29	(England) Luke Garbutt (c)
RM	26	(Republic of Ireland) Ryan Graydon
CM	18	(England) Matt Butcher		(substituted off) 46'
CM	17	(England) Josh Austerfield		(substituted off) 85'
LM	45	(England) Rosaire Longelo		(substituted off) 60'
CF	21	(Sierra Leone) Kallum Cesay
CF	23	(Nigeria) Daniel Udoh
Substitutes:
GK	33	(England) Mark Howard
DF	6	(England) Ollie Turton
DF	24	(England) Alfie Dorrington
MF	7	(Wales) Ben Woodburn	(yellow card) 90+3'	(substituted on) 46'
FW	9	(England) Cole Stockton		(substituted on) 85'
FW	14	(England) Kadeem Harris		(substituted on) 60'
FW	16	(Italy) Fabio Borini		(substituted on) 60'
Head Coach:
(England) Karl Robinson

GK	31	(England) James Belshaw
CB	12	(England) Lucas Ness	(yellow card) 57'
CB	3	(England) Rod McDonald (c)
CB	4	(Grenada) Jacob Bedeau
RM	25	(Cyprus) Nick Tsaroulla	(yellow card) 22'	(substituted off) 87'
CM	8	(Grenada) Oliver Norburn		(substituted off) 78'
CM	20	(Scotland) Scott Robertson
LM	10	(Malta) Jodi Jones		(substituted off) 86'
RW	14	(England) Tom Iorpenda
LW	16	(England) Jayden Luker		(substituted off) 68'
CF	29	(The Gambia) Alassana Jatta		(substituted off) 86'
Substitutes:
GK	21	(England) Harry Griffiths
DF	47	(England) Keanan Bennetts		(substituted on) 87'
MF	11	(Republic of Ireland) Conor Grant		(substituted on) 68'
MF	17	(Afghanistan) Maziar Kouhyar		(substituted on) 86'
MF	18	(England) Matt Palmer		(substituted on) 78'
FW	19	(England) Matthew Dennis
FW	39	(Zimbabwe) Lee Ndlovu		(substituted on) 86'
Head Coach:
(Northern Ireland) Martin Paterson
