= 2025–26 English Football League =

127th season of the English Football League

English Football League
- Season: 2025–26
- Champions: Coventry City
- Promoted: Ipswich Town; Hull City
- Relegated: Harrogate Town; Barrow
- New clubs in league: Barnet; Oldham Athletic

The 2025–26 English Football League is the 127th season of the English Football League (EFL) and the ninth season under that name after it was renamed from The Football League in 2016. For the 13th season, the league is sponsored by Sky Betting & Gaming and is therefore known as the Sky Bet EFL.

The EFL is contested through three divisions: the Championship, League One and League Two. The winner and the runner-up of the Championship are automatically promoted to the Premier League and they are joined by the winner of the Championship play-off. The bottom two teams in League Two are relegated to the National League.

== Promotion and relegation ==
=== From the Premier League ===
Relegated to the Championship

- Ipswich Town
- Leicester City
- Southampton

=== From the Championship ===
Promoted to the Premier League

- Leeds United
- Burnley
- Sunderland

Relegated to League One

- Luton Town
- Plymouth Argyle
- Cardiff City

=== From League One ===
Promoted to the Championship

- Birmingham City
- Wrexham
- Charlton Athletic

Relegated to League Two

- Crawley Town
- Bristol Rovers
- Cambridge United
- Shrewsbury Town

=== From League Two ===
Promoted to League One

- Doncaster Rovers
- Port Vale
- Bradford City
- AFC Wimbledon

Relegated to the National League

- Carlisle United
- Morecambe

=== From the National League ===
Promoted to League Two

- Barnet
- Oldham Athletic

== Map of teams ==
Locations of the 2025–26 English Football League teams:
Red: Region
Blue: Championship
Yellow: League One
Green: League Two

Locations of the 2025–26 English Football League teams in Greater London
Locations of the 2025–26 English Football League teams in the West Midlands
Locations of the 2025–26 English Football League teams in South Yorkshire
Locations of 2025–26 EFL Northwest teams (Lancashire and Greater Manchester)

== Championship ==
=== Table ===
Pos	Team	Pld	W	D	L	GF	GA	GD	Pts	Promotion, qualification or relegation
1	Coventry City (C, P)	46	28	11	7	97	45	+52	95	Promotion to the Premier League
2	Ipswich Town (P)	46	23	15	8	80	47	+33	84	Promotion to the Premier League
3	Millwall	46	24	11	11	64	49	+15	83	Qualification for the Championship play-offs
4	Southampton (Note: Southampton qualified for the play-offs and defeated Middlesbrough to qualify for the final, but were subsequently disqualified for multiple breaches of EFL regulations related to the unauthorised filming of other clubs' training, with Middlesbrough taking their place in the play-off final.) (D)	46	22	14	10	82	56	+26	80	Qualification for the Championship play-offs
5	Middlesbrough	46	22	14	10	72	47	+25	80	Qualification for the Championship play-offs
6	Hull City (O, P)	46	21	10	15	70	66	+4	73	Qualification for the Championship play-offs
7	Wrexham	46	19	14	13	69	65	+4	71	
8	Derby County	46	20	9	17	67	59	+8	69	
9	Norwich City	46	19	8	19	63	56	+7	65	
10	Birmingham City	46	17	13	16	57	56	+1	64	
11	Swansea City	46	18	10	18	57	59	−2	64	
12	Bristol City	46	17	11	18	59	59	0	62	
13	Sheffield United	46	18	6	22	66	66	0	60	
14	Preston North End	46	15	15	16	55	62	−7	60	
15	Queens Park Rangers	46	16	10	20	61	73	−12	58	
16	Watford	46	14	15	17	53	65	−12	57	
17	Stoke City	46	15	10	21	51	56	−5	55	
18	Portsmouth	46	14	13	19	49	64	−15	55	
19	Charlton Athletic	46	13	14	19	44	58	−14	53	
20	Blackburn Rovers	46	13	13	20	42	56	−14	52	
21	West Bromwich Albion	46	13	14	19	48	58	−10	51 (Note: West Bromwich Albion were deducted two points on 24 April 2026 for breaching PSR rules.)	
22	Oxford United (R)	46	11	14	21	45	59	−14	47	Relegation to EFL League One
23	Leicester City (R)	46	12	16	18	58	68	−10	46 (Note: Leicester City were deducted six points on 5 February 2026 for breaching PSR rules.)	Relegation to EFL League One
24	Sheffield Wednesday (R)	46	2	12	32	29	89	−60	0 (Note: Sheffield Wednesday were deducted twelve points due to filing for administration on 24 October 2025, then deducted a further six points on 1 December 2025 for failing to fulfil payment obligations.)	Relegation to EFL League One

Source: EFL Official Website
Rules for classification: 1) Points; 2) Goal difference; 3) Number of goals scored; 4) Head-to-head results; 5) Wins; 6) Away goals; 7) Penalty points (sec 9.5); 8) Number of 12-point sending off offences; 9) Play-off (only if needed to determine promotion/relegation)
(C) Champions; (D) Disqualified; (O) Play-off winners; (P) Promoted; (R) Relegated

=== Results ===
Home \ Away	BIR	BLA	BRI	CHA	COV	DER	HUL	IPS	LEI	MID	MIL	NOR	OXF	POR	PNE	QPR	SHU	SHW	SOU	STO	SWA	WAT	WBA	WRX
Birmingham City	—	0–1	2–1	1–1	3–2	1–1	2–3	1–1	2–1	1–3	4–0	4–1	1–0	4–0	2–1	1–0	1–1	2–2	1–1	1–1	1–0	2–1	0–0	2–0
Blackburn Rovers	1–2	—	1–2	2–2	1–1	1–2	0–1	1–1	0–1	0–0	2–0	0–2	1–1	1–1	1–0	0–1	1–3	1–0	2–1	1–1	1–2	1–1	0–0	0–2
Bristol City	1–0	0–1	—	0–0	0–2	0–5	4–2	1–1	2–2	2–0	0–1	2–4	1–3	5–0	0–2	1–2	1–0	2–0	3–1	2–0	3–0	1–2	0–1	2–2
Charlton Athletic	1–0	3–0	1–2	—	1–1	1–2	2–1	1–2	0–1	1–2	1–1	0–1	1–0	1–3	1–2	0–0	1–0	2–1	1–5	1–0	1–1	1–0	1–0	0–1
Coventry City	3–0	2–0	1–0	3–1	—	3–2	0–0	0–2	2–1	3–1	2–1	1–1	0–0	5–1	3–0	7–1	3–1	0–0	1–2	2–1	1–0	3–1	3–2	3–1
Derby County	1–0	3–1	1–1	1–1	3–5	—	2–1	1–2	1–3	1–0	1–1	1–0	1–0	1–1	0–1	1–0	1–2	2–1	1–1	2–0	2–0	2–3	1–1	1–2
Hull City	1–1	0–3	2–3	1–1	0–0	4–2	—	0–2	2–1	1–4	1–3	2–1	3–2	3–2	2–2	1–3	1–0	3–1	3–1	0–1	2–1	0–0	1–0	2–0
Ipswich Town	2–1	3–0	2–0	0–3	3–0	2–2	1–0	—	1–1	2–2	1–1	3–1	2–1	2–1	1–1	3–0	5–0	3–1	1–1	1–0	3–0	1–1	1–0	0–0
Leicester City	2–0	0–2	2–0	0–2	0–0	2–1	2–2	3–1	—	1–1	1–1	0–2	1–2	1–1	2–2	1–3	2–3	2–1	3–4	2–1	0–1	1–2	2–1	1–1
Middlesbrough	2–1	0–0	1–1	0–1	2–4	2–1	0–1	2–1	1–1	—	1–2	1–0	0–0	0–1	4–0	3–1	1–0	1–0	4–0	0–0	1–0	5–1	2–1	1–1
Millwall	3–0	1–2	2–1	4–0	0–4	1–0	1–3	0–0	1–0	0–3	—	1–2	2–0	1–3	1–1	2–0	1–1	1–0	3–2	2–0	2–1	1–0	3–0	0–2
Norwich City	1–2	2–0	0–1	1–0	2–1	2–1	0–2	0–2	1–2	1–2	1–2	—	1–1	1–1	2–0	3–1	2–1	2–0	2–1	0–2	1–1	0–1	0–1	2–3
Oxford United	0–2	1–0	0–0	1–1	2–2	1–0	1–1	2–1	2–2	1–1	2–2	0–3	—	0–1	1–2	0–0	0–1	4–1	2–1	0–3	0–1	2–0	2–1	0–1
Portsmouth	1–1	2–1	0–1	2–1	1–2	0–1	0–1	2–0	1–0	1–0	3–1	1–2	2–2	—	1–0	1–1	0–1	0–2	1–1	0–1	1–2	2–2	3–0	0–0
Preston North End	0–1	1–2	0–0	2–0	1–1	0–1	0–3	1–0	2–1	2–2	0–2	1–1	1–3	1–0	—	1–1	3–2	3–0	1–3	3–1	2–1	2–2	0–2	1–1
Queens Park Rangers	2–1	1–3	0–0	3–1	2–1	2–3	3–2	1–4	4–1	0–4	1–2	1–2	0–0	6–1	1–1	—	0–2	3–0	1–2	1–0	1–2	2–1	3–1	2–3
Sheffield United	3–0	1–3	1–4	0–1	1–2	1–3	2–1	3–1	3–1	1–2	0–1	1–1	3–1	3–0	2–3	0–0	—	2–1	1–2	4–0	3–3	1–0	1–1	1–2
Sheffield Wednesday	0–2	0–0	0–3	1–1	0–5	0–3	2–2	0–2	1–1	0–1	1–2	1–1	1–2	0–1	2–3	1–1	0–3	—	1–3	0–3	0–2	1–1	2–1	0–1
Southampton	3–1	3–0	2–2	1–1	1–1	2–1	1–2	2–2	3–0	1–1	0–0	1–0	2–0	0–0	0–2	5–0	1–0	3–1	—	1–2	0–0	1–0	3–2	2–1
Stoke City	1–0	1–1	5–1	3–0	0–1	3–1	1–2	3–3	2–2	1–2	1–3	1–1	2–1	1–3	0–0	0–0	1–2	2–0	0–2	—	2–1	3–1	0–1	1–0
Swansea City	1–1	3–1	1–0	3–1	0–3	1–2	2–2	1–4	1–3	2–2	1–1	2–1	2–0	1–0	1–1	0–1	1–0	4–0	1–2	2–0	—	1–1	1–0	2–1
Watford	3–0	0–1	1–1	1–1	0–4	2–0	2–1	0–2	0–0	3–0	0–2	3–2	2–1	1–1	1–1	2–1	0–2	1–1	2–2	1–0	0–2	—	2–1	3–1
West Bromwich Albion	1–1	1–0	1–2	1–1	0–2	0–1	3–0	0–0	1–1	2–3	0–0	0–5	2–1	1–1	2–1	2–1	2–0	0–0	1–1	0–0	3–2	3–0	—	2–2
Wrexham	1–1	1–1	2–0	1–0	3–2	1–1	1–2	5–3	1–1	2–2	0–2	1–2	1–0	2–1	2–1	1–3	5–3	2–2	1–5	2–0	2–0	2–2	2–3	—

Source: efl.com
Legend: Blue = home team win; Yellow = draw; Red = away team win.
For upcoming matches, an "a" indicates there is an article about the rivalry between the two participants.

=== Bracket ===
Semi-finals
3	Millwall	0	0	0
6	Hull City	0	2	2
4	~~Southampton (a.e.t.)~~	~~0~~	~~2~~	~~2~~
5	Middlesbrough	0	1	1

Final
6	Hull City	1
5	Middlesbrough	0

=== Semi-finals ===
First leg

8 May 2026
20:00 BST

Hull City	0–0	Millwall
	Report

MKM Stadium, Kingston upon Hull
Attendance: 24,623
Referee: Gavin Ward
9 May 2026
12:30 BST

Middlesbrough	0–0	Southampton
	Report

Riverside Stadium, Middlesbrough
Attendance: 32,045
Referee: Farai Hallam

Second leg

11 May 2026
20:00 BST

Millwall	0–2	Hull City
	Report	Belloumi 64'; Gelhardt 79'

The Den, London
Attendance: 17,768
Referee: Sam Barrott

Hull City won 2–0 on aggregate.

12 May 2026
20:00 BST

Southampton	2–1 (a.e.t.)	Middlesbrough
Stewart 45+1'; Charles 116'	Report	McGree 5'

St Mary's Stadium, Southampton
Attendance: 30,277
Referee: Andrew Madley

Southampton won 2–1 on aggregate; however, Middlesbrough advanced to the final on walkover after Southampton were disqualified for spying on other teams (see Southampton F.C. espionage incident).

=== Championship final ===
23 May 2026
15:30 BST

Hull City	1−0	Middlesbrough
McBurnie 90+5'	Report

Wembley Stadium, London
Attendance: 84,506
Referee: Jarred Gillett

== League One ==
=== Table ===
Pos	Team	Pld	W	D	L	GF	GA	GD	Pts	Promotion, qualification or relegation
1	Lincoln City (C, P)	46	31	10	5	89	41	+48	103	Promotion to EFL Championship
2	Cardiff City (P)	46	27	10	9	90	50	+40	91	Promotion to EFL Championship
3	Stockport County	46	22	11	13	71	58	+13	77	Qualification for League One play-offs
4	Bradford City	46	22	11	13	58	51	+7	77	Qualification for League One play-offs
5	Bolton Wanderers (O, P)	46	19	18	9	70	52	+18	75	Qualification for League One play-offs
6	Stevenage	46	21	12	13	49	46	+3	75	Qualification for League One play-offs
7	Luton Town	46	21	11	14	68	56	+12	74	
8	Plymouth Argyle	46	22	7	17	75	63	+12	73	
9	Huddersfield Town	46	18	13	15	74	64	+10	67	
10	Mansfield Town	46	16	17	13	62	50	+12	65	
11	Wycombe Wanderers	46	17	12	17	69	58	+11	63	
12	Reading	46	16	15	15	64	60	+4	63	
13	Blackpool	46	17	9	20	54	65	−11	60	
14	Doncaster Rovers	46	17	9	20	50	69	−19	60	
15	Barnsley	46	15	14	17	68	73	−5	59	
16	Wigan Athletic	46	14	14	18	49	58	−9	56	
17	Burton Albion	46	13	15	18	50	60	−10	54	
18	Peterborough United	46	15	8	23	64	68	−4	53	
19	AFC Wimbledon	46	15	8	23	51	72	−21	53	
20	Leyton Orient	46	14	10	22	59	71	−12	52	
21	Exeter City (R)	46	12	13	21	52	61	−9	49	Relegation to EFL League Two
22	Port Vale (R)	46	10	12	24	36	61	−25	42	Relegation to EFL League Two
23	Rotherham United (R)	46	10	11	25	41	71	−30	41	Relegation to EFL League Two
24	Northampton Town (R)	46	9	8	29	39	74	−35	35	Relegation to EFL League Two

Source: EFL Official Website
Rules for classification: 1) Points; 2) Goal difference; 3) Number of goals scored; 4) Head-to-head results; 5) Wins; 6) Away goals; 7) Penalty points (sec 9.5); 8) 12-point sending off offences
(C) Champions; (O) Play-off winners; (P) Promoted; (R) Relegated

=== Results ===
Home \ Away	WIM	BAR	BLP	BOL	BRA	BRT	CAR	DON	EXE	HUD	LEY	LIN	LUT	MAN	NOR	PET	PLY	PVL	REA	ROT	STE	STK	WIG	WYC
AFC Wimbledon	—	2–0	4–1	0–1	3–1	0–1	0–1	0–1	0–1	0–4	2–4	2–0	0–3	0–0	1–0	1–1	1–3	1–1	3–2	2–1	0–0	0–2	1–2	2–1
Barnsley	3–3	—	2–1	1–1	2–2	3–2	1–1	0–1	2–1	3–1	3–2	0–2	5–0	2–3	2–2	2–1	0–3	0–2	3–2	0–1	3–1	1–3	1–1	0–1
Blackpool	0–2	1–0	—	1–1	1–2	1–0	3–1	1–0	1–0	3–2	1–0	2–2	2–2	1–0	2–0	3–1	0–4	3–2	0–3	4–0	2–3	1–2	1–1	1–1
Bolton Wanderers	3–0	3–2	2–2	—	0–0	2–1	1–0	0–0	2–1	3–3	2–1	1–1	2–3	0–1	0–0	2–1	2–0	4–0	1–1	2–1	5–1	2–2	4–1	3–2
Bradford City	3–2	2–2	1–0	1–1	—	1–2	1–2	1–0	1–0	3–1	2–1	0–0	2–1	1–1	1–0	2–0	1–1	1–0	2–0	1–0	0–1	1–0	2–1	2–1
Burton Albion	1–0	1–1	1–0	3–0	2–1	—	2–2	1–2	1–1	3–1	0–4	0–1	0–3	2–1	5–1	0–1	0–4	0–0	1–2	1–0	0–1	3–0	0–2	0–0
Cardiff City	4–1	4–0	0–0	2–0	1–3	0–1	—	4–3	1–0	3–2	4–3	0–2	3–1	3–0	5–1	2–1	4–0	1–0	2–1	3–0	2–1	1–1	1–0	0–2
Doncaster Rovers	1–2	1–2	2–1	1–1	3–1	1–1	0–4	—	1–0	1–0	3–0	0–2	1–1	0–2	1–2	2–1	1–5	1–0	1–0	1–0	1–1	0–2	3–3	1–1
Exeter City	1–0	3–0	4–1	1–5	1–2	1–1	0–4	3–0	—	0–1	0–0	0–1	1–0	1–2	0–0	3–0	2–0	0–2	1–1	0–4	3–0	3–3	1–1	1–1
Huddersfield Town	3–3	2–1	2–2	1–2	1–0	0–0	1–1	2–0	2–2	—	3–0	2–2	1–0	1–4	2–0	3–2	3–1	5–0	1–1	1–0	1–0	1–2	1–1	3–3
Leyton Orient	1–3	1–3	1–1	1–1	2–1	2–2	1–1	4–0	2–1	1–2	—	1–0	1–1	0–0	0–1	2–1	1–3	0–1	3–1	0–2	2–3	2–2	2–0	2–0
Lincoln City	1–0	3–1	4–0	1–1	3–0	2–1	2–1	2–1	0–1	1–1	2–1	—	3–1	1–1	4–0	5–2	3–2	1–0	2–0	3–0	1–0	3–1	2–2	4–3
Luton Town	1–0	2–1	1–0	1–1	2–1	1–1	0–1	1–0	3–2	2–1	3–0	2–2	—	0–2	2–1	2–1	2–3	2–2	2–3	0–0	2–1	1–1	1–0	4–0
Mansfield Town	2–2	2–2	2–0	0–1	3–0	0–0	5–4	1–2	0–0	1–3	4–1	0–2	2–2	—	4–1	1–2	2–0	3–0	1–0	2–1	1–1	1–2	1–1	0–0
Northampton Town	3–1	0–1	1–0	2–0	0–0	0–2	1–3	1–3	2–0	1–1	1–2	0–1	0–1	2–1	—	1–1	2–3	0–1	0–2	1–2	3–1	0–0	1–3	1–2
Peterborough United	5–0	0–1	1–2	3–1	1–1	1–1	1–1	1–3	3–3	2–3	1–0	0–3	0–2	0–0	2–1	—	0–1	1–3	1–1	5–0	0–1	3–0	6–1	2–1
Plymouth Argyle	1–2	1–3	1–0	1–2	0–1	3–0	5–2	2–1	2–2	3–1	0–1	1–4	1–0	1–1	0–3	0–1	—	2–1	1–4	1–0	1–0	4–2	1–1	1–1
Port Vale	0–1	0–0	5–1	1–0	0–2	2–2	0–0	0–1	1–3	0–0	2–3	0–2	1–1	2–1	0–0	0–1	0–1	—	1–1	1–0	1–2	0–3	0–0	0–0
Reading	1–2	2–2	0–1	1–1	2–1	2–0	1–3	1–1	2–2	0–2	2–1	1–2	3–2	1–1	1–0	1–2	2–2	1–0	—	1–1	1–0	1–0	3–0	3–2
Rotherham United	1–1	1–3	0–3	2–2	2–2	2–2	0–3	1–2	1–0	1–3	1–0	3–0	0–2	0–0	2–1	0–2	1–0	2–1	1–1	—	0–0	0–1	2–2	1–1
Stevenage	1–0	1–0	1–0	0–0	1–1	2–2	0–1	0–0	2–1	1–0	1–2	2–2	2–0	1–1	2–0	1–0	1–1	2–1	1–0	1–0	—	2–1	1–0	1–0
Stockport County	3–0	1–1	1–0	2–0	1–2	2–1	1–1	4–2	1–0	1–0	0–0	1–2	0–3	0–1	2–1	3–1	2–1	1–2	1–1	3–2	1–3	—	4–2	3–0
Wigan Athletic	0–1	1–1	0–2	0–1	2–0	1–0	0–2	3–0	2–0	1–0	0–0	0–1	1–0	2–1	3–1	2–0	0–3	1–0	1–2	3–0	0–0	1–1	—	0–1
Wycombe Wanderers	2–0	2–2	0–1	2–1	1–2	3–0	1–1	4–0	0–1	3–0	4–1	3–2	1–2	2–0	2–0	0–2	0–1	4–0	2–2	3–2	3–1	1–2	2–0	—

Source: BBC Sport
Legend: Blue = home team win; Yellow = draw; Red = away team win.
For upcoming matches, an "a" indicates there is an article about the rivalry between the two participants.

=== Bracket ===
Semi-finals
6	Stevenage	0	0	0
3	Stockport County	1	2	3
5	Bolton Wanderers	1	1	2
4	Bradford City	0	0	0

Final
3	Stockport County	1
5	Bolton Wanderers	4

=== Semi-finals ===
First leg

9 May 2026
15:00 BST

Stevenage	0–1	Stockport County
	Report	Osborn 90+4'

Broadhall Way, Stevenage
Attendance: 7,321
Referee: Charles Breakspear
9 May 2026
20:00 BST

Bolton Wanderers	1–0	Bradford City
Cozier-Duberry 60'	Report

Toughsheet Community Stadium, Bolton
Attendance: 22,789
Referee: Martin Coy

Second leg

13 May 2026
20:00 BST

Stockport County	2–0	Stevenage
Barry 14'; Wootton 28'	Report

Edgeley Park, Stockport
Attendance: 10,243
Referee: Josh Smith

Stockport County won 3–0 on aggregate.

14 May 2026
20:00 BST

Bradford City	0–1	Bolton Wanderers
	Report	Simons 81'

University of Bradford Stadium, Bradford
Attendance: 22,381
Referee: Thomas Kirk

Bolton Wanderers won 2–0 on aggregate.

=== Final ===
24 May 2026
13:00 BST

Stockport County	1–4	Bolton Wanderers
Sidibeh 29'	Report	Rodrigues 3', 90+4' (pen.); Wootton 64' (o.g.); Dalby 81'

Wembley Stadium, London
Attendance: 48,268
Referee: Josh Smith

== League Two ==
=== Table ===
Pos	Team	Pld	W	D	L	GF	GA	GD	Pts	Promotion, qualification or relegation
1	Bromley (C, P)	46	24	15	7	71	46	+25	87	Promotion to EFL League One
2	Milton Keynes Dons (P)	46	24	14	8	86	45	+41	86	Promotion to EFL League One
3	Cambridge United (P)	46	22	16	8	66	33	+33	82	Promotion to EFL League One
4	Salford City	46	25	6	15	61	51	+10	81	Qualification for League Two play-offs
5	Notts County (O, P)	46	24	8	14	74	52	+22	80	Qualification for League Two play-offs
6	Chesterfield	46	21	16	9	71	56	+15	79	Qualification for League Two play-offs
7	Grimsby Town	46	22	12	12	74	50	+24	78	Qualification for League Two play-offs
8	Barnet	46	21	13	12	70	53	+17	76	
9	Swindon Town	46	22	9	15	70	59	+11	75	
10	Oldham Athletic	46	18	14	14	60	44	+16	68	
11	Crewe Alexandra	46	19	10	17	64	58	+6	67	
12	Colchester United	46	18	12	16	62	49	+13	66	
13	Walsall	46	18	11	17	56	56	0	65	
14	Bristol Rovers	46	19	5	22	56	65	−9	62	
15	Fleetwood Town	46	15	16	15	57	58	−1	61	
16	Accrington Stanley	46	14	11	21	47	58	−11	53	
17	Gillingham	46	13	14	19	53	72	−19	53	
18	Cheltenham Town	46	14	10	22	53	79	−26	52	
19	Shrewsbury Town	46	13	10	23	42	69	−27	49	
20	Newport County	46	12	7	27	48	77	−29	43	
21	Tranmere Rovers	46	10	11	25	54	79	−25	41	
22	Crawley Town	46	8	16	22	44	68	−24	40	
23	Harrogate Town (R)	46	10	9	27	39	68	−29	39	Relegation to National League
24	Barrow (R)	46	9	9	28	45	78	−33	36	Relegation to National League

Source: EFL Official Website
Rules for classification: 1) Points; 2) Goal difference; 3) Number of goals scored; 4) Head-to-head results; 5) Wins; 6) Away goals; 7) Penalty points (sec 9.5); 8) 12-point sending off offences
(C) Champions; (O) Play-off winners; (P) Promoted; (R) Relegated

=== Results ===
Home \ Away	ACC	BNT	BRW	BRV	BRM	CAM	CHT	CHF	COL	CRA	CRE	FLE	GIL	GRI	HAR	MKD	NPC	NTC	OLD	SAL	SHR	SWI	TRA	WAL
Accrington Stanley	—	0–1	2–1	3–1	0–1	1–1	3–1	0–1	1–0	3–3	2–0	1–2	1–1	1–1	1–0	0–2	0–1	0–4	1–0	1–0	0–2	4–0	1–1	1–3
Barnet	2–0	—	3–2	4–0	2–2	1–0	0–0	1–0	1–1	2–1	1–1	0–2	6–2	3–0	1–1	2–2	1–2	0–1	3–2	1–3	1–3	1–2	1–0	1–2
Barrow	0–0	2–2	—	0–2	2–1	0–2	1–2	0–1	1–0	0–1	1–0	0–1	0–1	2–2	0–1	0–2	1–2	2–1	3–2	1–2	0–0	1–3	0–3	1–3
Bristol Rovers	2–0	0–2	2–1	—	2–3	1–0	4–0	2–3	0–1	3–1	2–1	1–0	0–1	3–1	0–1	0–4	3–0	0–1	0–0	2–1	1–0	0–3	1–4	2–0
Bromley	2–1	2–0	2–1	1–0	—	0–0	1–1	2–2	1–0	3–1	2–2	2–2	2–2	2–0	2–0	2–1	2–1	1–1	0–0	2–0	2–1	2–1	3–3	3–1
Cambridge United	2–0	0–0	3–0	3–1	2–1	—	1–0	1–1	1–1	3–1	2–1	2–1	5–0	1–2	1–1	1–1	2–0	4–0	0–1	1–0	1–0	1–1	4–2	2–0
Cheltenham Town	1–0	0–1	2–2	1–0	1–2	1–1	—	0–2	1–4	3–0	1–1	2–0	2–1	0–2	1–1	2–3	1–0	1–2	0–3	3–2	3–1	0–2	1–3	1–0
Chesterfield	3–3	3–1	1–0	3–1	0–0	0–1	1–0	—	3–0	2–2	2–0	1–1	1–0	2–1	1–1	1–1	4–1	2–0	0–3	2–0	2–3	1–2	1–1	2–2
Colchester United	2–1	4–1	0–2	1–1	0–2	1–2	2–0	6–2	—	0–0	1–1	2–1	0–0	0–1	3–1	1–0	4–1	0–1	1–3	0–1	2–0	3–0	1–1	1–1
Crawley Town	1–1	1–1	1–2	4–0	1–3	0–3	2–0	1–1	1–1	—	0–1	2–1	2–0	0–2	2–0	1–1	1–2	1–2	2–2	0–0	0–0	2–2	0–2	1–1
Crewe Alexandra	2–0	1–2	3–1	1–1	0–1	0–0	4–1	3–3	1–0	1–0	—	0–1	1–0	3–2	1–1	1–3	2–2	2–1	2–1	1–0	3–1	0–3	2–1	0–3
Fleetwood Town	2–1	2–5	3–2	2–1	1–2	1–2	2–2	1–1	4–2	1–0	1–4	—	2–1	0–1	3–2	1–1	0–0	1–2	1–1	1–1	3–1	1–1	0–0	1–1
Gillingham	2–0	1–1	2–2	1–2	1–4	1–1	1–1	4–1	1–1	2–2	1–0	1–1	—	1–4	0–1	1–5	3–2	1–0	0–3	1–2	1–0	0–2	2–1	1–0
Grimsby Town	1–0	1–0	5–0	0–1	1–1	1–1	7–1	0–1	1–2	3–0	3–2	1–0	1–0	—	1–3	2–2	2–1	0–2	0–0	3–1	1–0	4–0	1–2	2–2
Harrogate Town	0–2	1–2	1–0	2–3	0–0	2–1	1–1	1–2	1–0	0–1	1–2	1–2	0–3	3–3	—	0–4	0–3	0–2	0–1	0–1	2–0	0–1	0–2	0–2
Milton Keynes Dons	1–2	1–3	0–0	1–0	2–1	1–1	5–0	2–2	1–0	0–0	3–1	2–1	3–2	2–3	4–1	—	1–0	1–1	0–0	2–0	5–1	1–0	3–0	0–1
Newport County	1–4	0–0	2–2	2–3	0–1	0–2	0–2	2–1	1–2	0–2	2–0	0–2	1–3	0–0	2–1	1–2	—	1–1	3–2	0–1	1–0	0–1	3–1	2–4
Notts County	0–1	1–2	2–1	1–1	2–2	2–0	5–2	2–3	1–3	4–0	1–0	1–0	1–0	0–1	1–1	3–2	3–1	—	3–1	1–2	4–1	2–1	5–0	0–0
Oldham Athletic	3–0	1–1	0–0	2–0	1–0	0–3	2–1	1–1	1–1	2–0	0–0	1–1	0–1	1–0	1–0	1–1	3–0	3–0	—	1–2	2–2	1–2	3–1	0–1
Salford City	2–1	2–0	3–1	1–0	2–0	0–0	1–1	0–1	4–3	4–3	1–3	0–0	0–0	0–2	1–0	1–0	1–3	2–1	1–0	—	1–2	3–2	3–1	1–0
Shrewsbury Town	0–0	0–0	2–1	0–3	0–0	2–0	0–2	0–1	0–2	1–0	0–4	2–2	3–3	1–1	1–0	1–2	1–0	1–0	1–0	1–3	—	3–1	1–0	1–2
Swindon Town	2–2	0–2	3–1	1–1	2–0	3–2	0–1	1–2	0–0	1–0	1–2	1–1	2–0	2–2	3–1	1–2	2–0	2–2	3–0	2–3	2–1	—	2–1	2–1
Tranmere Rovers	0–1	0–2	1–3	1–2	0–2	0–0	3–2	1–1	0–1	2–0	1–4	1–0	1–1	1–1	0–3	2–2	1–1	1–2	1–3	0–2	4–0	0–1	—	1–3
Walsall	0–0	1–3	1–2	2–1	3–1	0–0	0–4	1–0	0–2	0–0	1–0	0–1	2–2	0–1	0–2	0–2	2–1	1–2	1–2	1–0	1–1	2–1	4–2	—

Source: BBC Sport
Legend: Blue = home team win; Yellow = draw; Red = away team win.
For upcoming matches, an "a" indicates there is an article about the rivalry between the two participants.

=== Bracket ===
Semi-finals
4	Salford City (a.e.t.)	2	2	4
7	Grimsby Town	1	2	3
5	Notts County	1	0	1
6	Chesterfield	0	0	0

Final
4	Salford City	0
5	Notts County	3

=== Semi-finals ===
First leg

10 May 2026
15:00 BST

Grimsby Town	1–2	Salford City
Staunton 1'	Report	Cesay 4'; Oluwo 40'

Blundell Park, Cleethorpes
Attendance: 8,115
Referee: Matthew Corlett
10 May 2026
18:00 BST

Chesterfield	0–1	Notts County
	Report	Luker 28'

SMH Group Stadium, Chesterfield
Attendance: 10,014
Referee: Will Finnie

Second leg

15 May 2026
19:15 BST

Salford City	2–2 (a.e.t.)	Grimsby Town
Udoh 53'; Cesay 117'	Report	Green 74'; Kabia 78'

The Peninsula Stadium, Salford
Attendance: 4,500
Referee: Ben Speedie

Salford City won 4–3 on aggregate.

15 May 2026
20:00 BST

Notts County	0–0	Chesterfield
	Report

Meadow Lane, Nottingham
Attendance: 17,224
Referee: Thomas Parsons

Notts County won 1–0 on aggregate.

=== Final ===
25 May 2026
15:00 BST

Salford City	0–3	Notts County
	Report	Jatta 32'; Ness 45'; Jones 70'

Wembley Stadium, London
Attendance: 30,851
Referee: Tom Reeves

== Managerial changes ==
Team	Outgoing manager	Manner of departure	Date of vacancy	Position in table	Incoming manager	Date of appointment	Position in table
Huddersfield Town	(Northern Ireland) Michael Duff	Sacked	9 March 2025	2024–25 English Football League	(England) Lee Grant	28 May 2025	Pre-season
Southampton	(Croatia) Ivan Jurić	Mutual consent	7 April 2025	2024–25 Premier League	(Belgium) Will Still	25 May 2025	Pre-season
Cardiff City	(Turkey) Omer Riza	Sacked	19 April 2025	2024–25 English Football League	(Republic of Ireland) Brian Barry-Murphy	16 June 2025	Pre-season
West Bromwich Albion	(England) Tony Mowbray	Sacked	21 April 2025	2024–25 English Football League	(England) Ryan Mason	2 June 2025	Pre-season
Norwich City	(Denmark) Johannes Hoff Thorup	Sacked	22 April 2025	2024–25 English Football League	(England) Liam Manning	3 June 2025	Pre-season
Newport County	(Portugal) Nelson Jardim	Mutual consent	24 April 2025	2024–25 English Football League	(Wales) David Hughes	23 May 2025	Pre-season
Bristol Rovers	(Spain) Iñigo Calderón	Sacked	4 May 2025	Pre-season	(England) Darrell Clarke	6 May 2025	Pre-season
Watford	(England) Tom Cleverley	Sacked	6 May 2025	Pre-season	(Uruguay) Paulo Pezzolano	13 May 2025	Pre-season
Hull City	(Spain) Rubén Sellés	Sacked	15 May 2025	Pre-season	(Bosnia and Herzegovina) Sergej Jakirović	11 June 2025	Pre-season
Notts County	(England) Stuart Maynard	Sacked	22 May 2025	Pre-season	(Northern Ireland) Martin Paterson	22 June 2025	Pre-season
Plymouth Argyle	(Austria) Miron Muslić	Signed by Schalke 04	31 May 2025	Pre-season	(England) Tom Cleverley	13 June 2025	Pre-season
Bristol City	(England) Liam Manning	Signed by Norwich City	3 June 2025	Pre-season	(Austria) Gerhard Struber	19 June 2025	Pre-season
Middlesbrough	(England) Michael Carrick	Sacked	4 June 2025	Pre-season	(Wales) Rob Edwards	24 June 2025	Pre-season
Sheffield United	(England) Chris Wilder	Mutual consent	18 June 2025	Pre-season	(Spain) Rubén Sellés	18 June 2025	Pre-season
Queens Park Rangers	(Spain) Martí Cifuentes	Mutual consent	24 June 2025	Pre-season	(France) Julien Stéphan	25 June 2025	Pre-season
Leicester City	(Netherlands) Ruud van Nistelrooy	Mutual consent	27 June 2025	Pre-season	(Spain) Martí Cifuentes	15 July 2025	Pre-season
Sheffield Wednesday	(Germany) Danny Röhl	Mutual consent	29 July 2025	Pre-season	(Denmark) Henrik Pedersen	31 July 2025	Pre-season
Sheffield United	(Spain) Rubén Sellés	Sacked	14 September 2025	24th	(England) Chris Wilder	15 September 2025	24th
Wycombe Wanderers	(England) Mike Dodds	Sacked	18 September 2025	19th	(Northern Ireland) Michael Duff	18 September 2025	19th
Cheltenham Town	(Wales) Michael Flynn	Sacked	20 September 2025	24th	(England) Steve Cotterill	30 September 2025	24th
Blackpool	(England) Steve Bruce	Sacked	4 October 2025	23rd	(England) Ian Evatt	21 October 2025	24th
Luton Town	(England) Matt Bloomfield	Sacked	6 October 2025	11th	(England) Jack Wilshere	13 October 2025	11th
Watford	(Uruguay) Paulo Pezzolano	Sacked	8 October 2025	11th	(Spain) Javi Gracia	8 October 2025	11th
Peterborough United	(Scotland) Darren Ferguson	Sacked	25 October 2025	24th	(England) Luke Williams	29 October 2025	24th
Reading	(Republic of Ireland) Noel Hunt	Sacked	26 October 2025	19th	(England) Leam Richardson	28 October 2025	19th
Southampton	(Belgium) Will Still	Sacked	2 November 2025	21st	(Germany) Tonda Eckert	12 November 2025	21st
Norwich City	(England) Liam Manning	Sacked	8 November 2025	23rd	(Belgium) Philippe Clement	18 November 2025	23rd
Swansea City	(Republic of Ireland) Alan Sheehan	Sacked	11 November 2025	18th	(Portugal) Vítor Matos	24 November 2025	20th
Middlesbrough	(Wales) Rob Edwards	Signed by Wolverhampton Wanderers	12 November 2025	2nd	(Sweden) Kim Hellberg	24 November 2025	2nd
Newport County	(Wales) David Hughes	Sacked	15 November 2025	24th	(Austria) Christian Fuchs	20 November 2025	24th
Barrow	(England) Andy Whing	Sacked	10 December 2025	18th	(Scotland) Paul Gallagher	2 January 2026	19th
Bristol Rovers	(England) Darrell Clarke	Sacked	13 December 2025	23rd	(Scotland) Steve Evans	16 December 2025	23rd
Oxford United	(England) Gary Rowett	Sacked	23 December 2025	22nd	(England) Matt Bloomfield	9 January 2026	23rd
Port Vale	(Jamaica) Darren Moore	Sacked	28 December 2025	24th	(Australia) Jon Brady	6 January 2026	24th
West Bromwich Albion	(England) Ryan Mason	Sacked	6 January 2026	18th	(Wales) Eric Ramsay	11 January 2026	18th
Huddersfield Town	(England) Lee Grant	Sacked	17 January 2026	6th	(England) Liam Manning	20 January 2026	6th
Leicester City	(Spain) Martí Cifuentes	Sacked	25 January 2026	14th	(England) Gary Rowett	18 February 2026	22nd
Fleetwood Town	(England) Pete Wild	Sacked	25 January 2026	15th	(England) Matt Lawlor (Note: Lawlor was initially appointed interim head coach on 26 January 2026, before being appointed head coach permanently on 17 March 2026.)	26 January 2026	15th
Shrewsbury Town	(England) Michael Appleton	Mutual consent	28 January 2026	21st	(England) Gavin Cowan	29 January 2026	21st
Watford	(Spain) Javi Gracia	Resigned	1 February 2026	10th	(England) Edward Still	9 February 2026	11th
Blackburn Rovers	(France) Valérien Ismaël	Mutual consent	2 February 2026	22nd	(Northern Ireland) Michael O'Neill	13 February 2026	22nd
Wigan Athletic	(England) Ryan Lowe	Sacked	7 February 2026	22nd	(Scotland) Gary Caldwell	16 February 2026	22nd
Barrow	(Scotland) Paul Gallagher	Sacked	11 February 2026	22nd	(Tunisia) Dino Maamria	11 February 2026	22nd
Exeter City	(Scotland) Gary Caldwell	Signed by Wigan Athletic	16 February 2026	14th	(England) Matt Taylor	3 March 2026	15th
West Bromwich Albion	(Wales) Eric Ramsay	Sacked	24 February 2026	21st	(Scotland) James Morrison (Note: Morrison was appointed interim head coach until the end of the season on 4 March 2026, before being appointed on a permanent basis on 30 April 2026.)	24 February 2026	21st
Northampton Town	(England) Kevin Nolan	Sacked	9 March 2026	23rd			
Tranmere Rovers	(England) Andy Crosby	Sacked	4 March 2026	19th	(England) Pete Wild (interim)	10 March 2026	20th
Walsall	(England) Mat Sadler	Sacked	11 March 2026	11th	(Jamaica) Darren Byfield (interim)	11 March 2026	10th
Barrow	(Tunisia) Dino Maamria	Sacked	11 March 2026	22nd	(Republic of Ireland) Sam Foley (interim)	11 March 2026	23rd
Rotherham United	(England) Matt Hamshaw	Sacked	18 March 2026	22nd	(England) Lee Clark	18 March 2026	22nd
Crawley Town	(England) Scott Lindsey	Sacked	22 March 2026	21st	(Turkey) Colin Kazim-Richards	24 March 2026	21st
Bristol City	(Austria) Gerhard Struber	Sacked	27 March 2026	16th	(England) Roy Hodgson (interim)	27 March 2026	13th
