= 2025–26 Notts County F.C. season =

162nd season in existence of Notts County FC

Notts County
2025–26 season
- Owner: Alexander and Christoffer Reedtz
- Chairman: Christoffer Reedtz
- Head Coach: Martin Paterson
- Stadium: Meadow Lane
- League Two: 5th
- FA Cup: First round
- EFL Cup: First round
- EFL Trophy: Group stage
- Play-offs: Winners
- Top goalscorer: League: Alassana Jatta (16); All: Alassana Jatta (16); Matthew Dennis (16)
- Highest home attendance: 17,224 v Chesterfield (15 May 2026, Play-off semi-final)
- Lowest home attendance: 1,822 v Barnsley (30 Sept 2025, EFL Trophy)
- Average home league attendance: 10,715
- Biggest win: 5–0 v Tranmere Rovers (Home, 21 Feb 2026, League Two)
- Biggest defeat: 4–0 v Cambridge United (Away, 11 Apr 2026, League Two)

The 2025–26 season was the 162nd season in the history of Notts County Football Club and their third consecutive season in League Two. In addition to the domestic league, the club also participated in the FA Cup, the EFL Cup, the EFL Trophy and the League Two play-offs - the latter of which they won.

Prior to the season starting, the club appointed Martin Paterson as the new Head Coach.

== Transfers and contracts ==
=== In ===
Date	Pos.	Player	From	Fee	Ref.
1 July 2025 (Note: The transfer was announced on 4 June, and would become official on July 1 once his contract at Carlisle had expired)	CF	(England) Matthew Dennis	(England) Carlisle United	Free	
1 July 2025 (Note: The transfer was announced on 30 June, and would become official on July 1 once his contract at Nottingham Forest had expired)	GK	(England) Harry Griffiths	(England) Nottingham Forest	Free	
1 July 2025 (Note: The transfer was announced on 16 June, and would become official on July 1 once his contract at York had expired)	RW	(Afghanistan) Maziar Kouhyar	(England) York City	Free	
1 July 2025 (Note: The transfer was announced on 16 June, and would become official on July 1 once his contract at Blackpool had expired)	CM	(Grenada) Oliver Norburn	(England) Blackpool	Free	
22 July 2025	GK	(Netherlands) Kelle Roos	(Italy) Triestina	Free	
29 July 2025	LWB	(Germany) Keanan Bennetts	Austria Klagenfurt	Free	
7 January 2026	CB	(Republic of Ireland) Luke Browne	(England) Crystal Palace	Undisclosed	
9 January 2026	CF	(Cameroon) Beck-Ray Enoru	(England) Tamworth	Undisclosed	
13 January 2026	GK	(England) James Belshaw	(England) Harrogate Town	Undisclosed	
24 January 2026	CF	(Zimbabwe) Lee Ndlovu	(England) Barnet	Undisclosed	

=== Out ===
Date	Pos.	Player	To	Fee	Ref.
30 June 2025	GK	(England) Alex Bass	(England) Peterborough United	Undisclosed	
16 January 2026	RWB	(England) Kellan Gordon	(England) Crawley Town	Undisclosed	
5 February 2026	LW	(England) Will Jarvis	(Republic of Ireland) Shelbourne	Undisclosed (Note: Includes a 25% sell-on clause)	

=== Loaned in ===
Date	Pos.	Player	From	Date until	Ref.
10 June 2025	CM	(England) Tom Iorpenda	(England) Huddersfield Town	31 May 2026	
4 July 2025	RB	(Republic of Ireland) Barry Cotter	(England) Barnsley	31 May 2026	
10 July 2025	CB	(England) Sonny Aljofree	(England) Manchester United	2 January 2026 (Note: On 2 January, Aljofree was recalled to his parent club Manchester United)	
29 July 2025	CM	(England) Jayden Luker	(England) Luton Town	31 May 2026	
4 August 2025	CM	(Jamaica) Tyrese Hall	(England) Tottenham Hotspur	31 May 2026	
26 January 2026	CAM	(Norway) Harald Nilsen Tangen	(Norway) Sarpsborg 08	31 May 2026 (Note: Option to make the move permanent when loan deal ends)	

=== Loaned out ===
Date	Pos.	Player	To	Date until	Ref.
4 July 2025	LM	(Spain) Madou Cisse	(England) Hereford	31 May 2026	
4 July 2025	CF	(England) Charlie Gill	(England) Alfreton Town	2 January 2026	
5 August 2025	CM	(England) Ryley Reynolds	(England) Kidderminster Harriers	31 May 2026	
1 October 2025	CDM	(England) Jack Hinchy	(England) Altrincham	11 December 2025 (Note: On 11 December, Hinchy was recalled from his loan at Altrincham)	
21 November 2025	CF	(England) Harrison Iwunze	(England) Kettering Town	20 December 2025	
21 November 2025	CB	(Wales) Theo Robinson	(England) Kettering Town	20 December 2025	
15 January 2026	GK	(Netherlands) Kelle Roos	(Scotland) Kilmarnock	31 May 2026	
18 January 2026	CF	(Guinea) Maï Traoré	(Republic of Ireland) Sligo Rovers	30 June 2026	
21 February 2026	CM	(England) Harrison Hazard	(England) Basford United	21 March 2026	
3 March 2026	CDM	(England) Jack Hinchy	(England) Wealdstone	26 April 2026	

=== Released / Out of Contract ===
Date	Pos.	Player	Subsequent club	Join date	Ref.
30 June 2025	LM	(England) Sam Austin	(England) Southend United	1 July 2025	
30 June 2025	CB	(Scotland) Kyle Cameron	(England) Bromley	1 July 2025	
30 June 2025	CB	(England) Robbie Cundy	(England) Cheltenham Town	1 July 2025	
30 June 2025	CAM	(England) Charlie Whitaker	(England) Tranmere Rovers	1 July 2025	
30 June 2025	CF	(Republic of Ireland) David McGoldrick	(England) Barnsley	9 July 2025	
30 June 2025	CF	(England) Junior Morias	(England) Yeovil Town	5 August 2025	
30 June 2025	CF	(Saint Kitts and Nevis) Diego Edwards	(England) Belper Town	9 August 2025	
30 June 2025	GK	(United States) Tyler Miller	(England) Bolton Wanderers	13 August 2025	
30 June 2025	CB	(England) Archie Aves			
30 June 2025	LB	(Zimbabwe) Adam Chicksen			
30 June 2025	GK	(England) Sam Slocombe	Retired		
2 September 2025	CAM	(England) Curtis Edwards			

=== New Contract ===
Date	Pos.	Player	Contracted until	Ref.
14 November 2025	CDM	(Scotland) Scott Robertson	30 June 2029	
10 April 2026	CM	(England) Ryley Reynolds	30 June 2028 (Note: Option for a further year in the club's favour)	
16 April 2026	CF	(England) Harrison Iwunze	30 June 2027	

== Pre-season and friendlies ==
On 10 June, Notts County announced a pre-season training camp in Germany along with a friendly against Darmstadt. A day later, a second fixture during the camp was confirmed against Kaiserslautern. A trip to face Alfreton Town was also added. On 16 June, a third friendly during the Germany training camp was announced, against Stuttgarter Kickers. A behind-closed-doors meeting with Peterborough United was also confirmed. A sixth and final fixture was confirmed against Cardiff City.

Win Draw Loss Fixtures

5 July 2025 Friendly	Alfreton Town	0–1	Notts County	Alfreton
15:00 BST		Report	Macari 84'	Stadium: North Street

9 July 2025 Friendly	Darmstadt	2–1	Notts County	Darmstadt, Germany
18:30 CEST	Hornby 14', 21'	Report	Grant 78'	Stadium: Merck-Stadion am Böllenfalltor

12 July 2025 Friendly	Kaiserslautern	4–0	Notts County	Kaiserslautern, Germany
13:30 CEST	Prtajin 1'; Redondo 8'; Emreli 10'; Haas 82'	Report		Stadium: Fritz-Walter-Stadion

15 July 2025 Friendly	Stuttgarter Kickers	1–1	Notts County	Stuttgart, Germany
19:00 CEST	Abdullahu 81'	Report	McDonald 42'	Stadium: Gazi-Stadion auf der Waldau

19 July 2025 Friendly	Port Vale	1–3	Notts County	Burslem
14:00 BST	Byers 25'	Report	Jones 7'; Jatta 82' (pen.), 86'	Stadium: Vale Park; Attendance: 0 (behind closed doors)

22 July 2025 Friendly	Peterborough United	Cancelled	Notts County	Peterborough
13:30 BST				Stadium: Bespoke Builds Training Ground
Note: Fixture was cancelled on 1 July.

26 July 2025 Friendly	Notts County	2–2	Cardiff City	Nottingham
15:00 BST	Cotter 52'; Jatta 82'	Report	Salech 38'; Robinson 77'	Stadium: Meadow Lane; Attendance: 3,392 (699 away)

== Competitions ==
=== League Two ===
==== League table ====
Pos	Team	Pld	W	D	L	GF	GA	GD	Pts	Promotion, qualification or relegation
3	Cambridge United (P)	46	22	16	8	66	33	+33	82	Promotion to EFL League One
4	Salford City	46	25	6	15	61	51	+10	81	Qualification for League Two play-offs
5	Notts County (O, P)	46	24	8	14	74	52	+22	80	Qualification for League Two play-offs
6	Chesterfield	46	21	16	9	71	56	+15	79	Qualification for League Two play-offs
7	Grimsby Town	46	22	12	12	74	50	+24	78	Qualification for League Two play-offs

Source: EFL Official Website
Rules for classification: 1) Points; 2) Goal difference; 3) Number of goals scored; 4) Head-to-head results; 5) Wins; 6) Away goals; 7) Penalty points (sec 9.5); 8) 12-point sending off offences
(O) Play-off winners; (P) Promoted

==== Results summary ====
Overall								Home						Away					
Pld	W	D	L	GF	GA	GD	Pts	W	D	L	GF	GA	GD	W	D	L	GF	GA	GD
46	24	8	14	74	52	+22	80	13	4	6	45	25	+20	11	4	8	29	27	+2

Last updated: complete.
Source: Soccerway

==== Results by round ====
Round	1	2	3	4	5	6	7	8	9	10	11	13	12^{1}	14	15	16	17	18	19	20	21	22	23	24	27	28	29	30	25^{2}	31	32	33	34	35	36	37	38	39	26^{3}	40	41	42	43	44	45	46
Ground	A	H	A	H	H	A	H	A	H	A	H	A	A	H	A	H	H	A	H	A	H	A	A	H	A	H	H	A	H	H	A	A	H	H	A	H	A	H	A	A	A	H	A	H	A	H
Result	D	L	L	W	D	W	W	L	W	L	W	W	D	W	W	D	L	W	W	W	D	L	D	L	W	W	W	W	W	W	D	L	W	L	W	L	W	W	L	W	L	W	L	L	W	D
Position	12	17	18	15	16	13	10	12	7	12	10	9	8	5	3	4	5	4	2	2	4	6	6	7	7	7	5	5	2	2	4	5	4	5	4	4	4	4	4	3	4	3	4	5	5	5
Points	1	1	1	4	5	8	11	11	14	14	17	20	21	24	27	28	28	31	34	37	38	38	39	39	42	45	48	51	54	57	58	58	61	61	64	64	67	70	70	73	73	76	77	77	80	81

Source: EFL
A = Away; H = Home; W = Win; D = Draw; L = Loss; P = Postponed
Notes:
- ^{1} Matchday 12 (vs Swindon Town) was postponed due to the international call-ups.
- ^{2} Matchday 25 (vs Gillingham) was postponed due to a frozen pitch.
- ^{3} Matchday 26 (vs Oldham Athletic) was postponed due to adverse weather caused by Storm Goretti.

==== Matches ====
On 26 June, the League Two fixtures were released, with Notts County travelling to Newport County on the opening day.

Win Draw Loss Fixtures

2 August 2025 1	Newport County	1–1	Notts County	Newport
16:00 BST	Whitmore (yellow card) 23'; Garner 49'	Report	Jones 65' (pen.); Iorpenda (yellow card) 81'	Stadium: Rodney Parade; Attendance: 5,238; Referee: Jamie O'Connor
Note: Fixture was scheduled for a 15:00 kick-off, but was delayed an hour following a medical incident in the crowd.

9 August 2025 2	Notts County	1–2	Salford City	Nottingham
12:30 BST	Platt (yellow card) 40'; Bedeau (yellow card) 55'; Luker 71'; Jones (yellow card) 90+2'	Report	Oluwo 35'; Harris (yellow card) 43'; N'Mai 58', (yellow card) 59'; Austerfield (yellow card) 82'	Stadium: Meadow Lane; Attendance: 9,266 (192 away); Referee: Aaron Bannister
Note: Fixture was originally scheduled for a 15:00 kick-off, but was moved live Sky Sports broadcasting.

16 August 2025 3	Barrow	2–1	Notts County	Barrow-in-Furness
15:00 BST	Walker 32'; Canavan (yellow card) 82'; Shipley 90+7'	Report	Dennis 89'; Bedeau (yellow card) 90+2'	Stadium: Holker Street; Attendance: 3,285 (543 away); Referee: Paul Marsden

20 August 2025 4	Notts County	4–1	Shrewsbury Town	Nottingham
19:45 BST	Dennis 8'; Norburn (yellow card) 12'; Aljofree 20'; Tsaroulla 47'; Grant (yellow card) 78', (goal) 82'; Gordon (yellow card) 81'	Report	Marquis 32', (yellow card) 90'; Stubbs (yellow card) 41'; Nurse (yellow card) 90+3'	Stadium: Meadow Lane; Attendance: 8,810 (527 away); Referee: Darren Drysdale
Note: Fixture was originally scheduled for 19 August, but was moved due to a clash with cricket at Trent Bridge.

23 August 2025 5	Notts County	2–2	Bromley	Nottingham
15:00 BST	Dennis 11', 31'; Bedeau (yellow card) 85'	Report	Arthurs (yellow card) 9'; Thompson 18'; Sowunmi (yellow card) 30'; Odutayo (yellow card) 36', (goal) 83'; Pinnock (yellow card) 85'	Stadium: Meadow Lane; Attendance: 8,829 (177 away); Referee: Tom Reeves

30 August 2025 6	Tranmere Rovers	1–2	Notts County	Birkenhead
15:00 BST	Smallwood (yellow card) 20'; Patrick 45'; Bristow (yellow card) 45+2'; Harris (yellow card) 69'; O'Connor (yellow card) 73'; McGee (yellow card) 90+7'	Report	Jones (yellow card) 45+2'; Dennis 49'; Gordon 62'; Roos (yellow card) 87'	Stadium: Prenton Park; Attendance: 7,610; Referee: Zac Kennard-Kettle

6 September 2025 7	Notts County	1–0	Fleetwood Town	Nottingham
15:00 BST	Dennis 46', (yellow card) 73'; Gordon (yellow card) 52'; Palmer (yellow card) 53'	Report	Rooney (yellow card) 42'; Potter (yellow card) 79'; Graydon (yellow card) 90+1'	Stadium: Meadow Lane; Attendance: 9,068 (222 away); Referee: Stephen Parkinson

13 September 2025 8	Gillingham	1–0	Notts County	Gillingham
15:00 BST	Andrews (yellow card) 36', (goal) 46'; Smith (yellow card) 65'; Nevitt (yellow card) 75'; Dack (yellow card) 90+3'	Report	Dennis (yellow card) 15'	Stadium: Priestfield Stadium; Attendance: 6,743; Referee: Sam Mulhall

20 September 2025 9	Notts County	4–0	Crawley Town	Nottingham
15:00 BST	Robertson 45'; Hall 71', 90+2'; Jatta 75'	Report	McKirdy (yellow card) 36'; Barker (yellow card) 47'	Stadium: Meadow Lane; Attendance: 8,974 (259 away); Referee: James Durkin

27 September 2025 10	Crewe Alexandra	2–1	Notts County	Crewe
12:30 BST	Billington (yellow card) 1'; Demetriou 8'; Sanders (yellow card) 54'; Holíček (yellow card) 57'; March 90+5' (pen.)	Report	Hall (yellow card) 3'; Bedeau (yellow card) 36'; Tsaroulla 45+1'; Cotter (yellow card) 90+1'; Roos (yellow card) 90+4'	Stadium: Gresty Road; Attendance: 5,285; Referee: Paul Tierney
Note: Fixture was originally scheduled for a 15:00 kick-off, but was moved live Sky Sports broadcasting.

4 October 2025 11	Notts County	3–1	Oldham Athletic	Nottingham
15:00 BST	Daniels 7' (o.g.); Hall 29'; Jatta 49'; Roos (yellow card) 86'	Report	Mellon 54'; Conlon (yellow card) 68'	Stadium: Meadow Lane; Attendance: 11,418 (2,066 away); Referee: Oliver Mackey

18 October 2025 13	Barnet	0–1	Notts County	Edgware
15:00 BST	Crichlow (yellow card) 46'; Ndlovu (yellow card) 53'; Senior (yellow card) 64'	Report	McDonald (yellow card) 21'; Hall 90+4', (yellow card) 90+5'	Stadium: The Hive Stadium; Attendance: 3,875 (1,291 away); Referee: Martin Woods

21 October 2025 12	Swindon Town	2–2	Notts County	Swindon
19:45 BST	Drinan 19', 78'; Bodin (yellow card) 90+3'; Mabete (yellow card) 90+8'	Report	Grant 3'; McDonald (yellow card) 21'; Robertson (yellow card) 52'; Jatta 62', (yellow card) 63'; Norburn (yellow card) 76'	Stadium: County Ground; Attendance: 7,249 (490 away); Referee: David Rock
Note: Fixture was originally scheduled for 11 October, but was postponed due to international call-ups.

25 October 2025 14	Notts County	2–0	Cambridge United	Nottingham
15:00 BST	Jatta 72', 90'	Report	Lavery (yellow card) 30'; Kaikai (yellow card) 53'; Mpanzu (yellow card) 54'; Morrison (yellow card) 90+1'	Stadium: Meadow Lane; Attendance: 10,996 (1,353 away); Referee: Ross Joyce

10 November 2025 15	Cheltenham Town	1–2	Notts County	Cheltenham
20:00 GMT	Hutchinson 66'	Report	Jatta 23'; Hall 27'; Tsaroulla (yellow card) 45+1'; Iorpenda (yellow card) 67'; Bedeau (yellow card) 76'	Stadium: Whaddon Road; Attendance: 4,034; Referee: Benjamin Speedie
Note: Fixture was originally scheduled for 8 November, but was rescheduled for live Sky Sports broadcasting.

15 November 2025 16	Notts County	1–1	Harrogate Town	Nottingham
15:00 GMT	Dennis 90+3' (pen.)	Report	Cursons 39'; Sutton (yellow card) 59'; McCoulsky (yellow card) 77'	Stadium: Meadow Lane; Attendance: 10,124 (285 away); Referee: Scott Oldham

22 November 2025 17	Notts County	1–3	Colchester United	Nottingham
15:00 GMT	Vincent-Young 7' (o.g.); Robertson (yellow card) 45'	Report	Anderson 14'; Lisbie (yellow card) 28'; Mbick 56'; Read (yellow card) 59'; Vincent-Young (yellow card) 81'; Goodwin 90+5'	Stadium: Meadow Lane; Attendance: 9,447 (594 away); Referee: Simon Mather

29 November 2025 18	Bristol Rovers	0–1	Notts County	Horfield
15:00 GMT	Harrison (yellow card) 34'; Mola (yellow card) 90+4'	Report	Robertson (yellow card) 18'; Bennetts (yellow card) 32'; Hall (red card) 35'; Jatta (yellow card) 53'; Dennis 86'; Gordon (yellow card) 89'; Norburn (yellow card) 90+4'	Stadium: Memorial Stadium; Attendance: 7,807 (1,252 away); Referee: Edward Duckworth

9 December 2025 19	Notts County	3–2	Milton Keynes Dons	Nottingham
19:45 GMT	Dennis 8', (yellow card) 90+8'; Jatta 26'; Macari (yellow card) 45+4'; Iorpenda 88'	Report	Méndez-Laing 3', 13' (pen.); Nemane (yellow card) 36'; Offord (yellow card) 59'; Thompson-Sommers (yellow card) 90+5'	Stadium: Meadow Lane; Attendance: 8,872 (462 away); Referee: Aaron Farmer

13 December 2025 20	Grimsby Town	0–2	Notts County	Cleethorpes
15:00 GMT	McJannett (yellow card) 41'	Report	Platt (yellow card) 26'; Dennis 58'; Roos (yellow card) 79'; Jatta 90+3', (yellow card) 90+4'	Stadium: Blundell Park; Attendance: 7,082 (1,152 away); Referee: Wayne Cartmel

20 December 2025 21	Notts County	0–0	Walsall	Nottingham
12:30 GMT	Grant (yellow card) 70'	Report	Finnigan (yellow card) 16'; Barrett (yellow card) 76'	Stadium: Meadow Lane; Attendance: 11,870 (1,496 away); Referee: Steven Copeland
Note: Fixture was originally scheduled for a 15:00 kick-off, but was rescheduled for live Sky Sports broadcasting.

26 December 2025 22	Chesterfield	2–0	Notts County	Chesterfield
15:00 GMT	McFadzean (yellow card) 15'; Naylor (yellow card) 19'; Grimes (yellow card) 36'; Bonis 65'; Roos 76' (o.g.)	Report	Dennis (yellow card) 48'; Tsaroulla (yellow card) 68'; Macari (yellow card) 87'	Stadium: SMH Group Stadium; Attendance: 10,059 (1,024 away); Referee: Benjamin Speedie

29 December 2025 23	Milton Keynes Dons	1–1	Notts County	Denbigh
19:45 GMT	Thompson-Sommers (yellow card) 8'; Gilbey (yellow card) 54'; Paterson 70'	Report	Iorpenda 44'; Dennis (yellow card) 67'; Hall (yellow card) 81'; Roos (yellow card) 90'	Stadium: Stadium MK; Attendance: 9,233 (1,936 away); Referee: Lee Swabey

1 January 2026 24	Notts County	0–1	Accrington Stanley	Nottingham
15:00 GMT	Platt (yellow card) 16'; Jatta (yellow card) 45+3'; Bedeau (yellow card) 90'; Iorpenda (yellow card) 90+4'; Dennis (yellow card) 90+6'	Report	Henderson (yellow card) 11'; Woods (yellow card) 35'; Whalley (yellow card) 45+3', (goal) 72'; Love (yellow card) 70'	Stadium: Meadow Lane; Attendance: 10,239 (218 away); Referee: Zac Kennard-Kettle

17 January 2026 27	Crawley Town	1–2	Notts County	Crawley
15:00 GMT	Williams (yellow card) 47'; Lolos (red card) 64'; McKirdy 90+4'	Report	Jones 54', (yellow card) 68'; Jatta 81'; Ness (yellow card) 90+3'	Stadium: Broadfield Stadium; Referee: Matthew Russell

24 January 2026 28	Notts County	1–0	Crewe Alexandra	Nottingham
12:30 GMT	Jatta 8'; Norburn (yellow card) 30'; Bedeau (yellow card) 82'	Report	Holíček (yellow card) 52'; O'Reilly (yellow card) 62'	Stadium: Meadow Lane; Attendance: 9,720 (846 away); Referee: Isaac Searle

27 January 2026 29	Notts County	2–1	Swindon Town	Nottingham
19:45 GMT	Jatta 44'; Dennis 66'	Report	Clarke 39'	Stadium: Meadow Lane; Attendance: 8,931 (492 away); Referee: David Webb

31 January 2026 30	Fleetwood Town	1–2	Notts County	Fleetwood
15:00 GMT	Holgate (yellow card) 59'; Davies 65', (yellow card) 70'	Report	Jatta 38', (yellow card) 52'; Belshaw (yellow card) 56'; Dennis (yellow card) 64', (goal) 70'; Norburn (yellow card) 81'	Stadium: Highbury Stadium; Attendance: 3,428 (872 away); Referee: Ross Joyce

3 February 2026 25	Notts County	1–0	Gillingham	Nottingham
19:45 GMT	Robertson 27'; Ness (yellow card) 76'	Report	Andrews (yellow card) 56'; Dack (yellow card) 81'; Beckles (yellow card) 86'	Stadium: Meadow Lane; Attendance: 8,731 (404 away); Referee: Abigail Byrne
Note: Fixture was originally scheduled for 4 January, but it was postponed due to a frozen pitch.

7 February 2026 31	Notts County	2–1	Barrow	Nottingham
15:00 GMT	Smith 16' (o.g.); Iorpenda (yellow card) 43'; Dennis 58'	Report	Smith (yellow card) 19'; McCann 30'; Rose (yellow card) 38'; Anderson (yellow card) 86'	Stadium: Meadow Lane; Attendance: 9,581 (211 away); Referee: Michael Barlow

14 February 2026 32	Bromley	1–1	Notts County	Bromley
15:00 GMT	Dennis 28' (o.g.)	Report	Jones 52' (pen.); Robertson (yellow card) 60' (yellow-red card) 83'; Bedeau (yellow card) 61'	Stadium: Hayes Lane; Referee: Darren Drysdale

17 February 2026 33	Shrewsbury Town	1–0	Notts County	Shrewsbury
19:45 GMT	Perry 54'	Report	Enoru (yellow card) 63'; Macari (yellow card) 90+5'; Bedeau (yellow card) 90+5'	Stadium: New Meadow; Attendance: 6,554; Referee: William Davis

21 February 2026 34	Notts County	5–0	Tranmere Rovers	Nottingham
15:00 GMT	Lowe 15' (o.g.); Platt (yellow card) 45'; Ndlovu 46', 55'; Jones 57'; Dennis 86' (pen.)	Report	Obiero (yellow card) 34'; Warrington (yellow card) 41'	Stadium: Meadow Lane; Attendance: 10,329 (754 away); Referee: Harry Wager

28 February 2026 35	Notts County	0–1	Grimsby Town	Nottingham
15:00 GMT	Iorpenda (yellow card) 36'; Ndlovu (red card) 76'; Dennis (yellow card) 90+1'; Robertson (yellow card) 90+2'	Report	Soonsup-Bell (yellow card) 15'; Turi (yellow card) 45'; Rodgers (yellow card) 50'; Vernam 85'	Stadium: Meadow Lane; Attendance: 12,387 (1,993 away); Referee: Declan Brown

7 March 2026 36	Walsall	1–2	Notts County	Walsall
15:00 GMT	Jellis (yellow card) 22'; Comley (yellow card) 36'; Pressley 45+1'; Burke (yellow card) 90+6'	Report	Jones (yellow card) 49', (goal) 90+4'; Dennis (yellow card) 51'; Grant (yellow card) 55'; Norburn 79'; Bennetts (yellow card) 90'	Stadium: Bescot Stadium; Attendance: 7,316; Referee: Scott Jackson

14 March 2026 37	Notts County	2–3	Chesterfield	Nottingham
12:30 GMT	Norburn (yellow card) 9' (yellow-red card) 19'; Swinkels 36' (o.g.); Tsaroulla (yellow card) 42'; Platt 45+1'; Bedeau (yellow card) 90+1'; Dennis (yellow card) 90+6'	Report	Dobra 16'; Curtis (yellow card) 23'; Swinkels (yellow card) 31'; Naylor 44', (yellow card) 45'; Mandeville 66'; Braybrooke (yellow card) 70'	Stadium: Meadow Lane; Attendance: 12,604; Referee: Matt Corlett
Note: Fixture was initially scheduled for a 15:00 kick-off, but was brought forward for Sky Sports broadcasting.

17 March 2026 38	Accrington Stanley	0–4	Notts County	Accrington
19:45 GMT	Martin (yellow card) 88'	Report	Jones 9'; Tsaroulla (yellow card) 23'; Bennetts 31'; Grant 68'; Hall 83'	Stadium: Crown Ground; Attendance: 1,863 (538 away); Referee: Oliver Yates

21 March 2026 39	Notts County	5–2	Cheltenham Town	Nottingham
15:00 GMT				Stadium: Meadow Lane; Attendance: 10,467

24 March 2026 26	Oldham Athletic	3–0	Notts County	Oldham
19:45 GMT	Drummond 5'; Fondop 56', 69'	Report	Norburn (yellow card) 24' (yellow-red card) 48'; Tsaroulla (yellow card) 28'; Jones (yellow card) 34'	Stadium: Boundary Park; Attendance: 7,701 (1,101 away); Referee: Andrew Humphries
Note: Fixture was originally scheduled for 10 January, but it was postponed due to adverse weather caused by Storm Goretti.

28 March 2026 40	Harrogate Town	0–2	Notts County	Harrogate
12:30 GMT	Brenan (yellow card) 62'	Report	Jatta 10', 79'	Stadium: Wetherby Road; Attendance: 3,816; Referee: Will Finnie
Note: Fixture was initially scheduled for a 15:00 kick-off, but was brought forward for Sky Sports broadcasting.

3 April 2026 41	Salford City	2–1	Notts County	Kersal
15:00 BST	Graydon (yellow card) 62', (goal) 90+2'; Butcher 90+6'	Report	Hall (yellow card) 90+2'; Browne 90+5'	Stadium: Moor Lane; Attendance: 4,011 (1,362 away); Referee: Seb Stockbridge

6 April 2026 42	Notts County	3–1	Newport County	Nottingham
15:00 BST	Ness 19', 23'; Grant (yellow card) 64'; Luker 86'; Iorpenda (yellow card) 90+5'	Report	Biggins (yellow card) 60'; Lloyd 65'; Sprangler (yellow card) 76'; Crole (yellow card) 90+6'	Stadium: Meadow Lane; Attendance: 11,431 (305 away); Referee: Edward Duckworth

11 April 2026 43	Cambridge United	4–0	Notts County	Cambridge
15:00 BST	Ball 2'; Lavery 28'; Gibbons 33', 55'; Eastwood (red card) 40'	Report	Bedeau (yellow card) 37'; Enoru (yellow card) 77'	Stadium: Abbey Stadium; Attendance: 7,983; Referee: Benjamin Speedie

18 April 2026 44	Notts County	1–2	Barnet	Nottingham
15:00 BST	Jones 36' (pen.); Hall (yellow card) 90'	Report	Tshimanga 32', 69'; Senior (yellow card) 89'	Stadium: Meadow Lane; Attendance: 11,437 (510 away); Referee: Tom Reeves

25 April 2026 45	Colchester United	0–1	Notts County	Colchester
15:00 BST	Vincent-Young (yellow card) 45+1'; Barbrook (yellow card) 52'; Read (yellow card) 70'	Report	Tsaroulla 47', (yellow card) 76'; Grant (yellow card) 61'; Robertson (yellow card) 75'	Stadium: Colchester Community Stadium; Attendance: 6,392 (1,248 away); Referee: Charles Breakspear

2 May 2026 46	Notts County	1–1	Bristol Rovers	Nottingham
15:00 BST	Tsaroulla (yellow card) 10', (goal) 27'; Jatta (yellow card) 71'; Palmer (yellow card) 75'	Report	Forde (yellow card) 20'; Harrison 55'; Mola (yellow card) 65'; Akhamrich (yellow card) 77'	Stadium: Meadow Lane; Attendance: 16,264 (1,790 away); Referee: Ross Joyce

==== Play-offs ====
Notts County finished 5th in the regular season, and were drawn against Chesterfield whom finished in 6th.

10 May 2026 Semi-final first leg	Chesterfield	0–1	Notts County	Chesterfield
18:00 BST	Bonis (penalty missed) 6'; Curtis (yellow card) 36'	Report	Luker 28', (yellow card) 52'; Jones (yellow card) 42'; Tsaroulla (yellow card) 64'; Ness (yellow card) 88'	Stadium: SMH Group Stadium; Referee: Will Finnie

15 May 2026 Semi-final second leg	Notts County	0–0 (1–0 agg.)	Chesterfield	Nottingham
20:00 BST	Grant (yellow card) 90+8'	Report	McFadzean (yellow card) 59'	Stadium: Meadow Lane; Attendance: 17,224; Referee: Thomas Parsons

25 May 2026 Final	Notts County	3–0	Salford City	Wembley, London
15:00 BST	Tsaroulla (yellow card) 22'; Jatta 32'; Ness 45', (yellow card) 57'; Jones 70'		Mnoga (yellow card) 44'; Woodburn (yellow card) 90+3'	Stadium: Wembley Stadium; Attendance: 30,851; Referee: Tom Reeves

=== FA Cup ===
Notts County were drawn away to Brackley Town in the first round.

Win Draw Loss Fixtures

1 November 2025 First round	Brackley Town	2–2 (4–3 p)	Notts County	Brackley
17:30 GMT	Lowe 27'; Maxted (yellow card) 50'; Stewart 90+6' (pen.), (yellow card) 115'	Report	Jatta 13'; Jones 51' (pen.); Norburn (yellow card) 105'; Ness (yellow card) 107'	Stadium: St James Park; Attendance: 2,223 (946 away); Referee: Ben Atkinson
	Penalties
	Stewart (penalty scored); Lyttle (penalty scored); Waldron (penalty missed); Pollock (penalty scored); Brown (penalty scored)		Jatta (penalty missed); Dennis (penalty scored); Bennetts (penalty missed); Jarvis (penalty scored); Kouhyar (penalty scored)

=== EFL Cup ===
Notts County were drawn away to Wigan Athletic in the first round.

Win Draw Loss Fixtures

12 August 2025 First round	Wigan Athletic	1–0	Notts County	Wigan
19:45 BST	Mullin 10' (pen.); Brenan (yellow card) 23'; Tickle (yellow card) 54'; Murray (yellow card) 68'; Weir (yellow card) 83'	Report	Cotter (yellow card) 32'	Stadium: Brick Community Stadium; Attendance: 2,907 (456 away); Referee: Oliver Yates

=== EFL Trophy ===
Notts County were drawn against Barnsley, Lincoln City and Manchester United U21 in the group stage.

Pos	Div	Team	Pld	W	PW	PL	L	GF	GA	GD	Pts	Qualification
1	L1	Lincoln City	3	3	0	0	0	8	0	+8	9	Advance to Round 2
2	L1	Barnsley	3	1	0	0	2	6	6	0	3	Advance to Round 2
3	ACA	Manchester United U21	3	1	0	0	2	4	8	−4	3	
4	L2	Notts County	3	1	0	0	2	2	6	−4	3	

Source: EFL

Win Draw Loss Fixtures

2 September 2025 North Group D	Lincoln City	3–0	Notts County	Lincoln
19:00 BST	Bradley 8'; House (yellow card) 43', (goal) 58'; Collins 76'; Thorn (yellow card) 85'; McGrandles (yellow card) 87'	Report		Stadium: Sincil Bank; Attendance: 2,526 (625 away); Referee: Greg Rollason

30 September 2025 North Group D	Notts County	2–1	Barnsley	Nottingham
19:00 BST	Luker 9'; Norburn (yellow card) 45+1'; Robertson (yellow card) 56'; Tsaroulla (yellow card) 81'; Hall 89', (yellow card) 90+3'	Report	Bland (yellow card) 7' (yellow-red card) 53'; Keillor-Dunn 50'; Watson (yellow card) 84'	Stadium: Meadow Lane; Attendance: 1,822 (440 away); Referee: Peter Wright

4 November 2025 North Group D	Notts County	0–2	Manchester United U21	Nottingham
19:00 GMT	Gill (yellow card) 22'; Platt (yellow card) 58'; Ness (yellow card) 85'	Report	León (yellow card) 24'; Lacey 29'; Helafu (yellow card) 37'; Devaney 54'	Stadium: Meadow Lane; Attendance: 2,735 (442 away); Referee: Jamie O'Connor

== Statistics ==
=== Appearances and goals ===
As of match played 25 May 2026

Players with no appearances are not included on the list; italics indicate a loaned in player

No.	Pos	Nat	Player	Total		League Two		FA Cup		EFL Cup		EFL Trophy		League Two play-offs	
No.	Pos	Nat	Player	Apps	Goals	Apps	Goals	Apps	Goals	Apps	Goals	Apps	Goals	Apps	Goals
1	GK	(Netherlands) NED	Kelle Roos	26	0	24+0	0	1+0	0	1+0	0	0+0	0	0+0	0
3	DF	(England) ENG	Rod McDonald	26	0	18+4	0	0+0	0	1+0	0	0+0	0	3+0	0
4	DF	(Grenada) GRN	Jacob Bedeau	52	0	46+0	0	1+0	0	1+0	0	1+0	0	3+0	0
5	DF	(England) ENG	Matthew Platt	23	1	21+1	1	0+0	0	0+0	0	1+0	0	0+0	0
6	MF	(England) ENG	Jack Hinchy	3	0	0+2	0	0+0	0	0+0	0	1+0	0	0+0	0
7	FW	(Guinea) GUI	Maï Traoré	4	0	0+1	0	0+1	0	0+0	0	2+0	0	0+0	0
8	MF	(Grenada) GRN	Oliver Norburn	40	1	29+6	1	1+0	0	0+0	0	1+0	0	3+0	0
10	FW	(Malta) MLT	Jodi Jones	42	10	30+7	8	1+0	1	1+0	0	0+0	0	3+0	1
11	MF	(Republic of Ireland) IRL	Conor Grant	47	3	28+13	3	1+0	0	1+0	0	1+0	0	0+3	0
12	DF	(England) ENG	Lucas Ness	34	3	10+17	2	1+0	0	0+0	0	3+0	0	3+0	1
14	MF	(England) ENG	Tom Iorpenda	53	3	43+3	3	0+1	0	1+0	0	2+0	0	3+0	0
16	MF	(England) ENG	Jayden Luker	17	4	3+9	2	0+0	0	1+0	0	1+0	1	3+0	1
17	FW	(Afghanistan) AFG	Maziar Kouhyar	41	0	8+26	0	0+1	0	0+1	0	2+0	0	0+3	0
18	MF	(England) ENG	Matt Palmer	31	1	26+2	1	0+0	0	1+0	0	0+0	0	0+2	0
19	FW	(England) ENG	Matthew Dennis	45	14	23+19	14	0+1	0	0+1	0	1+0	0	0+0	0
20	MF	(Scotland) SCO	Scott Robertson	27	2	15+6	2	1+0	0	0+0	0	1+1	0	3+0	0
21	GK	(England) ENG	Harry Griffiths	3	0	0+0	0	0+0	0	0+0	0	3+0	0	0+0	0
22	FW	(Cameroon) CMR	Beck-Ray Enoru	5	0	0+5	0	0+0	0	0+0	0	0+0	0	0+0	0
23	DF	(Republic of Ireland) IRL	Luke Browne	6	1	0+6	1	0+0	0	0+0	0	0+0	0	0+0	0
25	DF	(Cyprus) CYP	Nick Tsaroulla	44	4	38+1	4	1+0	0	0+0	0	0+1	0	3+0	0
26	MF	(Jamaica) JAM	Tyrese Hall	39	8	16+18	7	1+0	0	0+1	0	3+0	1	0+0	0
27	MF	(Norway) NOR	Harald Tangen	11	0	5+6	0	0+0	0	0+0	0	0+0	0	0+0	0
28	DF	(Scotland) SCO	Lewis Macari	40	0	35+1	0	1+0	0	0+0	0	2+1	0	0+0	0
29	FW	(The Gambia) GAM	Alassana Jatta	36	16	28+3	14	1+0	1	0+0	0	1+0	0	3+0	1
31	GK	(England) ENG	James Belshaw	25	0	22+0	0	0+0	0	0+0	0	0+0	0	3+0	0
37	DF	(Republic of Ireland) IRL	Barry Cotter	10	0	5+4	0	0+0	0	1+0	0	0+0	0	0+0	0
39	FW	(Zimbabwe) ZIM	Lee Ndlovu	18	2	5+10	2	0+0	0	0+0	0	0+0	0	0+3	0
47	MF	(Germany) GER	Keanan Bennetts	38	1	16+16	1	0+1	0	1+0	0	3+0	0	0+1	0
51	MF	(England) ENG	Kameron Muir	2	0	0+0	0	0+0	0	0+0	0	0+2	0	0+0	0
52	DF	(Wales) WAL	Theo Robinson	1	0	0+0	0	0+0	0	0+0	0	0+1	0	0+0	0
53	FW	(England) ENG	Harrison Iwunze	3	0	0+0	0	0+0	0	0+0	0	0+3	0	0+0	0
54	FW	(England) ENG	Charlie Gill	1	0	0+0	0	0+0	0	0+0	0	1+0	0	0+0	0
55	FW	(England) ENG	Daniel Emmanuel	1	0	0+0	0	0+0	0	0+0	0	0+1	0	0+0	0
57	MF	(England) ENG	Daniel Adiefeh	1	0	0+0	0	0+0	0	0+0	0	0+1	0	0+0	0
Player(s) who featured but departed the club during the season:
2	DF	(England) ENG	Kellan Gordon	15	1	4+10	1	0+0	0	0+1	0	0+0	0	0+0	0
22	MF	(England) ENG	Curtis Edwards	1	0	0+1	0	0+0	0	0+0	0	0+0	0	0+0	0
23	DF	(England) ENG	Sonny Aljofree	11	1	8+1	1	0+0	0	1+0	0	1+0	0	0+0	0
36	FW	(England) ENG	Will Jarvis	6	0	0+2	0	0+1	0	0+0	0	2+1	0	0+0	0
