= Oliver Norburn =

Grenadian-English footballer (born 1992)

Personal information
- Full name: Oliver Lewis Norburn
- Date of birth: 26 October 1992 (age 34)
- Place of birth: Bolton, England
- Height: 6 ft 1 in (1.85 m)
- Position: Midfielder

Team information
- Current team: Oldham Athletic
- Number: 8

Youth career
- Chelsea
- 2009–2011: Leicester City

Senior career*
Years	Team	Apps	(Gls)
2011–2012	Leicester City	0	(0)
2011	→ Bristol Rovers (loan)	5	(0)
2012–2014	Bristol Rovers	51	(3)
2014–2015	Plymouth Argyle	14	(0)
2015–2016	Guiseley	20	(3)
2016–2017	Macclesfield Town	24	(5)
2017–2018	Tranmere Rovers	42	(4)
2018–2021	Shrewsbury Town	92	(16)
2021–2023	Peterborough United	44	(0)
2023–2025	Blackpool	42	(1)
2025	→ Wigan Athletic (loan)	14	(1)
2025–2026	Notts County	38	(1)
2026–	Oldham Athletic		

International career
2021–2022	Grenada	4	(0)
- * Club domestic league appearances and goals as of 25 May 2026

Oliver Lewis Norburn (born 26 October 1992) is a professional footballer who plays as a midfielder for EFL League Two club Oldham Athletic

Born in England, Norburn plays for the Grenada national team. He made his debut for the team in 2021 and played at the 2021 CONCACAF Gold Cup.

In his career, Norburn played in the English Football League for Bristol Rovers, Plymouth Argyle, Shrewsbury Town, Peterborough United, Blackpool and his current team Notts County. In the National League he has played for Guiseley, Macclesfield Town and Tranmere Rovers.

== Club career ==
Norburn played as a youth team player with Chelsea before moving to Leicester City, where he graduated through to the professional ranks in 2011. He joined Bristol Rovers on a month-long loan deal in late September 2011, later extended to three months, where he played alongside fellow on-loan Leicester teammate Cian Bolger.

He made his debut in senior football on 14 October 2011, when he was an 86th-minute substitute for Bristol Rovers in a 5–2 victory over Rotherham United. By the end of December, Norburn returned to Leicester City after his loan-spell at Bristol Rovers finished and spent the rest of the season staying at Leicester City. On 3 July Norburn signed with the Bristol Rovers on a permanent basis, and agreed to sign a one-year deal with the option for a further 12 months with the club. On the opening game of the season, Norburn made his debut in a 2–0 loss against Oxford United. Two months later, he scored his first goal in a 3–1 win over Northampton Town. His second goal came on 5 February 2013, in a 1–1 draw against Cheltenham Town and his third was followed up a month later, in a 2–1 win over Exeter City. At the end of the 2012–13 season, Norburn was offered a new contract by the club, where he signed a one-year contract extension on 24 June 2013.

In the 2013–14 season, Norburn had his first team opportunities limited, making sixteen appearances. On 4 April 2014, he left Bristol Rovers by mutual consent. First team manager Darrell Clarke said of Norburn leaving: "Ollie has left the club, and that was mutually agreed. For whatever reason it has not gone well for Ollie this season. Ollie has a chance now to try and earn himself a contract at another club, and we wish him well and thank him for his efforts."

On 23 July 2014, Norburn signed for Plymouth Argyle as a free agent on a one-year deal. He was released by Plymouth at the end of the 2014–15 season having failed to establish himself in the first team. He started training with Guiseley in late 2015, and then signed for the club after impressing manager Mark Bower in the sessions. On 27 February 2016 Norburn scored a controversial goal for Guiseley in a National League match against Braintree Town, after Braintree Town had put the ball out for a player to receive treatment. The goal stood and Guiseley drew the game 1–1.

Norburn joined Macclesfield Town of the same league in July 2016. He scored eight goals in his sole season with the Silkmen, including one in each leg of their FA Trophy semi-final win over Tranmere Rovers and one more in the 3–2 loss to York City in the final, before signing a three-year contract with Tranmere.

On 9 August 2018, after winning promotion to League Two with Tranmere via the play-offs, he signed a three-year deal to move to Shrewsbury Town, led by his former Macclesfield manager John Askey. He signed a new contract with Shrewsbury in July 2019.

On 10 August 2021, Norburn joined newly promoted EFL Championship club Peterborough United on a three-year deal for an undisclosed fee.

On 14 December 2021, Norburn was made captain of Peterborough United replacing Mark Beevers.

On 29 June 2023, Norburn joined EFL League One club Blackpool.

In January 2025, Norburn joined fellow League One side Wigan Athletic on loan for the remainder of the season.

On 16 June 2025, Norburn agreed to join League Two side Notts County on a one-year deal with the option for a further season upon his release from Blackpool. On 25 May 2026, he started the 2026 EFL League Two play-off final as County defeated Salford City to earn promotion to League One. Following promotion, the club announced that he would be departing the club to accept an offer closer to his home.

On 3 June 2026, Norburn joined League 2 side Oldham Athletic on a one-year deal with the option for a further season.

== International career ==
On 9 November 2019, Norburn was called up to the Grenada national team, for which he qualifies through his paternal grandfather, for upcoming fixtures in the CONCACAF Nations League. He debuted with Grenada in a 4–0 2021 CONCACAF Gold Cup loss to Honduras on 14 July 2021.

== Personal life ==
Norburn and his fiancée have a daughter. A son died in infancy in September 2020.

== Career statistics ==
As of end of 2025–26 season

Appearances and goals by club, season and competition
Club	Season	League			FA Cup		League Cup		Other		Total	
Club	Season	Division	Apps	Goals	Apps	Goals	Apps	Goals	Apps	Goals	Apps	Goals
Leicester City	2011–12	Championship	0	0	—		0	0	—		0	0
Bristol Rovers (loan)	2011–12	League Two	5	0	1	0	—		—		6	0
Bristol Rovers	2012–13	League Two	35	3	1	0	1	0	0	0	37	3
Bristol Rovers	2013–14	League Two	16	0	4	1	1	0	1 (Note: Appearance(s) in Football League Trophy)	0	22	1
Bristol Rovers	Total		51	3	5	1	2	0	1	0	59	4
Plymouth Argyle	2014–15	League Two	14	0	2	0	1	0	2	0	19	0
Guiseley	2015–16	National League	20	3	—		—		3 (Note: Appearances in FA Trophy)	0	23	3
Macclesfield Town	2016–17	National League	24	5	0	0	—		5	3	29	8
Tranmere Rovers	2017–18	National League	42	4	3	0	—		3 (Note: One appearance in FA Trophy, two in National League play-offs)	0	48	4
Shrewsbury Town	2018–19	League One	41	9	5	2	1	0	2 (Note: Appearances in EFL Trophy)	0	49	11
Shrewsbury Town	2019–20	League One	17	3	6	0	0	0	1	0	24	3
Shrewsbury Town	2020–21	League One	34	4	3	0	0	0	1	0	38	4
Shrewsbury Town	Total		92	16	14	2	1	0	4	0	111	18
Peterborough United	2021–22	Championship	36	0	2	0	0	0	—		38	0
Peterborough United	2022–23	League One	16	0	0	0	0	0	2 (Note: Appearance(s) in EFL League One play-offs)	0	18	0
Peterborough United	Total		52	0	2	0	0	0	2	0	56	0
Blackpool	2023–24	League One	34	1	3	0	0	0	2	0	39	1
Blackpool	2024–25	League One	8	0	1	0	2	0	2	0	13	0
Blackpool	Total		42	1	4	0	2	0	4	0	52	1
Wigan Athletic (loan)	2024–25	League One	14	0	0	0	0	0	0	0	14	0
Notts County	2025–26	League Two	35	1	1	0	0	0	4 (Note: One appearance in EFL Trophy, three appearances in EFL League Two play-offs)	0	40	1
Career total			391	33	31	3	6	0	28	3	457	39

== Honours ==
Macclesfield Town

- FA Trophy runner-up: 2016–17

Notts County

- EFL League Two play-offs: 2026
