= Tyrese Hall =

Jamaican footballer (born 2005)

Personal information
- Full name: Tyrese Shaun Hall
- Date of birth: 4 September 2005 (age 21)
- Place of birth: Camden, England
- Height: 1.83 m (6 ft 0 in)
- Position: Attacking midfielder

Team information
- Current team: Tottenham Hotspur
- Number: 49

Youth career
- Chelsea
- Tottenham Hotspur

Senior career*
Years	Team	Apps	(Gls)
2025–	Tottenham Hotspur	0	(0)
2025–2026	→ Notts County (loan)	31	(7)

International career^{‡}
2024	England U19	2	(0)
2026–	Jamaica	1	(0)
- * Club domestic league appearances and goals as of 3 April 2026 (UTC) ‡ National team caps and goals as of 00:46, 1 April 2026 (UTC)

Tyrese Shaun Hall (born 4 September 2005) is a professional footballer who plays as an attacking midfielder for Premier League club Tottenham Hotspur. Born in England, he plays for the Jamaica national team.

== Club career ==
He is a product of the youth system at Tottenham Hotspur having joined the club from the academy of Chelsea at under–8 level. Considered a central midfielder, he also played in a deeper role in his time in the Spurs academy. He started playing for the Spurs Under–18 team during the 2021–22 season. He progressed from the Spurs Under–18 side into the Under–21s during the 2023–24 season and, still aged 18 years-old, trained on occasion with the Spurs first team.

He signed a five-year contract with the club in the summer of 2024. That summer, he featured in pre-season matches with the Tottenham first-team on their summer tour. He played for the club's Under–21 side in the EFL Trophy during the 2024–25 season, where his performances included a successful penalty kick in a shoot-out against EFL League One club Bristol Rovers.

On 4 August 2025, Hall joined League Two club Notts County on a season-long loan deal.

== International career ==
Born in England, Hall is of Jamaican descent. He is an England U19 international. On 19 May 2025, he made the preliminary 60-man squad for the Jamaica national team for the 2025 CONCACAF Gold Cup.

On 31 March 2026, Hall came off the bench to make his senior debut for Jamaica in a 0–1 defeat to DR Congo in a FIFA World Cup play off match.

== Personal life ==
He attended The Compton School in North Finchley.

== Career statistics ==
=== Club ===
As of match played 3 April 2026

Appearances and goals by club, season and competition
Club	Season	League			National cup		League Cup		Europe		Other		Total	
Club	Season	Division	Apps	Goals	Apps	Goals	Apps	Goals	Apps	Goals	Apps	Goals	Apps	Goals
Tottenham Hotspur	2025–26	Premier League	0	0	0	0	0	0	—		—		0	0
Notts County (loan)	2025–26	League Two	31	7	1	0	1	0	—		3 (Note: Appearances in EFL Trophy)	1	36	8
Career total			31	7	1	0	1	0	0	0	3	1	36	8

=== International ===
As of match played 31 March 2026

Appearances and goals by national team and year
National team	Year	Apps	Goals
Jamaica	2026	1	0
Total		1	0
