= Conor Grant (footballer, born 2001) =

Irish footballer (born 2001)

Personal information
- Full name: Conor Michael Grant
- Date of birth: 23 July 2001 (age 25)
- Place of birth: Dublin, Ireland
- Height: 1.78 m (5 ft 10 in)
- Position: Midfielder

Team information
- Current team: Notts County
- Number: 11

Youth career
- –2017: Malahide United
- 2017: Shamrock Rovers
- 2017–2018: Sheffield Wednesday

Senior career*
Years	Team	Apps	(Gls)
2018–2021	Sheffield Wednesday	0	(0)
2021–2022	Rochdale	53	(5)
2022–2024	Milton Keynes Dons	40	(1)
2024	→ Barnsley (loan)	12	(1)
2024–	Notts County	74	(8)

International career
2018	Republic of Ireland U18	3	(0)
2019	Republic of Ireland U19	6	(0)
2021	Republic of Ireland U21	3	(0)
- * Club domestic league appearances and goals as of 01:46, 22 August 2026 (UTC)

Conor Michael Grant (born 23 July 2001) is an Irish professional footballer who plays as a midfielder for EFL League One club Notts County.

== Club career ==
=== Sheffield Wednesday ===
At youth level, Grant played for Irish clubs Malahide United and Shamrock Rovers before joining the academy of EFL Championship club Sheffield Wednesday in May 2017. He signed professional terms in December 2018. On 15 September 2020, Grant made his professional debut coming on as an 89th-minute substitute in a 2–0 EFL Cup second round win over Rochdale.

=== Rochdale ===
On 1 February 2021, Grant signed a two-and-a-half-year contract with EFL League One club Rochdale for an undisclosed fee. He made his debut five days later as a 68th-minute substitute in a 2–0 defeat away to Charlton Athletic on 6 February 2021. On 13 April 2021, Grant scored his first senior professional goal in a 2–1 home win over Swindon Town.

=== Milton Keynes Dons ===
On 24 June 2022, Grant joined EFL League One club Milton Keynes Dons for an undisclosed fee, signing a "long term" contract. He made his debut on the opening day of the season in a 1–0 defeat away to Cambridge United. Grant scored his first goal for the club on 9 August 2022 in a 1–0 EFL Cup first round home win over Sutton United. On 3 May 2022 he was named Young Player of the Year at the club's end of season awards ceremony.

==== Barnsley (loan) ====
On 2 February 2024, Grant joined League One club Barnsley on loan for the remainder of the season with an option to buy.

=== Notts County ===
On 9 August 2024, Grant joined League Two club Notts County on a three-year deal, which saw Aaron Nemane go the other way and Notts County receive an undisclosed fee.

== Career statistics ==
As of end of 2025–26 season

Appearances and goals by club, season and competition
Club	Season	League			National Cup		League Cup		Other		Total	
Club	Season	Division	Apps	Goals	Apps	Goals	Apps	Goals	Apps	Goals	Apps	Goals
Sheffield Wednesday	2020–21	Championship	0	0	0	0	1	0	—		1	0
Sheffield Wednesday	Total		0	0	0	0	1	0	0	0	1	0
Rochdale	2020–21	League One	20	1	0	0	—		—		20	1
Rochdale	2021–22	League Two	33	4	2	0	0	0	3 (Note: Appearance(s) in EFL Trophy)	0	38	4
Rochdale	Total		53	5	2	0	0	0	3	0	58	5
Milton Keynes Dons	2022–23	League One	29	1	2	2	3	1	4	0	38	4
Milton Keynes Dons	2023–24	League Two	11	0	1	0	0	0	2	0	14	0
Milton Keynes Dons	Total		40	1	3	2	3	1	6	0	52	4
Barnsley (loan)	2023–24	League One	12	1	—		—		2 (Note: Appearance(s) in League One Play-offs)	0	14	1
Notts County	2024–25	League Two	32	4	0	0	1	1	3 (Note: One appearance in EFL Trophy & two appearances in League Two Play-offs)	0	36	5
Notts County	2025–26	League Two	41	3	1	1	0	0	5 (Note: Two appearances in EFL Trophy & three appearances in League Two Play-offs)	0	47	4
Notts County	Total		73	7	1	1	1	1	8	0	83	9
Career total			178	14	6	3	5	2	17	0	208	19

== Honours ==
Notts County

- EFL League Two play-offs: 2026

Individual

- Milton Keynes Dons Young Player of the Year: 2022–23
