= Tom Iorpenda =

English footballer (born 2005)

Personal information
- Full name: Thomas Achi Iorpenda
- Date of birth: 6 April 2005 (age 21)
- Place of birth: Islington, England
- Height: 6 ft 3 in (1.91 m)
- Position: Midfielder

Team information
- Current team: Swansea City
- Number: 16

Youth career
- –2021: Brighton & Hove Albion
- 2021–2026: Huddersfield Town

Senior career*
Years	Team	Apps	(Gls)
2023–2026	Huddersfield Town	7	(0)
2023	→ Hyde United (loan)	7	(0)
2025–2026	→ Notts County (loan)	46	(3)
2026–	Swansea City	0	(0)
- * Club domestic league appearances and goals as of 31 August 2026 (UTC)

Thomas Achi Iorpenda (born 6 April 2005) is an English footballer who plays as a midfielder for EFL Championship club Swansea City.

== Club career ==
Born in England, to a Nigerian father, Iorpenda joined Huddersfield Town from Brighton & Hove Albion in 2021. He signed his first professional contract with Huddersfield in July 2022, agreeing a five-year contract with the club. On 18 March 2023, he joined Hyde United on a short-term loan in the Northern Premier League. In April 2023 Iorpenda scored a spectacular goal from his own half of the field for Huddersfield B against Brentford B. He was named Huddersfield Town's academy player of the year in May 2023.

Iorpenda began to be included in Huddersfield first team match day squads in the Autumn of 2023. He signed a new four-year contract extension with the club in October 2023. He was named among the substitutes for the FA Cup third round match away against Manchester City on 7 January 2024 and made his senior debut as a second-half substitute.

On the 10th of June 2025, Iorpenda joined League Two side Notts County on loan for the 2025–26 season. After scoring 3 goals and 7 assists, Iorpenda won Notts County's Players' player of the season, fans' player of the season and goal of the season awards after an impressive season on loan at the Magpies.

Iorpenda signed for EFL Championship club Swansea City on 31 August 2026 for an undisclosed fee.

== International career ==
Born in London, Iorpenda is also eligible to represent Nigeria through his father, meaning he can represent England, or Nigeria at international level.

== Career statistics ==
As of 15 November 2025

Appearances and goals by club, season and competition
Club	Season	League			FA Cup		League Cup		Other		Total	
Club	Season	Division	Apps	Goals	Apps	Goals	Apps	Goals	Apps	Goals	Apps	Goals
Huddersfield Town	2022–23	Championship	0	0	0	0	0	0	—		0	0
Huddersfield Town	2023–24	Championship	2	0	1	0	0	0	—		3	0
Huddersfield Town	2024–25	League One	5	0	1	0	2	0	4 (Note: Appearance(s) in EFL Trophy)	0	12	0
Huddersfield Town	2025–26	League One	0	0	0	0	0	0	0	0	0	0
Huddersfield Town	Total		7	0	2	0	2	0	4	0	15	0
Hyde United (loan)	2022–23	NPL Premier Division	7	0	0	0	—		0	0	7	0
Notts County (loan)	2025–26	League Two	46	3	0	0						
Career total			14	0	2	0	2	0	4	0	22	0

== Honours ==
Notts County

- EFL League Two play-offs: 2026
