= Diego Edwards =

Kittitian footballer

Personal information
- Date of birth: 19 June 2004 (age 22)
- Place of birth: Nottingham, England
- Position: Forward

Team information
- Current team: Notts County

Youth career
- 2011–2019: Notts County
- 2019–2023: Mansfield Town

Senior career*
Years	Team	Apps	(Gls)
2022	Mansfield Town	0	(0)
2022	→ Basford United (loan)	0	(0)
2022–	Notts County	0	(0)
2023	→ Ossett United (loan)	2	(2)
2023	→ Nuneaton Borough (loan)	1	(0)

International career^{‡}
2023–	Saint Kitts and Nevis	5	(0)
- * Club domestic league appearances and goals as of 02:39, 17 November 2023 (UTC) ‡ National team caps and goals as of 22:47, 10 June 2024 (UTC)

Diego Edwards (born 19 June 2004) is a footballer who plays as a forward for EFL League One club Notts County. Born in England, he plays for the Saint Kitts and Nevis national team.

== Club career ==
A youth product of Notts County since the age of 7, Edwards signed a scholarship contract with Mansfield Town on 3 July 2020. On 30 January 2022, he joined Basford United on loan. He returned to Notts County and signed an apprenticeship contract with them on 17 July 2023 on a 1-year contract. On 8 September 2023, he joined Northern Premier League side Ossett United on a month-long loan. He joined Nuneaton Borough on another month-long loan on 21 October 2023.

== International career ==
Born in England, Edwards is of Kittitian descent. He was called up to the Saint Kitts and Nevis national team for a set of 2023–24 CONCACAF Nations League matches. He debuted as a substitute in a 0–0 tie with Saint Lucia on 16 November 2023.
