= Lee Ndlovu =

Zimbabwean footballer (born 1994)

Personal information
- Full name: Lindokuhle Ndlovu
- Date of birth: 8 December 1994 (age 31)
- Place of birth: Bulawayo, Zimbabwe
- Height: 1.78 m (5 ft 10 in)
- Position: Striker

Team information
- Current team: Notts County
- Number: 39

Youth career
- Chicken Inn
- Highlanders
- Bantu Rovers

Senior career*
Years	Team	Apps	(Gls)
2013–2014	Oadby Town	35	(20)
2014–2015	Holbeach United	24	(16)
2015	Grantham Town	12	(7)
2015–2016	Ilkeston	21	(8)
2016–2022	Brackley Town	215	(68)
2022–2025	Boreham Wood	100	(28)
2025–2026	Barnet	40	(9)
2026–	Notts County	18	(2)
- * Club domestic league appearances and goals as of 18:40, 10 June 2026 (UTC)

Lindokuhle "Lee" Ndlovu (born 8 December 1994) is a Zimbabwean professional football player who plays as a striker for EFL League One club Notts County.

== Career ==
=== Early career ===
Ndlovu began playing football in Zimbabwe with Chicken Inn, Highlanders, and Bantu Rovers, before moving to England with non-league clubs Oadby Town, Holbeach United, Grantham Town and Ilkeston.

=== Brackley Town ===
On 13 February 2016, Ndlovu joined Brackley Town, and ended up with over 200 league appearances with the club. He started for Brackley Town when they won the 2018 FA Trophy final in a 1–1 (5–4) penalty shootout win over Bromley.

=== Boreham Wood ===
On 1 July 2022, he transferred to Boreham Wood in the National League on a 3-year contract. In his debut season 2022–23 for Boreham Wood, he scored an equalizer in the FA Cup to Accrington Stanley to earn a replay in the third round, scored a goal in the National League against Notts County to get to the semi-final playoffs, and scored again in the playoffs against Notts County as Boreham Wood lost 3–2.

=== Barnet ===
On 9 January 2025, he transferred to Barnet on a 2.5-year contract. He helped Barnet win the 2024–25 National League and earn promotion to the EFL League Two.

=== Notts County ===
On 24 January 2026, Ndlovu joined Notts County for an undisclosed fee, on an 18-month contract with a one-year option.

== International career ==
Born in Zimbabwe, Ndlovu moved to England at a young age. In 2023, he made himself available for selection by Zimbabwe.

== Personal life ==
Despite his surname, Lee holds no relations to the retired Zimbabwean footballer Peter Ndlovu.

== Honours ==
Brackley Town

- FA Trophy: 2017–18

Barnet

- National League: 2024–25

Notts County

- EFL League Two play-offs: 2026
