= Jayden Luker =

English footballer (born 2005)

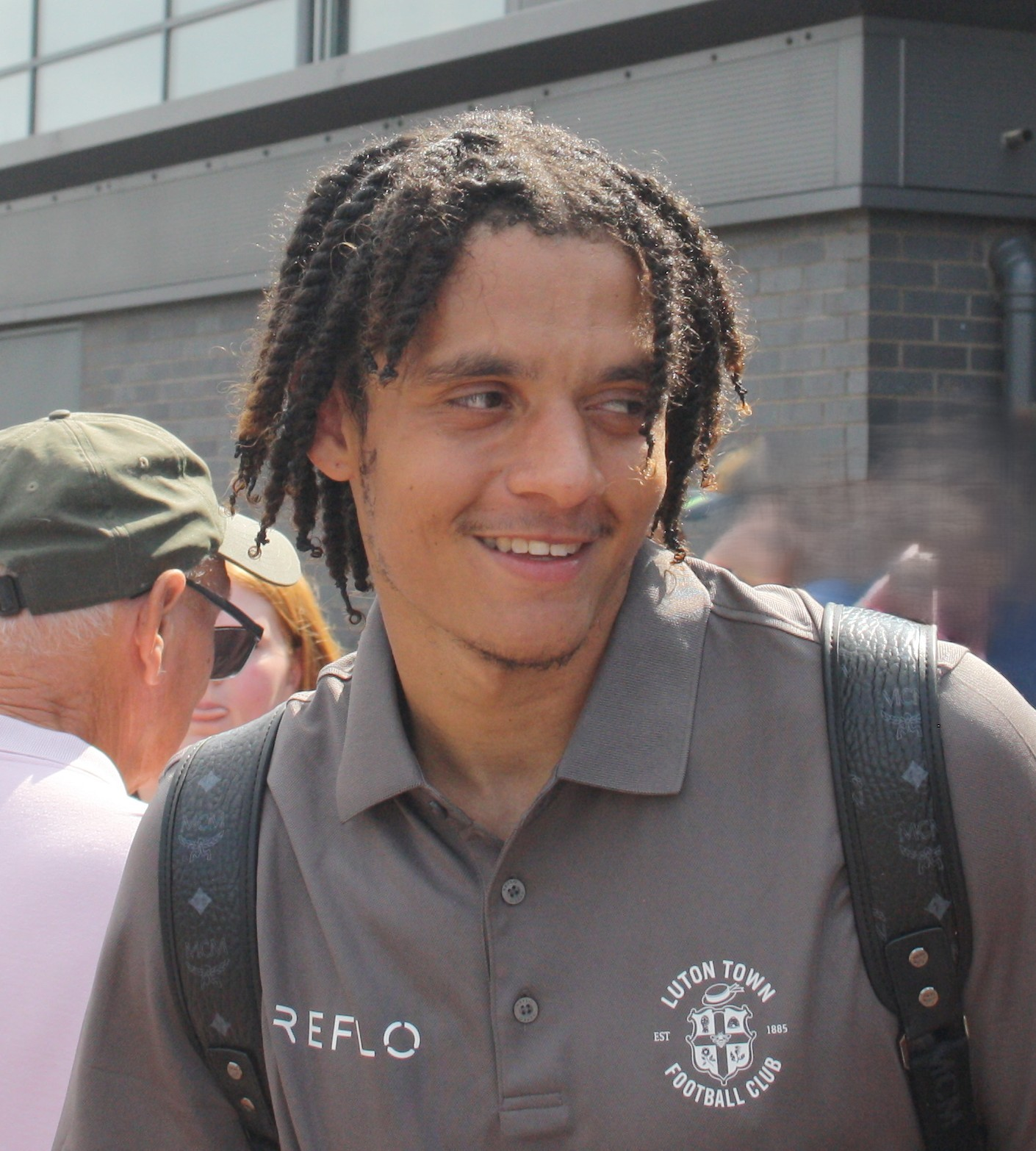
- Luker in 2026

Personal information
- Full name: Jayden Joshua Luker
- Date of birth: 30 April 2005 (age 21)
- Place of birth: Southwark, England
- Height: 6 ft 0 in (1.82 m)
- Positions: Right winger; forward

Team information
- Current team: Luton Town
- Number: 19

Youth career
- –2022: Lambeth Tigers
- 2022: ProDirect Academy
- 2022–2023: Luton Town

Senior career*
Years	Team	Apps	(Gls)
2023–	Luton Town	0	(0)
2024	→ Woking (loan)	17	(2)
2024–2025	→ Grimsby Town (loan)	22	(3)
2025–2026	→ Notts County (loan)	12	(2)
- * Club domestic league appearances and goals as of 15:43, 25 May 2026 (UTC)

Jayden Joshua Luker (born 30 April 2005) is an English footballer who plays as a right winger or forward for EFL League One club Luton Town.

== Career ==
Luker came through the academy at Lambeth Tigers playing at under 7 to under 16 level, before signing for Luton Town in July 2022, after impressing whilst playing against them for the Pro Direct Academy in the previous campaign.

In January 2023, Luker was named on the first team bench for the first time during an FA Cup Third Round tie against Wigan Athletic, which came about after some impressive displays in the Hatters academy and after he'd started all three of Luton's FA Youth Cup games.

On 23 November 2023, after featuring on the bench as an unused substitute on four occasions during the 2023–24 campaign, Luker signed a new contract with The Hatters of an undisclosed length.

In January 2024, Luker joined National League side Woking on loan until the end of the season, and after making 17 appearances for The Cardinals, scoring twice; Luker returned to parent club, Luton Town at the conclusion of the loan.

On 30 August 2024, after featuring in pre-season friendlies for Luton Town, Luker was loaned out again, this time to League Two side Grimsby Town. Luker made his first appearance for Grimsby on 8 October 2024, starting in the 2–1 loss to Lincoln City in the EFL Trophy Group Stage. His first league appearance came as a substitute in the 3–1 home loss to MK Dons on 26 October 2024. He scored his first league goal in the 5–2 home victory over Accrington Stanley on 3 December 2024, scoring from the edge of the box.

On 29 July 2025, Luker returned to League Two on a further season-long loan, joining Notts County.

== Career statistics ==
As of match played 8 August 2026

Appearances and goals by club, season and competition
Club	Season	League			FA Cup		League Cup		Other		Total	
Club	Season	Division	Apps	Goals	Apps	Goals	Apps	Goals	Apps	Goals	Apps	Goals
Luton Town	2022–23	Championship	0	0	0	0	0	0	0	0	0	0
Luton Town	2023–24	Premier League	0	0	0	0	0	0	—		0	0
Luton Town	2024–25	Championship	0	0	0	0	0	0	—		0	0
Luton Town	2025–26	League One	0	0	0	0	0	0	0	0	0	0
Luton Town	2026–27	League One	0	0	0	0	1	0	0	0	1	0
Luton Town	Total		0	0	0	0	1	0	0	0	1	0
Woking (loan)	2023–24	National League	17	2	—		—		—		17	2
Grimsby Town (loan)	2024–25	League Two	22	3	1	0	0	0	3 (Note: Appearance(s) in EFL Trophy)	0	26	3
Notts County (loan)	2025–26	League Two	12	2	0	0	1	0	4 (Note: One appearance in the EFL Trophy, three appearances and one goal in the League Two play-offs)	1	17	3
Career total			51	7	1	0	2	0	7	1	61	8

== Honours ==
Notts County

- EFL League Two play-offs: 2026
