= Jodi Jones (footballer) =

Maltese footballer (born 1997)

Personal information
- Full name: Jodi Felice Jones
- Date of birth: 22 October 1997 (age 29)
- Place of birth: Bow, England
- Height: 1.77 m (5 ft 10 in)
- Position: Winger

Team information
- Current team: Bromley
- Number: 10

Youth career
- Arsenal
- West Ham United
- 2009–2015: Dagenham & Redbridge

Senior career*
Years	Team	Apps	(Gls)
2015–2016	Dagenham & Redbridge	35	(4)
2016	→ Coventry City (loan)	6	(0)
2016–2022	Coventry City	70	(7)
2022–2023	Oxford United	5	(0)
2023	→ Notts County (loan)	16	(0)
2023–2026	Notts County	100	(19)
2026–	Bromley	0	(0)

International career^{‡}
2022–	Malta	17	(0)
- * Club domestic league appearances and goals as of 00:05, 2 September 2026 (UTC) ‡ National team caps and goals as of 12 October 2025 (UTC)

Jodi Felice Jones (born 22 October 1997) is a professional footballer who plays as a winger for EFL League One club Bromley. Born in England, he plays for the Malta national team.

== Club career ==
=== Dagenham & Redbridge ===
Jones was born in Bow, London, and started his career with the renowned local junior side Senrab. He later joined the youth system at Dagenham & Redbridge at under-13 level and in the summer of 2014 he started a two-year scholarship with the club. He usually credits Ivo Drury for his early development, seeing him as a mentor. In November 2014, despite still being a first-year scholar, he was handed a squad number with the first team ahead of the league fixture against Bury, after he had impressed in an Essex Senior Cup tie win over Concord Rangers. However, he did not make the bench and was not included in the first-team squad until January 2015, when he was an unused substitute against Cambridge United. He made his first-team debut in February 2015, as a last-minute substitute for Alex Jakubiak in a 0–0 draw with Portsmouth. In the process he became the youngest Dagenham & Redbridge player to appear in a league game, beating the previous record set by Dominic Green. In March 2015, he signed his first professional contract on a two-year deal until 2017. In April 2015, Jones made his full debut for the Daggers in a 4–0 home win over Accrington Stanley, scoring in the final minute with his first goal for the club.

=== Coventry City ===
On 18 March 2016, Jones joined Coventry City on an emergency loan deal with the view to a permanent deal at the end of the season. After a successful loan spell, Jones signed a four-year deal with the Sky Blues on 10 May 2016 for an undisclosed fee, which began on 1 July 2016. He scored his first goal for Coventry in an EFL Trophy tie against Northampton Town on 4 October 2016. He came on as a substitute as Coventry won the 2017 EFL Trophy final.

On the first day of the 2017–18 league season against Notts County he scored a hat-trick in a 3–0 win. Later on that season, he picked up an injury to his anterior cruciate ligament, which saw him sidelined for the rest of the 2017–18 season and all of the 2018–19 season.

=== Oxford United ===
On 29 July 2022, Jones signed a one-year contract, with the option for a further year, with Oxford United.

=== Notts County ===
On 26 January 2023, Jones signed for National League club Notts County on loan until the end of the season. He scored the winning goal in the last minute of extra time against Boreham Wood in the National League play-off semi-final. Following the club's promotion with a penalty shoot-out victory over Chesterfield, he was offered permanent terms; he signed a permanent two-year deal with Notts County on 23 May 2023.

On 13 January 2024, Notts County played Grimsby Town in a 5–5 draw. Jones assisted four goals in the match, making him the first player to assist four goals (top four tiers) since Harry Kane against Southampton in September 2020. Having assisted six in total across the month, equalling the league's season record of seventeen, Jones was awarded the EFL League Two Player of the Month award. In total, Jones contributed 24 assists throughout the season to break the record for most assists in an English professional league during a season which was previously held jointly by Kevin De Bruyne and Thierry Henry with 20. His performances throughout the season saw him included in the League Two Team of the Season as well as being named as the Player of the Season for League Two and for his club Notts County. On 12 September 2024, Jones signed a two-year contract extension with Notts County, keeping him with the club until the summer of 2027.

=== Bromley ===
Jones signed with fellow League One club Bromley on 1 September 2026 for an undisclosed fee.

== International career ==
Jones was born in England and is of Maltese descent through his mother. On 9 September 2022, he had his first call up to the Malta national team for a set of UEFA Nations League matches. He debuted with Malta in a 2–1 UEFA Nations League loss to Estonia on 23 September 2022.

== Career statistics ==
As of 4 August 2026

Appearances and goals by club, season and competition
Club	Season	League			FA Cup		League Cup		Other		Total	
Club	Season	Division	Apps	Goals	Apps	Goals	Apps	Goals	Apps	Goals	Apps	Goals
Dagenham & Redbridge	2014–15	League Two	8	1	0	0	0	0	0	0	8	1
Dagenham & Redbridge	2015–16	League Two	27	3	3	0	1	0	1 (Note: Appearance in Football League Trophy)	0	32	3
Dagenham & Redbridge	Total		35	4	3	0	1	0	1	0	40	4
Coventry City (loan)	2015–16	League One	6	0	—		—		—		6	0
Coventry City	2016–17	League One	34	1	2	0	1	0	8 (Note: Appearance(s) in EFL Trophy)	1	45	2
Coventry City	2017–18	League Two	19	5	1	0	1	0	1	0	22	5
Coventry City	2018–19	League One	8	1	1	0	0	0	1	0	10	1
Coventry City	2019–20	League One	0	0	1	0	0	0	1	0	2	0
Coventry City	2020–21	Championship	0	0	0	0	0	0	—		0	0
Coventry City	2021–22	Championship	9	0	2	0	1	0	—		12	0
Coventry City	Total		76	7	7	0	3	0	11	1	97	8
Oxford United	2022–23	League One	5	0	1	0	1	0	1	0	8	0
Notts County (loan)	2022–23	National League	16	0	0	0	0	0	2 (Note: Appearances in National League play-offs)	1	18	1
Notts County	2023–24	League Two	43	6	2	0	1	0	0	0	46	6
Notts County	2024–25	League Two	20	5	0	0	1	0	2 (Note: Appearances in League Two play-offs)	0	23	5
Notts County	2025–26	League Two	37	8	1	1	1	0	3 (Note: Appearances in League Two play-offs)	1	42	10
Notts County	Total		100	19	3	1	3	0	5	1	111	21
Career total			238	30	14	1	8	0	20	3	280	34

=== International ===
As of match played 4 September 2025

National team	Year	Apps	Goals
Malta	2022	4	0
Malta	2023	8	0
Malta	2025	3	0
Total		15	0

== Honours ==
Coventry City

- EFL Trophy: 2016–17

Notts County

- National League play-offs: 2023
- EFL League Two play-offs: 2026

Individual

- EFL League Two Player of the Month: January 2024
- EFL League Two Team of the Season: 2023–24
- EFL League Two Player of the Season: 2023–24
- Notts County Supporters' Player of the Season: 2023–24
- PFA Team of the Year: 2023–24 League Two
- PFA League Two Player of the Year: 2023–24
