= Lucas Ness =

English footballer (born 2002)

Personal information
- Full name: Lucas Benjamin Ness
- Date of birth: 7 February 2002 (age 24)
- Place of birth: Kingston upon Thames, England
- Height: 1.91 m (6 ft 3 in)
- Position: Defender

Team information
- Current team: Notts County
- Number: 12

Youth career
- 2013–2020: Metropolitan Police
- 2020–2022: Charlton Athletic

Senior career*
| Years | Team | Apps | (Gls) |
| 2019–2020 | Metropolitan Police | 7 | (0) |
| 2020–2024 | Charlton Athletic | 29 | (0) |
| 2022 | → Hampton & Richmond Borough (loan) | 13 | (0) |
| 2022 | → Torquay United (loan) | 6 | (0) |
| 2024– | Notts County | 34 | (2) |
- * Club domestic league appearances and goals as of 17:10, 9 May 2026 (UTC)

Lucas Benjamin Ness (born 7 February 2002) is an English professional footballer who plays as a defender for EFL League One club Notts County.

== Career ==
=== Charlton Athletic ===
Coming through the youth ranks at the Metropolitan Police, Ness joined Charlton Athletic having made nine first team appearances for the Metropolitan Police in 2019; seven of which were in the league and two further in the FA Cup.

Ness made his full first-team professional debut for Charlton on 30 September 2020 in a 1–1 EFL Trophy draw with Brighton & Hove Albion U21s.

Ness made his second appearance for the club, the following season, coming on as a second-half substitute – on 4 January 2022 – in a 1–0 win over Milton Keynes Dons in Round Three of the EFL Trophy.

On 19 April 2024, it was confirmed that Charlton had triggered the one-year extension clause in Ness' contract, keeping him at the club until the summer of 2025.

==== Hampton & Richmond Borough (loan) ====
On 11 February 2022, Ness joined Hampton & Richmond Borough on a month's loan. On 18 March 2022, Ness's loan was extended until the end of the season.

==== Torquay United (loan) ====
On 29 October 2022, Ness joined Torquay United on a month's loan.

On 1 December 2022, it was confirmed that Ness had been recalled by Charlton having made eight first–team appearances for Torquay United.

=== Notts County ===
On 22 August 2024, Ness signed for Notts County on a three-year contract - with the club holding an option to extend by a further year - for an undisclosed fee. A sell-on clause has been included as part of the deal.

== Career statistics ==
As of match played 25 May 2026

Appearances and goals by club, season and competition
| Club | Season | League | | | FA Cup | | EFL Cup | | Other | | Total | |
| Club | Season | Division | Apps | Goals | Apps | Goals | Apps | Goals | Apps | Goals | Apps | Goals |
|---|---|---|---|---|---|---|---|---|---|---|---|---|
| Metropolitan Police | 2019–20 | Southern League; Premier Division South | 7 | 0 | 2 | 0 | — | | 0 | 0 | 9 | 0 |
| Charlton Athletic | 2020–21 | League One | 0 | 0 | 0 | 0 | 0 | 0 | 1 (Note: One appearance in the EFL Trophy) | 0 | 1 | 0 |
| Charlton Athletic | 2021–22 | League One | 0 | 0 | 0 | 0 | 0 | 0 | 1 | 0 | 1 | 0 |
| Charlton Athletic | 2022–23 | League One | 15 | 0 | 0 | 0 | 4 | 0 | 2 (Note: Two appearances in the EFL Trophy) | 0 | 21 | 0 |
| Charlton Athletic | 2023–24 | League One | 14 | 0 | 3 | 0 | 1 | 0 | 3 (Note: Three appearances in the EFL Trophy) | 0 | 21 | 0 |
| Charlton Athletic | Charlton Athletic total | | 29 | 0 | 3 | 0 | 5 | 0 | 7 | 0 | 44 | 0 |
| Hampton & Richmond Borough (loan) | 2021–22 | National League South | 13 | 0 | — | | — | | 1 (Note: One appearance in the Middlesex Senior Cup) | 0 | 14 | 0 |
| Torquay United (loan) | 2022–23 | National League | 6 | 0 | 2 | 0 | — | | 0 | 0 | 8 | 0 |
| Notts County | 2024–25 | League Two | 7 | 0 | 2 | 0 | 0 | 0 | 2 | 0 | 11 | 0 |
| Notts County | 2025–26 | League Two | 27 | 2 | 1 | 0 | 0 | 0 | 6 (Note: Three appearances in the EFL Trophy and three appearances and one goal in the EFL League Two play-offs) | 1 | 34 | 3 |
| Notts County | Notts County total | | 34 | 2 | 3 | 0 | 0 | 0 | 8 | 1 | 45 | 3 |
| Career total | | | 89 | 2 | 10 | 0 | 5 | 0 | 16 | 1 | 120 | 3 |

== Honours ==
Notts County

- EFL League Two play-offs: 2026
