= 2026 EFL play-offs =

English Football League play-offs
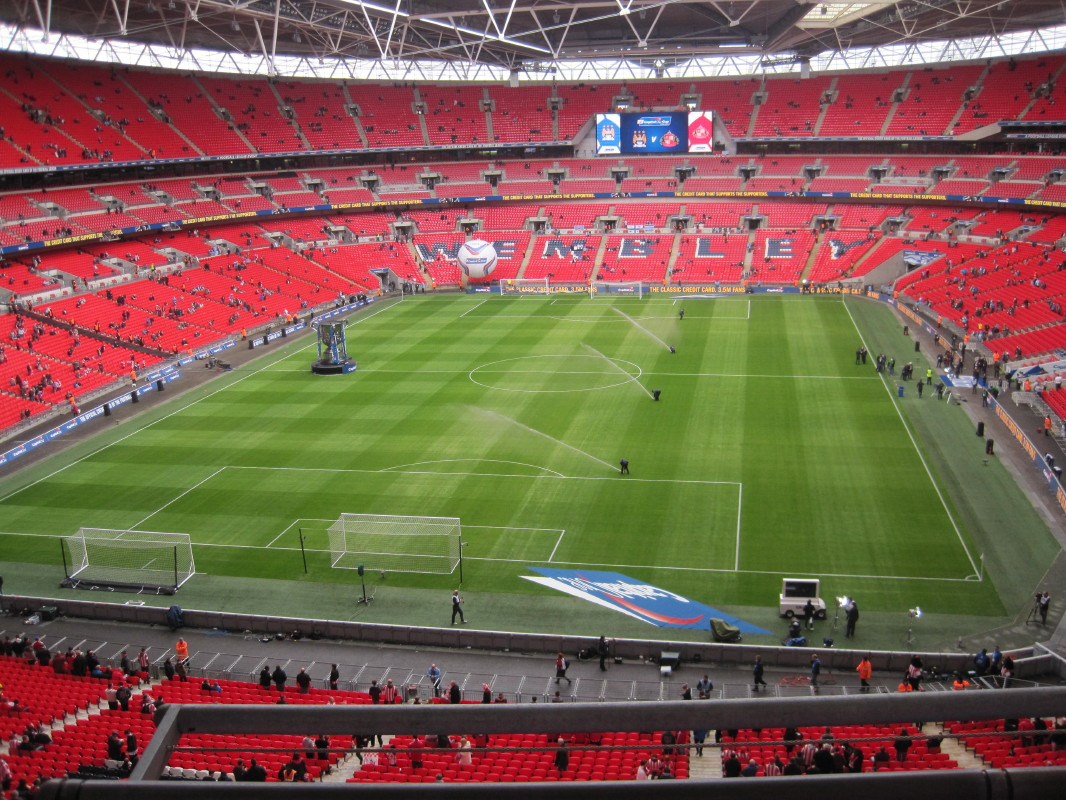
- Wembley Stadium was the venue for each play-off final
- Season: 2025–26
- Premier League (Promoted): Hull City
- EFL Championship (Promoted): Bolton Wanderers
- EFL League One (Promoted): Notts County

The English Football League play-offs for the 2025–26 season (referred to as the Sky Bet Play-Offs for sponsorship reasons) were held in May 2026 with all finals staged at Wembley Stadium in London.

The play-offs began in each league with two semi-finals which were played over two legs. The teams who finished in 3rd to 6th place in the Championship and League One and the 4th to 7th-placed teams in League Two competed. The winners of the semi-finals advanced to the finals, with the finals winners gaining promotion for the following season.

== Background ==
The English Football League play-offs have been held every year since 1987. They take place for each division following the conclusion of the regular season and are contested by the four clubs finishing below the automatic promotion places. The fixtures are determined by final league position – in the Championship and League One this is 3rd v 6th and 4th v 5th, while in League Two it is 4th v 7th and 5th v 6th.

== Championship ==
=== Championship semi-finals ===
The final table was confirmed after the final matchday on 2 May 2026. Going into the final day, Southampton had already confirmed a place in the play-offs at fifth place. Southampton leapfrogged Middlesbrough after the Saints beat Preston North End and Middlesbrough drew 2–2 against Wrexham. Ipswich, Millwall and Middlesbrough all had the opportunity to finish in second place with Ipswich occupying it at the start of the day. Ipswich won their match which meant Millwall and Middlesbrough had their playoff places confirmed. Hull City, Wrexham and Derby County were all in the hunt for the last spot. Hull City leapfrogged Wrexham after their win against ninth place Norwich, and help from fourth place Middlesbrough who held Wrexham to a 2–2 draw. Derby County lost 2–1 to 13th place Sheffield United, eliminating them from play-off contention.

Final league position – Championship
Pos	Team	Pld	W	D	L	GF	GA	GD	Pts
3	Millwall	46	24	11	11	64	48	+15	83
4	Southampton	46	22	14	10	82	56	+26	80
5	Middlesbrough	46	22	14	10	72	47	+25	80
6	Hull City	46	21	10	15	70	66	+4	73

First leg

8 May 2026
20:00 BST

Hull City	0–0	Millwall
	Report

MKM Stadium, Kingston upon Hull
Attendance: 24,623
Referee: Gavin Ward
9 May 2026
12:30 BST

Middlesbrough	0–0	Southampton
	Report

Riverside Stadium, Middlesbrough
Attendance: 32,045
Referee: Farai Hallam

Second leg

11 May 2026
20:00 BST

Millwall	0–2	Hull City
	Report	Belloumi 64'; Gelhardt 79'

The Den, London
Attendance: 17,768
Referee: Sam Barrott

Hull City won 2–0 on aggregate.

12 May 2026
20:00 BST

Southampton	2–1 (a.e.t.)	Middlesbrough
Stewart 45+1'; Charles 116'	Report	McGree 5'

St Mary's Stadium, Southampton
Attendance: 30,277
Referee: Andrew Madley

Southampton won 2–1 on aggregate; however, Middlesbrough advanced to the final on walkover after Southampton were disqualified for spying on other teams (see Southampton F.C. espionage incident).

=== Championship final ===
Hull City won this match and therefore joined champions Coventry City and automatically promoted Ipswich Town in playing in the 2026–27 Premier League.

23 May 2026
15:30 BST

Hull City	1−0	Middlesbrough
McBurnie 90+5'	Report

Wembley Stadium, London
Attendance: 84,506
Referee: Jarred Gillett

== League One ==
=== League One semi-finals ===
The final table was confirmed after the final matchday on 3 May 2026. Going into the final day, Bolton Wanderers had already qualified for the play-offs. On the final day Stockport County, Bradford City, Stevenage, Luton Town, and Plymouth Argyle were all chasing a play-off spot. Stockport and Bradford both won and leapfrogged 3rd place Bolton, who lost to play-off hopefuls Luton. Plymouth won as well, but as Stevenage also won, they qualified in the final spot at the expense of Luton and Plymouth. On the final day, everyone except the already qualified Bolton won their match, which caused them to drop from 3rd to 5th and lose the home advantage.

Final league position – League One
Pos	Team	Pld	W	D	L	GF	GA	GD	Pts
3	Stockport County	46	22	11	13	71	58	+13	77
4	Bradford City	46	22	11	13	58	51	+7	77
5	Bolton Wanderers	46	19	18	9	70	52	+18	75
6	Stevenage	46	21	12	13	49	46	+3	75

First leg

9 May 2026
15:00 BST

Stevenage	0–1	Stockport County
	Report	Osborn 90+4'

Broadhall Way, Stevenage
Attendance: 7,321
Referee: Charles Breakspear
9 May 2026
20:00 BST

Bolton Wanderers	1–0	Bradford City
Cozier-Duberry 60'	Report

Toughsheet Community Stadium, Bolton
Attendance: 22,789
Referee: Martin Coy

Second leg

13 May 2026
20:00 BST

Stockport County	2–0	Stevenage
Barry 14'; Wootton 28'	Report

Edgeley Park, Stockport
Attendance: 10,243
Referee: Josh Smith

Stockport County won 3–0 on aggregate.

14 May 2026
20:00 BST

Bradford City	0–1	Bolton Wanderers
	Report	Simons 81'

University of Bradford Stadium, Bradford
Attendance: 22,381
Referee: Thomas Kirk

Bolton Wanderers won 2–0 on aggregate.

=== League One final ===
Bolton Wanderers won this match and therefore joined champions Lincoln City and automatically promoted Cardiff City in playing in the 2026–27 EFL Championship.

24 May 2026
13:00 BST

Stockport County	1–4	Bolton Wanderers
Sidibeh 29'	Report	Rodrigues 3', 90+4' (pen.); Wootton 64' (o.g.); Dalby 81'

Wembley Stadium, London
Attendance: 48,268
Referee: Josh Smith

== League Two ==
=== League Two semi-finals ===
The final table was confirmed after the final matchday on 2 May 2026. Going into the final day, Cambridge United, Salford City, Notts County, and Grimsby Town had already secured a play-off place with all but Grimsby Town still capable of automatic promotion. Cambridge United clinched the last automatic spot as both teams drew, consigning Salford City to the playoffs. Chesterfield, Swindon Town, and Barnet were all in contention for the last play-off spot. Barnet won against relegation-threatened Harrogate Town condemning them to relegation, but Chesterfield beat Swindon Town eliminating them both in the process and leapfrogging Grimsby Town who had already qualified with Chesterfield and Swindon Town playing each other on the final matchday.

Final league position – League Two
Pos	Team	Pld	W	D	L	GF	GA	GD	Pts
4	Salford City	46	25	6	15	61	51	+10	81
5	Notts County	46	24	8	14	74	52	+22	80
6	Chesterfield	46	21	16	9	71	56	+15	79
7	Grimsby Town	46	22	12	12	74	50	+24	78

First leg

10 May 2026
15:00 BST

Grimsby Town	1–2	Salford City
Staunton 1'	Report	Cesay 4'; Oluwo 40'

Blundell Park, Cleethorpes
Attendance: 8,115
Referee: Matthew Corlett
10 May 2026
18:00 BST

Chesterfield	0–1	Notts County
	Report	Luker 28'

SMH Group Stadium, Chesterfield
Attendance: 10,014
Referee: Will Finnie

Second leg

15 May 2026
19:15 BST

Salford City	2–2 (a.e.t.)	Grimsby Town
Udoh 53'; Cesay 117'	Report	Green 74'; Kabia 78'

The Peninsula Stadium, Salford
Attendance: 4,500
Referee: Ben Speedie

Salford City won 4–3 on aggregate.

15 May 2026
20:00 BST

Notts County	0–0	Chesterfield
	Report

Meadow Lane, Nottingham
Attendance: 17,224
Referee: Thomas Parsons

Notts County won 1–0 on aggregate.

=== League Two final ===
Notts County won this match and therefore joined champions Bromley and automatically promoted Milton Keynes Dons and Cambridge United in playing in the 2026–27 EFL League One.

25 May 2026
15:00 BST

Salford City	0–3	Notts County
	Report	Jatta 32'; Ness 45'; Jones 70'

Wembley Stadium, London
Attendance: 30,851
Referee: Tom Reeves
