= 2026–27 Notts County F.C. season =

163rd season in existence of Notts County FC

Notts County
2026–27 season
- Owner: Alexander and Christoffer Reedtz
- Chairman: Christoffer Reedtz
- Head coach: Martin Paterson
- Stadium: Meadow Lane

The 2026–27 season is the 163rd season in the history of Notts County Football Club and their first season back being in League One since the 2014–15 season, following promotion via the play-offs from League Two in the preceding season. In addition to the domestic league, the club also participate in the FA Cup, the EFL Cup, and the EFL Trophy.

== Transfers and contracts ==
=== In ===
Date	Pos.	Player	From	Fee	Ref.
27 June 2026	CM	(Republic of Ireland) Darius Lipsiuc	(England) Stoke City	Undisclosed	
1 July 2026 (Note: The transfer was announced on 29 May, and would become official on July 1 once Gibbons' contract at Cambridge United had expired.)	RB	(England) James Gibbons	(England) Cambridge United	Free	
1 July 2026 (Note: The transfer was announced on 29 May, and would become official on July 1 once Roberts' contract at Scunthorpe United had expired.)	RW	(England) Callum Roberts	(England) Scunthorpe United	Free	
1 July 2026 (Note: The transfer was announced on 3 June, and would become official on July 1 once Sanders' contract at Crewe Alexandra had expired.)	CM	(England) Max Sanders	(England) Crewe Alexandra	Free	
8 July 2026	CF	(England) Emile Acquah	(Scotland) Dundee	Undisclosed	
17 July 2026	CB	(Wales) Matt Baker	(Wales) Newport County	Free	
24 July 2026	CDM	(England) Jack Evans	(England) Harrogate Town	Undisclosed	
27 July 2026	CF	(Australia) Luka Smyth	(Finland) VPS	£125,000	
7 August 2026	CDM	(Scotland) Dean Campbell	(England) Northampton Town	£200,000	
1 September 2026	LB	(England) Rosaire Longelo	(England) Salford City	Undisclosed	

=== Out ===
Date	Pos.	Player	To	Fee	Ref.
4 July 2026	CF	(England) Matthew Dennis	(England) Burton Albion	Undisclosed	
29 July 2026	CF	(The Gambia) Alassana Jatta	(Portugal) Casa Pia	Undisclosed	
4 August 2026	CB	(England) Alfie Rice	(England) Blackburn Rovers	Compensation	
1 September 2026	RW	(Malta) Jodi Jones	(England) Bromley	Undisclosed	

=== Loaned in ===
Date	Pos.	Player	From	Loaned until	Ref.
3 August 2026	CAM	(Wales) Ollie Cooper	(Wales) Swansea City	End of season (Note: Option to make the move permanent at the conclusion of the loan deal)	
11 August 2026	RB	(England) Ishe Samuels-Smith	(England) Chelsea	End of season	
11 August 2026	CAM	(Sierra Leone) Hindolo Mustapha	(England) Crystal Palace	End of season	
29 August 2026	CDM	(Republic of Ireland) Rory Finneran	(England) Newcastle United	End of season	
31 August 2026	CF	(Sierra Leone) Daniel Kanu	(England) Charlton Athletic	End of season	

=== Loaned out ===
Date	Pos.	Player	To	Loaned until	Ref.
7 August 2026	CF	(England) Harrison Iwunze	(England) Hereford	2 January 2027	
14 August 2026	CM	(England) Ryley Reynolds	(England) Grimsby Town	End of Season	
25 September 2026	CB	(Republic of Ireland) Luke Browne	(England) Torquay United	24 October 2026	
25 September 2026	CM	(England) Kameron Muir	(England) Hereford	27 November 2026 (Note: On 27 October, Muir's initial one-month loan at Hereford was extended for a second month.)	
30 October 2026	RW	(Afghanistan) Maz Kouhyar	(England) Kidderminster Harriers	1 January 2027	

=== Released / Out of Contract ===
Date	Pos.	Player	Subsequent club	Joined date	Ref.
30 June 2026	CF	(England) Charlie Gill	(England) Basford United	1 July 2026	
30 June 2026	CM	(Grenada) Oliver Norburn	(England) Oldham Athletic	1 July 2026	
30 June 2026	LM	(Spain) Madou Cisse	(England) Quorn	17 July 2026	
30 June 2026	LWB	(England) Keanan Bennetts	(Germany) Ingolstadt 04	18 July 2026	
30 June 2026	CM	(England) Daniel Adiefeh	ilkeston Town	10th August 2026	
30 June 2026	CB	(England) Owen Bickley			
30 June 2026	CB	(England) Frankie Devereux			
30 June 2026	RWB	(England) Carter Foxe			
30 June 2026	CAM	(England) Alfie Goodwin			
30 June 2026	CDM	(England) Jack Hinchy	(England) Altrincham	1 July 2026	
30 June 2026	CB	(England) Stanley Hipkiss			
30 June 2026	CB	(England) Ellis Martin			
30 June 2026	GK	(Bermuda) Milai Perott	Corby Town	17th August 2026	
30 June 2026	CB	(Wales) Theo Robinson	Ilkeston Town	8th August 2026	
30 June 2026	CF	(England) James Sanderson			
30 June 2026	CF	(England) Isaac Smart			
30 June 2026	CF	(England) Yerim Zoko	Mickleover Fc	14th August 2026	
1 August 2026	CF	(Guinea) Maï Traoré			
2 September 2026	GK	(Netherlands) Kelle Roos			

=== New Contract ===
Date	Pos.	Player	Contracted until	Ref.
28 May 2026	RW	(Afghanistan) Maziar Kouhyar	30 June 2027	
28 May 2026	CB	(England) Matthew Platt	30 June 2027	
28 May 2026	LWB	(Cyprus) Nick Tsaroulla	30 June 2027	
23 June 2026	CB	(England) Rod McDonald	30 June 2027	
3 July 2026	CB	(Scotland) Lewis Macari	30 June 2027 (Note: Option of a further year in the club's favour)	
13 July 2026	CF	(England) Zac Denman	Undisclosed (Note: First professional contract)	
13 July 2026	CM	(England) Jesse Friend	Undisclosed	
13 July 2026	CM	(England) Harrison Hazard	Undisclosed	
13 July 2026	GK	(England) Harvey Lawson	Undisclosed	
13 July 2026	CB	(England) Elias Reaney	Undisclosed	
25 August 2026	CM	(England) Kameron Muir	30 June 2029	

== Pre-season and friendlies ==
On 1 June, Notts announced a pre-season tour to Denmark with two friendlies against Danish Superliga sides Viborg and Randers along with a trip to Alfreton Town before the tour. On 24 June, a trip to Walsall was confirmed. Five days later, it was announced Nottingham Forest would visit as part of the pre-season preparations. On 24 July, a behind-closed-doors friendly at West Bromwich Albion was added.

Win Draw Loss Fixtures

4 July 2026 Friendly	Alfreton Town	0–5	Notts County	Alfreton
15:00 BST		Report	Gibbons 23'; Sanders 34'; Iwunze 52' (pen.); Grant 71'; Robertson 90'	Stadium: Solana Stadium

11 July 2026 Friendly	Viborg	2–0	Notts County	Viborg, Denmark
13:00 CEST	Dorian Jr. 50', 57'	Report		Stadium: Energi Viborg Arena

14 July 2026 Friendly	Randers	3–1	Notts County	Randers, Denmark
18:00 CEST	Trialist 4'; Sankoh 55'; Seck 90'	Report	Acquah 66' (pen.)	Stadium: Cepheus Park Rangers

18 July 2026 Friendly	Notts County	0–2	Nottingham Forest	Nottingham
15:00 BST		Report	Jesus 27'; Kalimuendo 54'	Stadium: Meadow Lane; Attendance: 14,455 (6,000 away)

25 July 2026 Friendly	West Bromwich Albion	1–3	Notts County	Great Barr
12:00 BST		Report	Evans; Browne; Acquah	Stadium: Fitlife Foods Performance Centre; Attendance: 0 (BCD)

28 July 2026 Friendly	Notts County	2–1	Barrow	Nottingham
13:00 BST	Ndlovu; Acquah	Report		Stadium: Meadow Lane; Attendance: 0 (BCD)

1 August 2026 Friendly	Walsall	0–0	Notts County	Bescot
15:00 BST		Report		Stadium: Pallet-Track Bescot Stadium

3 October 2026 Friendly	Stoke City	1–0	Notts County	Trent Vale
13:00 BST	Bombino	Report		Stadium: Clayton Wood Training Ground; Attendance: 0 (BCD)

== Competitions ==
=== League One ===
==== League table ====
Pos	Team	Pld	W	D	L	GF	GA	GD	Pts	Promotion, qualification or relegation
17	Wigan Athletic	16	5	2	9	15	24	−9	17	
18	AFC Wimbledon	15	4	4	7	11	25	−14	16	
19	Notts County	13	3	5	5	13	15	−2	14	
20	Doncaster Rovers	14	3	4	7	16	24	−8	13	
21	Peterborough United	14	3	4	7	13	23	−10	13	Relegation to EFL League Two

Updated to match(es) played on 21 November 2026. Source: EFL Official Website
Rules for classification: 1) Points; 2) Goal difference; 3) Number of goals scored; 4) Head-to-head results; 5) Wins; 6) Away goals; 7) Penalty points (sec 9.5); 8) 12-point sending off offences

==== Results summary ====
Overall								Home						Away					
Pld	W	D	L	GF	GA	GD	Pts	W	D	L	GF	GA	GD	W	D	L	GF	GA	GD
12	3	5	4	13	14	−1	14	2	2	2	7	6	+1	1	3	2	6	8	−2

Last updated: 31 October 2026.
Source: Soccerway

==== Results by round ====
Round	1	2	3	4	5	6	7	10	11	12	13	14	15^{3}	16	17	18	19	9^{2}	20	21	22	23	24	8^{1}
Ground	H	A	H	A	A	H	A	H	A	H	H	A	A	H	A	H	H	A	A	H	A	A	H	H
Result	D	D	W	D	D	L	L	L	L	W	D	W	P											
Position	16	14	6	10	12	16	20	22	23	18	19	17	P											
Points	1	2	5	6	7	7	7	7	7	10	11	14	P											

Source: EFL
A = Away; H = Home; W = Win; D = Draw; L = Loss; P = Postponed
Notes:
- ^{1} Matchday 8 (vs. Blackpool) was postponed due to international call-ups.
- ^{2} Matchday 9 (vs. Peterborough United) was postponed due to international call-ups.
- ^{3} Matchday 15 (vs. Bromley) was postponed due to international call-ups.

==== Matches ====
On 25 June, the League One fixtures were revealed.

Win Draw Loss Fixtures

15 August 2026 1	Notts County	1–1	Leicester City	Nottingham
12:30 BST	Evans (yellow card) 15'; Gibbons (yellow card) 43'; Grant 81'	Report	Alves (yellow card) 44'; Joseph 62'	Stadium: Meadow Lane; Attendance: 17,172 (2,124 away); Referee: Edward Duckworth

22 August 2026 2	Luton Town	2–2	Notts County	Luton
12:30 BST	Johnston (yellow card) 32'; Wells 42' (pen.), (yellow card) 56'; Naismith (yellow card) 45'; Palmer (yellow card) 47'; Marshall 68'; Walsh (yellow card) 90+3'	Report	Smyth (yellow card) 31'; Robertson (yellow card) 39'; Roberts 45+1'; Cooper 61'; Mustapha (yellow card) 90+3'	Stadium: Kenilworth Road; Attendance: 11,515; Referee: Benjamin Speedie
Note: Fixture was initially scheduled for a 15:00 kick-off, but was brought forward for live Sky Sports.

29 August 2026 3	Notts County	2–1	Burton Albion	Nottingham
15:00 BST	Finneran (yellow card) 36'; Smyth 78', 84' (pen.)	Report	Delap 22'; Tilt (yellow card) 34' (yellow-red card) 83'; Armer (yellow card) 51'; Krubally (yellow card) 52'; Evans (yellow card) 65'	Stadium: Meadow Lane; Attendance: 11,701 (1,138 away); Referee: Kirsty Dowle

1 September 2026 4	Doncaster Rovers	1–1	Notts County	Doncaster
19:45 BST	Hutchinson 36'; Senior (yellow card) 44'; Clifton (yellow card) 88'	Report	Lipsiuc (yellow card) 45'; Cooper 64', (yellow card) 76'; Bedeau (yellow card) 89'	Stadium: Club Doncaster Sports Village; Attendance: 11,701; Referee: Zac Kennard-Kettle

5 September 2026 5	Huddersfield Town	1–1	Notts County	Huddersfield
15:00 BST	Harness 12'; Balker (yellow card) 40'	Report	Cooper 23'; Lipsiuc (yellow card) 43'; Grant (yellow card) 82'	Stadium: Accu Stadium; Referee: Ross Martin

12 September 2026 6	Notts County	0–1	Bradford City	Nottingham
12:30 BST	Evans (yellow card) 39'; Ness (yellow card) 58'; Kanu (yellow card) 69'; Bedeau (yellow card) 77'	Report	Touray (yellow card) 11'; Sarcevic (yellow card) 14'; Pratt 52', (yellow card) 71'; Powell (yellow card) 90'	Stadium: Meadow Lane; Attendance: 12,511 (2,226 away); Referee: Alex Chilowicz
Note: Fixture was initially scheduled for a 15:00 kick-off, but was brought forward for live Sky Sports.

19 September 2026 7	Reading	2–0	Notts County	Reading
15:00 BST	Marriott 49', 72'; Lisbie (yellow card) 90+1'; Lane (yellow card) 90+5'	Report	Mustapha (yellow card) 24'	Stadium: Select Car Leasing Stadium; Attendance: 12,049 (1,475 away); Referee: Simon Mather

10 October 2026 10	Notts County	1–2	Oxford United	Nottingham
12:30 BST	McDonald (yellow card) 7'; Cooper (yellow card) 23'; Sanders (yellow card) 47'; Bedeau (yellow card) 58'; Finneran (yellow card) 70', (goal) 90+1'; Ness (yellow card) 77'		Harris 18'; Sibley (yellow card) 44'; Kioso (yellow card) 82'; Helik (yellow card) 87'; Brannagan 88'	Stadium: Meadow Lane; Attendance: 12,209; Referee: Carl Brook
Note: Fixture was initially scheduled for a 15:00 kick-off, but was brought forward for live Sky Sports broadcasting.

17 October 2026 11	Wycombe Wanderers	2–0	Notts County	High Wycombe
15:00 BST	Grimmer (yellow card) 22'; Sanders 44' (o.g.); Onyedinma 86'		Robertson (yellow card) 77'; Gibbons (yellow card) 90+4'	Stadium: Adams Park; Referee: Lewis Sandoe

20 October 2026 12	Notts County	2–0	Sheffield Wednesday	Nottingham
19:45 BST	Smyth (yellow card) 34'; Kanu 38' (pen.); Grant (yellow card) 45+2'; Lipsiuc 81'	Report	Slattery (yellow card) 15'; Lowe (red card) 50'; Heskey (yellow card) 89'	Stadium: Meadow Lane; Attendance: 12,523; Referee: Stephen Parkinson

24 October 2026 13	Notts County	1–1	Stockport County	Nottingham
15:00 BST	Robertson 11'; Tsaroulla (yellow card) 15'; Smyth (yellow card) 71'; Ness (yellow card) 80'; McDonald (yellow card) 82'	Report	Osborn (yellow card) 56'; Whatmuff (yellow card) 72'; Sidibeh 81'	Stadium: Meadow Lane; Attendance: 12,214; Referee: Darren Drysdale

31 October 2026 14	Mansfield Town	0–2	Notts County	Mansfield
15:00 GMT	Bowery (yellow card) 56'	Report	Roberts 29', (yellow card) 82'; Finneran (yellow card) 55'; Kanu 65'; Smyth (yellow card) 71'	Stadium: One Call Stadium; Attendance: 9,890; Referee: Seb Stockbridge

14 November 2026 15	Bromley	Postponed	Notts County	Bromley
15:00 GMT				Stadium: Copperjax Community Stadium
Note: Fixture was postponed due to international call-ups.

21 November 2026 16	Notts County	0–1	Stevenage	Nottingham
15:00 GMT	Robertson (yellow card) 31'; Grant (penalty missed) 84'		Earley (yellow card) 34'; Piergianni (yellow card) 37'; Magennis 86'; Sanderson (yellow card) 90+4'	Stadium: Meadow Lane; Attendance: 10,769; Referee: Neil Hair

28 November 2026 17	Milton Keynes Dons	v	Notts County	Denbigh
12:30 GMT				Stadium: Stadium MK
Note: Fixture was initially scheduled for a 15:00 kick-off, but was brought forward for live Sky Sports broadcasting.

1 December 2026 18	Notts County	v	AFC Wimbledon	Nottingham
19:45 GMT				Stadium: Meadow Lane

12 December 2026 19	Notts County	v	Plymouth Argyle	Nottingham
15:00 GMT				Stadium: Meadow Lane

15 December 2026 9	Peterborough United	v	Notts County	Peterborough
19:45 GMT				Stadium: Weston Homes Stadium
Note: Fixture was originally scheduled for 3 October, but it was postponed due to international call-ups. It was later rearranged for 15 December.

19 December 2026 20	Leyton Orient	v	Notts County	Leyton
15:00 GMT				Stadium: BetWright Stadium

26 December 2026 21	Notts County	v	Cambridge United	Nottingham
15:00 GMT				Stadium: Meadow Lane

29 December 2026 22	Wigan Athletic	v	Notts County	Wigan
19:45 GMT				Stadium: Brick Community Stadium

1 January 2027 23	Barnsley	v	Notts County	Barnsley
15:00 GMT				Stadium: Oakwell

9 January 2027 24	Notts County	v	Leyton Orient	Nottingham
15:00 GMT				Stadium: Meadow Lane

12 January 2027 8	Notts County	v	Blackpool	Nottingham
19:45 GMT				Stadium: Meadow Lane
Note: Fixture was originally scheduled for 26 September, but it was postponed due to international call-ups. It was then rearranged for 12 January.

=== FA Cup ===
Notts County were drawn away to Altrincham in the first round and to Guiseley in the second round.

Win Draw Loss Fixtures

7 November 2026 First round	Altrincham	2–2 (a.e.t.) (2–3 p)	Notts County	Altrincham
17:30 GMT	Weaver 39'; Banks 59', (yellow card) 69'	Report	Bedeau 28'; Robertson (yellow card) 34'; Gibbons (yellow card) 80'; Roberts 84'; Sanders (yellow card) 97'	Stadium: J. Davidson Stadium; Attendance: 4,419 (690 away); Referee: David Rock
	Penalties
	Barlow (penalty missed); Dennis (penalty scored); Taylor (penalty missed); Jones (penalty missed); Hinchy (penalty scored)		Sanders (penalty scored); Roberts (penalty scored); Palmer (penalty missed); Gibbons (penalty missed); Longelo (penalty scored)
Note: Fixture was selected for live British Broadcasting Corporation broadcasting.

7 December 2026 Second round	Guiseley	v	Notts County	Guiseley
19:30 GMT				Stadium: Nethermoor Park
Note: Fixture was selected for live TNT Sports and HBO Max.

=== EFL Cup ===
Notts County were drawn away to Burnley in the first round.

Win Draw Loss Fixtures

8 August 2026 First round	Burnley	1–1 (4–3 p)	Notts County	Burnley
15:00 BST	Flemming 48'	Report	Gibbons (yellow card) 24'; Roberts 42'; Lipsiuc (yellow card) 73'; Evans (yellow card) 90+2'	Stadium: Turf Moor; Attendance: 10,272; Referee: Thomas Parsons
	Penalties
	Flemming (penalty scored); Amdouni (penalty scored); Tresor (penalty scored); Hannibal (penalty missed); Walker (penalty scored)		Acquah (penalty missed); Campbell (penalty scored); Grant (penalty scored); Evans (penalty scored); Bedeau (penalty missed)

=== EFL Trophy ===
==== Group stage ====
Notts County were drawn against Burton Albion, Grimsby Town and Nottingham Forest U21 into Northern Group F.

Pos	Div	Team	Pld	W	PW	PL	L	GF	GA	GD	Pts	Qualification
1	L1	Notts County	3	3	0	0	0	10	2	+8	9	Advance to Round 2
2	ACA	Nottingham Forest U21	3	1	1	0	1	5	6	−1	5	Advance to Round 2
3	L1	Burton Albion	3	0	1	1	1	1	4	−3	3	
4	L2	Grimsby Town	3	0	0	1	2	1	5	−4	1	

Source: EFL

Win Draw Loss Fixtures

22 September 2026 Group stage	Notts County	2–1	Grimsby Town	Nottingham
19:00 BST	McDonald (yellow card) 10'; Roberts 32', (yellow card) 34'; Palmer (yellow card) 89'; Cooper 90+7'	Report	Sweeney 79', (yellow card) 90+6'	Stadium: Meadow Lane; Attendance: 2,032 (166 away); Referee: Jamie Robinson

13 October 2026 Group stage	Notts County	5–1	Nottingham Forest U21	Nottingham
19:00 BST	Smyth 11'; Bedeau 66'; Ndlovu 69'; Grant 74'; Roberts 79'		Clarke (yellow card) 23'; Sanneh 90+2'	Stadium: Meadow Lane; Attendance: 1,873; Referee: Andrew Humphries

10 November 2026 Group stage	Burton Albion	0–3	Notts County	Burton upon Trent
19:00 GMT		Report	Campbell 20'; Sanders (yellow card) 36', (goal) 75'; Smyth 71'	Stadium: Pirelli Stadium; Attendance: 1,016; Referee: Isaac Searle

== Statistics ==
=== Appearances and goals ===
As of match played 10 November 2026

Players with no appearances are not included on the list; italics indicate a loaned in player

No.	Pos	Nat	Player	Total		League One		FA Cup		EFL Cup		EFL Trophy	
No.	Pos	Nat	Player	Apps	Goals	Apps	Goals	Apps	Goals	Apps	Goals	Apps	Goals
1	GK	(England) ENG	James Belshaw	16	0	12+0	0	1+0	0	1+0	0	2+0	0
2	DF	(England) ENG	James Gibbons	14	0	9+1	0	0+1	0	1+0	0	2+0	0
3	DF	(England) ENG	Rod McDonald	7	0	5+0	0	1+0	0	0+0	0	1+0	0
4	DF	(Grenada) GRN	Jacob Bedeau	17	2	12+0	0	1+0	1	1+0	0	0+3	1
6	MF	(England) ENG	Max Sanders	8	1	1+4	0	0+1	0	0+0	0	1+1	1
7	FW	(England) ENG	Callum Roberts	16	6	6+5	2	1+0	1	1+0	1	1+2	2
8	MF	(England) ENG	Ollie Cooper	10	4	8+0	3	0+0	0	1+0	0	0+1	1
9	FW	(Sierra Leone) SLE	Daniel Kanu	11	2	6+3	2	1+0	0	0+0	0	1+0	0
10	DF	(England) ENG	Rosaire Longelo	5	0	0+2	0	0+1	0	0+0	0	2+0	0
11	MF	(Republic of Ireland) IRL	Conor Grant	15	2	5+7	1	0+0	0	0+1	0	1+1	1
12	DF	(England) ENG	Lucas Ness	16	0	12+0	0	1+0	0	1+0	0	2+0	0
14	MF	(England) ENG	Darius Lipsiuc	12	1	7+3	1	0+0	0	1+0	0	1+0	0
15	MF	(England) ENG	Jack Evans	14	0	7+3	0	0+0	0	1+0	0	2+1	0
16	MF	(Scotland) SCO	Dean Campbell	3	1	1+0	0	0+0	0	1+0	0	1+0	1
17	FW	(Afghanistan) AFG	Maziar Kouhyar	6	0	0+3	0	0+0	0	0+1	0	2+0	0
18	MF	(England) ENG	Matt Palmer	6	0	1+2	0	0+1	0	0+0	0	2+0	0
19	FW	(Australia) AUS	Luka Smyth	15	4	7+4	2	1+0	0	0+0	0	3+0	2
20	MF	(Scotland) SCO	Scott Robertson	7	1	4+2	1	1+0	0	0+0	0	0+0	0
21	GK	(England) ENG	Harry Griffiths	1	0	0+0	0	0+0	0	0+0	0	1+0	0
23	DF	(Republic of Ireland) IRL	Luke Browne	3	0	0+0	0	0+0	0	0+1	0	2+0	0
25	DF	(Cyprus) CYP	Nick Tsaroulla	14	0	11+1	0	1+0	0	1+0	0	0+0	0
26	DF	(England) ENG	Ishé Samuels-Smith	12	0	4+4	0	1+0	0	0+0	0	3+0	0
27	MF	(England) ENG	Rory Finneran	11	1	9+1	1	1+0	0	0+0	0	0+0	0
33	FW	(England) ENG	Emile Acquah	2	0	0+1	0	0+0	0	0+1	0	0+0	0
39	FW	(Zimbabwe) ZIM	Lee Ndlovu	9	1	1+4	0	0+1	0	1+0	0	1+1	1
42	MF	(Sierra Leone) SLE	Hindolo Mustapha	10	0	4+4	0	0+1	0	0+0	0	1+0	0
44	DF	(Wales) WAL	Matt Baker	3	0	0+2	0	0+0	0	0+0	0	1+0	0
50	FW	(England) ENG	George Lodge	1	0	0+0	0	0+0	0	0+0	0	0+1	0
51	MF	(England) ENG	Cameron Maltby	1	0	0+0	0	0+0	0	0+0	0	0+1	0
56	MF	(England) ENG	Darshan Lemard	1	0	0+0	0	0+0	0	0+0	0	0+1	0

== Awards ==
=== Player awards ===
==== EFL League One Goal of the Month ====
Month	Player	Opposition	Result	Ref.
October	(England) Callum Roberts	v. Mansfield Town	Nominated	
