= Rory Finneran =

Irish association football player (born 2008)

Personal information
- Full name: Rory James Finneran
- Date of birth: 29 February 2008 (age 18)
- Place of birth: Manchester, England
- Height: 1.77 m (5 ft 10 in)
- Position: Defensive midfielder

Team information
- Current team: Notts County (on loan from Newcastle United)
- Number: 27

Youth career
- 2016–2024: Blackburn Rovers
- 2024–2026: Newcastle United

Senior career*
Years	Team	Apps	(Gls)
2024	Blackburn Rovers	0	(0)
2026–	Newcastle United	0	(0)
2026–	→ Notts County (loan)	6	(1)

International career^{‡}
2022–2023	Republic of Ireland U15	13	(0)
2023–2025	Republic of Ireland U17	29	(1)
2026–	Republic of Ireland U19	3	(1)
2026–	Republic of Ireland U21	6	(0)
2026–	Republic of Ireland	1	(0)
- * Club domestic league appearances and goals as of 23:31, 15 October 2026 (UTC) ‡ National team caps and goals as of 00:03, 18 November 2026 (UTC)

Rory James Finneran (born 29 February 2008) is a footballer who plays as a defensive midfielder for EFL League One club Notts County, on loan from Premier League club Newcastle United. Born in England, he plays for the Republic of Ireland national team.

In January 2024, he became Blackburn Rovers' youngest ever player, debuting in the FA Cup third round against Cambridge United.

== Early life ==
Finneran attended St Ambrose College in Altrincham in his school years.

== Club career ==
Described as a left-footed defensive midfielder, Finneran joined the Blackburn Rovers academy at eight years old. In December 2023, Finneran was named in the match day squad for Blackburn in the EFL Championship against Bristol City, but was an unused substitute. On 6 January 2024, he made his senior debut in the FA Cup against Cambridge United. At 15 years old, ten months and eight days, he became Blackburn's youngest ever debutant. However, he was not allowed to wear a kit with the main Blackburn shirt sponsor, an electronic cigarette manufacturer, due to his young age.

In July 2024, Finneran joined Newcastle United's academy, with a tribunal required to determine the compensation fee owed to Blackburn Rovers. On 29 August 2026, Finneran joined EFL League One side Notts County on a season-long loan.

== International career ==
A Republic of Ireland youth international, he first played for the U15 team against Cyprus in 2022. He went on to play for Ireland at U16 and U17 levels, making his competitive debut in a 4–0 Euro U17 qualifying win over Armenia in October 2023. He captained Ireland for the first time in a 3–1 victory over Australia at the start of 2023. Finneran was named the Republic of Ireland's under-15 player of the year in 2023. Finneran was named in the squad for the 2025 FIFA U-17 World Cup in Qatar in November 2025.

In May 2026, he received his first call up to the senior Republic of Ireland team as a late call up for a friendly against Granada. On 16 May, Finneran made his debut, replacing Jayson Molumby from the bench in a 5–0 win over Grenada.

== Career statistics ==
=== Club ===
As of match played on 29 August 2026

Appearances and goals by club, season and competition
Club	Season	League			FA Cup		League Cup (Note: Includes EFL Cup & National League Cup)		Other		Total	
Club	Season	Division	Apps	Goals	Apps	Goals	Apps	Goals	Apps	Goals	Apps	Goals
Blackburn Rovers	2023–24	Championship	0	0	1	0	0	0	0	0	1	0
Newcastle United U21	2024–25	–					2	0	–		2	0
Newcastle United U21	2025–26	–					1	0	–		1	0
Newcastle United U21	Total		–				3	0	–		3	0
Notts County (loan)	2026–27	League One	1	0	0	0	0	0	0	0	1	0
Career total			1	0	1	0	3	0	0	0	5	0

=== International ===
As of match played on 16 May 2026

Appearances and goals by national team and year
National team	Year	Apps	Goals
Republic of Ireland
Republic of Ireland	2026	1	0
Total		1	0
