= Darius Lipsiuc =

Irish association football player (born 2005)

Personal information
- Full name: Darius Lipsiuc
- Date of birth: 16 September 2005 (age 21)
- Place of birth: Dunboyne, Republic of Ireland
- Position: Midfielder

Team information
- Current team: Notts County
- Number: 14

Youth career
- 2014–2021: St Mochta's
- 2021–2022: St Patrick's Athletic

Senior career*
Years	Team	Apps	(Gls)
2022–2024	St Patrick's Athletic	1	(0)
2024–2026	Stoke City	0	(0)
2025	→ Walsall (loan)	0	(0)
2025–2026	→ Solihull Moors (loan)	33	(8)
2026–	Notts County	10	(1)

International career^{‡}
2021–2022	Republic of Ireland U17	6	(1)
2022	Republic of Ireland U18	2	(0)
2023	Republic of Ireland U19	5	(1)
2024–2026	Republic of Ireland U21	14	(0)
- * Club domestic league appearances and goals as of 22:18, 13 November 2026 (UTC) ‡ National team caps and goals as of 00:03, 18 November 2026 (UTC)

Darius Lipsiuc (born 16 September 2005) is an Irish professional footballer who plays as a midfielder for EFL League One club Notts County.

== Club career ==
=== St Patrick's Athletic ===
Dunboyne, County Meath man Lipsiuc joined the academy of League of Ireland Premier Division club St Patrick's Athletic in the summer of 2021, having previously played for his local club St Mochta's in Clonsilla, where he had played since the age of 9. He made his professional debut on 27 September 2022 in a Dublin derby away to Shamrock Rovers at Tallaght Stadium, replacing Serge Atakayi from the bench in the 78th minute.

=== Stoke City ===
On 26 January 2024, Lipsiuc signed a two-and-a-half-year contract with EFL Championship club Stoke City for an undisclosed fee. He made his senior debut for the club on 17 September 2024 in a EFL Cup win at home to Fleetwood Town. On 3 February 2025, Lipsuic joined League Two leaders Walsall on a loan until the end of the 2024–25 season. In July 2025, Lipsiuc joined National League side Solihull Moors on a six-month loan. In January 2026, his loan was extended until the end of the 2025–26 season.

=== Notts County ===
On 27 June 2026, Lipsiuc joined EFL League One club Notts County on a three-year contract for an undisclosed fee.

== International career ==
Lipsiuc has represented the Republic of Ireland at U17, U18 and U19 level. In November 2024, he received his first call up to the Republic of Ireland U21 squad for their two friendlies against Sweden U21 in Marbella, Spain. He made his debut in a 2–0 defeat to Sweden on 14 November 2024.

== Career statistics ==
As of match played 31 October 2026

Appearances and goals by club, season and competition
Club	Season	League			National cup (Note: Includes FAI Cup & FA Cup)		League cup (Note: Includes EFL Cup & National League Cup)		Other		Total	
Club	Season	Division	Apps	Goals	Apps	Goals	Apps	Goals	Apps	Goals	Apps	Goals
St Patrick's Athletic	2022	LOI Premier Division	1	0	0	0	—		0 (Note: Appearance in the President of Ireland's Cup)	0	1	0
St Patrick's Athletic	2023	LOI Premier Division	0	0	0	0	—		1 (Note: Appearance(s) in the Leinster Senior Cup)	0	1	0
St Patrick's Athletic	2024	LOI Premier Division	—		—		—		0	0	0	0
St Patrick's Athletic	Total		1	0	0	0	—		1	0	2	0
Stoke City	2024–25	Championship	0	0	0	0	1	0	—		1	0
Stoke City	2025–26	Championship	0	0	—		—		—		0	0
Stoke City	Total		0	0	0	0	1	0	—		1	0
Walsall (loan)	2024–25	League Two	0	0	—		—		0	0	0	0
Solihull Moors (loan)	2025–26	National League	33	8	0	0	4	1	1 (Note: Appearance in the FA Trophy)	1	38	10
Notts County	2026–27	League One	10	1	0	0	1	0	1 (Note: Appearance in the EFL Trophy)	0	12	1
Career total			44	9	0	0	6	1	3	1	53	11
