= Emile Acquah =

English footballer (born 2000)

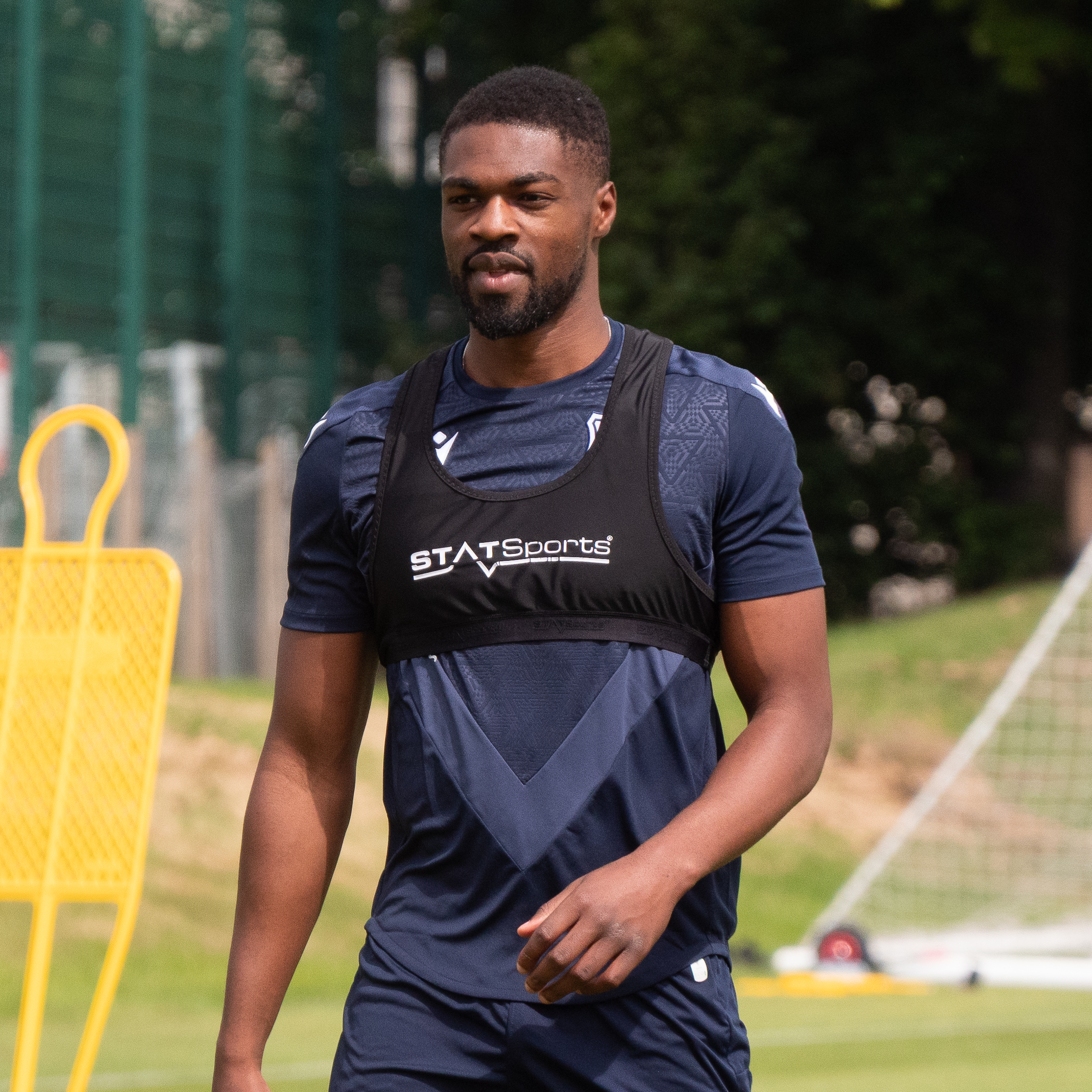
- Emile Acquah during a Dundee training session in 2025

Personal information
- Full name: Emile Matthew Yaw Nyamedom Acquah
- Date of birth: 13 July 2000 (age 26)
- Place of birth: Hackney, England
- Height: 6 ft 3 in (1.91 m)
- Position: Striker

Team information
- Current team: Notts County
- Number: 33

Youth career
- –2018: Southend United

Senior career*
Years	Team	Apps	(Gls)
2018–2021	Southend United	41	(3)
2018–2019	→ Harlow Town (loan)	27	(8)
2020	→ Maidenhead United (loan)	0	(0)
2020	→ Maidenhead United (loan)	1	(0)
2021–2023	Maidenhead United	76	(15)
2023–2025	Barrow	82	(14)
2025–2026	Dundee	13	(0)
2026	→ Harrogate Town (loan)	20	(0)
2026–	Notts County	1	(0)

International career^{‡}
2023	England C	1	(0)
- * Club domestic league appearances and goals as of 19:28, 24 August 2026 (UTC) ‡ National team caps and goals as of 21:54, 21 March 2023 (UTC)

Emile Matthew Yaw Nyamedom Acquah (born 13 July 2000) is an English professional footballer who plays as a striker for Notts County.

== Career ==
In August 2018, after progressing through Southend United's academy, Acquah was loaned out to Isthmian Premier Division club Harlow Town. During his time at Harlow, Acquah scored eight goals in 28 league games. In March 2019, following scoring in his last game for Harlow in a 7–2 defeat against Wingate & Finchley, Acquah returned to Southend. Upon his return to Southend, Acquah made three EFL League One appearances in the remainder of the season. He scored his first senior goal for the Shrimpers in a 1–3 defeat at home to Ipswich Town on 26 October 2019. Acquah joined Maidenhead United on loan on 28 January 2020, but was recalled without playing a game for the Magpies to cover for injuries. Acquah re-joined Maidenhead on loan on 13 March 2020. He was released by Southend at the end of the 2020–21 season, before re-joining Maidenhead permanently. Acquah found form in his second full season at York Road, scoring 13 goals in the National League before a debut for England C on 21 March 2023. He won the players' player of the year award for the 2022–23 season and was also top scorer.

Acquah joined Barrow on 11 July 2023 for an undisclosed fee.

On 23 June 2025, Acquah joined Scottish Premiership club Dundee on a three-year deal for an undisclosed fee. Acquah scored his first goal for the Dee on 22 July 2025 in an away League Cup win against Bonnyrigg Rose. On 13 January 2026, Acquah joined EFL League Two club Harrogate Town on loan until the end of the season.

On 8 July 2026, Acquah joined Notts County on a two-year contract for an undisclosed fee.

== Personal life ==
Born in England, Acquah is of Ghanaian descent. He attended Southend High School for Boys.

== Career statistics ==
As of 15 August 2026

Appearances and goals by club, season and competition
Club	Season	League			National cup (Note: Includes FA Cup, Scottish Cup)		League cup (Note: Includes EFL Cup, Scottish League Cup)		Other		Total	
Club	Season	Division	Apps	Goals	Apps	Goals	Apps	Goals	Apps	Goals	Apps	Goals
Southend United	2018–19	League One	3	0	0	0	0	0	0	0	3	0
Southend United	2019–20	League One	7	1	1	0	0	0	3 (Note: Appearances in the EFL Trophy)	0	11	1
Southend United	2020–21	League Two	31	2	1	0	0	0	2	0	34	2
Southend United	Total		41	3	2	0	0	0	5	0	48	3
Harlow Town (loan)	2018–19	Isthmian League Premier Division	27	8	0	0	0	0	3 (Note: Two appearances and one goal in the FA Trophy, one appearance in the Alan Turvey Trophy)	1	30	9
Maidenhead United (loan)	2019–20	National League	1	0	0	0	0	0	0	0	1	0
Maidenhead United	2021–22	National League	31	2	1	2	0	0	0	0	32	4
Maidenhead United	2022–23	National League	45	13	2	0	0	0	2 (Note: Appearances in the FA Trophy)	0	49	13
Maidenhead United	Total		76	15	3	2	0	0	2	0	81	17
Barrow	2023–24	League Two	44	8	2	1	1	0	0	0	47	9
Barrow	2024–25	League Two	38	6	0	0	3	1	1	0	42	7
Barrow	Total		82	14	2	1	4	1	1	0	89	16
Dundee	2025–26	Scottish Premiership	13	0	0	0	4	1	0	0	17	1
Harrogate Town	2025–26	League Two	20	0	0	0	0	0	0	0	20	0
Notts County	2026–27	League One	1	0	0	0	1	0	0	0	2	0
Career total			261	40	7	3	9	2	12	1	289	46
