= Jack Evans (footballer, born 2000) =

English footballer (born 2000)

Personal information
- Full name: Jack Lucas James Evans
- Date of birth: 10 August 2000 (age 26)
- Place of birth: Warrington, England
- Height: 1.73 m (5 ft 8 in)
- Position: Midfielder

Team information
- Current team: Notts County
- Number: 15

Youth career
- 2006–2019: Blackburn Rovers

Senior career*
| Years | Team | Apps | (Gls) |
| 2019–2020 | Blackburn Rovers | 0 | (0) |
| 2019 | → Lancaster City (loan) | 3 | (0) |
| 2020–2022 | Forest Green Rovers | 2 | (0) |
| 2020–2021 | → Hungerford Town (loan) | 2 | (1) |
| 2021 | → Gloucester City (loan) | 0 | (0) |
| 2022 | → AFC Fylde (loan) | 7 | (0) |
| 2022–2023 | Hereford | 28 | (3) |
| 2023–2025 | FC Halifax Town | 65 | (1) |
| 2025–2026 | Harrogate Town | 43 | (2) |
| 2026– | Notts County | 10 | (0) |
- * Club domestic league appearances and goals as of 11:20, 25 October 2026 (UTC)

Jack Lucas James Evans (born 10 August 2000) is an English professional footballer who plays as a midfielder for EFL League One club Notts County.

== Career ==
Born in Warrington, Evans began his career with Blackburn Rovers at the age of six and turning professional in 2018, moving on loan to Lancaster City in December 2019.

He transferred to Forest Green Rovers in July 2020. He made his senior professional debut on 8 September 2020, in a EFL Trophy match. On 1 December 2020, Evans joined National League South side Hungerford Town on a one-month loan. On 8 February 2021, Evans joined National League North side Gloucester City on a one-month loan deal. On 13 January 2022, Evans joined National League North side AFC Fylde on loan for the remainder of the 2021–22 season. At the end of the 2021–22 season, Evans was one of seven players released by Forest Green.

On 29 July 2022, Evans signed for National League North club Hereford. He suffered a serious training injury in February 2023.

On 3 August 2023, Evans signed for National League club FC Halifax Town. He scored on his debut in the opening league fixture of the season. He departed the club at the end of the 2024–25 season.

On 28 May 2025, Evans joined League Two side Harrogate Town.

On 24 July 2026 Evans signed for Notts County.

== Career statistics ==
As of match played 24 October 2026

Appearances and goals by club, season and competition
| Club | Season | League | | | FA Cup | | League Cup | | Other | | Total | |
| Club | Season | Division | Apps | Goals | Apps | Goals | Apps | Goals | Apps | Goals | Apps | Goals |
|---|---|---|---|---|---|---|---|---|---|---|---|---|
| Blackburn Rovers | 2019–20 | Championship | 0 | 0 | 0 | 0 | 0 | 0 | 0 | 0 | 0 | 0 |
| Lancaster City (loan) | 2019–20 | NPL Premier Division | 3 | 0 | 0 | 0 | — | | 1 (Note: Appearance(s) in Lancashire FA Challenge Trophy) | 0 | 4 | 0 |
| Forest Green Rovers | 2020–21 | League Two | 2 | 0 | 0 | 0 | 0 | 0 | 3 (Note: Appearance(s) in EFL Trophy) | 0 | 5 | 0 |
| Forest Green Rovers | 2021–22 | League Two | 0 | 0 | 0 | 0 | 0 | 0 | 4 | 0 | 4 | 0 |
| Forest Green Rovers | Total | | 2 | 0 | 0 | 0 | 0 | 0 | 7 | 0 | 9 | 0 |
| Hungerford Town (loan) | 2020–21 | National League South | 2 | 1 | 0 | 0 | — | | 1 (Note: Appearance(s) in FA Trophy) | 0 | 3 | 1 |
| Gloucester City (loan) | 2020–21 | National League North | 0 | 0 | 0 | 0 | — | | 0 | 0 | 0 | 0 |
| AFC Fylde (loan) | 2021–22 | National League North | 7 | 0 | 0 | 0 | — | | 0 | 0 | 7 | 0 |
| Hereford | 2022–23 | National League North | 28 | 3 | 2 | 0 | — | | 0 | 0 | 30 | 3 |
| FC Halifax Town | 2023–24 | National League | 29 | 1 | 1 | 0 | — | | 1 (Note: Appearance in National League play-offs) | 1 | 31 | 2 |
| FC Halifax Town | 2024–25 | National League | 36 | 0 | 1 | 0 | — | | 3 (Note: Two appearances in National League Cup, one appearance in FA Trophy) | 0 | 40 | 0 |
| FC Halifax Town | Total | | 65 | 1 | 2 | 0 | 0 | 0 | 4 | 1 | 71 | 2 |
| Harrogate Town | 2025–26 | League Two | 43 | 2 | 1 | 0 | 1 | 0 | 3 | 0 | 48 | 2 |
| Notts County | 2026–27 | League One | 10 | 0 | 0 | 0 | 1 | 0 | 2 | 0 | 13 | 0 |
| Career Total | | | 160 | 7 | 5 | 0 | 2 | 0 | 18 | 1 | 187 | 8 |
