= Luka Smyth =

Australian footballer (born 2004)

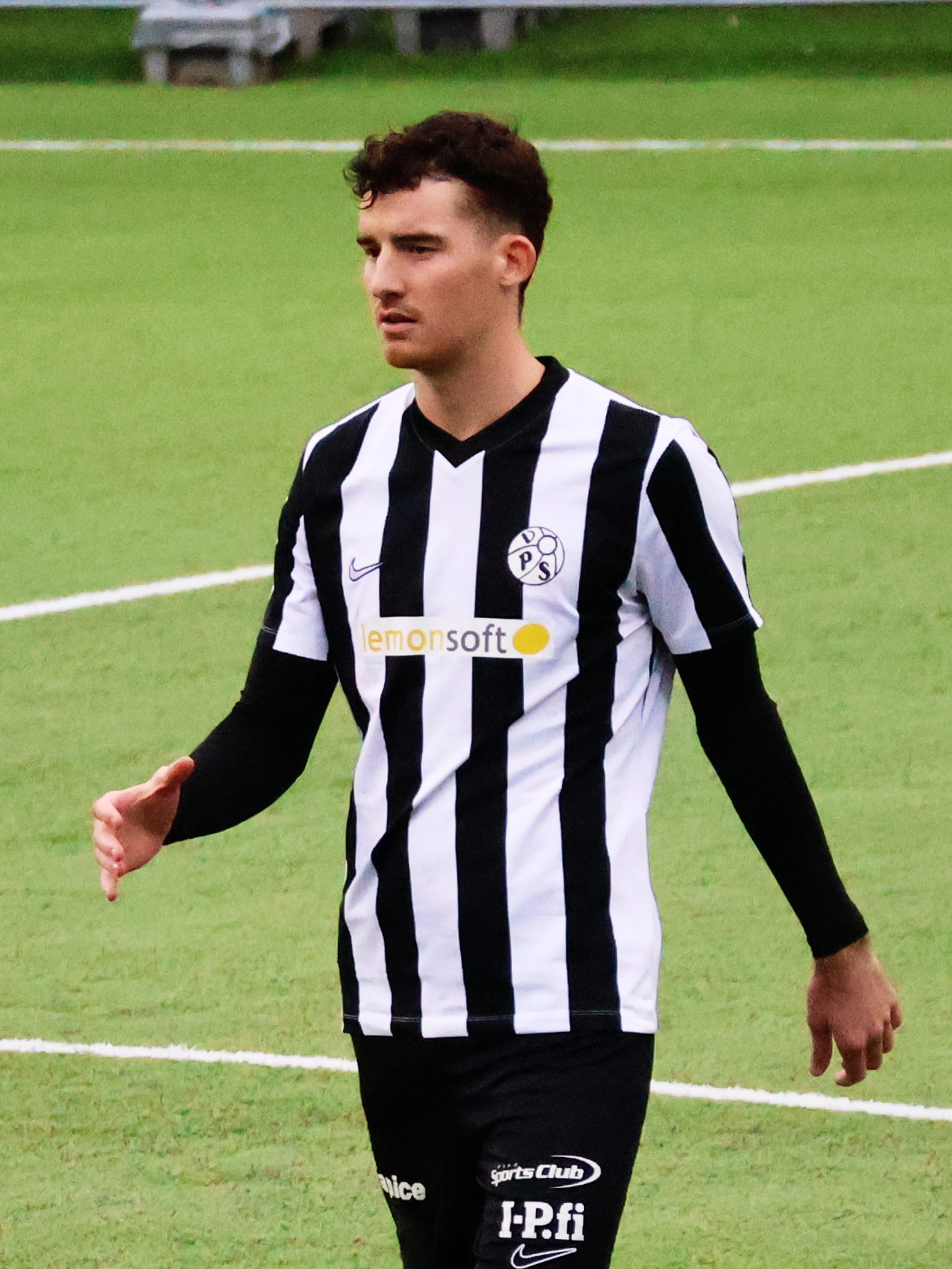
- Smyth with VPS II in 2025

Personal information
- Full name: Luka Benjamin Smyth
- Date of birth: 25 February 2004 (age 22)
- Place of birth: Australia
- Height: 1.92 m (6 ft 4 in)
- Position: Centre forward

Team information
- Current team: Notts County
- Number: 19

Youth career
- Sydney FC
- Central Coast Mariners

Senior career*
| Years | Team | Apps | (Gls) |
| 2022–2023 | Sydney FC II | 25 | (5) |
| 2023–2024 | Central Coast Mariners II | 25 | (10) |
| 2024–2025 | VPS II | 8 | (16) |
| 2024–2026 | VPS | 21 | (7) |
| 2026– | Notts County | 3 | (2) |
- * Club domestic league appearances and goals as of 27 July 2026

Luka Benjamin Smyth (born 25 February 2004) is an Australian professional soccer player who plays as a centre forward for EFL League One club Notts County.

== Club career ==
On 9 October 2024, his deal with VPS was extended until the end of 2026.

On 27 July 2026, Smyth joined newly promoted EFL League One club Notts County on an initial three-year deal for €150,000 transfer fee.

== Career statistics ==
As of 30 August 2026

Appearances and goals by club, season and competition
| Club | Season | League | | | National cup (Note: Includes Australia Cup and Suomen Cup) | | League cup (Note: Includes Finnish League Cup) | | Total | |
| Club | Season | Division | Apps | Goals | Apps | Goals | Apps | Goals | Apps | Goals |
|---|---|---|---|---|---|---|---|---|---|---|
| Sydney FC II | 2022 | NPL NSW | 11 | 2 | 2 | 0 | – | | 13 | 2 |
| Sydney FC II | 2023 | NPL NSW | 14 | 3 | – | | – | | 14 | 3 |
| Sydney FC II | Total | | 25 | 5 | 2 | 0 | 0 | 0 | 27 | 5 |
| Central Coast Mariners | 2023–24 | A-League Men | 0 | 0 | 0 | 0 | – | | 0 | 0 |
| Central Coast Mariners II | 2023 | NPL NSW | 2 | 0 | – | | – | | 2 | 0 |
| Central Coast Mariners II | 2024 | NPL NSW | 23 | 10 | – | | – | | 23 | 10 |
| Central Coast Mariners II | Total | | 25 | 10 | 0 | 0 | 0 | 0 | 25 | 10 |
| VPS Akatemia | 2024 | Kolmonen | 4 | 11 | – | | – | | 4 | 11 |
| VPS Akatemia | 2025 | Kakkonen | 4 | 5 | – | | – | | 4 | 5 |
| VPS Akatemia | Total | | 8 | 16 | 0 | 0 | 0 | 0 | 8 | 16 |
| VPS | 2024 | Veikkausliiga | 6 | 0 | 0 | 0 | 0 | 0 | 6 | 0 |
| VPS | 2025 | Veikkausliiga | 1 | 0 | 1 | 1 | 2 | 1 | 4 | 2 |
| VPS | 2026 | Veikkausliiga | 14 | 7 | 5 | 5 | 3 | 0 | 22 | 12 |
| VPS | Total | | 21 | 7 | 6 | 6 | 5 | 1 | 32 | 14 |
| Notts County | 2026–27 | League One | 3 | 2 | 0 | 0 | 0 | 0 | 3 | 2 |
| Career total | | | 79 | 38 | 8 | 6 | 5 | 1 | 92 | 45 |
