= Rosaire Longelo =

English footballer (born 1999)

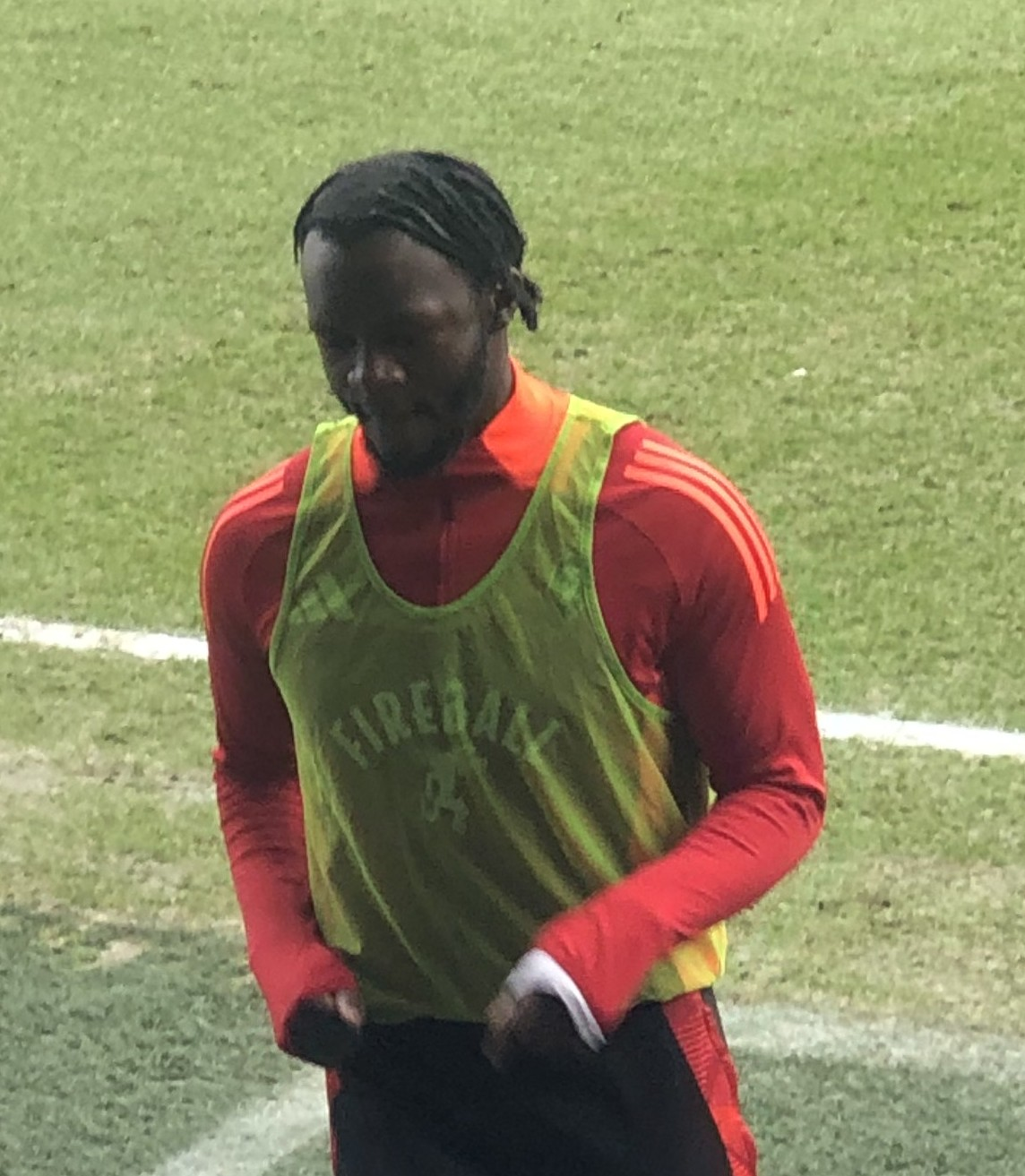
- Longelo in 2025.

Personal information
- Full name: Rosaire Longelo-Mbule
- Date of birth: 20 October 1999 (age 27)
- Place of birth: Kinshasa, DR Congo
- Height: 6 ft 0 in (1.83 m)
- Position: Left back

Team information
- Current team: Notts County
- Number: 10

Youth career
- West Ham United
- 2018–2022: Newcastle United

Senior career*
Years	Team	Apps	(Gls)
2022–2024	Accrington Stanley	68	(5)
2024–2025	Swindon Town	16	(1)
2025–2026	Salford City	54	(1)
2026–	Notts County	2	(0)
- * Club domestic league appearances and goals as of 15:36, 8 November 2026 (UTC)

Rosaire Longelo-Mbule (born 20 October 1999) is an English professional footballer who plays as a left back for EFL League One club Notts County.

== Career ==
After playing for West Ham United and Newcastle United, Longelo signed with Accrington Stanley in January 2022. He was offered a new contract at the end of the 2023–24 season.

On 12 June 2024, Longelo signed for Swindon Town from 1 July 2024.

In January 2025 he signed for Salford City.

He moved to Notts County on 1 September 2026.

== Personal life ==
Longelo was born in Kinshasa in the Democratic Republic of the Congo, before moving to England as a child. Longelo played alongside his brother, Emmanuel, in West Ham's academy.

== Playing style ==
Originally a forward, Longelo converted to a left back.

== Career statistics ==
As of match played 7 November 2026

Appearances and goals by club, season and competition
Club	Season	League			FA Cup		EFL Cup		Other		Total	
Club	Season	Division	Apps	Goals	Apps	Goals	Apps	Goals	Apps	Goals	Apps	Goals
Newcastle United U23	2018–19	—			—		—		3 (Note: Appearance(s) in EFL Trophy)	0	3	0
Newcastle United U23	2019–20	—			—		—		2	0	2	0
Newcastle United U23	2020–21	—			—		—		3	0	3	0
Newcastle United U23	2021–22	—			—		—		1	0	1	0
Accrington Stanley	2021–22	League One	12	1	0	0	0	0	0	0	12	1
Accrington Stanley	2022–23	League One	34	2	5	0	1	0	3	0	43	2
Accrington Stanley	2023–24	League Two	22	2	2	0	1	0	2	1	27	3
Accrington Stanley	Total		68	5	7	0	2	0	5	1	82	6
Swindon Town	2024–25	League Two	16	1	1	0	1	0	3	0	21	1
Salford City	2024–25	League Two	16	0	0	0	0	0	0	0	16	0
Salford City	2025–26	League Two	38	1	4	0	1	0	4	0	47	1
Salford City	Total		54	1	4	0	1	0	4	0	63	1
Notts County	2026–27	League One	2	0	1	0	0	0	2	0	5	0
Career total			140	7	13	0	4	0	23	1	180	8
