= Hindolo Mustapha =

Sierra Leonean footballer (born 2006)

Personal information
- Full name: Hindolo Thomas Eric Mustapha
- Date of birth: 29 July 2006 (age 20)
- Place of birth: Lambeth, England
- Height: 1.87 m (6 ft 2 in)
- Positions: Attacking midfielder; forward

Team information
- Current team: Notts County (on loan from Crystal Palace)
- Number: 42

Youth career
- 2015–2024: Crystal Palace

Senior career*
Years	Team	Apps	(Gls)
2024–	Crystal Palace	0	(0)
2025–2026	→ 1. FC Nürnberg (loan)	0	(0)
2026	→ West Bromwich Albion (loan)	1	(0)
2026	→ Wigan Athletic (loan)	0	(0)
2026–	→ Notts County (loan)	7	(0)

International career^{‡}
2024–	Sierra Leone	3	(1)
- * Club domestic league appearances and goals as of 19 September 2026 ‡ National team caps and goals as of 11 October 2024

Hindolo Thomas Eric Mustapha (born 29 July 2006) is a footballer who plays as an attacking midfielder or forward for EFL League One club Notts County, on loan from Premier League club Crystal Palace. Born in England, he represents Sierra Leone internationally.

== Club career ==
=== Crystal Palace ===
Mustapha joined the youth academy of English Premier League club Crystal Palace at under-9 age level. He signed his first professional contract with the club in January 2024.

==== 2025–26: 1. FC Nürnberg (loan) ====
On 26 August 2025, Mustapha signed a new contract and was then loaned out to 2. Bundesliga side 1. FC Nürnberg. In October 2025, he was criticised by manager Miroslav Klose for his professionalism and attitude, encouraging him to work to become part of the first team. However, in January 2026, Mustapha returned from his loan having not made a first team appearance for the German club.

==== 2026: West Bromwich Albion (loan) ====
On 2 February 2026, he joined West Bromwich Albion on loan for the rest of the 2025–26 season.

==== 2026: Wigan Athletic (loan) ====
On 4 July 2026, Mustapha joined Wigan Athletic on a season-long loan deal.

==== 2026–27: Notts County (loan) ====
However, on 11 August 2026, his loan deal at Wigan was terminated before the season even began and he subsequently joined Notts County on another loan deal until the end of the season.

== International career ==
Mustapha is a Sierra Leone international and won three caps during September and October 2024, in the qualification rounds for the 2025 Africa Cup of Nations.

== Style of play ==
Mustapha has mainly played as an attacking midfielder throughout his career, but can operate as a wide forward depending on a team's formation. African news website Foot Africa wrote in 2025 that he "has been a constant influence, dictating the tempo and surging forward when needed. His playing style is winning admirers, as is his maturity on the pitch" while playing for the club.

== Career statistics ==
=== Club ===
As of match played 19 September 2026

Appearances and goals by club, season and competition
Club	Season	League			National Cup		League cup		Europe		Other		Total	
Club	Season	Division	Apps	Goals	Apps	Goals	Apps	Goals	Apps	Goals	Apps	Goals	Apps	Goals
Crystal Palace	2024–25	Premier League	0	0	0	0	0	0	—		2 (Note: Appearances in EFL Trophy)	1	2	1
Crystal Palace	2025–26	Premier League	0	0	0	0	0	0	—		0	0	0	0
Crystal Palace	2026–27	Premier League	0	0	0	0	0	0	0	0	0	0	0	0
Crystal Palace	Total		0	0	0	0	0	0	0	0	2	1	2	1
1. FC Nürnberg (loan)	2025–26	2. Bundesliga	0	0	0	0	—		—		0	0	0	0
West Bromwich Albion (loan)	2025–26	EFL Championship	1	0	1	0	—		—		0	0	2	0
Wigan Athletic (loan)	2026–27	League One	0	0	0	0	—		—		—		0	0
Notts County (loan)	2026–27	League One	7	0	0	0	—		—		—		7	0
Career total			8	0	1	0	0	0	0	0	2	1	11	1

=== International ===
As of match played 11 October 2024

Appearances and goals by national team and year
National team	Year	Apps	Goals
Sierra Leone	2024	3	1
Total		3	1

As of match played 9 October 2024
Sierra Leone score listed first, score column indicates score after each Mustapha goal.

List of international goals scored by Hindolo Mustapha
No.	Date	Venue	Cap	Opponent	Score	Result	Competition	Ref.
1	10 September 2024	Levy Mwanawasa Stadium, Ndola, Zambia	2	Zambia	2–2	2–3	2025 Africa Cup of Nations qualification	
