= Notts County F.C. =

Association football club in Nottingham, England

Notts County
- Full name: Notts County Football Club
- Nickname: The Magpies
- Short name: Notts
- Founded: 1862 (informal); 25 November 1862; 164 years ago (specific date disputed) (Note: While the formal organisation of Notts County occurred on 7 December 1864, the club's traditional foundation date is 1862, and "there is some evidence, in the shape of informal matches, to support this claim." A newspaper report from the Nottingham Guardian on 28 November 1862 is sometimes linked with the formation of Notts County. The report (as given in the Notts County histories) reads "The opening of the Nottingham Football Club commenced on Tuesday last [25 November 1862] at Cremorne Gardens. A side was chosen by W. Arkwright and Chas Deakin. A very spirited game resulted in the latter scoring two goals and two rouges against one and one." However, the connection of the club mentioned in this report to Notts County is disputed. Notts County's own official history says "we don't know if this game was organised by the forerunners of the Notts club." Foss, who otherwise argues that there is "enough information that the club [can] confidently declare 1862 as its year of formation", points out that the report actually refers to a Milton Football Club from Sheffield. Foss suggests that the mistake may have arisen in an earlier edition of that day's Nottingham Guardian and was corrected later.); 7 December 1864; 161 years ago (formal)
- Ground: Meadow Lane
- Capacity: 19,841
- Coordinates: 52°56′33″N 1°8′14″W
- Owner(s): Alexander and Christoffer Reedtz
- Chairman: Christoffer Reedtz
- Head coach: Martin Paterson
- League: EFL League One
- 2025–26: EFL League Two, 5th of 24 (promoted via play-offs)
- Website: nottscountyfc.co.uk
Home colours	Away colours

Notts County Football Club is a professional football club in Nottingham, England, which competes in EFL League One. Founded in 1862, Notts County is the oldest professional football club in the world. They first competed in the FA Cup in 1877 and in 1888 became one of the 12 founding members of the Football League. The club has been promoted 15 times and relegated 17 times, and has competed in each of the top five divisions of English football.

Notts County won the FA Cup in 1894. The club's highest league finishes were third in the top division in 1890–91 and 1900–01. In 1947, they signed England international Tommy Lawton, whose presence attracted large crowds, but the club fell into decline after his departure and were in the Fourth Division by the 1960s. Under Jimmy Sirrel's management, the club won three promotions in the 1970s and 1980s, to reach the First Division again in 1981. Notts County's most recent season in the top flight was 1991–92 under Neil Warnock, who had overseen back-to-back promotions via the play-offs at Wembley Stadium. By the early part of the 21st century the club was affected by a series of serious off-field problems, culminating in relegation to non-League football in 2019. It spent four years as a non-League club before returning to the Football League in 2023.

The team have played their home games at Meadow Lane since 1910, having earlier played at a number of venues including Trent Bridge. The team colours of black and white were first adopted in 1890, inspiring their nickname of the "Magpies", and at the end of 1901, Notts lent their colours to Juventus. Notts County first played its neighbour Nottingham Forest in 1866, making the Nottingham derby one of football's oldest fixtures. The club's record appearance holder is goalkeeper Albert Iremonger, who played 601 games in a 22-year spell with the team, and its record goalscorer is Les Bradd with 137 goals.

== History ==
=== Formation to World War I ===
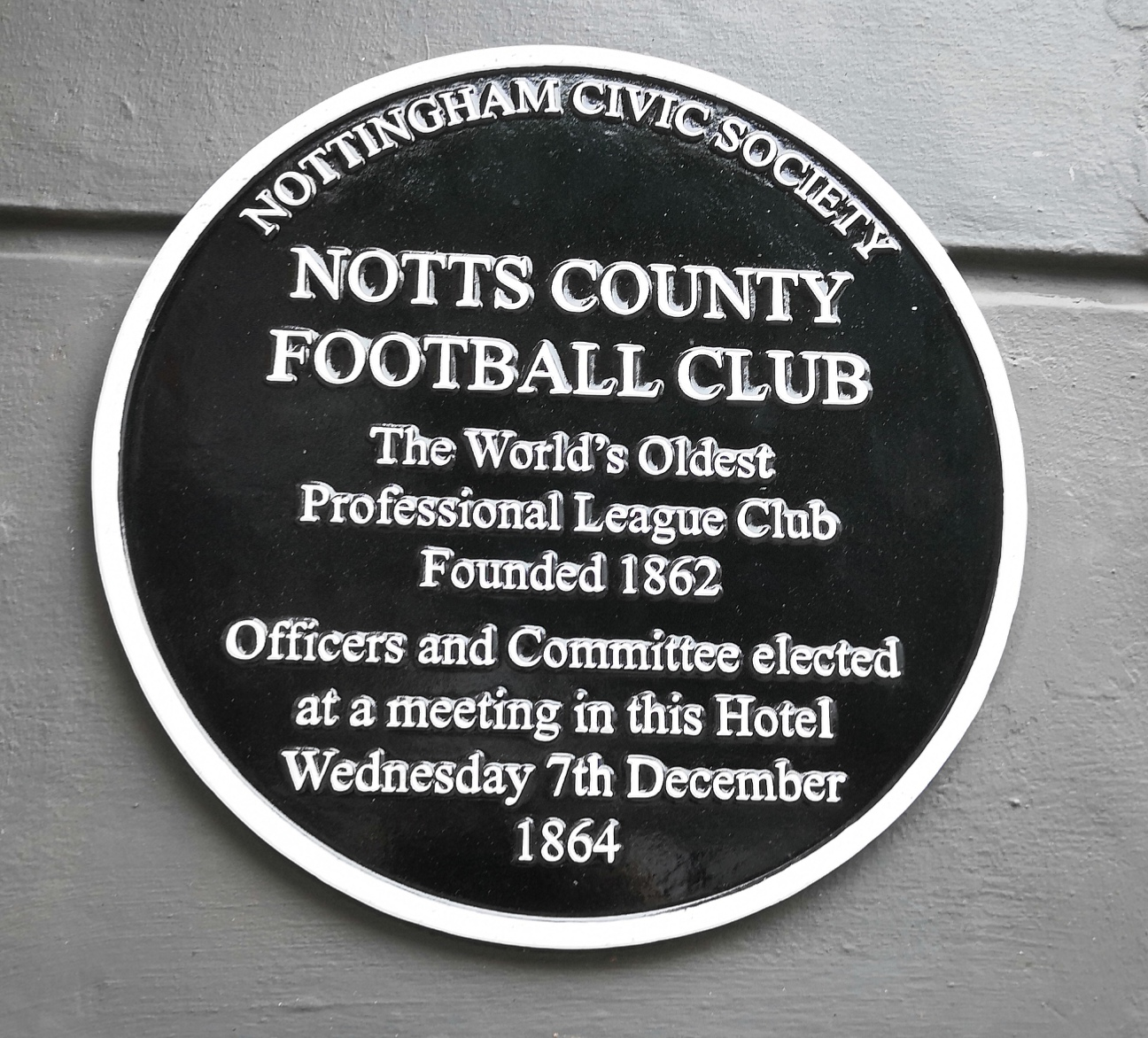
Plaque at the George Hotel, Nottingham, commemorating the formal establishment of Notts County

Although formally organised on 7 December 1864, (Note: A meeting was held on that date at the George Hotel, Nottingham, where a president, treasurer and committee were elected, and a subscription fee collected.) Notts County's traditional foundation date is 1862, making it the oldest professional football club in the world. From about this time, the founding members had met in The Park, Nottingham, to practice football amongst themselves, and these informal gatherings came to be regarded as the club's beginning. Notts played their first recorded match on 8 December 1864 at Nottingham's Meadows Cricket Ground, against a team known as Trent Valley. On 2 January 1865, Notts were beaten 1–0 by Sheffield at the Meadows, the latter's first match against an opponent from outside of Sheffield. The club's early members were overwhelmingly from middle class backgrounds, including bankers, solicitors and men involved in Nottingham's lacemaking industry. Notts are thought to have mostly played under Sheffield Rules in their early days, though certain matches are recorded as being played according to "Nottingham Rules".

In 1872, Harwood Greenhalgh played for England in the first international match against Scotland, so becoming Notts County's first international representative. The club entered the FA Cup for the first time in the 1877–78 season, and the team reached semi-finals in 1883 (losing to Old Etonians) and 1884 (losing to Blackburn Rovers). It was during this period that Harry Cursham played for Notts; his 49 FA Cup goals remains the competition record. The Football Association legalised professionalism in 1885, and Notts immediately recognised six of its players as professionals. In 1888, the club had just experienced what Mark Metcalf described as their worst ever season, but nevertheless Notts County became one of the 12 founding members of the Football League. Notts finished 11th in the competition's inaugural year and were obliged to apply for re-election to the League for the following season; the club received seven votes, the fewest of the four League clubs required to reapply for their place, but nonetheless were re-elected.

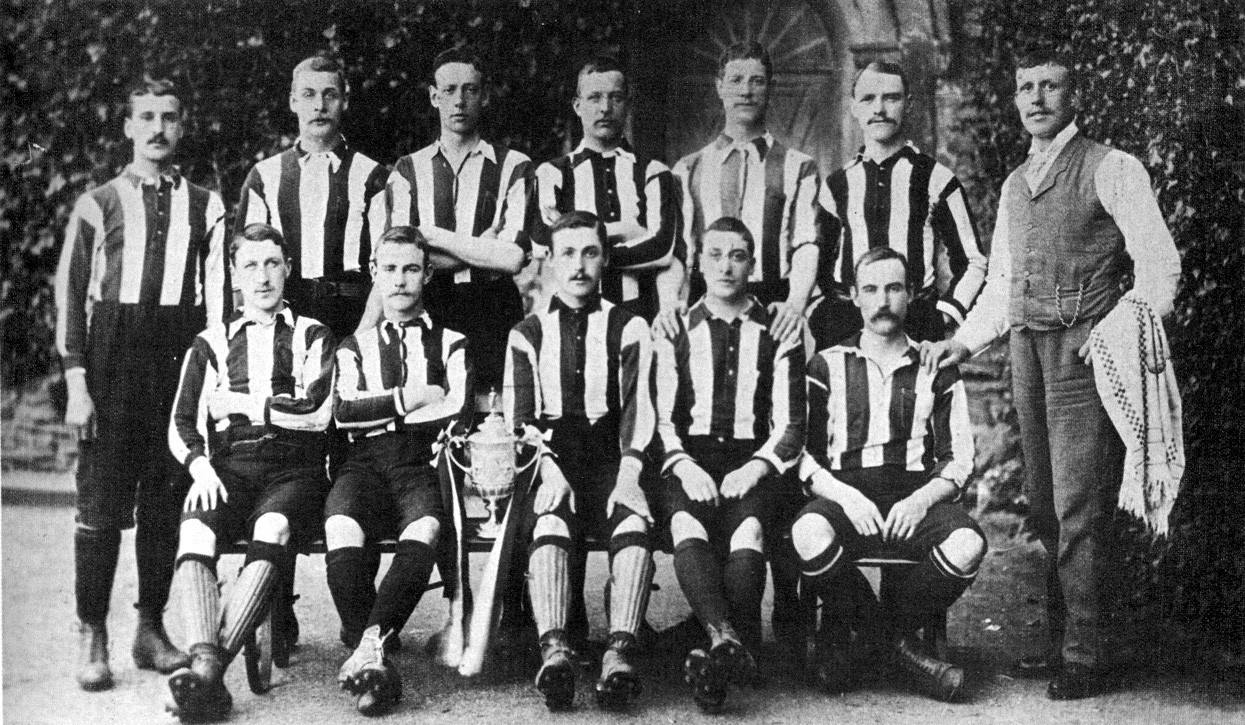
In 1894, Notts County won the FA Cup for the only time in their history.

In 1891, Notts County reached the FA Cup final for the first time. The week before the final, Notts defeated their opponents Blackburn 7–1 in a league match, a result that left the former as a strong favourite to win the Cup. However, Blackburn won the final 3–1 at Kennington Oval. The Magpies were relegated for the first time in 1893, but in 1894 became the first Second Division team to win the FA Cup. The team defeated Bolton Wanderers 4–1 in the final at Goodison Park, Liverpool, with Jimmy Logan scoring a hat-trick, one of three men to score three goals in an FA Cup final. Notts won the Second Division championship in the 1896–97 season, and won promotion to the First Division following a series of "test matches". The Magpies spent 18 of the next 19 seasons in the first tier; in 1913–14, their only season outside of the First Division, the team won the Second Division title.

=== Inter-war years, Lawton era and decline ===
League football was suspended for most of World War I. Upon its resumption in 1919–20, Notts were relegated to the Second Division. In 1921–22, while still a Second Division club, the Magpies reached the FA Cup semi-final, losing 3–1 to Huddersfield Town at Turf Moor, Burnley. In 1922–23, Notts won the Second Division championship and promotion back to the First Division, where they remained for three seasons. The team conceded only 31 goals and were in contention for the league championship for much of the 1924–25 season, but they were relegated the following year; Keith Warsop speculates that a change to the offside law was the reason for Notts County's swift decline. The Magpies were relegated to the third tier for the first time in 1930, but they immediately won promotion back to the Second Division as champions of the Third Division South. It was during 1930–31 that Tom Keetley scored 39 league goals for Notts, a club record which stood for 92 years.

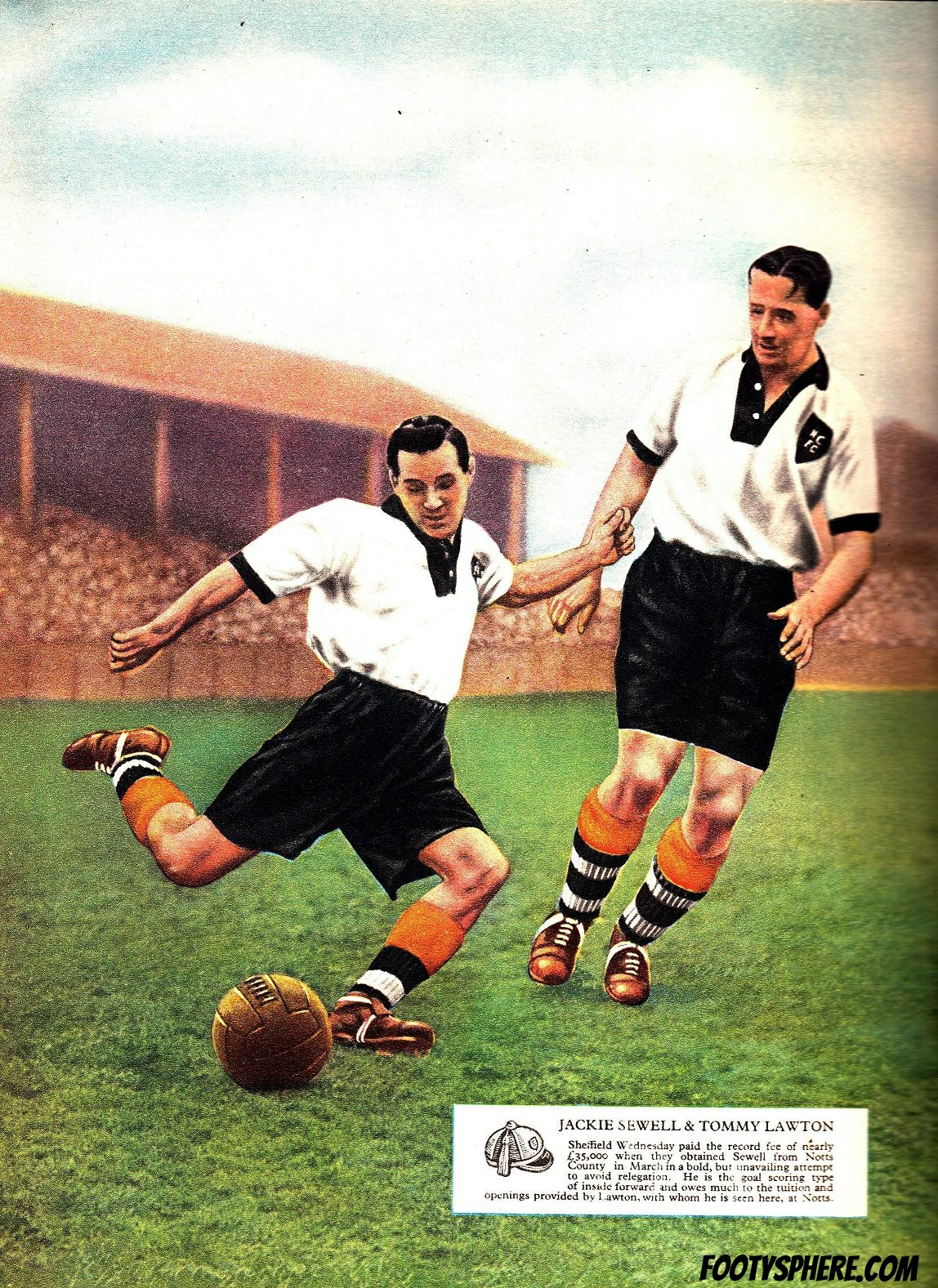
Jackie Sewell (left) and Tommy Lawton

By 1935, Notts County were back in the Third Division South, where they remained at the outbreak of World War II; once again, competitive football was suspended. In 1947, after the league had resumed, and whilst still a third tier club, Notts paid £20,000 (which was the British transfer record at the time) to sign England forward Tommy Lawton. Lawton's presence resulted in a significant increase in Notts County's crowds. A home match with Swansea Town on Boxing Day 1947 was attended by 45,116 spectators, with an estimated 10,000 locked outside. Over the next three seasons, Lawton forged a productive goalscoring partnership with Jackie Sewell, culminating in the Magpies winning the Third Division South title in the 1949–50 season. The championship was secured with a 2–0 home win over Nottingham Forest played before 46,000 spectators.

Sewell was controversially sold to Sheffield Wednesday in 1951, and Lawton left in 1952. Notts spent most of the 1950s in the Second Division, but suffered consecutive relegations in 1958 and 1959 to drop into the Fourth Division for the first time. They immediately won promotion as runners-up, and celebrated their centenary in 1962 as a Third Division club; the occasion was marked with a friendly against an England XI. Prominent players during this period include Tony Hateley, who established himself as one of the club's most prolific strikers before being sold to Aston Villa in 1963. The Magpies were ultimately relegated back to the Fourth Division in 1963–64, and continued to struggle for the next few years; in 1966–67, the team finished 20th, avoiding the need to apply for re-election only on goal average ahead of Rochdale.

=== Sirrel and Warnock eras ===
In 1969, Notts County appointed Jimmy Sirrel as manager. He already had several promising players at his disposal, including Les Bradd, to become Notts County's all-time record goal scorer, and Don Masson, described in one club history as Notts County's greatest ever passer of the ball. In 1970–71, Hateley returned to the club; he scored 22 goals and the Magpies won the Fourth Division championship. The team amassed 69 points, equalling the then record, and completed the entire season unbeaten at home. Notts narrowly missed out on consecutive promotions in 1971–72, finishing fourth in the Third Division, but they ended runners-up a year later, and so were promoted to the Second Division. Masson was sold to Queens Park Rangers in 1974, and Sirrel left to become manager of Sheffield United a year later. Notts fell short of promotion in 1975–76, but they did knock First Division Leeds United out of the League Cup in a 1–0 win at Elland Road.

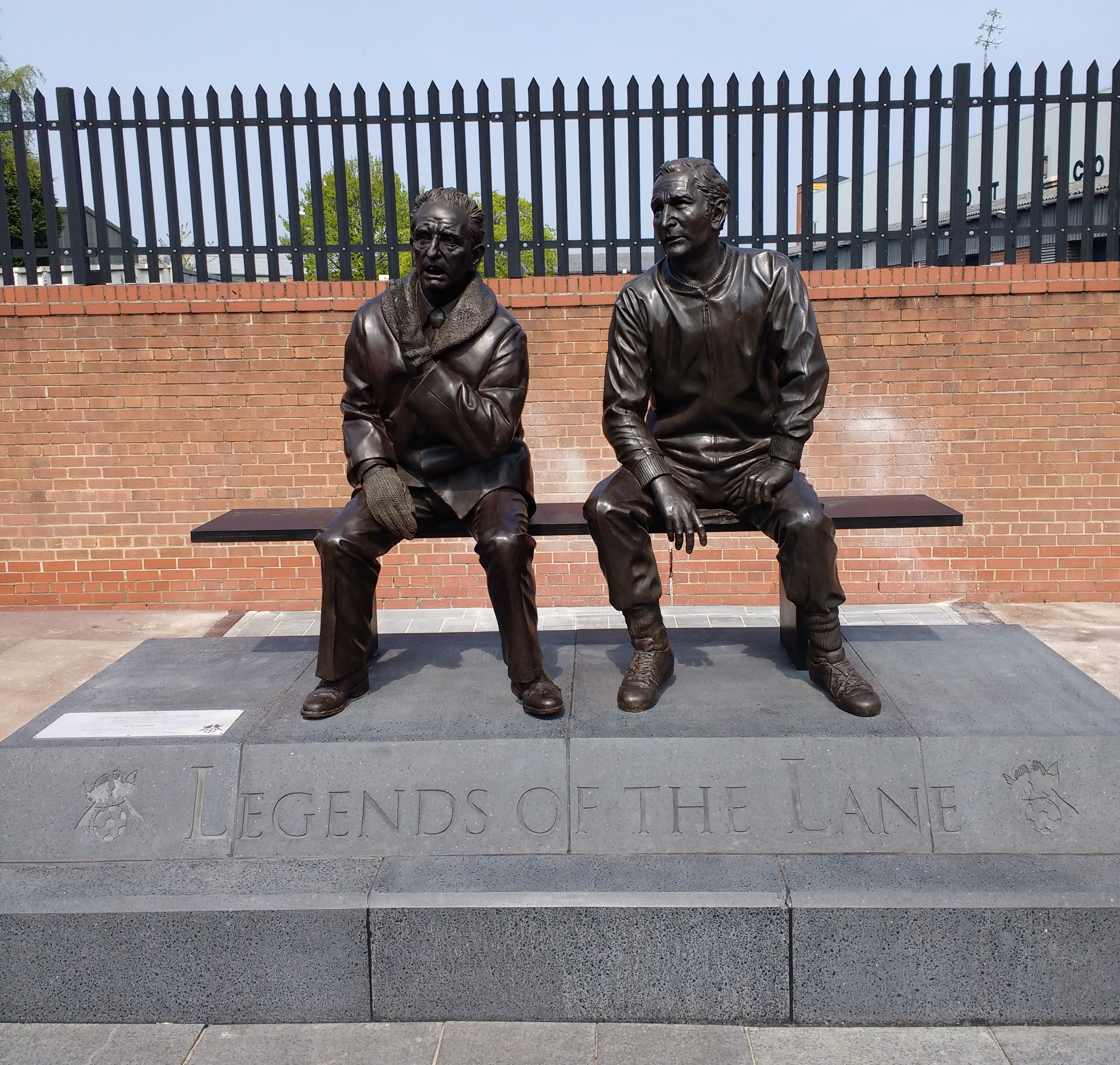
Statue of Jimmy Sirrel (left) with his trainer Jack Wheeler

Sirrel returned as manager in 1977, and Masson followed in 1978. In 1980–81, the Magpies finished as runners-up in the Second Division, and so won promotion to the First Division after a 55 year absence. Their first match back in top flight was away at Villa, the reigning league champions, and resulted in a 1–0 win for Notts. The Magpies had been a pre-season favourite for immediate relegation, but the team finished 15th, surviving comfortably despite losing 4 of their last 5 games. The 1982–83 season saw off-field changes, with Sirrel becoming "club manager" and Howard Wilkinson becoming "team manager", and the team once again avoided the drop. Wilkinson moved to Sheffield Wednesday in 1983, replaced by Larry Lloyd; there was talk of the team being capable of qualifying for European competitions, but they were relegated back to the Second Division in 1984.

Lloyd and his successor Richie Barker were both sacked before Sirrel once again took charge during the 1984–85 season; he could not prevent Notts from suffering a second consecutive relegation, but remained in post until May 1987. Notts were still a Third Division club in 1989, when they appointed Neil Warnock as manager. In 1989–90, his first full season in charge, Warnock led the Magpies to third place in the Third Division, and the team ultimately won promotion to the Second Division by beating Tranmere Rovers 2–0 in the Third Division play-off final, the club's first ever match at Wembley Stadium. Notts returned to Wembley 12 months later, this time for the Second Division play-off final, and the team won consecutive promotions to the First Division by beating Brighton & Hove Albion 3–1. Notts County's return to the First Division was short lived, and they were relegated back to the second tier at the end of the 1991–92 season.

=== Recent history ===
Relegation meant that Notts County narrowly missed out on participating in the first season of the Premier League. Warnock departed in 1993, and the team was relegated to the Second Division (as the third tier was now known) in 1995, though they did also win the Anglo-Italian Cup that year. After losing the 1996 Second Division play-off final to Bradford City, the Magpies suffered a club-record 20 game winless run during 1996–97 and were consequently relegated to the Third Division. Under manager Sam Allardyce, Notts won the Third Division championship in 1997–98, becoming the first team since World War II to win promotion in March, and breaking several club records, including longest winning run (10 games). A 3–1 win at Bury on 9 October 1999 put the Magpies second in the Second Division, but Allardyce resigned shortly afterwards to become manager of Bolton, and Notts ultimately finished the 1999–2000 season in eighth.

Beginning in the early 21st century, Notts County were beset by a series of serious off-field problems. Between 2002 and 2003, the club spent a record 534 days in administration and, although bankruptcy was avoided, the team were relegated to the fourth tier (shortly to be rechristened League Two) in 2004. They were still there in 2009, when the club was taken over by Munto Finance, purportedly a wealthy Middle East-based consortium who appointed former England manager Sven-Göran Eriksson as director of football. In reality, Munto Finance was controlled by the convicted fraudster Russell King; the takeover had collapsed by December 2009, and Notts were left at risk of being wound up over unpaid debts. This was prevented in a further takeover by Ray Trew, and the 2009–10 season ended successfully, with the team winning the League Two championship. The Magpies remained in League One for five seasons before being relegated back to League Two in 2015.

Trew sold the club to Alan Hardy in December 2016. Notts reached the League Two play-off semi-finals in 2018, but Hardy put the club up for sale in January 2019 with the team bottom of the table. The Magpies ended the 2018–19 season relegated from the Football League for the first time in their history, before Hardy sold to Christoffer and Alexander Reedtz in July 2019. Notts lost the 2020 National League play-off final to Harrogate Town, and ultimately remained a National League club for three more years. In 2022–23, the Magpies amassed 107 points, but nevertheless the team finished four points behind Wrexham, their points tally setting a record for a team finishing second. Notts eventually won promotion to League Two via the play-offs, defeating Chesterfield 4–3 in a penalty shootout in the 2023 National League play-off final following a 2–2 draw at Wembley Stadium. They were promoted to League One at the end of the 2025–26 season after beating Salford City 3–0 in the League Two play-off final.

== Club identity ==
=== Name and nicknames ===
At the meeting to formally organise the club in December 1864, members passed a resolution establishing "Notts Foot Ball Club", "Notts" being an abbreviation of Nottinghamshire. The club was variously described in its early days as Nottinghamshire, Nottingham, Notts or Notts Club; Warsop and Brown suggest that the name Notts County eventually arose from the need to distinguish the club from other local teams and (after 1882) the Nottinghamshire County Football Association. Notts County are the only English club whose proper name includes an abbreviation.

An 1883 Sheffield Daily Telegraph report, previewing a Nottingham derby between Notts and Forest, gives Notts County's nickname as the "Patricians". (Note: "For the next few days all Nottingham will be divided into two camps, 'Foresters' and 'Patricians.'") Before becoming the "Magpies", Notts were known as the "Lambs"; Brown suggests this was a reference to a notorious gang from Nottingham's Narrow Marsh slums active in the nineteenth century. After Notts adopted black-and-white striped shirts, they were quickly nicknamed the "Magpies", though this continued to be used interchangeably with "Lambs" for some time. Warsop found one news report where both nicknames were used, and usage of the "Lambs" nickname by the press only petered out in the early 1900s.

=== Colours and kits ===
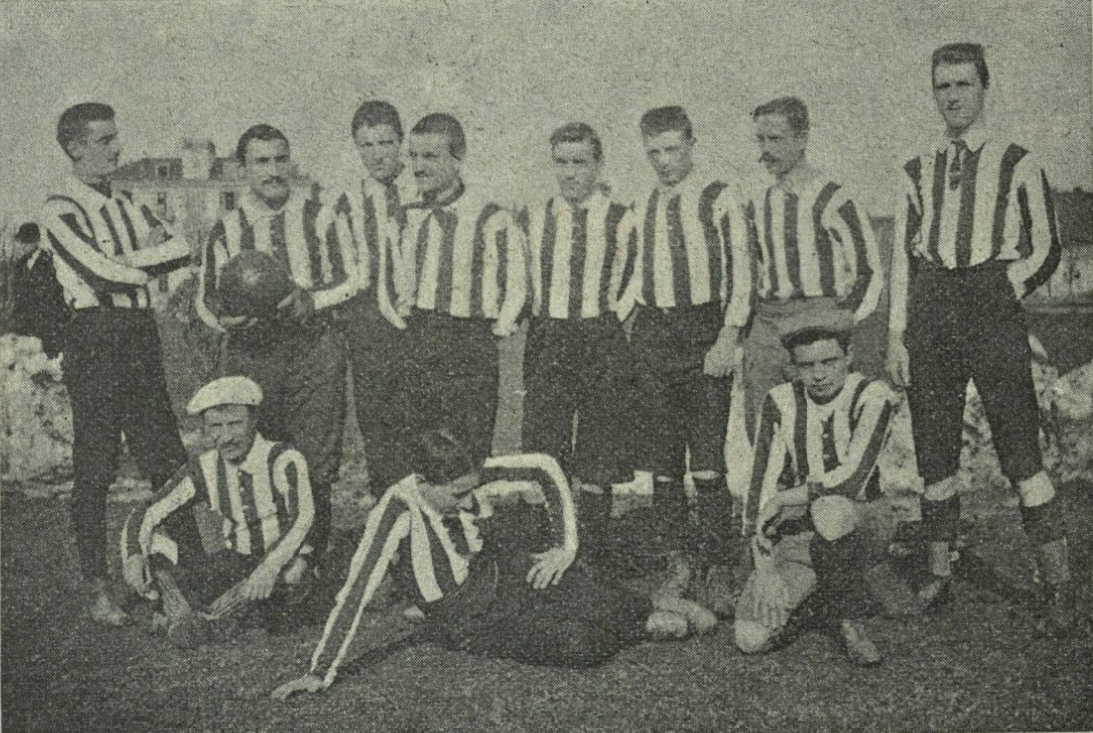
The Juventus team of 1902: they adopted Notts County's black-and-white stripes.

Notts wore blue caps in their match against Sheffield in January 1865. In February 1867, the Nottingham Guardian reported that Notts wore orange-and-black hoops in a game against Sheffield; this is the earliest known report of a team wearing a specially produced kit. In 1880, Notts adopted chocolate-and-blue-halved shirts, which they wore until 1890, when black-and-white-striped shirts were first worn. With the exception of the 1934–35 season, when Notts briefly returned to chocolate and blue, black and white have remained the club's colours since 1890. Black-and-white stripes have been the norm, though there has been some variation; in 1923, the team wore white shirts with a black chevron, during World War II, hoops were sometimes worn, and between 1946 and 1952, a white shirt with a black collar and cuffs was used.

At the end of 1901, Italian club Juventus were seeking to replace the pink shirts they had worn since their formation. John Savage, an English member of the Juventus team, arranged for a Notts-supporting friend in England to send a new set of kits to Turin, and Juventus have played in black-and-white stripes ever since. In September 2011, in recognition of the connection between the two clubs, Juventus invited Notts County to be their first opponents at the new Juventus Stadium.

=== Crest ===
A crest first appeared on Notts County's shirts in 1923, coinciding with promotion to the First Division, when a magpie was depicted on the breast of the shirts. This lasted until 1926, when the club returned to the Second Division. From 1948, a large black shield with "NCFC" embroidered into it began appearing on shirts. This remained in place until 1950, when the club adopted a new crest with a magpie surmounted on a football surrounded by the club's initials. However, the season began poorly and the Notts chairman, believing the magpie to be bringing the team bad luck, ordered the crest removed from the shirts. The team won their next match and the crest never returned. A crest based on Nottingham's coat of arms was used from 1962, before a magpie reappeared on the shirts in 1977. A crest with two magpies has been the norm since 1986, with the current badge adopted in 2010. In the 2009–10 season, the club used a crest incorporating the logo of Swiss Commodity Holding, a company with close connections to Munto Finance, the consortium who made the abortive takeover of Notts during that season.

== Grounds ==
=== Early grounds ===
The testimony of founding members indicates that, prior to the club's formal organisation, they would meet at Park Hollow in The Park, Nottingham, to practice football amongst themselves. C.L. Rothera, an early club secretary, recalled being "taken by my father to the Park, where he and his partner and a number of younger men, principally from the banks, met to kick a ball about, without any very definite rules." These meetings had moved to the Meadows Cricket Ground by 1863, the same ground that the club's first organised matches took place on. The Meadows remained the club's main home ground until October 1877, though the team occasionally played important fixtures, such as an 1873 match against a representative team from London, at Trent Bridge. In 1877, Notts moved home matches to the Gentlemen of Nottinghamshire Cricket Club's ground in Beeston, and, between 1878 and 1880, the club split its games between the Meadows, Trent Bridge and Beeston. In 1880, Notts moved to the Castle Ground, where they remained until 1883.

=== Trent Bridge ===
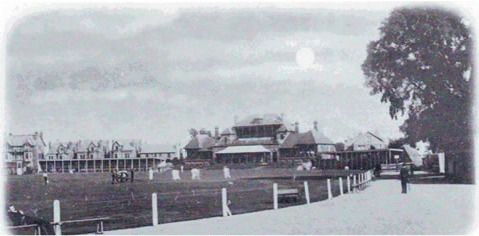
Photograph of Trent Bridge c. 1890

Notts moved to Trent Bridge in 1883, taking over the tenancy from Forest. Football was played on the Fox Road side of the ground, and facilities were initially basic, with only a small stand at the Radcliffe Road end and the pavilion, the latter of which being some distance away from the football pitch. Later developments included a stand which Notts took with them when they moved to Meadow Lane in 1910. Notts County's record attendance at Trent Bridge was 25,000, reported for an FA Cup third round tie against Tottenham Hotspur in February 1907 and again for a First Division match against Everton in December 1908.

Cricket took priority at Trent Bridge, and Notts were consequently required to play early and late season fixtures at other grounds. Initially, they used the Meadows and the Castle Ground as alternative venues, but eventually they began using Forest's grounds. Notts County first used the Town Ground in 1895, and first played at the City Ground in 1899; they continued to use the latter as their alternative venue until 1908. In 1901, a row broke out when Stoke defeated Notts 4–2 at the City Ground, a result crucial to the former avoiding relegation. Other clubs argued that Stoke had gained an unfair advantage by not playing at Notts County's main home venue, and in 1902 the Football League asked that Notts play all their home matches at one ground. Eventually, in 1908, the trustees of Trent Bridge decided not to renew the football club's lease, giving them two years to find a new ground.

=== Meadow Lane ===
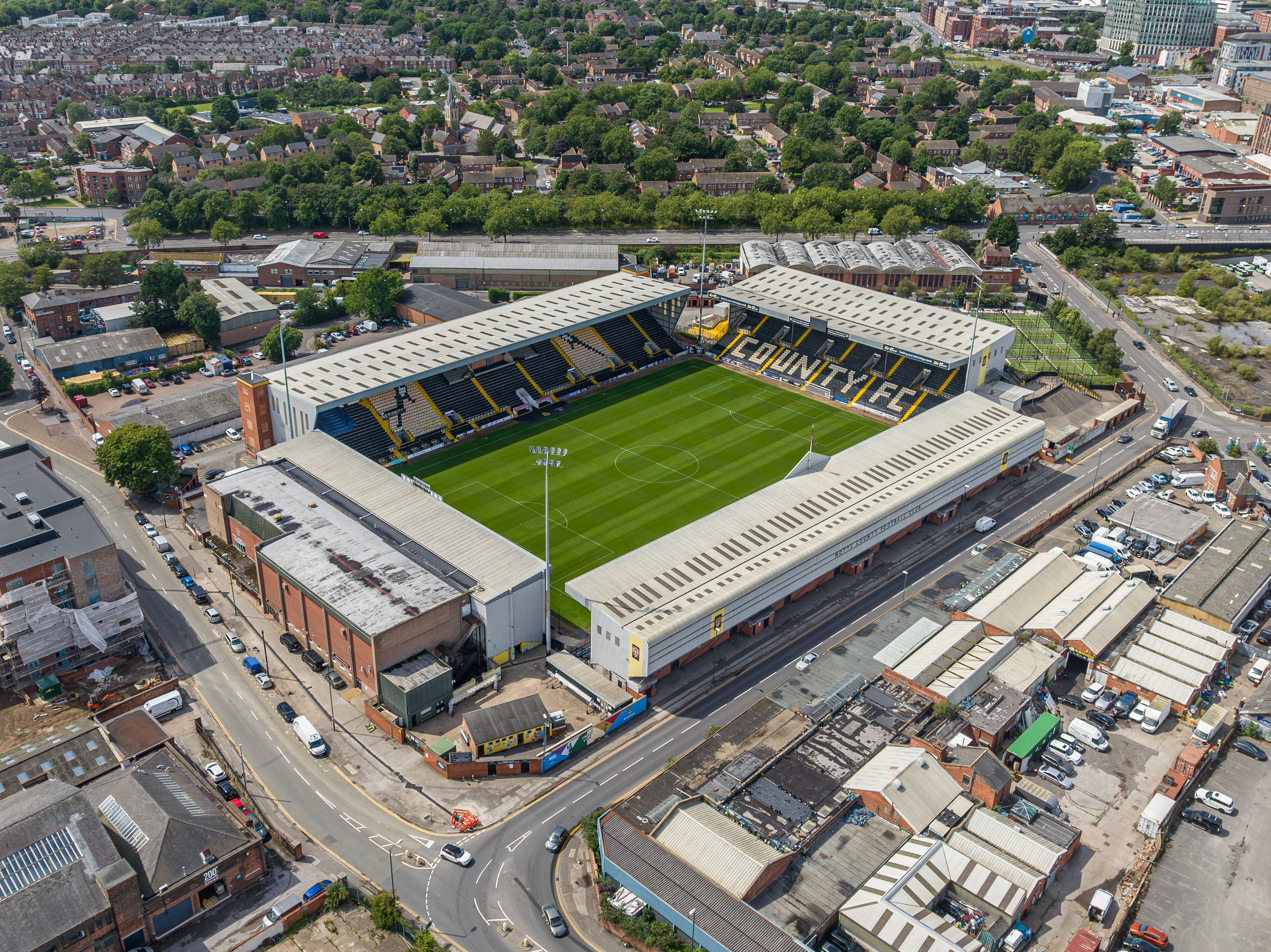
Meadow Lane following redevelopment in the 1990s

Notts leased land on Meadow Lane from Nottingham Corporation in 1910, and swiftly set about developing a new ground there. It opened on 3 September 1910, when Notts drew 1–1 with Forest before 27,000 spectators. Originally, a stream ran adjacent to the ground on its "Leenside", and the club employed a man with a long pole and cane basket charged with retrieving the ball when it entered the water. In 1925, the stream was covered and the County Road stand was built. In 1941, during World War II, the ground was heavily damaged by bombing, forcing Notts to withdraw from wartime competition in the 1941–42 season. In 1949, 10 to 12 feet of height was added to the Spion Kop end of the ground to help accommodate the large crowds attending matches at that time.

The Meadow Lane end was demolished in 1978, to be replaced by a complex containing a social club, executive boxes and squash and tennis courts. In 1985, the pitch was shortened as spectators in the boxes were unable to see the goalmouth directly below them. Major redevelopment work to convert Meadow Lane into an all-seater stadium occurred in the 1990s, with three stands rebuilt during one summer in 1992. The original main stand stood until 1994 when it too was replaced. In 2019, the stadium held a maximum capacity of 19,841 spectators for football matches, with 20,211 seats overall. During the 2023–24 season, average attendance at the ground was 10,905, the third highest in League Two.

== Supporters and rivalries ==
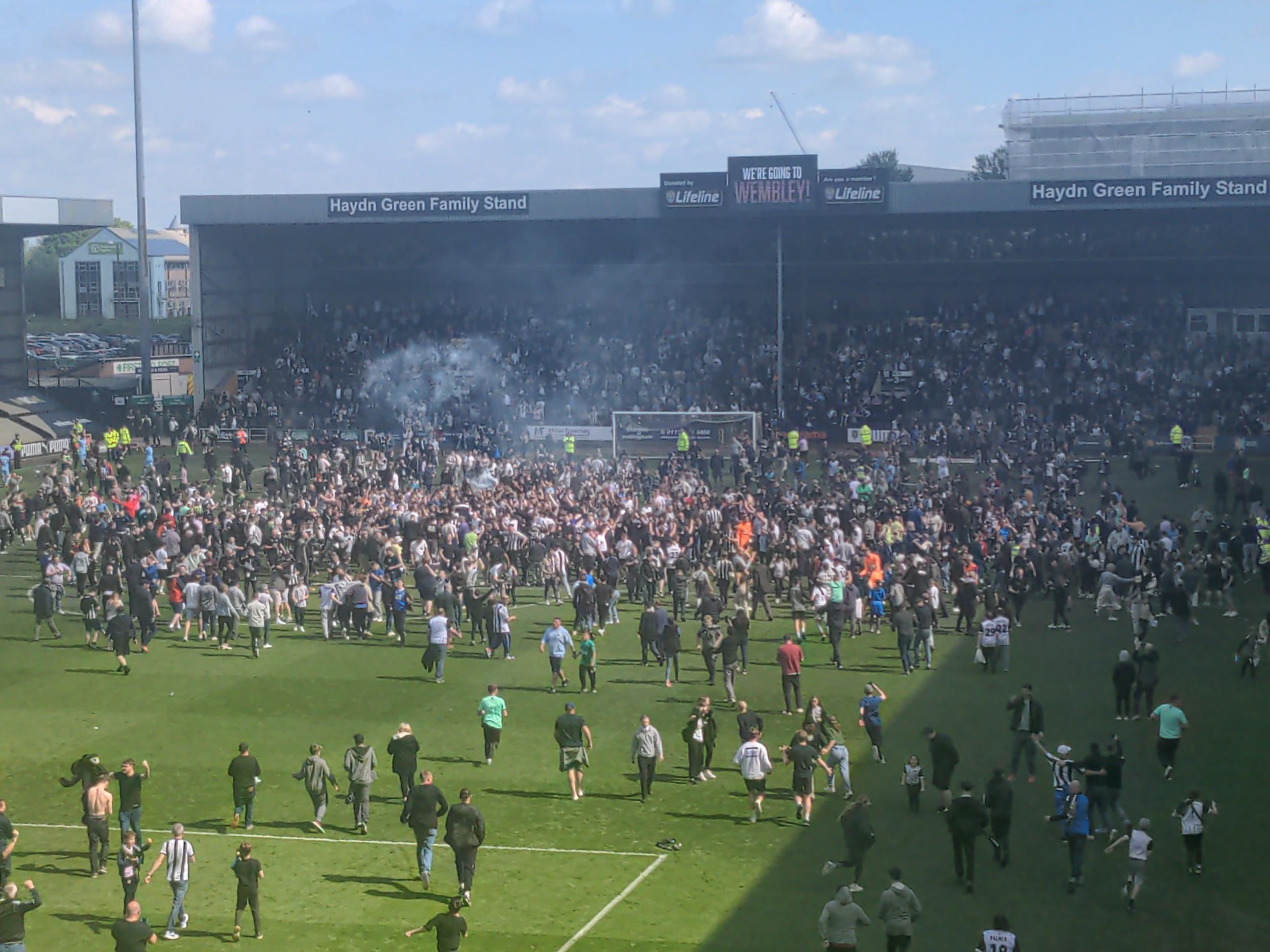
Notts County supporters celebrate the team reaching the 2023 National League play-off final

Supporters gained representation on the board of directors in 2003 through the Notts County Supporters' Trust. The Trust later gained a majority shareholding in the club, but in July 2009 Trust members were persuaded to transfer the shares to Munto Finance. Munto Finance's takeover had collapsed by December 2009, and Notts County have been cited as an example of fan ownership of clubs gone awry. A 2007 survey declared Notts County as the most stressful team to support on account of its frequent on-field struggles and financial problems; the survey was still being cited in the press as relevant in 2023.

Notts County supporters are known to chant the "Wheelbarrow Song" to the tune of "On Top of Old Smokey", consisting of the lyrics "I had a wheelbarrow, the wheel fell off". In 1981, a group of supporters produced a record to mark the team's promotion to the First Division; Noel Edmonds later featured it on his BBC Radio 1 show in a competition to establish the worst record ever made. Fans produced various fanzines between the 1980s and the 2000s, the longest running of which was The Pie, which ran for 87 issues between 1987 and 2009. In 2024, the National Lottery Heritage Fund supported a project led by LeftLion, a Nottingham-based arts and culture magazine, to digitize and make available online all issues of The Pie and The Almighty Brian, its Forest counterpart.

Notts County first played their neighbours Nottingham Forest in March 1866, in Forest's first ever match. This makes the Nottingham derby, as matches between the two clubs are known, one of football's oldest fixtures. A team of 17 Forest players took on a Notts team of 11, and the match finished 0–0. In total, the teams have played each other in 94 league and cup matches, with Notts winning on 30 occasions, Forest 39 and with 25 draws. Competitive matches have grown rare; since 1957, the two clubs have been in the same division during only nine seasons, and a 2011 League Cup match, itself the first meeting of the two in 17 years, remains their most recent encounter. Notts County's other local derby is with Mansfield Town; the two clubs most recently played each other in the 2023–24 season.

== Statistics and records ==
Chart showing the progress of Notts County F.C. through the English football league system

Goalkeeper Albert Iremonger holds the record for Notts County appearances, having played 601 matches for the club between 1904 and 1926, 564 coming in the league and 37 in the FA Cup. Iremonger also holds the record for consecutive appearances for Notts; he played in 222 straight matches between 1907 and 1912 until suspension brought this run to an end. A road adjacent to Notts County's ground is named in his honour. Les Bradd is the club's all-time leading goal scorer, having scored 137 goals between 1967 and 1978. The record for most goals scored for Notts in a single season is held by Macaulay Langstaff, who scored 42 goals for the Magpies in 2022–23.

Notts recorded their biggest winning margin on 24 October 1885, when they defeated Rotherham Town 15–0 in an FA Cup tie. Their record winning margin in the league is ten goals, accomplished in a 10–0 win over Burslem Port Vale in the Second Division on 26 February 1895 and again in an 11–1 win over Newport County in the Third Division South on 15 January 1949. The 2022–23 team broke several club records; it accumulated 107 points and won 32 league matches, surpassing the records of 99 points and 30 wins held respectively by its 1997–98 and 1970–71 counterparts. The 2022–23 team's 117 league goals bettered the 1959–60 team's tally of 107, and it went unbeaten for 25 league matches, surpassing a run of 19 league matches without defeat during 1930.

Notts County's record home attendance was recorded on 12 March 1955, when the Magpies played York City of the Third Division North in an FA Cup quarter-final. The match was attended by 47,310 spectators, and was won 1–0 by the visitors. The record home attendance for a league game was the 46,000 who attended the Third Division South match with Forest on 22 April 1950. It was during the 1949–50 season that a record average crowd of 35,176 attended matches at Meadow Lane. Notts County also hold the record attendance for a National League game, set when 16,511 attended a 0–0 draw with Yeovil Town on 19 November 2022. The largest crowd that Notts County have ever played in front of was the 61,003 who attended an FA Cup tie against Liverpool at Anfield on 29 January 1949.

In total Notts County has been promoted 15 times and relegated 17 times, and they have played in each of the top five divisions of English football. They were founder members of the Football League (and so the first tier) in 1888, first played in the second tier in 1893, the third tier in 1930, the fourth tier in 1959, and the fifth tier in 2019. Notts County's highest overall league finish is third, first achieved in the 1890–91 season, and repeated ten seasons later in 1900–01. Notts played their 5,000th Football League match in October 2023, becoming the eighth club to reach that milestone. Before relegation to non-League football in 2019, the Magpies had played the most Football League matches of any club, but they were overtaken by Preston North End in January 2020.

== Ownership and finances ==
Notts County became a limited company in 1890 under the legal name of the Notts. Incorporated Football Club. Buoyed by the team's third place finish and run to the FA Cup final in 1890–91, the club made plans to open a billiard room and clubhouse on Nottingham's Thurland Street. However, attendances fell and this, combined with an increase to the salaries of players after the FA Cup run, left Notts in a poor financial state. When the team were relegated at the end of the 1892–93 season, the chairman and four directors resigned, and the club considered declining to play in the Second Division in favour of the Midland Football League, which would provide more local derbies. This ultimately did not happen, and the club's financial position improved following its win in the 1894 FA Cup final.

In 1928, the chairman Henry Heath described Notts County's finances as "the worst in the club's history". In an effort to resolve the situation, the directors decided to wind up the old company and replace it with a new one, Notts County Football Club Ltd. The plan required the sale £20,000 of shares, but the public response to the share issue was poor, and the Notts. Incorporated Football Club had been reinstated by October 1928. A new share issue was made in 1966, a year after the club had been at serious risk of closure; the board of directors had decided that the club could not continue, but an investment of £10,000 from Nottingham businessman Bill Hopcroft ensured the Magpies survived. In 1968, Jack Dunnett, a local MP, became Notts County's chairman. Dunnett also served as President of the Football League during his tenure, being elected to that position in 1981, shortly after Notts County's promotion to the First Division.

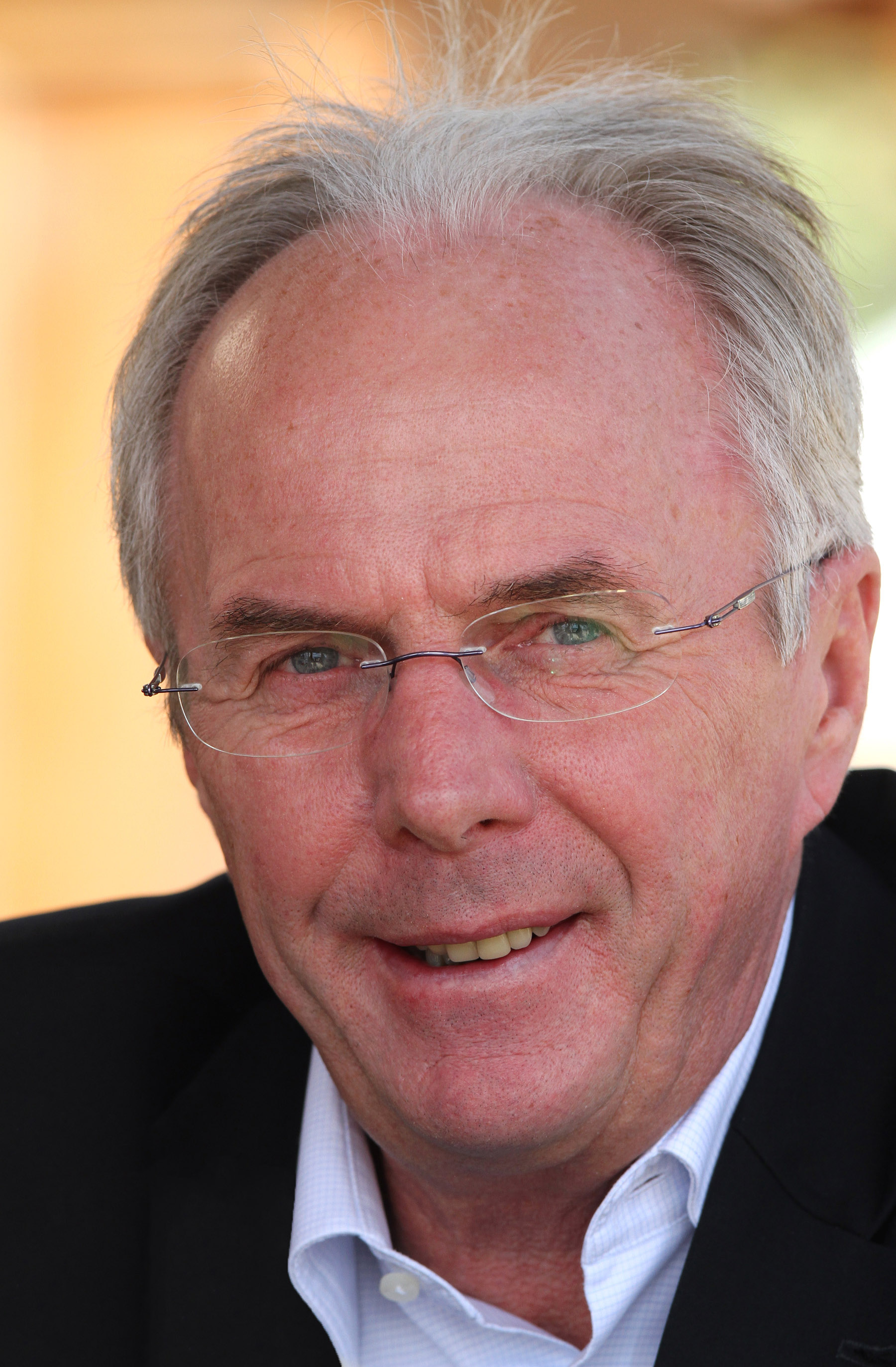
Sven-Göran Eriksson (pictured in 2012) was briefly Notts County's director of football after the 2009 takeover.

By 1986, Notts had a deficit of £1.8m and the club's future was once again in question. A crisis meeting attended by 1,500 supporters (with others locked outside) was held at Nottingham's Astoria nightclub in September 1986, where the board of directors presented a blueprint to salvage the situation. The result was the launch of Lifeline, a scheme to raise funds for the club which still operates. Derek Pavis became chairman in 1987; during his tenure, the club collected several large transfer fees for its players, including for Tommy Johnson and Craig Short, and Meadow Lane saw significant redevelopment. Pavis remained in charge until 2000, when he made a deal to sell his shares to the American businessman Albert Scardino.

Notts invested significant sums of money in its squad in an effort to win promotion to the First Division (now the EFL Championship) while Scardino attempted to secure loans to fund his takeover. Instead, the team narrowly avoided relegation to the Third Division (now EFL League Two) in the 2001–02 season, and soon afterwards, with no loans forthcoming, Scardino placed the Magpies into administration. After a protracted period in administration, bankruptcy was avoided by a takeover largely financed by supporter Haydn Green. The Notts County Supporters' Trust also gained representation on the board of directors as part of the agreement. In 2007, shortly before his death, Green sold his shares in the club to the Trust, making the latter majority shareholder.

The Trust grew unpopular, and in 2009 it handed over control of the club to Munto Finance, purportedly a wealthy Middle East-based consortium. Sven-Göran Eriksson, who was appointed director of football soon after Munto Finance's takeover, said his ambition was to see the Magpies promoted to the Premier League, and the club began to spend lavishly. In August 2009, Notts signed goalkeeper Kasper Schmeichel from Manchester City for an undisclosed fee, which was believed to surpass the club record. Soon afterwards, they signed England international Sol Campbell on a contract reportedly worth £40,000 per week. In reality, the takeover had been orchestrated by the convicted fraudster, Russell King, as part of a complex plot to list a fake mining company on the stock exchange, and the promised money did not exist. King fled when his scheme collapsed, resulting in a management buyout, with the club at risk of being wound-up over unpaid debts.

Bankruptcy was avoided with a further takeover by Ray Trew. As a result, Eriksson left, writing off £2.5million owed to him by the club. Trew remained chairman until February 2016, when he stepped down and put the club up for sale, citing "foul and mindless" abuse from fans as his reason for doing so. The club were subject to winding-up petitions by HM Revenue and Customs (HMRC) over unpaid taxes, before Trew sold the club to Alan Hardy in December 2016. In turn, Hardy made the club available for sale in January 2019. Notts were once again issued with winding-up petitions by HMRC, and staff went without pay for two months, before a sale to Christoffer and Alexander Reedtz was agreed in July 2019. Their ownership coincided with increased attendance, and saw the completion of infrastructure projects such as "The Nest", a former factory adjacent to Meadow Lane, converted for use as a "fanzone".

== Notts County in the media ==
In 1959, Colin Slater began reporting on Notts County for the Nottingham Evening News, his first match covered being a 2–1 win for the Magpies over Chester. He became BBC Radio Nottingham's Notts County correspondent in 1968, first reporting for the station on a 5–0 defeat to Lincoln City, and reported or commentated on more than 2,500 matches before retiring, his final game covered coming against Newport in May 2017. Slater became strongly identified with the club, known as "the voice of Notts County". Slater died in January 2022; before his funeral, his cortege visited Meadow Lane, where it was given a guard of honour by dozens of Notts supporters.

In 2002, the BBC broadcast Paradise Heights, a drama series set in Nottingham. Ralph Little's character was a Notts County fan, and Little was required to sing the "Wheelbarrow Song". In 2003, journalist David McVay published Steak…Diana Ross: Diary of a Football Nobody, recounting his time as a Magpies player in the 1970's. In 2012, playwright William Ivory, a Notts County supporter, wrote a play based on McVay's book, which ran at the Nottingham Playhouse. Ivory often references Notts County in his screenplays, including his 2013 TV show Truckers. Another Notts fan, Shane Meadows, also references the club in some of his work, including his 1997 film TwentyFourSeven.

There is an episode of BBC Radio 5's Sport's Strangest Crimes, narrated by Nottingham-born Alice Levine, called The Trillion Dollar Conman. It tells the story of when conman Russell King took over the club in 2009. In 2026, a book of the same name was released, written by Ben Robinson. The same year, the Sky documentary King of Lies: Football's Trillion Dollar Con was shown.

During the 2022–23 season, Notts County were involved in an intense race with Wrexham for the National League's championship and its solitary automatic promotion place. As a result, Notts featured in the FX television show Welcome to Wrexham, documenting the actors Ryan Reynolds and Rob McElhenney's takeover of Wrexham.

== Players ==
=== Current squad ===
As of 8 October 2026

Note: Flags indicate national team as defined under FIFA eligibility rules; some limited exceptions apply. Players may hold more than one non-FIFA nationality.

No.	Pos.	Nation	Player
1	GK	ENG	James Belshaw
2	DF	ENG	James Gibbons
3	DF	ENG	Rod McDonald
4	DF	GRN	Jacob Bedeau
5	DF	ENG	Matty Platt
6	MF	ENG	Max Sanders
7	MF	ENG	Callum Roberts
8	MF	WAL	Ollie Cooper (on loan from Swansea City)
9	FW	SLE	Daniel Kanu (on loan from Charlton Athletic)
10	DF	ENG	Rosaire Longelo
11	MF	IRL	Conor Grant
12	DF	ENG	Lucas Ness
14	MF	IRL	Darius Lipsiuc
15	MF	ENG	Jack Evans
16	MF	SCO	Dean Campbell

No.	Pos.	Nation	Player
18	MF	ENG	Matt Palmer (captain)
19	FW	AUS	Luka Smyth
20	MF	SCO	Scott Robertson
21	GK	ENG	Harry Griffiths
22	MF	CMR	Beck-Ray Enoru
25	DF	CYP	Nick Tsaroulla
26	DF	ENG	Ishé Samuels-Smith (on loan from Chelsea)
27	MF	IRL	Rory Finneran (on loan from Newcastle United)
28	DF	SCO	Lewis Macari
33	FW	ENG	Emile Acquah
39	FW	ZIM	Lee Ndlovu
42	MF	SLE	Hindolo Mustapha (on loan from Crystal Palace)
44	DF	WAL	Matt Baker

==== Out on loan ====
Note: Flags indicate national team as defined under FIFA eligibility rules; some limited exceptions apply. Players may hold more than one non-FIFA nationality.

No.	Pos.	Nation	Player
23	DF	IRL	Luke Browne (at Torquay United until 25 October 2026)
30	MF	ENG	Ryley Reynolds (at Grimsby Town until 30 June 2027)
49	MF	ENG	Kameron Muir (at Hereford until 25 October 2026)
—	FW	ENG	Harrison Iwunze (at Hereford until 1 January 2027)
—	MF	ENG	Harrison Hazard (at Redditch United until 1 January 2027)
—	MF	ENG	Mazier Kouhyar (at Kidderminster Harriers until 1 January 2027)

== Coaching staff ==
As of 22 June 2025

- Head coach: Martin Paterson
- Assistant head coach: Andy Edwards
- Assistant Coach: Sam Slocombe
- Goalkeeper Coach: Steve Collis
- Club Secretary & Player Liaison: Jenni Short
- Head of Medical Services: Craig Heiden
- Head of Sports Science & Sports Therapist: Jane Jackson
- First Team Analyst: James Pidcock

== Managers ==
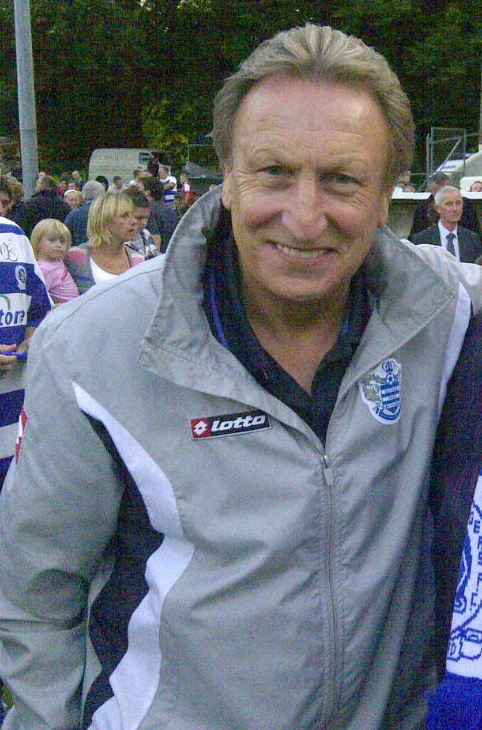
Neil Warnock (pictured in 2011) managed the Magpies between 1989 and 1993

For the first half century of the club's existence, the team was selected by committee. Even when Albert Fisher was appointed Notts County's first recognised manager in 1913, his team selections were initially subject to committee approval. Fisher remained in charge until 1927, his 14-year tenure the longest of any Notts manager, (Note: Jimmy Sirrel's tenure stretched over 18 years, but this was in three spells. Sirrel was manager of Sheffield United between 1975 and 1977, and responsibility for the team was handled by Howard Wilkinson, Larry Lloyd and Richie Barker between 1982 and 1985.) during which time the Magpies twice won promotion from the Second Division and reached an FA Cup semi-final. Fisher was succeeded by Horace Henshall, who signed Tom Keetley and oversaw promotion from the Third Division South in 1931.

After World War II, Arthur Stollery was appointed manager. Stollery had previously been a trainer at Chelsea where he worked with Tommy Lawton, and Stollery played a key part in convincing Lawton to join the Magpies. Stollery resigned for health reasons in 1949, and it was ultimately under his successor Eric Houghton that Notts won promotion from the Third Division South. Lawton himself would manage the team in the 1950s, but his tenure was unsuccessful and ended in his sacking. Frank Hill led the Magpies to promotion from the Fourth Division in 1960 and introduced Tony Hateley into the team, while Jeff Astle first played under Hill's successor Ernie Coleman.

Jimmy Sirrel had three spells as manager between 1969 and 1987, during which the Magpies won promotion from the Fourth, Third and Second Division. Sirrel is regarded as Notts County's greatest manager; a stand at Meadow Lane is named in his honour, and a statue of him and his assistant Jack Wheeler can be found near the ground, as can a mural of Sirrel with his Forest counterpart Brian Clough. Neil Warnock was appointed manager in 1989, and he oversaw successive promotions from the Third to First Division via the play-offs and a single season in the top flight. By 1997, the Magpies were in the Third Division (the fourth tier, now League Two), and Sam Allardyce led them to the divisional title.

Notts began the 2009–10 season under the leadership of Ian McParland before he was sacked in October 2009, and his replacement Hans Backe lasted only seven games before his resignation in December 2009. It was under Backe's eventual successor Steve Cotterill that the Magpies clinched the League Two championship. Cotterill could not be persuaded to remain at the club at the end of the title-winning season, and there were frequent changes of manager under Ray Trew's chairmanship, contributing to instability and disillusionment among fans. By 2019, Notts were a non-League club; it was under head coach Luke Williams that the Magpies returned to the Football League in 2023. The club's current head coach is Martin Paterson, who was appointed to the role in June 2025 and guided Notts to League One, winning the 2026 League Two play-off final.

== Honours ==
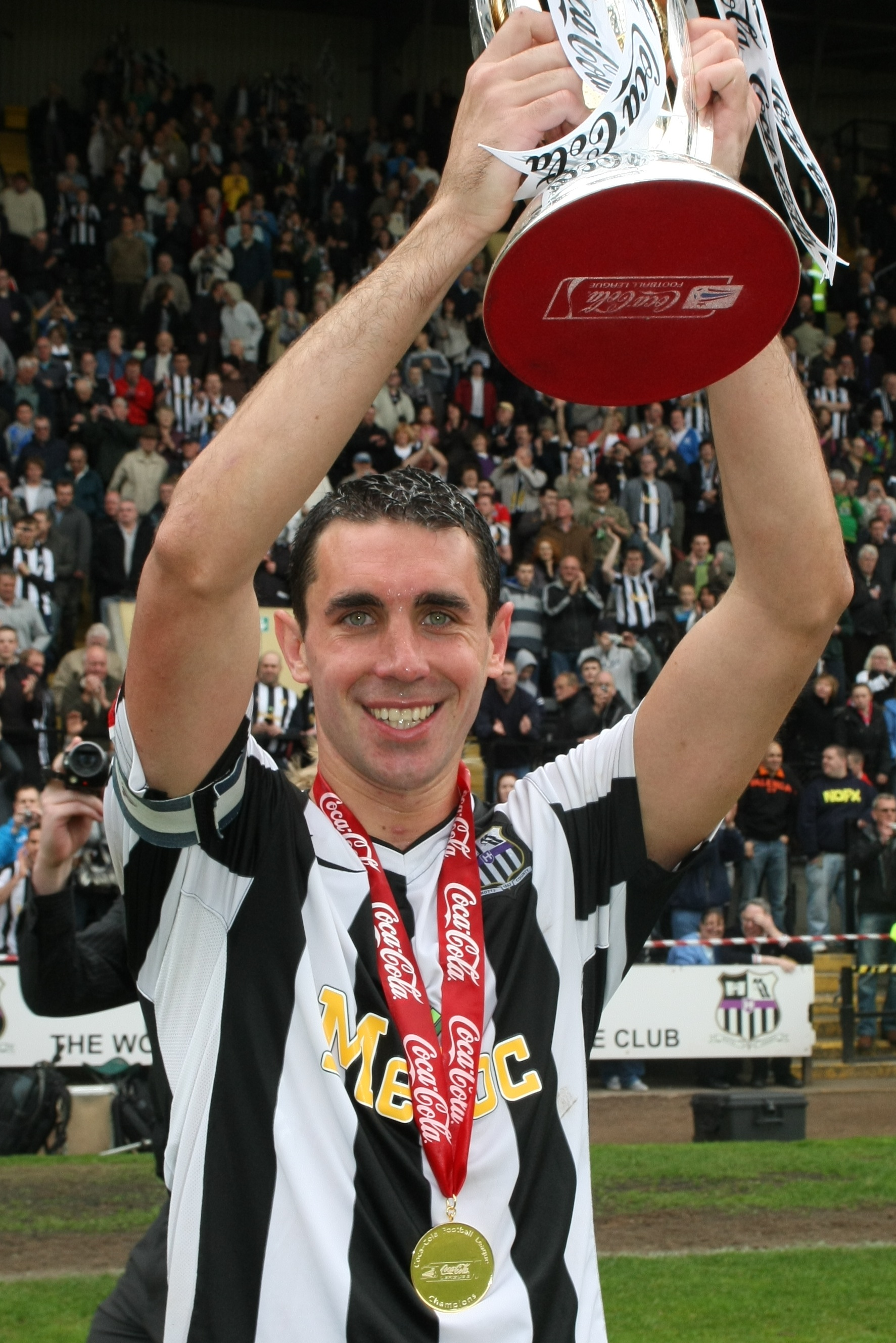
Notts captain John Thompson with the 2010 League Two championship trophy

Notts County has won two cup competitions in its history: the FA Cup in the 1893–94 season and the Anglo-Italian Cup in the 1994–95 season. Notts have won eight league titles in total; they have been second-tier champions three times, third-tier champions twice, and fourth-tier champions three times. Their most recent championship was the League Two title won in the 2009–10 season. Notts have won seven other promotions, most recently by beating Salford City in the 2026 League Two play-off final.

League

- Second Division (level 2)
  - Champions: 1896–97, 1913–14, 1922–23
  - Runners-up: 1894–95, 1980–81
  - Play-off winners: 1991
- Third Division South / Third Division (level 3)
  - Champions: 1930–31, 1949–50
  - Runners-up: 1972–73
  - Play-off winners: 1990
- Fourth Division / Third Division / League Two (level 4)
  - Champions: 1970–71, 1997–98, 2009–10
  - Runners-up: 1959–60
  - Play-off winners: 2026
- National League (level 5)
  - Play-off winners: 2023 (Note: Finished second in National League, promoted by beating Chesterfield 4–3 in a penalty shootout after a 2–2 draw in the 2023 National League play-off final.)

Cup

- FA Cup
  - Winners: 1893–94
  - Runners-up: 1890–91
- Anglo-Italian Cup
  - Winners: 1994–95
  - Runners-up: 1993–94
- Anglo-Scottish Cup
  - Runners-up: 1980–81
- Notts Senior Cup
  - Winners: 1884–85, 1899–1900, 1900–01, 1902–03, 1910–11, 1911–12, 1924–25, 1928–29, 1933–34, 1934–35, 1935–36

== Bibliography ==
- Allardyce, Sam (2015). Big Sam: My Autobiography. London: Headline Publishing. ISBN 978-1-47223-267-0.
- Betts, Graham (2006). England: Player by Player. Swindon: Green Umbrella Publishing. ISBN 1-905009-63-1.
- Brown, Tony (1995). Notts County F.C: The Official History, 1862–1995. Harefield: Yore Publications. ISBN 1-874427-61-5.
- Conn, David (2004). The Beautiful Game? Searching for the Soul of Football. London: Yellow Jersey Press. ISBN 0-224-06435-5.
- Curry, Graham; Dunning, Eric (29 July 2015). "The 'origins of football debate' and the early development of the game in Nottinghamshire". Soccer & Society. 18 (7): 866–79. doi:10.1080/14660970.2015.1067801.
- Foss, Darrin (2013). Notts County FC and the Birth of Modern Football: The Early Years of the Oldest Professional Football Club in the World. Charleston, SC: CreateSpace Independent Publishing Platform. ISBN 9-781484-816837.
- Gibson, Alfred; Pickford, William (1905). Association Football and the Men Who Made It. Vol. 2. London: The Caxton Publishing Company.
- Hutton, Steve (2007). Sheffield Football Club: 150 Years of Football. Altrincham: At Heart Ltd. ISBN 978-1-84547-174-3.
- Lawson, John (1978). Forest: 1865–1978. Norwich: Euromedia Print. ISBN 0-903619-24-5.
- Lovejoy, Joe (2011). Goals, Glory and Greed: Twenty Years of the Premier League. Edinburgh: Mainstream Publishing. ISBN 9781845967680.
- McVay, David (1988). Notts County Football Club: The World's Oldest Football League Club. Manchester: Archive Publications. ISBN 0-948946-37-7.
- Metcalf, Mark (2013). The Origins of the Football League: The First Season 1888/89. Stroud: Amberley Publishing. ISBN 978-1-4456-1881-4.
- Porter, Chris (2019). Supporter Ownership in English Football: Class, Culture and Politics. Cham: Palgrave Macmillan. ISBN 978-3030054373.
- Robinson, Ben (2024). The Trillion Dollar Conman. London: Icon Books. ISBN 978-183773-142-8.
- Rollin, Glenda (1997). Rothmans Football Yearbook 1997–98. London: Headline Book Publishing. ISBN 0-7472-1930-3.
- Rollin, Glenda (1998). Rothmans Football Yearbook 1998–99. London: Headline Book Publishing. ISBN 0-7472-2125-1.
- Rollin, Glenda; Rollin, Jack (2004). Sky Sports Football Yearbook 2004–2005. London: Headline Book Publishing. ISBN 0-7553-1310-0.
- Warsop, Keith (1984). The Magpies: The Story of Notts County Football Club. Buckingham: Sporting and Leisure Press. ISBN 0-86023-214-X.
- Warsop, Keith; Brown, Tony (2007). The Definitive Notts County F.C.: The Oldest League Club in the World. Nottingham: Tony Brown. ISBN 978-1-899468-99-7.
- Williams, Barrie; Lawton, Jnr, Tommy (2010). Get in There! Tommy Lawton: My Friend, My Father. Kingston upon Thames: Vision Sports Publishing. ISBN 978-1907637-00-1.
