= Samuel Mathews =

Samuel Mathews or Matthews may refer to:

- Samuel Mathews (colonial Virginia governor) (1630–1660), colonial governor of Virginia
- Samuel Matthews (captain) (died 1657), Virginia planter, political figure, and the father of governor Samuel Mathews
- Sam Matthews (Samuel Lloyd Matthews, born 1997), English footballer
- Samuel Matthews (hermit) or the Dulwich Hermit (died 1802), London hermit known for his unresolved murder
- Sam Mathews, founder of esports organization Fnatic

== See also ==
- Governor Mathews (disambiguation)
