= 2017–18 Crystal Palace F.C. season =

English football club season

Crystal Palace
2017–18 season
- Chairman: Steve Parish
- Manager: Frank de Boer (until 11 September); Roy Hodgson (from 12 September)
- Stadium: Selhurst Park
- Premier League: 11th
- FA Cup: Third round
- EFL Cup: Fourth round
- Top goalscorer: Luka Milivojević (10)
- Highest home attendance: 25,840 v Manchester United (5 March 2018)
- Lowest home attendance: 6,607 v Huddersfield Town (19 September 2017)
- Average home league attendance: 25,063
- Biggest win: 5–0 v Leicester City, Premier League, 28 April 2018
- Biggest defeat: 0–5 v Manchester City, Premier League, 23 September 2017
Home colours	Away colours	Third colours
- All statistics correct as of 5 May 2018.

The 2017–18 season was Crystal Palace's fifth consecutive season in the Premier League (which at that point had become their longest spell in the top division of English football) and the 112th year in their history. That season, Crystal Palace participated in the Premier League, FA Cup and EFL Cup. Frank de Boer was appointed as manager of Palace before the season began, only to be sacked on 11 September 2017 after losing his first four Premier League games without scoring. Former England national team manager Roy Hodgson was confirmed as his replacement the next day. Palace finished in 11th place in the Premier League, and were knocked out of the FA Cup and Carabao Cup in the third and fourth rounds, respectively.

The season covered the period from 1 July 2017 to 30 June 2018.

== Review ==
=== Pre-season ===
Crystal Palace started the season with the newly appointed Frank de Boer as manager, following the close season resignation of Sam Allardyce. A number of players were released at the end of their contracts, including first-team players Fraizer Campbell, Mathieu Flamini and Joe Ledley. Steve Mandanda was sold back to Marseille after a single season with the club. Early July saw the arrival of Jaïro Riedewald on a permanent transfer from Ajax and Ruben Loftus-Cheek on loan from Chelsea. As a warm-up to the season, the team took part in the Asia Trophy in Hong Kong (where they won one game and lost one), and had friendlies against Metz and Schalke 04, both of which were drawn. A week before the season started, Timothy Fosu-Mensah was loaned in from Manchester United.

=== August ===
Crystal Palace opened the Premier League season at home to newly promoted Huddersfield Town, a game they lost 0–3. An away defeat to Liverpool and another home defeat, to Swansea City, saw pressure grow on Frank de Boer. The first win of the season came against Ipswich Town in the Carabao Cup. Transfer deadline-day saw the arrival of Mamadou Sakho from Liverpool, following a successful spell on loan at the end of the previous season.

=== September ===
Following a fourth consecutive league defeat to Burnley, and with the team still goalless in the competition, Palace sacked De Boer on 11 September, replacing him the next day with former England manager Roy Hodgson. The poor run of league form continued with another three defeats, to Southampton, Manchester City and Manchester United. The second round of the Carabao Cup saw the team exact revenge for their opening day defeat by beating Huddersfield Town. By the end of the month, Crystal Palace were four points adrift at the bottom of the Premier League table, with seven defeats and no goals scored.

=== October ===
After an international break at the start of the month, Crystal Palace finally won a game: defeating the reigning Premier League champions, Chelsea, at home by a score of 2–1. Palace took an early lead through an own-goal with Chelsea equalising soon after. Wilfried Zaha scored the winning goal on the stroke of half-time. The third round of the Carabao Cup saw Palace travel to play Championship team Bristol City. Despite opening the scoring, they ended up on the wrong end of a 4–1 defeat. The month finished with another away defeat, this time to Newcastle, and a 2–2 home draw with West Ham, with Zaha scoring an equaliser seven minutes into injury time at the end of the game.

=== November ===
An away defeat to Spurs started the month, but the turnaround in home form continued with a 2–2 draw with Everton and a 2–1 victory over Stoke. On 28 November, Crystal Palace travelled away to play rivals Brighton & Hove Albion, returning with their first away point of the season after a 0–0 draw. The match saw a significant number of Palace fans locked-out following allegations of crowd disturbances. The local police reported a number of weapons were recovered at the match, a claim they later admitted was false.

=== December ===
A second successive goalless away draw against West Bromwich Albion saw Crystal Palace move off the foot of the table for the first time in 11 games, though they returned there after another 2–2 home draw with AFC Bournemouth. During injury time at the end of this match, Palace were awarded a penalty. Despite Luka Milivojević scoring a penalty earlier in the match, striker Christian Benteke insisted on taking it and his weak effort was saved, leading to criticism from his manager and the press. A home match with Watford saw Palace's habit of scoring late goals continue, with Bakary Sako and James McArthur scoring goals in the 89th and 91st minutes respectively to overcome a third-minute goal by their opponents. The next match was far less stressful: Palace were comfortable 3–0 winners over Leicester City, the match marking both the first away goals and the first away win of the league campaign, and moved the team up to 14th in the table. A further away point was gained with a draw at Swansea, which extended an unbeaten streak to eight matches, Palace's best ever in the Premier League. This run came to an end with a 2–3 home defeat to Arsenal before the year finished with a hard-fought scoreless draw with Manchester City. This match marked the end of City's 18-match winning streak in the Premier League, but saw season-ending injuries to both Scott Dann and Jason Puncheon and a late penalty miss by Luka Milivojević.

=== January ===
The first game of the New Year saw Crystal Palace chalk-up their second away win of the season, against Southampton, with goals from James McArthur and Luka Milivojević overcoming an early goal from Shane Long for the hosts. In the third round of the FA Cup, Palace lost 2–1 to rivals Brighton, with former Eagle Glenn Murray scoring a late winner. Back in the league, the good run continued, with Bakary Sako scoring the only goal in the first half of the home game against Burnley. The next game saw an awful start by Palace, finding themselves four goals down within the first quarter of the away match against Arsenal. They staged a minor recovery, scoring the only goal in the second half to lose 4–1. Another local away match, this time against West Ham, ended in a 1–1 draw, with Christian Benteke scoring his second goal of the season to open the scoring before a penalty from Mark Noble evened the score just before half-time. During the transfer window, Crystal Palace bolstered their ranks with Polish defender Jarosław Jach and Norwegian striker Alexander Sørloth as permanent transfers and Swedish midfielder Erdal Rakip a loan-signing from Benfica. Squad-members Keshi Anderson and Freddie Ladapo left the club with Andre Coker and Sullay Kaikai loaned out.

== Competitions ==
=== Premier League ===
==== League table ====
Pos	Team	Pld	W	D	L	GF	GA	GD	Pts
9	Leicester City	38	12	11	15	56	60	−4	47
10	Newcastle United	38	12	8	18	39	47	−8	44
11	Crystal Palace	38	11	11	16	45	55	−10	44
12	Bournemouth	38	11	11	16	45	61	−16	44
13	West Ham United	38	10	12	16	48	68	−20	42

Source: Premier League
Rules for classification: 1) Points; 2) Goal difference; 3) Goals scored. 4) Play-offs (only if needed to decide champion, teams for relegation or teams for UEFA competitions).

==== Results summary ====
Overall								Home						Away					
Pld	W	D	L	GF	GA	GD	Pts	W	D	L	GF	GA	GD	W	D	L	GF	GA	GD
38	11	11	16	45	55	−10	44	7	5	7	29	27	+2	4	6	9	16	28	−12

Last updated: 13 May 2018.
Source: Premier League

==== Results by matchday ====
Matchday	1	2	3	4	5	6	7	8	9	10	11	12	13	14	15	16	17	18	19	20	21	22	23	24	25	26	27	28	29	30	31	32	33	34	35	36	37	38
Ground	H	A	H	A	H	A	A	H	A	H	A	H	H	A	A	H	H	A	A	H	H	A	H	A	A	H	A	H	H	A	A	H	A	H	A	H	A	H
Result	L	L	L	L	L	L	L	W	L	D	L	D	W	D	D	D	W	W	D	L	D	W	W	L	D	D	L	L	L	L	W	L	D	W	D	W	W	W
Position	19	19	19	20	20	20	20	20	20	20	20	20	20	20	18	20	18	14	16	16	17	14	12	13	13	14	15	17	18	18	16	17	17	16	14	11	11	11

Updated to match(es) played on 13 May 2018. Source: 11v11.com
A = Away; H = Home; W = Win; D = Draw; L = Loss
Notes: Positions in italics are weeks where not all teams had played the same number of games

==== Matches ====
Win Draw Loss

12 August 2017 1	Crystal Palace	0–3	Huddersfield Town	Selhurst
15:00 BST	Puncheon (yellow card) 88'	Report	Ward 23' (o.g.); Mounié 26', 78', (yellow card) 73'; Smith (yellow card) 28'; Palmer (yellow card) 60'	Stadium: Selhurst Park; Attendance: 25,448; Referee: Jon Moss

19 August 2017 2	Liverpool	1–0	Crystal Palace	Liverpool
15:00 BST	Henderson (yellow card) 69'; Mané 73'	Report	Puncheon (yellow card) 15'; Van Aanholt (yellow card) 63'; Benteke (yellow card) 90+2'	Stadium: Anfield; Attendance: 53,138; Referee: Kevin Friend

26 August 2017 3	Crystal Palace	0–2	Swansea City	Selhurst
15:00 BST	Benteke (yellow card) 10'; Ward (yellow card) 77'; Cabaye (yellow card) 79'; Puncheon (yellow card) 90+3'	Report	Abraham 44'; Ayew 48'; Fer (yellow card) 80'	Stadium: Selhurst Park; Attendance: 23,477; Referee: Andre Marriner

10 September 2017 4	Burnley	1–0	Crystal Palace	Burnley
13:30 BST	Wood 3'; Brady (yellow card) 34'	Report	Benteke (yellow card) 75'	Stadium: Turf Moor; Attendance: 18,862; Referee: Michael Oliver

16 September 2017 5	Crystal Palace	0–1	Southampton	Selhurst
12:30 BST	Cabaye (yellow card) 34'; Puncheon (yellow card) 50'; Ward (yellow card) 56'; McArthur (yellow card) 67'; Dann (yellow card) 82'	Report	Davis 6'; Long (yellow card) 77'	Stadium: Selhurst Park; Attendance: 24,199; Referee: Bobby Madley

23 September 2017 6	Manchester City	5–0	Crystal Palace	Manchester
15:00 BST	Mendy (yellow card) 25'; Sané 44', (yellow card) 75'; Sterling 51', 59'; Danilo (yellow card) 56'; Agüero 79'; Delph 89'	Report	Schlupp (yellow card) 76'	Stadium: City of Manchester Stadium; Attendance: 53,526; Referee: Neil Swarbrick

30 September 2017 7	Manchester United	4–0	Crystal Palace	Manchester
15:00 BST	Mata 3'; Fellaini 35', 49'; Lukaku 86'	Report		Stadium: Old Trafford; Attendance: 75,118; Referee: Mike Dean

14 October 2017 8	Crystal Palace	2–1	Chelsea	Selhurst
15:00 BST	Azpilicueta 11' (o.g.); Zaha 45'; Milivojević (yellow card) 71'; Dann (yellow card) 83'	Report	Bakayoko 18', (yellow card) 87'	Stadium: Selhurst Park; Attendance: 25,480; Referee: Andre Marriner

21 October 2017 9	Newcastle United	1–0	Crystal Palace	Newcastle upon Tyne
15:00 BST	Merino 86'; Lejeune (yellow card) 21'; Lascelles (yellow card) 29'; Manquillo (yellow card) 60'; Joselu (yellow card) 66'	Report	Cabaye (yellow card) 28'; Van Aanholt (yellow card) 29'	Stadium: St James' Park; Attendance: 52,251; Referee: Stuart Attwell

28 October 2017 10	Crystal Palace	2–2	West Ham United	Selhurst
15:00 BST	Milivojević 50' (pen.); Dann (yellow card) 84'; Zaha 90+7'	Report	Hernández 31'; Zabaleta (yellow card) 37'; Ayew 43'; Masuaku (yellow card) 85'	Stadium: Selhurst Park; Attendance: 25,242; Referee: Bobby Madley

5 November 2017 11	Tottenham Hotspur	1–0	Crystal Palace	Wembley
12:00 GMT	Son 64'	Report	Townsend (yellow card) 45+2'; Schlupp (yellow card) 56'	Stadium: Wembley Stadium; Attendance: 65,270; Referee: Kevin Friend

18 November 2017 12	Crystal Palace	2–2	Everton	Selhurst
15:00 GMT	McArthur 1'; Milivojević (yellow card) 32'; Zaha 35'; Sakho (yellow card) 61'	Report	Baines 6' (pen.); Niasse (yellow card) 36', (goal) 45+1'; Keane (yellow card) 44'; Davies (yellow card) 63'	Stadium: Selhurst Park; Attendance: 25,526; Referee: Anthony Taylor

25 November 2017 13	Crystal Palace	2–1	Stoke City	Selhurst
15:00 GMT	Loftus-Cheek 56'; Tomkins (yellow card) 84'; Sakho 90+2'	Report	Shaqiri 53'; Wimmer (yellow card) 63'	Stadium: Selhurst Park; Attendance: 23,723; Referee: Mike Dean

28 November 2017 14	Brighton & Hove Albion	0–0	Crystal Palace	Falmer
19:45 GMT	Izquierdo (yellow card) 48'; Dunk (yellow card) 65'	Report		Stadium: Falmer Stadium; Attendance: 29,889; Referee: Andre Marriner

2 December 2017 15	West Bromwich Albion	0–0	Crystal Palace	West Bromwich
15:00 GMT	Livermore (yellow card) 64'; Field (yellow card) 90+2'; Nyom (yellow card) 90+4'	Report	Ward (yellow card) 76'	Stadium: The Hawthorns; Attendance: 23,531; Referee: Michael Oliver

9 December 2017 16	Crystal Palace	2–2	AFC Bournemouth	Selhurst
15:00 GMT	Tomkins (yellow card) 30'; Milivojević (yellow card) 34', (goal) 41' (pen.); Dann 44'; Zaha (yellow card) 71'; McArthur (yellow card) 79'; Benteke (yellow card) 82'	Report	Defoe 10', 45+3'; Begović (yellow card) 40'; Cook (yellow card) 71'	Stadium: Selhurst Park; Attendance: 24,823; Referee: Kevin Friend

12 December 2017 17	Crystal Palace	2–1	Watford	Selhurst
20:00 GMT	Milivojević (yellow card) 63'; Van Aanholt (yellow card) 85'; Sako 89'; McArthur 90+1'	Report	Janmaat 3'; Cleverley (yellow card) 78' (yellow-red card) 87'; Prödl (yellow card) 80'; Pereyra (yellow card) 90+1'	Stadium: Selhurst Park; Attendance: 23,566; Referee: Lee Mason

16 December 2017 18	Leicester City	0–3	Crystal Palace	Leicester
12:30 GMT	Ndidi (yellow card) 52' (yellow-red card) 61'; Maguire (yellow card) 56'; Simpson (yellow card) 86'	Report	Benteke 19', (yellow card) 51'; Zaha 40'; Schlupp (yellow card) 67'; Sako 90+4'	Stadium: King Power Stadium; Attendance: 31,081; Referee: Martin Atkinson

23 December 2017 19	Swansea City	1–1	Crystal Palace	Swansea
15:00 GMT	J. Ayew 77'	Report	Milivojević 59' (pen.)	Stadium: Liberty Stadium; Attendance: 20,354; Referee: Craig Pawson

28 December 2017 20	Crystal Palace	2–3	Arsenal	Selhurst
20:00 GMT	Zaha (yellow card) 45+2'; Townsend 49'; Tomkins 89'	Report	Mustafi 25'; Chambers (yellow card) 29'; Sánchez 62', 66'	Stadium: Selhurst Park; Attendance: 25,762; Referee: Michael Oliver

31 December 2017 21	Crystal Palace	0–0	Manchester City	Selhurst
12:00 GMT	Dann (yellow card) 16'; Van Aanholt (yellow card) 48'; Cabaye (yellow card) 67'; Puncheon (yellow card) 90+2'; Kelly (yellow card) 90+2'	Report	Sané (yellow card) 45+6'; Agüero (yellow card) 79'; Touré (yellow card) 90'; Fernandinho (yellow card) 90+1'	Stadium: Selhurst Park; Attendance: 25,804; Referee: Jon Moss

2 January 2018 22	Southampton	1–2	Crystal Palace	Southampton
19:45 GMT	Long 17'	Report	Fosu-Mensah (yellow card) 57'; McArthur 69'; Milivojević 80'	Stadium: St Mary's Stadium; Attendance: 28,411; Referee: Stuart Attwell

13 January 2018 23	Crystal Palace	1–0	Burnley	Selhurst
15:00 GMT	Sako 21'	Report	Defour (yellow card) 42'; Bardsley (yellow card) 83'; Taylor (yellow card) 85'	Stadium: Selhurst Park; Attendance: 24,696; Referee: Michael Oliver

20 January 2018 24	Arsenal	4–1	Crystal Palace	Holloway
15:00 GMT	Monreal 6'; Iwobi 10'; Koscielny 13'; Lacazette 22'	Report	Milivojević 78'	Stadium: Emirates Stadium; Attendance: 59,386; Referee: Chris Kavanagh

30 January 2018 25	West Ham United	1–1	Crystal Palace	Stratford
19:45 GMT	Noble 43' (pen.); Byram (yellow card) 56'	Report	Milivojević (yellow card) 4'; Benteke 24'; Tomkins (yellow card) 45+5'; Townsend (yellow card) 69'	Stadium: London Stadium; Attendance: 56,911; Referee: Neil Swarbrick

4 February 2018 26	Crystal Palace	1–1	Newcastle United	Selhurst
14:15 GMT	Milivojević 55' (pen.); Fosu-Mensah (yellow card) 64'	Report	Diamé 22'; Dummett (yellow card) 57'	Stadium: Selhurst Park; Attendance: 25,746; Referee: Andre Marriner

10 February 2018 27	Everton	3–1	Crystal Palace	Liverpool
15:00 GMT	Sigurðsson 46'; Niasse 51'; Walcott (yellow card) 68'; Davies 75'	Report	Van Aanholt (yellow card) 54'; Milivojević 83' (pen.)	Stadium: Goodison Park; Attendance: 39,139; Referee: Jonathan Moss

25 February 2018 28	Crystal Palace	0–1	Tottenham Hotspur	Selhurst
12:00 GMT		Report	Dembélé (yellow card) 45+1'; Kane 88'	Stadium: Selhurst Park; Attendance: 25,287; Referee: Kevin Friend

5 March 2018 29	Crystal Palace	2–3	Manchester United	Selhurst
20:00 GMT	Townsend 11', (yellow card) 75'; Van Aanholt 48'	Report	McTominay (yellow card) 42'; Smalling 55'; Young (yellow card) 57'; Lukaku 76'; Matić 90+1', (yellow card) 90+2'	Stadium: Selhurst Park; Attendance: 25,840; Referee: Neil Swarbrick

10 March 2018 30	Chelsea	2–1	Crystal Palace	Fulham
17:30 GMT	Willian 25'; Kelly 32' (o.g.); Morata (yellow card) 86'	Report	Van Aanholt (yellow card) 59', (goal) 90'; Tomkins (yellow card) 86'	Stadium: Stamford Bridge; Attendance: 40,800; Referee: Anthony Taylor

17 March 2018 31	Huddersfield Town	0–2	Crystal Palace	Huddersfield
15:00 GMT	Hogg (yellow card) 70'; Mooy (yellow card) 78'; Schindler (yellow card) 82'	Report	Tomkins 23'; Cabaye (yellow card) 57'; Milivojević 68' (pen.); Wan-Bissaka (yellow card) 80'	Stadium: John Smith's Stadium; Attendance: 23,918; Referee: Mike Dean

31 March 2018 32	Crystal Palace	1–2	Liverpool	Selhurst
12:30 BST	Milivojević 13' (pen.); Benteke (yellow card) 38'; McArthur (yellow card) 45'	Report	Karius (yellow card) 12'; Mané (yellow card) 24', (goal) 49'; Salah 84'	Stadium: Selhurst Park; Attendance: 25,807; Referee: Neil Swarbrick

7 April 2018 33	AFC Bournemouth	2–2	Crystal Palace	Bournemouth
15:00 BST	Mousset 65'; Gosling (yellow card) 76'; Francis (yellow card) 82'; King 89'	Report	Milivojević 47'; Zaha 75'; Tomkins (yellow card) 90+3'; Cabaye (yellow card) 90+4'	Stadium: Dean Court; Referee: Jonathan Moss

14 April 2018 34	Crystal Palace	3–2	Brighton & Hove Albion	Selhurst
15:00 BST	Zaha 5', 24', (yellow card) 79'; Tomkins 14'; Milivojević (yellow card) 16'; Hennessey (yellow card) 89'	Report	Stephens (yellow card) 11'; Murray 18'; Izquierdo 34'; Kayal (yellow card) 90'	Stadium: Selhurst Park; Attendance: 24,656; Referee: Andre Marriner

21 April 2018 35	Watford	0–0	Crystal Palace	Watford
15:00 BST	Doucouré (yellow card) 29'; Mariappa (yellow card) 60'; Cathcart (yellow card) 89'	Report	Ward (yellow card) 21'; Van Aanholt (yellow card) 45'; Zaha (yellow card) 64'; Loftus-Cheek (yellow card) 78'; Tomkins (yellow card) 88'	Stadium: Vicarage Road; Attendance: 20,041; Referee: Chris Kavanaugh

28 April 2018 36	Crystal Palace	5–0	Leicester City	Selhurst
15:00 BST	Zaha 17'; McArthur 38'; Cabaye (yellow card) 53'; Loftus-Cheek 81'; Van Aanholt 84'; Benteke 90' (pen.)	Report	Albrighton (red card) 56'; Silva (yellow card) 77'	Stadium: Selhurst Park; Attendance: 25,750; Referee: Mike Dean

5 May 2018 37	Stoke City	1–2	Crystal Palace	Stoke-on-Trent
12:30 BST	Shaqiri 43', (yellow card) 89'; Bauer (yellow card) 63'; Johnson (yellow card) 64'; Ndiaye (yellow card) 64'; Pieters (yellow card) 85'	Report	Milivojević (yellow card) 54'; Tomkins (yellow card) 64'; McArthur 68'; Van Aanholt 86'	Stadium: bet365 Stadium; Attendance: 29,687; Referee: Martin Atkinson

13 May 2018 38	Crystal Palace	2–0	West Bromwich Albion	Selhurst
15:00 BST	Tomkins (yellow card) 48'; McArthur (yellow card) 68'; Zaha 70'; Van Aanholt 78'	Report	Brunt (yellow card) 45+2'; Dawson (yellow card) 55'; Gibbs (yellow card) 81'	Stadium: Selhurst Park; Attendance: 25,357; Referee: Jonathan Moss

=== FA Cup ===
In the FA Cup, Crystal Palace entered the competition in the third round and were drawn away to Brighton & Hove Albion.

8 January 2018 Third round	Brighton & Hove Albion	2–1	Crystal Palace	Falmer
19:45 GMT	Stephens 25'; Murray 87'	Report	Sako 69'	Stadium: Falmer Stadium; Attendance: 14,507; Referee: Andre Marriner

=== EFL Cup ===
Crystal Palace entered the competition in the second round where they were drawn against Ipswich Town. Another home tie was confirmed for the third round, against Huddersfield Town, but in the fourth round Palace were drawn away against Bristol City.

22 August 2017 Second round	Crystal Palace	2–1	Ipswich Town	Selhurst
19:30 BST	McArthur 76', 84'	Report	Downes (yellow card) 56'; Celina 90+1'	Stadium: Selhurst Park; Attendance: 9,837; Referee: Andy Davies

19 September 2017 Third round	Crystal Palace	1–0	Huddersfield Town	Selhurst
19:45 BST	Sako 13'; Tomkins (yellow card) 36'; Milivojević (yellow card) 60'; Sakho (yellow card) 69'	Report		Stadium: Selhurst Park; Attendance: 6,607; Referee: Lee Probert

24 October 2017 Fourth round	Bristol City	4–1	Crystal Palace	Asthon Gate
19:45 BST	Taylor 32'; Đurić 39'; Bryan 60'; O'Dowda 66'	Report	Sako 21'	Stadium: Ashton Gate Stadium; Attendance: 21,901; Referee: Tim Robinson

=== Pre-season ===
Crystal Palace had five pre-season friendlies against Maidstone United, Liverpool and West Bromwich Albion (2017 Premier League Asia Trophy), Metz and Schalke 04.

15 July 2017	Maidstone United	1–3	Crystal Palace	Maidstone
13:00 BST	Pigott 33'	Report	Mutch 15', 38'; Berkeley 70'	Stadium: Gallagher Stadium

19 July 2017 Asia Trophy	Liverpool	2–0	Crystal Palace	So Kon Po, Hong Kong
20:30 HKT	Solanke 61'; Grujić (yellow card) 68'; Origi 79'	Report	Dann (yellow card) 42'	Stadium: Hong Kong Stadium; Attendance: 39,273; Referee: Bobby Madley (England)

22 July 2017 Asia Trophy	West Bromwich Albion	0–2	Crystal Palace	So Kon Po, Hong Kong
19:00 HKT	Nyom (yellow card) 33'; Yacob (yellow card) 50'	Report	Milivojević 11'; Sako 43'	Stadium: Hong Kong Stadium; Attendance: 40,000; Referee: Chiu-Kok Ng (Hong Kong)

29 July 2017	Metz	1–1	Crystal Palace	Metz, France
15:00 CET	Niane 79'	Report	Zaha 56'	Stadium: Stade Saint-Symphorien

5 August 2017	Crystal Palace	1–1	Schalke 04	Selhurst
15:00 BST	Benteke 61'	Report	Insua 43'	Stadium: Selhurst Park; Attendance: 12,683

== Players ==
=== First-team squad ===
Note: Flags indicate national team as defined under FIFA eligibility rules; some limited exceptions apply. Players may hold more than one non-FIFA nationality.

No.	Pos.	Nation	Player
1	GK	ARG	Julián Speroni
2	DF	ENG	Joel Ward
3	DF	NED	Patrick van Aanholt
4	MF	SRB	Luka Milivojević
5	DF	ENG	James Tomkins
6	DF	ENG	Scott Dann
7	MF	FRA	Yohan Cabaye
8	MF	ENG	Ruben Loftus-Cheek (on loan from Chelsea)
9	FW	NOR	Alexander Sørloth
10	MF	ENG	Andros Townsend
11	MF	CIV	Wilfried Zaha
12	DF	FRA	Mamadou Sakho
13	GK	WAL	Wayne Hennessey
14	MF	KOR	Lee Chung-yong
15	MF	GHA	Jeffrey Schlupp
16	GK	BRA	Diego Cavalieri
17	FW	BEL	Christian Benteke

No.	Pos.	Nation	Player
18	MF	SCO	James McArthur
21	FW	ENG	Connor Wickham
23	DF	SEN	Pape Souaré
24	DF	NED	Timothy Fosu-Mensah (on loan from Manchester United)
26	MF	MLI	Bakary Sako
27	DF	IRL	Damien Delaney
28	MF	BEL	Jason Lokilo
29	MF	ENG	Aaron Wan-Bissaka
30	GK	ENG	Dion-Curtis Henry
31	MF	SWE	Erdal Rakip (on loan from Benfica)
32	FW	ENG	Levi Lumeka
33	DF	POL	Jarosław Jach
34	DF	ENG	Martin Kelly
37	FW	ENG	James Daly
42	MF	ENG	Jason Puncheon (club captain)
44	DF	NED	Jaïro Riedewald

== Player statistics ==
=== Appearances and goals ===
As of 13 May 2018

No.	Pos	Nat	Player	Total		Premier League		FA Cup		League Cup	
No.	Pos	Nat	Player	Apps	Goals	Apps	Goals	Apps	Goals	Apps	Goals
Goalkeepers
1	GK	(Argentina) ARG	Julián Speroni	13	0	11	0	0	0	2	0
13	GK	(Wales) WAL	Wayne Hennessey	29	0	27	0	1	0	1	0
Defenders
2	DF	(England) ENG	Joel Ward	20	0	19	0	0	0	1	0
3	DF	(Netherlands) NED	Patrick van Aanholt	32	5	25+3	5	1	0	3	0
5	DF	(England) ENG	James Tomkins	30	3	27+1	3	0	0	2	0
6	DF	(England) ENG	Scott Dann	18	1	16+1	1	0	0	1	0
12	DF	(France) FRA	Mamadou Sakho	20	1	18+1	1	0	0	1	0
15	DF	(Ghana) GHA	Jeffrey Schlupp	27	0	21+3	0	1	0	2	0
23	DF	(Senegal) SEN	Pape Souaré	4	0	0+1	0	0+1	0	0+2	0
24	DF	(Netherlands) NED	Timothy Fosu-Mensah	23	0	17+3	0	1	0	1+1	0
27	DF	(Republic of Ireland) IRL	Damien Delaney	4	0	1+1	0	1	0	0+1	0
29	MF	(England) ENG	Aaron Wan-Bissaka	7	0	7	0	0	0	0	0
34	DF	(England) ENG	Martin Kelly	19	0	12+3	0	1	0	3	0
Midfielders
4	MF	(Serbia) SRB	Luka Milivojević	37	10	35+1	10	0	0	1	0
7	MF	(France) FRA	Yohan Cabaye	34	0	28+3	0	1	0	1+1	0
8	MF	(England) ENG	Ruben Loftus-Cheek	25	2	21+3	2	0	0	1	0
10	MF	(England) ENG	Andros Townsend	39	2	35+1	2	1	0	1+1	0
11	MF	(Ivory Coast) CIV	Wilfried Zaha	29	9	28+1	9	0	0	0	0
14	MF	(South Korea) KOR	Lee Chung-yong	10	0	1+6	0	0	0	2+1	0
18	MF	(Scotland) SCO	James McArthur	35	7	27+6	5	1	0	1	2
26	MF	(Mali) MLI	Bakary Sako	19	6	4+12	3	1	1	2	2
28	MF	(Belgium) BEL	Jason Lokilo	1	0	0	0	0	0	1	0
42	MF	(England) ENG	Jason Puncheon	12	0	6+4	0	0	0	2	0
44	MF	(Netherlands) NED	Jaïro Riedewald	15	0	4+8	0	1	0	2	0
Forwards
9	FW	(Norway) NOR	Alexander Sørloth	4	0	4	0	0	0	0	0
17	FW	(Belgium) BEL	Christian Benteke	31	3	24+7	3	0	0	0	0
32	FW	(England) ENG	Levi Lumeka	2	0	0+1	0	0	0	0+1	0
Players out on loan
25	MF	(England) ENG	Sullay Kaikai	4	0	0+1	0	0+1	0	2	0
Players transferred out during the season
19	FW	(England) ENG	Freddie Ladapo	2	0	0+1	0	0	0	0+1	0

=== Goalscorers ===
As of 13 May 2018

No.	Pos.	Name	Premier League	FA Cup	League Cup	Total
4	MF	Luka Milivojević	10	0	0	10
11	MF	Wilfried Zaha	9	0	0	9
18	MF	James McArthur	5	0	2	7
26	MF	Bakary Sako	3	1	2	6
3	DF	Patrick van Aanholt	5	0	0	5
5	DF	James Tomkins	3	0	0	3
17	FW	Christian Benteke	3	0	0	3
10	MF	Andros Townsend	2	0	0	2
8	MF	Ruben Loftus-Cheek	2	0	0	2
12	DF	Mamadou Sakho	1	0	0	1
6	DF	Scott Dann	1	0	0	1
—		Own goal	1	0	0	1
Total			45	1	4	50

=== Disciplinary record ===
As of 5 May 2018

No.	Pos.	Name	Premier League		FA Cup		League Cup		Total	
No.	Pos.	Name	Booked	Sent off (straight red)	Booked	Sent off (straight red)	Booked	Sent off (straight red)	Booked	Sent off (straight red)
4	MF	Luka Milivojević	8	0	0	0	1	0	9	0
5	DF	James Tomkins	8	0	0	0	1	0	9	0
3	DF	Patrick van Aanholt	7	0	0	0	0	0	7	0
7	MF	Yohan Cabaye	7	0	0	0	0	0	7	0
17	FW	Christian Benteke	6	0	0	0	0	0	6	0
42	MF	Jason Puncheon	5	0	0	0	0	0	5	0
11	MF	Wilfried Zaha	5	0	0	0	0	0	5	0
18	MF	James McArthur	5	0	0	0	0	0	5	0
6	DF	Scott Dann	4	0	0	0	0	0	4	0
2	DF	Joel Ward	4	0	0	0	0	0	4	0
15	MF	Jeffrey Schlupp	3	0	0	0	0	0	3	0
10	MF	Andros Townsend	3	0	0	0	0	0	3	0
24	DF	Timothy Fosu-Mensah	2	0	0	0	0	0	2	0
12	DF	Mamadou Sakho	1	0	0	0	1	0	2	0
34	DF	Martin Kelly	1	0	0	0	0	0	1	0
44	DF	Jaïro Riedewald	0	0	1	0	0	0	1	0
29	DF	Aaron Wan-Bissaka	1	0	0	0	0	0	1	0
13	GK	Wayne Hennessey	1	0	0	0	0	0	1	0
8	MF	Ruben Loftus-Cheek	1	0	0	0	0	0	1	0
Total			72	0	1	0	3	0	76	0

== Transfers ==
=== Transfers in ===
Date from	Position	Nationality	Name	From	Fee	Ref.
24 July 2017	CB	(Netherlands)	Jaïro Riedewald	Ajax	£8,000,000	
4 August 2017	GK	(England)	Dion-Curtis Henry	Peterborough United	Free	
31 August 2017	CB	(France)	Mamadou Sakho	Liverpool	£26,000,000	
23 January 2018	DF	(Poland)	Jarosław Jach	Zagłębie Lubin	Undisclosed	
31 January 2018	FW	(Norway)	Alexander Sørloth	Midtjylland	Undisclosed	
2 March 2018	GK	(Brazil)	Diego Cavalieri	Fluminense	Free agent	

=== Transfers out ===
Date from	Position	Nationality	Name	To	Fee	Ref.
30 June 2017	FW	(England)	Corie Andrews	Free agent	Released	
30 June 2017	CF	(Ghana)	Kwesi Appiah	AFC Wimbledon	Released	(Note: Kwesi Appiah joined AFC Wimbledon following his release.)
30 June 2017	FW	(Belgium)	Jonathan Benteke	Omonia	Released	(Note: Jonathan Benteke joined Omonia following his release.)
30 June 2017	FW	(England)	Fraizer Campbell	Hull City	Released	(Note: Fraizer Campbell joined Hull City following his release.)
30 June 2017	CB	(England)	Luke Croll	Exeter City	Released	(Note: Luke Croll joined Exeter City following his release.)
30 June 2017	MF	(France)	Mathieu Flamini	Free agent	Released	
30 June 2017	DF	(England)	Zeki Fryers	Barnsley	Released	(Note: Zeki Fryers joined Barnsley following his release.)
30 June 2017	DF	(England)	Ryan King-Elliott	Free agent	Released	
30 June 2017	MF	(Wales)	Joe Ledley	Derby County	Released	(Note: Joe Ledley joined Derby County following his release.)
30 June 2017	MF	(England)	Randell Williams	Watford	Released	(Note: Randell Williams joined Watford following his release.)
30 June 2017	DF	(England)	Ben Wynter	Bromley	Released	
11 July 2017	GK	(France)	Steve Mandanda	Marseille	Undisclosed	
1 August 2017	DF	(England)	Callum Sturgess	Colchester United	Free	
31 August 2017	MF	(England)	Hiram Boateng	Exeter City	Free	
1 September 2017	GK	(Albania)	Kleton Perntreou	Welling United	Released	(Note: Kleton Perntreou joined Welling United following his release.)
12 January 2018	MF	(Afghanistan)	Noor Husin	Notts County	Undisclosed	
16 January 2018	FW	(England)	Keshi Anderson	Swindon Town	Undisclosed	
31 January 2018	FW	(England)	Freddie Ladapo	Southend United	Undisclosed	
9 March 2018	MF	(England)	Michael Phillips	Maidstone United	Free	

=== Loans in ===
Start date	Position	Nationality	Name	From	End date	Ref.
12 July 2017	CM	(England)	Ruben Loftus-Cheek	Chelsea	30 June 2018	
10 August 2017	DF	(Netherlands)	Timothy Fosu-Mensah	Manchester United	30 June 2018	
22 January 2018	MF	(Sweden)	Erdal Rakip	Benfica	End of season	

=== Loans out ===
Start date	Position	Nationality	Name	To	End date	Ref.
31 August 2017	SS	(England)	Keshi Anderson	Swindon Town	January 2018	
31 August 2017	CB	(England)	Ryan Inniss	Colchester United	30 June 2018	
31 August 2017	AM	(Wales)	Jonny Williams	Sunderland	30 June 2018	
26 January 2018	FW	(England)	Andre Coker	Maidstone United	30 June 2018	
26 January 2018	FW	(England)	Sullay Kaikai	Charlton Athletic	30 June 2018	
2 March 2018	MF	(England)	Jordon Mutch	Vancouver Whitecaps	31 December 2018	
