= 2021–22 Crawley Town F.C. season =

Crawley Town
2021–22 season
- Chairman: Ziya Eren
- Manager: John Yems (until 23 April 2022); Lewis Young (caretaker, from 23 April 2022)
- Stadium: Broadfield Stadium
- League Two: 12th
- FA Cup: First round (eliminated by Tranmere Rovers)
- EFL Cup: First round (eliminated by Gillingham)
- EFL Trophy: Group stage
- Top goalscorer: League: Kwesi Appiah (11); All: Kwesi Appiah (12)
- Highest home attendance: 3,572 (vs Sutton United, 16 October 2021)
- Lowest home attendance: 385 (vs Southampton U21, EFL Trophy, 9 November 2021)
Home colours	Away colours
- All statistics correct as of 19:47, 14 December 2021 (UTC).

The 2021–22 season is Crawley Town's 126th year in their history and seventh consecutive season in League Two. Along with the league, the club will also compete in the FA Cup, the EFL Cup and the EFL Trophy. The season covers the period from 1 July 2021 to 30 June 2022.

== Background and pre-season ==
=== Pre-season ===
Crawley Town announced they would play friendly matches against Walton Casuals, Horley Town, Burgess Hill Town, Three Bridges, Horsham, Southampton U23s, East Grinstead Town, West Ham United U23, Tottenham Hotspur U23 and Beckenham Town as part of their pre-season preparations. However, the scheduled fixture against Southampton U23s was later confirmed as cancelled.

Win	Draw	Loss

Date	Time	Opponent	Venue	Result F–A	Scorers	Attendance	Ref.
6 July 2021	19:45	Walton Casuals	Away	3–0	Trialist, Nichols (2, 1 pen.)		
10 July 2021	15:00	Horley Town	Away	6–1	Nadesan, o.g., Matthews, Trialist (Battle) (3)		
13 July 2021	19:30	Burgess Hill Town	Away	1–1	Hessenthaler 27'		
16 July 2021	19:00	Three Bridges	Away	1–0	Rodari 26'	350	
17 July 2021	15:00	Horsham	Away	5–0	Nichols 13', Powell 24', Matthews 45+1', Hessenthaler 60', Frost 73'	887	
24 July 2021	15:00	East Grinstead Town	Away	3–0	Ashford, Rodari, Trialist (Battle)		
26 July 2021	19:00	West Ham United U23	Home	2–1	Trialist (Francilette) 10', Ashford 83'	1,478	
31 July 2021	15:00	Tottenham Hotspur U23	Home	2–1	Nadesan, Rodari	1,449	
3 August 2021	19:00	Beckenham Town	Away	0–1	—		

== Review ==
=== August ===
Crawley's first match was away to the previous season's National League play-off winners, Hartlepool United which they lost 1–0 after a late winner from Gavan Holohan. The club then faced League One side Gillingham in the first round of the EFL Cup and the away side went ahead in the 3rd minute after Gerald Sithole scored in "controversial circumstances". Crawley equalised in the 55th minute when Sam Ashford tapped in from close range and after a Daniel Phillips volley put the visitors ahead for the second time in stoppage time, Archie Davies equalised for the hosts on the 90+7th minute to take the match to a penalty shoot-out. Crawley lost 10–9 in the penalty shoot-out, with Crawley scoring their first nine penalties of the shoot-out before a miss from Ludwig Francillette. The match against Harrogate Town on 14 August 2021 was postponed due positive cases of COVID-19 within the Harrogate Town squad.

=== April and May ===
Manager Yems was suspended indefinitely on 23 April 2022, amidst allegations of racial discrimination, and replaced on a caretaker basis by his assistant Lewis Young. Yems was later sacked on 6 May.

== Competitions ==
=== League Two ===
==== League table ====
Pos	Team	Pld	W	D	L	GF	GA	GD	Pts
9	Tranmere Rovers	46	21	12	13	53	40	+13	75
10	Salford City	46	19	13	14	60	46	+14	70
11	Newport County	46	19	12	15	67	58	+9	69
12	Crawley Town	46	17	10	19	56	66	−10	61
13	Leyton Orient	46	14	16	16	62	47	+15	58
14	Bradford City	46	14	16	16	53	55	−2	58
15	Colchester United	46	14	13	19	48	60	−12	55

Source: EFL Official Website
Rules for classification: 1) Points; 2) Goal difference; 3) Number of goals scored; 4) Head-to-head results; 5) Wins; 6) Away goals; 7) Penalty points (sec 9.5); 8) 12-point sending off offences

==== Matches ====
Crawley Town's fixtures were released on 24 June 2021.

Win	Draw	Loss

Date	Time	Opponent	Venue	Result F–A	Scorers	Attendance	League position	Ref.
7 August 2021	15:00	Hartlepool United	Away	0–1	—	5,184	20th	
17 August 2021	19:45	Salford City	Home	2–1	Nadesan 38', Hessenthaler 75'	2,167	13th	
21 August 2021	15:00	Forest Green Rovers	Away	3–6	Hessenthaler 14', 30', Appiah 86'	1,922	19th	
28 August 2021	15:00	Northampton Town	Home	0–0	—	2,254	20th	
4 September 2021	15:00	Bristol Rovers	Away	0–1	—	6,513	22nd	
11 September 2021	15:00	Carlisle United	Home	2–1	Nichols 32', Tsaroulla 90'	2,151	19th	
18 September 2021	15:00	Colchester United	Away	1–0	Payne 22'	2,640	14th	
21 September 2021	19:45	Harrogate Town	Home	2–2	Lynch 42', Ashford 45+1'	1,791	12th	
25 September 2021	15:00	Bradford City	Home	2–1	Ferry 39', Tsaroulla 73'	2,435	8th	
2 October 2021	15:00	Tranmere Rovers	Away	1–2	Appiah 64'	6,046	14th	
9 October 2021	15:00	Rochdale	Away	1–0	Appiah 14'	2,268	9th	
16 October 2021	15:00	Sutton United	Home	0–1	—	3,572	12th	
19 October 2021	19:45	Exeter City	Home	1–3	Appiah 31'	1,960	14th	
23 October 2021	15:00	Scunthorpe United	Away	1–2	Appiah 73'	2,112	16th	
30 October 2021	15:00	Port Vale	Home	1–4	Appiah 44'	2,234	18th	
20 November 2021	15:00	Barrow	Away	1–0	Tilley 56'	3,429	18th	
23 November 2021	19:45	Newport County	Home	1–1	Appiah 55'	1,483	19th	
27 November 2021	15:00	Mansfield Town	Home	1–2	Tilley 48'	1,824	18th	
7 December 2021	19:45	Walsall	Away	1–1	Nichols 45+1'	3,609	18th	
11 December 2021	15:00	Leyton Orient	Away	2–1	Francomb 32', Appiah 66'	5,142	16th	
1 January 2022	15:00	Colchester United	Home	3–1	Nadesan (2) 15', 55', Lynch 37'	2,022	14th	
8 January 2022	15:00	Northampton Town	Away	1–0	Nichols 41'	4,714	11th	
15 January 2022	15:00	Carlisle United	Away	1–1	Nadesan 25'	4,350	11th	
18 January 2022	19:45	Stevenage	Away	1–2	Nichols 45+1'	1,942	12th	
22 January 2022	15:00	Tranmere Rovers	Home	0–1	—	2,803	14th	
29 January 2022	15:00	Bradford City	Away	2–1	Nichols 71', Craig 90+5'	14,623	13th	
1 February 2022	19:45	Swindon Town	Away	1–1	Powell 41' (pen.)	7,306	14th	
5 February 2022	15:00	Stevenage	Home	2–2	Nichols (2) 34', 46'	2,214	14th	
8 February 2022	15:00	Harrogate Town	Away	3–1	Oteh 48', Tsaroulla 79', Nichols 84'	1,785	12th	
12 February 2022	15:00	Hartlepool United	Home	0–1	—	2,228	12th	
26 February 2022	15:00	Forest Green Rovers	Home	2–1	Nadesan 24', Tunnicliffe 32'	2,086	13th	
1 March 2022	19:45	Oldham Athletic	Home	2–2	Nadesan (2) 58', 61'	1,927	12th	
5 March 2022	15:00	Scunthorpe United	Home	0–0	—	2,144	13th	
8 March 2022	19:45	Bristol Rovers	Home	1–2	Hessenthaler 69'	2,223	13th	
12 March 2022	15:00	Port Vale	Away	1–4	Smith 9' (o.g.)	5,131	13th	
15 March 2022	19:45	Exeter City	Away	1–2	Appiah 45+6'	4,042	15th	
19 March 2022	15:00	Swindon Town	Home	3–1	Appiah 29', Nichols 72', Hutchinson 90+1'	2,977	13th	
26 March 2022	15:00	Rochdale	Home	1–0	Nadesan 18'	2,164	12th	
29 March 2022	19:45	Salford City	Away	1–2	Nichols 82'	1,290	13th	
9 April 2022	15:00	Barrow	Home	1–0	Appiah 57'	2,081	12th	
15 April 2022	15:00	Newport County	Away	2–1	Nadesan 15', Francillette 21'	5,137	12th	
18 April 2022	15:00	Walsall	Home	1–0	Hutchinson 69'	2,258	12th	
23 April 2022	15:00	Mansfield Town	Away	0–2	—	5,022	12th	
27 April 2022	19:45	Sutton United	Away	0–3	—	3,109	12th	
30 April 2022	15:00	Leyton Orient	Home	0–2	—	3,372	12th	
7 May 2022	15:00	Oldham Athletic	Away	3–3	Francomb 39', Tilley 44', Oteh 69'	4,591	12th	

=== FA Cup ===
Crawley were drawn at home to Tranmere Rovers in the first round.

Win	Draw	Loss

Date	Round	Time	Opponent	Venue	Result F–A	Scorers	Attendance	Ref.
6 November 2021	First round	15:00	Tranmere Rovers	Home	0–1	—	1,765	

=== EFL Cup ===
Crawley were drawn at home to Gillingham in the first round.

Win	Draw	Loss

Date	Round	Time	Opponent	Venue	Result F–A	Scorers	Attendance	Ref.
10 August 2021	First round	19:30	Gillingham	Home	2–2 (9–10 p)	Ashford 55', Davies 90+7'	1,904	

=== EFL Trophy ===
Pos	Div	Team	Pld	W	PW	PL	L	GF	GA	GD	Pts	Qualification
1	L2	Leyton Orient	3	3	0	0	0	6	0	+6	9	Advance to Round 2
2	L1	Charlton Athletic	3	2	0	0	1	10	3	+7	6	Advance to Round 2
3	ACA	Southampton U21	3	1	0	0	2	5	5	0	3	
4	L2	Crawley Town	3	0	0	0	3	1	14	−13	0	

Source: EFL.com

Win	Draw	Loss

Date	Time	Opponent	Venue	Result F–A	Scorers	Attendance	Ref.
31 August 2021	19:00	Charlton Athletic	Away	1–6	Appiah 75' (pen.)	1,404	
5 October 2021	19:00	Leyton Orient	Home	0–4	—	810	
9 November 2021	19:00	Southampton U21	Home	0–4	—	385	

== Transfers ==
=== Transfers in ===
Date	Position	Name	Previous club (Note: Brackets around club names denote the player's contract with that club had expired before he joined Crawley)	Fee	Ref.
1 July 2021	DF	Owen Gallacher	(Burton Albion)	Free transfer	
1 July 2021	MF	Jack Payne	Eastleigh	Undisclosed	
1 July 2021	DF	Harry Ransom	(Millwall)	Free transfer	
5 August 2021	DF	Ludwig Francillette	(Newcastle United)	Free transfer	
16 August 2021	FW	Kwesi Appiah	(NorthEast United)	Free transfer	
4 September 2021	FW	Alex Battle	(Truro City)	Free transfer	
7 September 2021	DF	Joel Lynch	Free agent	—N/a	
21 September 2021	FW	Mark Marshall	(Northampton Town)	Free transfer	
2 October 2021	GK	Dion-Curtis Henry	Hampton & Richmond Borough	Free transfer	
5 October 2021	MF	Kaan Kevser-Junior	Free agent	—N/a	
7 January 2022	GK	Taylor Seymour	(Burgess Hill Town)	Free transfer	
3 February 2022	CF	Aramide Oteh	(Salford City)	Free transfer	
26 February 2022	FW	Ronan Silva	(Biggleswade Town)	Free transfer	

=== Loans in ===
Date	Position	Name	Club	Return	Ref.
16 July 2021	GK	Blondy Nna Noukeu	Stoke City	End of season	
3 August 2021	DF	Will Ferry	Southampton	End of season	
31 August 2021	MF	Amrit Bansal-McNulty	Queens Park Rangers	3 January 2022	
12 January 2022	CM	Caleb Watts	Southampton	End of season	
31 January 2022	RM	Amrit Bansal-McNulty	Queens Park Rangers	End of season	
31 January 2022	AM	Isaac Hutchinson	Derby County	End of season	

=== Transfers out ===
Date	Position	Name	Subsequent club (Note: Brackets around club names denote the player joined that club after his contract with Crawley expired)	Fee	Ref.
1 July 2021	MF	Tarryn Allarakhia	(Woking)	Released	
1 July 2021	DF	Josh Doherty	(Barnet)	Released	
1 July 2021	DF	Joe McNerney	(Woking)	Released	
1 July 2021	GK	Stuart Nelson	(Dorking Wanderers)	Released	
1 July 2021	DF	David Sesay	(Barnet)	Released	
1 July 2021	DF	Mark Wright		Released	
16 August 2021	DF	Lewis Young	Retired		
3 September 2021	MF	Josh Wright	(Billericay Town)	Mutual consent	
6 January 2022	DF	Tom Dallison	Colchester United	Undisclosed	
29 January 2022	CF	Sam Ashford	Ayr United	Free transfer	
2 April 2022	CM	Dannie Bulman	Retired		

=== Loans out ===
Date	Position	Name	Club	Return	Ref.
12 August 2021	DF	Emmanuel Adebowale	Havant & Waterlooville	End of season	
31 August 2021	MF	James Tilley	Dorking Wanderers	28 September 2021	
14 September 2021	DF	Harry Ransom	Dover Athletic	3 January 2022	
23 October 2021	FW	Ricky German	Dulwich Hamlet	January 2022	
5 November 2021	MF	Zaid Al-Hussaini	Chelmsford City	December 2021	
29 November 2021	MF	Rafiq Khaleel	Kings Langley	1 January 2022	
3 December 2021	FW	Alex Battle	East Grinstead Town	31 December 2021	
19 December 2021	MF	Szymon Kowalczyk	East Grinstead Town	January 2022	
1 February 2022	CF	Alex Battle	Truro City	End of season	
1 February 2022	AM	Rafiq Khaleel	Gosport Borough	End of season	
19 February 2022	RM	Reece Grego-Cox	Barnet	End of season	
22 February 2022	RM	Sam Matthews	Aldershot Town	24 March 2022	
4 March 2022	CF	Davide Rodari	Dorking Wanderers	End of season	
4 March 2022	FW	Ronan Silva	Eastleigh	End of the season	

== Appearances and goals ==
Numbers in parentheses denote appearances as substitute.
Players with names struck through and marked † left the club during the playing season.
Players with names in italics and marked * were on loan from another club for the whole of their season with Crawley.
Key to positions: GK – Goalkeeper; DF – Defender; MF – Midfielder; FW – Forward

Players included in matchday squads
No.	Pos.	Nat.	Name	League Two		FA Cup		EFL Cup		EFL Trophy		Total	
No.	Pos.	Nat.	Name	Apps	Goals	Apps	Goals	Apps	Goals	Apps	Goals	Apps	Goals
1	GK	ENG	Glenn Morris	46	0	1	0	0	0	0	0	47	0
2	DF	ENG	Archie Davies	19 (14)	0	1	0	0 (1)	1	2	0	22 (15)	1
3	DF	SCO	Owen Gallacher	1 (2)	0	0	0	0	0	2	0	3 (2)	0
4	MF	ENG	George Francomb	37 (1)	2	0	0	1	0	1	0	39 (1)	2
5	DF	ENG	Tony Craig	32 (3)	1	1	0	1	0	3	0	37 (3)	1
6	DF	ENG	~~Tom Dallison~~ †	11 (1)	0	1	0	1	0	3	0	16 (1)	0
7	FW	IRL	Reece Grego-Cox	2 (8)	0	0	0	0	0	0 (1)	0	2 (9)	0
8	MF	ENG	Jack Powell	37	1	1	0	0 (1)	0	3	0	41 (1)	1
9	FW	ENG	Tom Nichols	35 (4)	10	1	0	0	0	0	0	36 (4)	10
10	FW	ENG	Ashley Nadesan	30 (9)	9	1	0	1	0	1	0	33 (9)	9
11	MF	ENG	Tyler Frost	9 (5)	0	0 (1)	0	1	0	1 (2)	0	11 (8)	0
12	FW	ENG	Alex Battle	0 (1)	0	0	0	0	0	1	0	1 (1)	0
14	FW	ENG	James Tilley	23 (7)	3	0	0	0 (1)	0	2	0	25 (8)	3
15	DF	FRA	Ludwig Francillette	24 (2)	1	1	0	1	0	1	0	27 (2)	1
18	FW	IRL	Will Ferry *	27 (9)	1	0 (1)	0	1	0	0	0	28 (10)	1
19	DF	ENG	Jordan Tunnicliffe	17 (1)	1	0	0	0	0	0	0	17 (1)	1
20	MF	ENG	Sam Matthews	6 (2)	0	0	0	0	0	0 (1)	0	6 (3)	0
21	FW	GHA	Kwesi Appiah	17 (9)	11	1	0	0	0	0 (2)	1	18 (11)	12
23	FW	ENG	~~Sam Ashford~~ †	7 (5)	1	0	0	1	1	2	0	10 (5)	2
23	FW	ENG	Aramide Oteh	5 (3)	2	0	0	0	0	0	0	5 (3)	2
24	MF	AUS	Caleb Watts *	0 (1)	0	0	0	0	0	0	0	0 (1)	0
25	DF	CYP	Nick Tsaroulla	24 (3)	3	0	0	0	0	1	0	25 (3)	3
27	MF	MAR	Rafiq Khaleel	0	0	0	0	0	0	1	0	1	0
28	MF	ENG	Jack Payne	31 (4)	1	1	0	1	0	2	0	35 (4)	1
30	MF	ENG	Amrit Bansal-McNulty *	2 (2)	0	0 (1)	0	0	0	2	0	4 (3)	0
34	MF	ENG	Kaan Kevser-Junior	0	0	0	0	0	0	0 (1)	0	0 (1)	0
35	FW	SUI	Davide Rodari	0 (1)	0	0	0	0	0	1	0	1 (1)	0
37	DF	WAL	Joel Lynch	21 (3)	2	0	0	0	0	0	0	21 (3)	2
38	GK	ENG	Dion-Curtis Henry	0	0	0	0	0	0	1	0	1	0
39	MF	ENG	Jake Hessenthaler	31 (1)	4	1	0	1	0	0 (1)	0	32 (2)	4
40	GK	CMR	~~Blondy Nna Noukeu~~ *†	0	0	0	0	1	0	2	0	3	0
40	MF	ENG	Isaac Hutchinson *	11 (8)	2	0	0	0	0	0	0	11 (8)	2
45	MF	JAM	Mark Marshall	1 (17)	0	0	0	0	0	1 (1)	0	2 (18)	0
47	MF	ENG	Florian Kastrati	0 (1)	0	0	0	0	0	0	0	0 (1)	0

Players not included in matchday squads
No.	Pos.	Nat.	Name
13	FW	GRN	Ricky German
16	DF	ENG	Harry Ransom
17	DF	ENG	~~Emmanuel Adebowale~~ †
22	MF	ENG	Zaid Al-Hussaini
26	MF	ENG	Szymon Kowalczyk
31	GK	ENG	Alfie Jones
32	FW	ENG	Mustafa Hussein
33	MF	ENG	Henry Burnett
42	GK	ENG	Taylor Seymour
