= Rafiq Khaleel =

English footballer

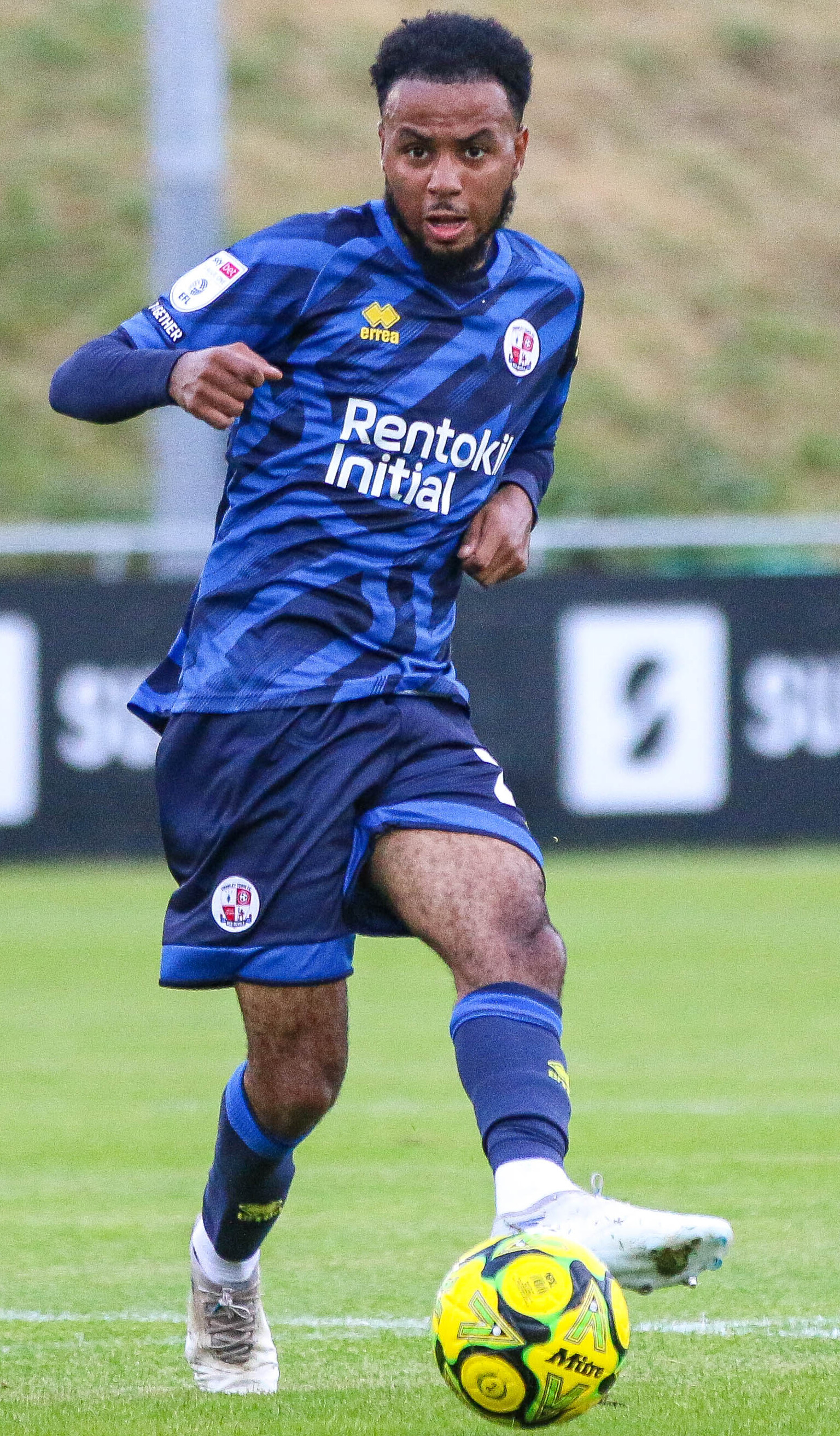

Personal information
- Full name: Rafiq Salah-Edine Khaleel
- Date of birth: 24 February 2003 (age 23)
- Place of birth: Camden, England
- Height: 5 ft 10 in (1.77 m)
- Position: Midfielder

Team information
- Current team: Dagenham & Redbridge
- Number: 28

Youth career
- –2020: Cheshunt

Senior career*
Years	Team	Apps	(Gls)
2020–2025	Crawley Town	23	(1)
2021	→ Kings Langley (loan)	2	(0)
2022	→ Gosport Borough (loan)	4	(0)
2025–	Dagenham & Redbridge	29	(2)
- * Club domestic league appearances and goals as of 10:48, 13 March 2026 (UTC)

Rafiq Salah-Edine Khaleel (born 24 February 2003) is an English professional footballer who plays as a midfielder for National League club Dagenham & Redbridge.

== Early and personal life ==
Khaleel was born in Camden, and is of Moroccan descent.

== Career ==
He played youth football for Camden Elite and Cheshunt. On 28 February 2020, Khaleel signed for League Two club Crawley Town on a two-and-a-half-year deal. He made his debut for the club on 13 October 2020 as a second-half substitute for Samuel Matthews in a 2–1 EFL Trophy defeat to Arsenal U21, before making his full debut the following month in a 2–0 home victory over Ipswich Town, again in the EFL Trophy. He joined Premier League side West Ham United on a trial spell in April 2021.

In November 2021, he joined Southern League Premier Division South club Kings Langley on loan until January 2022. He made his debut as a 63rd-minute substitute in a 2–1 win over Hayes & Yeading on 27 November 2021. He made 2 appearances on loan at the club. On 1 February 2022, Khaleel joined Southern League Premier Division South side Gosport Borough on loan for the remainder of the 2021–22 season. He made his debut for the club as a substitute in their 1–0 win away to Hendon later that day.

On 30 December 2022, Khaleel made his first league appearance for Crawley as a substitute in a 3–1 defeat to Stevenage. He was given his first start for the club in the first match the following month by new manager Scott Lindsey in a 3–2 win over Salford City. He scored his first goal for the club on 21 March 2023 with an 82nd-minute equaliser in a 1–1 draw with Doncaster Rovers. After making 14 league appearances during the 2022–23 season, Khaleel signed a new two-year contract in June 2023.

On 3 February 2025, Khaleel transferred to National League club Dagenham & Redbridge for an undisclosed fee, having agreed an 18-month contract with the club.

== Career statistics ==
As of match played 10 March 2026

Appearances and goals by club, season and competition
Club	Season	League			FA Cup		EFL Cup		Other		Total	
Club	Season	Division	Apps	Goals	Apps	Goals	Apps	Goals	Apps	Goals	Apps	Goals
Crawley Town	2020–21	League Two	0	0	0	0	0	0	2 (Note: Appearance(s) in EFL Trophy)	0	2	0
Crawley Town	2021–22	League Two	0	0	0	0	0	0	1	0	1	0
Crawley Town	2022–23	League Two	14	1	0	0	0	0	3	0	17	1
Crawley Town	2023–24	League Two	8	0	1	0	1	0	4	1	14	1
Crawley Town	2024–25	League One	1	0	1	0	2	1	3	0	7	1
Crawley Town	Total		23	1	2	0	3	1	13	1	41	3
Kings Langley (loan)	2021–22	SL Premier Division South	2	0	—		—		—		2	0
Gosport Borough (loan)	2021–22	SL Premier Division South	4	0	—		—		—		4	0
Dagenham & Redbridge	2024–25	National League	10	1	—		—		—		10	1
Dagenham & Redbridge	2025–26	National League South	19	1	1	0	—		1 (Note: Appearance(s) in FA Trophy)	0	21	1
Dagenham & Redbridge	Total		29	2	1	0	—		1	0	31	2
Career total			58	3	3	0	3	1	14	1	78	5
