= Ludwig Francillette =

Guadeloupean footballer (born 1999)

Personal information
- Full name: Ludwig Georges Francillette
- Date of birth: 1 May 1999 (age 27)
- Place of birth: Basse-Terre, Guadeloupe
- Height: 1.93 m (6 ft 4 in)
- Position: Defender

Team information
- Current team: Oxford City

Youth career
- –2018: Dijon FCO
- 2018–2019: AS Quetigny
- 2019–2021: Newcastle United

Senior career*
Years	Team	Apps	(Gls)
2021–2023	Crawley Town	53	(2)
2023–2025	Eastleigh	77	(10)
2025–2026	Morecambe	24	(0)
2026–	Oxford City	0	(0)
- * Club domestic league appearances and goals as of 13:14, 1 July 2026 (UTC)

Ludwig Georges Francillette (born 1 May 1999) is a Guadeloupean professional footballer who plays as a defender for National League North club Oxford City.

== Club career ==
=== Newcastle United ===
Born in Basse-Terre, Guadeloupe, Francillette played youth football for Dijon FCO until he was released in 2018, and signed for sixth-tier side AS Quetigny, initially as a reserve team player before establishing himself in their first team. He was scouted by Newcastle United of the Premier League and signed for their under-23 side in summer 2019. He was released by the club in at the end of the 2020–21 season.

=== Crawley Town ===
On 5 August 2021, it was announced that Francillette had signed for EFL League Two side Crawley Town on a two-year contract following periods on trial at both Crawley and Portsmouth. He made his debut for the club on 10 August 2021 in a 2–2 EFL Cup draw with Gillingham and was the only player to miss a penalty in a 10–9 shoot-out defeat. He made his league debut a week later in the club's 2–1 win over Salford City. He scored his first senior goal in Crawley's 2–1 win at Newport County on 15 April 2022 with a low strike following a "slick corner routine". Francillette made 29 appearances during the 2021–22 season.

=== Eastleigh ===
On 17 July 2023, Francillette signed for National League club Eastleigh. Across two seasons, he scored 12 goals in 86 games for the club.

=== Morecambe ===
On 21 August 2025, Francillette signed for Morecambe. On 16 May 2026, Morecambe announced he was being released.

=== Oxford City ===
On 30 June 2026, Francillette joined National League North club Oxford City.

== International career ==
Francillette has represented Guadeloupe at youth international level.

== Career statistics ==
As of end of 2024-25 season

Appearances and goals by club, season and competition
Club	Season	League			FA Cup		EFL Cup		Other		Total	
Club	Season	Division	Apps	Goals	Apps	Goals	Apps	Goals	Apps	Goals	Apps	Goals
Newcastle United U21	2019–20	—			—		—		2 (Note: Appearance(s) in EFL Trophy)	0	2	0
Newcastle United U21	2020–21	—			—		—		3	0	3	0
Newcastle United U21	Total		0	0	0	0	0	0	5	0	5	0
Crawley Town	2021–22	EFL League Two	26	1	1	0	1	0	1	0	29	1
Crawley Town	2022–23	EFL League Two	27	1	0	0	1	0	2	0	31	1
Crawley Town	Total		53	2	1	0	2	0	3	0	60	2
Eastleigh	2023–24	National League	34	2	5	2	—		1 (Note: Appearance(s) in FA Trophy)	0	40	4
Eastleigh	2024–25	National League	43	8	1	0	—		2	0	46	8
Eastleigh	Total		77	10	6	2	0	0	3	0	86	12
Morecambe	2025–26	National League	0	0	0	0	—		0	0	0	0
Career total			121	12	7	2	2	0	11	0	141	14
