= Blondy Nna Noukeu =

Cameroonian footballer

Personal information
- Full name: Blondy Rudolph Nna Noukeu
- Date of birth: 17 September 2001 (age 25)
- Place of birth: Douala, Cameroon
- Height: 1.95 m (6 ft 5 in)
- Position: Goalkeeper

Team information
- Current team: Boulogne
- Number: 16

Youth career
- –2019: Royal Excel Mouscron
- 2019–2021: Stoke City

Senior career*
Years	Team	Apps	(Gls)
2021–2024	Stoke City	0	(0)
2021–2022	→ Crawley Town (loan)	0	(0)
2022–2023	→ Southend United (loan)	13	(0)
2024–2026	Sunderland	0	(0)
2026–	Boulogne	21	(0)

International career^{‡}
2026–	Cameroon	2	(0)
- * Club domestic league appearances and goals as of 19 September 2026 ‡ National team caps and goals as of 29 September 2026

Blondy Rudolph Nna Noukeu (born 17 September 2001) is a Cameroonian professional footballer who plays as a goalkeeper for Ligue 2 club Boulogne and the Cameroon national team.

== Early and personal life ==
Noukeu was born in Douala, Cameroon, and grew up in Belgium and France. Noukeu holds both Belgian and French citizenship. He is the son of former professional footballer Patrice Noukeu and his mother was a handball player.

== Club career ==
=== Stoke City ===
Noukeu played youth football for Royal Excel Mouscron from under-8 to under-10 level and returned to their academy aged 13. In July 2019, he signed for English side Stoke City, initially joining their under-23 team. In February 2021, he signed a longer-term contract with the club. He joined Crawley Town on a season-long loan on 16 July 2021. He made his professional debut on 10 August 2021 in a EFL Cup match against Gillingham. He was recalled by Stoke on 1 January 2022 after making three cup appearances for Crawley.

On 24 September 2022, Noukeu joined Southend United on loan until January 2023, later extended by a further month to the end of February 2023. He was recalled by Stoke in March 2023. He was released by Stoke at the end of the 2023–24 season.

=== Sunderland ===
Following a successful trial, Noukeu signed a two-year contract with Sunderland on 2 August 2024. Having failed to break into the first-team picture, he was linked with loan moves to Belgian club STVV and English League One side Port Vale in November 2025.

=== Boulogne ===
Noukeu joined Ligue 2 side Boulogne in January 2026.

== International career ==
Having previously been called-up to the Cameroon under-23 team, he was called up to the senior Cameroon squad for the first time in September 2020.

On 24 September 2026, he made his debut in an AFCON qualifier against Comoros.

== Career statistics ==
=== Club ===
As of match played 19 September 2026

Appearances and goals by club, season and competition
Club	Season	League			National cup		League Cup		Other		Total	
Club	Season	Division	Apps	Goals	Apps	Goals	Apps	Goals	Apps	Goals	Apps	Goals
Stoke City	2021–22	Championship	0	0	0	0	0	0	—		0	0
Stoke City	2022–23	Championship	0	0	0	0	0	0	—		0	0
Stoke City	2023–24	Championship	0	0	0	0	0	0	—		0	0
Stoke City	Total		0	0	0	0	0	0	0	0	0	0
Crawley Town (loan)	2021–22	League Two	0	0	0	0	1	0	2 (Note: Appearances in EFL Trophy)	0	3	0
Southend United (loan)	2022–23	National League	13	0	0	0	—		—		13	0
Sunderland	2024–25	Championship	0	0	0	0	0	0	—		0	0
Boulogne	2025–26	Ligue 2	14	0	—		—		—		14	0
Boulogne	2026–27	Ligue 2	7	0	—		—		—		7	0
Boulogne	Total		21	0	—		—		—		21	0
Career total			34	0	0	0	1	0	2	0	37	0

=== International ===
As of match played 29 September 2026

Appearances and goals by national team and year
National team	Year	Apps	Goals
Cameroon	2026	2	0
Total		2	0
