= Amrit Bansal-McNulty =

English footballer

Personal information
- Full name: Amrit Padraig Singh Bansal-McNulty
- Date of birth: 16 March 2000 (age 26)
- Place of birth: Hackney, England
- Position: Midfielder

Team information
- Current team: Enfield Town

Youth career
- 2014–2019: Queens Park Rangers

Senior career*
Years	Team	Apps	(Gls)
2019–2022	Queens Park Rangers	0	(0)
2019	→ Torquay United (loan)	2	(0)
2020	→ Dartford (loan)	4	(1)
2020	→ Como (loan)	3	(0)
2021–2022	→ Crawley Town (loan)	4	(0)
2022	→ Crawley Town (loan)	0	(0)
2024–2026	Waltham Abbey	60	(10)
2026-	Enfield Town	0	(0)

International career^{‡}
2020	Northern Ireland U21	2	(0)
- * Club domestic league appearances and goals as of 10:19, 11 March 2026 (UTC) ‡ National team caps and goals as of 15:53, 25 November 2020 (UTC)

Amrit Padraig Singh Bansal-McNulty (born 16 March 2000) is a footballer who plays as a midfielder for Waltham Abbey. Born in England, he has represented Northern Ireland at youth international level.

== Club career ==
Bansal-McNulty joined Queens Park Rangers in August 2014. On 29 November 2019, he joined National League side Torquay United on loan until January. After returning to QPR, he went out on loan again in February, this time joining National League South side Dartford on a one-month deal. The move was later extended for another two months. The following season, he joined Serie C side Como on a season-long loan deal. On 3 October 2020, he made his professional debut, coming on as a substitute for Como in 1–0 win over Pistoiese 1921. In January 2021, he returned to Queens Park Rangers having made three appearances for the Italian side.

On 31 August 2021, he joined EFL League Two club Crawley Town on loan until 3 January 2022. In November 2021, he scored his first goal for the club in a 6–1 win over Lancing in the Sussex Senior Challenge Cup. He returned to Queens Park Rangers at the end of his loan in January 2021, having made 7 appearances for Crawley. On 31 January 2022, Bansal-McNulty rejoined Crawley Town on loan for the remainder of the 2021–22 season, but did not play following his return to Crawley.

On 10 August 2024, Bansal-McNulty signed for Waltham Abbey of the Isthmian League North Division.

== International career ==
On 5 October 2020, Bansal-McNulty received his first international call-up after being included in the Northern Ireland U21 squad for their European qualifiers. The following week, he made his debut, starting in a 2–1 Euro qualifier win over Ukraine U21.

== Career statistics ==
As of 12 January 2022

Appearances and goals by club, season and competition
Club	Season	League			National Cup		League Cup		Other		Total	
Club	Season	Division	Apps	Goals	Apps	Goals	Apps	Goals	Apps	Goals	Apps	Goals
Queens Park Rangers	2019–20	Championship	0	0	0	0	0	0	0	0	0	0
Queens Park Rangers	2020–21	Championship	0	0	0	0	0	0	0	0	0	0
Queens Park Rangers	2021–22	Championship	0	0	0	0	0	0	0	0	0	0
Queens Park Rangers	Total		0	0	0	0	0	0	0	0	0	0
Torquay United (loan)	2019–20	National League	2	0	0	0	—		1 (Note: Appearance(s) in the FA Trophy)	0	3	0
Dartford (loan)	2019–20	National League South	4	1	0	0	—		0	0	4	1
Como (loan)	2020–21	Serie C	3	0	0	0	—		0	0	3	0
Crawley Town (loan)	2021–22	League Two	4	0	1	0	0	0	3 (Note: 2 appearances in EFL Trophy, 1 in Sussex Senior Cup)	1	8	1
Career total			13	1	1	0	0	0	4	1	18	2

== Personal life ==
Born in England, Bansal-McNulty is of Irish and Indian descent. On 12 February 2026, he launched a case to sue his former clubs Queens Park Rangers and Crawley Town for more than £11 million. In May 2026, an employment tribunal upheld three claims of racial harassment against former Crawley Town manager John Yems, following Bansal-McNulty allegations that the club had failed to protect him from abuse, including derogatory comments about eating curry. Other claims against Crawley and against QPR were not upheld.
