= Dion-Curtis Henry =

English footballer

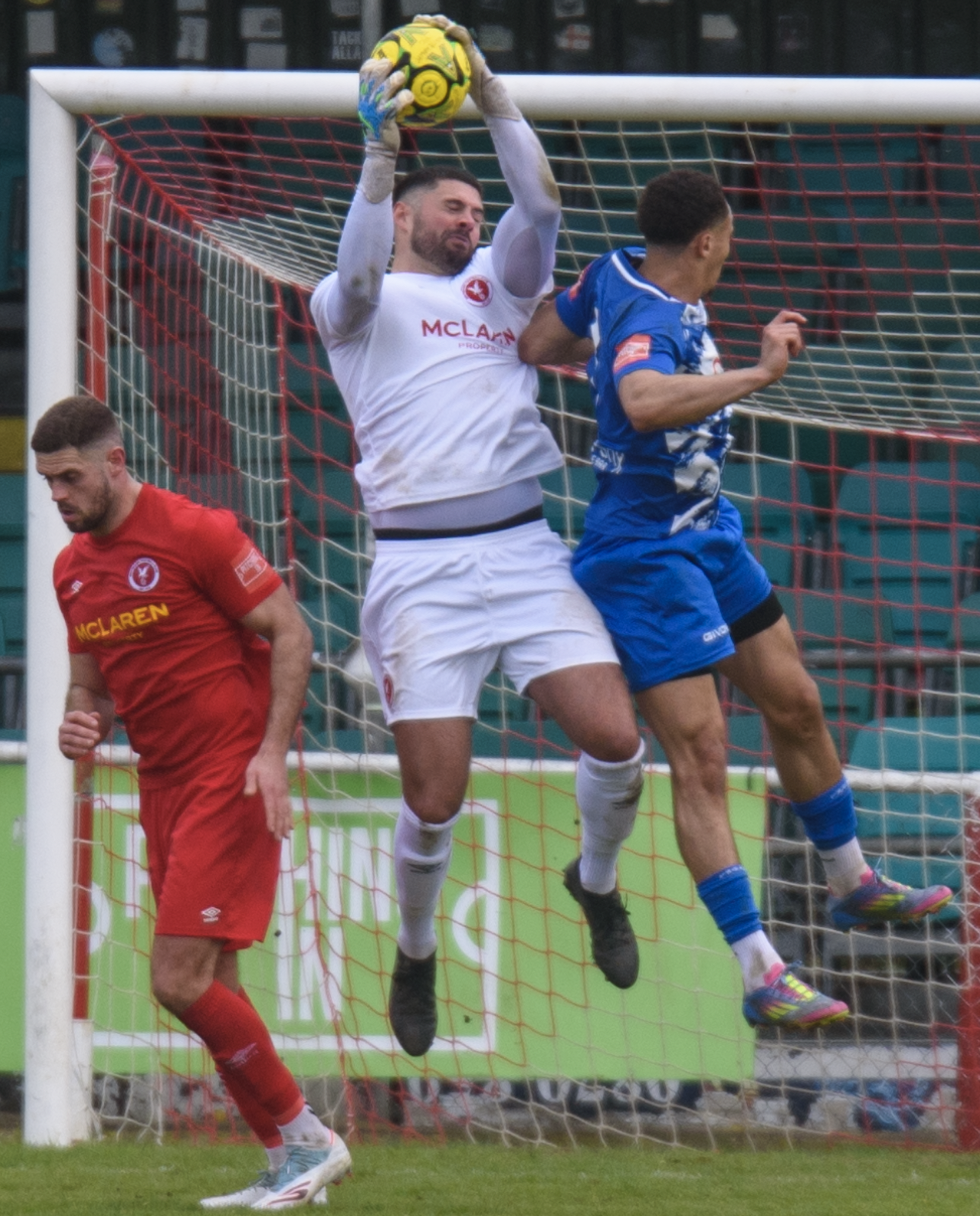

Personal information
- Full name: Dion-Curtis Henry
- Date of birth: 12 September 1997 (age 29)
- Place of birth: Ipswich, England
- Height: 6 ft 4 in (1.94 m)
- Position: Goalkeeper

Team information
- Current team: Whitehawk

Youth career
- 2012–2014: Peterborough United

Senior career*
| Years | Team | Apps | (Gls) |
| 2014–2017 | Peterborough United | 1 | (0) |
| 2016 | → Soham Town Rangers (loan) | 6 | (0) |
| 2016–2017 | → Boston United (loan) | 12 | (0) |
| 2017–2020 | Crystal Palace | 0 | (0) |
| 2019 | → Maidstone United (loan) | 6 | (0) |
| 2020 | → Hampton & Richmond Borough (loan) | 7 | (0) |
| 2020–2021 | Billericay Town | 11 | (0) |
| 2021–2023 | Crawley Town | 0 | (0) |
| 2023 | Brightlingsea Regent | 2 | (0) |
| 2023-2024 | Hornchurch | 18 | (0) |
| 2024 | Sutton Common Rovers | 2 | (0) |
| 2024 | Sittingbourne | 4 | (0) |
| 2024-2025 | Carshalton Athletic | 10 | (0) |
| 2025 | Brantham Athletic | 11 | (0) |
| 2025 | Welling United | 1 | (0) |
| 2025-2026 | Tilbury | 12 | (0) |
| 2026 | Hythe Town | 3 | (0) |
| 2026– | Whitehawk | 6 | (0) |
- * Club domestic league appearances and goals as of 20:56, 30April 2026 (UTC)

Dion-Curtis Henry (born 12 September 1997) is an English professional footballer who plays as a goalkeeper for Whitehawk.

== Club career ==
=== Peterborough United ===
Henry signed a two-and-a-half-year professional contract at League One club Peterborough United in March 2015, having been associated with the club from the age of 13. He was invited to a senior England goalkeeping training camp at St George's Park in April 2015.

He made his debut in the Football League on 3 October 2015, coming on for Ben Alnwick 30 minutes into a 5–3 victory over Millwall at London Road. After the match manager Graham Westley told the press that "There is cash on the table for Dion from a Premier League club. There has been interest in him from more than one Premier League club and he has been training elsewhere this week."

On 24 March 2016, Henry joined Isthmian League Division One North side Soham Town Rangers on a loan deal for the remainder of the 2015–16 campaign. Two days later, Henry made his debut in a 3–0 away defeat against Harlow Town. Henry went on to make five more appearances before returning to Peterborough at the end of the season.

On 31 August 2016, Henry joined National League North side Boston United on a youth loan until 1 January 2017. Four days later, Henry made his debut in a 3–2 defeat against FC United of Manchester.

=== Crystal Palace ===
Henry signed for Crystal Palace on 4 August 2017. He was an unused substitute for the first time against Chelsea on 14 October 2017.

In January 2019, Henry signed for Maidstone United of the National League, on loan until the end of the 2018–19 season.

In January 2020, Henry joined National League South club Hampton and Richmond Borough on loan until the end of the 2019–20 season.

In June 2020, Henry was released by Crystal Palace at the end of his contract.

=== Later career ===
In October 2020, Henry joined National League South side Billericay Town.

In October 2021, Henry joined Crawley Town on a one-month rolling contract. He joined Brightlingsea Regent in February 2023 having made one EFL Trophy appearance only for Crawley.

In August 2023, Henry signed for Hornchurch joining from Brightlingsea Regent.

At the start of the 24-25 season Henry played twice in the Isthmian League South Central Division for Sutton Common Rovers,before joining Sittingbourne in the Isthmian League South East Division followed by a switch to Carshalton Athletic in November.

In August 2025 Henry began the season playing for Brantham Athletic in Isthmian League North

In November 2025, Henry signed briefly for Welling United,before joining Tilbury later the same month.

In February 2026 Henry left Tilbury after making 12 league appearances, to sign for Hythe Town before joining Whitehawk the following month.

== Career statistics ==
As of match played 22 April 2019.

Appearances and goals by club, season and competition
| Club | Season | League | | | FA Cup | | League Cup | | Other | | Total | |
| Club | Season | Division | Apps | Goals | Apps | Goals | Apps | Goals | Apps | Goals | Apps | Goals |
|---|---|---|---|---|---|---|---|---|---|---|---|---|
| Peterborough United | 2015–16 | League One | 1 | 0 | 0 | 0 | 0 | 0 | 0 | 0 | 1 | 0 |
| Soham Town Rangers (loan) | 2015–16 | Isthmian League Division One North | 6 | 0 | 0 | 0 | — | | 0 | 0 | 6 | 0 |
| Boston United (loan) | 2016–17 | National League North | 6 | 0 | 0 | 0 | — | | 0 | 0 | 6 | 0 |
| Crystal Palace | 2017–18 | Premier League | 0 | 0 | 0 | 0 | 0 | 0 | 0 | 0 | 0 | 0 |
| Crystal Palace | 2018–19 | Premier League | 0 | 0 | 0 | 0 | 0 | 0 | 0 | 0 | 0 | 0 |
| Crystal Palace | Total | | 0 | 0 | 0 | 0 | 0 | 0 | 0 | 0 | 0 | 0 |
| Maidstone United (loan) | 2018–19 | National League | 6 | 0 | 0 | 0 | 0 | 0 | 0 | 0 | 6 | 0 |
| Hampton and Richmond Borough (loan) | 2018–19 | National League South | 7 | 0 | 0 | 0 | 0 | 0 | 0 | 0 | 7 | 0 |
| Billericay Town | 2020–21 | National League South | 11 | 0 | 0 | 0 | — | | 0 | 0 | 11 | 0 |
| Crawley Town | 2021–22 | League Two | 0 | 0 | 0 | 0 | 1 | 0 | 0 | 0 | 1 | 0 |
| Brightlingsea Regent | 2022–23 | Isthmian League | 2 | 0 | 0 | 0 | — | | 0 | 0 | 2 | 0 |
| Hornchurch | 2023–24 | Isthmian League | 18 | 0 | 0 | 0 | — | | 3 | 0 | 21 | 0 |
| Career total | | | 57 | 0 | 0 | 0 | 1 | 0 | 3 | 0 | 61 | 0 |

== Personal life ==
In July 2022, Henry appeared on an episode of MTV’s Catfish UK in a story involving AFC Sudbury. The club acknowledged the appearance on its official website.
