= James McArthur =

Scottish footballer (born 1987)

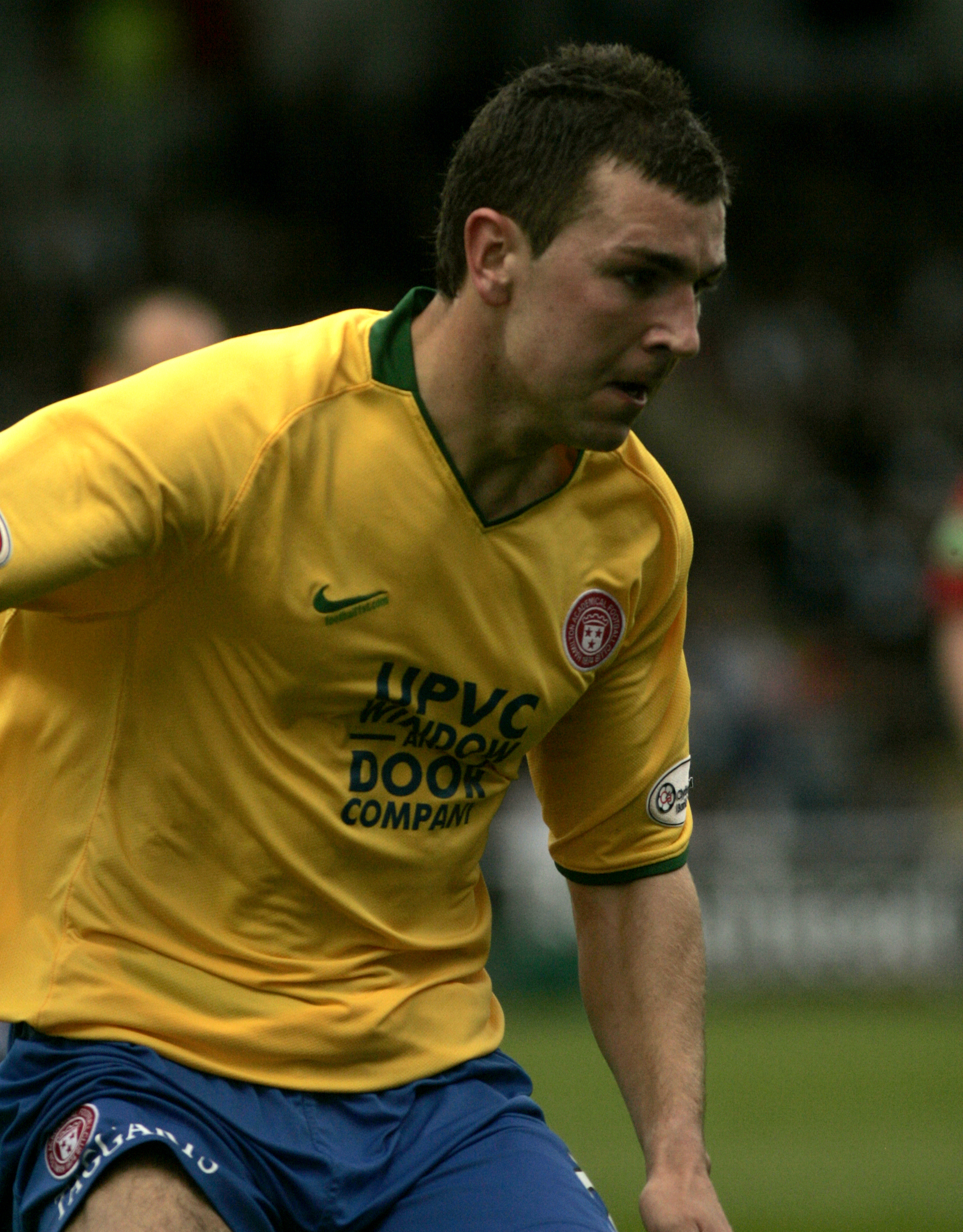
- McArthur playing for Hamilton Academical in 2009

Personal information
- Full name: James McFarlane McArthur
- Date of birth: 7 October 1987 (age 39)
- Place of birth: Glasgow, Scotland
- Height: 5 ft 10 in (1.78 m)
- Position: Central midfielder

Youth career
- Rangers South BC
- St Johnstone
- Rangers SABC
- Clyde
- 2003–2005: Hamilton Academical

Senior career*
| Years | Team | Apps | (Gls) |
| 2005–2010 | Hamilton Academical | 168 | (10) |
| 2010–2014 | Wigan Athletic | 129 | (11) |
| 2014–2023 | Crystal Palace | 240 | (17) |
| Total | | 537 | (38) |

International career
| 2008 | Scotland U21 | 2 | (0) |
| 2010–2017 | Scotland | 32 | (4) |
- * Club domestic league appearances and goals

James McFarlane McArthur (born 7 October 1987) is a Scottish former professional footballer who played as a central midfielder.

McArthur started his career at Hamilton Academical and was part of the team that won the 2007–08 Scottish First Division title. He made over 190 appearances for Hamilton before joining Wigan Athletic in July 2010. McArthur helped Wigan win the FA Cup in 2013, before being signed by Crystal Palace in the summer of 2014.

McArthur made 32 international appearances for the Scotland national team between 2010 and 2017.

== Club career ==
=== Hamilton Academical ===
Born in Glasgow and raised in the city's Barrowfield district, McArthur attended Whitehill Secondary School and supported Rangers in his youth; he played for Rangers South BC (alongside future international colleagues Robert Snodgrass and Graham Dorrans), St Johnstone pro youth, Rangers SABC and Clyde before moving to Hamilton Academical as a youth in 2003. He made his professional debut in January 2005 against Ross County. He established himself in the Hamilton team the following season and scored his first goal in April 2006 against St Johnstone.

Such was his progress that he was given the captaincy for Hamilton against Aberdeen in February 2008 for a Scottish Cup tie and nominated for the First Division Player of the Year for the 2007–08 season. In May 2008 after helping his side to the Scottish First Division, McArthur was awarded with a new three-year contract. By the time he departed from New Douglas Park aged 22, he had played in nearly 200 matches for Accies.

=== Wigan Athletic ===
In the 2009–10 season, several English Championship and Premier League clubs, including Sheffield United, West Bromwich Albion, Leeds United and Sunderland, showed an interest in McArthur. On 5 April 2010, McArthur went on a three-day visit to Premier League club Wigan Athletic with a view to a permanent move in the summer. He signed a four-year contract at the DW Stadium on 23 July for a fee of around £500,000. The move reunited him with former Hamilton teammate James McCarthy, who had made the same move at the beginning of the 2009–10 season. On 31 January 2012, McArthur scored his first goal for Wigan in a 3–1 loss to Tottenham Hotspur, and followed it up two games later with a winning goal over Bolton Wanderers at the Reebok Stadium in a game which finished 2–1 to Wigan. McArthur extended his contract with Wigan in May 2012, with the new deal due to run until 2016. On 11 May 2013 McArthur won the FA Cup, playing the whole game in a 1–0 upset win against Manchester City. However, only three days later, Wigan were relegated from the Premier League following a 4–1 defeat against Arsenal.

Wigan rejected a first offer of £5 million from Leicester City for McArthur in August 2014, but then accepted a proposed valuation of nearly £7 million. A payment schedule was not agreed and the proposed transfer collapsed, with Leicester signing Esteban Cambiasso instead. On the last day of the summer 2014 transfer window, Wigan accepted a £7 million offer from Crystal Palace for McArthur.

=== Crystal Palace ===
On 1 September 2014, McArthur signed a three-year contract with Crystal Palace after joining from Wigan Athletic for an undisclosed fee; due to a clause in his Wigan contract, his former club Hamilton received a sell-on fee from the Crystal Palace transfer, which they used to invest in the youth system through which the player had emerged. McArthur scored his first goal for Palace on 13 December, in a 1–1 draw against Stoke City.

In February 2016, McArthur tore ankle ligaments in a 2–1 loss to AFC Bournemouth. He returned in time to take part in the 2016 FA Cup Final, which Crystal Palace lost 2–1 to Manchester United after extra time.

In May 2018, having helped his club to maintain top division status for the fifth consecutive season of his spell at Selhurst Park, McArthur was recognised by the Premier League for reaching 200 appearances in the competition. James McCarthy joined Palace in 2019, reuniting the duo as they resumed their midfield partnership for much of the next two seasons.

In June 2022, McArthur signed a contract extension keeping him at the club until the summer of 2023.

On 24 May 2023, Crystal Palace confirmed that he would leave the club upon the expiry of his contract, ending a nine-year long stay with the club.

On 7 August 2023, McArthur announced his retirement from professional football.

== International career ==
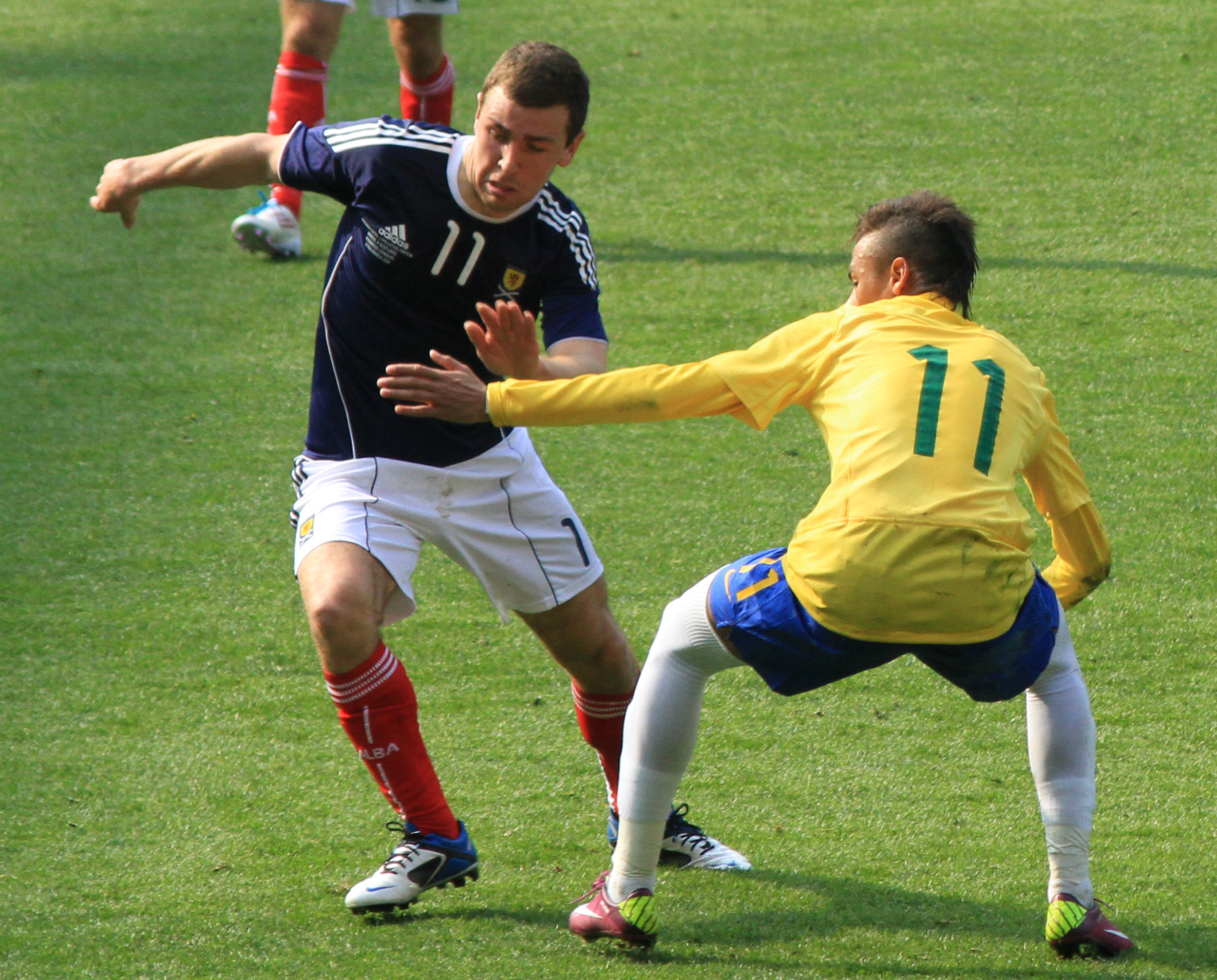
McArthur challenged by Neymar in a friendly match between Scotland and Brazil in March 2011

He was first called up to the Scotland under-21 squad in February 2008, and he made his debut at that level against Ukraine later that month.

On 16 November 2010, McArthur made his senior international debut as a second-half substitute for Charlie Adam against the Faroe Islands. He scored his first international goal on 9 February 2011, in a Nations Cup match against Northern Ireland.

As of August 2018, McArthur had made 32 international appearances and scored four goals. At this time he advised Scotland manager Alex McLeish that he wished to be excused from international games while he managed ongoing back problems. In October 2018, he announced his retirement from international football.

== Career statistics ==
=== Club ===
Appearances and goals by club, season and competition
| Club | Season | League | | | National cup (Note: Includes Scottish Cup, FA Cup) | | League cup (Note: Includes Scottish League Cup, Football League/EFL Cup) | | Europe | | Other | | Total | |
| Club | Season | Division | Apps | Goals | Apps | Goals | Apps | Goals | Apps | Goals | Apps | Goals | Apps | Goals |
|---|---|---|---|---|---|---|---|---|---|---|---|---|---|---|
| Hamilton Academical | 2004–05 | Scottish First Division | 6 | 0 | 0 | 0 | 0 | 0 | — | | 0 | 0 | 6 | 0 |
| Hamilton Academical | 2005–06 | Scottish First Division | 20 | 1 | 5 | 0 | 2 | 0 | — | | 0 | 0 | 27 | 1 |
| Hamilton Academical | 2006–07 | Scottish First Division | 36 | 1 | 1 | 1 | 1 | 0 | — | | 1 (Note: Appearance in Scottish League Challenge Cup) | 0 | 39 | 2 |
| Hamilton Academical | 2007–08 | Scottish First Division | 34 | 5 | 3 | 0 | 4 | 1 | — | | 0 | 0 | 41 | 6 |
| Hamilton Academical | 2008–09 | Scottish Premier League | 37 | 2 | 1 | 0 | 3 | 0 | — | | — | | 41 | 2 |
| Hamilton Academical | 2009–10 | Scottish Premier League | 35 | 1 | 2 | 0 | 1 | 0 | — | | — | | 38 | 1 |
| Hamilton Academical | Total | | 168 | 10 | 12 | 1 | 11 | 1 | — | | 1 | 0 | 192 | 12 |
| Wigan Athletic | 2010–11 | Premier League | 18 | 0 | 3 | 0 | 3 | 0 | — | | — | | 24 | 0 |
| Wigan Athletic | 2011–12 | Premier League | 31 | 3 | 1 | 0 | 1 | 0 | — | | — | | 33 | 3 |
| Wigan Athletic | 2012–13 | Premier League | 34 | 3 | 5 | 1 | 1 | 0 | — | | — | | 40 | 4 |
| Wigan Athletic | 2013–14 | Championship | 41 | 4 | 5 | 0 | 0 | 0 | 5 (Note: Appearances in UEFA Europa League) | 0 | 3 (Note: One appearance in FA Community Shield, two appearances in Football League Championship play-offs) | 0 | 54 | 4 |
| Wigan Athletic | 2014–15 | Championship | 5 | 1 | — | | — | | — | | 0 | 0 | 5 | 1 |
| Wigan Athletic | Total | | 129 | 11 | 14 | 1 | 5 | 0 | 5 | 0 | 3 | 0 | 156 | 12 |
| Crystal Palace | 2014–15 | Premier League | 32 | 2 | 1 | 0 | 0 | 0 | — | | — | | 33 | 2 |
| Crystal Palace | 2015–16 | Premier League | 28 | 2 | 2 | 0 | 1 | 0 | — | | — | | 31 | 2 |
| Crystal Palace | 2016–17 | Premier League | 29 | 5 | 1 | 0 | 1 | 0 | — | | — | | 31 | 5 |
| Crystal Palace | 2017–18 | Premier League | 33 | 5 | 1 | 0 | 1 | 2 | — | | — | | 35 | 7 |
| Crystal Palace | 2018–19 | Premier League | 38 | 3 | 2 | 0 | 0 | 0 | — | | — | | 40 | 3 |
| Crystal Palace | 2019–20 | Premier League | 37 | 0 | 1 | 0 | 0 | 0 | — | | — | | 38 | 0 |
| Crystal Palace | 2020–21 | Premier League | 18 | 0 | 0 | 0 | 0 | 0 | — | | — | | 18 | 0 |
| Crystal Palace | 2021–22 | Premier League | 21 | 0 | 1 | 0 | 1 | 0 | — | | — | | 23 | 0 |
| Crystal Palace | 2022–23 | Premier League | 4 | 0 | 0 | 0 | 0 | 0 | — | | — | | 4 | 0 |
| Crystal Palace | Total | | 240 | 17 | 9 | 0 | 4 | 2 | — | | — | | 253 | 19 |
| Career totals | | | 537 | 38 | 35 | 2 | 20 | 3 | 5 | 0 | 4 | 0 | 601 | 43 |

=== International ===
Appearances and goals by national team and year
| National team | Year | Apps | Goals |
|---|---|---|---|
| Scotland | 2010 | 1 | 0 |
| Scotland | 2011 | 4 | 1 |
| Scotland | 2012 | 3 | 0 |
| Scotland | 2013 | 7 | 0 |
| Scotland | 2014 | 2 | 0 |
| Scotland | 2015 | 5 | 1 |
| Scotland | 2016 | 5 | 1 |
| Scotland | 2017 | 2 | 1 |
| Total | | 29 | 4 |

Scotland score listed first, score column indicates score after each McArthur goal.

International goals scored by James McArthur
| No. | Date | Venue | Cap | Opponent | Score | Result | Competition |
|---|---|---|---|---|---|---|---|
| 1 | 9 February 2011 | Aviva Stadium, Dublin | 2 | Northern Ireland | 2–0 | 3–0 | 2011 Nations Cup |
| 2 | 7 September 2015 | Hampden Park, Glasgow | 21 | Germany | 2–2 | 2–3 | UEFA Euro 2016 qualification |
| 3 | 8 October 2016 | Hampden Park, Glasgow | 25 | Lithuania | 1–1 | 1–1 | 2018 FIFA World Cup qualification |
| 4 | 1 September 2017 | LFF Stadium, Vilnius | 29 | Lithuania | 3–0 | 3–0 | 2018 FIFA World Cup qualification |

== Honours ==
Hamilton Academical

- Scottish Football League First Division: 2007–08

Wigan Athletic

- FA Cup: 2012–13

Crystal Palace

- FA Cup runner-up: 2015–16
