= Samuel Matthews (hermit) =

UK reclusive widower (1730s - 1802)

Samuel Matthews (died 1802), better known as the Dulwich Hermit was an 18th-century London hermit. His murder in 1802 went unresolved.

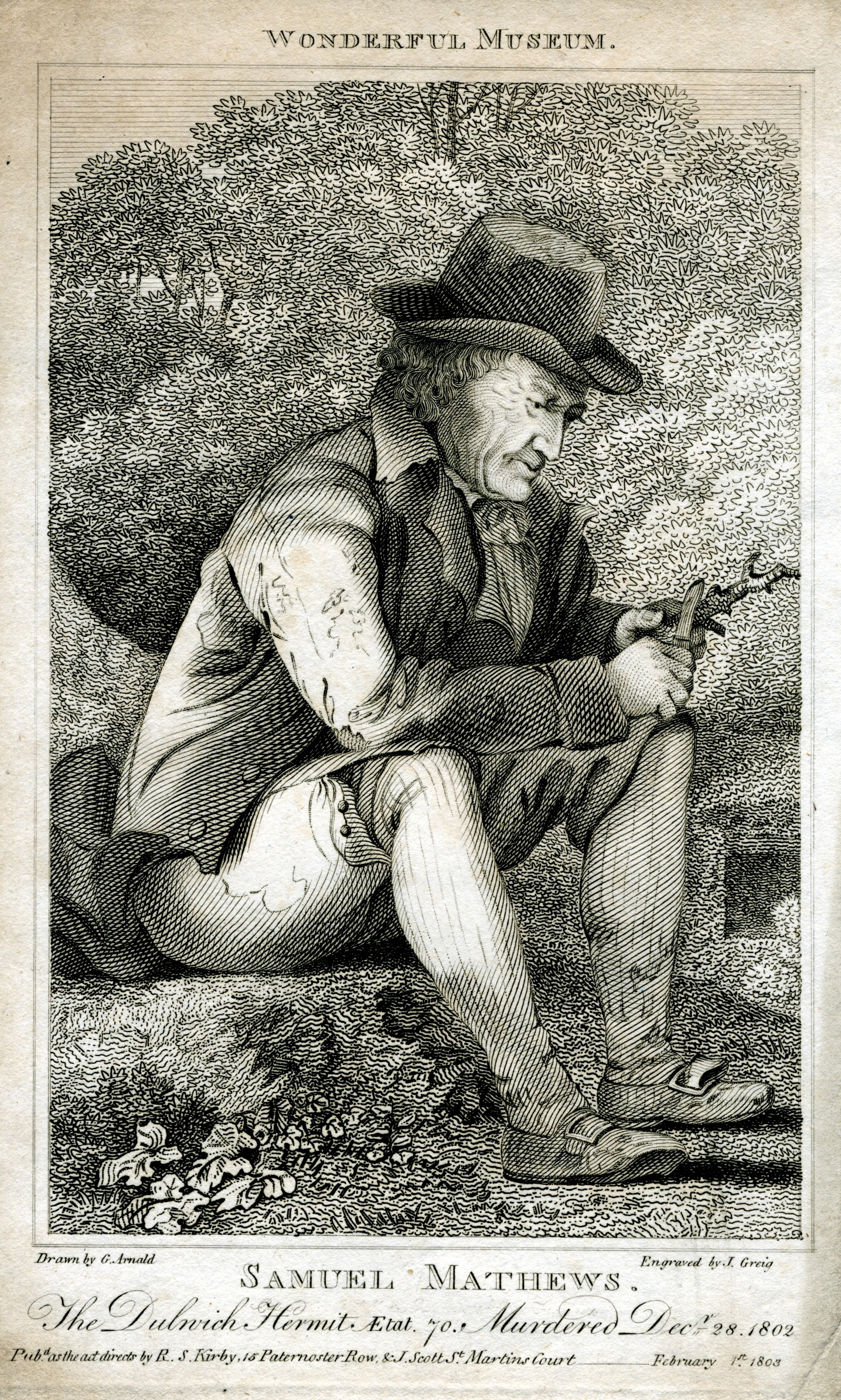
Engraving of Samuel Matthews, 1803. Based on a contemporary 1802 drawing of Matthews at his cave.

== Biography ==
Matthews was born in south Wales (Note: Other sources claim that Matthews was born in Shropshire) about 1733, (Note: Some contemporary sources described Matthews as having resolved to go into hermitage at 42, after his wife died in 1775, implying birthdate was 1732-1733. But other sources describe him as "nearly seventy years of age" upon his death, implying a birthdate of 1733-1734) and came to Dulwich in 1772, being employed as a gardener. He was described as having led a happy domestic life - living with his wife and four children.

Upon the death of his wife in about 1775, he is said to have entered a deep melancholy, withdrawing from civilization. He solicited and obtained permission from the master and wardens of Dulwich College to dig a cave in Dulwich Wood and erect a hut over it. He lived twenty-three years in this dwelling. He was visited regularly by locals, who dubbed him as the Wild Man of the Wood and described him as quiet, friendly and learned man - quite apart from his savage and dirty surroundings. He was often irritated by mischievous boys and fellows, who would steal his provisions and throw stones at him. At around 1798, he was beaten by some local Gypsy boys, who broke his arm and robbed him of 12 shillings. While recuperating, he became disgusted with his old habitation, and left to spend a year and a half with his son in Wales.

Once he had recovered, he felt an urge to return to Dulwich and once again, obtained permission to build a new hut and cave (his former residence having been destroyed by gypsies).

On an unknown day in December 1802, five boys, who at Christmas time, always made a tradition of visiting him, came across the mangled corpse of Matthews near his cave. He had been beaten to death. "[he] was covered with fern and under his arm was an oaken branch about six or seven feet long, which it is supposed the villains put into the cave in order to hook him out…it appears likely the hook had been hitched into his mouth, there being a hole of the size of it quite through the cheek" according to the local newspaper report.

Matthews had been seen the previous night by the local butcher, where he had paid off a small debt. Nearby gypsies were tried as suspects, but none were convicted, leading to the jury's verdict being "wilful murder, by person or persons unknown".
