= Governor Mathews =

Governor Mathews or Matthews may refer to:

- George Mathews (Georgia politician) (1739–1812), 16th Governor of Georgia
- Henry M. Mathews (1830s–1884), 5th Governor of West Virginia
- John Mathews (lawyer) (1744–1802), 33rd Governor of South Carolina
- Samuel Mathews (colonial Virginia governor) (1630–1660), Commonwealth Governor of Virginia from 1656 to 1660
- Claude Matthews (1845–1898), 23rd Governor of Indiana
- Joseph W. Matthews (1812–1862), 15th Governor of Mississippi

== See also ==
- Edward Mathew (1729–1805), Governor of Grenada from 1782 to c. 1797
