= John Yems =

English professional football manager

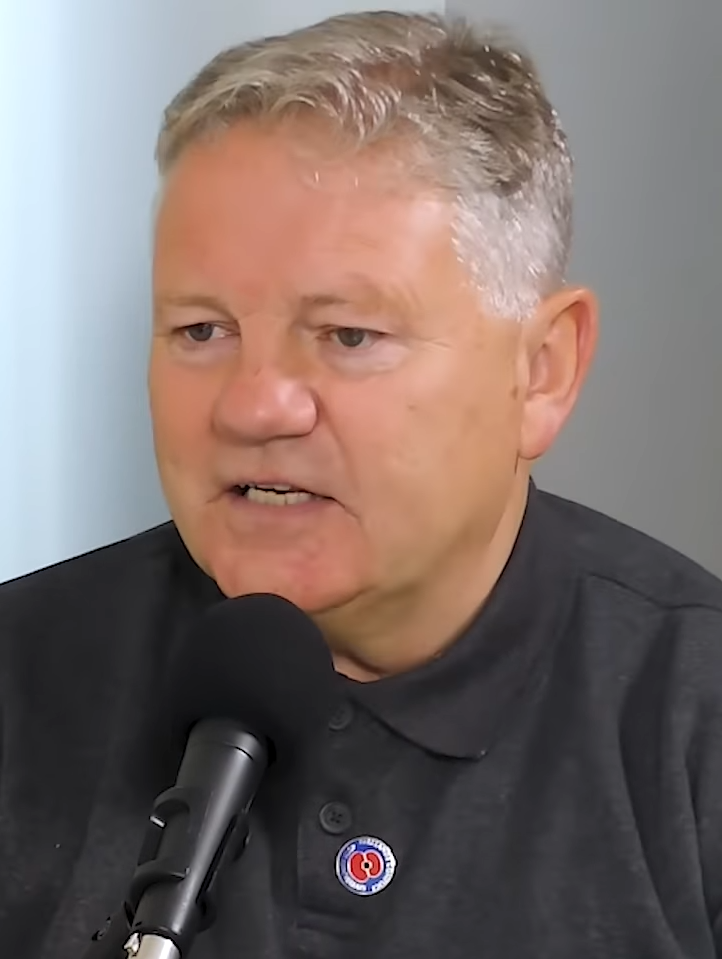
- Yems in 2023

Personal information
- Date of birth: 28 August 1959 (age 67)
- Place of birth: London, England

Youth career
- Crystal Palace
- Reading
- Millwall

Senior career*
Years	Team	Apps	(Gls)
1993–1994	Horsham		

Managerial career
- 1992–1994: Horsham
- 2006–2007: Crawley Town (caretaker)
- 2019–2022: Crawley Town
- * Club domestic league appearances and goals

John Yems (born 28 August 1959) is an English professional football manager, who was most recently manager of Crawley Town.

== Playing career ==
As a player, Yems was a member of the reserve teams of Crystal Palace, Reading and Millwall, before suffering a knee injury that forced him to retire. Due to an injury crisis, he played for Horsham at centre-back whilst manager of the club.

== Coaching career ==
Whilst coaching Fulham's youth team (YTS), Yems took up the manager role at Horsham in December 1992 after manager Peter Evans was sacked following a 1–0 defeat at home to Petersfield United. Whilst manager at Horsham, Yems chose to play himself for multiple matches due to an injury crisis. Yems left the club four matches from the end of the 1993–94 season. Yems had a spell coaching Dulwich Hamlet in the late 1990s.

Yems had coaching roles at Fulham and Millwall before, in 2006, he was appointed as one of three joint caretaker managers at Crawley Town following the sacking of John Hollins. Yems was sacked at the end of that season, and then joined Grays Athletic, initially as chief scout and becoming first team coach in October 2007. He left the club by mutual consent in January 2008. Yems was appointed as assistant manager at Exeter City in February 2008, but left in July 2009, since he lived in Sussex and did not wish to relocate. In October 2009, Yems took on a scouting role for Torquay United. Following a spell as a coach at Gillingham, Yems was appointed as football operations manager by Bournemouth in 2012, remaining until 2018, when the club stated that they could not afford to keep him.

On 5 December 2019, Yems was appointed as manager of League Two side Crawley Town, after some time acting as a scout for several teams, including Newcastle United. On 30 January 2020, he extended his contract at Crawley until the end of the 2022–23 season. After winning three and drawing four of Crawley's seven matches in December 2020, Yems was nominated for the EFL League Two Manager of the Month award for December 2020, but lost out to Derek Adams of Morecambe.

=== Racism case ===
On 23 April 2022, Yems was suspended by Crawley following "serious and credible accusations" that he used discriminatory language and behaviour towards his players. On 4 May 2022, The Football Association announced they were performing an investigation into Yems' conduct, after the Daily Mail published allegations from an unnamed player that Yems had used racial slurs towards black and Asian players, and that changing rooms in the training ground were racially segregated. The following day, the Professional Footballers' Association revealed that it had started an investigation, after seven current Crawley Town players contacted them with allegations of racist language and behaviour at the club. This meant that there were three separate investigations into Yems' behaviour ongoing; from Crawley Town themselves, the FA and the PFA. Yems denied the accusations. On 6 May 2022, Crawley Town confirmed that they had mutually agreed to part ways. On 28 July 2022, Yems was charged by the FA with racial discrimination, accused of making sixteen comments that had a reference to either ethnic origin, race, nationality, gender or colour between 2019 and 2022.

On 6 January 2023, Yems was found guilty of 12 charges by an independent regulatory commission and was banned from all football activity for 18 months. Four charges were not proven and a charge of enforcing racial segregation was dropped. Later that month, a report released by the FA stated that Yems used "offensive, racist and Islamophobic" language and joked that a Muslim player was a terrorist. Anti-racism charity Kick It Out declared Yems' verdict a "slap in the face to the victims" and stated they would be contacting the FA for an explanation of why the punishment was not more severe. Kick It Out also criticised the independent FA panel's judgement that it was not a case of "conscious racism". On 23 January, the FA announced that they would be appealing against the length of Yems' ban.

The FA appeal was successful and on 19 April 2023, Yems was suspended from all football and football-related activity up to and including 5 January 2026. This was the longest ever ban issued in English football for discrimination.

In May 2026, an employment tribunal upheld three claims of racial harassment against Yems, following allegations from former midfielder Amrit Bansal-McNulty that Crawley Town had failed to protect him from abuse, including derogatory comments about eating curry.

== Personal life ==
Yems lives in Horsham.

== Managerial statistics ==
As of 18 April 2022

Managerial record by team and tenure
Team	From	To	Record					Ref.
Team	From	To	P	W	D	L	Win %	Ref.
Crawley Town	5 December 2019	6 May 2022	119	43	32	44	36.1	
Total			119	43	32	44	36.1	
