= Kwesi Appiah =

Association football player (born 1990)

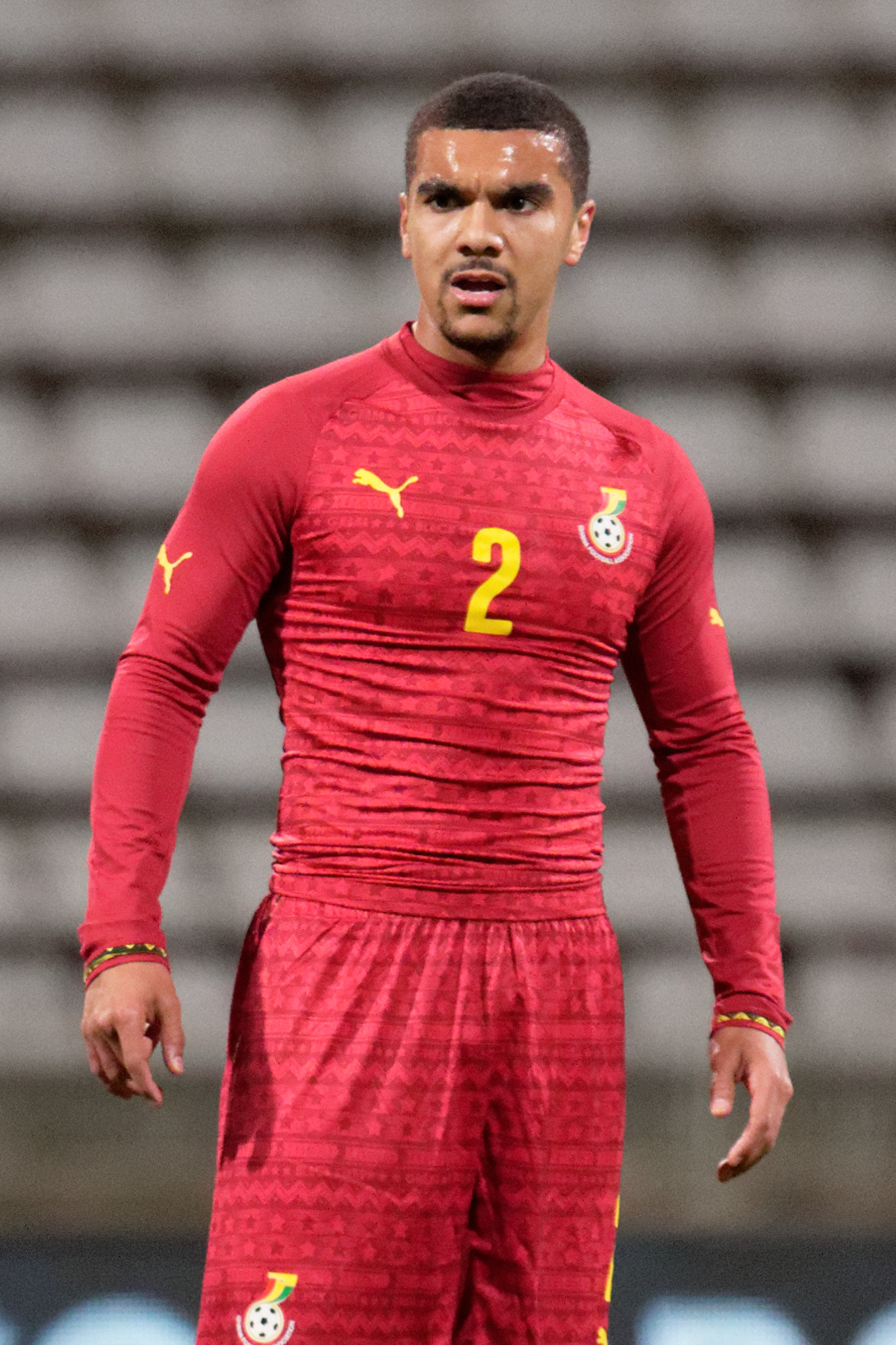
- Appiah playing for Ghana in 2015

Personal information
- Full name: Kwesi Appiah
- Date of birth: 12 August 1990 (age 36)
- Place of birth: Camberwell, England
- Height: 5 ft 11 in (1.80 m)
- Position: Striker

Team information
- Current team: Ebbsfleet United
- Number: 10

Youth career
- –2008: Ebbsfleet United

Senior career*
| Years | Team | Apps | (Gls) |
| 2008 | Ebbsfleet United | 3 | (1) |
| 2008–2010 | Peterborough United | 0 | (0) |
| 2009 | → Weymouth (loan) | 4 | (0) |
| 2009 | → King's Lynn (loan) | 10 | (9) |
| 2010 | → Kettering Town (loan) | 15 | (2) |
| 2010 | Brackley Town | 4 | (1) |
| 2010 | Thurrock | 2 | (0) |
| 2011–2012 | Margate | 24 | (22) |
| 2012–2017 | Crystal Palace | 6 | (0) |
| 2012 | → Aldershot Town (loan) | 2 | (0) |
| 2013 | → Yeovil Town (loan) | 5 | (0) |
| 2013 | → Cambridge United (loan) | 14 | (10) |
| 2014 | → Notts County (loan) | 7 | (0) |
| 2014 | → AFC Wimbledon (loan) | 7 | (3) |
| 2014–2015 | → Cambridge United (loan) | 19 | (6) |
| 2015 | → Reading (loan) | 6 | (1) |
| 2017 | → Viking (loan) | 12 | (3) |
| 2017–2020 | AFC Wimbledon | 59 | (11) |
| 2020–2021 | NorthEast United | 8 | (3) |
| 2021–2023 | Crawley Town | 30 | (11) |
| 2022–2023 | → Colchester United (loan) | 13 | (3) |
| 2023–2025 | Boreham Wood | 48 | (27) |
| 2025– | Ebbsfleet United | 0 | (0) |

International career^{‡}
| 2015–2019 | Ghana | 7 | (2) |
Medal record
Representing Ghana
Men's football
Africa Cup of Nations
| Runner-up | 2015 Equatorial Guinea |
- * Club domestic league appearances and goals as of 17:23, 13 March 2025 (UTC) ‡ National team caps and goals as of 27 March 2019

Kwesi Appiah (born 12 August 1990) is a professional footballer who plays as a striker for Ebbsfleet United. Born in England, he represents the Ghana national team.

== Club career ==
=== Ebbsfleet United ===
Appiah was born in Camberwell, Greater London, to a Ghanaian father and an English mother. He is a product of the Ebbsfleet United PASE youth system, and graduated to the first team in August 2008. He scored his first goal for the club with his first touch after coming on as a substitute against Woking on 20 September 2008. Appiah missed training in October and after leaving the ground, he failed to report back to the club.

=== Peterborough United ===
His disappearance was explained in October, when League One team Peterborough United announced the signing of Appiah, on a three-and-a-half-year deal. The matter was reported to The Football Association, as it was reported in breach of regulations. On 15 December it was reported that the FA had decided that the approach made for Appiah by Peterborough was "not proven" and so no ruling could be made.

Appiah was loaned out back to the Conference with Weymouth in February 2009 and made his debut in a 2–0 defeat to York City. He suffered from an ankle ligament injury that ruled him out of a game against Altrincham, but returned for the 5–0 defeat to Burton Albion. He returned to Peterborough on 20 March. He spent time at Northern Premier League Premier Division side King's Lynn in 2009, where he played 10 games scoring 9 goals, including a hat-trick against Durham City in an 11–0 win. Appiah's loan spell came to an abrupt end when the club was wound up in late-November 2009; this meant their record for 2009–10 was expunged. On 19 January 2010, he joined Kettering Town on a month-long loan.

=== Return to Non-League ===
Appiah joined Southern Football League Premier Division side Brackley Town for the 2010–11 season. Appiah then signed a two-year deal with Isthmian League Premier Division side Margate on 25 July 2011. After his great run of form this attracted a number of professional clubs and on 16 January 2012, he was linked with a move to Blackpool, when he claimed Margate had agreed to a deal with the Seasiders and stated that he was due to travel to Blackpool for talks with manager, but he later rejected the move as he preferred to move to London. Appiah left Margate having scored 35 goals in 34 games for the club.

=== Crystal Palace ===
On 31 January 2012, he agreed to his second professional deal to play for Crystal Palace. On 28 January 2013, Appiah joined Football League One side Yeovil Town on a month's loan deal. He made his first appearance for Yeovil in the 2–1 win over MK Dons, coming on in the second half as a substitute for Matthew Dolan.

Appiah returned to the Conference Premier on 13 September 2013 when he signed on a one-month loan deal for the then league leaders Cambridge United. Appiah scored his first Cambridge goal in a 3–0 win over Nuneaton Town on 24 September and followed it with the equaliser in a 1–1 draw away at Wrexham and the winner against Hereford United in the next two games. Having missed a penalty in a 0–0 stalemate against Chester, he atoned with both goals in the 2–0 win over Salisbury City that maintained Cambridge's six-point lead at the top of the Conference Premier on 19 October. Appiah had earlier confirmed the loan deal had been extended by a further month via his Twitter account. Appiah scored further goals against Aldershot Town, Barnet (2) and Macclesfield Town (2) in November, leading Cambridge manager Richard Money to express his eagerness to re-sign Appiah on loan in the January transfer window.

On 21 January 2014, Appiah joined Notts County on a one-month emergency loan.

On 27 March 2014, Appiah joined League Two side AFC Wimbledon on loan for the remainder of the 2013–14 season. He scored his first goal in a 2–2 draw with Newport County.

On 9 July 2014, Appiah rejoined Cambridge United on a six-month loan. Since his last stint at Cambridge, the club had regained their place in the Football League. He scored six league goals in nineteen league appearances but also scored the winner in the first round of the FA Cup against League One Fleetwood Town and a late equaliser against Mansfield Town in the second round – playing a large role in maintaining a run to the fourth round and two lucrative ties against Manchester United.

On 26 March 2015, Appiah joined Reading on loan until the end of the 2014–15 season. Appiah then injured his anterior cruciate ligament on 7 June 2015, while training for the Ghana national side As of 26 January 2016, it was reported that he had made enough progress to soon restart light training.

On 29 March 2017, it was announced that Appiah had joined Norwegian Eliteserien club Viking on loan until the end of June.

=== AFC Wimbledon ===
He re-signed for League One side AFC Wimbledon, this time on a permanent basis, on 31 May 2017. He scored his first goal for Wimbledon in a 2–0 win against Doncaster Rovers on 26 August 2017. He was released by AFC Wimbledon when his contract expired in June 2020.

=== NorthEast United ===
On 14 October 2020, Appiah joined Indian Super League club NorthEast United FC on a one-year deal.

=== Crawley Town ===
On 16 August 2021, Appiah joined EFL League Two club Crawley Town on a one-year deal with the option for a second. He scored 12 goals in 29 matches across the 2021–22 season, making him the club's top scorer that season.

In April 2022, he agreed a new two-year contract with Crawley Town.

On 1 September 2022, Appiah joined Colchester United on loan until the end of the 2022–23 season.

On 2 July 2023, he departed Crawley having had his contract terminated by mutual consent.

=== Boreham Wood ===
On 14 July 2023, Appiah signed for National League club Boreham Wood on a two-year deal.

=== Ebbsfleet United ===
On 18 June 2025, Appiah returned to National League South side Ebbsfleet United, seventeen years after graduating from the club's youth academy.

== International career ==
Appiah was eligible to represent both Ghana and England. On 24 December 2014, he was called into the 31-man provisional squad for the 2015 Africa Cup of Nations by Ghana. He made his debut in Ghana's 2–1 win over South Africa on 27 January 2015 and scored his first international goal in the quarter-final victory over Guinea.

== Personal life ==
He graduated in 2022 from Staffordshire University having obtained a first class degree in Professional Sports Writing and Broadcasting.

== Career statistics ==
=== Club ===
As of 11 March 2025

Appearances and goals by club, season and competition
| Club | Season | League | | | National Cup | | League Cup | | Other | | Total | |
| Club | Season | Division | Apps | Goals | Apps | Goals | Apps | Goals | Apps | Goals | Apps | Goals |
|---|---|---|---|---|---|---|---|---|---|---|---|---|
| Ebbsfleet United | 2008–09 | Conference Premier | 3 | 1 | — | | — | | — | | 3 | 1 |
| Peterborough United | 2008–09 | League One | 0 | 0 | 0 | 0 | — | | — | | 0 | 0 |
| Peterborough United | 2009–10 | Championship | 0 | 0 | 0 | 0 | 0 | 0 | — | | 0 | 0 |
| Peterborough United | Total | | 0 | 0 | 0 | 0 | 0 | 0 | — | | 0 | 0 |
| Weymouth (loan) | 2008–09 | Conference Premier | 4 | 0 | — | | — | | — | | 4 | 0 |
| Kettering Town (loan) | 2009–10 | Conference Premier | 15 | 2 | — | | — | | — | | 15 | 2 |
| Thurrock | 2010–11 | Conference South | 1 | 0 | — | | — | | — | | 1 | 0 |
| Margate | 2011–12 | Isthmian League Premier Division | 24 | 22 | | | — | | | | 24 | 22 |
| Crystal Palace | 2011–12 | Championship | 4 | 0 | — | | — | | — | | 4 | 0 |
| Crystal Palace | 2012–13 | Championship | 2 | 0 | 1 | 0 | 2 | 0 | 0 | 0 | 5 | 0 |
| Crystal Palace | 2013–14 | Premier League | 0 | 0 | 0 | 0 | 1 | 0 | — | | 1 | 0 |
| Crystal Palace | 2014–15 | Premier League | 0 | 0 | 0 | 0 | — | | — | | 0 | 0 |
| Crystal Palace | 2015–16 | Premier League | 0 | 0 | 0 | 0 | 0 | 0 | — | | 0 | 0 |
| Crystal Palace | Total | | 6 | 0 | 1 | 0 | 3 | 0 | 0 | 0 | 10 | 0 |
| Aldershot Town (loan) | 2012–13 | League Two | 2 | 0 | — | | — | | — | | 2 | 0 |
| Yeovil Town (loan) | 2012–13 | League One | 5 | 0 | — | | — | | — | | 5 | 0 |
| Cambridge United (loan) | 2013–14 | Conference Premier | 14 | 10 | 4 | 0 | — | | 1 (Note: Appearance(s) in FA Trophy) | 0 | 19 | 10 |
| Notts County (loan) | 2013–14 | League One | 7 | 0 | — | | — | | — | | 7 | 0 |
| AFC Wimbledon (loan) | 2013–14 | League Two | 7 | 3 | — | | — | | — | | 7 | 3 |
| Cambridge United (loan) | 2014–15 | League Two | 19 | 6 | 3 | 2 | 1 | 0 | — | | 23 | 8 |
| Reading (loan) | 2014–15 | Championship | 6 | 1 | — | | — | | — | | 6 | 1 |
| Viking (loan) | 2017 | Eliteserien | 12 | 3 | — | | — | | — | | 12 | 3 |
| AFC Wimbledon | 2017–18 | League One | 14 | 3 | 0 | 0 | 1 | 0 | 1 (Note: Appearance(s) in EFL Trophy) | 0 | 16 | 3 |
| AFC Wimbledon | 2018–19 | League One | 26 | 4 | 3 | 2 | 2 | 0 | 2 | 1 | 33 | 7 |
| AFC Wimbledon | 2019–20 | League One | 19 | 4 | 2 | 0 | 1 | 0 | 1 | 0 | 23 | 4 |
| AFC Wimbledon | Total | | 59 | 11 | 5 | 2 | 4 | 0 | 4 | 1 | 72 | 15 |
| NorthEast United | 2020–21 | Indian Super League | 8 | 3 | — | | — | | — | | 8 | 3 |
| Crawley Town | 2021–22 | League Two | 26 | 11 | 1 | 0 | 0 | 0 | 2 | 1 | 29 | 12 |
| Crawley Town | 2022–23 | League Two | 4 | 0 | 0 | 0 | 1 | 0 | 0 | 0 | 5 | 0 |
| Crawley Town | Total | | 30 | 11 | 1 | 0 | 1 | 0 | 2 | 1 | 34 | 12 |
| Colchester United (loan) | 2022–23 | League Two | 9 | 3 | 0 | 0 | 0 | 0 | 1 | 0 | 10 | 3 |
| Boreham Wood | 2023–24 | National League | 16 | 3 | 0 | 0 | — | | 0 | 0 | 16 | 3 |
| Boreham Wood | 2024–25 | National League South | 32 | 24 | 4 | 3 | — | | 3 | 1 | 39 | 28 |
| Boreham Wood | Total | | 48 | 27 | 4 | 3 | — | | 3 | 1 | 55 | 31 |
| Career total | | | 279 | 103 | 18 | 7 | 9 | 0 | 11 | 3 | 317 | 113 |

=== International ===
As of match played 26 November 2020

Appearances and goals by national team and year
| National team | Year | Apps | Goals |
|---|---|---|---|
| Ghana | 2015 | 6 | 1 |
| Ghana | 2019 | 1 | 1 |
| Total | | 7 | 2 |

Scores and results list Ghana's goal tally first, score column indicates score after each Appiah goal.

List of international goals scored by Kwesi Appiah
| No. | Date | Venue | Opponent | Score | Result | Competition | Ref. |
|---|---|---|---|---|---|---|---|
| 1 | 1 February 2015 | Estadio de Malabo, Malabo, Equatorial Guinea | Guinea | 2–0 | 3–0 | 2015 Africa Cup of Nations | |
| 2 | 26 March 2019 | Accra Sports Stadium, Accra, Ghana | Mauritania | 1–0 | 3–1 | Friendly | |

== Honours ==
Boreham Wood

- National League South play-offs: 2025

Ghana

- Africa Cup of Nations runner-up: 2015

Individual

- National League South Player of the Month: December 2024
