= Sam Matthews =

English footballer (born 1997)

Samuel Matthews
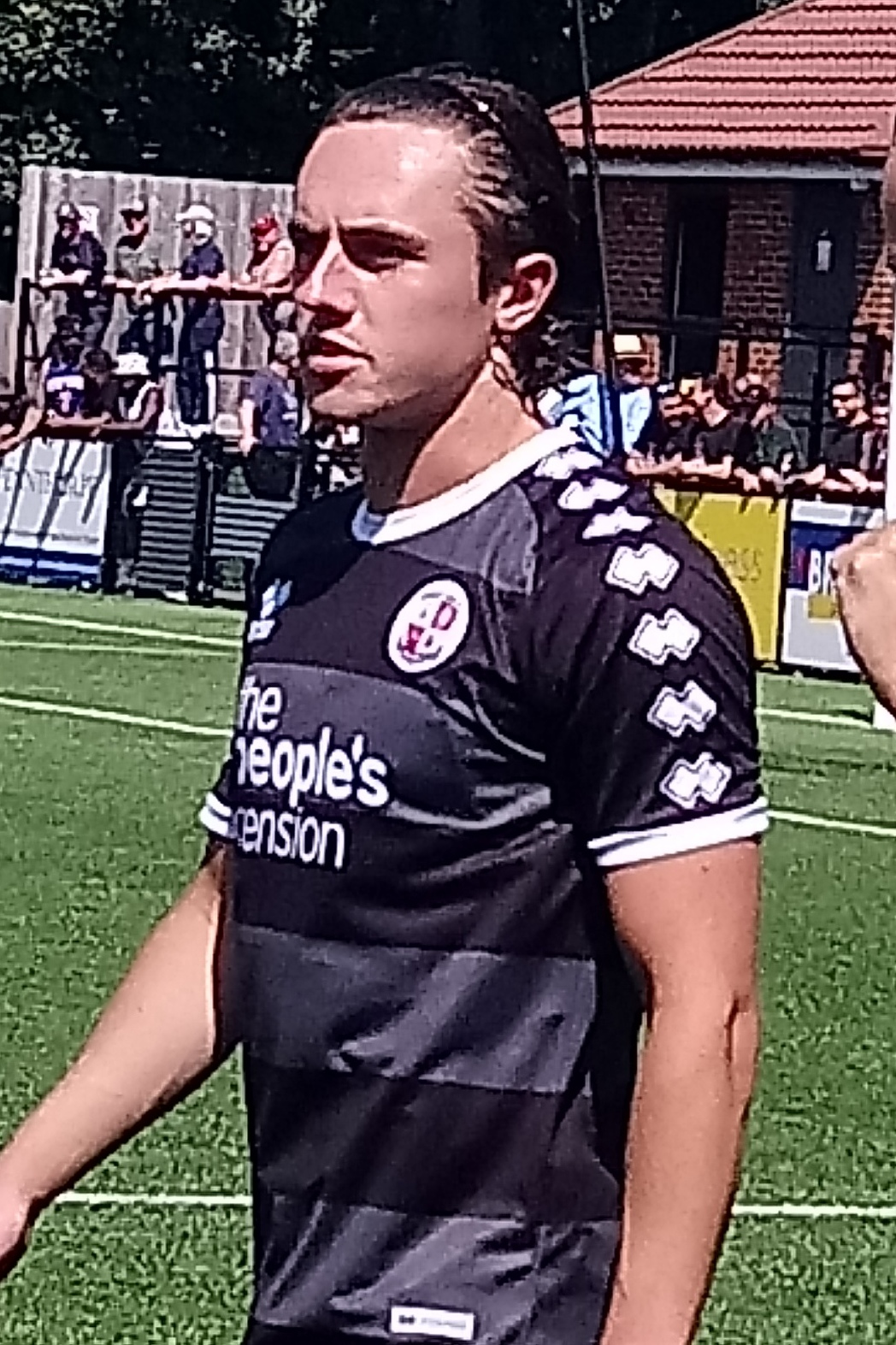
- Matthews in 2021

Personal information
- Full name: Samuel Lloyd Matthews
- Date of birth: 10 March 1997 (age 29)
- Place of birth: Poole, England
- Height: 5 ft 6 in (1.68 m)
- Position: Midfielder

Team information
- Current team: Havant & Waterlooville

Youth career
- 2007–2018: AFC Bournemouth

Senior career*
Years	Team	Apps	(Gls)
2016–2018	AFC Bournemouth	0	(0)
2014	→ Poole Town	0	(0)
2016–2017	→ Braintree Town (loan)	11	(1)
2017	→ Eastleigh (loan)	13	(3)
2017–2018	→ Eastleigh (loan)	39	(6)
2018–2020	Bristol Rovers	16	(0)
2019	→ Eastleigh (loan)	8	(0)
2020–2022	Crawley Town	38	(1)
2022	→ Aldershot Town (loan)	5	(0)
2022	Wealdstone	2	(0)
2023–	Havant & Waterlooville	3	(1)
- * Club domestic league appearances and goals as of 14:13, 27 January 2023 (UTC)

Samuel Lloyd Matthews (born 10 March 1997) is an English footballer who plays as a midfielder for Havant & Waterlooville.

== Career ==
=== AFC Bournemouth ===
Born in Poole, Matthews joined AFC Bournemouth at the age of 10 and signed his first senior contract with the club in 2014, on his 17th birthday.

His first taste of senior football came in a loan spell with his hometown club of Poole Town in 2014. However, he suffered a serious ankle injury just 29 minutes into his debut in a 4–0 FA Cup win over Bradford Town and was forced to return to his parent club.

On 31 August 2016, Matthews and fellow Bournemouth youngster Brandon Goodship joined Braintree Town of the National League on loan until January 2017. He was an unused substitute on 3 September in a 0–0 away draw at Guiseley, and made his debut the following week in a 4–1 home defeat to Gateshead where he was a 66th minute replacement for Rohdell Gordon. He scored his first goal for the club in a 6–1 away defeat at Dover Athletic as his goal gave Braintree the lead. On 1 January 2017, Matthews' loan spell at Braintree ended and he returned to Bournemouth having made 13 appearances in all competitions, scoring 1 goal.

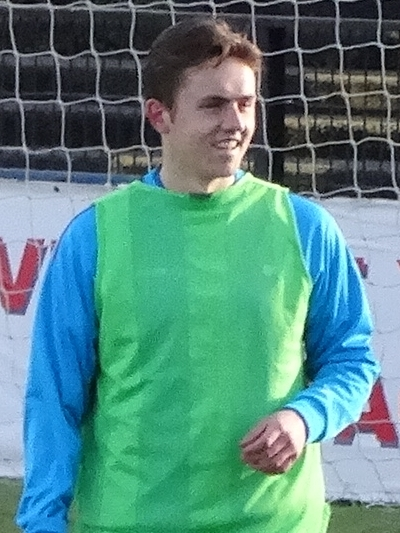
Matthews with Eastleigh in 2017

On 31 January 2017, Matthews joined fellow National League side Eastleigh on loan for the remainder of the season. He made his debut for the club in a 1–1 away draw with Guiseley and scored his first goal for the club with a brace in a 3–2 away victory over Torquay United. He finished his loan spell with Eastleigh with 3 goals in 13 appearances.

He returned to Eastleigh on 8 August 2017, in a loan deal that would see him stay with the club until January. On 12 August 2017, he was substituted on for Mark Yeates in the 81st minute of a 2–2 draw with Dagenham & Redbridge to appear for the first time in his second spell with the club. He gave Eastleigh the lead in a dramatic 3–3 draw with FC Halifax Town to score his first goal back for the club and went on to score another goal for the club before his loan spell ended on 9 January 2018. Eastleigh however decided to extend the loan spell until the end of the season. Matthews finished the season for the spitfires with 6 goals in 39 appearances which included a hat-trick on the final day of the season in a 4–1 away victory against Solihull Moors. Matthews' performances were rewarded when he was awarded with the Player of the Season award for Eastleigh.

=== Bristol Rovers ===
On 6 June 2018, Matthews agreed to join League One side Bristol Rovers upon the expiration of his Bournemouth contract on 1 July 2018. Matthews made his debut for the club when he came off the bench in the opening day defeat to Peterborough United when he replaced Kyle Bennett in the 66th minute.

Matthews joined Eastleigh for a third time on loan on 21 March 2019 and would go on to make 8 appearances before the end of the season. He also came off the bench in both the play-off quarter-final victory over Wrexham and the semi-final defeat to Salford City where Matthews had a penalty saved by Salford goalkeeper Chris Neal in the shootout.

At the end of the 2019–20 season, Matthews was released by Bristol Rovers.

=== Crawley Town ===
Matthews signed for Crawley Town on a two-year deal in the summer of 2020. He made his debut for Crawley Town on 19 September 2020 in a 1–0 League Two victory over Scunthorpe United. On 22 February 2022, Matthews joined National League side Aldershot Town on loan for the remainder of the 2021–22 season.

=== Wealdstone ===
On 21 October 2022, Matthews signed for National League club Wealdstone on a short-term deal until January 2023. On 17 November 2022 Matthews left National League club Wealdstone by mutual consent.

=== Havant & Waterlooville ===
On 26 January 2023 Havant & Waterlooville announced the signing of Matthews on a deal until the end of the season.

== Career statistics ==
As of end of 2021–22 season

Appearances and goals by club, season and competition
Club	Season	League			FA Cup		League Cup		Other		Total	
Club	Season	Division	Apps	Goals	Apps	Goals	Apps	Goals	Apps	Goals	Apps	Goals
AFC Bournemouth	2016–17	Premier League	0	0	0	0	0	0	0	0	0	0
Poole Town (loan)	2014–15	Southern League Division One	0	0	1	0	—		0	0	1	0
Braintree Town (loan)	2016–17	National League	11	1	2	0	—		0	0	13	2
Eastleigh (loan)	2016–17	National League	13	3	0	0	—		0	0	13	3
Eastleigh (loan)	2017–18	National League	39	6	0	0	—		0	0	39	6
Bristol Rovers	2018–19	League One	16	0	1	0	2	0	5 (Note: Appearance(s) in EFL Trophy)	0	24	0
Bristol Rovers	2019–20	League One	0	0	0	0	0	0	0	0	0	0
Bristol Rovers	Total		16	0	1	0	2	0	5	0	24	0
Eastleigh (loan)	2018–19	National League	8	0	0	0	—		2 (Note: Appearance(s) in National League play-offs)	0	10	0
Crawley Town	2020–21	League Two	30	1	2	0	0	0	1	0	33	1
Crawley Town	2021–22	League Two	8	0	0	0	0	0	1	0	9	0
Crawley Town	Total		38	1	2	0	0	0	2	0	42	1
Aldershot Town (loan)	2021–22	National League	5	0	0	0	—		0	0	5	0
Career total			130	11	6	0	2	0	9	0	147	11
