= Barry Fuller =

English footballer (born 1984)

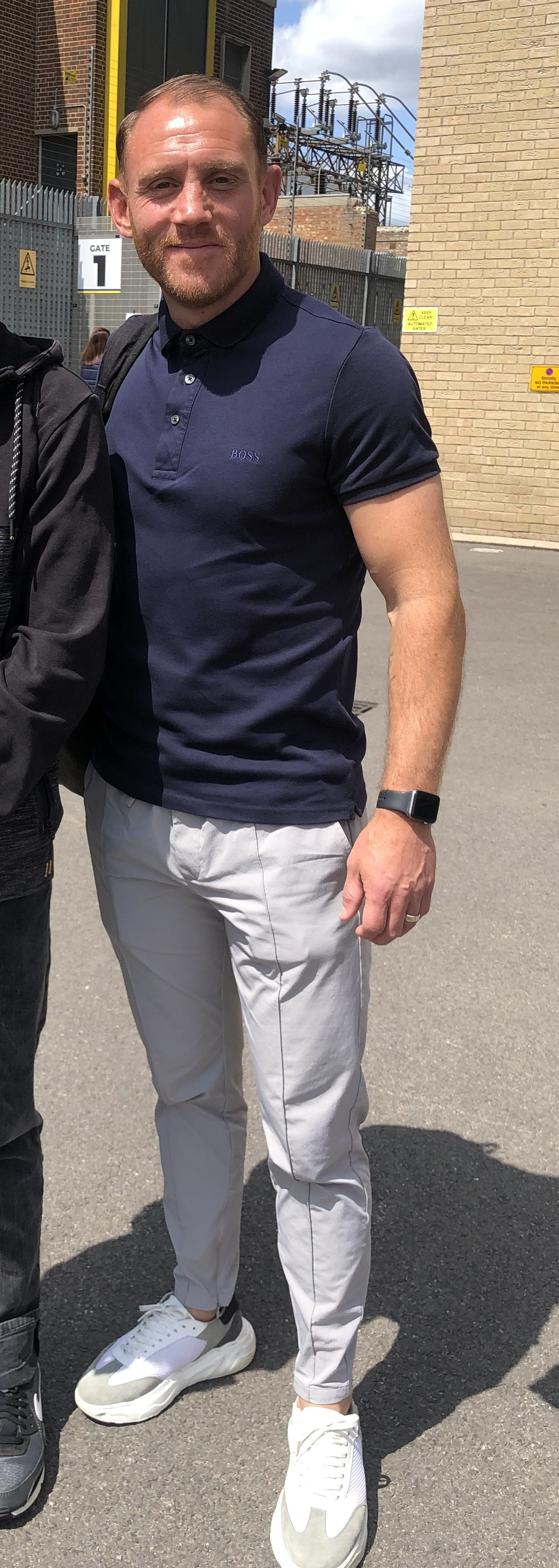
- Fuller in 2025

Personal information
- Full name: Barry Marc Fuller
- Date of birth: 25 September 1984 (age 42)
- Place of birth: Ashford, Kent, England
- Height: 5 ft 10 in (1.78 m)
- Position: Defender

Team information
- Current team: Ashford United

Youth career
- 1994–1997: Stanhope Rangers FC
- 1997: Kennington Juniors FC
- 1997–2004: Charlton Athletic

Senior career*
Years	Team	Apps	(Gls)
2004–2006	Charlton Athletic	0	(0)
2006	→ Barnet (loan)	15	(1)
2006–2008	Stevenage Borough	61	(1)
2008–2012	Gillingham	134	(0)
2012–2013	Barnet	39	(0)
2013–2018	AFC Wimbledon	205	(1)
2018–2020	Gillingham	69	(1)
2020–2025	Dorking Wanderers	98	(2)
2024–2025	→ Ashford United (loan)	19	(2)
2025–	Ashford United	33	(2)

International career
2007	England C	1	(0)
- * Club domestic league appearances and goals as of 18:29, 25 April 2026 (UTC)

Barry Marc Fuller (born 25 September 1984) is an English professional footballer who plays as a defender for Isthmian League South East Division club Ashford United.

He previously played for Stevenage Borough, forming part of the squad that won the 2006–07 FA Trophy in the first competitive final at the new Wembley Stadium after they beat Kidderminster Harriers 2–1 on 12 May 2007 in front of a record FA Trophy crowd of 53,262. Fuller has also made over 200 appearances for Gillingham and was captain of the squad that beat Shrewsbury Town 1–0 in the League Two play-off final at Wembley Stadium on 23 May 2009 to win promotion to League One.

== Club career ==
=== Early years ===
Born in Ashford, Kent, Fuller was spotted playing for his local club, Kennington Juniors FC, by Premier League side Charlton Athletic who signed him to their youth Academy at the age of thirteen. The full-back progressed through the Addicks' Academy up until the age of nineteen, signing his first professional contract on 1 July 2004. On 17 July 2004, he featured for Charlton Athletic in a pre-season friendly win over Southern League side Sittingbourne; he scored in the 83rd minute to confirm a 3–0 win following a brace by fellow youngster Lloyd Sam. The young right-back was selected to captain Charlton Athletic's Reserves side during the 2004–05 season, helping the club to finish as Champions of the Premier Reserve League Southern Division. He also represented Charlton in the first ever Premier Reserve League Shield national play-off final on 12 May 2005, which saw Northern Division champions Manchester United Reserves beat the Addicks 4–2 at The Valley. Despite his success with the Reserves, however, he failed to break into the first team and was subsequently loaned out to League Two side Barnet on an initial one-month deal on 12 January 2006. The 21-year-old defender made his Football League debut on 14 January 2006 in a 4–1 defeat by Lincoln City. On 15 February 2006, it was announced that he would remain with Barnet for a further month. On 18 March 2006, he scored his first Football League goal in a 2–2 draw with Peterborough United. On 24 March 2006, Barnet manager Paul Fairclough extended Fuller's loan for a third and final time up until 22 April. He played his final game for the Bees on 22 April 2006 in a 0–0 draw with Chester City before subsequently returning to Charlton Athletic. In total, he made fifteen league appearances for Barnet during the 2005–06 season, which proved to be a vital contribution in helping the club avoid relegation from the Football League. Despite impressing on his loan spell, the 20-year-old defender was released by Charlton Athletic manager Alan Curbishley at the end of the season.

=== Stevenage Borough ===
On 28 June 2006, Fuller signed for Conference side Stevenage Borough. He made his debut for the Boro in a 2–1 defeat by York City on 15 August 2006. The defender scored his only goal for the club in a 2–0 win over Grays Athletic on 17 February 2007. He was ever-present throughout the 2006–07 season, making thirty-seven league appearances in all. He was also indispensable to the club's FA Trophy success, featuring in both semi-final legs which saw Stevenage Borough beat Grays Athletic 3–1 on aggregate. He was part of the squad that played in the 2007 FA Trophy Final against Kidderminster Harriers on 12 May 2007 in front of a record FA Trophy crowd of 53,262. Stevenage came back from 2–0 down to ultimately triumph 3–2 following an 88th-minute goal by Steve Morison; the victory was all the more significant for Fuller as he became a member of the first team to win a competitive final at the new Wembley Stadium. He would go on to make 24 league appearances for the Boro during the 2007–08 season before subsequently leaving the club to sign a two-year deal with League One side Gillingham on 28 January 2008 along with teammate Stuart Lewis; reuniting him with the manager who had previously recruited him at Stevenage Borough, Mark Stimson.

=== Gillingham ===
Fuller made his debut for Gillingham in the 2–0 defeat to Tranmere Rovers on 29 January 2008. The defender would go on to make nine more appearances for the Gills in the 2007–08 season. On 10 October 2008, despite having only been with the Gills for nine months, the 24-year-old was appointed as club captain. He made forty league appearances in total during the 2008–09 season, making him integral to the club's push for promotion. In spite of this level of consistency, however, his season was wrought with difficulty. The defender's troubles began when he was sent off for a second yellow card offence after a foul on Sam Wood in the 88th minute of a 1–1 draw with Brentford on 20 December 2008, resulting in a one match ban. His troubles did not end there however, as in January 2009 he was rushed to hospital after contracting bacterial pneumonia. He made a rapid recovery, however, and returned just five weeks later to play a full match in a 2–0 defeat by Rotherham United at Millmoor on 14 February 2009. Despite these set-backs, he was able to help Gillingham finish the season in 5th place, making them eligible for the League Two play-offs. Gillingham faced Rochdale in the play-off semi-final, drawing 0–0 in the first leg on 7 May 2009, before securing a place in the play-off final by beating Rochdale 2–1 at the Priestfield Stadium in the second leg on 10 May 2009. Gillingham faced Shrewsbury Town in the 2009 League Two play-off final at Wembley Stadium on 23 May 2009, in which Fuller captained his side to a 1–0 win over "The Shrews" in front of a crowd of 53,706 to seal promotion to League One, a dramatic turn of events considering that he had been suffering with a life-threatening illness just five months before.

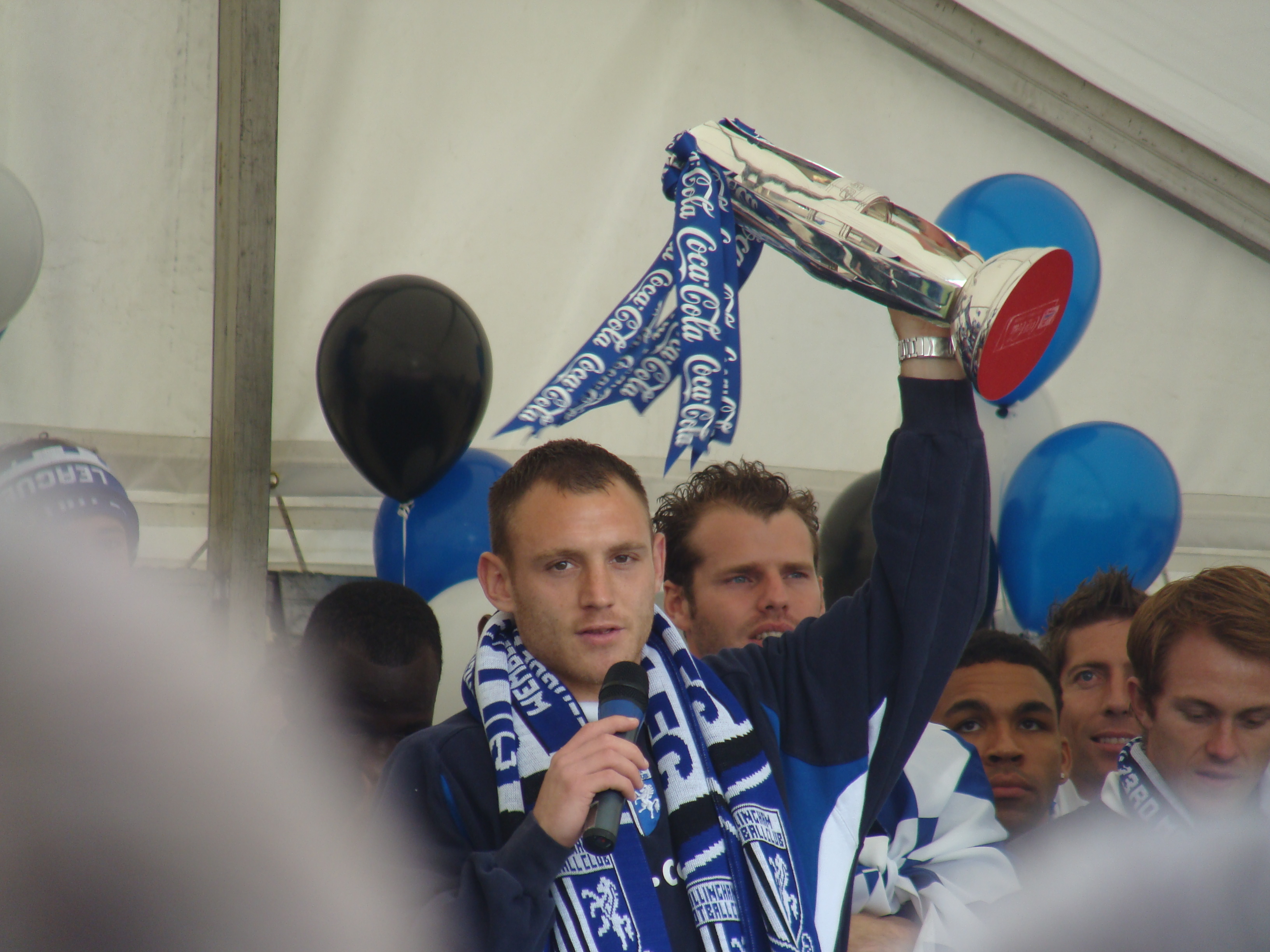
Fuller holding the League Two Play-off Winners trophy after captaining Gillingham to a 1–0 victory over Shrewsbury Town at Wembley Stadium on 23 May 2009

Fuller made 36 league appearances for "The Gills" in their first season back in League One, however, once again the latter half of his season was blighted by injury. The 25-year-old Gillingham captain suffered a broken arm after taking a kick on the forearm in a 1–1 draw with Leyton Orient on 23 February 2010. A specialist subsequently confirmed that this injury would sideline him for approximately six weeks. By the time of his return the Gills were embroiled in a battle to avoid relegation and their fortunes took a turn for the worse when Fuller suffered a broken nose mere seconds after kick-off after a clash of heads with teammate Darren Dennehy in what would go on to be a 3–2 win over Leeds United on 17 April 2010; he was substituted by Jack Payne in the fourth minute of play. Fuller was unable to prevent the Gills' relegation slide back into League Two after he was sidelined for the rest of the season, undergoing surgery on his broken nose a few days after the incident. In spite of this, however, he was offered a two-year contract extension, along with teammate Garry Richards, by new Gills manager Andy Hessenthaler on 25 March 2010. He accepted the terms and on 4 June 2010 it was announced that he had signed a new contract along with striker Dennis Oli.

Gillingham began the 2010–11 season in poor form, winning just three of their first sixteen games of the season which brought the Gills captain under fire. However, the side quickly turned their form around by going on to win six of their next eight league games and were unbeaten for 16 league matches between a 2–1 win over Aldershot Town on 29 January 2011 and a 1–1 draw with Morecambe on 16 April 2011. Fuller made his 100th league appearance for Gillingham on 30 October 2010 in a 2–1 defeat by Northampton Town. The Gills ultimately finished in 8th place, just missing out on the League Two play-offs. He made forty-two league appearances for Gillingham throughout the season. On 27 July 2011, Gillingham announced that Fuller would be relieved of the captain's armband, having worn it for three seasons, and would be replaced by new signing Andy Frampton. The right-back once again found himself plagued by injury worries in the 2011–12 season, making just nine league appearances. He suffered an injury to his knee in a 6–1 win over Hereford United on 17 September 2011. On further examination the injury was found to be serious and on 13 October 2011 it was announced that he would be out for the rest of the season and had to undergo a "career-saving" knee operation immediately which would prevent him from playing again for nine months. This proved to be a devastating blow for Fuller, whose contract was due to expire at the end of the 2012 season, as his deal was not renewed by new Gillingham manager Martin Allen and he was subsequently released by the club on 28 July 2012 having made 137 league appearances.

=== Barnet ===
On 13 August 2012, Fuller signed for League Two side Barnet on a free transfer, along with Gillingham teammate Curtis Weston. He made his debut for the Bees in a 1–1 draw with Bristol Rovers on 21 August 2012. He would go on to make 39 league appearances, cementing his place as the club's first choice right-back. Barnet started the 2012–13 season poorly, failing to win any of their first 12 league matches and were ultimately relegated to the Conference on goal difference after finishing in 23rd place. Barnet's relegation required manager Edgar Davids to release a number of players as an austerity measure to accommodate the fact that the club would be operating on a smaller wage budget in the 2013–14 season, and it was announced on 22 May 2013 that Fuller would be released along with 12 other players.

=== AFC Wimbledon ===
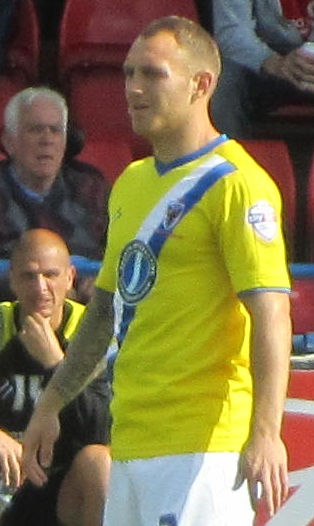
Fuller playing for AFC Wimbledon in 2013

On 28 May 2013, Fuller signed for League Two side AFC Wimbledon along with former Havant & Waterlooville midfielder Chris Arthur. Shortly after his signing, Fuller disclosed to the media that he hoped to establish himself as a key member of the squad and expressed his loyalty to the club by stating that he hoped to see out the rest of his professional career with AFC Wimbledon. A month later, he found himself reunited with former teammate and fellow ex-Gillingham captain, Andy Frampton, when it was announced that he had also signed a contract with the South London club on 28 June 2013. On 31 July 2013, manager Neal Ardley appointed Alan Bennett as club captain and declared that Fuller would act as vice-captain for the 2013–14 season. Fuller made his league debut for "The Dons" in a 1–1 draw with Torquay United on 3 August 2013. He was an ever-present for the club throughout the season, making forty five league appearances in total. Fuller's consistently committed performances and dogged attitude quickly established him as a favourite with supporters, culminating in him being voted as Player of the Year at the end of season awards. He scored his first goal for the Dons when he scored the winner in a 1–0 win over Dagenham & Redbridge.

He was released by AFC Wimbledon at the end of the 2017–18 season.

=== Return to Gillingham ===
On 2 June 2018, Fuller returned to Gillingham, signing a one-year contract. He made 38 league appearances in the 2018–19 season and was voted as the club's Player of the Season.

On 5 April 2019, he signed a one-year contract extension with the club. Fuller made his 200th appearance for the club in a 1–0 defeat to Coventry City on 24 August 2019.

In June 2020 he triggered a one-year extension to his contract with the Kent club, but was informed by manager Steve Evans that he was free to pursue other options with Evans citing a desire to build a more youthful squad.

On 6 August 2020, it was confirmed that Fuller had left Gillingham after he, along with the club, decided to terminate his contract by mutual consent.

=== Dorking Wanderers ===
On 27 August 2020, Fuller joined National League South side Dorking Wanderers. He captained the Surrey side to promotion to the National League at the end of the 2021–22 season, defeating Ebbsfleet United in a play-off final.

On 8 November 2024, Fuller joined hometown club Ashford United of the Isthmian League South East Division on a one-month loan deal.

On 14 May 2025, it was announced that Fuller would leave the club at the end of his contract in June.

=== Ashford United ===
On 21 June 2025, Fuller agreed to return to Ashford United on a permanent basis upon the expiry of his contract at Dorking Wanderers. In September 2025 he was appointed Head of Football Development at the club.

== International career ==
Fuller's only appearance for a national team came when he was selected to represent the England C team, along with fellow Stevenage Borough teammates Ronnie Henry and Steve Morison, in an international friendly against Northern Ireland on 13 February 2007 which ended as a 3–1 win for England.

== Career statistics ==
As of match played 25 April 2026

Appearances and goals by club, season and competition
Club	Season	League			Play-offs		FA Cup		League Cup		Other (Note: Includes Football League Trophy, FA Trophy.)		Total	
Club	Season	Division	Apps	Goals	Apps	Goals	Apps	Goals	Apps	Goals	Apps	Goals	Apps	Goals
Charlton Athletic	2004–05	Premier League	0	0	0	0	0	0	0	0	0	0	0	0
Barnet (loan)	2005–06	League Two	15	1	0	0	0	0	0	0	0	0	15	1
Stevenage Borough	2006–07	Conference	37	1	0	0	1	0	0	0	5	0	43	1
Stevenage Borough	2007–08	Conference	24	0	0	0	1	0	0	0	0	0	25	0
Stevenage Borough	Total		61	1	0	0	2	0	0	0	5	0	68	1
Gillingham	2007–08	League One	10	0	0	0	0	0	0	0	0	0	10	0
Gillingham	2008–09	League Two	37	0	3	0	3	0	1	0	1	0	45	0
Gillingham	2009–10	League One	36	0	0	0	3	0	2	0	1	0	42	0
Gillingham	2010–11	League Two	42	0	0	0	1	0	0	0	1	0	44	0
Gillingham	2011–12	League Two	9	0	0	0	0	0	1	0	0	0	10	0
Gillingham	Total		134	0	3	0	7	0	4	0	3	0	151	0
Barnet	2012–13	League Two	39	0	0	0	1	0	0	0	1	0	41	0
AFC Wimbledon	2013–14	League Two	45	0	0	0	1	0	1	0	1	0	48	0
AFC Wimbledon	2014 – 15	League Two	45	1	0	0	4	0	1	0	3	0	53	1
AFC Wimbledon	2015–16	League Two	45	0	3	0	1	0	1	0	1	0	51	0
AFC Wimbledon	2016–17	League One	28	0	0	0	5	0	1	0	1	0	35	0
AFC Wimbledon	2017 – 18	League One	42	0	0	0	3	0	1	0	0	0	46	0
AFC Wimbledon	Total		205	1	3	0	14	0	5	0	6	0	233	1
Gillingham	2018–19	League One	39	1	0	0	4	0	1	0	0	0	44	0
Gillingham	2019–20	League One	30	0	0	0	4	0	1	0	0	0	35	0
Gillingham	Total		69	1	0	0	8	0	2	0	0	0	79	0
Dorking Wanderers	2020–21	National League South	16	0	0	0	1	0	0	0	1	0	18	0
Dorking Wanderers	2021–22	National League South	25	2	2	1	2	0	0	0	1	0	30	3
Dorking Wanderers	2022–23	National League	23	0	0	0	0	0	0	0	2	0	25	0
Dorking Wanderers	2023–24	National League	25	0	0	0	0	0	2	0	0	0	27	0
Dorking Wanderers	2024–25	National League South	9	0	0	0	0	0	0	0	0	0	9	0
Dorking Wanderers	Total		98	2	2	1	3	0	0	0	6	0	109	3
Ashford United (loan)	2024–25	Isthmian League South East Division	19	2	0	0	0	0	0	0	0	0	19	2
Ashford United	2025–26	Isthmian League South East Division	33	2	2	0	0	0	0	0	0	0	35	2
Career total			673	10	10	1	35	0	11	0	21	0	750	11

== Honours ==
Stevenage Borough

- FA Trophy: 2006–07

Gillingham

- Football League Two play-offs: 2009

AFC Wimbledon

- Football League Two play-offs: 2016

Dorking Wanderers

- National League South play-offs: 2022
- Surrey Senior Cup: 2021–22

Individual

- AFC Wimbledon Player of the Season: 2013–14
- AFC Wimbledon Player's Player of the Season: 2013–14, 2015–16
- AFC Wimbledon Team of the Decade (2010s)
- Gillingham Player of the Season: 2018–19
- National League South Team of the Year: 2021–22
