= 2022–23 Crawley Town F.C. season =

Crawley Town FC
2022–23 season
- Owner: WAGMI United
- Co-chairmen: Preston Johnson; Eben Smith
- Manager: Kevin Betsy (until 9 October); Matthew Etherington (between 27 November–29 December); Scott Lindsey (from 11 January)
- Stadium: Broadfield Stadium
- League Two: 22nd
- FA Cup: First round
- EFL Cup: Third round
- EFL Trophy: Group stage
- Top goalscorer: League: Dom Telford (12 goals); All: Dom Telford (15 goals)
Home colours	Away colours	Third colours

The 2022–23 season was Crawley Town's 127th season in their history and eighth consecutive season in League Two. The club finished 22nd in the league, three points above relegated side Hartlepool United, and also competed in the FA Cup, where they were eliminated in the first round, the EFL Cup, where they were eliminated in the third round, and the EFL Trophy, where they were eliminated in the group stage. The season covered the period from 1 July 2022 to 30 June 2023.

== Season summary ==
In April 2022, the club was taken over by American cryptocurrency investment group WAGMI United, whose stated goal was "to reinvent broken legacy sports management models" and wanted to turn the club into "the internet's team". Upon taking over the club they set the target of achieving promotion to EFL League One by the end of their second season. After manager John Yems was suspended by the club in April 2022, and later banned from football for 18 months for racist abuse of his own playing squad, Lewis Young took charge of the club on a caretaker basis for the final four matches of the 2021–22 season.

Crawley brought in Kevin Betsy as manager ahead of the 2022–23 season, who wanted to implement a possession-based style of football and instilled new training methods to the club, such as the use of a drone to record training sessions, and collecting urine samples from players to monitor hydration levels. Betsy was sacked on 9 October 2022 however, with the club bottom of League Two and having won one of 12 league matches, and his assistant manager Lewis Young took over on an interim basis. Young's tenure at Crawley saw the club pick up 12 points from seven matches, but despite his expectation to be given the manager role on a permanent basis, the club instead decided to appoint Matthew Etherington as manager on an 18-month contract, with co-owner Eben Smith later explaining in a thread on Twitter that he felt the club's underlying statistics were much worse than the results they picked up, and that "there was a better chance we'd be relegated with him than without him". However Etherington was sacked a month later, having managed just three matches as manager, and Darren Byfield took over from him on an interim basis. Byfield was joined in the dugout by co-chairman Preston Johnson for an away defeat to Stevenage, with Johnson the subject of ridicule online when he was overheard asking the fourth official how substitutions work. Swindon Town manager Scott Lindsey took over as manager on 11 January 2023 alongside his assistant Jamie Day, with the club 21st in the league. Lindsey won his first match as manager of Crawley, a 3–2 win at home to Salford City, but were winless in their following 8 matches. Despite this, a 2–0 win away to relegation rivals Hartlepool United on 22 April left the club needing a single point from their remaining two matches to confirm safety, which they picked up in the following match with a 0–0 draw against Walsall.

== Competitions ==
=== Pre-season ===
Horsham revealed a friendly with Crawley on 10 May 2022, though this fixture was later cancelled. Sutton Common Rovers did likewise on 17 May, though this fixture was later cancelled. On 22 June, the Reds confirmed their first four pre-season friendlies, against Eastbourne Borough, East Grinstead Town, Charlton Athletic U23s and Aldershot Town. Two days later, a home fixture against Queens Park Rangers was confirmed. An eight addition was added to the schedule, against Three Bridges. A trip to Murcia and a friendly against Qatar SC were announced on 1 July, but the match against Qatar SC was cancelled later that day. the Another match was added to pre-season calendar, against Heart of Midlothian.

On 20 December, Crawley announced they would travel to the training ground of West Ham United to play a behind-closed-doors friendly against their U21 side.

Date	Time	Opponent	Venue	Result F–A	Scorers	Attendance	Ref.
2 July 2022	15:00	Eastbourne Borough	Away	1–0	Appiah 48'		
9 July 2022	15:00	Queens Park Rangers	Home	3–3	Tilley 64', Nichols 69' (pen.), Adebowale 80'	2,674	
11 July 2022	19:30	East Grinstead Town	Away	9–0	Trialist x4, Trialist, Own Goal, Trialist (pen.), Trialist x2		
13 July 2022	19:45	Three Bridges	Away	5–0	Tilley, Appiah, Nadesan x2, Oteh		
16 July 2022	13:00	Heart of Midlothian	Away	2–2	Telford x2	3,110	
19 July 2022	19:30	Charlton Athletic U23s	Neutral	3–2	Powell, Trialist, Trialist	—	
23 July 2022	15:00	Aldershot Town	Away	2–3	Nadesan, Trialist	—	
20 December 2022	13:00	West Ham United U21	Away	2–1	Telford, Powell	0	

Win	Draw	Loss

=== League Two ===
==== League table ====
Pos	Team	Pld	W	D	L	GF	GA	GD	Pts	Promotion, qualification or relegation
19	Harrogate Town	46	12	16	18	59	68	−9	52	
20	Colchester United	46	12	13	21	44	51	−7	49	
21	AFC Wimbledon	46	11	15	20	48	60	−12	48	
22	Crawley Town	46	11	13	22	48	71	−23	46	
23	Hartlepool United (R)	46	9	16	21	52	78	−26	43	Relegation to National League
24	Rochdale (R)	46	9	11	26	46	70	−24	38	Relegation to National League

Source: EFL Official Website
Rules for classification: 1) Points; 2) Goal difference; 3) Number of goals scored; 4) Head-to-head results; 5) Wins; 6) Away goals; 7) Penalty points (sec 9.5); 8) 12-point sending off offences
(R) Relegated

==== Results summary ====
Overall								Home						Away					
Pld	W	D	L	GF	GA	GD	Pts	W	D	L	GF	GA	GD	W	D	L	GF	GA	GD
46	11	13	22	48	71	−23	46	9	7	7	31	30	+1	2	6	15	17	41	−24

Source: Sky Sports

==== Matches ====
On 23 June 2022, the League Two fixtures were announced for the forthcoming season.

Win	Draw	Loss

Date	Time	Opponent	Venue	Result F–A	Scorers	Attendance	League position	Ref.
30 July 2022	15:00	Carlisle United	Away	0–1	—	6,403	19th	
6 August 2022	15:00	Leyton Orient	Home	0–1	—	3,851	24th	
13 August 2022	15:00	Harrogate Town	Away	0–0	—	1,304	21st	
16 August 2022	19:45	Northampton Town	Home	2–3	Balagizi (2) 4', 61'	2,471	22nd	
20 August 2022	15:00	AFC Wimbledon	Home	0–2	—	3,890	23rd	
27 August 2022	15:00	Rochdale	Away	1–1	Powell 45+2'	2,277	23rd	
3 September 2022	15:00	Salford City	Away	2–2	Nichols 29', Francillette 66'	2,099	22nd	
10 September 2022	15:00	Gillingham	Home	Postponed				
13 September 2022	19:45	Stockport County	Home	3–2	Tilley 5', Telford 35', Tsaroulla 56'	2,187	20th	
17 September 2022	15:00	Crewe Alexandra	Away	0–1	—	3,717	20th	
24 September 2022	15:00	Doncaster Rovers	Away	1–4	Tilley 42'	5,711	22nd	
1 October 2022	15:00	Stevenage	Home	1–2	Nadesan 47'	2,732	22nd	
8 October 2022	15:00	Grimsby Town	Away	0–3	—	6,068	24th	
15 October 2022	15:00	Newport County	Home	2–1	Tilley 40', Nadesan 57'	2,839	23rd	
22 October 2022	15:00	Mansfield Town	Home	3–2	Nadesan 1', 46', Nichols 13'	2,802	21st	
25 October 2022	19:45	Colchester United	Away	2–2	Nadesan 45', Tilley 46'	2,931	19th	
29 October 2022	19:45	Bradford City	Away	1–1	Tilley 61'	16,510	19th	
12 November 2022	15:00	Barrow	Home	1-0	Nadesan 6'	2,588	18th	
19 November 2022	15:00	Walsall	Away	1–2	Telford 11'	6,201	19th	
22 November 2022	19:45	Gillingham	Home	0–0	—	3,284	19th	
3 December 2022	15:00	Swindon Town	Home	2–0	Tsaroulla 79', Powell 83'	3,230	19th	
9 December 2022	19:45	Hartlepool United	Home	0–2		1,955	19th	
17 December 2022	15:00	Tranmere Rovers	Away	Postponed				
26 December 2022	15:00	Sutton United	Home	1–2	Oteh 90+5'	2,926	19th	
30 December 2022	19:45	Stevenage	Away	1–3	Telford 89' (pen.)	3,238	20th	
2 January 2023	15:00	Newport County	Away	2–2	Telford 36', 67' (pen.)	4,184	20th	
14 January 2023	15:00	Doncaster Rovers	Home	Postponed				
21 January 2023	15:00	Sutton United	Away	Postponed				
24 January 2023	19:45	Grimsby Town	Home	Postponed				
28 January 2023	15:00	Salford City	Home	3–2	Telford 25', Conroy 34', Jenks 59'	2,600	20th	
4 February 2023	15:00	Gillingham	Away	0–1	—	9,317	21st	
11 February 2023	15:00	Crewe Alexandra	Home	2–2	Offord 19' (o.g.), Gladwin 90+7'	2,589	21st	
14 February 2023	19:45	Stockport County	Away	1–2	Powell 9'	7,020	22nd	
18 February 2023	15:00	Leyton Orient	Away	0–1	—	7,943	23rd	
25 February 2023	15:00	Carlisle United	Home	2–5	Oteh 50', Telford 84'	2,970	23rd	
28 February 2023	19:45	Tranmere Rovers	Away	0–1		5,105	23rd	
4 March 2023	15:00	Northampton Town	Away	0–1		5,450	23rd	
7 March 2023	19:45	Sutton United	Away	0–3		3,253	23rd	
11 March 2023	15:00	Harrogate Town	Home	3–1	Oteh 8', 44', Mutch 67'	3,317	23rd	
18 March 2023	15:00	AFC Wimbledon	Away	1–0	Nadesan 5'	7,300	22nd	
21 March 2023	19:45	Doncaster Rovers	Home	1–1	Khaleel 82'	2,850	22nd	
25 March 2023	15:00	Rochdale	Home	2–0	Telford 35', Conroy 39'	4,700	22nd	
28 March 2023	19:45	Grimsby Town	Home	1–1	Telford 87' (pen.)	2,668	22nd	
1 April 2023	15:00	Mansfield Town	Away	1–4	Ogungbo 71'	6,080	22nd	
7 April 2023	15:00	Bradford City	Home	0–0		3,644	22nd	
10 April 2023	15:00	Barrow	Away	0–4		3,335	23rd	
15 April 2023	15:00	Tranmere Rovers	Home	2–1	Oteh 30', Powell 40'	2,812	22nd	
18 April 2023	19:45	Colchester United	Home	0–0		2,894	22nd	
22 April 2023	15:00	Hartlepool United	Away	2–0	Telford (2) 40', 66'	6,812	22nd	
29 April 2023	15:00	Walsall	Home	0–0		4,189	22nd	
10 May 2023	13:00	Swindon Town	Away	1–2	Telford 62' pen.	10,450	22nd	

=== FA Cup ===
The Reds were drawn at home to Accrington Stanley in the first round.

Win	Draw	Loss

Round	Date	Time	Opponent	Venue	Result F–A	Scorers	Attendance	Ref.
First round	5 November 2022	15:00	Accrington Stanley	H	1–4	Hessenthaler 18'	2,770	

=== EFL Cup ===
Crawley Town were drawn at home against Bristol Rovers in the first round and to Fulham in the second round.

Win	Draw	Loss

Round	Date	Time	Opponent	Venue	Result F–A	Scorers	Attendance	Ref.
First round	9 August 2022	19:45	Bristol Rovers	Home	1–0	Nichols 73'	1,860	
Second round	23 August 2022	19:45	Fulham	Home	2–0	Nichols 16', Balagizi 49'	5,577	
Third round	8 November 2022	19:45	Burnley	Away	1–3	Telford 22'	6,329	

=== EFL Trophy ===
On 20 June, the initial Group stage draw was made, grouping Crawley Town with AFC Wimbledon and Portsmouth. Three days later, Aston Villa U21 joined Southern Group B.

Pos	Div	Team	Pld	W	PW	PL	L	GF	GA	GD	Pts	Qualification
1	L2	AFC Wimbledon	3	2	0	1	0	6	4	+2	7	Advance to Round 2
2	L1	Portsmouth	3	1	1	1	0	8	3	+5	6	Advance to Round 2
3	L2	Crawley Town	3	1	1	0	1	9	7	+2	5	
4	ACA	Aston Villa U21	3	0	0	0	3	3	12	−9	0	

Source: EFL.com

Win	Draw	Loss

Round	Date	Time	Opponent	Venue	Result F–A	Scorers	Attendance	Ref.
Group Stage	30 August 2022	19:45	Portsmouth	Home	2–2 (6–5 p)	Telford 8' (pen.), Bremang 90+5' (pen.)	2,314	
Group Stage	20 September 2022	19:45	AFC Wimbledon	Away	2–3	Powell 59', Frimpong 90+6' (o.g.)	903	
Group Stage	18 October 2022	19:45	Aston Villa U21	Home	5–2	Davis 28', Oteh 40', 52', Marshall 83', Telford 90+4' (pen.)	896	

== Transfers ==
=== Transfers in ===
Date	Position	Name	Previous club (Note: Brackets around club names denote the player's contract with that club had expired before he joined Crawley)	Fee	Ref.
1 July 2022	DF	Dion Conroy	(Swindon Town)	Free Transfer	
1 July 2022 (Note: The transfer was announced on 21 June, and will become official on 1 July, once his Crewe Alexandra contract expires)	DF	Travis Johnson	(Crewe Alexandra)	Free Transfer	
1 July 2022 (Note: The transfer was announced on 24 June, and will become official on 1 July, once his Newport County contract expires)	FW	Dom Telford	(Newport County)	Free Transfer	
4 July 2022	GK	Corey Addai	(Esbjerg)	Free Transfer	
9 July 2022	DF	Tobi Omole	(Tottenham Hotspur)	Free Transfer	
20 July 2022	MF	Jayden Davis	(Millwall)	Free Transfer	
20 July 2022	FW	Moe Shubbar	(Cheshunt)	Free Transfer	
20 July 2022	DF	Ben Wells	(Welling United)	Free Transfer	
1 July 2022	DF	Brandon Mason	(Milton Keynes Dons)	Free Transfer	
19 August 2022	FW	David Bremang	Barnsley	Undisclosed	
27 January 2023	MF	Ben Gladwin	Swindon Town	Undisclosed	
31 January 2023	DF	Kellan Gordon	Mansfield Town	Undisclosed	
31 January 2023	MF	Jack Roles	Woking	Undisclosed	
6 February 2023	FW	Jedidiah Brown	Fisher	Free Transfer	
2 March 2023	MF	Jordon Mutch	Free agent	—N/a	
23 March 2023	MF	Anthony Grant	Free agent	—N/a	

=== Loans in ===
Date	Position	Name	Club	Return	Ref.
1 July 2022	MF	James Balagizi	Liverpool	20 January 2023 (Note: On 20 January, Balagizi returned to Liverpool early due to an injury setback)	
29 July 2022	MF	Teddy Jenks	Brighton & Hove Albion	End of Season	
30 July 2022	GK	Ellery Balcombe	Brentford	17 January 2023 (Note: On 17 January, Balcombe was recalled back to Brentford)	
1 August 2022	DF	Mazeed Ogungbo	Arsenal	End of Season	
19 August 2022	GK	David Robson	Hull City	1 January 2023	
1 September 2022	FW	Caleb Chukwuemeka	Aston Villa	End of Season	
1 September 2022	MF	Tom Fellows	West Bromwich Albion	End of Season	
31 January 2023	GK	Ryan Schofield	Huddersfield Town	End of Season	
31 January 2023	MF	Jack Spong	Brighton & Hove Albion	End of Season	

=== Transfers out ===
Date	Position	Name	Subsequent club (Note: Brackets around club names denote the player joined that club after his contract with Crawley expired)	Fee	Ref.
30 June 2022	MF	Henry Burnett	(Billericay Town)	Released	
30 June 2022	DF	Archie Davies	(Aldershot Town)	Released	
30 June 2022	MF	Tyler Frost	(Harrogate Town)	Released	
30 June 2022	FW	Ricky German	(Chesham United)	Released	
30 June 2022	FW	Reece Grego-Cox	(Woking)	Released	
30 June 2022	GK	Alfie Jones		Released	
30 June 2022	DF	Jordan Tunnicliffe	(Wrexham)	Rejected Contract	
30 June 2022	MF	Sam Matthews	(Wealdstone)	Released	
28 July 2022	MF	Jack Payne	(Boreham Wood)	Mutual Consent	
20 October 2022	FW	Mustafa Hussein		Mutual Consent	
31 December 2022	FW	Mark Marshall	(Maidstone United)	Released	
1 January 2023 (Note: The transfer was announced on 28 December, and would become official on 1 January, once the transfer window re-opens.)	FW	Tom Nichols	Gillingham	Undisclosed	
12 January 2023	GK	Glenn Morris	Gillingham	Mutual Consent	
26 January 2023	FW	David Bremang	(Hungerford Town)	Mutual Consent	
31 January 2023	DF	George Francomb	(Dorking Wanderers)	Mutual Consent	
31 January 2023	DF	Owen Gallacher	(Grimsby Town)	Mutual Consent	
6 February 2023	MF	Ronan Silva	(Farnborough)	Mutual Consent	
9 February 2023	DF	Emmanuel Adebowale	(Dartford)	Mutual Consent	
16 February 2023	MF	Szymon Kowalczyk		Mutual Consent	
27 February 2023	MF	Zaid Al-Hussaini	(Farnborough)	Mutual Consent	
2 March 2023	MF	Kaan Kevser-Junior		Mutual Consent	
23 March 2023	FW	Moe Shubbar		Mutual Consent	

=== Loans out ===
Date	Position	Name	Club	Return	Ref.
13 July 2022	FW	Davide Rodari	Dartford	End of Season	
29 July 2022	GK	Glenn Morris	Gillingham	End of Season	
1 September 2022	FW	Kwesi Appiah	Colchester United	End of Season	
23 September 2022	FW	Moe Shubbar	Worthing	31 December 2022	
31 January 2023	MF	Jake Hessenthaler	Woking	End of Season	
11 February 2023	MF	Florian Kastrati	Eastbourne Borough	End of Season	
13 February 2023	DF	Tony Craig	Dorking Wanderers	End of Season	
17 February 2023	FW	Moe Shubbar	Slough Town	End of Season	
14 March 2023	FW	Jayden Davis	Lewes	End of Season	
14 March 2023	MF	Florian Katrati	Bognor Regis Town	End of Season	

== Appearances and goals ==
Numbers in parentheses denote appearances as substitute.
Players with names struck through and marked † left the club during the playing season.
Players with names in italics and marked * were on loan from another club for the whole of their season with Crawley.
Key to positions: GK – Goalkeeper; DF – Defender; MF – Midfielder; FW – Forward

Players included in matchday squads
No.	Pos.	Nat.	Name	League Two		FA Cup		EFL Cup		EFL Trophy		Total	
No.	Pos.	Nat.	Name	Apps	Goals	Apps	Goals	Apps	Goals	Apps	Goals	Apps	Goals
1	GK	ENG	~~Glenn Morris~~ †	0	0	0	0	0	0	0	0	0	0
2	DF	ENG	Kellan Gordon	14 (1)	0	0	0	0	0	0	0	14 (1)	0
3	DF	ENG	Dion Conroy	25	2	0	0	1	0	0	0	26	2
4	MF	ENG	~~George Francomb~~ †	9 (2)	0	1	0	1	0	1	0	12 (2)	0
4	MF	ENG	Jordon Mutch	3	1	0	0	0	0	0	0	3	1
5	DF	ENG	~~Tony Craig~~ †	14 (2)	0	1	0	1	0	2	0	18 (2)	0
6	DF	WAL	Joel Lynch	17 (2)	0	0 (1)	0	1	0	0	0	18 (3)	0
7	FW	ENG	James Tilley	24 (11)	5	0	0	0	0	2 (1)	0	26 (12)	5
8	MF	ENG	Jack Powell	40 (5)	4	1	0	2 (1)	0	1 (1)	1	44 (7)	5
9	FW	ENG	~~Tom Nichols~~ †	19	2	1	0	2 (1)	2	0	0	22 (1)	4
10	FW	ENG	Ashley Nadesan	36 (6)	7	1	0	2 (1)	0	1 (1)	0	40 (8)	7
11	DF	ENG	Brandon Mason	8 (4)	0	0	0	0	0	2	0	10 (4)	0
12	DF	ENG	Harry Ransom	15 (5)	0	1	0	2	0	1	0	19 (5)	0
13	GK	ENG	Ryan Schofield *	2	0	0	0	0	0	0	0	2	0
14	FW	SWE	~~Moe Shubbar~~ †	0	0	0	0	0	0	0	0	0	0
15	DF	FRA	Ludwig Francillette	19 (8)	1	0	0	1	0	1 (1)	0	21 (9)	1
16	DF	ENG	Tobi Omole	4	0	0	0	0 (1)	0	0	0	4 (1)	0
17	DF	NGA	~~Manny Adebowale~~ †	2 (1)	0	0	0	0 (1)	0	0 (2)	0	2 (4)	0
18	MF	ENG	Jayden Davis	0 (6)	0	1	0	2	0	1	1	4 (6)	1
19	FW	ENG	Dom Telford	35 (8)	12	0 (1)	0	1	1	2	2	38 (9)	15
20	MF	ENG	~~James Balagizi~~ *†	12 (2)	2	0	0	1 (1)	1	0	0	13 (3)	3
20	MF	ENG	Ben Gladwin	11 (3)	1	0	0	0	0	0	0	11 (3)	1
21	FW	GHA	~~Kwesi Appiah~~ †	1 (3)	0	0	0	1	0	0	0	2 (3)	0
22	DF	IRL	Ben Wells	2 (3)	0	0	0	1 (1)	0	3	0	6 (4)	0
23	DF	ENG	Travis Johnson	21 (4)	0	1	0	2 (1)	0	3	0	27 (5)	0
24	FW	ENG	Aramide Oteh	16 (14)	5	0 (1)	0	1 (1)	0	1 (1)	2	18 (17)	7
25	DF	CYP	Nick Tsaroulla	28	2	0	0	2	0	0	0	30	2
26	MF	ENG	~~Szymon Kowalczyk~~ †	0	0	0	0	0	0	0	0	0	0
27	MF	MAR	Rafiq Khaleel	5 (9)	1	0	0	0	0	0 (3)	0	5 (12)	1
28	MF	ENG	Teddy Jenks *	12 (5)	1	0	0	1 (1)	0	1 (1)	0	14 (7)	1
29	FW	ENG	~~Mustafa Hussein~~ †	0	0	0	0	0	0	0	0	0	0
29	MF	CYP	Jack Roles	2 (7)	0	0	0	0	0	0	0	2 (7)	0
30	MF	ENG	~~Kaan Kevser-Junior~~ †	0	0	0	0	0	0	0	0	0	0
31	MF	ENG	~~Ronan Silva~~ †	0	0	0	0	0	0	0	0	0	0
32	MF	ENG	Florian Kastrati	0	0	0	0	0	0	0	0	0	0
33	FW	SUI	Davide Rodari	0	0	0	0	0	0	0	0	0	0
34	GK	JAM	Corey Addai	31 (1)	0	0	0	2	0	0	0	33 (1)	0
35	DF	SCO	~~Owen Gallacher~~ †	0	0	0	0	0	0	0	0	0	0
36	MF	ENG	~~Zaid Al Hussaini~~ †	0	0	0	0	0	0	1	0	1	0
37	GK	ENG	~~Ellery Balcombe~~ *†	10	0	1	0	1	0	0	0	12	0
38	FW	ENG	Tom Fellows *	23 (15)	0	1	0	0	0	1	0	25 (15)	0
39	MF	ENG	~~Jake Hessenthaler~~ †	20 (1)	0	1	1	2 (1)	0	1 (1)	0	24 (3)	1
40	GK	ENG	Roshan Greensall	0	0	0	0	0	0	0	0	0	0
41	GK	WAL	~~David Robson~~ *†	3	0	0	0	0	0	0	0	3	0
41	MF	ENG	Jack Spong *	1 (4)	0	0	0	0	0	0	0	1 (4)	0
42	FW	ENG	~~David Bremang~~ †	0 (3)	0	0	0	0 (1)	0	2	1	2 (4)	1
42	FW	ENG	Jedidiah Brown	0	0	0	0	0	0	0	0	0	0
44	DF	IRL	Mazeed Ogungbo *	15 (8)	1	0	0	2	0	1 (1)	0	18 (9)	1
45	MF	JAM	~~Mark Marshall~~ †	0	0	0	0	0 (1)	0	2 (1)	1	2 (2)	1
45	MF	JAM	Anthony Grant	2 (8)	0	0	0	0	0	0	0	2 (8)	0
50	FW	ENG	Caleb Chukwuemeka *	5 (5)	0	0 (1)	0	1	0	1 (1)	0	7 (7)	0
