= Florian Kastrati =

Albanian footballer (born 2002)

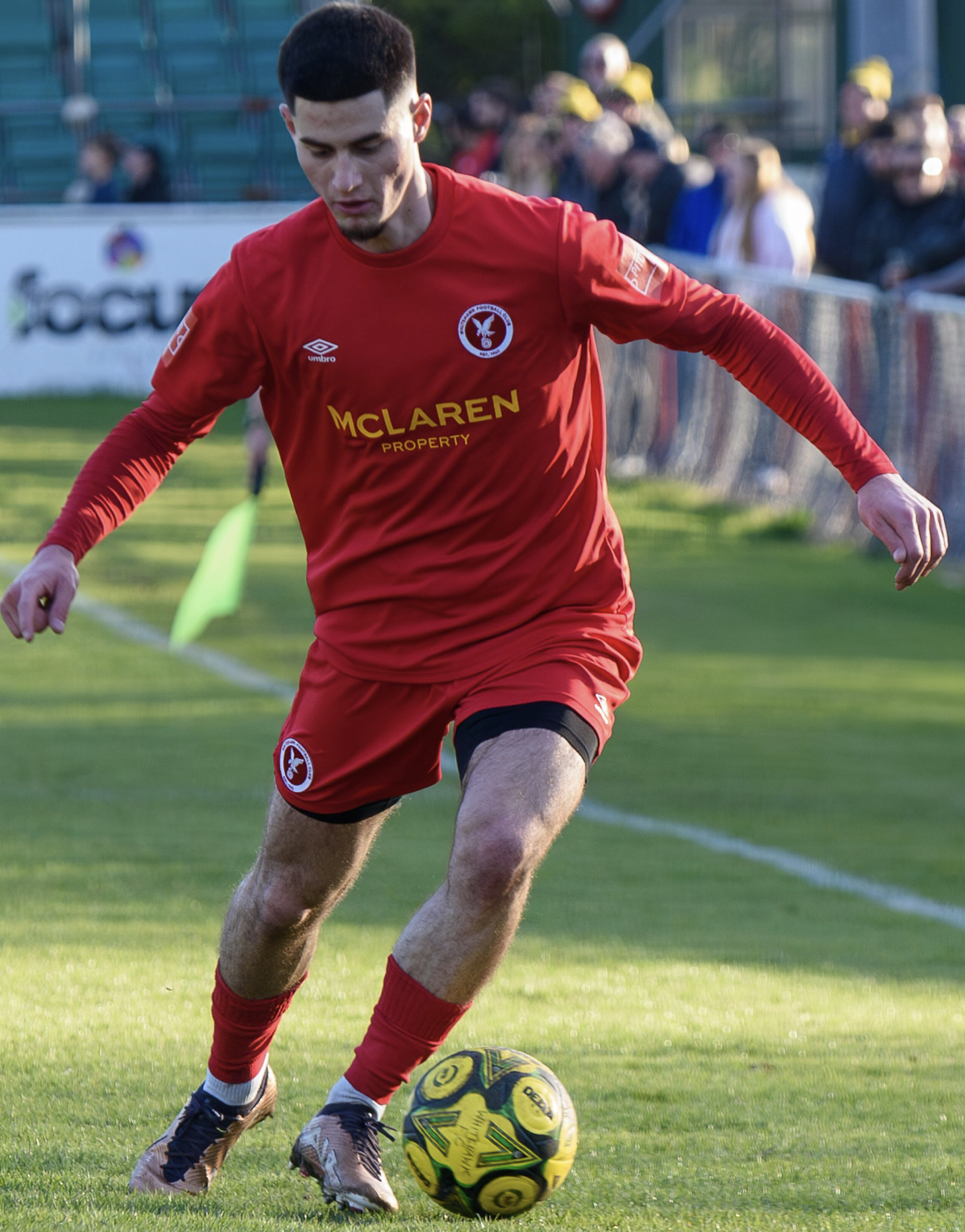
- Kastrati playing for Whitehawk in 2026

Personal information
- Full name: Florian Kastrati
- Date of birth: 2 July 2002 (age 24)
- Place of birth: Inverness, Scotland
- Position: Midfielder

Team information
- Current team: Whitehawk

Youth career
- Crawley Performance Academy

Senior career*
Years	Team	Apps	(Gls)
2021–2024	Crawley Town	1	(0)
2021–2022	→ Kings Langley (loan)	5	(0)
2022–2023	→ Eastbourne Borough (loan)	5	(0)
2023	→ Bognor Regis Town (loan)	6	(2)
2023	→ Cheshunt (loan)	2	(0)
2024	→ Kingstonian (loan)	3	(0)
2024	Carshalton Athletic	6	(0)
2024–2025	Welwyn Garden City	3	(0)
2025	Canvey Island	6	(0)
2025-	Whitehawk	15	(1)
- * Club domestic league appearances and goals as of 13;30 5 April 2026 (UTC)

Florian Kastrati (born 2 July 2002) is an Albanian professional footballer who plays as a midfielder for Whitehawk.

== Career ==
On 14 December 2021, Kastrati signed his first professional contract with Crawley Town after a successful period with the Crawley Performance Academy and was immediately loaned out to Kings Langley of the Southern League Premier Division Central. He played seven games for Kings Langley. He made his first-team debut for Crawley on 7 May 2022, in a 3–3 draw at Oldham Athletic, having come on as an 87th-minute substitute for James Tilley in the last EFL League Two game of the 2021–22 season. On 11 February 2023, it was announced that Kastrati would join Eastbourne Borough on loan until the end of the season. Kastrati's loan at Borough was cut short when, on 14 March 2023, he was recalled and was immediately sent out on loan again, joining Bognor Regis Town until the end of the season. On his debut for Bognor Kastrati scored five minutes into the game.

On 30 November 2023, Kastrati joined Cheshunt on a month-long loan.

Kastrati made 5 league and cup appearances for Kingstonian in January and February 2024 after joining on a month's loan.

On 24 May 2024, Crawley announced Kastrati would be released in the summer when his contract expired.

In October 2024, Kastrati joined Isthmian League Premier Division side Carshalton Athletic.

On 28 December 2024, Kastrati signed for Welwyn Garden City of the Southern League Division One Central.

Kastrati made 7 league and cup appearances for Canvey Island in January and February 2025.

Kastrati took part in the inaugural 2025 edition of the televised six-a-side football competition Baller League as part of VZN FC managed by TBJZL.

Kastrati joined Whitehawk in August 2025.

== Career statistics ==
As of match played 4 March 2023

Appearances and goals by club, season and competition
Club	Season	League			FA Cup		EFL Cup		Other		Total	
Club	Season	Division	Apps	Goals	Apps	Goals	Apps	Goals	Apps	Goals	Apps	Goals
Crawley Town	2021–22	EFL League Two	1	0	0	0	0	0	0	0	1	0
Crawley Town	2022–23	EFL League Two	0	0	0	0	0	0	0	0	0	0
Crawley Town	Total		1	0	0	0	0	0	0	0	1	0
Kings Langley (loan)	2022–23	Southern League; Premier Division Central	5	0	0	0	—		2 (Note: 1 appearance in the FA Trophy and 1 appearance in the Hertfordshire Senior Cup)	0	7	0
Eastbourne Borough (loan)	2022–23	National League South	5	0	0	0	—		0	0	5	0
Career total			11	0	0	0	0	0	2	0	13	0
