= 2013–14 AFC Wimbledon season =

AFC Wimbledon
2013–14 season
- Chairman: Erik Samuelson
- Manager: Neal Ardley
- League Two: 20th
- Football League Cup: First Round v Millwall
- FA Cup: First Round v Coventry City
- Football League Trophy: First Round v Brentford
- Top goalscorer: League: Michael Smith 9 All: Michael Smith 10
- Highest home attendance: 4,763 v Plymouth Argyle (29 December 2013)
- Lowest home attendance: 3,424 v Chesterfield (11 March 2014)
- Average home league attendance: 4,135
Home colours	Away colours	Third colours

The 2013–2014 season was AFC Wimbledon's twelfth season since formation in 2002 and the club's third consecutive season in Football League Two.

== League table ==
Pos	Team	Pld	W	D	L	GF	GA	GD	Pts
18	Morecambe	46	13	15	18	52	64	−12	54
19	Hartlepool United	46	14	11	21	50	56	−6	53
20	AFC Wimbledon	46	14	14	18	49	57	−8	53 (Note: On 28 April AFC Wimbledon were deducted 3 points for fielding an ineligible player.)
21	Northampton Town	46	13	14	19	42	57	−15	53
22	Wycombe Wanderers	46	12	14	20	46	54	−8	50

Updated to match(es) played on 3 May 2014. Source: BBC Sport
Rules for classification: 1) Points; 2) Goal difference; 3) Number of goals scored

== Results summary ==
Round	1	2	3	4	5	6	7	8	9	10	11	12	13	14	15	16	17	18	19	20	21	22	23	24	25	26	27	28	29	30	31	32	33	34	35	36	37	38	39	40	41	42	43	44	45	46
Ground	A	H	A	H	H	A	A	H	A	H	H	A	A	H	A	H	A	H	A	H	A	H	H	A	A	H	A	H	H	A	H	A	H	A	H	H	A	H	A	A	H	A	H	A	H	A
Result	D	W	L	W	W	W	L	W	L	L	D	D	L	L	W	W	D	D	L	D	L	D	L	W	L	D	W	W	L	L	L	L	W	D	L	D	D	W	D	L	D	W	D	W	L	L
Position	13	7	12	8	4	3	7	3	7	11	11	11	15	15	15	9	10	10	12	12	16	15	15	14	15	15	11	9	10	12	14	16	11	12	16	15	15	15	13	16	17	14	14	14	14	20

Updated to match(es) played on 7 May 2014. Source: BBC Sport
A = Away; H = Home; W = Win; D = Draw; L = Loss

Overall								Home						Away					
Pld	W	D	L	GF	GA	GD	Pts	W	D	L	GF	GA	GD	W	D	L	GF	GA	GD
46	14	14	18	49	57	−8	56	8	7	8	27	29	−2	6	7	10	22	28	−6

Last updated: 7 May 2014.
Source: BBC Sport

== Match results ==
=== Pre-season Friendlies ===
6 July 2013	Dartford	2–2	AFC Wimbledon	Princes Park
15:00 BST (UTC+01)	Bradbrook 79', 87'	Report	Fenlon 29'; Weston 30'	Attendance: 881

13 July 2013	AFC Wimbledon	2–0	FC United of Manchester	The Cherry Red Records Stadium
15:00 BST (UTC+01)	L. Moore 45'; Pell 67'	Report		Attendance: 1,292

17 July 2013	AFC Wimbledon	1–1	Charlton Athletic	The Cherry Red Records Stadium
19:45 BST (UTC+01)	Bennett 30'	Report	Green 20'	Attendance: 1,402

20 July 2013	Walton Casuals	0–1	AFC Wimbledon	Waterside Stadium
12:00 BST (UTC+01)		Report	Jacquart 72'

20 July 2013	Sutton United	0–4	AFC Wimbledon	Gander Green Lane
15:00 BST (UTC+01)		Report	Midson 31'; Pell 40'; Beere 66', 79'	Attendance: 857

27 July 2013	A.C. Monza Brianza 1912	3–0	AFC Wimbledon	Stadio Brianteo
19:45 CET (UTC+01)	Franchino 43'; Finotto 58'; Martin 65'	Report	Sweeney (red card)

=== League Two ===
3 August 2013 1	Torquay United	1–1	AFC Wimbledon	Plainmoor
15:00 BST (UTC+01)	Pearce (yellow card) 45'; Downes 90+3'	Report	Pell 88'	Attendance: 3,441; Referee: Tim Robinson

10 August 2013 2	AFC Wimbledon	1–0	Wycombe Wanderers	Kingsmeadow
15:00 BST (UTC+01)	L. Moore 38'	Report	Lewis (red card) 34'; Morgan (yellow card) 57'	Attendance: 4,235; Referee: Gavin Ward

17 August 2013 3	Exeter City	2–0	AFC Wimbledon	St James Park
15:00 BST (UTC+01)	O'Flynn 11', 36'; Coles (yellow card) 32'; Doherty (yellow card) 72'	Report	Pell (yellow card) 74'; L. Moore (yellow card) 75'	Attendance: 3,881; Referee: Graham Horwood

24 August 2013 4	AFC Wimbledon	3–2	Scunthorpe United	Kingsmeadow
15:00 BST (UTC+01)	Pell (yellow card) 24' (goal) 75'; Smith 62'; S. Moore (yellow card) 78'; Frampton (yellow card) 83'; Arthur 87'	Report	Winnall 16'; Iwelumo 31'; Canavan (yellow card) 72'; McAllister (yellow card) 86'	Attendance: 3,865; Referee: Richard Clark

31 August 2013 5	AFC Wimbledon	2–0	Fleetwood Town	Kingsmeadow
15:00 BST (UTC+01)	Pell 42' (pen.); Smith 45+2'; Porter (yellow card) 62'	Report	Roberts (yellow card) 34'; Schumacher (yellow card) 83'	Attendance: 3,744; Referee: Iain Williamson

7 September 2013 6	York City	0–2	AFC Wimbledon	Bootham Crescent
15:00 BST (UTC+01)	Montrose (yellow card) 82'	Report	Smith 31', 73'; Porter (yellow card) 67'; L. Moore (yellow card) 85'	Attendance: 3,530; Referee: Fred Graham

14 September 2013 7	Chesterfield	2–0	AFC Wimbledon	Proact Stadium
15:00 BST (UTC+01)	Roberts 30'; Hird 53'; Gnanduillet (yellow card) 90+5'	Report	Pell (yellow card) 90+5'	Attendance: 6,353; Referee: Eddie Ilderton

21 September 2013 8	AFC Wimbledon	3–1	Burton Albion	Kingsmeadow
15:00 BST (UTC+01)	Smith 55'; Midson 69'; Frampton 74'	Report	Holness (red card) 20'; McGurk 30'	Attendance: 4,005; Referee: Mick Russell

28 September 2013 9	Cheltenham Town	1–0	AFC Wimbledon	Whaddon Road
15:00 BST (UTC+01)	Noble (yellow card) 72'; Cureton 90+5'	Report		Attendance: 3,032; Referee: Darren Drysdale

5 October 2013 10	AFC Wimbledon	0–2	Northampton Town	Kingsmeadow
15:00 BST (UTC+01)	S. Moore (yellow card) 44'; Porter (yellow card) 79'	Report	Reid (yellow card) 13'; Collins 20' (yellow card) 90'; O'Donovan (yellow card) 48'; Hackett (yellow card) 55'; Amankwaah (yellow card) 67'; Dallas 73'	Attendance: 4,222; Referee: Andy D'Urso

12 October 2013 11	AFC Wimbledon	1–1	Accrington Stanley	Kingsmeadow
15:00 BST (UTC+01)	L. Moore (yellow card) 29'; Midson (yellow card) 45+5'; Weston (yellow card) 57'; Bennett 86'	Report	Odejayi 17' (red card) 45+5'; Joyce (yellow card) 64'; Bettinelli (yellow card) 90+5'	Attendance: 4,585; Referee: Garry Sutton

19 October 2013 12	Morecambe	1–1	AFC Wimbledon	Globe Arena
15:00 BST (UTC+01)	Ellison 8'; Drummond (yellow card) 45+9'; Threlfall (yellow card) 63'	Report	Pell (yellow card) 45+9'; Smith (yellow card) 49' (goal) 52'; Fenlon (yellow card) 58'	Attendance: 2,149; Referee: Scott Duncan

22 October 2013 13	Hartlepool United	3–1	AFC Wimbledon	Victoria Park
15:00 BST (UTC+01)	Walton 32' (pen.) (yellow card) 74'; Monkhouse (yellow card) 42'; James 72'; Dolan 83'	Report	Pell 66' (pen.); Sweeney (yellow card) 90'	Attendance: 3,652; Referee: Darren Bond

26 October 2013 14	AFC Wimbledon	0–2	Oxford United	Kingsmeadow
15:00 BST (UTC+01)		Report	Constable 6'; Newey (yellow card) 40'; Smalley 82' (pen.)	Attendance: 4,685; Referee: Dean Whitestone

2 November 2013 15	Rochdale	1–2	AFC Wimbledon	Spotland Stadium
15:00 GMT	Done (yellow card) 30'; Allen 35'; Rose (yellow card) 82'	Report	S. Moore 54' (yellow card) 69'; Frampton 84'; Fuller (yellow card) 90+4'	Attendance: 2,483; Referee: Iain Williamson

16 November 2013 16	AFC Wimbledon	4–0	Portsmouth	Kingsmeadow
15:00 GMT	Pell (yellow card) 25'; Frampton 34', 74'; Fuller (yellow card) 37'; S. Moore 82'; Smith 90+1'	Report	Carson (yellow card) 22'; Ferry (yellow card) 66'; Bradley (yellow card) 86'	Attendance: 4,605; Referee: Robert Lewis

23 November 2013 17	Bury	1–1	AFC Wimbledon	Gigg Lane
15:00 GMT	Hylton 35'; Procter (yellow card) 54'	Report	Bennett (yellow card) 22'; L. Moore (yellow card) 39' (goal) 66'	Attendance: 2,775; Referee: Mick Russell

26 November 2013 18	AFC Wimbledon	1–1	Dagenham & Redbridge	Kingsmeadow
19:45 GMT	Smith 28'; Kennedy (yellow card) 90+4'	Report	Murphy 58'	Attendance: 3,862; Referee: Steve Bratt

30 November 2013 19	Bristol Rovers	3–0	AFC Wimbledon	Memorial Stadium
15:00 GMT	Clarkson 19'; Parkes 31'; Harrold 89' (pen.)	Report	Sweeney (yellow card) 18'; S. Moore (yellow card) 41' (yellow card) 82' (red card); Porter (yellow card) 63'; Mohamed (yellow card) 76'; Pell (yellow card) 87'	Attendance: 5,860; Referee: Gavin Ward

14 December 2013 20	AFC Wimbledon	0–0	Mansfield Town	Kingsmeadow
15:00 GMT	Porter (yellow card) 87'	Report		Attendance: 3,900; Referee: Michael Bull

26 December 2013 21	AFC Wimbledon	0–1	Southend United	Kingsmeadow
15:00 GMT	S. Moore (yellow card) 24'; Sheringham (yellow card) 28'; Francomb (red card) 41'	Report	Atkinson (yellow card) 37'; Woodrow 76'; Straker (yellow card) 82'; Eastwood (yellow card) 87'	Attendance: 4,561; Referee: Graham Scott

29 December 2013 22	AFC Wimbledon	1–1	Plymouth Argyle	Kingsmeadow
15:00 GMT	Smith 47'; Midson (yellow card) 76'	Report	Berry (yellow card) 75'; Reid 88'	Attendance: 4,763; Referee: Andy Woolmer

1 January 2014 23	Dagenham & Redbridge	1–0	AFC Wimbledon	Victoria Road
15:00 GMT	Ogogo 10'; D'Ath (yellow card) 45+2' (yellow card) 57' (red card); Murphy (yellow card) 62'; Dickson (yellow card) 90+5'	Report	Antwi (yellow card) 67'	Attendance: 2,012; Referee: James Linington

4 January 2014 24	Wycombe Wanderers	0–3	AFC Wimbledon	Adams Park
15:00 GMT	Lewis (yellow card) 58'; Stewart (yellow card) 79' (yellow card) 81' (red card)	Report	Bennett (yellow card) 42'; Antwi (yellow card) 49'; Wyke 52'; S. Moore 76'; Midson 82' (pen.); Fenlon (red card) 90+1'	Attendance: 3,513; Referee: David Phillips

11 January 2014 25	AFC Wimbledon	0–2	Torquay United	Kingsmeadow
15:00 GMT	S. Moore (yellow card) 41'; Fuller (yellow card) 90+1'	Report	Pearce 29'; Mansell (yellow card) 32'; Stockley 43'; Nicholson (yellow card) 54'; Lathrope (yellow card) 74'	Attendance: 4,339; Referee: Darren Deadman

18 January 2014 26	Scunthorpe United	0–0	AFC Wimbledon	Glanford Park
15:00 GMT	Ribeiro (yellow card) 52'	Report	Francomb (yellow card) 60'	Attendance: 4,326; Referee: Paul Tierney

25 January 2014 27	AFC Wimbledon	2–1	Exeter City	Kingsmeadow
15:00 GMT	L. Moore (yellow card) 21' (goal) 37'; S. Moore (yellow card) 45+3'; Midson 74'	Report	Midson 4' (o.g.)	Attendance: 4,410; Referee: Steven Rushton

28 January 2014 28	AFC Wimbledon	2–1	Hartlepool United	Kingsmeadow
19:45 GMT	Pell (yellow card) 70'; S. Moore (yellow card) 72'; Antwi 74'; Hylton 76'; Arthur (yellow card) 85'	Report	James 44'; Walton (yellow card) 58'; Baldwin (yellow card) 88'	Attendance: 3,730; Referee: Mark Haywood

1 February 2014 29	Oxford United	2–1	AFC Wimbledon	Kassam Stadium
15:00 GMT	Newey 39'; Connolly 56'	Report	Wyke 75'	Attendance: 5,748; Referee: Andy D'Urso

8 February 2014 30	AFC Wimbledon	0–3	Rochdale	Kingsmeadow
15:00 GMT	Pell (yellow card) 39'	Report	Hogan 66', 79' 82'	Attendance: 3,837; Referee: Oliver Langford

15 February 2014 31	Portsmouth	1–0	AFC Wimbledon	Fratton Park
15:00 GMT	Taylor 52'; Painter (yellow card) 90+1'	Report		Attendance: 15,742; Referee: Stuart Attwell

22 February 2014 32	AFC Wimbledon	0–1	Bury	Kingsmeadow
15:00 GMT	S. Moore (yellow card) 13'; Hylton (yellow card) 41'; Collins (yellow card) 58'	Report	Tutte (yellow card) 34'; Veseli (yellow card) 41'; Platt (yellow card) 90'; Mayor 90+4'	Attendance: 3,740; Referee: Keith Hill

25 February 2014 33	Newport County	1–2	AFC Wimbledon	Rodney Parade
19:45 GMT	Worner 65' (o.g.)	Report	Antwi (yellow card) 79'; Sheringham 85'; Sainte-Luce 88'	Attendance: 2,666; Referee: Tim Robinson

1 March 2014 34	Fleetwood Town	0–0	AFC Wimbledon	Highbury Stadium
15:00 GMT	Morris (yellow card) 78'	Report		Attendance: 2,420; Referee: Nigel Miller

8 March 2014 35	AFC Wimbledon	0–1	York City	Kingsmeadow
15:00 GMT	Collins (yellow card) 46'; Antwi (yellow card) 52'	Report	Coulson 41'	Attendance: 4,182; Referee: Brendan Malone

11 March 2014 36	AFC Wimbledon	1–1	Chesterfield	Kingsmeadow
19:45 GMT	Francomb 50' (yellow card) 52'; Morris (yellow card) 80'	Report	Doyle (yellow card) 41'; Banks 55'	Attendance: 3,424; Referee: Darren Deadman

15 March 2014 37	Burton Albion	1–1	AFC Wimbledon	Pirelli Stadium
15:00 GMT	Kee 22' (pen.)	Report	Jones (yellow card) 27' (goal) 90+8'; S. Moore (yellow card) 63'; Frampton (yellow card) 84'	Attendance: 2,592; Referee: Dean Whitestone

22 March 2014 38	AFC Wimbledon	4–3	Cheltenham Town	Kingsmeadow
15:00 GMT	Collins (yellow card) 28'; Jones (yellow card) 33'; S. Moore (yellow card) 50'; Hylton 69', 71' (yellow card) 72'; Nicholson 70'; Midson 90+7'	Report	Brown 5'; McGlashan (yellow card) 43' (goal) 49'; Harrison (yellow card) 44'; Taylor 74' (yellow card) 90+3'	Attendance: 3,670; Referee: Jeremy Simpson

25 March 2014 39	Northampton Town	2–2	AFC Wimbledon	Sixfields Stadium
15:00 GMT	Carter 29' (pen.), 79'; Hackett (yellow card) 51'	Report	Francomb 14'; Midson (red card) 28'; Collins (yellow card) 89'; Morris (yellow card) 90+2'; S. Moore 90+6'	Attendance: 3,812; Referee: Michael Bull

29 March 2014 40	Mansfield Town	1–0	AFC Wimbledon	Field Mill
15:00 GMT	Murray 7' (yellow card) 88'; Howell (yellow card) 12'; Rhead (yellow card) 72'	Report	Wyke (yellow card) 45+5'; S. Moore (yellow card) 65'; Morris (yellow card) 88'	Attendance: 3,292; Referee: Robert Lewis

5 April 2014 41	AFC Wimbledon	0–0	Bristol Rovers	Kingsmeadow
15:00 GMT		Report	McChrystal (yellow card) 72'	Attendance: 4,322; Referee: Tim Robinson

12 April 2014 42	Southend United	0–1	AFC Wimbledon	Roots Hall
15:00 GMT	Coker (yellow card) 55'; Egan (yellow card) 57'	Report	Midson 58' (pen.); Appiah (yellow card) 59'; Francomb (yellow card) 78'	Attendance: 7,627; Referee: Andy Madley

18 April 2014 43	AFC Wimbledon	2–2	Newport County	Kingsmeadow
15:00 GMT	Appiah 49'; Francomb 69'	Report	Zebroski 15'; Flynn 47' (pen.); Minshull (yellow card) 48'; Feely (yellow card) 66'; Sandell (yellow card) 90+5'	Attendance: 4,398; Referee: Andy Woolmer

21 April 2014 44	Plymouth Argyle	1–2	AFC Wimbledon	Home Park
15:00 GMT	Hourihane 7'; Wotton (yellow card) 41'; Reid (yellow card) 68'	Report	Moore (yellow card) 36'; Midson 42'; Appiah 59' (yellow card) 90+2'	Attendance: 6,618; Referee: Keith Hill

26 April 2014 45	AFC Wimbledon	0–3	Morecambe	Kingsmeadow
15:00 GMT	Hylton (yellow card) 78'; L. Moore (yellow card) 90'	Report	Edwards (yellow card) 39'; Redshaw 43'; Devitt 44'; Amond 90+2' (pen.)	Attendance: 4,017; Referee: Steve Martin

3 May 2014 46	Accrington Stanley	3–2	AFC Wimbledon	Crown Ground
15:00 GMT	Odejayi 6' (yellow card) 76'; Gray 19', 47'; Bettinelli (yellow card) 90'	Report	Jones (yellow card) 54'; Midson 73' (pen.); Appian 89'	Attendance: 1,888; Referee: Mark Brown

=== FA Cup ===
8 November 2013 First Round	AFC Wimbledon	1–3	Coventry City	Kingsmeadow
20:00 GMT	Smith 54'	Report	Wilson 57'; Baker 60'; Christie (yellow card) 68'; Kennedy 70' (o.g.)	Attendance: 3,379; Referee: Darren Drysdale

=== Football League Cup ===
6 August 2013 First Round	Millwall	2–1	AFC Wimbledon	The Den
19:45 BST (UTC+01)	Keogh 52'; Woolford 76'	Report	L. Moore 90'	Attendance: 4,443; Referee: James Linington

=== Football League Trophy ===
3 September 2013 First Round	Brentford	5–3	AFC Wimbledon	Griffin Park
19:00 BST (UTC+01)	El Alagui 42', 54'; Hacker 52'; Nugent 64'; Venta 69'	Report	Fenlon 56'; Francomb 82'; Sweeney 90'	Attendance: 4,189; Referee: Lee Collins

== Player statistics ==
=== Appearances and goals ===
As of 7 May 2014.

No.	Pos	Nat	Player	Total		League Two		FA Cup		League Cup		JP Trophy	
No.	Pos	Nat	Player	Apps	Goals	Apps	Goals	Apps	Goals	Apps	Goals	Apps	Goals
1	GK	(England) ENG	Ross Worner	47	0	45	0	0	0	1	0	1	0
2	DF	(England) ENG	Barry Fuller	48	0	45	0	1	0	1	0	0+1	0
3	DF	(England) ENG	Callum Kennedy	25	0	21+1	0	1	0	1	0	1	0
5	DF	(England) ENG	Andy Frampton	33	4	31	4	1	0	1	0	0	0
6	DF	(Ireland) EIR	Alan Bennett	34	1	32	1	1	0	1	0	0	0
7	MF	(England) ENG	George Francomb	36	4	28+5	3	1	0	1	0	1	1
8	MF	(England) ENG	Sammy Moore	43	4	40	4	1	0	1	0	1	0
12	MF	(England) ENG	Harry Pell	35	4	26+6	4	1	0	1	0	0+1	0
15	DF	(England) ENG	Jim Fenlon	19	1	14+4	0	0	0	0	0	1	1
16	MF	(France) FRA	Kevin Sainte-Luce	24	1	3+20	1	0	0	0	0	1	0
18	FW	(England) ENG	Charlie Sheringham	16	1	8+7	1	0	0	1	0	0	0
19	MF	(England) ENG	Chris Arthur	28	1	2+24	1	0	0	0+1	0	1	0
20	GK	(England) ENG	Ashley Bayes	0	0	0	0	0	0	0	0	0	0
25	MF	(England) ENG	Chace Jacquart	0	0	0	0	0	0	0	0	0	0
27	DF	(Wales) WAL	Aaron Morris	17	0	15+2	0	0	0	0	0	0	0
28	DF	(Wales) WAL	Darren Jones	18	1	17+1	1	0	0	0	0	0	0
29	MF	(England) ENG	Jake Nicholson	4	1	3+1	1	0	0	0	0	0	0
30	MF	(England) ENG	Tom Beere	0	0	0	0	0	0	0	0	0	0
31	DF	(England) ENG	Charlie Fayers	0	0	0	0	0	0	0	0	0	0
32	DF	(England) ENG	Will Nightingale	0	0	0	0	0	0	0	0	0	0
33	MF	(England) ENG	Harry Cooksley	0	0	0	0	0	0	0	0	0	0
34	FW	(England) ENG	George Oakley	0	0	0	0	0	0	0	0	0	0
Players who featured on loan for AFC Wimbledon but subsequently returned to their parent club:
9	FW	(England) ENG	Michael Smith	25	10	23	9	1	1	0	0	1	0
9	FW	(England) ENG	Danny Hylton	17	3	10+7	3	0	0	0	0	0	0
21	FW	(England) ENG	George Porter	24	0	17+4	0	1	0	1	0	0+1	0
23	DF	(Ireland) EIR	Kevin Feely	0	0	0	0	0	0	0	0	0	0
26	FW	(England) ENG	Charlie Wyke	17	2	11+6	2	0	0	0	0	0	0
35	MF	(Ireland) EIR	Michael Collins	9	0	9	0	0	0	0	0	0	0
39	FW	(Wales) WAL	Kaid Mohamed	5	0	5	0	0	0	0	0	0	0
36	DF	(England) ENG	Tom Richards	10	0	9+1	0	0	0	0	0	0	0
37	FW	(England) ENG	Kwesi Appiah	7	3	6+1	3	0	0	0	0	0	0
Players who were released by the club at the end of the season:
4	MF	(Scotland) SCO	Peter Sweeney	25	1	18+4	0	1	0	1	0	1	1
10	FW	(England) ENG	Jack Midson	40	7	19+18	7	0+1	0	0+1	0	1	0
11	FW	(England) ENG	Luke Moore	34	4	24+8	3	0+1	0	0+1	1	0	0
14	DF	(Ghana) GHA	Will Antwi	18	1	13+5	1	0	0	0	0	0	0
17	FW	(England) ENG	Charlie Strutton	3	0	1+2	0	0	0	0	0	0	0
22	GK	(England) ENG	Seb Brown	2	0	1	0	1	0	0	0	0	0
24	DF	(Wales) WAL	Rhys Weston	8	0	6+1	0	0	0	0	0	1	0

=== Top scorers ===
Place	Position	Nation	Number	Name	League Two	FA Cup	League Cup	JP Trophy	Total
1	FW	(England)	9	Michael Smith	9	1	0	0	10
2	FW	(England)	10	Jack Midson	7	0	0	0	7
3	DF	(England)	5	Andy Frampton	4	0	0	0	4
=	MF	(England)	8	Sammy Moore	4	0	0	0	4
=	MF	(England)	12	Harry Pell	4	0	0	0	4
=	MF	(England)	7	George Francomb	3	0	0	1	4
=	FW	(England)	11	Luke Moore	3	0	1	0	4
3	FW	(England)	9	Danny Hylton	3	0	0	0	3
=	FW	(England)	37	Kwesi Appiah	3	0	0	0	3
4	FW	(England)	26	Charlie Wyke	2	0	0	0	2
5	DF	(Republic of Ireland)	6	Alan Bennett	1	0	0	0	1
=	DF	(Ghana)	14	Will Antwi	1	0	0	0	1
=	MF	(France)	16	Kevin Sainte-Luce	1	0	0	0	1
=	FW	(England)	18	Charlie Sheringham	1	0	0	0	1
=	MF	(England)	19	Chris Arthur	1	0	0	0	1
=	DF	(Wales)	28	Darren Jones	1	0	0	0	1
=	MF	(England)	29	Jake Nicholson	1	0	0	0	1
=	MF	(Scotland)	4	Peter Sweeney	0	0	0	1	1
=	DF	(England)	15	Jim Fenlon	0	0	0	1	1
				TOTALS	49	1	1	3	54

=== Disciplinary record ===
Number	Position	Nation	Name	League Two		FA Cup		League Cup		JP Trophy		Total	
Number	Position	Nation	Name	Yellow card	Red card	Yellow card	Red card	Yellow card	Red card	Yellow card	Red card	Yellow card	Red card
2	DF	(England)	Barry Fuller	3	0	0	0	0	0	0	0	3	0
3	DF	(England)	Callum Kennedy	1	0	0	0	0	0	0	0	1	0
4	MF	(Scotland)	Peter Sweeney	2	0	0	0	0	0	0	0	2	0
5	DF	(England)	Andy Frampton	2	0	0	0	0	0	0	0	2	0
6	DF	(Republic of Ireland)	Alan Bennett	2	0	0	0	0	0	0	0	2	0
7	MF	(England)	George Francomb	3	1	0	0	0	0	0	0	3	1
8	MF	(England)	Sammy Moore	14	1	0	0	0	0	0	0	14	1
9	FW	(England)	Michael Smith	1	0	0	0	0	0	0	0	1	0
9	FW	(England)	Danny Hylton	3	0	0	0	0	0	0	0	3	0
10	FW	(England)	Jack Midson	2	1	0	0	0	0	0	0	2	1
11	FW	(England)	Luke Moore	6	0	0	0	0	0	0	0	6	0
12	MF	(England)	Harry Pell	8	0	0	0	0	0	0	0	8	0
14	DF	(Ghana)	Will Antwi	4	0	0	0	0	0	0	0	4	0
15	DF	(England)	Jim Fenlon	1	1	0	0	0	0	0	0	1	1
18	FW	(England)	Charlie Sheringham	1	0	0	0	0	0	0	0	1	0
19	MF	(England)	Chris Arthur	1	0	0	0	0	0	0	0	1	0
21	FW	(England)	George Porter	5	0	0	0	0	0	0	0	5	0
24	DF	(Wales)	Rhys Weston	1	0	0	0	0	0	0	0	1	0
26	FW	(England)	Charlie Wyke	1	0	0	0	0	0	0	0	1	0
27	DF	(Wales)	Aaron Morris	3	0	0	0	0	0	0	0	3	0
27	DF	(Wales)	Darren Jones	3	0	0	0	0	0	0	0	3	0
35	MF	(Republic of Ireland)	Michael Collins	4	0	0	0	0	0	0	0	4	0
37	FW	(England)	Kwesi Appiah	2	0	0	0	0	0	0	0	2	0
39	FW	(Wales)	Kaid Mohamed	1	0	0	0	0	0	0	0	1	0
			TOTALS	74	4	0	0	0	0	0	0	74	4

== Transfers ==
Players Transferred In
Date	Position	Nation	Name	Previous club	Fee	Ref.
28 May 2013	MF	(England)	Chris Arthur	Havant & Waterlooville	Undisclosed	
28 May 2013	DF	(England)	Barry Fuller	Barnet	Free	
20 June 2013	GK	(England)	Ashley Bayes	Basingstoke Town	Free	
21 June 2013	GK	(England)	Ross Worner	Aldershot Town	Free	
21 June 2013	FW	(England)	Charlie Sheringham	Bournemouth	Free	
26 June 2013	MF	(England)	George Francomb	Norwich City	Free	
28 June 2013	DF	(England)	Andy Frampton	Gillingham	Free	
4 July 2013	DF	(England)	Callum Kennedy	Scunthorpe United	Free	
7 August 2013	DF	(Wales)	Rhys Weston	Sabah FA	Free	
19 September 2013	MF	(England)	Harry Cooksley	Aldershot Town	Free	
10 January 2014	DF	(Wales)	Aaron Morris	Aldershot Town	Free	
23 January 2014	DF	(Wales)	Darren Jones	Shrewsbury Town	Free	
19 February 2014	MF	(England)	Jake Nicholson	Greenock Morton	Free	
Players Loaned In
Date from	Position	Nation	Name	From	Date to	Ref.
19 July 2013	FW	(England)	George Porter	Burnley	24 January 2014	
30 July 2013	FW	(England)	Michael Smith	Charlton Athletic	1 January 2014	
11 November 2013	FW	(Wales)	Kaid Mohamed	Port Vale	4 January 2014	
25 November 2013	DF	(Republic of Ireland)	Kevin Feely	Charlton Athletic	11 December 2013	
3 January 2014	FW	(England)	Charlie Wyke	Middlesbrough	5 April 2014	
27 January 2014	FW	(England)	Danny Hylton	Rotherham United	End of the Season	
20 February 2014	MF	(Republic of Ireland)	Michael Collins	Scunthorpe United	3 April 2014	
28 February 2014	DF	(England)	Tom Richards	Fulham	End of the Season	
27 March 2014	FW	(England)	Kwesi Appiah	Crystal Palace	End of the Season	
Players Loaned Out
Date from	Position	Nation	Name	To	Date to	Ref.
19 September 2013	FW	(England)	Charlie Strutton	Braintree Town	21 October 2013	
22 November 2013	FW	(England)	Charlie Strutton	Aldershot Town	25 November 2013	
6 January 2014	DF	(Wales)	Rhys Weston	Sutton United	22 February 2014	
22 March 2014	FW	(England)	Charlie Sheringham	Salisbury City	22 April 2014	
Players Transferred Out
Date	Position	Nation	Name	Subsequent club	Fee	Ref
–	–	-	–	–	–	–
Players Released
Date	Position	Nation	Name	Subsequent club	Join date	Ref
29 May 2013	MF	(England)	Huw Johnson	Staines Town	4 July 2013	
21 June 2013	GK	(Venezuela)	Mikhael Jaimez-Ruiz	Hayes & Yeading United	17 August 2013	
1 July 2013	MF	(England)	Frankie Merrifield	Hayes & Yeading United	15 August 2013	
10 July 2013	DF	(Scotland)	Warren Cummings	Poole Town	16 August 2013	
7 May 2014	GK	(England)	Seb Brown	Bromley	30 May 2014	
7 May 2014	FW	(England)	Jack Midson	Eastleigh	23 May 2014	
7 May 2014	DF	(Ghana)	Will Antwi			
7 May 2014	DF	(Wales)	Rhys Weston			
7 May 2014	MF	(Scotland)	Peter Sweeney			
7 May 2014	FW	(England)	Luke Moore	Margate	27 May 2014	
7 May 2014	FW	(England)	Charlie Strutton	Braintree Town	4 July 2014	
23 May 2014	FW	(England)	Charlie Sheringham	Ebbsfleet United	30 June 2014	
