= Chris Arthur =

English footballer (born 1990)

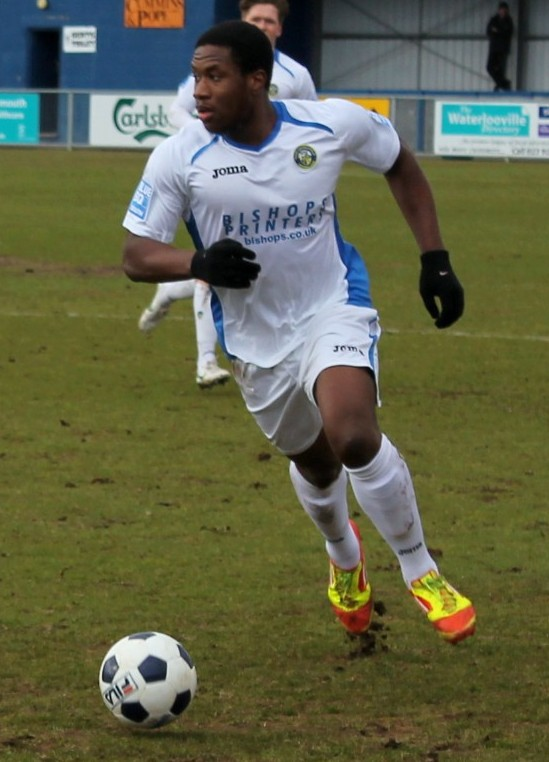
- Arthur playing for Havant & Waterlooville in 2013

Personal information
- Full name: Christopher Anton Arthur
- Date of birth: 25 January 1990 (age 36)
- Place of birth: Enfield, England
- Height: 1.78 m (5 ft 10 in)
- Positions: Left midfielder; left-back

Team information
- Current team: Welling United

Youth career
- –2007: Queens Park Rangers

Senior career*
Years	Team	Apps	(Gls)
2007–2009	Queens Park Rangers	0	(0)
2007–2008	→ Hayes & Yeading United (loan)	4	(0)
2008–2009	→ Kettering Town (loan)	4	(0)
2009	→ Rushden & Diamonds (loan)	2	(0)
2010	Cambridge City	2	(0)
2010	Bishop's Stortford	7	(1)
2010–2011	Rotherham United	0	(0)
2011	Havant & Waterlooville	4	(0)
2011–2012	Northampton Town	7	(0)
2012–2013	Havant & Waterlooville	56	(2)
2013–2015	AFC Wimbledon	26	(1)
2014–2015	→ Woking (loan)	26	(0)
2015–2016	Woking	54	(0)
2016–2017	Crawley Town	6	(0)
2017	→ Woking (loan)	7	(0)
2017	Aldershot Town	13	(0)
2017	→ Whitehawk (loan)	3	(0)
2017–2018	Leatherhead	10	(1)
2018	Kingstonian	13	(0)
2018–2019	New Salamis	11	(1)
2020	Gosport Borough	1	(0)
2020–2023	Ware	64	(2)
2023	Enfield	3	(0)
2023–2025	Sittingbourne	79	(1)
2025–	Welling United	1	(0)
- * Club domestic league appearances and goals as of 12:28, 24 November 2025 (UTC)

Christopher Anton Arthur (born 25 January 1990) is an English professional footballer who plays as a left midfielder or left–back for Isthmian League Premier Division club Welling United.

== Career ==
Arthur was born in Enfield, London. started his career in the youth team of Queens Park Rangers (QPR), and was sent on work experience to Conference South side Hayes & Yeading United in December 2007. In July 2008 he signed his first professional contract for QPR. He was sent out on loan in 2008 to Conference Premier side Kettering Town, where he made four league appearances. He went out on loan again to another Conference outfit in Rushden & Diamonds on a one-month loan deal in March 2009. He made two appearances during his spell at Nene Park. In the summer of 2009, Arthur was released from QPR.

After a short spell playing in Turkey, he returned to the Conference South when he signed for Bishop's Stortford in September 2010. In December 2010, he signed for League Two club Rotherham United on a two-month deal after a successful trial with the club. He failed to make a first-team appearance for the club and was released when his contract expired. In September 2011, he signed for Conference South side Havant & Waterlooville. After making four appearances for the Hawks, he left in October to sign for League Two club Northampton Town on a deal until January 2012.

He made his professional debut for the Cobblers on 8 October 2011, in a 1–0 home defeat to Crawley Town, replacing Ashley Corker in the second half. His first start for the club came a week later in a 3–0 defeat to Port Vale at Vale Park. On Aidy Boothroyd's arrival as Northampton manager, Athur was released having made only seven appearances for the club.

Arthur returned to Havant & Waterlooville in December 2011 before signing a two–year contract in January 2012. During his second spell with the club he made a total of 56 league appearances, scoring two league goals.

On 28 May 2013, Arthur joined AFC Wimbledon on a one-year deal for an undisclosed fee. On 3 August 2013, Arthur made his AFC Wimbledon debut in a 1–1 draw against Torquay United, replacing George Francomb in the 68th minute. He scored his first goal for the Dons when he scored the winner in a 3–2 win over Scunthorpe United.

On 21 August 2014, Arthur joined Conference Premier side Woking on a one-month loan deal after struggling to make an impression in the Wimbledon side. Two days later, Arthur made his Woking debut in a 1–1 draw against Welling United, playing the full 90 minutes.

On 6 January 2015, after numerous loan extensions to his Woking contract, Arthur joined the Cards permanently after his contract was mutually terminated by AFC Wimbledon. Arthur went on to make 17 more appearances before signing on for the 2015/16 campaign.

On 8 June 2016, Arthur joined League Two club Crawley Town on a one-year deal. On 9 August 2016, Arthur made his Crawley Town debut in a 2–1 defeat against Wolverhampton Wanderers in an EFL Cup tie. On 3 September 2016, Arthur made his league debut for Crawley Town in a 3–0 away defeat against Portsmouth, replacing Andre Blackman in the 52nd minute.

On 31 January 2017, Arthur returned to his former side Woking of the National League on loan on a one-month deal. On the same day, Arthur made his Woking return in a 3–0 home defeat against Tranmere Rovers, replacing Macauley Bonne in the 76th minute. On 3 March 2017, Arthur's loan at Woking was extended for a further month.

On 4 August 2017, Arthur signed a deal with National League side Aldershot Town following his release from Crawley. Just over a week later, Arthur made his Aldershot debut during their impressive 6–0 home victory over Guiseley, featuring for the full 90 minutes. He joined Brighton-based National League South side Whitehawk on a month's loan on 7 November 2017. Four days later, Arthur featured for the entire 90 minutes during Whitehawk's 3–1 away defeat against Gloucester City.

On 22 December 2017, following a termination in his Aldershot contract, Arthur joined Isthmian League Premier Division side Leatherhead. He went onto appear ten times, scoring once before making the move to fellow Isthmian League side Kingstonian in March 2018.

Following his release from Kingstonian, Arthur had spells at New Salamis and Gosport Borough. He signed for Ware in the Isthmian League South Central division for the 2020–21 season before it was curtailed in October 2020. Ware transferred to the Southern League Division One Central for the following campaign and Arthur signed on for another season.

On 13 June 2023, Arthur agreed to join Enfield following a three-year spell at Ware. He joined Sittingbourne in September 2023.

In November 2025, Arthur joined Isthmian League Premier Division club Welling United.

== Career statistics ==
As of match played 18 November 2025

Appearances and goals by club, season and competition
Club	Season	League			FA Cup		EFL Cup		Other		Total	
Club	Season	Division	Apps	Goals	Apps	Goals	Apps	Goals	Apps	Goals	Apps	Goals
Queens Park Rangers	2007–08	Championship	0	0	0	0	0	0	—		0	0
Queens Park Rangers	2008–09	Championship	0	0	—		0	0	—		0	0
Queens Park Rangers	Total		0	0	0	0	0	0	—		0	0
Hayes & Yeading United (loan)	2007–08	Conference South	4	0	—		—		—		4	0
Kettering Town (loan)	2008–09	Conference Premier	4	0	2	0	—		0	0	6	0
Rushden & Diamonds (loan)	2008–09	Conference Premier	2	0	—		—		—		2	0
Cambridge City	2009–10	Southern League Premier Division	2	0	—		—		1 (Note: Appearance in the Southern League Cup)	0	3	0
Bishop's Stortford	2010–11	Conference South	7	1	2	0	—		1 (Note: Appearances in the FA Trophy)	1	10	2
Rotherham United	2010–11	League Two	0	0	—		—		—		0	0
Havant & Waterlooville	2011–12	Conference South	4	0	—		—		—		4	0
Northampton Town	2011–12	League Two	7	0	1	0	—		—		8	0
Havant & Waterlooville	2011–12	Conference South	23	0	—		—		—		23	0
Havant & Waterlooville	2012–13	Conference South	33	2	1	0	—		2	0	36	2
Havant & Waterlooville	Total		56	2	1	0	—		2	0	59	2
AFC Wimbledon	2013–14	League Two	26	1	0	0	1	0	1 (Note: Appearance in the Football League Trophy)	0	28	1
AFC Wimbledon	2014–15	League Two	0	0	—		1	0	—		1	0
AFC Wimbledon	Total		26	1	0	0	2	0	1	0	29	1
Woking (loan)	2014–15	Conference Premier	26	0	2	0	—		1	0	29	0
Woking	2014–15	Conference Premier	17	0	—		—		4	1	21	1
Woking	2015–16	National League	37	0	1	0	—		2	1	40	1
Woking	Total		54	0	1	0	—		6	2	61	2
Crawley Town	2016–17	League Two	6	0	1	0	1	0	4 (Note: Appearance in the EFL Trophy)	0	12	0
Woking (loan)	2016–17	National League	7	0	—		—		—		7	0
Aldershot Town	2017–18	National League	13	0	0	0	—		0	0	13	0
Whitehawk (loan)	2017–18	National League South	3	0	—		—		—		3	0
Leatherhead	2017–18	Isthmian League Premier Division	10	1	—		—		—		10	1
Kingstonian	2017–18	Isthmian League Premier Division	13	0	—		—		—		13	0
New Salamis	2018–19	Hertfordshire Senior County League Premier Division	11	1	—		—		3 (Note: One appearance in the Aubrey Cup, two appearances and one goal in the Anagram Records Trophy)	1	14	2
Gosport Borough	2019–20	Southern League Premier Division South	1	0	—		—		—		1	0
Ware	2020–21	Isthmian League South Central Division	3	2	—		—		1	0	4	2
Ware	2021–22	Southern League Division One Central	32	0	6	0	—		3 (Note: One appearance in the FA Trophy, one in the Southern League Cup, one in the Southern League Division One Central play-offs)	0	41	0
Ware	2022–23	Southern League Division One Central	29	0	1	0	—		4 (Note: Two appearances in the FA Trophy, two in the Southern League Division One Central play-offs)	0	34	0
Ware	Total		64	2	7	0	—		8	0	79	2
Enfield	2023–24	Isthmian League North Division	3	0	1	0	—		0	0	4	0
Sittingbourne	2023–24	Isthmian League South East Division	27	0	—		—		1 (Note: Appearance in the Isthmian League South East Division play-offs)	0	28	0
Sittingbourne	2024–25	Isthmian League South East Division	37	0	5	0	—		11 (Note: Nine appearances and one goal in FA Trophy, two appearances in Isthmian League South East Division play-offs)	1	53	1
Sittingbourne	2025–26	Isthmian League South East Division	15	1	2	0	—		2	1	19	2
Sittingbourne	Total		79	1	7	0	—		14	2	100	3
Career total			402	9	25	0	3	0	41	6	471	15
