= Tom Richards (footballer) =

English footballer

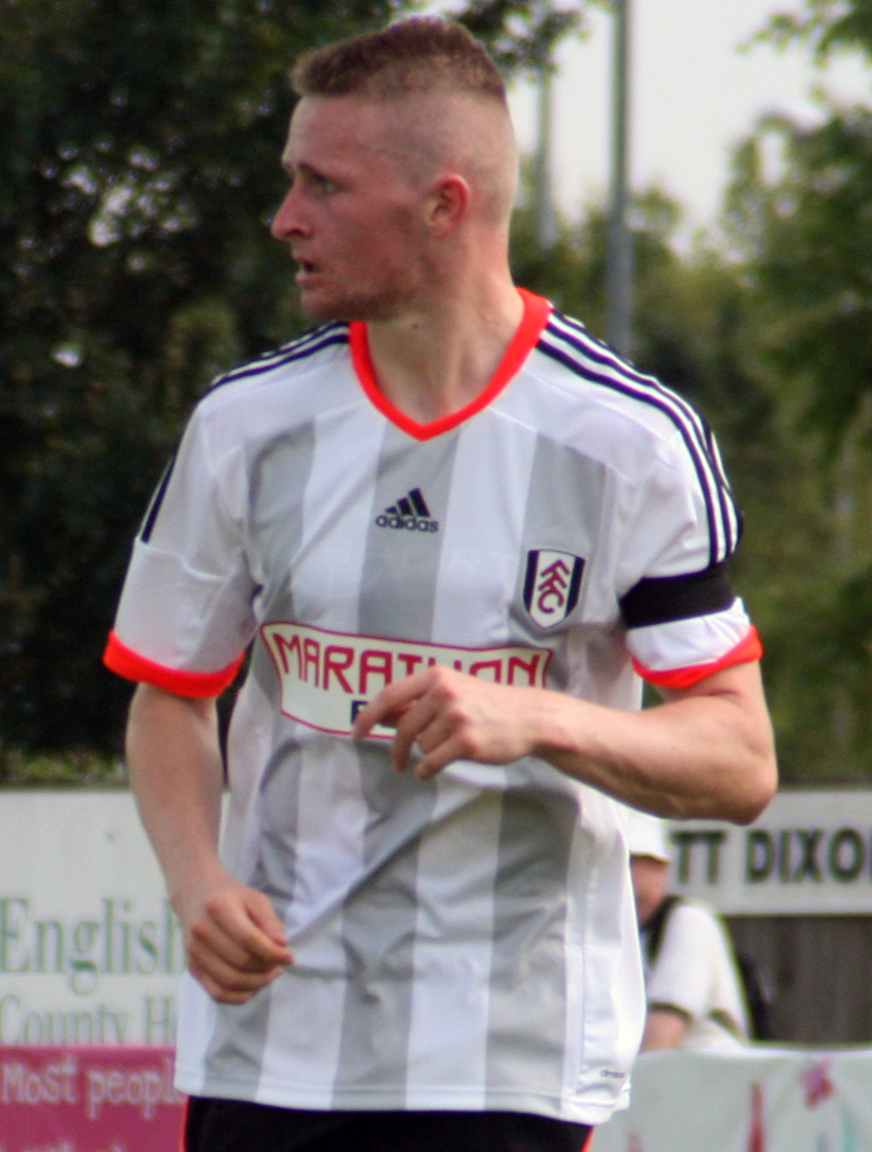
- Richards playing for Fulham U21s in 2014

Personal information
- Full name: Tom Oliver Richards
- Date of birth: 16 October 1994 (age 32)
- Place of birth: Guildford, England
- Position: Left midfielder

Team information
- Current team: Horsham

Youth career
- 2011–2014: Fulham

Senior career*
Years	Team	Apps	(Gls)
2014–2015	Fulham	0	(0)
2014	→ AFC Wimbledon (loan)	10	(0)
2015	→ Aldershot Town (loan)	9	(0)
2015–2016	Aldershot Town	25	(1)
2016	FC Kitzbühel	14	(1)
2017	Walton Casuals	4	(0)
2017	Welling United	6	(0)
2017–2018	Leatherhead	46	(5)
2018–2020	Dorking Wanderers	64	(14)
2020–2021	Kingstonian	9	(0)
2021–2024	Horsham	103	(8)
- * Club domestic league appearances and goals as of 18:00, 26 April 2024 (UTC)

Tom Oliver Richards (born 16 October 1994) is an English semi-professional footballer who is currently a free agent.

Richards spent his youth career at Fulham and made his senior debut on loan at AFC Wimbledon in 2014. He also spent time on loan at Aldershot Town before a permanent move in 2015. Richards spent five months in Austria with fourth division side FC Kitzbühel before joining Walton Casuals in 2017. He joined Welling United in February 2017.

== Club career ==
=== Fulham ===
Richards joined Fulham after a successful six-week trial in 2011, having been spotted playing Sunday league football. Adapting from a midfield role to full-back in his first season with the club, he lifted the Under-18s national title in 2012 before retaining the title alongside the Dallas Cup in 2013.

On 10 July 2013, Richards signed a one-year deal with an option to extend for a further season. He joined the Under-21 squad ahead of the 2013–14 season, and after sixteen appearances for the youth side was rewarded with a loan spell in the Football League.

On 28 February 2014, Richards joined AFC Wimbledon on loan for the remainder of the season. He made his professional debut in a 0–0 draw at Fleetwood Town on 1 March. Richards made ten appearances for the League Two club before his return to Craven Cottage in May.

On 21 February 2015, he joined Conference Premier club Aldershot Town on loan for the remainder of the season. Richards made his debut in a 3–1 victory over Dover Athletic on 3 March. He made nine appearances for the club during his loan spell.

=== Aldershot Town ===
On 6 June 2015, Richards joined Aldershot Town on a permanent basis following his impressive loan spell. Signing a one-year deal at the club, he scored his first goal for the club in a 1–0 victory against Guiseley.

With 27 appearances to his name during the 2015–16 campaign, Richards was released after the expiry of his contract and the arrival of new manager Gary Waddock.

=== FC Kitzbühel ===
In July 2016, Richards joined FC Kitzbühel, an Austrian fourth-tier club. He scored two goals in 17 appearances prior to the winter break. In December 2016, he agreed to a contract termination allowing him to return to England.

=== Later career ===
On 26 January 2017, Richards joined Isthmian Division One South side Walton Casuals. On 28 January, he made his debut in a 3–2 victory against Sittingbourne. He went on to make four appearances for the club before his departure. Richards played his final game in a 3–7 defeat to East Grinstead Town on 11 February.

On 17 February, Richards signed for National League South club Welling United. He made his debut the following day in a 2–2 draw at Weston Super Mare. On 30 July 2017, Richards joined Isthmian League Premier Division side Leatherhead after not being able to agree a deal with Welling. He transferred to Dorking Wanderers in summer 2018 and later Kingstonian in July 2020. He signed for Horsham in summer 2021.

== Personal life ==
Richards is a Chelsea supporter, but would often watch Fulham as a child due to his father and youth coach. As a child, Richards was nicknamed 'Duffer' due to a similarity in appearance to Damien Duff.

== Career statistics ==
As of end of 2024–25 season

Appearances and goals by club, season and competition
Club	Season	League			FA Cup		Other		Total	
Club	Season	Division	Apps	Goals	Apps	Goals	Apps	Goals	Apps	Goals
Fulham	2013–14	Premier League	0	0	0	0	0	0	0	0
Fulham	2014–15	Championship	0	0	0	0	0	0	0	0
Fulham	Total		0	0	0	0	0	0	0	0
AFC Wimbledon (loan)	2013–14	League Two	10	0	0	0	0	0	10	0
Aldershot Town (loan)	2014–15	Conference Premier	9	0	0	0	0	0	9	0
Aldershot Town	2015–16	National League	25	1	2	0	0	0	27	1
FC Kitzbühel	2016–17	Tiroler Liga	14	1	0	0	3	1	17	2
Walton Casuals	2016–17	Isthmian League Division One South	4	0	0	0	0	0	4	0
Welling United	2016–17	National League South	6	0	0	0	1 (Note: Appearances in Kent Senior Cup)	0	7	0
Leatherhead	2017–18	Isthmian League Premier Division	46	5	7	0	1 (Note: Appearances in FA Trophy)	0	54	5
Dorking Wanderers	2018–19	Isthmian League Premier Division	35	9	4	1	3 (Note: Two appearances in FA Trophy; one appearance in Surrey Senior Cup)	0	42	10
Dorking Wanderers	2019–20	National League South	29	5	1	0	7 (Note: Three appearances one goal in FA Trophy; two appearances two goals in Surrey Senior Cup; two appearances in National League South play-offs)	3	37	8
Dorking Wanderers	Total		64	14	5	1	10	3	79	18
Kingstonian	2020–21	Isthmian League Premier Division	9	0	2	0	1	0	12	0
Horsham	2021–22	Isthmian League Premier Division	38	2	7	0	7 (Note: One appearance in FA Trophy; one appearance in Sussex Senior Cup; five appearances in Alan Turvey Trophy)	0	52	2
Horsham	2022–23	Isthmian League Premier Division	33	5	1	0	4 (Note: Two appearances in FA Trophy; one appearance in Sussex Senior Cup; one appearance in Alan Turvey Trophy)	0	38	5
Horsham	2023–24	Isthmian League Premier Division	32	1	5	1	5	0	42	2
Horsham	Total		103	8	13	1	16	0	132	9
Raynes Park Vale	2024–25	Isthmian League South Central Division	25	1	0	0	2	0	27	1
Career total			315	30	29	2	34	4	378	36

== Honours ==
Dorking Wanderers

- Isthmian League Premier Division: 2018–19

Horsham

- Alan Turvey Trophy: 2021–22
