= James Balagizi =

English footballer (born 2003)

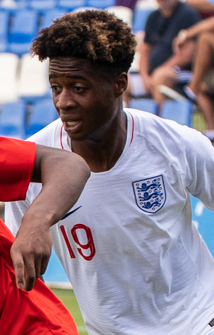
- Balagizi playing for England U17 in 2019

Personal information
- Full name: James O'Gee Balagizi
- Date of birth: 20 September 2003 (age 23)
- Place of birth: Manchester, England
- Height: 1.89 m (6 ft 2 in)
- Position: Attacking midfielder

Youth career
- Liverpool
- Manchester City
- Liverpool

Senior career*
Years	Team	Apps	(Gls)
2021–2026	Liverpool	0	(0)
2022–2023	→ Crawley Town (loan)	14	(2)
2023–2024	→ Wigan Athletic (loan)	3	(0)
2024	→ Kilmarnock (loan)	5	(0)
2025–2026	→ Forest Green Rovers (loan)	7	(1)

International career^{‡}
2019	England U16	5	(0)
2019	England U17	2	(0)
2021	England U18	1	(0)
2021–	England U19	8	(0)
2022–	England U20	3	(0)
- * Club domestic league appearances and goals as of 27 November 2025 (UTC) ‡ National team caps and goals as of 10:50, 1 October 2024 (UTC)

James O'Gee Balagizi (born 20 September 2003) is an English footballer who plays as an attacking midfielder.

== Early life ==
Born in Manchester, Balagizi started his career with Liverpool, before joining Manchester City at the age of six. After Manchester City decided against enrolling him at St Bede's College, Balagizi and his family decided to return to Liverpool, and he rejoined at under-11 level for a compensation fee of £9,000.

== Club career ==
Balagizi progressed well through the youth ranks at Liverpool, and is seen as one of their brightest prospects, despite a string of injuries limiting his youth team development. He signed his first professional contract in September 2020.

He was named on the bench for the senior squad for the first time in a 3–0 EFL Cup win over Norwich City in September 2021.

On 30 June 2022, Balagizi signed for Crawley Town on a season long loan. He would score twice in a 3–2 loss at home to Northampton Town. He would score his third Crawley goal in the Carabao Cup in a 2–0 win over Fulham. He was recalled to Liverpool on 20 January 2023 after sustaining an injury, having made sixteen appearances and scored three goals for Crawley.

On 19 July 2023, he joined EFL League One club Wigan Athletic on loan for the 2023–24 season. On 4 January 2024, Liverpool recalled Balagizi from his loan. He subsequently joined Kilmarnock on loan until the end of the season.

In August 2025 he joined Forest Green Rovers on a season long loan. On 7 January 2026, Liverpool recalled Balagizi from his loan. He was released by Liverpool at the end of the 2025–26 season.

== International career ==
Balagizi was born in England and is of Zimbabwean and DR Congolese descent. He has represented England at numerous youth levels.

On 21 September 2022, Balagizi made his England U20 debut as a substitute during a 3-0 victory over Chile at the Pinatar Arena.

== Career statistics ==
As of 14 November 2023

Appearances and goals by club, season and competition
Club	Season	League			FA Cup		EFL Cup		Europe		Other		Total	
Club	Season	Division	Apps	Goals	Apps	Goals	Apps	Goals	Apps	Goals	Apps	Goals	Apps	Goals
Liverpool U21	2020–21	—			—		—		—		1 (Note: Appearances in the EFL Trophy)	0	1	0
Liverpool	2021–22	Premier League	0	0	0	0	0	0	0	0	0	0	0	0
Crawley Town (loan)	2022–23	League Two	14	2	0	0	2	1	0	0	0	0	16	3
Wigan Athletic (loan)	2023–24	League One	3	0	0	0	1	0	0	0	3	0	7	0
Career total			17	2	0	0	3	1	0	0	4	0	24	3
