= Jack Powell (footballer, born 1994) =

English footballer

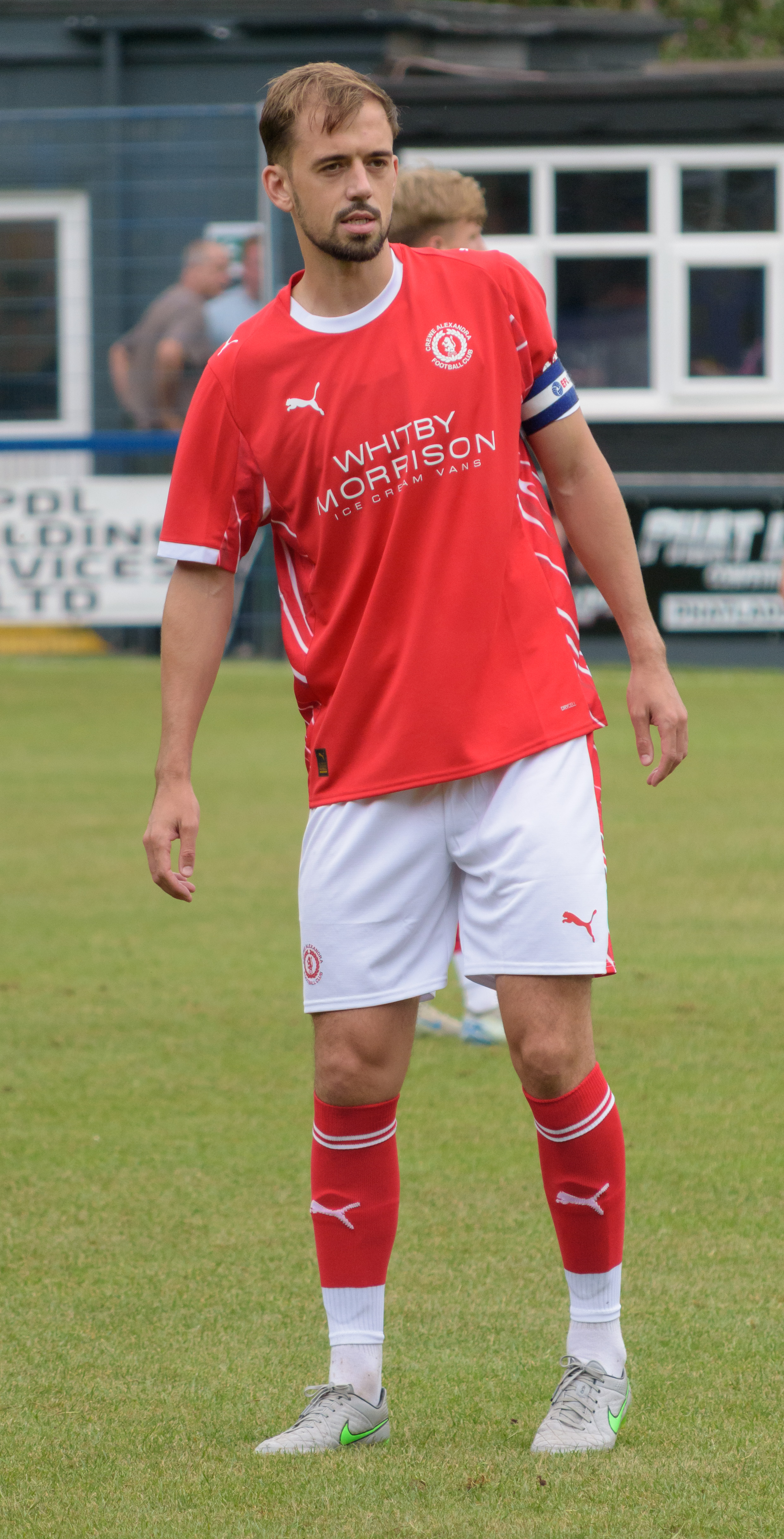
- Powell playing for Crewe Alexandra in 2025

Personal information
- Full name: Jack Patrick Powell
- Date of birth: 29 January 1994 (age 32)
- Place of birth: Canning Town, England
- Height: 1.85 m (6 ft 1 in)
- Position: Midfielder

Team information
- Current team: Hornchurch
- Number: 4

Youth career
- –2013: West Ham United

Senior career*
| Years | Team | Apps | (Gls) |
| 2013–2016 | Millwall | 6 | (0) |
| 2013–2014 | → Concord Rangers (loan) | 7 | (1) |
| 2015–2016 | → Braintree Town (loan) | 3 | (0) |
| 2016 | → Braintree Town (loan) | 4 | (0) |
| 2016–2018 | Ebbsfleet United | 96 | (21) |
| 2018–2019 | Maidstone United | 29 | (3) |
| 2019–2023 | Crawley Town | 132 | (8) |
| 2019–2020 | → Aldershot Town (loan) | 20 | (3) |
| 2023–2026 | Crewe Alexandra | 67 | (1) |
| 2026– | Hornchurch | 15 | (0) |

International career^{‡}
| 2017 | England C | 3 | (0) |
- * Club domestic league appearances and goals as of 18:39, 21 November 2026 (UTC) ‡ National team caps and goals as of 8 November 2017 (UTC)

Jack Patrick Powell (born 29 January 1994) is an English professional footballer who plays as a midfielder for National League club Hornchurch.

== Career ==
Jack Powell was a youth team player with West Ham United before being released by the club on 30 June 2013.

On 25 November 2013, Powell joined Concord Rangers on a youth loan until 19 December 2013. He made 7 league appearances for Concord and scored one goal.

=== Millwall ===
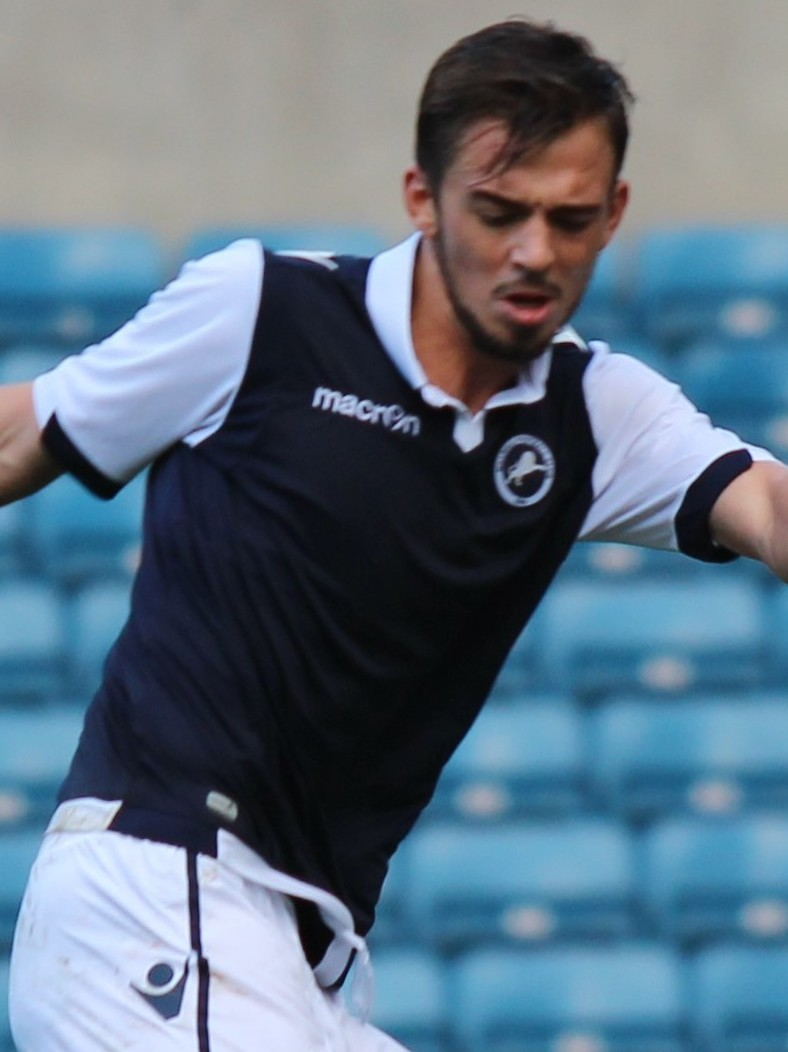
Powell in November 2015.

Powell made his senior debut for Millwall on 12 August 2014 in the League Cup against Wycombe Wanderers. He made his first start against Southampton, again in the League Cup on 26 August 2014. On 30 August 2014, Powell made his league debut against Blackpool in a 2–1 victory.

Powell joined Braintree Town on a one-month loan deal on 27 November 2015. He made his debut for Braintree Town on 28 November in a 0–0 draw with Torquay United. He returned to Millwall following the month-long loan having made just three appearances for Braintree Town. On 18 March 2016, he returned to Braintree Town on a loan deal until the end of the season. He appeared in four matches for Braintree across his loan spell at the club. Powell was released by Millwall at the end of the 2015–16 season.

=== National League ===
On 20 July 2016, Powell joined Ebbsfleet United after impressing in a trial match, helping the club secure promotion to the National League in 2017.

On 12 October 2018, Powell agreed to join Kent National League rivals, Maidstone United on a deal until the end of the season.

=== Crawley Town ===
On 5 July 2019, Powell joined EFL League Two club Crawley Town, signing a two-year contract with the club. He made his debut for the club in a 1–0 away defeat to Portsmouth in the EFL Trophy. On 12 September 2019, Powell joined Aldershot Town on loan until January 2020. He made his league debut for Crawley on 28 January 2020 in a draw at Plymouth Argyle, and scored his first Crawley goal in a 2–1 defeat at Grimsby Town on 23 February 2021.

=== Crewe Alexandra ===
On 30 June 2023, Powell signed for Crewe Alexandra on a two-year deal with the option for a further year. He made his Crewe debut in the club's season-opening fixture, a 2–2 draw at Gresty Road against Mansfield Town on 5 August, and scored his first goal for Crewe two weeks later on 19 August 2023, securing a 2–2 draw with a 94th-minute equaliser against Walsall at Gresty Road.

In October 2023, Powell suffered a ruptured anterior cruciate ligament, ruling him out for the rest of the season. After a prolonged recovery, Powell returned to the first team in late November 2024, making substitute appearances in the club's 1–1 league draws against Port Vale and then against Bradford City on 7 December 2024. He then played all 90 minutes of Crewe's EFL Trophy defeat at Wrexham on 10 December 2024. In January 2025, Powell agreed a new 18-month contract with Crewe.

On 13 May 2026, Crewe said he would be released in the summer when his contract expired.

=== Hornchurch ===
On 3 July 2026, Powell joined National League side Hornchurch.

== Style of play ==
Powell has been described as "gutsy" and "skillful" with comparisons made with former Millwall player, Terry Hurlock. He has also been nicknamed the Peckham Pirlo.

== Personal life ==
Powell is the older brother of Joe Powell.

Powell became a father aged 18 with his first child Shay, and his second child Jaxon was born in January 2018.

== Career statistics ==
As of match played 21 November 2026

Appearances and goals by club, season and competition
| Club | Season | League | | | FA Cup | | League Cup | | Other | | Total | |
| Club | Season | Division | Apps | Goals | Apps | Goals | Apps | Goals | Apps | Goals | Apps | Goals |
|---|---|---|---|---|---|---|---|---|---|---|---|---|
| Millwall | 2013–14 | Championship | 0 | 0 | 0 | 0 | 0 | 0 | — | | 0 | 0 |
| Millwall | 2014–15 | Championship | 5 | 0 | 0 | 0 | 2 | 0 | — | | 7 | 0 |
| Millwall | 2015–16 | League One | 1 | 0 | 1 | 0 | 0 | 0 | 1 (Note: Appearance(s) in Football League Trophy) | 0 | 3 | 0 |
| Millwall | Total | | 6 | 0 | 1 | 0 | 2 | 0 | 1 | 0 | 10 | 0 |
| Concord Rangers (loan) | 2013–14 | Conference South | 7 | 1 | 0 | 0 | — | | 1 (Note: Appearance(s) in FA Trophy) | 0 | 8 | 1 |
| Braintree Town (loan) | 2015–16 | National League | 7 | 0 | 0 | 0 | — | | 1 | 0 | 8 | 0 |
| Ebbsfleet United | 2016–17 | National League South | 38 | 10 | 3 | 2 | — | | 7 (Note: Four appearances and one goal in FA Trophy, three appearances in National League South play-offs) | 1 | 48 | 13 |
| Ebbsfleet United | 2017–18 | National League | 41 | 10 | 3 | 0 | — | | 5 (Note: Three appearances in FA Trophy, two in National League play-offs) | 0 | 49 | 10 |
| Ebbsfleet United | 2018–19 | National League | 12 | 1 | 0 | 0 | — | | 0 | 0 | 12 | 1 |
| Ebbsfleet United | Total | | 91 | 21 | 6 | 2 | — | | 12 | 1 | 109 | 24 |
| Maidstone United | 2018–19 | National League | 29 | 3 | 2 | 1 | — | | 0 | 0 | 31 | 4 |
| Crawley Town | League Two | 2019–20 | 6 | 0 | 0 | 0 | 0 | 0 | 1 | 0 | 7 | 0 |
| Crawley Town | 2020–21 | League Two | 44 | 3 | 4 | 0 | 1 | 0 | 1 | 0 | 50 | 3 |
| Crawley Town | 2021–22 | League Two | 37 | 1 | 1 | 0 | 1 | 0 | 3 | 0 | 42 | 1 |
| Crawley Town | 2022–23 | League Two | 45 | 4 | 1 | 0 | 3 | 0 | 2 | 1 | 51 | 5 |
| Crawley Town | Total | | 132 | 8 | 6 | 0 | 5 | 0 | 7 | 1 | 150 | 9 |
| Aldershot Town (loan) | 2019–20 | National League | 20 | 3 | 1 | 0 | — | | 1 | 0 | 22 | 3 |
| Crewe Alexandra | 2023–24 | League Two | 15 | 1 | 0 | 0 | 2 | 0 | 0 | 0 | 17 | 1 |
| Crewe Alexandra | 2024–25 | League Two | 22 | 0 | 0 | 0 | 0 | 0 | 1 | 0 | 23 | 0 |
| Crewe Alexandra | 2025–26 | League Two | 30 | 0 | 0 | 0 | 1 | 0 | 1 | 0 | 32 | 0 |
| Crewe Alexandra | Total | | 67 | 1 | 0 | 0 | 3 | 0 | 2 | 0 | 72 | 1 |
| Hornchurch | 2026–27 | National League | 15 | 0 | 0 | 0 | — | | 0 | 0 | 15 | 0 |
| Career total | | | 374 | 37 | 16 | 3 | 8 | 0 | 25 | 2 | 423 | 42 |
