= Tobi Omole =

English footballer (born 1999)

Personal information
- Full name: Adeleke Oluwatobiloba Adeyinka Omole
- Date of birth: 17 December 1999 (age 26)
- Place of birth: Brockley, England
- Height: 6 ft 2 in (1.89 m)
- Position: Defender

Team information
- Current team: AFC Whyteleafe

Youth career
- –2014: Thamesmead Town
- 2014–2020: Arsenal
- 2020–2022: Tottenham Hotspur

Senior career*
| Years | Team | Apps | (Gls) |
| 2022–2024 | Crawley Town | 5 | (0) |
| 2025 | Wealdstone | 3 | (0) |
| 2025–2026 | Tonbridge Angels | 19 | (0) |
| 2026 | Walton & Hersham | 6 | (0) |
| 2026– | AFC Whyteleafe | 1 | (0) |
- * Club domestic league appearances and goals as of 09:34, 16 October 2026 (UTC)

Adeleke Oluwatobiloba Adeyinka Omole (born 17 December 1999) is an English professional footballer who plays as a defender for Isthmian League Premier Division club AFC Whyteleafe. He has previously played in the Premier League 2 with Arsenal and Tottenham Hotspur's under-23 sides.

== Career ==
Omole was scouted for Arsenal's academy as a box-to-box midfielder from Thamesmead Town in 2014. He signed a two-year scholarship with the club in summer 2016, before signing a two-year professional contract in summer 2018. During his time with Arsenal's under-18 and under-23 sides he played as a left-back, centre-back and defensive midfielder. He was released by Arsenal in summer 2020.

In September 2020, following his release by Arsenal, he joined Tottenham Hotspur on trial. He signed a one-year deal with the club the following month. His contract was extended by a year at the end of the season. He was promoted to first-team training in February 2022, but was released by Tottenham after rejecting a contract offer by the club.

On 9 July 2022, Omole joined EFL League Two club Crawley Town on a two-year contract. Upon signing for the club, Omole suggested that "getting promoted is the most important thing for the team". He made his debut for the club in their 1–0 opening day defeat to Carlisle United on 30 July 2022, which Omole described as a "frustrating game". On 24 May 2024, the club announced the player would leave in the summer once his contract expired.

On 22 March 2025, Omole joined National League side Wealdstone.

In October 2025, Omole joined National League South club Tonbridge Angels.

On 5 August 2026, Omole made the switch to newly-promoted National League South side, Walton & Hersham following his departure from Tonbridge Angels. On 12 October 2026, it was announced that Omole had mutually agreed to leave the club following six appearances in all competitions.

Following his departure from Walton & Hersham, Omole joined Isthmian League Premier Division side, AFC Whyteleafe and debuted in their 5–0 home victory over Whitehawk on 14 October 2026.

== Personal life ==
Born in London, Omole is of Nigerian descent.

== Style of play ==
Omole is left-footed and is capable of playing as a left-back, centre-back and defensive midfielder. He describes himself as a "ball-playing centre-back".
