= George Francomb =

English footballer (born 1991)

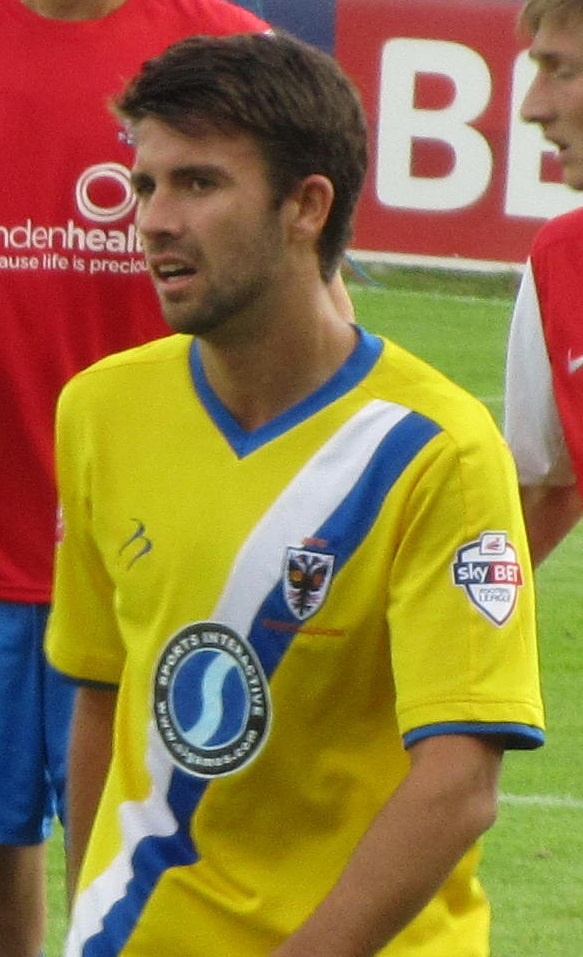
- Francomb playing for AFC Wimbledon in 2013

Personal information
- Full name: Georgie Francomb
- Date of birth: 8 September 1991 (age 35)
- Place of birth: Hackney, London, England
- Height: 5 ft 11 in (1.80 m)
- Position: Midfielder

Team information
- Current team: Dorking Wanderers
- Number: 37

Youth career
- 2001–2006: Tottenham Hotspur
- 2008–2009: Norwich City

Senior career*
Years	Team	Apps	(Gls)
2009–2013	Norwich City	2	(0)
2010–2011	→ Barnet (loan)	13	(0)
2012	→ Hibernian (loan)	14	(0)
2012	→ AFC Wimbledon (loan)	15	(0)
2013–2018	AFC Wimbledon	181	(11)
2018–2023	Crawley Town	138	(8)
2023–	Dorking Wanderers	104	(3)
- * Club domestic league appearances and goals as of 12:44, 31 October 2026 (UTC)

Georgie Francomb (born 8 September 1991) is an English professional footballer who plays for Dorking Wanderers. He can also play at right-back.

== Career ==
=== Early years ===
Francomb joined the academy of Premier League side Tottenham Hotspur at the age of 9 and remained with the club until he was released at the age of 14. At the age of 16, he joined the academy of Championship side Norwich City. On 6 October 2009, the 18-year–old made his first team debut for the Canaries in a 1–0 victory over Gillingham in the Second Round of the 2009–10 Football League Trophy. Francomb made his Football League debut on 10 October 2009 in a 1–0 away win over Carlisle United. He then went on to make a third start for the club in his home debut against Swindon Town on 24 October 2009. George was offered his first professional contract with "The Canaries" at the end of March 2010 and signed it on 1 July 2010. On 7 October 2010, Francomb joined Barnet on loan.

In January 2012, Francomb was loaned to Scottish Premier League club Hibernian. He made his debut for Hibs on 14 January, in a 3–2 win against Dunfermline. Francomb set up the opening goal in a 2–0 victory for Hibs against Ayr United in the Scottish Cup. He became recognised for his impressive range of passing and crossing abilities, and his dangerous set-pieces. Francomb left Hibs after their 2012 Scottish Cup Final defeat, in which he appeared as a substitute. Soon after returning to Norwich, Francomb agreed a new contract with the club. After a stint on loan at AFC Wimbledon from late August to late November, Francomb was released following the 2012–13 season.

=== AFC Wimbledon ===
Francomb joined AFC Wimbledon on a one-month loan deal on transfer deadline day August 2012; the deal was extended for another month on 5 October after he made 7 appearances in a month. Although a right back primarily, Francomb proved his capabilities as a winger. On 24 November 2012, it was announced that he would return to his parent club, having made 16 appearances in all competitions for "The Dons". Following his release from Norwich at the end of the 2012–13 season, Francomb rejoined AFC Wimbledon on 26 June 2013. Francomb scored his first career goal in a Football League Trophy first-round game that saw Brentford beat AFC Wimbledon 5–3 at Griffin Park on 3 September 2013.

He was released by AFC Wimbledon at the end of the 2017–18 season.

=== Crawley Town ===
On 5 June 2018, following his release from Wimbledon, Francomb agreed to join League Two side Crawley Town on a two-year deal. He became club captain at Crawley Town for the 2020–21 season. He scored his first goal for Crawley on 26 September 2020; a goal from 25 yards in a 3–2 away victory against Oldham Athletic. He scored 6 goals in 35 appearances across the 2020–21 season.

=== Dorking Wanderers ===
On 3 February 2023, following his release from Crawley Town, Francomb joined National League side Dorking Wanderers.

== Career statistics ==
As of match played 24 October 2026

Appearances and goals by club, season and competition
Club	Season	League			National Cup		League Cup		Other		Total	
Club	Season	Division	Apps	Goals	Apps	Goals	Apps	Goals	Apps	Goals	Apps	Goals
Norwich City	2009–10	League One	2	0	0	0	0	0	1 (Note: Appearances in the Football League Trophy)	0	3	0
Norwich City	2010–11	Championship	0	0	—		1	0	—		1	0
Norwich City	2011–12	Premier League	0	0	0	0	0	0	—		0	0
Norwich City	2012–13	Premier League	0	0	0	0	1	0	—		1	0
Norwich City	Total		2	0	0	0	2	0	1	0	5	0
Barnet (loan)	2010–11	League Two	13	0	2	0	—		—		15	0
Hibernian (loan)	2011–12	Scottish Premier League	14	0	3	0	—		—		17	0
AFC Wimbledon (loan)	2012–13	League Two	15	0	0	0	—		1	0	16	0
AFC Wimbledon	2013–14	League Two	33	3	1	0	1	0	1	1	36	4
AFC Wimbledon	2014–15	League Two	37	3	4	0	1	0	2	1	44	4
AFC Wimbledon	2015–16	League Two	40	3	0	0	1	0	1	0	42	3
AFC Wimbledon	2016–17	League One	34	2	3	0	0	0	4 (Note: Appearances in the EFL Trophy)	0	41	2
AFC Wimbledon	2017–18	League One	37	0	2	0	1	0	2	0	42	0
AFC Wimbledon	Total		181	11	10	0	4	0	10	2	205	13
Crawley Town	2018–19	League Two	41	0	2	0	1	0	2	0	46	0
Crawley Town	2019–20	League Two	15	0	1	0	2	0	2	0	20	0
Crawley Town	2020–21	League Two	33	6	1	0	0	0	1	0	35	6
Crawley Town	2021–22	League Two	38	2	0	0	1	0	1	0	40	2
Crawley Town	2022–23	League Two	11	0	1	0	1	0	1	0	14	0
Crawley Town	Total		138	8	5	0	5	0	7	0	155	8
Dorking Wanderers	2022–23	National League	12	1	—		—		—		12	1
Dorking Wanderers	2023–24	National League	31	0	1	0	—		2 (Note: Appearances in the FA Trophy)	0	34	0
Dorking Wanderers	2024–25	National League South	29	1	1	0	—		1	0	31	1
Dorking Wanderers	2025–26	National League South	24	0	1	0	—		3 (Note: One appearance in the FA Trophy, two in the National League South play-offs)	0	28	0
Dorking Wanderers	2026–27	National League South	8	1	4	0	—		0	0	12	1
Dorking Wanderers	Total		104	3	7	0	—		6	0	117	3
Career total			467	22	27	0	11	0	26	2	531	24
