= 2019–20 Crawley Town F.C. season =

Crawley Town
2019–20 season
- Chairman: Ziya Eren
- Head Coach: Gabriele Cioffi (until 2 December); John Yems (from 5 December)
- Stadium: Broadfield Stadium
- League Two: 13th
- FA Cup: Second round
- EFL Cup: Fourth round
- EFL Trophy: Group stage
- Top goalscorer: League: Ollie Palmer (13); All: Ollie Palmer (14)
- Highest home attendance: League: 2,636 vs Colchester United, 12 October 2019; All: 5,612 vs Colchester United, EFL Cup, 29 October 2019
- Lowest home attendance: League: 1,944 vs Port Vale, 14 December 2019; All: 361 vs Norwich City U21, 1 October 2019
- Average home league attendance: 2,232
Home colours	Away colours	Third colours

The 2019–20 season was Crawley Town's 124th season in their history and their fifth consecutive season in League Two. The club finished 13th in League Two, whilst they also competed in the FA Cup, EFL Cup and EFL Trophy, where they were eliminated in the second round, Fourth round and Group stage respectively. The season covered the period from 1 July 2019 to 30 June 2020.

== Season summary ==
The 2019–20 season saw Crawley Town compete in League Two for the fifth consecutive season. Despite the club reaching the fourth round of the EFL Cup, their best performance in the competition, manager Gabriele Cioffi left the club by mutual consent on 2 December 2019, with the club having won just once in their previous 11 matches with the club 17th in League Two. Cioffi was replaced by former manager John Yems three days later on a deal until the end of the season. Following an upturn in the club's form, with Crawley losing just 2 of their following 11 matches, Yems' contract was extended until the end of the 2022–23 season in late January 2020. However, in March 2020, the League Two season was postponed due to the COVID-19 pandemic, with Crawley still having a further 9 games to play. The season was later cancelled, with Crawley finishing 13th after clubs agreed to base the final table on points per game.

== Players ==
As of 19 May 2020

Players' ages as of 7 March 2020

No.	Name	Nat	Position	Since	Date of birth (age)	Signed from	Note
Goalkeepers
1	Glenn Morris	(England)	GK	2016	20 December 1983 (aged 36)	(England) Gillingham	
24	Alfie Jones	(England)	GK	2019	2 October 2000 (aged 19)	(England) Milton Keynes Dons	
27	Tom McGill	(England)	GK	2020	25 March 2000 (aged 19)	(England) Brighton & Hove Albion (on loan)	
Defenders
2	Lewis Young	(England)	RB/RM/LM	2014	27 September 1989 (aged 30)	(England) Bury	
3	Josh Doherty	(Northern Ireland)	CB/RB/LB	2017	15 March 1996 (aged 23)	(Northern Ireland) Ards	
5	Joe McNerney	(England)	CB	2015	24 January 1990 (aged 30)	(England) Woking	
6	Tom Dallison	(England)	CB	2019	2 February 1996 (aged 24)	(Scotland) Falkirk	
18	David Sesay	(England)	RB/LB/RM	2018	18 September 1998 (aged 21)	(England) Watford	
19	Jordan Tunnicliffe	(England)	CB	2019	13 October 1993 (aged 26)	(England) AFC Fylde	
23	George Forrest	(England)	CB	2019		Free agent	
25	Josh Dacres-Cogley	(England)	RB	2019	12 March 1996 (aged 23)	(England) Birmingham City (on loan)	
37	Emmanuel Adebowale	(England)	CB	2020	19 September 1997 (aged 22)	(England) Eastbourne Borough	
Midfielders
7	Reece Grego-Cox	(Republic of Ireland)	CF/RW	2018	12 November 1996 (aged 23)	(England) Woking	
8	Jimmy Smith	(England)	CM/RM/RB	2014	7 January 1987 (aged 33)	(England) Stevenage	
12	Nathan Ferguson	(England)	CM	2019	12 October 1995 (aged 24)	(England) Dulwich Hamlet	
14	George Francomb	(England)	RM/RB/CM	2018	8 September 1991 (aged 28)	(England) AFC Wimbledon	
15	Ashley Nathaniel-George	(England)	RW	2018	14 May 1995 (aged 24)	(England) Hendon	
21	Dannie Bulman	(England)	CM/DM	2017	24 January 1979 (aged 41)	(England) AFC Wimbledon	
28	Panutche Camará	(Guinea-Bissau)	CAM/CF/RW	2017	28 February 1997 (aged 23)	(England) Dulwich Hamlet	
30	Bez Lubala	(Democratic Republic of the Congo)	CAM/CF	2019	8 January 1998 (aged 22)	(England) Birmingham City	
34	Jack Powell	(England)	CM/CAM/LM	2019	29 January 1994 (aged 26)	(England) Maidstone United	
	Khaleel Rafiq Salah-Edine	(England)	CM	2020		(England) Cheshunt	
Forwards
9	Ollie Palmer	(England)	CF	2018	21 January 1992 (aged 28)	(England) Lincoln City	
10	Ashley Nadesan	(England)	CF	2019	9 September 1995 (aged 24)	(England) Fleetwood Town	
11	Gyliano van Velzen	(Netherlands)	LW	2019	14 April 1994 (aged 25)	(Netherlands) Roda JC Kerkrade	
13	Ricky German	(England)	CF	2019	13 January 1999 (aged 21)	(England) Hendon	
16	Mason Bloomfield	(England)	CF	2019	6 November 1996 (aged 23)	(England) Norwich City (on loan)	
17	Tarryn Allarakhia	(England)	LW	2018	17 October 1997 (aged 22)	(England) Colchester United	
26	Brian Galach	(Poland)	CF	2018	16 May 2001 (aged 18)	(England) Aldershot Town	
29	Ibrahim Meite	(England)	CF	2019	26 August 1996 (aged 23)	(England) Cardiff City	
33	Paolo Okoye	(England)	CF	2019			
Left club during season
4	Josh Payne	(England)	DM	2016	25 November 1990 (aged 29)	(England) Eastleigh	(Note: Joined Ebbsfleet United on a season-long loan in August 2019.)
11	Dominic Poleon	(England)	CF/LW/RW	2018	7 September 1993 (aged 26)	(England) Bradford City	(Note: Joined Newport County in September 2019.)
22	Filipe Morais	(Portugal)	RW/LW/AM	2018	21 November 1985 (aged 34)	(England) Bolton Wanderers	(Note: Joined Oldham Athletic on a season-long loan in August 2019)
31	Denzeil Boadu	(England)	CF	2020	20 February 1997 (aged 23)	(Germany) Borussia Dortmund II	(Note: Left club by mutual consent in January 2020.)

== Transfers ==
=== Transfers in ===
Date	Position	Name	Previous club (Note: Brackets around club names denote the player's contract with that club had expired before he joined Crawley)	Fee	Ref.
1 July 2019	MF	Nathan Ferguson	Dulwich Hamlet	Undisclosed	
1 July 2019	MF	Beryly Lubala	Birmingham City	Undisclosed	
1 July 2019	FW	Ashley Nadesan	(Fleetwood Town)	Free transfer	
5 July 2019	MF	Jack Powell	(Maidstone United)	Free transfer	
11 July 2019	DF	Jordan Tunnicliffe	(AFC Fylde)	Free transfer	
26 July 2019	DF	George Forrest	Free agent	Free transfer	
8 August 2019	GK	Alfie Jones	(Milton Keynes Dons)	Free transfer	
2 September 2019	DF	Jamie Sendles-White	(Torquay United)	Free transfer	
3 September 2019	MF	Denzeil Boadu	( (Germany) Borussia Dortmund)	Free transfer	
5 September 2019	MF	Gyliano van Velzen	( (Netherlands) Roda JC)	Free transfer	
31 January 2020	DF	Emmanuel Adebowale	Eastbourne Borough	Undisclosed	
28 February 2020	MF	Rafiq Khaleel	Free agent	Free transfer	

=== Loans in ===
Date from	Position	Name	From	Date until	Ref.
1 July 2019	FW	Mason Bloomfield	Norwich City	30 June 2020	
12 July 2019	GK	Michael Luyambula	Birmingham City	20 January 2020	
8 August 2019	DF	Josh Dacres-Cogley	Birmingham City	30 June 2020	
24 January 2020	GK	Tom McGill	Brighton & Hove Albion	30 June 2020	

=== Transfers out ===
Date	Position	Name	Subsequent club (Note: Brackets around club names denote the player joined that club after his contract with Crawley expired)	Fee	Ref.
1 July 2019	GK	Yusuf Mersin	(Dover Athletic)	Released	
1 July 2019	DF	Bondz N'Gala	(Ebbsfleet United)	Released	
2 September 2019	FW	Dominic Poleon	(Newport County)	Contract cancelled	
20 January 2020	MF	Denzeil Boadu	Free agent	Mutual consent	

=== Loans out ===
Date from	Position	Name	To	Date until	Ref.
1 July 2019	FW	Ricky German	Hemel Hempstead Town	2 January 2020	
3 August 2019	FW	Ibrahim Meite	Woking	October 2019	
2 September 2019	MF	Filipe Morais	Oldham Athletic	30 June 2020	
6 September 2019	DF	George Forrest	Leiston	October 2019	
9 September 2019	MF	Jimmy Smith	Yeovil Town	1 January 2020	
12 September 2019	MF	Jack Powell	Aldershot Town	1 January 2020	
3 October 2019	MF	Josh Payne	Ebbsfleet United	30 June 2020	
November 2019	DF	George Forrest	Brightlingsea Regent	30 June 2020	
3 January 2020	FW	Brian Galach	Billericay Town	February 2020	
21 February 2020	MF	Gyliano van Velzen	Aldershot Town	March 2020	
4 March 2020	FW	Ibrahim Meite	(Bulgaria) Pirin Blagoevgrad	30 June 2020	

== Pre-season ==
The Reds have announced pre-season friendlies against Swansea City, Brighton & Hove Albion, Horsham and Portsmouth.

13 July 2019 Friendly	Crawley Town	2–3	Swansea City	Crawley
15:00 BST	McNerney 51'; Morais 74'	Report	Dyer 16'; Byers 22'; McBurnie 47'	Stadium: Broadfield Stadium

19 July 2019 Friendly	Crawley Town	0–1	Brighton & Hove Albion	Crawley
19:45 BST		Report	Richards 84' (pen.)	Stadium: Broadfield Stadium; Attendance: 3,905

20 July 2019 Friendly	Horsham	3–1	Crawley Town	Horsham
15:00 BST	Smith 34'; Lavery 53', 68'	Report	Grego-Cox 36'	Stadium: Camping World Community Stadium; Attendance: 1,080

27 July 2019 Friendly	Crawley Town	1–2	Portsmouth	Crawley
15:00 BST	Bloomfield 80'	Report	Evans 20'; Naylor 51'	Stadium: Broadfield Stadium; Attendance: 1,777

== Competitions ==
=== League Two ===
==== League table ====
Pos	Team	Pld	W	D	L	GF	GA	GD	Pts	PPG
9	Bradford City	37	14	12	11	44	40	+4	54	1.46
10	Forest Green Rovers	36	13	10	13	43	40	+3	49	1.36
11	Salford City	37	13	11	13	49	46	+3	50	1.35
12	Walsall	36	13	8	15	40	49	−9	47	1.31
13	Crawley Town	37	11	15	11	51	47	+4	48	1.30
14	Newport County	36	12	10	14	32	39	−7	46	1.28
15	Grimsby Town	37	12	11	14	45	51	−6	47	1.27
16	Cambridge United	37	12	9	16	40	48	−8	45	1.22
17	Leyton Orient	36	10	12	14	47	55	−8	42	1.17

Source: EFL Official Website
Rules for classification: 1) Points per game; 2) Goal difference; 3) Number of goals scored; 4) Head-to-head results; 5) Wins; 6) Away goals; 7) Penalty points (sec 9.5); 8) 12-point sending off offences

==== Results summary ====
Overall								Home						Away					
Pld	W	D	L	GF	GA	GD	Pts	W	D	L	GF	GA	GD	W	D	L	GF	GA	GD
37	11	15	11	51	47	+4	48	10	5	4	30	19	+11	1	10	7	21	28	−7

Last updated: 7 March 2020.

==== Results by matchday ====
Matchday	1	2	3	4	5	6	7	8	9	10	11	12	13	14	15	16	17	18	19	20	21	22	23	24	25	26	27	28	29	30	31	32	33	34	35	36	37
Ground	A	H	A	H	A	H	A	H	H	A	H	A	H	A	A	H	A	H	H	A	H	A	H	A	A	H	H	A	H	A	H	A	A	H	H	A	H
Result	L	W	D	L	W	W	D	W	D	D	L	L	W	L	D	L	L	D	L	D	D	L	W	D	D	D	W	L	W	D	W	D	L	D	W	D	W
Position	16	9	12	18	12	8	11	8	7	8	10	13	9	13	13	17	17	16	17	16	16	18	16	15	16	16	13	15	14	13	13	12	15	14	12	12	12

Updated to match(es) played on 7 March 2020. Source: Statto.com
A = Away; H = Home; W = Win; D = Draw; L = Loss

==== Matches ====
On Thursday, 20 June 2019, the EFL League Two fixtures were revealed.

On 13 March 2020, the EFL, alongside the FA announced the suspension of all domestic football until 3 April due to the rapidly developing COVID-19 pandemic. On 3 April 2020, this suspension was extended indefinitely.

On 15 May 2020, the clubs voted to end the season with immediate effect with the final table being determined on a points-per-game basis. No decision was made as to promotion and relegation. The play-offs would be played as normal. The decision meant Swindon Town would be crowned champions and would be joined by Crewe Alexandra and Plymouth Argyle in League One the following season.

3 August 2019 1	Carlisle United	2–1	Crawley Town	Carlisle
15:00 BST	McKirdy 6'; Scougall 32'; Webster (yellow card) 46'; Loft (yellow card) 90+4'	Report	Lubala 16'; Camará (yellow card) 38'; Sesay (yellow card) 43'; Young (red card) 90+7'	Stadium: Brunton Park; Attendance: 4,833; Referee: James Oldham

10 August 2019 2	Crawley Town	2–0	Salford City	Crawley
15:00 BST	Lubala 36' (pen.) (yellow card) 70'; Ferguson 55'; Dallison (yellow card) 45+3'	Report	Piergianni (yellow card) 41'; Jones (yellow card) 46'	Stadium: Broadfield Stadium; Attendance: 2,400; Referee: Graham Salisbury

17 August 2019 3	Scunthorpe United	2–2	Crawley Town	Scunthorpe
15:00 BST	Butler (yellow card) 15'; McArdle 33'; Lund 54' (yellow card) 72'	Report	Lubala 16' (penalty missed) 80'; Ferguson (yellow card) 39' (goal) 74'	Stadium: Glanford Park; Attendance: 3,186; Referee: Christopher Pollard

20 August 2019 4	Crawley Town	1–2	Crewe Alexandra	Crawley
19:45 BST	Lubala 16', (yellow card) 51'	Report	Wintle 30'; Green 55'	Stadium: Broadfield Stadium; Attendance: 2,006; Referee: Tom Nield

24 August 2019 5	Leyton Orient	2–3	Crawley Town	Leyton
15:00 BST	Wright 22' (yellow card) 90+4'; Maguire-Drew (yellow card) 24'; Angol 53' (pen.); Gorman (yellow card) 84'	Report	Ferguson 30'; Camará (yellow card) 45+1'; Sesay (yellow card) 52'; Palmer 69', 71'; Lubala (yellow card) 80'	Stadium: Brisbane Road; Attendance: 4,905; Referee: Brett Huxtable

31 August 2019 6	Crawley Town	1–0	Cheltenham Town	Crawley
15:00 BST	Doherty (yellow card) 82'; Palmer (yellow card) 90+1' (goal) 90+1'	Report	Clements (yellow card) 77'	Stadium: Broadfield Stadium; Attendance: 2,095; Referee: Ben Toner

7 September 2019 7	Macclesfield Town	1–1	Crawley Town	Macclesfield
15:00 BST	Vassell 21'; Stephens (yellow card) 22'; Kelleher (yellow card) 50'; Harris (yellow card) 80'; Archibald (yellow card) 90+3'	Report	Doherty (yellow card) 17'; Sesay (yellow card) 34'; Lubala 73'; Bulman (yellow card) 90+3'	Stadium: Moss Rose; Attendance: 1,788; Referee: Charles Breakspear

14 September 2019 8	Crawley Town	1–0	Mansfield Town	Crawley
15:00 BST	Doherty (yellow card) 16'; Lubala (penalty missed) 26' 53'; Sendles-White (yellow card) 74'	Report	Sweeney (yellow card) 48'	Stadium: Broadfield Stadium; Attendance: 2,068; Referee: Scott Oldham

17 September 2019 9	Crawley Town	2–2	Plymouth Argyle	Crawley
19:45 BST	Grego-Cox 9'; Doherty (yellow card) 77'; Palmer 85' (pen.)	Report	Edwards 73', 79'	Stadium: Broadfield Stadium; Attendance: 2,501; Referee: David Rock

21 September 2019 10	Northampton Town	2–2	Crawley Town	Northampton
15:00 BST	Lines 15' (pen.) (penalty missed) 50'; McWilliams 64'; Williams (yellow card) 71'	Report	Doherty (yellow card) 49'; Nathaniel-George 70'; Martin 90+5' (o.g.)	Stadium: Sixfields Stadium; Attendance: 5,121; Referee: Andy Haines

28 September 2019 11	Crawley Town	2–3	Walsall	Crawley
15:00 BST	Nathaniel-George 42' (pen.); Sesay (yellow card) 66'; Payne 90+3'	Report	Clarke 14'; Adebayo 27'; McDonald 44'; Holden (yellow card) 60'; Kinsella (yellow card) 90+4'	Stadium: Broadfield Stadium; Attendance: 2,275; Referee: Sam Purkiss

5 October 2019 12	Forest Green Rovers	3–1	Crawley Town	Nailsworth
15:00 BST	Mills (penalty missed) 24' 24', 55' (pen.); Collins 52'; Winchester (yellow card) 68'	Report	Bloomfield 58'; Sesay (yellow card) 72' van Velzen (yellow card) 89'; Lubala (yellow card) 90+2'	Stadium: The New Lawn; Attendance: 2,136; Referee: Peter Wright

12 October 2019 13	Crawley Town	2–1	Colchester United	Crawley
15:00 BST	Doherty (yellow card) 23'; Ferguson (yellow card) 43'; Grego-Cox 55'; Bloomfield 80'	Report	Prosser 35' (yellow card) 46'	Stadium: Broadfield Stadium; Attendance: 2,636; Referee: Martin Coy

19 October 2019 14	Bradford City	2–1	Crawley Town	Bradford
15:00 BST	Pritchard 18'; Cooke (yellow card) 45+3'; Oteh (yellow card) 45+5'; Devine 49'; Vaughan (yellow card) 69'	Report	Young (yellow card) 26'; Dallison (yellow card) 37'; Grego-Cox 81'	Stadium: Valley Parade; Attendance: 13,813; Referee: Will Finnie

22 October 2019 15	Newport County	1–1	Crawley Town	Newport
19:45 BST	Abrahams 74' (pen.)	Report	Nathaniel-George 35' (pen.); Sesay (yellow card) 59'; Grego-Cox (yellow card) 68'; Lubala (yellow card) 73'	Stadium: Rodney Parade; Attendance: 3,119; Referee: Darren Drysdale

26 October 2019 16	Crawley Town	0–4	Swindon Town	Crawley
15:00 BST	Tunnicliffe (yellow card) 47'; Dallison (yellow card) 58'; Grego-Cox (yellow card) 69'; Allarakhia (yellow card) 81'	Report	Doyle 5', 44', 61'; Grant (yellow card) 66'; Yates 87'	Stadium: Broadfield Stadium; Attendance: 2,601; Referee: Michael Salisbury

2 November 2019 17	Cambridge United	2–1	Crawley Town	Cambridge
15:00 GMT	Smith (yellow card) 70' (goal) 83'; O'Neil (yellow card) 75'; Lewis 86'	Report	Ferguson (yellow card) 12'; Lubala 80'; Dallison (yellow card) 90'	Stadium: Abbey Stadium; Attendance: 3,538; Referee: Nick Kinseley

16 November 2019 18	Crawley Town	1–1	Morecambe	Crawley
15:00 GMT	Lubala 44' (pen.)	Report	Stockton (yellow card) 42' (goal) 81'; Conlan (yellow card) 72'	Stadium: Broadfield Stadium; Attendance: 2,079; Referee: Antony Coggins

23 November 2019 19	Crawley Town	0–1	Exeter City	Crawley
15:00 GMT	Francomb (yellow card) 39'; Dallison (yellow card) 45'	Report	Law (yellow card) 65'; Moxey 77'	Stadium: Broadfield Stadium; Attendance: 2,170; Referee: Trevor Kettle

7 December 2019 20	Stevenage	0–0	Crawley Town	Stevenage
15:00 GMT		Report		Stadium: Broadhall Way; Referee: Brett Huxtable

14 December 2019 21	Crawley Town	0–0	Port Vale	Crawley
15:00 GMT	Doherty (yellow card) 68'	Report	Gibbons (yellow card) 75'	Stadium: Broadfield Stadium; Attendance: 1,944; Referee: Will Finnie

21 December 2019 22	Oldham Athletic	2–1	Crawley Town	Oldham
15:00 GMT	Wheater 49'; Maouche 58'	Report	Young 17'	Stadium: Boundary Park; Attendance: 2,737; Referee: Martin Coy

26 December 2019 23	Crawley Town	4–0	Northampton Town	Crawley
15:00 GMT	Ferguson 27'; Lubala 62'; Palmer 80'; Bloomfield 84'	Report	McCormack (yellow card) 44'; Wharton (yellow card) 75'	Stadium: Broadfield Stadium; Attendance: 2,190; Referee: Sam Purkiss

29 December 2019 24	Grimsby Town	1–1	Crawley Town	Cleethorpes
15:00 GMT	Hessenthaler 2'; Gibson (yellow card) 25'; Hendrie (yellow card) 59'; Clifton (yellow card) 62'	Report	Nadesan 37'; Lubala (yellow card) 43'; McNerney (yellow card) 90+3'	Stadium: Blundell Park; Attendance: 3,612; Referee: Oliver Yates

1 January 2020 25	Colchester United	1–1	Crawley Town	Colchester
15:00 GMT	Nouble 64'	Report	Dallison (yellow card) 20'; Prosser 72' (o.g.)	Stadium: Colchester Community Stadium; Attendance: 3,729; Referee: Antony Coggins

4 January 2020 26	Crawley Town	1–1	Forest Green Rovers	Crawley
15:00 GMT	Lubala 45'	Report	Tunnicliffe 63' (o.g.)	Stadium: Broadfield Stadium; Attendance: 2,082; Referee: David Rock

11 January 2020 27	Crawley Town	2–1	Bradford City	Crawley
15:00 GMT	Palmer 21', 40'; German (yellow card) 90'	Report	Vaughan 84'	Stadium: Broadfield Stadium; Attendance: 2,361; Referee: Neil Hair

18 January 2020 28	Walsall	2–1	Crawley Town	Bescot
15:00 GMT	Gordon 72'; McDonald 88'	Report	Camará 27' (yellow card) 82'; Dacres-Cogley (yellow card) 66'; Lubala (yellow card) 76'	Stadium: Bescot Stadium; Attendance: 4,011; Referee: Sebastian Stocksbridge

25 January 2020 29	Crawley Town	3–2	Grimsby Town	Crawley
15:00 GMT	Palmer 16', 70'; Nadesan (yellow card) 58' (goal) 77'; Doherty (yellow card) 85'	Report	Whitehouse 21'; Hanson 32'	Stadium: Broadfield Stadium; Attendance: 2,480; Referee: Nick Kinseley

28 January 2020 30	Plymouth Argyle	2–2	Crawley Town	Plymouth
20:15 GMT	Sarcevic 44' (pen.); Wootton (yellow card) 78'; Jephcott 83'	Report	Palmer 27', 90+2'; Lubala (yellow card) 43'; Doherty (yellow card) 69'	Stadium: Home Park; Attendance: 9,184; Referee: Alan Young

1 February 2020 31	Crawley Town	3–1	Scunthorpe United	Crawley
15:00 GMT	Tunnicliffe 6'; Grego-Cox 24'; Palmer (yellow card) 37' (goal) 45'; Doherty (yellow card) 47'; Sendles-White (yellow card) 87'	Report	Sutton (yellow card) 34' van Veen 57' (pen.)	Stadium: Broadfield Stadium; Attendance: 2,130; Referee: Tom Nield

8 February 2020 32	Salford City	0–0	Crawley Town	Salford
15:00 GMT	Hunter (yellow card) 61'	Report	Sesay (yellow card) 54'; Palmer (yellow card) 61'; Nadesan (yellow card) 61'	Stadium: Moor Lane; Attendance: 2,385; Referee: Leigh Doughty

11 February 2020 33	Crewe Alexandra	2–1	Crawley Town	Crewe
19:45 GMT	Porter 72' (pen.), 90'; Offord (yellow card) 83'; Ainley (yellow card) 90+1'	Report	Francomb (yellow card) 51'; Bulman (yellow card) 67'; Grego-Cox (yellow card) 68'; Ferguson 84' (pen.)	Stadium: Gresty Road; Attendance: 3,314; Referee: Antony Coggins

15 February 2020 34	Crawley Town	0–0	Carlisle United	Crawley
15:00 GMT	Tunnicliffe (yellow card) 62'	Report	Webster (yellow card) 35'; Anderton (yellow card) 66'; Hayden (yellow card) 85'	Stadium: Broadfield Stadium; Attendance: 2,114; Referee: David Rock

22 February 2020 35	Crawley Town	2–0	Stevenage	Crawley
15:00 GMT	Lubala 21'; Camará (yellow card) 81'; Nadesan 90+3'	Report	Wildin (yellow card) 65'; Carroll (yellow card) 89'	Stadium: Broadfield Stadium; Attendance: 2,232; Referee: Paul Marsden

29 February 2020 36	Exeter City	1–1	Crawley Town	Exeter
15:00 GMT	Moxey (yellow card) 42'; Dickenson 82'	Report	Nadesan 34'	Stadium: St James Park; Attendance: 5,404; Referee: Ben Toner

7 March 2020 37	Crawley Town	3–0	Oldham Athletic	Crawley
15:00 GMT	German 36'; Ferguson (yellow card) 49'; Nadesan 70'; Lubala 76' (pen.); Dacres-Cogley (yellow card) 85'	Report		Stadium: Broadfield Stadium; Attendance: 2,037; Referee: Charles Breakspear

14 March 2020	Port Vale	v	Crawley Town	Burslem, Stoke-on-Trent
15:00 GMT		Report		Stadium: Vale Park
Note: On 13 March 2020, the FA decided to postpone all professional matches until 3 April 2020.

17 March 2020	Crawley Town	v	Newport County	Crawley
19:45 GMT		Report		Stadium: Broadfield Stadium
Note: On 13 March 2020, the FA decided to postpone all professional matches until 3 April 2020.

21 March 2020	Swindon Town	v	Crawley Town	Swindon
15:00 GMT		Report		Stadium: County Ground
Note: On 13 March 2020, the FA decided to postpone all professional matches until 3 April 2020.

28 March 2020	Crawley Town	v	Cambridge United	Crawley
15:00 GMT		Report		Stadium: Broadfield Stadium
Note: On 13 March 2020, the FA decided to postpone all professional matches until 3 April 2020.

4 April 2020	Morecambe	v	Crawley Town	Morecambe
15:00 BST				Stadium: Globe Arena
Note: On 3 April, the English Football League decided to postpone all football until safe to do so due to the COVID-19 pandemic.

10 April 2020	Crawley Town	v	Leyton Orient	Crawley
15:00 BST				Stadium: Broadfield Stadium
Note: On 3 April, the English Football League decided to postpone all football until safe to do so due to the COVID-19 pandemic.

13 April 2020	Cheltenham Town	v	Crawley Town	Cheltenham
15:00 BST				Stadium: Whaddon Road
Note: On 3 April, the English Football League decided to postpone all football until safe to do so due to the COVID-19 pandemic.

18 April 2020	Crawley Town	v	Macclesfield Town	Crawley
15:00 BST				Stadium: Broadfield Stadium
Note: On 3 April, the English Football League decided to postpone all football until safe to do so due to the COVID-19 pandemic.

25 April 2020	Mansfield Town	v	Crawley Town	Mansfield
15:00 BST				Stadium: Field Mill
Note: On 3 April, the English Football League decided to postpone all football until safe to do so due to the COVID-19 pandemic.

=== FA Cup ===
The first round draw was made on 21 October 2019. The second round draw was made live on 11 November from Chichester City's stadium, Oaklands Park.

9 November 2019 First round	Crawley Town	4–1	Scunthorpe United	Crawley
15:00 GMT	Nadesan 35'; Grego-Cox 82', 90+6'; Nathaniel-George 90+4'	Report	Lund (yellow card) 30'; Colclough 79'; McArdle (yellow card) 87'	Stadium: Broadfield Stadium; Attendance: 1,706; Referee: Lee Swabey

1 December 2019 Second round	Crawley Town	1–2	Fleetwood Town	Crawley
14:00 GMT	Palmer 44'; Lubala (yellow card) 79'; Dallison (yellow card) 87'; Doherty (yellow card) 90+4'	Report	Morris 41'; Madden 66'	Stadium: Broadfield Stadium; Referee: Matthew Donohue

=== EFL Cup ===
The first round draw was made on 20 June. The second round draw was made on 13 August 2019 following the conclusion of all but one first-round matches. The third round draw was confirmed on 28 August 2019, live on Sky Sports. The draw for the fourth round was made on 25 September 2019.

13 August 2019 First round	Walsall	2–3	Crawley Town	Bescot
19:45 BST	Lavery 54' (pen.), 71'	Report	Morais 21'; Dallison 48', (yellow card) 76'; Nadesan 56'	Stadium: Bescot Stadium; Attendance: 2,451; Referee: Carl Boyeson

27 August 2019 Second round	Crawley Town	1–0	Norwich City	Crawley
19:45 BST	Lubala 17'; Camará (yellow card) 23'; Luyambula (yellow card) 61'; Bulman (yellow card) 85'; Grego-Cox (yellow card) 90'	Report	Vrančić (yellow card) 29'	Stadium: Broadfield Stadium; Attendance: 5,109; Referee: John Busby

24 September 2019 Third round	Crawley Town	1–1 (5–3 p)	Stoke City	Crawley
19:45 BST	Bulman (yellow card) 21'; Ferguson 38' (yellow card) 56'; Grego-Cox (yellow card) 78'	Report	Vokes 23'; Batth (yellow card) 51'; Collins (red card) 62'	Stadium: Broadfield Stadium; Attendance: 4,165; Referee: Kevin Johnson
	Penalties
	Lubala (penalty scored); Sesay (penalty scored); Dallison (penalty scored); Nathaniel-George (penalty scored); Palmer (penalty scored)		Vokes (penalty missed); Smith (penalty scored); Duffy (penalty scored); Etebo (penalty scored)

29 October 2019 Fourth round	Crawley Town	1–3	Colchester United	Crawley
19:45 GMT	Bulman 20'; Dallison (yellow card) 52'	Report	Norris 22'; Nouble (yellow card) 36'; Luyambula 53' (o.g.); Gambin 79'	Stadium: Broadfield Stadium; Attendance: 5,612; Referee: Tony Harrington

=== EFL Trophy ===
On 9 July 2019, the pre-determined group stage draw was announced with Invited clubs to be drawn on 12 July 2019.

Pos	Div	Team	Pld	W	PW	PL	L	GF	GA	GD	Pts	Qualification
1	L1	Portsmouth	3	2	1	0	0	6	3	+3	8	Advance to Round 2
2	L1	Oxford United	3	2	0	1	0	8	4	+4	7	Advance to Round 2
3	ACA	Norwich City U21	3	1	0	0	2	4	6	−2	3	
4	L2	Crawley Town	3	0	0	0	3	2	7	−5	0	

Source: EFL.com

3 September 2019 Group stage	Portsmouth	1–0	Crawley Town	Milton
19:45 BST	Pitman 70'	Report	Allarakhia (yellow card) 28'; Sendles-White (yellow card) 36'	Stadium: Fratton Park; Attendance: 3,784; Referee: James Linington

1 October 2019 Group stage	Crawley Town	1–2	Norwich City U21	Crawley
19:45 BST	Dallison (yellow card) 24'; Boadu (yellow card) 42'; Nathaniel-George 63'	Report	Ahadme 19'; Johnson (yellow card) 21'; Milovanovic (yellow card) 52'; Lomas 74'	Stadium: Broadfield Stadium; Attendance: 361; Referee: Alan Young

12 November 2019 Group stage	Crawley Town	1–4	Oxford United	Crawley
19:45 GMT	Bloomfield 50'; Francomb (red card) 56'	Report	Hall 12', 57' (pen.), 73' (pen.); Forde 28' (pen.)	Stadium: Broadfield Stadium; Attendance: 412; Referee: Joshua Smith

== Statistics ==
=== Appearances and goals ===
As of 26 May 2020

No.	Pos	Nat	Player	Total		League Two		FA Cup		EFL Cup		EFL Trophy	
No.	Pos	Nat	Player	Apps	Goals	Apps	Goals	Apps	Goals	Apps	Goals	Apps	Goals
1	GK	(England) ENG	Glenn Morris	39	0	37	0	2	0	0	0	0	0
2	DF	(England) ENG	Lewis Young	21	1	13+2	1	2	0	0+1	0	2+1	0
3	DF	(Northern Ireland) NIR	Josh Doherty	37	0	30+1	0	0+1	0	4	0	1	0
4	MF	(England) ENG	Josh Payne	5	1	1+1	1	0	0	1	0	2	0
5	DF	(England) ENG	Joe McNerney	7	0	6	0	0	0	0	0	1	0
6	DF	(England) ENG	Tom Dallison	30	1	20+1	0	2	0	4	1	3	0
7	FW	(Republic of Ireland) IRL	Reece Grego-Cox	34	6	24+4	4	2	2	3+1	0	0	0
8	MF	(England) ENG	Jimmy Smith	0	0	0	0	0	0	0	0	0	0
9	FW	(England) ENG	Ollie Palmer	33	14	22+6	13	1	1	3+1	0	0	0
10	FW	(England) ENG	Ashley Nadesan	31	7	22+3	5	2	1	1+1	1	2	0
11	FW	(Netherlands) NED	Gyliano van Velzen	5	0	0+4	0	0	0	0	0	1	0
12	MF	(England) ENG	Nathan Ferguson	39	6	29+2	5	1+1	0	3+1	1	0+2	0
13	FW	(England) ENG	Ricky German	8	1	1+7	1	0	0	0	0	0	0
14	MF	(England) ENG	George Francomb	20	0	10+5	0	1	0	1+1	0	2	0
15	MF	(England) ENG	Ashley Nathaniel-George	22	5	7+9	3	0+1	1	1+1	0	3	1
16	FW	(England) ENG	Mason Bloomfield	24	4	10+11	3	0	0	1	0	2	1
17	MF	(England) ENG	Tarryn Allarakhia	24	0	7+12	0	0	0	1+2	0	2	0
18	DF	(England) ENG	David Sesay	31	0	18+7	0	2	0	3	0	1	0
19	DF	(England) ENG	Jordan Tunnicliffe	45	1	37	1	2	0	4	0	0+2	0
20	DF	(Northern Ireland) NIR	Jamie Sendles-White	17	0	12+2	0	0	0	0	0	3	0
21	MF	(England) ENG	Dannie Bulman	34	1	28+1	0	2	0	3	1	0	0
22	MF	(Portugal) POR	Filipe Morais	7	1	2+3	0	0	0	1+1	1	0	0
23	DF	(England) ENG	George Forrest	0	0	0	0	0	0	0	0	0	0
24	GK	(England) ENG	Alfie Jones	0	0	0	0	0	0	0	0	0	0
25	DF	(England) ENG	Josh Dacres-Cogley	16	0	15+1	0	0	0	0	0	0	0
26	FW	(Poland) POL	Brian Galach	2	0	0	0	0	0	0	0	0+2	0
27	GK	(England) ENG	Tom McGill	0	0	0	0	0	0	0	0	0	0
28	MF	(Guinea-Bissau) GNB	Panutche Camará	34	1	23+6	1	1	0	3	0	1	0
29	FW	(England) ENG	Ibrahim Meite	0	0	0	0	0	0	0	0	0	0
30	FW	(Democratic Republic of the Congo) COD	Beryly Lubala	41	13	32+2	12	2	0	3	1	1+1	0
31	FW	(England) ENG	Denzeil Boadu	2	0	0	0	0	0	0	0	2	0
33	MF	(England) ENG	Paolo Okoye	0	0	0	0	0	0	0	0	0	0
34	MF	(England) ENG	Jack Powell	7	0	0+6	0	0	0	0	0	1	0
35	GK	(Democratic Republic of the Congo) COD	Michael Luyambula	7	0	0	0	0	0	4	0	3	0
37	DF	(England) ENG	Emmanuel Adebowale	1	0	1	0	0	0	0	0	0	0
