= Michael Luyambula =

German footballer

Personal information
- Full name: Michael Ngemba Luyambula (Note: Some sources list his given names as Ngemba Michael, but this article follows the player's usage of Michael Ngemba on his social media, an ordering also supported by the EFL website.)
- Date of birth: 8 June 1999 (age 27)
- Place of birth: Neumünster, Germany
- Height: 1.89 m (6 ft 2 in)
- Position: Goalkeeper

Team information
- Current team: Wuppertaler SV
- Number: 24

Youth career
- –2008: TSV Kronshagen
- 2008–2018: Borussia Dortmund

Senior career*
Years	Team	Apps	(Gls)
2017–2018	Borussia Dortmund II	0	(0)
2018–2020	Birmingham City	0	(0)
2018	→ Hungerford Town (loan)	0	(0)
2018–2019	→ Hungerford Town (loan)	20	(0)
2019–2020	→ Crawley Town (loan)	0	(0)
2020	→ AFC Telford United (loan)	5	(0)
2020–2021	VfB Lübeck	0	(0)
2021–2024	Sportfreunde Lotte	66	(0)
2024–	Wuppertaler SV	51	(0)
- * Club domestic league appearances and goals as of 24 June 2026

Michael Ngemba Luyambula (born 8 June 1999) is a professional footballer who plays as a goalkeeper for Regionalliga West club Wuppertaler SV.

Born in Germany, Luyambula came through Borussia Dortmund's youth system but was released without playing for the club's first team. He joined English second-tier club Birmingham City in 2018. He spent time on loan to Hungerford Town of the National League South in 2018–19, to League Two club Crawley Town in 2019–20, during which he played in the EFL Cup and EFL Trophy, and to AFC Telford United of the National League North in 2020. Released by Birmingham at the end of the 2019–20 season, he returned to Germany with VfB Lübeck, newly promoted to the 3. Liga. He moved on to Sportfreunde Lotte for the 2021–22 season.

Luyambula was named in a long list for the DR Congo under-20 team in 2018, and was called up to the senior squad's training camp in June 2017.

== Club career ==
=== Early life and club career ===
Luyambula was born in Neumünster, Germany. As a youngster he played for TSV Kronshagen before joining Borussia Dortmund's youth system as an under-12. He was an unused substitute for Borussia Dortmund II in a couple of Regionalliga matches in 2018, but was released without playing for the club's first team.

=== Birmingham City ===
Luyambula joined English Championship club Birmingham City on trial, and signed a short-term contract in August 2018. In compliance with transfer restrictions imposed on the club by the English Football League, he could play only for Birmingham's under-23 team, for which he made 12 appearances in the first half of the 2018–19 season.

==== Hungerford Town ====
He also spent three weeks on loan to Hungerford Town of the sixth-tier National League South in October, during which he made his senior debut in their FA Cup third qualifying round defeat by Wealdstone. In mid-December, he returned to Hungerford on loan for an initial month, and after the EFL gave their permission for his Birmingham contract to be extended to the end of the season, the loan was likewise extended. Luyumbula was the regular goalkeeper during the second half of Hungerford's season. He made 20 league appearances and helped his team avoid relegation in the final fixture.

==== Crawley Town ====
After Luyambula signed a one-year contract with Birmingham, he joined League Two (fourth-tier) club Crawley Town on loan for the 2019–20 season. Crawley manager Gabriele Cioffi hoped he would "put pressure on" established first-team goalkeeper Glenn Morris. Luyambula made his first competitive appearance for Crawley in the starting eleven for the EFL Cup first-round match away to Walsall on 13 August 2019; his team won 3–2. He kept his place for the next rounds of the competition, "punching and catching everything Norwich flung into his six-yard area" and keeping a clean sheet as Crawley beat the Premier League team, and then facing a penalty shoot-out to eliminate Stoke City. He also appeared in the EFL Trophy, but made no league appearances, and was recalled by his parent club in January 2020 with the intention of finding first-team football for him.

==== AFC Telford United ====
Luyambula signed for AFC Telford United on 30 January 2020 on loan until 16 May. He played five times in the National League North before the season was first suspended and then ended early because of the COVID-19 pandemic.

Birmingham confirmed in May 2020 that he would be released when his contract expired at the end of the season.

=== Return to German football ===
Luyambula returned to his native northern Germany and, on 4 June, signed a one-year contract with VfB Lübeck, newly promoted to the 3. Liga for the 2020–21 season. He spent the season as backup to Lukas Raeder, made no first-team appearances, and signed for Regionalliga West club Sportfreunde Lotte in August 2021 after a trial.

== International career ==
Luyambula was named in a 58-man long list for the DR Congo under-20 team in 2018, and was called up to the senior squad's training camp in June 2017.

== Career statistics ==
As of match played 25 September 2021

Appearances and goals by club, season and competition
Club	Season	League			National Cup (Note: Includes FA Cup, DFB-Pokal)		League Cup (Note: Includes EFL Cup)		Other		Total	
Club	Season	Division	Apps	Goals	Apps	Goals	Apps	Goals	Apps	Goals	Apps	Goals
Borussia Dortmund II	2017–18	Regionalliga West	0	0	—		—		—		0	0
Birmingham City	2018–19	Championship	—		—		—		—		—	
Birmingham City	2019–20	Championship	—		0	0	—		—		0	0
Birmingham City	Total		—		0	0	—		—		0	0
Hungerford Town (loan)	2018–19	National League South	20	0	1	0	—		—		21	0
Crawley Town (loan)	2019–20	League Two	0	0	0	0	4	0	3 (Note: Appearances in EFL Trophy)	0	7	0
AFC Telford United (loan)	2019–20	National League North	5	0	—		—		—		5	0
VfB Lübeck	2020–21	3. Liga	0	0	0	0	—		—		0	0
Sportfreunde Lotte	2021–22	Regionalliga West	5	0	0	0	—		0	0	5	0
Career total			30	0	1	0	4	0	3	0	38	0
