= Beryly Lubala =

DR Congolese footballer (born 1998)

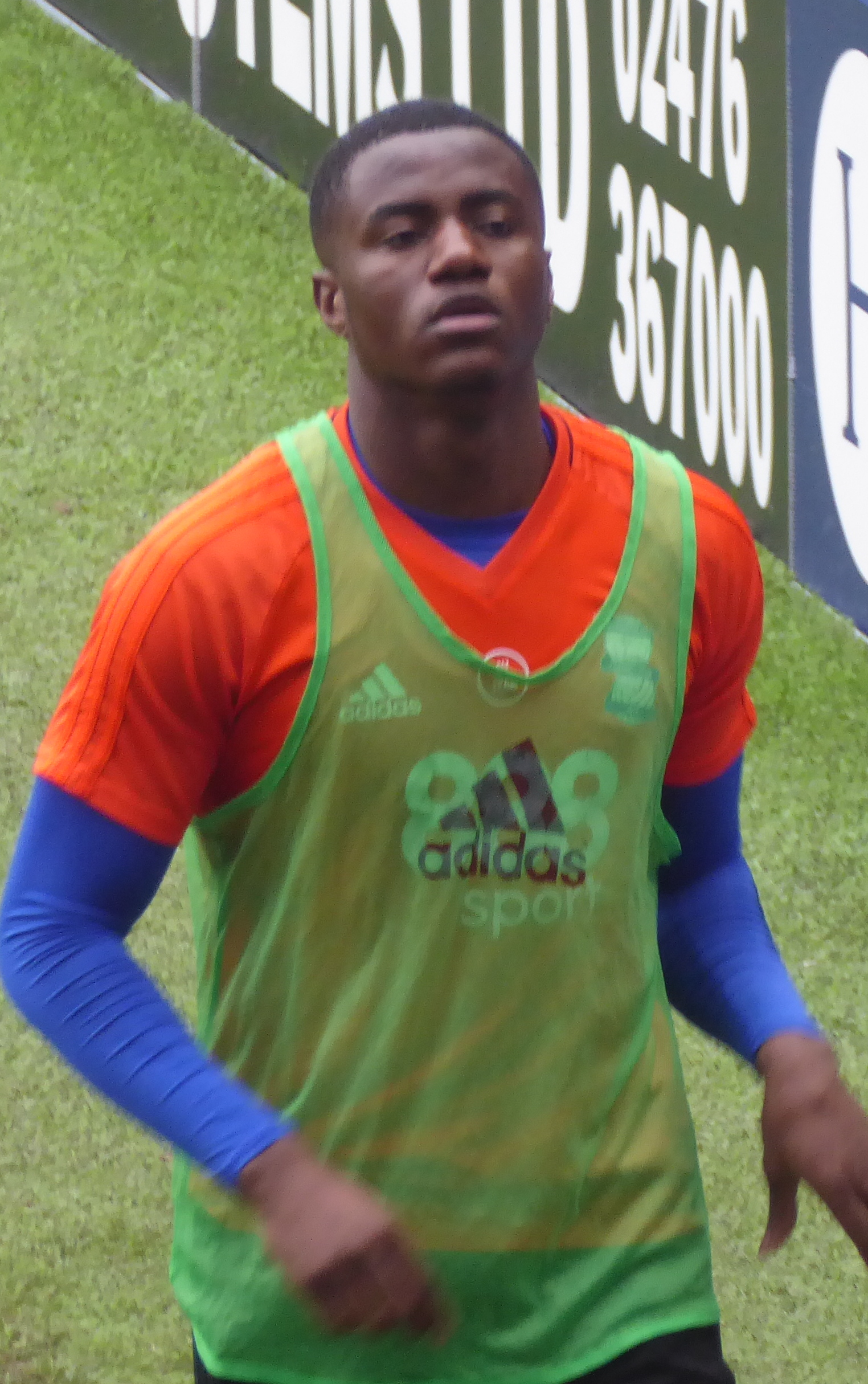
- Lubala with Birmingham City in April 2018

Personal information
- Full name: Beryly Logos Lubala
- Date of birth: 8 January 1998 (age 28)
- Place of birth: Democratic Republic of the Congo
- Height: 1.77 m (5 ft 10 in)
- Position: Forward

Team information
- Current team: Colchester United
- Number: 15

Youth career
- Carib SSFC
- Leicester Nirvana
- Friar Lane & Epworth
- 2014–2016: Birmingham City

Senior career*
Years	Team	Apps	(Gls)
2016–2019	Birmingham City	4	(0)
2019–2020	Crawley Town	34	(12)
2020–2023	Blackpool	12	(0)
2022	→ Northampton Town (loan)	14	(0)
2022–2023	→ Colchester United (loan)	8	(1)
2023–2024	Burton Albion	20	(5)
2024–2025	Wycombe Wanderers	41	(6)
2025–2026	Stevenage	32	(0)
2026–	Colchester United	4	(0)
- * Club domestic league appearances and goals as of 28 October 2026 (UTC)

Beryly Logos Lubala (born 8 January 1998), commonly known as Bez Lubala, is a Congolese footballer who plays as a forward for Colchester United.

== Life and career ==
Lubala was born in the Democratic Republic of the Congo and raised in Leicester, England, where he attended St Paul's Catholic School. As a youngster, he played football for Carib SSFC, Leicester Nirvana and Friar Lane & Epworth. He was noticed by representatives of Birmingham City's academy while playing in a trial game in 2014, and took up a scholarship with the club that summer. Interviewed later that year, he assessed his strength as his attacking play, and felt he needed to improve his left foot.

=== Birmingham City ===
He signed his first professional contract, of one year, in April 2016. A year later, after playing regularly for the under-23 team, he signed another one-year deal, with the option of a second year. He played in the first team's pre-season friendly against Kidderminster Harriers, and in February 2018, the club confirmed that it would be taking up their option on Lubala's contract. With Che Adams suspended and Isaac Vassell and Sam Gallagher injured, he was included on the bench for the Championship fixture at home to Burton Albion on 7 April. He remained unused, but made his debut three days later, away to Bristol City, replacing Jérémie Boga after 69 minutes with his team 2–1 behind; the match ended 3–1.

Lubala was a regular member of the first-team squad in 2018–19, and the first few months of the season was frequently included in the matchday squad. He made one start in the EFL Cup defeat to Reading and three fleeting substitute appearances in the Championship. At the end of the season he was offered a new contract, of one year with the option of a second, but no agreement could be reached between club and player.

=== Crawley Town ===
On 21 June 2019, Lubala signed a two-year contract with Crawley Town, managed by former Birmingham City coach Gabriele Cioffi. The deal included an option for a third year and an undisclosed sell-on clause. He scored in each of Crawley's first four League Two matches. Away to Carlisle United, he "shook off a challenge and cut in from the left before firing a low shot through the [goalkeeper's] legs" to tie the scores before the hosts won 2–1, and at home to Salford City, he converted a penalty to open the scoring and had several other chances as his side won 2–0. After goals against Scunthorpe United and Crewe Alexandra, Lubala's fifth goal of the season, a deflected finish in the 17th minute of a 1–0 EFL Cup win against Norwich City on 27 August 2019, gave Crawley a first ever victory over top-flight opposition. He said afterwards that "this was the best night of my short career so far". He had a strong season with Crawley, scoring 13 goals in 41 appearances in all competitions across the curtailed 2019–20 season.

=== Blackpool ===
On 1 September 2020, Lubala was signed by League One side Blackpool for an undisclosed fee, signing a three-year contract with the club.

Lubala joined Northampton Town on 31 January 2022 on loan for the rest of the season.

After making one appearance for his parent club in the 2022–23 EFL Cup, Lubala joined League Two club Colchester United on loan for the remainder of the season. He made his debut on 3 September as a half-time substitute with his side 1–0 down at home to Hartlepool United, and headed the equalising goal from Cameron Coxe's cross in the fifth minute of stoppage time.

He was released by Blackpool at the end of the 2022–23 season.

=== Burton Albion ===
On 2 September 2023, League One club Burton Albion confirmed the signing of Lubala on a short-term deal. He made his debut the same day, as a second-half substitute in a 1–0 defeat at home to Exeter City. He ended his spell with six goals from 26 matches in all competitions, and opted to reject Burton's offer of a further contract.

=== Wycombe Wanderers ===
Lubala signed a two-and-a-half-year contract with League One rivals Wycombe Wanderers on 30 January 2024.

On 20 May 2025, the club announced he would be leaving in June when his contract expired.

=== Stevenage ===
On 11 July, he joined League One side Stevenage. On 18 May 2026 he was released by Stevenage.

=== Colchester United ===
On September 25, he re-signed for Colchester United on a "short term deal", having been training with the Essex club for the previous fortnight. He made his second debut the following day as a 73rd minute substitute in a 2-2 draw with Shrewsbury Town.

== Career statistics ==
As of 28 September 2026

Appearances and goals by club, season and competition
Club	Season	League			FA Cup		EFL Cup		Other		Total	
Club	Season	Division	Apps	Goals	Apps	Goals	Apps	Goals	Apps	Goals	Apps	Goals
Birmingham City	2017–18	Championship	1	0	0	0	0	0	—		1	0
Birmingham City	2018–19	Championship	3	0	0	0	1	0	—		4	0
Birmingham City	Total		4	0	0	0	1	0	0	0	5	0
Crawley Town	2019–20	League Two	34	12	2	0	3	1	2 (Note: Appearance(s) in EFL Trophy)	0	41	13
Blackpool	2020–21	League One	12	0	4	0	0	0	4	0	20	0
Blackpool	2021–22	Championship	0	0	0	0	0	0	—		0	0
Blackpool	2022–23	Championship	0	0	—		1	0	—		0	0
Blackpool	Total		12	0	4	0	1	0	4	0	21	0
Northampton Town (loan)	2021–22	League Two	14	0	0	0	0	0	0	0	14	0
Colchester United (loan)	2022–23	League Two	8	1	1	0	—		3	0	12	1
Burton Albion	2023–24	League One	20	5	2	0	—		4	1	26	6
Wycombe Wanderers	2023–24	League One	14	2	—		—		—		14	2
Wycombe Wanderers	2024–25	League One	27	4	4	1	1	0	3	5	35	10
Wycombe Wanderers	Total		41	6	4	1	1	0	3	5	49	12
Stevenage	2025–26	League One	32	0	0	0	0	0	3 (Note: Two appearances and one goal in EFL Trophy, one appearance in League One play-offs)	1	35	1
Colchester United	2026–27	League Two	1	0	0	0	0	0	0	0	1	0
Colchester United	Total		9	1	1	0	—		3	0	13	1
Career total			166	24	13	1	6	1	19	7	204	33

== Personal life ==
On 26 January 2022, Lubala was found not guilty of rape by a Brighton jury.
