= Nathan Ferguson (footballer, born 1995) =

Guyanese footballer (born 1995)

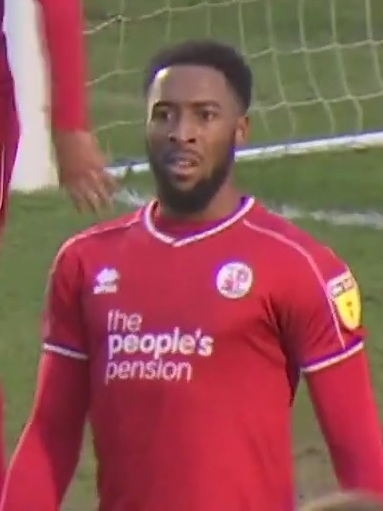
- Ferguson playing for Crawley Town in January 2020

Personal information
- Full name: Nathan James Decalvia Ferguson
- Date of birth: 12 October 1995 (age 31)
- Place of birth: Walthamstow, England
- Height: 1.78 m (5 ft 10 in)
- Position: Midfielder

Team information
- Current team: Hornchurch
- Number: 15

Youth career
- Norwich City

Senior career*
Years	Team	Apps	(Gls)
2013–2014	Dagenham & Redbridge	0	(0)
2013	→ Chelmsford City (loan)	1	(0)
2013–2014	→ St Albans City (loan)	4	(0)
2014	→ Hastings United (loan)	8	(0)
2014–2015	Billericay Town	3	(0)
2015	Grays Athletic	25	(1)
2015–2016	Burton Albion	0	(0)
2016	→ Dartford (loan)	7	(1)
2016–2017	Port Vale	0	(0)
2016	→ Southport (loan)	4	(0)
2017	Bromley	0	(0)
2017	→ Folkestone Invicta (loan)	3	(1)
2017–2019	Dulwich Hamlet	81	(9)
2019–2021	Crawley Town	40	(5)
2021–2022	Southend United	39	(3)
2022–2024	Wealdstone	89	(9)
2024–2025	Maidenhead United	36	(0)
2025–2026	Hartlepool United	11	(0)
2026–	Hornchurch	0	(0)

International career^{‡}
2024–	Guyana	11	(1)
- * Club domestic league appearances and goals as of 21:11, 29 June 2026 (UTC) ‡ National team caps and goals as of 17:18, 12 September 2025 (UTC)

Nathan James Decalvia Ferguson (born 12 October 1995) is a professional footballer who plays as a midfielder for National League club Hornchurch. Born in England, he represents the Guyana national team.

Ferguson spent his youth in the academies at Norwich City and Dagenham & Redbridge. He then spent the early part of his career moving between various clubs in the Southern League, Isthmian League and National League, including: Chelmsford City, St Albans City, Hastings United, Billericay Town, Grays Athletic, Dartford, Southport, Bromley and Folkestone Invicta. He also had two brief and unsuccessful spells in the English Football League with Burton Albion and Port Vale. He finally established himself at Dulwich Hamlet. He helped the club to win promotion out of the Isthmian League Premier Division at the end of the 2017–18 season. He earned a move to League Two club Crawley Town in June 2019 and changed clubs to Southend United 18 months later. He signed with National League side Wealdstone in February 2022 and remained with the club for two-and-a-half seasons before he signed with Maidenhead United. After one season with Maidenhead, he joined Hartlepool United in September 2025, and then moved on to Hornchurch in June 2026.

== Career ==
=== Early career ===
Ferguson started his career in Norwich City in their youth academy. He then transferred to Dagenham & Redbridge and joined their senior team. His goal against Gillingham Academy on 3 November 2012 was nominated for the November Football League Academy goal of the month competition.

On 14 August 2013, he joined Conference South club Chelmsford City on a one-month loan deal. He made his debut in senior football for the "Clarets", coming on as a 68th-minute substitute for Tom Derry in a 2–1 defeat at Tonbridge Angels, in what would be his only appearance for the club. On 20 December 2013, he joined St Albans City on a one-month loan. He played four Southern League Premier games for the "Saints". He ended the 2013–14 season at Isthmian League Division One South club Hastings United, though would score an own goal in extra time to gift Folkestone Invicta a 3–2 victory in the play-off semi-finals at Cheriton Road after he attempted to block a pass only to see the ball loop over his own keeper's head from 30 yards (27 m) out.

After being released by the "Daggers", he signed for Billericay Town of the Isthmian League Premier Division in September 2014. He was used as a winger by manager Craig Edwards, but lost his first-team place after picking up a hamstring injury. He signed for league rivals Grays Athletic in February 2015, in hope of more regular football. He helped the "Grays" to lose just one of their final 14 matches of the season, which left the club just one point outside the play-offs. He also played in the Isthmian League Cup final, which ended in a 3–2 defeat to Hendon. He impressed for the "Gravelmen", and praised managers Glen Little and Mark Bentley for allowing him the freedom to express himself. The club reported that Fleetwood Town made an illegal approach for the player in October 2015.

=== Burton Albion ===
Ferguson signed a two-and-a-half-year deal with League One side Burton Albion on 2 December 2015 after impressing manager Jimmy Floyd Hasselbaink on trial. In doing so he went against the advice of Grays manager Mark Bentley, who said that he should see out the season with Grays Athletic, saying that "sitting in U21 sides is not what they [Ferguson and Dumebi Dumaka] need". Nigel Clough replaced Hasselbaink as "Brewers" boss just two days later, and Ferguson failed to make an appearance at the Pirelli Stadium.

He was loaned to Dartford on 24 March 2016. He played seven National League South games for the "Darts", and scored the winning goal in a 2–1 victory over Maidstone United at the Gallagher Stadium on 9 April. He also played in the final of the Kent Senior Cup, where Dartford beat Charlton Athletic 3–1.

=== Port Vale ===
On 26 July 2016, Ferguson signed a one-year contract with Port Vale, becoming manager Bruno Ribeiro's 13th signing of the summer. He made his first and only appearance for the "Valiants" as a first-half substitute in an EFL Trophy match against Derby County Under 23s at Vale Park on 30 August.

On 8 October, he joined National League side Southport on a month-long loan. He played seven games for Steve Burr's "Sandgrounders". Ferguson left Vale by mutual consent on 30 January 2017 after coming to an agreement with new boss Michael Brown on the remainder of his contract.

=== Bromley to Dulwich ===
Ferguson returned to the National League, signing with Bromley in March 2017. However, his only appearance for the "Ravens" came in the Kent Senior Cup. He signed on loan for Folkestone Invicta towards the end of the 2016–17 season. He featured in three Isthmian League Premier Division games for the "Seasiders", scoring one goal.

He signed for Dulwich Hamlet on 1 July 2017. He scored seven goals from 52 appearances in the 2017–18 season, and played in the play-off final victory over Hendon that secured the club promotion out of the Isthmian League. He remained a key player at Champion Hill in the National League South, scoring three goals from 39 games in the 2018–19 campaign.

=== Crawley Town ===
On 14 June 2019, Ferguson signed for League Two club Crawley Town on a three-year deal for an undisclosed fee. On 3 August, he made his professional debut, playing the full 90 minutes away to Carlisle United. He scored his first goal for the "Red Devils" seven days later, in a 2–0 victory against Salford City at Broadfield Stadium. On 24 September, he scored the equalizing goal in a 1–1 draw with Stoke City in the EFL Cup, before Crawley won the tie on penalties. He maintained his first-team place after John Yems replaced Gabriele Cioffi as manager in December and totaled six goals in 39 appearances throughout the truncated 2019–20 season.

=== Southend United ===
On 29 January 2021, he signed for Southend United for an undisclosed fee on an 18-month contract with the option of a further year. He scored his first goal for Southend on his debut the following day in a 5–1 defeat at former club Port Vale, after coming on as a substitute. Manager Mark Molesley described his debut goal as the only positive of the match. On 24 February, he scored a 'sensational' goal from 40 yards (37 m) in a 3–1 win at Forest Green Rovers. Former manager Phil Brown returned to the club in April but he could not help Southend to avoid relegation out of the Football League at the end of the 2020–21 season. He made 24 appearances in the first half of the 2021–22 season before his contract was mutually terminated on 3 February 2022.

=== Wealdstone ===
On 4 February 2022, Ferguson joined National League club Wealdstone on a free transfer. He made his debut four days for the "Stones" later in a 2–1 victory against Yeovil Town at Grosvenor Vale, and then scored his first Wealdstone goal on 12 February, in a 3–1 win over local rivals Barnet. He scored five goals in forty appearances in the 2022–23 campaign, though was sent off on the last day of the season. He scored five goals in 38 games in 2023–24, before being released at the end of the season.

=== Maidenhead United ===
On 25 June 2024, Ferguson signed for National League side Maidenhead United. He made 40 appearances in the 2024–25 campaign, which culminated in relegation into the sixth tier. He left the club at the end of the season.

=== Hartlepool United ===
Ferguson signed for Hartlepool United on 12 September 2025 after impressing manager Simon Grayson on trial. Ferguson commented that the crowd at Victoria Park were always very vocal against him as an opposition player, so he was looking forward to hearing them cheering him on. He was released upon the expiry of his contract at the end of the 2025–26 season.

=== Hornchurch ===
On 23 June 2026, Ferguson joined newly promoted National League side Hornchurch, where manager Daryl McMahon said he had known him since his time as a youth team player at Dagenham & Redbridge.

== International career ==
Ferguson made his debut for Guyana on 21 March 2024, in a 2024 FIFA Series match against Cape Verde in Jeddah.

== Style of play ==
Primarily a midfielder, Ferguson has also played as a forward and has pace, power and skill. Ferguson described himself as a box-to-box midfielder when he signed for Maidenhead in 2024.

== Career statistics ==
=== Club ===
As of 25 April 2026

Appearances and goals by club, season and competition
Club	Season	League			FA Cup		League Cup		Other		Total	
Club	Season	Division	Apps	Goals	Apps	Goals	Apps	Goals	Apps	Goals	Apps	Goals
Dagenham & Redbridge	2013–14	League Two	0	0	0	0	0	0	0	0	0	0
Chelmsford City (loan)	2013–14	Conference South	1	0	0	0	—		0	0	1	0
St Albans City (loan)	2013–14	Southern League Premier	4	0	0	0	—		0	0	4	0
Hastings United (loan)	2013–14	Isthmian League Division One South	8	0	0	0	—		0	0	8	0
Billericay Town	2014–15	Isthmian League Premier Division	3	0	1	0	—		1 (Note: Appearance in the Essex Senior Cup.)	0	5	0
Grays Athletic	2014–15	Isthmian League Premier Division	15	1	0	0	—		2 (Note: Appearance(s) in the Isthmian League Cup.)	0	17	1
Grays Athletic	2015–16	Isthmian League Premier Division	10	0	0	0	—		0	0	10	0
Grays Athletic	Total		25	1	0	0	0	0	2	0	27	1
Burton Albion	2015–16	League One	0	0	0	0	0	0	0	0	0	0
Dartford (loan)	2015–16	National League South	7	1	0	0	—		0	0	7	1
Port Vale	2016–17	League One	0	0	0	0	0	0	1 (Note: Appearances in the EFL Trophy)	0	1	0
Southport (loan)	2016–17	National League	4	0	3	0	—		0	0	7	0
Bromley	2016–17	National League	0	0	0	0	—		1 (Note: Appearances in the Kent Senior Cup)	0	1	0
Folkestone Invicta (loan)	2016–17	Isthmian League Premier Division	3	1	0	0	—		0	0	3	1
Dulwich Hamlet	2017–18	Isthmian League Premier Division	43	6	2	0	—		7 (Note: 2 appearances and 1 goal in the FA Trophy, 3 appearances in the Alan Turvey Trophy and 2 appearances in the play-offs)	1	52	7
Dulwich Hamlet	2018–19	National League South	38	3	0	0	—		1 (Note: Appearances in the FA Trophy)	0	39	3
Dulwich Hamlet	Total		81	9	2	0	0	0	8	1	91	10
Crawley Town	2019–20	League Two	31	5	2	0	4	1	2	0	39	6
Crawley Town	2020–21	League Two	9	0	0	0	1	0	3	1	13	1
Crawley Town	Total		40	5	2	0	5	1	5	1	52	7
Southend United	2020–21	League Two	19	2	0	0	0	0	0	0	19	2
Southend United	2021–22	National League	20	1	2	1	—		2	0	24	2
Southend United	Total		39	3	2	1	0	0	2	0	43	4
Wealdstone	2021–22	National League	17	1	0	0	—		0	0	17	1
Wealdstone	2022–23	National League	39	5	0	0	—		1	0	40	5
Wealdstone	2023–24	National League	33	3	1	1	—		4	1	38	5
Wealdstone	Total		89	9	1	1	0	0	5	1	95	11
Maidenhead United	2024–25	National League	36	0	1	0	—		3 (Note: One appearance in FA Trophy, two appearances in the National League Cup)	0	40	0
Hartlepool United	2025–26	National League	11	0	2	1	—		1	0	14	1
Hornchurch	2026–27	National League South	0	0	0	0	—		0	0	0	0
Career total			351	28	14	3	5	1	29	3	399	35

=== International ===
As of match played 10 June 2025

Appearances and goals by national team and year
National team	Year	Apps	Goals
Guyana	2024	8	0
Guyana	2025	3	1
Total		11	1

=== International goals ===
Scores and results list Guyana's goal tally first.

No.	Date	Venue	Opponent	Score	Result	Competition
1.	10 June 2025	Synthetic Track and Field Facility, Leonora, Guyana	Montserrat	1–0	3–0	2026 FIFA World Cup qualification

== Honours ==
Grays Athletic

- Isthmian League Cup runner-up: 2015

Dartford

- Kent Senior Cup: 2016

Dulwich Hamlet

- Isthmian League Premier Division play-offs: 2018
