= David Sesay =

Sierra Leonean footballer

Personal information
- Full name: David Junior Deen Sesay
- Date of birth: 18 September 1998 (age 28)
- Place of birth: Brent, England
- Height: 6 ft 0 in (1.84 m)
- Position: Defender

Team information
- Current team: Hemel Hempstead Town

Youth career
- 2007–2018: Watford

Senior career*
Years	Team	Apps	(Gls)
2018–2021	Crawley Town	56	(0)
2021	Barnet	6	(0)
2021–2023	Wealdstone	27	(0)
2022–2023	→ Weymouth (loan)	24	(2)
2023	Weymouth	10	(0)
2023–2025	Eastbourne Borough	57	(2)
2025–2026	Maidstone United	45	(1)
2026–	Hemel Hempstead Town	0	(0)

International career^{‡}
2021–	Sierra Leone	4	(0)
- * Club domestic league appearances and goals as of 14:06, 15 August 2026 (UTC) ‡ National team caps and goals as of 10:12, 17 May 2021 (UTC)

David Junior Deen Sesay (born 18 September 1998) is a professional footballer who plays as a defender for National League South club Hemel Hempstead Town. Born in England, he represented the Sierra Leone national team.

== Club career ==
=== Early career ===
Born in Brent, Sesay joined Watford in 2007, turning professional in June 2016. On 13 April 2018, it was announced that Sesay along with numerous other graduates, were to leave Watford at the end of their contracts in June.

=== Crawley Town ===
Proceeding his release, Sesay opted to join League Two club Crawley Town on a two-year deal. On 4 September 2018, Sesay made his Crawley debut during their EFL Trophy group-stage tie against Tottenham Hotspur U23s, featuring for just under 20 minutes and scoring the winning penalty in the shootout. He made his league debut on 29 December 2018, starting in a 0–0 draw away to Newport County. At the end of the season, he was awarded Crawley Town's Young Player of the Year award. In June 2020, Sesay signed a one-year contract extension with the club. He was released by Crawley Town at the end of the 2020–21 season.

=== Barnet ===
Sesay joined Barnet on a one-month rolling contract on 24 August 2021.

=== Wealdstone ===
On 26 November 2021, Sesay signed for Wealdstone.

Sesay joined Weymouth on loan in December 2022. The loan was later extended for a month.

At the end of the 2022–23 season, Sesay was released by Wealdstone.

=== Weymouth ===
On 11 August 2023, Sesay signed for Weymouth.

=== Eastbourne Borough ===
On 23 November 2023, Sesay signed for Eastbourne Borough.

=== Maidstone United ===
On 10 June 2025, Sesay joined National League South rivals Maidstone United. He departed the club at the end of the 2025–26 season.

=== Hemel Hempstead Town ===
On 14 August 2026, Sesay joined National League South side Hemel Hempstead Town.

== International career ==
Born in England, Sesay is of Kenyan and Sierra Leonean descent. He was called up to the Kenya national football team in March 2019, although he turned down the call-up in order to help Crawley Town in their relegation battle. In October 2021 he was called-up by the Sierra Leone national football team for friendly fixtures that month. He debuted for Sierra Leone in a 1–1 friendly tie with South Sudan on 7 October 2021.

Sesay was named in Sierra Leone's squad for the 2021 Africa Cup of Nations, but did not make an appearance at the tournament.

== Career statistics ==
=== Club ===
As of end of 2025–26 season

Appearances and goals by club, season and competition
Club	Season	League			FA Cup		League Cup		Other		Total	
Club	Season	Division	Apps	Goals	Apps	Goals	Apps	Goals	Apps	Goals	Apps	Goals
Crawley Town	2018–19	League Two	18	0	0	0	0	0	3 (Note: Appearance(s) in EFL Trophy)	0	21	0
Crawley Town	2019–20	League Two	25	0	2	0	3	0	1	0	31	0
Crawley Town	2020–21	League Two	13	0	2	0	1	0	2	0	18	0
Crawley Town	Total		56	0	4	0	4	0	6	0	70	0
Barnet	2021–22	National League	6	0	0	0	—		0	0	6	0
Wealdstone	2021–22	National League	13	0	0	0	—		0	0	13	0
Wealdstone	2022–23	National League	14	0	1	0	—		0	0	15	0
Wealdstone	Total		27	0	1	0	0	0	0	0	28	0
Weymouth (loan)	2022–23	National League South	24	2	0	0	—		0	0	24	2
Weymouth	2023–24	National League South	10	0	1	0	—		0	0	11	0
Eastbourne Borough	2023–24	National League South	19	1	0	0	—		1 (Note: Appearance(s) in Sussex Senior Cup)	0	20	1
Eastbourne Borough	2024–25	National League South	38	1	1	0	—		6 (Note: Two appearances in FA Trophy, four appearances in Sussex Senior Cup)	0	45	1
Eastbourne Borough	Total		57	2	1	0	0	0	7	0	65	2
Maidstone United	2025–26	National League South	45	1	1	0	—		2 (Note: Appearance(s) in FA Trophy)	0	48	1
Career total			225	5	8	0	4	0	15	0	252	5

=== International ===
As of match played 29 March 2022

Appearances and goals by national team and year
National team	Year	Apps	Goals
Sierra Leone	2021	2	0
Sierra Leone	2022	2	0
Total		4	0
