= Josh Doherty =

Northern Irish footballer

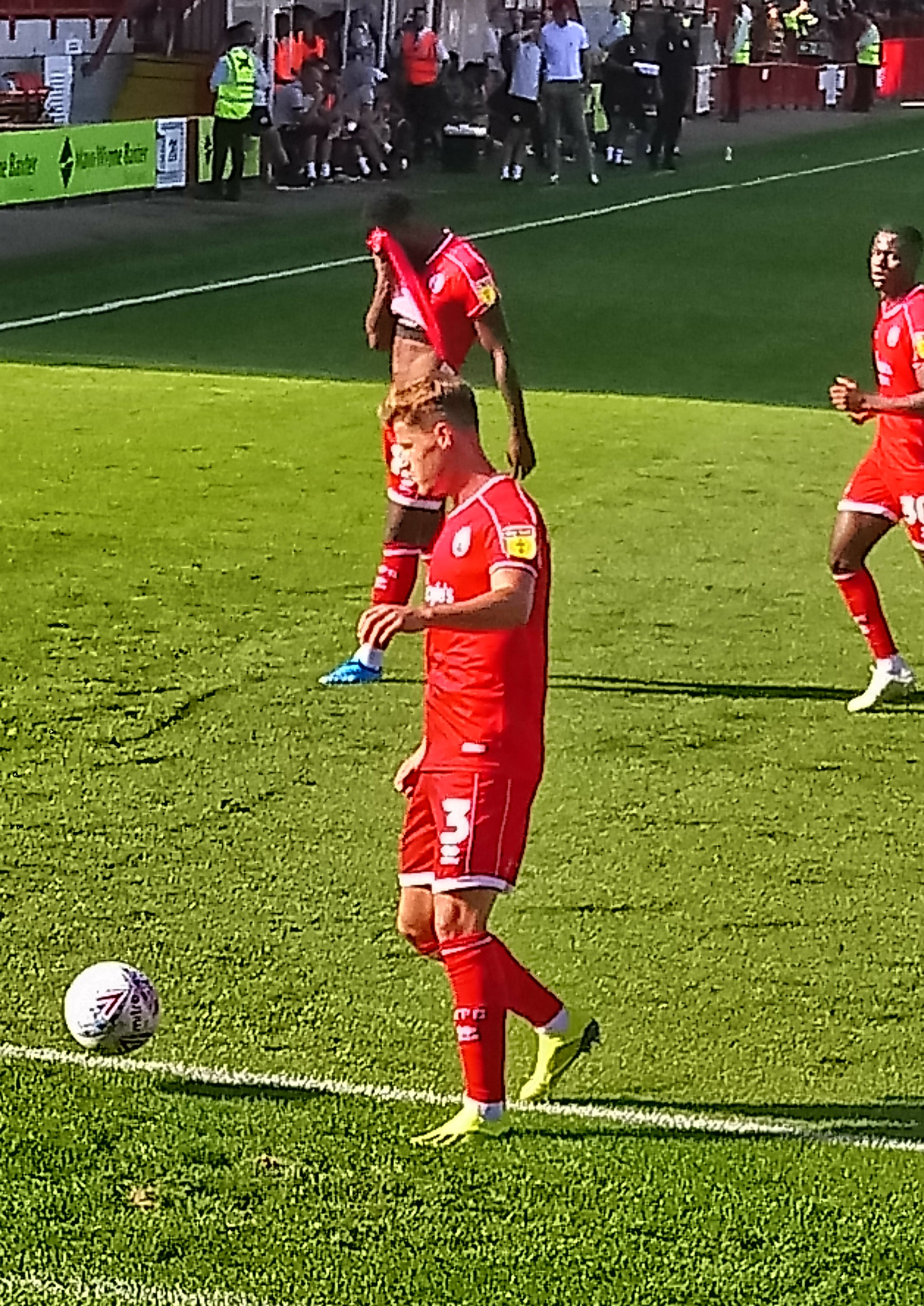
- Doherty playing for Crawley Town in September 2019

Personal information
- Full name: Josh Doherty
- Date of birth: 15 March 1996 (age 30)
- Place of birth: Newtownards, Northern Ireland
- Height: 1.79 m (5 ft 10 in)
- Position: Left-back

Team information
- Current team: Hyde United

Youth career
- –2012: Ards
- 2012–2014: Watford

Senior career*
Years	Team	Apps	(Gls)
2014–2016	Watford	1	(0)
2016–2017	Leyton Orient	0	(0)
2016	→ Altrincham (loan)	3	(0)
2017	Ards	8	(0)
2017–2021	Crawley Town	79	(0)
2021	→ Colchester United (loan)	5	(0)
2021	Barnet	3	(0)
2022	Portadown	15	(0)
2022	South Shields	0	(0)
2023	Spennymoor	8	(0)
2023	→ Hyde United (loan)	3	(0)
2023-	Hyde United	22	(2)

International career^{‡}
2011–2013	Northern Ireland U17	8	(1)
2013–2014	Northern Ireland U19	6	(1)
2014–2017	Northern Ireland U21	6	(1)
- * Club domestic league appearances and goals as of 19:56, 29 April 2024 (UTC) ‡ National team caps and goals as of 10:47, 12 November 2017 (UTC)

Josh Doherty is a Northern Irish professional footballer who plays for Hyde United.

Doherty started his senior career at Watford before joining Leyton Orient in 2016. After a loan spell at Altrincham, he left by mutual consent in January 2017 and joined Ards. He joined EFL League Two club Crawley Town in September 2017 and made 94 appearances in four years at the club before being released in summer 2021, having spent the second half of the 2020–21 season on loan at Colchester United. He signed for Barnet in July 2021. He has also played for Northern Ireland at under-17, under-19 and under-21 levels.

== Early life ==
Doherty was born in Newtownards, Northern Ireland.

== Club career ==
=== Early career ===
After playing youth football for Ards, Doherty signed a two-year scholarship with Watford in April 2012. Doherty made his debut on 3 May 2014, coming on as a substitute in the 80th minute in the 4–1 defeat against Huddersfield Town. On 14 May 2014, Doherty signed his first professional contract after completing his scholarship. However, his first team chances was soon limited, as well as, the club's reserve no longer available. On 3 June 2016, it was announced that Doherty would leave Watford upon his contract expiry.

=== Leyton Orient and return to Ards ===
On 6 June 2016, Doherty joined League Two side Leyton Orient on a one-year deal. On 13 September, Doherty joined National League North side Altrincham on a month's loan. By mutual consent he left Orient on 3 January 2017. Orient went on to be relegated to the national league at the end of the 2016/17 season. Doherty returned to his home club Ards.

After leaving Leyton Orient, Doherty returned to Northern Ireland to sign for hometown club Ards on a short-term deal. A month later, he made his debut during their 3–0 away victory over Portadown, featuring for 64 minutes before being replaced by David McCullough. Doherty went onto feature seven more times before leaving at the end of his contract in June 2017.

=== Crawley Town ===
On 5 September 2017, it was announced that Doherty had joined League Two side Crawley Town. Four days later, he made his debut during Crawley's 3–1 away defeat against Colchester United, replacing Mark Randall in the 64th minute. In Crawley's following fixture, against Stevenage, Doherty was rewarded with his first start under manager, Harry Kewell and went onto feature for 60 minutes in the 1–1 draw. On 2 May 2018, after an impressive debut season, Doherty was rewarded with a new two-year deal running until 2020. Doherty made 18 appearances across the 2018–19 season, whilst he made 31 appearances for the club during 2019–20. In June 2020, Doherty signed a one-year contract extension with the club.

Doherty joined Colchester United on loan until the end of the season on 1 February 2021. Doherty made 5 appearances on loan at the club but was released by Crawley Town upon the expiry of his contract at the end of the season.

=== Barnet ===
On 2 July 2021, Doherty signed for National League club Barnet on an initial one-year deal under new manager Harry Kewell. Doherty was sent off on his debut against Notts County and two games later was sent off again against Grimsby Town.

=== South Shields ===
Doherty returned to his native Northern Ireland in January 2022 for a short stint with NIFL Premiership club Portadown, helping the club in their battle to stay in the NIFL premiership and making appearances during the premiership playoffs. Doherty returned to England in June 2022 to sign for Northern Premier League Premier Division club South Shields. He went on to make 22 appearances for the side, helping them secure promotion to the National League North at the end of the 2022/23 season.

== International career ==
Doherty has represented Northern Ireland at under-17, under-19 and under-21 level.

== Career statistics ==
As of 5 November 2021

Appearances and goals by club, season and competition
Club	Season	League			National Cup		League Cup		Other		Total	
Club	Season	Division	Apps	Goals	Apps	Goals	Apps	Goals	Apps	Goals	Apps	Goals
Watford	2013–14	Championship	1	0	0	0	0	0	0	0	1	0
Watford	2014–15	Championship	0	0	0	0	0	0	0	0	0	0
Watford	2015–16	Premier League	0	0	0	0	0	0	0	0	0	0
Watford	Total		1	0	0	0	0	0	0	0	1	0
Leyton Orient	2016–17	League Two	0	0	0	0	0	0	0	0	0	0
Altrincham (loan)	2016–17	National League North	3	0	1	0	—		0	0	4	0
Ards	2016–17	NIFL Premiership	8	0	0	0	0	0	—		8	0
Crawley Town	2017–18	League Two	15	0	1	0	0	0	1 (Note: Appearance(s) in EFL Trophy)	0	17	0
Crawley Town	2018–19	League Two	18	0	1	0	1	0	2	0	22	0
Crawley Town	2019–20	League Two	31	0	1	0	4	0	1	0	37	0
Crawley Town	2020–21	League Two	15	0	2	0	0	0	1	0	18	0
Crawley Town	Total		79	0	5	0	5	0	5	0	94	0
Colchester United (loan)	2020–21	League Two	5	0	—		—		0	0	5	0
Barnet	2021–22	National League	3	0	0	0	—		0	0	3	0
Career total			99	0	6	0	5	0	5	0	115	0

== Honours ==
South Shields

- Northern Premier League: 2022–23
