= Reece Grego-Cox =

English footballer (born 1996)

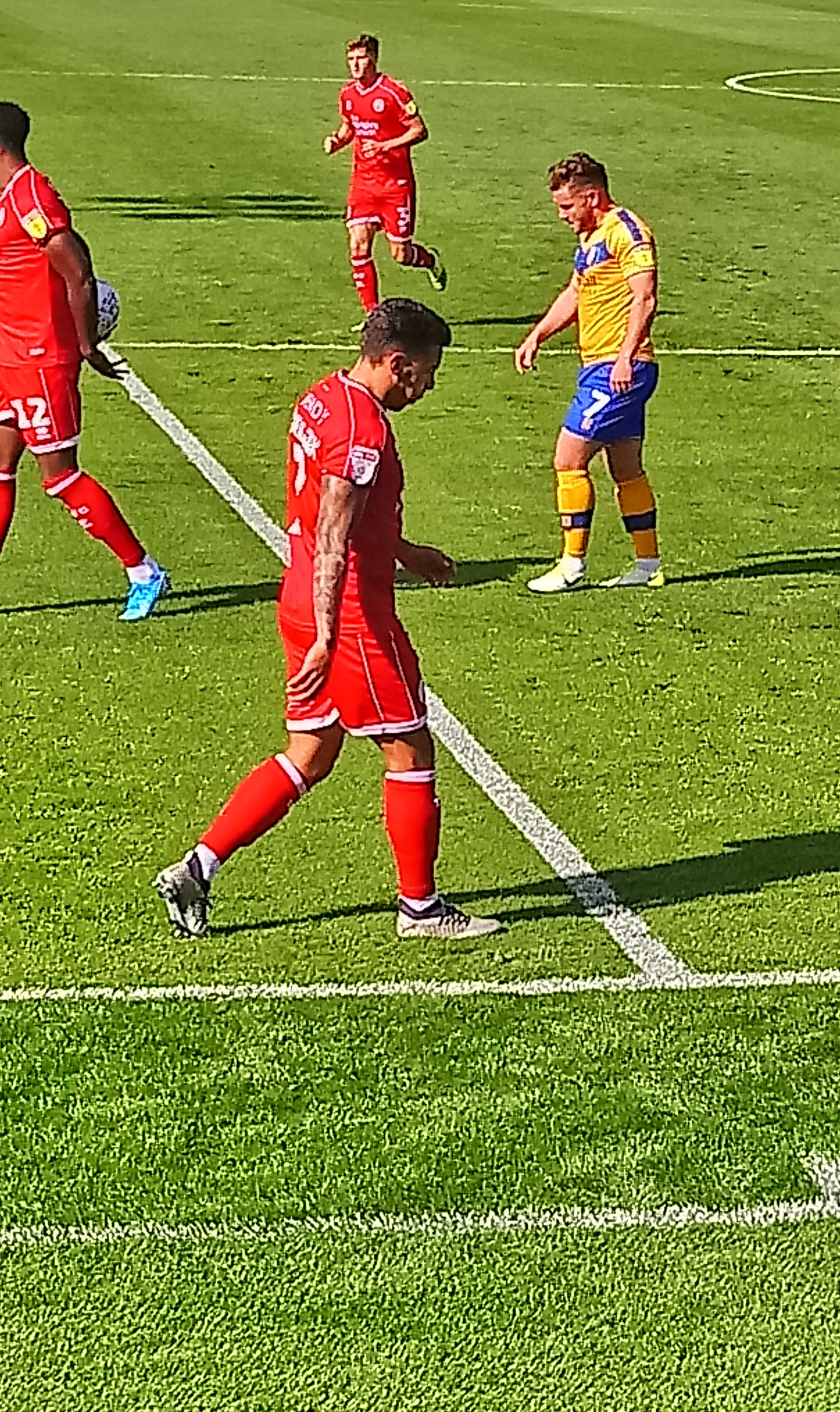
- Grego-Cox playing for Crawley Town in 2019

Personal information
- Full name: Reece Randall Grego-Cox
- Date of birth: 12 November 1996 (age 30)
- Place of birth: Hammersmith, England
- Height: 5 ft 9 in (1.74 m)
- Positions: Striker; winger

Team information
- Current team: Hampton & Richmond Borough
- Number: 9

Youth career
- Bedfont Sports
- 2010–2015: Queens Park Rangers

Senior career*
Years	Team	Apps	(Gls)
2015–2018	Queens Park Rangers	5	(0)
2016	→ Newport County (loan)	7	(0)
2018	Woking	18	(4)
2018–2022	Crawley Town	66	(6)
2022	→ Barnet (loan)	13	(3)
2022–2025	Woking	33	(15)
2024–2025	→ Dagenham & Redbridge (loan)	16	(1)
2025–	Hampton & Richmond Borough	46	(10)

International career^{‡}
2013	Republic of Ireland U17	3	(1)
2014–2015	Republic of Ireland U19	6	(2)
2015–2018	Republic of Ireland U21	11	(4)
- * Club domestic league appearances and goals as of 11:42, 27 September 2026 (UTC) ‡ National team caps and goals as of 13:07, 29 March 2018 (UTC)

Reece Randall Grego-Cox (born 12 November 1996) is a professional footballer who plays as a forward for National League South club Hampton & Richmond Borough.

He joined Queens Park Rangers in 2010 after a prolific season for Bedfont Eagles under-14. He was first selected for a matchday squad in January 2015, and made his debut in the Premier League in March. In late 2016, he had a short loan at Newport County in League Two. He was released by QPR in January 2018 and joined Woking of the National League. He went onto feature eighteen times, scoring four goals before leaving for Crawley Town in July. Grego-Cox returned to Woking in July 2022 and went onto feature sixteen times, scoring nine goals during the 2022–23 campaign. This ultimately resulted in a new two-and-half-year deal in February 2023. He went onto feature for Dagenham & Redbridge on a season-long loan before leaving Woking at the end of his contract in June 2025. A month later, he agreed to join National League South club, Hampton & Richmond Borough.

Born in England, Grego-Cox chose to represent the Republic of Ireland at international level. He has featured for them up to under-21 level.

== Club career ==
Born in Hammersmith, London, Grego-Cox joined Queens Park Rangers at the age of 13 in 2010, after scoring nearly 60 goals in a season for Bedfont Eagles under-14.

In the 2014–15 season, while a part of the Queens Park Rangers Under-18 team, he was also a regular with the Under-21s under Steve Gallen, scoring 4 goals in 7 starts. In August 2014, with the Under-18 team, he scored from 50 yards in a 3–2 win over Manchester City, which the Daily Mirror compared to a goal by David Beckham in 1996.

He signed his first professional contract with the club on 22 December 2014, a two-and-a-half-year deal lasting until 2017. He said "It's really weird actually. Growing up watching QPR and then being in the position you wish you were, playing for QPR. It's a great feeling." He took part in a friendly on the same day with the first team against Southend United, coming on as a 77th-minute substitute for Niko Kranjčar and scoring with his first touch in a 3–2 victory.

Grego-Cox was included in a matchday squad for the first time on 4 January 2015, remaining an unused substitute as they lost 0–3 to League One side Sheffield United at Loftus Road in the third round of the FA Cup. He made his professional debut on 7 March, replacing Karl Henry for the last two minutes of a 1–2 home defeat against Tottenham Hotspur in the Premier League.

After two more substitute appearances, he was given his first start on 24 May, playing the full 90 minutes as relegated QPR ended the season with a 5–1 defeat away to Leicester City. On 31 August 2016, Grego-Cox joined League Two club Newport County on loan until 31 January 2017. He made his debut on 3 September by starting at home to Barnet but the match was abandoned at half time due to a waterlogged pitch. He returned to QPR on 7 December after his loan was cut short due to injury. On 12 January 2018, Grego-Cox left Queens Park Rangers by mutual consent, alongside teammate Michael Petrasso.

Following his release from QPR, Grego-Cox joined National League side Woking on a deal until the end of the season. A day later, he made his debut in a 1–0 home defeat against Tranmere Rovers, replacing Declan Appau in the 54th minute. On 23 January, Grego-Cox scored his first career goal to open a 1–1 draw at Gateshead. Grego-Cox went onto score three more times for the Cards before leaving the club following their relegation to the National League South.

On 16 July 2018, Grego-Cox made the move to League Two side Crawley Town on a two-year deal, following a successful trial period. He signed a new contract, running until 2022, in July 2019. In February 2022, he joined Barnet on loan until the end of the season. Grego-Cox was released at the end of the 2021–22 season.

On 15 June 2022, Grego-Cox agreed to return to Woking ahead of the 2022–23 campaign, signing a one-year deal following his release from Crawley. Upon returning to the Surrey-based club for his first campaign back, Grego-Cox made 18 appearances across all competitions, netting nine goals. Notably, he scored in six consecutive league matches between October and November. His impressive form earned him a new two-and-a-half-year contract extension in February 2023. On 4 June 2024, Grego-Cox joined National League rivals Dagenham & Redbridge on a season-long loan deal. He went onto feature eighteen times, scoring once for the Daggers before returning to Woking in June.

On 11 July 2025, following his departure from Woking, Grego-Cox agreed to join National League South club Hampton & Richmond Borough.

== International career ==
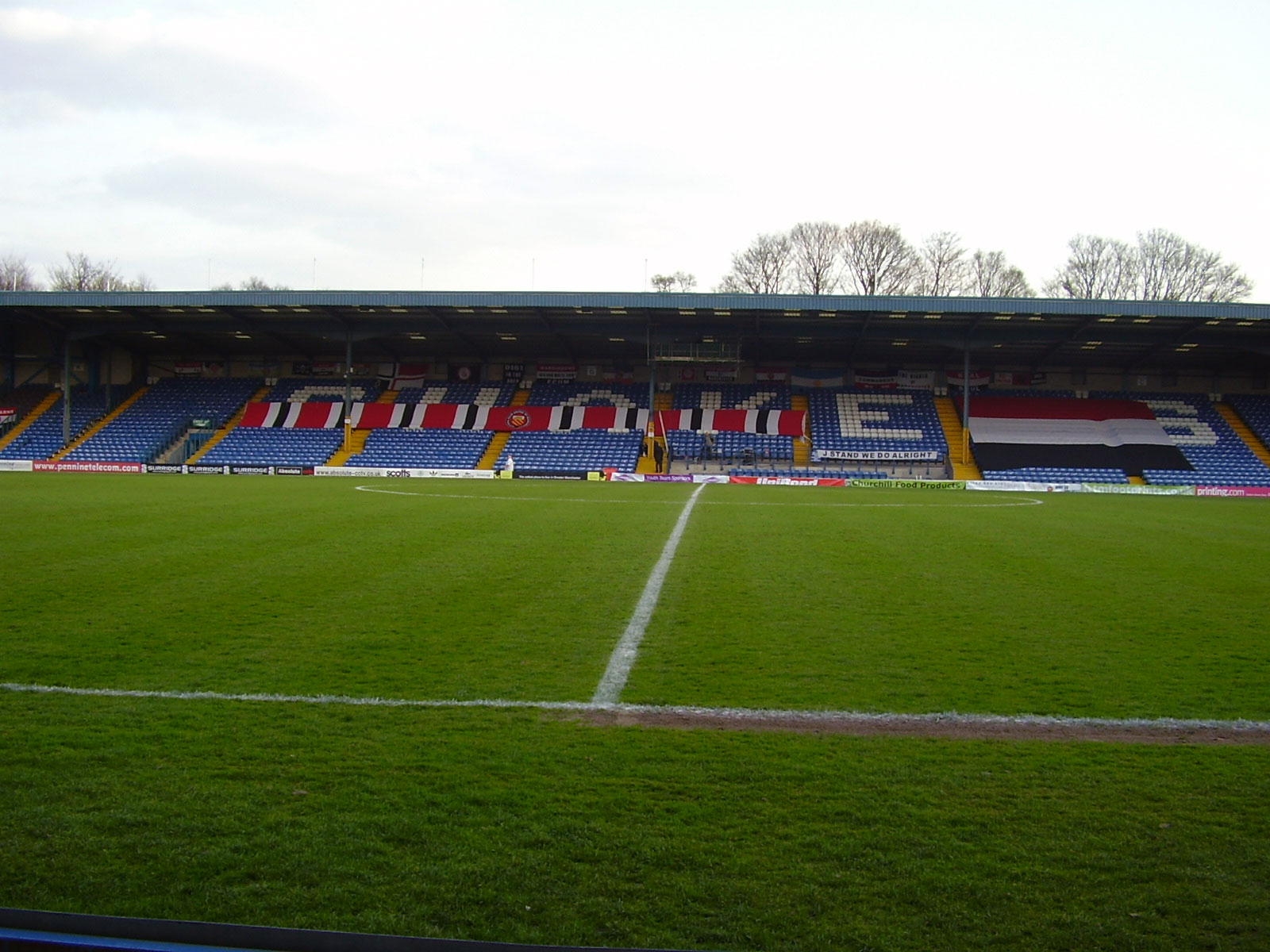
Grego-Cox scored on his under-21 debut at Gigg Lane

Although born in England, Grego-Cox represents the Republic of Ireland at international level qualifying to do so through his grandparents. He began in the Under-17 team, in their elite round for the 2013 European Championship. He made his debut on 25 March 2013 against Austria, scoring the only goal of the game in Schwechat in the 22nd minute. He also featured in the two other games of the round against Georgia and Serbia, as group hosts Austria advanced to the finals.

On 13 November 2014, Grego-Cox made his debut for the Under-19s as they hosted their group in the qualifying round for the 2015 European Championship, starting in a 1–0 win over Malta at the Regional Sports Centre in Waterford. Two days later, he opened the scoring in the 3rd minute of a 4–1 victory against Gibraltar at Ferrycarrig Park in Wexford, and on 18 November in Waterford he netted the equaliser for a 1–1 draw with Switzerland. The Republic of Ireland came second in their group and advanced to the elite round.

On 4 September 2015, Grego-Cox made his under-21s debut, coming on as a second-half substitute for Sean Kavanagh in their 4–1 win over Qatar at Gigg Lane in Bury; he scored their third goal. In qualification for the 2019 European Championship on 9 October 2017, he scored a hat-trick in a 4–0 home win over Israel, including a goal after 40 seconds.

== Style of play ==
In May 2014, The Irish Post named Grego-Cox as one of 10 young British-based prospects for the Republic of Ireland. They noted how his "pace and aggressive style of play" had proven successful with the international under-17 team, but acknowledged concerns over his temperament, despite concluding that "a competitive edge didn't do Roy Keane much harm".

Queens Park Rangers under-18 manager Steve Gallen compared Grego-Cox to first-team player Charlie Austin in August 2014, saying "They are tenacious, they cause problems for defenders and they can score goals. They won't give you a moments [sic] rest. Like Charlie has done at times for the first team, Reece creates a goal out of nothing".

== Career statistics ==
As of match played 26 September 2026

Appearances and goals by club, season and competition
Club	Season	League			FA Cup		League Cup		Other		Total	
Club	Season	Division	Apps	Goals	Apps	Goals	Apps	Goals	Apps	Goals	Apps	Goals
Queens Park Rangers	2014–15	Premier League	4	0	0	0	0	0	—		4	0
Queens Park Rangers	2015–16	Championship	0	0	0	0	1	0	—		1	0
Queens Park Rangers	2016–17	Championship	1	0	0	0	0	0	—		1	0
Queens Park Rangers	Total		5	0	0	0	1	0	—		6	0
Newport County (loan)	2016–17	League Two	7	0	—		—		1 (Note: Appearance in EFL Trophy)	0	8	0
Woking	2017–18	National League	18	4	—		—		—		18	4
Crawley Town	2018–19	League Two	28	2	2	0	1	0	1	0	32	2
Crawley Town	2019–20	League Two	28	4	2	2	4	0	0	0	34	6
Crawley Town	2020–21	League Two	0	0	0	0	0	0	0	0	0	0
Crawley Town	2021–22	League Two	10	0	0	0	0	0	1	0	11	0
Crawley Town	Total		91	10	4	2	5	0	3	0	103	12
Barnet (loan)	2021–22	National League	13	3	—		—		—		13	3
Woking	2022–23	National League	16	9	2	0	—		0	0	18	9
Woking	2023–24	National League	17	6	2	1	—		1 (Note: Appearance(s) in FA Trophy)	0	20	7
Woking	2024–25	National League	0	0	—		—		0	0	0	0
Woking	Total		46	18	4	1	—		1	0	51	19
Dagenham & Redbridge (loan)	2024–25	National League	16	1	0	0	—		2 (Note: Appearance(s) in National League Cup)	0	18	1
Hampton & Richmond Borough	2025–26	National League South	36	10	1	1	—		0	0	37	11
Hampton & Richmond Borough	2026–27	National League South	10	0	2	1	—		0	0	12	1
Career total			204	39	11	5	6	0	6	0	227	44
