= Jordan Tunnicliffe =

English footballer

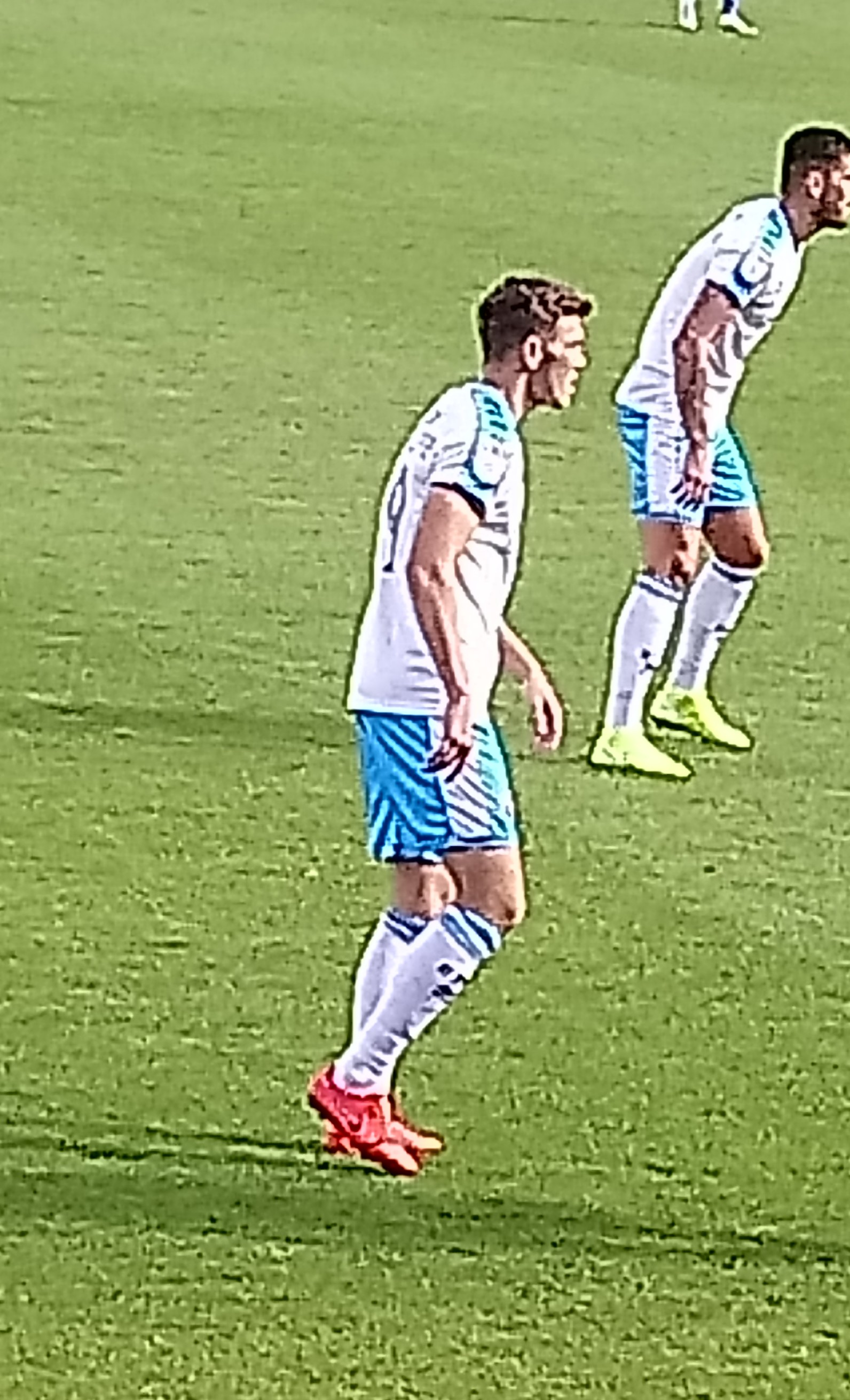
- Tunnicliffe playing for Crawley Town in 2019

Personal information
- Full name: Jordan Rhett Tunnicliffe
- Date of birth: 13 October 1993 (age 33)
- Place of birth: Nuneaton, England
- Height: 6 ft 1 in (1.86 m)
- Position: Defender

Team information
- Current team: Farnborough
- Number: 6

Youth career
- 2004–2012: West Bromwich Albion
- 2012–2013: Nike Academy

Senior career*
Years	Team	Apps	(Gls)
2013–2014	Barnsley	0	(0)
2014	→ Stalybridge Celtic (loan)	1	(0)
2014	Sutton Coldfield Town		
2014–2017	Kidderminster Harriers	67	(1)
2015	→ Hednesford Town (loan)	4	(0)
2016	→ Sutton Coldfield Town (loan)		
2017–2019	AFC Fylde	86	(10)
2019–2022	Crawley Town	94	(5)
2022–2024	Wrexham	33	(2)
2024–2025	Solihull Moors	18	(0)
2025–2026	Kidderminster Harriers	14	(0)
2026–	Farnborough	5	(0)

International career
2017	England C	1	(0)
- * Club domestic league appearances and goals as of 13:46, 5 March 2026 (UTC)

Jordan Rhett Tunnicliffe (born 13 October 1993) is an English professional footballer who plays as a defender for National League South club Farnborough.

== Club career ==
Born in Nuneaton, Tunnicliffe joined West Bromwich Albion's academy in 2004, and signed as a scholar in June 2010. He left the club in 2012, and trialled with West Ham United that summer before joining Nike Academy. He had an unsuccessful trial with Norwich City in April 2013, and joined Barnsley that summer. He joined Stalybridge Celtic on loan in January 2014. He was released by Barnsley at the end of the 2013–14 season.

He joined Sutton Coldfield Town in August 2014.

In November 2014, Tunnicliffe joined Kidderminster Harriers on a deal until the end of the season, with the option to extend his contract by a further season. He joined Hednesford Town on loan until the end of the season in March 2015, but was recalled from his loan the following month. He extended his contract by a further year in May 2015. Following a hamstring injury, he returned to Sutton Coldfield Town on a month-long loan in February 2016. He signed a one-year contract extension at the end of the season. He was awarded their Players' Player of the Season award for the 2016–17 season, but turned down the offer of a new contract at the end of the season.

In the summer of 2017, Tunnicliffe signed for National League side AFC Fylde. Tunnicliffe's debut for the club came on 5 August, as they drew 2–2 at home to Boreham Wood in the opening game of the season. Tunnicliffe scored his first goal of the season on 16 September 2017 with Fylde's second goal of a 2–2 draw with Eastleigh.

On 11 July 2019, Tunnicliffe signed for League Two side Crawley Town in July 2019 on a two-year contract. On 3 August 2019, he made his first appearance for the Reds, playing the full 90 minutes away to Carlisle United. He scored his first goal for Crawley on 1 February 2020: the opening goal of a 3–1 League Two victory over Scunthorpe United. He made 45 appearances across the 2019–20 season and scored 1 goal. Tunnicliffe scored Crawley's final goal of a 3–0 FA Cup third round win over Premier League side Leeds United on 10 January 2021. He was named in the League Two Team of the Year for the 2020–21 season.

On 1 July 2022, it was announced that Tunnicliffe had signed for National League side Wrexham. By 24 August he had only made one substitutes appearance. He was released by Wrexham at the end of the 2023–24 season.

On 6 August 2024, Tunnicliffe signed for National League club Solihull Moors on a one-year deal. He was released at the end of the season.

On 12 June 2025 Tunnicliffe re-signed for National League North club Kidderminster Harriers.

On 17 January 2026, Tunnicliffe joined National League South side, Farnborough on a deal until the end of the 2025–26 campaign following his departure from Kidderminster Harriers. In March 2026 he ruptured his ACL, ruling him out for the season, and had to fundraise for rehabilitation costs.

== International career ==
He was called up the England C team in May 2017, and made his debut as a late substitute against Panjab later that month.

== Personal life ==
His brother James is also a footballer.

== Career statistics ==
As of match played 24 February 2024

Appearances and goals by club, season and competition
Club	Season	League			FA Cup		League Cup		Other		Total	
Club	Season	Division	Apps	Goals	Apps	Goals	Apps	Goals	Apps	Goals	Apps	Goals
Barnsley	2013–14	Championship	0	0	0	0	0	0	0	0	0	0
Stalybridge Celtic (loan)	2013–14	Conference North	1	0	0	0	—		0	0	1	0
Kidderminster Harriers	2014–15	Conference Premier	10	0	0	0	—		0	0	10	0
Kidderminster Harriers	2015–16	National League	15	0	0	0	—		0	0	15	0
Kidderminster Harriers	2016–17	National League North	42	1	2	1	—		5 (Note: 3 appearances and 1 goal in the FA Trophy, 2 appearances in National League North play-offs)	1	49	3
Kidderminster Harriers	Total		67	1	2	1	0	0	5	1	74	3
Hednesford Town (loan)	2014–15	Conference North	4	0	0	0	—		0	0	4	0
AFC Fylde	2017–18	National League	46	6	3	0	—		1 (Note: Appearance(s) in National League play-offs)	0	50	6
AFC Fylde	2018–19	National League	40	4	1	0	—		10 (Note: 7 appearances and 2 goals in FA Trophy, 3 appearances in National League play-offs)	2	51	6
AFC Fylde	Total		86	10	4	0	0	0	11	2	101	12
Crawley Town	2019–20	League Two	37	1	2	0	4	0	2 (Note: Appearance(s) in the EFL Trophy.)	0	45	1
Crawley Town	2020–21	League Two	39	3	4	2	1	0	1	0	45	5
Crawley Town	2021–22	League Two	18	1	0	0	0	0	0	0	18	1
Crawley Town	Total		94	5	6	2	5	0	3	0	108	7
Wrexham	2022–23	National League	25	2	5	0	0	0	1 (Note: Appearance in FA Trophy)	0	31	2
Wrexham	2023–24	League Two	7	0	1	0	0	0	2	0	10	0
Wrexham	Total		32	2	6	0	0	0	3	0	41	2
Career total			284	18	18	3	5	0	22	3	329	24

== Honours ==
Wrexham

- National League: 2022–23
- EFL League Two runner-up: 2023–24

Individual

- EFL League Two Team of the Season: 2020–21
