= Emmanuel Adebowale =

English footballer (born 1997)

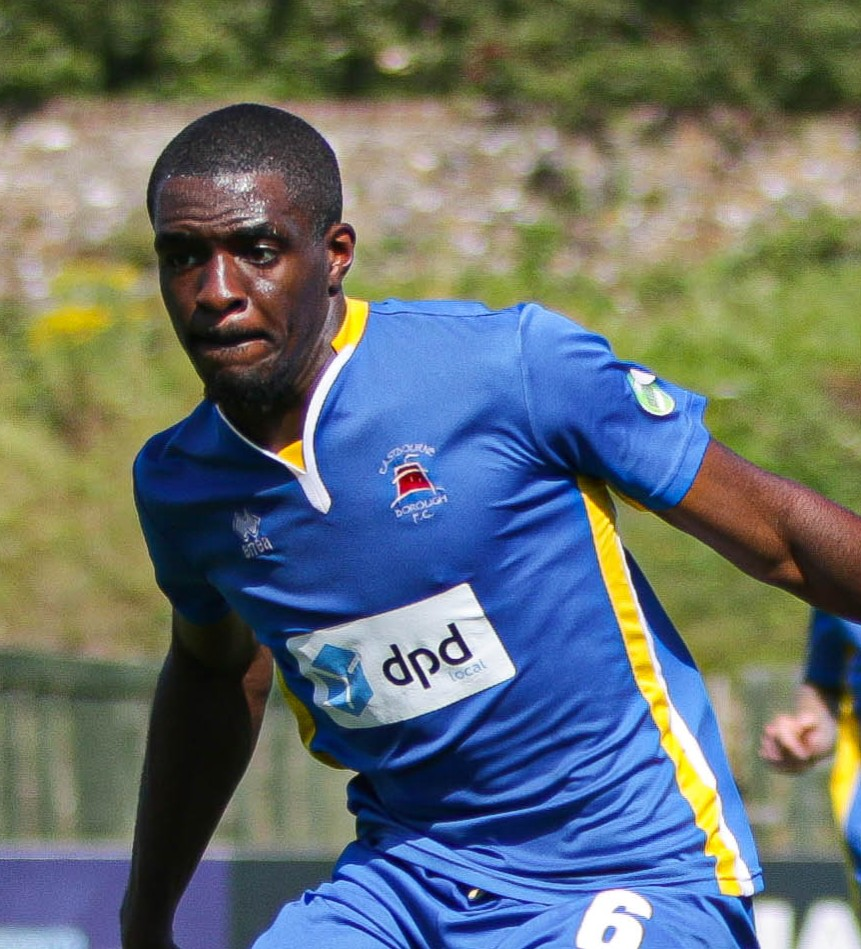
- Adebowale playing for Eastbourne Borough in July 2019

Personal information
- Full name: Emmanuel William Oluwarotimi Adebowale
- Date of birth: 19 September 1997 (age 29)
- Place of birth: Stratford, London, England
- Height: 6 ft 5 in (1.96 m)
- Position: Defender

Youth career
- –2014: West Ham United
- 2014–2016: Sheffield United

Senior career*
Years	Team	Apps	(Gls)
2014–2016	Sheffield United	0	(0)
2015	→ Sheffield (loan)		
2016	→ Goole (loan)		
2016	Hayes & Yeading United	12	(0)
2017	Bishop's Stortford	11	(1)
2017–2019	Dover Athletic	2	(0)
2018	→ Bognor Regis Town (loan)	9	(0)
2018	→ Eastbourne Borough (loan)	5	(0)
2019–2020	Eastbourne Borough	25	(0)
2020–2023	Crawley Town	5	(0)
2021	→ Havant & Waterlooville (loan)	8	(1)
2023–2024	Dartford	8	(0)
2023	→ Bishop's Stortford (loan)	4	(0)
- * Club domestic league appearances and goals as of 17:10, 30 April 2024 (UTC)

Emmanuel William Oluwarotimi Adebowale (born 19 September 1997) is an English professional footballer who plays as a defender. He is a free agent.

Adebowale started his career at West Ham United, before continuing his development at Sheffield United. He has played non-league football for Sheffield, Goole, Hayes & Yeading United, Bishop's Stortford, Dover Athletic, Bognor Regis Town and Eastbourne Borough. In January 2020, he signed a two-and-a-half-year deal with League Two club Crawley Town. He spent the first half of the 2021–22 season on loan at Havant & Waterlooville.

== Career ==
Born in Stratford, Adebowale was part of the youth setup at West Ham United before joining Sheffield United on a two-year scholarship in 2014. During 2015–16 season, he spent time on loan at Sheffield and Goole.

Following his scholarship at Sheffield United, Adebowale joined Hayes & Yeading United in September 2016 before leaving later that season to join Bishop's Stortford.

On 27 July 2017, Adebowale signed for National League side Dover Athletic on a two-year deal. He joined Bognor Regis Town on a one-month loan in January 2018. On 30 November 2018, he joined Eastbourne Borough on a one-month loan. After his contract at Dover expired, Adebowale joined National League South side Eastbourne Borough on 6 June 2019.

On 31 January 2020, Adebowale signed for EFL League Two club Crawley Town for an undisclosed fee. He made his debut for Crawley Town on 8 February 2020, starting in an away game against Salford City – his only Crawley appearance of the 2019–20 season.

On 12 August 2021, he joined National League South club Havant & Waterlooville on a one-year loan deal. He made his debut for the club in a 3–0 league win over Welling United on 15 August 2021, and scored his first goal for the club with a "towering header" in their following game, a 2–1 win away to Hampton & Richmond Borough on 22 August. In January 2022, it was announced that Adebowale had returned to Crawley, having made 8 appearances on loan at Havant.

On 9 February 2023, it was announced that Adebowale had left Crawley Town after agreeing to mutually terminate his contract with the club.

On 23 March 2023, Adebowale joined Dartford until the end of the season.

On 1 July 2023, Adebowale renewed his contract with Dartford for the 2023–24 season.

On 10 November 2023, Adebowale joined Bishop's Stortford on a month-long loan.

On 30 April 2024, it was announced the Adebowale would leave Dartford following the expiration of his contract.

== Career statistics ==
As of 19 March 2024

Appearances and goals by club, season and competition
Club	Season	League			FA Cup		League Cup		Other		Total	
Club	Season	Division	Apps	Goals	Apps	Goals	Apps	Goals	Apps	Goals	Apps	Goals
Sheffield United	2014–15	League One	0	0	0	0	0	0	0	0	0	0
Sheffield United	2015–16	League One	0	0	0	0	0	0	0	0	0	0
Sheffield United	Total		0	0	0	0	0	0	0	0	0	0
Hayes & Yeading United	2016–17	Southern League Premier Division	12	0	0	0	—		2 (Note: One appearance in FA Trophy, one appearance in Southern League Cup)	0	14	0
Bishop's Stortford	2016–17	National League South	11	1	0	0	—		0	0	11	1
Dover Athletic	2017–18	National League	0	0	0	0	—		0	0	0	0
Dover Athletic	2018–19	National League	2	0	1	0	—		0	0	3	0
Dover Athletic	Total		2	0	1	0	—		0	0	3	0
Bognor Regis Town (loan)	2017–18	National League South	9	0	0	0	—		1	0	10	0
Eastbourne Borough (loan)	2018–19	National League South	5	0	0	0	—		1 (Note: Appearance(s) in FA Trophy)	0	6	0
Eastbourne Borough	2019–20	National League South	25	0	2	0	—		5 (Note: Three appearances in FA Trophy, two appearances in Sussex Senior Challenge Cup)	0	32	0
Crawley Town	2019–20	League Two	1	0	0	0	0	0	0	0	1	0
Crawley Town	2020–21	League Two	1	0	1	0	0	0	3 (Note: Appearance(s) in EFL Trophy)	0	5	0
Crawley Town	2021–22	League Two	0	0	0	0	0	0	0	0	0	0
Crawley Town	2022–23	League Two	3	0	0	0	1	0	2 (Note: Appearance(s) in EFL Trophy)	0	5	0
Crawley Town	Total		5	0	1	0	1	0	5	0	12	0
Havant & Waterlooville (loan)	2021–22	National League South	8	1	1	0	—		0	0	9	1
Dartford	2022–23	National League South	1	0	—		—		—		1	0
Dartford	2023–24	National League South	7	0	0	0	—		4 (Note: Two appearances in the London Senior Cup) (Note: Two appearances in the Kent Senior Cup)	1	11	1
Dartford	Total		8	0	0	0	0	0	4	1	12	1
Bishop's Stortford (loan)	2023–24	National League North	4	0	—		—		1 (Note: One appearance in the FA Trophy)	0	5	0
Career total			89	2	5	0	1	0	19	1	114	3
