= Gyliano van Velzen =

Dutch footballer (born 1994)

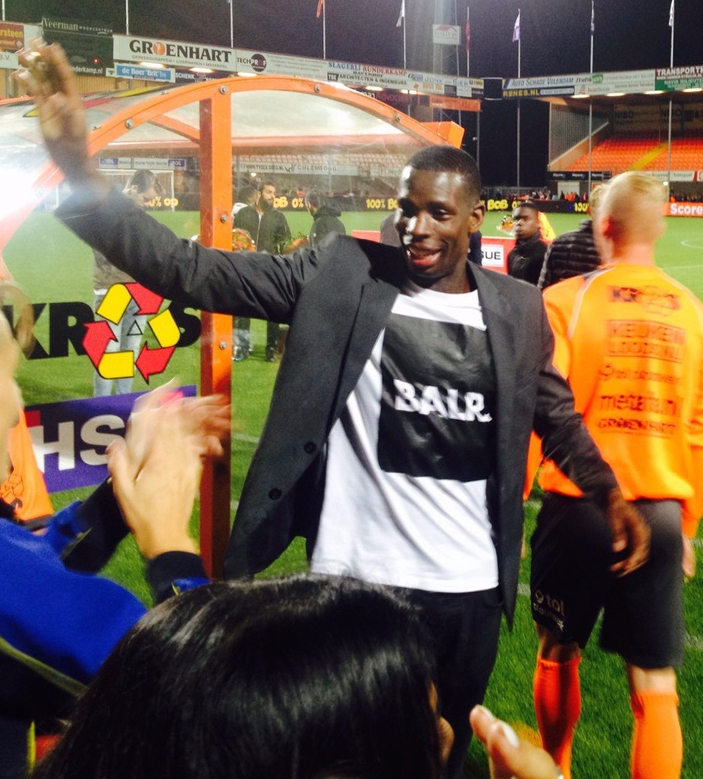
- Van Velzen with Volendam in September 2015

Personal information
- Full name: Gyliano Mauritzio Marvin Jermaine Van Velzen
- Date of birth: 14 April 1994 (age 32)
- Place of birth: Amsterdam, Netherlands
- Height: 1.86 m (6 ft 1 in)
- Position: Winger

Team information
- Current team: VVSB
- Number: 11

Youth career
- 2007–2010: Ajax
- 2010–2012: Manchester United

Senior career*
Years	Team	Apps	(Gls)
2012–2013	Manchester United	0	(0)
2012–2013	→ Royal Antwerp (loan)	12	(1)
2013–2015	Utrecht	7	(0)
2015–2017	Volendam	52	(6)
2017–2019	Roda JC	63	(7)
2019–2020	Crawley Town	4	(0)
2020	→ Aldershot Town (loan)	4	(0)
2020–2022	Telstar	59	(7)
2022–2023	Peyia 2014	25	(3)
2023–	VVSB	64	(22)

International career
2009	Netherlands U15	2	(0)
2009–2010	Netherlands U16	9	(0)
2010–2011	Netherlands U17	9	(0)
2015	Netherlands U21	1	(0)
- * Club domestic league appearances and goals as of 08:05, 20 July 2025 (UTC)

Gyliano Mauritzio Marvin Jermaine Van Velzen (born 14 April 1994) is a Dutch professional footballer who plays as a winger for Derde Divisie club VVSB. Born in Amsterdam, he began his career with Ajax before moving to English club Manchester United as a 16-year-old in 2010. However, he failed to break into the Manchester United first team and after a loan spell with Belgian club Royal Antwerp, he returned to the Netherlands with Utrecht.

== Club career ==
=== Early career ===
Van Velzen began his career at Ajax at the age of 13, coming through the ranks at the club, but was not offered a professional contract.

=== Manchester United ===
In November 2010, he was signed by Manchester United and was placed into the Manchester United reserve team, where he spent two years, before being promoted to the senior squad. In August 2012, Van Velzen signed a professional contract with the club.

==== Loan to Royal Antwerp ====
On 31 August 2012, Van Velzen was loaned out to Royal Antwerp. He made his league debut on 15 September 2012, in a 1–1 home draw against Mouscron-Péruwelz. He scored his first goal in a 2–0 win against Brussels. He returned to Manchester United on 2 January 2013.

=== Utrecht ===
In the summer of 2013, Van Velzen was released by Manchester United. On 6 August 2013, Dutch club FC Utrecht signed him for three seasons. He made his debut on 6 October in a 3–0 league defeat against Ajax.

=== Volendam ===
On 9 June 2015, it was announced that Van Velzen had signed a two-year contract with Eerste Divisie side FC Volendam. He made 52 league appearances for the club, scoring six times. Van Velzen made his league debut for Volendam on 7 August 2015 in a 4–1 away win over NAC Breda. He scored his first goal on 18 September 2015 in a 2–0 away win against Helmond Sport. The goal was the second of the game and came in the 76th minute.

=== Roda JC Kerkrade ===
On 30 January 2017, Van Velzen signed a two-and-a-half-year deal with Eredivisie side Roda JC Kerkrade.

=== Crawley Town ===
On 5 September 2019, Van Velzen signed a two-year deal with EFL League Two side Crawley Town. He joined National League side Aldershot Town on loan on 22 February 2020. On 2 September 2020, Van Velzen left Crawley Town via mutual consent, after one year with the English club.

=== Telstar ===
He signed with Dutch Eerste Divisie side SC Telstar in September 2020 on a two-year contract.

== International career ==
Van Velzen is of Surinamese descent and is eligible to play for the Netherlands or Suriname at international level.

== Career statistics ==
=== Club ===
As of 23 August 2023

Appearances and goals by club, season and competition
Club	Season	League			National Cup		League Cup		Other		Total	
Club	Season	Division	Apps	Goals	Apps	Goals	Apps	Goals	Apps	Goals	Apps	Goals
Manchester United	2012–13	Premier League	0	0	0	0	0	0	0	0	0	0
Royal Antwerp (loan)	2012–13	Belgian First Division B	12	1	0	0	–		0	0	12	1
Utrecht	2013–14	Eredivisie	5	0	0	0	–		0	0	5	0
Utrecht	2014–15	Eredivisie	2	0	0	0	–		0	0	2	0
Utrecht	Total		7	0	0	0	–		0	0	7	0
Volendam	2015–16	Eerste Divisie	30	3	1	0	–		2 (Note: Appearance(s) in Eerste Divisie Playoffs)	0	33	3
Volendam	2016–17	Eerste Divisie	22	3	4	1	–		0	0	26	4
Volendam	Total		52	6	5	1	–		2	0	59	7
Roda JC	2016–17	Eredivisie	12	1	0	0	–		3	1	15	2
Roda JC	2017–18	Eredivisie	22	0	3	0	–		1	0	26	0
Roda JC	2018–19	Eerste Divisie	29	6	1	1	–		0	0	30	7
Roda JC	Total		63	7	4	1	–		4	1	71	9
Crawley Town	2019–20	League Two	4	0	0	0	0	0	1 (Note: Appearance(s) in EFL Trophy)	0	5	0
Aldershot Town (loan)	2019–20	National League	4	0	0	0	0	0	0	0	4	0
Telstar	2020–21	Eerste Divisie	29	5	1	0	–		0	0	30	5
Telstar	2021–22	Eerste Divisie	30	2	3	1	–		0	0	33	3
Telstar	Total		59	7	4	1	–		0	0	63	8
Career total			201	21	13	3	0	0	7	1	221	25

=== International ===
As of 2 January 2020

Appearances and goals by national team and year
National team	Year	Apps	Goals
Netherlands U17	2010	2	0
Netherlands U17	2011	4	0
Netherlands U21	2015	1	0
Total		7	0
