= Denzeil Boadu =

English footballer (born 1997)

Personal information
- Full name: Denzeil Boadu-Adjei
- Date of birth: 20 February 1997 (age 29)
- Place of birth: London, England
- Height: 1.81 m (5 ft 11 in)
- Position: Striker

Youth career
- Tottenham Hotspur
- 2012–2013: Arsenal
- 2013–2017: Manchester City

Senior career*
Years	Team	Apps	(Gls)
2017–2019	Borussia Dortmund II	29	(0)
2019–2020	Crawley Town	0	(0)
Total		29	(0)

International career
- England U16
- England U17
- * Club domestic league appearances and goals

Denzeil Boadu-Adjei (born 20 February 1997) is an English former professional footballer who played as a striker.

== Early and personal life ==
Born in London, Boadu attended Central Foundation Boys' School in Islington. He is of Ghanaian descent.

== Career ==
Boadu spent time with the youth teams of Tottenham Hotspur, Arsenal and Manchester City before joining German club Borussia Dortmund II in 2017. During his time with Manchester City he spent 20 months injured.

After spending the pre-season for the 2019–20 season on trial with Reading, Boadu joined Crawley Town in September 2019. After four appearances he left the club by mutual consent in January 2020. He did not play professionally after that.

== International career ==
Boadu has represented England at under-16 and under-17 level.
