= Gabriele Cioffi =

Italian footballer (born 1975)

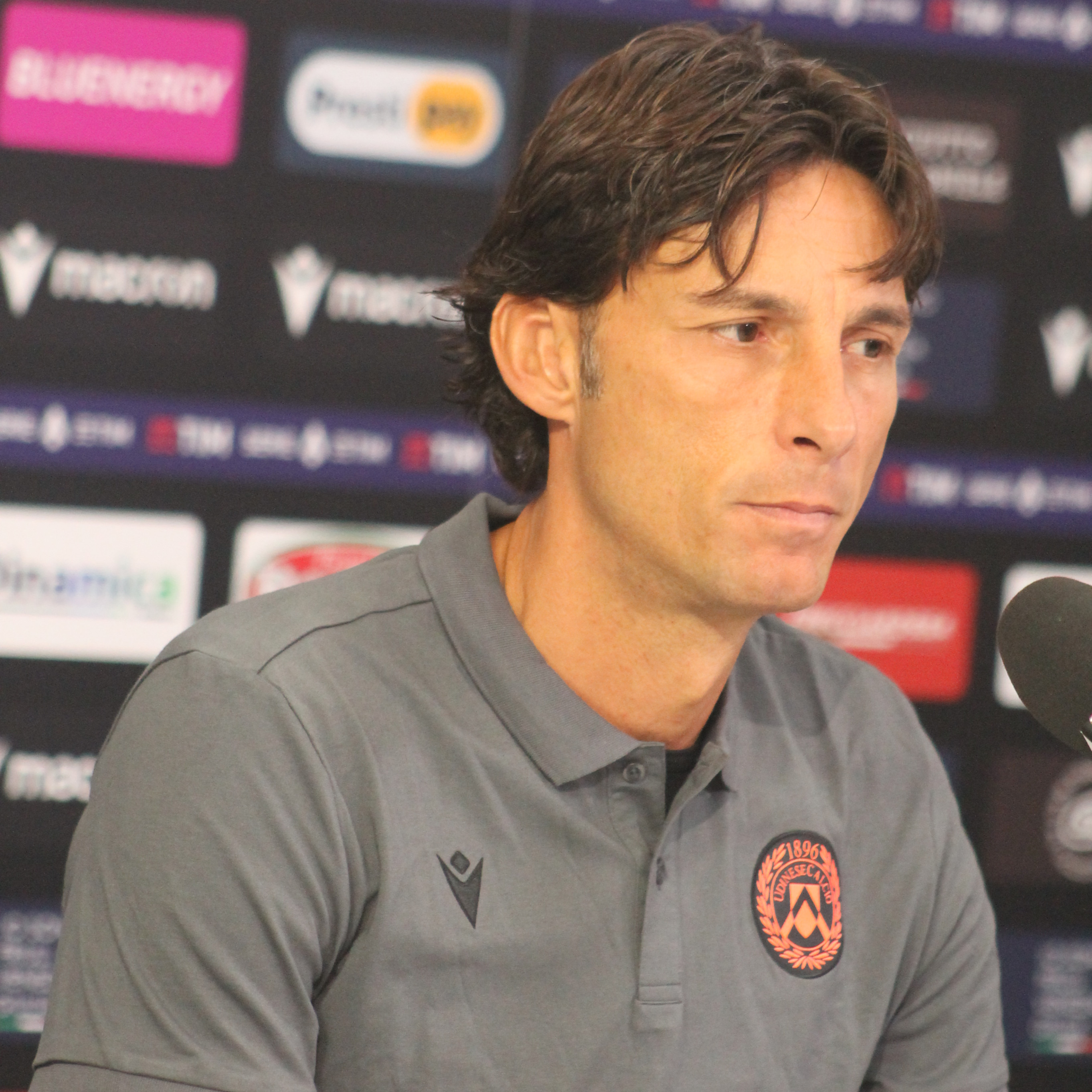
- Cioffi in 2023

Personal information
- Date of birth: 7 September 1975 (age 51)
- Place of birth: Florence, Italy
- Height: 1.96 m (6 ft 5 in)
- Position: Defender

Youth career
- Sestese

Senior career*
Years	Team	Apps	(Gls)
1992–1996	Sestese	77	(2)
1996–1997	Marsala	12	(2)
1996–1997	Poggibonsi	10	(0)
1997–1999	Spezia	55	(1)
1999–2001	Arezzo	19	(0)
2001–2002	Taranto	4	(0)
2002–2005	Novara	72	(7)
2005–2006	Mantova	52	(5)
2006–2007	Torino	18	(1)
2007–2009	Ascoli	39	(3)
2010	AlbinoLeffe	18	(1)
2010–2012	Carpi	52	(6)
Total		428	(30)

Managerial career
- 2013: Gavorrano
- 2018–2019: Crawley Town
- 2021–2022: Udinese
- 2022: Hellas Verona
- 2023–2024: Udinese
- 2026: Carrarese
- * Club domestic league appearances and goals

Gabriele Cioffi (born 7 September 1975) is an Italian professional football manager and former player who played as a defender.

== Playing career ==
As a player, Cioffi was a defender. He started his career with Tuscan amateurs Sestese, which was followed by several other experience in the minor Italian leagues of Serie C1 and Serie C2. In January 2005 he joined Mantova, with whom he became a fan favourite, won a Serie C1 title and made his Serie B debut during the 2005–06 season. After an impressive Serie B campaign with Mantova, he was subsequently signed by Torino, with whom he made his Serie A debut during the 2006–07 season.

He left Torino after one season to join Ascoli, which he left in 2010 for AlbinoLeffe as a free agent. He retired in 2012 after two seasons with Carpi where he won the league as captain getting the promotion from Lega Pro 2 to Lega Pro 1. In his last season with the club, he lost the final for promotion to Serie B.

== Managerial career ==
=== Early years ===
After his retirement, he stayed in Carpi as an assistant coach for the 2012–13 season. In July 2013, he was announced as the new head coach of Lega Pro Seconda Divisione club Gavorrano; he was fired later in November and following his departure the squad had a poor run of results. It was widely understood that the club called him back with a few games remaining in the season, and relegation being a formality, although Gabriele refused to return.

He subsequently relocated to Australia and worked for two years as youth coach for Eastern United, before moving back to Italy in November 2015 to accept an offer as youth coach for the Berretti team of third division club Südtirol. He left the club in February 2016 to join Henk Ten Cate's coaching staff as assistant head coach at Al Jazira.

After being an integral part of leading Al-Jazira to the President's Cup in 2016, and steering the club into returning to the Asian Champions League, Gabriele was headhunted in December 2016 and he joined the coaching staff of Gianfranco Zola at English Championship club Birmingham City. Following Zola's resignation on 17 April 2017, his entire backroom staff, including Cioffi, left Birmingham too.

In October 2017, he signed as assistant manager for Al Dhafra, fighting relegation at the time. His first match on the touchline was against his previous team, Al Jazira. The team, thanks to his work, was able to achieve safety from relegation, and to have a stable position in the table.

=== Crawley Town ===
He had been widely accredited as being instrumental as an assistant at his previous clubs, and having been earmarked and interviewed for several clubs after leaving Al Dhafra, the opportunity finally arose for him to take on a role as head coach. In September 2018, he was named as new head coach of EFL League Two club Crawley Town, succeeding Harry Kewell.

Cioffi achieved the objective laid out for him comfortably, saving the club from relegation with several games of the season left, and was confirmed for a second season, during which Cioffi took on two historic cup runs, the first being the club reaching the fourth round of the League Cup for the first time, and beating Premier League opposition for the first time in the process, as well as reaching the second round of the FA Cup for the first time in nearly a decade. At the same time, several unfortunate injuries to key players led to a run where the club struggled to score and win despite creating chances. His players supported Cioffi after the loss to League One team Fleetwood Town in the FA Cup, but, despite this, Cioffi and Crawley Town parted ways by mutual consent shortly thereafter. He was succeeded by John Yems.

=== Udinese ===
In September 2020, he joined Serie A club Udinese as an assistant coach to manager Luca Gotti. Cioffi settled in quickly at Udinese and when Gotti was beset with COVID-19, Cioffi was placed in interim charge, including a famous away victory at Lazio. Although some media outlets strongly credited him with the plan for the victory, Cioffi humbly deferred to, and dedicated the victory to his boss. On 7 December 2021, following Gotti's sacking at Udinese, Cioffi became the caretaker head coach for the team. Under his tenure, Cioffi managed to guide Udinese out of the relegation zone, ending the season in twelfth place with 47 points; despite this, on 23 May 2022, one day after the final matchday of the season (a 4–0 away win at Salernitana), Udinese announced they would not extend Cioffi's contract with the club, due to expire on 30 June 2022.

=== Hellas Verona ===
In June 2022, Cioffi signed as manager for Serie A club Hellas Verona with a contract lasting until 2024. On 11 October 2022, Cioffi was dismissed from his job after achieving only five points in the first nine games of the Serie A season.

=== Second stint at Udinese ===
On 25 October 2023, Udinese announced the appointment of Cioffi in charge of the first team, following the dismissal of Andrea Sottil, on a contract until the end of the season with an option to extend it for one further year. He was dismissed on 22 April 2024, leaving Udinese just above the relegation zone.

=== Carrarese ===
After two years away from managing, on 15 June 2026 Cioffi was appointed as the new head coach of Serie B club Carrarese signing a one year contract with an option for a further year. He was dismissed by the club on 29 September 2026 after Carrarese started the season with 1 point in 5 games.

== Managerial statistics ==
As of match played 19 September 2026

Managerial record by team and tenure
Team	From	To	Record							
Team	From	To	G	W	D	L	GF	GA	GD	Win %
Gavorrano	6 July 2013	4 November 2013	13	2	5	6	12	19	−7	15.38
Crawley Town	7 September 2018	2 December 2019	72	21	15	36	85	115	−30	29.17
Udinese	7 December 2021	30 June 2022	24	9	7	8	44	32	+12	37.50
Hellas Verona	1 July 2022	11 October 2022	10	1	2	7	9	21	−12	10.00
Udinese	25 October 2023	22 April 2024	25	4	10	11	27	38	−11	16.00
Carrarese	1 July 2026	present	6	0	1	5	2	7	−5	0.00
Total			150	37	40	73	179	232	−53	24.67
