= 2020–21 Brighton & Hove Albion F.C. season =

119th season in existence of Brighton & Hove Albion

Brighton & Hove Albion
2020–21 season
- Chairman: Tony Bloom
- Head coach: Graham Potter
- Stadium: Falmer Stadium
- Premier League: 16th
- FA Cup: Fifth round
- EFL Cup: Fourth round
- Top goalscorer: League: Neal Maupay (8); All: Neal Maupay (8)
- Biggest win: 4–0 vs Portsmouth (EFL Cup – 17 September)
- Biggest defeat: 0–3 vs Manchester United (EFL Cup – 30 September); 0–3 vs Leicester City (Premier League – 13 December)
Home colours	Away colours	Third colours

The 2020–21 season was Brighton & Hove Albion's 119th year in existence and their fourth consecutive season in the Premier League. Along with competing in the domestic league, the club also participated in the FA Cup and EFL Cup. The season covered the period from 27 July 2020 to 30 June 2021.

== Summary ==
The Seagulls had only two pre-season matches for the 2020–21 campaign due the late season start as the result of the previous season being delayed due to COVID-19. Brighton played out two home draws, 1–1 against Chelsea with Pascal Groß scoring a 90th-minute equaliser from the spot - with 2,500 fans attending for a government trial for fans return to football - and a 0–0 with West Brom.

Brighton's opening game of the season was at home to Chelsea on Monday 14 September 2020. The game finished in a 3–1 defeat for The Seagulls. Ben White made his first league appearance for Brighton and Adam Lallana made his debut in this game. Brighton's first win came in their second game, a 4–0 victory over Portsmouth in the EFL Cup on the 17 September where Alexis Mac Allister, Bernardo and Viktor Gyökeres all scored their first Albion goals. The Seagulls first league victory came in their second Premier League match, a 3–0 away win over Newcastle on 20 September in a game where Yves Bissouma received his first red card for the club. On 26 September, Bruno Fernandes scored a penalty for Manchester United after the final whistle due to VAR giving handball on Neal Maupay right at the end. The converted penalty gave United the 3 points, winning 3–2. 4 days later Brigton again lost to United this time a 3–0 home loss in the EFL Cup missing out on a quarter final place. Brighton claimed their first ever Premier League points against the defending champions Liverpool in a 1–1 home draw on 28 November, where Pascal Groß scored a 93rd-minute penalty to equalise, their second penalty of the game following Neal Maupay failing to convert the first awarded in the 20th minute.

On 10 January 2021, Brighton struggled against in form League Two side Newport County in their FA Cup third round side in which they scrapped a penalty shootout win away from home, in a match where Percy Tau eventually made his debut, 905 days after signing for the club. Neal Maupay's strike away at Leeds United on 16 January was enough to end The Albion's record of 9 game winless run in the top flight – 10 including their FA Cup fixture – taking all three points to the south coast.

Brighton's first home league win of the season came on their 11th match, keeping a clean sheet in a 1–0 win over Tottenham Hotspur on 31 January with Leandro Trossard netting the goal. This was their first home win in the league since 20 June 2020, a 2–1 victory over Arsenal. 3 days after the victory over Spurs, The Seagulls beat defending champions Liverpool at Anfield, their first League win at Liverpool since 1982 with Steven Alzate's first ever Premier League goal being the only goal of the game.

Brighton were smashed out of the FA Cup in the 94th minute with a headed goal for Kelechi Iheanacho in the 1–0 away loss at Leicester City on 10 February. Potter handed debuts to Poles, Jakub Moder and Michał Karbownik in the fifth round defeat.

On 22 February, Christian Benteke scored a 95th-minute winner to claim all 3 points against their biggest rivals taking Crystal Palace to 13th in the table after the 2–1 victory in Sussex. Joël Veltman scored his first goal for The Seagulls in the game. 5 days later, a controversial 1–0 defeat away at West Brom followed, Lewis Dunk had a goal ruled out by referee Lee Mason, causing strong criticism of Mason in the media and on Sky Sports, after blowing his whistle allowing a quick free-kick to be taken, however Mason then blew his whistle again after the free kick had been taken, denying Dunk the goal. Meanwhile, Pascal Groß and Danny Welbeck both missed from the penalty spot in the bizarre defeat at The Hawthorns.

On 20 March, Brighton matched their away meeting with Newcastle again beating The Magpies 3–0, going six points clear of the bottom three. On 20 April, Brighton earnt their first ever point at Stamford Bridge keeping a clean sheet in the 0–0 draw with Chelsea on a night The Blues withdrew from the controversial plans of the European Super League. Albion's Ben White was sent off in the 90+2 minute for a second bookable offense after putting in a strong performance throughout the game. 4 days later, Brighton lost to already relegated Sheffield United 1–0 at Bramall Lane with David McGoldrick scoring the only goal of the game. José Izquierdo came on as a substitute in his first first team appearance in 2–and–a–half years after being out with injuries.

On 9 May, in a 2–1 away loss at Wolves, Brighton had two players sent off. Lewis Dunk being dismissed first for pulling back Fábio Silva who was darting for goal, with Neal Maupay being shown red after confronting the referee, Jonathan Moss after the final whistle. A day later, Brighton's Premier League status was confirmed for a fifth consecutive season as a result of Burnley beaten Fulham 2–0 at Craven Cottage. The result actually knocked The Seagulls a place down to 16th on the night. On 18 May, in front of a reduced returning fan base, Brighton came from two goals down to beat this year's Premier League champions Manchester City. Their first win over the Cityzens since 1989. This was also Albion's first Premier League victory without captain Lewis Dunk, who was out suspended with Pascal Groß deputising in a game where Dan Burn – who scored the winner – scored his first Albion goal, and his first goal in over three years.

Brighton finished the season with a 2–0 away defeat at Arsenal and finishing the season in 16th place, equalling their best ever points tally of 41 points which was also achieved the season before. Brighton recorded their most goals scored in a Premier League season, scoring 40 and conceded 46, the fewest they have conceded. Their –6 goal difference is the best they achieved since being in the Premier League, with 12 clean sheets also being a club record.

It was a successful summer for Brighton with several players being called up by their countries for the delayed UEFA Euro 2020 tournament, taken place in the summer of 2021 due to the COVID-19 pandemic. Leandro Trossard for Belgium, Robert Sánchez for Spain, Joël Veltman for the Netherlands and Jakub Moder for Poland all in their respective national squads for the championships. Ben White who gained his first international call-up with England was named in their 33-man provisional squad but was later one of seven players cut. Andi Zeqiri was also called up for the first time by his national side Switzerland, being named in the 29-man provisional squad, but like White, was cut from the squad. However, White made his national debut in the first warm up match against Austria where he came on as a substitute in the 1–0 victory at the Riverside Stadium where he blocked a shot on the line in the final stages. He became the fifth Brighton player to play for England, and the second in just under three years after captain Lewis Dunk won a cap in November 2018. In the second and final warm up match he made his first international start, playing the whole match in the 1–0 win over Romania again being played at the Riverside Stadium. A day later, on 7 June, he was called up to the 26-man squad to replace the injured Trent Alexander-Arnold who picked up an injury against Austria.

== Players ==
=== First-team squad ===
As of 1 February 2021

Note: Flags indicate national team as defined under FIFA eligibility rules; some limited exceptions apply. Players may hold more than one non-FIFA nationality.

No.	Pos.	Nation	Player
2	DF	ENG	Tariq Lamptey
3	DF	ENG	Ben White
4	DF	ENG	Adam Webster (vice-captain)
5	DF	ENG	Lewis Dunk (captain)
6	DF	POL	Michał Karbownik
7	FW	IRL	Aaron Connolly
8	MF	MLI	Yves Bissouma
9	FW	FRA	Neal Maupay
10	MF	ARG	Alexis Mac Allister
11	MF	BEL	Leandro Trossard
13	MF	GER	Pascal Groß
14	MF	ENG	Adam Lallana
15	MF	POL	Jakub Moder
16	MF	IRI	Alireza Jahanbakhsh

No.	Pos.	Nation	Player
17	MF	COL	Steven Alzate
18	FW	ENG	Danny Welbeck
19	MF	COL	José Izquierdo
20	DF	ENG	Solly March
21	FW	ROU	Florin Andone
22	FW	RSA	Percy Tau
23	GK	ENG	Jason Steele
24	MF	NED	Davy Pröpper
25	MF	ECU	Moisés Caicedo
26	GK	ESP	Robert Sánchez
29	FW	SUI	Andi Zeqiri
31	GK	ENG	Christian Walton
33	DF	ENG	Dan Burn
34	DF	NED	Joël Veltman

=== Under 23s and academy ===
As of 3 February 2021
Players to have featured in a first-team matchday squad this season.

Note: Flags indicate national team as defined under FIFA eligibility rules; some limited exceptions apply. Players may hold more than one non-FIFA nationality.

No.	Pos.	Nation	Player
44	MF	SWE	Peter Gwargis
47	MF	ENG	Teddy Jenks
52	DF	FRA	Romaric Yapi
53	DF	BEL	Lars Dendoncker

No.	Pos.	Nation	Player
61	GK	ENG	Tom McGill
54	MF	ENG	Jensen Weir
67	MF	GER	Reda Khadra

== Transfers ==
=== Transfers in ===
Date	Position	Nationality	Name	From	Fee	Ref.
1 July 2020	DM	(France)	Samy Chouchane	(France) Boulogne-Billancourt	Undisclosed	
1 July 2020	CM	(Australia)	Cameron Peupion	(Australia) Sydney FC	Undisclosed	
9 July 2020	CB	(Republic of Ireland)	Leigh Kavanagh	(Republic of Ireland) Bray Wanderers	Free transfer	
9 July 2020	MF	(Republic of Ireland)	Andrew Moran	(Republic of Ireland) Bray Wanderers	Free transfer	
15 July 2020	FW	(England)	Zak Emmerson	(England) Oldham Athletic	Undisclosed	
16 July 2020	RB	(Sweden)	Casper Nilsson	(Sweden) Malmö FF	Undisclosed	
23 July 2020	CM	(England)	Jensen Weir	(England) Wigan Athletic	£500,000	
27 July 2020	CM	(England)	Adam Lallana	(England) Liverpool	Free transfer	
29 July 2020	RB	(Netherlands)	Joël Veltman	(Netherlands) Ajax	£900,000	
7 August 2020	CB	(Belgium)	Lars Dendoncker	(Belgium) Club Brugge	Free transfer	
15 August 2020	CB	(England)	Ben Jackson	(England) Watford	Free transfer	
9 September 2020	FW	(Gabon)	Ulrick Eneme Ella	(France) Amiens	Undisclosed	
10 September 2020	CB	(Netherlands)	Jan Paul van Hecke	(Netherlands) NAC Breda	Undisclosed	
1 October 2020	AM	(Germany)	Reda Khadra	(Germany) Borussia Dortmund	Undisclosed	
1 October 2020	FW	(Switzerland)	Andi Zeqiri	(Switzerland) Lausanne	Undisclosed	
6 October 2020	LB	(Poland)	Michał Karbownik	(Poland) Legia Warsaw	Undisclosed	
6 October 2020	CM	(Poland)	Jakub Moder	(Poland) Lech Poznań	Undisclosed	
18 October 2020	FW	(England)	Danny Welbeck	(England) Watford	Free transfer	
9 January 2021	FW	(Republic of Ireland)	Evan Ferguson	(Republic of Ireland) Bohemians	Undisclosed	
1 February 2021	CM	(Ecuador)	Moisés Caicedo	(Ecuador) Independiente del Valle	Undisclosed	

=== Loans in ===
Date from	Position	Nationality	Name	From	Date until	Ref.
1 February 2021	CB	(England)	Jack Wakely	(England) Chelsea U23s	End of season	

=== Loans out ===
Date from	Position	Nationality	Name	To	Date until	Ref.
5 August 2020	CF	(South Africa)	Percy Tau	(Belgium) Anderlecht	7 January 2021	
14 August 2020	CF	(Slovenia)	Jan Mlakar	(Slovenia) Maribor	End of season	
21 August 2020	CB	(Republic of Ireland)	Warren O'Hora	(England) Milton Keynes Dons	18 January 2021	
25 August 2020	CM	(England)	Taylor Richards	(England) Doncaster Rovers	End of season	
26 August 2020	CB	(England)	Matt Clarke	(England) Derby County	End of season	
26 August 2020	CM	(England)	Ryan Longman	(England) AFC Wimbledon	End of season	
27 August 2020	CB	(Norway)	Leo Skiri Østigård	(England) Coventry City	End of season	
1 September 2020	CF	(England)	Glenn Murray	(England) Watford	30 January 2021	
2 September 2020	CB	(Republic of Ireland)	Shane Duffy	(Scotland) Celtic	6 May 2021	
2 September 2020	GK	(England)	Tom McGill	(England) Crawley Town	12 January 2021	
15 September 2020	GK	(England)	Roco Rees	(England) Worthing	End of season	
17 September 2020	CB	(Netherlands)	Jan Paul van Hecke	(Netherlands) SC Heerenveen	End of season	
26 September 2020	GK	(England)	Toby Bull	(England) Worthing	30 September 2020	
2 October 2020	CF	(Sweden)	Viktor Gyökeres	(Wales) Swansea City	14 January 2021	
5 October 2020	LB	(England)	Alex Cochrane	(Belgium) Union SG	End of season	
6 October 2020	CB	(Romania)	Tudor Băluță	(Ukraine) Dynamo Kyiv	End of season	
6 October 2020	LB	(Poland)	Michał Karbownik	(Poland) Legia Warsaw	17 January 2021	
6 October 2020	CM	(Poland)	Jakub Moder	(Poland) Lech Poznań	31 December 2020	
16 October 2020	CB	(England)	Haydon Roberts	(England) Rochdale	End of season	
5 January 2021	CM	(Republic of Ireland)	Jayson Molumby	(England) Preston North End	End of season	
15 January 2021	CF	(Sweden)	Viktor Gyökeres	(England) Coventry City	End of season	
19 January 2021	LB	(Brazil)	Bernardo	(Austria) Red Bull Salzburg	End of season	
22 January 2021	GK	(Australia)	Mathew Ryan	(England) Arsenal	End of season	

=== Transfers out ===
Date	Position	Nationality	Name	To	Fee	Ref.
1 July 2020	CB	(England)	Luca Cocoracchio	(England) Worthing	Released	
1 July 2020	RB	(England)	Archie Davies	(England) Crawley Town	Released	
1 July 2020	CM	(Wales)	Jordan Davies	(Wales) Wrexham	Released	
1 July 2020	CB	(England)	Ben Clark-Eden	(England) Pagham	Released	
1 July 2020	LB	(England)	Lewis Freestone	(England) Cheltenham Town	Released	
1 July 2020	GK	(Finland)	Hugo Keto	(Finland) HJK	Released	
1 July 2020	CB	(Poland)	Kacper Łopata	(England) Sheffield United	Released	
1 July 2020	CF	(Serbia)	Bojan Radulovic	(Sweden) AIK	Released	
6 July 2020	LB	(England)	George Cox	(Netherlands) Fortuna Sittard	£45,000	
8 July 2020	RW	(France)	Anthony Knockaert	(England) Fulham	£15,000,000	
18 July 2020	RB	(Italy)	Ezequiel Schelotto	(Argentina) Racing	Released	
22 July 2020	CM	(Israel)	Beram Kayal	(Israel) Bnei Sakhnin	Released	
25 August 2020	RB	(Spain)	Martín Montoya	(Spain) Real Betis	Undisclosed	
1 September 2020	CM	(Australia)	Aaron Mooy	(China) Shanghai SIPG	£4,000,000	
5 September 2020	GK	(England)	David Button	(England) West Bromwich Albion	£500,000	
24 September 2020	CM	(England)	Dale Stephens	(England) Burnley	Undisclosed	
18 January 2021	CB	(Republic of Ireland)	Warren O'Hora	(England) Milton Keynes Dons	Undisclosed	
1 February 2021	CF	(England)	Glenn Murray	(England) Nottingham Forest	Free transfer	
1 February 2021	CM	(England)	Max Sanders	(England) Lincoln City	Undisclosed	

== Pre–season friendlies ==
Win Draw Loss Fixtures

29 August 2020 Friendly	Brighton & Hove Albion	1–1	Chelsea	Falmer
15:00 BST	Groß 90' (pen.)	Report	Werner 4'; Alonso (yellow card) 34'	Stadium: Falmer Stadium; Attendance: 2,524; Referee: Stuart Attwell (England)

5 September 2020 Friendly	Brighton & Hove Albion	0–0	West Bromwich Albion	Falmer
14:00 BST		Report		Stadium: Falmer Stadium; Attendance: 0

== Competitions ==
=== Premier League ===
==== League table ====
Pos	Team	Pld	W	D	L	GF	GA	GD	Pts	Qualification or relegation
14	Crystal Palace	38	12	8	18	41	66	−25	44	
15	Southampton	38	12	7	19	47	68	−21	43	
16	Brighton & Hove Albion	38	9	14	15	40	46	−6	41	
17	Burnley	38	10	9	19	33	55	−22	39	
18	Fulham (R)	38	5	13	20	27	53	−26	28	Relegation to EFL Championship

Source: Premier League
Rules for classification: 1) Points; 2) Goal difference; 3) Goals scored; 4) If the champions, relegated teams or qualified teams for UEFA competitions cannot be determined by rules 1 to 3, rules 4.1 to 4.3 are applied – 4.1) Points gained in head-to-head record between such teams; 4.2) Away goals scored in head-to-head record between such teams; 4.3) Play-offs
(R) Relegated

==== Results summary ====
Overall								Home						Away					
Pld	W	D	L	GF	GA	GD	Pts	W	D	L	GF	GA	GD	W	D	L	GF	GA	GD
38	9	14	15	40	46	−6	41	4	9	6	22	22	0	5	5	9	18	24	−6

Last updated: 23 May 2021.
Source: Premier League

==== Results by matchday ====
Matchday	1	2	3	4	5	6	7	8	9	10	11	12	13	14	15	16	17	18	19	20	21	22	23	24	25	26	27	28	29	30	31	32	33	34	35	36	37	38
Ground	H	A	H	A	A	H	A	H	A	H	H	A	A	H	A	H	H	A	A	H	H	A	A	H	H	A	H	A	H	A	H	A	A	H	A	H	H	A
Result	L	W	L	L	D	D	L	D	W	D	L	L	D	D	D	L	D	L	W	D	W	W	D	D	L	L	L	W	W	L	D	D	L	W	L	D	W	L
Position	16	8	12	16	16	16	16	16	16	16	16	16	16	17	16	17	17	17	16	17	17	15	15	16	16	16	17	16	16	16	15	16	17	14	17	17	16	16

Updated to match(es) played on 23 May 2021. Source: Statto.com
A = Away; H = Home; W = Win; D = Draw; L = Loss

==== Matches ====
The 2020–21 season fixtures were released on 20 August.

14 September 2020 1	Brighton & Hove Albion	1–3	Chelsea	Falmer
20:15 BST	Trossard 54'; Lamptey (yellow card) 81'	Report	Jorginho 23' (pen.); James 56'; Zouma 66'	Stadium: Falmer Stadium; Attendance: 0 Referee: Craig Pawson
Note: Live on Sky Sports

20 September 2020 2	Newcastle United	0–3	Brighton & Hove Albion	Newcastle upon Tyne
14:00 BST	Shelvey (yellow card) 12'; Lewis (yellow card) 25'; Lascelles (yellow card) 34'	Report	Maupay 4' (pen.), 7'; Connolly 83'; Bissouma (red card) 87'	Stadium: St James' Park; Attendance: 0 Referee: Kevin Friend
Note: Live on Sky Sports

26 September 2020 3	Brighton & Hove Albion	2–3	Manchester United	Falmer
12:30 BST	Maupay 40' (pen.); Trossard (yellow card) 42'; White (yellow card) 74'; Dunk (yellow card) 83'; March 90+5'; Jahanbakhsh (yellow card) 90+8'	Report	Fernandes (yellow card) 22', (goal) 90+10' (pen.); Matić (yellow card) 41'; Dunk 43' (o.g.); Rashford 55'	Stadium: Falmer Stadium; Attendance: 0 Referee: Chris Kavanagh
Note: Live on BT Sport

3 October 2020 4	Everton	4–2	Brighton & Hove Albion	Walton
15:00 BST	Calvert-Lewin 16'; Mina 45+2'; Rodríguez 52', 70'	Report	Alzate (yellow card) 4'; Maupay 41'; Bissouma 90+2'	Stadium: Goodison Park; Attendance: 0 Referee: Simon Hooper
Note: Live on BT Sport

18 October 2020 5	Crystal Palace	1–1	Brighton & Hove Albion	Selhurst
14:00 BST	Zaha 19' (pen.); Mitchell (yellow card) 63'; Guaita (yellow card) 76'; McArthur (yellow card) 87'	Report	Ryan (yellow card) 18'; Bissouma (yellow card) 43'; Mac Allister 90'; Dunk (red card) 90+4'	Stadium: Selhurst Park; Attendance: 0 Referee: Stuart Attwell
Note: Live on Sky Sports

26 October 2020 6	Brighton & Hove Albion	1–1	West Bromwich Albion	Falmer
17:30 GMT	Livermore 40' (o.g.); Lamptey (yellow card) 42'; Webster (yellow card) 77'	Report	Grant 83'	Stadium: Falmer Stadium; Attendance: 0 Referee: Jonathan Moss
Note: Live on Sky Sports Box Office

1 November 2020 7	Tottenham Hotspur	2–1	Brighton & Hove Albion	Tottenham
19:15 GMT	Ndombele (yellow card) 7'; Kane 13' (pen.); Reguilón (yellow card) 39'; Bale 73'	Report	Burn (yellow card) 45+4'; Lamptey 56'	Stadium: Tottenham Hotspur Stadium; Attendance: 0 Referee: Graham Scott
Note: Live on Sky Sports Box Office

6 November 2020 8	Brighton & Hove Albion	0–0	Burnley	Falmer
17:30 GMT	Bissouma (yellow card) 87'	Report		Stadium: Falmer Stadium; Attendance: 0 Referee: Mike Dean
Note: Live on Sky Sports Box Office

21 November 2020 9	Aston Villa	1–2	Brighton & Hove Albion	Aston
15:00 GMT	Targett (yellow card) 44'; Konsa 47'; Grealish (yellow card) 90+1'	Report	Welbeck 12'; March 56'; Bissouma (yellow card) 69'; Lamptey (yellow card) 88' (yellow-red card) 90+1'	Stadium: Villa Park; Attendance: 0 Referee: Michael Oliver
Note: Live on BT Sport

28 November 2020 10	Brighton & Hove Albion	1–1	Liverpool	Falmer
12:30 GMT	Maupay (penalty missed) 20'; Veltman (yellow card) 45+1'; White (yellow card) 83'; Groß 90+2' (pen.)	Report	Jota 60'; Alisson (yellow card) 90+3'	Stadium: Falmer Stadium; Attendance: 0 Referee: Stuart Attwell
Note: Live on BT Sport

7 December 2020 11	Brighton & Hove Albion	1–2	Southampton	Falmer
20:00 GMT	Groß 26' (pen.), (yellow card) 80'; Dunk (yellow card) 56'; Bissouma (yellow card) 89'	Report	Djenepo (yellow card) 13'; Vestergaard 45'; Romeu (yellow card) 47'; Ings 81' (pen.); McCarthy (yellow card) 87'	Stadium: Falmer Stadium; Attendance: 2,000; Referee: David Coote
Note: Live on Sky Sports

13 December 2020 12	Leicester City	3–0	Brighton & Hove Albion	Leicester
19:15 GMT	Fuchs (yellow card) 22'; Maddison 27', 44'; Vardy 41'; Evans (yellow card) 78'	Report	Burn (yellow card) 72'	Stadium: King Power Stadium; Attendance: 0 Referee: Martin Atkinson
Note: Live on Amazon Prime Sport

16 December 2020 13	Fulham	0–0	Brighton & Hove Albion	Fulham
20:00 GMT	Robinson (yellow card) 76'	Report		Stadium: Craven Cottage; Attendance: 0 Referee: Robert Jones
Note: Live on Amazon Prime Sport

20 December 2020 14	Brighton & Hove Albion	1–1	Sheffield United	Falmer
12:00 GMT	Dunk (yellow card) 33'; Welbeck 87'	Report	Lundstram (red card) 40'; Bogle 63'; McGoldrick (yellow card) 70'; Osborn (yellow card) 86'; Burke (yellow card) 88'; Ramsdale (yellow card) 90'; Basham (yellow card) 90+3'	Stadium: Falmer Stadium; Attendance: 2,000; Referee: Peter Bankes
Note: Live on Sky Sports

27 December 2020 15	West Ham United	2–2	Brighton & Hove Albion	Stratford
14:15 GMT	Johnson 60'; Souček 82'	Report	Maupay 44'; Dunk 70'	Stadium: London Stadium; Attendance: 0 Referee: Simon Hooper
Note: Live on Sky Sports

29 December 2020 16	Brighton & Hove Albion	0–1	Arsenal	Falmer
18:00 GMT	Dunk (yellow card) 59'; Jahanbakhsh (yellow card) 65'	Report	Lacazette 66'	Stadium: Falmer Stadium; Attendance: 0 Referee: Martin Atkinson
Note: Live on Amazon Prime Sport

2 January 2021 17	Brighton & Hove Albion	3–3	Wolverhampton Wanderers	Falmer
17:30 GMT	Connolly 13'; Bissouma (yellow card) 22'; Maupay 46' (pen.); Burn (yellow card) 58'; Dunk 70'	Report	Saïss 19'; Burn 34' (o.g.); Neves 44' (pen.); Semedo (yellow card) 90+1'	Stadium: Falmer Stadium; Attendance: 0 Referee: Andrew Madley
Note: Live on Sky Sports

13 January 2021 18	Manchester City	1–0	Brighton & Hove Albion	Manchester
18:00 GMT	Foden 44'; Sterling (penalty missed) 90+2'	Report	Veltman (yellow card) 62'; Webster (yellow card) 77'	Stadium: Etihad Stadium; Attendance: 0 Referee: Darren England
Note: Live on BT Sport

16 January 2021 19	Leeds United	0–1	Brighton & Hove Albion	Leeds
15:00 GMT	Ayling (yellow card) 42'	Report	Maupay 17'; Webster (yellow card) 71'	Stadium: Elland Road; Attendance: 0 Referee: Kevin Friend
Note: Live on Sky Sports

27 January 2021 20	Brighton & Hove Albion	0–0	Fulham	Falmer
19:30 GMT	Bissouma (yellow card) 27'; Mac Allister (yellow card) 44'	Report	Reed (yellow card) 45+1'	Stadium: Falmer Stadium; Attendance: 0 Referee: Craig Pawson
Note: Live on BT Sport

31 January 2021 21	Brighton & Hove Albion	1–0	Tottenham Hotspur	Falmer
19:15 GMT	Trossard 17'; Maupay (yellow card) 71'; Burn (yellow card) 87'	Report	Alderweireld (yellow card) 66'	Stadium: Falmer Stadium; Attendance: 0 Referee: Peter Bankes
Note: Live on Sky Sports

3 February 2021 22	Liverpool	0–1	Brighton & Hove Albion	Anfield
20:15 GMT	Wijnaldum (yellow card) 45'	Report	Alzate 56'	Stadium: Anfield; Attendance: 0 Referee: Kevin Friend
Note: Live on BT Sport

6 February 2021 23	Burnley	1–1	Brighton & Hove Albion	Burnley
15:00 GMT	Mee (yellow card) 19'; Guðmundsson (yellow card) 28', (goal) 53'	Report	Dunk 36'	Stadium: Turf Moor; Attendance: 0 Referee: Anthony Taylor
Note: Live on Sky Sports

13 February 2021 24	Brighton & Hove Albion	0–0	Aston Villa	Falmer
20:00 GMT	Alzate (yellow card) 20'; Trossard (yellow card) 77'	Report	Grealish (yellow card) 21'; Douglas Luiz (yellow card) 70'; Sanson (yellow card) 89'	Stadium: Falmer Stadium; Attendance: 0 Referee: Darren England
Note: Live on Sky Sports

22 February 2021 25	Brighton & Hove Albion	1–2	Crystal Palace	Falmer
20:00 GMT	Burn (yellow card) 53'; Veltman 55', (yellow card) 84'	Report	Mateta 28'; Benteke 90+5'	Stadium: Falmer Stadium; Attendance: 0 Referee: Kevin Friend
Note: Live on Sky Sports

27 February 2021 26	West Bromwich Albion	1–0	Brighton & Hove Albion	West Bromwich
15:00 GMT	Bartley 11'	Report	Groß (penalty missed) 19'; Welbeck (penalty missed) 74'	Stadium: The Hawthorns; Attendance: 0 Referee: Lee Mason
Note: Live on Sky Sports

6 March 2021 27	Brighton & Hove Albion	1–2	Leicester City	Falmer
20:00 GMT	Lallana 10'	Report	Iheanacho 62'; Tielemans (yellow card) 76'; Amartey 87'	Stadium: Falmer Stadium; Attendance: 0 Referee: Michael Oliver
Note: Live on Sky Sports

14 March 2021 28	Southampton	1–2	Brighton & Hove Albion	Southampton
12:00 GMT	Adams 27'	Report	Dunk 16'; Trossard 56'	Stadium: St Mary's Stadium; Attendance: 0 Referee: Stuart Attwell
Note: Live on BBC One

20 March 2021 29	Brighton & Hove Albion	3–0	Newcastle United	Falmer
20:00 GMT	Trossard 45+3'; Welbeck 51'; Maupay 68'	Report	Dummett (yellow card) 63'	Stadium: Falmer Stadium; Attendance: 0 Referee: Anthony Taylor
Note: Live on Sky Sports

4 April 2021 30	Manchester United	2–1	Brighton & Hove Albion	Old Trafford
19:30 BST	Rashford 62'; Cavani (yellow card) 63'; Greenwood 83', (yellow card) 89'	Report	Welbeck 13'; Groß (yellow card) 42'; White (yellow card) 66'	Stadium: Old Trafford; Attendance: 0 Referee: Mike Dean
Note: Live on BT Sport

12 April 2021 31	Brighton & Hove Albion	0–0	Everton	Falmer
20:15 BST	Dunk (yellow card) 52'	Report	Keane (yellow card) 82'; Holgate (yellow card) 90+2'	Stadium: Falmer Stadium; Attendance: 0 Referee: Darren England
Note: Live on Sky Sports

20 April 2021 32	Chelsea	0–0	Brighton & Hove Albion	Fulham
20:15 BST	Jorginho (yellow card) 35'; Zouma (yellow card) 35'	Report	White (yellow card) 73' (yellow-red card) 90+2'	Stadium: Stamford Bridge; Attendance: 0 Referee: Stuart Attwell
Note: Live on Sky Sports

24 April 2021 33	Sheffield United	1–0	Brighton & Hove Albion	Sheffield
20:00 BST	McGoldrick 19', (yellow card) 24'; Baldock (yellow card) 77'; Stevens (yellow card) 88'	Report		Stadium: Bramall Lane; Attendance: 0 Referee: Kevin Friend
Note: Live on Sky Sports

1 May 2021 34	Brighton & Hove Albion	2–0	Leeds United	Falmer
15:00 BST	Groß 14' (pen.), (yellow card) 76'; Welbeck 79'	Report	Ayling (yellow card) 88'	Stadium: Falmer Stadium; Attendance: 0 Referee: Chris Kavanagh
Note: Live on Amazon Prime Sport

9 May 2021 35	Wolverhampton Wanderers	2–1	Brighton & Hove Albion	Wolverhampton
12:00 BST	Traoré 76'; Kilman (yellow card) 80'; Coady (yellow card) 83'; Gibbs-White 90'	Report	Dunk 13', (red card) 53'; Sánchez (yellow card) 85'; Bissouma (yellow card) 90+2'; Maupay (red card) 90+7'	Stadium: Molineux; Attendance: 0 Referee: Jonathan Moss
Note: Live on BBC One

15 May 2021 36	Brighton & Hove Albion	1–1	West Ham United	Falmer
20:00 BST	Bissouma (yellow card) 18'; Welbeck 84'	Report	Benrahma 87'	Stadium: Falmer Stadium; Attendance: 0 Referee: Andre Marriner
Note: Live on Sky Sports

18 May 2021 37	Brighton & Hove Albion	3–2	Manchester City	Falmer
19:00 BST	Jahanbakhsh (yellow card) 27'; Trossard 50'; Webster 72', (yellow card) 90+3'; Burn 76'; Sánchez (yellow card) 90+5'	Report	Gündoğan 2'; Cancelo (red card) 10'; Foden 48'; Silva (yellow card) 73'; Rodri (yellow card) 79'; Fernandinho (yellow card) 82'	Stadium: Falmer Stadium; Attendance: 7,945; Referee: Stuart Attwell
Note: Live on BT Sport

23 May 2021 38	Arsenal	2–0	Brighton & Hove Albion	Holloway
16:00 BST	Pépé 49', 60'	Report		Stadium: Emirates Stadium; Attendance: 10,000; Referee: Jonathan Moss
Note: Live on Sky Sports

=== FA Cup ===
10 January 2021 Third round	Newport County	1–1 (a.e.t.) (3–4 p)	Brighton & Hove Albion	Newport
19:45 GMT	Webster 90+6' (o.g.)	Report	March 90'	Stadium: Rodney Parade; Attendance: 0 Referee: Lee Mason
	Penalties
	Sheehan (penalty missed); Demetriou (penalty missed); Labadie (penalty scored); Taylor (penalty scored); Shephard (penalty missed); Proctor (penalty scored); Bennett (penalty missed)		(penalty scored) Groß; (penalty missed) Maupay; (penalty missed) Bissouma; (penalty scored) Dunk; (penalty missed) Trossard; (penalty scored) Pröpper; (penalty scored) Webster
Note: Live on BT Sport

23 January 2021 Fourth round	Brighton & Hove Albion	2–1	Blackpool	Falmer
15:00 GMT	Bissouma 27'; Alzate 58'	Report	Madine 45+1'	Stadium: Falmer Stadium; Attendance: 0 Referee: Darren England
Note: Live on BT Sport Extra

10 February 2021 Fifth round	Leicester City	1–0	Brighton & Hove Albion	Leicester
19:30 GMT	Pérez (yellow card) 44'; Tielemans (yellow card) 52'; Iheanacho 90+4'	Report	Bissouma (yellow card) 90+1'	Stadium: King Power Stadium; Attendance: 0 Referee: Mike Dean
Note: Live on BT Sport

=== EFL Cup ===
17 September 2020 Second round	Brighton & Hove Albion	4–0	Portsmouth	Falmer
19:45 BST	Groß (yellow card) 37'; Mac Allister 38'; Jahanbakhsh 54'; Bernardo 58'; Gyökeres 71'	Report	Marquis (yellow card) 40'	Stadium: Falmer Stadium; Attendance: 0 Referee: Matt Donohue
Note: Live on Sky Sports

23 September 2020 Third round	Preston North End	0–2	Brighton & Hove Albion	Preston
19:00 BST	Bayliss (yellow card) 10'	Report	Jahanbakhsh 57'; Mac Allister 75'	Stadium: Deepdale; Attendance: 0 Referee: Steve Martin

30 September 2020 Fourth round	Brighton & Hove Albion	0–3	Manchester United	Falmer
19:45 BST	Burn (yellow card) 43'; Veltman (yellow card) 79'	Report	McTominay 44'; Mata 73'; Pogba 80'; Lindelöf (yellow card) 86'	Stadium: Falmer Stadium; Attendance: 0 Referee: Graham Scott
Note: Live on Sky Sports

== Squad statistics ==
No.	Pos	Nat	Player	Total		Premier League		EFL Cup		FA Cup	
No.	Pos	Nat	Player	Apps	Goals	Apps	Goals	Apps	Goals	Apps	Goals
Goalkeepers
23	GK	(England) ENG	Jason Steele	4	0	0	0	3	0	1	0
26	GK	(Spain) ESP	Robert Sánchez	27	0	27	0	0	0	0	0
31	GK	(England) ENG	Christian Walton	2	0	0	0	0	0	2	0
Defenders
2	DF	(England) ENG	Tariq Lamptey	11	1	11	1	0	0	0	0
3	DF	(England) ENG	Ben White	39	0	36	0	1	0	2	0
4	DF	(England) ENG	Adam Webster	31	1	29	1	0	0	2	0
5	DF	(England) ENG	Lewis Dunk	37	5	33	5	1	0	3	0
6	DF	(Poland) POL	Michał Karbownik	1	0	0	0	0	0	1	0
20	DF	(England) ENG	Solly March	23	3	19+2	2	0	0	1+1	1
33	DF	(England) ENG	Dan Burn	32	1	23+4	1	3	0	2	0
34	DF	(Netherlands) NED	Joël Veltman	34	1	25+3	1	3	0	1+2	0
Midfielders
8	MF	(Mali) MLI	Yves Bissouma	39	2	35+1	1	0	0	2+1	1
10	MF	(Argentina) ARG	Alexis Mac Allister	27	3	13+8	1	3	2	2+1	0
11	MF	(Belgium) BEL	Leandro Trossard	38	5	30+5	5	0+1	0	0+2	0
13	MF	(Germany) GER	Pascal Groß	40	3	27+7	3	3	0	2+1	0
14	MF	(England) ENG	Adam Lallana	31	1	16+14	1	0	0	1	0
15	MF	(Poland) POL	Jakub Moder	13	0	7+5	0	0	0	1	0
16	MF	(Iran) IRI	Alireza Jahanbakhsh	25	2	6+15	0	3	2	1	0
17	MF	(Colombia) COL	Steven Alzate	17	2	10+5	1	0	0	2	1
19	MF	(Colombia) COL	Jose Izquierdo	1	0	0+1	0	0	0	0	0
24	MF	(Netherlands) NED	Davy Pröpper	10	0	1+5	0	2	0	1+1	0
25	MF	(Ecuador) ECU	Moisés Caicedo	0	0	0	0	0	0	0	0
44	MF	(Sweden) SWE	Peter Gwargis	2	0	0	0	0+2	0	0	0
47	MF	(England) ENG	Teddy Jenks	1	0	0	0	0+1	0	0	0
67	MF	(Germany) GER	Reda Khadra	1	0	0+1	0	0	0	0	0
Forwards
7	FW	(Republic of Ireland) IRL	Aaron Connolly	17	2	9+8	2	0	0	0	0
9	FW	(France) FRA	Neal Maupay	36	8	29+4	8	0+1	0	1+1	0
18	FW	(England) ENG	Danny Welbeck	24	6	17+7	6	0	0	0	0
21	FW	(Romania) ROU	Florin Andone	0	0	0	0	0	0	0	0
22	FW	(South Africa) RSA	Percy Tau	6	0	1+2	0	0	0	2+1	0
29	FW	(Switzerland) SUI	Andi Zeqiri	12	0	0+9	0	0	0	3	0
Players who left the club permanently or on loan during the season
1	GK	(Australia) AUS	Mathew Ryan	11	0	11	0	0	0	0	0
6	DF	(England) ENG	Dale Stephens	1	0	0	0	1	0	0	0
30	DF	(Brazil) BRA	Bernardo	7	1	2+1	0	3	1	0+1	0
41	MF	(England) ENG	Max Sanders	3	0	0	0	1+2	0	0	0
42	FW	(Sweden) SWE	Viktor Gyökeres	3	1	0	0	3	1	0	0
43	DF	(England) ENG	Alex Cochrane	1	0	0	0	0+1	0	0	0
46	DF	(England) ENG	Haydon Roberts	2	0	0	0	1+1	0	0	0
49	MF	(Republic of Ireland) IRL	Jayson Molumby	3	0	0+1	0	2	0	0	0

Note

• Dale Stephens joined Burnley on 24 September on a permanent transfer.

• Viktor Gyökeres joined Swansea City on 2 October on a season–long loan deal.

• Alex Cochrane joined Union SG on 5 October on a season–long loan deal.

• Haydon Roberts joined Rochdale on 16 October on a season–long loan deal.

• Jayson Molumby joined Preston North End on 5 January on loan for the remainder of the season.

• Bernardo joined Red Bull Salzburg on 19 January on a loan deal until the end of the season.

• Maty Ryan joined Arsenal on 22 January on loan until the end of the season.

• Max Sanders joined Lincoln City on 1 February on a permanent transfer.
