= Tom McGill =

Canadian soccer player (born 2000)

Personal information
- Full name: Thomas Peter Wayne McGill
- Date of birth: 25 March 2000 (age 26)
- Place of birth: Belleville, Ontario, Canada
- Height: 6 ft 1 in (1.85 m)
- Position: Goalkeeper

Team information
- Current team: Brighton & Hove Albion
- Number: 38

Youth career
- 2014–2018: Brighton & Hove Albion

Senior career*
Years	Team	Apps	(Gls)
2018–	Brighton & Hove Albion	0	(0)
2018	→ Worthing (loan)	0	(0)
2018–2019	→ Greenwich Borough (loan)	14	(0)
2019	→ Basingstoke Town (loan)	11	(0)
2020	→ Crawley Town (loan)	0	(0)
2020–2021	→ Crawley Town (loan)	1	(0)
2024–2025	→ Milton Keynes Dons (loan)	25	(0)

International career
2017	England U17	6	(0)
- * Club domestic league appearances and goals as of 11:47, 2 February 2025 (UTC)

Thomas Peter Wayne McGill (born 25 March 2000) is a Canadian professional soccer player who plays as a goalkeeper for Premier League club Brighton & Hove Albion.

He has previously had loan spells at Worthing, Greenwich Borough, Basingstoke Town, Crawley Town, and Milton Keynes Dons.

Born in Canada, he made six appearances for the England under-17 national team and was called up to the England under-19 squad, before confirming his allegiance to Canada in 2023 after accepting a call-up.

== Club career ==
McGill was born in Belleville, Ontario, Canada to a Canadian father and English mother, moving to England at the age of four with his mother after his parents split up. He joined Brighton & Hove Albion's academy in 2014, aged 14. On 30 July 2018, McGill joined Worthing on a season-long loan. However, eight days later, his loan at Worthing was cancelled, after Lucas Covolan signed a new contract at Worthing. On 31 August, he joined Greenwich Borough on a loan deal until 4 January 2019. On 11 January 2019, he joined Basingstoke Town on loan until the end of the season for whom he made 11 league appearances.

In July of the same year, McGill signed a new two-year contract with Brighton, extending his stay at the club until June 2021.

On 24 January 2020, he joined EFL League Two club Crawley Town on loan until the end of the season, before rejoining Crawley on a season-long loan deal on 2 September. His professional debut came on three days later, in a 3–1 EFL Cup defeat at home to Millwall. McGill made his Football League debut on 3 November, coming on as a substitute in the 55th minute for the injured Glenn Morris, where he conceded the only goal of the game in the 1–0 away defeat at Walsall. He started Crawley's following match on 8 November – a 6–5 FA Cup victory over Torquay United – but suffered a head injury shortly into the second half, leaving him unconscious, and was substituted off for Stuart Nelson. On 12 January 2021, McGill was recalled from his loan spell by his parent club Brighton & Hove Albion.

He was named in a Brighton matchday squad for the first time on 3 February, staying on the bench alongside fellow goalkeeper Christian Walton in a 1–0 away win against defending champions Liverpool, claiming their first league win at Anfield since 1982.

With Robert Sánchez falling out of favour and Jason Steele taking the number one spot, McGill spent the final stages of the 2022–23 season as back-up to Steele, with Albion's manager Roberto De Zerbi saying that "He deserved the possibility to come on the bench." Brighton went on to seal a place in the 2023–24 UEFA Europa League for their first European qualification in the club's history. In June 2023, Brighton announced McGill had signed a new two-year contract with a one-year option to remain at the club.

McGill played his first professional match in almost two years on 22 August 2023, coming with the under-21s in the 3–2 away win over League Two outfit Walsall in the opening group stage match of the EFL Trophy.

On 24 July 2024, McGill joined League Two club Milton Keynes Dons on a season-long loan. He made his debut for the club on 10 August 2024 in a 1–2 home defeat to Bradford City. He was recalled by Brighton on 4 February 2025.

== International career ==
=== England ===
McGill earned six caps for the England under-17s. In March 2019, he was involved with England under-19s but remained uncapped.

=== Canada ===
In March 2023, McGill accepted a call-up to the senior Canada side ahead of two CONCACAF Nations League matches against Curaçao and Honduras. In June 2023, McGill received another call-up to Canada, as part of the final squad for the Nations League Finals in Las Vegas. On 19 June, McGill was called-up to the final squad for the 2023 CONCACAF Gold Cup.

In June 2024, McGill was called-up to Canada's 26-man squad for the 2024 Copa América.

== Career statistics ==
As of 2 February 2025

Appearances and goals by club, season and competition
Club	Season	League			FA Cup		League Cup		Other		Total	
Club	Season	Division	Apps	Goals	Apps	Goals	Apps	Goals	Apps	Goals	Apps	Goals
Brighton & Hove Albion	2018–19	Premier League	0	0	0	0	0	0	—		0	0
Brighton & Hove Albion	2019–20	Premier League	0	0	0	0	0	0	—		0	0
Brighton & Hove Albion	2020–21	Premier League	0	0	0	0	0	0	—		0	0
Brighton & Hove Albion	2021–22	Premier League	0	0	0	0	0	0	—		0	0
Brighton & Hove Albion	2022–23	Premier League	0	0	0	0	0	0	—		0	0
Brighton & Hove Albion	2023–24	Premier League	0	0	0	0	0	0	0	0	0	0
Brighton & Hove Albion	2024–25	Premier League	0	0	0	0	0	0	0	0	0	0
Brighton & Hove Albion	Total		0	0	0	0	0	0	0	0	0	0
Brighton & Hove Albion U21	2021–22	—							3 (Note: Appearances in EFL Trophy)	0	3	0
Brighton & Hove Albion U21	2023–24	—							6	0	6	0
Brighton & Hove Albion U21	Total		—						9	0	9	0
Worthing (loan) (Note: On 6 August 2018, the loan deal was cancelled eight days after signing with no fixtures being played, after Lucas Covolan signed a new contract at Worthing.)	2018–19	Isthmian Premier	—		—		—		—		—	
Greenwich Borough (loan)	2018–19	Isthmian South East	14	0	—		—		0	0	14	0
Basingstoke Town (loan)	2018–19	Southern Premier South	11	0	0	0	—		0	0	11	0
Crawley Town (loan)	2019–20	League Two	0	0	0	0	0	0	0	0	0	0
Crawley Town (loan)	2020–21	League Two	1	0	1	0	1	0	2	0	5	0
Milton Keynes Dons (loan)	2024–25	League Two	25	0	0	0	0	0	0	0	25	0
Career total			51	0	1	0	1	0	11	0	64	0
