= Brian Galach =

Polish footballer (born 2001)

Personal information
- Full name: Brian Galach
- Date of birth: 16 May 2001 (age 25)
- Place of birth: Poland
- Height: 5 ft 9 in (1.74 m)
- Position: Striker

Youth career
- 2010–2017: Leyton Orient
- 2017–2018: Aldershot Town

Senior career*
Years	Team	Apps	(Gls)
2018–2021	Crawley Town	1	(0)
2018	→ Burgess Hill Town (loan)	5	(0)
2020	→ Billericay Town (loan)	5	(0)
2021–2023	Wisła Płock II	26	(12)
2021	→ Stomil Olsztyn (loan)	3	(0)
2022–2023	→ Podlasie Biała Podlaska (loan)	16	(2)
- * Club domestic league appearances and goals as of 22:00, 21 June 2023 (UTC)

Brian Galach (born 16 May 2001) is a Polish professional footballer who plays as a striker.

== Early and personal life ==
Galach was born in Poland, and attended Chingford Foundation School.

== Club career ==
=== Crawley Town ===
After spending time with Leyton Orient (who he joined at under-9 level) and Aldershot Town, Galach signed for Crawley Town in June 2018. On 4 September 2018, Galach made his Crawley debut during their EFL Trophy group-stage tie against Tottenham Hotspur U23s. On 17 November 2018, Galach joined Isthmian League side Burgess Hill Town on a short-term loan, where he made 6 appearances and scored one goal. He made his league debut for Crawley in the final match of the 2018–19 season as a stoppage time substitute in a 3-1 League Two victory over Tranmere Rovers on 4 May 2019. On 3 January 2020, Galach joined Billericay Town on a one-month loan. On 4 February 2020, his loan was extended to the end of February. He played 6 times for them without scoring. He scored his first goals for Crawley on 10 November 2020 when he scored twice in an EFL Trophy group game against Ipswich Town. He left Crawley on 11 February 2021 after his contract was mutually terminated, having scored twice in eight matches in all competitions during his spell at the club.

=== Wisla Płock ===
On 16 February 2021, he signed for the reserve team of Wisła Płock on a contract until the end of the season. In July 2021, he moved on loan to Stomil Olsztyn. On 21 July 2022, he joined III liga side Podlasie Biała Podlaska on a one-year loan.

== International career ==
In October 2015, Galach was called up to a training camp by the Poland under-15 national team.

== Career statistics ==
As of 21 June 2023

Appearances and goals by club, season and competition
Club	Season	League			National cup (Note: Includes Polish Cup)		League cup (Note: Includes EFL Cup)		Other		Total	
Club	Season	Division	Apps	Goals	Apps	Goals	Apps	Goals	Apps	Goals	Apps	Goals
Crawley Town	2018–19	League Two	1	0	0	0	0	0	2 (Note: Appearance(s) in EFL Trophy)	0	3	0
Crawley Town	2019–20	League Two	0	0	0	0	0	0	2	0	2	0
Crawley Town	2020–21	League Two	0	0	0	0	1	0	2	2	3	2
Crawley Town	Total		1	0	0	0	1	0	6	2	8	2
Burgess Hill Town (loan)	2018–19	Isthmian League Premier Division	5	0	0	0	—		1 (Note: Appearance(s) in Alan Turvey Trophy)	1	6	1
Billericay Town (loan)	2019–20	National League South	5	0	0	0	—		1 (Note: Appearance(s) in Essex Senior Cup)	0	6	0
Wisła Płock II	2020–21	IV liga Masovia	11	3	—		—		2 (Note: Appearance(s) in Polish regional cup)	1	13	4
Wisła Płock II	2021–22	IV liga Masovia	15	9	—		—		—		15	9
Wisła Płock II	Total		26	12	—		—		2	1	28	13
Stomil Olsztyn (loan)	2021–22	I liga	3	0	1	0	—		—		4	0
Podlasie Biała Podlaska (loan)	2022–23	III liga, group IV	16	2	—		—		—		16	2
Career total			56	14	1	0	1	0	10	4	68	18
