= AFC Whyteleafe =

Association football club in England

Coordinates: 51°18′17″N 0°4′47″W

- Full name: AFC Whyteleafe
- Nickname: 'Leafe
- Founded: 2021
- Ground: Flamingo Park
- Capacity: 2,500
- Chairman: Kelly Waters
- Manager: Ennio Gonnella
- League: Isthmian League Premier Division
- 2025–26: Isthmian League South East Division, 4th of 22 (promoted via play-offs)
- Website: http://www.afcwhyteleafe.com
Home colours	Away colours

AFC Whyteleafe is an English football club established in 2021 by Chairman Kelly Waters. From the 2026/27 season the club will compete in the Isthmian League Premier Division, having won the South East Division play-off final in the 2025/26 season, and will play its home matches at Flamingo Park in Chislehurst, London, sharing with Cray Wanderers FC.

== History ==
AFC Whyteleafe was formed in 2021 by Kelly Waters, replacing another club, Whyteleafe FC, which folded shortly before. Waters had hoped to purchase the Church Road premises before it was sold to Irama Sports in February 2021, but he discovered the auction a week too late and the sale to Irama went through. Following the withdrawal of Whyteleafe FC from the Isthmian League, and inspired by the story of AFC Wimbledon, AFC Whyteleafe was born.

The new club was granted a position in the Surrey South Eastern Combination League for the 2021/22 season, having formed a merge of registration with Balham FC B Team. This still left the club with less than one month to build a squad from scratch, ready for their debut match on 4 September 2021 at home to Earlsfield 2018.

A crucial part of the successful formation of the club was securing a ground. Church Road was the preferred choice and a four-year deal was reached with Irama to play there.

Following a successful first season, AFC Whyteleafe joined up with Whyteleafe Youth FC ahead of the 2022/23 season to form one AFC Whyteleafe comprising a men's first team and over 30 Youth teams from U7 to U18.

In May 2022, the club was admitted into the Southern Counties East League Division One which sits at Step 6 in the National League System. The club achieved a respectable 8th-place finish in their debut season at Step 6. The following season saw Whyteleafe promoted as champions.

The 2024–25 season saw AFC Whyteleafe crowned champions of the Combined Counties Premier Division South. Despite being third heading into the final day of the season, points deductions for both Jersey Bulls and Redhill saw the club finish top of the league, promoted to the Isthmian League South East Division. The club also made a historic appearance at Wembley in the 2025 FA Vase Final, losing 2–1 to Whitstable Town after extra time.

The 2025–26 season saw the club achieve a third successive promotion, defeating AFC Croydon Athletic on penalties to win the Isthmian South East Division play-offs.

== Ground ==
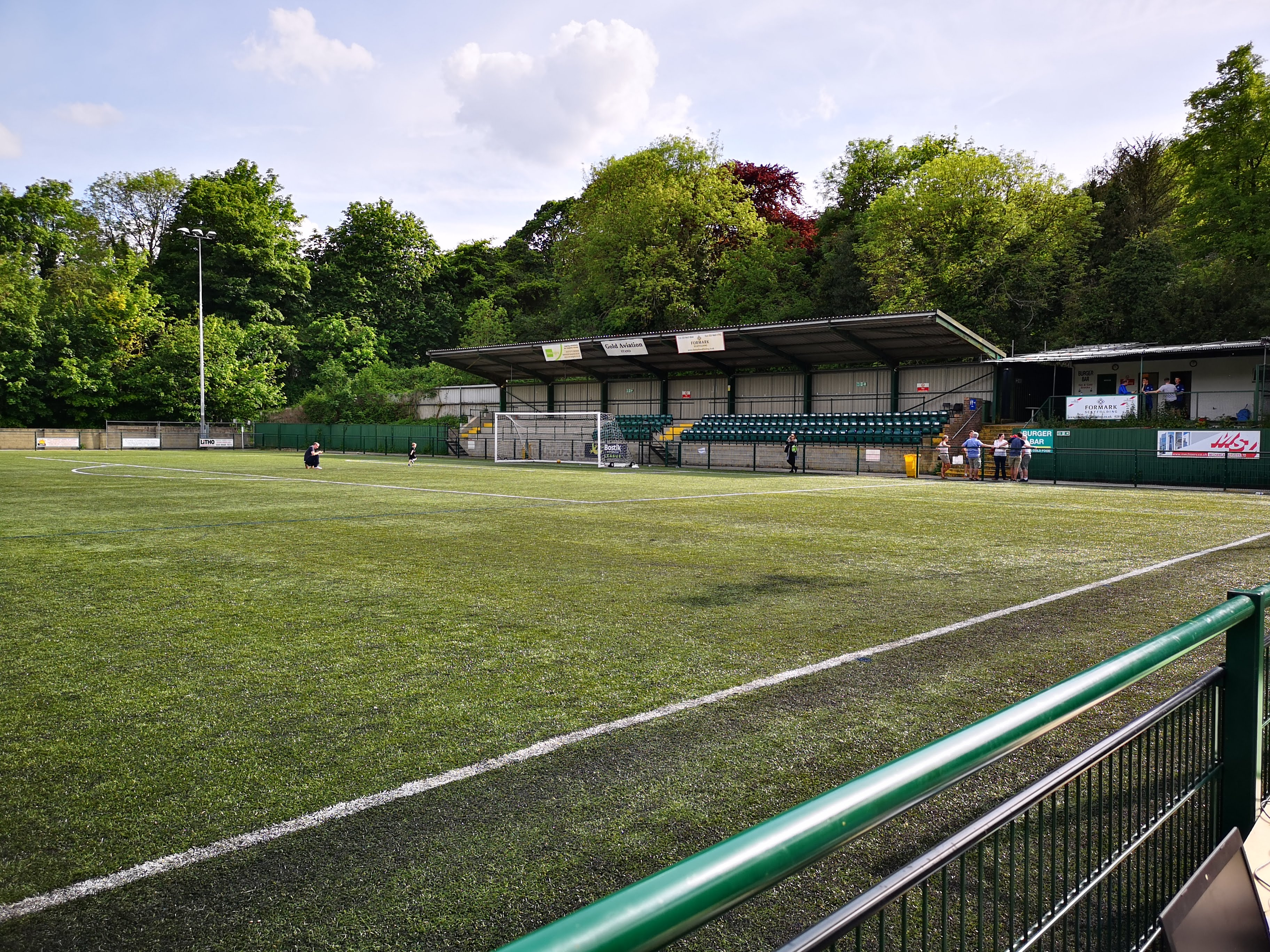
Church Road, the club's home ground

After formation, AFC Whyteleafe played their home games at Church Road, Whyteleafe, Surrey, CR3 0AR.

The site of Church Road was formerly farmland, and the farm's existing buildings were converted into the clubhouse and dressing rooms. Whyteleafe FC originally planned to add a running track and cricket pitch to the complex, but these plans were abandoned. Floodlights were added in the early 1980s and a new main stand added in 1999 for the club's first round FA Cup match against Chester City, which saw a record attendance of 2,164. Some of the turnstiles added at the ground were purchased from Stoke City's Victoria Ground after they moved to the Britannia Stadium in 1997.

In June 2021, following the purchase of the ground by Singapore-based company Irama, Whyteleafe FC left Church Road due to no agreement being reached with Irama for a new lease with the club.

In August 2021 the new club, AFC Whyteleafe, was formed under new management and a 4-year agreement was reached to play at Church Road.

Following promotion to Step 3 of the National League System, the club announced a ground-sharing agreement with Cray Wanderers (also Step 3) to play home matches during the 2026–27 season at Wanderers' Flamingo Park ground in Chislehurst, Bromley. Church Road would continue to be used for training and youth teams matches.

== Committee ==
In the summer of 2025, having gone up 4 levels in 4 years, a management committee was formed to assist the chairman with the higher demands of step 4 football.

Name	Role
Kelly Waters	Chairman
Niall Maguire	Club Secretary
Will Blundell-Moseley	Finance
James Lacey	Commercial
Gillian Bullen	Match Day
Kieron Horn	Welfare Officer

== Management/Coaching Staff ==
For the first 4 years the team was managed by owner/manager Kelly Waters. After winning back to back titles and making a historic appearance at Wembley in the FA Vase final, Kelly handed over the reigns. The current management team is as follows:

Name	Role
Ennio Gonnella	First Team Manager
Kelly Waters	Assistant Manager
Nathan White	First Team Coach
Danny Rose	Goalkeeping Coach
Wayne Bullen	Assistant Coach
Milvin Boadi	Analyst
Lydia Passera-Hughes	Physio

== Squad ==
As of Nov 2026

Note: Flags indicate national team as defined under FIFA eligibility rules; some limited exceptions apply. Players may hold more than one non-FIFA nationality.

No.	Pos.	Nation	Player
1	GK	SVK	Slavomir Huk
13	GK	ENG	Kyle Defraine
2	CM	ENG	Helge Orome
3	FB	ENG	Montel McKenzie
4	CM	ENG	Matty Warren(captain)
5	CB	ENG	Aaron Goode
6	CB	ENG	Tobi Omole
7	CM	ENG	Daniel Bennett
8	CM	ENG	Marcus Sablier

No.	Pos.	Nation	Player
9	FW	ENG	Toby Aromolaran
10	FW	ENG	Devonte West
11	FW	ENG	Palace Francis
15	FB	ENG	Peter Ojemen
18	CM	ENG	Jack Jebb
20	CB	ENG	Geofrey Okonkwo
21	CB	ENG	Dean Gunner
22	CM	ENG	Ansu Janneh
24	FW	IRQ	Zaid Al-Hussaini

== Honours ==
- FA Vase
  - Runners-up: 2024–25
- Isthmian League South East Division (Step 4)
  - Promotion play-off winners: 2025–26
- Combined Counties Football League (Step 5)
  - Premier Division South champions: 2024–25
- Southern Counties East Football League (Step 6)
  - Division One champions: 2023–24
- Surrey South Eastern Combination (Step 8)
  - Intermediate league runners-up 2021–22

== Records ==
(Competitive matches only)

Men's first team:

- Best League Performance: 4th - Isthmian League South East Division (2025/26)
- Best FA Cup Performance: First Qualifying Round (2025/26)
- Best FA Vase Performance: Runners-up (2024/25)
- Best FA Trophy Performance: Third Qualifying Round (2026/27)
- Record Home Attendance:
  - 2,000 v Andover New Street - FA Vase Semi Final 1st Leg, 29 March 2025
- Biggest Wins:
  - East Grinstead Town F.C. 0-8 AFC Whyteleafe - Isthmian League Division One South East, 24 February 2026
  - AFC Whyteleafe 8-0 Crowborough Athletic F.C. - Isthmian League Division One South East, 8 November 2025
- Biggest Defeat:
  - Tooting Bec Reserves 6-2 AFC Whyteleafe - Surrey South Eastern Combination Intermediate League, 11 September 2021
- Highest Scoring Match:
  - AFC Whyteleafe 8-3 Greenways - SCEFL Division One, 27 April 2024
- Top 5 All-time club appearances (competitive games only, as at 15 Nov 2026):
  - Helge Orome - 168
  - Alton Leeward - 140
  - Daniel Bennett - 118
  - Aaron Goode - 114
  - Corey Holder - 111
- Top 5 All-time club Goalscorers (competitive games only, as at 15 Nov 2026):
  - Aaron Watson - 57
  - Daniel Bennett - 45
  - Ryan Gondoh - 39
  - Helge Orome - 34
  - Gus Ward - 32
- Most Goals by a Player in a Season: Aaron Watson - 32 (2023/24)
- Most League Goals by a Player in a Season: Aaron Watson - 25 (2023/24)
- Most Goals in a Single Match:
  - Daniel Adjei - 5 vs. Bermondsey Town - SCEFL Division One, 10 December 2022
- Competitive Results Summary by Season:
  - 2021/22 Played 29, W21, D2, L6 (Win% 72.4%)
  - 2022/23 Played 38, W15, D11, L12 (Win% 39.5%)
  - 2023/24 Played 45, W28, D7, L10 (Win% 62.2%)
  - 2024/25 Played 54, W43, D2, L9 (Win% 79.6%)
  - 2025/26 Played 55, W34, D8, L13 (Win% 61.8%)
