= 2020–21 Crawley Town F.C. season =

Crawley Town
2020–21 season
- Chairman: Ziya Eren
- Manager: John Yems
- Stadium: Broadfield Stadium
- League Two: 12th
- FA Cup: Fourth round
- EFL Cup: First round
- EFL Trophy: Group stage
- Top goalscorer: League: Max Watters (13); All: Max Watters (16)
Home colours	Away colours

The 2020–21 season is Crawley Town's 125th season in their history and the sixth consecutive season in the League Two, the fourth tier of English football, following a 13th-place finish in the previous season. The club will also participate in the FA Cup, EFL Cup and EFL Trophy. The season covers the period from 1 July 2020 to 30 June 2021.

== Background and pre-season ==
The 2019–20 season saw Crawley Town compete in League Two for the fifth consecutive season. Despite the club reaching the Fourth round of the EFL Cup, their best performance in the competition, manager Gabriele Cioffi left the club by mutual consent on 2 December 2019, with the club having won just once in their previous 11 matches with the club 17th in League Two. Cioffi was replaced by former manager John Yems three days later on a deal until the end of the season. Following an upturn in the club's form, with Crawley losing just 2 of their following 11 matches, Yems' contract was extended until the end of the 2022–23 season in late January 2020. However, in March 2020, the League Two season was postponed due to the COVID-19 pandemic, with Crawley still having a further 9 games to play. The season was later cancelled, with Crawley finishing 13th after clubs agreed to base the final table on points per game.

Following the conclusion of the previous season, defender Jamie Sendles-White, midfielders Jimmy Smith and Josh Payne and forward Ibrahim Meite were all released following the expiration of their contracts, whilst David Sesay, Josh Doherty, Ashley Nathaniel-George, George Francomb, Dannie Bulman and Lewis Young all signed new contracts. Ollie Palmer and Panutche Camara were both offered new contracts by the club, but rejected these offers, instead signing for League One clubs AFC Wimbledon and Plymouth Argyle respectively. Forward Beryly Lubala also left the club after League One side Blackpool signed the player for an undisclosed fee on 1 September 2020, and Gyliano van Velzen left by mutual consent the following day.

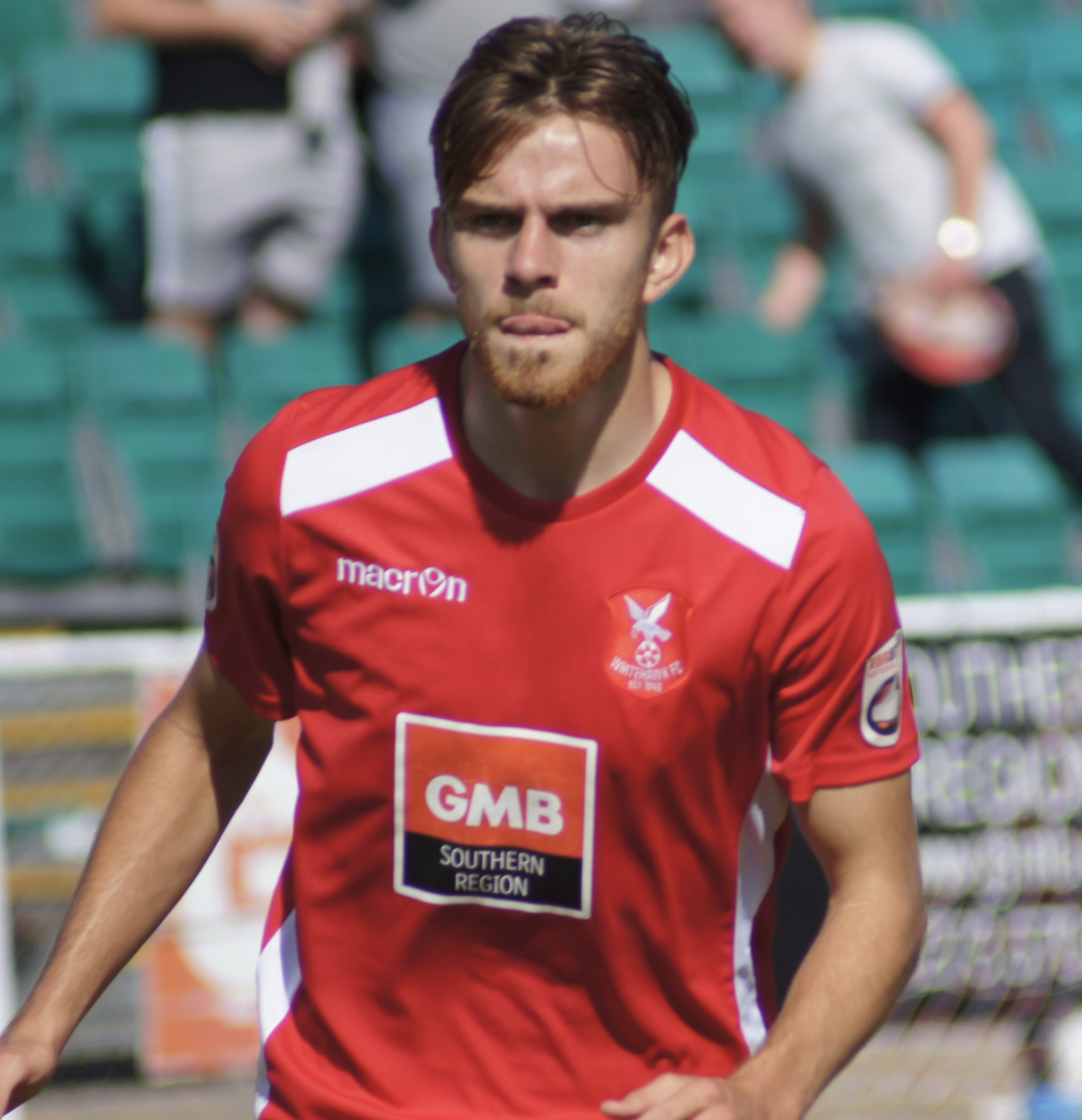
Archie Davies (pictured in 2017) joined the club on a free transfer in summer 2020

Across the summer 2020 transfer window, the club brought in defenders Archie Davies and Tony Craig from Brighton & Hove Albion and Bristol Rovers, midfielders Sam Matthews, Tyler Frost and Jake Hessenthaler from Bristol Rovers, Reading and Grimsby Town, forward Sam Ashford from Hemel Hempstead Town and winger Zaid Al-Hussaini, all following the expiry of their contracts at their previous clubs. Goalkeeper Tom McGill also rejoined the club on a season-long loan from Brighton & Hove Albion, having been on loan at the club for the second half of the previous season.

Due to the COVID-19 pandemic, the beginning of the League Two season, which was originally due to occur in August 2020, was delayed to 12 September 2020, whilst the first round of the EFL Cup was scheduled to take place on 5 September 2020.

=== Pre-season ===
On 14 August 2020, Crawley announced their first pre-season friendly against the Crystal Palace under-23 team, which took place on 15 August 2020. Despite being 1–0 down at half-time, second-half goals from Sam Ashford and Brian Galach helped secure a 2–1 victory. The following week, on 22 August 2020, Crawley drew 2–2 in a friendly against the Tottenham Hotspur under-23 team with Crawley's goals coming from Ricky German and Emmanuel Adebowale in the last eight minutes. Crawley's third friendly match took place three days later, with the club drawing 1–1 against the Watford under-23 team at Hop Oast in Horsham.

Win	Draw	Loss

Date	Time (Note: Time shown in local time (BST or GMT))	Opponent	Venue	Result F–A	Scorers	Attendance	Ref.
15 August 2020	13:00	Crystal Palace U23	Home	2–1	Ashford, Galach	0 (Note: Match played behind closed doors)	
22 August 2020		Tottenham Hotspur U23	Away	2–2	German, Adebowale	0	
25 August 2020		Watford U23	Home	1–1	Nadesan	0	

== Review ==
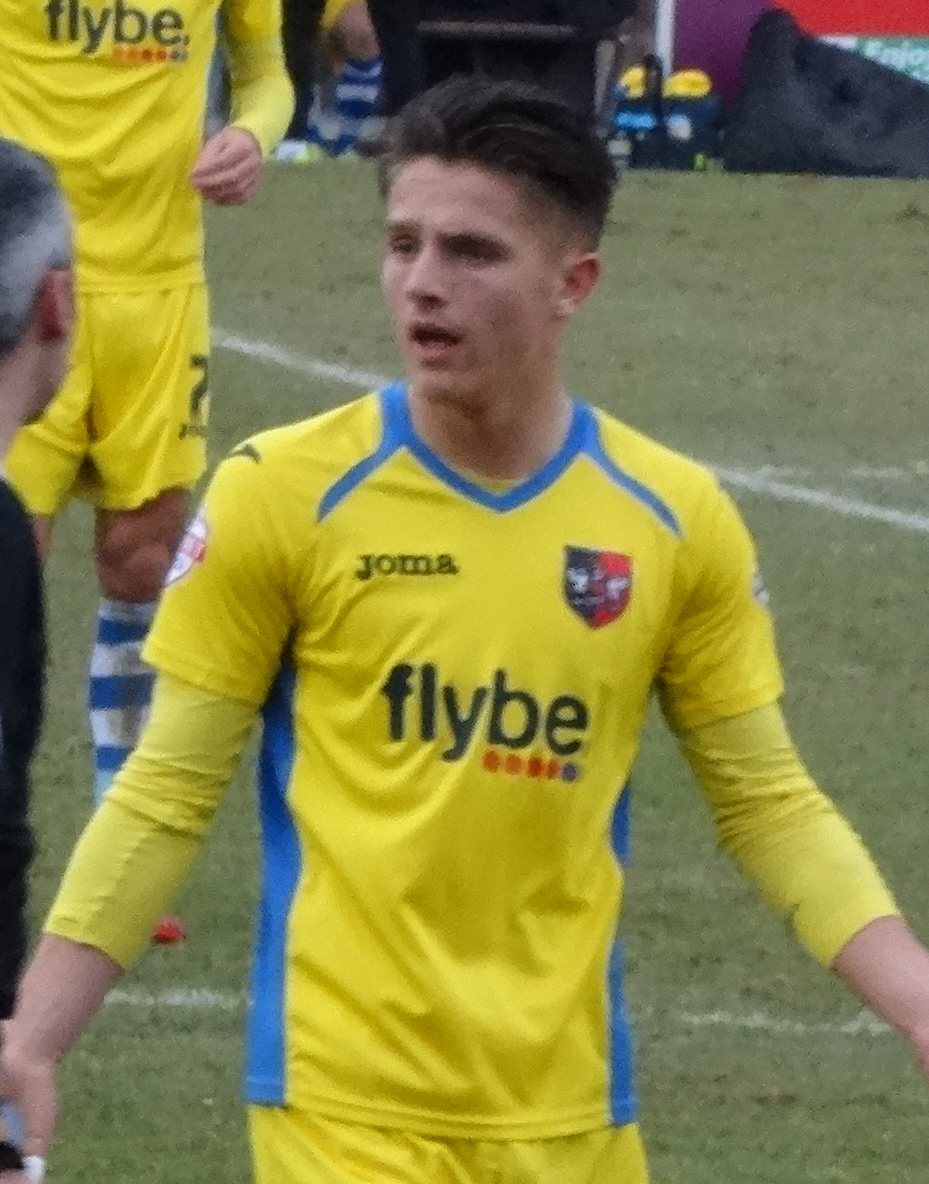
Tom Nichols (pictured in 2015) scored on his debut for Crawley in September 2020

=== September ===
Crawley started the season with a home EFL Cup tie to Championship side Millwall in the first round of the competition on 5 September 2020. After going 2–0 down after 31 minutes, as a result of a Scott Malone goal and a Jordan Tunnicliffe own goal, Sam Ashford scored on his senior debut from a one-on-one situation on 33 minutes to get a goal back for Crawley before a Matt Smith header scored a 3–1 victory for Millwall. Two days later, Crawley signed former Bristol Rovers forward Tom Nichols on a one-year contract. Crawley's second match of the season came in the EFL Trophy on 8 September 2020 after losing 2–1 with Nathan Ferguson scoring Crawley's goal after 78 minutes. Crawley's League Two campaign began on 12 September, with Crawley playing away to Port Vale. They lost 2–0 as a result of a Mark Cullen brace. Their first victory of the season came in their following league match, with Crawley beating Scunthorpe United 1–0 at home. Tom Nichols scored the only goal of the game after 15 minutes on his first league start for Crawley. Crawley then won 3–2 away at Oldham Athletic, with Danny Rowe opening the scoring for Oldham after 30 minutes, though Crawley equalised within a minute as Ashley Nadesan scored from a low Tarryn Allarakhia cross. George Francomb scored off the post from 25 yards out after 39 minutes to put Crawley into the lead and Nichols doubled Crawley's lead with a header with a header on 69 minutes, before Conor McAleny scored Oldham' second with 10 minutes remaining.

=== October ===
Crawley's first draw of the season came on 3 October 2020 with a 1–1 draw at home to Southend United; Nadesan opened the scoring for Crawley after 21 minutes before Southend equalised with six minutes remaining. Midfielders Ashley Nathaniel-George and Filipe Morais left the club; Nathaniel-George for an undisclosed fee to Southend United, whilst Morais agreed to mutually terminate his contract. Crawley signed forward Max Watters and defender Nick Tsaroulla on one-year contracts, following the expiry of their contracts at Doncaster Rovers and Brentford respectively. They lost 2–0 away to Cheltenham Town, with Tony Craig scoring an own goal for Cheltenham before Andy Williams scored their second. Midfielder Henry Burnett joined the club on a one-year contract. Crawley lost their second EFL Trophy game 2–1 at home to Arsenal under-21, with Watters scoring on his debut for Crawley. Jake Hesketh joined on a season-long loan from Southampton. On 17 October 2020, they defeated Morecambe 4–0 at home; Francomb scored from the edge of the area in the 52nd minute, before Watters scored two goals on his league debut to Crawley on 67 and 71 minutes respectively to make the score 3–0. Tyler Frost scored his first goal of the season in the 77th minute to complete the scoring. Watters scored again in Crawley's following match to put them 1–0 up against Exeter City, but Exeter scored twice in the second half to consign Crawley to a 2–1 defeat. Crawley drew 1–1 with Salford City, with Francomb scoring his third of the season after 72 minutes after Salford scored through James Wilson in the 57th minute. On 27 October 2020, Crawley again won 4–0 at home, this time against Tranmere Rovers; Crawley scored three goals in thirteen first-half minutes with Watters opening the scoring after 13 minutes, before Nichols and Jordan Tunnicliffe scored in the 21st and 24th minutes respectively. Frost finished the scoring after 77 minutes with a low shot into the bottom corner. Crawley won again with a 2–1 victory over Cambridge United, who took an early lead through Joe Ironside. Crawley equalised in the 44th minute through Watters, who finished first-time from an assist from Nichols, and Nichols scored himself in the 56th minute with a header from a corner, before Hesketh was sent off in the 87th minute.

=== November ===
Crawley were defeated 1–0 by Walsall in their first match of November, with former Crawley defender Mat Sadler scoring Walsall's only goal in the 74th minute. Goalkeeper Stuart Nelson joined the club on a three-month deal on 7 November 2020. The following day, Crawley defeated Torquay United away 6–5 after extra time. Torquay were 2–0 up at half-time with goals from Aaron Nemane and Ben Whitfield, before a head injury early in the second half saw keeper McGill substituted in place of new signing Nelson after the game was held up for 16 minutes. Crawley got a goal back through a Nichols penalty won by Nadesan after 83 minutes, before they equalised in the 14th minute of second-half added time through Watters. Torquay again took the lead in the 18th minute of added time through Josh Umerah, before Tunnicliffe scored tapped in with his right foot in the 21st minute of added time, to send the match to extra time. Asa Hall converted two penalties either side of half time in extra time to put the hosts 5–3 ahead, but two late goals from Nichols, in the 108th and 113th minutes respectively, completed his hat-trick and levelled the tie once again. Crawley won the tie in the 118th minute through Ashley Nadesan with a left-footed shot. Crawley were eliminated from the 2020–21 EFL Trophy after finishing 3rd, despite winning their final group stage match 2–0 at home to Ipswich Town; Brian Galach opened the scoring with a header from an Ashford cross after 17 minutes, before he scored his second goal after 55 minutes. Crawley drew 1–1 in League Two away to Harrogate Town, with Watters opening the scoring for Crawley after 27 minutes after a pass from Nichols from the byline. However, Harrogate striker Jack Muldoon equalised after 85 minutes with his sixth goal of the season. Crawley lost their 14-game unbeaten run at home with a 3–0 defeat to Carlisle United. Carlisle opened the scoring in the 43rd minute through Rhys Bennett, and their second and third goals came through Joshua Kayode and Aaron Hayden in the 55th and 62nd minutes respectively. Crawley defender David Sesay was sent off after 80 minutes, having received a straight red card for a professional foul. They then recorded a second successive home league defeat as, despite a 4th-minute opener from Watters to put Crawley 1–0 up at home to Grimsby Town, goals either side of half time from Matt Green and Max Wright saw Crawley record a 2–1 defeat. Crawley progressed to the third round of the FA Cup after beating League One side AFC Wimbledon 2–1. Wimbledon took the lead through a Joe Pigott header after 22 minutes, but Nadesan's chipped shot from Jack Powell's through ball in the 30th minute equalised the score. Watters scored the winner for Crawley with a right-footed shot from close range in the 50th minute.

=== December ===
Crawley's first match of the month 1–1 with away to Colchester United, who took the lead after 13 minutes. Crawley equalised in the 20th-minute through Tunnicliffe following a corner. Midfielder Zaid Al-Hussaini joined Weymouth on a month-long loan. Crawley were behind at half-time away to Mansfield on 5 December 2020, but Crawley scored three goals in the first 14 minutes of the second half, with Watters equalising on 49 minutes, before Dallison put Crawley in the lead in the 54th minute and Watters extended their advantage in the 59th minute with a dipping finish following a through ball by Jake Hessenthaler. Mansfield got a goal back in the 72nd minute before Mansfield equalised the tie through Andy Cook in the third minute of added time. Crawley took the lead against Barrow through Watters in the 23rd minute, before Barrow equalised through a penalty kick ten minutes later. Barrow took the lead in the 50th minute through Sam Hird, before Crawley equalised through a close-range Watters shot in the 58th minute. Barrow's Connor Brown was sent off with a second yellow card in the 68th minute. Crawley scored their third goal in the 81st minute after Nichols 'coolly slotted home' a penalty kick, and Watters completed his hat-trick in the 93rd minute after an 'unselfish' pass from Nadesan, rounding off a 4–2 victory in front of 650 spectators. TV personality Mark Wright signed for the club on non-contract terms, having previously had a spell at the club during the 2006–07 season. Crawley drew 1–1 with Bradford City; after going behind after 11 minutes through Lee Novak, Crawley equalised with a Harry Pritchard own goal in the 25th minute following a Sam Matthews free kick. Crawley took the lead against Leyton Orient in the 15th minute with a Josh Coulson own goal again following a Matthews free kick. Orient equalised in the 41st minute with a Dallison own goal from a Jobi McAnuff shot, though a 'clinical finish' from Watters eight minutes from time sealed a 2–1 victory. After going behind to league leaders Newport County in the fifth minute through Ryan Haynes' curling effort, Crawley equalised through a Mickey Demetriou headed own goal in the 32nd minute. Tarryn Allarakhia was sent off in the 59th minute for a challenge on Liam Shephard, though Crawley held on to a 1–1 draw. Crawley opened the scoring at home to second-placed Forest Green Rovers through Nichols in the 16th minute after a pass from Hessenthaler. Forest Green were level in the 51st minute through substitute Jake Young's 'swerving free-kick', though Crawley won it in the 79th minute through Nichols' 10th goal of the season.

=== January ===
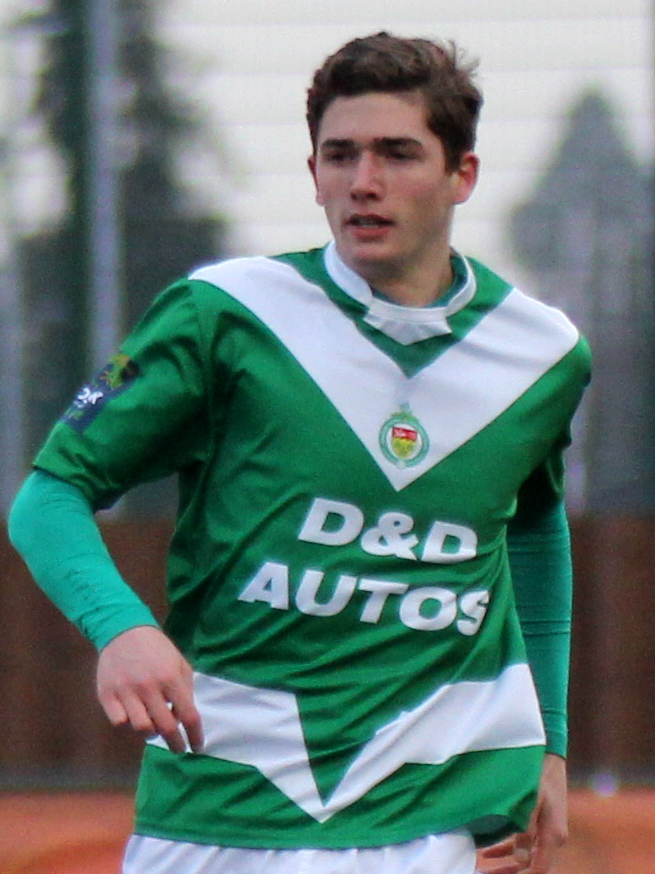
Despite only playing for the club between October 2020 and January 2021, Max Watters (pictured in 2018) ended the season as the club's top goalscorer

Crawley beat Bolton Wanderers 1–0 away, having taken the lead in the 61st minute through a Francomb finish assisted by Nichols, before Reiss Greenidge was sent off in added time for Bolton. Josh Wright, brother of Mark, signed for the club on a two-and-a-half-year deal, following his release from Leyton Orient. Crawley progressed to the fourth round of the FA Cup after defeating Premier League side Leeds United 3–0. After a goalless first-half, Crawley took the lead in the 50th minute after Tsaroulla finished into the bottom right corner after a 'twisting run into the area'. Crawley doubled their lead six minutes later when Nadesan's strike beat Leeds keeper Kiko Casilla at his near post, before Tunnicliffe scored Crawley's final goal from close range in the 70th minute. The match against Bradford City was postponed due to snow and ice surrounding the ground, and following an outbreak of COVID-19 within Crawley Town's squad, their match against Stevenage was postponed. Crawley signed midfielders James Tilley and Jordan Maguire-Drew as well as forward Davide Rodari; Tilley signed for the club following his release from Grimsby Town, Maguire drew on loan from Leyton Orient and Rodari from Isthmian League side Hastings United for an undisclosed fee. Top scorer Max Watters left the club, signing for Championship side Cardiff City for an undisclosed fee. Their next match came on 26 January 2021 where they lost 2–1 away to AFC Bournemouth and were eliminated from the FA Cup. Jack Wilshere scored the opening goal for Bournemouth with a shot from 20 yards after 24 minutes. Nichols equalised from close range in the 59th minute before Josh King scored Bournemouth's winner. Nathan Ferguson signed for fellow League Two side Southend United for an undisclosed fee. Crawley lost 3–1 away to Cambridge United; Cambridge opened the scoring through Joe Ironside in the 11th minute before Hessenthaler equalised three minutes later after a pull-back from Nichols. Kyle Knoyle put Cambridge back in the lead in first half added time before Wes Hoolahan scored Cambridge's third in the 85th minute.

=== February ===
Josh Doherty joined Colchester United on loan until the end of the season on 1 February. Crawley were awarded a penalty in the third minute against Leyton Orient, though Nichols hit the crossbar. Orient midfielder Hector Kyprianou was sent off in the 30th minute for a challenge on Hessenthaler, though the match finished as a 0–0 draw. Crawley were 3–0 down at half-time at home to Harrogate Town following goals from Aaron Martin, Josh March and Simon Power. Crawley got a goal back through Dallison in the 53rd minute before Will Smith was sent off for a foul on Nichols in the 67th minute, with the match finishing 3–1 to the away side. Crawley were defeated 1–0 at home to Stevenage with Elliott List scoring the opening goal from the edge on the penalty area in the 83rd minute, before Nichols had a penalty saved for Crawley. Crawley defeated Colchester United 1–0 at home, with substitute Tilley scoring the only goal of the game in second-half stoppage time. Crawley lost 2–1 away to Grimsby Town, who were bottom of the league at kick-off. Former Crawley midfielder Morais scored Grimsby's opening goal before Powell equalised directly from a free-kick in the 30th minute. Joe Adams regained the lead for Grimsby with 11 minutes remaining before Grimsby's Joe Bunney was dismissed for a second bookable offence in added time. Crawley beat Exeter City 2–0 at home; after Tom Parkes was sent off for a foul on Tsaroulla early in the second half, Nichols converted a 62nd-minute penalty to put Crawley 1–0 ahead, after Tsaroulla had been fouled in the box. Nadesan then scored from close range from a Nichols cross in the 83rd-minute.

=== March ===
Cole Stockton opened the scoring for Morecambe after 5 minutes following a long ball before Nadesan equalised with a "cool finish" eight minutes later. However, two second-half goals from Carlos Mendes Gomes saw Crawley defeated 3–1 away at Morecambe. Forward Sam Ashford joined Woking on loan until the end of the season. Crawley won 1–0 away at Tranmere following a back-heeled goal from Nichols in the 58th-minute. A 21st-minute Nichols goal saw Crawley defeat Salford City 1–0 at home. Crawley defeated Mansfield Town 1–0 at home following a goal from Tilley in the second minute of second-half added time. Crawley went 1–0 down to Walsall in the 55th-minute after Emmanuel Osadebe converted a penalty conceded by Tunnicliffe, though Nichols equalised in the 97th-minute after converting the second penalty of the match, awarded after Tunnicliffe was "flattened" by goalkeeper Liam Roberts. Crawley went a goal behind away to Barrow in the 9th-minute following a goal from Tom Davies before Francomb equalised in the 31st minute. Scott Quigley restored Barrow's lead five minutes later from the penalty spot following a foul from Craig on Bobby Thomas. Jack Powell equalised for Crawley with a header in the 84th-minute before Quigley won the game for Barrow with a long-range goal in the fifth minute of added time. Crawley lost 3–1 at home to Port Vale; Tom Conlon scored the opening goal for the away side from the edge of the box in the 12th-minute before Nadesan equalised for the hosts with a headed goal in the 45th-minute. However, two second half goals from Nathan Smith and David Worrall secured a 3–1 win for the away side. Crawley were defeated 2–0 away to Carlisle United following two first-half goals from Joe Riley and Omari Patrick.

=== April ===
Crawley drew 0–0 with Scunthorpe United in what was described as a "dire draw". Oldham Athletic led Crawley 2–0 at half-time following goals from Conor McAleny and Cameron Borthwick-Jackson, and extended their lead to 3–0 with a second goal for McAleny in the 47th-minute. Tilley got a goal back for Crawley in the 90th-minute following a corner before Dylan Bahamboula scored Oldham's fourth in the fifth-minute of added time from close range. The club drew 0–0 away to Southend United on 10 April 2021. Crawley took the lead over Bradford City in the 20th-minute with a headed goal from Tunnicliffe, before Joe McNerney scored their second with another headed goal in the 86th-minute. Maguire-Drew scored the only goal of the game with a 77th-minute shot off the post in a victory over Cheltenham Town. Crawley lost 2–0 to Newport County on 20 April 2021; the club went 1–0 down through a Liam Shephard goal after 52 minutes before Tom Nichols was sent off for Crawley in the 89th-minute after catching Shephard with his elbow. Newport scored their second through Aaron Lewis in the tenth minute of added time. Crawley drew 0–0 at home to Forest Green Rovers as the visiting side "failed to take advantage of plenty of chances".

=== May ===
Crawley went 1–0 down to Stevenage in the 21st-minute via a Luke Norris penalty before Francomb equalised from a corner three minutes later. Norris restored Stevenage's lead in the 74th-minute before Terence Vancooten's own goal five minutes later levelled the score. Arthur Read scored again to put Stevenage ahead for the third tine in the 81st-minute, though Powell equalised again for Crawley in the 92nd-minute with a "stunning" goal from 20 yards. Crawley lost 4–1 at home to Bolton Wanderers in the final match of the season as the visitors were promoted to League One. Antoni Sarcevic scored the opening goal for the visiting side in the 9th-minute, before Oladapo Afolayan doubled their lead 17 minutes later. Francomb was sent off for Crawley in the 32nd-minute for a second bookable offence. Eoin Doyle and Lloyd Isgrove scored second-half goals for Bolton before Rodari scored a consolation for Crawley in the 89th-minute.

== Competitions ==
=== League Two ===
==== League table ====
Pos	Team	Pld	W	D	L	GF	GA	GD	Pts
8	Salford City	46	19	14	13	54	34	+20	71
9	Exeter City	46	18	16	12	71	50	+21	70
10	Carlisle United	46	18	12	16	60	51	+9	66
11	Leyton Orient	46	17	10	19	53	55	−2	61
12	Crawley Town	46	16	13	17	56	62	−6	61
13	Port Vale	46	17	9	20	57	57	0	60
14	Stevenage	46	14	18	14	41	41	0	60
15	Bradford City	46	16	11	19	48	53	−5	59
16	Mansfield Town	46	13	19	14	57	55	+2	58

Updated to match(es) played on 31 May 2021. Source: EFL Official Website
Rules for classification: 1) Points; 2) Goal difference; 3) Number of goals scored; 4) Head-to-head results; 5) Wins; 6) Away goals; 7) Penalty points (sec 9.5); 8) 12-point sending off offences

==== Results summary ====
Overall								Home						Away					
Pld	W	D	L	GF	GA	GD	Pts	W	D	L	GF	GA	GD	W	D	L	GF	GA	GD
46	16	13	17	56	62	−6	61	10	6	7	30	27	+3	6	7	10	26	35	−9

Last updated: 8 May 2021.
Source: BBC

==== Results by matchday ====
Matchday	1	2	3	4	5	6	7	8	9	10	11	12	13	14	15	16	17	18	19	20	21	22	23	24	25	26	27	28	29	30	31	32	33	34	35	36	37	38	39	40	41	42	43	44	45	46
Ground	A	H	A	H	A	H	A	A	H	H	A	A	H	H	A	A	H	H	A	H	A	A	A	H	H	H	H	A	H	A	A	H	H	H	A	H	A	A	H	A	A	H	A	H	A	H
Result	L	W	W	D	L	W	L	D	W	W	L	D	L	L	D	D	W	D	W	D	W	W	L	D	L	L	W	L	W	L	W	W	W	D	L	L	L	D	L	D	W	W	L	D	D	L
Position	22	13	4	7	13	9	12	13	9	7	8	9	12	15	13	15	13	13	11	10	9	6	12	11	11	14	12	14	13	14	12	11	10	10	10	11	12	13	14	15	13	12	12	13	12	12

Updated to match(es) played on 8 May 2021. Source: 11v11 for league tables and fixtures
A = Away; H = Home; W = Win; D = Draw; L = Loss

==== Matches ====
The League Two fixtures were announced on 21 August 2020, with Crawley's first fixture being away to Port Vale.

Win	Draw	Loss

Date	Time	Opponent	Venue	Result F–A	Scorers	Attendance	Referee	Ref.
12 September 2020	15:00	Port Vale	Away	0–2	—	0	Allison	
19 September 2020	15:00	Scunthorpe United	Home	1–0	Nichols 15'	0	Brook	
26 September 2020	15:00	Oldham Athletic	Away	3–2	Nadesan 31', Francomb 39', Nichols 69'	0	Drysdale	
3 October 2020	15:00	Southend United	Home	1–1	Nadesan 21'	0	Huxtable	
10 October 2020	15:00	Cheltenham Town	Away	0–2	—	0	Kettle	
17 October 2020	15:00	Morecambe	Home	4–0	Francomb 52', Watters 67', 71', Frost 77'	0	Busby	
20 October 2020	19:00	Exeter City	Away	1–2	Watters 40'	0	Finnie	
24 October 2020	15:00	Salford City	Away	1–1	Francomb 72'	0	Haines	
27 October 2020	18:30	Tranmere Rovers	Home	4–0	Watters 13', Nichols 21', Tunnicliffe 24', Frost 77'	0	Oldham	
31 October 2020	15:00	Cambridge United	Home	2–1	Watters 44', Nichols 56'	0	Bell	
3 November 2020	19:00	Walsall	Away	0–1	—	0	Barrott	
14 November 2020	15:00	Harrogate Town	Away	1–1	Watters 27'	0	Coy	
21 November 2020	13:30	Carlisle United	Home	0–3	—	0	Coggins	
24 November 2020	19:00	Grimsby Town	Home	1–2	Watters 4'	0	Johnson	
1 December 2020	19:00	Colchester United	Away	1–1	Tunnicliffe 20'	0	Huxtable	
5 December 2020	15:00	Mansfield Town	Away	3–3	Watters 49' 59', Dallison 54'	0	Sarginson	
12 December 2020	15:00	Barrow	Home	4–2	Watters 23', 58', 90', Nichols 81' (pen.)	650	Hair	
15 December 2020	19:45	Bradford City	Home	1–1	Pritchard 25' (o.g.)	1,149	Purkiss	
19 December 2020	15:00	Leyton Orient	Away	2–1	Coulson 15' (o.g.), Watters 82'	0	Oldham	
26 December 2020	15:00	Newport County	Home	1–1	Demetriou 32' (o.g.)	0	Rock	
29 December 2020	19:00	Forest Green Rovers	Away	2–1	Nichols 16', 79'	0	Linington	
2 January 2021	15:00	Bolton Wanderers	Away	1–0	Francomb 61'	0	Barrott	
30 January 2021	15:00	Cambridge United	Away	1–3	Hessenthaler 14'	0	Busby	
2 February 2021	19:00	Leyton Orient	Home	0–0	—	0	Johnson	
6 February 2021	15:00	Harrogate Town	Home	1–3	Dallison 53'	0	Whitestone	
16 February 2021	19:00	Stevenage	Home	0–1	—	0	Brook	
20 February 2021	15:00	Colchester United	Home	1–0	Tilley 90+3'	0	Nield	
23 February 2021	19:00	Grimsby Town	Away	1–2	Powell 30'	0	Madley	
27 February 2021	13:00	Exeter City	Home	2–0	Nichols 62' (pen.), Nadesan 83'	0	Bourne	
2 March 2021	18:30	Morecambe	Away	1–3	Nadesan 13'	0	Langford	
6 March 2021	15:00	Tranmere Rovers	Away	1–0	Nichols 58'	0	Pollard	
9 March 2021	19:00	Salford City	Home	1–0	Nichols 21'	0	Allison	
13 March 2021	15:00	Mansfield Town	Home	1–0	Tilley 90+2'	0	Bramall	
13 March 2021	19:00	Walsall	Home	1–1	Nichols 90+7' (pen.)	0	Robinson	
20 March 2021	15:00	Barrow	Away	2–3	Francomb 31', Powell 84'	0	Oldham	
27 March 2021	15:00	Port Vale	Home	1–3	Nadesan 45'	0	Sarginson	
30 March 2021	15:00	Carlisle United	Away	0–2	—	0	Lewis	
2 April 2021	13:00	Scunthorpe United	Away	0–0	—	0	Haines	
5 April 2021	15:00	Oldham Athletic	Home	1–4	Tilley 90'	0	Adcock	
10 April 2021	15:00	Southend United	Away	0–0	—	0	Breakspear	
13 April 2021	19:00	Bradford City	Away	2–0	Tunnicliffe 20', McNerney 86'	0	Coy	
16 April 2021	18:30	Cheltenham Town	Home	1–0	Maguire-Drew 77'	0	Purkiss	
20 April 2021	19:00	Newport County	Away	0–2	—	0	Young	
24 April 2021	15:00	Forest Green Rovers	Home	0–0	—	0	Smith	
1 May 2021	15:00	Stevenage	Away	3–3	Francomb 24', Vancooten 79' (o.g.), Powell 90+2'	0	Bourne	
8 May 2021	15:00	Bolton Wanderers	Home	1–4	Rodari 89'	0	Madley	

=== FA Cup ===
The draw for the first round was made on Monday 26 October, with Crawley drawn away to National League side Torquay United. The second round draw was revealed on Monday, 9 November by Danny Cowley. The third round draw was made on 30 November, with Premier League and EFL Championship clubs all entering the competition. The draw for the fourth and fifth round were made on 11 January, conducted by Peter Crouch.

Win	Draw	Loss

Round	Date	Time	Opponent	Venue	Result F–A	Scorers	Attendance	Referee	Ref.
First round	8 November 2020	12:45	Torquay United	Away	6–5 (a.e.t.)	Nichols 83' (pen.), 108', 113', Watters 90+11', Tunnicliffe 90+21', Nadesan 118'	0	Breakspear	
Second round	29 November 2020	13:30	AFC Wimbledon	Away	2–1	Nadesan 30', Watters 50'	0	Lewis	
Third round	10 January 2021	13:30	Leeds United	Home	3–0	Tsaroulla 50', Nadesan 53', Tunnicliffe 70'	0	Bankes	
Fourth round	26 January 2021	19:00	Bournemouth	Away	1–2	Nichols 59'	0	Marriner	

=== EFL Cup ===
The first round draw was made live on Sky Sports on 18 August 2020, with Crawley being drawn at home to Championship side Millwall, with the match set to be played on 5 September 2020.

Win	Draw	Loss

Round	Date	Time	Opponent	Venue	Result F–A	Scorers	Attendance	Referee	Ref.
First round	5 September 2020	13:00	Millwall	Home	1–3	Ashford 33'	0	Rock	

=== EFL Trophy ===
The regional group stage draw was confirmed on 18 August 2020, with Crawley being drawn in the same group as Ipswich Town, Gillingham and Arsenal U23.

==== Group stage ====
Pos	Div	Team	Pld	W	PW	PL	L	GF	GA	GD	Pts	Qualification
1	ACA	Arsenal U21	3	2	1	0	0	5	3	+2	8	Advance to Round 2
2	L1	Gillingham	3	1	0	1	1	3	4	−1	4	Advance to Round 2
3	L2	Crawley Town	3	1	0	0	2	4	4	0	3	
4	L1	Ipswich Town	3	1	0	0	2	3	4	−1	3	

Source: EFL.com

Win	Draw	Loss

Date	Time	Opponent	Venue	Result F–A	Scorers	Attendance	Referee	Ref.
8 September 2020	17:30	Gillingham	Away	1–2	Ferguson 78'	0	Whitton	
13 October 2020	19:45	Arsenal U21	Home	1–2	Watters 37'	0	Young	
10 November 2020	19:00	Ipswich Town	Home	2–0	Galach 17', 55'	0	Purkiss	

== Transfers ==
=== Transfers in ===
Date	Position	Name	Previous club (Note: Brackets around club names denote the player's contract with that club had expired before he joined Crawley)	Fee	Ref.
1 July 2020	FW	Sam Ashford	(Hemel Hempstead Town)	Free transfer	
1 August 2020	MF	Samuel Matthews	(Bristol Rovers)	Free transfer	
1 August 2020	MF	Zaid Al-Hussaini	(Staines Town)	Free transfer	
1 August 2020	MF	Tyler Frost	(Reading)	Free transfer	
1 August 2020	DF	Archie Davies	(Brighton & Hove Albion)	Free transfer	
1 August 2020	DF	Tony Craig	(Bristol Rovers)	Free transfer	
1 September 2020	MF	Jake Hessenthaler	(Grimsby Town)	Free transfer	
7 September 2020	FW	Tom Nichols	(Bristol Rovers)	Free transfer	
10 October 2020	FW	Max Watters	(Doncaster Rovers)	Free transfer	
10 October 2020	DF	Nick Tsaroulla	(Brentford B)	Free transfer	
13 October 2020	MF	Henry Burnett	(Southend United)	Free transfer	
7 November 2020	GK	Stuart Nelson	(Yeovil Town)	Free transfer	
14 December 2020	DF	Mark Wright	Free agent	—N/a	
8 January 2021	MF	Josh Wright	(Leyton Orient)	Free transfer	
15 January 2021	MF	James Tilley	(Grimsby Town)	Free transfer	
25 January 2021	FW	Davide Rodari	Hastings United	Undisclosed	

=== Transfers out ===
Date	Position	Name	Subsequent club (Note: Brackets around club names denote the player joined that club after his contract with Crawley expired)	Fee	Ref.
1 July 2020	MF	Jimmy Smith	(Yeovil Town)	Released	
1 July 2020	FW	Ibrahim Meite	( (Republic of Ireland) Derry City)	Released	
1 July 2020	MF	Josh Payne	(Ebbsfleet United)	Released	
1 July 2020	DF	Jamie Sendles-White	(Aldershot Town)	Released	
1 July 2020	FW	Ollie Palmer	(AFC Wimbledon)	Released	
1 July 2020	MF	Panutche Camará	(Plymouth Argyle)	Compensation	
1 September 2020	FW	Beryly Lubala	Blackpool	Undisclosed	
2 September 2020	FW	Gyliano van Velzen	( (Netherlands) Telstar)	Mutual consent	
5 October 2020	MF	Ashley Nathaniel-George	Southend United	Undisclosed	
6 October 2020	MF	Filipe Morais	(Grimsby Town)	Mutual consent	
16 January 2021	FW	Max Watters	Cardiff City	Undisclosed	
28 January 2021	MF	Nathan Ferguson	Southend United	Undisclosed	
11 February 2021	FW	Brian Galach	Unattached	Mutual consent	

=== Loans in ===
Date	Position	Name	Club	Return	Ref.
2 September 2020	GK	Tom McGill	Brighton & Hove Albion	12 January 2021	
16 October 2020	MF	Jake Hesketh	Southampton	End of season	
18 January 2021	MF	Jordan Maguire-Drew	Leyton Orient	End of season	

=== Loans out ===
Date	Position	Name	Club	Return	Ref.
4 December 2020	MF	Zaid Al-Hussaini	Weymouth	January 2021	
1 February 2021	DF	Josh Doherty	Colchester United	End of season	
5 March 2021	FW	Sam Ashford	Woking	End of season	

== Player statistics ==
=== First-team squad ===
As of 6 February 2021

Note: Flags indicate national team as has been defined under FIFA eligibility rules. Players may hold more than one non-FIFA nationality.

No.	Name	Nat.	Date of birth (Age) (Note: Players' ages as of 5 September 2020)	Year signed	Apps	Goals	Notes
Goalkeepers
1	Glenn Morris	ENG	20 December 1983 (aged 36)	2016	200	0	
37	Stuart Nelson	ENG	17 September 1981 (aged 38)	2020	3	0	
Defenders
2	Lewis Young	ENG	27 September 1989 (aged 30)	2014	240	5	
5	Joe McNerney	ENG	24 January 1990 (aged 30)	2015	121	6	
6	Tom Dallison	ENG	2 February 1996 (aged 24)	2019	66	3	
15	Archie Davies	ENG	7 October 1998 (aged 21)	2020	20	0	
17	Emmanuel Adebowale	ENG	19 September 1997 (aged 22)	2019	6	0	
24	Tony Craig	ENG	20 April 1985 (aged 35)	2020	29	0	
25	Nick Tsaroulla	CYP	29 March 1999 (aged 21)	2020	8	1	
30	Mark Wright	ENG	29 January 1987 (aged 33)	2020	1	0	
19	Jordan Tunnicliffe	ENG	23 October 1993 (aged 26)	2019	72	5	
Midfielders
4	George Francomb	ENG	8 September 1991 (aged 28)	2018	84	4	
7	Reece Grego-Cox	IRL	12 November 1994 (aged 25)	2018	67	8	
8	Jack Powell	ENG	29 January 1994 (aged 26)	2019	36	0	
11	Tyler Frost	ENG	7 July 1999 (aged 21)	2020	22	2	
18	David Sesay	ENG	18 September 1998 (aged 21)	2018	64	0	
20	Samuel Matthews	ENG	10 March 1997 (aged 23)	2020	21	1	
21	Dannie Bulman	ENG	24 January 1979 (aged 41)	2017	394	14	
27	Rafiq Khaleel	ENG	24 February 2003 (aged 17)	2020	2	0	
29	Jake Hesketh	ENG	27 March 1996 (aged 24)	2020	6	0	on loan from Southampton
33	Henry Burnett	ENG	1 September 1997 (aged 23)	2020	1	0	
39	Jake Hessenthaler	ENG	24 April 1994 (aged 26)	2020	30	1	
44	Josh Wright	ENG	6 November 1989 (aged 30)	2020	9	0	
22	Zaid Al-Hussaini	ENG	7 June 2000 (aged 20)	2020	2	0	
	Szymon Kowalczyk	POL	7 June 2003 (aged 17)	2020	0	0	
Forwards
9	Ricky German	GRN	13 January 1999 (aged 21)	2018	19	1	
10	Ashley Nadesan	ENG	9 September 1994 (aged 25)	2019	56	12	
14	Tarryn Allarakhia	ENG	17 October 1997 (aged 22)	2018	49	0	
16	Tom Nichols	ENG	28 August 1993 (aged 27)	2020	28	11	
23	Sam Ashford	ENG	21 December 1995 (aged 24)	2020	13	1	
26	Brian Galach	POL	16 May 2001 (aged 19)	2018	8	2	
38	James Tilley	ENG	13 June 1998 (aged 22)	2021	2	0	
34	Jordan Maguire-Drew	ENG	19 September 1997 (aged 22)	2021	2	0	on loan from Leyton Orient
35	Davide Rodari	ITA	13 June 1998 (aged 22)	2021	3	0	
Left club during season
29	Ashley Nathaniel-George	ENG	14 June 1995 (aged 25)	2018	57	11	
32	Tom McGill	ENG	14 June 1995 (aged 25)	2020	5	0	on loan from Brighton & Hove Albion
36	Max Watters	ENG	23 March 1998 (aged 22)	2020	19	16	
12	Nathan Ferguson	ENG	12 October 1995 (aged 24)	2019	52	7	
3	Josh Doherty	NIR	15 March 1996 (aged 24)	2017	93	0	loaned to Colchester

=== Appearances and goals ===
No.	Pos	Nat	Player	Total		League Two		FA Cup		EFL Cup		EFL Trophy	
No.	Pos	Nat	Player	Apps	Goals	Apps	Goals	Apps	Goals	Apps	Goals	Apps	Goals
1	GK	(England) ENG	Glenn Morris	48	0	45	0	3	0	0	0	0	0
3	DF	(Northern Ireland) NIR	Josh Doherty	18	0	14+1	0	1+1	0	0	0	1	0
4	MF	(England) ENG	George Francomb	35	6	32+1	6	1	0	0	0	1	0
5	DF	(England) ENG	Joe McNerney	31	1	23+3	1	1	0	1	0	3	0
6	DF	(England) ENG	Tom Dallison	20	2	12+2	2	3	0	1	0	2	0
8	MF	(England) ENG	Jack Powell	50	3	40+4	3	4	0	1	0	1	0
9	FW	(Grenada) GRN	Ricky German	7	0	1+3	0	0	0	0+1	0	2	0
10	FW	(England) ENG	Ashley Nadesan	46	8	30+10	5	4	3	1	0	1	0
11	MF	(England) ENG	Tyler Frost	27	2	10+13	2	1+1	0	1	0	0+1	0
12	MF	(England) ENG	Nathan Ferguson	13	1	4+5	0	0	0	1	0	3	1
14	FW	(England) ENG	Tarryn Allarakhia	20	0	8+9	0	0+1	0	0	0	2	0
15	DF	(England) ENG	Archie Davies	38	0	18+16	0	1+1	0	0	0	2	0
16	FW	(England) ENG	Tom Nichols	46	15	42+1	11	3	4	0	0	0	0
17	DF	(England) ENG	Emmanuel Adebowale	5	0	1	0	1	0	0	0	3	0
18	MF	(England) ENG	David Sesay	18	0	5+8	0	1+1	0	0+1	0	2	0
19	DF	(England) ENG	Jordan Tunnicliffe	45	5	39	3	4	2	1	0	1	0
20	MF	(England) ENG	Samuel Matthews	33	1	21+9	1	2	0	0	0	1	0
21	MF	(England) ENG	Dannie Bulman	9	0	4+2	0	2	0	1	0	0	0
22	MF	(England) ENG	Zaid Al-Hussaini	2	0	0	0	0	0	0	0	0+2	0
23	FW	(England) ENG	Sam Ashford	14	1	2+6	0	0+2	0	1	1	1+2	0
24	DF	(England) ENG	Tony Craig	42	0	36+2	0	3	0	1	0	0	0
25	DF	(Cyprus) CYP	Nick Tsaroulla	21	1	14+3	0	3	1	0	0	0+1	0
26	FW	(Poland) POL	Brian Galach	3	2	0	0	0	0	0+1	0	2	2
27	MF	(England) ENG	Rafiq Khaleel	2	0	0	0	0	0	0	0	1+1	0
29	MF	(England) ENG	Jake Hesketh	15	0	11+4	0	0	0	0	0	0	0
30	DF	(England) ENG	Mark Wright	2	0	1	0	0+1	0	0	0	0	0
32	GK	(England) ENG	Tom McGill	5	0	0+1	0	1	0	1	0	2	0
33	MF	(England) ENG	Henry Burnett	1	0	0	0	0	0	0	0	0+1	0
34	MF	(England) ENG	Jordan Maguire-Drew	17	1	14+3	1	0	0	0	0	0	0
35	FW	(Switzerland) SUI	Davide Rodari	13	1	1+11	1	0+1	0	0	0	0	0
36	FW	(England) ENG	Max Watters	19	16	12+3	13	1+2	2	0	0	1	1
37	GK	(England) ENG	Stuart Nelson	3	0	1	0	0+1	0	0	0	1	0
38	MF	(England) ENG	James Tilley	18	3	8+10	3	0	0	0	0	0	0
39	MF	(England) ENG	Jake Hessenthaler	51	1	42+4	1	4	0	0	0	0+1	0
44	MF	(England) ENG	Josh Wright	22	0	15+5	0	0+2	0	0	0	0	0

- Last updated: end of season
- Source: Soccerbase
