= Davide Rodari =

Swiss footballer (born 1999)

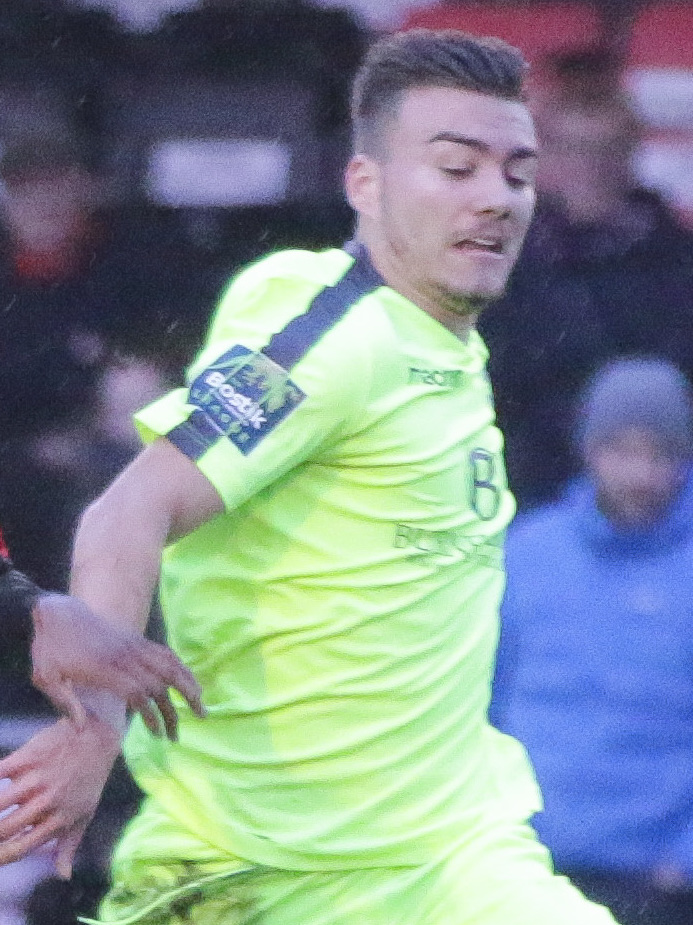
- Rodari with Hastings United in December 2017

Personal information
- Date of birth: 23 June 1999 (age 27)
- Place of birth: Switzerland
- Position: Forward

Team information
- Current team: Dagenham & Redbridge

Youth career
- Inter Milan
- Novara
- Pro Vercelli
- Lugano
- 2016–2017: Eastbourne Borough

Senior career*
Years	Team	Apps	(Gls)
2017–2021	Hastings United	69	(26)
2021–2023	Crawley Town	13	(1)
2022	→ Worthing (loan)	4	(3)
2022	→ Dorking Wanderers (loan)	8	(1)
2022–2023	→ Dartford (loan)	18	(3)
2023	→ Worthing (loan)	20	(5)
2023–2025	Hastings United	83	(46)
2025	Hampton & Richmond Borough	13	(4)
2025–2026	Sutton United	13	(1)
2026–	Dagenham & Redbridge	0	(0)
- * Club domestic league appearances and goals as of 18:44, 2 June 2026 (UTC)

Davide Rodari (born 23 June 1999) is a Swiss professional footballer who plays as a forward for National League South club Dagenham & Redbridge.

== Early life ==
Rodari was born in Switzerland and is of Dutch and Italian descent. He grew up in Novara, Italy. After moving to England, he studied Level 2 Fitness Instructing at East Sussex College in Hastings.

== Career ==
Rodari played youth football for Inter Milan, Novara and Pro Vercelli in Italy, and Lugano in Switzerland.

Rodari moved to England in 2016 to play youth football for Eastbourne Borough. He joined Hastings United in February 2017. He made his debut for Hastings on the opening day of the 2017–18 season in a 2–1 win over Corinthian-Casuals. In June 2018, Rodari signed a contract for the 2018–19 season with the option for a further year. He scored eight goals for Hastings United in a 12–3 Alan Turvey Trophy win over East Grinstead Town in November 2019. In April 2020, his contract was extended for the 2020–21 season.

On 25 January 2021, he signed for League Two club Crawley Town for an undisclosed fee on a two-and-a-half-year contract with the option for a further two years. He made his debut the following day as a substitute in a 2–1 FA Cup defeat away to AFC Bournemouth. He made 13 appearances for the club across the 2020–21 season, scoring once with Crawley's only goal of a 4–1 home defeat to Bolton Wanderers on the final day of the season.

On 10 February 2022, Rodari joined Isthmian League Premier Division side Worthing on loan for the remainder of the 2021–22 season. Having scored four goals in five games for the club however, Rodari was recalled and sent on loan to Dorking Wanderers to allow him to play at a higher level.

On 13 July 2022, Rodari joined Dartford on loan for an initial six–month period having impressed while on trial at the club during pre–season.

On 6 January 2023, Rodari left Dartford and immediately joined former-club Worthing on loan until the end of the 2022–23 season winning the Sussex Senior Cup.

On 20 May 2023, it was announced that Rodari would leave Crawley Town following the expiry of his contract.

In August 2023, Rodari returned to Isthmian League Premier Division club Hastings United.

On 22 May 2025, it was confirmed that Rodari had turned down Hastings United's new contract offer and would leave the club with immediate effect.

On 3 June 2025, it was announced that Rodari would join Hampton & Richmond Borough.

On 20 December 2025, Rodari signed for National League club Sutton United, the move reuniting him with former Hastings United manager Chris Agutter. He departed the club upon the expiry of his contract at the end of the 2025–26 season.

On 2 June 2026, Rodari joined National League South club Dagenham & Redbridge on a one-year deal.

== Career statistics ==
As of match played 26 April 2025

Appearances and goals by club, season and competition
Club	Season	League			FA Cup		EFL Cup		Other		Total	
Club	Season	Division	Apps	Goals	Apps	Goals	Apps	Goals	Apps	Goals	Apps	Goals
Hastings United	2017–18	Isthmian League Division One South	44	15	2	0	—		2 (Note: Two appearances in the FA Trophy)	0	48	15
Hastings United	2018–19	Isthmian League South Division	8	6	0	0	—		1 (Note: One appearance in the Isthmian League Division One South Play-Offs)	1	9	7
Hastings United	2019–20	Isthmian League South East Division	12	4	1	0	—		9 (Note: Four appearances and three goals in FA Trophy, four appearances and eleven goals in Alan Turvey Trophy, one appearance in Sussex Senior Challenge Cup)	14	22	18
Hastings United	2020–21	Isthmian League South East Division	5	1	2	0	—		3	0	10	1
Hastings United	Hastings United total		69	26	5	0	0	0	15	15	89	41
Crawley Town	2020–21	League Two	12	1	1	0	0	0	0	0	13	1
Crawley Town	2021–22	League Two	1	0	0	0	0	0	1 (Note: One appearance in the EFL Trophy)	0	2	0
Crawley Town	2022–23	League Two	0	0	0	0	0	0	0	0	0	0
Crawley Town	Crawley Town total		13	1	1	0	0	0	1	0	15	1
Worthing (loan)	2021–22	Isthmian Premier Division	4	3	—		—		1 (Note: One appearance and one goal in Sussex Senior Challenge Cup)	1	5	4
Dorking Wanderers (loan)	2021–22	National League South	8	1	—		—		—		8	1
Dartford (loan)	2022–23	National League South	18	3	1	0	—		2 (Note: One appearance in the London Senior Cup) (Note: One appearance in the FA Trophy)	0	21	3
Worthing (loan)	2022–23	National League South	20	5	—		—		2 (Note: Two appearances in the National League South play-offs)	1	22	6
Hastings United	2023–24	Isthmian League Premier Division	41	28	3	0	—		8 (Note: One appearance in the FA Trophy) (Note: Three appearances and one goal in the Velocity Cup) (Note: Four appearances and five goals in the Sussex Senior Cup)	6	52	34
Hastings United	2024–25	Isthmian League Premier Division	42	18	3	4	—		5 (Note: Two appearances in the FA Trophy) (Note: Two appearances and one goal in the Velocity Cup) (Note: One appearance and two goals in the Sussex Senior Cup)	3	50	25
Hastings United	Hastings United total		83	46	6	4	0	0	13	9	102	59
Hampton & Richmond Borough	2025–26	National League South	0	0	0	0	—		0	0	0	0
Career total			215	85	13	4	0	0	34	26	262	115
