= Zaid Al-Hussaini =

English footballer

Personal information
- Full name: Zaid Al-Hussaini
- Date of birth: 7 June 2000 (age 26)
- Place of birth: Chelsea, England
- Height: 5 ft 9 in (1.75 m)
- Position: Winger

Team information
- Current team: AFC Whyteleafe

Senior career*
Years	Team	Apps	(Gls)
–2017	Bedfont & Feltham		
2017	Chalfont St Peter	1	(0)
2018–2019	Derby County	0	(0)
2018	→ Gloucester City (loan)	2	(0)
2019	Potters Bar Town	2	(0)
2019	Hampton & Richmond Borough	0	(0)
2019	Staines Town	5	(0)
2020–2023	Crawley Town	0	(0)
2020–2021	→ Weymouth (loan)	3	(0)
2021–2022	→ Chelmsford City (loan)	3	(0)
2022	→ Chippenham Town (loan)	3	(0)
2022	→ Maidstone United (loan)	0	(0)
2023	Farnborough	2	(0)
2024	Chesham United	1	(0)
2024–2025	Witham Town	5	(0)
2025–2026	Herne Bay	21	(4)
2026	Aveley	2	(1)
2026–	AFC Whyteleafe	0	(0)

International career
- Iraq U19
- * Club domestic league appearances and goals as of 13:22, 5 September 2026 (UTC)

Zaid Al-Hussaini (Arabic: زيد الحسيني; born 7 June 2000) is a professional footballer who plays as a winger for AFC Whyteleafe. Born in England, he has represented Iraq at youth international level.

== Career ==
Al-Hussaini was born in Chelsea and grew up in Shepherd's Bush.

He joined Derby County in 2018, signing his first professional contract with the club, having previously played for the FFDTV Academy, Bedfont & Feltham and Chalfont St Peter. He joined Gloucester City on a one-month loan in November 2018, before leaving Derby County by mutual consent on 8 March 2019. He subsequently joined Potters Bar Town later that day. He made his debut for Potters Bar Town the following day, coming on as a substitute in a 1–0 home defeat to Carshalton Athletic. He joined Hampton & Richmond Borough at the start of the following season prior to a spell at Staines Town.

He joined League Two club Crawley Town on a three-year contract starting on 1 August 2020.

On 4 December 2020, Al-Hussaini joined National League club Weymouth on a month-long loan. He made his debut for Weymouth on 8 December 2020 in a 3–2 home defeat to Dagenham & Redbridge.

On 5 November 2021, Al-Hussaini signed for Chelmsford City on loan. The loan ended in January 2022. On 25 March 2022, Al-Hussaini joined Chippenham Town on loan until the end of the season. In November 2022 he joined Maidstone United on loan, but made no appearances before returning to Crawley.

He left Crawley by mutual consent on 27 February 2023.

On 14 March 2023, Al-Hussaini signed for Farnborough.

In November 2024, after playing for Chesham United, Al-Hussaini joined Witham Town.

In August 2026, having spent the 2025–26 season with Herne Bay, Al-Hussaini joined Isthmian League Premier Division club Aveley. The following month, he joined divisional rivals AFC Whyteleafe.

== International career ==
Born in England, Al-Hussaini is of Iraqi descent, having represented Iraq internationally at under-19 level.

== Career statistics ==
As of match played 22 August 2026

Appearances and goals by club, season and competition
Club	Season	League			FA Cup		EFL Cup		Other		Total	
Club	Season	Division	Apps	Goals	Apps	Goals	Apps	Goals	Apps	Goals	Apps	Goals
Bedfont & Feltham	2016–17	CCL Premier Division	No data currently available									
Chalfont St Peter	2017–18	Southern League Division One East	1	0	0	0	—		0	0	1	0
Derby County	2018–19	Championship	0	0	0	0	0	0	0	0	0	0
Gloucester City (loan)	2018–19	National League South	2	0	0	0	—		0	0	2	0
Potters Bar Town	2018–19	Isthmian League Premier Division	2	0	0	0	—		0	0	2	0
Hampton & Richmond Borough	2019–20	National League South	0	0	0	0	—		0	0	0	0
Staines Town	2019–20	Isthmian League South Central Division	5	0	0	0	—		1 (Note: Appearance(s) in Alan Turvey Trophy)	0	6	0
Crawley Town	2020–21	League Two	0	0	0	0	0	0	2 (Note: Appearance(s) in EFL Trophy)	0	2	0
Crawley Town	2021–22	League Two	0	0	0	0	0	0	0	0	0	0
Crawley Town	2022–23	League Two	0	0	0	0	0	0	1	0	1	0
Crawley Town	Total		0	0	0	0	0	0	3	0	3	0
Weymouth (loan)	2020–21	National League	3	0	0	0	—		1 (Note: Appearance in FA Trophy)	0	4	0
Chelmsford City (loan)	2021–22	National League South	3	0	0	0	—		1	0	4	0
Chippenham Town (loan)	2021–22	National League South	2	0	0	0	—		0	0	2	0
Maidstone United (loan)	2022–23	National League	0	0	0	0	—		0	0	0	0
Farnborough	2022–23	National League South	2	0	0	0	—		0	0	2	0
Chesham United	2023–24	Southern League Premier Division South	1	0	0	0	—		0	0	1	0
Witham Town	2024–25	Isthmian League North Division	5	0	0	0	—		0	0	5	0
Herne Bay	2025–26	Isthmian League South East Division	21	4	0	0	—		0	0	21	4
Aveley	2026–27	Isthmian League Premier Division	2	1	0	0	—		0	0	2	1
Career total			49	5	0	0	0	0	6	0	55	5
