= Archie Davies =

English footballer

- Davies with Yeovil Town in 2026

Personal information
- Full name: Archie Daniel Davies
- Date of birth: 7 October 1998 (age 28)
- Place of birth: St Leonards-on-Sea, England
- Height: 6 ft 0 in (1.83 m)
- Position: Defender

Team information
- Current team: Yeovil Town
- Number: 12

Youth career
- –2014: Crystal Palace
- 2014–2017: Brighton & Hove Albion

Senior career*
Years	Team	Apps	(Gls)
2017–2020	Brighton & Hove Albion	0	(0)
2017	→ Whitehawk (loan)	8	(0)
2020–2022	Crawley Town	67	(0)
2022–2023	Aldershot Town	28	(0)
2023–2024	Dundalk	57	(0)
2024–2026	Carlisle United	45	(1)
2026–	Yeovil Town	17	(2)
- * Club domestic league appearances and goals as of 22:33, 21 November 2026 (UTC)

Archie Daniel Davies (born 7 October 1998) is an English professional footballer who plays as a defender for Yeovil Town

He played youth football with Crystal Palace and Brighton & Hove Albion and had a loan spell from the latter at Whitehawk in 2017. His former clubs also include Crawley Town, Aldershot Town, Dundalk and Carlisle United.

== Career ==
=== Brighton & Hove Albion ===
Davies played youth football for Crystal Palace before joining Brighton & Hove Albion at the age of 15. He signed his first professional contract with the club in 2017.

Davies joined Whitehawk on loan in August 2017, and played a total 8 league games for them.

Davies made his professional debut for Brighton & Hove Albion, on 25 September 2019 in a 3–1 defeat at home against Aston Villa in the EFL Cup.

Davies was released by Brighton in the summer of 2020 upon the expiry of his contract.

=== Crawley Town ===
Davies signed for Crawley Town on 1 August 2020 following his release from Brighton. His first appearance for Crawley on 8 September 2020 in a 2–1 EFL Trophy defeat to Gillingham. He made his league debut for the club four days later in a 2–0 defeat to Port Vale. In total he made 38 appearances across the 2020–21 season.

On 10 August 2021, Davies scored his first senior goal with a 95th-minute equaliser in a 2–2 EFL Cup draw Gillingham. Crawley lost the penalty shoot-out despite Davies scoring his penalty. He made 37 appearances during 2021–22 season. Davies was released by Crawley in June 2022.

=== Aldershot Town ===
On 16 June 2022, it was announced that Davies had joined National League club Aldershot Town on a one-year contract.

=== Dundalk ===
On 26 January 2023, Davies signed a two-year contract with League of Ireland Premier Division club Dundalk.

=== Carlisle United ===
On 9 July 2024, Davies signed for EFL League Two side Carlisle United for an undisclosed fee. On 9 May 2026, the club announced it would be releasing the player.

=== Yeovil Town ===
On 10 June 2026, Davies joined fellow National League club Yeovil Town on a two-year deal.

== Personal life ==
Davies was born in St Leonards-on-Sea and grew up in St Leonards-on-Sea and Lanzarote before attending Buckswood School. He can speak Spanish.

== Career statistics ==
As of match played 21 November 2026

Appearances and goals by club, season and competition
Club	Season	League			National cup (Note: Includes FA Cup, FAI Cup)		League cup (Note: Includes EFL Cup)		Other		Total	
Club	Season	Division	Apps	Goals	Apps	Goals	Apps	Goals	Apps	Goals	Apps	Goals
Whitehawk (loan)	2017–18	National League South	8	0	0	0	—		0	0	8	0
Brighton & Hove Albion U21	2018–19	—			—		—		3 (Note: appearances in EFL Trophy)	0	3	0
Brighton & Hove Albion U21	2019–20	—			—		—		3	0	3	0
Brighton & Hove Albion	2019–20	Premier League	0	0	0	0	1	0	—		1	0
Crawley Town	2020–21	League Two	34	0	2	0	0	0	2	0	38	0
Crawley Town	2021–22	League Two	33	0	1	0	1	1	2	0	37	1
Crawley Town	Total		67	0	3	0	1	1	4	0	75	1
Aldershot Town	2022–23	National League	28	0	1	0	—		2 (Note: Appearances in FA Trophy)	0	31	0
Dundalk	2023	LOI Premier Division	35	0	3	0	—		5 (Note: 4 appearances in UEFA Europa Conference League & 1 appearance in Leinster Senior Cup)	0	43	0
Dundalk	2024	LOI Premier Division	22	0	—		—		2 (Note: Appearances in Leinster Senior Cup)	1	24	1
Dundalk	Total		57	0	3	0	—		7	1	67	1
Carlisle United	2024–25	League Two	19	1	0	0	1	0	0	0	20	1
Carlisle United	2025–26	National League	24	0	1	0	—		2	0	27	0
Carlisle United	Total		43	1	1	0	0	0	2	0	46	1
Yeovil Town	2026–27	National League	17	2	2	1	—		1 (Note: Appearance in Somerset Premier Cup)	0	20	3
Career total			220	3	10	1	3	1	22	1	255	6

== Honours ==
=== Individual ===
- PFAI Team of the Year: 2023
