= 2022–23 Mansfield Town F.C. season =

Mansfield Town FC
2022–23 season
- Owner: Carolyn & John Radford
- Chairman: David Sharpe
- Manager: Nigel Clough
- Stadium: Field Mill
- League Two: 8th
- FA Cup: Second round
- EFL Cup: First round
- EFL Trophy: Second round

The 2022–23 season is the 126th season in the existence of Mansfield Town Football Club and the club's tenth consecutive season in League Two. In addition to the league, they will also compete in the 2022–23 FA Cup, the 2022–23 EFL Cup and the 2022–23 EFL Trophy.

== Transfers ==
=== In ===
Date	Pos	Player	Transferred from	Fee	Ref
1 July 2022 (Note: The transfer was announced on 15 June, and would become official on July 1 when his Milton Keynes Dons contract expired)	CM	(England) Hiram Boateng	(England) Milton Keynes Dons	Free Transfer	
1 July 2022 (Note: The transfer was announced on 6 June, and would become official on July 1 when his Cheltenham Town contract expired)	GK	(England) Scott Flinders	(England) Cheltenham Town	Free Transfer	
4 August 2022	CM	(England) Anthony Hartigan	(England) AFC Wimbledon	Compensation	
16 November 2022	LB	(England) Lewis Page	(England) Harrogate Town	Free Transfer	
12 January 2023	CB	(England) Alfie Kilgour	(England) Bristol Rovers	Undisclosed	
13 January 2023	RB	(England) Callum Johnson	(Scotland) Ross County	Undisclosed	
15 January 2023	CM	(England) Louis Reed	(England) Swindon Town	Undisclosed	
31 January 2023	AM	(England) Davis Keillor-Dunn	(England) Burton Albion	Undisclosed	

=== Out ===
Date	Pos	Player	Transferred to	Fee	Ref
30 June 2022	LB	(Republic of Ireland) Ryan Burke	(Republic of Ireland) Bohemians	Released	
30 June 2022	CF	(England) Nathan Caine	(England) Stafford Rangers F.C.	Released	
30 June 2022	LB	(Republic of Ireland) Jaden Charles	(England) Nuneaton Borough	Released	
30 June 2022	CM	(England) Ethan Hill	(England) Kettering Town	Released	
30 June 2022	CB	(England) Farrend Rawson	(England) Morecambe	Released	
30 June 2022	CF	(England) Josh Scott	(England) Morpeth Town	Released	
30 June 2022	AM	(England) Tyrese Sinclair	(England) Rochdale	Released	
30 June 2022	GK	(Czech Republic) Marek Štěch	Unattached	Released	
30 June 2022	CM	(England) Keaton Ward	(England) Kettering Town	Released	
15 July 2022	FW	(England) Sha'mar Lawson	(England) Millwall	Free Transfer	
12 January 2023	CF	(England) Oliver Hawkins	(England) Gillingham	Undisclosed	
14 January 2023	CM	(England) George Lapslie	(England) Gillingham	Undisclosed	
31 January 2023	RB	(England) Kellan Gordon	(England) Crawley Town	Undisclosed	
2 March 2023	LB	(England) Lewis Page	(England) Gillingham	Free Transfer	

=== Loans in ===
Date	Pos	Player	Loaned from	On loan until	Ref
9 July 2022	CF	(England) Will Swan	(England) Nottingham Forest	End of Season	
12 July 2022	GK	(England) Christy Pym	(England) Peterborough United	End of Season	
16 July 2022	CB	(England) Riley Harbottle	(England) Nottingham Forest	End of Season	

=== Loans out ===
Date	Pos	Player	Loaned to	On loan until	Ref
23 July 2022	CF	(England) Danny Johnson	(England) Walsall	1 January 2023	

== Pre-season and friendlies ==
On June 9, the Stags confirmed their pre-season schedule, which included a training camp in Scotland. A behind-closed-doors friendly with Sheffield United was later added.

Win Draw Loss Fixtures

9 July 2022 Friendly	Retford United	0–6	Mansfield Town	Retford
15:00 BST		Report	Akins 10'; Bowery 26', 34'; Gale 30'; Quinn 31'; Oates 61'	Stadium: Cannon Park; Attendance: 912; Referee: Lee Hible

12 July 2022 Friendly	Matlock Town	0–1	Mansfield Town	Matlock
12:45 BST		Report	Boateng 26'	Stadium: The Proctor Cars Stadium; Attendance: 1,058; Referee: Jamie O'Connor

16 July 2022 Friendly	Mansfield Town	1–1	Rotherham United	Mansfield
15:00 BST	Oates 85'	Report	Kayode 60'	Stadium: One Call Stadium; Attendance: 2,440; Referee: Josh Smith

19 July 2022 Friendly	Mansfield Town	3–0	Sheffield United	Mansfield
19:00 BST	Boateng 65' (?); Oates 72'	Report		Stadium: One Call Stadium; Attendance: 0 (behind-closed-doors); Referee: Declan Bourne

23 July 2022 Friendly	Oldham Athletic	0–3	Mansfield Town	Oldham
15:00 BST		Report	Oates 38', 62'; Hawkins 88'	Stadium: Boundary Park; Attendance: 919

== Competitions ==
=== Overall record ===
Competition	First match	Last match	Starting round	Record							
Competition	First match	Last match	Starting round	Pld	W	D	L	GF	GA	GD	Win %
League Two	August 2022	May 2023	Matchday 1	0	0	0	0	0	0	+0	—
FA Cup	TBC	TBC	First round	0	0	0	0	0	0	+0	—
EFL Cup	TBC	TBC	First round	0	0	0	0	0	0	+0	—
EFL Trophy	TBC	TBC	Group stage	0	0	0	0	0	0	+0	—
Total				0	0	0	0	0	0	+0	—

Last updated: pre-season
Source: [ Soccerway]

=== League Two ===
==== League table ====
Pos	Team	Pld	W	D	L	GF	GA	GD	Pts	Promotion, qualification or relegation
5	Carlisle United (O, P)	46	20	16	10	66	43	+23	76	Qualification for League Two play-offs
6	Bradford City	46	20	16	10	61	43	+18	76	Qualification for League Two play-offs
7	Salford City	46	22	9	15	72	54	+18	75	Qualification for League Two play-offs
8	Mansfield Town	46	21	12	13	72	55	+17	75	
9	Barrow	46	18	8	20	47	53	−6	62	
10	Swindon Town	46	16	13	17	61	55	+6	61	
11	Grimsby Town	46	16	13	17	49	56	−7	61	

Source: EFL Official Website
Rules for classification: 1) Points; 2) Goal difference; 3) Number of goals scored; 4) Head-to-head results; 5) Wins; 6) Away goals; 7) Penalty points (sec 9.5); 8) 12-point sending off offences
(O) Play-off winners; (P) Promoted

==== Results summary ====
Overall								Home						Away					
Pld	W	D	L	GF	GA	GD	Pts	W	D	L	GF	GA	GD	W	D	L	GF	GA	GD
45	20	12	13	70	55	+15	72	9	8	6	37	31	+6	11	4	7	33	24	+9

Last updated: 29 April 2023.
Source: [ Soccerway]

==== Results by round ====
Round	1	2	3	4	5	6	7	8	9	10	11	12	13	14	15	16	17	18	19	20	21	22	23	24	25	26	27	28	29	30	31	32	33	34	35	36	37	38	39	40	41	42	43	44	45
Ground	A	H	A	H	H	A	A	H	A	A	H	A	H	A	H	H	H	A	A	H	A	H	A	A	H	H	H	A	H	A	A	H	A	A	A	H	H	H	A	H	A	A	H	H	H
Result	L	W	L	W	W	L	W	D	W	W	D	W	W	L	D	L	L	W	L	W	D	D	W	L	L	D	W	D	W	W	W	L	W	L	D	D	D	W	W	D	D	W	W	L	L
Position	22	13	17	10	8	8	7	8	7	6	7	5	4	4	4	9	9	7	8	7	5	6	6	7	9	9	7	6	6	5	5	7	8	8	8	8	8	8	7	8	7	8	8	8	8

Updated to match(es) played on 29 April 2023. Source: [ Soccerway]
A = Away; H = Home; W = Win; D = Draw; L = Loss; P = Postponed

==== Matches ====
Win Draw Loss Fixtures

On 23 June, the league fixtures were announced.

30 July 2022 1	Salford City	2–0	Mansfield Town	Salford
15:00 BST	Hendry 5'; Thomas-Asante 28'; Lowe (yellow card) 36'; King (yellow card) 69'	Report		Stadium: The Peninsula Stadium; Attendance: 2,721; Referee: Adam Herczeg

6 August 2022 2	Mansfield Town	1–0	Tranmere Rovers	Mansfield
15:00 BST	Harbottle 60'; Quinn (yellow card) 64'; Hawkins (yellow card) 64'	Report	Hemmings (yellow card) 41'	Stadium: One Call Stadium; Attendance: 7,128; Referee: Seb Stockbridge

13 August 2022 3	Leyton Orient	1–0	Mansfield Town	Leyton
15:00 BST	Hunt (yellow card) 27'; Kelman 63'; El Mizouni (yellow card) 66'; Brown (yellow card) 78'; Archibald (yellow card) 90+5'	Report	McLaughlin (penalty missed) 2', (yellow card) 90+3'; O'Toole (yellow card) 23'	Stadium: Breyer Group Stadium; Attendance: 6,328; Referee: Leigh Doughty

16 August 2022 4	Mansfield Town	5–2	AFC Wimbledon	Mansfield
19:45 BST	Oates 32' (pen.); Lapslie 40'; Quinn (yellow card) 45+1'; McLaughlin (yellow card) 45+3'; Maris 56'; Harbottle 70'; Swan 87'	Report	Davison 4', 16'; Marsh (yellow card) 28'; Currie (yellow card) 31'; Gunter (red card) 45'; Brown (yellow card) 45+4'; Ogundere (yellow card) 82'	Stadium: One Call Stadium; Attendance: 5,709; Referee: Ben Speedie

20 August 2022 5	Mansfield Town	2–1	Stockport County	Mansfield
15:00 BST	Clarke (yellow card) 5', (goal) 56'; Swan 55'	Report	Sarcevic 53'; Camps (yellow card) 70'	Stadium: One Call Stadium; Attendance: 6,924; Referee: Anthony Backhouse

27 August 2022 6	Sutton United	2–1	Mansfield Town	Sutton
15:00 BST	Rowe (yellow card) 15'; Kizzi (yellow card) 37'; Neufville 44'; Thomas (yellow card) 56'; Fadahunsi 82'	Report	O'Toole (yellow card) 28'; Quinn (yellow card) 68'; Hawkins 75'	Stadium: VBS Community Stadium; Attendance: 2,664; Referee: Lee Swabey

3 September 2022 7	Doncaster Rovers	1–3	Mansfield Town	Doncaster
15:00 BST	Tomlin 45+2', (yellow card) 66'	Report	Clarke 15', (yellow card) 86'; Maris 56'; Hawkins (yellow card) 61'; Akins 71' (pen.); Lapslie (yellow card) 83'	Stadium: Eco-Power Stadium; Attendance: 8,978; Referee: Thomas Kirk

13 September 2022 8	Mansfield Town	0–0	Carlisle United	Mansfield
19:45 BST	Maris (yellow card) 59'	Report	Gibson (yellow card) 60'; Mellish (yellow card) 69'; Moxon (yellow card) 87'	Stadium: One Call Stadium; Attendance: 5,421; Referee: Sam Allison

17 September 2022 9	Gillingham	0–2	Mansfield Town	Gillingham
15:00 BST	Gbode (yellow card) 78'	Report	Akins 17', (penalty missed) 29'; Lapslie 33'; Harbottle (yellow card) 66'	Stadium: MEMS Priestfield Stadium; Attendance: 4,195; Referee: Tom Reeves

24 September 2022 10	Crewe Alexandra	1–2	Mansfield Town	Crewe
15:00 BST	Leshabela (yellow card) 33'; Baker-Richardson 70'; Sambou (yellow card) 79'	Report	Clarke (yellow card) 38'; Quinn (yellow card) 64'; Swan 87'; Hawkins 90+3'	Stadium: Mornflake Stadium; Attendance: 4,942; Referee: Martin Woods

30 September 2022 11	Mansfield Town	2–2	Hartlepool United	Mansfield
19:45 BST	Maris (yellow card) 38'; Lapslie 51'; Harbottle 59'; Law (yellow card) 90+6'	Report	Umerah 62' 89' (yellow card) 90'	Stadium: One Call Stadium; Attendance: 6,891; Referee: Craig Hicks

8 October 2022 12	Barrow	0–1	Mansfield Town	Barrow-in-Furness
15:00 BST	White (yellow card) 73'	Report	Clarke (yellow card) 32'; Harbottle (yellow card) 34'; Bowery 50'; O'Toole (yellow card) 75'	Stadium: Furness Building Society Stadium; Attendance: 3,713; Referee: Tom Nield

15 October 2022 13	Mansfield Town	2–1	Walsall	Mansfield
13:00 BST	Lapslie 15'; Swan 82' (yellow card) 84'	Report	Bennett 35'	Stadium: One Call Stadium; Attendance: 6,821; Referee: Sam Purkiss

22 October 2022 14	Crawley Town	3–2	Mansfield Town	Crawley
15:00 BST	Nadesan 1', 46'; Nichols 13'; Johnson (yellow card) 29'; Tsaroulla (yellow card) 45+1'; Conroy (yellow card) 61'; Robson (yellow card) 88'	Report	Bowery 16' (pen.); Lapslie 27'; Quinn (yellow card) 90'	Stadium: Broadfield Stadium; Attendance: 2,802; Referee: Sunny Gill

25 October 2022 15	Mansfield Town	0–0	Newport County	Mansfield
19:45 BST	Perch (yellow card) 41' (yellow-red card) 59'	Report	Demetriou (yellow card) 57'; Moriah-Welsh (yellow card) 90+7'	Stadium: One Call Stadium; Attendance: 5,624; Referee: Sam Barrott

29 October 2022 16	Mansfield Town	2–5	Swindon Town	Mansfield
15:00 BST	Gordon 1'; Swan 30'; Boateng (yellow card) 31' (yellow-red card) 59'; Maris (yellow card) 38'; Pym (yellow card) 60'; O'Toole (yellow card) 70'	Report	Williams 7', 35' (yellow card) 72'; Jephcott 51' (yellow card) 77'; Darcy 68'; Gladwin 85' (pen.)	Stadium: One Call Stadium; Attendance: 6,804; Referee: Carl Brook

8 November 2022 17	Mansfield Town	1–2	Bradford City	Mansfield
19:45 GMT	Swan 69'; Quinn (yellow card) 78'; Lapslie (yellow card) 90+3'	Report	Platt (yellow card) 5' (yellow-red card) 65'; Smallwood 30' (yellow card) 90+5'; Cook 53'; Banks (yellow card) 81'	Stadium: One Call Stadium; Attendance: 7,650; Referee: Simon Mather

12 November 2022 18	Rochdale	0–1	Mansfield Town	Rochdale
15:00 GMT	Sinclair (yellow card) 35'; Seriki (yellow card) 82'; John (yellow card) 90+6'	Report	Perch (yellow card) 52'; Maris 66'; Hartigan (yellow card) 90+5'	Stadium: Spotland; Attendance: 3,631; Referee: Robert Lewis

19 November 2022 19	Harrogate Town	3–0	Mansfield Town	Harrogate
15:00 GMT	Falkingham (yellow card) 3'; Pattison 5'; Armstrong 19', 45+3'; Ramsay (yellow card) 49'; Mattock (yellow card) 58'	Report	O'Toole (yellow card) 26'; Wallace (yellow card) 29'	Stadium: The EnviroVent Stadium; Attendance: 2,421; Referee: Scott Oldham

3 December 2022 20	Mansfield Town	2–1	Colchester United	Mansfield
15:00 GMT	Hawkins (yellow card) 29'; Swan 34', (yellow card) 67'; Akins 90+2'	Report	Newby 10'; Chambers (yellow card) 85'; Dallison (yellow card) 90+4'	Stadium: One Call Stadium; Attendance: 5,918; Referee: Ross Joyce

10 December 2022 21	Stevenage	0–0	Mansfield Town	Stevenage
15:00 GMT	Piergianni (yellow card) 29'	Report		Stadium: Lamex Stadium; Attendance: 3,301; Referee: Anthony Backhouse

26 December 2022 22	Mansfield Town	1–1	Northampton Town	Mansfield
15:00 GMT	Harbottle (yellow card) 7'; Hawkins (yellow card) 9'; Swan 84'; Perch (yellow card) 90+3'	Report	Odimayo (yellow card) 57'; Hoskins 88'	Stadium: One Call Stadium; Attendance: 7,301; Referee: Ben Speedie

29 December 2022 23	Hartlepool United	1–2	Mansfield Town	Hartlepool
19:45 GMT	Hamilton 19'; Cooke (yellow card) 75'; Featherstone (yellow card) 82'	Report	Clarke (yellow card) 23'; Oates 47'; Hawkins 60'	Stadium: The Suit Direct Stadium; Attendance: 4,599; Referee: Martin Coy

1 January 2023 24	Walsall	2–1	Mansfield Town	Bescot
15:00 GMT	James-Taylor 43'; Kinsella 47'; Maddox (yellow card) 65'; Evans (yellow card) 82'	Report	Oates 82'	Stadium: Poundland Bescot Stadium; Attendance: 6,199; Referee: Charles Breakspear

7 January 2023 25	Mansfield Town	2–3	Barrow	Mansfield
15:00 GMT	McLaughlin 9'; Quinn 25'; Maris (yellow card) 64'	Report	Gotts (yellow card) 36'; Waters 45+1'; Gordon 49'; Ray (yellow card) 58'; Foley (yellow card) 74'; Hawkins 77' (o.g.)	Stadium: One Call Stadium; Attendance: 6,081; Referee: Will Finnie

14 January 2023 26	Mansfield Town	1–1	Crewe Alexandra	Mansfield
15:00 GMT	Maris 42', (red card) 81'; Oates (yellow card) 60'; Wallace (yellow card) 70'	Report	Thomas (yellow card) 27'; Mellor 55'	Stadium: One Call Stadium; Attendance: 6,142; Referee: Carl Boyeson

28 January 2023 27	Mansfield Town	4–1	Doncaster Rovers	Mansfield
15:00 GMT	Anderson 1' (o.g.); Kilgour 26'; Clarke (yellow card) 45+1'; Reed (yellow card) 56'; Akins 60'; Swan 86'	Report	Anderson (yellow card) 45+7'; Hurst 53'; Miller (yellow card) 90+5'	Stadium: One Call Stadium; Attendance: 8,116; Referee: Thomas Parsons

4 February 2023 28	Bradford City	1–1	Mansfield Town	Bradford
15:00 GMT	Cook 29', (yellow card) 71'	Report	Wallace (yellow card) 31'; Perch (yellow card) 59'; Bowery (yellow card) 84'; Kilgour 90+1'	Stadium: University of Bradford Stadium; Attendance: 18,755; Referee: Alan Young

11 February 2023 29	Mansfield Town	2–0	Gillingham	Mansfield
15:00 GMT	Clarke 21'; Akins 35' (pen.); Keillor-Dunn (yellow card) 62'; Maris (yellow card) 80'	Report	Tutonda (yellow card) 19'; Ehmer (yellow card) 34'; Lapslie (yellow card) 68'	Stadium: One Call Stadium; Attendance: 6,937; Referee: Thomas Kirk

14 February 2023 30	Carlisle United	0–4	Mansfield Town	Carlisle
19:45 GMT	Gordon (yellow card) 43'; Garner (yellow card) 58'; Harris (yellow card) 70'	Report	Clarke 14'; Kilgour 25'; Akins 29' (pen.); Hewitt 38'; Harbottle (yellow card) 55'	Stadium: Brunton Park; Attendance: 4,645 (212 Stags' fans); Referee: Ben Toner

18 February 2023 31	Tranmere Rovers	0–2	Mansfield Town	Birkenhead
15:00 GMT		Report	Harbottle 34', (yellow card) 62'; Keillor-Dunn 54'	Stadium: Prenton Park; Attendance: 6,282; Referee: Lee Swabey

25 February 2023 32	Mansfield Town	2–5	Salford City	Mansfield
15:00 GMT	Perch (yellow card) 13'; Keillor-Dunn 36'; Clarke (yellow card) 52'; Bowery (yellow card) 78', (goal) 88'; Johnson (yellow card) 83'	Report	Lund 18', 56'; Hendry 21'; Lowe (yellow card) 28'; Bolton 50'; Vassell 81'	Stadium: One Call Stadium; Attendance: 6,868 (115 Salford supporters); Referee: Marc Edwards

5 March 2023 33	AFC Wimbledon	1–3	Mansfield Town	Wimbledon
15:00 GMT	Al-Hamadi 25'; McAteer (yellow card) 57'	Report	Clarke (yellow card) 5'; Harbottle 30', (yellow card) 44'; Wallace (yellow card) 32'; Quinn (yellow card) 51'; Johnson 66'; Keillor-Dunn 77'	Stadium: Cherry Red Records Stadium; Attendance: 7,939 (905 Stags' fans); Referee: Ollie Yates

10 March 2023	Mansfield Town	Postponed	Leyton Orient	Mansfield
15:00 GMT				Stadium: One Call Stadium
Note: Fixture was postponed due to heavy snowfall and general safety concerns.

14 March 2023 34	Northampton Town	1–0	Mansfield Town	Northampton
19:45 GMT	Hoskins 28' (pen.); Haynes (yellow card) 66'	Report	Wallace (yellow card) 4'; Pym (yellow card) 27'; Quinn (red card) 66'; Law (yellow card) 88'	Stadium: Sixfields Stadium; Attendance: 6,301 (1,039 Stags' fans); Referee: Geoff Eltringham

18 March 2023 35	Stockport County	1–1	Mansfield Town	Edgeley
15:00 GMT	Madden 30'; Byrne (yellow card) 66'; Sarcevic (yellow card) 90+5'	Report	Akins 90+3'	Stadium: Edgeley Park; Attendance: 10,155 (1,407 Stags' fans); Referee: Paul Howard

22 March 2023 36	Mansfield Town	0–0	Grimsby Town	Mansfield
19:45 GMT		Report	Maher (yellow card) 53'	Stadium: One Call Stadium; Attendance: 7,569 (1,102 Grimsby supporters); Referee: Tom Reeves

25 March 2023 37	Mansfield Town	0–0	Sutton United	Mansfield
15:00 GMT	Gale (yellow card) 47'	Report	Bugiel (yellow card) 40'; Kizzi (yellow card) 70'; Randall (yellow card) 77'; Beautyman (yellow card) 79'	Stadium: One Call Stadium; Attendance: 6,288 (196 Sutton fans); Referee: Simon Mather

1 April 2023 38	Mansfield Town	4–1	Crawley Town	Mansfield
15:00 BST	Clarke 5'; Kilgour 47'; Keillor-Dunn 50', 65'; Quinn (yellow card) 54'	Report	Gordon (yellow card) 5'; Ogungbo 71'; Johnson (yellow card) 88'	Stadium: One Call Stadium; Attendance: 6,080 (105 Crawley fans); Referee: Sam Allison

7 April 2023 39	Swindon Town	2–4	Mansfield Town	Swindon
15:00 BST	Hepburn-Murphy 3'; Brewitt (yellow card) 20'; Austin (yellow card) 22'; Williams 86'	Report	Quinn 13', (yellow card) 57'; Akins 32'; Oates 33'; Hewitt (yellow card) 41'; Boateng 65'	Stadium: The County Ground; Attendance: 9,281 (587 Stags' fans); Referee: Thomas Parsons

10 April 2023 40	Mansfield Town	1–1	Rochdale	Mansfield
15:00 BST	Boateng 6'; Perch (yellow card) 73'	Report	Dodgson 43'; Kelly (yellow card) 82'; O'Donnell (yellow card) 90+4'	Stadium: One Call Stadium; Attendance: 6,708 (423 Rochdale fans); Referee: Anthony Backhouse

15 April 2023 41	Grimsby Town	1–1	Mansfield Town	Cleethorpes
15:00 BST	Efete (yellow card) 3'; Khan (penalty missed) 52'; Lloyd 52'; Maher (yellow card) 72'	Report	Hewitt (yellow card) 28'; Bowery 39'; Pym (yellow card) 52'; Wallace (yellow card) 87'	Stadium: Blundell Park; Attendance: 7,088 (1,236 Stags' fans); Referee: Neil Hair

18 April 2023 42	Newport County	1–2	Mansfield Town	Newport
19:45 BST	Bennett (yellow card) 19'; Demetriou (yellow card) 29'; Farquharson (yellow card) 53'; Wildig 86'	Report	Boateng 24'; Hewitt (yellow card) 25'; Perch (yellow card) 38'; Gale 73'; Keillor-Dunn (yellow card) 89'; Law (yellow card) 90+5'	Stadium: Rodney Parade; Attendance: 3,575 (200 Stags' fans); Referee: Thomas Kirk

22 April 2023 43	Mansfield Town	1–0	Stevenage	Mansfield
15:00 BST	Keillor-Dunn 11'; Gale (yellow card) 13'	Report	Sweeney (yellow card) 15'	Stadium: One Call Stadium; Attendance: 6,863 (384 Stevenage fans); Referee: James Linington

25 April 2023 44	Mansfield Town	1–2	Leyton Orient	Mansfield
19:45 BST	Keillor-Dunn 10'; Wallace (yellow card) 21'; Kilgour (yellow card) 54'	Report	Kelman 17'; Sotiriou 31'; Thompson (yellow card) 45+6'; Clay (yellow card) 50'; Ogie (red card) 62'; Sargeant (yellow card) 82'	Stadium: One Call Stadium; Attendance: 7,072 (527 away); Referee: Robert Lewis

29 April 2023 45	Mansfield Town	1–2	Harrogate Town	Mansfield
15:00 BST	Swan 67'; Gale (yellow card) 90+1'	Report	Kilgour 27' (o.g.); Mattock (yellow card) 33'; Daly 39'	Stadium: One Call Stadium; Attendance: 7,086 (191 Harrogate fans); Referee: David Rock

8 May 2023 46	Colchester United	0–2	Mansfield Town	Colchester
12:30 BST		Report	Harbottle 45+2'; Gale 90+7'	Stadium: Colchester Community Stadium; Attendance: 6,910; Referee: Ben Speedie

=== FA Cup ===
The Stags were drawn away to Barrow in the first round and to Sheffield Wednesday in the second round.

Win Draw Loss Fixtures

5 November 2022 First round	Barrow	0–1	Mansfield Town	Barrow-in-Furness
15:00 GMT	White (yellow card) 62'; Bennett (yellow card) 87'	Report	Hartigan (yellow card) 35'; Hawkins 39'; Perch (yellow card) 73'; Hewitt (yellow card) 81'	Stadium: Furness Building Society Stadium; Attendance: 2,501; Referee: Andy Haines

26 November 2022 Second round	Sheffield Wednesday	2–1	Mansfield Town	Owlerton, Sheffield
15:00 BST	Smith 78', 83'	Report	Lapslie 34'; Gordon (yellow card) 64'	Stadium: Hillsborough; Attendance: 13,932; Referee: Ollie Yates

=== EFL Cup ===
Win Draw Loss Fixtures

9 August 2022 First round	Mansfield Town	1–2	Derby County	Mansfield
19:45 BST	Hewitt (yellow card) 10'; O'Toole (yellow card) 41'; Hawkins 56'; Bowery (red card) 80'	Report	Hewitt 30' (o.g.); Wildsmith (yellow card) 51'; Barkhuizen 69'; Oduroh (yellow card) 90'	Stadium: One Call Stadium; Attendance: 6,861; Referee: Andrew Kitchen

=== EFL Trophy ===
On 20 June, the initial Group stage draw was made, grouping Mansfield Town with Derby County and Grimsby Town. In the second round, Town were drawn away to Everton U21.

Pos	Div	Team	Pld	W	PW	PL	L	GF	GA	GD	Pts	Qualification
1	L2	Grimsby Town	3	1	1	0	1	4	4	0	5	Advance to Round 2
2	L2	Mansfield Town	3	1	1	0	1	4	5	−1	5	Advance to Round 2
3	ACA	Manchester City U21	3	1	0	1	1	6	5	+1	4	
4	L1	Derby County	3	1	0	1	1	5	5	0	4	

Source: EFL.com

Win Draw Loss Fixtures

30 August 2022 Group stage	Mansfield Town	3–2	Manchester City U21	Mansfield
19:00 BST	Akins 16'; Gale 50'; Lapslie 84'	Report	Larios (yellow card) 25'; Borges 29'; Dickson 32'	Stadium: One Call Stadium; Attendance: 1,804; Referee: Ross Joyce

20 September 2022 Group stage	Grimsby Town	2–0	Mansfield Town	Cleethorpes
19:30 BST	Khan 15'; Orsi-Dadomo 39'; Pearson (yellow card) 60'	Report	O'Toole (yellow card) 33'	Stadium: Blundell Park; Attendance: 912; Referee: Bobby Madden

4 October 2022 Group stage	Mansfield Town	1–1 (6–5 p)	Derby County	Mansfield
19:00 BST	Maris (yellow card) 11' (goal) 45+3'; Clarke (yellow card) 74'; Hewitt (yellow card) 90+3'	Report	Dobbin 29'; Cashin (yellow card) 34'; Forsyth (yellow card) 72'; Mendez-Laing (yellow card) 83'	Stadium: One Call Stadium; Attendance: 3,630; Referee: Ben Toner
	Penalties
	Akins (penalty missed); Swan (penalty scored); Lapslie (penalty scored); Hewitt (penalty scored); Law (penalty missed); Gale (penalty scored); Clarke (penalty scored); Hawkins (penalty scored)		Mendez-Laing (penalty missed); Knight (penalty scored); Thompson (penalty scored); Forsyth (penalty missed); Cybulski (penalty scored); Roberts (penalty scored); Oduroh (penalty scored); Stearman (penalty missed)

30 November 2022 Second round	Everton U21	2–1	Mansfield Town	Walton
19:00 GMT	Higgins 90+1'; Cannon 90+4'	Report	Oates 6'; McLaughlin (yellow card) 30'	Stadium: Goodison Park; Attendance: 779; Referee: Adam Herczeg
