= 2021–22 Mansfield Town F.C. season =

Mansfield Town
2021–22 season
- Owners: Carolyn & John Radford
- Manager: Nigel Clough
- Stadium: Field Mill
- League Two: 7th
- FA Cup: Third round
- EFL Cup: First round
- EFL Trophy: Group stage
- Top goalscorer: League: Rhys Oates (9); All: Rhys Oates (12)
Home colours	Away colours

The 2021–22 season was Mansfield Town's 125th year in their history and ninth consecutive season in League Two. Along with the league, the club also competed in the FA Cup, the EFL Cup and the EFL Trophy. The season covered the period from 1 July 2021 to 30 June 2022.

== Squad statistics ==
As of 7 May 2022

No.	Pos	Nat	Player	Total		League Two		FA Cup		League Cup		EFL Trophy	
No.	Pos	Nat	Player	Apps	Goals	Apps	Goals	Apps	Goals	Apps	Goals	Apps	Goals
1	GK	(England) ENG	Nathan Bishop	46	0	46+0	0	0+0	0	0+0	0	0+0	0
2	DF	(England) ENG	Kellan Gordon	7	0	6+1	0	0+0	0	0+0	0	0+0	0
3	DF	(Republic of Ireland) IRL	Stephen McLaughlin	41	7	40+1	7	0+0	0	0+0	0	0+0	0
4	DF	(Wales) WAL	Elliott Hewitt	44	1	41+3	1	0+0	0	0+0	0	0+0	0
5	DF	(England) ENG	Richard Nartey	3	1	2+1	1	0+0	0	0+0	0	0+0	0
6	DF	(England) ENG	Farrend Rawson	30	1	23+7	1	0+0	0	0+0	0	0+0	0
7	MF	(Scotland) SCO	Jamie Murphy	14	1	14+0	1	0+0	0	0+0	0	0+0	0
7	MF	(Republic of Ireland) IRL	Harry Charsley (transferred)	16	2	10+6	2	0+0	0	0+0	0	0+0	0
8	MF	(England) ENG	Ollie Clarke	26	3	24+2	3	0+0	0	0+0	0	0+0	0
9	FW	(England) ENG	Jordan Bowery	40	8	25+15	8	0+0	0	0+0	0	0+0	0
10	MF	(England) ENG	George Maris	37	3	30+7	3	0+0	0	0+0	0	0+0	0
11	FW	(England) ENG	Danny Johnson	22	4	9+13	4	0+0	0	0+0	0	0+0	0
12	FW	(England) ENG	Oliver Hawkins	41	7	39+2	7	0+0	0	0+0	0	0+0	0
13	GK	(England) ENG	George Shelvey	0	0	0+0	0	0+0	0	0+0	0	0+0	0
14	DF	(England) ENG	James Perch	20	1	15+5	1	0+0	0	0+0	0	0+0	0
15	DF	(Republic of Ireland) IRL	Ryan Burke	4	0	1+3	0	0+0	0	0+0	0	0+0	0
16	MF	(Republic of Ireland) IRL	Stephen Quinn	36	1	36+0	1	0+0	0	0+0	0	0+0	0
17	MF	(England) ENG	Tyrese Sinclair	14	0	1+13	0	0+0	0	0+0	0	0+0	0
18	FW	(England) ENG	Rhys Oates	38	9	34+4	9	0+0	0	0+0	0	0+0	0
19	MF	(England) ENG	Keaton Ward	2	0	0+2	0	0+0	0	0+0	0	0+0	0
21	DF	(England) ENG	James Clarke	4	0	3+1	0	0+0	0	0+0	0	0+0	0
23	DF	(England) ENG	Kieran Wallace	17	0	3+14	0	0+0	0	0+0	0	0+0	0
23	DF	(England) ENG	Will Forrester (recalled)	4	0	2+2	0	0+0	0	0+0	0	0+0	0
24	GK	(Czech Republic) CZE	Marek Štěch	0	0	0+0	0	0+0	0	0+0	0	0+0	0
25	MF	(England) ENG	Ryan Stirk	31	2	23+8	2	0+0	0	0+0	0	0+0	0
26	FW	(England) ENG	Jason Law	5	0	1+4	0	0+0	0	0+0	0	0+0	0
30	FW	(England) ENG	George Cooper	0	0	0+0	0	0+0	0	0+0	0	0+0	0
31	FW	(England) ENG	James Gale	3	0	0+3	0	0+0	0	0+0	0	0+0	0
32	MF	(England) ENG	George Lapslie	32	4	21+11	4	0+0	0	0+0	0	0+0	0
34	FW	(England) ENG	Lucas Akins	19	1	15+4	1	0+0	0	0+0	0	0+0	0
35	MF	(Republic of Ireland) IRL	John-Joe O'Toole	27	2	25+2	2	0+0	0	0+0	0	0+0	0
44	MF	(England) ENG	Matty Longstaff	16	6	16+0	6	0+0	0	0+0	0	0+0	0

== Pre-season friendlies ==
The Stags announced they would play friendlies against Retford United, Matlock Town, Grimsby Town, Alfreton Town, Hull City, Coventry City, Basford United and Nottingham Forest U23s as part of the club's pre-season preparations.

13 July 2021 Friendly	Retford United	1–9	Mansfield Town	Retford
19:45 BST	Kane 40'	Report	Hawkins 20'; Quinn 24'; Johnson 30', 53'; Knowles 65'; Caine 70', 89'; Sinclair 77' (pen.), 80'	Stadium: Cannon Park; Attendance: 651

16 July 2021 Friendly	Matlock Town	1–0	Mansfield Town	Matlock
19:30 BST	Chippendale 14'	Report		Stadium: Proctor Cars Stadium

20 July 2021 Friendly	Mansfield Town	0–1	Grimsby Town	Pleasley
16:00 BST		Report	Sousa 66'	Stadium: The RH Academy Training Ground; Attendance: 0 (Behind-closed-doors)

23 July 2021 Friendly	Alfreton Town	1–2	Mansfield Town	Alfreton
19:30 BST	Allan 56'	Report	Caine 80'; Sinclair 90+1'	Stadium: Impact Arena; Attendance: 547; Referee: Daniel Middleton

24 July 2021 Friendly	Hull City	1–2	Mansfield Town	Kingston upon Hull
12:00 BST	Magennis 67'	Report	Johnson 31', 47'	Stadium: KCOM Stadium; Attendance: 1,862; Referee: James Oldham

27 July 2021 Friendly	Mansfield Town	1–0	Coventry City	Mansfield
19:00 BST	Lapslie 48'	Report		Stadium: One Call Stadium; Attendance: 2,539; Referee: David Webb

28 July 2021 Friendly	Basford United	0–3	Mansfield Town	Basford
19:30 BST			Sinclair 26', 30'; Caine 39'	Stadium: Greenwich Avenue

31 July 2021 Friendly	Mansfield Town	2–0	Nottingham Forest U23s	Pleasley
14:00 BST				Stadium: The RH Academy Training Ground; Attendance: 0 (Behind-closed-doors)

== Competitions ==
=== League Two ===
==== League table ====
Pos	Team	Pld	W	D	L	GF	GA	GD	Pts	Promotion, qualification or relegation
4	Northampton Town	46	23	11	12	60	38	+22	80	Qualification for League Two play-offs
5	Port Vale (O, P)	46	22	12	12	67	46	+21	78	Qualification for League Two play-offs
6	Swindon Town	46	22	11	13	77	54	+23	77	Qualification for League Two play-offs
7	Mansfield Town	46	22	11	13	67	52	+15	77	Qualification for League Two play-offs
8	Sutton United	46	22	10	14	69	53	+16	76	
9	Tranmere Rovers	46	21	12	13	53	40	+13	75	
10	Salford City	46	19	13	14	60	46	+14	70	

Source: EFL Official Website
Rules for classification: 1) Points; 2) Goal difference; 3) Number of goals scored; 4) Head-to-head results; 5) Wins; 6) Away goals; 7) Penalty points (sec 9.5); 8) 12-point sending off offences
(O) Play-off winners; (P) Promoted

==== Results summary ====
Overall								Home						Away					
Pld	W	D	L	GF	GA	GD	Pts	W	D	L	GF	GA	GD	W	D	L	GF	GA	GD
46	22	11	13	67	52	+15	77	15	4	4	40	24	+16	7	7	9	27	28	−1

Last updated: 7 May 2022.

==== Results by matchday ====
Matchday	1	2	3	4	5	6	7	8	9	10	11	12	13	14	15	16	17	18	19	20	21	22	23	24	25	26	27	28	29	30	31	32	33	34	35	36	37	38	39	40	41	42	43	44	45	46
Ground	H	H	A	H	A	H	A	H	A	H	H	A	H	A	H	A	H	A	A	H	H	H	H	H	A	H	A	H	A	A	A	H	A	A	A	A	A	H	A	A	H	A	H	H	A	H
Result	W	W	D	L	L	L	L	D	D	L	D	L	D	L	W	W	W	L	W	W	W	W	W	W	W	W	D	W	D	D	W	W	L	L	W	W	D	W	L	W	L	L	W	W	D	D
Position	4	3	3	4	7	14	20	20	20	22	21	22	21	23	20	18	17	17	15	11	11	9	8	7	7	6	6	5	6	6	6	3	9	10	10	8	8	6	6	4	6	8	6	5	5	7

Updated to match(es) played on 7 May 2022. Source: Statto.com
A = Away; H = Home; W = Win; D = Draw; L = Loss

==== Matches ====
Mansfield Town's fixtures were announced on 24 June 2021. On 7 July, the scheduled fixtures with Newport County were reversed due to renovation works at Rodney Parade.

7 August 2021 1	Mansfield Town	2–1	Bristol Rovers	Mansfield
15:00 BST	Maris (yellow card) 23'; Hawkins 42'; Johnson (yellow card) 79', (goal) 90+6' (pen.)	Report	Harries 62', (yellow card) 78'; Coutts (red card) 77'; Westbrooke (yellow card) 86'	Stadium: One Call Stadium; Attendance: 6,342; Referee: Josh Smith

14 August 2021 2	Mansfield Town	2–1	Newport County	Mansfield
15:00 BST	Maris 7'; Clarke 43'; Gordon (yellow card) 68'; Hawkins (yellow card) 74'	Report	Willmott 9'; Abraham (yellow card) 21'; Missilou (yellow card) 33'; Haynes (yellow card) 72'	Stadium: One Call Stadium; Attendance: 3,793; Referee: Anthony Backhouse

17 August 2021 3	Colchester United	1–1	Mansfield Town	Colchester
19:45 BST	Skuse (yellow card) 58'; Sears 90+5' (pen.)	Report	Quinn (yellow card) 68'; Hewitt 72'; Perch (yellow card) 90+4'	Stadium: JobServe Community Stadium; Attendance: 2,354; Referee: Sam Allison

21 August 2021 4	Mansfield Town	2–3	Bradford City	Mansfield
15:00 BST	Hawkins 37', 52'	Report	O'Connor 19'; Cooke (yellow card) 59'; Vernam 61'; Cook 87'	Stadium: One Call Stadium; Attendance: 6,058; Referee: Scott Oldham

28 August 2021 5	Swindon Town	1–0	Mansfield Town	Swindon
15:00 BST	Simpson 59'; Kesler Hayden (yellow card) 75'; Odimayo (yellow card) 88'; McKirdy (yellow card) 90+3'	Report	Clarke (yellow card) 37'	Stadium: County Ground; Attendance: 8,631; Referee: Bobby Madley

4 September 2021 6	Mansfield Town	1–3	Harrogate Town	Mansfield
15:00 BST	Oates 3'; Nartey (yellow card) 9'; Gordon (yellow card) 36'; Lapslie (yellow card) 38'; Clarke (red card) 73'; Quinn (red card) 74'; Maris (yellow card) 90+5'	Report	Armstrong 5'; Page (yellow card) 41'; Muldoon 45+2'; Burrell (yellow card) 66'; Falkingham (yellow card) 70'; Thomson 81'; Diamond (yellow card) 88'	Stadium: One Call Stadium; Attendance: 4,599; Referee: Paul Howard

11 September 2021 7	Walsall	3–1	Mansfield Town	Bescot
15:00 BST	Miller 6', 48'; Taylor 22'; Monthé (yellow card) 83'	Report	Hewitt (yellow card) 44'; Hawkins (yellow card) 83'; Johnson 84'	Stadium: Banks's Stadium; Attendance: 5,203; Referee: David Rock

18 September 2021 8	Mansfield Town	1–1	Rochdale	Mansfield
15:00 BST	Maris (yellow card) 68'; McLaughlin (yellow card) 71'; Johnson 72', (yellow card) 90+1'; Clarke (yellow card) 90+4'	Report	Cashman 50'	Stadium: One Call Stadium; Attendance: 4,336; Referee: Carl Boyeson

25 September 2021 9	Leyton Orient	0–0	Mansfield Town	Leyton
15:00 BST	Ogie (yellow card) 86'; Mitchell (yellow card) 86'; James (yellow card) 87'	Report	Hewitt (yellow card) 56'; Sinclair (red card) 85'; Oates (yellow card) 87'	Stadium: Breyer Group Stadium; Attendance: 5,252; Referee: Ben Speedie

2 October 2021 10	Mansfield Town	0–1	Barrow	Mansfield
15:00 BST	McLaughlin (yellow card) 36'; Lapslie (yellow card) 43'; Charsley (yellow card) 53'; Maris (yellow card) 67'; Rawson (red card) 90+6'	Report	Jones (yellow card) 25'; Ellis (yellow card) 34'; Gordon (yellow card) 45+3'; Banks 55' (pen.), (yellow card) 63'	Stadium: One Call Stadium; Attendance: 3,951; Referee: Tom Nield

9 October 2021 11	Mansfield Town	0–0	Oldham Athletic	Mansfield
15:00 BST	Clarke (yellow card) 38'; Lapslie (yellow card) 76'; Burke (yellow card) 90+2'	Report	Stobbs (yellow card) 37'; Clarke (yellow card) 86'	Stadium: One Call Stadium; Attendance: 4,556; Referee: Craig Hicks

16 October 2021 12	Northampton Town	2–0	Mansfield Town	Northampton
15:00 BST	McGowan 23'; Etete (yellow card) 24'; Horsfall 74', (yellow card) 75'	Report	Charsley (yellow card) 41'	Stadium: PTS Academy Stadium; Attendance: 6,034; Referee: Robert Lewis

19 October 2021 13	Mansfield Town	1–1	Port Vale	Mansfield
19:45 GMT	Rawson (yellow card) 31'; Hawkins (penalty missed) 42'; Lapslie 64'	Report	Conlon 33'; Martin (yellow card) 70'; Smith (yellow card) 90+6'	Stadium: One Call Stadium; Attendance: 4,202; Referee: Will Finnie

23 October 2021 14	Exeter City	2–1	Mansfield Town	Exeter
15:00 BST	Dieng 61'; Jay 83'	Report	Hawkins 50'; Lapslie (yellow card) 71'; Rawson (yellow card) 88'	Stadium: St James Park; Attendance: 4,329; Referee: Sam Purkiss

30 October 2021 15	Mansfield Town	2–0	Tranmere Rovers	Mansfield
15:00 BST	Johnson (penalty missed) 2', 67'; Oates 18'; McLaughlin (yellow card) 55'	Report	Spearing (yellow card) 35'	Stadium: One Call Stadium; Attendance: 3,831; Referee: James Bell

13 November 2021 16	Stevenage	1–2	Mansfield Town	Stevenage
15:00 GMT	Cuthbert 55'; Vancooten (yellow card) 85'; Norris (yellow card) 90+1'	Report	Hawkins (yellow card) 12'; O'Toole 19', (yellow card) 90+7'; Stirk 65', (yellow card) 90+4'	Stadium: Lamex Stadium; Attendance: 2,946; Referee: Chris Sarginson

20 November 2021 17	Mansfield Town	3–1	Scunthorpe United	Mansfield
15:00 GMT	Clarke 28', 60'; Bowery 45+1'	Report	Hippolyte 15' (pen.); Pugh (yellow card) 90+2'	Stadium: One Call Stadium; Attendance: 4,904; Referee: Ben Speedie

23 November 2021 18	Sutton United	2–0	Mansfield Town	Sutton
19:45 GMT	John 4'; Bugiel 69'	Report	Hawkins (yellow card) 5'; Stirk (yellow card) 32'; Clarke (yellow card) 72'	Stadium: Borough Sports Ground; Attendance: 2,497; Referee: David Rock

27 November 2021 19	Crawley Town	1–2	Mansfield Town	Crawley
15:00 GMT	Tilley 48'	Report	Hawkins (yellow card) 20', (goal) 24'; McLaughlin (yellow card) 52'; Oates 72'	Stadium: The People's Pension Stadium; Attendance: 1,824; Referee: Andy Davies

7 December 2021 20	Mansfield Town	1–0	Carlisle United	Mansfield
19:45 GMT	McLaughlin 6'; Bowery (yellow card) 64'; O'Toole (yellow card) 70'	Report		Stadium: One Call Stadium; Attendance: 3,695; Referee: Neil Hair

11 December 2021 21	Mansfield Town	2–1	Salford City	Mansfield
15:00 GMT	Hawkins (yellow card) 20'; Oates 36'; McLaughlin 45'; Lapslie (yellow card) 69'	Report	Lund 9'; Lowe (yellow card) 18'	Stadium: One Call Stadium; Attendance: 4,113; Referee: Anthony Backhouse

27 December 2021 22	Mansfield Town	3–2	Hartlepool United	Mansfield
15:00 GMT	O'Toole 55'; Bowery 62'; Maris 66'; Law (yellow card) 90+1'	Report	Molyneux 25'; Killip (yellow card) 38'; Byrne (yellow card) 40'; Featherstone 51', (yellow card) 90+6'	Stadium: One Call Stadium; Attendance: 5,558; Referee: Simon Mather

11 January 2022 23	Mansfield Town	3–2	Swindon Town	Mansfield
19:30 GMT	Maris 4'; Hawkins (yellow card) 15'; McLaughlin 32' (pen.); Bowery 43'; O'Toole (yellow card) 63'	Report	McKirdy 28'; Odimayo (yellow card) 30'; Conroy (yellow card) 63'; Hunt (yellow card) 73'; Iandolo 89'	Stadium: One Call Stadium; Attendance: 4,129; Referee: Tom Reeves

15 January 2022 24	Mansfield Town	2–0	Walsall	Mansfield
15:00 GMT	Hawkins (yellow card) 45+1'; Charsley 58', 89'	Report		Stadium: One Call Stadium; Attendance: 5,728; Referee: Ross Joyce

22 January 2022 25	Barrow	1–3	Mansfield Town	Barrow-in-Furness
15:00 GMT	Jones 17'; White (yellow card) 34'; Banks (yellow card) 67'; Kay (yellow card) 85'	Report	Oates 1'; McLaughlin 25'; Rawson (yellow card) 35' (yellow-red card) 39'; Hawkins (yellow card) 44'; Stirk (yellow card) 45+3'; Bowery 68'	Stadium: The Dune Hotel Stadium; Attendance: 3,224; Referee: Sam Barrott

29 January 2022 26	Mansfield Town	2–0	Leyton Orient	Mansfield
15:00 GMT	Hewitt (yellow card) 41'; Bowery 44'; Clarke 72'	Report	Smith (yellow card) 45'	Stadium: One Call Stadium; Attendance: 5,851; Referee: Sam Allison

1 February 2022 27	Harrogate Town	0–0	Mansfield Town	Harrogate
19:45 GMT	McArdle (yellow card) 41'; Diarra (yellow card) 88'	Report	O'Toole (yellow card) 37'; Clarke (yellow card) 46'	Stadium: EnviroVent Stadium; Attendance: 1,800; Referee: Christopher Pollard

8 February 2022 28	Mansfield Town	2–1	Colchester United	Mansfield
19:45 GMT	O'Toole (yellow card) 18'; Oates 19'; Akins (yellow card) 83'; Bowery 90+2' (pen.); Hewitt (yellow card) 90+6'	Report	Sarpong-Wiredu (yellow card) 23'; Kennedy (yellow card) 69'; Judge 90+7'	Stadium: One Call Stadium; Attendance: 4,815; Referee: Darren Handley

12 February 2022 29	Bristol Rovers	0–0	Mansfield Town	Horfield
15:00 GMT	Finley (yellow card) 33'; Collins (yellow card) 64'	Report	Quinn (yellow card) 53'; O'Toole (yellow card) 89'; Longstaff (yellow card) 90+3'	Stadium: The Memorial Stadium; Attendance: 7,707; Referee: John Busby

19 February 2022 30	Newport County	1–1	Mansfield Town	Newport
15:00 GMT	Baker-Richardson (yellow card) 74'; Telford 82' (pen.)	Report	Pask 68' (o.g.); O'Toole (red card) 73'; Hawkins (yellow card) 74'; Quinn (yellow card) 83'; McLaughlin (yellow card) 84'	Stadium: Rodney Parade; Attendance: 3,956; Referee: Will Finnie

26 February 2022 31	Bradford City	0–2	Mansfield Town	Bradford
15:00 GMT		Report	Quinn (yellow card) 21'; Oates 44'; Longstaff 48'; McLaughlin (yellow card) 65'; Stirk (yellow card) 67'; Lapslie (yellow card) 90+2'	Stadium: The Utilita Energy Stadium; Attendance: 16,797; Referee: Andrew Kitchen

4 March 2022 32	Mansfield Town	2–1	Exeter City	Mansfield
19:45 GMT	Rawson 34'; Longstaff 67'	Report	Jay 90+5'	Stadium: One Call Stadium; Attendance: 6,702; Referee: Ollie Yates

11 March 2022 33	Tranmere Rovers	3–2	Mansfield Town	Birkenhead
19:45 GMT	Clarke 5'; Nevitt 76', 90+5'	Report	Longstaff 45+6'; Hawkins 90+1'	Stadium: Prenton Park; Attendance: 7,857; Referee: Andy Haines

15 March 2022 34	Port Vale	3–1	Mansfield Town	Burslem
19:45 GMT	Wilson 33'; Pett (yellow card) 35'; Harratt 76', (yellow card) 77', (goal) 88'; Stone (yellow card) 90+1'	Report	Hawkins (yellow card) 11'; Oates 22'; Stirk (yellow card) 25'; Rawson (yellow card) 86'	Stadium: Vale Park; Attendance: 5,233; Referee: Peter Wright

22 March 2022 35	Rochdale	0–1	Mansfield Town	Spotland
19:45 GMT	Downing (yellow card) 31'	Report	Bowery 86'	Stadium: Crown Oil Arena; Attendance: 2,088; Referee: Seb Stockbridge

26 March 2022 36	Oldham Athletic	1–2	Mansfield Town	Oldham
15:00 GMT	Keillor-Dunn 24'; Whelan (yellow card) 73'; Rogers (yellow card) 84'	Report	Oates 53'; Perch (yellow card) 69'; Lapslie 90+5'	Stadium: Boundary Park; Attendance: 6,045; Referee: Ben Toner

29 March 2022 37	Hartlepool United	2–2	Mansfield Town	Hartlepool
19:45 BST	Grey 41'; Molyneux 43'	Report	Lapslie 21', (yellow card) 57'; Perch 25', (yellow card) 73'; Hawkins (yellow card) 90+3'	Stadium: The Suit Direct Stadium; Attendance: 4,577; Referee: Trevor Kettle

2 April 2022 38	Mansfield Town	1–0	Northampton Town	Mansfield
15:00 BST	McLaughlin (yellow card) 5'; Hawkins 21'; Hewitt (yellow card) 65'; Stirk (yellow card) 85'	Report	Lewis (yellow card) 75' (yellow-red card) 75'	Stadium: One Call Stadium; Attendance: 6,678; Referee: Anthony Backhouse

5 April 2022 39	Forest Green Rovers	1–0	Mansfield Town	Nailsworth
19:45 BST	March 14'; Matt (yellow card) 39'; Wilson (yellow card) 79'; Adams (yellow card) 84'	Report	Hawkins (yellow card) 11'; Wallace (yellow card) 38'; Lapslie (red card) 49'; Hewitt (yellow card) 90'	Stadium: The Fully Charged New Lawn; Attendance: 2,784; Referee: Carl Brook

9 April 2022 40	Scunthorpe United	0–4	Mansfield Town	Scunthorpe
15:00 BST	Feeney (yellow card) 10'; Delaney (yellow card) 45'	Report	Grant 16' (o.g.); McLaughlin 32'; Stirk 38'; Quinn 46'; Akins (yellow card) 65'	Stadium: Sands Venue Stadium; Attendance: 4,015; Referee: John Busby

15 April 2022 41	Mansfield Town	2–3	Sutton United	Mansfield
15:00 BST	Quinn (yellow card) 57'; Goodliffe 78' (o.g.); Longstaff 90+7'	Report	Bugiel 9'; Ajiboye 49'; Bennett 80'	Stadium: One Call Stadium; Attendance: 6,134; Referee: Neil Hair

18 April 2022 42	Carlisle United	1–0	Mansfield Town	Carlisle
15:00 BST	Patrick 56', (yellow card) 89'; Armer (yellow card) 68'; Simeu (yellow card) 79'; Dickenson (yellow card) 90+3'	Report		Stadium: Brunton Park; Attendance: 5,496; Referee: Ross Joyce

23 April 2022 43	Mansfield Town	2–0	Crawley Town	Mansfield
15:00 BST	Murphy 26'; Perch (yellow card) 36'; Akins 72'; Lapslie (yellow card) 83'	Report	Tilley (yellow card) 45+2' (yellow-red card) 69'	Stadium: One Call Stadium; Attendance: 5,022; Referee: David Rock

26 April 2022 44	Mansfield Town	2–0	Stevenage	Mansfield
19:45 BST	Perch (yellow card) 15'; Maris (yellow card) 21'; Lapslie 51'; Longstaff 90+3'	Report	Taylor (yellow card) 43'; Andrade (yellow card) 87'	Stadium: One Call Stadium; Attendance: 5,086; Referee: Chris Sarginson

2 May 2022 45	Salford City	2–2	Mansfield Town	Salford
12:30 BST	Turnbull 2', (yellow card) 13'; Lund 52'; Love (yellow card) 63'; Kelly (yellow card) 87'; Lowe (yellow card) 90+1'	Report	O'Toole (yellow card) 4'; McLaughlin 15', 45+3' (pen.)	Stadium: Peninsula Stadium; Attendance: 3,765; Referee: Seb Stockbridge

7 May 2022 46	Mansfield Town	2–2	Forest Green Rovers	Mansfield
15:00 BST	Longstaff 17'; McLaughlin (yellow card) 37'; Bowery 78'	Report	Adams 64'; March 80', (yellow card) 81'	Stadium: One Call Stadium; Attendance: 7,374; Referee: Bobby Madley

==== Play-offs ====
14 May 2022 Semi-final 1st Leg	Mansfield Town	2–1	Northampton Town	Mansfield
19:45 BST	Oates 13'; Bowery 32'; Maris (yellow card) 50'; Perch (yellow card) 61'	Report	McWilliams (yellow card) 22'; Koiki 61'	Stadium: One Call Stadium; Attendance: 7,469; Referee: Anthony Backhouse

18 May 2022 Semi-final 2nd Leg	Northampton Town	0–1 (1–3 agg.)	Mansfield Town	Northampton
19:45 BST	Pinnock (yellow card) 87'; Horsfall (yellow card) 90+2'	Report	McLaughlin 32'; O'Toole (yellow card) 53'; Wallace (yellow card) 63'	Stadium: Sixfields Stadium; Attendance: 7,619; Referee: Ben Toner

28 May 2022 Final	Mansfield Town	0–3	Port Vale	London
15:00 BST		Report	Harratt 20'; Wilson 24'; Benning 85'	Stadium: Wembley Stadium; Attendance: 37,303; Referee: Jarred Gillett

=== FA Cup ===
Mansfield were drawn away to Sunderland in the first round, Doncaster Rovers in the second round and home to Middlesbrough in the third round.

6 November 2021 First round	Sunderland	0–1	Mansfield Town	Sunderland
15:00 GMT	Evans (yellow card) 31'; Wright (yellow card) 50'	Report	Oates 5'; Hewitt (yellow card) 48'; Charsley (yellow card) 60'; Quinn (yellow card) 80'	Stadium: Stadium of Light; Attendance: 8,620; Referee: James Oldham

4 December 2021 Second round	Doncaster Rovers	2–3	Mansfield Town	Doncaster
15:00 GMT	Horton 7'; Ravenhill (yellow card) 56'; Rowe 84'	Report	Will Forrester 48'; Lapslie 60', 71'; Stirk (yellow card) 88'	Stadium: Keepmoat Stadium; Attendance: 7,040; Referee: Seb Stockbridge

8 January 2022 Third round	Mansfield Town	2–3	Middlesbrough	Mansfield
12:15 GMT	Hewitt (yellow card) 38'; O'Toole (yellow card) 64'; Hawkins 67', (yellow card) 71'; Oates 85'	Report	Ikpeazu 4', (yellow card) 37'; Boyd-Munce 14'; Bamba (yellow card) 33'; O'Toole 90+5' (o.g.)	Stadium: One Call Stadium; Attendance: 7,297; Referee: Keith Stroud

=== EFL Cup ===
Mansfield were drawn at home to Preston North End in the first round.

10 August 2021 First round	Mansfield Town	0–3	Preston North End	Mansfield
19:45 BST		Report	Sinclair 45+1', 81'; Riis Jakobsen 71'; Bauer (yellow card) 78'	Stadium: One Call Stadium; Attendance: 2,526; Referee: Ross Joyce

=== EFL Trophy ===
Pos	Div	Team	Pld	W	PW	PL	L	GF	GA	GD	Pts	Qualification
1	L1	Sheffield Wednesday	3	3	0	0	0	9	1	+8	9	Advance to Round 2
2	L2	Harrogate Town	3	2	0	0	1	5	5	0	6	Advance to Round 2
3	L2	Mansfield Town	3	1	0	0	2	8	8	0	3	
4	ACA	Newcastle United U21	3	0	0	0	3	3	11	−8	0	

Source: EFL.com

31 August 2021 Group game 1	Harrogate Town	3–1	Mansfield Town	Harrogate
19:45 BST	Power (yellow card) 24'; Orsi-Dadomo 44', 53', 69'; Sheron (yellow card) 45'; Pattison (yellow card) 51'; Thomson (yellow card) 68'	Report	Bowery (penalty missed) 52'; Lapslie 66'	Stadium: The EnviroVent Stadium; Attendance: 825; Referee: Andy Haines

5 October 2021 Group game 2	Mansfield Town	1–2	Sheffield Wednesday	Mansfield
19:00 BST	Charsley (yellow card) 28'; Burke (yellow card) 63'; Quinn 68'; Ward (yellow card) 87'	Report	Wing 63'; Kamberi 90+3'	Stadium: One Call Stadium; Attendance: 2,836; Referee: Rebecca Welch

9 November 2021 Group game 3	Mansfield Town	6–3	Newcastle United U21	Mansfield
19:00 GMT	Johnson 16', 53', 70' (pen.); Ward (yellow card) 41'; O'Toole 45+2'; Rawson (yellow card) 57'; Caine (yellow card) 71', (goal) 90+2'; Sinclair 78' (pen.)	Report	Stephenson 5'; White 23'; Young (yellow card) 39'; Langley (yellow card) 77'; Ndiweni (yellow card) 86', (goal) 90'	Stadium: One Call Stadium; Attendance: 805; Referee: Alan Young

== Transfers ==
=== Transfers in ===
Date	Position	Nationality	Name	From	Fee	Ref.
21 June 2021	CF	(England)	Oliver Hawkins	(England) Ipswich Town	Undisclosed	
1 July 2021	RB	(Wales)	Elliott Hewitt	(England) Grimsby Town	Free transfer	
1 July 2021	CF	(England)	Danny Johnson	(England) Leyton Orient	Free transfer	
1 July 2021	CM	(Republic of Ireland)	Stephen Quinn	(England) Burton Albion	Free transfer	
2 July 2021	LB	(Republic of Ireland)	Ryan Burke	(England) Birmingham City	Free transfer	
8 July 2021	LW	(England)	Rhys Oates	(England) Hartlepool United	Free transfer	
23 October 2021	CM	(Republic of Ireland)	John-Joe O'Toole	(England) Burton Albion	Free transfer	
20 January 2022	RW	(Grenada)	Lucas Akins	(England) Burton Albion	Free transfer	
28 January 2022	LB	(England)	Kieran Wallace	(England) Burton Albion	Free transfer	

=== Loans in ===
Date from	Position	Nationality	Name	From	Date until	Ref.
1 July 2021	GK	(England)	Nathan Bishop	(England) Manchester United	End of season	
1 July 2021	GK	(England)	George Shelvey	(England) Nottingham Forest	End of season	
27 July 2021	DM	(Wales)	Ryan Stirk	(England) Birmingham City	End of season	
31 August 2021	CB	(England)	Will Forrester	(England) Stoke City	9 January 2022	
31 August 2021	CB	(England)	Richard Nartey	(England) Burnley	End of season	
31 January 2022	CM	(England)	Matty Longstaff	(England) Newcastle United	End of season	
31 January 2022	LW	(Scotland)	Jamie Murphy	(Scotland) Hibernian	End of season	

=== Loans out ===
Date from	Position	Nationality	Name	To	Date until	Ref.
16 July 2021	CB	(Wales)	Rollin Menayese	(England) Walsall	4 January 2022	(Note: On 4 January 2022, Rollin Menayese signed for Walsall on a permanent basis.)
3 August 2021	RB	(Republic of Ireland)	Corey O'Keeffe	(England) Rochdale	January 2022	
16 August 2021	CF	(England)	Jimmy Knowles	(Scotland) Greenock Morton	End of season	
11 December 2021	GK	(Republic of Ireland)	Owen Mason	(England) Guiseley	9 February 2022 (Note: On 14 January, Owen Mason's loan at Guiseley was extended by a further month.)	
6 January 2022	CF	(England)	Nathan Caine	(England) Ilkeston Town	6 February 2022	
24 January 2022	LM	(England)	Tyrese Sinclair	(England) Scunthorpe United	End of season	

=== Transfers out ===
Date	Position	Nationality	Name	To	Fee	Ref.
30 June 2021	LB	(England)	Mal Benning	(England) Port Vale	Free transfer	
30 June 2021	CF	(England)	Andy Cook	(England) Bradford City	Released	
30 June 2021	CF	(England)	Nicky Maynard	(England) Tranmere Rovers	Released	
30 June 2021	RB	(England)	Joe Riley	Retired	—N/a	
30 June 2021	GK	(England)	Aidan Stone	(England) Port Vale	Released	
30 June 2021	CB	(Republic of Ireland)	Ryan Sweeney	(England) Dundee	Released	
30 June 2021	CB	(England)	Aiden Walker	(England) Brighouse Town	Released	
30 June 2021	CB	(England)	Jake Wright	(England) Boston	Released	
13 July 2021	CF	(Northern Ireland)	Jamie Reid	(England) Stevenage	Undisclosed	
4 January 2022	CB	(Wales)	Rollin Menayese	(England) Walsall	Undisclosed	
12 January 2022	CB	(Republic of Ireland)	Aaron O'Driscoll	(Republic of Ireland) Shelbourne	Undisclosed	
28 January 2022	RB	(Republic of Ireland)	Corey O'Keeffe	(England) Rochdale	Free transfer	
28 January 2022	CM	(Republic of Ireland)	Harry Charsley	(England) Port Vale	Undisclosed	
