= 2020–21 Mansfield Town F.C. season =

Mansfield Town
2020–21 season
- Chief Executive: Carolyn Radford
- Manager: Graham Coughlan (until 27 October); Nigel Clough (from 6 November)
- Stadium: Field Mill
- League Two: 16th
- FA Cup: Third round
- EFL Cup: First round
- EFL Trophy: Group stage
- Top goalscorer: League: Jordan Bowery (10); All: Jordan Bowery (10)
Home colours	Away colours

The 2020–21 season was the 124th season in the history of Mansfield Town and the eighth consecutive season in the League Two. Along with League Two, the club also participated in the FA Cup, EFL Cup and EFL Trophy.

The season covers the period from 1 July 2020 to 30 June 2021.

== Transfers ==
=== Transfers in ===
Date	Position	Nationality	Name	From	Fee	Ref.
1 July 2020	CF	(England)	Jordan Bowery	(England) Milton Keynes Dons	Undisclosed	
1 July 2020	CM	(England)	Ollie Clarke	(England) Bristol Rovers	Free transfer	
1 July 2020	CF	(Northern Ireland)	Jamie Reid	(England) Torquay United	Free transfer	
1 July 2020	GK	(Czech Republic)	Marek Štěch	(England) Luton Town	Free transfer	
17 July 2020	CB	(England)	Farrend Rawson	(England) Forest Green Rovers	Free transfer	
28 July 2020	CM	(England)	George Maris	(England) Cambridge United	Undisclosed	
28 July 2020	CB	(Wales)	Rollin Menayese	(England) Bristol Rovers	Undisclosed	
13 August 2020	RB	(Republic of Ireland)	Corey O'Keeffe	(England) Birmingham City	Free transfer	
13 August 2020	RB	(England)	James Perch	(England) Scunthorpe United	Free transfer	
19 August 2020	CB	(Republic of Ireland)	Aaron O'Driscoll	(England) Southampton	Free transfer	
11 September 2020	LM	(Republic of Ireland)	Stephen McLaughlin	(England) Southend United	Free transfer	
19 January 2021	CM	(England)	George Lapslie	(England) Charlton Athletic	Undisclosed	
26 February 2021	CB	(England)	Jake Wright	(England) Hereford	Free transfer	
5 March 2021	MF	(England)	Keaton Ward	(England) Barnsley	Free transfer	

=== Loans in ===
Date	Position	Nationality	Name	From	Date until	Ref.
15 October 2020	CM	(England)	George Lapslie	(England) Charlton Athletic	18 January 2021	
15 January 2021	CM	(Republic of Ireland)	Stephen Quinn	(England) Burton Albion	End of season	
1 February 2021	GK	(England)	Jamie Pardington	(England) Wolverhampton Wanderers	End of season	
1 February 2021	CF	(Montenegro)	Oliver Sarkic	(England) Blackpool	End of season	

=== Loans out ===
Date	Position	Nationality	Name	To	Date until	Ref.
10 September 2020	CF	(England)	Jimmy Knowles	(England) Notts County	End of season	
17 September 2020	CB	(England)	Jamie Chisholm	(England) Kettering Town	13 October 2020	
13 November 2020	CM	(England)	Alistar Smith	(England) Altrincham	14 January 2021	
18 January 2021	CB	(Wales)	Rollin Menayese	(England) Grimsby Town	End of season	
27 January 2021	CF	(England)	Andy Cook	(England) Bradford City	End of season	
2 February 2021	CF	(England)	Nicky Maynard	(Wales) Newport County	End of season	
26 February 2021	CB	(Republic of Ireland)	Aaron O'Driscoll	(Republic of Ireland) Longford Town	End of season	

=== Transfers out ===
Date	Position	Nationality	Name	To	Fee	Ref.
1 July 2020	CM	(England)	Neal Bishop	(England) Scarborough Athletic	Released	
1 July 2020	CF	(Wales)	Craig Davies	Unattached	Released	
1 July 2020	LW	(England)	Otis Khan	(England) Tranmere Rovers	Released	
1 July 2020	GK	(Republic of Ireland)	Conrad Logan	(England) Anstey Nomads	Released	
1 July 2020	RM	(Scotland)	Alex MacDonald	(England) Gillingham	Released	
1 July 2020	GK	(Austria)	Bobby Olejnik	Retired		
1 July 2020	CB	(Barbados)	Krystian Pearce	(England) Solihull Moors	Released	
1 July 2020	CB	(England)	Matt Preston	(England) Barnet	Released	
1 July 2020	RM	(Saint Kitts and Nevis)	Omari Sterling-James	(England) Kidderminster Harriers	Released	
1 July 2020	CB	(England)	Noah Stokes	(England) Curzon Ashton	Released	
1 July 2020	RB	(England)	Hayden White	(England) Walsall	Released	
22 July 2020	LM	(England)	CJ Hamilton	(England) Blackpool	Undisclosed	
1 August 2020	LW	(England)	Tom Fielding	(United States) Coastal Carolina Chanticleers	Free transfer	
14 August 2020	CB	(England)	Lewis Gibbens	(England) Boston United	Free transfer	
7 September 2020	CM	(England)	Willem Tomlinson	(England) Padiham	Mutual consent	
13 September 2020	RM	(England)	Rio Molyneaux	(England) Alfreton Town	Free transfer	
19 September 2020	CF	(England)	Jordan Graham	(England) Tamworth	Free transfer	
2 October 2020	CF	(England)	Danny Rose	(England) Northampton Town	Undisclosed	
15 January 2021	CM	(England)	Alistair Smith	(England) Altrincham	Free transfer	

== Pre-season ==
18 August 2020 Friendly	Mansfield Town	2–0	Nottingham Forest Under-23s	Warsop
11:00 BST	Benning 58'; Knowles 89'	Report		Stadium: The John Fretwell Sporting Complex; Attendance: 0

22 August 2020 Friendly	Mansfield Town	0–3	Rotherham United	Mansfield
13:00 BST		Report	Mattock 53'; Smith 63'; Miller 89'	Stadium: Field Mill; Attendance: 0

== Competitions ==
=== EFL League Two ===
==== League table ====
Pos	Team	Pld	W	D	L	GF	GA	GD	Pts
12	Crawley Town	46	16	13	17	56	62	−6	61
13	Port Vale	46	17	9	20	57	57	0	60
14	Stevenage	46	14	18	14	41	41	0	60
15	Bradford City	46	16	11	19	48	53	−5	59
16	Mansfield Town	46	13	19	14	57	55	+2	58
17	Harrogate Town	46	16	9	21	52	61	−9	57
18	Oldham Athletic	46	15	9	22	72	81	−9	54
19	Walsall	46	11	20	15	45	53	−8	53
20	Colchester United	46	11	18	17	44	61	−17	51

Updated to match(es) played on 31 May 2021. Source: EFL Official Website
Rules for classification: 1) Points; 2) Goal difference; 3) Number of goals scored; 4) Head-to-head results; 5) Wins; 6) Away goals; 7) Penalty points (sec 9.5); 8) 12-point sending off offences

==== Results summary ====
Overall								Home						Away					
Pld	W	D	L	GF	GA	GD	Pts	W	D	L	GF	GA	GD	W	D	L	GF	GA	GD
46	13	19	14	57	55	+2	58	6	10	7	33	31	+2	7	9	7	24	24	0

Last updated: 8 May 2021.
Source: BBC

==== Results by matchday ====
Matchday	1	2	3	4	5	6	7	8	9	10	11	12	13	14	15	16	17	18	19	20	21	22	23	24	25	26	27	28	29	30	31	32	33	34	35	36	37	38	39	40	41	42	43	44	45	46
Ground	H	A	H	A	H	H	A	A	H	H	A	A	H	H	A	H	A	A	H	A	H	H	A	A	A	A	H	H	A	H	A	A	H	A	H	H	H	A	H	A	H	A	H	A	H	A
Result	D	D	L	L	D	L	D	D	L	D	D	W	D	L	W	D	D	L	D	W	W	W	W	W	D	D	L	L	L	W	L	L	W	L	D	D	D	D	L	D	D	W	W	L	W	W
Position	16	16	19	20	20	23	22	21	22	22	22	21	21	22	19	19	19	19	20	19	19	15	12	13	14	14	15	18	19	16	19	19	16	16	16	16	18	19	19	19	19	18	18	18	17	16

Updated to match(es) played on 8 May 2021. Source: 11v11 for league tables and fixtures
A = Away; H = Home; W = Win; D = Draw; L = Loss

==== Matches ====
Win Draw Loss Postponed

The 2020–21 season fixtures were released on 21 August.

12 September 2020 1	Mansfield Town	0–0	Tranmere Rovers	Mansfield
15:00 BST		Report		Stadium: Field Mill; Attendance: 0 Referee: James Bell

19 September 2020 2	Leyton Orient	2–2	Mansfield Town	Leyton
15:00 BST	Brophy (yellow card) 51'; Johnson 82'; Sotiriou (yellow card) 89' (goal) 90+2'	Report	Bowery 52' (pen.); O'Keeffe (yellow card) 55'; Cook 72' (yellow card) 85'	Stadium: Brisbane Road; Attendance: 0 Referee: David Rock

26 September 2020 3	Mansfield Town	1–2	Exeter City	Mansfield
15:00 BST	Menayese 20'; Charsley (yellow card) 28'; Clarke (yellow card) 29'	Report	Bowman (yellow card) 35'; Rawson 40' (o.g.); Key 76'	Stadium: Field Mill; Attendance: 0 Referee: Christopher Pollard

3 October 2020 4	Newport County	2–1	Mansfield Town	Newport
15:00 BST	Twine 78'; Dolan 88' (pen.)	Report	Perch (yellow card) 65'; McLaughlin 69'; O'Keeffe (yellow card) 87'; Smith (yellow card) 87'	Stadium: Rodney Parade; Attendance: 0 Referee: Sam Allison

10 October 2020 5	Mansfield Town	0–0	Stevenage	Mansfield
15:00 BST	Maynard (yellow card) 60'	Report	Newton (yellow card) 88'	Stadium: Field Mill; Attendance: 0 Referee: Seb Stockbridge

17 October 2020 6	Mansfield Town	1–3	Bradford City	Mansfield
15:00 BST	Lapslie (yellow card) 44' (yellow-red card) 78'; Cook 85'; Benning (yellow card) 90+2'	Report	Štěch 8' (o.g.); Wood 14'; Cooke (yellow card) 51'; Donaldson 69'	Stadium: Field Mill; Attendance: 0 Referee: Paul Howard

20 October 2020 7	Morecambe	1–1	Mansfield Town	Morecambe
18:30 BST	Phillips 3' (yellow card) 35'; Lavelle (yellow card) 50'; Cooney (yellow card) 82'	Report	Charsley 26'; McLaughlin (yellow card) 29'	Stadium: Globe Arena; Attendance: 0 Referee: Marc Edwards

24 October 2020 8	Cheltenham Town	0–0	Mansfield Town	Cheltenham
15:00 BST		Report	Perch (yellow card) 16'; McLaughlin (yellow card) 55'; Menayese (yellow card) 62'	Stadium: Whaddon Road; Attendance: 0 Referee: Neil Hair

27 October 2020 9	Mansfield Town	2–4	Barrow	Mansfield
19:00 GMT	O'Driscoll (yellow card) 21' (yellow-red card) 51'; Perch 35'; Charsley 89'	Report	Barry 10' (yellow card) 90+2'; Platt (yellow card) 15'; Brough 23'; Kay (yellow card) 43' (goal) 61', 79'	Stadium: Field Mill; Attendance: 0 Referee: Keith Stroud

31 October 2020 10	Mansfield Town	1–1	Walsall	Mansfield
15:00 GMT	Maynard 33' (yellow card) 80'; Perch (yellow card) 62'	Report	Adebayo 49'; White (yellow card) 50'; Lavery (yellow card) 90+2'	Stadium: Field Mill; Attendance: 0 Referee: Alan Young

3 November 2020 11	Bolton Wanderers	1–1	Mansfield Town	Horwich
19:00 BST	Sarcevic 90'	Report	Lapslie 57' (yellow card) 77'	Stadium: University of Bolton Stadium; Attendance: 0 Referee: Andy Haines

14 November 2020 12	Forest Green Rovers	1–2	Mansfield Town	Nailsworth
15:00 GMT	Cadden (yellow card) 38'; Winchester (yellow card) 45+2'; Bailey 85'	Report	Lapslie 6'; Benning (yellow card) 22'; Charsley 35'	Stadium: The New Lawn; Attendance: 0 Referee: Brett Huxtable

20 November 2020 13	Mansfield Town	1–1	Colchester United	Mansfield
19:00 GMT	Clarke (yellow card) 63'; Maynard 67'; Rawson (yellow card) 88'	Report	Norris 86'	Stadium: Field Mill; Attendance: 0 Referee: Ben Speedie

24 November 2020 14	Mansfield Town	0–1	Harrogate Town	Mansfield
19:00 GMT		Report	Miller 27'	Stadium: Field Mill; Attendance: 0 Referee: Carl Boyeson

2 December 2020 15	Cambridge United	0–1	Mansfield Town	Cambridge
19:45 GMT		Report	Menayese (yellow card) 24'; Sweeney (yellow card) 34'; Reid 64'	Stadium: Abbey Stadium; Attendance: 1,917; Referee: Robert Lewis

5 December 2020 16	Mansfield Town	3–3	Crawley Town	Mansfield
15:00 GMT	Sweeney 4'; Lapslie 72'; Cook 90+3'	Report	Watters 49', 59' (yellow card) 88'; Dallison 54'; Frost (yellow card) 76'	Stadium: Field Mill; Attendance: 0 Referee: Chris Sarginson

12 December 2020 17	Grimsby Town	1–1	Mansfield Town	Cleethorpes
15:00 GMT	Bennett (yellow card) 48'; Jackson Jr 63'; Russell (yellow card) 68'; Clifton (yellow card) 72'; Morais (yellow card) 87'	Report	Gordon (yellow card) 54'; Maynard 69' (pen.); Lapslie (yellow card) 89'	Stadium: Blundell Park; Attendance: 0 Referee: Carl Brook

15 December 2020 18	Carlisle United	1–0	Mansfield Town	Carlisle
19:00 GMT	Hayden (yellow card) 26'; Patrick 39'; Bennett (yellow card) 65'; Mellish (yellow card) 68'; Farman (yellow card) 69'; Riley (yellow card) 88'	Report	Clarke (yellow card) 64'	Stadium: Brunton Park; Attendance: 0 Referee: Peter Wright

19 December 2020 19	Mansfield Town	1–1	Southend United	Mansfield
15:00 GMT	Clarke (yellow card) 56'; Cook (yellow card) 77'; Bowery 79'	Report	Olayinka 27'; Egbri (yellow card) 65'; Klass (yellow card) 72'; Taylor (yellow card) 78'	Stadium: Field Mill; Attendance: 0 Referee: Brett Huxtable

26 December 2020 20	Scunthorpe United	2–3	Mansfield Town	Scunthorpe
13:00 GMT	Clarke (yellow card) 26'; Rawson 38' (o.g.); McAtee 70'	Report	Lapslie 16'; Onariase 29' (o.g.); Bowery 60'; Gordon (yellow card) 88'	Stadium: Glanford Park; Attendance: 0 Referee: Graham Salisbury

2 January 2021 21	Mansfield Town	4–0	Port Vale	Mansfield
15:00 GMT	Clarke 1'; Bowery 32', 77' (pen.), 80'; Sinclair (penalty missed) 87'	Report	Legge (yellow card) 29' (yellow-red card) 47'; Brown (yellow card) 32'; Brisley (yellow card) 90'; Montaño (yellow card) 90+1'	Stadium: Field Mill; Attendance: 0 Referee: Marc Edwards

5 January 2021 22	Mansfield Town	2–1	Salford City	Mansfield
19:00 GMT	Lapslie 15'; Bowery 30'	Report	Hunter (yellow card) 65'; Eastham (yellow card) 72'; Bernard 90+1'	Stadium: Field Mill; Attendance: 0 Referee: Will Finnie

12 January 2021 23	Oldham Athletic	2–3	Mansfield Town	Oldham
19:45 GMT	McCalmont 6'; McAleny (yellow card) 61', (goal) 84'; Rowe (yellow card) 65'	Report	Cook (yellow card) 34'; Charsley 36'; Sweeney 38'; Bowery (penalty missed) 45+4'; Reid 49'; Lapslie (yellow card) 87'	Stadium: Boundary Park; Attendance: 0 Referee: Scott Oldham

23 January 2021 24	Southend United	0–1	Mansfield Town	Southend-on-Sea
15:00 GMT	Dieng (yellow card) 54' (yellow-red card) 84'; Hart (yellow card) 78'	Report	Reid 64'; Quinn (yellow card) 70'	Stadium: Roots Hall; Attendance: 0 Referee: Ben Speedie

9 February 2021 25	Walsall	1–1	Mansfield Town	Bescot
18:45 GMT	Melbourne 23'; Wright (yellow card) 29'; Kinsella (yellow card) 61'	Report	Quinn (yellow card) 26'; Clarke 31'; Gordon (yellow card) 86'	Stadium: Bescot Stadium; Attendance: 0 Referee: Alan Young

14 February 2021 26	Colchester United	2–2	Mansfield Town	Colchester
15:00 GMT	Harriott 39'; Pell (yellow card) 67'; Nouble 89'	Report	Smith 4' (o.g.); Perch 81'	Stadium: Colchester Community Stadium; Attendance: 0 Referee: Chris Sarginson

17 February 2021 27	Mansfield Town	2–3	Bolton Wanderers	Mansfield
17:00 GMT	Charsley (yellow card) 2'; Perch (yellow card) 11'; Clarke 65'; Reid 72'	Report	John 79'; Benning 85' (o.g.); Gnahoua 89'	Stadium: Field Mill; Attendance: 0 Referee: Antony Coggins

20 February 2021 28	Mansfield Town	0–3	Cambridge United	Mansfield
15:00 GMT	Maris (yellow card) 90'	Report	Mullin 57', 65'; Knibbs 90+1'	Stadium: Field Mill; Attendance: 0 Referee: Sam Purkiss

23 February 2021 29	Harrogate Town	1–0	Mansfield Town	Harrogate
19:00 GMT	Martin 46'; Falkingham (yellow card) 71'	Report	Sinclair (yellow card) 88'	Stadium: Wetherby Road; Attendance: 0 Referee: Ross Joyce

27 February 2021 30	Mansfield Town	1–0	Morecambe	Mansfield
15:00 GMT	Sweeney (yellow card) 21'; Bowery 41'	Report	Gibson (yellow card) 20'; Lavelle (yellow card) 45'; Mellor (yellow card) 72'	Stadium: Field Mill; Attendance: 0 Referee: Anthony Backhouse

2 March 2021 31	Bradford City	1–0	Mansfield Town	Bradford
19:00 GMT	Crankshaw (yellow card) 22'; Rowe 32'; Wood (yellow card) 52'	Report	Maris (yellow card) 7'; Benning (yellow card) 44'; Clarke (red card) 90+5'	Stadium: Valley Parade; Attendance: 0 Referee: Paul Howard

6 March 2021 32	Barrow	2–0	Mansfield Town	Barrow-in-Furness
15:00 GMT	Brough 74', 77'	Report	Gordon (yellow card) 73'; Sweeney (yellow card) 46' (yellow-red card) 63'; Clarke (yellow card) 26'; Reid (yellow card) 81'	Stadium: Holker Street; Attendance: 0 Referee: Carl Boyeson

9 March 2021 33	Mansfield Town	3–1	Cheltenham Town	Mansfield
19:00 GMT	Bowery 55', 65'; Reid 63'	Report	Griffiths (yellow card) 10'; Smith 51'	Stadium: Field Mill; Attendance: 0 Referee: Scott Oldham

13 March 2021 34	Crawley Town	1–0	Mansfield Town	Crawley
15:00 GMT	Tilley 90+2'	Report	Benning (yellow card) 62'; Quinn (yellow card) 90+4'	Stadium: The People's Pension Stadium; Attendance: 0 Referee: Thomas Bramall

16 March 2021 35	Mansfield Town	1–1	Carlisle United	Mansfield
19:00 GMT	McLaughlin 80'	Report	Dickenson (yellow card) 60'; Zanzala 66', (yellow card) 69'	Stadium: Field Mill; Attendance: 0 Referee: Michael Salisbury

20 March 2021 36	Mansfield Town	2–2	Grimsby Town	Mansfield
15:00 GMT	Maris 20'; Law 67'; McLaughlin (yellow card) 70'; Sweeney (yellow card) 90'; Wright (yellow card) 90+6'	Report	Jackson Jr (yellow card) 56'; John-Lewis 63'; Matete (yellow card) 63'; Williams 90+1'	Stadium: Field Mill; Attendance: 0 Referee: John Busby

23 March 2021 37	Mansfield Town	0–0	Forest Green Rovers	Mansfield
18:00 GMT	Law (yellow card) 65'; McLaughlin (yellow card) 81'; Reid (yellow card) 82'	Report	Wilson (yellow card) 62'	Stadium: Field Mill; Attendance: 0 Referee: David Webb

27 March 2021 38	Tranmere Rovers	1–1	Mansfield Town	Birkenhead
15:00 GMT	Woolery 45+2'; Spearing (yellow card) 59'; Khan (yellow card) 89'	Report	Law (yellow card) 68'; Quinn 76'	Stadium: Prenton Park; Attendance: 0 Referee: Will Finnie

2 April 2021 39	Mansfield Town	0–2	Leyton Orient	Mansfield
15:00 BST	Sweeney (yellow card) 89'	Report	Johnson 5', 77'; Kemp (yellow card) 86'	Stadium: Field Mill; Attendance: 0 Referee: Bobby Madley

5 April 2021 40	Exeter City	0–0	Mansfield Town	Exeter
15:00 BST	Parkes (yellow card) 20'; Page (yellow card) 50'; Collins (yellow card) 71'; Bowman (yellow card) 90'	Report	Clarke (yellow card) 4'; Sinclair (yellow card) 80'	Stadium: St James Park; Attendance: 0 Referee: Carl Brook

9 April 2021 41	Mansfield Town	1–1	Newport County	Mansfield
18:00 BST	Lapslie (yellow card) 57'; Sinclair 84'	Report	Labadie 75', (yellow card) 88'; Lewis (yellow card) 81'	Stadium: Field Mill; Attendance: 0 Referee: Christopher Pollard

17 April 2021 42	Stevenage	0–1	Mansfield Town	Stevenage
12:30 BST	Vancooten (yellow card) 21'	Report	Lapslie (yellow card) 14'; Sweeney 24'; Maris (yellow card) 72'	Stadium: Broadhall Way; Attendance: 0 Referee: Sam Barrott

20 April 2021 43	Mansfield Town	3–0	Scunthorpe United	Mansfield
19:00 BST	Lapslie 19'; Sweeney (yellow card) 62'; McLaughlin (yellow card) 71'; Perch 80'; Sinclair 83'	Report	Spence (yellow card) 66'	Stadium: Field Mill; Attendance: 0 Referee: Brett Huxtable

24 April 2021 44	Salford City	2–0	Mansfield Town	Salford
15:00 BST	Hunter 5'; Henderson (yellow card) 30', (goal) 62', (penalty missed) 74'; Towell (red card) 68'	Report	Stone (yellow card) 73'	Stadium: Moor Lane; Attendance: 0 Referee: James Oldham

1 May 2021 45	Mansfield Town	4–1	Oldham Athletic	Mansfield
15:00 BST	Sinclair 12'; Lapslie 38', 80'; Reid 88'	Report	Dearnley 51'; Clarke (yellow card) 77'	Stadium: One Call Stadium; Attendance: 0 Referee: Antony Coggins

8 May 2021 46	Port Vale	0–3	Mansfield Town	Burslem
15:00 BST	Brisley (yellow card) 77'	Report	McLaughlin 10', 63'; Sweeney (yellow card) 22'; Quinn 30'; Reid (yellow card) 79'	Stadium: Vale Park; Attendance: 0 Referee: Sam Allison

=== FA Cup ===
Win Draw Loss

The draw for the first round was made on Monday 26, October. The second round draw was revealed on Monday, 9 November by Danny Cowley. The third round draw was made on 30 November, with Premier League and EFL Championship clubs all entering the competition.

8 November 2020 First round	Sunderland	0–1	Mansfield Town	Sunderland
15:00 GMT		Report	Lapslie 49'	Stadium: Stadium of Light; Attendance: 0 Referee: Anthony Backhouse

29 November 2020 Second round	Mansfield Town	2–1 (a.e.t.)	Dagenham & Redbridge	Mansfield
13:30 GMT	Charsley 25'; Maynard 120+2'	Report	McCallum 19'; Deering (yellow card) 63'	Stadium: Field Mill; Attendance: 0 Referee: Lee Swabey

10 January 2021 Third round	Cheltenham Town	2–1 (a.e.t.)	Mansfield Town	Cheltenham
13:30 GMT	May 73'; Boyle 110'	Report	McLaughlin 3'; O'Keeffe (yellow card) 69'; Sweeney (yellow card) 101'	Stadium: Whaddon Road; Attendance: 0 Referee: Tom Nield

=== EFL Cup ===
Win Draw Loss

The first round draw was made on 18 August, live on Sky Sports, by Paul Merson.

29 August 2020 First round	Preston North End	4–0	Mansfield Town	Preston
15:00 BST	Barkhuizen 14'; Maguire 22'; Bauer 29'; Harrop 65'	Report		Stadium: Deepdale; Attendance: 0 Referee: Ross Joyce

=== EFL Trophy ===
Win Draw Loss

The regional group stage draw was confirmed on 18 August.

Pos	Div	Team	Pld	W	PW	PL	L	GF	GA	GD	Pts	Qualification
1	ACA	Manchester City U21	3	2	0	1	0	8	1	+7	7	Advance to Round 2
2	L1	Lincoln City	3	1	2	0	0	5	3	+2	7	Advance to Round 2
3	L2	Mansfield Town	3	1	0	0	2	3	7	−4	3	
4	L2	Scunthorpe United	3	0	0	1	2	2	7	−5	1	

Source: EFL.com

8 September 2020 Group stage	Mansfield Town	0–3	Manchester City U21	Mansfield
18:00 BST	Menayese (yellow card) 36'; Sweeney (yellow card) 40'; Clarke (yellow card) 55'; Knowles (yellow card) 90+3'	Report	Bernabé 25'; Delap (yellow card) 40' (goal) 89', 90+1'; Mbete-Tabu (yellow card) 76'; Burns (yellow card) 90+3'	Stadium: Field Mill; Attendance: 0 Referee: Tom Nield

6 October 2020 Group stage	Mansfield Town	1–3	Lincoln City	Mansfield
19:00 BST	Perch (yellow card) 34'; Gordon (yellow card) 55'; Menayese 72'	Report	Soule 31'; Scully 49'; Edun (yellow card) 55'; Archibald (yellow card) 61' (goal) 62'	Stadium: Field Mill; Attendance: 0 Referee: Ben Toner

10 November 2020 Group stage	Scunthorpe United	1–2	Mansfield Town	Scunthorpe
19:00 GMT	Loft (yellow card) 27'; O'Malley (yellow card) 63'; Rowe (yellow card) 75'; Olomola 78'	Report	Sweeney 34'; Reid 44'	Stadium: Glanford Park; Attendance: 0 Referee: Sam Barrott

== Appearances and goals ==
Numbers in parentheses denote appearances as substitute.
Players with names struck through and marked † left the club during the playing season.
Players with names in italics and marked * were on loan from another club for the whole of their season with Mansfield.
Key to positions: GK – Goalkeeper; DF – Defender; MF – Midfielder; FW – Forward

Players included in matchday squads
No.	Pos.	Nat.	Name	League Two		FA Cup		EFL Cup		EFL Trophy		Total	
No.	Pos.	Nat.	Name	Apps	Goals	Apps	Goals	Apps	Goals	Apps	Goals	Apps	Goals
1	GK	CZE	Marek Štěch	23 (1)	0	3	0	1	0	1	0	28 (1)	0
2	DF	IRL	Corey O'Keeffe	7 (6)	0	1 (1)	0	1	0	2	0	11 (7)	0
3	DF	ENG	Malvind Benning	25 (7)	0	3	0	1	0	2	0	31 (7)	0
4	DF	WAL	~~Rollin Menayese~~ †	10	1	0	0	1	0	3	1	14	2
5	DF	IRL	Ryan Sweeney	33 (3)	3	2	0	1	0	3	1	39 (3)	4
6	DF	ENG	Farrend Rawson	43	0	3	0	1	0	0	0	47	0
7	MF	IRL	Harry Charsley	32 (11)	4	3	1	1	0	1	0	37 (11)	5
8	MF	ENG	Ollie Clarke	27 (6)	3	1	0	0	0	1 (1)	0	29 (7)	3
9	FW	ENG	Jordan Bowery	38 (5)	10	3	0	0	0	1	0	42 (5)	10
10	FW	ENG	George Maris	39 (1)	1	2 (1)	0	1	0	0	0	42 (2)	1
11	FW	ENG	~~Andy Cook~~ †	8 (12)	3	1 (1)	0	1	0	1	0	11 (13)	3
12	MF	ENG	Kellan Gordon	28 (4)	0	2	0	0	0	1 (2)	0	31 (6)	0
14	DF	ENG	James Perch	31 (1)	3	1	0	1	0	1	0	34 (1)	3
15	MF	IRL	~~Aaron O'Driscoll~~ †	1 (2)	0	0 (1)	0	0 (1)	0	3	0	4 (4)	0
16	MF	IRL	Stephen Quinn *	21 (2)	2	0	0	0	0	0	0	21 (2)	2
17	FW	MNE	Oliver Šarkić	0 (4)	0	0	0	0	0	0	0	0 (4)	0
18	DF	ENG	Joe Riley	0	0	0	0	0	0	0	0	0	0
19	FW	NIR	Jamie Reid	31 (8)	6	1 (1)	0	0 (1)	0	3	1	35 (10)	7
20	MF	IRL	Stephen McLaughlin	29 (7)	4	3	1	0	0	0 (1)	0	32 (8)	5
21	DF	ENG	James Clarke	1 (1)	0	0 (1)	0	0	0	1	0	2 (2)	0
22	FW	ENG	~~Nicky Maynard~~ †	9 (8)	3	1 (1)	1	0	0	1 (1)	0	11 (10)	4
23	DF	ENG	Jake Wright	0 (2)	0	0	0	0	0	0	0	0 (2)	0
24	DF	IRL	Jaden Charles	0 (2)	0	0	0	0	0	0	0	0 (2)	0
25	MF	ENG	Keaton Ward	1 (6)	0	0	0	0	0	0	0	1 (6)	0
27	FW	ENG	Tyrese Sinclair	7 (12)	3	0	0	0 (1)	0	3	0	10 (13)	3
28	FW	ENG	~~Jimmy Knowles~~ †	0	0	0	0	0	0	0 (1)	0	0 (1)	0
29	FW	ENG	Jason Law	12 (5)	1	0	0	0	0	1	0	13 (5)	1
30	MF	ENG	~~Alistair Smith~~ †	0 (1)	0	0	0	0	0	2 (1)	0	2 (2)	0
30	GK	ENG	Jamie Pardington *	1 (1)	0	0	0	0	0	0	0	1 (1)	0
32	FW	ENG	~~Danny Rose~~ †	0	0	0	0	1	0	0	0	1	0
31	GK	ENG	Aidan Stone	22	0	0 (1)	0	0	0	2	0	24 (1)	0
32	MF	ENG	George Lapslie	27 (2)	8	3	1	0	0	0	0	30 (2)	9
33	FW	ENG	Josh Scott	0	0	0	0	0	0	0 (1)	0	0 (1)	0
34	FW	ENG	Nathan Caine	0	0	0	0	0	0	0 (1)	0	0 (1)	0
36	DF	ENG	Aiden Walker	0	0	0	0	0	0	0	0	0	0
37	GK	ENG	Maison Campbell	0	0	0	0	0	0	0	0	0	0
