= Ryan Stirk =

Professional footballer (born 2000)

Personal information
- Full name: Ryan William Stirk
- Date of birth: 25 September 2000 (age 26)
- Place of birth: Birmingham, England
- Height: 1.78 m (5 ft 10 in)
- Position: Midfielder

Team information
- Current team: Chesterfield
- Number: 8

Youth career
- 2010–2020: Birmingham City

Senior career*
Years	Team	Apps	(Gls)
2020–2023	Birmingham City	3	(0)
2021–2022	→ Mansfield Town (loan)	31	(2)
2023	→ Bromley (loan)	14	(1)
2023–2025	Walsall	81	(4)
2025–	Chesterfield	21	(0)

International career
2015	Wales U16	2	(0)
2016	Wales U17	3	(0)
2017–2019	Wales U19	7	(1)
2019–2021	Wales U21	7	(0)
- * Club domestic league appearances and goals as of 23 January 2026

Ryan William Stirk (born 25 September 2000) is a professional footballer who plays as a midfielder for EFL League Two club Chesterfield. He is a former Wales under-21 international.

Stirk began his career with Birmingham City, for whom he made his EFL debut in 2021. He spent the 2021–22 season on loan to Mansfield Town of League Two and the second half of the following season on loan to National League club Bromley. Birmingham released him in 2023, and he signed for Walsall.

== Club career ==
=== Early life and career ===
Stirk was born in Birmingham, and raised in Tamworth, Staffordshire, where he attended Landau Forte Academy. His parents were both keen on football and he has two older brothers. He joined Birmingham City F.C.'s Academy in 2010, went on a pre-season tour with the under-18s while still a 14-year-old schoolboy, took up a scholarship in July 2017, and signed his first professional contract, of three years with the option for a fourth, on his 17th birthday. He was a member of the club's under-18 team that reached the semifinal of the 2017–18 FA Youth Cup, performing well against a strong Chelsea side, and became a regular in Birmingham's under-23 team in 2018–19.

=== Birmingham City ===
When head coach Pep Clotet fielded an inexperienced team for the visit to Portsmouth in the 2019–20 EFL Cup first round, in which several youngsters made their senior debuts, Stirk was an unused substitute. The club took up their one-year option on his contract, and when the Championship season resumed after its suspension because of the COVID-19 pandemic, he was named on the nine-man bench for six of Birmingham's remaining nine matches under the temporary rules, but remained unused.

Once relegation was safely avoided at the end of the 2020–21 season, Birmingham manager Lee Bowyer stated that he intended to use the two remaining matches to assess fringe members of the squad. Described by the Birmingham Mail as a "diminutive but neat defensive midfielder who reads the game well and breaks up play before inviting team-mates into the play", Stirk made his first-team debut in a much-changed starting eleven for the Championship match at home to Cardiff City on 1 May 2021, played the whole of the 4–0 defeat, and kept his place for the last fixture of the season. In June, Stirk extended his contract for a further year with an option for a second.

==== Loans ====
Stirk signed for League Two club Mansfield Town on 27 July 2021, on loan for the 2021–22 season. He joined up with former Birmingham U23 team-mate Ryan Burke, who joined Mansfield earlier in the month after being released by Birmingham. He made his debut on the opening day of the season, as a stoppage-time replacement for George Maris in a 2–1 win at home to Bristol Rovers, and came close to opening the scoring with a "low first-time shot ... through a crowd of players" in the EFL Cup first-round tie at home to Championship opponents Preston North End before the visitors went on to win 3–0. In mid-September he damaged ankle ligaments and was out for six weeks, but returned to score his first senior goal and secure a 2–1 win away to Stevenage on 13 November. He finished the season with 36 appearances in all competitions, helping Mansfield reach the play-off final but was an unused substitute as they failed to gain promotion.

He made a couple of appearances for Birmingham in August 2022, before joining National League club Bromley on 16 February 2023 on loan until the end of the season. He was a regular in the starting eleven, scoring once from 14 appearances in the regular season, and won the club's Player of the Month award for two of the three months he was with Bromley as he helped the team reach the play-offs. He "was behind most of Bromley's good moves" as they beat Woking in the play-off eliminator, but was substituted in the semi-final as they lost out to Chesterfield 3–2 after extra time.

=== Walsall ===
Out of contract at the end of the 2022–23 season, Stirk was one of 13 professionals included on Birmingham's list of players released. On 16 June 2023, League Two club Walsall confirmed that Stirk would join them on 1 July on a two-year contract.

On 18 June 2025, Stirk joined Chesterfield after leaving Walsall.

== International career ==
Stirk was born in England, and qualifies for Wales via his maternal grandmother. He was an unused substitute for Wales U16 while still a 13-year-old, made his under-17 debut at 15, and went on to play at under-19 and under-21 levels.

== Career statistics ==
As of match played 16 May 2025

Appearances and goals by club, season and competition
Club	Season	League			FA Cup		EFL Cup		Other		Total	
Club	Season	Division	Apps	Goals	Apps	Goals	Apps	Goals	Apps	Goals	Apps	Goals
Birmingham City	2019–20	Championship	0	0	0	0	0	0	—		0	0
Birmingham City	2020–21	Championship	2	0	0	0	0	0	—		2	0
Birmingham City	2021–22	Championship	—		—		—		—		—	
Birmingham City	2022–23	Championship	1	0	0	0	1	0	—		2	0
Birmingham City	Total		3	0	0	0	1	0	—		4	0
Mansfield Town (loan)	2021–22	League Two	31	2	2	0	1	0	2 (Note: One appearance in EFL Trophy, one in League Two play-offs)	0	36	2
Bromley (loan)	2022–23	National League	14	1	—		—		2 (Note: Appearances in National League play-offs)	0	16	1
Walsall	2023–24	League Two	37	3	3	0	1	0	2 (Note: Appearances in EFL Trophy)	0	43	3
Walsall	2024–25	League Two	44	1	2	0	3	0	4 (Note: Two appearances in EFL Trophy, two in League Two play-offs)	0	53	1
Walsall	Total		81	4	5	0	4	0	6	0	96	4
Career total			129	7	7	0	6	0	10	0	152	7
