= Oliver Hawkins =

English footballer (born 1992)

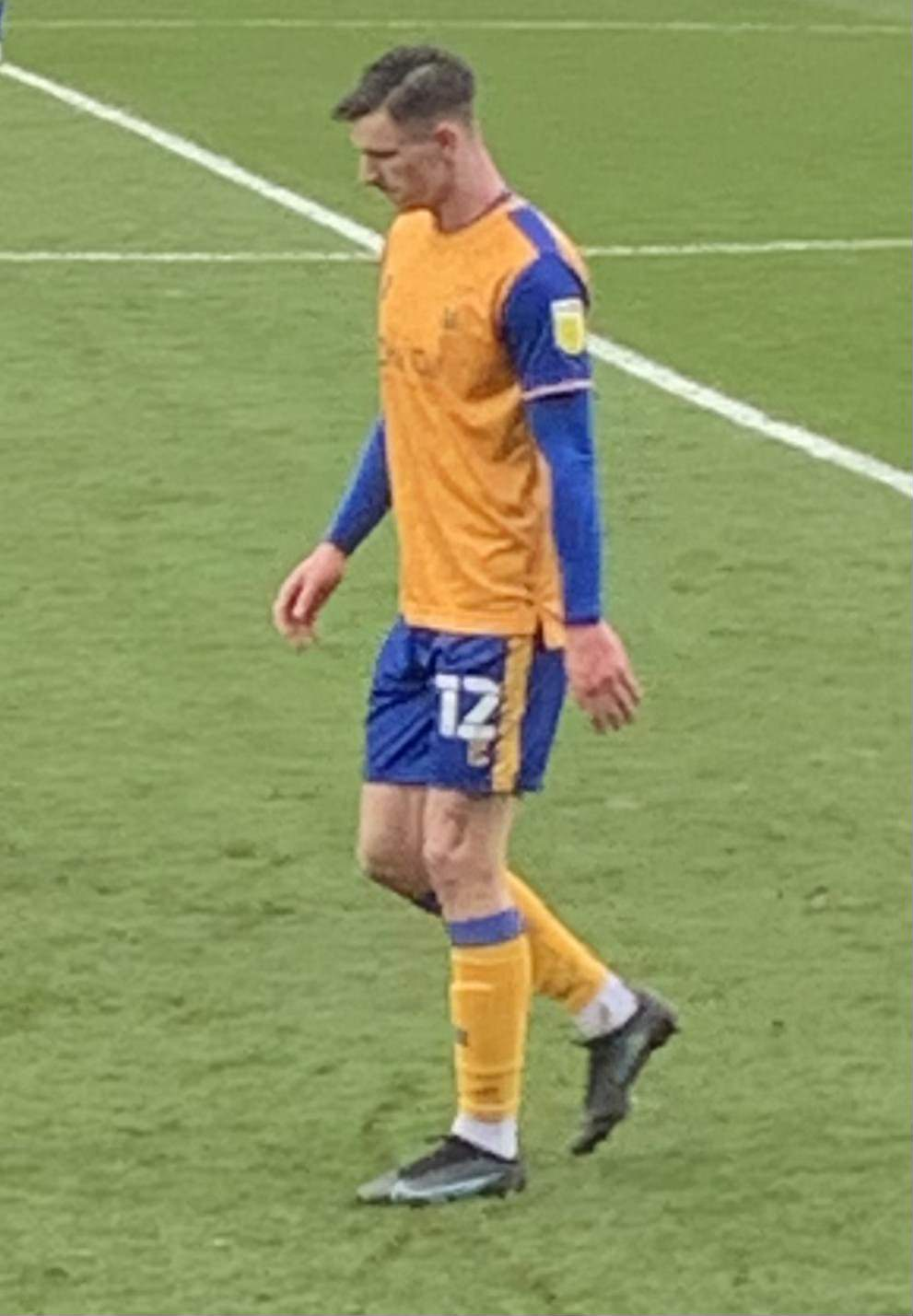
- Hawkins playing for Mansfield Town in 2022

Personal information
- Full name: Oliver Jack Hawkins
- Date of birth: 8 April 1992 (age 34)
- Place of birth: Ealing, England
- Height: 6 ft 6 in (1.98 m)
- Positions: Forward; defender

Team information
- Current team: Eastleigh

Senior career*
Years	Team	Apps	(Gls)
2009–2010	North Greenford United		
2010–2011	Hillingdon Borough	24	(10)
2011–2013	Northwood	90	(34)
2013–2016	Hemel Hempstead Town	81	(24)
2013–2014	→ Harrow Borough (dual-reg)	11	(2)
2016–2017	Dagenham & Redbridge	63	(19)
2017–2020	Portsmouth	77	(14)
2020–2021	Ipswich Town	20	(1)
2021–2023	Mansfield Town	63	(10)
2023–2025	Gillingham	71	(7)
2025–2026	Barnet	37	(3)
2026–	Eastleigh	0	(0)
- * Club domestic league appearances and goals as of 18:45, 2 May 2026 (UTC)

Oliver Jack Hawkins (born 8 April 1992) is an English professional footballer who plays as a striker or centre back for Eastleigh.

== Club career ==
=== Early career ===
Hawkins began his career at North Greenford United but it was at Hillingdon Borough where he really began to break through, scoring 10 goals during the 2010–11 season. He joined Northwood in 2011. Hawkins would finish as Northwood's top scorer, scoring 19 goals in all competitions in both seasons (2011–12, 2012–13).

Unsurprisingly Hawkins' excellent form attracted the attention of clubs at higher levels, and the striker duly signed for then Southern League Premier Division side Hemel Hempstead Town in the summer of 2013 having impressed in pre-season. Hawkins would spend time at Isthmian League side Harrow Borough, before returning and establishing himself as a regular for the Tudors.

During the 2013–14 season, Hawkins helped Hemel Hempstead Town earn promotion as champions of the Southern League Premier Division, making 23 league appearances and scoring four times. During the 2014–15 season he found his goalscoring touch, and he also lined up against Bury in the first round of the FA Cup. The striker remained a prolific scorer as the club embarked on their second season in the National League South.

=== Dagenham & Redbridge ===
On 15 January 2016, Hawkins completed his move to League Two side Dagenham & Redbridge for an undisclosed fee on a two-and-a-half-year deal. Hawkins had first come to the attention of Dagenham boss John Still when Still was manager of Luton Town. He made his debut the next day as an 81st-minute substitute against Northampton Town. His first Football League goal came on 20 February 2016 in a 3–2 defeat against Mansfield Town. Hawkins was unable to help prevent Dagenham's relegation to the National League in 2016.

=== Portsmouth ===
On 31 August 2017, Hawkins signed for League One side Portsmouth on transfer deadline day, joining on a 3-year deal. He made his debut for Portsmouth against Rotherham United on 3 September. He scored his first goal for the club in a 3–0 win over Bristol Rovers on 26 September. He scored 8 goals in 35 appearances in his first season at the club, including braces in wins against Milton Keyenes Dons and Northampton Town. Hawkins displayed versatility for Portsmouth, filling in as a central defender on several occasions during his time at the club.

Hawkins became a key part of the Portsmouth squad during the 2018–19 season. He featured regularly as a striker as Portsmouth finished 4th in the league, while also reaching the final of the 2018–19 EFL Trophy Final, which took place on 31 March 2019 at Wembley. Hawkins scored the winning spotkick in the penalty shootout to win the trophy for Portsmouth for the first time in the club's history.

He featured less regularly during the 2019–20 season, making 9 starts and 3 substitute appearances without scoring during an injury hit season. Hawkins left Portsmouth at the end of the 2019–20 season after Pompey's play-off semi final exit.

=== Ipswich Town ===
On 17 August 2020, Hawkins signed a 2-year deal at League One side Ipswich Town. He made his debut for the club on 5 September, featuring as a second-half substitute in a 3–0 home win over Bristol Rovers at Portman Road in a first round EFL Cup tie. He scored his first goal for Ipswich in a 1–0 win over Crewe Alexandra on 31 October 2020. On 22 January, Ipswich announced that Hawkins required a knee operation which would rule him out of action for up to 6 weeks. He ended the season having made 23 appearances for Ipswich, scoring once.

=== Mansfield Town ===
On 21 June 2021, Hawkins joined Mansfield Town for an undisclosed fee, signing a two-year deal. He scored on his debut in a 2-1 win against Bristol Rovers. On 28 May 2022 he was sent off in the League Two play-off final against Port Vale.

=== Gillingham ===
Hawkins joined fellow League Two club Gillingham in January 2023 for an undisclosed fee. On 15 May 2024, the club put him on the transfer list.

On 14 May 2025, it was announced that Hawkins would not renew his contract with Gillingham.

=== Barnet ===
Following his release from Gillingham, Hawkins joined Barnet in June 2025. After three goals in forty appearances, he was not retained at the end of the season.

=== Eastleigh ===
Hawkins joined Eastleigh for the 2026-27 season.

== Career statistics ==
As of end of 2025-26 season

Appearances and goals by club, season and competition
Club	Season	League			FA Cup		League Cup		Other		Total	
Club	Season	Division	Apps	Goals	Apps	Goals	Apps	Goals	Apps	Goals	Apps	Goals
Hillingdon Borough	2010–11	SSML Premier Division	24	10	1	0	—		2 (Note: Appearances in FA Vase)	0	27	10
Northwood	2010–11	SL Division One Central	9	1	—		—		—		9	1
Northwood	2011–12	SL Division One Central	40	16	1	0	—		7 (Note: Appearance(s) in FA Trophy)	3	48	19
Northwood	2012–13	SL Division One Central	41	17	5	0	—		9	2	55	19
Northwood	Total		90	34	6	0	—		16	5	112	39
Hemel Hempstead Town	2013–14	SL Premier Division	23	4	3	0	—		3	0	29	4
Hemel Hempstead Town	2014–15	Conference South	38	12	4	0	—		4	2	46	14
Hemel Hempstead Town	2015–16	National League South	20	8	3	1	—		1	2	24	11
Hemel Hempstead Town	Total		81	24	10	1	—		8	4	99	29
Harrow Borough (dual-reg)	2013–14	IL Premier Division	11	2	—		—		—		11	2
Dagenham & Redbridge	2015–16	League Two	18	1	—		—		—		18	1
Dagenham & Redbridge	2016–17	National League	38	18	3	1	—		3 (Note: Two appearances in National League play-offs, one appearance in FA Trophy)	0	44	19
Dagenham & Redbridge	2017–18	National League	7	0	—		—		—		7	0
Dagenham & Redbridge	Total		63	19	3	1	—		3	0	69	20
Portsmouth	2017–18	League One	31	7	1	0	—		3 (Note: Appearances in EFL Trophy)	1	35	8
Portsmouth	2018–19	League One	39	7	3	1	1	0	5 (Note: Three appearances and two goals in EFL Trophy, two appearances in EFL League One play-offs)	2	48	10
Portsmouth	2019–20	League One	7	0	1	0	1	0	4 (Note: Three appearances in EFL Trophy, one appearance in EFL League One play-offs)	0	13	0
Portsmouth	Total		77	14	5	1	2	0	7	3	96	18
Ipswich Town	2020–21	League One	20	1	1	0	2	0	0	0	23	1
Mansfield Town	2021–22	League Two	41	7	2	1	0	0	3 (Note: Three appearances in EFL League Two play-offs)	0	46	8
Mansfield Town	2022–23	League Two	22	3	2	1	1	1	1	0	26	5
Mansfield Town	Total		63	10	4	2	1	1	4	0	72	13
Gillingham	2022–23	League Two	22	3	0	0	0	0	0	0	22	3
Gillingham	2023–24	League Two	24	4	1	0	0	0	0	0	25	4
Gillingham	2024–25	League Two	25	0	0	0	0	0	1	0	26	0
Gillingham	Total		71	7	1	0	0	0	1	0	73	7
Barnet	2025–26	League Two	37	3	1	0	0	0	2	0	40	3
Career total			527	134	32	5	5	1	48	12	611	152

== Honours ==
Hemel Hempstead Town

- Southern League Premier Division: 2013–14

Portsmouth

- EFL Trophy: 2018–19
