= Stephen McLaughlin =

Irish footballer

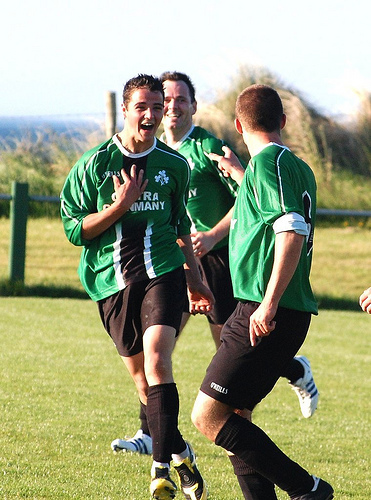
- McLaughlin with Clonmany Shamrocks

Personal information
- Full name: Stephen Antony McLaughlin
- Date of birth: 14 June 1990 (age 36)
- Place of birth: County Donegal, Ireland
- Height: 1.78 m (5 ft 10 in)
- Positions: Left-back; left midfielder

Team information
- Current team: Mansfield Town
- Number: 3

Youth career
- 2006–2008: Clonmany Shamrocks FC

Senior career*
Years	Team	Apps	(Gls)
2008–2010	Finn Harps	48	(2)
2011–2013	Derry City	57	(13)
2013–2015	Nottingham Forest	9	(0)
2013	→ Bristol City (loan)	5	(0)
2014	→ Notts County (loan)	13	(0)
2014–2015	→ Southend United (loan)	6	(1)
2015–2020	Southend United	153	(19)
2020–	Mansfield Town	192	(17)
- * Club domestic league appearances and goals as of 26 January 2026 (UTC)

Stephen Antony McLaughlin (born 14 June 1990) is an Irish professional footballer who plays as a left-back and left midfielder for EFL League One club Mansfield Town.

Beginning his senior career with Finn Harps, McLaughlin spent five years in Ireland before moving to England with Nottingham Forest. After a series of loan spells, he joined Southend United on a permanent transfer in 2015, spending five years at the club before joining Mansfield Town in 2020.

== Career ==
=== Early years ===
McLaughlin began his career at his local club St. Mary's, and played all his under-age football for the club. In 2006, he signed for Clonmany Shamrocks senior side of the Inishowen Football League, and was successful during his first spell in junior football.

=== Finn Harps ===
After appearing in League and Cup finals for Clonmany, McLaughlin was signed by Finn Harps, and played for their Under 20 and A Championship sides upon arrival. He was then called into the first-team, and went on to play several games for the club in the 2008 season. He was then assigned the no. 7 jersey for the 2009 campaign, with manager James Gallagher using McLaughlin right across the midfield and front-line.

=== Derry City ===
He signed for Derry City after the 2010 season, after impressing in games against Derry at both Finn Park and the Brandywell. The move was touted at the end of the season, with McLaughlin signing terms with Stephen Kenny's side in January 2011. He wore the no. 15 shirt for The Candystripes. McLaughlin secured promotion from the League of Ireland First Division with the club in his first season, and won the FAI Cup in his second, netting 17 goals along the way.

=== Nottingham Forest ===
McLaughlin signed with English Championship side Nottingham Forest on 3 January 2013, believed to be for a fee of roughly £160,000. McLaughlin did not make an appearance during the remainder of the 2012–13 season. After a spell out on loan to Bristol City at the start of the 2013 season, McLaughlin made his full Forest debut against Leeds United on 21 April 2014 under caretaker manager Gary Brazil. At the beginning of the 2014–15 season under Stuart Pearce, McLaughlin became a more prominent member of the first team, with four appearances from the bench in Forest's first six games.

As appearances for the first team at Forest became increasingly limited, McLaughlin joined their local rivals Notts County on a one-month emergency loan on 30 September 2014.

==== Southend (loan) ====
After a spell back at Forest, McLaughlin signed with Southend United until the end of the 2014–15 season. His debut for The Shrimpers was away at Bury, however this lasted just six minutes as the game was abandoned due to torrential rain, and his next game was at home to Mansfield Town which Southend won 2–0, and McLaughlin played 87 minutes. He scored twice in his spell for Southend, the first was in a 2–0 win over Newport County and the second helped Southend to Wembley Stadium as he scored in extra time of the League Two play-off semi-final against Stevenage. He went on to play an hour in the final against Wycombe Wanderers, which Southend eventually won 7–6 on penalties meaning that they won promotion to League One. After that game McLaughlin's loan spell ended, although having been released by Nottingham Forest, he has been linked with a permanent move back to Southend.

=== Southend United ===
On 27 August 2015, McLaughlin joined Southend United on a permanent deal, signing a two-year deal. McLaughlin made his debut as a substitute against Coventry City on 31 August 2015. He left at the end of the 2019–20 season after Southend was relegated.

=== Mansfield Town ===
On 11 September 2020, McLaughlin signed with Mansfield Town on a short-term deal.

After missing out on promotion with defeat in the 2022 EFL League Two play-off final, McLaughlin signed a new two-year contract in July 2022.

On 2 June 2025, the club announced he had signed a new one-year contract. On 19 May 2026, the club announced the player had extended his contract.

== Career statistics ==
As of match played 7 November 2023

Appearances and goals by club, season and competition
Club	Season	League			National cup		League cup		Other		Total	
Club	Season	Division	Apps	Goals	Apps	Goals	Apps	Goals	Apps	Goals	Apps	Goals
Finn Harps	2009	League of Ireland First Division	16	1	0	0	0	0	—		16	1
Finn Harps	2010	League of Ireland First Division	32	1	1	0	1	0	—		34	1
Finn Harps	Total		48	2	1	0	1	0	—		50	2
Derry City	2011	League of Ireland Premier Division	33	3	1	0	4	3	—		38	6
Derry City	2012	League of Ireland Premier Division	24	10	6	4	2	0	7 (Note: Appearances in the Setanta Sports Cup)	3	39	17
Derry City	Total		57	13	7	4	6	3	7	3	77	23
Nottingham Forest	2012–13	Championship	0	0	0	0	0	0	—		0	0
Nottingham Forest	2013–14	Championship	3	0	0	0	0	0	—		3	0
Nottingham Forest	2014–15	Championship	6	0	1	0	2	0	—		9	0
Nottingham Forest	Total		9	0	1	0	2	0	—		12	0
Bristol City (loan)	2013–14	League One	5	0	0	0	1	0	1 (Note: Appearances in the Football League Trophy)	0	7	0
Notts County (loan)	2014–15	League One	13	0	0	0	0	0	3	1	16	1
Southend United (loan)	2014–15	League Two	6	1	0	0	0	0	3 (Note: Appearances in the League Two play-offs)	1	9	2
Southend United	2015–16	League One	17	1	1	0	0	0	0	0	18	1
Southend United	2016–17	League One	34	7	1	0	1	1	2 (Note: Appearance(s) in EFL Trophy)	0	38	8
Southend United	2017–18	League One	45	6	1	0	1	0	4	1	51	7
Southend United	2018–19	League One	30	1	3	1	1	0	5	1	39	3
Southend United	2019–20	League One	27	4	1	0	1	0	2	0	31	4
Southend United	Total		153	19	7	1	4	1	13	2	177	23
Mansfield Town	2020–21	League Two	36	4	3	1	0	0	1	0	40	5
Mansfield Town	2021–22	League Two	43	7	3	0	1	0	3	1	50	8
Mansfield Town	2022–23	League Two	25	1	1	0	1	0	4	0	31	1
Mansfield Town	2023–24	League Two	0	0	1	0	1	0	1	0	3	0
Mansfield Town	Total		104	12	8	1	3	0	9	1	124	14
Career total			395	47	24	6	17	4	36	8	472	65

== Honours ==
Derry City

- League of Ireland Cup: 2011
- FAI Cup: 2012

Southend United

- Football League Two play-offs: 2015

Mansfield Town

- EFL League Two third-place promotion: 2023–24

Individual

- PFAI Premier Division Team of the Year: 2012
- Mansfield Town Player of the Season: 2021–22
