= Ethan Hill =

English footballer

Personal information
- Date of birth: 12 September 2002 (age 24)
- Place of birth: Leicester, England
- Height: 1.80 m (5 ft 11 in)
- Position: Midfielder

Team information
- Current team: Mansfield Town

Youth career
- 20??–2020: Nottingham Forest
- 2020–2021: Mansfield Town

Senior career*
Years	Team	Apps	(Gls)
2021–	Mansfield Town	0	(0)
- * Club domestic league appearances and goals as of 00:00, 16 October 2021 (UTC)

Ethan Hill (born 12 September 2002) is an English professional footballer who plays as a midfielder for EFL League One club Mansfield Town.

== Career ==
Hill turned professional at Mansfield Town in May 2021. He made his senior debut on 31 August under the stewardship of Nigel Clough, in a 3–1 defeat at Harrogate Town in the EFL Trophy.

== Style of play ==
Mansfield Town academy manager Richard Cooper described Hill as "a very technically astute midfield player... a gifted midfield player [with] an eye for a pass".

== Career statistics ==
As of match played 16 October 2021

Appearances and goals by club, season and competition
Club	Season	League			FA Cup		EFL Cup		Other		Total	
Club	Season	Division	Apps	Goals	Apps	Goals	Apps	Goals	Apps	Goals	Apps	Goals
Mansfield Town	2021–22	EFL League Two	0	0	0	0	0	0	1 (Note: Appearance/s in the EFL Trophy.)	0	1	0
Career total			0	0	0	0	0	0	1	0	1	0
