= Jason Law =

English footballer (born 1999)

Personal information
- Full name: Jason Law
- Date of birth: 26 April 1999 (age 27)
- Place of birth: Nottingham, England
- Height: 5 ft 11 in (1.80 m)
- Position: Attacking midfielder

Team information
- Current team: Stamford

Youth career
- Burton Albion
- Derby County

Senior career*
Years	Team	Apps	(Gls)
201?–2015	Carlton Town		
2015–2023	Mansfield Town	43	(1)
2016	→ Sutton Coldfield Town (loan)		
2017–2018	→ Gresley (loan)	26	(3)
2018	→ Hednesford Town (loan)		
2019	→ Leek Town (loan)	1	(1)
2020	→ Kettering Town (loan)	4	(1)
2023–	Scunthorpe United	24	(2)
2025	→ Spalding United (loan)	?	(?)
2025–	Stamford	1	(0)
- * Club domestic league appearances and goals as of 15:53, 9 August 2025 (UTC)

Jason Law (born 26 April 1999) is an English professional footballer who plays as a Attacking Midfielder for Stamford.

== Career ==
A former Academy player at both Burton Albion and Derby County, Law joined Mansfield Town from local side Carlton Town in December 2015, having scored four goals in three first-team games for the "Millers". He appeared on the Mansfield first-team bench later in the 2015–16 season. He was regularly picked by Academy manager John Dempster as the "Stags" youth-team won the EFL Youth Alliance in the 2016–17 and 2017–18 campaigns. On 2 September 2016, Law was loaned to Sutton Coldfield Town. On 9 August 2017, he joined Gresley of the Northern Premier League Division One South on a six-month loan deal. He made his debut for the "Moatmen" three days later, away at Cleethorpes Town. He scored three goals in 26 appearances for Gresley. He made his first-team debut for Mansfield on 13 November, helping the club to record a 3–2 victory over Scunthorpe United in an EFL Trophy group stage game at Field Mill.

On 7 February 2018, Law joined Hednesford Town F.C. on a loan deal for one month. On 10 March 2019, the deal was extended until the end of the season. On 3 October 2019 Law joined Leek Town. In January 2020, he went on loan again, this time to Kettering Town F.C. for one month. The deal was later extended until 9 March.

Law was in contract discussions with Mansfield at the end of the 2022–23 season, instead opting to join recently relegated National League North club Scunthorpe United on a two-year deal.

In February 2025, Law joined Spalding United on an initial one-month loan deal.

== Career statistics ==
As of end of 2023–24 season

Appearances and goals by club, season and competition
Club	Season	League			FA Cup		EFL Cup		Other		Total	
Club	Season	Division	Apps	Goals	Apps	Goals	Apps	Goals	Apps	Goals	Apps	Goals
Mansfield Town	2015–16	League Two	0	0	0	0	0	0	0	0	0	0
Mansfield Town	2016–17	League Two	0	0	0	0	0	0	0	0	0	0
Mansfield Town	2017–18	League Two	0	0	0	0	0	0	0	0	0	0
Mansfield Town	2018–19	League Two	0	0	0	0	0	0	1 (Note: Appearance(s) in the Football League Trophy)	0	1	0
Mansfield Town	2019–20	League Two	0	0	0	0	0	0	1	0	1	0
Mansfield Town	2020–21	League Two	17	1	0	0	0	0	1	0	18	1
Mansfield Town	2021–22	League Two	5	0	1	0	1	0	3	0	10	0
Mansfield Town	2022–23	League Two	21	0	0	0	0	0	1	0	22	0
Mansfield Town	Total		43	1	1	0	1	0	7	0	52	1
Kettering Town (loan)	2019–20	National League North	4	1	0	0	—		0	0	4	1
Scunthorpe United	2023–24	National League North	16	2	0	0	—		1 (Note: Appearance(s) in FA Trophy)	0	17	2
Career total (Note: Statistics for Carlton Town and Gresley not known)			63	4	1	0	1	0	8	0	73	4

== Honours ==
Scunthorpe United

- National League North play-offs: 2025
