= Tyrese Sinclair =

English footballer (born 2001)

Personal information
- Full name: Tyrese Sinclair
- Date of birth: 4 February 2001 (age 25)
- Place of birth: Kingston upon Thames, England
- Position: Attacking midfielder

Team information
- Current team: Livingston
- Number: 7

Youth career
- Blackburn Rovers
- 2017–2019: Mansfield Town

Senior career*
Years	Team	Apps	(Gls)
2019–2022	Mansfield Town	33	(3)
2019	→ Radcliffe (loan)	18	(7)
2020	→ Basford United (loan)	1	(0)
2022	→ Scunthorpe United (loan)	14	(0)
2022–2024	Rochdale	64	(13)
2023	→ Altrincham (loan)	11	(5)
2024–2026	York City	57	(7)
2025–2026	→ Solihull Moors (loan)	10	(3)
2026	→ Hartlepool United (loan)	15	(5)
2026–	Livingston	2	(0)
- * Club domestic league appearances and goals as of 18:37, 18 August 2026 (UTC)

Tyrese Sinclair (born 4 February 2001) is an English professional footballer who plays as an attacking midfielder for Scottish Championship club Livingston.

== Career ==
=== Mansfield Town ===
Sinclair was released by Blackburn Rovers in 2017, and took part in a EFL trial day in February 2017. He later signed for Mansfield Town, where he was their 2018–19 youth Player of the Year, and where he turned professional in July 2019. He made his senior debut on 27 August 2019 in a Football League Trophy game against Everton U21s. Later that month he moved on loan to non-league club Radcliffe, where his father worked as assistant manager. In January 2020 he moved on loan to Basford United.

He scored his first goal for Mansfield on 9 April 2021.

He moved on loan to Scunthorpe United in January 2022.

Sinclair was released by Mansfield Town at the end of the 2021–22 season.

=== Rochdale ===
On 19 July 2022, Sinclair joined Rochdale on a two-year deal following a successful trial period.

On 2 February 2023, Sinclair signed for National League club Altrincham on loan until the end of the season. He was recalled on 13 April.

Sinclair departed Rochdale on a free transfer at the end of the 2023–24 season.

=== York City ===
On 30 May 2024, Sinclair joined York City upon the expiry of his contract with Rochdale.

On 24 October 2025, Sinclair joined fellow National League side Solihull Moors on loan until 3 January 2026. He moved on loan to Hartlepool United in January 2026.

Following York City's promotion, he was released upon the expiry of his contract at the end of the 2025–26 season.

=== Livingston ===
On 14 May 2026, Sinclair agreed to join Scottish Championship club Livingston on a two-year pre-contract agreement.

== Personal life ==
His father is the retired Jamaican international footballer Frank Sinclair.

== Career statistics ==
As of end of 2025–26 season

Appearances and goals by club, season and competition
Club	Season	League			FA Cup		League Cup		Other		Total	
Club	Season	Division	Apps	Goals	Apps	Goals	Apps	Goals	Apps	Goals	Apps	Goals
Mansfield Town	2019–20	League Two	0	0	0	0	0	0	1 (Note: Appearance(s) in the Football League Trophy.)	0	1	0
Mansfield Town	2020–21	League Two	19	3	0	0	1	0	3	0	23	3
Mansfield Town	2021–22	League Two	14	0	2	0	1	0	3	1	20	1
Mansfield Town	Total		33	3	2	0	2	0	7	1	44	4
Radcliffe (loan)	2019–20	Northern Premier League	18	7	0	0	0	0	4 (Note: One appearance and one goal in the Integro League Cup; one appearance in the Manchester Premier Cup; one appearance in the FA Trophy; one appearance in the FA Challenge Trophy.)	1	22	8
Basford United (loan)	2020–21	Northern Premier League	1	0	0	0	0	0	0	0	1	0
Scunthorpe United (loan)	2021–22	League Two	14	0	0	0	0	0	0	0	14	0
Rochdale	2022–23	League Two	32	3	1	0	2	0	3	0	38	3
Rochdale	2023–24	National League	32	10	1	0	—		1 (Note: Appearance(s) in the FA Trophy.)	1	34	11
Rochdale	Total		64	13	2	0	2	0	4	1	72	14
Altrincham (loan)	2022–23	National League	11	5	0	0	0	0	3	1	14	6
York City	2024–25	National League	45	7	2	1	0	0	2	1	49	9
York City	2025–26	National League	12	0	0	0	0	0	0	0	12	0
York City	Total		57	7	2	1	0	0	2	1	61	9
Solihull Moors (loan)	2025–26	National League	10	3	0	0	0	0	1	0	11	3
Hartlepool United (loan)	2025–26	National League	15	5	0	0	0	0	0	0	15	5
Career total			223	43	6	1	4	0	21	5	254	49

== Honours ==
York City

- National League: 2025–26
