= Jaden Charles =

Association footballer (born 2002)

Personal information
- Full name: Jaden Gary Charles
- Date of birth: 25 January 2002 (age 24)
- Position: Left-back

Team information
- Current team: Rushall Olympic

Youth career
- 2010–2020: Derby County

Senior career*
| Years | Team | Apps | (Gls) |
| 2021–2022 | Mansfield Town | 2 | (0) |
| 2021 | → York City (loan) | 4 | (0) |
| 2021 | → Hereford (loan) | 2 | (0) |
| 2021 | → Nuneaton Borough (loan) | 20 | (2) |
| 2022–2024 | Nuneaton Borough | 33 | (4) |
| 2024– | Rushall Olympic | 32 | (3) |

International career
| 2019 | Republic of Ireland U18 | 3 | (0) |
- * Club domestic league appearances and goals as of 14:36, 22 January 2024 (UTC)

Jaden Charles (born 25 January 2002) is a professional footballer who plays as a left-back for Rushall Olympic. He is the son of former England international Gary Charles. He previously played youth-team football for Derby County, where he won the Professional Development League U18 Division 1 title in 2018–19.

== Club career ==
=== Youth years ===
Charles spent ten years at the Academy at Derby County, scoring three goals and providing six assists in 31 games for the under-18 team and featuring once for the under-23 team and playing three times in the UEFA Youth League. Derby won the Professional Development League U18 Division 1 title in the 2018–19 season, with Charles contributing one goal from 13 games. He scored a free-kick against Newcastle United U18 in February 2020 that saw him nominated for the League Football Education's Goal of the Month award. He chose to leave the club in August 2020.

=== Mansfield Town ===
On 24 March 2021, he signed with EFL League Two side Mansfield Town on a contract to run until the end of the 2020–21 season. Manager Nigel Clough gave Charles his senior debut on 1 May 2021, when he came on as 81st-minute substitute for Stephen Quinn in a 4–1 victory over Oldham Athletic at Field Mill.

==== York City (loan) ====
In August 2021, National League North outfit York City announced Charles on a one-month loan. He made his debut for the club in York's league defeat against Gloucester City the very same day, playing the full 90 minutes. He returned to his parent club on the 16th of September, having played four matches for York.

==== Hereford (loan) ====
On 15 October 2021, Charles joined National League North club Hereford on a one-month loan deal.

=== Nuneaton Borough ===
In December 2021, Southern Football League club Nuneaton Borough announced the signing of Charles on an initial one-month loan. He made his debut for the club against Royston Town completing a full 90 minutes. On 5 February 2022, Charles scored his first goal for the club directly from a corner against Alvechurch and shortly after this had his loan spell extended until the end of the 2021–22 season. On 11 June 2022, Charles signed for the club on a permanent basis.

=== Rushall Olympic ===
In January 2024, following Nuneaton's withdrawal from the league, Charles joined National League North club Rushall Olympic.

== International career ==
Though born in England, Charles has represented the Republic of Ireland at under-18 level during Andy Reid's management spell in 2019. He made his debut as a 75th-minute substitute for Louie Watson in a 4–0 friendly defeat to Turkey.

== Style of play ==
Charles is a left-back with pace and good passing ability, whose technical skills make him a dead-ball specialist.

== Personal life ==
He is the son of former England international Gary Charles.

== Career statistics ==
As of match played 1 May 2021

Appearances and goals by club, season and competition
| Club | Season | League | | | FA Cup | | EFL Cup | | Other | | Total | |
| Club | Season | Division | Apps | Goals | Apps | Goals | Apps | Goals | Apps | Goals | Apps | Goals |
|---|---|---|---|---|---|---|---|---|---|---|---|---|
| Mansfield Town | 2020–21 | EFL League Two | 2 | 0 | 0 | 0 | 0 | 0 | 0 | 0 | 2 | 0 |
| York City (loan) | 2021–22 | National League North | 4 | 0 | — | | — | | — | | 4 | 0 |
| Nuneaton Borough | 2021–22 | Southern Premier Central | 17 | 1 | — | | — | | — | | 17 | 1 |

== Honours ==
Derby County U18

- Professional Development League U18 Division 1: 2018–19
