= Nathan Caine =

English footballer

Personal information
- Date of birth: 20 November 2002 (age 24)
- Place of birth: Stockport, England
- Height: 1.82 m (6 ft 0 in)
- Position: Forward

Team information
- Current team: Stalybridge Celtic

Youth career
- 2013–2019: Rochdale
- 2019–2021: Mansfield Town

Senior career*
Years	Team	Apps	(Gls)
2020–2022	Mansfield Town	0	(0)
2021	→ Nuneaton Borough (loan)	5	(1)
2022	→ Ilkeston Town (loan)	2	(0)
2022	→ Sutton Coldfield Town (loan)	10	(1)
2022	Stafford Rangers	5	(0)
2022–2023	Stalybridge Celtic	11	(2)
2023–	Atherton Collieries	32	(4)
- * Club domestic league appearances and goals as of 13:16, 5 July 2023 (UTC)

Nathan Caine (born 20 November 2002) is an English professional footballer who plays as a forward for Atherton Collieries.

== Playing career ==
Caine made his senior debut for Mansfield Town on 10 November 2020, coming on as an 88th-minute substitute for Jamie Reid in a 2–1 victory at Scunthorpe United in the EFL Trophy. He turned professional at Mansfield Town in May 2021 after scoring some important goals for academy manager Richard Cooper. He joined Southern League Premier Division Central side Nuneaton Borough on a one-month loan starting on 22 September. On 6 January 2022, Caine joined Northern Premier League Division One Midlands side Ilkeston Town on a one-month loan deal. On 25 February 2022, Caine joined Northern Premier League Division One Midlands side Sutton Coldfield Town on a one-month loan deal. On 25 March 2022, the loan was extended for the remainder of the 2021–22 season. Caine was released by Mansfield at the end of the 2021–22 season.

Following his release from Mansfield, Caine joined Stafford Rangers before transferring to Stalybridge Celtic in October 2022. In July 2023, he joined Atherton Collieries.

== Style of play ==
Caine is a forward with clever movement.

== Statistics ==
As of match played 24 December 2021

Club	Season	League			FA Cup		EFL Cup		Other		Total	
Club	Season	Division	Apps	Goals	Apps	Goals	Apps	Goals	Apps	Goals	Apps	Goals
Mansfield Town	2020–21	EFL League Two	0	0	0	0	0	0	1 (Note: Appearance/s in the EFL Trophy.)	0	1	0
Mansfield Town	2021–22	EFL League Two	0	0	0	0	0	0	2	0	2	1
Mansfield Town	Total		0	0	0	0	0	0	3	1	3	1
Nuneaton Borough (loan)	2021–22	Southern League; Premier Division Central	5	1	0	0	0	0	0	0	5	1
Career total			5	1	0	0	0	0	5	1	8	2
