= George Maris =

English footballer

Personal information
- Full name: George Thomas Maris
- Date of birth: 6 March 1996 (age 30)
- Place of birth: Sheffield, England
- Height: 5 ft 11 in (1.80 m)
- Position: Midfielder

Team information
- Current team: Mansfield Town
- Number: 10

Youth career
- 2011–2014: Barnsley

Senior career*
Years	Team	Apps	(Gls)
2014–2016	Barnsley	3	(0)
2015	→ Nuneaton Town (loan)	9	(0)
2015	→ Guiseley (loan)	7	(0)
2016	→ Lincoln City (loan)	13	(2)
2016–2020	Cambridge United	132	(20)
2020–	Mansfield Town	183	(23)
- * Club domestic league appearances and goals as of 7 May 2025 (UTC)

George Thomas Maris (born 6 March 1996) is an English professional footballer who plays as a central midfielder for EFL League One club Mansfield Town.

== Career ==
Maris began his career at Barnsley at under-15 level, signing his first professional contract on 29 May 2014 after a 20-goal season for the under-18s.

On 30 January 2015, he went on a one-month youth loan to Nuneaton Town in the Conference Premier. He started on his senior debut the following day, in a 1–0 loss at Forest Green Rovers. On 28 February, he played in their 1–0 win over Welling United two days after his loan had expired; this resulted in Nuneaton receiving a three-point deduction. He played nine matches in total, without scoring, in a season which ended with relegation.

Maris was first included in a Barnsley matchday squad on 25 April 2015, for their League One fixture against fellow Yorkshiremen Bradford City at Valley Parade; he replaced Luke Berry for the final 13 minutes of a 1–0 loss. Eight days later he made his first professional start at Oakwell, as his team concluded their season with a 5–0 rout of Rochdale.

On 1 February 2016, Maris was signed on loan for the rest of the season by Lincoln City.

On 3 June 2016 Maris signed a one-year deal with League Two club Cambridge United. He made his debut for the club against Barnet F.C on 6 August 2016, a 1–1 draw at the Abbey Stadium. Maris scored his first goal for the club away at Wycombe Wanderers in a 2–1 loss 19 November 2016. He later signed a contract extension for a further two years in April 2017.

He was offered a new contract by Cambridge United at the end of the 2018–19 season.

On 28 July 2020, Maris signed a two-year contract with League Two side Mansfield Town after joining the club for an undisclosed fee.

On 19 May 2026, Mansfield said the player had signed a contract extension.

== Career statistics ==
As of 02 March 2024

Appearances and goals by club, season and competition
Club	Season	League			FA Cup		League Cup		Other		Total	
Club	Season	Division	Apps	Goals	Apps	Goals	Apps	Goals	Apps	Goals	Apps	Goals
Barnsley	2014–15	League One	2	0	0	0	0	0	0	0	2	0
Barnsley	2015–16	League One	1	0	0	0	0	0	0	0	1	0
Barnsley	Total		3	0	0	0	0	0	0	0	3	0
Nuneaton Borough (loan)	2014–15	Conference Premier	9	0	0	0	—		0	0	9	0
Guiseley (loan)	2015–16	National League	7	0	0	0	—		0	0	7	0
Lincoln City (loan)	2015–16	National League	13	2	0	0	—		0	0	13	2
Cambridge United	2016–17	League Two	23	4	1	0	1	0	2 (Note: Appearance(s) in EFL Trophy)	0	27	4
Cambridge United	2017–18	League Two	40	10	1	0	0	0	1	0	42	10
Cambridge United	2018–19	League Two	39	5	1	1	1	0	3	1	44	7
Cambridge United	2019–20	League Two	30	1	2	0	2	0	3	0	37	1
Cambridge United	Total		132	20	5	1	4	0	9	1	150	22
Mansfield Town	2020–21	League Two	40	1	3	0	1	0	0	0	44	1
Mansfield Town	2021–22	League Two	37	3	3	0	1	0	2 (Note: Appearance(s) in League Two play-offs)	0	43	3
Mansfield Town	2022–23	League Two	34	4	2	0	1	0	4	1	41	5
Mansfield Town	2023–24	League Two	32	9	1	0	4	0	3	0	40	9
Mansfield Town	Total		144	17	9	0	7	0	9	1	169	18
Career total			308	39	15	1	11	0	18	2	352	42

== Honors ==
Mansfield Town

- EFL League Two third-place promotion: 2023–24
