= Keaton Ward =

English footballer

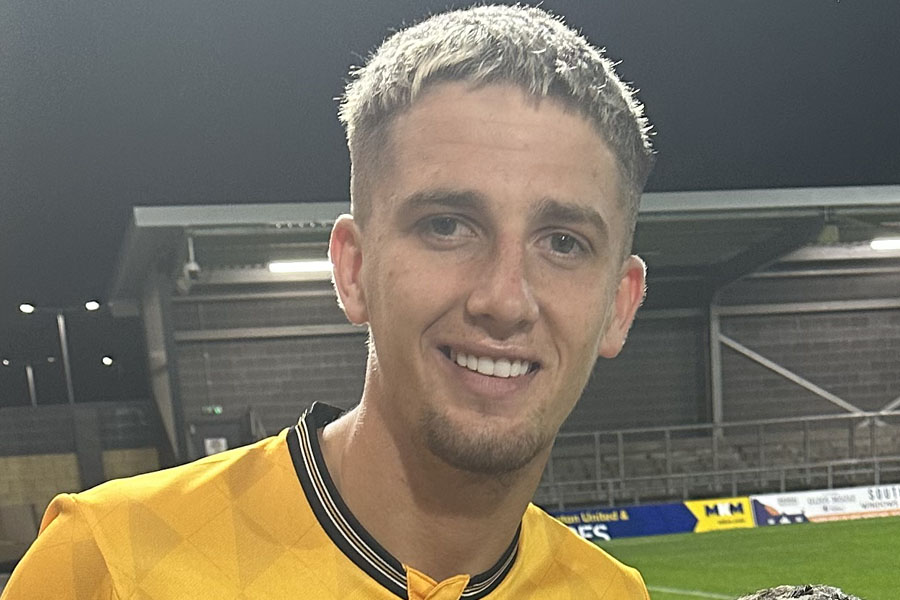
- Ward in August 2023

Personal information
- Full name: Keaton Ward
- Date of birth: 4 May 2000 (age 26)
- Place of birth: Mansfield, England
- Height: 6 ft 0 in (1.83 m)
- Position: Midfielder

Team information
- Current team: Barrow
- Number: 10

Youth career
- –2019: Mansfield Town

Senior career*
Years	Team	Apps	(Gls)
2019	Mansfield Town	0	(0)
2019	→ AFC Mansfield (loan)	5	(4)
2019–2021	Barnsley	0	(0)
2020	→ FC United of Manchester (loan)		
2020	→ Gainsborough Trinity (loan)	4	(1)
2020–2021	→ Ilkeston Town (loan)	1	(1)
2021–2022	Mansfield Town	15	(0)
2022	→ Telford United (loan)	22	(1)
2022–2023	Kettering Town	45	(5)
2023–2025	Boston United	86	(10)
2025–2026	Altrincham	22	(2)
2026	Gateshead	18	(5)
2026–	Barrow	2	(1)
- * Club domestic league appearances and goals as of 11:58, 29 August 2026 (UTC)

Keaton Ward (born 4 May 2000) is an English footballer who plays as a midfielder for National League club Barrow.

== Early life ==
Ward was born in Sutton-in-Ashfield.

He played for the youth teams at his local club Mansfield Town.

== Career ==
After playing youth football for Mansfield Town, and playing for AFC Mansfield on a one-month loan in early 2019, he signed for Barnsley in July 2019 following a trial period at the club. In March 2020, Ward joined FC United of Manchester on a youth loan. In October 2020, he joined Gainsborough Trinity on loan. He made his debut for the club on 24 October 2020 in a 2–1 defeat away to Radcliffe. In December 2020, he joined Ilkeston Town on loan until the end of the season. On 2 February 2021, his contract with Barnsley was terminated by mutual consent.

In March 2021, he returned to Mansfield Town on a contract until the end of the season. He made his first professional appearance on 6 March 2021 as a 79th-minute substitute in a 2–0 defeat away at Barrow. He made 7 appearances for Mansfield Town across the 2020–21 season.

Ward joined National League North club AFC Telford United on a one-month loan deal in January 2022.

Following his release from Mansfield Town Ward joined National League North club Kettering Town. Following Kettering's relegation at the end of the 2022–23 season, he returned to the National League North with Boston United.Ward was awarded man of the match on Tuesday 15 August 2023 when Boston United were defeated by Tamworth FC.

In May 2025, Ward joined National League side Altrincham following his departure from Boston United. In January 2026, he joined fellow National League side Gateshead.

In August 2026 he left Gateshead having signed for Barrow.

== Honours ==
Boston United

- National League North play-offs: 2024
