= Sam Allison =

English football referee

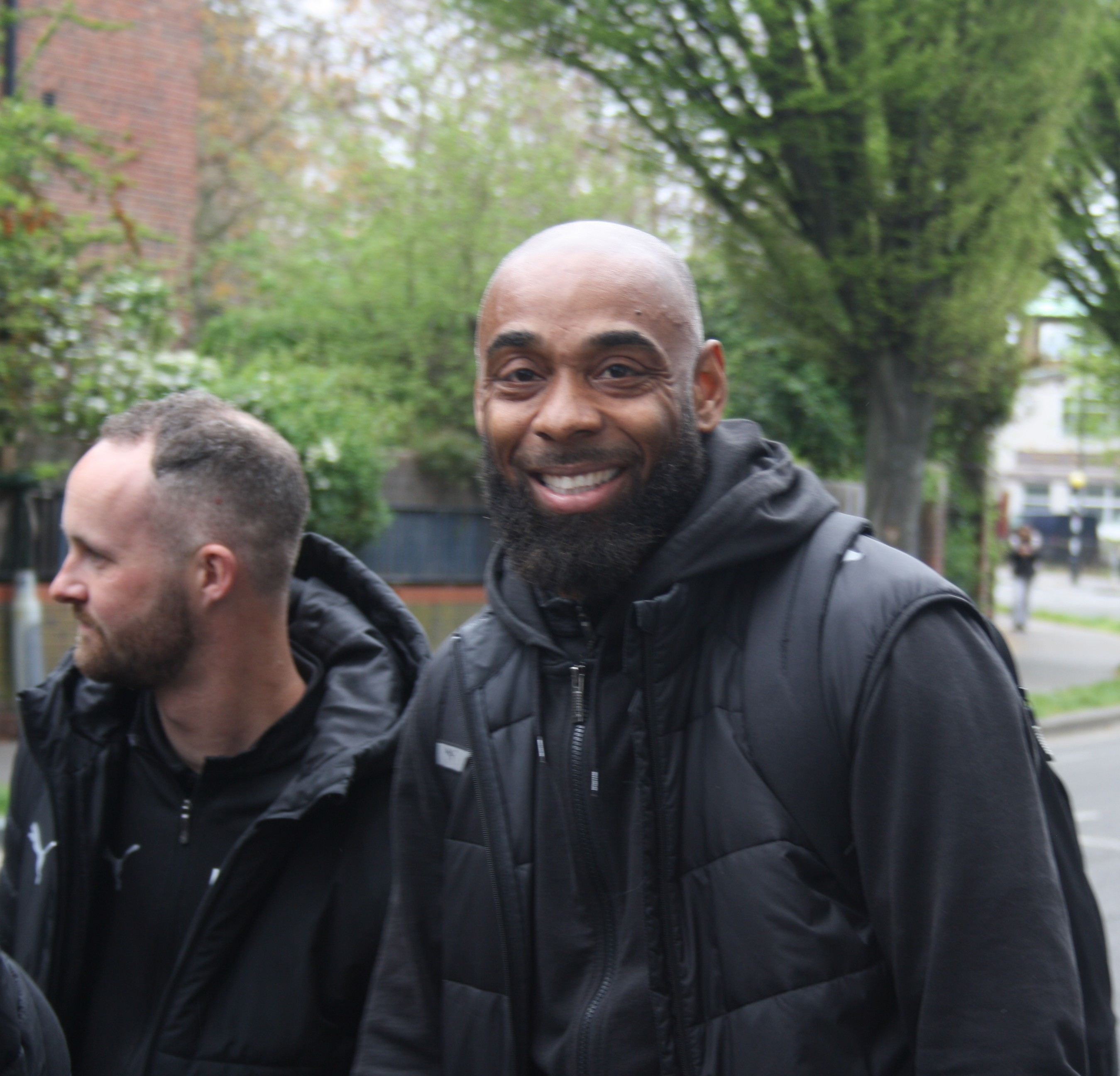
- Allison (right) in 2026

Personal information
- Date of birth: 1 October 1980 (age 46)
- Place of birth: Chippenham, England
- Position: Midfielder

Youth career
- Swindon Town

Senior career*
Years	Team	Apps	(Gls)
	Bristol City	0	(0)
	Bournemouth	0	(0)
	Exeter City	0	(0)
2001–2002	Clevedon Town	22	(7)
2002–2003	Bath City		
2003	Salisbury City	4	(0)
2003–2011	Chippenham Town	188	(34)
2011–2013	Frome Town	9	(0)
Total		223+	(41+)

International career
- England schoolboys
- Great Britain schoolboys
- * Club domestic league appearances and goals

Sam Allison (born 1 October 1980) is an English professional football referee and former player who officiates in the English Football League.

== Playing career ==
Allison played as a midfielder for Swindon Town, Bristol City, Bournemouth, Exeter City, Clevedon Town, Bath City, Salisbury City, Chippenham Town, and Frome Town, as well as for England and Great Britain schoolboys.

== Refereeing career ==
Allison worked as a firefighter and as a match official in the English Football League.

On 26 December 2023 he became the first black referee in the Premier League in 15 years, since Uriah Rennie.
