= Lewis Brunt =

English footballer

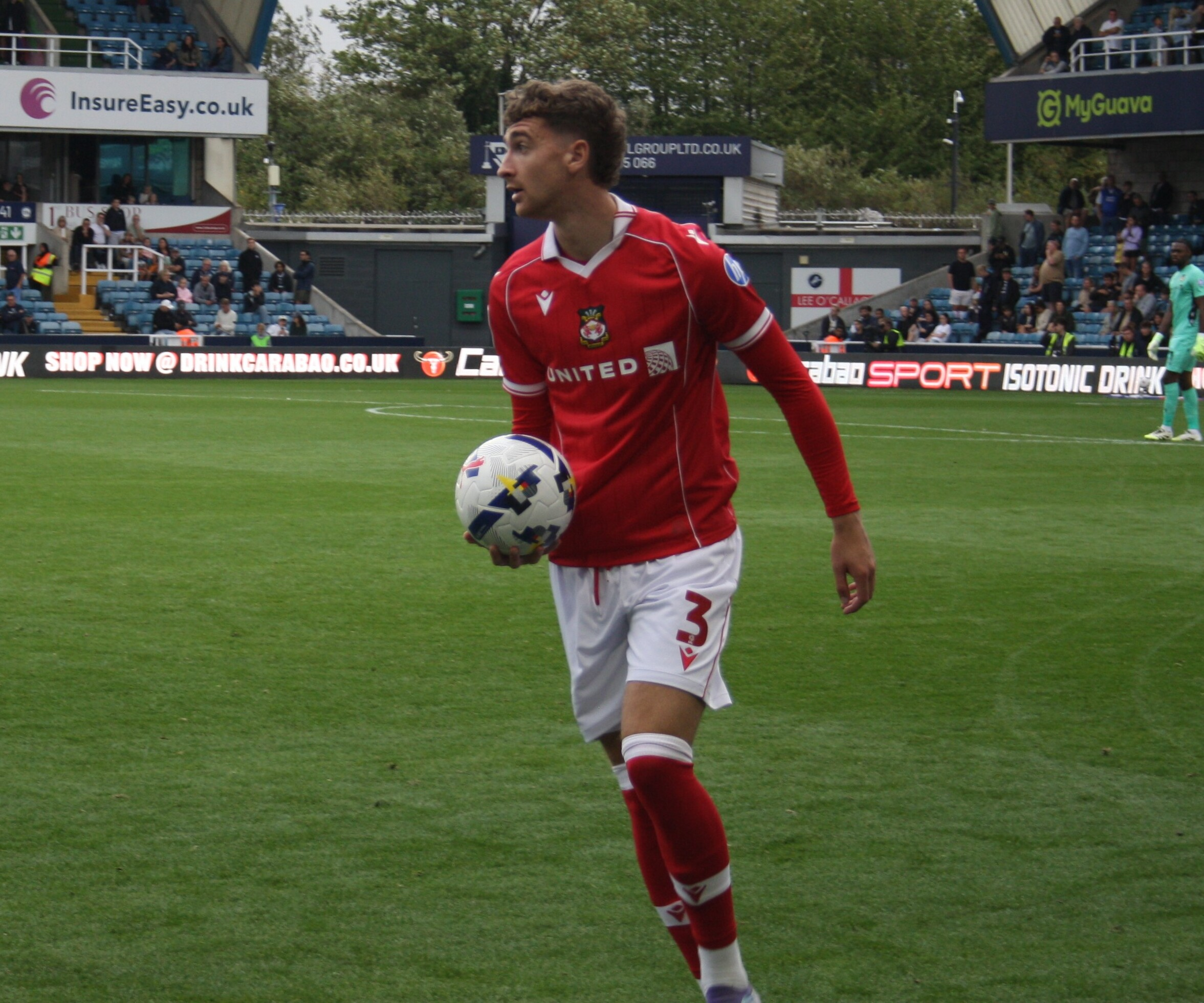
- Brunt in 2025

Personal information
- Full name: Lewis Ray Brunt
- Date of birth: 6 November 2000 (age 25)
- Place of birth: Lichfield, England
- Height: 1.87 m (6 ft 2 in)
- Position: Centre-back

Team information
- Current team: Bolton Wanderers
- Number: 5

Youth career
- –2019: Aston Villa

Senior career*
Years	Team	Apps	(Gls)
2019–2021	Aston Villa	0	(0)
2020	→ Gloucester City (loan)	6	(2)
2020–2021	→ Gloucester City (loan)	6	(1)
2021–2024	Leicester City	2	(0)
2023–2024	→ Mansfield Town (loan)	34	(2)
2024–2026	Wrexham	31	(0)
2026–	Bolton Wanderers	5	(0)
- * Club domestic league appearances and goals as of 06:48, 28 September 2026 (UTC)

Lewis Brunt (born 6 November 2000) is an English professional footballer who plays as a defender for EFL Championship club Bolton Wanderers. Mainly a centre-back, he can also play as a left-back or defensive midfielder or right-back.

Brunt is a product of the Aston Villa Academy and also played for Gloucester City on loan twice between 2020 and 2021.

== Career ==
=== Aston Villa ===
Brunt started his career at Aston Villa. After playing for the Under-18s and Under-23s, he was given his first professional contract by Villa in November 2018. On 23 January 2020, Brunt signed for National League North side Gloucester City on loan. On 4 June 2021, Aston Villa announced that Brunt had not been offered a new contract at the end of his existing deal.

=== Leicester City ===
In August 2021, Brunt signed for Leicester City. He made his first team debut on 8 January 2022 against Watford in the FA Cup. On 1 May 2022, Brunt made his Premier League debut, coming on as a 67th-minute substitute for Boubakary Soumaré in a 3–1 away defeat to Tottenham Hotspur.

Brunt won Men's Development Squad Player of the Season for the 2021–22 season. In August 2022, he signed a new three-year contract with the club.

==== Mansfield Town (loan) ====
On 25 August 2023, Brunt signed for League Two club Mansfield Town on a season-long loan deal. He made his league debut for the club as an 85th-minute substitute during a 3–2 win against Stockport County the following day. A successful season saw Mansfield automatically promoted having finished in third position, Brunt making thirty-four league appearances. Following the end of the season, Mansfield intended to sign the defender on a permanent basis, having an initial bid rejected.

=== Wrexham ===
On 2 July 2024, Brunt signed for League One club Wrexham on a three-year deal for an undisclosed fee. Brunt made his full league debut for the club on 23 November 2024 in a 3–0 win at home to Exeter City. On 8 October 2024, he scored his first and only goal for the club in a 3–0 win over Wolverhampton Wanderers U21 in the EFL Trophy.

=== Bolton Wanderers ===
On 12 August 2026, Brunt signed for EFL Championship club Bolton Wanderers on a four-year deal for an undisclosed fee.

== Career statistics ==
As of 7 March 2026

Appearances and goals by club, season and competition
Club	Season	League			FA Cup		League Cup		Other		Total	
Club	Season	Division	Apps	Goals	Apps	Goals	Apps	Goals	Apps	Goals	Apps	Goals
Gloucester City (loan)	2019–20	National League North	6	2	0	0	—		0	0	6	2
Gloucester City (loan)	2020–21	National League North	6	1	0	0	—		1 (Note: Appearances in FA Trophy)	0	7	1
Gloucester City (loan)	Total		12	3	0	0	0	0	1	0	13	3
Leicester City	2021–22	Premier League	1	0	1	0	0	0	0	0	2	0
Leicester City	2022–23	Premier League	1	0	1	0	0	0	—		2	0
Leicester City	2023–24	Championship	0	0	0	0	0	0	—		0	0
Leicester City	Total		2	0	2	0	0	0	0	0	4	0
Mansfield Town (loan)	2023–24	League Two	34	2	1	0	3	0	2 (Note: Appearances in EFL Trophy)	0	40	2
Wrexham	2024–25	League One	22	0	0	0	1	0	6	1	29	1
Wrexham	2025–26	Championship	9	0	1	0	2	0	—		12	0
Wrexham	Total		31	0	1	0	3	0	6	1	41	1
Bolton Wanderers	2026–27	Championship	5	0	0	0	0	0	—		5	0
Career total			84	5	4	0	6	0	9	1	103	6

== Honours ==
Mansfield Town

- EFL League Two third-place promotion: 2023–24

Wrexham

- EFL League One runner up: 2024-25
