= Ben Quinn =

Irish footballer (born 2004)

Personal information
- Full name: Ben Mark Quinn
- Date of birth: 11 November 2004 (age 21)
- Place of birth: Dublin, Ireland
- Height: 1.73 m (5 ft 8 in)
- Position: Winger

Team information
- Current team: Cliftonville
- Number: 20

Youth career
- Cherry Orchard
- –2019: St Patrick's Athletic
- 2019–2024: Celtic

Senior career*
Years	Team	Apps	(Gls)
2022–2024	Celtic B	55	(22)
2024–2025	Mansfield Town	1	(0)
2025–2026	Portadown	20	(3)
2026–	Cliftonville	13	(5)

International career^{‡}
2018–2019	Republic of Ireland U15	5	(1)
2019	Republic of Ireland U16	1	(1)
2021	Republic of Ireland U18	1	(0)
2024	Republic of Ireland U21	1	(0)
- * Club domestic league appearances and goals as of 13:02, 3 November 2026 (UTC) ‡ National team caps and goals as of 14:25, 25 September 2026 (UTC)

Ben Mark Quinn (born 11 November 2004) is an Irish professional footballer who plays as a winger for NIFL Premiership club Cliftonville.

== Club career ==
=== Youth career ===
Born in Dublin, after playing for Cherry Orchard and St Patrick's Athletic, Quinn signed for Scottish club Celtic in 2019, signing a new contract in April 2023.

=== Mansfield Town ===
After leaving Celtic, Quinn signed for English club Mansfield Town in August 2024. Quinn made his Mansfield debut on 13 August 2024 in a 1–1 draw against Bolton Wanderers in the EFL Cup, being subbed off in the 63rd minute with Davis Keillor-Dunn replacing him. Bolton went on to win the Penalty shoot-out, however.

=== Portadown ===
On 29 September 2025, Quinn signed for NIFL Premiership club Portadown. On 4 October 2025, he made his debut for the club, scoring his first goal in senior football, in a 3–1 win over Glenavon at Shamrock Park.

=== Cliftonville ===
On 19 June 2026, it was announced that Quinn had signed for fellow NIFL Premiership club Cliftonville. On 7 August 2026, he scored the first goal of the season in the league's opening fixture, a 2–1 win at home to Crusaders.

== International career ==
In November 2024, Quinn received his first call up to the Republic of Ireland U21 squad for their two friendlies against Sweden U21 in Marbella, Spain.

== Personal life ==
Quinn is the nephew of Alan Quinn, Stephen Quinn and Keith Quinn and is also related to Joe Redmond who is a cousin once removed, all of which have also played professional football.

== Career statistics ==
As of match played 31 October 2026

Appearances and goals by club, season, and competition
Club	Season	League			National Cup (Note: Includes FA Cup & Irish Cup)		League Cup (Note: Includes EFL Cup & Northern Ireland Football League Cup)		Other		Total	
Club	Season	Division	Apps	Goals	Apps	Goals	Apps	Goals	Apps	Goals	Apps	Goals
Celtic B	2022–23	Lowland Football League	30	11	–		–		2 (Note: Appearance(s) in the Scottish Challenge Cup)	1	32	12
Celtic B	2023–24	Lowland Football League	25	11	–		–		1	0	26	11
Celtic B	Club total		55	22	–		–		3	1	58	23
Mansfield Town	2024–25	EFL League One	1	0	2	1	1	0	3 (Note: Appearance(s) in the EFL Trophy)	2	7	3
Portadown	2025–26	NIFL Premiership	20	3	1	0	1	0	2 (Note: Appearance(s) in the Mid-Ulster Cup)	0	24	3
Cliftonville	2026–27	NIFL Premiership	13	5	0	0	0	0	0	0	13	5
Total			89	30	3	1	2	0	8	3	102	34
