= James Gale (footballer) =

English footballer

Personal information
- Full name: James Henry Wilson Gale
- Date of birth: 20 December 2001 (age 24)
- Place of birth: Nottingham, England
- Height: 1.92 m (6 ft 4 in)
- Position: Forward

Team information
- Current team: Macclesfield
- Number: 19

Youth career
- –2016: Derby County
- Long Eaton United

Senior career*
Years	Team	Apps	(Gls)
2021	Long Eaton United		
2021–2025	Mansfield Town	37	(4)
2022	→ Guiseley (loan)	11	(4)
2024–2025	→ Solihull Moors (loan)	15	(3)
2025	→ Boston United (loan)	20	(3)
2025–2026	Altrincham	23	(4)
2026	Macclesfield	24	(8)
- * Club domestic league appearances and goals as of 10:45, 31 July 2026 (UTC)

James Henry Wilson Gale is an English footballer who plays as a forward for National League North side Macclesfield F.C.

== Career ==
Gale began his career in the Derby County academy, being released aged 14 and joining Long Eaton United.

=== Mansfield Town ===
Gale joined Mansfield Town on 1 September 2021. He made his senior debut for Mansfield Town on 9 November 2021 in the starting line-up for the 6-3 win against Newcastle United Under-21s in the FA Trophy group stage.

In February 2022, Gale joined National League North side Guiseley on a one-month loan deal.

In November 2022 Gale signed a contract with Mansfield Town until the end of the 2023-24 season. On 18 April 2023, he scored his first Mansfield Town goal with what proved to be the winner in a 2–1 victory over Newport County.

Following promotion to League One in the 2023–24 season, Gale signed a new two-year contract. In July 2024, he joined National League side Solihull Moors on a season-long loan deal. He was recalled in January 2025, subsequently joining Boston United, also of the National League, on loan for the remainder of the season.

=== Altrincham ===
On 8 June 2025, Gale signed for National League side Altrincham on a free transfer.

== Career statistics ==
As of end of 2024–25 season

Appearances and goals by club, season and competition
Club	Season	League			FA Cup		League Cup		Other		Total	
Club	Season	Division	Apps	Goals	Apps	Goals	Apps	Goals	Apps	Goals	Apps	Goals
Mansfield Town	2021–22	EFL League Two	3	0	0	0	0	0	1 (Note: Appearances in EFL Trophy)	0	4	0
Mansfield Town	2022–23	EFL League Two	14	3	0	0	1	0	3	1	18	4
Mansfield Town	2023–24	EFL League Two	20	1	1	0	2	0	3	2	26	3
Mansfield Town	2024–25	EFL League One	0	0	0	0	0	0	0	0	0	0
Mansfield Town	Total		37	4	1	0	3	0	7	3	48	7
Guiseley (loan)	2021–22	National League North	11	4	0	0	–		0	0	11	4
Solihull Moors (loan)	2024–25	National League	15	3	3	0	–		0	0	18	3
Boston United (loan)	2024–25	National League	20	3	0	0	–		2 (Note: 1 appearance in FA Trophy, 1 appearance in National League Cup)	0	22	3
Career total			83	14	4	0	3	0	9	3	99	17

== Honours ==
Mansfield Town

- EFL League Two third-place promotion: 2023–24
