= Calum Macdonald (footballer) =

English footballer

Personal information
- Full name: Calum Ross Macdonald
- Date of birth: 18 December 1997 (age 28)
- Place of birth: Nottingham, England
- Position: Left back

Team information
- Current team: Matlock Town

Youth career
- Arnold Town
- Derby County

Senior career*
Years	Team	Apps	(Gls)
2016–2019	Derby County	0	(0)
2017–2018	→ Barrow (loan)	21	(1)
2019–2021	Blackpool	12	(0)
2020–2021	→ Tranmere Rovers (loan)	19	(0)
2021–2022	Tranmere Rovers	20	(1)
2022–2023	Stockport County	10	(0)
2023	Bristol Rovers	4	(0)
2023–2025	Mansfield Town	26	(1)
2025–	Matlock Town	0	(0)

International career
2016	Scotland U21	2	(0)
- * Club domestic league appearances and goals as of 09:58, 5 November 2025 (UTC)

Calum Ross Macdonald (born 18 December 1997) is a professional footballer who plays as a left back for Northern Premier League Division One East club Matlock Town.

== Club career ==
In 2016, Macdonald signed his first professional contract with Derby County. In the 2016–17 season, Macdonald was named Derby's under-23 Player of the Year. During the 2017–18 season, Macdonald spent time out on loan to National League club Barrow. On 27 August 2019, after featuring on Derby's first team bench eight times in the previous season, Macdonald signed for Blackpool on an initial two-year contract. On 3 September 2019, Macdonald made his debut for Blackpool in a 5–1 EFL Trophy win against Morecambe.

Macdonald joined Tranmere Rovers on a season-long loan on 19 August 2020. On 1 February 2021, the loan was made permanent as Macdonald signed an 18-month contract with Tranmere Rovers.

On 8 October 2022, Macdonald joined Stockport County on a short-term contract until January 2023. Upon the expiration of this short-term deal, he signed a new contract to keep him at the club until the end of the season. On 31 January 2023, he joined League One club Bristol Rovers on a contract until the end of the season. Having featured just twice, manager Barton labelled Macdonald as 'unfortunate' as Lewis Gordon had been on the best form of his career. He was released at the end of the season.

Following his release from Bristol Rovers, he joined Mansfield Town on a two-year deal with the option for a further year.

On 7 May 2025, the club announced he would be released in June once his contract expired.

In November 2025, Macdonald joined Northern Premier League Division One East club Matlock Town.

== International career ==
Macdonald has represented Scotland at under-21 level, gaining two caps in 2016.

== Career statistics ==
As of end of 2024–25 season

Appearances and goals by club, season and competition
Club	Season	League			FA Cup		League Cup		Other		Total	
Club	Season	Division	Apps	Goals	Apps	Goals	Apps	Goals	Apps	Goals	Apps	Goals
Derby County	2016–17	Championship	0	0	0	0	0	0	1 (Note: Appearance in the Football League Trophy with Derby County's U23 side)	0	1	0
Barrow (loan)	2017–18	National League	21	1	0	0	0	0	0	0	21	1
Blackpool	2019–20	League One	12	0	3	0	0	0	4 (Note: Appearances in the Football League Trophy)	0	19	0
Tranmere Rovers (loan)	2020–21	League Two	19	0	1	0	1	0	3	0	24	0
Tranmere Rovers	2020–21	League Two	20	0	0	0	0	0	4 (Note: Three appearances in EFL Trophy and one in EFL League Two play-offs)	0	24	0
Tranmere Rovers	2021–22	League Two	34	1	2	0	0	0	4	0	40	1
Tranmere Rovers	Tranmere Rovers total		73	1	3	0	1	0	11	0	88	1
Stockport County	2022–23	League Two	10	0	2	0	0	0	1	0	13	0
Bristol Rovers	2022–23	League One	4	0	0	0	0	0	0	0	4	0
Mansfield Town	2023–24	League Two	20	0	1	0	3	0	3	0	27	0
Mansfield Town	2024–25	League One	6	1	0	0	1	0	2	0	9	1
Mansfield Town	Total		26	1	1	0	4	0	5	0	36	1
Career total			146	3	9	0	5	0	22	0	182	3

== Honours ==
Tranmere Rovers

- EFL Trophy runner-up: 2020–21

Mansfield Town

- EFL League Two third-place promotion: 2023–24
