= Will Swan (footballer) =

English footballer (born 2000)

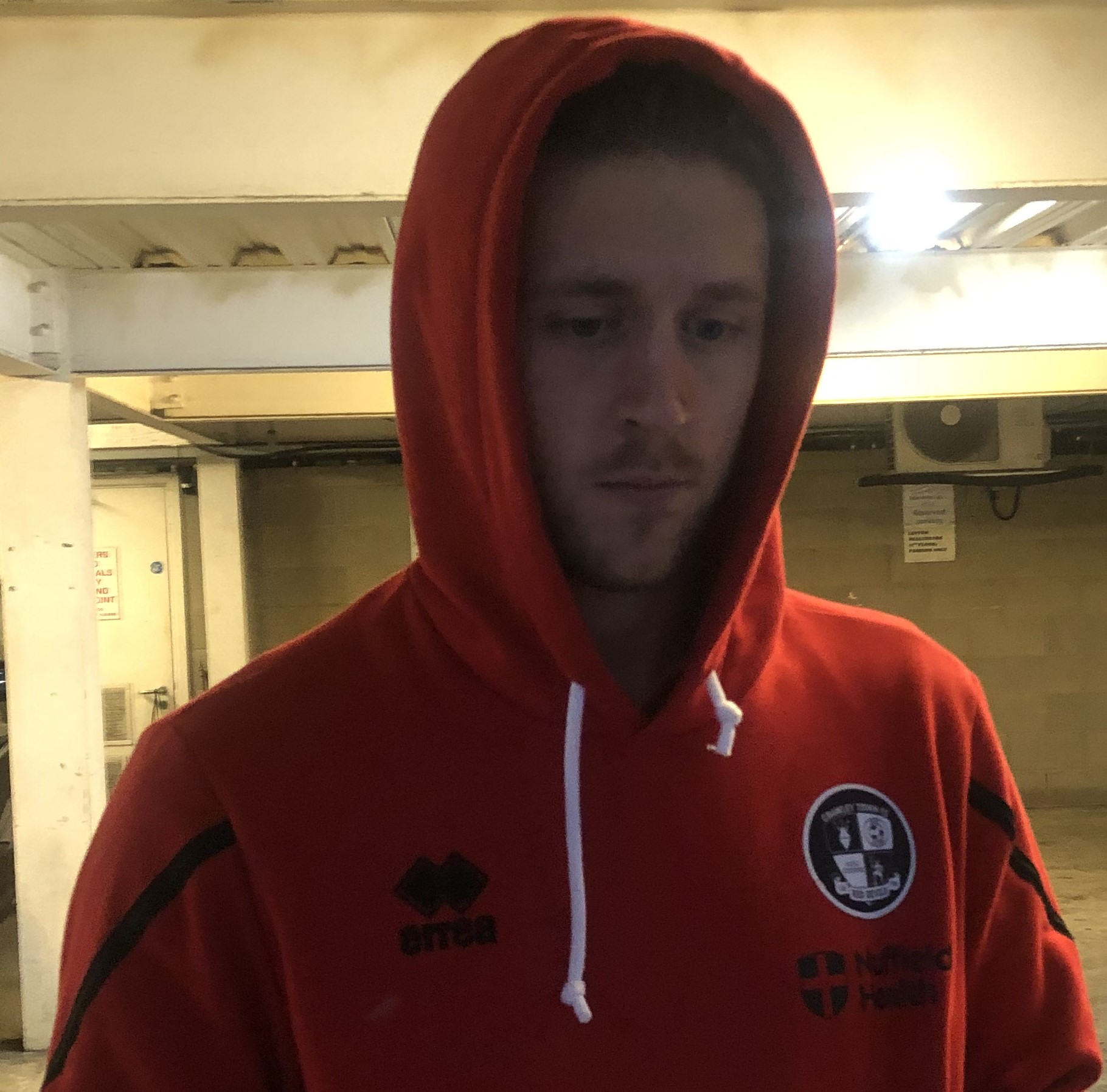
- Swan in 2024

Personal information
- Full name: William Jonathan Swan
- Date of birth: 26 October 2000 (age 26)
- Place of birth: Mansfield, England
- Height: 5 ft 8 1/2 in (1.74 m)
- Position: Forward

Team information
- Current team: Bradford City
- Number: 24

Youth career
- 2014–2020: Nottingham Forest

Senior career*
Years	Team	Apps	(Gls)
2020–2023	Nottingham Forest	2	(0)
2020	→ Truro City (loan)	9	(9)
2021	→ Port Vale (loan)	10	(1)
2022–2023	→ Mansfield Town (loan)	28	(10)
2023–2024	Mansfield Town	36	(9)
2024–2025	Crawley Town	37	(7)
2025–	Bradford City	39	(7)
- * Club domestic league appearances and goals as of 7 November 2026 (UTC)

William Jonathan Swan (born 26 October 2000) is an English professional footballer who plays as a forward for EFL League One club Bradford City.

Swan began his career at Nottingham Forest, from where he was loaned out to Truro City, Port Vale and Mansfield Town. He was sold to Mansfield Town in July 2023 and was promoted out of League Two with the club at the end of the 2023–24 season. He spent the 2024–25 season with Crawley Town, before being sold to Bradford City in June 2025.

== Career ==
=== Nottingham Forest ===
Swan joined the Nottingham Forest academy at the age of 13. On 4 January 2020, Swan joined Southern League Premier Division South side Truro City on a one-month loan and scored two goals on his debut at Treyew Road in a 4–0 win over Metropolitan Police later that day. Manager Paul Wotton said that "he comes from Nottingham Forest with high regard and its a real coup for us". The loan was extended into a second month and Swan went on to score nine goals in as many games for Truro, before returning to Nottingham on 1 March 2020.

After scoring eight goals for Forest's U23 side at the start of the season, Swan began training with Forest's first-team. Manager Chris Hughton gave him his debut in professional football on 29 November 2020, putting him on as a 76th-minute substitute during a 1–0 loss to Swansea City at the City Ground. The following month Swan signed a new contract to keep him at the club until 2024. However, his first-team opportunities were limited by the signing of Glenn Murray and return to fitness of Lewis Grabban.

On 1 February 2020, Swan moved on loan to EFL League Two side Port Vale until the end of the 2020–21 season. He scored his first goal in the English Football League on 6 March, during a 3–2 defeat at Cheltenham Town. He played ten matches during his time at Vale Park. He did not play any competitive football during the 2021–22 campaign, though did train with the Forest first-team in March 2022. He finished as top-scorer for the under-23 team, scoring 12 goals in 22 appearances as Andy Reid's side reached the semi-finals of the Premier League 2 Division 2 play-offs.

=== Mansfield Town ===
On 9 July 2022, Swan joined League Two side Mansfield Town – his hometown club – on loan for the 2022–23 season; manager Nigel Clough stated that "he'll bring youth and energy to the team". In March it was reported that he missed the rest of the season with an ankle injury and was described by Clough as a "big, big miss". He did, however, recover earlier than expected from his injury and ended the campaign with ten goals from 34 games, finishing as Mansfield's top-scorer.

On 17 May 2023, Mansfield Town agreed to an undisclosed transfer fee with Nottingham Forest to sign Swan permanently on 1 July; he signed a three-year contract. He endured a difficult start to his time as a permanent signing as he struggled with injuries and took until 28 November to score for the first time in the league. On 13 February, he scored a brace and provided an assist in a 9–2 win over Harrogate Town. Clough said that Swan was like a new signing as the player went on to win that month's Player of the Month award. Swan scored ten goals in 42 games in the 2023–24 season as Mansfield secured the third automatic promotion place.

=== Crawley Town ===
On 30 August 2024, Swan signed for fellow League One club Crawley Town on a two-year contract for an undisclosed fee. Scott Lindsey, the manager who had signed him, left the club the following month as the team began to struggle. Manager Rob Elliot praised him for his work rate in March 2025. He scored seven goals in 40 games for the "Reds" as the 2024–25 season ended in relegation.

=== Bradford City ===
On 28 June 2025, Swan joined newly-promoted League One club Bradford City on a two-year contract (with an option for a further 12 months) for an undisclosed fee. The fee was reported to be a nominal five-figure with add-ons. Manager Graham Alexander remarked that "he can play anywhere along the front line, bringing others into play while giving us another goalscoring threat". He scored his first goal for the Bantams in a 2–1 victory away at Blackburn Rovers in the EFL Cup on 12 August. His first league goal for the club came a week later as an equaliser in an eventual 2–1 away win against Stockport County. He went on to score in each of his next four league games. He ended the 2025–26 season with eight goals in 35 games.

== Style of play ==
Swan is a forward known for his intelligent movement, strong first touch, keen awareness, and clinical finishing ability.

== Career statistics ==
As of match played 14 May 2026

Appearances and goals by club, season and competition
Club	Season	League			FA Cup		EFL Cup		Other		Total	
Club	Season	Division	Apps	Goals	Apps	Goals	Apps	Goals	Apps	Goals	Apps	Goals
Nottingham Forest	2019–20	Championship	0	0	0	0	0	0	—		0	0
Nottingham Forest	2020–21	Championship	2	0	0	0	0	0	—		2	0
Nottingham Forest	2021–22	Championship	0	0	0	0	0	0	—		0	0
Nottingham Forest	2022–23	Premier League	0	0	0	0	0	0	—		0	0
Nottingham Forest	Total		2	0	0	0	0	0	0	0	2	0
Truro City (loan)	2019–20	Southern League; Premier Division South	9	9	0	0	—		0	0	9	9
Port Vale (loan)	2020–21	League Two	10	1	0	0	0	0	0	0	10	1
Mansfield Town (loan)	2022–23	League Two	28	10	1	0	1	0	4 (Note: Appearance in the EFL Trophy)	0	34	10
Mansfield Town	2023–24	League Two	35	9	1	0	3	1	3	0	42	10
Mansfield Town	2024–25	League One	1	0	—		1	0	0	0	2	0
Mansfield Town	Total		64	19	2	0	5	1	7	0	78	20
Crawley Town	2024–25	League One	37	7	1	0	0	0	2	0	40	7
Bradford City	2025–26	League One	29	6	1	0	2	2	4 (Note: 3 appearances in the EFL Trophy and 1 appearance in the play-offs)	0	36	8
Bradford City	2026–27	League One	0	0	0	0	0	0	0	0	0	0
Bradford City	Total		29	6	1	0	2	2	4	0	36	8
Career total			151	42	4	0	7	3	13	0	175	45

== Honours ==
Mansfield Town

- EFL League Two third-place promotion: 2023–24
