= Alfie Kilgour =

English footballer (born 1998)

Personal information
- Full name: Alfie George Alexander Kilgour
- Date of birth: 18 May 1998 (age 28)
- Place of birth: Bath, England
- Height: 6 ft 3 in (1.90 m)
- Position: Central defender

Team information
- Current team: Bristol Rovers
- Number: 5

Youth career
- 2006–2016: Bristol Rovers

Senior career*
Years	Team	Apps	(Gls)
2016–2023	Bristol Rovers	91	(4)
2016	→ Mangotsfield United (loan)	10	(1)
2016	→ Cirencester Town (loan)	7	(0)
2018	→ Hungerford Town (loan)	9	(1)
2018–2019	→ Maidenhead United (loan)	17	(3)
2023–2025	Mansfield Town	41	(4)
2025–	Bristol Rovers	36	(1)
- * Club domestic league appearances and goals as of 18:12, 2 May 2026 (UTC)

Alfie George Alexander Kilgour (born 18 May 1998) is an English footballer who plays as a defender for EFL League Two club Bristol Rovers.

== Career ==
=== Bristol Rovers ===
Kilgour began his career in the academy at Bristol Rovers aged eight, and first featured in the matchday squad for the first team while still an under-18, twice appearing as an unused substitute for EFL League Two games in the 2015–16 season. In February 2016, Kilgour was loaned to Mangotsfield United. After promotion that season, with first team opportunities hard to come by, he was loaned out again, this time to Cirencester Town in September 2016. In December 2016, during a Gloucestershire Senior Cup tie, Kilgour suffered a torn anterior cruciate ligament and a detached hamstring, leaving him needing surgery. In March 2018, he joined Hungerford Town on loan.

In November 2018, Kilgour joined Maidenhead United on loan and made his debut in their televised FA Cup game at home to Portsmouth. In January 2019, his loan was extended until the end of the season. After 19 games and three goals in all competitions, Kilgour was recalled by Rovers in March to boost their defensive options. He made his debut on 12 March when he came on as a late substitute in a 1–0 away win at Gillingham. His first start came eleven days later, playing the entirety of a 2–2 draw away at Plymouth Argyle. At the end of the 2018–19 season, Kilgour was given the award of Bristol Rovers Development Squad Player of the Season. At the end of the 2018–19 season, Bristol Rovers exercised a contract extension for him. He signed a new contract in August 2019.

He scored his first goal for the club in an EFL Trophy tie against Leyton Orient on 4 December 2019. On 15 February 2020, Kilgour scored his second league goal for the club with a thirty yard screamer to equalise in a 2–1 victory over Blackpool, a goal that would win League One goal of the month for February 2020.

On 4 July 2020, Kilgour signed another new contract with Rovers that would see him stay at the club until the end of the 2022-23 season after having a breakthrough season that saw him make 45 appearances in all competitions before the season was cut short.

On 2 October 2021, Kilgour received the first red card of his career as he was dismissed for a handball in the penalty area that the referee deemed worthy of a second yellow card. Swindon Town dispatched the penalty with just five minutes remaining to go into a 2–1 lead that they eventually added another goal to. Kilgour made his 100th appearance for the club on 16 October 2021, marking it with his first goal of the 2021–22 season to make it 1–1 in an eventual 2–2 draw at Bradford City. In November, Kilgour suffered a knee injury in a 2–2 draw with Tranmere Rovers, having to undergo surgery. Kilgour returned to action in January 2022, playing the entirety of a 2–0 victory over Hartlepool United however suffered an adverse reaction in the days following. In March 2022, manager Joey Barton confirmed that Kilgour had undergone a second knee surgery for the season after they had identified the root cause of the issue and that the defender was likely to miss the rest of the season.

=== Mansfield Town ===
On 12 January 2023, Kilgour signed for League Two club Mansfield Town for an undisclosed fee on an eighteen-month contract, bringing his seventeen year association with Bristol Rovers to an end. Alfie scored on his full debut for Mansfield with a half volley from 16 yards which saw the Stags beat Doncaster Rovers 4-1 at Field Mill. His impressive start to life at Mansfield continued across the second half of the season, winning the club's player of the month award for three successive months between February and April 2023.

On 15 August 2023, Kilgour was stretchered off just seventeen minutes into a 2–2 draw with Doncaster Rovers, revealed to be a ruptured achilles that would rule him out for the remainder of the season. In January 2024, he signed a new eighteen-month contract extension to keep him at the club until June 2025. On 5 October 2024, he made his return to playing, 418 days after suffering his injury. Having struggled for regular first-team playing time following his return, manager Nigel Clough admitted that a loan move would have been ideal following the closing of the January transfer window.

Kilgour was released upon the expiration of his contract at the end of the 2024–25 season.

=== Return to Bristol Rovers ===
On 25 June 2025, Kilgour agreed to return to Bristol Rovers on a two-year deal. On 2 August, the start date of the 2025–26 season, he was named club captain. Following a strong individual start to the season, he was named as the club's Player of the Month for August. On 20 September, he made his 100th league appearance for the club in a 1–1 draw with Colchester United. On 21 March 2026, he scored his first goal since his return to the club, the equaliser in an eventual 2–1 victory away to Gillingham. Although the season ended early for Kilgour due to undergoing surgery for a hernia problem, he was voted Player of the Year.

== Career statistics ==
As of match played end of 2025–26 season

Club	Season	League			FA Cup		League Cup		Other		Total	
Club	Season	Division	Apps	Goals	Apps	Goals	Apps	Goals	Apps	Goals	Apps	Goals
Bristol Rovers	2015–16	League Two	0	0	0	0	0	0	0	0	0	0
Bristol Rovers	2016–17	League One	0	0	0	0	0	0	0	0	0	0
Bristol Rovers	2017–18	League One	0	0	0	0	0	0	0	0	0	0
Bristol Rovers	2018–19	League One	4	0	0	0	0	0	0	0	4	0
Bristol Rovers	2019–20	League One	33	2	6	0	2	0	4 (Note: Appearances in EFL Trophy)	1	45	3
Bristol Rovers	2020–21	League One	35	1	3	1	1	0	5	0	44	2
Bristol Rovers	2021–22	League Two	11	1	1	0	1	0	1	0	14	1
Bristol Rovers	2022–23	League One	8	0	0	0	1	0	3	1	12	1
Bristol Rovers	Total		91	4	10	1	5	0	13	2	119	7
Mangotsfield United (loan)	2015–16	Southern D1 South & West	10	1	0	0	—		0	0	10	1
Cirencester Town (loan)	2016–17	Southern Premier	7	0	1	0	—		1 (Note: Appearances in FA Trophy)	1	9	1
Hungerford Town (loan)	2017–18	National League South	9	1	0	0	—		0	0	9	1
Maidenhead United (loan)	2018–19	National League	17	3	1	0	—		1	0	19	3
Mansfield Town	2022–23	League Two	21	4	0	0	0	0	0	0	21	4
Mansfield Town	2023–24	League Two	3	0	0	0	1	0	0	0	4	0
Mansfield Town	2024–25	League One	17	0	3	0	0	0	1	0	21	0
Mansfield Town	Total		41	4	3	0	1	0	1	0	46	4
Bristol Rovers	2025–26	League Two	36	1	0	0	1	0	1	0	38	1
Career total			212	14	15	1	7	0	16	3	249	18

== Honours ==
Bristol Rovers

- EFL League Two third-place promotion: 2021–22

Mansfield Town

- EFL League Two third-place promotion: 2023–24

Individual

- Bristol Rovers Supporters' Club Player of the Year: 2025–26
- Bristol Rovers Development Squad Player of the Season: 2018–19
- EFL League One Goal of the Month: February 2020
