= 2024–25 Mansfield Town F.C. season =

128th season in existence of Mansfield Town FC

Mansfield Town
2024–25 season
- Owner: John Radford
- Chief Executive: Carolyn Radford
- Manager: Nigel Clough
- Stadium: Field Mill
- League One: 17th
- FA Cup: Third round
- EFL Cup: First round
- EFL Trophy: Group stage
- Top goalscorer: League: Will Evans (14 goals); All: Will Evans (14 goals)
- Highest home attendance: 8,583 v Birmingham City (26 October 2024)
- Lowest home attendance: 1,311 v Newcastle United U21 (29 October 2024,EFL Trophy)
- Average home league attendance: 7,769
- Biggest win: 0-4 v Curzon Ashton (A) (3 November 2024 FA Cup)
- Biggest defeat: 4-1 v Lincoln City (A) (24 August 2024 EFL League One)
Home colours	Away colours

The 2024–25 season was the 128th season in the history of Mansfield Town Football Club and their first season back in League One, the third-tier of English football, since the 2002–03 season following their promotion from League Two in the previous season. In addition to the domestic league, the club would also participate in the FA Cup, the EFL Cup, and the EFL Trophy.

== Players ==
=== Current squad ===
As of 30 August 2024

Note: Flags indicate national team as defined under FIFA eligibility rules; some limited exceptions apply. Players may hold more than one non-FIFA nationality.

No.	Pos.	Nation	Player
1	GK	NIR	Christy Pym
2	DF	ENG	George Williams
3	DF	IRL	Stephen McLaughlin
4	DF	WAL	Elliott Hewitt
5	DF	ENG	Alfie Kilgour
6	DF	ENG	Baily Cargill
7	FW	GRN	Lucas Akins
8	MF	WAL	Aaron Lewis
9	DF	ENG	Jordan Bowery
10	MF	ENG	George Maris
11	FW	WAL	Will Evans
12	DF	SCO	Calum Macdonald
13	GK	ENG	Scott Flinders
14	DF	ENG	Aden Flint (captain)

No.	Pos.	Nation	Player
15	FW	IRL	Ben Quinn
16	MF	IRL	Stephen Quinn
17	MF	AUS	Keanu Baccus
18	FW	ENG	Rhys Oates
19	FW	ENG	Lee Gregory
20	FW	ENG	Tom Nichols
21	FW	NZL	Ben Waine (on loan from Plymouth Argyle)
22	DF	ENG	Frazer Blake-Tracy
23	DF	ENG	Deji Oshilaja
24	MF	SCO	Matthew Craig (on loan from Tottenham Hotspur)
25	MF	ENG	Louis Reed
44	MF	ENG	Hiram Boateng
—	DF	ENG	George Cooper

== Transfers ==
=== In ===
Date	Pos.	Player	From	Fee	Ref
1 July 2024 (Note: The transfer was announced on 22 May, and would become official on July 1 once his St Mirren contract expired)	DM	Keanu Baccus (AUS)	St Mirren (SCO)	Free	
1 July 2024 (Note: The transfer was announced on 3 June, and would become official on July 1 once his Swindon Town contract expired)	CB	Frazer Blake-Tracy (ENG)	Swindon Town (ENG)	Free	
1 July 2024 (Note: The transfer was announced on 15 May, and would become official on July 1 once his Sheffield Wednesday contract expired)	CF	Lee Gregory (ENG)	Sheffield Wednesday (ENG)	Free	
1 July 2024 (Note: The transfer was announced on 17 June, and would become official on July 1 once his Burton Albion contract expired)	CM	Deji Oshilaja (ENG)	Burton Albion (ENG)	Free	
2 August 2024	RW	Ben Quinn (IRL)	Celtic (SCO)	Free	
6 August 2024	CF	Will Evans (WAL)	Newport County (WAL)	Undisclosed	

=== Out ===
Date	Pos.	Player	To	Fee	Ref.
14 June 2024 (Note: The transfer was announced on 31 May, and would become official on June 14 once the transfer window re-opened)	CM	Ollie Clarke (ENG)	Swindon Town (ENG)	Undisclosed	
30 August 2024	AM	Davis Keillor-Dunn (ENG)	Barnsley (ENG)	Undisclosed	
30 August 2024	CF	Will Swan (ENG)	Crawley Town (ENG)	Undisclosed	

=== Loaned in ===
Date	Pos.	Player	From	Date until	Ref.
30 August 2024	CF	Ben Waine (NZL)	Plymouth Argyle (ENG)	End of Season	
9 January 2025	DM	Matthew Craig (SCO)	Tottenham Hotspur (ENG)	End of Season	
3 February 2025	CF	Jordan Rhodes (SCO)	Blackpool (ENG)	End of Season	
3 February 2025	AM	Caylan Vickers (ENG)	Brighton & Hove Albion (ENG)	End of Season	

=== Loaned out ===
Date	Pos.	Player	To	Date until	Ref.
10 January 2025	CF	Tom Nichols (ENG)	Swindon Town (ENG)	End of Season	
17 January 2025	CF	James Gale (ENG)	Boston United (ENG)	End of Season	

=== Released / Out of Contract ===
Date	Pos.	Player	Subsequent club	Join date	Ref.
30 June 2024	CM	Anthony Hartigan (ENG)	Barnet (ENG)	1 July 2024	
30 June 2024	RB	Callum Johnson (ENG)	Bradford City (ENG)	1 July 2024	
30 June 2024	CB	John-Joe O'Toole (IRL)	AFC Wimbledon (ENG)	1 July 2024	
30 June 2024	GK	Louie Turner (ENG)			

== Pre-season and friendlies ==
On 21 June, Mansfield Town announced a pre-season training camp in Albufeira, Portugal with a friendly fixture against Chelsea U21. Four days later, the club confirmed their pre-season schedule with fixtures against Retford United, Hucknall Town, Oxford United, Alfreton Town, Grimsby Town and Matlock Town.

Win Draw Loss Fixtures

16 July 2024 Friendly	Retford United	0–7	Mansfield Town	Retford
19:30 BST		Report	Oshilaja; McWoods; Swan; S. Quinn; B. Quinn; Reed; Boateng	Stadium: Cannon Park

20 July 2024 Friendly	Hucknall Town	0–6	Mansfield Town	Hucknall
15:00 BST		Report	Boateng; B. Quinn pen; McWoods; Baccus; Flanagan; McLaughlin	Stadium: Ariel Way

23 July 2024 Friendly	Mansfield Town	2–1	Chelsea U21	Albufeira, Portugal
18:30 WEST (18:30 BST)	Quinn 20'; McLaughlin 44'	Report	Castledine 45+2'	Stadium: Estádio Municipal de Albufeira

27 July 2024 Friendly	Mansfield Town	1–0	Oxford United	Mansfield
15:00 BST	Keillor-Dunn 59'	Report		Stadium: Field Mill; Attendance: 2,455; Referee: Matthew Donohue

30 July 2024 Friendly	Alfreton Town	1–1	Mansfield Town	Alfreton
19:30 BST	Lund 37'	Report	Oshilaja 39'	Stadium: North Street; Attendance: 888

3 August 2024 Friendly	Grimsby Town	0–1	Mansfield Town	Cleethorpes
15:00 BST		Report	Keillor-Dunn 79'	Stadium: Blundell Park; Attendance: 1,733

6 August 2024 Friendly	Matlock Town	0–3	Mansfield Town	Matlock
19:45 BST		Report	Evans 27'; Macdonald 39'; Swan 72'	Stadium: Causeway Lane; Attendance: 1,320

== Competitions ==
=== League One ===
==== League table ====
Pos	Team	Pld	W	D	L	GF	GA	GD	Pts
15	Wigan Athletic	46	13	17	16	40	42	−2	56
16	Exeter City	46	15	11	20	49	65	−16	56
17	Mansfield Town	46	15	9	22	60	73	−13	54
18	Peterborough United	46	13	12	21	68	81	−13	51
19	Northampton Town	46	12	15	19	48	66	−18	51

Source: EFL Official Website
Rules for classification: 1) Points; 2) Goal difference; 3) Number of goals scored; 4) Head-to-head results; 5) Wins; 6) Away goals; 7) Penalty points (sec 9.5); 8) 12-point sending off offences

==== Results summary ====
Overall								Home						Away					
Pld	W	D	L	GF	GA	GD	Pts	W	D	L	GF	GA	GD	W	D	L	GF	GA	GD
45	14	9	22	57	73	−16	51	7	4	11	27	34	−7	7	5	11	30	39	−9

Last updated: 30 April 2025.
Source: Soccerway

==== Matches ====
On 26 June, the League One fixtures were announced.

Win Draw Loss Fixtures

9 August 2024 1	Barnsley	1–2	Mansfield Town	Barnsley
20:00 BST	Connell 32'; Earl (yellow card) 79'	Report	Quinn 13', (yellow card) 25'; Gregory 18'; Pym (yellow card) 66'; Nichols (yellow card) 90+1'	Stadium: Oakwell; Attendance: 14,817; Referee: Ben Toner

17 August 2024 2	Mansfield Town	3–3	Burton Albion	Mansfield
15:00 BST	Evans 4'; Armer 45+1' (o.g.); Reed (yellow card) 72'; Gregory 90+7' (pen.)	Report	Bodin 7', 81'; Armer (yellow card) 9'; Whitfield 69'; Vancooten (yellow card) 78'; Bajrami (yellow card) 90+6'	Stadium: Field Mill; Attendance: 7,781; Referee: Sam Purkiss

24 August 2024 3	Lincoln City	4–1	Mansfield Town	Lincoln
15:00 BST	Jackson 29', 47'; McGrandles (yellow card) 31'; House (yellow card) 43', (goal) 51'; Roughan 45+2'; O'Connor (yellow card) 75'	Report	Quinn (yellow card) 18'; Oshilaja (yellow card) 23', (goal) 69'; Hewitt (yellow card) 63'	Stadium: Sincil Bank; Attendance: 9,809; Referee: Seb Stockbridge

31 August 2024 4	Mansfield Town	1–1	Stockport County	Mansfield
15:00 BST	Boateng 22'	Report	Camps (yellow card) 11'; Wootton 37'	Stadium: Field Mill; Attendance: 8,293; Referee: Scott Oldham

14 September 2024 6	Mansfield Town	2–1	Cambridge United	Mansfield
12:30 BST	Gregory 39', 68', (yellow card) 44'	Report	Smith (yellow card) 45'; Longelo 50'; Rossi (yellow card) 70'; Digby (yellow card) 89'	Stadium: Field Mill; Attendance: 7,294; Referee: Martin Coy
Note: Fixture was initially scheduled for a 15:00, but was moved for live Sky Sports broadcast.

21 September 2024 7	Mansfield Town	2–1	Shrewsbury Town	Mansfield
15:00 BST	Gregory 49' (pen.); Boateng (yellow card) 53'; Lewis 86'	Report	Castledine 2', (yellow card) 40'; Savin (yellow card) 37'; Lloyd (yellow card) 42'; Benning (yellow card) 70'	Stadium: Field Mill; Attendance: 7,313; Referee: Lewis Smith

28 September 2024 8	Northampton Town	0–2	Mansfield Town	Sixfields
15:00 BST	Fosu (penalty missed) 38'	Report	Evans 47', (yellow card) 51'; Cargill (yellow card) 58'; Boateng (yellow card) 67'; Lewis 89'	Stadium: Sixfields Stadium; Attendance: 7,024; Referee: Ben Speedie

1 October 2024 9	Crawley Town	0–2	Mansfield Town	Crawley
19:45 BST	Adeyemo (yellow card) 22'; Ibrahim (yellow card) 36'; Williams (yellow card) 36'; Darcy (yellow card) 69'; Mullarkey (yellow card) 76'; Roles (yellow card) 89'	Report	Gregory 12'; Evans (yellow card) 13'; Baccus (yellow card) 29'; Lewis (yellow card) 44'; Waine 90+2'	Stadium: Broadfield Stadium; Referee: Charles Breakspear

5 October 2024 10	Mansfield Town	2–0	Blackpool	Mansfield
15:00 BST	Evans 8', 39'; Reed (yellow card) 17'; McLaughlin (yellow card) 29'; Oshilaja (yellow card) 45+1'; Lewis (yellow card) 81'	Report	Joseph (yellow card) 67'	Stadium: Field Mill; Attendance: 8,121; Referee: Lee Swabey

19 October 2024 12	Mansfield Town	0–1	Stevenage	Mansfield
15:00 BST	Cargill (yellow card) 24'; Reed (yellow card) 64'	Report	Young 32'; James-Wildin (yellow card) 66'	Stadium: Field Mill; Attendance: 7,135; Referee: James Durkin

22 October 2024 13	Wigan Athletic	1–2	Mansfield Town	Wigan
19:45 BST	Aasgaard 53'	Report	Evans 29'; Baccus 62'; Akins (yellow card) 36'; Baccus (yellow card) 82'; Cargill (yellow card) 90+2'	Stadium: Brick Community Stadium

26 October 2024 14	Mansfield Town	1–1	Birmingham City	Mansfield
12:30 BST	Lewis (yellow card) 41'; McLaughlin (yellow card) 56'; Gregory 63'	Report	Willumsson 10'; Iwata (yellow card) 22'	Stadium: Field Mill; Attendance: 8,583; Referee: Paul Howard
Note: Fixture was initially scheduled for a 15:00, but was moved for live Sky Sports broadcast.

9 November 2024 15	Wrexham	1–0	Mansfield Town	Wrexham
12:30 GMT	Barnett 6'; Palmer (yellow card) 45+2'; Scarr (yellow card) 90'	Report	Baccus (yellow card) 45'; Cargill (yellow card) 90+1'	Stadium: Racecourse Ground; Attendance: 13,278; Referee: Simon Mather
Note: Fixture was initially scheduled for a 15:00, but was moved for live Sky Sports broadcast.

23 November 2024 17	Mansfield Town	0–1	Bristol Rovers	Mansfield
15:00 GMT	Reed (yellow card) 25'; Blake-Tracy (yellow card) 56'; Hewitt (yellow card) 90+3'	Report	Conteh (yellow card) 26'; McCormick 49', (yellow card) 57'	Stadium: Field Mill; Attendance: 7,357; Referee: Carl Brook

26 November 2024 5	Wycombe Wanderers	1–0	Mansfield Town	High Wycombe
19:45 GMT	Low (yellow card) 71'; Leahy 90+3'	Report	Cargill (yellow card) 45+1'	Stadium: Adams Park; Attendance: 4,670; Referee: Craig Hicks
Note: Fixture was originally scheduled for 7 September, but was postponed due to international call-ups.

3 December 2024 18	Bolton Wanderers	3–1	Mansfield Town	Horwich
19:45 GMT	Collins (yellow card) 51'; Charles 75'; Adeboyejo 80'; McAtee 85'	Report	Boateng 34', (yellow card) 59' (yellow-red card) 70'; Bowery (yellow card) 46'; Evans (yellow card) 59'; Oshilaja (yellow card) 90+1'	Stadium: Toughsheet Community Stadium; Attendance: 19,823; Referee: Seb Stockbridge

7 December 2024 19	Mansfield Town	1–2	Huddersfield Town	Mansfield
15:00 GMT	Oshilaja 31'; Flint (yellow card) 54'	Report	Wiles 8'; Koroma 33'; Helik (yellow card) 45+2'; Chapman (yellow card) 45+3'; Radulović (yellow card) 90+4'	Stadium: Field Mill; Attendance: 8,568; Referee: Adam Herczeg

14 December 2024 20	Charlton Athletic	0–0	Mansfield Town	Charlton
15:00 GMT	Mitchell (yellow card) 73'; Coventry (yellow card) 89'	Report	Reed (yellow card) 51'; Oshilaja (yellow card) 83'; Cargill (yellow card) 90+3'	Stadium: The Valley; Attendance: 14,132; Referee: Ben Speedie

21 December 2024 21	Mansfield Town	1–0	Rotherham United	Mansfield
15:00 GMT	Oshilaja 27'; Lewis (yellow card) 59'	Report		Stadium: Field Mill; Attendance: 8,401; Referee: Zac Kennard-Kettle

26 December 2024 22	Peterborough United	0–3	Mansfield Town	Peterborough
15:00 GMT	Wallin (yellow card) 79'; Katongo (yellow card) 81'; Nevett (red card) 86'	Report	Cargill 6'; Evans 9', 31'; Blake-Tracy (yellow card) 53'; McLaughlin (yellow card) 55'; Hewitt (yellow card) 64'; Lewis (yellow card) 66'	Stadium: London Road Stadium; Referee: Jacob Miles

29 December 2024 23	Reading	2–1	Mansfield Town	Reading
15:00 GMT	Camará 17'; Bindon 55'; Mbengue (yellow card) 78'; Wareham (yellow card) 90+2'	Report	Evans 45', (yellow card) 54'; McLaughlin (yellow card) 83'	Stadium: Madejski Stadium; Attendance: 13,626; Referee: Martin Woods

1 January 2025 24	Mansfield Town	2–1	Bolton Wanderers	Mansfield
15:00 GMT	McLaughlin 20', (yellow card) 78'; Gregory 36', (yellow card) 54'; Cargill (yellow card) 59'; Lewis (yellow card) 89'	Report	Dacres-Cogley (yellow card) 14'; Collins 40'; Schön (yellow card) 54'; Santos (yellow card) 72'; Williams (yellow card) 74'; Osei-Tutu (yellow card) 89'	Stadium: Field Mill; Attendance: 8,553; Referee: Anthony Backhouse

4 January 2025 25	Stockport County	1–2	Mansfield Town	Edgeley
15:00 GMT	Collar 20'	Report	Gregory 12', (penalty missed) 26', (yellow card) 74'; Evans 39'; Oshilaja (yellow card) 44'	Stadium: Edgeley Park; Attendance: 10,012; Referee: James Durkin

18 January 2025 27	Mansfield Town	1–2	Wycombe Wanderers	Mansfield
15:00 GMT	Cargill (yellow card) 31'; Akins 68'	Report	Kone 57'; Onyedinma (yellow card) 62'; McCleary 87'	Stadium: Field Mill; Attendance: 7,459; Referee: Sam Purkiss

25 January 2025 28	Cambridge United	3–2	Mansfield Town	Cambridge
12:30 GMT	Morrison 1'; Stokes 7' (pen.); Loft 47'; Digby (yellow card) 72'; Stevens (yellow card) 90+1'	Report	Hewitt (yellow card) 45+2'; Maris 61'; Gregory 90+1' (pen.); Blake-Tracy (yellow card) 90+2'	Stadium: Abbey Stadium; Attendance: L Referee: Thomas Parsons
Note: Fixture was initially scheduled to kick-off at 15:00, but was moved for live Sky Sports broadcasting.

28 January 2025 29	Mansfield Town	0–1	Crawley Town	Mansfield
19:45 GMT	Cargill (yellow card) 77'	Report	Barker (yellow card) 50'; Adeyemo 81'; Radcliffe (yellow card) 90+5'	Stadium: Field Mill; Attendance: 6,836; Referee: Scott Oldham

1 February 2025 30	Shrewsbury Town	2–1	Mansfield Town	Shrewsbury
15:00 GMT	Nsiala (red card) 34'; Pierre (yellow card) 37'; Marquis 54'; Lloyd 63'	Report	Evans 5'; Cargill (yellow card) 59'	Stadium: New Meadow; Attendance: 7,736; Referee: David Rock

7 February 2025 31	Mansfield Town	0–1	Northampton Town	Mansfield
19:45 GMT	Lewis (yellow card) 28'; Rhodes (yellow card) 49'; Boateng (yellow card) 85'	Report	Hoskins (penalty missed) 20'; McGeehan 55'; Shaw (yellow card) 81'; Perry (yellow card) 90+2'	Stadium: Field Mill; Attendance: 7,320; Referee: Edward Duckworth
Note: Fixture was initially scheduled for 8 February, but was moved for live Sky Sports broadcasting.

11 February 2025 16	Leyton Orient	3–0	Mansfield Town	Leyton
19:45 GMT	Brown 6', (yellow card) 61'; Williams 17'; Galbraith 32'; Pratley (yellow card) 89'	Report	Kilgour (yellow card) 37'; Vickers (yellow card) 56'; Akins (yellow card) 73'; Boateng (yellow card) 88'; Macdonald (yellow card) 89'; Maris (yellow card) 90+2'	Stadium: Brisbane Road; Attendance: 6,527; Referee: Sunny Singh Gill
Note: Fixture was originally scheduled for 16 November, but was postponed due to international call-ups.

15 February 2025 32	Blackpool	3–3	Mansfield Town	Blackpool
15:00 GMT	Carey 19'; Fletcher 71'; Ennis 77'	Report	Evans 24'; Baccus 29'; Akins 64'	Stadium: Bloomfield Road; Referee: Elliot Bell

18 February 2025 26	Mansfield Town	0–3	Lincoln City	Mansfield
19:45 GMT	Baccus (yellow card) 45'; Maris (yellow card) 90'	Report	O'Connor 9'; Makama (yellow card) 66'; Clucas 83', (yellow card) 83'; Jefferies 89'; Jeacock (yellow card) 90+5'	Stadium: Field Mill; Attendance: 8,326; Referee: Aaron Bannister
Note: Fixture was initially scheduled for 11 January, but was postponed due to FA Cup involvements.

23 February 2025 33	Mansfield Town	1–2	Wrexham	Mansfield
15:00 GMT	MacDonald 16'	Report	MacDonald 2' (o.g.); Cleworth 58'	Stadium: Field Mill; Attendance: 8,122; Referee: Matthew Corlett
Note: Fixture was initially scheduled for 22 February, but was moved for live Sky Sports broadcasting.

1 March 2025 34	Burton Albion	1–1	Mansfield Town	Burton upon Trent
15:00 GMT	Dodgson 13'; McKiernan (yellow card) 81'; Jones (yellow card) 89'	Report	Hewitt (yellow card) 43'; Sweeney 52' (o.g.); McLaughlin (yellow card) 55'; Akins (penalty missed) 89'	Stadium: Pirelli Stadium; Attendance: 5,007; Referee: Matthew Russell

4 March 2025 35	Mansfield Town	0–0	Wigan Athletic	Wigan
19:45 GMT		Report	Smith (yellow card) 75'; Darcy (yellow card) 84'	Stadium: Brick Community Stadium; Attendance: 6,884; Referee: Will Finnie

8 March 2025 36	Stevenage	1–1	Mansfield Town	Stevenage
15:00 GMT	Reid 44'; Roberts (yellow card) 65'	Report	Vickers (yellow card) 61'; Cargill (yellow card) 71'; Rhodes 81'; Lewis (yellow card) 88'	Stadium: Broadhall Way; Attendance: 3,675; Referee: Greg Rollason

11 March 2025 11	Exeter City	2–0	Mansfield Town	Exeter
19:45 GMT	Mitchell 8'; A. MacDonald 49'; Francis (yellow card) 57'	Report	Bowery (yellow card) 38'	Stadium: St James Park; Attendance: 5,214 (259 away); Referee: Paul Howard
Note: Fixture was originally scheduled for 12 October and 14 January, but was postponed on both occasions due to international call-ups and FA Cup involvements respectively.

15 March 2025 37	Mansfield Town	2–1	Barnsley	Mansfield
15:00 GMT	Vickers 11'; Oshilaja 90'	Report	Benson 54'	Stadium: Field Mill; Attendance: 8,592; Referee: Tom Reeves

29 March 2025 39	Bristol Rovers	1–2	Mansfield Town	Horfield
15:00 GMT	Sawyers 26'	Report	Vickers 1'; Oshilaja (yellow card) 12'; Boateng (yellow card) 21'; Reed (yellow card) 43'; Dwyer 59'; Baccus (yellow card) 89'	Stadium: Memorial Stadium; Attendance: 9,067; Referee: Scott Tallis

1 April 2025 40	Mansfield Town	1–2	Charlton Athletic	Mansfield
19:45 BST	Akins (yellow card) 34'; Craig 40'; Flint (yellow card) 84'	Report	Godden 22'; Campbell (yellow card) 57', (goal) 74'	Stadium: Field Mill; Attendance: 7,517; Referee: James Bell

5 April 2025 41	Huddersfield Town	2–1	Mansfield Town	Huddersfield
15:00 BST	Roosken 69', (yellow card) 87'; Wiles 80'	Report	Reed (yellow card) 41'; Williams (yellow card) 62'; Dwyer 82'; Baccus (yellow card) 85'	Stadium: Kirklees Stadium; Attendance: 19,986; Referee: Martin Coy

8 April 2025 38	Mansfield Town	2–3	Leyton Orient	Mansfield
19:45 BST	Dwyer 3'; Hewitt (yellow card) 25'; Cargill (yellow card) 60'; Maris 62'; Kilgour (yellow card) 78'; McLaughlin (yellow card) 80'; Boateng (yellow card) 90+6'	Report	Markanday 39'; Kelman 54', 69'; Brown (yellow card) 58'; Abdulai (yellow card) 78'	Stadium: Field Mill; Attendance: 6,980; Referee: Charles Breakspear
Note: Fixture was initially scheduled for 22 March, but was rearranged due to international call-ups within the Leyton Orient squad.

18 April 2025 43	Rotherham United	3–3	Mansfield Town	Rotherham
15:00 BST	Wilks 17', 66'; Nombe 36'; Douglas (yellow card) 90+7'	Report	Maris 8'; Cargill (yellow card) 24'; Reed (yellow card) 27'; Flint 77'; Bowery 87'; Oshilaja (yellow card) 90+5'	Stadium: New York Stadium; Attendance: 10,665; Referee: David Rock

21 April 2025 44	Mansfield Town	1–5	Reading	Mansfield
15:00 BST	Baccus 62', (yellow card) 82'	Report	Wareham 35', 74'; Williams 49' (o.g.); Wing 57'; Garcia (yellow card) 66'; Bodin 90+5'	Stadium: Field Mill; Attendance: 8,377; Referee: Ross Joyce

27 April 2025 45	Birmingham City	4–0	Mansfield Town	Bordesley
15:00 BST	Anderson 24'; Willumsson 39'; Dowell 50'; Iwata 57'; Davies (yellow card) 90+2'	Report	Waine (yellow card) 90+1'	Stadium: St Andrew's; Referee: John Busby
Note: Fixture was initially scheduled for 26 April, but was pushed back twenty-four hours.

30 April 2025 42	Mansfield Town	4–2	Peterborough United	Mansfield
19:45 BST	Maris 4'; Baccus 7'; Evans 34', 59'	Report	Nevett (yellow card) 42'; de Havilland 51'; Lindgren 87'	Stadium: Field Mill; Referee: Aaron Bannister
Note: Fixture was initially scheduled for 12 April, but was rearranged due to Peterborough's involvements in the 2025 EFL Trophy final.

3 May 2025 46	Mansfield Town	3–0	Exeter City	Mansfield
15:00 BST	McLaughlin 25'; Dwyer 38'; Waine 82'; Kokkinos (yellow card) 90+2'	Report		Stadium: Field Mill; Attendance: 7,494; Referee: William Davis

=== FA Cup ===
Mansfield Town were drawn away to Curzon Ashton in the first round, to Stevenage in the second round and at home to Wigan Athletic in the third round.

Win Draw Loss Fixtures

3 November 2024 First round	Curzon Ashton	0–4	Mansfield Town	Ashton-under-Lyne
14:00 GMT	Poscha (red card) 16'; Mahon (yellow card) 72'; Spencer (yellow card) 73'	Report	Akins 16' (pen.); Maris (yellow card) 23'; S. Quinn 30', (yellow card) 70'; Waine 73'; Oshilaja (yellow card) 80'; B. Quinn 86'	Stadium: Tameside Stadium; Attendance: 2,553; Referee: Thomas Parsons

30 November 2024 Second round	Stevenage	0–1	Mansfield Town	Stevenage
15:00 GMT	Thompson (yellow card) 45+1'; James-Wildin (yellow card) 59'	Report	Baccus (yellow card) 33'; McLaughlin 48'	Stadium: Broadhall Way; Attendance: 2,464; Referee: Tom Reeves

14 January 2025 Third round	Mansfield Town	0–2	Wigan Athletic	Mansfield
19:45 GMT	Gregory (yellow card) 45'; Akins (yellow card) 85'	Report	Aasgaard 48', 54'	Stadium: Field Mill; Attendance: 4,523; Referee: Alex Chilowicz
Note: Fixture was originally scheduled for 11 January, but was postponed and then rearranged for three days later due to a frozen pitch.

=== EFL Cup ===
On 27 June, the draw for the first round was made, with Mansfield being drawn away against Bolton Wanderers.

Win Draw Loss Fixtures

13 August 2024 First round	Bolton Wanderers	1–1 (5–4 p)	Mansfield Town	Horwich
19:45 BST	Johnston (yellow card) 39'; McAtee (yellow card) 41'; Thomason 68'	Report	Macdonald (yellow card) 28'; Oshilaja (yellow card) 67'; Boateng (yellow card) 78'; Keillor-Dunn 83', (yellow card) 90+3'	Stadium: Toughsheet Community Stadium; Attendance: 4,131; Referee: Adam Herczeg
	Penalties
	Adeboyejo (penalty scored); Thomason (penalty missed); Collins (penalty scored); Williams (penalty missed); Charles (penalty scored); Matete (penalty scored); Dacres-Cogley (penalty scored)		(penalty scored) Bowery; (penalty scored) Gregory; (penalty scored) Hewitt; (penalty missed) Boateng; (penalty missed) Lewis; (penalty scored) Macdonald; (penalty missed) Swan

=== EFL Trophy ===
In the group stage, Mansfield were drawn into Northern Group H alongside Bradford City, Rotherham United and Newcastle United U21.

Pos	Div	Team	Pld	W	PW	PL	L	GF	GA	GD	Pts	Qualification
1	L1	Rotherham United	3	3	0	0	0	6	1	+5	9	Advance to Round 2
2	L2	Bradford City	3	1	0	1	1	5	3	+2	4	Advance to Round 2
3	L1	Mansfield Town	3	1	0	0	2	3	5	−2	3	
4	ACA	Newcastle United U21	3	0	1	0	2	3	8	−5	2	

Source: EFL

Win Draw Loss Fixtures

20 August 2024 Group stage	Rotherham United	2–0	Mansfield Town	Rotherham
19:00 BST	Hugill 3', 54'; Bramall (yellow card) 52'; MacDonald (red card) 69'; James (yellow card) 73'	Report	McLaughlin (yellow card) 45+1'; Macdonald (yellow card) 90+2'	Stadium: New York Stadium; Attendance: 2,265; Referee: Scott Jackson

17 September 2024 Group stage	Mansfield Town	0–3	Bradford City	Mansfield
19:30 BST	Quinn (yellow card) 81'	Report	Oliver 3'; Pointon 36'; Kavanagh (yellow card) 90+1'; Oduor 90+5'	Stadium: Field Mill; Attendance: 1,594; Referee: James Westgate

29 October 2024 Group stage	Mansfield Town	3–0	Newcastle United U21	Mansfield
19:00 GMT	Akins 14'; Quinn 29', 69'; Macdonald (yellow card) 84'	Report	McArthur (yellow card) 48'; Munda (yellow card) 68'; Parkinson (penalty missed) 88'	Stadium: Field Mill; Attendance: 1,311; Referee: Thomas Bramall

== Statistics ==
=== Appearances and goals ===
As of match played 30 April 2025

Players with no appearances are not included on the list
Italics indicate a loaned in player

No.	Pos	Nat	Player	Total		League One		FA Cup		EFL Cup		EFL Trophy	
No.	Pos	Nat	Player	Apps	Goals	Apps	Goals	Apps	Goals	Apps	Goals	Apps	Goals
1	GK	(Northern Ireland) NIR	Christy Pym	42	0	38+0	0	3+0	0	1+0	0	0+0	0
2	DF	(England) ENG	George Williams	14	0	8+3	0	0+1	0	1+0	0	1+0	0
3	DF	(Republic of Ireland) IRL	Stephen McLaughlin	46	2	26+14	1	2+1	1	1+0	0	2+0	0
4	DF	(Wales) WAL	Elliott Hewitt	38	0	30+4	0	2+0	0	0+1	0	1+0	0
5	DF	(England) ENG	Alfie Kilgour	21	0	7+10	0	3+0	0	0+0	0	1+0	0
6	DF	(England) ENG	Baily Cargill	35	1	33+0	1	2+0	0	0+0	0	0+0	0
7	FW	(Grenada) GRN	Lucas Akins	39	4	29+5	2	3+0	1	0+0	0	1+1	1
8	MF	(Wales) WAL	Aaron Lewis	46	2	22+20	2	0+1	0	1+0	0	2+0	0
9	FW	(England) ENG	Jordan Bowery	49	1	28+15	1	2+1	0	0+1	0	1+1	0
10	MF	(England) ENG	George Maris	30	4	16+10	4	1+2	0	0+0	0	1+0	0
11	FW	(Wales) WAL	Will Evans	46	13	35+5	13	1+2	0	1+0	0	1+1	0
12	DF	(Scotland) SCO	Calum Macdonald	9	1	3+3	1	0+0	0	1+0	0	2+0	0
13	GK	(England) ENG	Scott Flinders	10	0	6+1	0	0+0	0	0+0	0	3+0	0
14	DF	(England) ENG	Aden Flint	38	1	13+22	1	1+0	0	1+0	0	1+0	0
15	FW	(Republic of Ireland) IRL	Ben Quinn	7	3	0+1	0	1+1	1	1+0	0	3+0	2
16	MF	(Republic of Ireland) IRL	Stephen Quinn	34	2	12+17	1	3+0	1	0+0	0	1+1	0
17	MF	(Australia) AUS	Keanu Baccus	42	4	31+7	4	1+1	0	0+0	0	1+1	0
18	FW	(England) ENG	Rhys Oates	4	0	1+3	0	0+0	0	0+0	0	0+0	0
19	FW	(England) ENG	Lee Gregory	23	10	17+3	10	1+0	0	0+1	0	1+0	0
20	FW	(England) ENG	Tom Nichols	8	0	1+4	0	0+0	0	1+0	0	2+0	0
21	FW	(New Zealand) NZL	Ben Waine	28	2	2+22	1	1+1	1	0+0	0	2+0	0
22	DF	(England) ENG	Frazer Blake-Tracy	21	0	14+4	0	1+1	0	0+0	0	1+0	0
23	MF	(England) ENG	Deji Oshilaja	43	4	38+1	4	1+0	0	0+1	0	0+2	0
24	MF	(Scotland) SCO	Matthew Craig	6	1	4+1	1	1+0	0	0+0	0	0+0	0
25	MF	(England) ENG	Louis Reed	43	0	38+2	0	2+1	0	0+0	0	0+0	0
27	GK	(Republic of Ireland) IRL	Owen Mason	1	0	1+0	0	0+0	0	0+0	0	0+0	0
28	FW	(Pakistan) PAK	McKeal Abdullah	1	0	0+0	0	0+0	0	0+0	0	0+1	0
29	FW	(England) ENG	Jordan Rhodes	13	1	3+10	1	0+0	0	0+0	0	0+0	0
30	MF	(England) ENG	Caylan Vickers	18	2	13+5	2	0+0	0	0+0	0	0+0	0
31	DF	(England) ENG	Darien Wauchope	1	0	0+0	0	0+0	0	0+0	0	1+0	0
32	DF	(England) ENG	Taylor Anderson	1	0	0+0	0	0+0	0	0+0	0	0+1	0
34	MF	(England) ENG	Finn Flanagan	2	0	0+0	0	0+0	0	0+0	0	1+1	0
35	MF	(Poland) POL	Jakub Kruszynski	1	0	0+0	0	0+0	0	0+0	0	0+1	0
36	MF	(England) ENG	Jayden Chambers	1	0	0+0	0	0+0	0	0+0	0	0+1	0
37	DF	(Cyprus) CYP	Ronnie Kokkinos	1	0	0+0	0	0+0	0	0+0	0	0+1	0
38	DF	(England) ENG	Lewis Warnaby	1	0	0+0	0	0+0	0	0+0	0	0+1	0
41	FW	(United States) USA	Dom Dwyer	8	3	4+4	3	0+0	0	0+0	0	0+0	0
44	MF	(England) ENG	Hiram Boateng	46	2	19+21	2	1+1	0	1+0	0	3+0	0
Players who featured but departed permanently during the season:
26	FW	(England) ENG	Will Swan	2	0	0+1	0	0+0	0	1+0	0	0+0	0
40	MF	(England) ENG	Davis Keillor-Dunn	5	1	3+0	0	0+0	0	0+1	1	0+1	0
