= George Cooper (footballer, born 2002) =

English footballer

Personal information
- Full name: Frank George Cooper
- Date of birth: 25 October 2002 (age 24)
- Place of birth: England
- Height: 1.88 m (6 ft 2 in)
- Position: Defender

Team information
- Current team: Truro City (on loan from Mansfield Town)

Youth career
- Mansfield Town

Senior career*
Years	Team	Apps	(Gls)
2021–	Mansfield Town	2	(0)
2021–2022	→ Kettering Town (loan)	24	(2)
2022–2023	→ Kettering Town (loan)	38	(3)
2024	→ Kidderminster Harriers (loan)	0	(0)
2025	→ Drogheda United (loan)	13	(1)
2026–	→ Truro City (loan)	0	(0)
- * Club domestic league appearances and goals as of 18:21, 6 November 2025 (UTC)

Frank George Cooper (born 25 October 2002) is an English professional footballer who plays as a defender for Truro City on loan from EFL League One club Mansfield Town.

== Playing career ==
Cooper turned professional at Mansfield Town in May 2021 after impressing academy manager Richard Cooper with his consistent performances. He made his senior debut on 31 August under the stewardship of Nigel Clough, coming on for Tyrese Sinclair as a 77th-minute substitute in a 3–1 defeat at Harrogate Town in the EFL Trophy. He was handed a full debut on 5 October, in a 2–1 defeat to Sheffield Wednesday at Field Mill, and was described as "impressive" in Mansfield-based newspaper Chad. On 1 December, he joined Kettering Town – who were coached by former Mansfield manager Paul Cox – of the National League North on an initial one-month loan. He scored a goal from 30-yards in a 4–0 victory at Leamington on 18 December. He added another goal with a header in a 3–0 win over Curzon Ashton at Latimer Park on 15 January. New manager Ian Culverhouse ensured Cooper's loan was extended after he scored two goals in eight appearances. He was absent throughout March due to injury. He was named as man of the match playing in the central role of a back three during a 1–0 home win over Gloucester City on 15 April. Speaking five days later, Cooper stated that he was enjoying his time at the club: "I love the place to be fair and, for my development, I have learnt so much and I am still learning week in and week out. It's massive for me to come and play men's football and get quite a lot of game time." He made a total of 24 appearances for Kettering in the 2021–22 season, scoring two goals. Mansfield opted to extend his contract at the end of the season. In June 2022, Cooper returned to Kettering Town on loan.

In August 2024, Cooper joined National League North side Kidderminster Harriers on an initial one-month loan deal.

On 29 January 2025, Cooper joined League of Ireland Premier Division side Drogheda United on a season-long loan deal. He scored 1 goal in 18 appearances in all competitions during his loan spell with the club.

On 15 January 2026, Cooper joined National League side Truro City on loan until the end of the season.

== Personal life ==
As of October 2021, Cooper was studying sports science at Nottingham Trent University's Mansfield campus.

== Career statistics ==
As of match played 17 October 2025

Club	Season	League			National Cup		League Cup		Other		Total	
Club	Season	Division	Apps	Goals	Apps	Goals	Apps	Goals	Apps	Goals	Apps	Goals
Mansfield Town	2021–22	EFL League Two	0	0	0	0	0	0	3 (Note: Appearance(s) in the EFL Trophy)	0	3	0
Mansfield Town	2022–23	EFL League Two	0	0	0	0	0	0	0	0	0	0
Mansfield Town	2023–24	EFL League Two	2	0	0	0	0	0	3	1	5	1
Mansfield Town	2024–25	EFL League One	0	0	0	0	0	0	0	0	0	0
Mansfield Town	Total		2	0	0	0	0	0	6	1	8	1
Kettering Town (loan)	2021–22	National League North	24	2	0	0	–		0	0	24	2
Kettering Town (loan)	2022–23	National League North	38	3	0	0	–		1 (Note: Appearance(s) in the FA Trophy)	0	39	3
Kidderminster Harriers (loan)	2023–24	National League North	0	0	0	0	–		0	0	0	0
Drogheda United (loan)	2025	LOI Premier Division	13	1	2	0	–		3 (Note: 1 appearance in the President of Ireland's Cup; 2 appearances in the Leinster Senior Cup)	0	18	1
Career total			77	6	2	0	0	0	10	1	89	7

== Honours ==
Mansfield Town

- EFL League Two third-place promotion: 2023–24
