= 2023–24 Mansfield Town F.C. season =

127th season in existence of Mansfield Town FC

Mansfield Town
2023–24 season
- Owner: Carolyn & John Radford
- Chief Executive: David Sharpe
- Manager: Nigel Clough
- Stadium: Field Mill
- League Two: 3rd (promoted)
- FA Cup: First round
- EFL Cup: Fourth round
- EFL Trophy: Group stage

The 2023–24 season was the 127th season in the history of Mansfield Town and their eleventh consecutive season in League Two. The club participated in League Two, the FA Cup, the EFL Cup, and the 2023–24 EFL Trophy.

== Current squad ==
As of 28 February 2024

No.	Name	Position	Nationality	Place of birth	Date of birth (age)	Signed from	Date signed	Fee	Contract end
Goalkeepers
1	Christy Pym	GK	(England)	Exeter	24 April 1995 (age 31)	Peterborough United	11 July 2023	Undisclosed	30 June 2025
13	Scott Flinders	GK	(England)	Rotherham	12 June 1986 (age 40)	Cheltenham Town	1 July 2022	Free transfer	30 June 2024
23	Owen Mason	GK	(Republic of Ireland)		24 March 2004 (age 22)	Academy	1 July 2022	—N/a	30 June 2024
33	Louie Turner	GK	(England)			Academy	29 August 2023	—N/a	30 June 2024
Defenders
2	Callum Johnson	RB	(England)	Yarm	23 October 1996 (age 30)	(Scotland) Ross County	13 January 2023	Undisclosed	30 June 2024
3	Stephen McLaughlin	LB	(Republic of Ireland)	Donegal	14 June 1990 (age 36)	Southend United	11 September 2020	Free transfer	30 June 2024
4	Elliott Hewitt	RB	(Wales)	Rhyl	30 May 1994 (age 32)	Grimsby Town	1 July 2021	Free transfer	30 June 2025
5	Alfie Kilgour	CB	(England)	Bath	18 May 1998 (age 28)	Bristol Rovers	12 January 2023	Undisclosed	30 June 2025
6	Baily Cargill	CB	(England)	Winchester	5 July 1995 (age 31)	Forest Green Rovers	1 July 2023	Free transfer	30 June 2025
11	Calum Macdonald	LB	(Scotland)	(England) Nottingham	18 December 1997 (age 28)	Bristol Rovers	1 July 2023	Free transfer	30 June 2025
14	Aden Flint	CB	(England)	Pinxton	11 July 1989 (age 37)	Stoke City	3 August 2023	Free transfer	30 June 2025
15	Aaron Lewis	LB	(Wales)	Swansea	26 June 1998 (age 28)	(Wales) Newport County	11 July 2023	Free transfer	30 June 2025
19	George Cooper	CB	(England)		25 October 2002 (age 24)	Academy	1 July 2021	—N/a	30 June 2024
22	George Williams	RB	(England)	Hillingdon	14 April 1993 (age 33)	Cambridge United	17 July 2023	Free transfer	30 June 2024
27	Taylor Anderson	RB	(England)		5 November 2004 (age 22)	Academy	1 July 2023	—N/a	30 June 2024
31	Darien Wauchope	LB	(England)			Academy	26 August 2023	—N/a	30 June 2024
Midfielders
8	Ollie Clarke	CM	(England)	Sea Mills	29 June 1992 (age 34)	Bristol Rovers	1 July 2020	Free transfer	30 June 2024
10	George Maris	CM	(England)	Sheffield	6 March 1996 (age 30)	Cambridge United	28 July 2020	Undisclosed	30 June 2024
16	Stephen Quinn	CM	(Republic of Ireland)	Dublin	1 April 1986 (age 40)	Burton Albion	1 July 2021	Free transfer	30 June 2024
24	Lewis Brunt	DM	(England)	Birmingham	6 November 2000 (age 26)	Leicester City	25 August 2023	Loan	31 May 2024
25	Louis Reed	CM	(England)	Barnsley	25 July 1997 (age 29)	Swindon Town	15 January 2023	Undisclosed	30 June 2025
29	Charlie Carter	DM	(England)			Academy	29 August 2023	—N/a	30 June 2024
32	Jakub Kruszynski	AM	(Poland)			Academy	29 August 2023	—N/a	30 June 2024
34	Finn Flanagan	CM	(England)			Academy	12 May 2023	—N/a	30 June 2024
40	Davis Keillor-Dunn	AM	(England)	Sunderland	2 November 1997 (age 29)	Burton Albion	31 January 2023	Undisclosed	30 June 2025
44	Hiram Boateng	CM	(England)	Wandsworth	8 January 1996 (age 30)	Milton Keynes Dons	1 July 2022	Free transfer	30 June 2024
Forwards
7	Lucas Akins	RW	(Grenada)	(England) Huddersfield	25 February 1989 (age 37)	Burton Albion	20 January 2022	Free transfer	30 June 2024
9	Jordan Bowery	CF	(England)	Nottingham	2 July 1991 (age 35)	Milton Keynes Dons	1 July 2020	Free transfer	30 June 2024
12	James Gale	CF	(England)		20 December 2001 (age 24)	Long Eaton United	1 September 2021	Undisclosed	30 June 2024
18	Rhys Oates	LW	(England)	Pontefract	4 December 1994 (age 31)	Hartlepool United	8 July 2021	Free transfer	30 June 2024
20	Tom Nichols	CF	(England)	Wellington	28 August 1993 (age 33)	Gillingham	1 February 2024	Undisclosed	30 June 2025
26	Will Swan	CF	(England)	Mansfield	26 October 2000 (age 26)	Nottingham Forest	1 July 2023	Undisclosed	30 June 2026
28	McKeal Abdullah	CF	(Pakistan)		7 July 2005 (age 21)	Academy	1 July 2021	—N/a	30 June 2024
Out on Loan
17	Anthony Hartigan	CM	(England)	Kingston upon Thames	27 January 2000 (age 26)	AFC Wimbledon	4 August 2022	Free transfer	30 June 2024
35	John-Joe O'Toole	CB	(Republic of Ireland)	(England) Harrow	30 September 1988 (age 38)	Free agent	23 October 2021	—N/a	30 June 2024

== Transfers ==
=== In ===
Date	Pos	Player	Transferred from	Fee	Ref
1 July 2023	CB	Baily Cargill (ENG)	Forest Green Rovers (ENG)	Free transfer	
1 July 2023	LB	Calum Macdonald (SCO)	Bristol Rovers (ENG)	Free transfer	
1 July 2023	CF	Will Swan (ENG)	Nottingham Forest (ENG)	Undisclosed	
11 July 2023	RB	Aaron Lewis (WAL)	Newport County (WAL)	Free transfer	
11 July 2023	GK	Christy Pym (ENG)	Peterborough United (ENG)	Undisclosed	
17 July 2023	RB	George Williams (ENG)	Cambridge United (ENG)	Free transfer	
3 August 2023	CB	Aden Flint (ENG)	Stoke City (ENG)	Free transfer	
1 February 2024	CF	Tom Nichols (ENG)	Gillingham (ENG)	Undisclosed	

=== Out ===
Date	Pos	Player	Transferred to	Fee	Ref
30 June 2023	CF	Danny Johnson (ENG)	Walsall (ENG)	Released	
30 June 2023	CF	Jimmy Knowles (ENG)	Boston United (ENG)	Released	
30 June 2023	LB	Kieran Wallace (ENG)	Hartlepool United (ENG)	Free transfer	

=== Loaned in ===
Date	Pos	Player	Loaned from	Until	Ref
25 August 2023	DM	Lewis Brunt (ENG)	Leicester City (ENG)	End of season	

=== Loaned out ===
Date	Pos	Player	Loaned to	Until	Ref
15 August 2023	CM	Anthony Hartigan (ENG)	Barnet (ENG)	End of season	
1 February 2024	CB	John-Joe O'Toole (IRL)	AFC Wimbledon (ENG)	End of season	

== Pre-season and friendlies ==
On 17 May, Mansfield Town announced their 2023 pre-season schedule, with matches against Retford United, Alfreton Town, Rotherham United, Oldham Athletic and Matlock Town along with a training camp in Scotland between 17 and 21 July. In June, a further fixture was added to the schedule, against Barnsley. A seventh friendly against Long Eaton United was later added. On 24 July, a behind closed doors friendly against Heart of Midlothain was confirmed.

Win Draw Loss Fixtures

11 July 2023 Friendly	Retford United	0–8	Mansfield Town	Retford
19:00 BST		Report	Gale 26'; Akins 48', 83', 84'; 50' (o.g.); Johnson 70'; Swan 82'; Keillor-Dunn 90'	Stadium: Cannon Park; Attendance: 1,027

15 July 2023 Friendly	Alfreton Town	0–4	Mansfield Town	Alfreton
15:00 BST		Report	Swan 6'; Oates 60'; Kruszynski 71'; Macdonald 88'	Stadium: North Street; Attendance: 1,350

18 July 2023 Friendly	Airdrieonians	0–8	Mansfield Town	St Andrews, Scotland
15:00 BST		Report	Akins 7', 12', 28'; Gale 24'; Quinn; Lewis; Boateng 66'; Macdonald	Stadium: University of St Andrews; Attendance: 0 (behind closed doors)

22 July 2023 Friendly	Mansfield Town	2–4	Rotherham United	Mansfield
15:00 BST	Quinn 4'; Oates 40'	Report	Trialist 2'; Kelly 26', 54', 57'	Stadium: Field Mill; Attendance: 2,154 (437 Rotherham fans); Referee: Declan Bourne

25 July 2023 Friendly	Mansfield Town	Cancelled	Barnsley	Mansfield
19:00 BST				Stadium: Field Mill
Note: Fixture was cancelled on Barnsley's request.

25 July 2023 Friendly	Heart of Midlothian	1–3	Mansfield Town	Gorgie, Scotland
19:00 BST	Boyce	Report	Keillor-Dunn 57'; Oates 78'; Bowery 88' (pen.)	Stadium: Tynecastle Park; Attendance: 0 (behind closed doors)

26 July 2023 Friendly	Long Eaton United	0–1	Mansfield Town	Long Eaton
19:45 BST		Report	Abdullah 80' (pen.)	Stadium: Grange Park

29 July 2023 Friendly	Oldham Athletic	0–3	Mansfield Town	Oldham
15:00 BST		Report	Akins 34', 53'; Oates 58'	Stadium: Boundary Park; Attendance: 2,425 (213 Stags' fans); Referee: Ben Wyatt

1 August 2023 Friendly	Matlock Town	2–4	Mansfield Town	Matlock
19:45 BST	Styche 1'; Wakefield 40'	Report	Maris 27'; Bowery 31', 60'; Kruszynski 55'	Stadium: Causeway Lane

== Competitions ==
=== Overall record ===
Competition	First match	Last match	Starting round	Final position	Record							
Competition	First match	Last match	Starting round	Final position	Pld	W	D	L	GF	GA	GD	Win %
League Two	5 August	27 April	Matchday 1	3rd	46	24	14	8	90	47	+43	52.17
FA Cup	4 November	4 November	First round	First round	1	0	0	1	1	2	−1	0.00
EFL Cup	8 August	31 October	First round	Fourth round	4	1	2	1	5	4	+1	25.00
EFL Trophy	10 October	21 November	Group stage	Group stage	3	1	0	2	4	5	−1	33.33
Total					54	26	16	12	100	58	+42	48.15

Last updated: 29 March 2024
Source: Soccerway

=== League Two ===
==== League table ====
Pos	Team	Pld	W	D	L	GF	GA	GD	Pts	Promotion, qualification or relegation
1	Stockport County (C, P)	46	27	11	8	96	48	+48	92	Promoted to EFL League One
2	Wrexham (P)	46	26	10	10	89	52	+37	88	Promoted to EFL League One
3	Mansfield Town (P)	46	24	14	8	90	47	+43	86	Promoted to EFL League One
4	Milton Keynes Dons	46	23	9	14	83	68	+15	78	Qualified for League Two play-offs
5	Doncaster Rovers	46	21	8	17	73	68	+5	71	Qualified for League Two play-offs
6	Crewe Alexandra	46	19	14	13	69	65	+4	71	Qualified for League Two play-offs

Source: EFL Official Website
Rules for classification: 1) Points; 2) Goal difference; 3) Number of goals scored; 4) Head-to-head results; 5) Wins; 6) Away goals; 7) Penalty points (sec 9.5); 8) 12-point sending off offences
(C) Champions; (P) Promoted

==== Results summary ====
Overall								Home						Away					
Pld	W	D	L	GF	GA	GD	Pts	W	D	L	GF	GA	GD	W	D	L	GF	GA	GD
45	24	13	8	89	46	+43	85	14	7	3	44	22	+22	10	6	5	45	24	+21

Last updated: 20 April 2024.
Source: Soccerway

==== Results by round ====
Round	1	2	3	4	5	6	7	8	9	10	11	12	13	15	16	17	18	19	20	22	23	24	25	26	27	28	29	30	31	32	33	34	35	36	21^{2}	37	38	39	40	41	43	14^{1}	44	42^{3}	45	46
Ground	A	H	A	A	H	H	A	A	H	A	H	H	A	A	H	A	H	A	H	A	A	H	H	A	H	A	H	A	H	A	H	A	H	A	H	H	A	A	H	A	H	H	A	H	H	A
Result	D	W	D	D	W	D	W	D	W	D	D	D	W	W	W	W	W	L	D	W	W	W	D	W	L	D	D	L	W	W	W	L	W	W	L	W	L	W	D	L	L	W	W	W	W	D
Position	11	4	5	10	7	8	3	5	3	5	7	5	3	4	4	3	2	3	4	4	4	3	2	3	3	3	3	3	2	2	2	2	1	1	1	1	1	1	1	2	2	3	3	2	2	3

Updated to match(es) played on 27 April 2024. Source:
A = Away; H = Home; W = Win; D = Draw; L = Loss; P = Postponed
Notes:
- ^{1} Matchday 14 (vs Forest Green Rovers) was postponed due to a waterlogged pitch.
- ^{2} Matchday 21 (vs illegal entity) was postponed due to a waterlogged pitch.
- ^{3} Matchday 42 (vs Accrington Stanley) was postponed due to a waterlogged pitch.

==== Matches ====
On 22 June, the EFL League Two fixtures were released.

Win Draw Loss Fixtures

5 August 2023 1	Crewe Alexandra	2–2	Mansfield Town	Crewe
15:00 BST	Demetriou 32'; Offord (yellow card) 37'; Adebisi 60'; Thomas (yellow card) 90'	Report	Keillor-Dunn 22', 26' (yellow card) 58'; Macdonald (red card) 58'; Kilgour (yellow card) 59'; Quinn (yellow card) 63'; Reed (yellow card) 87'	Stadium: Gresty Road; Attendance: 5,574; Referee: Ben Atkinson

12 August 2023 2	Mansfield Town	3–0	Morecambe	Mansfield
15:00 BST	Akins 45+1', 87' (pen.); Keillor-Dunn 62'; Cargill (yellow card) 63'; Lewis (yellow card) 70'	Report	McKiernan (yellow card) 45'; Love (yellow card) 45+1'	Stadium: Field Mill; Attendance: 6,695; Referee: Scott Simpson

15 August 2023 3	Doncaster Rovers	2–2	Mansfield Town	Doncaster
19:45 BST	Nixon 20', (yellow card) 64'; Ironside 76'	Report	Reed 42'; Boateng (yellow card) 43'; Maris 80'; Clarke (yellow card) 90+3'; Swan (yellow card) 90+4'	Stadium: Eco-Power Stadium; Attendance: 7,793; Referee: Lewis Smith

19 August 2023 4	Grimsby Town	1–1	Mansfield Town	Cleethorpes
15:00 BST	Eisa 6'	Report	Oates 59'	Stadium: Blundell Park; Attendance: 7,100; Referee: Will Finnie

26 August 2023 5	Mansfield Town	3–2	Stockport County	Mansfield
15:00 BST	Maris 14'; Reed (yellow card) 52'; Keillor-Dunn 69', 80'	Report	Barry 6'; Horsfall 25'	Stadium: Field Mill; Attendance: 7,492; Referee: Ollie Yates

2 September 2023 6	Mansfield Town	0–0	Bradford City	Mansfield
15:00 BST	Macdonald (yellow card) 68'; Gale (yellow card) 75'	Report	Smallwood (yellow card) 23'; Walker (yellow card) 55'; Platt (yellow card) 81'; Oyegoke (yellow card) 90+4'	Stadium: Field Mill; Attendance: 8,525; Referee: Leigh Doughty

9 September 2023 7	Accrington Stanley	0–3	Mansfield Town	Accrington
15:00 BST	Rich-Baghuelou (yellow card) 6'		Keillor-Dunn 29'; Maris 36' (yellow card) 47'; Lewis 75'	Stadium: Crown Ground

16 September 2023 8	Colchester United	1–1	Mansfield Town	Colchester
15:00 BST	Taylor 30' (yellow card) 75'; Egbo (yellow card) 80'; Fevrier (yellow card) 87'; Chilvers (yellow card) 89'	Report	Reed (yellow card) 64'; Cargill (yellow card) 73'; Keillor-Dunn 90'; Johnson (yellow card) 90+2'	Stadium: Colchester Community Stadium; Attendance: 3,740; Referee: Andy Davies

23 September 2023 9	Mansfield Town	1–0	Barrow	Mansfield
15:00 BST	Macdonald (yellow card) 70'; Clarke 72'; Lewis (yellow card) 82'	Report	Gotts (yellow card) 82'; Tiensia (red card) 83'	Stadium: Field Mill; Attendance: 6,714; Referee: Marc Edwards

30 September 2023 10	Gillingham	1–1	Mansfield Town	Gillingham
15:00 BST	Bonne 2'; Coleman (yellow card) 37'; Malone (yellow card) 40'; Williams (yellow card) 59'; Ogie (yellow card) 90+5'	Report	Macdonald (yellow card) 6'; Keillor-Dunn 36' (yellow card) 83'	Stadium: Priestfield Stadium; Attendance: 6,488; Referee: Jacob Miles

3 October 2023 11	Mansfield Town	0–0	Wrexham	Mansfield
19:45 BST	Clarke (yellow card) 18'; Cargill (yellow card) 19'	Report	Evans (yellow card) 69'	Stadium: Field Mill; Attendance: 8,613; Referee: Adam Herceg

7 October 2023 12	Mansfield Town	0–0	AFC Wimbledon	Mansfield
15:00 BST	Bowery (yellow card) 51'; Cargill (yellow card) 90+4'	Report	Tilley (penalty missed) 27'; Currie (yellow card) 54'; Johnson (yellow card) 66'	Stadium: Field Mill; Attendance: 7,127; Referee: Martin Woods

14 October 2023 13	Notts County	1–4	Mansfield Town	Nottingham
12:30 BST	Crowley 3'; McGoldrick (yellow card) 67'	Report	Reed 24'; Cargill (yellow card) 47' (goal) 70'; Flint 74'; Akins 81'	Stadium: Meadow Lane; Attendance: 16,638; Referee: Scott Oldham

24 October 2023 15	Harrogate Town	1–4	Mansfield Town	Harrogate
19:45 GMT	Ramsay (yellow card) 66'; Sutton 80'	Report	Brunt 8' (yellow card) 90+1'; Akins 36', 38'; Macdonald (yellow card) 69'; Maris 73'; Johnson (yellow card) 83'	Stadium: Wetherby Road; Attendance: 2,304; Referee: Stephen Martin

28 October 2023 16	Mansfield Town	2–1	Walsall	Mansfield
15:00 GMT	Flint 16'; Brunt (yellow card) 38'; Gale (yellow card) 59'; Bowery 71'; Boateng (yellow card) 86'	Report	Knowles (yellow card) 40'; Stirk 52'; Comley (yellow card) 59'	Stadium: Field Mill; Attendance: 7,641; Referee: David Rock

11 November 2023 17	Salford City	1–2	Mansfield Town	Kersal
15:00 BST	Smith 22'; Ingram (yellow card) 87'	Report	Bowery 19'; Reed (yellow card) 31'; Keillor-Dunn 37'; Macdonald (yellow card) 44'	Stadium: Moor Lane; Attendance: 3,281; Referee: Ross Joyce

18 November 2023 18	Mansfield Town	2–0	Newport County	Mansfield
15:00 GMT	Keillor-Dunn 4', 52'; Oates (penalty missed) 31'	Report	Bogle (yellow card) 33'; Bennett (yellow card) 58'; Morris (yellow card) 61'; Clarke (yellow card) 81'	Stadium: Field Mill; Attendance: 6,877; Referee: Thomas Kirk

25 November 2023 19	Swindon Town	2–1	Mansfield Town	Swindon
15:00 GMT	Young 38', 90+3' (yellow card) 90+4'	Report	Maris (yellow card) 37'; Akins 49'	Stadium: The County Ground; Attendance: 8,322; Referee: Lee Swabey

28 November 2023 20	Mansfield Town	2–2	Tranmere Rovers	Mansfield
19:45 GMT	Reed (yellow card) 25'; Oates 37'; Keillor-Dunn (yellow card) 52'; Swan 79'	Report	Jolley 13'; Turnbull (yellow card) 36' (yellow-red card) 90+3'; Morris (yellow card) 39'; Apter 62'; Leake (yellow card) 67'	Stadium: Field Mill; Attendance: 6,421; Referee: Matthew Corlett

16 December 2023 22	Crawley Town	1–3	Mansfield Town	Crawley
15:00 GMT	Wright (yellow card) 8'; Conroy (yellow card) 25'; Orsi 36' (pen.); Gladwin (yellow card) 38'; Kelly (yellow card) 57'; Williams (yellow card) 68' (yellow-red card) 68'	Report	Cargill 12'; Oates (yellow card) 26'; Clarke (yellow card) 34'; Keillor-Dunn 56'; Brunt (yellow card) 59'; Maris 64'	Stadium: Broadfield Stadium; Attendance: 2,817; Referee: Scott Simpson

23 December 2023 23	Sutton United	0–2	Mansfield Town	Sutton
15:00 GMT	Hart (yellow card) 61'	Report	Quinn 25'; Akins 75'; Clarke (yellow card) 82'	Stadium: Gander Green Lane; Attendance: 2,762; Referee: Alex Chilowicz

26 December 2023 24	Mansfield Town	2–0	Grimsby Town	Mansfield
12:30 GMT	Keillor-Dunn 19'; Johnson (yellow card) 30'; Pym (yellow card) 45+4'; Maris 45+5', (yellow card) 67'	Report	Rodgers (yellow card) 21'	Stadium: Field Mill; Attendance: 8,125; Referee: Ollie Yates

29 December 2023 25	Mansfield Town	1–1	Doncaster Rovers	Mansfield
19:45 GMT	Johnson 21'; Swan (yellow card) 90+2'	Report	Ironside 59'; Bailey (yellow card) 85'	Stadium: Field Mill; Attendance: 7,644; Referee: Scott Jackson

1 January 2024 26	Stockport County	0–2	Mansfield Town	Stockport
15:00 GMT	Bailey (yellow card) 42'	Report	Clarke (yellow card) 5'; Maris 49'; McLaughlin (yellow card) 68'; Reed (yellow card) 77'; Keillor-Dunn 90+12'	Stadium: Edgeley Park; Attendance: 10,334; Referee: Daniel Middleton

6 January 2024 27	Mansfield Town	0–1	Crewe Alexandra	Mansfield
15:00 GMT	Flint (yellow card) 12'; Maris (yellow card) 45+2'	Report	White 2'; Thomas (yellow card) 63'; Tracey (yellow card) 90+3'	Stadium: Field Mill; Attendance: 7,295; Referee: Matthew Corlett

13 January 2024 28	Morecambe	1–1	Mansfield Town	Morecambe
15:00 GMT	Senior (yellow card) 60'; Mayor (yellow card) 72'; Brown 78' (yellow card) 89'	Report	Cargill 61'	Stadium: Mazuma Stadium; Attendance: 4,387; Referee: Seb Stockbridge

23 January 2024 29	Mansfield Town	1–1	Sutton United	Mansfield
19:45 GMT	Brunt (yellow card) 21'; Quinn (yellow card) 29'; Maris 35'	Report	Angol 8'; Kizzi (yellow card) 28'	Stadium: Field Mill; Referee: Edward Duckworth
Note: Fixture was originally scheduled for 20 January, but was postponed due to a frozen pitch.

27 January 2024 30	AFC Wimbledon	2–1	Mansfield Town	Wimbledon
15:00 GMT	Chaaban 45+2'; Little (yellow card) 68'; Sasu (yellow card) 72'; Lewis (yellow card) 86'; Curtis (yellow card) 90+7', (goal) 90+7'	Report	Bowery (red card) 20'; Reed (yellow card) 45+1'; Brunt (yellow card) 58'; Swan 62'; Quinn (yellow card) 82', (red card); Keillor-Dunn (yellow card) 90+9'; Boateng (yellow card) 90+9'	Stadium: Plough Lane; Attendance: 8,114; Referee: Jacob Miles

3 February 2024 31	Mansfield Town	1–0	Notts County	Mansfield
15:00 GMT	Keillor-Dunn 8' (yellow card) 50'; Clarke (yellow card) 59'; Flint (yellow card) 86'; Boateng (yellow card) 90+5'	Report		Stadium: Field Mill; Attendance: 8,667; Referee: Thomas Kirk

10 February 2024 32	Forest Green Rovers	0–4	Mansfield Town	Nailsworth
15:00 GMT	Robson (yellow card) 16'; Thompson (yellow card) 54'	Report	Clarke 11', 90+7'; Nichols 69'; Swan 78'	Stadium: The New Lawn; Attendance: 2,240; Referee: Sunny Sukhvir Gill

13 February 2024 33	Mansfield Town	9–2	Harrogate Town	Mansfield
19:45 GMT	Akins 13' (pen.), 61'; Boateng (yellow card) 13', (goal) 20', 30', 50'; Nichols 34'; Keillor-Dunn 39'; Swan 75', 77'	Report	Thomson 54'; Odoh 55'	Stadium: Field Mill; Attendance: 6,437; Referee: Scott Oldham

17 February 2024 34	Walsall	2–1	Mansfield Town	Bescot
15:00 GMT	Matt 47'; Adegboyega 65'; Gordon (yellow card) 79'; Knowles (yellow card) 85'	Report	Clarke (yellow card) 37'; Quinn 50'; Bowery (yellow card) 90+4'	Stadium: Bescot Stadium; Attendance: 6,625; Referee: Thomas Parsons

24 February 2024 35	Mansfield Town	5–1	Salford City	Mansfield
15:00 GMT	Swan 18'; Cargill 45+8'; Keillor-Dunn 57'; Akins 81'; Boateng 90+8'	Report	Luamba 42'	Stadium: Field Mill; Attendance: 7,166; Referee: Craig Hicks

2 March 2024 36	Newport County	0–1	Mansfield Town	Newport
15:00 GMT	Wildig (yellow card) 10'; Lewis (yellow card) 51'	Report	Maris 50'	Stadium: Rodney Parade; Attendance: 4,833; Referee: Adam Herczeg

5 March 2023 21	Mansfield Town	1–2	Milton Keynes Dons	Mansfield
15:00 GMT	Akins (penalty missed) 15'; Quinn 15'; Cargill (yellow card) 45+2'; Boateng (yellow card) 85'	Report	Gilbey 20'; Dennis (yellow card) 50' (goal) 54'	Stadium: Field Mill; Attendance: 7,414; Referee: Lee Swabey
Note: Fixture was originally scheduled for 9 December, but was postponed due to a waterlogged pitch.

9 March 2024 37	Mansfield Town	3–2	Swindon Town	Mansfield
15:00 GMT	Akins 4' (yellow card) 61'; Keillor-Dunn 51'; Swan 67'	Report	McCarthy (yellow card) 41'; Glatzel 50'; Drinan 59'	Stadium: Field Mill; Attendance: 7,257; Referee: David Rock

12 March 2024 38	Tranmere Rovers	2–1	Mansfield Town	Birkenhead
19:45 GMT	Hendry 12'; Walker (yellow card) 54'; Apter 56'; Yarney (yellow card) 87'	Report	Swan 39'; Maris (yellow card) 46'; Reed (yellow card) 54'; Williams (yellow card) 59'; Quinn (yellow card) 89'	Stadium: Prenton Park; Attendance: 5,488; Referee: Ben Toner

16 March 2024 39	Bradford City	1–5	Mansfield Town	Bradford
15:00 GMT	Walker (yellow card) 8'; Cook 72'; Tomkinson (yellow card) 90+1'	Report	Cargill 10'; Akins 14'; Keillor-Dunn 18', (yellow card) 20'; Swan 45+2'; Lewis 86'; Reed (yellow card) 90+2'	Stadium: Valley Parade; Attendance: 16,496; Referee: Martin Coy

23 March 2024 40	Mansfield Town	1–1	Colchester United	Mansfield
12:30 GMT	Keillor-Dunn (yellow card) 49'; Brunt 63'	Report	Anderson 12'; Ihionvien (yellow card) 16'; Hall (yellow card) 45+2'; Tovide (yellow card) 74'; Hopper (yellow card) 75'	Stadium: Field Mill; Attendance: 7,517; Referee: Simon Mather
Note: Fixture was initially scheduled for a 15:00 kick-off, but was moved for live Sky Sports broadcasting.

29 March 2024 41	Wrexham	2–0	Mansfield Town	Wrexham
15:00 BST	McClean (yellow card) 3'; Mullin 32' (Cannon) 67' (pen.)	Report	Clarke (yellow card) 45'; Reed (yellow card) 69'; Lewis (yellow card) 71'	Stadium: Racecourse Ground; Attendance: 12,494; Referee: Lewis Smith

6 April 2024 43	Mansfield Town	1–4	Crawley Town	Mansfield
15:00 BST	Boateng 80'	Report	Gordon 4' (yellow card) 64'; Tsaroulla 24'; Wright (yellow card) 45+1'; Orsi 55'; Lolos 56'; Kelly (yellow card) 81'	Stadium: Field Mill; Attendance: 7,342; Referee: Ollie Yates

9 April 2024 14	Mansfield Town	1–0	Forest Green Rovers	Mansfield
19:45 BST	Nichols 20', (yellow card) 77'; Lewis (yellow card) 84'; Clarke (yellow card) 90+5'	Report	Inniss (yellow card) 90+5'	Stadium: Field Mill; Attendance: 7,245; Referee: Thomas Parsons
Note: Fixture was originally scheduled for 21 October and 16 January, but was postponed due to a waterlogged pitch from Storm Babet and a frozen pitch respectively.

13 April 2024 44	Milton Keynes Dons	1–4	Mansfield Town	Denbigh
15:00 BST	Dean 13' (yellow card) 51'; Gilbey (yellow card) 89'; Harvie (yellow card) 90'	Report	Swan (yellow card) 27'; Hewitt 30'; Clarke (yellow card) 32'; Keillor-Dunn 51', 90'; Williams (yellow card) 69'; Boateng (yellow card) 84'; Lewis (yellow card) 88'; Gale 90+2'	Stadium: Stadium MK; Attendance: 11,212; Referee: Ben Speedie

16 April 2024 42	Mansfield Town	2–1	Accrington Stanley	Mansfield
19:45 BST	Maris 2'; Quinn 63'	Report	Hills (yellow card) 35'; Coyle (yellow card) 53'; Leigh 85'	Stadium: Field Mill; Attendance: 7,942; Referee: Charles Breakspear
Note: Fixture was originally scheduled for 1 April, but was postponed due to a waterlogged pitch.

20 April 2024 45	Mansfield Town	2–1	Gillingham	Mansfield
15:00 BST	Boateng (yellow card) 30'; Keillor-Dunn 77'; McLaughlin 80'	Report	Dieng 19'; Jefferies (yellow card) 64'; Ehmer (yellow card) 86'	Stadium: Field Mill; Attendance: 8,150; Referee: Sam Purkiss

27 April 2024 46	Barrow	1–1	Mansfield Town	Barrow-in-Furness
15:00 BST	Spence 58'	Report	Maris 16'	Stadium: Holker Street; Attendance: 5,668; Referee: Keith Stroud

=== FA Cup ===
Mansfield were drawn at home to Wrexham in the first round.

Win Draw Loss Fixtures

4 November 2023 First Round	Mansfield Town	1–2	Wrexham	Mansfield
19:45 GMT	Oates 60'; Reed (yellow card) 68'	Report	Dalby 23'; Evans (yellow card) 32'; Mullin 58'; Davies (yellow card) 90+3'	Stadium: Field Mill; Attendance: 6,158; Referee: Edward Duckworth

=== EFL Cup ===
Mansfield were drawn at home to Grimsby Town in the first round, away to Sheffield Wednesday in the second round, then back at home against Peterborough United in the third round and Port Vale in the fourth round.

Win Draw Loss Fixtures

8 August 2023 First round	Mansfield Town	2–0	Grimsby Town	Mansfield
19:30 BST	Akins 28' (pen.); Oates 55'	Report	Cartwright (yellow card) 27'; Green (yellow card) 60'	Stadium: Field Mill; Attendance: 3,123; Referee: Scott Jackson

29 August 2023 Second round	Sheffield Wednesday	1–1 (4–5 p)	Mansfield Town	Sheffield
19:45 BST	Musaba 28'; Bakinson (yellow card) 44'; Smith (yellow card) 87'	Report	Oates 85'	Stadium: Hillsborough Stadium; Attendance: 10,724; Referee: Sunny Gill
	Penalties
	Smith (penalty scored); Windass (penalty scored); Bannan (penalty scored); Vaulks (penalty missed); Gregory (penalty scored); Palmer (penalty missed)		Bowery (penalty scored); Maris (penalty scored); Keillor-Dunn (penalty scored); Swan (penalty missed); Oates (penalty scored); Flint (penalty scored)

26 September 2023 Third round	Mansfield Town	2–2 (3–1 p)	Peterborough United	Mansfield
19:45 BST	Swan 5' (pen.); Reed (yellow card) 29'; Flint (yellow card) 87'; Akins 90+3' (pen.)	Report	Collins (yellow card) 4'; Clarke-Harris 30', 47'; Burrows (yellow card) 68'; Mason-Clark (yellow card) 87'	Stadium: Field Mill; Attendance: 4,372; Referee: Seb Stockbridge
	Penalties
	Akins (penalty scored); Bowery (penalty scored); Flint (penalty missed); Clarke (penalty missed); Keillor-Dunn (penalty scored)		Clarke-Harris (penalty missed); Edwards (penalty missed); Mason-Clark (penalty scored); Knight (penalty missed)

31 October 2023 Fourth round	Mansfield Town	0–1	Port Vale	Mansfield
19:45 GMT	Flint (yellow card) 70'	Report	Devine 50'; Smith (yellow card) 66'	Stadium: Field Mill; Attendance: 7,432; Referee: Thomas Bramall

=== EFL Trophy ===
The Group stage draw was finalised on 22 June 2023.

Pos	Div	Team	Pld	W	PW	PL	L	GF	GA	GD	Pts	Qualification
1	L2	Doncaster Rovers	3	2	0	0	1	6	4	+2	6	Advance to Round 2
2	L1	Burton Albion	3	2	0	0	1	5	3	+2	6	Advance to Round 2
3	L2	Mansfield Town	3	1	0	0	2	4	5	−1	3	
4	ACA	Everton U21	3	1	0	0	2	1	4	−3	3	

Updated to match(es) played on 7 November 2023. Source: EFL.com

Win Draw Loss Fixtures

10 October 2023 Group stage	Mansfield Town	3–2	Doncaster Rovers	Mansfield
19:00 BST	Gale 11' (pen.), 13'; Macdonald (yellow card) 19'; Brunt (yellow card) 45+8'; Cargill (yellow card) 49'; Johnson 88'	Report	Sotona (yellow card) 26'; Close 38'; Flint (yellow card) 52'; Ironside 64'; Westbrooke (yellow card) 66'; Molyneux (yellow card) 71'	Stadium: Field Mill; Attendance: 1,486; Referee: Ruebyn Ricardo

7 November 2023 Group stage	Mansfield Town	0–1	Everton U21	Mansfield
19:00 GMT		Report	John (yellow card) 70'; Chermiti (yellow card) 73' (goal) 90+1' (pen.)	Stadium: Field Mill; Attendance: 819; Referee: Neil Hair

21 November 2023 Group stage	Burton Albion	2–1	Mansfield Town	Burton upon Trent
19:00 GMT	Oshilaja (yellow card) 34'; Stockton 34'; Hamer 53'	Report	Cooper 21'; Flint (yellow card) 83'; Bowery (yellow card) 86'; Boateng (yellow card) 90+4'	Stadium: Pirelli Stadium; Attendance: 855; Referee: Paul Howard
