= Davis Keillor-Dunn =

English footballer (born 1997)

Personal information
- Full name: Davis James Marshall Keillor-Dunn
- Date of birth: 2 November 1997 (age 29)
- Place of birth: Sunderland, England
- Height: 5 ft 11 in (1.80 m)
- Position: Forward

Team information
- Current team: Sheffield Wednesday (on loan from Wrexham)
- Number: 50

Youth career
- Newcastle United
- Gateshead
- Middlesbrough
- 2015–2016: Sunderland
- 2016–2017: Chesterfield
- 2017: Ross County

Senior career*
Years	Team	Apps	(Gls)
2017–2019	Ross County	40	(4)
2019	→ Falkirk (loan)	11	(3)
2020	Wrexham	6	(1)
2020–2022	Oldham Athletic	87	(25)
2022–2023	Burton Albion	19	(5)
2023–2024	Mansfield Town	68	(28)
2024–2026	Barnsley	66	(31)
2026–	Wrexham	7	(0)
2026–	→ Sheffield Wednesday (loan)	11	(4)
- * Club domestic league appearances and goals as of 22:02, 20 November 2026 (UTC)

Davis James Marshall Keillor-Dunn (born 2 November 1997) is an English professional footballer who plays as a forward for EFL League One club Sheffield Wednesday on loan from EFL Championship club Wrexham.

== Career ==
=== Ross County ===
Keillor-Dunn spent his youth career at Middlesbrough, Sunderland and Chesterfield before moving to Ross County on 22 July 2016. Whilst playing for the youth team in the 2016–17 season, he was one of the stand-out performers as they won their first Development League title. He was awarded a first team contract in summer 2017.

On 9 August 2017, he made his senior debut coming on as a substitute against Motherwell in the League Cup. On 9 September 2017, he made his first competitive start in the League against Partick Thistle, impressing in a 1–1 draw. On 14 October 2017, he scored his first goal for the club in the League against Hearts. He signed a new contract on 31 October 2017 after his initial break-through into the first team.

Keillor-Dunn moved on loan to Falkirk in January 2019. His first goal for Falkirk was against Queen of the South, where he was also sent off in the match. He left County by mutual consent in September 2019, after requesting more game time.

=== Wrexham ===
On 16 January 2020, Keillor-Dunn signed for Wrexham until the end of the 2019–20 season.

=== Oldham Athletic ===
On 7 October 2020, Keillor-Dunn signed for EFL League Two side Oldham Athletic on a one-year deal. He scored his first goal for Oldham on 10 November 2020 in an EFL Trophy group game against Bradford City.

After scoring five goals in four consecutive matches as Oldham fought against relegation, Keillor-Dunn was awarded the EFL League Two Player of the Month award for February 2022. Following Oldham's relegation to the National League, Keillor-Dunn was released by the club at the end of the 2021–22 season.

=== Burton Albion ===
On 28 June 2022, League One club Burton Albion announced the agreement of a two-year deal with Keillor-Dunn. He scored six times in 26 appearances for Burton, including a first career hat-trick in a 4–4 draw at Accrington Stanley on 13 August 2022.

=== Mansfield Town ===
Keillor-Dunn moved to League Two side Mansfield Town on 31 January 2023. In the 2023–24 season, he scored 22 goals as Mansfield earned promotion to League One. His performances earned him a place in the EFL League Two Team of the Season.

=== Barnsley ===
On 30 August 2024, Keillor-Dunn joined League One club Barnsley on a three-year deal for an undisclosed fee.

Keillor-Dunn scored 19 goals in his first season at Barnsley and earned the clubs' Player of the Year award for the 2024–2025 season.

=== Return to Wrexham ===
On 2 February 2026, it was announced Keillor-Dunn has signed for Wrexham on a three-and-a-half year deal, returning after nearly 6 years away from North Wales.

On 3 September 2026, it was announced Keillor-Dunn had signed for League One club Sheffield Wednesday on loan until 2 January 2027. He made his debut the following weekend against Peterborough United, starting the game in a 2–1 win. His first goal came in the EFL Trophy against Salford City heading in a cross from debutant Joel Akpobi. He scored a brace against AFC Wimbledon in October, which were his first league goals for the club.

== Career statistics ==
As of 20 November 2026

Appearances and goals by club, season and competition
Club	Season	League			National cup (Note: Includes Scottish Cup, FA Cup)		League cup (Note: Includes Scottish League Cup, EFL Cup)		Other		Total	
Club	Season	Division	Apps	Goals	Apps	Goals	Apps	Goals	Apps	Goals	Apps	Goals
Ross County Under 20s	2016-17	—	0	0	0	0	0	0	1 (Note: Appearances in the Scottish Challenge Cup)	0	1	0
Ross County Under 20s	2019–20	—	0	0	0	0	0	0	2	2	2	2
Ross County Under 20s	Total		0	0	0	0	0	0	3	2	3	2
Ross County	2017–18	Scottish Premiership	29	3	0	0	1	0	–		30	3
Ross County	2018–19	Scottish Championship	11	1	0	0	2	0	3	2	16	3
Ross County	Total		40	4	0	0	3	0	3	2	46	6
Falkirk (loan)	2018–19	Scottish Championship	11	3	0	0	0	0	0	0	11	3
Wrexham	2019–20	National League	6	1	0	0	0	0	0	0	6	1
Oldham Athletic	2020–21	EFL League Two	41	10	2	0	2	0	4 (Note: Appearances in EFL Trophy)	1	49	11
Oldham Athletic	2021–22	EFL League Two	46	15	2	1	3	0	5	1	56	17
Oldham Athletic	Total		87	25	4	1	5	0	9	2	105	28
Burton Albion	2022–23	EFL League One	19	5	3	0	1	0	3	1	26	6
Mansfield Town	2022–23	EFL League Two	19	6	0	0	0	0	0	0	19	6
Mansfield Town	2023–24	EFL League Two	46	22	1	0	4	0	0	0	51	22
Mansfield Town	2024–25	EFL League One	3	0	0	0	1	1	1	0	5	1
Mansfield Town	Total		68	28	1	0	5	1	1	0	75	29
Barnsley	2024–25	EFL League One	42	18	2	1	0	0	0	0	44	19
Barnsley	2025–26	EFL League One	24	13	3	2	3	0	4	1	34	16
Barnsley	Total		66	31	5	3	3	0	4	1	78	35
Wrexham	2025–26	EFL Championship	6	0	1	0	—		—		7	0
Wrexham	2026–27	EFL Championship	1	0	0	0	1	0	0	0	2	0
Wrexham	Total		7	0	1	0	1	0	0	0	9	0
Sheffield Wednesday (loan)	2026–27	EFL League One	11	4	1	1	—		1	1	13	6
Career total			315	101	15	5	18	1	24	9	372	116

== Honours ==
Mansfield Town

- EFL League Two third-place promotion: 2023–24

Individual

- EFL League Two Player of the Month: February 2022
- EFL League Two Team of the Season: 2023–24
- PFA Team of the Year: 2023–24 League Two
- EFL League One Team of the Season: 2024–25
- Barnsley Player of the Season: 2024–25
