= 2023–24 EFL League Two =

EFL League Two
- Season: 2023–24
- Dates: 5 August 2023 – 27 April 2024
- Champions: Stockport County; 1st League Two title 2nd 4th tier title
- Promoted: Stockport County; Wrexham; Mansfield Town; Crawley Town
- Relegated: Sutton United; Forest Green Rovers
- Matches: 552
- Goals: 1,645 (2.98 per match)
- Top goalscorer: Macaulay Langstaff (28 goals)
- Biggest home win: Stockport County 8–0 Sutton United; 16 December 2023
- Biggest away win: Doncaster Rovers 0–5 Morecambe; 16 Dec 2023; Grimsby Town 1–6 Walsall; 1 Jan 2024
- Highest scoring: Mansfield Town 9–2 Harrogate Town; 13 Feb 2024
- Longest winning run: Stockport County (12 games)
- Longest unbeaten run: Mansfield Town (17 games)
- Longest winless run: Forest Green Rovers (15 games)
- Longest losing run: Newport County (8 games)
- Highest attendance: 21,552; Bradford City vs Wrexham (21 Oct 2023)
- Lowest attendance: 1,071; Harrogate Town vs Doncaster Rovers (6 January 2024)
- Total attendance: 3,359,055
- Average attendance: 6,220
- All statistics correct as of 27 April 2024.

The 2023–24 EFL League Two (referred to as the Sky Bet League Two for sponsorship purposes) was the 20th season of EFL League Two under its current title and the 32nd season under its current league division format. The season began on 5 August 2023 and ended on 27 April 2024.

== Team changes ==
The following teams have changed division from the previous season:

=== To League Two ===
Promoted from National League

- Wrexham
- Notts County

Relegated from League One

- Milton Keynes Dons
- Morecambe
- Accrington Stanley
- Forest Green Rovers

=== From League Two ===
Promoted to League One

- Leyton Orient
- Stevenage
- Northampton Town
- Carlisle United

Relegated to National League

- Rochdale
- Hartlepool United

== Stadiums ==
Locations of the 2023–24 EFL League Two teams

Team	Location	Stadium	Capacity
Accrington Stanley	Accrington	Crown Ground	5,450
AFC Wimbledon	London (Wimbledon)	Plough Lane	9,369
Barrow	Barrow-in-Furness	Holker Street	6,500
Bradford City	Bradford	Valley Parade	24,840
Colchester United	Colchester	Colchester Community Stadium	10,105
Crawley Town	Crawley	Broadfield Stadium	5,996
Crewe Alexandra	Crewe	Gresty Road	10,153
Doncaster Rovers	Doncaster	Eco-Power Stadium	15,231
Forest Green Rovers	Nailsworth	The New Lawn	5,147
Gillingham	Gillingham	Priestfield Stadium	11,582
Grimsby Town	Cleethorpes	Blundell Park	9,052
Harrogate Town	Harrogate	Wetherby Road	5,000
Mansfield Town	Mansfield	Field Mill	9,186
Milton Keynes Dons	Milton Keynes	Stadium MK	30,500
Morecambe	Morecambe	Globe Arena	6,476
Newport County	Newport	Rodney Parade	7,850
Notts County	Nottingham	Meadow Lane Stadium	19,841
Salford City	Salford	Moor Lane	5,108
Stockport County	Stockport	Edgeley Park	10,852
Sutton United	London (Sutton)	Gander Green Lane	5,032
Swindon Town	Swindon	County Ground	15,728
Tranmere Rovers	Birkenhead	Prenton Park	16,789
Walsall	Walsall	Bescot Stadium	11,300
Wrexham	Wrexham	Racecourse Ground	12,600

== Personnel and sponsoring ==
Team	Manager	Captain	Kit manufacturer	Sponsor
Accrington Stanley	(England) John Doolan	(Republic of Ireland) Séamus Conneely	(Italy) Macron	Wham
AFC Wimbledon	(England) Johnnie Jackson	(England) Jake Reeves	(England) Umbro	Sports Interactive
Barrow	(England) Pete Wild	(Republic of Ireland) Niall Canavan	(Germany) Puma	Terrace
Bradford City	(Scotland) Graham Alexander	(England) Richie Smallwood	(Italy) Macron	JCT600
Colchester United	(England) Danny Cowley	(England) Connor Hall	(Italy) Macron	Workhorse Group
Crawley Town	(England) Scott Lindsey	(England) Ben Gladwin	(Germany) Adidas	The People's Pension
Crewe Alexandra	(England) Lee Bell	(England) Luke Offord	(Thailand) FBT	Mornflake
Doncaster Rovers	(Northern Ireland) Grant McCann	(England) Richard Wood	(England) Oxen	Eco-Power Group
Forest Green Rovers	(England) Steve Cotterill	(Republic of Ireland) Dom Bernard	(England) Umbro	Ecotricity
Gillingham		(Republic of Ireland) Shaun Williams	(Italy) Macron	Bauvill
Grimsby Town	(Gibraltar) David Artell	(England) Danny Rose	(Italy) Macron	myenergi
Harrogate Town	(England) Simon Weaver	(England) Josh Falkingham	(United States) New Balance	Strata
Mansfield Town	(England) Nigel Clough	(England) Aden Flint	(England) Castore	One Call Insurance
Milton Keynes Dons	(England) Mike Williamson	(England) Dean Lewington	(England) Castore	Suzuki
Morecambe	(England) Ged Brannan	(Scotland) Donald Love	(Spain) Joma	Omnia
Newport County	(Republic of Ireland) Graham Coughlan	(Republic of Ireland) Ryan Delaney	(England) VX3 Sportswear	Pure Vans
Notts County	(England) Stuart Maynard	(Scotland) Kyle Cameron	(Germany) Puma	John Pye Auctions (Home) / Jake Bugg (Away)
Salford City	(England) Karl Robinson	(Scotland) Elliott Watt	(Germany) Adidas	Salboy
Stockport County	(England) Dave Challinor	(Republic of Ireland) Paddy Madden	(Germany) Puma	VITA Group
Sutton United	(Wales) Steve Morison	(England) Craig Eastmond	(Republic of Ireland) O'Neills	Echo Laser
Swindon Town	(Republic of Ireland) Gavin Gunning	(England) Charlie Austin	(Germany) Puma	MiPermit
Tranmere Rovers	(England) Nigel Adkins	(England) Connor Jennings	(Indonesia) Mills	Essar
Walsall	(England) Mat Sadler	(Montserrat) Donervon Daniels	(Italy) Erreà	Poundland
Wrexham	(England) Phil Parkinson	(England) Luke Young	(Italy) Macron	United Airlines

== Managerial changes ==
Team	Outgoing manager	Manner of departure	Date of vacancy	Position in the table	Incoming manager	Date of appointment
Swindon Town	(England) Steve Mildenhall (Republic of Ireland) Gavin Gunning	End of interim spell	8 May 2023	Pre-season	(Wales) Michael Flynn	8 May 2023
Doncaster Rovers	(England) Danny Schofield	Sacked	9 May 2023	Pre-season	(Northern Ireland) Grant McCann	12 May 2023
Milton Keynes Dons	(England) Mark Jackson	Sacked	9 May 2023	Pre-season	(Scotland) Graham Alexander	27 May 2023
Forest Green Rovers	(Scotland) Duncan Ferguson	Sacked	4 July 2023	Pre-season	(England) David Horseman	17 July 2023
Tranmere Rovers	(England) Ian Dawes	Sacked	10 September 2023	22nd	(England) Nigel Adkins (Note: Adkins was initially appointed interim manager before being permanently appointed on 2 November 2023)	10 September 2023
Bradford City	(Wales) Mark Hughes	Sacked	4 October 2023	18th	(Scotland) Graham Alexander	6 November 2023
Gillingham	(England) Neil Harris	Sacked	5 October 2023	8th	(England) Stephen Clemence	1 November 2023
Milton Keynes Dons	(Scotland) Graham Alexander	Sacked	16 October 2023	16th	(England) Mike Williamson	17 October 2023
Colchester United	(England) Ben Garner	Sacked	21 October 2023	22nd	(England) Matthew Etherington (Note: Etherington was originally given the job on an interim basis before being permanently appointed on 16 November 2023)	21 October 2023
Grimsby Town	(England) Paul Hurst	Sacked	28 October 2023	21st	(Gibraltar) David Artell	27 November 2023
Morecambe	(Scotland) Derek Adams	Release clause met	20 November 2023	9th	(England) Ged Brannan	27 November 2023
Sutton United	(England) Matt Gray	Sacked	19 December 2023	24th	(Wales) Steve Morison	6 January 2024
Forest Green Rovers	(England) David Horseman	Mutual consent	20 December 2023	23rd	(England) Troy Deeney	20 December 2023
Salford City	(England) Neil Wood	Sacked	27 December 2023	21st	(England) Karl Robinson	5 January 2024
Colchester United	(England) Matthew Etherington	Sacked	1 January 2024	22nd	(England) Danny Cowley	4 January 2024
Notts County	(England) Luke Williams	Signed by Swansea City	5 January 2024	5th	(England) Stuart Maynard	18 January 2024
Swindon Town	(Wales) Michael Flynn	Mutual consent	15 January 2024	15th	(Republic of Ireland) Gavin Gunning	15 January 2024
Forest Green Rovers	(England) Troy Deeney	Sacked	18 January 2024	24th	(England) Steve Cotterill	25 January 2024
Accrington Stanley	(England) John Coleman	Sacked	3 March 2024	16th	(England) John Doolan (Note: Having been given the job on an interim basis, Doolan was appointed permanently on 22 March 2024)	4 March 2024
Gillingham	(England) Stephen Clemence	Sacked	29 April 2024	12th	(England) Mark Bonner	7 May 2024
Morecambe	(England) Ged Brannan	Resigned	30 April 2024	15th		

== League table ==
Pos	Team	Pld	W	D	L	GF	GA	GD	Pts	Promotion, qualification or relegation
1	Stockport County (C, P)	46	27	11	8	96	48	+48	92	Promoted to EFL League One
2	Wrexham (P)	46	26	10	10	89	52	+37	88	Promoted to EFL League One
3	Mansfield Town (P)	46	24	14	8	90	47	+43	86	Promoted to EFL League One
4	Milton Keynes Dons	46	23	9	14	83	68	+15	78	Qualified for League Two play-offs
5	Doncaster Rovers	46	21	8	17	73	68	+5	71	Qualified for League Two play-offs
6	Crewe Alexandra	46	19	14	13	69	65	+4	71	Qualified for League Two play-offs
7	Crawley Town (O, P)	46	21	7	18	73	67	+6	70	Qualified for League Two play-offs
8	Barrow	46	18	15	13	62	56	+6	69	
9	Bradford City	46	19	12	15	61	59	+2	69	
10	AFC Wimbledon	46	17	14	15	64	51	+13	65	
11	Walsall	46	18	11	17	69	73	−4	65	
12	Gillingham	46	18	10	18	46	57	−11	64	
13	Harrogate Town	46	17	12	17	60	69	−9	63	
14	Notts County	46	18	7	21	89	86	+3	61	
15	Morecambe	46	17	10	19	67	81	−14	58 (Note: On 11 April 2024, Morecambe were deducted three points for failing to pay players and staff on time following previous EFL rules breaches in the 2023–24 season.)	
16	Tranmere Rovers	46	17	6	23	67	70	−3	57	
17	Accrington Stanley	46	16	9	21	63	71	−8	57	
18	Newport County	46	16	7	23	62	76	−14	55	
19	Swindon Town	46	14	12	20	77	83	−6	54	
20	Salford City	46	13	12	21	66	82	−16	51	
21	Grimsby Town	46	11	16	19	57	74	−17	49	
22	Colchester United	46	11	12	23	59	80	−21	45	
23	Sutton United (R)	46	9	15	22	59	84	−25	42	Relegated to National League
24	Forest Green Rovers (R)	46	11	9	26	44	78	−34	42	Relegated to National League

Source: EFL Official Website
Rules for classification: 1) Points; 2) Goal difference; 3) Number of goals scored; 4) Head-to-head results; 5) Wins; 6) Away goals; 7) Penalty points (sec 9.5); 8) 12-point sending off offences
(C) Champions; (O) Play-off winners; (P) Promoted; (R) Relegated

== Play-offs ==
Semi-finals
7	Crawley Town	3	5	8
4	Milton Keynes Dons	0	1	1
6	Crewe Alexandra	0	2	2 (4)
5	Doncaster Rovers	2	0	2 (3)

Final
7	Crawley Town	2
6	Crewe Alexandra	0

First leg

6 May 2024	Crewe Alexandra	0–2	Doncaster Rovers	Crewe
17:30 BST	Demetriou (yellow card) 43'	Report	Molyneux 34'; Biggins 48'	Stadium: Gresty Road; Attendance: 8,220; Referee: Sunny Singh Gill

7 May 2024	Crawley Town	3–0	Milton Keynes Dons	Crawley
19:30 BST	Kelly 5'; Williams 45+1'; Maguire (yellow card) 51'; Darcy 65'; Conroy (yellow card) 66'; Gordon (yellow card) 90+3'	Report	Tomlinson (yellow card) 41'; Bate (yellow card) 45'; Harvie (yellow card) 57'	Stadium: Broadfield Stadium; Attendance: 5,564; Referee: Ross Joyce

Second leg

10 May 2024	Doncaster Rovers	0–2 (a.e.t.) (2–2 agg.) (3–4 p)	Crewe Alexandra	Doncaster
20:00 BST	Lo-Tutala (yellow card) 122'	Report	Demetriou 6' (Tabiner); Maxwell 16' (o.g.); Nevitt (yellow card) 23'; Rowe (yellow card) 39'; Austerfield (yellow card) 120'	Stadium: Eco-Power Stadium; Attendance: 12,889; Referee: Scott Oldham
	Penalties
	Ironside (penalty scored); Westbrooke (penalty missed); Miller (penalty scored); Bailey (penalty scored); Adelakun (penalty missed)		(penalty scored) Baker-Richardson; (penalty missed) Demetriou; (penalty scored) Cooney; (penalty scored) Leigh; (penalty scored) Kirk

11 May 2024	Milton Keynes Dons	1–5 (1–8 agg.)	Crawley Town	Milton Keynes
19:45 BST	Dean 45+1' (Tucker) (penalty missed) 67' (yellow card) 90+5'; Tucker (yellow card) 63'; Williams (yellow card) 83'	Report	Williams 3' (yellow card) 61'; Orsi 30' 90+2' (Darcy); Lolos (yellow card) 40'; Roles 80'	Stadium: Stadium MK; Attendance: 10,053; Referee: Seb Stockridge

=== Final ===
19 May 2024
13:00 BST

Crawley Town	2–0	Crewe Alexandra
Orsi 41'; L. Kelly 85'	Report

Wembley Stadium, London
Attendance: 33,341
Referee: Ben Toner (Lancashire)

== Results ==
Home \ Away	ACC	WIM	BAR	BRA	COL	CRA	CRE	DON	FOR	GIL	GRI	HAR	MAN	MIL	MOR	NEW	NCO	SAL	STO	SUT	SWI	TRA	WAL	WRE
Accrington Stanley	—	2–0	1–1	0–3	0–1	0–1	0–0	0–0	2–1	1–2	0–0	2–1	0–3	1–0	1–2	3–0	2–2	3–0	1–3	4–1	3–4	4–1	2–1	2–0
AFC Wimbledon	2–4	—	2–0	0–1	5–3	0–1	2–2	2–0	1–1	2–0	0–0	1–1	2–1	1–0	1–1	0–2	4–2	1–0	1–2	0–1	4–0	4–1	5–1	1–1
Barrow	1–1	0–0	—	1–2	2–0	1–0	1–3	3–2	1–2	2–0	3–1	0–0	1–1	1–0	1–0	1–0	1–1	0–0	2–2	2–1	0–2	1–0	2–0	1–1
Bradford City	1–0	0–0	1–2	—	2–1	2–4	1–0	1–1	0–2	1–0	1–1	1–1	1–5	4–0	2–2	4–1	0–3	1–1	0–0	1–0	1–0	2–0	1–3	1–1
Colchester United	1–1	0–2	1–4	1–1	—	1–2	1–1	1–4	3–3	0–1	2–0	1–2	1–1	2–3	1–3	2–1	5–4	2–1	1–2	1–1	3–1	2–0	1–1	1–2
Crawley Town	3–1	1–2	1–1	1–0	2–3	—	2–4	0–2	2–0	0–1	2–0	2–1	1–3	2–1	1–2	4–1	2–1	0–1	1–1	3–0	3–1	3–2	1–1	0–1
Crewe Alexandra	3–3	1–1	1–3	1–0	2–1	1–0	—	3–2	0–3	2–0	0–3	0–0	2–2	3–1	2–3	4–2	1–0	2–3	0–2	1–0	2–1	2–0	2–2	0–3
Doncaster Rovers	4–0	1–0	4–2	1–3	3–1	2–0	2–0	—	2–0	2–1	1–0	0–1	2–2	3–0	0–5	0–1	1–3	0–3	1–5	4–1	0–0	2–1	2–1	1–0
Forest Green Rovers	0–1	1–1	0–2	0–3	5–0	2–1	1–4	1–2	—	0–0	2–2	0–2	0–4	0–2	1–2	0–3	1–0	0–2	0–3	0–1	1–2	1–0	2–0	1–1
Gillingham	1–0	1–0	3–0	0–2	0–3	0–2	0–0	2–2	1–1	—	1–1	1–0	1–1	2–1	2–1	0–2	1–2	3–1	0–0	1–0	2–2	1–1	1–1	1–0
Grimsby Town	0–2	0–0	2–1	1–1	2–3	2–3	2–1	1–5	1–0	2–0	—	1–2	1–1	1–0	3–2	1–0	5–5	2–0	1–3	1–1	2–0	1–2	1–6	1–3
Harrogate Town	2–1	0–1	0–1	3–0	1–0	1–2	0–1	3–1	0–1	5–1	1–0	—	1–4	3–5	2–0	1–4	3–1	3–2	1–3	2–2	1–1	0–2	0–2	2–2
Mansfield Town	2–1	0–0	1–0	0–0	1–1	1–4	0–1	1–1	1–0	2–1	2–0	9–2	—	1–2	3–0	2–0	1–0	5–1	3–2	1–1	3–2	2–2	2–1	0–0
Milton Keynes Dons	2–1	3–1	2–2	4–1	1–0	2–0	3–1	2–1	2–0	2–1	1–1	0–1	1–4	—	1–2	3–0	1–1	3–1	1–2	4–4	3–2	1–0	5–0	1–1
Morecambe	1–1	4–1	2–1	3–0	0–1	1–0	0–1	0–3	1–2	2–3	1–1	2–2	1–1	1–3	—	1–2	0–0	1–0	1–1	1–0	2–2	1–0	2–1	1–3
Newport County	1–3	2–2	1–1	1–4	2–1	0–4	1–1	4–0	4–2	1–0	1–1	1–2	0–1	0–0	5–3	—	1–3	0–1	2–1	3–1	2–1	1–2	3–3	1–0
Notts County	3–1	0–2	1–1	4–2	1–0	3–1	1–3	3–0	4–3	1–3	3–2	3–0	1–4	3–3	5–0	3–0	—	1–2	2–5	3–4	3–1	2–1	1–2	0–2
Salford City	1–2	0–0	5–3	1–2	1–1	1–1	4–2	2–2	2–2	0–2	0–3	2–2	1–2	2–4	3–1	2–1	0–2	—	2–2	1–2	2–2	1–5	1–2	3–1
Stockport County	4–2	1–0	1–0	1–1	2–0	3–3	1–3	1–0	2–0	0–1	3–2	1–1	0–2	5–0	2–0	1–0	2–1	0–0	—	8–0	0–0	2–0	3–1	5–0
Sutton United	3–1	0–3	2–2	2–1	1–1	2–2	1–1	1–1	0–1	0–1	1–1	1–2	0–2	1–1	2–3	1–1	5–1	0–2	1–3	—	3–1	1–1	4–0	1–2
Swindon Town	1–2	3–2	0–3	2–0	2–2	6–0	2–2	1–2	2–1	0–1	2–1	1–1	2–1	1–2	3–3	2–0	2–1	1–1	2–4	5–3	—	3–1	2–0	0–1
Tranmere Rovers	2–0	3–2	1–2	2–1	1–1	1–3	0–0	1–2	3–0	3–1	2–2	3–0	2–1	1–2	2–3	2–1	4–2	3–4	4–0	1–0	2–1	—	1–3	0–1
Walsall	2–1	1–3	1–1	2–3	1–0	1–1	2–0	3–1	0–0	4–1	1–1	0–1	2–1	0–0	3–0	0–3	1–3	2–1	2–1	1–1	2–1	1–0	—	3–1
Wrexham	4–0	2–0	4–1	0–1	2–1	4–1	3–3	2–1	6–0	2–0	3–0	0–0	2–0	3–5	6–0	2–0	1–0	3–2	2–1	2–1	5–5	0–1	4–2	—

Source: BBC Sport
Legend: Blue = home team win; Yellow = draw; Red = away team win.
For upcoming matches, an "a" indicates there is an article about the rivalry between the two participants.

== Results by round ==
Team ╲ Round	1	2	3	4	5	6	7	8	9	10	11	12	13	14	15	16	17	18	19	20	21	22	23	24	25	26	27	28	29	30	31	32	33	34	35	36	37	38	39	40	41	42	43	44	45	46
Accrington Stanley	W	L	D	W	W	L	L	W	L	L	D	W	W	W	W	L	L	W	L	L	D	D	W	L	D	W	W	L	L	W	D	L	W	D	L	L	L	W	D	L	L	L	D	L	L	W
AFC Wimbledon	D	D	W	W	D	D	L	D	W	W	W	D	L	D	L	L	W	L	W	L	W	D	W	L	W	D	D	L	L	W	D	W	L	D	L	W	W	W	L	D	D	L	W	L	L	W
Barrow	W	W	D	L	D	W	W	D	L	W	L	D	D	D	W	D	W	W	W	W	W	W	W	D	D	L	W	D	L	D	W	L	L	L	L	D	W	D	D	W	W	L	L	L	L	D
Bradford City	L	W	D	L	W	D	D	D	W	L	L	W	W	D	L	L	L	L	W	W	D	W	W	D	D	L	L	D	D	L	D	W	W	W	W	L	W	L	L	L	W	D	W	W	W	W
Colchester United	W	L	L	L	W	L	W	D	L	W	L	L	L	L	W	W	D	L	L	L	L	L	W	L	L	L	D	D	D	W	D	L	W	D	D	L	L	L	D	D	W	D	L	W	L	D
Crawley Town	W	D	W	L	L	D	W	W	W	W	L	L	L	L	D	L	W	L	W	L	W	L	L	W	L	W	W	L	W	L	L	L	D	W	W	D	W	W	D	W	L	W	W	L	D	W
Crewe Alexandra	D	D	W	D	L	W	W	D	W	D	W	L	W	W	L	W	W	W	W	D	L	D	L	L	D	W	W	W	W	L	D	W	W	D	W	L	L	W	L	D	D	L	D	L	L	D
Doncaster Rovers	L	L	D	L	L	D	L	W	W	L	W	L	W	W	L	W	L	W	L	W	D	L	L	L	D	W	L	L	D	L	D	W	D	W	W	L	W	W	W	W	W	W	W	W	W	D
Forest Green Rovers	L	W	L	L	D	W	L	L	L	L	L	L	W	L	L	W	L	D	D	L	D	L	D	L	L	D	D	L	D	L	D	L	W	L	W	L	W	W	L	L	L	W	L	L	W	W
Gillingham	W	W	W	W	L	L	W	W	L	D	L	W	L	L	W	L	L	W	L	W	L	L	D	L	W	W	D	W	D	L	D	W	D	L	W	W	D	L	D	W	D	L	L	W	L	D
Grimsby Town	D	L	W	D	D	W	D	L	L	L	W	D	L	L	L	L	W	D	D	D	W	D	L	L	W	L	D	D	L	L	D	L	L	L	D	W	D	W	D	L	L	D	W	W	W	L
Harrogate Town	W	L	L	L	W	L	L	D	W	W	L	W	L	W	L	L	W	D	L	D	W	W	W	W	L	D	W	W	W	L	D	W	L	D	L	D	L	D	D	W	D	W	L	D	L	D
Mansfield Town	D	W	D	D	W	D	W	D	W	D	D	D	W	W	W	W	W	W	L	D	L	W	W	W	D	W	L	D	D	L	W	W	W	L	W	W	W	L	W	D	L	W	L	W	W	D
Milton Keynes Dons	W	W	L	W	W	L	D	L	D	L	D	L	D	L	W	W	D	W	W	D	W	W	W	W	W	L	D	W	L	W	L	W	L	W	W	L	W	L	W	L	W	D	W	L	W	D
Morecambe	W	L	D	W	L	W	L	L	D	W	D	W	W	W	W	W	L	L	L	L	D	W	L	D	L	D	L	D	W	L	W	W	W	D	D	W	L	L	L	L	W	W	L	L	L	D
Newport County	L	W	L	W	W	D	L	D	L	L	W	L	L	D	L	W	D	L	W	W	L	D	L	W	D	D	L	W	W	W	W	W	L	W	L	L	L	W	W	L	L	L	L	L	L	L
Notts County	L	W	D	W	W	W	D	W	W	L	W	D	L	W	W	L	L	W	L	W	L	L	L	W	W	L	L	D	L	D	L	L	W	L	L	W	L	L	D	L	L	D	W	W	W	L
Salford City	W	D	L	W	L	L	L	L	L	W	W	W	L	D	W	D	L	L	L	D	D	D	L	L	L	L	D	W	D	W	W	D	D	W	L	L	L	D	W	W	L	L	L	L	W	D
Stockport County	L	L	D	W	L	D	W	W	W	W	W	W	W	W	W	W	W	W	L	D	D	W	W	D	D	L	D	W	W	W	D	W	L	L	D	W	W	D	D	W	W	W	W	W	W	L
Sutton United	W	L	L	L	L	L	L	L	D	L	L	W	L	L	L	W	D	D	D	D	L	L	L	W	L	D	W	D	D	D	D	L	L	L	D	L	D	L	W	W	W	W	L	D	D	D
Swindon Town	L	D	W	D	W	D	W	W	D	W	L	L	W	D	L	L	L	D	W	W	L	L	L	L	W	L	D	L	W	W	L	D	D	L	D	D	L	L	L	L	W	L	W	W	L	D
Tranmere Rovers	L	L	W	L	L	L	L	L	W	L	W	D	L	L	L	L	W	D	W	D	W	L	W	W	W	W	L	L	L	W	D	L	L	W	L	W	D	W	W	L	L	D	L	W	W	L
Walsall	L	W	L	D	D	W	W	L	L	W	D	L	W	D	D	L	L	L	D	L	W	W	L	W	W	W	W	L	W	D	D	L	D	W	W	W	L	D	D	W	L	W	W	L	L	L
Wrexham	L	D	W	D	D	W	W	W	L	D	D	W	W	D	W	W	W	L	W	D	D	W	W	W	L	W	D	W	L	W	L	L	W	W	L	W	W	D	L	W	L	W	W	W	W	W

Source: efl.com
W = Win; D = Draw; L = Lose

== Season statistics ==
As of 20 April 2024

=== Top scorers ===
Rank	Player	Club	Goals
1	(England) Macaulay Langstaff	Notts County	28
2	(England) Paul Mullin	Wrexham	24
2	(England) Matt Smith	Salford City	24
4	(England) Davis Keillor-Dunn	Mansfield Town	22
5	(Wales) Will Evans	Newport County	21
6	(England) Isaac Olaofe	Stockport County	20
7	(England) Joe Ironside	Doncaster Rovers	18
7	(England) Danilo Orsi	Crawley Town	18
9	(England) Dan Kemp	Swindon Town; MK Dons	17
9	(Republic of Ireland) Paddy Madden	Stockport County	17

Updated to match(es) played on 20 April. Source: BBC

=== Hat-tricks ===
Player	For	Against	Result	Date	Ref
(Scotland) Callum Hendry	Salford City	Tranmere Rovers	3–4 (A)	19 August 2023	
(England) Jake Young^{4}	Swindon Town	Crawley Town	6–0 (H)	26 August 2023	
(England) Andy Cook	Bradford City	Newport County	4–1 (A)	23 September 2023	
(England) Troy Deeney	Forest Green Rovers	Notts County	3–4 (A)	23 September 2023	
(England) Isaac Olaofe	Stockport County	Wrexham	5–0 (H)	23 September 2023	
(Iraq) Ali Al-Hamadi	AFC Wimbledon	Tranmere Rovers	4–1 (H)	30 September 2023	
(Northern Ireland) JJ McKiernan	Morecambe	Colchester United	1–3 (A)	7 October 2023	
(England) Isaac Hutchinson	Walsall	Gillingham	4–1 (H)	14 October 2023	
(England) Freddie Draper	Walsall	Newport County	3–3 (A)	20 October 2023	
(England) Matt Smith	Salford City	Doncaster Rovers	0–3 (A)	24 October 2023	
(Wales) Paul Mullin	Wrexham	Morecambe	6–0 (H)	25 November 2023	
(Republic of Ireland) Paddy Madden	Stockport County	Sutton United	8–0 (H)	16 December 2023	
(England) Macaulay Langstaff	Notts County	Morecambe	5–0 (H)	29 December 2023	
(Scotland) Steven Fletcher	Wrexham	Barrow	4–1 (H)	1 January 2024	
(England) Matt Smith	Salford City	Crewe Alexandra	2–3 (A)	27 January 2024	
(England) Hiram Boateng	Mansfield Town	Harrogate Town	9–2 (H)	13 February 2024	
(Wales) Paul Mullin	Wrexham	Accrington Stanley	4–0 (H)	2 March 2024	
(Republic of Ireland) Paddy Madden	Stockport County	Sutton United	1–3 (A)	6 April 2024	
(Republic of Ireland) Paddy Madden	Stockport County	Notts County	2–5 (A)	16 April 2024	
(Lebanon) Omar Bugiel	AFC Wimbledon	Walsall	5–1 (H)	27 April 2024	
(England) Danilo Orsi	Crawley Town	MK Dons	5–1 (A)	11 May 2024	

== Awards ==
=== Monthly ===
Month	Manager of the Month		Player of the Month		Reference
August	(Scotland) Graham Alexander	Milton Keynes Dons	(England) Jake Young	Swindon Town	
September	(England) Dave Challinor	Stockport County	(England) Louie Barry	Stockport County	
October	(England) Dave Challinor	Stockport County	(England) Matt Smith	Salford City	
November	(England) Pete Wild	Barrow	(England) Jake Young	Swindon Town	
December	(England) Mike Williamson	Milton Keynes Dons	(England) Dean Lewington	Milton Keynes Dons	
January	(England) Simon Weaver	Harrogate Town	(Malta) Jodi Jones	Notts County	
February	(England) Nigel Clough	Mansfield Town	(England) Hakeeb Adelakun	Doncaster Rovers	
March	(England) Pete Wild	Barrow	(Wales) Paul Mullin	Wrexham	
April	(Northern Ireland) Grant McCann	Doncaster Rovers	(Republic of Ireland) Paddy Madden	Stockport County	

=== Annual ===
Award	Winner	Club
Player of the Season	(Malta) Jodi Jones	Notts County
Young Player of the Season	(Scotland) Rob Apter	Tranmere Rovers
Manager of the Season	(England) Nigel Clough	Mansfield Town

== Attendances ==
Bradford City drew the highest average home attendance in the 2023-24 edition of the EFL League Two.

#	Football club	Home games	Average attendance
1	Bradford City	23	17,439
2	Wrexham AFC	23	11,210
3	Notts County	23	10,905
4	Stockport County	23	9,331
5	Swindon Town	23	8,483
6	AFC Wimbledon	23	7,891
7	Mansfield Town	23	7,427
8	Doncaster Rovers	23	7,090
9	MK Dons	23	6,855
10	Grimsby Town	23	6,281
11	Tranmere Rovers	23	6,263
12	Gillingham FC	23	6,226
13	Walsall FC	23	5,618
14	Crewe Alexandra	23	5,090
15	Newport County	23	4,336
16	Colchester United	23	4,177
17	Morecambe FC	23	4,002
18	Barrow AFC	23	3,804
19	Crawley Town	23	3,571
20	Sutton United	23	3,286
21	Salford City	23	2,989
22	Accrington Stanley	23	2,967
23	Harrogate Town	23	2,747
24	Forest Green Rovers	23	2,413
