= 2026–27 Mansfield Town F.C. season =

130th season in existence of Mansfield Town FC

Mansfield Town
2026–27 season
- Owner: John Radford
- Chief Executive: Carolyn Radford
- Manager: Nigel Clough
- Stadium: Field Mill

The 2026–27 season is the 130th season in the history of Mansfield Town Football Club and their third consecutive season League One, the third-tier of English football. In addition to the domestic league, the club will also participate in the FA Cup, the EFL Cup, and the EFL Trophy.

== Transfers and contracts ==
=== In ===
| Date | Pos. | Player | From | Fee | Ref. |
|---|---|---|---|---|---|
| 1 July 2026 (Note: The transfer was announced on 16 June, and would become official once McGoldrick's contract at Barnsley had expired.) | CF | (Republic of Ireland) David McGoldrick | (England) Barnsley | Free | |
| 1 July 2026 (Note: The transfer was announced on 20 May, and would become official once Russell's contract at Barnsley had expired.) | CM | (Jamaica) Jon Russell | (England) Barnsley | Free | |
| 13 July 2026 | CF | (England) Michael Smith | (England) Preston North End | Free transfer | |
| 5 August 2026 | CM | (England) Liam Thompson | (England) Derby County | Undisclosed | |

=== Loaned in ===
| Date | Pos. | Player | From | Loaned until | Ref. |
|---|---|---|---|---|---|
| 11 August 2026 | LB | (England) Owen Dodgson | (England) Stockport County | End of Season | |
| 1 September 2026 | CDM | (England) George Abbott | (England) Tottenham Hotspur | End of Season | |

=== Loaned out ===
| Date | Pos. | Player | To | Loaned until | Ref. |
|---|---|---|---|---|---|
| 8 August 2026 | GK | (Republic of Ireland) Owen Mason | (England) Gillingham | 15 August 2026 | |
| 10 August 2026 | CDM | (England) Finn Flanagan | (Northern Ireland) Portadown | End of Season | |
| 11 September 2026 | GK | (Dominican Republic) Anthony Núñez | (England) Chasetown | 10 October 2026 | |
| 28 September 2026 | CM | (England) Jayden Chambers-Morgan | (England) Long Eaton United | 28 October 2026 | |
| 3 October 2026 | RB | (England) Elliot Hartmann | (England) Anstey Nomads | 3 November 2026 | |

=== Out ===
| Date | Pos. | Player | To | Fee | Ref. |
|---|---|---|---|---|---|
| 7 August 2026 | CF | (Wales) Will Evans | (England) Plymouth Argyle | £400,000 | |
| 14 August 2026 | GK | (Republic of Ireland) Owen Mason | (England) Bromley | Undisclosed | |

=== Released / Out of Contract ===
| Date | Pos. | Player | Subsequent club | Joined date | Ref. |
|---|---|---|---|---|---|
| 30 June 2026 | CB | (England) George Cooper | (England) Buxton | 1 July 2026 | |
| 30 June 2026 | LB | (England) Darien Wauchope | (England) Anstey Nomads | 1 July 2026 | |
| 30 June 2026 | CF | (Nigeria) Victor Adeboyejo | (England) Bromley | 13 July 2026 | |
| 30 June 2026 | CF | (England) Max Dickov | (England) Eastleigh | 13 July 2026 | |
| 30 June 2026 | CF | (Pakistan) McKeal Abdullah | (England) Ilkeston Town | 3 August 2026 | |
| 30 June 2026 | CM | (Wales) Aaron Lewis | (Wales) Newport County | 25 September 2026 | |
| 30 June 2026 | LB | (England) Louis Bonser | | | |
| 30 June 2026 | CF | (United States) Dom Dwyer | | | |
| 30 June 2026 | CDM | (Cyprus) Ronnie Kokkinos | | | |
| 30 June 2026 | CAM | (Poland) Jakub Kruszynski | | | |
| 30 June 2026 | CF | (England) Dan Organ | | | |

=== New Contract ===
| Date | Pos. | Player | Contract until | Ref. |
|---|---|---|---|---|
| 5 May 2026 | CF | (Wales) Will Evans | 30 June 2027 | |
| 5 May 2026 | GK | (Republic of Ireland) Owen Mason | 30 June 2027 | |
| 11 May 2026 | CDM | (England) Charlie Carter | 30 June 2027 | |
| 11 May 2026 | CDM | (England) Finn Flanagan | 30 June 2027 | |
| 11 May 2026 | CF | (England) Jack Goodman | 30 June 2027 | |
| 11 May 2026 | RB | (England) Elliot Hartmann | 30 June 2027 | |
| 11 May 2026 | CM | (England) Cormac Maher | 30 June 2027 | |
| 11 May 2026 | CM | (England) Ollie Taylor | 30 June 2027 | |
| 12 May 2026 | SS | (Wales) Tyler Roberts | 30 June 2027 | |
| 19 May 2026 | CF | (England) Lucas Akins | 30 June 2027 | |
| 19 May 2026 | CB | (Saint Kitts and Nevis) Jordan Bowery | 30 June 2027 | |
| 19 May 2026 | RB | (Wales) Elliott Hewitt | 30 June 2027 | |
| 19 May 2026 | CAM | (England) George Maris | 30 June 2027 | |
| 19 May 2026 | LB | (Republic of Ireland) Stephen McLaughlin | 30 June 2027 | |
| 1 July 2026 (Note: Contract agreements were announced on 11 May, and come into effect on July 1.) | CM | (England) Jayden Chambers-Morgan | Undisclosed (Note: First professional contract) | |
| 1 July 2026 | GK | (England) Frankie Shepherd | Undisclosed | |
| 1 July 2026 | CB | (England) Jacob Stubbs | Undisclosed | |
| 14 August 2026 | GK | (England) Liam Roberts | 30 June 2028 | |
| 17 August 2026 | CM | (England) Ollie Taylor | 30 June 2028 | |

== Pre-season and friendlies ==
On 8 June, Stags four pre-season friendlies against Retford United, Barrow, Alfreton Town and Derby County along with training camp at St Andrews in Scotland.

Win Draw Loss Fixtures

| 14 July 2026 Friendly | Retford United | 1–2 | Mansfield Town | Retford |
| 19:00 BST | Chambers 19' | Report | Oshilaja 36'; Roberts 45' (pen.) | Stadium: Cannon Park |

| 18 July 2026 Friendly | Barrow | 4–3 | Mansfield Town | Barrow-in-Furness |
| 15:00 BST | Reid 49'; Whitfield 54'; Walker 72'; Smith 90' | Report | Smith 26'; Hendry 39'; Evans 80' | Stadium: Holker Street |

| 28 July 2026 Friendly | Alfreton Town | 0–4 | Mansfield Town | Alfreton |
| 19:30 BST | | Report | Oates 30', 36'; Maris 56'; McLaughlin 59' | Stadium: Solana Stadium |

| 31 July 2026 Friendly | Mansfield Town | 1–3 | Derby County | Mansfield |
| 19:00 BST | Smith 31' | Report | Brown 22'; Smith 57'; Allen 70' | Stadium: One Call Stadium; Attendance: 5,363 (1,336 away); Referee: Declan Bourne |

== Competitions ==
=== League One ===
==== League table ====
| Pos | Team | Pld | W | D | L | GF | GA | GD | Pts |
|---|---|---|---|---|---|---|---|---|---|
| 11 | Cambridge United | 15 | 5 | 6 | 4 | 21 | 24 | −3 | 21 |
| 12 | Leyton Orient | 14 | 6 | 2 | 6 | 23 | 15 | +8 | 20 |
| 13 | Mansfield Town | 14 | 5 | 5 | 4 | 21 | 19 | +2 | 20 |
| 14 | Stevenage | 13 | 5 | 4 | 4 | 18 | 13 | +5 | 19 |
| 15 | Wycombe Wanderers | 14 | 4 | 6 | 4 | 24 | 27 | −3 | 18 |

Updated to match(es) played on 21 November 2026. Source: EFL Official Website
Rules for classification: 1) Points; 2) Goal difference; 3) Number of goals scored; 4) Head-to-head results; 5) Wins; 6) Away goals; 7) Penalty points (sec 9.5); 8) 12-point sending off offences

==== Results summary ====
| Overall | | | | | | | | Home | | | | | | Away | | | | | |
| Pld | W | D | L | GF | GA | GD | Pts | W | D | L | GF | GA | GD | W | D | L | GF | GA | GD |
|---|---|---|---|---|---|---|---|---|---|---|---|---|---|---|---|---|---|---|---|
| 13 | 5 | 4 | 4 | 20 | 18 | +2 | 19 | 3 | 2 | 1 | 10 | 7 | +3 | 2 | 2 | 3 | 10 | 11 | −1 |

Last updated: 3 November 2026.
Source: Soccerway

==== Matches ====
On 25 June, the League One fixtures were revealed.

Win Draw Loss Fixtures

| 15 August 2026 1 | Mansfied Town | 2–1 | Doncaster Rovers | Mansfield |
| 15:00 BST | Oates 26'; Reed 74'; Blake-Tracy (yellow card) 82'; Thompson (yellow card) 86' | Report | Senior 49'; Grehan (yellow card) 56' | Stadium: One Call Stadium; Attendance: 8,860 (1,607 away); Referee: Dean Whitestone |

| 22 August 2026 2 | Peterborough United | 2–1 | Mansfield Town | Peterborough |
| 15:00 BST | Woods 50'; Khela (yellow card) 54'; Johnston (yellow card) 66'; Leonard 90+3' | Report | Smith 60'; Oates (yellow card) 79'; Sweeney (yellow card) 87' | Stadium: Weston Homes Stadium; Attendance: 8,900 (1,598 away); Referee: Martin Woods |

| 30 August 2026 3 | Mansfield Town | 5–2 | Luton Town | Mansfield |
| 15:00 BST | Reed (yellow card) 8', (goal) 45'; Moriah-Welsh 17', 28'; Sweeney (yellow card) 45+2'; Russell 47', 56'; Knoyle (yellow card) 77'; Hendry (yellow card) 90+4' | Report | Jones (yellow card) 26'; Kodua (yellow card) 64'; Wells 78' (pen.), 90+2' | Stadium: One Call Stadium; Attendance: 8,754 (1,454 Luton fans); Referee: Richard Eley |
Note: Fixture was initially scheduled for 29 August, but was moved back 24 hours due to both clubs' advancement in the EFL Cup.

| 2 September 2026 4 | Reading | 5–0 | Mansfield Town | Reading |
| 20:00 BST | Marriott 35', 58'; Ward 40'; Earthy 44'; Pereira (yellow card) 72'; Brown 80' | Report | | Stadium: Select Car Leasing Stadium; Attendance: 9,607; Referee: Tom Reeves |
Note: Fixture was initially scheduled for 1 September, but was moved back 24 hours due to both clubs' advancement in the EFL Cup.

| 5 September 2026 5 | Bradford City | 1–0 | Mansfield Town | Bradford |
| 15:00 BST | Sarcevic 18', (yellow card) 63'; Pratt (yellow card) 90+1' | Report | Reed (yellow card) 60'; Hewitt (yellow card) 87' | Stadium: Mbanq Valley Parade; Attendance: 19,927 (1,704 away); Referee: Zac Kennard-Kettle |

| 12 September 2026 6 | Mansfield Town | 0–0 | Huddersfield Town | Mansfield |
| 15:00 BST | Moriah-Welsh (yellow card) 45+1'; Dodgson (red card) 47' | | | Stadium: One Call Stadium; Referee: Martin Coy |

| 19 September 2026 7 | Burton Albion | 2–2 | Mansfield Town | Burton upon Trent |
| 12:30 BST | Oshilaja 16' (o.g.); Armer 28'; Collar (yellow card) 39' | Report | Hewitt (yellow card) 21'; Sweeney (yellow card) 23'; Smith 40', (yellow card) 59'; Reed (yellow card) 49'; Akins 70'; Blake-Tracy (yellow card) 90+3' | Stadium: Pirelli Stadium; Attendance: 4,685 (1,588 Stags' fans); Referee: Oliver Mackey |
Note: Fixture was initially scheduled for a 15:00 kick-off, but was brought forward for live Sky Sports.

| 26 September 2026 8 | Mansfield Town | Postponed | Leyton Orient | Mansfield |
| 15:00 BST | | | | Stadium: One Call Stadium |
Note: Fixture was postponed due to international call-ups.

| 10 October 2026 10 | Mansfield Town | 2–1 | Bromley | Mansfield |
| 15:00 BST | McLaughlin 22'; Moriah-Welsh 49'; Thompson (yellow card) 51'; Reed (yellow card) 60'; Blake-Tracy (yellow card) 74' | | Ifill (yellow card) 13'; McKiernan 30', (yellow card) 32'; Kabamba (yellow card) 90+4'; Saville (yellow card) 90+4' | Stadium: One Call Stadium; Referee: Simon Mather |

| 15 October 2026 11 | Mansfield Town | 1–1 | Oxford United | Mansfield |
| 20:00 BST | Moriah-Welsh (yellow card) 14'; Russell (yellow card) 54'; Smith 82' | | Kioso (yellow card) 22' (yellow-red card) 75'; Lynch 34'; O'Donkor (yellow card) 72' (yellow-red card) 84' | Stadium: One Call Stadium; Attendance: 7,652; Referee: Thomas Parsons |
Note: Fixture was initially scheduled for 17 October, but was brought forward two days for live Sky Sports broadcasting.

| 20 October 2026 12 | AFC Wimbledon | 0–3 | Mansfield Town | Wimbledon |
| 19:45 BST | Yiadom (yellow card) 45+1'; Johnson (yellow card) 69' | Report | Smith 22', 27'; Oshilaja (yellow card) 42'; Russell 73' | Stadium: The Cherry Red Records Stadium; Attendance: 7,262; Referee: Ross Martin |

| 24 October 2026 13 | Blackpool | 1–4 | Mansfield Town | Blackpool |
| 15:00 BST | Morgan (yellow card) 14'; Charles 42'; Anderson (yellow card) 45+1' | Report | Smith 17'; Hewitt (yellow card) 52'; Oates 55'; Niskanen 64' (o.g.); Roberts 78' | Stadium: Bloomfield Road; Attendance: 10,110; Referee: Ollie Yates |

| 31 October 2026 14 | Mansfield Town | 0–2 | Notts County | Mansfield |
| 15:00 GMT | Bowery (yellow card) 56' | Report | Roberts 29', (yellow card) 82'; Finneran (yellow card) 55'; Kanu 65'; Smyth (yellow card) 71' | Stadium: One Call Stadium; Attendance: 9,890; Referee: Seb Stockbridge |

| 3 November 2026 9 | Wigan Athletic | 0–0 | Mansfield Town | Wigan |
| 19:45 GMT | | Report | Hewitt (yellow card) 44'; Sweeney (yellow card) 49'; Bolton (yellow card) 76'; Blake-Tracy (yellow card) 90+1' | Stadium: Brick Community Stadium; Attendance: 7,494; Referee: Scott Oldham |
Note: Fixture was originally scheduled for 3 October but was postponed due to international call-ups and later rearranged for 3 November.

| 14 November 2026 15 | Stevenage | Postponed | Mansfield Town | Stevenage |
| 15:00 GMT | | | | Stadium: Stevenage FC Stadium |
Note: Fixture was postponed due to international call-ups.

| 21 November 2026 16 | Mansfield Town | 1–1 | Milton Keynes Dons | Mansfield |
| 15:00 GMT | Smith 45+1'; Bolton (yellow card) 90' | Report | Sanders (yellow card) 73'; Paterson 80' | Stadium: One Call Stadium; Attendance: 7,766; Referee: Emily Heaslip |

| 28 November 2026 17 | Leicester City | v | Mansfield Town | Leicester |
| 15:00 GMT | | | | Stadium: King Power Stadium |

| 1 December 2026 18 | Mansfield Town | v | Stockport County | Mansfield |
| 19:45 GMT | | | | Stadium: One Call Stadium |

| 12 December 2026 19 | Mansfield Town | v | Wycombe Wanderers | Mansfield |
| 15:00 GMT | | | | Stadium: One Call Stadium |

| 19 December 2026 20 | Plymouth Argyle | v | Mansfield Town | Plymouth |
| 15:00 GMT | | | | Stadium: Home Park |

| 26 December 2026 21 | Mansfield Town | v | Barnsley | Mansfield |
| 15:00 GMT | | | | Stadium: One Call Stadium |

| 29 December 2026 22 | Sheffield Wednesday | v | Mansfield Town | Owlerton |
| 19:45 GMT | | | | Stadium: Hillsborough |

| 2 January 2027 23 | Cambridge United | v | Mansfield Town | Cambridge |
| 15:00 GMT | | | | Stadium: Cledara Abbey Stadium |
Note: Fixture was initially scheduled for 1 January, but was rescheduled for the following day.

| 9 January 2027 24 | Mansfield Town | v | Plymouth Argyle | Mansfield |
| 15:00 GMT | | | | Stadium: One Call Stadium |

| 16 January 2027 25 | Oxford United | v | Mansfield Town | Littlemore |
| 15:00 GMT | | | | Stadium: Kassam Stadium |

| 19 January 2027 26 | Mansfield Town | v | AFC Wimbledon | Mansfield |
| 19:45 GMT | | | | Stadium: One Call Stadium |

| 23 January 2027 27 | Mansfield Town | v | Blackpool | Mansfield |
| 15:00 GMT | | | | Stadium: One Call Stadium |

| 30 January 2027 28 | Notts County | v | Mansfield Town | Nottingham |
| 15:00 GMT | | | | Stadium: Meadow Lane |

| 6 February 2027 29 | Luton Town | v | Mansfield Town | Luton |
| 15:00 GMT | | | | Stadium: Kenilworth Road |

| 9 February 2027 30 | Mansfield Town | v | Reading | Mansfield |
| 19:45 GMT | | | | Stadium: One Call Stadium |

| 13 February 2027 31 | Mansfield Town | v | Bradford City | Mansfield |
| 12:30 GMT | | | | Stadium: One Call Stadium |
Note: Fixture was initially scheduled for a 15:00 kick-off, but was brought forward for live Sky Sports broadcasting.

=== FA Cup ===
Mansfield were drawn at home to Macclesfield in the first round and away to Colchester United in the second round.

Win Draw Loss Fixtures

| 7 November 2026 First round | Mansfield Town | 3–0 | Macclesfield Town | Mansfield |
| 15:00 GMT | Moriah-Welsh 21', (yellow card) 50'; Maris (yellow card) 30'; Oates 73'; Bowery 90+3' | Report | | Stadium: One Call Stadium; Attendance: 4,436 (950 away); Referee: Richie Watkins |

| 4–7 December 2026 Second round | Colchester United | v | Mansfield Town | Colchester |
| TBA GMT | | | | Stadium: JobServe Community Stadium |

=== EFL Cup ===
Mansfield were drawn at home to Sheffield United in the first round.

Win Draw Loss Fixtures

| 9 August 2026 First round | Mansfield Town | 0–3 | Sheffield United | Mansfield |
| 16:00 BST | Reed (yellow card) 63'; Thompson (yellow card) 87' | Report | Bamford 4'; Seriki (yellow card) 37'; McGuinness 71'; O'Hare 89' | Stadium: One Call Stadium; Attendance: 6,908 (1,627 away); Referee: Stephen Martin |

=== EFL Trophy ===
==== Group stage ====
Mansfield were drawn against Chesterfield, Port Vale and Manchester City U21 into Northern Group D.

| Pos | Div | Team | Pld | W | PW | PL | L | GF | GA | GD | Pts | Qualification |
|---|---|---|---|---|---|---|---|---|---|---|---|---|
| 1 | L2 | Chesterfield | 3 | 2 | 1 | 0 | 0 | 11 | 7 | +4 | 8 | Advance to Round 2 |
| 2 | L2 | Port Vale | 3 | 2 | 0 | 1 | 0 | 8 | 1 | +7 | 7 | Advance to Round 2 |
| 3 | ACA | Manchester City U21 | 3 | 1 | 0 | 0 | 2 | 7 | 11 | −4 | 3 | |
| 4 | L1 | Mansfield Town | 3 | 0 | 0 | 0 | 3 | 4 | 11 | −7 | 0 | |

Source: EFL

Win Draw Loss Fixtures

| 19 August 2026 Group stage | Mansfield Town | 1–4 | Manchester City U21 | Mansfield |
| 19:00 BST | Sweeney (yellow card) 45'; Hendry 88' | Report | Parker 23', 28'; Samba 35'; Drake (yellow card) 61'; Midwood 83' | Stadium: One Call Stadium; Attendance: 1,372 (72 away); Referee: Robert Massey-Ellis |

| 6 October 2026 Group stage | Port Vale | 2–0 | Mansfield Town | Burslem |
| 19:00 BST | McLaughlin 4' (o.g.); Asamoah 58'; Headley (yellow card) 82' | | Sweeney (yellow card) 67'; Russell (yellow card) 72' | Stadium: Vale Park; Attendance: 841; Referee: Michael Barlow |

| 10 November 2026 Group stage | Mansfield Town | 3–5 | Chesterfield | Mansfield |
| 19:00 GMT | Russell 13' (pen.), 20'; Hendry 61'; Dodgson (yellow card) 86' | Report | Lamptey (yellow card) 18'; Randall 45'; Duffy 62', 70'; Naylor 67'; Mandeville 88' (pen.) | Stadium: One Call Stadium; Attendance: 5,233 (1,579 away); Referee: Sam Mulhall |

== Statistics ==
=== Appearances and goals ===
As of match played 10 November 2026

Players with no appearances are not included on the list; italics indicate loaned in player

| No. | Pos | Nat | Player | Total | | League One | | FA Cup | | EFL Cup | | EFL Trophy | |
| No. | Pos | Nat | Player | Apps | Goals | Apps | Goals | Apps | Goals | Apps | Goals | Apps | Goals |
|---|---|---|---|---|---|---|---|---|---|---|---|---|---|
| 1 | GK | (England) ENG | Liam Roberts | 12 | 0 | 11+0 | 0 | 1+0 | 0 | 0+0 | 0 | 0+0 | 0 |
| 2 | DF | (England) ENG | Kyle Knoyle | 11 | 0 | 3+4 | 0 | 0+1 | 0 | 0+0 | 0 | 3+0 | 0 |
| 3 | DF | (Republic of Ireland) IRL | Stephen McLaughlin | 15 | 1 | 9+1 | 1 | 1+0 | 0 | 1+0 | 0 | 2+1 | 0 |
| 4 | DF | (Wales) WAL | Elliott Hewitt | 16 | 0 | 7+5 | 0 | 0+1 | 0 | 0+1 | 0 | 2+0 | 0 |
| 5 | DF | (Republic of Ireland) IRL | Ryan Sweeney | 17 | 0 | 13+0 | 0 | 1+0 | 0 | 1+0 | 0 | 1+1 | 0 |
| 7 | FW | (Grenada) GRN | Lucas Akins | 7 | 1 | 3+2 | 1 | 0+0 | 0 | 1+0 | 0 | 0+1 | 0 |
| 8 | DF | (England) ENG | Luke Bolton | 10 | 0 | 0+8 | 0 | 0+0 | 0 | 0+0 | 0 | 2+0 | 0 |
| 9 | DF | (Saint Kitts and Nevis) SKN | Jordan Bowery | 5 | 1 | 3+1 | 0 | 1+0 | 1 | 0+0 | 0 | 0+0 | 0 |
| 10 | MF | (England) ENG | George Maris | 13 | 0 | 2+7 | 0 | 1+0 | 0 | 0+0 | 0 | 3+0 | 0 |
| 13 | MF | (Jamaica) JAM | Jon Russell | 13 | 5 | 9+0 | 3 | 1+0 | 0 | 1+0 | 0 | 1+1 | 2 |
| 14 | FW | (England) ENG | Michael Smith | 16 | 6 | 12+0 | 6 | 1+0 | 0 | 0+1 | 0 | 2+0 | 0 |
| 16 | MF | (England) ENG | Liam Thompson | 13 | 0 | 11+0 | 0 | 0+0 | 0 | 0+1 | 0 | 0+1 | 0 |
| 17 | FW | (Republic of Ireland) IRL | David McGoldrick | 6 | 0 | 3+2 | 0 | 0+0 | 0 | 1+0 | 0 | 0+0 | 0 |
| 18 | FW | (England) ENG | Rhys Oates | 17 | 3 | 6+7 | 2 | 1+0 | 1 | 0+1 | 0 | 1+1 | 0 |
| 19 | FW | (Wales) WAL | Tyler Roberts | 10 | 1 | 1+5 | 1 | 0+1 | 0 | 1+0 | 0 | 0+2 | 0 |
| 20 | DF | (England) ENG | Frazer Blake-Tracy | 16 | 0 | 3+8 | 0 | 1+0 | 0 | 1+0 | 0 | 2+1 | 0 |
| 21 | GK | (England) ENG | Harry Lewis | 6 | 0 | 2+0 | 0 | 0+0 | 0 | 1+0 | 0 | 3+0 | 0 |
| 22 | MF | (Guyana) GUY | Nathan Moriah-Welsh | 16 | 4 | 11+2 | 3 | 1+0 | 1 | 0+1 | 0 | 1+0 | 0 |
| 23 | DF | (England) ENG | Deji Oshilaja | 16 | 0 | 13+0 | 0 | 0+0 | 0 | 1+0 | 0 | 1+1 | 0 |
| 24 | MF | (Scotland) SCO | Regan Hendry | 17 | 2 | 4+8 | 0 | 1+0 | 0 | 1+0 | 0 | 3+0 | 2 |
| 25 | MF | (England) ENG | Louis Reed | 16 | 2 | 13+0 | 2 | 0+0 | 0 | 1+0 | 0 | 2+0 | 0 |
| 28 | MF | (England) ENG | Ollie Taylor | 3 | 0 | 0+0 | 0 | 0+1 | 0 | 0+0 | 0 | 1+1 | 0 |
| 33 | MF | (England) ENG | George Abbott | 5 | 0 | 3+1 | 0 | 0+0 | 0 | 0+0 | 0 | 0+1 | 0 |
| 34 | DF | (England) ENG | Taylor Anderson | 1 | 0 | 0+0 | 0 | 0+0 | 0 | 0+0 | 0 | 0+1 | 0 |
| 35 | MF | (England) ENG | Joshua Walters | 1 | 0 | 0+0 | 0 | 0+0 | 0 | 0+0 | 0 | 0+1 | 0 |
| 39 | DF | (England) ENG | Owen Dodgson | 8 | 0 | 1+3 | 0 | 0+1 | 0 | 0+0 | 0 | 3+0 | 0 |

=== Disciplinary record ===
As of match played 10 November 2026

Includes all competitive matches. The list is sorted by squad number when disciplinary points / points per card / number of cards are equal. Players with no cards not included in the list.

| Rank | No. | Pos. | Nat. | Name | League One | | | FA Cup | | | EFL Cup | | | EFL Trophy | | | Total | | |
| Rank | No. | Pos. | Nat. | Name | Yellow card | Second yellow card | Red card | Yellow card | Second yellow card | Red card | Yellow card | Second yellow card | Red card | Yellow card | Second yellow card | Red card | Yellow card | Second yellow card | Red card |
|---|---|---|---|---|---|---|---|---|---|---|---|---|---|---|---|---|---|---|---|
| 1 | 5 | CB | (Republic of Ireland) | Ryan Sweeney | 4 | 0 | 0 | 0 | 0 | 0 | 0 | 0 | 0 | 2 | 0 | 0 | 6 | 0 | 0 |
| 2 | 25 | CM | (England) | Louis Reed | 4 | 0 | 0 | 0 | 0 | 0 | 1 | 0 | 0 | 0 | 0 | 0 | 5 | 0 | 0 |
| 3 | 5 | RB | (Wales) | Elliott Hewitt | 4 | 0 | 0 | 0 | 0 | 0 | 0 | 0 | 0 | 0 | 0 | 0 | 4 | 0 | 0 |
| 3 | 20 | CB | (England) | Frazer Blake-Tracy | 4 | 0 | 0 | 0 | 0 | 0 | 0 | 0 | 0 | 0 | 0 | 0 | 4 | 0 | 0 |
| 3 | 39 | LB | (England) | Owen Dodgson | 0 | 0 | 1 | 0 | 0 | 0 | 0 | 0 | 0 | 1 | 0 | 0 | 1 | 0 | 1 |
| 6 | 16 | CM | (England) | Liam Thompson | 2 | 0 | 0 | 0 | 0 | 0 | 1 | 0 | 0 | 0 | 0 | 0 | 3 | 0 | 0 |
| 6 | 22 | CM | (Guyana) | Nathan Moriah-Welsh | 2 | 0 | 0 | 1 | 0 | 0 | 0 | 0 | 0 | 0 | 0 | 0 | 3 | 0 | 0 |
| 8 | 13 | CM | (Jamaica) | Jon Russell | 1 | 0 | 0 | 0 | 0 | 0 | 0 | 0 | 0 | 1 | 0 | 0 | 2 | 0 | 0 |
| 9 | 2 | RB | (England) | Kyle Knoyle | 1 | 0 | 0 | 0 | 0 | 0 | 0 | 0 | 0 | 0 | 0 | 0 | 1 | 0 | 0 |
| 9 | 4 | RB | (Wales) | Elliott Hewitt | 1 | 0 | 0 | 0 | 0 | 0 | 0 | 0 | 0 | 0 | 0 | 0 | 1 | 0 | 0 |
| 9 | 8 | RB | (England) | Luke Bolton | 1 | 0 | 0 | 0 | 0 | 0 | 0 | 0 | 0 | 0 | 0 | 0 | 1 | 0 | 0 |
| 9 | 9 | CB | (Saint Kitts and Nevis) | Jordan Bowery | 1 | 0 | 0 | 0 | 0 | 0 | 0 | 0 | 0 | 0 | 0 | 0 | 1 | 0 | 0 |
| 9 | 10 | CAM | (England) | George Maris | 0 | 0 | 0 | 1 | 0 | 0 | 0 | 0 | 0 | 0 | 0 | 0 | 1 | 0 | 0 |
| 9 | 14 | CF | (England) | Michael Smith | 1 | 0 | 0 | 0 | 0 | 0 | 0 | 0 | 0 | 0 | 0 | 0 | 1 | 0 | 0 |
| 9 | 18 | CF | (England) | Rhys Oates | 1 | 0 | 0 | 0 | 0 | 0 | 0 | 0 | 0 | 0 | 0 | 0 | 1 | 0 | 0 |
| 9 | 23 | CB | (England) | Deji Oshilaja | 1 | 0 | 0 | 0 | 0 | 0 | 0 | 0 | 0 | 0 | 0 | 0 | 1 | 0 | 0 |
| 9 | 24 | CM | (Scotland) | Regan Hendry | 1 | 0 | 0 | 0 | 0 | 0 | 0 | 0 | 0 | 0 | 0 | 0 | 1 | 0 | 0 |
| Total | | | | | 29 | 0 | 1 | 2 | 0 | 0 | 2 | 0 | 0 | 4 | 0 | 0 | 37 | 0 | 1 |

== Awards ==
=== Player Awards ===
==== EFL League One Goal of the Month ====
| Month | Player | Opposition | Result | Ref. |
|---|---|---|---|---|
| August | (Guyana) Nathan Moriah-Welsh | v. Luton Town | Nominated | |
