= Taylor Anderson =

Taylor Anderson may refer to:

- Taylor Anderson (author), American author
- Taylor Anderson (curler) (born 1995), American curler
- Taylor Anderson (footballer) (born 2004), English footballer
