= Dickov =

Dickov is a surname. Notable people with the surname include:

- Max Dickov (born 2002), English football forward
- Paul Dickov (born 1972), Scottish television pundit, former football manager, and former football forward
