= Harry Lewis (footballer, born 1997) =

English footballer

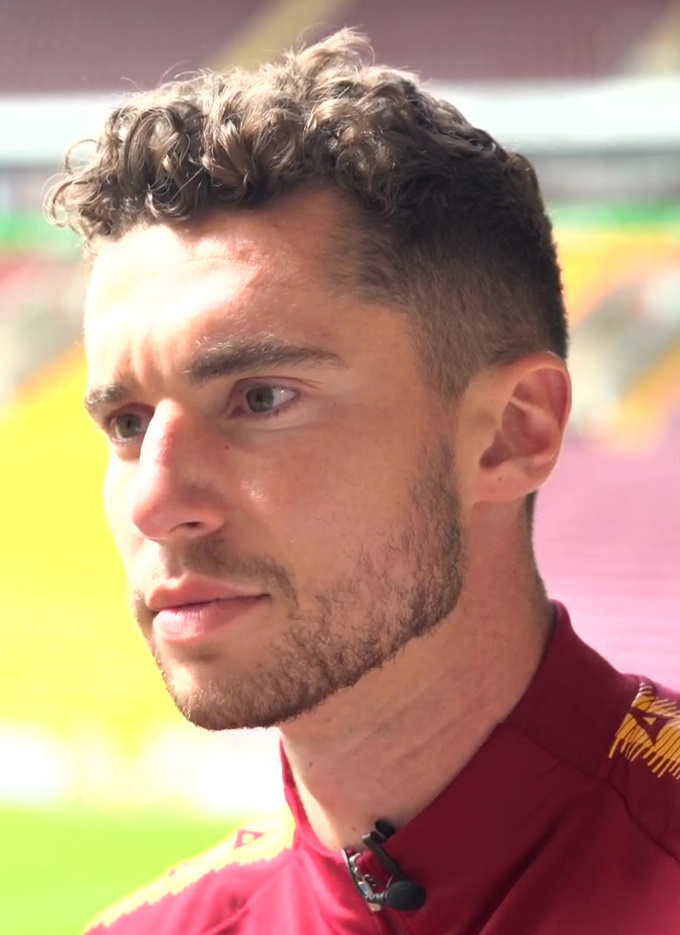
- Lewis in 2022

Personal information
- Full name: Harry Charles John Lewis
- Date of birth: 20 December 1997 (age 28)
- Place of birth: Shrewsbury, England
- Height: 6 ft 3 in (1.91 m)
- Position: Goalkeeper

Team information
- Current team: Mansfield Town
- Number: 21

Youth career
- –2015: Shrewsbury Town
- 2016–2017: Southampton

Senior career*
Years	Team	Apps	(Gls)
2016–2022	Southampton	0	(0)
2017–2018	→ Dundee United (loan)	30	(0)
2022–2024	Bradford City	72	(0)
2024–2026	Carlisle United	34	(0)
2026–	Mansfield Town	5	(0)

International career^{‡}
2014	England U18	1	(0)
- * Club domestic league appearances and goals as of 05:21, 29 September 2026 (UTC) ‡ National team caps and goals as of 17:16, 7 January 2016 (UTC)

Harry Charles John Lewis (born 20 December 1997) is an English professional footballer who plays as a goalkeeper for club Mansfield Town.

== Club career ==
=== Southampton ===
Lewis joined Southampton's academy from Shrewsbury Town in 2015. After impressing with the under-23 side, Lewis made his professional debut for Southampton on 7 January 2017 against Norwich City in an FA Cup match. He conceded a penalty in the match as Southampton drew 2–2 at Carrow Road.

On 14 July 2017, he joined Scottish Championship club Dundee United on a one-year loan, having also signed a new three-year contract with Southampton. Five days later, he made his debut in a 3–0 win at Highland Football League club Buckie Thistle in the Scottish League Cup. He made 39 appearances in all competitions as Dundee United came third in the league and were eliminated 4–3 on aggregate by Livingston in the play-off semi-finals.

=== Bradford City ===
On 16 May 2022, it was confirmed that Lewis would join Bradford City on 1 July 2022 once his contract expired. In March 2023, Lewis handled the ball outside of the area at Newport County's Rodney Parade, after confusing the rugby markings on the pitch.

=== Carlisle United ===
On 11 January 2024, Lewis signed for League One club Carlisle United for an undisclosed fee, on a two-and-a-half year deal.

=== Mansfield Town ===
On 30 January 2026, Lewis signed for League One side Mansfield Town for an undisclosed fee. He signed an 18 month deal.

== International career ==
Lewis has represented England at under-18 level. On 24 September 2014, he came on to the field to make his England U18s debut, replacing goalkeeper and captain Freddie Woodman in a 2–0 friendly defeat away to Italy at the Stadio Giovanni Chiggiato.

== Personal life ==
Lewis is the grandson of former Shrewsbury Town and Stockport County goalkeeper Ken Mulhearn.

== Career statistics ==
As of match played 5 September 2026

Appearances and goals by club, season and competition
Club	Season	League			National Cup (Note: Includes FA Cup, Scottish Cup)		League Cup (Note: Includes EFL Cup, Scottish League Cup)		Other		Total	
Club	Season	Division	Apps	Goals	Apps	Goals	Apps	Goals	Apps	Goals	Apps	Goals
Southampton U23	2016–17	—			—		—		3 (Note: Appearances in EFL Trophy)	0	3	0
Southampton U23	2018–19	—			—		—		3	0	3	0
Southampton U23	2019–20	—			—		—		2	0	2	0
Southampton U23	2020–21	—			—		—		3	0	3	0
Southampton U23	Total		—		—		—		11	0	11	0
Southampton	2016–17	Premier League	0	0	3	0	0	0	—		3	0
Southampton	2017–18	Premier League	0	0	0	0	0	0	—		0	0
Southampton	2018–19	Premier League	0	0	0	0	0	0	—		0	0
Southampton	2019–20	Premier League	0	0	0	0	0	0	—		0	0
Southampton	2020–21	Premier League	0	0	0	0	0	0	—		0	0
Southampton	2021–22	Premier League	0	0	0	0	0	0	—		0	0
Southampton	Total		0	0	3	0	0	0	—		3	0
Dundee United (loan)	2017–18	Scottish Championship	30	0	2	0	4	0	3 (Note: Appearances in Scottish Premiership play-offs)	0	39	0
Bradford City	2022–23	League Two	46	0	1	0	2	0	4	0	53	0
Bradford City	2023–24	League Two	26	0	1	0	3	0	1	0	31	0
Bradford City	Total		72	0	2	0	5	0	5	0	84	0
Carlisle United	2023–24	League One	20	0	—		—		—		20	0
Carlisle United	2024–25	League Two	14	0	0	0	1	0	1	0	16	0
Carlisle United	2025–26	National League	0	0	2	0	—		3 (Note: Appearances in FA Trophy)	0	5	0
Carlisle United	Total		34	0	2	0	1	0	4	0	41	0
Mansfield Town	2025–26	League One	3	0	0	0	—		—		3	0
Mansfield Town	2026–27	League One	2	0	0	0	1	0	1	0	4	0
Mansfield Town	Total		5	0	0	0	1	0	1	0	7	0
Career total			141	0	9	0	11	0	24	0	185	0
