= 2025–26 Mansfield Town F.C. season =

129th season in existence of Mansfield Town FC

Mansfield Town
2025–26 season
- Owner: John Radford
- Chief Executive: Carolyn Radford
- Manager: Nigel Clough
- Stadium: Field Mill
- League One: 10th
- FA Cup: Fifth round
- EFL Cup: Second round
- EFL Trophy: Group stage
- Top goalscorer: League: Lucas Akins (9); All: Will Evans, Rhys Oates (11)

The 2025–26 season was the 129th season in the history of Mansfield Town Football Club and their second consecutive season League One, the third-tier of English football. In addition to the domestic league, the club also participated in the FA Cup, the EFL Cup, and the EFL Trophy.

== Transfers and contracts ==
=== In ===
| Date | Pos. | Player | From | Fee | Ref. |
|---|---|---|---|---|---|
| 27 June 2025 | CM | (Guyana) Nathan Moriah-Welsh | (Scotland) Hibernian | Undisclosed | |
| 1 July 2025 (Note: The transfer was announced on 28 May, and would become official on July 1 once his Tranmere contract had ended) | CM | (Scotland) Regan Hendry | (England) Tranmere Rovers | Free | |
| 1 July 2025 (Note: The transfer was announced on 12 June, and would become official on July 1 once his Stockport contract had ended) | RB | (England) Kyle Knoyle | (England) Stockport County | Free | |
| 1 July 2025 (Note: The transfer was announced on 11 June, and would become official on July 1 once his Millwall contract had ended) | GK | (England) Liam Roberts | (England) Millwall | Free | |
| 1 July 2025 (Note: The transfer was announced on 20 May, and would become official on July 1 once his Burton contract had ended) | CB | (Republic of Ireland) Ryan Sweeney | (England) Burton Albion | Free | |
| 19 July 2025 | RB | (England) Luke Bolton | (Wales) Wrexham | Undisclosed | |
| 16 August 2025 | CF | (England) Max Dickov | (England) Brentord | Free | |
| 10 September 2025 | CF | (England) Jack Goodman | (England) Basford United | Free Transfer | |
| 9 January 2026 | CF | (Nigeria) Victor Adeboyejo | (England) Bolton Wanderers | Undisclosed | |
| 30 January 2026 | GK | (England) Harry Lewis | (England) Carlisle United | Undisclosed | |
| 2 February 2026 | SS | (Wales) Tyler Roberts | (England) Birmingham City | Free Transfer | |

=== Out ===
| Date | Pos. | Player | To | Fee | Ref. |
|---|---|---|---|---|---|
| 8 June 2025 | CF | (England) James Gale | (England) Altrincham | Free transfer (Note: Includes a sell-on clause) | |
| 7 August 2025 | DM | (Australia) Keanu Baccus | (Scotland) St Mirren | Undisclosed | |

=== Loaned in ===
| Date | Pos. | Player | From | Date until | Ref. |
|---|---|---|---|---|---|
| 23 June 2025 | LM | (England) Kyle McAdam | (England) Nottingham Forest | 12 January 2026 (Note: On 12 January, McAdam's initial season-long loan from Nottingham Forest was terminated) | |
| 14 July 2025 | CF | (Republic of Ireland) Joe Gardner | (England) Nottingham Forest | 31 May 2026 | |
| 18 July 2025 | CDM | (Northern Ireland) Jamie McDonnell | (England) Nottingham Forest | 17 January 2026 (Note: On 17 January, McDonnell was recalled to Nottingham Forest from his initial season-long loan) | |
| 1 September 2025 | SS | (Wales) Tyler Roberts | (England) Birmingham City | 2 February 2026 (Note: On 2 February, Roberts joined the club on a permanent basis) | |
| 8 January 2026 | RW | (England) Oliver Irow | (England) Tottenham Hotspur | 31 May 2026 | |
| 8 January 2026 | CM | (Jamaica) Jon Russell | (England) Barnsley | 31 May 2026 | |
| 2 February 2026 | CDM | (England) George Abbott | (England) Tottenham Hotspur | 31 May 2026 | |

=== Loaned out ===
| Date | Pos. | Player | To | Date until | Ref. |
|---|---|---|---|---|---|
| 10 September 2025 | CF | (England) Jack Goodman | (England) Basford United | 22 January 2026 (Note: On 22 January, Goodman was recalled from his season-long loan at Basford United and subsequently joined King's Lynn Town on loan) | |
| 30 September 2025 | GK | (Dominican Republic) Anthony Núñez | (England) Anstey Nomads | 31 May 2026 (Note: On 26 November, Núñez's loan at Anstey Nomads was extended until the end of season) | |
| 21 October 2025 | RB | (England) Taylor Anderson | (England) Alfreton Town | 18 November 2025 | |
| 13 November 2025 | CDM | (England) Finn Flanagan | (England) Matlock Town | 5 February 2026 | |
| 28 November 2025 | CF | (Pakistan) McKeal Abdullah | (England) Rushall Olympic | 21 February 2026 | |
| 28 November 2025 | CAM | (Poland) Jakub Kruszynski | (England) Rushall Olympic | 21 February 2026 | |
| 15 January 2026 | CB | (England) George Cooper | (England) Truro City | 31 May 2026 | |
| 22 January 2026 | RB | (England) Taylor Anderson | (England) King's Lynn Town | 19 February 2026 | |
| 22 January 2026 | CF | (England) Jack Goodman | (England) King's Lynn Town | 19 February 2026 | |
| 20 January 2026 | GK | (Republic of Ireland) Owen Mason | (England) Southend United | 31 May 2026 | |
| 2 February 2026 | CF | (England) Max Dickov | (England) Tranmere Rovers | 31 May 2026 | |
| 23 February 2026 | CF | (England) Jack Goodman | (England) Alfreton Town | 24 March 2026 (Note: On 24 March, Goodman was recalled from his short-term loan at Alfreton Town) | |

=== Released / Out of Contract ===
| Date | Pos. | Player | Subsequent club | Join date | Ref. |
|---|---|---|---|---|---|
| 30 June 2025 | CB | (England) Alfie Kilgour | (England) Bristol Rovers | 1 July 2025 | |
| 30 June 2025 | CF | (England) Tom Nichols | (England) Swindon Town | 1 July 2025 | |
| 30 June 2025 | CM | (England) Hiram Boateng | (England) York City | 1 July 2025 | |
| 30 June 2025 | GK | (Northern Ireland) Christy Pym | (England) Grimsby Town | 9 July 2025 | |
| 30 June 2025 | CB | (England) Aden Flint | (England) Walsall | 21 July 2025 | |
| 30 June 2025 | LB | (Scotland) Calum Macdonald | | | |
| 30 June 2025 | RW | (Republic of Ireland) Ben Quinn | | | |
| 30 June 2025 | CM | (Republic of Ireland) Stephen Quinn | | | |
| 30 June 2025 | RB | (England) George Williams | | | |
| 30 June 2025 | GK | (England) Scott Flinders | Retired | | |

=== New Contract ===
| Date | Pos. | Player | Contract until | Ref. |
|---|---|---|---|---|
| 31 May 2025 | LB | (Republic of Ireland) Stephen McLaughlin | 30 June 2026 | |
| 6 June 2025 | CB | (England) Baily Cargill | 30 June 2027 | |
| 7 July 2025 | CF | (United States) Dom Dwyer | 30 June 2026 | |
| 2 January 2026 | CF | (England) Rhys Oates | 30 June 2027 | |
| 14 January 2026 | CM | (England) Louis Reed | 30 June 2027 | |
| 20 January 2026 | CB | (England) Deji Oshilaja | 30 June 2028 | |
| 12 March 2026 | CB | (England) Frazer Blake-Tracy | 30 June 2028 | |

== Pre-season and friendlies ==
On 21 May, Mansfield Town announced their first pre-season friendly, against Macclesfield. A week later, a further two friendlies were confirmed, against Retford United and Matlock Town. On 13 June, a home fixture against Oxford United was added. A fifth friendly was later announced, against Sligo Rovers. On 4 July, a sixth fixture was confirmed against Middlesbrough. Three days later, a behind closed doors friendly against Sheffield Wednesday was confirmed.

Win Draw Loss Fixtures

| 8 July 2025 Friendly | Retford United | 0–6 | Mansfield Town | Retford |
| 19:00 BST | | Report | Evans 23'; Dwyer 47', 65'; McAdam 69'; Hewitt 78'; Lewis 86' | Stadium: Cannon Park; Attendance: 1,444 |

| 12 July 2025 Friendly | Macclesfield | 0–2 | Mansfield Town | Macclesfield |
| 15:00 BST | | Report | Dwyer 17'; Oates 64' | Stadium: Moss Rose; Attendance: 630; Referee: George Eaton |

| 15 July 2025 Friendly | Sligo Rovers | 1–3 | Mansfield Town | Sligo, Republic of Ireland |
| 19:30 BST | Zefi 8' | | Oates 16'; Oates 17'; Dwyer 89' | Stadium: The Showgrounds |

| 19 July 2025 Friendly | Mansfield Town | 3–3 | Middlesbrough | Mansfield |
| 15:00 BST | Moriah-Welsh 61'; McLaughlin 83'; Bowery 87' (pen.) | Report | Fry 22'; Conway 34'; Whittaker 38' | Stadium: Field Mill; Attendance: 2,633 (422 away); Referee: Andrew Kitchen |

| 22 July 2025 Friendly | Mansfield Town | 0–1 | Oxford United | Mansfield |
| 19:30 BST | | Report | Bradshaw 2' | Stadium: Field Mill; Attendance: 1,476 (90 Oxford fans); Referee: Declan Bourne |

| 26 July 2025 Friendly | Sheffield Wednesday | v | Mansfield Town | Sheffield |
| 15:00 BST | | | | Stadium: Middlewood Road Training Ground; Attendance: 0 (behind-closed-doors) |

| 29 July 2025 Friendly | Matlock Town | 1–1 | Mansfield Town | Matlock |
| 19:30 BST | Thompson 2' | Report | Maris 37' | Stadium: Causeway Lane; Attendance: 1,414 |

== Competitions ==
=== League One ===
==== League table ====
| Pos | Team | Pld | W | D | L | GF | GA | GD | Pts |
|---|---|---|---|---|---|---|---|---|---|
| 8 | Plymouth Argyle | 46 | 22 | 7 | 17 | 75 | 63 | +12 | 73 |
| 9 | Huddersfield Town | 46 | 18 | 13 | 15 | 74 | 64 | +10 | 67 |
| 10 | Mansfield Town | 46 | 16 | 17 | 13 | 62 | 50 | +12 | 65 |
| 11 | Wycombe Wanderers | 46 | 17 | 12 | 17 | 69 | 58 | +11 | 63 |
| 12 | Reading | 46 | 16 | 15 | 15 | 64 | 60 | +4 | 63 |

Source: EFL Official Website
Rules for classification: 1) Points; 2) Goal difference; 3) Number of goals scored; 4) Head-to-head results; 5) Wins; 6) Away goals; 7) Penalty points (sec 9.5); 8) 12-point sending off offences

==== Results summary ====
| Overall | | | | | | | | Home | | | | | | Away | | | | | |
| Pld | W | D | L | GF | GA | GD | Pts | W | D | L | GF | GA | GD | W | D | L | GF | GA | GD |
|---|---|---|---|---|---|---|---|---|---|---|---|---|---|---|---|---|---|---|---|
| 46 | 16 | 17 | 13 | 62 | 50 | +12 | 65 | 9 | 8 | 6 | 38 | 27 | +11 | 7 | 9 | 7 | 24 | 23 | +1 |

Last updated: complete.
Source: Soccerway

==== Matches ====
On 26 June, the League One fixtures were released, with Mansfield travelling to Burton Albion on the opening weekend.

Win Draw Loss Fixtures

| 2 August 2025 1 | Burton Albion | 2–1 | Mansfield Town | Burton upon Trent |
| 15:00 BST | Webster 22', 50'; Moon (yellow card) 49'; Godwin-Malife (yellow card) 76' | Report | McLaughlin (yellow card) 64'; Cargill 76'; Maris (yellow card) 90' | Stadium: Pirelli Stadium; Attendance: 5,170 (1,630 Stags supporters); Referee: Edward Duckworth |

| 9 August 2025 2 | Mansfield Town | 1–2 | Doncaster Rovers | Mansfield |
| 15:00 BST | McAdam (yellow card) 19'; McLaughlin 57'; Bowery (yellow card) 90+7' | Report | Crew (yellow card) 55'; Bailey 76', 90+6' | Stadium: Field Mill; Attendance: 8,798 (1,573 away fans); Referee: Andrew Humphries |

| 16 August 2025 3 | Exeter City | 1–2 | Mansfield Town | Exeter |
| 12:30 BST | Fitzwater (yellow card) 46'; Swinkels (yellow card) 71'; Magennis 76' (pen.) | Report | Blake-Tracy 42', (yellow card) 78'; Evans 86' | Stadium: St James Park; Attendance: 6,166 (655 Stags' supporters); Referee: Ollie Yates |
Note: Fixture was originally scheduled for a 15:00 kick-off, but was moved live Sky Sports broadcasting.

| 19 August 2025 4 | Mansfield Town | 2–0 | Blackpool | Mansfield |
| 19:45 BST | Evans (penalty missed) 45+3'; McDonnell 47', 55' | Report | | Stadium: Field Mill; Attendance: 7,574 (576 away supporters); Referee: Ben Toner |

| 23 August 2025 5 | Mansfield Town | 4–1 | Leyton Orient | Mansfield |
| 15:00 BST | Hendry 15', 29'; Cargill (yellow card) 42'; Evans (yellow card) 50', (goal) 59'; Bolton 90+5' | Report | Koroma 37'; El Mizouni (yellow card) 51' (yellow-red card) 62' | Stadium: Field Mill; Attendance: 7,537 (479 away fans); Referee: Carl Brook |

| 30 August 2025 6 | Lincoln City | 1–1 | Mansfield Town | Lincoln |
| 15:00 BST | Bradley 18', (red card) 30'; Draper (yellow card) 35'; Bayliss (yellow card) 52'; Hackett (yellow card) 53'; Towler (yellow card) 58'; Hamer (yellow card) 59'; Wickens (yellow card) 79' | Report | Dwyer (yellow card) 55'; Moriah-Welsh 82'; Cargill (yellow card) 88' | Stadium: Sincil Bank; Attendance: 9,626 (1,833 Stags fans); Referee: Aaron Bannister |

| 6 September 2025 7 | Wycombe Wanderers | 2–0 | Mansfield Town | High Wycombe |
| 15:00 BST | Leahy (yellow card) 10'; Bell 14'; Woodrow 52' (pen.), (yellow card) 58'; Henderson (yellow card) 88' | Report | Sweeney (yellow card) 28'; Bowery (yellow card) 45+4'; Blake-Tracy (yellow card) 51' | Stadium: Adams Park; Attendance: 5,080 (832 Stags fans); Referee: Scott Oldham |

| 13 September 2025 8 | Mansfield Town | 1–1 | Stevenage | Mansfield |
| 15:00 BST | Blake-Tracy (yellow card) 31'; Moriah-Welsh (yellow card) 66'; Gardner 73' | Report | Freestone (yellow card) 45+2'; Goode 70'; Lubala (yellow card) 75'; White (yellow card) 79'; Piergianni (yellow card) 90' | Stadium: Field Mill; Attendance: 7,301 (248 away fans); Referee: Martin Woods |

| 20 September 2025 9 | Port Vale | 2–1 | Mansfield Town | Burslem |
| 15:00 BST | Cole 53'; Paton (yellow card) 56'; Gordon (yellow card) 71'; Curtis 90+5' (pen.) | Report | Sweeney (red card) 14'; Lewis (yellow card) 56'; Oates 86' | Stadium: Vale Park; Attendance: 9,013 (1,879 Stags fans); Referee: Alex Chilowicz |

| 27 September 2025 10 | Mansfield Town | 2–1 | Rotherham United | Mansfield |
| 15:00 BST | Roberts (yellow card) 32', (goal) 62'; Moriah-Welsh (yellow card) 35'; McLaughlin (yellow card) 45+4'; Dwyer 90' | Report | Hugill 7' (pen.); Hall (yellow card) 20'; Agbaire (yellow card) 38'; Gore (yellow card) 45+3'; James (yellow card) 88' | Stadium: Field Mill; Attendance: 8,201 (922 Rotherham fans); Referee: Simon Mather |

| 4 October 2025 11 | Reading | 1–1 | Mansfield Town | Reading |
| 15:00 BST | Burns (yellow card) 66'; Marriott 71'; Ritchie (yellow card) 90+2' | Report | Roberts 7'; Knoyle (yellow card) 90+6' | Stadium: Madejski Stadium; Attendance: 12,328 (863 Stags fans); Referee: Paul Tierney |

| 18 October 2025 13 | Luton Town | 0–2 | Mansfield Town | Luton |
| 15:00 BST | Wells (penalty missed) 34' | Report | Oates 40'; Roberts 59' (pen.) | Stadium: Kenilworth Road; Attendance: 11,784 (1,308 Stags fans); Referee: Ross Joyce |

| 25 October 2025 14 | Mansfield Town | 1–1 | Wigan Athletic | Mansfield |
| 12:30 BST | Evans 32'; McDonnell (yellow card) 45+2' | Report | Smith (yellow card) 39'; Murray (yellow card) 45'; Cooper 59'; Saydee (yellow card) 61' | Stadium: Field Mill; Attendance: 7,598 (533 away fans); Referee: Seb Stockbridge |
Note: Fixture was originally scheduled for a 15:00 kick-off, but was moved live Sky Sports broadcasting.

| 28 October 2025 12 | Mansfield Town | 2–0 | Plymouth Argyle | Mansfield |
| 19:45 GMT | Evans 6'; McDonnell (yellow card) 73'; Bowery 84' | Report | Dale (yellow card) 23'; Roberts (yellow card) 87' | Stadium: Field Mill; Attendance: 7,605 (704 visiting supporters); Referee: Matthew Russell |
Note: Fixture was originally scheduled for 11 October, but was postponed due to international call-ups.

| 8 November 2025 15 | Northampton Town | 2–1 | Mansfield Town | Northampton |
| 12:30 GMT | Perkins 53'; Eaves 74' (pen.); Thorniley (yellow card) 83' | Report | Oates 18' | Stadium: Sixfields Stadium; Attendance: 6,871 (1,471 Stags supporters); Referee: Elliot Bell |
Note: Fixture was originally scheduled for a 15:00 kick-off, but was moved live Sky Sports broadcasting.

| 22 November 2025 17 | Mansfield Town | 1–3 | Huddersfield Town | Mansfield |
| 15:00 GMT | Lewis (yellow card) 20'; Evans 64' | Report | Radulović 5'; Charles 12'; Sørensen 16'; Feeney (yellow card) 19' | Stadium: Field Mill; Attendance: 8,590 (1,478 away fans); Referee: Craig Hicks |

| 29 November 2025 18 | Cardiff City | 3–0 | Mansfield Town | Leckwith |
| 15:00 GMT | Fish 34'; Robinson (yellow card) 62'; Salech 70'; Ashford 87' | Report | McLaughlin (yellow card) 40' | Stadium: Cardiff City Stadium; Attendance: 18,174; Referee: Ben Atkinson |

| 9 December 2025 19 | Mansfield Town | 0–1 | Bolton Wanderers | Mansfield |
| 19:45 GMT | Oates (red card) 13' | Report | Johnston (yellow card) 6'; Osei-Tutu 40' | Stadium: Field Mill; Attendance: 7,628 (870 away fans); Referee: Thomas Parsons |

| 13 December 2025 20 | AFC Wimbledon | 0–0 | Mansfield Town | Wimbledon |
| 12:30 GMT | Browne (yellow card) 62'; Nkeng (yellow card) 90+5' | Report | Cargill (yellow card) 26'; Hewitt (yellow card) 37'; McLaughlin (yellow card) 90+3' | Stadium: Plough Lane; Attendance: 8,474 (868 Stags fans); Referee: Elliot Bell |
Note: Fixture was originally scheduled for a 15:00 kick-off, but was moved live Sky Sports broadcasting.

| 20 December 2025 21 | Mansfield Town | 1–2 | Stockport County | Mansfield |
| 15:00 GMT | Wootton 28' (o.g.); Evans (yellow card) 41'; Oshilaja (yellow card) 66' | Report | Pye (yellow card) 20'; Sweeney 42' (o.g.); Hills (yellow card) 61'; Diamond 69' | Stadium: Field Mill; Attendance: 8,016 (1,053 away fans); Referee: Alan Young |

| 26 December 2025 22 | Barnsley | 2–3 | Mansfield Town | Barnsley |
| 15:00 GMT | Cleary 2'; Keillor-Dunn 13' | Report | Reed 25' (pen.); Hewitt (yellow card) 33'; McLaughlin 58', (yellow card) 71'; Lewis 83'; Cargill (yellow card) 90'; Moriah-Welsh (yellow card) 90+2' | Stadium: Oakwell; Attendance: 12,856; Referee: Martin Coy |

| 29 December 2025 23 | Bolton Wanderers | 0–1 | Mansfield Town | Horwich |
| 19:45 GMT | Sheehan (yellow card) 58'; Cissoko (yellow card) 81' | Report | Hewitt (yellow card) 21'; Oates 43'; Moriah-Welsh (yellow card) 64'; Reed (yellow card) 84' | Stadium: Toughsheet Community Stadium; Attendance: 22,320 (1,306 Stags' fans); Referee: Peter Wright |

| 1 January 2026 24 | Mansfield Town | 3–0 | Bradford City | Mansfield |
| 15:00 GMT | Oates 22', 67'; Akins 37', (yellow card) 89'; Oshilaja (yellow card) 53' | | | Stadium: Field Mill; Attendance: 9,077; Referee: Ross Joyce |

| 17 January 2026 27 | Mansfield Town | 3–0 | Port Vale | Mansfield |
| 15:00 GMT | Cargill (yellow card) 41'; Irow 55', 67'; Evans 59'; Sweeney (yellow card) 70' | Report | | Stadium: Field Mill; Attendance: 8,364 (1,111 away fans); Referee: Abigail Byrne |

| 24 January 2026 28 | Stevenage | 1–1 | Mansfield Town | Stevenage |
| 15:00 GMT | Phillips (yellow card) 3'; Roberts (yellow card) 23'; Lubala (yellow card) 49'; Sweeney (yellow card) 90+2'; Campbell 90+6' | Report | Sweeney (yellow card) 51'; Akins 78' (pen.); Hendry (yellow card) 90+1' | Stadium: Broadhall Way; Attendance: 4,041 (967 away fans); Referee: Ben Atkinson |

| 27 January 2026 29 | Plymouth Argyle | 1–1 | Mansfield Town | Plymouth |
| 19:45 GMT | Edwards (yellow card) 16'; Pepple 20'; Sorinola (yellow card) 59' | Report | Sweeney 41'; Oshilaja (yellow card) 86'; Blake-Tracy (yellow card) 90+1' | Stadium: Home Park; Attendance: 14,131 (527 Stags supporters); Referee: Will Finnie |

| 31 January 2026 30 | Mansfield Town | 0–0 | Wycombe Wanderers | Mansfield |
| 15:00 GMT | | Report | Fink (yellow card) 90+1' | Stadium: Field Mill; Attendance: 7,401 (386 away fans); Referee: Benjamin Speedie |

| 7 February 2026 31 | Mansfield Town | 0–0 | Exeter City | Mansfield |
| 15:00 GMT | Oshilaja (yellow card) 20' | Report | Turns (yellow card) 62'; Sweeney (yellow card) 70'; Oakes (yellow card) 77'; Magennis (yellow card) 88' | Stadium: Field Mill; Attendance: 7,579 (291 away fans); Referee: Simon Mather |

| 10 February 2026 16 | Mansfield Town | 1–2 | Peterborough United | Mansfield |
| 19:45 GMT | Russell (yellow card) 31'; Abbott (yellow card) 71', (goal) 84' | Report | Morgan (yellow card) 51', (goal) 54'; Leonard 67'; Lisbie (yellow card) 90+5' | Stadium: Field Mill; Attendance: 7,167 (440 away supporters); Referee: Carl Brook |
Note: Fixture was originally scheduled for 15 November, but was postponed due to international call-ups.

| 17 February 2026 33 | Blackpool | 1–0 | Mansfield Town | Blackpool |
| 20:00 GMT | Ennis 34'; Brown (yellow card) 41'; Walters (yellow card) 41'; Peacock-Farrell (yellow card) 67'; Casey (yellow card) 85'; Anderson (yellow card) 89' | Report | | Stadium: Bloomfield Road; Attendance: 8,905 (894 Stags fans); Referee: Andrew Kitchen |
Note: Fixture was initially scheduled for a 19:45 kick-off, but was moved live Sky Sports broadcasting.

| 21 February 2026 34 | Mansfield Town | 0–2 | Lincoln City | Mansfield |
| 15:00 GMT | Knoyle (yellow card) 17'; Reed (yellow card) 90+6' | Report | Varfolomeyev (yellow card) 38'; Street 44' (pen.); Darikwa (yellow card) 77'; Bradley (yellow card) 82'; Bayliss 90+5' | Stadium: Field Mill; Attendance: 9,050 (1,649 away fans); Referee: David Rock |

| 28 February 2026 35 | Mansfield Town | 2–2 | AFC Wimbledon | Mansfield |
| 15:00 GMT | Russell 7', 29'; McLaughlin (yellow card) 54'; Oshilaja (yellow card) 90' | Report | Tilley 14'; Stevens 58' (pen.); Bugiel (yellow card) 90+4' | Stadium: Field Mill; Attendance: 7,693 (436 away fans); Referee: Sebastian Stockbridge |

| 3 March 2026 25 | Rotherham United | 0–0 | Mansfield Town | Rotherham |
| 19:45 GMT | Gray (yellow card) 46'; Jules (yellow card) 75' | Report | Hewitt (yellow card) 58' | Stadium: New York Stadium; Attendance: 9,243 (2,162 Stags fans); Referee: Scott Oldham |
Note: Fixture was originally scheduled for 4 January, but it was postponed due to a frozen pitch.

| 10 March 2026 26 | Mansfield Town | 1–0 | Reading | Mansfield |
| 19:45 GMT | Reed 69' | Report | Burns (yellow card) 19'; Wing (yellow card) 90+3' | Stadium: Field Mill; Attendance: 7,218 (310 away fans); Referee: Thomas Parsons |
Note: Fixture was originally scheduled for 10 January, but it was postponed due to FA Cup involvements.

| 14 March 2026 37 | Mansfield Town | 2–2 | Barnsley | Mansfield |
| 15:00 GMT | Akins 57' (pen.); McLaughlin 90+4' | Report | de Gevigney (yellow card) 7'; McGoldrick 19'; O'Keeffe (yellow card) 27'; Banks 49'; Kelly (yellow card) 68' | Stadium: Field Mill; Attendance: 8,538 (1,296 away fans); Referee: Martin Woods |

| 17 March 2026 38 | Bradford City | 1–1 | Mansfield Town | Bradford |
| 19:45 GMT | Pointon (yellow card) 37'; Tilt (yellow card) 59'; Wright 72'; Sarcevic (yellow card) 85'; Pennington (yellow card) 90+2' | Report | Adeboyejo 20'; Knoyle (yellow card) 31'; Russell (yellow card) 70' | Stadium: Valley Parade; Attendance: 19,716 (1,263 Stags fans); Referee: James Oldham |

| 21 March 2026 39 | Mansfield Town | 4–1 | Northampton Town | Mansfield |
| 15:00 GMT | Evans 5', 48'; Oshilaja (yellow card) 57'; Akins 62', 90+3' | Report | Perkins (yellow card) 11'; Willis (yellow card) 24'; Taylor (yellow card) 34'; McGeehan 73' | Stadium: Field Mill; Attendance: 7,624 (378 away fans); Referee: Matt Corlett |

| 3 April 2026 41 | Doncaster Rovers | 0–2 | Mansfield Town | Doncaster |
| 12:30 BST | Pearson (yellow card) 44'; McGrath (yellow card) 89' | Report | Oshilaja (yellow card) 26'; Oates 50'; Russell 70' | Stadium: Eco-Power Stadium; Attendance: 10,887 (2,814 Stags supporters); Referee: Lee Swabey |
Note: Fixture was initially scheduled for a 15:00 kick-off, but was brought forward after both clubs agreed to an earlier kick-off.

| 6 April 2026 42 | Mansfield Town | 0–0 | Burton Albion | Mansfield |
| 15:00 BST | Hendry (yellow card) 28'; Reed (yellow card) 38'; McLaughlin (yellow card) 52' | Report | Shade (yellow card) 61' | Stadium: Field Mill; Attendance: 8,049 (747 away fans); Referee: Matthew Russell |

| 11 April 2026 43 | Wigan Athletic | 2–1 | Mansfield Town | Wigan |
| 15:00 BST | Wright 25'; Taylor (yellow card) 43', (goal) 71' (pen.); Weir (yellow card) 74' | Report | Akins 28'; Sweeney (yellow card) 45+1' | Stadium: Brick Community Stadium; Attendance: 10,196 (1,482 Stags fans); Referee: Ollie Yates |

| 14 April 2026 32 | Leyton Orient | 0–0 | Mansfield Town | Leyton |
| 19:45 BST | | Report | Hewitt (yellow card) 80' | Stadium: Brisbane Road; Attendance: 7,941 (627 Stags fans); Referee: Ross Martin |
Note: Fixture was initially scheduled for 14 February, but was rearranged due to progression in the FA Cup.

| 18 April 2026 44 | Mansfield Town | 2–2 | Luton Town | Mansfield |
| 15:00 BST | Russell 21', 28'; Hewitt (yellow card) 66'; Dwyer (yellow card) 84' | Report | Palmer 40'; Morris 50'; Naismith (yellow card) 66' | Stadium: Field Mill; Attendance: 8,781 (1,350 away); Referee: Edward Duckworth |

| 21 April 2026 36 | Stockport County | 0–1 | Mansfield Town | Edgeley |
| 19:45 BST | Osborn (yellow card) 37'; Wootton (yellow card) 90+5' | Report | McLaughlin (yellow card) 42'; Knoyle (yellow card) 45'; Sweeney (yellow card) 49'; Roberts 63'; Evans (yellow card) 71'; Blake-Tracy (yellow card) 82' | Stadium: Edgeley Park; Attendance: 8,763 (839 Stags fans); Referee: Scott Jackson |
Note: Fixture was originally scheduled for 7 March, but was postponed due to FA Cup fifth round involvements.

| 25 April 2026 45 | Huddersfield Town | 1–4 | Mansfield Town | Huddersfield |
| 15:00 BST | Harness 60'; McGuane (yellow card) 90+3' | Report | Akins 15'; Russell (yellow card) 42'; Wallace 43' (o.g.); Hendry 51'; Irow (yellow card) 64', (goal) 65' | Stadium: Kirklees Stadium; Attendance: 17,843 (1,547 away fans); Referee: Ross Joyce |

| 28 April 2026 40 | Peterborough United | 0–0 | Mansfield Town | Peterborough |
| 19:45 BST | | Report | McLaughlin (yellow card) 76'; Hewitt (yellow card) 90+1' | Stadium: London Road Stadium; Attendance: 7,140 (858 Stags fans); Referee: Lewis Sandoe |
Note: Fixture was initially scheduled for 28 March, but was postponed due to international call-ups.

| 2 May 2026 46 | Mansfield Town | 5–4 | Cardiff City | Mansfield |
| 15:00 BST | Sweeney 2'; Akins 23', 26'; Oates 63'; Irow 79', (yellow card) 90+2'; Hendry (yellow card) 82' | Report | Davies 61'; Kellyman (yellow card) 65', (goal) 66', 90+3'; Kpakio 86' | Stadium: Field Mill; Attendance: 9,401 (1,554 Cardiff fans); Referee: Charles Breakspear |

=== FA Cup ===
Mansfield were drawn at home to Harrogate Town in the first round, away to Accrington Stanley in the second round, away to Sheffield United in the third round, away to Burnley in the fourth round and home to Arsenal in the fifth round.

Win Draw Loss Fixtures

| 1 November 2025 First round | Mansfield Town | 3–2 | Harrogate Town | Mansfield |
| 15:00 GMT | Hendry 4'; McDonnell (yellow card) 23'; Maris 67', 83' | Report | Duke-McKenna 57'; O'Connor 80', (yellow card) 81' | Stadium: Field Mill; Attendance: 3,301 (155 away fans); Referee: Wayne Cartmel |

| 6 December 2025 Second round | Accrington Stanley | 2–2 (1–3 p) | Mansfield Town | Accrington |
| 15:00 GMT | Heath 27'; Madden 102' | Report | Cargill (yellow card) 22'; Evans 53'; Reed (yellow card) 72'; Moriah-Welsh (yellow card) 76'; McLaughlin (yellow card) 90+1'; McAdam 105+2' | Stadium: Crown Ground; Attendance: 1,873 (861 Stags fans); Referee: Stephen Parkinson |
| | Penalties |
| | Bauress (penalty missed); Brown (penalty scored); Ward (penalty missed); Heath (penalty missed) | | Akins (penalty scored); Oshilaja (penalty scored); Reed (penalty scored) |

| 11 January 2026 Third round | Sheffield United | 3–4 | Mansfield Town | Sheffield |
| 14:30 GMT | Hamer 20'; Soumaré (yellow card) 54'; Bamford 61'; Moriah-Welsh 65' (o.g.); Campbell (yellow card) 73' | Report | Reed 13', 44'; Akins 50'; Oates 57'; Oshilaja (yellow card) 89' | Stadium: Bramall Lane; Attendance: 17,514; Referee: Gavin Ward |

| 14 February 2026 Fourth round | Burnley | 1–2 | Mansfield Town | Burnley |
| 15:00 GMT | Laurent 21' | Report | Oates 53'; Reed 80' | Stadium: Turf Moor; Attendance: 11,914; Referee: Gavin Ward |

| 7 March 2026 Fifth round | Mansfield Town | 1–2 | Arsenal | Mansfield |
| 12:15 GMT | Evans 50'; Reed (yellow card) 60'; Akins (yellow card) 77'; McLaughlin (yellow card) 80'; Lewis (yellow card) 90+2' | Report | Madueke 41'; Eze 66', (yellow card) 74'; Calafiori (yellow card) 70' | Stadium: Field Mill; Attendance: 9,260; Referee: Thomas Bramall |

=== EFL Cup ===
Mansfield were drawn away to Chesterfield in the first round and to Everton in the second round.

Win Draw Loss Fixtures

| 12 August 2025 First round | Chesterfield | 0–2 | Mansfield Town | Chesterfield |
| 19:45 BST | Naylor (yellow card) 73' | Report | Bowery (yellow card) 1'; Oates 2'; Cargill (yellow card) 45'; Lewis (yellow card) 53'; Evans 59'; McDonnell (yellow card) 88' | Stadium: SMH Group Stadium; Attendance: 9,502 (1,061 Stags fans); Referee: Adam Herczeg |

| 27 August 2025 Second round | Everton | 2–0 | Mansfield Town | Vauxhall |
| 19:45 BST | Alcaraz 51'; Beto 89' | Report | | Stadium: Hill Dickinson Stadium; Attendance: 48,583 (6,039 away fans); Referee: Thomas Bramall |

=== EFL Trophy ===
Mansfield were drawn against Harrogate Town, Huddersfield Town and Newcastle United U21 in the group stage.

| Pos | Div | Team | Pld | W | PW | PL | L | GF | GA | GD | Pts | Qualification |
|---|---|---|---|---|---|---|---|---|---|---|---|---|
| 1 | L2 | Harrogate Town | 3 | 3 | 0 | 0 | 0 | 5 | 1 | +4 | 9 | Advance to Round 2 |
| 2 | L1 | Huddersfield Town | 3 | 2 | 0 | 0 | 1 | 9 | 4 | +5 | 6 | Advance to Round 2 |
| 3 | ACA | Newcastle United U21 | 3 | 0 | 1 | 0 | 2 | 5 | 11 | −6 | 2 | |
| 4 | L1 | Mansfield Town | 3 | 0 | 0 | 1 | 2 | 3 | 6 | −3 | 1 | |

Source: EFL

Win Draw Loss Fixtures

| 9 September 2025 North Group F | Mansfield Town | 0–1 | Harrogate Town | Mansfield |
| 19:45 BST | | Report | Bennett 2' (pen.); Evans (yellow card) 31'; Faulkner (yellow card) 51'; Hill (yellow card) 90+7' | Stadium: Field Mill; Attendance: 1,275 (59 Harrogate fans); Referee: Peter Wright |

| 15 October 2025 North Group F | Mansfield Town | 2–2 (5–7 p) | Newcastle United U21 | Mansfield |
| 19:45 BST | Dickov 24'; Bowery (yellow card) 58'; Flanagan 67'; Taylor (yellow card) 90+1' | Report | Heffernan 4'; Taylor (yellow card) 55'; McArthur (yellow card) 61'; Taylor 90+2' (o.g.) | Stadium: Field Mill; Attendance: 1,180 (88 away fans); Referee: Andrew Humphries |

| 4 November 2025 North Group F | Huddersfield Town | 3–1 | Mansfield Town | Huddersfield |
| 19:45 GMT | Charles 3', 84'; Feeney 34' | Report | Dwyer 46' | Stadium: Kirklees Stadium; Attendance: 973 (135 Stags' supporters); Referee: Paul Howard |

== Statistics ==
=== Appearances and goals ===
Players with no appearances are not included on the list; italics indicate loaned in player

| No. | Pos | Nat | Player | Total | | League One | | FA Cup | | EFL Cup | | EFL Trophy | |
| No. | Pos | Nat | Player | Apps | Goals | Apps | Goals | Apps | Goals | Apps | Goals | Apps | Goals |
|---|---|---|---|---|---|---|---|---|---|---|---|---|---|
| 1 | GK | (England) ENG | Liam Roberts | 48 | 0 | 42+0 | 0 | 4+0 | 0 | 2+0 | 0 | 0+0 | 0 |
| 2 | DF | (England) ENG | Kyle Knoyle | 35 | 0 | 28+3 | 0 | 3+0 | 0 | 1+0 | 0 | 0+0 | 0 |
| 3 | DF | (Republic of Ireland) IRL | Stephen McLaughlin | 50 | 3 | 23+18 | 3 | 4+1 | 0 | 0+2 | 0 | 1+1 | 0 |
| 4 | DF | (Wales) WAL | Elliott Hewitt | 33 | 0 | 16+11 | 0 | 0+3 | 0 | 0+2 | 0 | 1+0 | 0 |
| 5 | DF | (Republic of Ireland) IRL | Ryan Sweeney | 39 | 2 | 24+7 | 2 | 2+1 | 0 | 1+1 | 0 | 3+0 | 0 |
| 6 | DF | (England) ENG | Baily Cargill | 24 | 1 | 18+2 | 1 | 2+0 | 0 | 2+0 | 0 | 0+0 | 0 |
| 7 | FW | (Grenada) GRN | Lucas Akins | 34 | 10 | 23+4 | 9 | 3+2 | 1 | 0+0 | 0 | 2+0 | 0 |
| 8 | MF | (Wales) WAL | Aaron Lewis | 43 | 1 | 22+13 | 1 | 2+2 | 0 | 1+0 | 0 | 1+2 | 0 |
| 9 | DF | (England) ENG | Jordan Bowery | 22 | 1 | 9+8 | 1 | 0+1 | 0 | 2+0 | 0 | 2+0 | 0 |
| 10 | MF | (England) ENG | George Maris | 16 | 2 | 4+6 | 0 | 0+1 | 2 | 1+1 | 0 | 2+1 | 0 |
| 11 | FW | (Wales) WAL | Will Evans | 52 | 11 | 35+10 | 8 | 2+2 | 2 | 1+1 | 1 | 0+1 | 0 |
| 12 | GK | (Republic of Ireland) IRL | Owen Mason | 4 | 0 | 0+0 | 0 | 1+0 | 0 | 0+0 | 0 | 3+0 | 0 |
| 13 | MF | (Jamaica) JAM | Jon Russell | 24 | 5 | 17+4 | 5 | 2+1 | 0 | 0+0 | 0 | 0+0 | 0 |
| 14 | FW | (United States) USA | Dom Dwyer | 20 | 2 | 1+14 | 1 | 0+1 | 0 | 1+0 | 0 | 3+0 | 1 |
| 15 | MF | (Northern Ireland) NIR | Jamie McDonnell | 25 | 2 | 19+0 | 2 | 3+0 | 0 | 1+1 | 0 | 1+0 | 0 |
| 17 | FW | (England) ENG | Max Dickov | 19 | 1 | 5+9 | 0 | 1+0 | 0 | 1+0 | 0 | 3+0 | 1 |
| 18 | FW | (England) ENG | Rhys Oates | 43 | 11 | 23+13 | 8 | 5+0 | 2 | 1+0 | 1 | 0+1 | 0 |
| 19 | FW | (Nigeria) NGR | Victor Adeboyejo | 17 | 1 | 7+7 | 1 | 0+3 | 0 | 0+0 | 0 | 0+0 | 0 |
| 20 | DF | (England) ENG | Frazer Blake-Tracy | 50 | 1 | 37+3 | 1 | 5+0 | 0 | 2+0 | 0 | 0+3 | 0 |
| 21 | GK | (England) ENG | Harry Lewis | 3 | 0 | 3+0 | 0 | 0+0 | 0 | 0+0 | 0 | 0+0 | 0 |
| 22 | MF | (Guyana) GUY | Nathan Moriah-Welsh | 49 | 1 | 22+19 | 1 | 3+0 | 0 | 2+0 | 0 | 1+2 | 0 |
| 23 | DF | (England) ENG | Deji Oshilaja | 39 | 0 | 34+0 | 0 | 5+0 | 0 | 0+0 | 0 | 0+0 | 0 |
| 24 | MF | (Scotland) SCO | Regan Hendry | 35 | 4 | 19+12 | 3 | 1+1 | 1 | 1+1 | 0 | 0+0 | 0 |
| 25 | MF | (England) ENG | Louis Reed | 41 | 5 | 33+1 | 2 | 4+1 | 3 | 1+0 | 0 | 1+0 | 0 |
| 27 | DF | (England) ENG | Luke Bolton | 18 | 1 | 8+8 | 1 | 0+1 | 0 | 0+1 | 0 | 0+0 | 0 |
| 28 | FW | (Republic of Ireland) IRL | Joe Gardner | 17 | 1 | 5+9 | 1 | 1+0 | 0 | 0+0 | 0 | 2+0 | 0 |
| 29 | FW | (Wales) WAL | Tyler Roberts | 20 | 4 | 13+6 | 4 | 1+0 | 0 | 0+0 | 0 | 0+0 | 0 |
| 30 | MF | (England) ENG | Finn Flanagan | 3 | 1 | 0+0 | 0 | 0+0 | 0 | 0+0 | 0 | 2+1 | 1 |
| 32 | DF | (England) ENG | Elliot Hartmann | 2 | 0 | 0+2 | 0 | 0+0 | 0 | 0+0 | 0 | 0+0 | 0 |
| 33 | DF | (England) ENG | Taylor Anderson | 3 | 0 | 0+1 | 0 | 0+0 | 0 | 0+0 | 0 | 2+0 | 0 |
| 34 | MF | (England) ENG | Oliver Taylor | 7 | 0 | 0+4 | 0 | 0+1 | 0 | 0+0 | 0 | 0+2 | 0 |
| 36 | FW | (England) ENG | Jack Goodman | 1 | 0 | 0+0 | 0 | 0+0 | 0 | 0+0 | 0 | 0+1 | 0 |
| 39 | GK | (Dominican Republic) DOM | Anthony Núñez | 1 | 0 | 1+0 | 0 | 0+0 | 0 | 0+0 | 0 | 0+0 | 0 |
| 40 | MF | (England) ENG | George Abbott | 11 | 1 | 6+4 | 1 | 1+0 | 0 | 0+0 | 0 | 0+0 | 0 |
| 44 | FW | (England) ENG | Oliver Irow | 18 | 4 | 7+10 | 4 | 0+1 | 0 | 0+0 | 0 | 0+0 | 0 |
Player(s) who featured but departed the club during the season:
| 21 | MF | (England) ENG | Kyle McAdam | 15 | 1 | 3+7 | 0 | 0+1 | 1 | 1+0 | 0 | 3+0 | 0 |
