= Luke Bolton =

English footballer (born 1999)

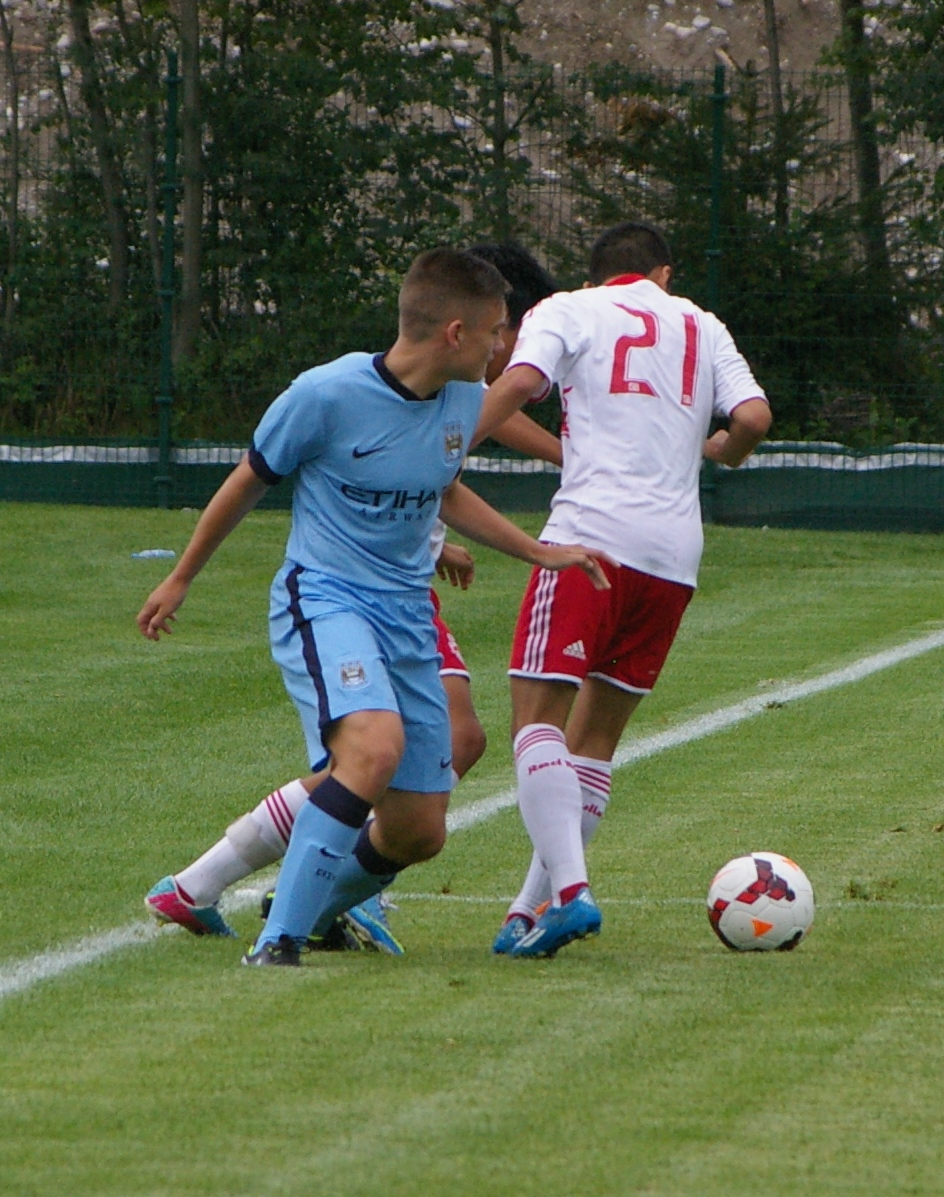
- Luke Bolton playing for Manchester City in 2014.

Personal information
- Full name: Luke Philip Bolton
- Date of birth: 7 October 1999 (age 27)
- Place of birth: Stockport, England
- Height: 5 ft 9 in (1.76 m)
- Positions: Winger; full-back

Team information
- Current team: Mansfield Town
- Number: 8

Youth career
- –2018: Manchester City

Senior career*
Years	Team	Apps	(Gls)
2018–2022	Manchester City	0	(0)
2019	→ Wycombe Wanderers (loan)	10	(0)
2019–2020	→ Luton Town (loan)	24	(0)
2020–2021	→ Dundee United (loan)	24	(1)
2022–2024	Salford City	78	(6)
2024–2025	Wrexham	17	(0)
2025–	Mansfield Town	25	(1)

International career^{‡}
2019	England U20	5	(0)
- * Club domestic league appearances and goals as of 12:07, 22 November 2026 (UTC) ‡ National team caps and goals as of 21:51, 20 November 2019 (UTC)

Luke Philip Bolton (born 7 October 1999) is an English professional footballer who plays as a winger and full-back for EFL League One club Mansfield Town.

Bolton began his career with Manchester City, and spent time on loan at Wycombe Wanderers (where he made his professional debut, Luton Town, and Scottish club Dundee United. He later played with Salford City, Wrexham, and Mansfield Town

== Club career ==
=== Manchester City ===
Born in Stockport, Bolton played in the 2018–19 EFL Trophy for Manchester City U21 against Barnsley and Rochdale, and was named in Manchester City's Champions League squad. He was an unused substitute for City's EFL Cup semi-final second leg against Burton Albion on 23 January 2019, and the following day joined League One club Wycombe Wanderers on loan until the end of the season. He made his Football League debut on 26 January as a second-half substitute in a 1–0 home win against Plymouth Argyle.

Bolton joined Luton Town on loan for the 2019–20 season. He was then loaned to Scottish Premiership club Dundee United for the 2020–21 season. Bolton's first senior goal came during his spell in Scotland, scoring a last-minute equaliser in a 1–1 draw with Hibernian on 19 December.

=== Salford City ===
Bolton signed permanently for EFL League Two team Salford City in January 2022, signing a contract until June 2024. He explained his reason to sign for Salford was to play men's football consistently. He made his debut for the club on 8 February as an 80th minute substitute in a league match against Sutton United.

=== Wrexham ===
On 1 February 2024, Bolton joined League Two rivals Wrexham on a two-and-a-half-year deal for an undisclosed fee.

=== Mansfield Town ===
On 19 July 2025, Bolton joined League One side Mansfield Town on a two-year deal.

== International career ==
He has represented England at under-20 level, and was a member of the squad that won the 2017 Toulon Tournament.

== Playing style ==
During his time with Luton he played primarily as a full back rather than his usual position as a winger.

== Career statistics ==
As of match played 21 November 2026

Appearances and goals by club, season and competition
Club	Season	League			National cup (Note: Includes FA Cup, Scottish Cup)		League cup (Note: Includes EFL Cup, Scottish League Cup)		Other		Total	
Club	Season	Division	Apps	Goals	Apps	Goals	Apps	Goals	Apps	Goals	Apps	Goals
Manchester City U21	2018–19	—			—		—		2 (Note: Appearances in EFL Trophy)	1	2	1
Manchester City	2018–19	Premier League	0	0	0	0	0	0	0	0	0	0
Manchester City	2019–20	Premier League	0	0	0	0	0	0	0	0	0	0
Manchester City	2020–21	Premier League	0	0	0	0	0	0	0	0	0	0
Manchester City	2021–22	Premier League	0	0	0	0	0	0	0	0	0	0
Manchester City	Total		0	0	0	0	0	0	0	0	0	0
Wycombe Wanderers (loan)	2018–19	League One	10	0	—		—		—		10	0
Luton Town (loan)	2019–20	Championship	24	0	1	0	3	0	—		28	0
Dundee United (loan)	2020–21	Scottish Premiership	24	1	2	0	4	0	—		30	1
Salford City	2021–22	League Two	15	0	0	0	0	0	0	0	15	0
Salford City	2022–23	League Two	46	6	2	0	1	0	7 (Note: Five appearances in EFL Trophy, two appearances in League Two play-offs)	0	56	6
Salford City	2023–24	League Two	20	0	0	0	2	0	1	0	23	0
Salford City	Total		81	6	2	0	3	0	8	0	94	6
Wrexham	2023–24	League Two	17	0	0	0	0	0	0	0	17	0
Wrexham	2024–25	League One	0	0	0	0	1	0	2	0	3	0
Wrexham	Total		17	0	0	0	1	0	2	0	20	0
Mansfield Town	2025–26	League One	16	1	1	0	1	0	0	0	18	1
Mansfield Town	2026–27	League One	9	0	0	0	0	0	2	0	11	0
Mansfield Town	Total		25	1	1	0	1	0	2	0	29	1
Career Total			181	8	6	0	12	0	14	1	213	9

== Honours ==
Wrexham

- EFL League Two runner-up: 2023–24

England U20

- Toulon Tournament: 2017
