= Jordan Bowery =

Kittitian footballer (born 1991)

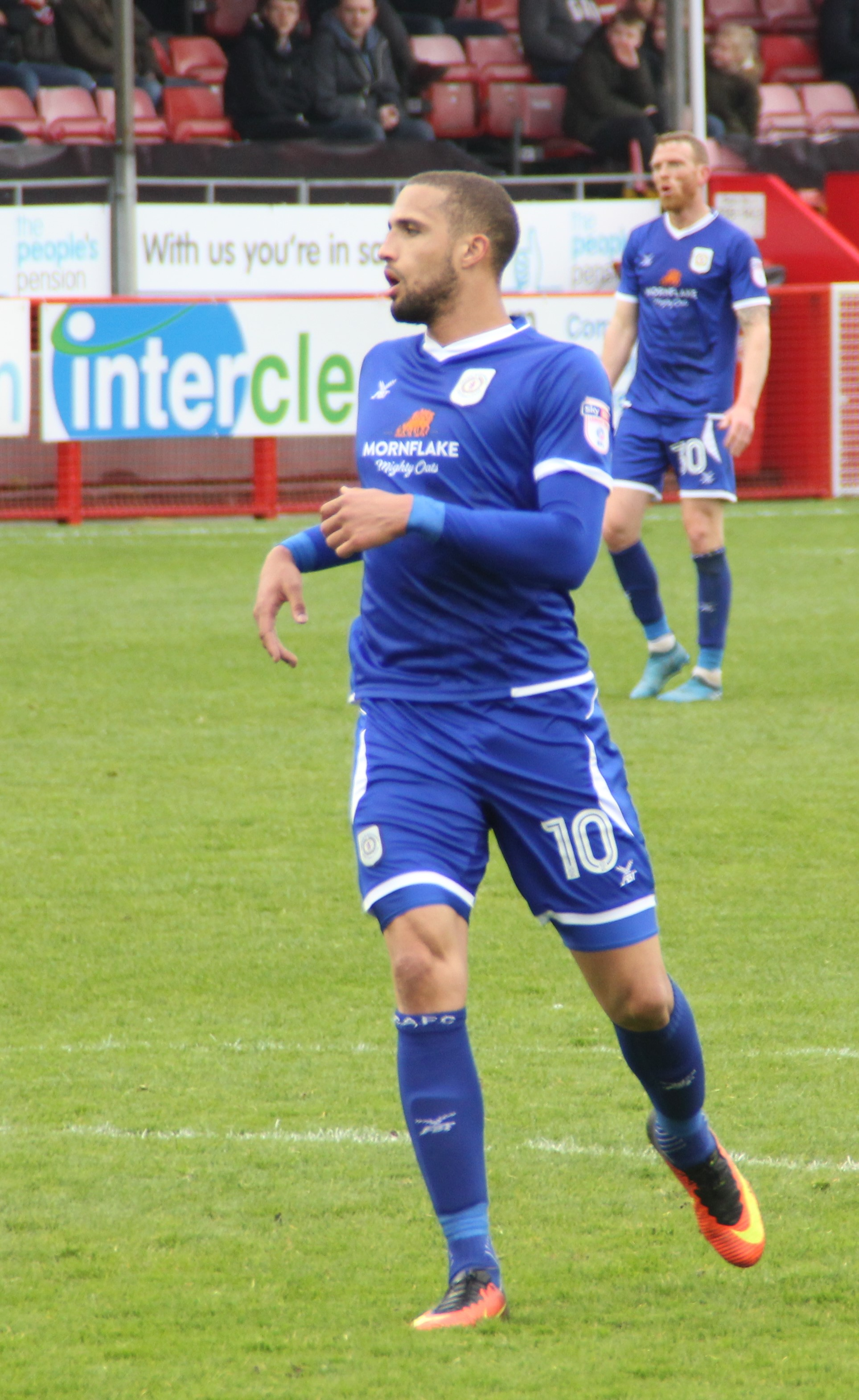
- Bowery playing for Crewe Alexandra in 2018

Personal information
- Full name: Jordan Nathaniel Bowery
- Date of birth: 2 July 1991 (age 35)
- Place of birth: Nottingham, England
- Height: 6 ft 1 in (1.85 m)
- Positions: Forward; defender

Team information
- Current team: Mansfield Town
- Number: 9

Youth career
- Derby County
- 2007–2008: Chesterfield

Senior career*
Years	Team	Apps	(Gls)
2008–2012	Chesterfield	83	(10)
2009–2010	→ Barrow (loan)	4	(0)
2012–2014	Aston Villa	19	(0)
2014	→ Doncaster Rovers (loan)	3	(0)
2014–2016	Rotherham United	40	(5)
2015	→ Bradford City (loan)	3	(0)
2016	Oxford United	17	(7)
2016–2017	Leyton Orient	17	(1)
2017	→ Crewe Alexandra (loan)	19	(2)
2017–2019	Crewe Alexandra	89	(20)
2019–2020	Milton Keynes Dons	16	(2)
2020–	Mansfield Town	231	(26)

International career^{‡}
2025–	Saint Kitts and Nevis	8	(0)
- * Club domestic league appearances and goals as of 12:08, 22 November 2026 (UTC) ‡ National team caps and goals as of 17 November 2026

Jordan Nathaniel Bowery (born 2 July 1991) is a professional footballer who plays as a forward and defender for EFL League One club Mansfield Town.

Bowery has previously played for Crewe Alexandra, Chesterfield, Rotherham United, Aston Villa, Leyton Orient, Oxford United, Milton Keynes Dons, Barrow, Bradford City and Doncaster Rovers.

Born in England, Bowery represents the Saint Kitts and Nevis national team, making his international debut in 2025.

== Career ==
=== Chesterfield ===
Born in Nottingham, Bowery represented Derby County as a schoolboy but was not signed as a scholar and eventually moved on to Chesterfield. Bowery made his professional debut for Chesterfield on 30 August 2008, in a 1–0 defeat against Wycombe Wanderers. On 19 November 2009, Bowery joined Conference Premier club Barrow on loan for six weeks. Bowery scored his first goal in the Football League on 29 January 2011, in a 2–2 home draw against Bradford City. On 15 September 2011, Bowery signed a contract extension to keep him at the club until June 2014.

=== Aston Villa ===
Bowery signed for Aston Villa on 31 August 2012. He signed on loan for Doncaster Rovers in February 2014.

=== Rotherham United ===
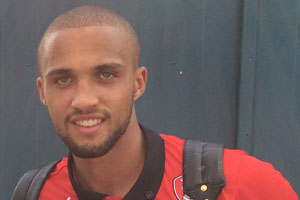
Bowery whilst with Rotherham United.

On 10 June 2014, Bowery joined Rotherham United for an undisclosed fee, breaking the Millers' transfer record of £160,000 for Lee Frecklington in January 2013. He signed on loan for Bradford City in November 2015. He left Rotherham by mutual consent in January 2016.

=== Oxford United ===
On 22 January, Bowery joined Oxford United on a deal until the end of the season. He scored 7 league goals in 9 starts and 8 substitute appearances and was part of the team that won promotion to League One, finishing second in League Two.

=== Leyton Orient ===
On 5 July 2016, Bowery joined Leyton Orient on a two-year deal upon his release from Oxford United.

=== Crewe Alexandra ===
He moved to Crewe Alexandra on loan in January 2017, and scored his first Crewe goal on 14 March at Crawley Town. On 9 May 2017, Crewe announced that Bowery would be returning to his parent club, however two weeks later on 23 May, Crewe announced that Bowery had signed a two-year contract with the club, as his Leyton Orient contract included a relegation release clause which allowed him to leave. After scoring 22 times in 99 games over two seasons, he was offered a new contract by Crewe at the end of the 2018–19 season, but declined to extend his stay at Gresty Road.

=== Milton Keynes Dons ===
On 11 June 2019, it was announced that Bowery would join newly promoted League One club Milton Keynes Dons on a free transfer effective from 1 July 2019. He scored his first goal for the club in a 3–2 defeat away to Wycombe Wanderers.

=== Mansfield Town ===
On 22 June 2020 it was announced that he would join Mansfield Town on 1 August 2020, after signing on a free transfer. Following defeat in the 2022 EFL League Two play-off final, Bowery signed a new two-year contract.

On 29 May 2025, the club announced he had signed a new one-year contract. On 19 May 2026, Mansfield said the player had signed a contract extension.

== Playing style ==
Playing as a forward for most of his career, Bowery began playing as a defender for Mansfield in the 2022–23 season. He played at both centre back and right back, and he said he appreciated the "trust" placed in him by Mansfield manager Nigel Clough. He was later described as a "versatile" player. Playing primarily as a defender from that time, Bowery returned to playing as a forward in November 2023 due to an injury to striker Lucas Akins.

== International career ==
Born in England, Thomas is of Kittitian descent through his father, the former footballer Bert, who was born in the Caribbean country.

Bowery was called up to the Saint Kitts and Nevis national team on 2 June 2025 and made his debut in a 2026 FIFA World Cup qualifier against Trinidad and Tobago.

== Personal life ==
Bowery's father, Bert, was also a professional footballer who played in England and the United States.

== Career statistics ==
As of match played 21 November 2026.

Appearances and goals by club, season and competition
Club	Season	League			FA Cup		League Cup		Other		Total	
Club	Season	Division	Apps	Goals	Apps	Goals	Apps	Goals	Apps	Goals	Apps	Goals
Chesterfield	2008–09	League Two	3	0	2	0	0	0	0	0	5	0
Chesterfield	2009–10	League Two	10	0	1	0	1	0	2 (Note: Appearances in EFL Trophy.)	1	14	1
Chesterfield	2010–11	League Two	27	1	2	1	0	0	2	1	31	3
Chesterfield	2011–12	League One	40	8	1	1	1	0	6	3	48	12
Chesterfield	2012–13	League Two	3	1	0	0	1	0	0	0	4	1
Chesterfield	Total		83	10	6	2	3	0	10	5	102	17
Barrow (loan)	2009–10	Conference Premier	4	0	—		—		—		4	0
Aston Villa	2012–13	Premier League	10	0	2	0	0	0	—		12	0
Aston Villa	2013–14	Premier League	9	0	0	0	1	0	—		10	0
Aston Villa	Total		19	0	2	0	1	0	0	0	22	0
Doncaster Rovers (loan)	2013–14	Championship	3	0	0	0	—		—		3	0
Rotherham United	2014–15	Championship	33	5	1	0	2	0	—		36	5
Rotherham United	2015–16	Championship	7	0	0	0	1	1	—		8	1
Rotherham United	Total		40	5	1	0	3	1	0	0	44	6
Bradford City (loan)	2015–16	League One	3	0	0	0	0	0	0	0	3	0
Oxford United	2015–16	League Two	17	7	1	0	—		2	0	20	7
Leyton Orient	2016–17	League Two	17	1	1	0	0	0	2	0	20	1
Crewe Alexandra (loan)	2016–17	League Two	19	2	—		—		—		19	2
Crewe Alexandra	2017–18	League Two	45	12	3	0	1	0	2	1	51	13
Crewe Alexandra	2018–19	League Two	44	8	1	0	1	0	2	1	48	9
Crewe Alexandra	Total		89	20	4	0	2	0	4	2	99	22
Milton Keynes Dons	2019–20	League One	16	2	1	0	3	0	2	0	22	2
Mansfield Town	2020–21	League Two	43	10	3	0	0	0	1	0	47	10
Mansfield Town	2021–22	League Two	40	8	3	0	1	0	5	1	49	9
Mansfield Town	2022–23	League Two	38	4	1	0	1	0	4	0	44	4
Mansfield Town	2023–24	League Two	44	2	1	0	4	0	3	0	52	2
Mansfield Town	2024–25	League One	44	1	3	0	1	0	2	0	50	1
Mansfield Town	2025–26	League One	17	1	1	0	2	0	2	0	22	1
Mansfield Town	2026–27	League One	5	0	1	1	0	0	0	0	6	1
Mansfield Town	Total		231	26	13	1	9	0	17	1	270	28
Career total			541	73	29	3	21	1	37	8	628	85

== Honours ==
Chesterfield

- Football League Two: 2010–11
- Football League Trophy: 2011–12

Oxford United

- Football League Two second-place promotion: 2015–16
- Football League Trophy runner-up: 2015–16

Mansfield Town

- EFL League Two third-place promotion: 2023–24
