= George Abbott (footballer, born August 2005) =

English footballer (born 2005)

Personal information
- Full name: George Benedict Abbott
- Date of birth: 17 August 2005 (age 21)
- Place of birth: Islington, England
- Height: 1.75 m (5 ft 9 in)
- Position: Midfielder

Team information
- Current team: Mansfield Town (on loan from Tottenham Hotspur)
- Number: 33

Youth career
- 2012–2023: Tottenham Hotspur

Senior career*
Years	Team	Apps	(Gls)
2023–	Tottenham Hotspur	1	(0)
2024–2025	→ Notts County (loan)	42	(5)
2025	→ Wycombe Wanderers (loan)	11	(1)
2026–	→ Mansfield Town (loan)	10	(1)

International career^{‡}
2023	England U18	3	(0)
2024	England U19	2	(0)
- * Club domestic league appearances and goals as of 20:01, 2 September 2026 (UTC)~ ‡ National team caps and goals as of 19:24, 28 May 2023 (UTC)

George Benedict Abbott (born 17 August 2005) is an English professional footballer who plays for EFL League One club Mansfield Town, on loan from Premier League club Tottenham Hotspur.

== Club career ==
A youth product of Tottenham Hotspur since the age of seven, Abbott worked his way up through their youth categories. He signed his first professional contract with the club on 15 March 2023. He made his senior and professional debut with Tottenham Hotspur when he came on as a late substitute in a 4–1 Premier League win over Leeds United on 28 May 2023.

In the 2023–24 season, Abbott captained Tottenham Hotspur U21 to the Premier League 2 title.

On 29 August 2024, Abbott joined Notts County on a season-long loan. His goal in a match against Accrington Stanley won the EFL Goal of the Month award for January 2025 and was later voted the EFL Goal of the Season.

On 27 July 2025, the club announced that Abbott had signed a new contract.

On 6 August 2025, Abbott joined League One side Wycombe Wanderers on a season long loan. On 6 January 2026, he was recalled from his loan and returned to Tottenham.

On 2 February 2026, Abbott joined League One side Mansfield Town on loan until the end of the 2025–26 season. Abbott rejoined Mansfield Town on loan on 1 September for the 2026–27 season.

== International career ==
Abbott is a youth international for England, having played for the England U18s.

== Playing style ==
Abbott is a versatile player who is primarily a defensive midfielder. He also played along the backline, and broke out in the 2022–23 season as a right-back.

== Career statistics ==
=== Club ===
As of match played 6 April 2026

Appearances and goals by club, season and competition
Club	Season	League			National cup		League cup		Continental		Other		Total	
Club	Season	Division	Apps	Goals	Apps	Goals	Apps	Goals	Apps	Goals	Apps	Goals	Apps	Goals
Tottenham Hotspur U21	2022–23	—			—		—		—		1 (Note: Appearance(s) in the EFL Trophy)	0	1	0
Tottenham Hotspur U21	2023–24	—			—		—		—		2	0	2	0
Tottenham Hotspur U21	2024–25	—			—		—		—		1	0	1	0
Tottenham Hotspur	2022–23	Premier League	1	0	0	0	0	0	0	0	—		1	0
Notts County (loan)	2024–25	League Two	40	5	2	1	0	0	—		2 (Note: 2 appearances in the EFL League Two play-offs)	0	44	6
Wycombe Wanderers (loan)	2025–26	League One	11	1	0	0	0	0	—		3	0	14	1
Mansfield Town (loan)	2025–26	League One	10	1	1	0	—		—		—		11	1
Mansfield Town (loan)	2026–27	League One	0	0	—		—		—		0	0	0	0
Mansfield Town (loan)	Total		10	1	1	1	0	0	0	0	9	0	11	1
Career total			62	7	3	1	0	0	0	0	9	0	74	8

== Honours ==
Individual

- PFA Team of the Year: 2024–25 League Two
- EFL Goal of the Year: 2024–25
