= Finn Flanagan =

English association football player

Personal information
- Full name: Finn Frank Flanagan
- Date of birth: 18 May 2005 (age 21)
- Place of birth: Nottingham, England
- Height: 1.86 m (6 ft 1 in)
- Position: Midfielder

Team information
- Current team: Portadown (on loan from Mansfield Town)

Youth career
- 2015–2021: Derby County
- 2021–2023: Mansfield Town

Senior career*
Years	Team	Apps	(Gls)
2023–	Mansfield Town	7	(1)
2024–2025	→ Rushall Olympic (loan)	2	(0)
2025	→ Redditch United (loan)	3	(0)
2025	→ Mickleover (loan)	3	(0)
2025	→ Rugby Town (loan)	4	(0)
2025–2026	→ Matlock Town (loan)	8	(1)
2026–	→ Quorn (loan)	9	(0)
2026	→ Portadown (loan)	7	(0)
- * Club domestic league appearances and goals as of 20:19, 10 February 2026 (UTC)

Finn Frank Flanagan is an English professional footballer who plays as a midfielder for Portadown FC, on loan from EFL League One club Mansfield Town.

== Career ==
Flanagan joined the academy of Derby County at the age of 10.

He joined the Mansfield Town academy in January 2021 and signed his first professional contract with the club in May 2023. On 10 October 2023, Flanagan made his professional debut, coming on as a late substitute for Calum Macdonald in a 3–2 victory over Doncaster Rovers. He then went on to make 1 more appearance in the EFL Trophy, along with three games as an unused substitute in other competitions.

On 6 December 2024, Flanagan joined Rushall Olympic on a one-month youth loan.

On 14 January 2025, Flanagan joined Redditch United on a one-month loan.

Flanagan joined Mickleover on loan in February 2025.

On 27 March 2025, Flanagan joined Rugby Town on loan until the end of the season.

Flanagan joined Matlock Town on loan in November 2025.

On 31 January 2026, Quorn announced the signing of Flanagan on loan.

On 14 August 2026, Flanagan signed for Portadown on a season long loan for the 26/27 season

== Personal life ==
Flanagan was born in Nottingham. He is eligible to represent both England and the Republic of Ireland at international level through his grandparents, who are from Portlaoise.

== Career statistics ==
As of match played 28 March 2026

Appearances and goals by club, season and competition
Club	Season	League			FA Cup		League Cup		Other		Total	
Club	Season	Division	Apps	Goals	Apps	Goals	Apps	Goals	Apps	Goals	Apps	Goals
Mansfield Town	2023–24	League Two	0	0	0	0	0	0	2 (Note: Appearance(s) in EFL Trophy)	0	2	0
Mansfield Town	2024–25	League One	0	0	0	0	0	0	2	0	2	0
Mansfield Town	2025–26	League One	0	0	0	0	0	0	3	1	3	1
Mansfield Town	Total		0	0	0	0	0	0	7	1	7	1
Rushall Olympic (loan)	2024–25	National League North	2	0	0	0	–		1 (Note: Appearance(s) in FA Trophy)	0	3	0
Redditch United (loan)	2024–25	Southern League Premier Division Central	3	0	0	0	–		1 (Note: Appearances in Birmingham Senior Cup)	0	4	0
Mickleover (loan)	2024–25	Northern Premier League Premier Division	3	0	0	0	–		0	0	3	0
Rugby Town (loan)	2024–25	Northern Premier League Division One Midlands	4	0	0	0	–		0	0	4	0
Matlock Town (loan)	2025–26	Northern Premier League Division One East	6	1	0	0	—		1 (Note: Appearance(s) in Derbyshire Senior Cup)	0	7	1
Quorn (loan)	2025–26	Southern League Premier Division Central	8	0	0	0	—		1 (Note: Appearance(s) in Leicestershire and Rutland Senior Cup)	0	9	0
Career total			26	1	0	0	0	0	11	1	37	2
