= Tyler Roberts =

Welsh international footballer (born 1999)

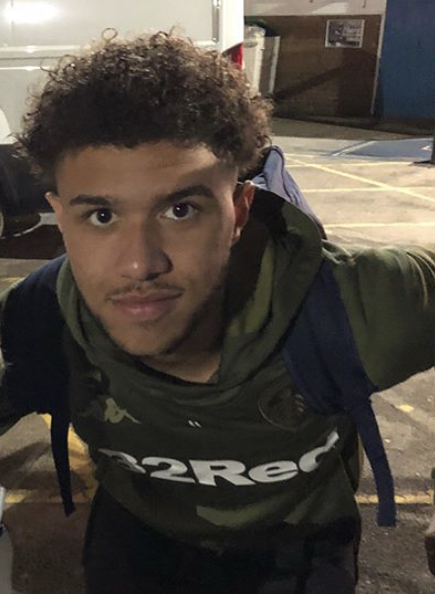
- Roberts in 2019

Personal information
- Full name: Tyler D'Whyte Roberts
- Date of birth: 12 January 1999 (age 27)
- Place of birth: Gloucester, England
- Height: 5 ft 11 in (1.80 m)
- Positions: Forward; attacking midfielder

Team information
- Current team: Mansfield Town
- Number: 19

Youth career
- 2006–2016: West Bromwich Albion

Senior career*
Years	Team	Apps	(Gls)
2016–2018	West Bromwich Albion	1	(0)
2016–2017	→ Oxford United (loan)	14	(0)
2017	→ Shrewsbury Town (loan)	13	(4)
2017–2018	→ Walsall (loan)	17	(5)
2018–2023	Leeds United	101	(9)
2022–2023	→ Queens Park Rangers (loan)	18	(3)
2023–2026	Birmingham City	17	(0)
2024–2025	→ Northampton Town (loan)	27	(1)
2025–2026	→ Mansfield Town (loan)	9	(3)
2026–	Mansfield Town	10	(1)

International career^{‡}
2015–2016	Wales U17	8	(2)
2015–2016	Wales U19	6	(1)
2016–2017	Wales U20	2	(0)
2017–2018	Wales U21	5	(1)
2018–	Wales	20	(0)
- * Club domestic league appearances and goals as of 2 May 2026 (UTC) ‡ National team caps and goals as of 03:14, 9 March 2026 (UTC)

Tyler D'Whyte Roberts (born 12 January 1999) is a professional footballer who plays as a forward or attacking midfielder for EFL League One club Mansfield Town and the Wales national team.

Roberts is an academy graduate of West Bromwich Albion and made his professional debut for the club in May 2016. Loan spells in League One with Oxford United, Shrewsbury Town and Walsall followed before he joined Leeds United in January 2018. In the 2019-2020 season, Roberts was a member of the Leeds squad that won the 2019–20 EFL Championship title and promotion to the Premier League under manager Marcelo Bielsa. He spent the 2022–23 season on loan at Queens Park Rangers before joining Birmingham City in June 2023. He spent most of the 2024–25 season on loan at Northampton Town.

He made his senior Wales debut in 2018, having previously represented the nation at various youth levels, and represented Wales at UEFA Euro 2020. A versatile forward, he can play as a striker, winger or attacking midfielder.

== Early life ==
Born in Gloucester to parents of Jamaican and Welsh descent, Roberts moved to Birmingham aged 11. He attended Sandwell Academy in West Bromwich.

== Club career ==
=== West Bromwich Albion ===
Having spotted him playing for junior side Tredworth Tigers at a Gloucester Festival, West Bromwich Albion decided to sign Roberts for their academy when he was just seven years old. Having then gone on to represent the club at age group level, Roberts was named on West Brom's bench for the first time on the final day of the 2014–15 season against Arsenal. However, he did not make it on to the pitch. Following Roberts' inclusion in the squad, he was listed by Match of the Day magazine as one of the 20 wonder-kids to look out for in 2016. On 14 January 2016, just two days after his 17th birthday, Roberts turned professional with West Brom, signing a 2 1/2-year contract. He made his Premier League debut for the club on the final day of the 2015–16 season in a 1–1 draw with Liverpool, coming on as a second-half substitute for fellow academy graduate Jonathan Leko. Shortly after coming on, Roberts was booked for a rash challenge on Liverpool captain Jordan Henderson. He became only the second player born in 1999 to play in the Premier League, following on from Leko who had done so the month before.

==== 2016–2018: Loans to Oxford United, Shrewsbury Town and Walsall ====
On 28 July 2016, Roberts joined League One club Oxford United on loan until January 2017. He made his debut for the club on the opening day of the 2016–17 season, coming off the bench for Chris Maguire in a 1–1 draw with Chesterfield. His League Cup debut came the following week when he entered the field of play as an extra-time substitute in Oxford's 1–0 win over Birmingham City. He scored the first goal of his professional career in a 4–2 victory over League Two club Exeter City in the 2016–17 EFL Trophy on 30 August. On 5 November, Roberts made his FA Cup debut and scored in a 5–0 win over Merstham of the Isthmian League. In the second round a month later, he scored the winning penalty in a shootout against Southend United.

In December, Oxford manager Michael Appleton lodged a request to West Brom to extend Roberts' loan, but on 17 January 2017, he joined another League One club, Shrewsbury Town, on loan until the end of the season. He made his debut four days later, starting in a 1–0 league win over Oldham Athletic. Roberts' first goal for the club, and his first in league football, opened the scoring in a 2–1 win over Bury on 4 February. He suffered a hamstring injury in a 2–1 defeat to Millwall on 4 April that put an end to his stint at Shrewsbury. He ended the campaign with four goals and two assists for the club as they narrowly avoided relegation, and won the club's Young Player of the Year award.

On 25 August 2017, Roberts left West Brom on loan once again, joining League One side Walsall for the season. The following day, he scored one goal and assisted another on debut against Bradford City, helping Walsall come from 3–0 down to earn a 3–3 draw. He went on to score five goals in 17 appearances before being recalled by West Brom at the half-way mark of the season.

=== Leeds United ===
==== Transfer ====
Roberts' return to West Brom was short-lived, however, as the arrival of Daniel Sturridge on loan from Liverpool limited his first team chances further. As a result, on the final day of the January 2018 transfer window, he signed for Championship club Leeds United on a four-and-a-half-year deal for an undisclosed fee, reported at the time as £2.5 million and later reported as potentially rising to £4 million depending on clauses. Roberts had arrived at the club with a minor knock, and looked set to make his debut in the middle of February. However, on 14 February, new manager Paul Heckingbottom confirmed that he had cracked his shin bone when he returned to training and would be out for several weeks, but ultimately missed the remainder of the season.

==== 2018–19 season ====
After spending several months on the sidelines, Roberts made his unofficial debut as a second-half substitute during a pre-season friendly against Southend United. His full debut followed on 14 August when he started an EFL Cup fixture against Bolton Wanderers. In September, he made his league debut in a 1–1 draw with Millwall and three days later scored his first two goals for the club in a 3–0 victory over Preston North End. Playing in an attacking midfielder position, he assisted Patrick Bamford twice in a 4–0 victory over his former club, West Bromwich Albion, on 1 March, and received the man of the match award.

He was one of three players nominated for the club's Young Player Of The Season award alongside Jamie Shackleton and Jack Clarke, but lost out to Clarke.

Roberts scored three times in 32 games in all competitions as Leeds finished the regular season in third place; they dropped out of the automatic promotion places with three games left after a defeat to 10-man Wigan Athletic on 19 April. They qualified for the play-offs, but Roberts missed the final games of the season due to injury as his team let slip a 2–0 lead to lose 4–3 on aggregate to sixth-placed Derby County in the semi-final.

==== 2019–20 season ====
Roberts ended up missing all the 2019–20 pre-season games and the start of the new season after undergoing knee surgery during May 2019. He returned from injury against Charlton Athletic on 28 September 2019, before scoring his first goal of the season against Queens Park Rangers in a 2–0 win on 2 November 2019. However, Roberts picked up an injury against Reading on 26 November, which kept him out of the side for a month; he returned as a substitute in Leeds' 5–4 win against Birmingham City on 29 December, but picked up a hamstring injury in the same game. The injury kept him out of the team until early February 2020, when he returned as a second-half substitute in a 1–0 defeat at home to Wigan Athletic. On 29 February, Roberts came on as a 67th-minute substitute for Bamford with Leeds 2–0 ahead at Hull City and scored the last two goals of the 4–0 win. Following the suspension of the Championship season, Roberts appeared in eight of the club's final nine games, scoring once, as they were promoted to the Premier League.

==== 2020–21 season ====
Roberts made his first appearance of the 2020–21 Premier League on the opening day, coming on as a substitute in the 4–3 loss to reigning champions Liverpool at Anfield. His first goal of the season did not come until stoppage time of the visit to Southampton on 18 May to complete a 2–0 win.

==== 2021–22 season ====
In June 2021, Roberts signed a new three-year deal with Leeds to run until the summer of 2024.

Roberts came on as a 76th-minute substitute for Jack Harrison during a 1–0 away defeat at Leicester on 5 March 2022 and almost immediately ruptured a hamstring tendon, but continued to play for the full 90 minutes. He underwent surgery, and was out for the rest of the season.

==== 2022–23 season ====
Roberts joined Championship club Queens Park Rangers on 6 July 2022 on loan for the 2022–23 season. He scored on his QPR debut in an EFL Cup tie against Charlton Athletic on 9 August, and played regularly up to the end of October. He was affected by a recurrent calf injury that kept him out of Wales' World Cup squad and forced him to miss six QPR matches before the mid-season break for the 2022 World Cup. Although he regained fitness, returned to league action in December, and scored twice away to Reading to earn his side a comeback draw, further injury in January that required treatment back at Leeds put an early end to his season.

=== Birmingham City ===
Roberts signed a four-year contract with Championship club Birmingham City in June 2023; the fee was undisclosed.

On 30 August 2024, Roberts signed for League One club Northampton Town on loan for the remainder of the season. He made 29 appearances, mostly in the starting eleven.

=== Mansfield Town ===
On 1 September 2025, Roberts joined League One club Mansfield Town on a season-long loan.

On 2 February 2026, Roberts joined the Stags on a permanent deal until the end of the season.

On 12 May 2026, the club announced the player had signed a new one-year deal.

== International career ==
=== Youth ===
Though he represented England, his country of birth, at schoolboy level, Roberts later decided to play for Wales instead, qualifying for selection as two of his grandparents are Welsh.

In 2015, he captained the Wales U16 side to glory in the Victory Shield, scoring in the final against Northern Ireland. The result was Wales' first outright triumph in the competition since the 1948–49 edition. Having trained with the senior side in between, he returned to the U16 side in November the following year and was part of the squad which retained the Victory Shield title.

In May 2017, following the conclusion of the League One season, he was included in Robert Page's squad for the 2017 Toulon Tournament. After making his debut for the side in the tournament opener against Ivory Coast, Roberts made one further appearance, against France, as Wales were eliminated in the group stage. On 1 September 2017, he made his debut for the under-21 side and scored the opening goal in a 3–0 victory over Switzerland.

=== Senior ===
In May 2015, Roberts, along with Liverpool winger Harry Wilson, was called up by Wales manager Chris Coleman to train with the senior squad. In March 2017 he was named as a stand-by player for Wales' World Cup qualifier against the Republic of Ireland.

He received his first full call-up in August 2018 when he was named in Ryan Giggs' squad for the nation's UEFA Nations League matches against the Republic of Ireland and Denmark. His debut followed against the former on 6 September, coming on as a second-half substitute for Gareth Bale in a 4–1 victory. The following month, on 16 October 2018, Roberts was handed his first Wales start as the Republic of Ireland were again beaten 1–0 in Dublin. In May 2021 he was selected for the Wales squad for the delayed UEFA Euro 2020 tournament.

== Career statistics ==
=== Club ===
As of 7 March 2026

Appearances and goals by club, season and competition
Club	Season	League			FA Cup		League Cup		Other		Total	
Club	Season	League	Apps	Goals	Apps	Goals	Apps	Goals	Apps	Goals	Apps	Goals
West Bromwich Albion	2015–16	Premier League	1	0	0	0	0	0	—		1	0
West Bromwich Albion	2016–17	Premier League	0	0	0	0	0	0	—		0	0
West Bromwich Albion	Total		1	0	0	0	0	0	—		1	0
Oxford United (loan)	2016–17	League One	14	0	3	1	2	0	3 (Note: Appearance(s) in EFL Trophy)	1	22	2
Shrewsbury Town (loan)	2016–17	League One	13	4	—		—		—		13	4
Walsall (loan)	2017–18	League One	17	5	1	0	0	0	1	0	19	5
Leeds United	2018–19	Championship	28	3	1	0	2	0	—		31	3
Leeds United	2019–20	Championship	23	4	0	0	0	0	—		23	4
Leeds United	2020–21	Premier League	27	1	0	0	1	0	—		28	1
Leeds United	2021–22	Premier League	23	1	0	0	3	0	—		26	1
Leeds United	2022–23	Premier League	0	0	0	0	0	0	—		0	0
Leeds United	Total		101	9	1	0	6	0	0	0	108	9
Queens Park Rangers (loan)	2022–23	Championship	18	3	1	0	1	1	—		20	4
Birmingham City	2023–24	Championship	17	0	2	0	0	0	—		19	0
Birmingham City	2024–25	League One	0	0	0	0	2	0	0	0	2	0
Birmingham City	Total		17	0	2	0	2	0	0	0	21	0
Northampton Town (loan)	2024–25	League One	27	1	0	0	—		2	0	29	1
Mansfield Town (loan)	2025–26	League One	9	3	0	0	0	0	0	0	9	3
Mansfield Town (loan)	2025–26	League One	3	0	1	0	0	0	0	0	4	0
Mansfield Town (loan)	Total		12	3	1	0	0	0	0	0	13	3
Career total			217	25	8	1	11	1	6	1	242	28

=== International ===
As of match played 14 October 2024

National team	Year	Apps	Goals
Wales
Wales	2018	4	0
Wales	2019	3	0
Wales	2020	4	0
Wales	2021	8	0
Wales	2022	1	0
Total		20	0

== Honours ==
Leeds United

- EFL Championship: 2019–20

Wales U16

- Victory Shield: 2015; 2016
