= Louis Reed =

English footballer (born 1997)

Personal information
- Full name: Louis Samuel Reed
- Date of birth: 25 July 1997 (age 29)
- Place of birth: Barnsley, England
- Height: 5 ft 8 in (1.73 m)
- Position: Midfielder

Team information
- Current team: Mansfield Town
- Number: 25

Youth career
- 2012–2014: Sheffield United

Senior career*
Years	Team	Apps	(Gls)
2014–2018	Sheffield United	39	(0)
2017–2018	→ Chesterfield (loan)	42	(4)
2018–2021	Peterborough United	69	(2)
2021–2023	Swindon Town	59	(3)
2023–	Mansfield Town	127	(5)

International career^{‡}
2015	England U18	5	(0)
2015	England U19	2	(0)
2016	England U20	4	(0)
- * Club domestic league appearances and goals as of 17:09, 23 August 2026 (UTC) ‡ National team caps and goals as of 19:30, 11 January 2026 (UTC)

Louis Samuel Reed (born 25 July 1997) is an English professional footballer who plays as a midfielder for EFL League One club Mansfield Town.

== Club career ==
=== Sheffield United ===
Having come through the ranks of Sheffield United's academy, Reed made his first-team debut in a 1–0 home victory against South Yorkshire rivals Rotherham United on 8 April 2014. At 16 years and 257 days old, he is the youngest player ever to represent Sheffield United in league football.

After an impressive performance in a win over Fenerbahçe in a pre-season friendly, Reed signed a three-year professional contract with Sheffield United. He went on to make his first start for the club in the opening game of the 2014–15 season. Reed signed a new three-year deal with United on 24 July 2015. In July 2017, he joined Chesterfield on a season-long loan deal. He was later transfer-listed by Sheffield United at the end of the 2017–18 season.

=== Peterborough United ===
In June 2018, Reed joined Peterborough United for an undisclosed fee. In May 2021, after three seasons with the club, it was announced that Reed would leave Peterborough at the end of his contract.

=== Swindon Town ===
After a brief period on trial with Doncaster Rovers, Reed joined League Two club Swindon Town on 6 August 2021 on a free transfer. Following an impressive debut season, Reed was voted the club's Players' Player of the Year at the club's annual end of season awards.

=== Mansfield Town ===
On 15 January 2023, Reed signed an 18-month contract with EFL League Two side Mansfield Town, after joining the club for an undisclosed fee.

On 7 May 2025 the club announced it had triggered an extension to the player's contract.

== Career statistics ==
As of 11 January 2026

Appearances and goals by club, season and competition
Club	Season	League			FA Cup		League Cup		Other		Total	
Club	Season	Division	Apps	Goals	Apps	Goals	Apps	Goals	Apps	Goals	Apps	Goals
Sheffield United	2013–14	League One	1	0	0	0	0	0	0	0	1	0
Sheffield United	2014–15	League One	19	0	6	0	5	0	2 (Note: Appearances in Football League Trophy)	0	32	0
Sheffield United	2015–16	League One	19	0	2	0	2	0	2	0	25	0
Sheffield United	2016–17	League One	0	0	—		—		1 (Note: Appearance(s) in EFL Trophy)	0	1	0
Sheffield United	Total		39	0	8	0	7	0	5	0	59	0
Chesterfield (loan)	2017–18	League Two	42	4	1	0	1	0	3	0	47	4
Peterborough United	2018–19	League One	28	1	3	0	0	0	5	0	36	1
Peterborough United	2019–20	League One	24	1	3	0	1	0	1	0	29	1
Peterborough United	2020–21	League One	17	0	1	0	0	0	2	1	20	1
Peterborough United	Total		69	2	7	0	1	0	8	1	85	3
Swindon Town	2021–22	League Two	39	2	3	2	1	0	2 (Note: Appearance(s) in League Two play-offs)	0	45	4
Swindon Town	2022–23	League Two	20	1	1	0	0	0	1	0	22	1
Swindon Town	Total		59	3	4	2	1	0	3	0	67	5
Mansfield Town	2022–23	League Two	5	0	—		—		—		5	0
Mansfield Town	2023–24	League Two	45	2	1	0	4	0	—		50	2
Mansfield Town	2024–25	League One	41	0	3	0	0	0	—		44	0
Mansfield Town	2025–26	League One	15	1	3	2	1	0	1	0	20	3
Mansfield Town	Total		106	3	7	2	5	0	1	0	119	5
Career total			315	12	27	4	15	0	20	1	377	17

== Honours ==
Peterborough United

- EFL League One runner-up promotion: 2020–21

Mansfield Town

- EFL League Two third-place promotion: 2023–24

Individual

- Chesterfield Player of the Year: 2017–18
- Swindon Town Players' Player of the Year: 2021–22
- EFL League Two Team of the Season: 2023–24
