= Taylor Anderson (footballer) =

English association football player

Personal information
- Full name: Taylor Ellis Anderson
- Date of birth: 5 November 2004 (age 22)
- Place of birth: Nottingham, England
- Position: Defender

Team information
- Current team: Mansfield Town
- Number: 27

Youth career
- 2019–2023: Mansfield Town

Senior career*
Years	Team	Apps	(Gls)
2023–	Mansfield Town	5	(0)
2025	→ Alfreton Town (loan)	8	(0)
2026	→ King's Lynn Town (loan)	2	(0)
- * Club domestic league appearances and goals as of 20:13, 10 February 2026 (UTC)

Taylor Ellis Anderson is an English professional footballer who plays as a defender for EFL League One club Mansfield Town.

== Career ==
Anderson joined the Mansfield Town academy in 2019. On 14 February 2023, he made his professional debut, coming on as a late substitute for Elliott Hewitt in a 4–0 victory over Carlisle United. He then made 2 more appearances that season, causing the club to trigger the extension option on his contract.

In October 2025, Anderson joined National League North club Alfreton Town on a one-month loan deal.

== Career statistics ==
As of match played 15 October 2025

Appearances and goals by club, season and competition
Club	Season	League			FA Cup		League Cup		Other		Total	
Club	Season	Division	Apps	Goals	Apps	Goals	Apps	Goals	Apps	Goals	Apps	Goals
Mansfield Town	2022–23	League Two	3	0	0	0	0	0	0	0	3	0
Mansfield Town	2023–24	League Two	0	0	0	0	0	0	1 (Note: Appearance(s) in EFL Trophy)	0	1	0
Mansfield Town	2024–25	League One	1	0	0	0	0	0	1	0	2	0
Mansfield Town	2025–26	League One	1	0	0	0	0	0	2	0	3	0
Career total			5	0	0	0	0	0	4	0	9	0
