= Max Dickov =

English footballer (born 2002)

Personal information
- Full name: Max Paul Dickov
- Date of birth: 27 April 2002 (age 24)
- Place of birth: Manchester, England
- Height: 1.80 m (5 ft 11 in)
- Position: Attacking midfielder

Team information
- Current team: Eastleigh
- Number: 7

Youth career
- 2009–2011: Manchester City
- Oldham Athletic
- Oldham Athletic

Senior career*
Years	Team	Apps	(Gls)
2017–2018	AFC Macclesfield	1	(0)
2019–2020	Poynton	12	(1)
2020–2022	Stockport Town	26	(14)
2022–2025	Brentford	0	(0)
2025–2026	Mansfield Town	14	(0)
2026	→ Tranmere Rovers (loan)	8	(0)
2026–	Eastleigh	1	(0)

International career
2018	England Schoolboys		
- * Club domestic league appearances and goals as of 12:30, 9 August 2026 (UTC)

Max Paul Dickov (born 27 April 2002) is an English professional footballer who plays as an attacking midfielder for National League club Eastleigh.

Dickov is a product of the Manchester City and Oldham Athletic academies and began his senior career with spells at non-League clubs AFC Macclesfield, Poynton and Stockport Town. He began his professional career with Brentford B in 2022 and transferred to Mansfield Town in 2025. In 2026, Dickov returned to non-League football with Eastleigh.

== Club career ==
=== Youth years and non-League football ===
An attacking midfielder, Dickov and his brother Sam entered the Manchester City Academy at the age of seven. Following his release in 2011 and two spells with Oldham Athletic, Dickov turned down the opportunity of scholarships and instead played the first senior football of his career with Cheshire League clubs AFC Macclesfield and Poynton. He moved on to North West Counties League First Division club Stockport Town in 2020. Dickov scored eight goals in 9 appearances during the COVID-19-affected 2020–21 season, before scoring and six goals in 19 appearances prior to his final appearance for the club midway through the 2021–22 season.

=== Brentford ===
On 29 June 2022, Dickov transferred to the B team at Premier League club Brentford and signed a one-year contract, with the option of a further year, effective 1 July 2022, on a free transfer. He had spent a large amount of the second half of the 2021–22 season on trial with the team. Dickov was a member of the 2022–23 Premier League Cup-winning squad and at the end of the season, the one-year option on his contract was taken up, with a further one-year option attached.

Dickov made a first team friendly appearance during the 2023–24 pre-season and signed a new one-year contract at the end of the campaign. He was a member of the 2024–25 Professional Development League-winning squad and was released when his contract expired at the end of the season. Dickov was deployed as a utility player during his time at the club, featuring as a full back, wing back, winger and midfielder.

=== Mansfield Town ===
On 16 August 2025, Dickov signed a one-year contract with League One club Mansfield Town on a free transfer. He made 19 appearances during the first half of the 2025–26 season, predominantly as a substitute, before joining League Two club Tranmere Rovers on loan for the remainder of the season on the final day of the winter transfer window. He made eight appearances during his spell and departed Mansfield Town when his contract expired.

=== Eastleigh ===
On 13 July 2026, Dickov signed an undisclosed-length contract with National League club Eastleigh on a free transfer.

== Representative career ==
Dickov was capped by England Schoolboys.

== Personal life ==
Dickov's father Paul is a former Scottish international footballer and his brother Sam combines an off-field role with Manchester City with that of an amateur footballer. Dickov attended Wilmslow High School.

== Career statistics ==
As of match played 8 August 2026

Appearances and goals by club, season and competition
Club	Season	League			National cup (Note: Includes FA Cup)		League cup (Note: Includes EFL Cup)		Other		Total	
Club	Season	Division	Apps	Goals	Apps	Goals	Apps	Goals	Apps	Goals	Apps	Goals
AFC Macclesfield	2017–18	Cheshire League First Division	1	0	0	0	―		1 (Note: Appearance in Cheshire Amateur Cup)	0	2	0
Poynton	2019–20	Cheshire League Premier Division	12	1	0	0	―		1	0	12	1
Stockport Town	2020–21	North West Counties League First Division	8	8	0	0	―		1 (Note: Appearance in FA Vase)	0	9	8
Stockport Town	2021–22	North West Counties League First Division	18	6	0	0	―		1 (Note: Appearance in Cheshire Senior Cup)	0	19	6
Stockport Town			26	14	0	0	―		4	0	30	14
Mansfield Town	2025–26	League One	14	0	1	0	1	0	3 (Note: Appearances in EFL Trophy)	1	19	1
Tranmere Rovers (loan)	2025–26	League Two	8	0	―		―		―		8	0
Eastleigh	2026–27	National League	1	0	0	0	―		0	0	1	0
Career total			49	14	1	0	1	0	7	1	58	15

== Honours ==
Brentford B

- Premier League Cup: 2022–23
