= 2011 FA Trophy final =

2011 FA Trophy Final
- Event: 2010–11 FA Trophy
Mansfield Town	Darlington
0	1
- After extra time
- Date: 7 May 2011
- Venue: Wembley Stadium, London
- Referee: Stuart Attwell
- Attendance: 24,668

The 2011 FA Trophy Final was the 42nd final of the Football Association's cup competition for levels 5–8 of the English football league system. The match was contested by Mansfield Town and Darlington. Neither team had ever reached the FA trophy final before, and had only recently become eligible for the FA trophy after Mansfield Town were relegated from League Two in 2008 and Darlington were relegated from League Two in 2010.

Mansfield Town defeated Worksop Town, Newport County, Alfreton Town, Chasetown, and Luton Town en route to the Final.

Darlington defeated Tamworth, Bath City, A.F.C. Telford United, Salisbury City, and Gateshead en route to the final.

Darlington won 1–0 in extra time, after the match had ended in a 0–0 draw. The goal was scored by Chris Senior in the 119th minute, seconds before the match was due to end in a penalty shoot-out.

== Route to the final ==
=== Mansfield Town ===
Date	Home team	Score	Away team	Venue

14 December 2010 First round	Worksop Town	0–5	Mansfield Town	New Manor Ground
19:45			Parker 17'; Briscoe 45'; Duffy 51'; Grand 65'; Medley 90'	Attendance: 682

15 January 2011 Second round	Mansfield Town	4–2	Newport County	Field Mill
15:00	Connor 11', 21'; Parker 35'; Briscoe 82'		Morgan 60'; Matthews 80'	Attendance: 1,137

5 February 2011 Third round	Mansfield Town	1–1	Alfreton Town	Field Mill
15:00	Connor 46'		Arnold 45+1'	Attendance: 3,408

8 February 2011 Third Round, replay	Alfreton Town	1–2	Mansfield Town	Impact Arena
19:45	Connor 60'; Parker 77'		Wilson 16'	Attendance: 2,131

1 March 2011 Fourth round	Chasetown	2–2	Mansfield Town	Scholar's Ground
19:45	Turner 59'; Davies 90'		Connor 35'; Briscoe 74'	Attendance: 2,000

8 March 2011 Fourth Round, replay	Mansfield Town	3–1	Chasetown	Field Mill
19:45	Murray 35'; Briscoe 56'; Mitchley 75'		Jevons 52'	Attendance: 2,295

13 March 2011 Semi-final, 1st leg	Mansfield Town	1–0	Luton Town	Field Mill
12:00	Mitchley 62'			Attendance: 3,208

19 March 2011 Semi-final, 2nd leg	Luton Town	1–1; Agg. 1–2	Mansfield Town	Kenilworth Road
15:00	Owusu 46'		Briscoe 118'	Attendance: 6,133

=== Darlington ===
Date	Home team	Score	Away team	Venue

14 December 2010 First round	Darlington	3–2	Tamworth	The Darlington Arena
19:45	Main 47', 67'; Verma 79'		Rodman 58'; Sheridan 70'	Attendance: 432

15 January 2011 Second round	Darlington	4–1	Bath City	The Darlington Arena
15:00	Arnison 40', 44'; Hatch 50'; Verma 70'		Connolly 61'	Attendance: 926

5 February 2011 Third round	A.F.C. Telford United	0–3	Darlington	Bucks Head
15:00			Smith 2'; Verma 73'; Modest 90'	Attendance: 1,505

26 February 2011 Fourth round	Darlington	2–1	Salisbury	The Darlington Arena
15:00	Smith 71'; Hatch 75'		Clarke 90'	Attendance: 1,869

12 March 2011 Semi-final, 1st leg	Darlington	3–2	Gateshead	The Darlington Arena
15:00	Bridge-Wilkinson 55'; Hatch 76', 83'		Fisher 20'; Rundle 44'	Attendance: 4,208

19 March 2011 Semi-final, 2nd leg	Gateshead	0–0; Agg. 2–3	Darlington	Gateshead International Stadium
15:00				Attendance: 5,156

== Match ==
=== Summary ===
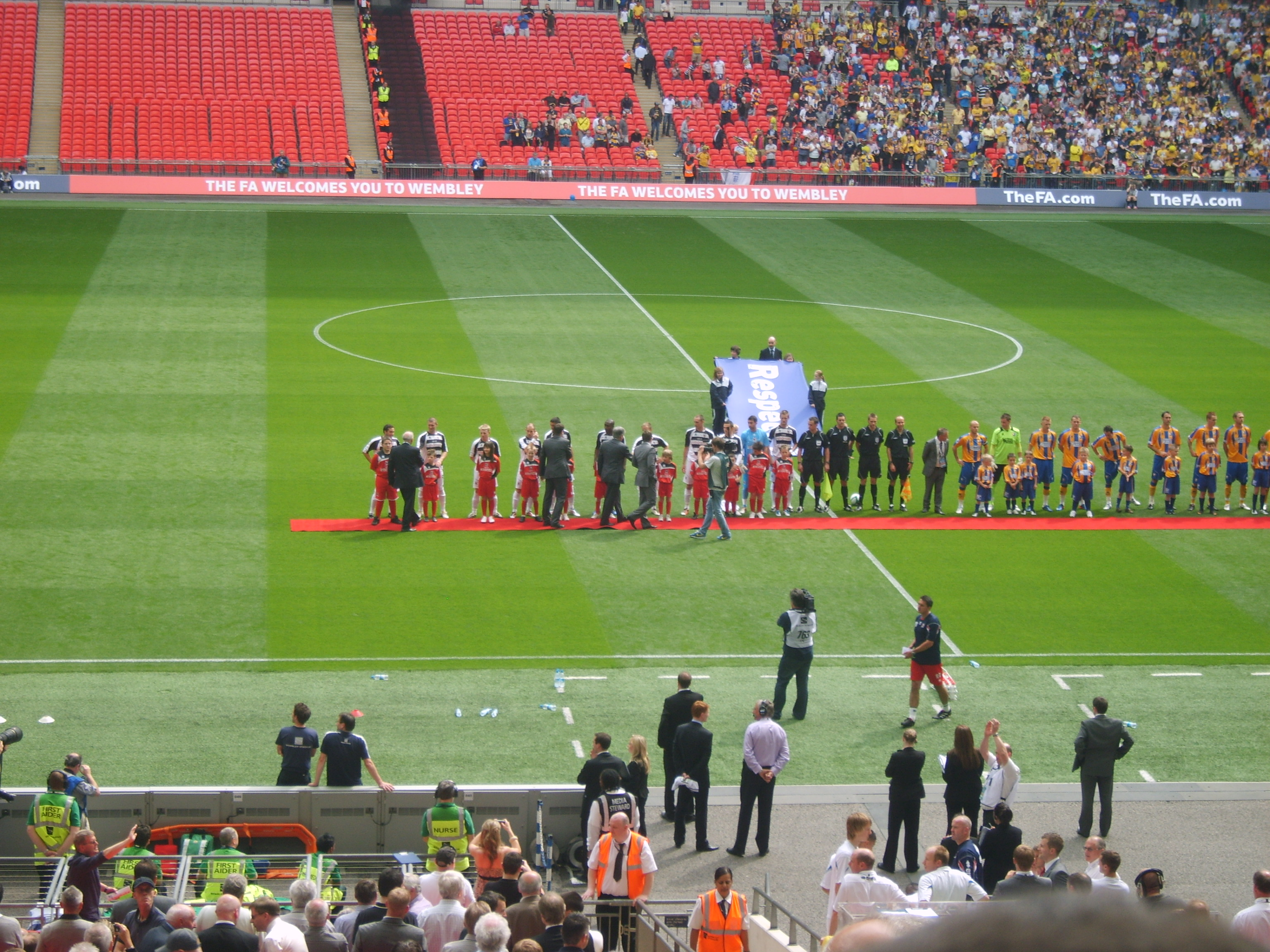
Darlington and Mansfield teams lining up before the game

The final was played on 7 May 2011 at London's Wembley Stadium. Darlington defeated Mansfield Town 1–0 after extra time, thanks to a goal from striker Chris Senior. This was the first time that Darlington had scored at Wembley in three visits to the national stadium.

The game was a particularly even affair with both sides carving out early chances. Darlington goalkeeper Sam Russell had to be alert early on to clear an Adam Murray pass which had sent Duncan Russell clean through on goal. At the other end, Alan Marriott did well to punch away a corner from Aaron Brown before Liam Hatch could get his head on it. In the 18th minute, a Mansfield corner was met by the head of former Darlington captain Steve Foster, but the ball sailed well over the bar. On 32 minutes, Gary Smith broke into the Mansfield, where he appeared to be brought down by Louis Briscoe. Referee Stuart Attwell, who was well placed, waved away the penalty appeals. Darlington suffered a blow on 38 minutes when Smith, who had been lively in midfield, limped off to be replaced by Aman Verma. The first half of the match concluded with the score at 0–0.

Despite Darlington dominating the opening exchanges of the second half, Mansfield created an excellent chance when Briscoe took on two players from the right and his cross-shot was deflected just over the bar by his team-mate Paul Connor.

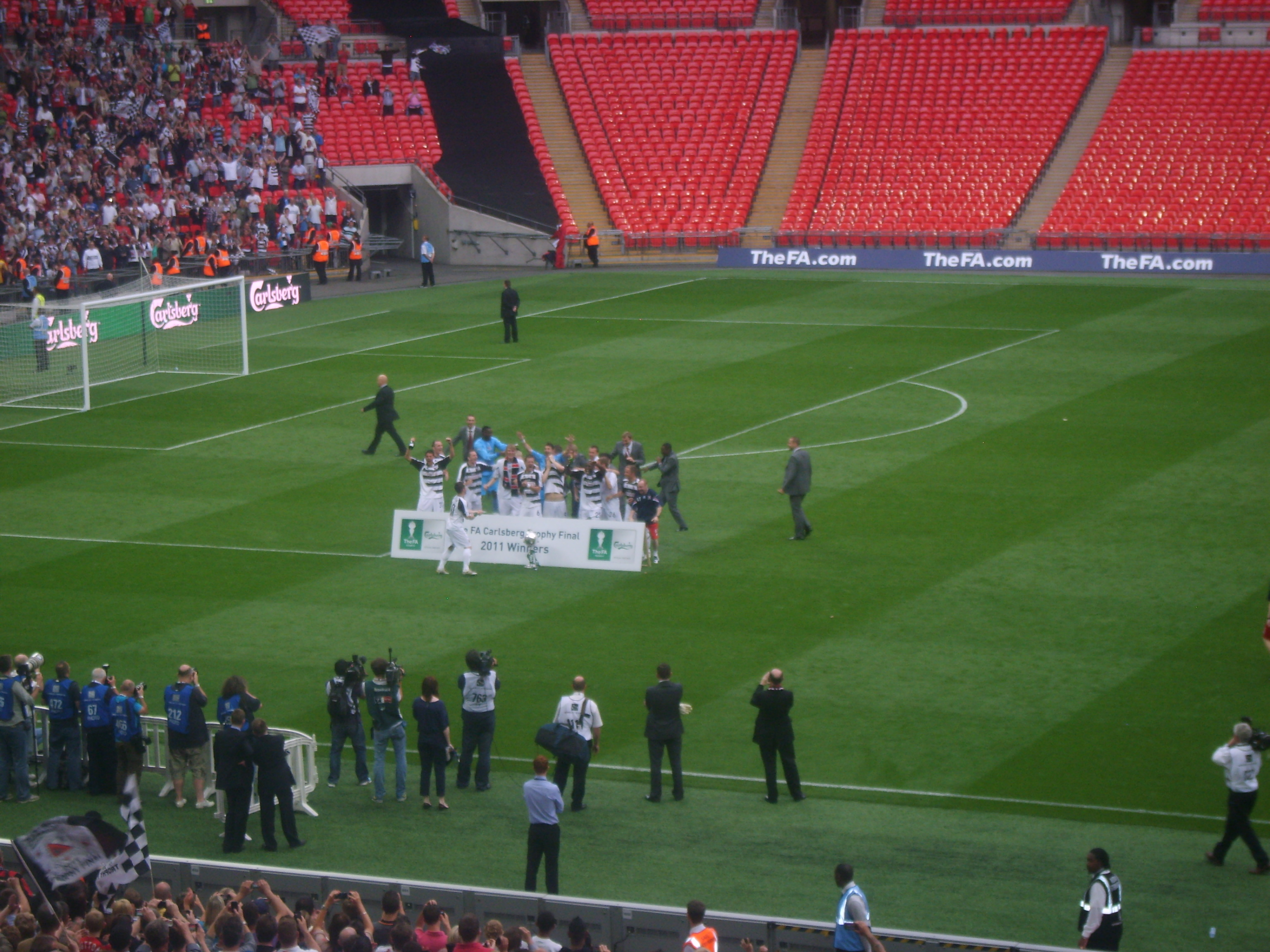
Darlington players celebrate their victory after the trophy presentation

After 58 minutes Darlington had an excellent chance to take the lead. John Campbell broke clear down the left hand side of the pitch and crossed low for Tommy Wright; the striker took too long, however, and Mansfield were able to clear for a corner. Both sides traded attacks, none of which came to much, before Darlington were awarded an 89th minute free-kick 25 yards out, following an unfair challenge on Verma. Marc Bridge-Wilkinson took the free-kick, which clattered against Marriott's right hand post, with the Mansfield 'keeper well beaten.

In the dying seconds of normal time, Bridge-Wilkinson crossed into the box where Wright headed wide with a diving attempt. When the whistle blew for the end of normal time, the match remained at 0–0.

Both teams created chances, during an extra time period marked by both teams increasing fatigue. During extra-time, Darlington replaced Bridge-Wilkinson with Paul Terry, while Mansfield brought on Danny Mitchley for Murray. During a fraught final period of extra time Mansfield threatened when Ashley Cain's cross reached the far post where Connor headed narrowly over the bar. Then, eight minutes from time, Chris Moore forced a Darlington corner. Brown took it and Wright headed against the post, before Ian Miller forced a fine save from Marriott.

As a penalty shoot-out loomed over the match, Darlington created one last chance. In the 119th minute, an Aaron Brown long throw was flicked on by Miller and found Wright, who got to the ball ahead of Marriott to send a looping header towards the Mansfield goal. The ball hit the bar before falling to Chris Senior who headed into the roof of the net to send the Darlington fans into raptures and secure an FA Trophy final victory for Darlington.

=== Details ===
7 May 2011
1500 GMT

Mansfield Town	0–1 (a.e.t.)	Darlington
	Report	Senior 119'

Wembley Stadium, London
Attendance: 24,668
Referee: Stuart Attwell

Mansfield Town	Darlington

GK	1	(England) Alan Marriott
DF	2	(England) Gary Silk
DF	5	(England) Steve Foster
DF	20	(England) Tom Naylor
DF	3	(England) Daniel Spence
MF	10	(Australia) Kyle Nix
MF	8	(England) Tyrone Thompson
MF	11	(England) Adam Smith	(substituted off) 95'
MF	29	(England) Adam Murray (c)	(substituted off) 108'
FW	7	(England) Louis Briscoe
FW	23	(England) Paul Connor
Substitutes:
GK	25	(England) Neil Collett
DF	17	(England) Paul Stonehouse
MF	26	(England) Ashley Cain	(substituted on) 95'
FW	35	(England) Danny Mitchley	(substituted on) 108'
Manager:
(England) Duncan Russell

GK	23	(England) Sam Russell
DF	2	(England) Paul Arnison
MF	4	(England) Jamie Chandler
DF	6	(England) Ian Miller (c)
FW	7	(England) Liam Hatch
FW	9	(England) Tommy Wright	(yellow card) 103'
MF	11	(England) Chris Moore
MF	20	(England) Gary Smith		(substituted off) 39'
DF	25	(England) Aaron Brown
MF	31	(England) Marc Bridge-Wilkinson		(substituted off) 99'
FW	32	(England) John Campbell		(substituted off) 74'
Substitutes:
GK	33	(England) Danzelle St Louis-Hamilton
FW	10	(England) Chris Senior		(substituted on) 74'
MF	21	(England) Paul Terry		(substituted on) 99'
DF	26	(England) Phil Gray
MF	29	(England) Aman Verma		(substituted on) 39'
Manager:
(England) Mark Cooper

== See also ==
- 2011 FA Trophy: Match Highlights
