= Alan Marriott =

Alan Marriott may refer to:

- Alan Marriott (footballer) (born 1978), English footballer
- Alan Marriott (voice actor) (born 1971), Canadian voice actor
