= Louis Briscoe =

English footballer (born 1988)

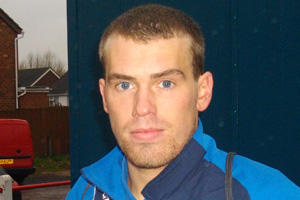
- Briscoe pictured in 2011

Personal information
- Full name: Louis Andrew Briscoe
- Date of birth: 2 April 1988 (age 38)
- Place of birth: Burton upon Trent, England
- Height: 6 ft 0 in (1.83 m)
- Positions: Winger; striker

Youth career
- Port Vale

Senior career*
Years	Team	Apps	(Gls)
2005–2007	Port Vale	4	(0)
2007–2008	Leek Town	38	(17)
2008	Hednesford Town	9	(2)
2008	Gresley Rovers		
2008	Stafford Rangers		
2009	Ilkeston Town		
2009–2014	Mansfield Town	175	(34)
2013	→ Nuneaton Town (loan)	2	(0)
2014–2016	Torquay United	60	(10)
2016	Wrexham	4	(0)
2016–2017	Tamworth	28	(4)
2017	→ Boston United (loan)	9	(1)
2017–2018	Stafford Rangers		
2018	Sutton Coldfield Town		
2018	Mickleover Sports		
2018–2020	Stafford Rangers	19	(1)
2019–2020	→ Gresley Rovers (loan)		
2020–2022	Gresley Rovers		
Total		348	(69)

International career
2009	England C	1	(1)
- * Club domestic league appearances and goals

Louis Andrew Briscoe (born 2 April 1988) is an English former professional footballer. His playing position was primarily on the right wing, although he could also play as a striker or on the left wing.

He started his career with Football League side Port Vale in 2005 but failed to make an impact and moved on to non-League Leek Town two years later. After brief spells with Hednesford Town, Gresley Rovers, Stafford Rangers, and Ilkeston Town, he won a move to Conference club Mansfield Town in 2009. He helped the club to an FA Trophy final and was named in the Conference Team of the Year in 2010–11. He then won the Conference Premier title with Mansfield in 2012–13. He was loaned out to Nuneaton Town in October 2013 before ending his five-year stay at Mansfield in May 2014. In June 2014, he signed for Torquay United. He joined Wrexham in January 2016 before moving on to Tamworth five months later. He joined Boston United on loan in March 2017 before a permanent move to Stafford Rangers in June 2017. He switched to Sutton Coldfield Town and Mickleover Sports briefly in January 2018 before returning to Stafford Rangers in the summer. He rejoined his former club, Gresley Rovers, in January 2020.

== Club career ==
Born in Burton upon Trent, Staffordshire, Briscoe began his career as a trainee at Port Vale. He made four Football League appearances for Vale, making his debut as a 17-year-old in a 1–0 defeat to Bristol City at Vale Park on 17 December 2005. His three further League One appearances came later on in the 2005–06 season, after which he was voted Youth Player of the Year by the Port Vale management. The following season he made just the one appearance, coming off the bench late into a 4–0 defeat at League Two Hereford United in the FA Cup. Manager Martin Foyle released Briscoe from his contract in January 2007.

Briscoe then joined non-League Leek Town, where he found regular football. He had an unsuccessful trial with Houston Dynamo in March 2008. He bagged a total of 17 goals in 38 Northern Premier League Premier Division games for Leek, before departing in summer 2008 after the club suffered relegation. The next season, he played for a multitude of Northern non-League sides, playing a handful of games for Hednesford Town (in the Premier Division), Gresley Rovers (in Division One South), Stafford Rangers (in the Conference), and Ilkeston Town (in the Premier Division).

Briscoe played under David Holdsworth at Ilkeston. When Holdsworth was appointed as manager of Mansfield Town in November 2008, he offered the young winger a chance to return to full-time football. Briscoe signed with the "Stags" in January 2009, and made his debut on 17 January against Crawley Town. He scored his first goal for the club against Ebbsfleet United on 7 April. Fitting in well at the Conference Premier club, he made 38 appearances for in the 2009–10 campaign.

In November 2010, he signed a contract to keep him at Mansfield until May 2012. He played 13 goals in 42 league games in 2010–11. However, his most telling contribution would be in the FA Trophy, where he booked the club a place in the Wembley final with an extra time goal against Luton Town in the semi-finals. Despite creating numerous chances for his teammates in the final itself, opponents Darlington triumphed with a 1–0 victory. At the end of the campaign Briscoe was named in the Conference Team of the Year, and was made Mansfield Town's Player of the Season. He scored a hat-trick in a 7–0 demolition of Barrow at Field Mill on 17 March 2012, completing his treble with a 25 yards (23 m) volley. The "Stags" reached the play-offs in 2011–12, before losing to York City at the semi-final stage. Briscoe scored 11 goals in 40 games.

He scored eight goals in 44 appearances in the 2012–13 campaign, as Mansfield won promotion into the Football League as Conference champions. He was rewarded with a new contract of an undisclosed length. After losing his first-team place at Mansfield he joined Conference club Nuneaton Town on a one-month loan in October 2013. Having played only five competitive games in the 2013–14 campaign, Briscoe was released by manager Paul Cox in May 2014.

In June 2014, he signed for newly-relegated Conference club Torquay United; "Gulls" manager Chris Hargreaves stated that "Louis has pace, he can beat a man, he has an excellent goal record for a winger, and he can also play up front if needed". He scored eight goals in 45 appearances in the 2014–15 campaign. However, he was released by new manager Kevin Nicholson in January 2016 after failing to score in the 2015–16 season. Pundit Guy Branston supported Nicholson's decision, saying that Briscoe "wasn't pulling up any trees and, if anything, had too many trees on his hips".

Briscoe signed with Wrexham in January 2016, two weeks after leaving divisional rivals Torquay. His move to the Racecourse Ground had been delayed due to a calf injury. However, he made just four appearances before being released by manager Gary Mills at the end of the 2015–16 season. He joined Tamworth in July 2016 after impressing manager Andy Morrell on trial. However, he found game time limited at The Lamb Ground during the 2016–17 season, and so on 17 March he agreed to join National League North rivals Boston United on loan until the end of the season, who were managed by former Mansfield captain Adam Murray. The following day, Briscoe scored on hie "Pilgrims" debut to secure a 2–0 victory away at Worcester City.

Briscoe joined Stafford Rangers for a second time in June 2017. He switched to Northern Premier League Premier Division rivals Sutton Coldfield Town in early January 2018. His stay at Sutton Coldfield lasted a matter of days, as on 19 January 2018 he was announced as a new signing by Mickleover Sports manager John McGrath. Sports finished 13th in the Northern Premier League Premier Division at the end of the 2017–18 campaign and then joined Stafford Rangers for a third time in the summer, helping Rangers to a 14th-place finish in the Northern Premier League Premier Division in 2018–19. On 3 January 2020, he rejoined Gresley Rovers on loan, now in the Midland League Premier Division. He scored four goals in twelve games. As a result of the COVID-19 pandemic in England, the 2019–20 season was formally abandoned on 26 March, with all results from the season being expunged. The 2020–21 season was also abandoned due to the ongoing pandemic. He was a player-coach during the 2021–22 season as Gresley won promotion into the Northern Premier League as runners-up of the United Counties League Premier Division North. He played 41 games for the club, scoring two goals, with his final appearance being on 19 April 2022.

== International career ==
While at Mansfield, Briscoe debuted for England C, the team representing England at non-League level. He scored in a 1–1 draw with Hungary Under-23s on 15 September 2009.

== Career statistics ==
Appearances and goals by club, season and competition
Club	Season	League			FA Cup		League Cup		Other		Total	
Club	Season	Division	Apps	Goals	Apps	Goals	Apps	Goals	Apps	Goals	Apps	Goals
Port Vale	2005–06	League One	4	0	0	0	0	0	0	0	4	0
Port Vale	2006–07	League One	0	0	1	0	0	0	0	0	1	0
Port Vale	Total		4	0	1	0	0	0	0	0	5	0
Leek Town	2007–08	Northern Premier League; Premier Division	38	17	0	0	0	0	5	2	43	19
Hednesford Town	2008–09	Northern Premier League; Premier Division	9	2	1	0	0	0	1 (Note: Appearance/s and goal/s in the Birmingham Senior Cup.)	1	11	3
Mansfield Town	2008–09	Conference Premier	17	1	0	0	—		0	0	17	1
Mansfield Town	2009–10	Conference Premier	37	3	1	0	—		0	0	38	3
Mansfield Town	2010–11	Conference Premier	42	13	1	0	—		9 (Note: Appearance/s and goal/s in the FA Trophy.)	5	52	18
Mansfield Town	2011–12	Conference Premier	38	11	0	0	—		3	0	41	11
Mansfield Town	2012–13	Conference Premier	39	6	5	2	—		1	0	45	8
Mansfield Town	2013–14	League Two	2	0	0	0	1	0	0	0	3	0
Mansfield Town	Total		175	34	7	2	1	0	13	5	196	41
Nuneaton Town (loan)	2013–14	Conference Premier	2	0	0	0	—		0	0	2	0
Torquay United	2014–15	Conference Premier	39	10	1	0	—		5	0	45	8
Torquay United	2015–16	National League	21	0	1	0	—		2	0	24	0
Torquay United	Total		60	10	2	0	0	0	7	0	69	10
Wrexham	2015–16	National League	4	0	—		—		—		4	0
Tamworth	2016–17	National League North	28	4	0	0	—		0	0	28	4
Boston United (loan)	2016–17	National League North	9	1	—		—		—		9	1
Stafford Rangers	2018–19	Northern Premier League; Premier Division	9	1	0	0	0	0	2 (Note: Appearance/s in the Staffordshire Senior Cup.)	0	11	1
Stafford Rangers	2019–20	Northern Premier League; Premier Division	10	0	2	1	1	0	1	0	14	1
Stafford Rangers	Total		19	1	2	1	1	0	3	0	25	2
Career total (Note: Statistics for Hednesford Town, Gresley Rovers, Stafford Rangers, Ilkeston Town, Sutton Coldfield Town and Mickleover Sports not known.)			348	69	13	3	2	0	29	8	392	80

== Honours ==
Mansfield Town

- Conference Premier: 2012–13
- FA Trophy runner-up: 2010–11

Gresley Rovers

- United Counties League Premier Division North second-place promotion: 2021–22

Individual

- Conference Premier Team of the Year: 2010–11
- Mansfield Town Player of the Season: 2010–11
