= 2010–11 FA Trophy =

FA Challenge Trophy

Tournament details
- Country: England; Wales
- Teams: 266

Final positions
- Champions: Darlington
- Runners-up: Mansfield Town

Tournament statistics
- Matches played: 320
- Goals scored: 1,053 (3.29 per match)

The 2010–11 FA Trophy is the 41st season of the FA Trophy, the Football Association's cup competition for teams at levels 5–8 of the English football league system. A total of 266 clubs have entered the competition. This was reduced to 265 when Ilkeston Town withdrew after the club was wound up.

== Calendar ==
Round	Date	Matches	Clubs	New entries this round	Prize money
Preliminary round	2 October 2010	54	265→211	108	£2,000
First round qualifying	16 October 2010	72	211→139	90	£2,200
Second round qualifying	30 October 2010	36	139→103	none	£3,000
Third round qualifying	20 November 2010	39	103→64	43	£4,000
First round	11 December 2010	32	64→32	24	£5,000
Second round	15 January 2011	16	32→16	none	£6,000
Third round	5 February 2011	8	16→8	none	£7,000
Fourth round	26 February 2011	4	8→4	none	£8,000
Semi-finals	12 March and 19 March 2011	2	4→2	none	£16,000
Final	7 May 2011	1	2→1	none	£50,000 (winners), £25,000 (runners up)

== Preliminary round ==
Ties will be played on 2 October 2010.

=== Ties ===
Tie	Home team	Score	Away team	Attendance
1	Newcastle Town	2–2	Goole	100
2	Loughborough Dynamo	2–4	Romulus	113
3	Shepshed Dynamo	2–1	Warrington Town	123
4	Woodley Sports	1–1	Lancaster City	87
5	Atherstone Town	2–4	Stamford	187
6	Witton Albion	1–0	Sutton Coldfield Town	210
7	Brigg Town	1–3	Bedworth United	113
8	Leigh Genesis	0–5	Garforth Town	60
9	AFC Fylde	1–2	Market Drayton Town	163
10	Lincoln United	3–2	Barwell	110
11	Ossett Albion	4–1	Salford City	109
12	Skelmersdale United	5–1	Wakefield	136
13	Clitheroe	5–0	Leek Town	242
14	Glapwell	3–0	Spalding United	68
15	Belper Town	0–1	Harrogate Railway Athletic	149
16	Rainworth Miners Welfare	1–1	Sheffield	109
17	Grantham Town	0–2	Carlton Town	164
18	Mossley	1–1	Kidsgrove Athletic	136
19	Rushall Olympic	1–0	Trafford	85
20	Brentwood Town	4–3	East Thurrock United	98
21	Barton Rovers	3–1	Maldon & Tiptree	62
22	Waltham Abbey	0–2	Soham Town Rangers	54
23	Eastbourne Town	1–2	Walton Casuals	80
24	Needham Market	4–2	Hitchin Town	216
25	Ilford	2–0	Whitstable Town	62
26	Ware	1–2	Whitehawk	85
27	Fleet Town	3–1	Tilbury	65
28	Wingate & Finchley	4–1	Horsham YMCA	155
29	Thamesmead Town	0–0	Heybridge Swifts	62
30	Chipstead	1–2	Godalming Town	71
31	Walton & Hersham	1–2	Faversham Town	82
32	Ashford Town (Kent)	w/o	Ramsgate	N/A
	Walkover for Ramsgate – Ashford Town (Kent) removed			
33	Merstham	4–6	AFC Sudbury	101
34	Corinthian-Casuals	0–3	Potters Bar Town	44
35	Leatherhead	1–3	Enfield Town	186
36	Arlesey Town	2–0	Sittingbourne	107
37	Metropolitan Police	1–1	Biggleswade Town	82
38	Bognor Regis Town	0–0	Whyteleafe	252
39	Cheshunt	0–2	Great Wakering Rovers	109
40	Redbridge	2–1	Chatham Town	57
41	Burnham	1–1	Northwood	77
42	Andover	2–3	Bideford	100
43	Slough Town	2–2	Marlow	221
44	Leighton Town	0–1	Rugby Town	137
45	Bromsgrove Rovers	w/o	Frome Town	N/A
	Walkover for Frome Town – Bromsgrove Rovers removed			
46	Wimborne Town	2–1	Gosport Borough	279
47	AFC Totton	3–0	Yate Town	192
48	Cinderford Town	1–1	Mangotsfield United	85
49	Bedfont Town	0–2	Uxbridge	71
50	Clevedon Town	0–1	Bishop's Cleeve	135
51	North Greenford United	2–1	Thatcham Town	63
52	Stourport Swifts	0–1	Bridgwater Town	87
53	North Leigh	3–2	Sholing	58
54	Taunton Town	2–2	Hungerford Town	131

=== Replays ===
Tie	Home team	Score	Away team	Attendance
1	Goole	1–2	Newcastle Town	117
4	Lancaster City	7–1	Woodley Sports	122
16	Sheffield	3–1 †	Rainworth Miners Welfare	135
18	Kidsgrove Athletic	1–4	Mossley	116
29	Heybridge Swifts	1–2	Thamesmead Town	76
37	Biggleswade Town	2–0	Metropolitan Police	85
38	Whyteleafe	1–6	Bognor Regis Town	143
41	Northwood	1–2	Burnham	72
43	Marlow	0–3	Slough Town	223
48	Mangotsfield United	1–2	Cinderford Town	183
54	Hungerford Town	1–0	Taunton Town	101

† – After extra time

== First round qualifying ==
Ties will be played on 16 October 2010.

Teams from Premier Division of Southern League, Northern Premier League and Isthmian League entered in this round.

=== Ties ===
Tie	Home team	Score	Away team	Attendance
1	Marine	2–2	Ashton United	216
2	Matlock Town	10–0	Bedworth United	266
3	Nantwich Town	6–2	Prescot Cables	274
4	Hednesford Town	1–2	Whitby Town	313
5	Cammell Laird	1–2	Witton Albion	140
6	Lancaster City	4–2	Ossett Town	178
7	North Ferriby United	0–2	Bamber Bridge	179
8	Sheffield	1–1	Chasetown	240
9	Harrogate Railway Athletic	2–1	Ossett Albion	119
10	Carlton Town	1–1	Rushall Olympic	87
11	Colwyn Bay	2–0	Bradford Park Avenue	337
12	Chorley	1–0	Quorn	734
13	Retford United	2–2	Romulus	131
14	Curzon Ashton	3–1	Skelmersdale United	169
15	F.C. United of Manchester	5–0	Newcastle Town	1,035
16	Burscough	0–2	Clitheroe	201
17	Buxton	1–2	Stocksbridge Park Steels	321
18	Shepshed Dynamo	1–4	Mossley	137
19	Radcliffe Borough	1–1	Garforth Town	104
20	Mickleover Sports	2–1	Hucknall Town	186
21	Glapwell	2–0	Stamford	144
22	Kendal Town	3–0	Frickley Athletic	182
23	Northwich Victoria	0–0	Lincoln United	367
24	Durham City	0–2	FC Halifax Town	282
25	Market Drayton Town	1–1	Worksop Town	147
26	Wealdstone	2–2	Potters Bar Town	201
27	Bury Town	2–0	Barton Rovers	353
28	Bognor Regis Town	1–0	Croydon Athletic	283
29	Harrow Borough	0–1	Hendon	174
30	Canvey Island	1–2	AFC Sudbury	293
31	Arlesey Town	0–0	Ramsgate	96
32	Enfield Town	2–1	Walton Casuals	220
33	Great Wakering Rovers	1–2	Thamesmead Town	76
34	Dulwich Hamlet	2–2	Hastings United	216
35	Sutton United	3–1	Tooting & Mitcham United	448
36	Cray Wanderers	2–1	Wingate & Finchley	98
37	Maidstone United	2–0	Burgess Hill Town	232
38	Soham Town Rangers	1–2	Grays Athletic	164
39	Needham Market	2–2	Lowestoft Town	381
40	Waltham Forest	0–2	Romford	72
41	Tonbridge Angels	3–2	Concord Rangers	384
42	Cambridge City	1–0	Aveley	243
43	Faversham Town	1–2	Kingstonian	230
44	Fleet Town	0–2	Godalming Town	122
45	AFC Hornchurch	2–1	Brentwood Town	214
46	Harlow Town	3–2	Bedford Town	248
47	Carshalton Athletic	2–0	Ilford	216
48	Margate	5–1	Whitehawk	227
49	Biggleswade Town	0–1	Billericay Town	166
50	Folkestone Invicta	4–2	Worthing	236
51	Horsham	3–0	Redbridge	188
52	Swindon Supermarine	4–2	Beaconsfield SYCOB	111
53	Uxbridge	4–1	Abingdon United	56
54	Truro City	1–0	Bishop's Cleeve	330
55	Woodford United	1–3	Leamington	298
56	Windsor & Eton	1–1	Aylesbury	156
57	Almondsbury Town	1–0	Didcot Town	85
58	Weymouth	2–1	Bashley	363
59	Cinderford Town	2–2	Hungerford Town	72
60	Bridgwater Town	1–3	Stourbridge	201
61	Ashford Town (Middx)	6–2	North Greenford United	78
62	Burnham	0–0	Brackley Town	102
63	Banbury United	1–1	Wimborne Town	239
64	Slough Town	1–1	Chippenham Town	251
65	Cirencester Town	3–0	Halesowen Town	112
66	Evesham United	1–0	Frome Town	107
67	Paulton Rovers	3–3	North Leigh	182
68	Bideford	4–2	Tiverton Town	268
69	Chesham United	1–1	Salisbury City	297
70	Hemel Hempstead Town	2–3	Rugby Town	167
71	AFC Totton	5–0	AFC Hayes	219
72	Oxford City	1–4	Daventry Town	152

=== Replays ===
Tie	Home team	Score	Away team	Attendance
1	Ashton United	1–3	Marine	130
8	Chasetown	3–1	Sheffield	316
10	Rushall Olympic	4–1	Carlton Town	78
13	Romulus	2–1	Retford United	73
19	Garforth Town	1–2	Radcliffe Borough	78
23	Lincoln United	2–3	Northwich Victoria	101
25	Worksop Town	1–0	Market Drayton Town	159
26	Potters Bar Town	1–3	Wealdstone	137
31	Ramsgate	2–3 †	Arlesey Town	105
34	Hastings United	1–2	Dulwich Hamlet	243
39	Lowestoft Town	6–2	Needham Market	546
56	Aylesbury	1–2	Windsor & Eton	107
59	Hungerford Town	1–2	Cinderford Town	75
62	Brackley Town	4–0	Burnham	106
63	Wimborne Town	1–3 †	Banbury United	235
64	Chippenham Town	4–1	Slough Town	244
67	North Leigh	1–2	Paulton Rovers	71
69	Salisbury City	2–1	Chesham United	463

† – After extra time

== Second round qualifying ==
Ties will be played on 30 October 2010.

=== Ties ===
Tie	Home team	Score	Away team	Attendance
1	Curzon Ashton	2–1	FC Halifax Town	392
2	Leamington	3–0	Bamber Bridge	510
3	Romulus	1–2	Harrogate Railway Athletic	107
4	Kendal Town	1–1	Matlock Town	242
5	Worksop Town	2–1	Lancaster City	262
6	Rushall Olympic	0–1	Stourbridge	241
7	Mossley	2–3	Nantwich Town	194
8	Mickleover Sports	2–5	Chasetown	250
9	F.C. United of Manchester	2–1	Colwyn Bay	1,259
10	Radcliffe Borough	1–1	Witton Albion	193
11	Chorley	3–1	Marine	834
12	Whitby Town	3–1	Clitheroe	265
13	Northwich Victoria	4–0	Glapwell	323
14	Stocksbridge Park Steels	3–2	Rugby Town	152
15	Kingstonian	3–5	Wealdstone	428
16	Salisbury City	2–1	Almondsbury Town	577
17	Cirencester Town	2–1	Weymouth	95
18	Margate	1–2	AFC Hornchurch	325
19	Tonbridge Angels	2–0	Enfield Town	517
20	Billericay Town	2–1	Banbury United	285
21	AFC Sudbury	5–1	Hendon	289
22	Brackley Town	4–0	Windsor & Eton	187
23	Arlesey Town	2–2	Uxbridge	102
24	Daventry Town	1–2	Cambridge City	311
25	Paulton Rovers	4–5	Swindon Supermarine	159
26	Grays Athletic	2–1	Cinderford Town	198
27	Truro City	2–0	Horsham	361
28	Folkestone Invicta	0–0	Thamesmead Town	233
29	Bognor Regis Town	1–1	Godalming Town	298
30	Evesham United	0–1	Sutton United	188
31	Harlow Town	2–0	Carshalton Athletic	296
32	Ashford Town (Middx)	2–1	Bury Town	100
33	Cray Wanderers	1–2	Maidstone United	224
34	Bideford	1–0	Dulwich Hamlet	246
35	Chippenham Town	1–1	Lowestoft Town	383
36	AFC Totton	1–3	Romford	284

=== Replays ===
Tie	Home team	Score	Away team	Attendance
4	Matlock Town	1–2	Kendal Town	212
10	Witton Albion	3–1	Radcliffe Borough	188
23	Uxbridge	4–2	Arlesey Town	74
28	Thamesmead Town	1–3	Folkestone Invicta	87
29	Godalming Town	2–5	Bognor Regis Town	161
35	Lowestoft Town	3–1 †	Chippenham Town	577

† – After extra time

== Third round qualifying ==
Ties will be played on 20 November 2010

This round is the first in which Conference North and South teams join the competition. After Ilkeston Town folded, Redditch United received a bye to the first round.

=== Ties ===
Tie	Home team	Score	Away team	Attendance
1	Alfreton Town	4–0	Kendal Town	399
2	Vauxhall Motors	1–3	Stalybridge Celtic	280
3	Blyth Spartans	1–0	Stafford Rangers	391
4	Whitby Town	2–2	Northwich Victoria	247
5	AFC Telford United	2–1	Corby Town	1,028
6	Curzon Ashton	2–1	Solihull Moors	162
7	Leamington	1–2	Hyde	522
8	F.C. United of Manchester	1–2	Hinckley United	1,249
9	Worksop Town	4–1	Stocksbridge Park Steels	290
10	Boston United	2–1	Gainsborough Trinity	1,136
11	Droylsden	3–2	Stourbridge	246
12	Eastwood Town	2–0	Cambridge City	246
13	Chorley	0–1	Guiseley	890
14	Harrogate Town	1–1	Witton Albion	243
15	Harrogate Railway Athletic	3–4	Nantwich Town	142
16	Workington	0–0	Chasetown	305
17	Nuneaton Town	1–2	Worcester City	592
18	Dover Athletic	1–2	Woking	818
19	Braintree Town	2–0	Farnborough	255
20	Lewes	1–3	Salisbury City	598
21	Maidenhead United	2–4	Uxbridge	211
22	Weston-super-Mare	1–3	Dorchester Town	184
23	Basingstoke Town	2–2	Havant & Waterlooville	301
24	Eastleigh	2–1	Folkestone Invicta	253
25	Cirencester Town	2–2	Grays Athletic	157
26	Sutton United	4–2	Billericay Town	329
27	Ebbsfleet United	4–0	Bromley	611
28	Thurrock	0–2	Dartford	405
29	Boreham Wood	3–0	Romford	103
30	Welling United	1–0	Tonbridge Angels	431
31	St Albans City	3–1	Staines Town	249
32	Truro City	1–2	AFC Sudbury	349
33	Bishop's Stortford	1–2	Ashford Town (Middx)	302
34	Brackley Town	0–1	Wealdstone	302
35	Lowestoft Town	2–1	Swindon Supermarine	622
36	Bideford	0–3	AFC Hornchurch	265
37	Harlow Town	3–0	Maidstone United	294
38	Bognor Regis Town	2–2	Hampton & Richmond Borough	376
39	Gloucester City	1–0	Chelmsford City	316

=== Replays ===
Tie	Home team	Score	Away team	Attendance
4	Northwich Victoria	1–0	Whitby Town	260
14	Witton Albion	1–2	Harrogate Town	175
16	Chasetown	4–0	Workington	334
23	Havant & Waterlooville	1–2	Basingstoke Town	353
25	Grays Athletic	0–1	Cirencester Town	153
38	Hampton & Richmond Borough	2–0	Bognor Regis Town	200

== First round ==
Ties will be played on 11 December 2010

This round is the first in which Conference Premier teams join those from lower reaches of the National League System.

The Curzon Ashton vs. Altrincham match on 11 December 2010 was abandoned at half time due to a power failure with the score 2–1 in favour of Curzon Ashton. The rescheduled game on 14 December 2010 finished 2–0 to Altrincham.

=== Ties ===
Tie	Home team	Score	Away team	Attendance
1	Wrexham	2–0	Kidderminster Harriers	1,122
2	Rushden & Diamonds	1–1	Eastwood Town	657
3	Worksop Town	0–5	Mansfield Town	682
4	Droylsden	4–3	Hinckley United	175
5	Curzon Ashton	0–2	Altrincham	268
6	Darlington	3–2	Tamworth	477
7	Harrogate Town	0–3	AFC Telford United	247
8	Chasetown	3–3	Kettering Town	AE444
9	Stalybridge Celtic	2–1	Nantwich Town	321
10	York City	0–1	Boston United	1,318
11	Blyth Spartans	2–0	Fleetwood Town	354
12	Alfreton Town	3–0	Hyde	254
13	Worcester City	1–0	Northwich Victoria	577
14	Grimsby Town	3–0	Redditch United	1,116
15	Barrow	2–3	Guiseley	923
16	Gateshead	2–2	Southport	233
17	Dorchester Town	3–0	St Albans City	302
18	Histon	2–3	Bath City	263
19	Luton Town	0–0	Welling United	1,639
20	Eastleigh	1–1	Sutton United	388
21	Harlow Town	0–2	Woking	324
22	Ashford Town (Middx)	1–0	AFC Hornchurch	161
23	Cirencester Town	1–1	Gloucester City	406
24	Eastbourne Borough	3–1	Boreham Wood	422
25	Ebbsfleet United	3–1	Hayes & Yeading United	614
26	Cambridge United	2–1	Forest Green Rovers	1,045
27	Crawley Town	3–3	Dartford	1,031
28	AFC Sudbury	1–4	Hampton & Richmond Borough	279
29	Lowestoft Town	2–3	Uxbridge	609
30	Newport County	0–0	Wealdstone	1,070
31	AFC Wimbledon	3–0	Braintree Town	1,201
32	Basingstoke Town	0–2	Salisbury City	475

=== Replays ===
Tie	Home team	Score	Away team	Attendance
2	Eastwood Town	4–3 †	Rushden & Diamonds	314
8	Kettering Town	1–2 †	Chasetown	581
16	Southport	0–1	Gateshead	302
19	Welling United	1–2	Luton Town	404
20	Sutton United	0–4	Eastleigh	237
23	Gloucester City	3–0	Cirencester Town	226
27	Dartford	1–0	Crawley Town	605
30	Wealdstone	0–1	Newport County	324

† – After extra time

== Second round ==
Ties will be played on 15 January 2011

=== Ties ===
Tie	Home team	Score	Away team	Attendance
1	Gateshead	6–0	Hampton & Richmond Borough	336
2	Boston United	0–1	Gloucester City	1,110
3	AFC Wimbledon	2–3	Woking	2,259
4	Droylsden	1–0	Ebbsfleet United	336
5	Chasetown	2–1	Grimsby Town	1,012
6	Alfreton Town	3–3	Cambridge United	929
7	Ashford Town (Middx)	0–1	Dartford	474
8	Luton Town	4–0	Uxbridge	1,958
9	AFC Telford United	1–0	Eastwood Town	1,159
10	Darlington	4–1	Bath City	926
11	Mansfield Town	4–2	Newport County	1,137
12	Blyth Spartans	2–1	Altrincham	620
13	Dorchester Town	3–3	Eastbourne Borough	402
14	Guiseley	2–1	Stalybridge Celtic	417
15	Eastleigh	3–3	Worcester City	407
16	Salisbury City	1–0	Wrexham	1,032

=== Replays ===
Tie	Home team	Score	Away team	Attendance
6	Cambridge United	3–6 †	Alfreton Town	1,098
13	Eastbourne Borough	1–0	Dorchester Town	487
15	Worcester City	1–4	Eastleigh	564

† – After extra time

== Third round ==
Ties will be played on 5 February 2011

=== Ties ===
Tie	Home team	Score	Away team	Attendance
1	Eastbourne Borough	1–1	Guiseley	471
2	Mansfield Town	1–1	Alfreton Town	3,408
3	Blyth Spartans	2–2	Droylsden	708
4	Luton Town	1–0	Gloucester City	2,212
5	AFC Telford United	0–3	Darlington	1,505
6	Woking	0–2	Salisbury City	1,551
7	Eastleigh	1–3	Chasetown	562
8	Gateshead	3–0	Dartford	501

=== Replays ===
Tie	Home team	Score	Away team	Attendance
1	Guiseley	2–1	Eastbourne Borough	446
2	Alfreton Town	1–2	Mansfield Town	2,131
3	Droylsden	0–4	Blyth Spartans	229

† – After extra time

== Quarter finals ==
Ties will be played on 26 February 2011

=== Ties ===
Tie	Home team	Score	Away team	Attendance
1	Blyth Spartans	0–2	Gateshead	2,719
2	Guiseley	0–1	Luton Town	1,152
3	Darlington	2–1	Salisbury City	1,869
4	Chasetown	2–2	Mansfield Town	2,000

=== Replay ===
Tie	Home team	Score	Away team	Attendance
4	Mansfield Town	3–1	Chasetown	2,295

† – After extra time

== Semi-finals ==
=== First leg ===
13 March 2011
12:00 (GMT)

Mansfield Town	1–0	Luton Town
Mitchley 62'	(Report)

Field Mill, Mansfield
Attendance: 3,208
Referee: Karl Evans

12 March 2011
15:00 (GMT)

Darlington	3–2	Gateshead
Bridge-Wilkinson 56'; Hatch 75', 81'	(Report)	Fisher 21'; Rundle 43'

The Darlington Arena, Darlington
Attendance: 4,243
Referee: Carl Boyeson

=== Second leg ===
19 March 2011
15:00 (GMT)

Luton Town	1–1 (a.e.t.)	Mansfield Town
Owusu 46'	(Report)	Briscoe 118'

Kenilworth Road, Luton
Attendance: 6,133

Mansfield Town win 2–1 on aggregate

19 March 2011
15:00 (GMT)

Gateshead	0–0	Darlington
	(Report)

Gateshead International Stadium, Gateshead
Attendance: 5,156
Referee: Mark Haywood

Darlington win 3–2 on aggregate

== Final ==
7 May 2011
15:00 (GMT)

Mansfield Town	0–1 (a.e.t.)	Darlington
		Senior 120'

Wembley Stadium, London
Attendance: 24,668
Referee: Stuart Attwell
