= Keith Haslam =

English football executive

Keith Haslam is a former owner, CEO and chairman of Mansfield Town.

Haslam bought the club in 1993. During his tenure, he amassed personal and inter-company loans of over £1,000,000 at their peak. In 2006, it was understood that he still owed the club part of the value of his personal loan, but refused to consider paying it back because he claimed it was an inter-company loan.

On 26 April 2008, following the club's relegation to the Conference, Haslam was punched and kicked by Mansfield fans, requiring hospital treatment. At the end of the 2007-08 season, he sold the club to a consortium led by Andy Perry.

In December 2008, Haslam controversially announced a club dividend of £2.44m, £2.36m of which went to a company belonging to him. The legality of that was challenged by the new owners. Haslam used £1.9m of the money to buy the club's home ground, Field Mill, separating the ground from the club. In March 2012, Haslam leased Field Mill to the club's owner, local businessman John Radford, who had bought the club for £1 in 2010. The lease arrangement ended in 2019, with Radford buying the freehold of Field Mill, finally ending Haslam's involvement with Mansfield Town.
