= Alan Marriott (footballer) =

English footballer (born 1978)

Personal information
- Date of birth: 3 September 1978 (age 48)
- Place of birth: Bedford, England
- Height: 5 ft 11 in (1.80 m)
- Position: Goalkeeper

Youth career
- 1995–1997: Tottenham Hotspur

Senior career*
Years	Team	Apps	(Gls)
1997–1999	Tottenham Hotspur	0	(0)
1999–2008	Lincoln City	354	(0)
2008–2009	Rushden & Diamonds	12	(0)
2009–2014	Mansfield Town	201	(1)
Total		567	(1)
- * Club domestic league appearances and goals

Alan Marriott (born 3 September 1978) is an English former professional footballer who played as a goalkeeper.

In a career that lasted from 1997 until 2014. Marriott came through the ranks at Tottenham Hotspur he went on to notably spend 9 years with Lincoln City where he was involved in two play-off final defeats at the Millennium Stadium whilst playing under Keith Alexander. Marriott amassed 354 League appearances for the Imps and later had a spell with Rushden & Diamonds before a five-year stint at Mansfield Town in which he was the clubs player of the season during the 2009–10 season and the Conference National title in 2012.

== Career ==
=== Tottenham Hotspur ===
Marriott began his career at Tottenham Hotspur, signing a professional contract in the summer of 1997 following the completion of his two-year youth training scheme. He was released by Spurs at the completion of the 1998–99 season.

=== Lincoln City ===
==== Initial seasons ====
Marriott linked up with Lincoln City, initially on trial and then on a three-month contract following a recommendation from one-time Lincoln manager and then Tottenham's Director of Youth, Colin Murphy. In October 1999 he agreed a two-year contract with the Imps and went on to make his first team debut on 12 February 2000 in a 2–1 home victory over Torquay United. He retained his place for the remainder of the season which culminated in him being awarded Lincoln's Young Player of the Year.

Marriott began the following season as the established number one choice and, following a series of impressive performances, was rewarded with a new three-year contract at the end of September 2000. In a 1–1 draw away to Carlisle United on 2 December 2000, Marriott limped off injured after 37 minutes with a knee injury; this kept him away from the first team for a three-month spell. The season would conclude with Marriott named Away Player of the Season.

==== 140 consecutive league appearances ====
A shaky start to the 2001–02 season, which saw errors in the games against Halifax Town, Grimsby Town and Scunthorpe United, caused Marriott to be replaced by Paul Pettinger in the Lincoln goal. However, following a 1–0 home defeat to Bristol Rovers on 15 September 2001, Marriott was restored to first team. Although he was forced off injured at half time in the 1–0 home defeat to Southend United on 16 March 2003, it would be exactly three years, from the 1–1 away draw with Luton Town on 18 September 2001, until the 0–0 away draw with Bristol Rovers on 18 September 2004, before he would miss another league game: a total of 140 consecutive appearances. Injury would cause him to miss the 1–1 home draw with Chester City on 25 September 2004.

==== The Keith Alexander era ====
Following Lincoln's move into administration towards the end of the 2001–02 season, the club appointed Keith Alexander as manager. Alexander based his team around a solid defensive unit and it was, perhaps, this period which saw Marriott's best performances. Against all expectations, Lincoln reached the play-off final in the 2002–03 season, conceding just 37 league goals with Marriott keeping 18 clean sheets in the league. Despite the disappointment of defeat in the final to AFC Bournemouth, Marriott agreed a new two-year contract in the summer of 2003.

The 2003–04 season saw Lincoln reach the play-offs once again, with Marriott to the fore with 17 clean sheets in the league, 10 of them away from Sincil Bank. Marriott's efforts were rewarded with second place in the voting for Lincoln's Player of the Season but he collected the Bill Stacey Memorial Trophy after being named Away Player of the Season.

The 2004–05 season saw a third unsuccessful tilt at the play-offs, though Marriott managed to keep 19 clean sheets in the league. He became the 28th Lincoln player to start 250 competitive games when keeping his 72nd Football League clean sheet in the 1–0 home victory over Swansea City on 9 April 2005; Lincoln manager Keith Alexander recognised the feat by making Marriott captain for the game. In June 2005 he agreed a new three-year contract with the Imps.

The 1–1 home draw with Bury on 15 April 2006 saw Marriott become only the 13th player in Lincoln's history to have started 300 competitive matches. Lincoln marked the occasion by making Marriott captain for the game.

==== A season of records ====
The 2006–07 season saw Marriott once again ever-present in the Lincoln goal, and was memorable not only for him reaching 300 league appearances but also breaking a number of the club's goalkeeping records. The 300th appearance came in the 2–2 away draw to Bury on 18 January 2007 with Marriott becoming just the ninth player in Lincoln's history to reach this figure. His 309th league appearance in the 1–0 home victory over Barnet on 17 March 2007 saw him equal Dan McPhail's club record for Football League appearances by a goalkeeper; he would claim the record for himself when appearing in the following week's 3–2 home defeat to Swindon Town. In keeping a clean sheet in the 0–0 draw away to Bristol Rovers on 21 April 2007, Marriott equalled McPhail's club record of 97 clean sheets in The Football League whilst simultaneously passing McPhail's total club record of 102 clean sheets; Marriott's clean sheet the following week in the 0–0 away draw with Grimsby Town saw him surpass The Football League record.

==== Final Lincoln season ====
2007–08 began with Marriott achieving yet another notable record: his clean sheet in the 2–0 victory against Accrington Stanley on 25 August 2007 saw him become the first goalkeeper in Lincoln's history to keep 100 clean sheets in The Football League. However, Lincoln's form in the league was not so notable, resulting in the dismissal of manager John Schofield in October 2007. The newly appointed Peter Jackson's first signing was goalkeeper Ben Smith, on loan from Doncaster Rovers, a move which saw Marriott dropped. Although he retained his place in January, Marriott's contract was not renewed at the end of the season, bringing an end to nine seasons at Lincoln in which he made 351 league appearances, conceding 414 goals and keeping 106 clean sheets in the process. In a poll on the official Lincoln City website of the best 100 players to ever play for the club, Marriott was placed 19th by Lincoln fans.

=== Rushden & Diamonds ===
On 9 July 2008, Marriott signed for Conference National side Rushden & Diamonds. He made only 12 league appearances for the Diamonds before being signed by Mansfield Town on 8 January 2009 on a short-term contract.

=== Mansfield Town ===
Seven clean sheets in his first nine games, in which he conceded just two goals, saw Marriott offered a new contract, which he signed in March 2009. Marriott scored a goal from his own penalty area against Wrexham on 20 April 2012. In May 2012 Marriott signed a new contract ahead of the 2012–13 season. Marriott made his 200th league appearance for Mansfield in a 1–0 win over AFC Wimbledon in March 2014. Marriott was offered a new contract at the end of the season, though he left the club after turning it down.

== Career statistics ==
Appearances and goals by club, season and competition
Club	Season	League			FA Cup		League Cup		Other		Total	
Club	Season	Division	Apps	Goals	Apps	Goals	Apps	Goals	Apps	Goals	Apps	Goals
Tottenham Hotspur	1998–99	Premier League	0	0	0	0	0	0	0	0	0	0
Lincoln City	1999–2000	Third Division	18	0	0	0	0	0	0	0	18	0
Lincoln City	2000–01	Third Division	30	0	1	0	2	0	2 (Note: Appearance(s) in Football League Trophy)	0	35	0
Lincoln City	2001–02	Third Division	43	0	3	0	1	0	1	0	48	0
Lincoln City	2002–03	Third Division	46	0	1	0	1	0	3 (Note: Appearance(s) in Division Three play-offs)	0	51	0
Lincoln City	2003–04	Third Division	46	0	2	0	1	0	2 (Note: 2 appearance(s) in Division Three play-offs) (Note: 3 appearance(s) in Football League Trophy)	0	54	0
Lincoln City	2004–05	League Two	45	0	1	0	2	0	3	0	51	0
Lincoln City	2005–06	League Two	46	0	2	0	2	0	1	0	50	0
Lincoln City	2006–07	League Two	46	0	1	0	0	0	3 (Note: 1 appearance(s) in Football League Trophy) (Note: 2 appearance(s) in League Two play-offs)	0	50	0
Lincoln City	2007–08	League Two	34	0	2	0	1	0	1	0	38	0
Lincoln City	Total		354	0	13	0	10	0	16	0	393	0
Rushden & Diamonds	2008–09	Conference Premier	12	0	0	0	0	0	0	0	12	0
Mansfield Town	2008–09	Conference Premier	18	0	0	0	0	0	0	0	18	0
Mansfield Town	2009–10	Conference Premier	44	0	2	0	0	0	0	0	46	0
Mansfield Town	2010–11	Conference Premier	17	0	0	0	0	0	1 (Note: Appearance(s) in FA Trophy)	0	18	0
Mansfield Town	2011–12	Conference Premier	45	1	2	0	0	0	3 (Note: 1 appearance(s) in FA Trophy) (Note: 2 appearances in Conference play-offs)	0	50	1
Mansfield Town	2012–13	Conference Premier	37	0	2	0	0	0	0	0	39	0
Mansfield Town	2013–14	League Two	40	0	3	0	1	0	1	0	45	0
Mansfield Town	Total		201	1	9	0	1	0	5	0	216	1
Career total			567	1	22	0	11	0	21	0	621	1

== Honours ==
Lincoln City

- Football League Third Division/Football League Two play-off finalist (2): 2002–03, 2004–05
- Football League Third Division/Football League Two play-off semi-finalist (3): 2003–04, 2005–06, 2006–07

Mansfield Town

- Conference National winner: 2012–13
- Conference National play-off semi-finalist: 2011–12
- FA Trophy finalist: 2010–11
