= John Radford (businessman) =

English businessman (born 1965)

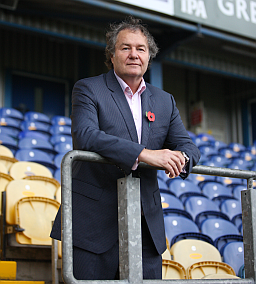
- Radford on the terraces at Field Mill football ground, Mansfield in 2015
- Born: John Lawrence Radford; 1965 (age 60–61); Mansfield, England
- Occupations: Chairman, Mansfield Town; Owner, One Call Insurance
- Spouse: Carolyn Still (m. 2012)
- Children: 3

John Lawrence Radford (born 1965) is an English businessman and owner of Mansfield Town Football Club, which he bought in 2010. He also founded and is CEO of One Call Insurance, which sponsors Mansfield Town Football Club.

== Mansfield Town ==
In 2010, Radford invested into Mansfield Town from then-owners Steve Hymas, Steve Middleton and chairman Andy Saunders, purchasing the club for £1. The club's ground Field Mill (known as One Call Stadium for sponsorship purposes) remained in ownership of Keith Haslam until Radford's purchase in 2012. Then a Football Conference side, Radford promised to return them to the Football League, which was achieved in 2013.

Radford created controversy by appointing his then-girlfriend Carolyn Still, whom he later married, to the position of Chief Executive Officer at the football club in September 2011.

When buying, Radford had pledged to invest £500,000 into the club; his investment, however, was higher at an estimated £100,000 per month. He had already given the club £250,000 to save it from administration.

In February 2013, following an 8–1 win for Mansfield against Barrow, Radford donated an Aston Martin DB9 car valued at £80,000 to manager Paul Cox as a reward. Radford had wanted to reward Cox for improving on the previous season when they had beaten Barrow, 7–0. Cox departed in November 2014 by "mutual consent".

== Hotel projects ==
In early 2018, Radford announced a business proposal to establish a six-floor hotel at the club's stadium, in conjunction with an international brand. No formal planning application had been submitted to Mansfield District Council at the time of discussions at the club's ground, but a later application was authorised by the council in July 2018.

Radford announced his intention to proceed with a hotel project after his previous plan to build on the town's old bus station in mid-2017 was unsuccessful, with the local council choosing another developer as 'preferred bidder'.
