= Mansfield Town F.C. =

Association football club in Mansfield, England

Mansfield Town
- Full name: Mansfield Town Football Club
- Nickname: The Stags
- Founded: 1897; 129 years ago (as Mansfield Wesleyans)
- Ground: Field Mill
- Capacity: 10,022
- Owner: John Radford
- Chief Executive: Carolyn Radford
- Manager: Nigel Clough
- League: EFL League One
- 2025–26: EFL League One, 10th of 24
- Website: mansfieldtown.net
Home colours	Away colours	Third colours

Mansfield Town Football Club is a professional association football club based in the town of Mansfield, Nottinghamshire, England. The team competes in EFL League One, the third level of the English football league system.

The club was formed in 1897 as Mansfield Wesleyans and entered the Mansfield & District Amateur League in 1902, before changing its name to Mansfield Wesley and joining the Notts & District League in 1906. They then finally became Mansfield Town in 1910, and moved from the Notts & Derbyshire League to the Central Alliance the following year. Crowned Alliance champions in 1919–20, they joined the Midland League in 1921 and won this league on three occasions – 1923–24, 1924–25 and 1928–29 – before they were admitted into the Football League in 1931. They were relegated out of the Third Division in 1960, but won promotion out of the Fourth Division in 1962–63, remaining in the third tier for nine seasons until their relegation in 1972. They reached the Second Division for the first time after winning the Fourth Division title in 1974–75 and the Third Division title in 1976–77, only to suffer two relegations in three seasons.

Promoted out of the Fourth Division under the stewardship of Ian Greaves in 1985–86, they went on to win the Associate Members' Cup in 1986–87. Mansfield were however relegated in 1991 and promoted again in 1991–92, only to suffer an immediate relegation the following season. They won promotion once again in 2001–02, but were relegated to League Two in 2003 and lost their Football League status with a further relegation in 2008. They spent five seasons in the Conference until they were promoted back into the Football League after winning the Conference in 2012–13 following investment from new club owner John Radford. They were promoted from League Two in the 2023–24 season.

Nicknamed 'The Stags', they play in a blue and yellow kit. Since 1919, Mansfield have played at One Call Stadium, which is now an all-seater stadium with a capacity of 10,022. Their main rivals are Chesterfield. The club also competes in local derby games against fellow Nottinghamshire club Notts County.

== History ==
=== Early years ===
Mansfield Town have played at Field Mill (currently known as One Call Stadium) since the end of the First World War.

Mansfield Town was formed under the name of Mansfield Wesleyans in 1897, the name of the club coming from the local Wesleyan church. The club played friendlies up until the 1902–03 season, when it joined the Mansfield and District Amateur League. When the league dropped its amateur tag in 1906, the church abandoned the club, which changed its name to Mansfield Wesley and moved into the Notts and District League.

In the summer of 1910, despite having lost the previous season to Mansfield Mechanics in the second qualifying round of the FA Cup, the team changed its name to Mansfield Town (much to the disgust of the Mechanics). In the following years, Mansfield Town swapped between the Notts and District League, Central Alliance League and Notts and Derbyshire League, before World War I brought a halt to proceedings.

After the war, Mansfield became occupants of the Field Mill ground, after Mansfield Mechanics failed to pay their rent. In 1921, the club was admitted into the Midland Counties League, and celebrated by reaching the sixth qualifying round of the FA Cup twice in a row. The club won the league in 1923–24 and was the runner-up the following season, but on both occasions failed to win election to the Football League.

In 1928–29, Mansfield won the Midland League again, but more famously reached the fourth round proper of the FA Cup, losing 2–0 to First Division club Arsenal, after a cup run which saw them beat Second Division side Wolverhampton Wanderers. However, York City beat the Stags in elections for a League place.

=== Into the Football League ===
In 1931, Mansfield were finally elected to the Southern Section of the Third Division. However, the club struggled to adapt to League surroundings and were frequently in the lower reaches of the table. One of very few highlights in the years before the Second World War was Ted Harston, who scored 55 goals in one season before transferring to Liverpool.

After the war, Mansfield started to see some progress. Lucky to escape the need for re-election when it was decided that no club would be relegated after the 1946–47 season, the Stags started to move up the table. In 1950–51, Mansfield reached the fifth round of the FA Cup and became the first Football League team to complete a 23–game home schedule unbeaten, although missed out on the only Third Division promotion spot.

Chart of Mansfield's yearly table positions in the Football League

On 23 August 1958 Mansfield fielded a Black player, the Jamaican-born Lindy Delapenha, for the first time. He joined from Middlesbrough F.C. where he had spent nine successful seasons. He went on to make 115 League appearances for Mansfield, scoring 27 goals. In 1959–60 the club was relegated to the recently created Fourth Division, before gaining promotion back to the Third Division in 1962–63. This promotion was later tainted by life-time suspensions handed out to players Brian Phillips and Sammy Chapman for bribing opponents, including players of Hartlepools United in a vital match which Mansfield won 4–3. Two seasons later, the club again narrowly missed out on promotion to the Second Division. The season after avoiding relegation due to a points deduction for Peterborough United, Mansfield made another headline-grabbing cup run. Mansfield beat First Division West Ham United 3–0 in the fifth round of the 1968–69 FA Cup, before narrowly losing to Leicester City in the quarter-finals. In 1971–72 Mansfield were relegated, again, to the Fourth Division.

By 1976–77, the club was back in the Third Division, and despite the distraction of a 5–2 FA Cup defeat to Matlock Town, beat Wrexham to the Third Division title. The club went straight back down, and only a good run of form at the end of the 1978–79 season saved Mansfield from a double relegation.

Mansfield won the Football League Trophy in front of 58,000 fans in May 1987, beating Bristol City on penalties after a 1–1 draw. However, the years that followed were inconsistent, with Mansfield becoming a "yo-yo" team between the Third and Fourth Divisions. Also at that time, the controversial Keith Haslam bought the club.

=== 21st century ===
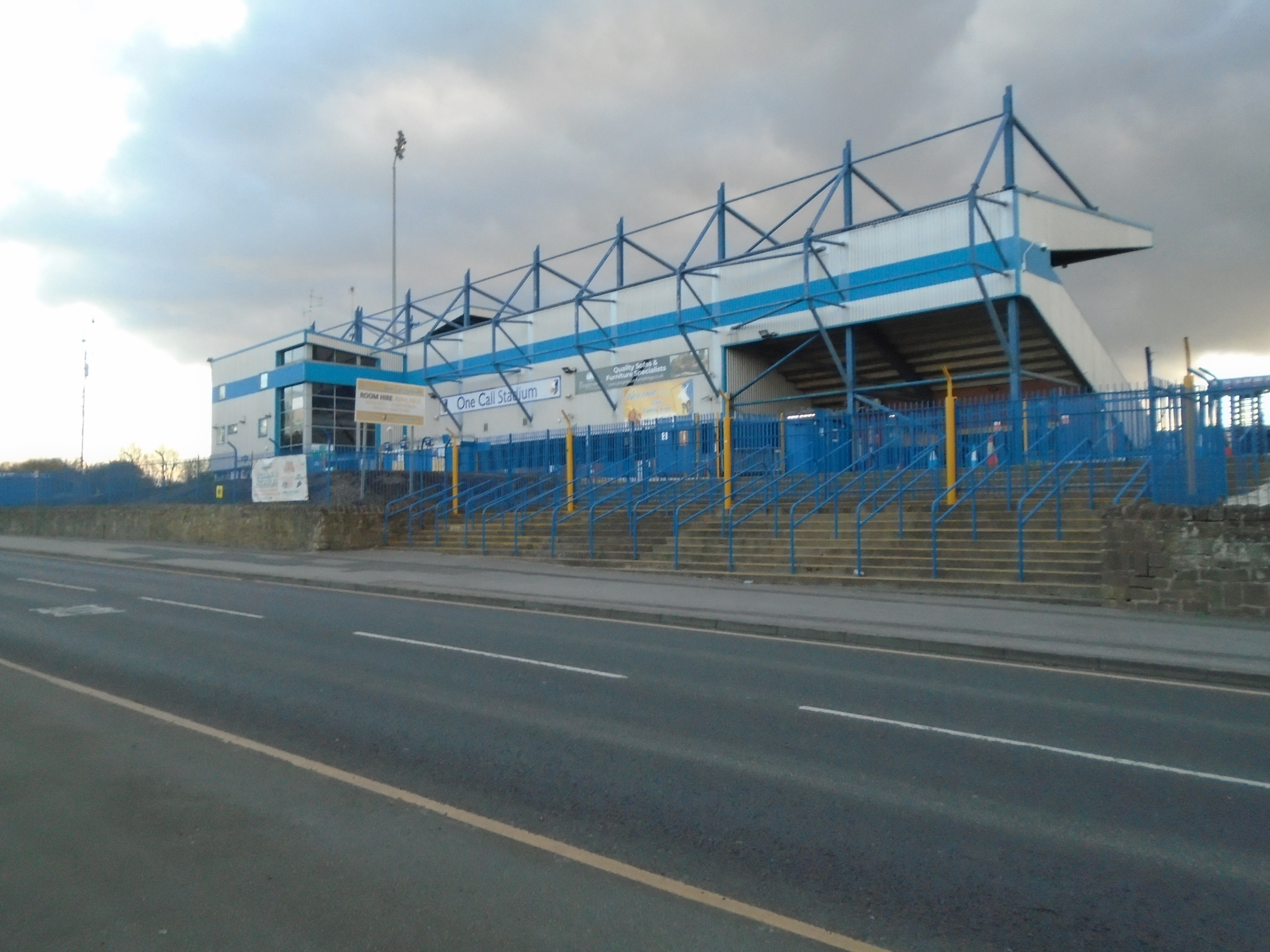
Picture took outside of the stadium in early 2026

In 2001–02, Mansfield were again promoted to the third tier of English football, beating Carlisle United to take third place from Cheltenham Town, who lost at Plymouth Argyle. A poor season in Division Two did not improve with the arrival of Keith Curle as manager, as the club was relegated back to the fourth tier of English football. In 2003–04, Mansfield defeated Northampton Town in a penalty shoot-out in the Division Three play-off semi-finals, but lost to Huddersfield Town on penalties in the final.

In 2007–08, Mansfield's 77-year stay in the Football League came to an end as the club was relegated to the Conference. A fluke goal in a 1–0 loss to rivals Rotherham United in the last home game of the season all but guaranteed relegation. Ugly scenes erupted at the final whistle, with controversial owner Keith Haslam being attacked by fans.

Haslam left the club, with the trio of Perry, Middleton and Saunders purchasing the club (but not the ground) for £1 and installed Billy McEwan as manager. He was replaced after Christmas by David Holdsworth. Holdsworth's less than two-year reign bought little improvement to the club and he was dismissed as manager in November 2010. Duncan Russell led Mansfield to an FA Trophy final appearance in 2010–11, Louis Briscoe scoring a late extra-time winner against Luton Town in the semi-final second leg. However, the Stags lost 1–0 to Darlington at Wembley Stadium in the final after a 120th-minute extra-time goal by Chris Senior. A league position of 12th was not good enough for Russell to keep his job. His replacement, Paul Cox, led Mansfield to their highest Conference finish in his first season. A good run of form after Christmas saw the Stags finish in third in the league, although they lost 2–1 on aggregate to York City after extra time in the promotion play-off semi-final.

An indifferent start to the 2012–13 season left Mansfield lingering around mid-table. One good point to the first half of the season was the club's FA Cup run. In the third round, the Stags faced Premier League side Liverpool. A controversial Luis Suárez goal helped the Reds to a 2–1 victory, but a brave display from the Mansfield team gave the team momentum in the weeks to follow. Following the cup game the Stags won 20 of their last 24 games, including a club record run of 12 consecutive wins, to clinch the Conference Premier title, and promotion back to the Football League. The title was sealed with a 1–0 victory over Wrexham on 20 April 2013.

Mansfield finished their first season back in the Football League in 11th place. In 2018–19, the Stags narrowly missed out on promotion on the final day of the season after a defeat to promotion rivals MK Dons. They lost in the play-off semi-finals to Newport County on penalties. In 2021–22, Mansfield reached the play-offs again but lost 3–0 to Port Vale in the final. In the 2023–24 season, Mansfield were promoted to League One, finishing in 3rd place.

== Ownership ==
The 2006–07 season saw the creation of the "SFFC (Stags Fans for Change)" an organisation aiming for the removal of then owner Keith Haslam from the club. The organisation undertook many projects over the year to get their message over in a different and non-aggressive way. This included hiring a plane to fly over the local derby match with Notts County towing a banner declaring that the club was for sale and calling for Haslam to leave. On 29 November 2007 Haslam rejected a bid from James Derry's consortium and the Mansfield fans pledged to have a TV protest against him on 2 December 2007 against Harrogate Railway Athletic live on the BBC's Match of the Day programme.

In March 2008, it was reported that John Batchelor, a bidder for Mansfield Town, planned to rename the club to Harchester United after the fictional squad from the TV series Dream Team to make the club "more promotable" if his bid were a success. Fans and executives within the club both stated that they would oppose the name change.

Following the club's relegation in 2008, Colin Hancock, then the chairman of Glapwell, emerged as the leading bidder as he agreed to purchase a controlling share of the Stags, Field Mill, and some land surrounding the stadium from Haslam.

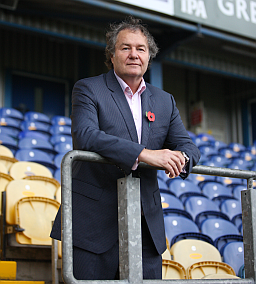
Radford on the terraces in 2016

However, three businessmen who are also Mansfield Town fans, Andrew Perry, Andrew Saunders and Steve Middleton, bought the club from Keith Haslam for an undisclosed fee, but they were still renting the stadium from him. At the start of the 2010–11 season Mansfield were bought by John Radford.

On 2 December 2010 the club was locked out of Field Mill in a dispute over unpaid rent. Since returning to Field Mill after securing a lease on the ground for a further year and a half, John Radford began to seek a way by which the club would once again own Field Mill. It was reported that Keith Haslam had rejected an offer from Radford for Field Mill.

On 1 March 2012, Chairman John Radford purchased the ground from Keith Haslam. Since then, 1 March is considered "Amber Day" at the club to commemorate the retrieval of Mansfield's stadium. In April 2012, Radford changed the stadium's name from "Field Mill" to the "One Call Stadium" for sponsorship reasons.

=== Rivalries ===
The 2003 Football Fans Census indicates that Mansfield's biggest rivalries are with Chesterfield and Notts County, with Doncaster Rovers tertiary rivals. Bad blood between Chesterfield and Mansfield has links to the miners' strike. Fixtures between Town and County are referred to as Nottinghamshire derbies. More recently, a lesser rivalry has grown with Grimsby Town as well as Lincoln City.

=== Club colours ===
During the Wesleyans era, Mansfield played in chocolate and sky blue shirts, firstly striped until 1902, and then halved. Upon assuming the Mansfield Town moniker, the club switched to red shirts, white shorts, and black socks, though this identity only lasted the 1910–11 season. A five-year stint in black and white quartered shirts with black shorts and socks followed before the club closed down.

Upon their return in 1919, Town introduced their now-familiar blue and amber club colour scheme, initially in halves. Becoming a league side in 1931 coincided with a change to pale blue shirts with white shorts, which the club wore until October 1934, when the blue and amber returned (albeit in quarters for the remainder of the 1934–35 season). They continued to wear this colour combination in various arrangements (including a blue shirt with amber sleeves from January 1948) for two decades. From 1954 to 1961 Town played in white shirts and black shorts, before amber shirts with blue shorts returned for seven years. All-blue with amber trim was selected in 1968, before a new look of white shirts with blue shorts was introduced in 1970.

1974 saw the classic colour scheme return, and though the composition might vary, amber and blue has reigned ever since. The only exception to this was the centenary kit worn in the 1997–98 season, which was a retro kit design styled after Mansfield Wesleyans' first, albeit with sky blue shorts and socks.

Selection of Mansfield Town home kits through history
Wesleyans' original kit 1897–c. 1900. Worn with sky blue shorts 1997–98	The first kit of the "Mansfield Town" era. Worn in the 1910–11 season	Black and white quartered kit worn from 1911 until closedown in 1916	Kit adopted upon election to the Football League. Worn 1931–1934	The Stags wore white shirts and black shorts from 1954 to 1961	The traditional club colours of Mansfield Town, as worn from 1974 to 1979

=== Kit suppliers and shirt sponsors ===
The following tables detail the shirt sponsors and kit suppliers of Mansfield by year:

Kit suppliers
Period	Supplier
1975–1976	Umbro
1976–1977	Bukta
1977–1983	Umbro
1983–1986	Lowfields
1986–1988	5D Togs
1988–1990	Scoreline
1990–1992	Ribero
1992–1993	Hero
1993–1994	Pelada
1994–1995	Activity
1995–1996	In-house production
1996–1998	Beaver
1998–2000	Russell Athletic
2000–2004	In-house production
2004–2006	Garman
2006–2008	Carlotti
2008–2010	Canterbury of New Zealand
2010–2013	Erreà
2013–2023	Surridge Sports
2023–2025	Castore
2025–Present	Erreà

Front of shirt sponsors
Period	Sponsor
1983–1987	Evinson's Ford
1987–1991	Mansfield Brewery (1987–1989: Marksman Lager; 1989–1990: Mansfield Beers; 1990–1991: Mansfield Bitter)
1991–1992	Gunthorpe Textiles
1992–1993	GTC
1993–1995	Abacus Lighting
1995–1998	Mansfield Brewery (Mansfield Bitter)
1999	AD-MAG
2000–2001	Thorworld
2001–2003	Vodka Kick
2003–2007	Perry Electrical
2007–2009	ASPL
2009–2011	Hymas Homes
2011–2013	Greene King IPA
2013–present	One Call Insurance

Sleeve sponsors
Period	Sponsor
2023–2024	Food Hub
2024–2025	Source Travel
2025-Present	Relate Consultancies

== Players ==
=== Current squad ===
As of 1 September 2026

Note: Flags indicate national team as defined under FIFA eligibility rules; some limited exceptions apply. Players may hold more than one non-FIFA nationality.

No.	Pos.	Nation	Player
1	GK	ENG	Liam Roberts
2	DF	ENG	Kyle Knoyle
3	DF	IRL	Stephen McLaughlin
4	DF	WAL	Elliott Hewitt
5	DF	IRL	Ryan Sweeney (captain)
6	DF	ENG	Baily Cargill
7	FW	GRN	Lucas Akins
8	MF	ENG	Luke Bolton
9	FW	SKN	Jordan Bowery
10	MF	ENG	George Maris
13	MF	JAM	Jon Russell
14	FW	ENG	Michael Smith
16	MF	ENG	Liam Thompson

No.	Pos.	Nation	Player
17	FW	IRL	David McGoldrick
18	FW	ENG	Rhys Oates
19	FW	WAL	Tyler Roberts
20	DF	ENG	Frazer Blake-Tracy
21	GK	ENG	Harry Lewis
22	MF	GUY	Nathan Moriah-Welsh
23	DF	ENG	Deji Oshilaja
24	MF	SCO	Regan Hendry
25	MF	ENG	Louis Reed
28	MF	ENG	Ollie Taylor
33	MF	ENG	George Abbott (on loan from Tottenham Hotspur)
39	DF	ENG	Owen Dodgson (on loan from Stockport County)

==== Out on loan ====
Note: Flags indicate national team as defined under FIFA eligibility rules; some limited exceptions apply. Players may hold more than one non-FIFA nationality.

No.	Pos.	Nation	Player

=== Under-21s ===
Note: Flags indicate national team as defined under FIFA eligibility rules; some limited exceptions apply. Players may hold more than one non-FIFA nationality.

No.	Pos.	Nation	Player
30	MF	ENG	Finn Flanagan
32	DF	ENG	Elliot Hartman
34	DF	ENG	Taylor Anderson
—	GK	DOM	Anthony Nunez

No.	Pos.	Nation	Player
—	DF	ENG	Cormac Maher
—	MF	ENG	Charlie Carter
—	FW	ENG	Jack Goodman

=== Former players ===
For details of former players, see List of Mansfield Town F.C. players

== Club officials ==
=== Boardroom ===
As of 8 September 2023

- Owner/Chairman: John Radford
- Chief Executive Officer: Carolyn Radford
- Financial Director: James Beachill
- Legal Director: Bill Broughton
- Director: Steve Hymas
- Director: Mark Burton
- Director: Paul Brown
- Director: Sid Pepper
- Club secretary: Diane Ceney

=== First team staff ===
As of 8 September 2023

- Manager: Nigel Clough
- Assistant manager: Gary Crosby
- First team coach: Andy Garner
- Strength & conditioning coach: David Waldie
- Physio: Tom Whittamore
- Goalkeeper coach: Adam Collin
- Head of recruitment: Simon Clough
- Senior performance analyst: Matt Ash
- Academy manager: Richard Cooper

=== Managerial history ===
As of match played 20 October 2026

Name	Nationality	From	To	Record				
Name	Nationality	From	To	P	W	D	L	Win %
Teddy Davison	(England)	1926	1928	2	1	0	1	50.00
Jack Hickling	(England)	1928	1933	110	30	25	55	27.27
Charlie Bell	(Scotland)	1935	1935	31	8	7	16	25.81
Harold Wightman	(England)	1936	1936	19	7	5	7	36.84
Harry Parkes	(England)	May 1936	January 1938	68	29	14	25	42.65
Roy Goodall	(England)	1945	1949	139	47	36	56	33.81
Freddie Steele	(England)	1949	1951	123	61	31	31	49.59
George Jobey	(England)	1952	1953	70	28	17	25	40.00
Stan Mercer	(England)	1953	1955	77	32	16	29	41.56
Charlie Mitten	(England)	February 1956	June 1958	115	49	22	44	42.61
Sam Weaver	(England)	June 1958	January 1960	73	22	17	34	30.14
Raich Carter	(England)	January 1960	March 1963	151	63	23	65	41.72
Tommy Cummings	(England)	March 1963	1964	201	87	40	74	43.28
Tommy Eggleston	(England)	1967	1970	157	59	38	60	37.58
Jock Basford	(England)	1970	1971	66	21	22	23	31.82
Danny Williams	(England)	1971	1974	123	41	42	40	33.33
Dave Smith	(Scotland)	1974	1976	113	54	32	27	47.79
Peter Morris	(England)	1976	1978	83	36	18	29	43.37
Billy Bingham	(Northern Ireland)	February 1978	1979	64	17	23	24	26.56
Mick Jones	(England)	1979	1981	107	37	27	43	34.58
Stuart Boam	(England)	July 1981	January 1983	77	25	15	37	32.47
Ian Greaves	(England)	January 1983	6 February 1989	311	101	99	111	32.48
George Foster	(England)	February 1989	August 1993	217	68	50	99	31.34
Andy King	(England)	August 1993	July 1996	149	51	45	53	34.23
Steve Parkin	(England)	July 1996	1999	143	54	41	48	37.76
Bill Dearden	(England)	18 June 1999	6 January 2002	134	49	28	57	36.57
Stuart Watkiss	(England)	January 2002	December 2002	45	16	5	24	35.56
Keith Curle	(England)	3 December 2002	11 November 2004	104	39	23	42	37.50
Carlton Palmer	(England)	November 2004	September 2005	41	10	15	16	24.39
Peter Shirtliff	(England)	September 2005	December 2006	72	24	19	29	33.33
Paul Holland	(England)	19 December 2006	28 December 2006	3	2	1	0	66.67
Bill Dearden	(England)	28 December 2006	8 March 2008	63	18	13	32	28.57
Paul Holland	(England)	8 March 2008	4 July 2008	12	3	6	3	25.00
Billy McEwan	(Scotland)	4 July 2008	10 December 2008	26	8	6	12	30.77
David Holdsworth	(England)	29 December 2008	18 November 2010	91	37	20	34	40.66
Duncan Russell	(England)	19 November 2010	12 May 2011	36	14	9	13	38.89
Paul Cox	(England)	19 May 2011	21 November 2014	175	78	46	51	44.57
Adam Murray	(England)	21 November 2014	14 November 2016	103	32	27	44	31.07
Steve Evans	(Scotland)	16 November 2016	27 February 2018	76	35	22	19	46.05
David Flitcroft	(England)	1 March 2018	14 May 2019	68	26	25	17	38.24
John Dempster	(Scotland)	14 May 2019	14 December 2019	28	7	11	10	25.00
Graham Coughlan	(Republic of Ireland)	17 December 2019	27 October 2020	27	4	9	14	14.81
Richard Cooper (Interim)	(England)	29 October 2020	5 November 2020	2	0	2	0	0.00
Nigel Clough	(England)	6 November 2020	Present	324	134	84	106	41.36

== Club records ==
Team records

- Record win
  - 9–2 vs. Rotherham United, 27 December 1932 (home) (two 7-goal victories since)
  - 9–2 vs. Harrogate Town, 13 February 2024 (home)
- Record defeat
  - 8–1 vs. Walsall, 19 January 1933 (Away)

Season records

- Most wins
  - 28 – 1974–75, 1976–77 (overall)
  - 30 – 2012–13
- Fewest defeats
  - 6 – 1974–75 (overall)
  - 7 – 2011–12
- Most goals for
  - 108 – 1962–63
- Fewest goals against
  - 38 – 1984–85
- Most points
  - 68 – 1974–75 (2 points per win)
  - 95 – 2012–13 (3 points per win)

Player records

Records for all recognised league and cup competitions

- Most appearances
  - Rod Arnold (1970–71, 1972–1984): 522 games
- Most goals
  - Harry Johnson (1931–1936): 114 goals

Cup records

- Best FA Cup performance: Quarter-finals, 1968–69
- Best EFL Cup performance: Quarter-finals, 1975–76
- Best EFL Trophy performance: Winners, 1986–87
- Best FA Trophy performance: Runners-up, 2010–11

== Honours ==
League

- Third Division (level 3)
  - Champions: 1976–77
- Fourth Division / Third Division / League Two (level 4)
  - Champions: 1974–75
  - 3rd place promotion: 1985–86, 1991–92, 2001–02, 2023–24
  - 4th place promotion: 1962–63
- Conference (level 5)
  - Champions: 2012–13
- Midland League
  - Champions: 1923–24, 1924–25, 1928–29
- Central Alliance
  - Champions: 1919–20

Cup

- Associate Members' Cup
  - Winners: 1986–87
- FA Trophy
  - Runners-up: 2010–11
