= Duncan Russell =

English football manager (1958–2017)

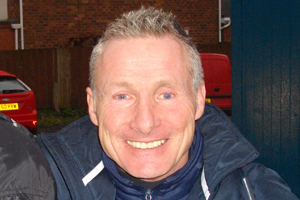

Personal information
- Full name: Duncan Russell
- Date of birth: 12 March 1958
- Place of birth: London, England
- Date of death: 18 August 2017 (aged 59)
- Place of death: Derby, Derbyshire, England

Managerial career
- Years: Team
- 2010: Mansfield Town (caretaker)
- 2010–2011: Mansfield Town
- 2013: Hucknall Town

Duncan Russell (12 March 1958 – 18 August 2017) was an English football manager who was in charge of Conference National side Mansfield Town and Hucknall Town.

== Career ==
=== Coaching ===
Russell began his coaching career at Derby County and subsequently joined Walsall where he enjoyed promotion to the old Division One in 2001. Promotions were also gained at Wolverhampton Wanderers in 2003 and at MK Dons when they also completed the double by claiming the Football League Trophy in 2008. He followed Paul Ince to Blackburn Rovers soon after and has coached some of England's top players in recent times including Matthew Le Tissier and Paul Gascoigne.

=== Management ===
In May 2010 Russell joined Mansfield Town as assistant manager to David Holdsworth. Following Holdsworth's sacking in November of that year, Russell was placed as caretaker manager, before taking control of the team on a permanent basis. Russell's contract was not renewed at the end of the 2010–11 season and he subsequently left Field Mill.Duncan's final game as Mansfield Town manager came at Wembley Stadium in the FA Trophy Final on 7 May 2011 which Mansfield lost extremely late in extra time to Darlington 1–0.

On 30 May 2013 he was appointed manager of Hucknall Town, although less than six weeks later he left the club as he was not prepared to drop two leagues.

=== Death ===
Duncan died on 18 August 2017 age 59 in a Derby Hospice from cancer.

== Statistics ==
=== Managerial stats ===
Competitive matches only – Correct as of 17 July 2013

Team	Nat	From	To	Record							
Team	Nat	From	To	P	W	D	L	GF	GA	GD	W%
Mansfield Town (caretaker)	(England)	19 November 2010	21 December 2010	3	2	1	0	9	3	+6	66.7
Mansfield Town	(England)	21 December 2010	12 May 2011	15	6	5	4	31	29	+2	40.0
Hucknall Town	(England)	30 May 2013	17 July 2013	0	0	0	0	0	0	+0	—
Total				18	8	6	4	40	32	+8	44.4
