= Field Mill =

Mansfield football stadium

Coordinates: 53°08′17″N 1°12′02″W

One Call Stadium
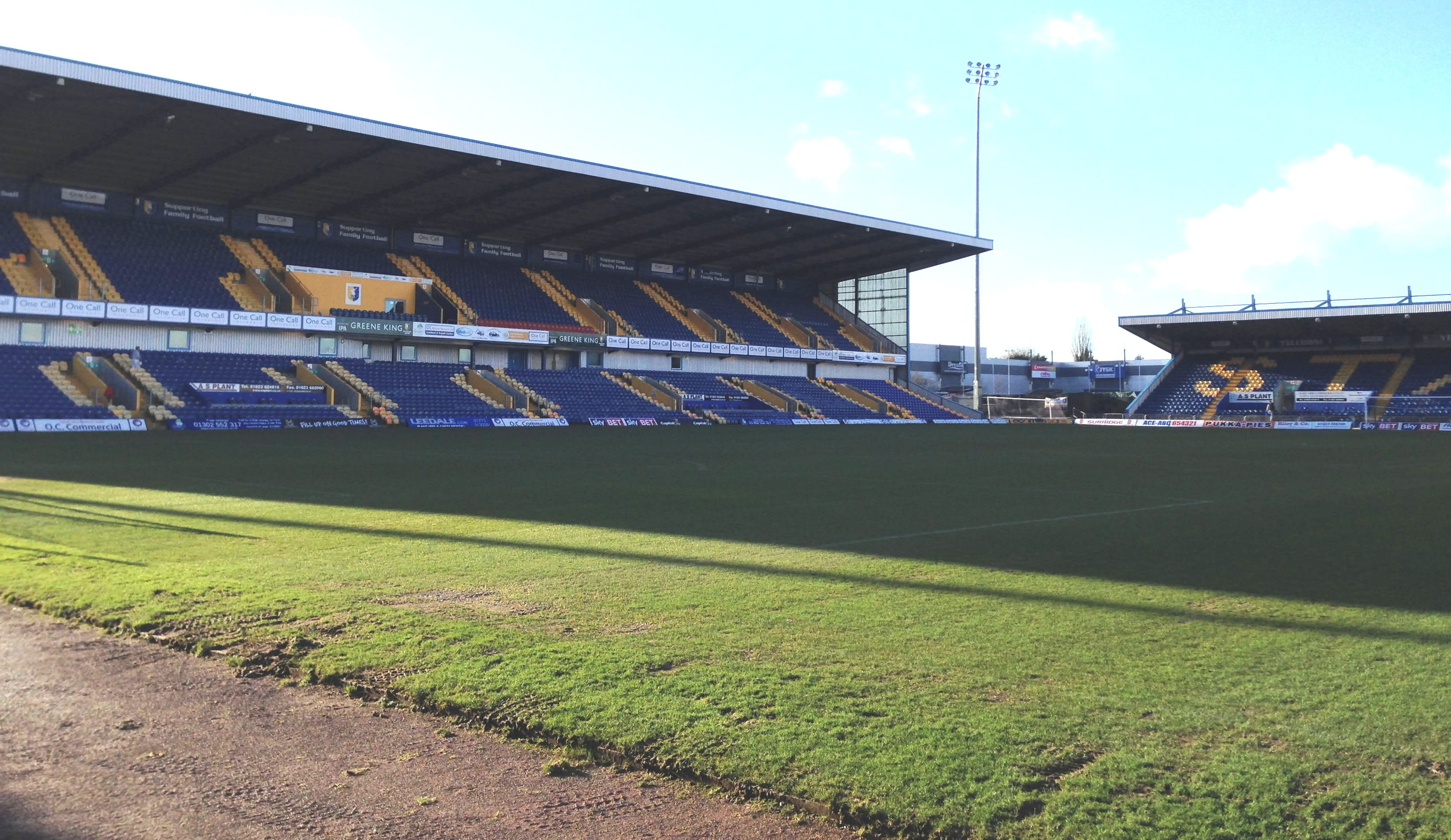
- The old West Stand location, rebuilt and named as Ian Greaves Stand, with the smaller North Stand
- Interactive map of One Call Stadium
- Full name: One Call Stadium
- Location: Quarry Lane, Mansfield, Nottinghamshire, NG18 5DA
- Owner: John Radford
- Capacity: 10,022
- Surface: Grass
- Scoreboard: Yes (2009)
- Record attendance: 24,467 (v. Nottingham Forest); 10 January 1953
- Field size: 114 x 70 yards

Construction
- Built: 1850
- Renovated: 1999–2001

Tenants
- Mansfield Town (1919–present); Mansfield Marksman (1984–1986); Mansfield Mechanics (1912–1916)

Field Mill, currently known as One Call Stadium for sponsorship reasons, is a football ground in Mansfield, Nottinghamshire, England, and the home of Mansfield Town Football Club.

It is the oldest ground in the Football League, hosting football since 1861, although some reports date it back as far as 1850. The stadium has a capacity of 10,000 when fully open, but due to safety restrictions and the closure of the North stand, it can presently hold just 7,276. The stadium once hosted a pop concert under the previous owner, Keith Haslam, but the sale included a clause preventing use for non-sports events until 2032. The ground is now fully owned by John and Carolyn Radford after a series of payment installments from 2012 were concluded in early 2019.

== History ==
=== Before Mansfield Town ===
'Field Mill' was originally the name of a large, stone-built, water-powered textile-mill with its own mill pond. The mill was located directly across the road from the present ground, being one of several situated along the River Maun water course supplied from a nearby reservoir. The mill was demolished in 1925.

The club site on Quarry Lane was originally used as a recreational area for employees of the Greenhalgh & Sons Works, who rented the surrounding areas from the Duke of Portland for their cotton-doubling business. One of the Greenhalgh sons was Harwood Greenhalgh, a Mansfield-born footballer who played for Notts County, and represented England in the first ever international football match.

The Greenhalgh's team played at Field Mill under various incarnations, including 'Greenhalgh's F.C.', 'Field Mill Football Club' and 'Mansfield Greenhalgh'. A team representing Greenhalgh & Sons also played cricket at the ground for many years, while the late nineteenth century saw athletics and cycle-racing on Quarry Lane. An 1894 merger with Mansfield Town (no relation to the current club) to form Mansfield F.C. saw Field Mill become almost exclusively a football ground.

The ground was used by Mansfield Mechanics FC from 1912 to 1916.

=== The home of Mansfield Town ===
Mansfield Town first started playing matches there in the 1919–20 season, however for the first two years it was also used as a cricket ground by the Mansfield branch of the National Federation of Discharged and Disabled ex-Servicemen's Societies (DDSS). In 1921, the DDSS's lease on the ground ran out, and the ground was sold by its owner, the Duke of Portland, on the condition that it would only ever be used for sporting purposes.

The first grandstand was erected in 1922 along the length of the west side of the ground, with the other three sides mounds formed from ash from nearby coal mines, all completed by 1926. In 1929, using the money from the cup run of the previous year, a covered stand was built on the Bishop Street side, occupying a similar position to the Bishop Street Stand of today. The first terracing was built during the 1930s from railway sleepers, and lasted 20 years.

Floodlights were installed and officially switched on by Billy Wright on 5 October 1961 before the Football League Cup game against Cardiff City.

Shortly after World War Two, concrete terracing and a PA system were introduced. The club bought land to the West side of the ground in the mid-1950s, just before the supporters' club funded the building of the new North Stand, at a cost of £30,000.

In the 1960s a new grandstand was erected on the west side of the ground after being purchased from Hurst Park Racecourse in Surrey. The stand itself cost £30,000, although the final amount spent was considerably more than this once the cost of transportation and reconstruction is taken into account. The stand was first used in 1966, but it was not fully completed until 1971.

Between 1984 and 1986, Field Mill was home to a rugby league team called Mansfield Marksman.

The old scoreboard at Field Mill

After plans to relocate to a new all-seater stadium were scrapped, work began in July 1999 to completely modernise Field Mill. The North Stand, Quarry Lane End and West Stand were completely demolished and new stands built in their place, including a two tier stand on the west side of the ground. The redeveloped all-seater stadium was officially opened by John Prescott on 28 July 2001, six months after work had been completed.

In July 2005, safety officials temporarily restricted Field Mill's capacity to 5,000 when fire safety certificates could not be located. The ground's capacity was again reduced in May 2007, from 9,368 to 4,684, when Nottinghamshire County Council, who enforced the reduction, cited a poor standard of stewarding and a lack of a proactive approach to safety. In July 2007 the capacity was raised to 6,553 following an inspection from safety officials, but was reduced back to 4,684 in September after visiting Chesterfield supporters were given too many tickets by mistake. Field Mill's capacity was then increased to 5,457, and in January 2008 further increased to 7,300 for the FA Cup tie against Middlesbrough after a problem with the turnstiles and other issues were resolved.

In early 2010, the Mansfield Town announced plans to allow the ground to be used to hold concerts and other events to raise non-matchday income. On 22 August 2010, Westlife brought their Where We Are Now Tour to the ground. The event was hailed a success despite not selling out and poor weather conditions affecting uncovered fans. No further concerts were announced.

In December 2010, Mansfield Town were evicted from the ground by their landlord Keith Haslam following a dispute over unpaid rent. The club looked for alternative grounds at which to play their home games in the Conference National, including Alfreton Town's Impact Arena and Ilkeston Town's New Manor Ground. However, their first home game after the eviction was postponed in any event due to the freezing weather.

The owner John Radford confirmed, when announcing the stadium-purchase in 2012, that a clause in the sale precluded any use except for sports events.

== Stands ==
Ian Greaves Stand

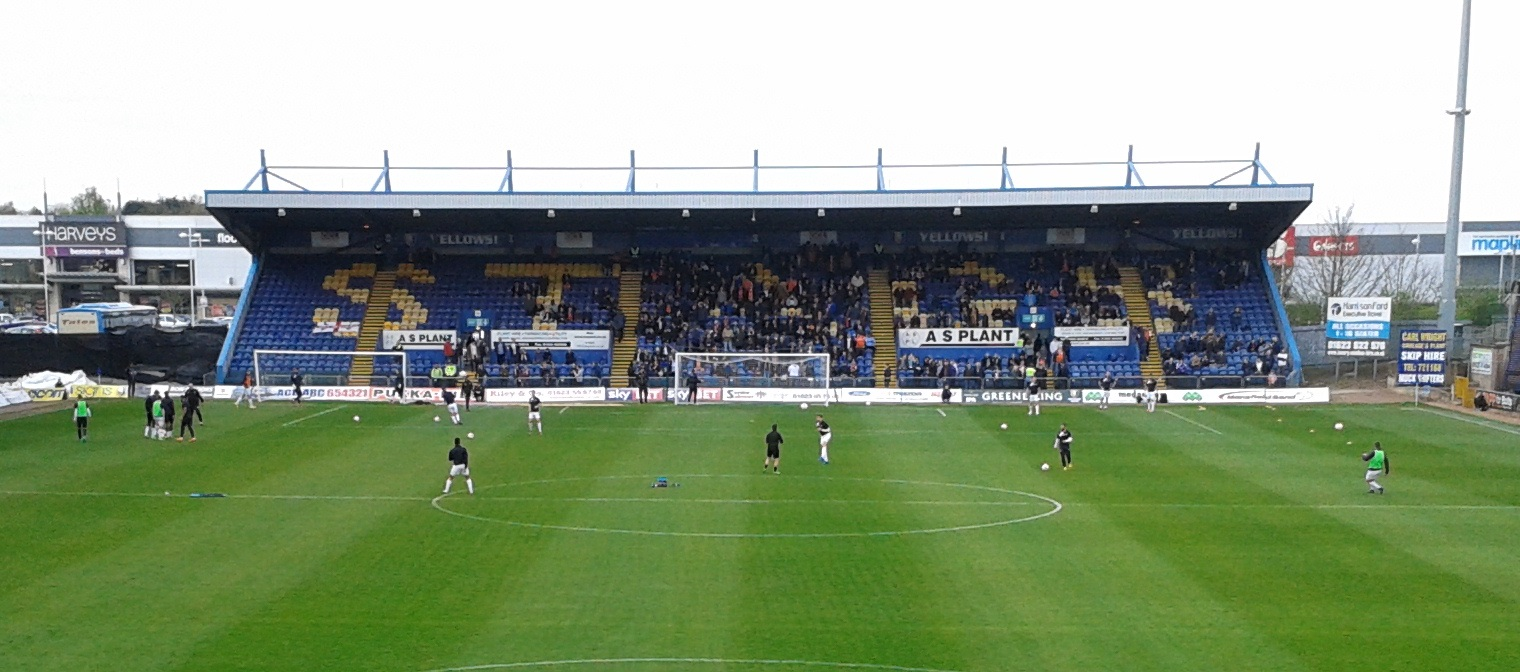
North Stand

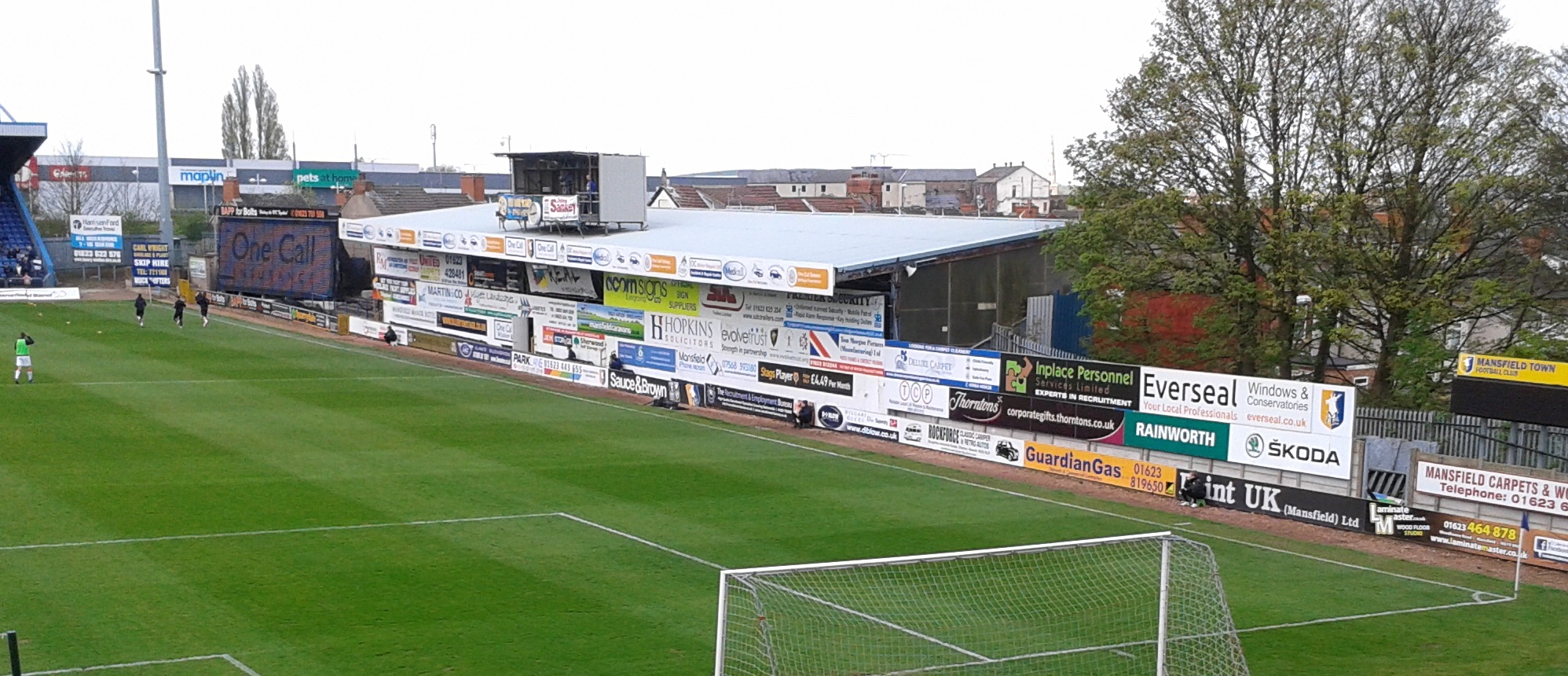
Bishop Street Stand in 2017 obscured by advertising hoardings

The Ian Greaves Stand – formerly known as the West Stand, is the largest with upper and lower tiers, and executive seating. The stand has a capacity of 5,417 (2,764 in the upper tier, and 2,509 in the lower tier). The dugouts were moved to the front of this stand in late 2016, following a request from then-new manager Steve Evans, although this impeded the view of the lower-tier seats (Block D & E).

Quarry Lane End – behind the South goal, housing the home fans, with a capacity of 1,968. The players' tunnel is in the corner of this stand adjacent to the old West Stand.

North Stand – behind the opposite goal from the Quarry Lane End, this was traditionally the home terrace although safety issues meant this would swap with the Quarry Lane End and become the away stand. Capacity of 1,910.

Bishop Street Stand – this stand, which runs along the side of the pitch opposite the old West Stand, was condemned prior to 2006 and was boarded up to prevent access. Mansfield District Council gave planning consent for redevelopment in 2002. There were old plans to build a 2,800 capacity stand including new dressing rooms and television facilities.

In 2024, needing additional fan capacity, Mansfield Town FC took on a new director, Mansfield-based businessman Sid Pepper who has a lifelong background in structural steel fabrications. Pepper has overseen renovation of the existing stand and terracing, albeit on a smaller scale than planned due to limited site dimensions, ground-stability problems and compliance with local Safety Advisory Group (SAG) requirements. Pepper released several video updates on the club's YouTube channel; as of January 2025, foundation problems had to be overcome needing pilings before new concrete could be poured to achieve new foundations, one-level floors, a toilets suite and also ensure adequate-width access corridors.

In August 2025, after creating a new floor structure and installation of seating for 727 spectators, the stand opened early in the 2025–2026 season.

== Training areas ==
The stadium has two adjacent training pitches, but the players also used a fenced-off area of a nearby Mansfield District Council park, arranged by the then-Mayor, Tony Egginton, to the annoyance of local park users.

The football club has established a dedicated training facility approximately two miles away, named Radford & Hymas Academy, after two of the directors. The pitch is all-weather 3G astroturf, with spectator areas and a changing pavilion.

== Other uses ==
=== Hotel projects ===
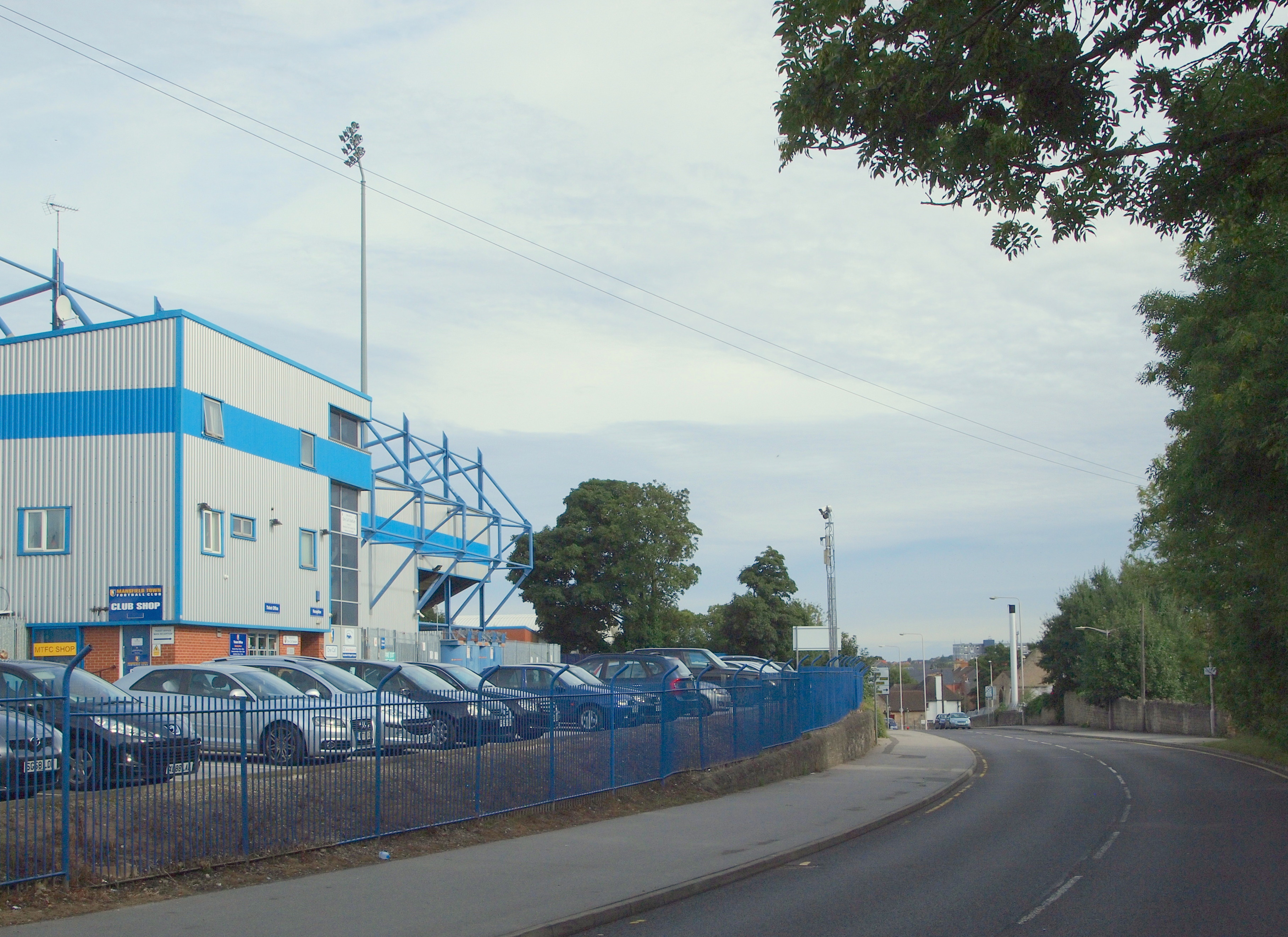
The site of a proposed new hotel, close to Quarry Lane

In early 2018, owner John Radford announced a business proposal to establish a six-floor hotel at the club's stadium, in part replacing the existing Quarry Lane end infrastructure, in conjunction with an international brand. No formal planning application had been submitted to Mansfield District Council at the time of discussions at the club's ground, but a later application was authorised by the council in July 2018.

=== Greyhound racing ===
Greyhound racing at Field Mill lasted three years from 1928 until 1931. During March 1928 plans to add a greyhound track around the football pitch were drawn up and by mid May the track was complete. The track was very basic but did run under the National Greyhound Racing Club (NGRC) rules of racing starting on 26 May 1928.

In 1929 the NGRC banned the track after the management fall foul of the regulations that included the refusal to comply with the NGRC stewards. The greyhound racing continued as an independent (unaffiliated to a governing body) until 17 October 1931.

=== Rugby league ===
A professional rugby league club, Mansfield Marksman, was set up in Mansfield in 1984, playing at Field Mill for their first two seasons. Declining attendances meant the arrangement wasn't financially viable, and the club relocated to North Street in Alfreton in 1986.
