= Sam Hughes (footballer) =

English footballer (born 1997)

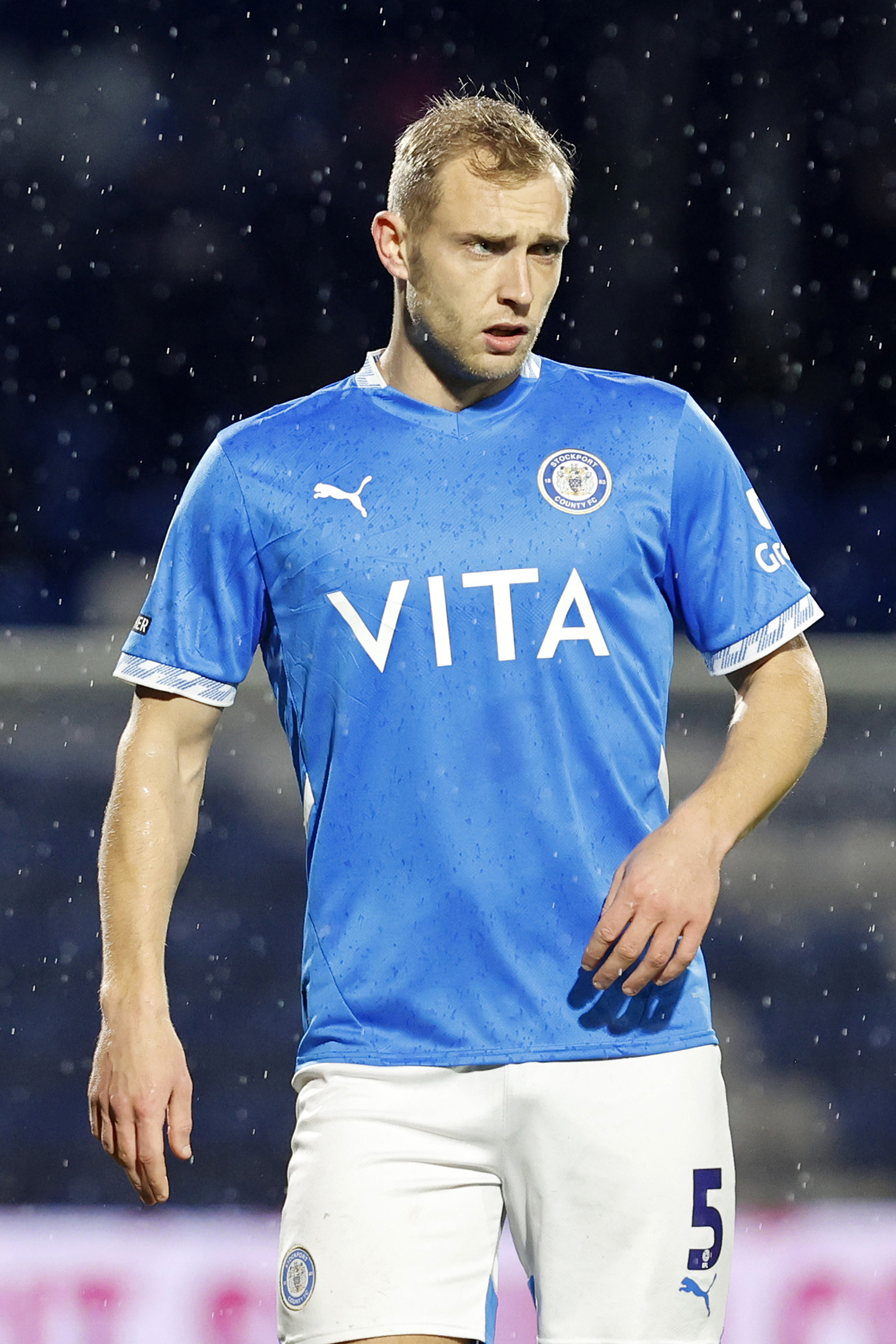
- Sam Hughes with Stockport County in 2024

Personal information
- Full name: Samuel Joseph Hughes
- Date of birth: 15 April 1997 (age 29)
- Place of birth: West Kirby, England
- Height: 1.87 m (6 ft 2 in)
- Position: Defender

Team information
- Current team: Peterborough United
- Number: 5

Youth career
- Ashville
- Wirral Schoolboys
- –2012: West Kirby Wasps
- 2012–2015: Chester

Senior career*
Years	Team	Apps	(Gls)
2015–2017	Chester	55	(5)
2015	→ Witton Albion (loan)	3	(0)
2017–2022	Leicester City	0	(0)
2019–2020	→ Salford City (loan)	8	(0)
2020	→ Burton Albion (loan)	14	(2)
2021–2022	→ Burton Albion (loan)	4	(1)
2022–2024	Burton Albion	88	(3)
2024–2025	Stockport County	8	(0)
2025	→ Peterborough United (loan)	19	(1)
2025–	Peterborough United	1	(0)
- * Club domestic league appearances and goals as of 18:10, 31 October 2026 (UTC)

Samuel Joseph Hughes (born 15 April 1997) is an English footballer who plays as a defender for EFL League One side Peterborough United.

Hughes began his senior career with Chester after joining their youth system in 2012. Following a short loan with Witton Albion, he broke into the first-team in the 2015–16 season. He became the youngest ever captain for Chester and was inducted in their team of the decade, before leaving for Leicester City in 2017. He played regularly for their development team, and was loaned to Salford City in 2019. In 2020, he was loaned to Burton Albion, but his loan was cut short after he suffered a knee injury. He returned to Burton on loan in 2021, but would not play until he recovered from injury in January 2022. His loan was made permanent later that month. He won the Burton Player of the Year award in the 2022–23 season. He left for Stockport County following the expiry of his contract in 2024. However, he struggled for gametime, and joined Peterborough United on loan in January 2025. The loan was made permanent in the summer of that year.

== Career ==
=== Early career and Chester ===
During his career, Hughes played for his hometown teams Ashville, Wirral Schoolboys and West Kirby Wasps, where he was managed by his father, before joining Chester in 2012, at the age of 15. He joined the Chester academy following a trial. After an impressive 2015 pre-season, manager Jon McCarthy praised his progress, and Hughes was signed with Chester senior team that July.

==== 2015–16 season: Breakthrough ====
He made his senior debut on 12 September in a 2–0 defeat to Tranmere Rovers. In November, he was briefly transferred to Division One North side Witton Albion for one-month loan, returning to Chester following 5 appearances. On 16 February 2016, he made his first start for Chester in a 3–0 win over Altrincham. He signed a contract extension in March. He scored his first league goals for Chester on 8 March 2016, scoring a brace in an 8–2 win over Aldershot Town. Hughes was heavily involved with the team, although a concussion meant that he missed the last three games of the season. He finished his debut season with 19 appearances and 2 goals, including a run of 12 starts.

==== 2016–17 season: Establishment in first team ====
"It's a massive moment for me, I didn't expect it one little bit to be honest. The gaffer told me on Thursday after training and said he wanted me to be captain. I am very proud and privileged to be given the opportunity, it's a massive, massive moment to lead the team out so it was really good."

— Hughes on captaining Chester.

Hughes came on as a substitute on the opening fixture on 6 August 2016, in a 3–0 defeat to Gateshead. He scored his first goal of the season on 17 September 2016, in a 1–0 win over Braintree Town. Jon McCarthy praised Hughes for his performance after the match. Hughes formed a defensive partnership with Ryan Astles, and had a run of seven clean sheets in a row. During the January transfer window, Chester rejected an offer from Barnsley for Hughes, which he found "frustrating". On 3 March 2017, he captained Chester in a 3–2 defeat against Tranmere, making him the youngest captain in Chester's history at age 19.

He finished the season with 39 appearances and 3 goals, winning the CFU Player of the Season chosen among Chester players and voted by the fans of the club. By the end of the 2010s decade, he was inducted into Chester's Team of the Decade, in total making 64 appearances and scoring 8 goals with Chester.

=== Leicester City ===
As his contract was expiring in the summer, Chester offered Hughes a new contract, he looked to "explore" his options with interest from Championship clubs. He eventually chose Premier League club Leicester City in July 2017, signing a three-year contract with Hughes to play in their development squad for an undisclosed fee in compensation—although The Leader newspaper reported the fee to be around £130,000 including add-ons. The fee was the biggest in Chester's history after reformation. Leicester signed Hughes to play in their development squad. After suffering an injury in pre-season and recovering, he quickly became a regular for the development squad. He had a successful first season with Leicester, captaining the development team and also being the top-scorer despite playing centre-back. He also made the bench on two occasions for the first-team, although was an unused substitute. In the summer of 2018, he suffered a stress fracture in his lower back and was predicted to be out for three-and-a-half months, until October, however, he would not return on the pitch until February 2019 for a 1–0 defeat to Derby County.

==== Loan spells ====
While still with Leicester, Hughes joined newly promoted League Two side Salford City on a season-long loan in September 2019. He made his debut on 7 September in a 2–2 draw to Morecambe. He was recalled by Leicester in January following 10 appearances in all competitions for Salford.

He extended his contract with Leicester in the summer of 2020. On 9 October 2020, Hughes was loaned to EFL League One club Burton Albion until January 2021. He made his full debut the following day in a 2–0 defeat to Plymouth Argyle. Hughes faced a red card after picking up two yellow cards in a 2–0 defeat to Hull City on 14 November.

He scored his first goal for Burton in a 4–2 win against Charlton Athletic on 24 November, and by that time has formed a partnership with fellow defender Michael Bostwick. On 19 December, Hughes was substituted off early in a 3–1 defeat against Doncaster Rovers. After a scan, it was revealed that Hughes had suffered a long-term knee injury, and would return to Leicester for the remainder of the season for treatment. Hughes had made 14 appearances and scored twice before his loan was cut short.

On 31 August 2021, it was announced that Hughes had returned to Burton on loan, while still not ready to play but at his final stage of rehabilitation. He started his first match for Burton in his second loan spell on 15 January 2022, in a 3–1 win over Gillingham in place of Conor Shaughnessy. It was also his first appearance in over a year, and was hailed by manager Jimmy Floyd Hasselbaink for settling in quickly.

=== Burton Albion ===
After making four appearances during his loan, Hughes got transferred to Burton on a two-and-a-half-year deal on 31 January 2022. He made 21 appearances with 1 goal for Burton in the 2021–22 season, and also had a good disciplinary record with only one yellow card.

Hughes' first appearance of the 2022–23 season came in the opening match on 6 August 2022 played against Bristol Rovers, which ended in a 4–0 defeat. He scored his first goal of the season on 25 October in a 2–1 loss against Bolton Wanderers. On 26 December, he scored again in a 3–0 win over Lincoln City, playing the entire match with an ankle injury. Due to his injury he was predicted to spend three months in rehabilitation, but made his return sooner on 28 January 2023 as a starting player in a 2–0 victory over Oxford United. At the end of the season, Hughes had scored 3 times and made 49 appearances, the most he had ever made in a season. He was also named as Burton's Player of the Year, with a club record 40% of the votes.

Hughes started the 2023–24 season opener on 5 August 2023, in a 2–0 defeat to Blackpool. He sustained a calf injury in October, and made his return on 28 November in a 2–0 loss against Portsmouth. On 10 January 2024, in a 2–1 defeat against Blackpool in the EFL Trophy, Hughes picked up a knock and was substituted off in the first half. He would not play again until 23 March, coming on as a substitute for Aristote Nsiala in a 1–0 defeat against Port Vale. It was also his first appearance under new manager Martin Paterson. The absence of John Brayford saw Hughes captaining the team towards the end of the season. Hughes finished the season with 32 appearances. As his contract was expiring in the summer, Burton offered him a new contract, but Hughes wanted "a fresh start, a new challenge" and chose to depart with in total 117 appearances and 6 goals for Burton.

=== Stockport County ===
On 1 July 2024, it was announced that Hughes had signed for League One club Stockport County on a free transfer, signing a three-year deal. He made his debut in the season opener on 10 August against Cambridge United, which finished in a 2–0 win. He captained Stockport in a 6–1 defeat against Blackburn Rovers played in the EFL Cup on 13 August. However, he came off in the first half after taking a knock. He made his return in September against the Everton U21 in the EFL Trophy, but would not play for another month until starting in a 1–1 draw against Northampton Town in October. By January 2025, Hughes had made only three league starts in eight appearances, and demanded more gametime.

On 16 January 2025, Hughes joined Peterborough United on a loan until the end of the 2024–25 season. His debut came on 18 January, starting in a 0–0 draw against Leyton Orient and helping Peterborough to their first league clean sheet of the season. Team-mate Carl Johnston hailed Hughes on his debut, stating, "Big Sam was a leader out there and a big voice, he was fantastic." Hughes would also captain the side, despite being a loan player. He won the January Player of the Month for Peterborough and scored his first goal for Peterborough on 22 March in a 3–0 win over Charlton Athletic. Hughes was cup-tied as Peterborough won the 2024–25 EFL Trophy by beating Birmingham City 2–0 in the final on 13 April. He finished his loan with 19 appearances and 1 goal.

=== Peterborough United ===
On 24 June 2025, Hughes signed for Peterborough in a three-year deal. He was out at the start of the season however, due to an achilles injury he suffered in pre-season.

== Style of play ==
Hughes was originally a midfielder before being converted to centre-back in the 2016–17 season. He has been described as "a dying breed – an old school centre-half who wants to get stuck in, head it and kick it". Peterborough describes him as "a good organiser, decent in the tackle and a threat from set-pieces." Scottish football manager Darren Ferguson also acclaimed Hughes for his aerial ability and "outstanding" characteristics, standing at 187 cm.

== Career statistics ==
As of match played 8 May 2025

Appearances and goals by club, season and competition
Club	Season	League			FA Cup		League Cup		Other		Total	
Club	Season	Division	Apps	Goals	Apps	Goals	Apps	Goals	Apps	Goals	Apps	Goals
Chester	2015–16	National League	19	2	1	0	—		5 (Note: Two appearances in FA Trophy, three appearances and three goals in Cheshire Senior Cup)	3	25	5
Chester	2016–17	National League	36	3	1	0	—		2 (Note: Appearance(s) in FA Trophy)	0	39	3
Chester	Total		55	5	2	0	0	0	7	3	64	8
Witton Albion (loan)	2015–16	NPL Division One North	3	0	0	0	0	0	2 (Note: One appearance in NPL League Challenge Cup, one appearance in Mid Cheshire Cup)	0	5	0
Leicester City U21	2017–18	—	—		—		—		5 (Note: Appearances in EFL Trophy)	1	5	1
Leicester City U21	2020–21	—	—		—		—		2	0	2	0
Leicester City U21	Total		0	0	0	0	0	0	7	1	7	1
Leicester City	2017–18	Premier League	0	0	0	0	0	0	—		0	0
Leicester City	2018–19	Premier League	0	0	0	0	0	0	—		0	0
Leicester City	Total		0	0	0	0	0	0	0	0	0	0
Salford City (loan)	2019–20	League Two	8	0	0	0	0	0	2	0	10	0
Burton Albion (loan)	2020–21	League One	14	2	1	0	0	0	0	0	15	2
Burton Albion	2021–22	League One	21	1	0	0	0	0	0	0	21	1
Burton Albion	2022–23	League One	42	3	1	0	1	0	5	0	49	3
Burton Albion	2023–24	League One	29	0	0	0	0	0	3	0	32	0
Burton Albion	Total		106	6	2	0	1	0	8	0	117	6
Stockport County	2024–25	League One	8	0	1	0	1	0	3	0	13	0
Peterborough United (loan)	2024–25	League One	19	1	—		—		—		19	1
Career total			195	11	5	0	2	0	29	4	231	16

== Honours ==
Individual

- Burton Albion Player of the Year: 2022–23
