= 2022–23 Burton Albion F.C. season =

Burton Albion
2022–23 season
- Chairman: Ben Robinson
- Manager: Jimmy Floyd Hasselbaink (until 5 September); Dino Maamria (from 6 September)
- Stadium: Pirelli Stadium
- League One: 15th
- FA Cup: Third round
- EFL Cup: First round
- EFL Trophy: Third round

The 2022–23 season is the 73rd season in the existence of Burton Albion Football Club and the club's fifth consecutive season in League One. In addition to the league, they will also compete in the 2022–23 FA Cup, the 2022–23 EFL Cup and the 2022–23 EFL Trophy.

== Transfers ==
=== In ===
Date	Pos	Player	Transferred from	Fee	Ref
1 July 2022 (Note: The transfer was announced on 28 June, and would become official on July 1, once his Oldham Athletic contract expired)	AM	(England) Davis Keillor-Dunn	(England) Oldham Athletic	Free Transfer	
15 July 2022	CF	(Nigeria) Victor Adeboyejo	(England) Barnsley	Free Transfer	
15 July 2022	DM	(England) Calum Butcher	(Scotland) Dundee United	Undisclosed	
8 September 2022	CF	(England) Sam Winnall	(England) Oxford United	Free Transfer	
12 September 2022	LW	(The Gambia) Mustapha Carayol	(England) Gillingham	Free Transfer	
3 October 2022	CF	(Cameroon) Bobby Kamwa	(England) Leeds United	Free Transfer	
7 October 2022	CB	(Jamaica) Adrian Mariappa	(Australia) Macarthur	Free Transfer	
12 November 2022	LW	(England) Joe Dodoo	(England) Doncaster Rovers	Free Transfer	
12 January 2023	CM	(England) Mark Helm	(England) Burnley	Undisclosed	
13 January 2023	GK	(Scotland) Craig MacGillivray	(England) Charlton Athletic	Undisclosed	
1 February 2023	CF	(England) Josh Walker	(England) Dagenham & Redbridge	Undisclosed	
4 February 2023	DM	(Republic of Ireland) Chris McCann	(Republic of Ireland) Shamrock Rovers	Free Transfer	

=== Out ===
Date	Pos	Player	Transferred to	Fee	Ref
30 June 2022	CF	(Wales) Aaron Amadi-Holloway	(England) Hereford	Released	
30 June 2022	CB	(England) Michael Bostwick	(England) Stevenage	Released	
30 June 2022	CF	(Senegal) Oumar Niasse	Unattached	Released	
30 June 2022	CB	(England) Luke Redfern	(England) Stoke City	Released	
30 June 2022	LW	(England) Danny Rowe	Unattached	Released	
15 July 2022	DM	(England) Bryn Morris	(England) Grimsby Town	Free Transfer	
18 July 2022	CB	(Wales) Ryan Leak	(England) Salford City	Undisclosed	
1 September 2022	CF	(Morocco) Gassan Ahadme	(England) Ipswich Town	Undisclosed	
18 January 2023	CB	(Jamaica) Adrian Mariappa	(England) Salford City	Released	
27 January 2023	CF	(Nigeria) Victor Adeboyejo	(England) Bolton Wanderers	Undisclosed	
31 January 2023	CB	(England) Frazer Blake-Tracy	(England) Swindon Town	Undisclosed	
31 January 2023	LW	(England) Joe Dodoo	Unattached	Released	
31 January 2023	AM	(England) Davis Keillor-Dunn	(England) Mansfield Town	Undisclosed	
1 February 2023	GK	(England) Daniel Moore	(England) Leamington	Released	
1 February 2023	MF	(England) Charlie Williams	Unattached	Released	
3 February 2023	DM	(England) Calum Butcher	(Scotland) Motherwell	Mutual Consent	

=== Loans in ===
Date	Pos	Player	Loaned from	On loan until	Ref
11 July 2022	GK	(Finland) Viljami Sinisalo	(England) Aston Villa	3 January 2023 (Note: On 3 January, Sinisalo's loan from Aston Villa was cut short)	
14 July 2022	CM	(Portugal) Quévin Castro	(England) West Bromwich Albion	1 September 2022	(Note: On 1 September, Castro's loan was terminated by mutual consent.)
27 July 2022	CM	(England) Tyler Onyango	(England) Everton	18 January 2023 (Note: On 18 January, Onyango's loan from Everton ended early)	
19 August 2022	CB	(Republic of Ireland) Corrie Ndaba	(England) Ipswich Town	31 January 2023 (Note: On 31 January, Ndaba was recalled to Ipswich)	
1 September 2022	CM	(Wales) Elliot Thorpe	(England) Luton Town	3 January 2023 (Note: On 3 January, Thorpe's loan from Luton was cut short)	
6 January 2023	GK	(Germany) Jordan Amissah	(England) Sheffield United	End of Season	
17 January 2023	LB	(Wales) Zac Ashworth	(England) West Bromwich Albion	End of Season	
18 January 2023	CB	(England) Jasper Moon	(England) Barnsley	End of Season	
20 January 2023	FW	(Northern Ireland) Dale Taylor	(England) Nottingham Forest	End of Season	
31 January 2023	CF	(Morocco) Gassan Ahadme	(England) Ipswich Town	End of Season	
31 January 2023	LW	(England) Charlie Kirk	(England) Charlton Athletic	End of Season	
31 January 2023	CB	(Scotland) Samuel Lavelle	(England) Charlton Athletic	End of Season	

=== Loans out ===
Date	Pos	Player	Loaned to	On loan until	Ref
18 July 2022	LB	(England) Thierry Latty-Fairweather	(England) Hereford	End of Season	
29 July 2022	GK	(England) Callum Hawkins	(England) Leamington	End of Season	
3 August 2022	CF	(England) Tom Hewlett	(England) Belper Town	Short-term Loan	
3 August 2022	DM	(England) Ben Radcliffe	(England) Banbury United	Short-term Loan	
10 August 2022	CB	(England) Frazer Blake-Tracy	(England) Swindon Town	31 January 2023 (Note: On 31 January, Blake-Tracy signed for Swindon permanently)	
19 August 2022	MF	(England) Charlie Williams	(England) Banbury United	16 September 2022	
2 September 2022	CF	(England) Louis Moult	(Scotland) Motherwell	6 January 2023 (Note: On 6 January, Moult's loan at Motherwell was terminated)	
23 September 2022	GK	(England) Daniel Moore	(England) Belper Town	1 February 2023 (Note: On 1 February, Moore's contract at the club was terminated)	
27 September 2022	CF	(England) Tom Hewlett	(England) Leamington	27 October 2022	
27 January 2023	CM	(England) Charlie Lakin	(England) Doncaster Rovers	End of Season	

== Pre-season and friendlies ==
Burton announced a pre-season home match with Birmingham City on 19 May 2022. Northern Premier League Division One Midlands side Belper Town revealed a friendly with Burton on 24 May. A second home friendly match, against Sheffield United was added. Along with an away trip to Brackley Town. On June 7, the Brewers confirmed a pre-season fixture against Hibernian during a warm-weather training camp in Vilamoura, Portugal. Later, on June 24, the Brewers added further matches to the pre-season schedule - against Stratford Town, Burnley and Mickleover. A ninth match as part of pre-season was confirmed against Nottingham Forest. On July 25, the Brewers announced an XI side will travel to local side Staphenhill three days after the season opener.

Win Draw Loss Fixtures

1 July 2022 Friendly	Hibernian	4–2	Burton Albion	Alcantarilha, Portugal
11:00 WEST	Youan 10'; Melkersen 47', 53'; Kenneh 81'	Report	Ahadme 5'; Gilligan 77'	Stadium: Amendoeira Golf Resort

5 July 2022 Friendly	Stratford Town	1–2	Burton Albion	Tiddington
19:30 BST	Hawker 40'	Report	Keillor-Dunn 26'; Moult 82'	Stadium: Arden Garages Stadium

9 July 2022 Friendly	Burton Albion	Cancelled	Burnley	Burton upon Trent
15:30 BST				Stadium: Pirelli Stadium
Note: Match was cancelled due to reasons beyond Burnley's control.

12 July 2022 Friendly	Burton Albion	0–1	Nottingham Forest	Burton upon Trent
19:00 BST		Report	Cook 56'	Stadium: Pirelli Stadium; Attendance: 3,075; Referee: Ollie Yates

15 July 2022 Friendly	Mickleover	3–0	Burton Albion XI	Mickleover
19:30 BST	Davidson-Miller 27'; Warren 43'; Dales 66'	Report		Stadium: Don Amott Arena

16 July 2022 Friendly	Burton Albion	1–2	Birmingham City	Burton upon Trent
14:00 BST	Hamer 74'	Report	Hall 37'; Cosgrove 87'	Stadium: Pirelli Stadium; Attendance: 2,588

19 July 2022 Friendly	Brackley Town	2–1	Burton Albion	Brackley
19:30 BST	Murombedzi 23'; Stead 51'	Report	Moult 57'	Stadium: St James Park; Attendance: 263

22 July 2022 Friendly	Burton Albion	0–3	Sheffield United	Burton upon Trent
19:30 BST		Report	Jebbison 31', 40'; Stevens 63'	Stadium: Pirelli Stadium; Attendance: 1,524; Referee: James Beard

26 July 2022 Friendly	Belper Town	0–0	Burton Albion	Belper
19:30 BST		Report		Stadium: Christchurch Meadow

Mid-season

2 August 2022 Friendly	Stapenhill	0–6	Burton Albion XI	Stapenhill
19:45 BST		Report	Trialist 5', 36', 47'; Moult 27', 44'; Williams 89'	Stadium: Maple Grove

== Competitions ==
=== Overall record ===
Competition	First match	Last match	Starting round	Record							
Competition	First match	Last match	Starting round	Pld	W	D	L	GF	GA	GD	Win %
League One	August 2022	May 2023	Matchday 1	0	0	0	0	0	0	+0	—
FA Cup	TBC	TBC	Third round	0	0	0	0	0	0	+0	—
EFL Cup	TBC	TBC	First round	0	0	0	0	0	0	+0	—
EFL Trophy	TBC	TBC	Group stage	0	0	0	0	0	0	+0	—
Total				0	0	0	0	0	0	+0	—

Last updated: pre-season
Source: [ Soccerway]

=== League One ===
==== League table ====
Pos	Team	Pld	W	D	L	GF	GA	GD	Pts
12	Shrewsbury Town	46	17	8	21	52	61	−9	59
13	Fleetwood Town	46	14	16	16	53	51	+2	58
14	Exeter City	46	15	11	20	64	68	−4	56
15	Burton Albion	46	15	11	20	57	79	−22	56
16	Cheltenham Town	46	14	12	20	45	61	−16	54
17	Bristol Rovers	46	14	11	21	58	73	−15	53
18	Port Vale	46	13	10	23	48	71	−23	49

Source: EFL Official Website
Rules for classification: 1) Points; 2) Goal difference; 3) Number of goals scored; 4) Head-to-head results; 5) Wins; 6) Away goals; 7) Penalty points (sec 9.5); 8) 12-point sending off offences

==== Results summary ====
Overall								Home						Away					
Pld	W	D	L	GF	GA	GD	Pts	W	D	L	GF	GA	GD	W	D	L	GF	GA	GD
45	15	10	20	57	79	−22	55	9	6	7	28	33	−5	6	4	13	29	46	−17

Last updated: 3 May 2023.
Source: [ Soccerway]

==== Results by round ====
Round	1	2	3	4	5	6	7	8	9	10	11	12	13	14	15	16	17	18	19	20	21	22	23	24	25	26	27	28	29	30	31	32	33	34	35	36	37	38	39	40	41	42	43	44	45	46
Ground	A	H	A	H	H	A	A	H	A	A	H	H	A	H	H	A	A	H	H	A	H	A	H	A	A	H	H	A	H	A	A	H	A	H	H	A	A	H	A	H	H	A	A	A	H	H
Result	L	L	D	L	L	L	L	L	W	L	W	L	D	D	W	L	L	D	D	D	D	L	W	W	L	L	W	W	W	L	W	D	L	W	L	W	D	W	L	W	D	L	W	L	W	D
Position	24	24	22	24	24	24	24	24	24	24	23	23	23	23	21	23	24	23	22	23	22	23	23	20	21	23	23	20	18	19	18	18	19	18	18	18	18	18	18	16	17	18	16	17	14	15

Updated to match(es) played on 3 May 2023. Source: [ Soccerway]
A = Away; H = Home; W = Win; D = Draw; L = Loss; P = Postponed

==== Matches ====
Win Draw Loss Fixtures

On 23 June, the league fixtures were announced.

30 July 2022 1	Wycombe Wanderers	3–0	Burton Albion	High Wycombe
15:00 BST	Wheeler 7'; Mehmeti 16'; Scowen 30'	Report		Stadium: Adams Park; Attendance: 5,772; Referee: Gavin Ward

6 August 2022 2	Burton Albion	0–4	Bristol Rovers	Burton upon Trent
15:00 BST	Shaughnessy (red card) 1'; Smith (yellow card) 14'; Butcher (yellow card) 64'	Report	Evans 4'; Connolly 12'; Collins 40', 44'; Whelan (yellow card) 72'	Stadium: Pirelli Stadium; Attendance: 3,363; Referee: Ross Joyce

13 August 2022 3	Accrington Stanley	4–4	Burton Albion	Accrington
15:00 BST	Pritchard 52'; McConville 57'; Woods 90'; Longelo 90+6'	Report	Keillor-Dunn 10' (pen.), 17', 50'; Ahadme 81'	Stadium: Wham Stadium; Attendance: 1,997; Referee: Sam Barrott

16 August 2022 4	Burton Albion	0–1	Ipswich Town	Burton upon Trent
19:45 BST	Ahadme (yellow card) 90+1'	Report	Edmundson (yellow card) 45'; Harness 60'; Leigh (yellow card) 90+6'	Stadium: Pirelli Stadium; Attendance: 3,562; Referee: Ben Toner

20 August 2022 5	Burton Albion	0–2	Port Vale	Burton upon Trent
15:00 BST		Report	Garrity 49'; Harrison 90+1'	Stadium: Pirelli Stadium; Attendance: 3,744; Referee: Andy Haines

27 August 2022 6	Cambridge United	4–3	Burton Albion	Cambridge
15:00 BST	Smith 34', 53', 69'; Digby (yellow card) 38'; O'Neil 79'; Lankester (yellow card) 90+6'	Report	Ahadme 1', (yellow card) 27', (goal) 67'; Smith (red card) 10'; Hamer (yellow card) 19'; Brayford 41', (yellow card) 51'; Borthwick-Jackson (yellow card) 90+7'	Stadium: The Abbey Stadium; Attendance: 5,130; Referee: Ben Speedie

3 September 2022 7	Oxford United	2–1	Burton Albion	Littlemore
15:00 BST	Brannagan 48'; Joseph 71'; Findlay (yellow card) 86'	Report	Hughes (yellow card) 58'; Brayford (yellow card) 60'; Adeboyejo 77'	Stadium: The Kassam Stadium; Attendance: 7,560; Referee: Bobby Madden

10 September 2022	Burton Albion	Postponed	Fleetwood Town	Burton upon Trent
15:00 BST				Stadium: Pirelli Stadium
Note: Fixture was postponed as a mark of respect following the passing of Queen Elizabeth II.

13 September 2022 8	Burton Albion	0–2	Portsmouth	Burton upon Trent
19:45 BST	Gilligan (yellow card) 28'; Taylor (yellow card) 57'	Report	Raggett (yellow card) 53'; Hughes 59' (o.g.); Bishop 86'	Stadium: Pirelli Stadium; Attendance: 2,945; Referee: Robert Lewis

17 September 2022 9	Exeter City	0–2	Burton Albion	Exeter
15:00 BST	Harper (yellow card) 68'; Key (yellow card) 90+2'	Report	Borthwick-Jackson (yellow card) 18'; Hughes (yellow card) 33'; Oshilaja 63', (yellow card) 84'; Keillor-Dunn 69'; Butcher (yellow card) 87'	Stadium: St James Park; Attendance: 6,185; Referee: Neil Hair

24 September 2022 10	Shrewsbury Town	2–1	Burton Albion	Shrewsbury
15:00 BST	Saydee 13'; Bowman 66'; Dunkley (yellow card) 90+11'	Report	Adeboyejo 57'; Borthwick-Jackson (yellow card) 71'	Stadium: Montgomery Waters Meadow; Attendance: 5,667; Referee: Thomas Kirk

1 October 2022 11	Burton Albion	3–2	Forest Green Rovers	Burton upon Trent
15:00 BST	Adeboyejo 6' 82' 90+2'; Hamer (red card) 68'; Oshilaja (yellow card) 90+6'	Report	Brown 52'; Wickham 69' (pen.)	Stadium: Pirelli Stadium; Attendance: 2,620; Referee: Sunny Gill

4 October 2022 12	Burton Albion	0–1	Fleetwood Town	Burton upon Trent
19:45 BST	Oshilaja (yellow card) 19'	Report	Warrington (yellow card) 21'; Macadam 34'; Vela (yellow card) 61'	Stadium: Pirelli Stadium; Attendance: 1,961; Referee: Charles Breakspear

8 October 2022 13	Peterborough United	1–1	Burton Albion	Peterborough
15:00 BST	Clarke-Harris 47'	Report	Brayford (yellow card) 60'; Adeboyejo 75'	Stadium: Weston Homes Stadium; Attendance: 8,032; Referee: Seb Stockbridge

15 October 2022 14	Burton Albion	1–1	Morecambe	Burton upon Trent
15:00 BST	Keillor-Dunn 30'	Report	Connolly (yellow card) 23'; Shaw (yellow card) 25'; Delaney 77' (yellow card) 78'; Fané (yellow card) 79'; Rawson (yellow card) 90+1'	Stadium: Pirelli Stadium; Attendance: 2,602; Referee: Tom Reeves

22 October 2022 15	Burton Albion	1–0	Cheltenham Town	Burton upon Trent
15:00 BST	Keillor-Dunn (penalty missed) 45'; Adeboyejo 77'; Taylor (yellow card) 90+5'	Report	Perry (yellow card) 68'; Jackson (yellow card) 90+5'	Stadium: Pirelli Stadium; Attendance: 2,269; Referee: Peter Wright

25 October 2022 16	Bolton Wanderers	2–1	Burton Albion	Horwich
19:45 BST	Afolayan (yellow card) 49'; Bakayoko 87'; Böðvarsson 90+8' (yellow card) 90+8'	Report	Adeboyejo (yellow card) 52'; Hughes 73'	Stadium: University of Bolton Stadium; Attendance: 16,172; Referee: Sam Allison

29 October 2022 17	Sheffield Wednesday	4–2	Burton Albion	Owlerton
15:00 BST	Bannan 22'; Smith 26'; Wilks 53'; Dele-Bashiru 75'; Gregory (penalty missed) 80'	Report	Winnall 76'; Hamer 82'	Stadium: Hillsborough; Attendance: 23,692; Referee: David Rock

12 November 2022 18	Burton Albion	3–3	Charlton Athletic	Burton upon Trent
15:00 GMT	Oshilaja 38'; Hamer 45'; Adeboyejo 58'; Taylor (yellow card) 70'	Report	Kirk 26', 36'; Rak-Sakyi 75'	Stadium: Pirelli Stadium; Attendance: 3,084; Referee: Will Finnie

19 November 2022 19	Burton Albion	2–2	Plymouth Argyle	Burton upon Trent
15:00 GMT	Oshilaja (yellow card) 17'; Kamwa 41'; Onyango (yellow card) 62'; Hamer (yellow card) 63'; Winnall (yellow card) 85'; Mariappa 90+7'	Report	Lonwijk (yellow card) 25'; Hardie 64' (pen.); Mumba 73'	Stadium: Pirelli Stadium; Attendance: 3,986; Referee: Martin Woods

3 December 2022 20	Milton Keynes Dons	1–1	Burton Albion	Denbigh
15:00 GMT	Harvie (yellow card) 45+5'; Johnson 84'	Report	Adeboyejo 29' (pen.); Onyango (yellow card) 64'; Garratt (yellow card) 90+1'	Stadium: Stadium:mk; Attendance: 6,073; Referee: Lee Swabey

10 December 2022 21	Burton Albion	1–1	Derby County	Burton upon Trent
14:00 GMT	Adeboyejo 79'	Report	Collins 23'; Roberts (yellow card) 46'; Cashin (yellow card) 71'	Stadium: Pirelli Stadium; Attendance: 5,922; Referee: Geoff Eltringham

17 December 2022 22	Barnsley	2–0	Burton Albion	Barnsley
15:00 GMT	Cole 36', 73'; Connell (yellow card) 48'	Report	Taylor (yellow card) 90+1'	Stadium: Oakwell; Attendance: 9,423; Referee: Alan Young

26 December 2022 23	Burton Albion	3–0	Lincoln City	Burton upon Trent
15:00 GMT	Hughes 5'; Smith 14'; Adeboyejo 27' (pen.)	Report	Diamond (yellow card) 75'	Stadium: Pirelli Stadium; Attendance: 3,687; Referee: Ben Toner

29 December 2022 24	Forest Green Rovers	1–2	Burton Albion	Nailsworth
19:45 GMT	Matt (penalty missed) 67'; Peart-Harris 90+3'; Hendry (yellow card) 90+7'	Report	Brayford 45+2'; Garratt (yellow card) 82'; Oshilaja (yellow card) 86'; Taylor (yellow card) 88'; Kamwa 89'	Stadium: The Bolt New Lawn; Attendance: 2,584; Referee: Thomas Kirk

1 January 2023 25	Morecambe	5–0	Burton Albion	Morecambe
15:00 GMT	Phillips 32', 55'; Weir 45+1'; Watts 51', (yellow card) 66', (goal) 83'	Report	Taylor (yellow card) 75'	Stadium: The Mazuma Stadium; Attendance: 3,972; Referee: Anthony Backhouse

14 January 2023 26	Burton Albion	0–4	Shrewsbury Town	Burton upon Trent
15:00 GMT		Report	Saydee 1', 43'; Shipley (yellow card) 12'; Leahy 58' (pen.); Flanagan (yellow card) 70'; Pyke (yellow card) 86'; Dunkley 90+4'	Stadium: Pirelli Stadium; Attendance: 3,575; Referee: Seb Stockbridge

21 January 2023	Lincoln City	Postponed	Burton Albion	Lincoln
15:00 GMT				Stadium: LNER Stadium
Note: Fixture was postponed due to a frozen pitch.

24 January 2023	Burton Albion	Postponed	Peterborough United	Burton upon Trent
19:45 GMT				Stadium: Pirelli Stadium
Note: Fixture was postponed due to a frozen pitch.

28 January 2023 27	Burton Albion	2–0	Oxford United	Burton upon Trent
15:00 GMT	Eastwood 40' (o.g.); Taylor 49'	Report	Goodrham (yellow card) 79'	Stadium: Pirelli Stadium; Attendance: 2,993; Referee: Adam Herczeg

4 February 2023 28	Fleetwood Town	2–3	Burton Albion	Fleetwood
15:00 GMT	Stockley 58'; Vela (red card) 86'; Omochere 90+4'	Report	Oshilaja 60'; Hamer 80'; Ashworth (yellow card) 90+3'; Kirk 90+6'	Stadium: Highbury Stadium; Attendance: 3,022; Referee: Martin Coy

11 February 2023 29	Burton Albion	1–0	Exeter City	Burton upon Trent
15:00 GMT	Winnall 84'; Kirk (yellow card) 86'	Report	Stansfield (yellow card) 40'	Stadium: Pirelli Stadium; Attendance: 3,105; Referee: Carl Brook

14 February 2023 30	Portsmouth	1–0	Burton Albion	Milton
19:45 GMT	Scarlett 90+2'	Report	Ashworth (yellow card) 36'; Moon (yellow card) 45+1'; Oshilaja (yellow card) 45+2'; Hughes (yellow card) 70'	Stadium: Fratton Park; Attendance: 16,434 (103 away fans); Referee: Tim Robinson

18 February 2023 31	Bristol Rovers	1–2	Burton Albion	Horfield
15:00 GMT	Marquis 9'	Report	McCann (yellow card) 11'; Moon (yellow card) 36'; Kirk 44'; Winnall 55'; Powell (yellow card) 63'	Stadium: Memorial Stadium; Attendance: 8,164 (257 away); Referee: Benjamin Speedie

25 February 2023 32	Burton Albion	0–0	Accrington Stanley	Burton upon Trent
15:00 GMT	Lavelle (yellow card) 76'	Report	Whalley (yellow card) 87'; McConville (yellow card) 90+5'	Stadium: Pirelli Stadium; Attendance: 2,578; Referee: Josh Smith

5 March 2023 33	Ipswich Town	4–0	Burton Albion	Ipswich
15:00 GMT	Clarke (yellow card) 15'; Chaplin 31', 69'; Broadhead 38'; Ladapo 42'	Report	Moon (yellow card) 18'; Brayford (yellow card) 19'; Hamer (yellow card) 42'; Shaughnessy (yellow card) 65'	Stadium: Portman Road; Attendance: 25,003 (147 away); Referee: Carl Boyeson

11 March 2023 34	Burton Albion	2–1	Wycombe Wanderers	Burton upon Trent
15:00 GMT	Taylor 10'; Powell 18'; Moon (yellow card) 30'; Oshilaja (red card) 45+1'	Report	Jacobson (penalty missed) 79'; De Barr 85'; Grimmer (yellow card) 90+2'; Scowen (yellow card) 90+3'	Stadium: Pirelli Stadium; Attendance: 2,965; Referee: Lee Swabey

14 March 2023 35	Burton Albion	2–5	Peterborough United	Burton upon Trent
19:45 GMT	Powell 28'; Smith 55'; Hughes (yellow card) 67'	Report	Clarke-Harris 12', 51'; Mason-Clark 19'; Burrows 38'; Ward 64'	Stadium: Pirelli Stadium; Attendance: 2,383; Referee: Craig Hicks

18 March 2023 36	Port Vale	2–3	Burton Albion	Burslem
15:00 GMT	Harrison 2'; Politic (yellow card) 65'; Agyakwa (yellow card) 75'; Proctor 80'	Report	Taylor 8', 67'; Ashworth (yellow card) 21'; Kirk (yellow card) 43'; Smith 48' (pen.); Shaughnessy (yellow card) 54'	Stadium: Vale Park; Attendance: 6,897 (609 away); Referee: Sam Allison

25 March 2023	Burton Albion	Postponed	Cambridge United	Burton upon Trent
15:00 GMT				Stadium: Pirelli Stadium
Note: Fixture was postponed due to international call-ups.

1 April 2023 37	Cheltenham Town	0–0	Burton Albion	Cheltenham
15:00 BST	Ferry (yellow card) 2'; Rea (yellow card) 69'; Bradbury (yellow card) 80'	Report		Stadium: The Completely Suzuki Stadium; Attendance: 3,864 (322 away); Referee: Ollie Yates

7 April 2023 38	Burton Albion	2–1	Barnsley	Burton upon Trent
15:00 BST	Kirk (yellow card) 15'; Powell (yellow card) 48'; Shaughnessy 50', (yellow card) 89'; Ashworth (yellow card) 65'; Brayford (yellow card) 69'; MacGillivray (yellow card) 81'; Taylor 87'	Report	Watters (yellow card) 81'; Cadden 89'; Andersen (yellow card) 90'	Stadium: Pirelli Stadium; Attendance: 4,333; Referee: Adam Herczeg

10 April 2023 39	Charlton Athletic	3–2	Burton Albion	Charlton
15:00 BST	Rak-Sakyi 7', 17'; Bonne 50'; Payne (yellow card) 87' (yellow-red card) 90+1'; Maynard-Brewer (yellow card) 90+7'	Report	Hughes 45+2'; Moon (yellow card) 74'; Walker 76'	Stadium: The Valley; Attendance: 12,788 (222 away); Referee: Sunny Gill

15 April 2023 40	Burton Albion	3–2	Sheffield Wednesday	Burton upon Trent
15:00 BST	Brayford 21'; Hughes (yellow card) 24'; Helm 34', 37'	Report	Paterson 28'; Smith 85' (pen.); Palmer (yellow card) 90+5'	Stadium: Pirelli Stadium; Attendance: 4,682; Referee: Will Finnie

18 April 2023 41	Burton Albion	1–1	Bolton Wanderers	Burton upon Trent
19:45 BST	Powell (yellow card) 55'; Walker 59'	Report	Adeboyejo 5'; Williams (yellow card) 90+5'	Stadium: Pirelli Stadium; Attendance: 3,328; Referee: Andrew Kitchen

22 April 2023 42	Derby County	1–0	Burton Albion	Derby
15:00 BST	McGoldrick 63' (pen.); Roberts (yellow card) 77'	Report	Oshilaja (yellow card) 49'	Stadium: Pride Park Stadium; Attendance: 29,304 (2,101 away); Referee: Ben Toner

25 April 2023 43	Lincoln City	0–1	Burton Albion	Lincoln
19:45 BST		Report	Ahadme 79'	Stadium: LNER Stadium; Attendance: 7,645 (243 away); Referee: Paul Howard

29 April 2023 44	Plymouth Arglye	1–0	Burton Albion	Plymouth
15:00 BST	Ennis 45'	Report	Ashworth (yellow card) 66'; Powell (yellow card) 89'; Carayol (yellow card) 90+3'	Stadium: Home Park; Attendance: 16,634 (283 away); Referee: Lewis Smith

3 May 2023 45	Burton Albion	1–0	Cambridge United	Burton upon Trent
19:45 BST	Latty-Fairweather (yellow card) 13'; Helm 28'; Kirk (yellow card) 77'	Report	Morrison (yellow card) 90+2'	Stadium: Pirelli Stadium; Attendance: 3,523; Referee: Andy Haines

7 May 2023 46	Burton Albion	0–0	Milton Keynes Dons	Burton upon Trent
12:00 BST	Oshilaja (yellow card) 53'	Report	McEachran (yellow card) 32'	Stadium: Pirelli Stadium; Attendance: 5,021 (1,698 away); Referee: Seb Stockbridge

=== FA Cup ===
The Brewers were drawn at home to Needham Market in the first round, and to Chippenham Town in the second round and away to Grimsby Town in the third round.

Win Draw Loss Fixtures

5 November 2022 First round	Burton Albion	2–0	Needham Market	Burton upon Trent
15:00 GMT	Oshilaja 34'; Powell 90+4'	Report		Stadium: Pirelli Stadium; Attendance: 1,989; Referee: Andrew Kitchen

27 November 2022 Second round	Burton Albion	6–1	Chippenham Town	Burton upon Trent
14:00 GMT	Smith 28'; Oshilaja 44', 90'; Kamwa 54'; Winnall 78', 84'	Report	Minturn (yellow card) 36'; Parsons 60'	Stadium: Pirelli Stadium; Attendance: 2,080; Referee: Ben Speedie

7 January 2023 Third round	Grimsby Town	1–0	Burton Albion	Cleethorpes
17:30 GMT	Richardson 76', (yellow card) 90+4'; Morris (yellow card) 90+2'	Report	Kamwa (yellow card) 68'; Amissah (yellow card) 85'	Stadium: Blundell Park; Attendance: 5,447; Referee: Charles Breakspear

=== EFL Cup ===
Win Draw Loss Fixtures

Burton Albion were drawn away to Rochdale in the first round.

9 August 2022 First round	Rochdale	2–0	Burton Albion	Spotland
19:45 BST	Diagouraga (yellow card) 40'; Ball 86' (pen.); Rodney 90+4'	Report	Powell (yellow card) 30'; Onyango (yellow card) 84'	Stadium: Spotland; Attendance: 1,601; Referee: Scott Oldham

=== EFL Trophy ===
On 20 June, the initial Group stage draw was made, grouping Burton Albion with Bradford City and Sheffield Wednesday. Three days later, Leicester City U21s joined Northern Group H. The Brewers were then drawn at home to Tranmere Rovers in the second round and to Accrington Stanley in the third round.

Pos	Div	Team	Pld	W	PW	PL	L	GF	GA	GD	Pts	Qualification
1	L1	Burton Albion	3	3	0	0	0	11	4	+7	9	Advance to Round 2
2	L2	Bradford City	3	1	0	1	1	5	7	−2	4	Advance to Round 2
3	L1	Sheffield Wednesday	3	1	0	0	2	5	6	−1	3	
4	ACA	Leicester City U21	3	0	1	0	2	4	8	−4	2	

Source: EFL.com

Win Draw Loss Fixtures

30 August 2022 Group stage	Burton Albion	4–2	Leicester City U21	Burton upon Trent
19:00 BST	Ahadme 4', 7'; Adeboyejo 9'; Powell 12'; Castro (yellow card) 73' (yellow-red card) 90+4'	Report	Maswanhise 38'; Fitzhugh 39'; Hughes (yellow card) 69'; Wormleighton (yellow card) 90+1'	Stadium: Pirelli Stadium; Attendance: 475; Referee: Adam Herczeg

20 September 2022 Group Game 2	Sheffield Wednesday	2–3	Burton Albion	Owlerton
19:00 BST	Bakinson (yellow card) 24'; Wilks 32'; Paterson 34'	Report	Winnall 8'; Smith 17'; Hamer (yellow card) 30'; Keillor-Dunn 51' (pen.); Butcher (yellow card) 64'; Adeboyejo (yellow card) 90+3'	Stadium: Hillsborough; Attendance: 4,577; Referee: Thomas Parsons

18 October 2022 Group stage	Burton Albion	4–0	Bradford City	Burton upon Trent
19:00 BST	Powell 10'; Adeboyejo 20'; Oshilaja 57'; Carayol 69'	Report		Stadium: Pirelli Stadium; Attendance: 549; Referee: Ollie Yates

22 November 2022 Second round	Burton Albion	1–1 (5–4 p)	Tranmere Rovers	Burton upon Trent
19:00 GMT	Taylor (yellow card) 70'; Carayol 90+2'		Turnbull 7', (yellow card) 33'; Merrie (yellow card) 84'; Hemmings (yellow card) 90+1'	Stadium: Pirelli Stadium; Attendance: 591; Referee: Thomas Parsons
	Penalties
	Winnall (penalty scored); Taylor (penalty missed); Oshilaja (penalty scored); Dodoo (penalty scored); Butcher (penalty scored); Hamer (penalty missed); Kamwa (penalty scored)		Hemmings (penalty scored); Hughes (penalty scored); Merrie (penalty scored); Lewis (penalty missed); Hawkes (penalty scored); O'Connor (penalty missed); Dacres-Cogley (penalty missed)

13 December 2022 Third round	Burton Albion	2–4	Accrington Stanley	Burton upon Trent
19:00 GMT	Oshilaja 7'; Borthwick-Jackson (yellow card) 20'; Tharme 23' (o.g.); Hughes (yellow card) 61'	Report	Rodgers 20', 68'; Pritchard 41'; Leigh 45+5'	Stadium: Pirelli Stadium; Attendance: 390; Referee: Scott Oldham
