= 2021–22 Burton Albion F.C. season =

Burton Albion
2021–22 season
- Chairman: Ben Robinson
- Manager: Jimmy Floyd Hasselbaink
- Stadium: Pirelli Stadium
- League One: 16th
- FA Cup: Second round
- EFL Cup: First round
- EFL Trophy: Group stage
- Top goalscorer: League: Daniel Jebbison (7); All: Daniel Jebbison (8)
Home colours	Away colours

The 2021–22 season is Burton Albion's 72nd year in their history and fourth consecutive season in League One. Along with the league, the club will also compete in the FA Cup, the EFL Cup and the EFL Trophy. The season covers the period from 1 July 2021 to 30 June 2022.

== First-team squad ==
As of 25 July 2021

Note: Flags indicate national team as has been defined under FIFA eligibility rules. Players may hold more than one non-FIFA nationality.

No.	Name	Nat.	Position(s)	Date of birth (age)	Apps.	Goals	Year signed	Signed from	Transfer fee
Goalkeepers
20	Callum Hawkins	(England)	GK	12 December 1999 (age 26)	0	0	2018	Academy	Trainee
24	Ben Garratt	(England)	GK	25 April 1994 (age 32)	53	0	2019	(England) Crewe Alexandra	Free
28	Daniel Moore	(England)	GK		0	0	2021	Academy	Trainee
Defenders
2	John Brayford	(England)	RB/CB	29 December 1987 (age 38)	292	19	2017	(England) Sheffield United	Free
3	Cameron Borthwick-Jackson	(England)	LB/CB	2 February 1997 (age 29)	26	0	2021	(England) Oldham Athletic	Free
4	Deji Oshilaja	(England)	CB	16 July 1993 (age 33)	21	0	2021	(England) Charlton Athletic	Free
12	Sam Hughes	(England)	CB/RB/DM	15 April 1997 (age 29)	18	3	2021	(England) Leicester City	Loan
18	Frazer Blake-Tracy	(England)	LB/CB	10 September 1995 (age 31)	9	0	2021	(England) Peterborough United	Free
22	Williams Kokolo	(France)	LB/LM	9 June 2000 (age 26)	3	0	2022	(England) Middlesbrough	£45,000
26	Ryan Leak	(England)	CB	28 February 1998 (age 28)	15	0	2021	(Spain) Burgos	Free
34	Luke Redfern	(England)			0	0	2021	Academy	Trainee
35	Ben McClean	(England)			0	0	2021	Academy	Trainee
37	Tom Hamer	(England)	RB/CB/DM	16 November 1999 (age 26)	50	4	2021	(England) Oldham Athletic	Undisclosed
38	Michael Mancienne	(England)	CB	8 January 1988 (age 38)	30	0	2021	(United States) New England Revolution	Free
Midfielders
7	Bryn Morris	(England)	DM/CM	25 April 1996 (age 30)	14	0	2021	(England) Portsmouth	Free
8	Joe Powell	(England)	AM/LM/RM	30 October 1998 (age 28)	75	15	2020	(England) West Ham United	Undisclosed
11	Jonny Smith	(England)	LM/RM	28 July 1997 (age 29)	38	6	2021	(England) Bristol City	Undisclosed
15	Thomas O'Connor	(Republic of Ireland)	DM/LB/LM	21 April 1999 (age 27)	20	5	2021	(England) Southampton	Free
16	Conor Shaughnessy	(Republic of Ireland)	DM/CB	30 June 1996 (age 30)	30	3	2021	(England) Rochdale	Free
17	Danny Rowe	(England)	LW	9 March 1992 (age 34)	20	0	2021	Free Agent	Free
23	Terry Taylor	(Wales) (Scotland)	DM/CB	29 June 2001 (age 25)	32	0	2021	(England) Wolverhampton Wanderers	Undisclosed
25	Ciaran Gilligan	(Republic of Ireland)	RM/CM	5 February 2002 (age 24)	26	0	2020	Academy	Trainee
29	Jacob Maddox	(England)	AM/RM/LM	3 November 1998 (age 28)	9	0	2021	(Portugal) Vitória de Guimarães	Loan
40	Charlie Lakin	(England)	CM/RM/LM	8 May 1999 (age 27)	20	2	2021	(England) Birmingham City	Free
Forwards
9	Gassan Ahadme	(Morocco) (Spain)	CF/SS	17 November 2000 (age 25)	4	0	2022	(England) Norwich City	Undisclosed
21	Daniel Jebbison	(England) (Canada)	CF	13 August 2003 (age 23)	19	8	2021	(England) Sheffield United	Loan
27	Tom Hewlett	(England)	CF		2	0	2020	Academy	Trainee
31	Louis Moult	(England)	CF	14 May 1992 (age 34)	2	0	2021	(England) Preston North End	Free
Out on Loan
1	Kieran O'Hara	(Republic of Ireland) (England)	GK	22 April 1996 (age 30)	60	0	2020	(England) Manchester United	Free
5	Michael Bostwick	(England)	CB/RB/DM	17 May 1988 (age 38)	39	2	2020	(England) Lincoln City	Free
19	Aaron Amadi-Holloway	(Wales)	CF/LW/RW	1 February 1993 (age 33)	11	3	2021	(India) East Bengal	Free
36	Thierry Latty-Fairweather	(England)			1	0	2020	Academy	Trainee

=== Statistics ===
As of 20 January 2022

No.	Pos	Nat	Player	Total		League One		FA Cup		League Cup		League Trophy	
No.	Pos	Nat	Player	Apps	Goals	Apps	Goals	Apps	Goals	Apps	Goals	Apps	Goals
2	DF	(England) ENG	John Brayford	17	3	16+0	3	0+0	0	1+0	0	0+0	0
3	DF	(England) ENG	Cameron Borthwick-Jackson	27	0	19+3	0	2+0	0	0+0	0	2+1	0
4	DF	(England) ENG	Deji Oshilaja	21	0	18+0	0	2+0	0	1+0	0	0+0	0
7	MF	(England) ENG	Bryn Morris	10	0	1+6	0	0+0	0	0+0	0	3+0	0
8	MF	(England) ENG	Joe Powell	22	3	13+5	2	1+0	1	1+0	0	1+1	0
9	FW	(Morocco) MAR	Gassan Ahadme	4	0	4+0	0	0+0	0	0+0	0	0+0	0
11	MF	(England) ENG	Jonny Smith	23	5	16+4	4	1+0	0	1+0	0	0+1	1
12	DF	(England) ENG	Sam Hughes*	4	1	4+0	1	0+0	0	0+0	0	0+0	0
15	MF	(Republic of Ireland) IRL	Thomas O'Connor	21	5	17+1	5	1+0	0	1+0	0	0+1	0
16	MF	(Republic of Ireland) IRL	Conor Shaughnessy	31	3	25+1	3	2+0	0	1+0	0	2+0	0
17	FW	(England) ENG	Danny Rowe	5	0	0+2	0	0+0	0	0+1	0	2+0	0
18	DF	(England) ENG	Frazer Blake-Tracy	9	0	3+2	0	0+0	0	0+1	0	3+0	0
21	FW	(Canada) CAN	Daniel Jebbison*	23	9	14+6	7	2+0	1	0+0	0	1+0	1
22	DF	(France) FRA	Williams Kokolo	3	0	1+2	0	0+0	0	0+0	0	0+0	0
23	MF	(Wales) WAL	Terry Taylor	16	0	10+2	0	2+0	0	0+1	0	0+1	0
24	GK	(England) ENG	Ben Garratt	31	0	28+0	0	2+0	0	1+0	0	0+0	0
25	MF	(Republic of Ireland) IRL	Ciaran Gilligan	4	0	2+0	0	0+0	0	0+0	0	0+2	0
26	DF	(Wales) WAL	Ryan Leak	20	1	13+1	0	2+0	1	1+0	0	3+0	0
29	MF	(England) ENG	Jacob Maddox*	12	0	5+5	0	0+0	0	0+0	0	2+0	0
31	FW	(England) ENG	Louis Moult	2	0	0+2	0	0+0	0	0+0	0	0+0	0
33	MF	(England) ENG	Charlie Williams	1	0	0+0	0	0+0	0	0+0	0	1+0	0
37	DF	(England) ENG	Ben Hamer	32	1	27+0	1	2+0	0	1+0	0	2+0	0
38	DF	(England) ENG	Michael Mancienne	13	0	8+3	0	1+1	0	0+0	0	0+0	0
39	FW	(England) ENG	Harry Chapman	15	1	9+4	1	0+1	0	0+0	0	1+0	0
40	MF	(England) ENG	Charlie Lakin	21	2	9+11	1	0+0	0	0+0	0	1+0	1
Players who are out on loan:
5	DF	(England) ENG	Michael Bostwick	10	0	8+2	0	0+0	0	0+0	0	0+0	0
19	FW	(Wales) WAL	Aaron Amadi-Holloway	11	3	2+4	0	0+2	0	0+0	0	2+1	3
Players who have left the club:
9	FW	(England) ENG	Kane Hemmings	21	5	10+8	4	2+0	0	0+0	0	1+0	1
10	FW	(Grenada) GRN	Lukas Akins	23	3	21+1	3	0+0	0	1+0	0	0+0	0
14	FW	(England) ENG	Omari Patrick	12	0	5+2	0	0+1	0	1+0	0	3+0	0
22	GK	(England) ENG	Ellery Balcombe*	3	0	0+0	0	0+0	0	0+0	0	3+0	0

=== Goals record ===
As of 30 January 2022

Rank	No.	Nat.	Po.	Name	League One	FA Cup	League Cup	League Trophy	Total
1	21	(England)	CF	Daniel Jebbison	7	1	0	1	9
2	~~9~~	(England)	CF	Kane Hemmings	4	0	0	1	5
2	11	(England)	RW	Jonny Smith	4	0	0	1	5
2	15	(Republic of Ireland)	DM	Thomas O'Connor	5	0	0	0	5
5	2	(England)	RB	John Brayford	3	0	0	0	3
5	8	(England)	AM	Joe Powell	2	1	0	0	3
5	~~10~~	(Grenada)	LW	Lukas Akins	3	0	0	0	3
5	16	(Republic of Ireland)	CB	Conor Shaughnessy	3	0	0	0	3
5	19	(Wales)	CF	Aaron Amadi-Holloway	0	0	0	3	3
10	40	(England)	CM	Charlie Lakin	1	0	0	1	2
11	12	(England)	CB	Sam Hughes	1	0	0	0	1
11	37	(England)	RB	Ben Hamer	1	0	0	0	1
11	~~39~~	(England)	RW	Harry Chapman	1	0	0	0	1
Own Goals					0	0	1	1	2
Total					35	1	1	8	45

=== Disciplinary record ===
As of 30 January 2022

Rank	No.	Nat.	Po.	Name	League One			FA Cup			League Cup			League Trophy			Total		
Rank	No.	Nat.	Po.	Name	Yellow card	(yellow card) (yellow-red card)	Red card	Yellow card	(yellow card) (yellow-red card)	Red card	Yellow card	(yellow card) (yellow-red card)	Red card	Yellow card	(yellow card) (yellow-red card)	Red card	Yellow card	(yellow card) (yellow-red card)	Red card
1	37	(England)	RB	Ben Hamer	8	0	0	0	0	0	0	0	0	0	0	0	8	0	0
2	4	(England)	CB	Deji Oshilaja	5	0	1	0	0	0	0	0	0	0	0	0	5	0	1
2	~~9~~	(England)	CF	Kane Hemmings	5	0	0	0	0	0	0	0	0	1	0	0	6	0	0
2	38	(England)	CB	Michael Mancienne	6	0	0	0	0	0	0	0	0	0	0	0	6	0	0
5	2	(England)	RB	John Brayford	2	1	0	0	0	0	0	0	0	0	0	0	2	1	0
5	40	(England)	CM	Charlie Lakin	2	1	0	0	0	0	0	0	0	0	0	0	2	1	0
7	3	(England)	LB	Cameron Borthwick-Jackson	3	0	0	0	0	0	0	0	0	0	0	0	3	0	0
7	8	(England)	AM	Joe Powell	2	0	0	0	0	0	0	0	0	1	0	0	3	0	0
7	5	(England)	CB	Michael Bostwick	2	0	0	0	0	0	0	0	0	0	0	0	2	0	0
7	~~10~~	(Grenada)	LW	Lukas Akins	2	0	0	0	0	0	0	0	0	0	0	0	2	0	0
7	11	(England)	RW	Jonny Smith	1	0	1	0	0	0	0	0	0	0	0	0	1	0	1
7	18	(England)	LB	Frazer Blake-Tracy	1	0	0	0	0	0	0	0	0	1	0	0	2	0	0
7	21	(Canada)	CF	Daniel Jebbison	2	0	0	0	0	0	0	0	0	0	0	0	2	0	0
7	23	(Wales)	DM	Terry Taylor	2	0	0	0	0	0	0	0	0	0	0	0	2	0	0
15	12	(England)	CB	Sam Hughes	1	0	0	0	0	0	0	0	0	0	0	0	1	0	0
15	15	(Republic of Ireland)	DM	Thomas O'Connor	1	0	0	0	0	0	0	0	0	0	0	0	1	0	0
15	16	(Republic of Ireland)	DM	Conor Shaughnessy	0	0	0	1	0	0	0	0	0	0	0	0	1	0	0
15	19	(Wales)	CF	Aaron Amadi-Holloway	0	0	0	0	0	0	0	0	0	1	0	0	1	0	0
15	22	(France)	LB	Williams Kokolo	1	0	0	0	0	0	0	0	0	0	0	0	1	0	0
15	26	(Wales)	CB	Ryan Leak	1	0	0	0	0	0	0	0	0	0	0	0	1	0	0
15	29	(England)	AM	Jacob Maddox	1	0	0	0	0	0	0	0	0	0	0	0	1	0	0
15	31	(England)	CF	Louis Moult	1	0	0	0	0	0	0	0	0	0	0	0	1	0	0
15	39	(England)	RW	Harry Chapman	1	0	0	0	0	0	0	0	0	0	0	0	1	0	0
Total					49	2	1	1	0	0	0	0	0	4	0	0	53	2	1

== Pre-season friendlies ==
Burton Albion confirmed they would play friendlies against Nuneaton Borough, Bognor Regis Town, Scunthorpe United, Grantham Town, Leicester City, Alfreton Town, Newcastle United and Belper Town as part of their pre-season preparations.

6 July 2021 Friendly	Nuneaton Borough	1–3	Burton Albion	Nuneaton
19:45 BST	Baker 85' (pen.)	Report	Patrick 57'; Hemmings 70'; Powell 74'	Stadium: Liberty Way

10 July 2021 Friendly	Bognor Regis Town	0–3	Burton Albion	Bognor Regis
13:00 BST		Report	Trialist 26'; Taylor 47'; Moult 82'	Stadium: Nyewood Lane

20 July 2021 Friendly	Scunthorpe United	2–1	Burton Albion	Scunthorpe
19:30 BST	Taft 15'; Trialist 60'	Report	Smith 20'	Stadium: Sands Venue Stadium

21 July 2021 Friendly	Grantham Town	Cancelled	Burton Albion XI	Grantham
19:45 BST				Stadium: South Kesteven Sports Stadium
Note: Match was cancelled due to positive COVID-19 cases within the squad.

24 July 2021 Bass Charity Vase	Burton Albion	0–0 (3–1 p)	Leicester City	Burton upon Trent
15:00 BST		Report		Stadium: Pirelli Stadium

27 July 2021 Friendly	Alfreton Town	2–1	Burton Albion	Alfreton
19:45 BST	Rhead 14', 38' (pen.)	Report	Powell 62' (pen.)	Stadium: Impact Arena; Attendance: 247

30 July 2021 Friendly	Burton Albion	0–2	Newcastle United	Burton upon Trent
19:45 BST		Report	Murphy 6'; Joelinton 46'	Stadium: Pirelli Stadium; Attendance: 3,598; Referee: James Oldham

3 August 2021 Friendly	Belper Town	v	Burton Albion XI	Belper
19:00 BST				Stadium: Christchurch Meadow

== Competitions ==
=== League One ===
==== League table ====
Pos	Team	Pld	W	D	L	GF	GA	GD	Pts
12	Accrington Stanley	46	17	10	19	61	80	−19	61
13	Charlton Athletic	46	17	8	21	55	59	−4	59
14	Cambridge United	46	15	13	18	56	74	−18	58
15	Cheltenham Town	46	13	17	16	66	80	−14	56
16	Burton Albion	46	14	11	21	51	67	−16	53
17	Lincoln City	46	14	10	22	55	63	−8	52
18	Shrewsbury Town	46	12	14	20	47	51	−4	50
19	Morecambe	46	10	12	24	57	88	−31	42
20	Fleetwood Town	46	8	16	22	62	82	−20	40

Source: EFL Official Website
Rules for classification: 1) Points; 2) Goal difference; 3) Number of goals scored; 4) Head-to-head results; 5) Wins; 6) Away goals; 7) Penalty points based on yellow and red cards received excluding the last four games of the season (sec 9.5); 8) 12-point sending off offences; 9) If the tie affects the automatic promotion or relegation places, a play-off game or games would be held between the two tied teams

==== Results summary ====
Overall								Home						Away					
Pld	W	D	L	GF	GA	GD	Pts	W	D	L	GF	GA	GD	W	D	L	GF	GA	GD
46	14	11	21	51	67	−16	53	10	6	7	34	26	+8	4	5	14	17	41	−24

Last updated: 30 April 2022.

==== Results by matchday ====
Matchday	1	2	3	4	5	6	7	8	9	10	11	12	13	14	15	16	17	18	19	20	21	22	23	24	25	26	27	28	29	30	31	32	33	34	35	36	37	38	39	40	41	42	43	44	45	46
Ground	A	H	H	A	H	A	H	A	H	H	A	A	H	A	H	A	H	A	H	H	A	A	H	A	A	H	H	A	H	A	H	H	A	A	H	A	A	H	A	A	H	H	A	H	A	H
Result	W	W	W	L	D	D	D	L	L	W	D	L	W	W	L	L	L	L	W	W	L	L	W	D	W	D	L	W	L	L	D	W	L	D	L	L	L	W	L	L	D	D	D	W	L	L
Position	5	4	2	6	7	3	7	10	15	10	9	10	8	7	8	9	13	15	12	10	10	13	12	12	12	11	11	10	12	14	13	12	12	13	14	14	15	14	14	17	17	16	16	16	16	16

Updated to match(es) played on 30 April 2022. Source: Statto.com
A = Away; H = Home; W = Win; D = Draw; L = Loss

==== Matches ====
Burton Albion's fixtures were revealed on 24 June 2021.

7 August 2021 1	Shrewsbury Town	0–1	Burton Albion	Shrewsbury
15:00 BST	Leahy (yellow card) 76'	Report	Brayford 31'; Leak (yellow card) 61'; Powell (yellow card) 87'	Stadium: Montgomery Waters Meadow; Attendance: 5,903; Referee: Anthony Backhouse

14 August 2021 2	Burton Albion	2–1	Ipswich Town	Burton upon Trent
15:00 BST	Taylor (yellow card) 15'; Powell 19'; O'Connor (yellow card) 57'; Akins 86' (pen.); Mancienne (yellow card) 90+2'	Report	O'Connor 22' (o.g.); Fraser (penalty missed) 58'	Stadium: Pirelli Stadium; Attendance: 3,766; Referee: Sam Purkiss

17 August 2021 3	Burton Albion	1–0	Sunderland	Burton upon Trent
19:45 BST	Mancienne (yellow card) 56'; Smith 66'; Powell (yellow card) 84'	Report	Cirkin (yellow card) 37'; Flanagan (yellow card) 90+5'	Stadium: Pirelli Stadium; Attendance: 4,239; Referee: Declan Bourne

21 August 2021 4	Cambridge United	3–0	Burton Albion	Cambridge
15:00 BST	Jones (yellow card) 34'; Smith 53'; Hamer 73', 79' (o.g.)	Report	Mancienne (yellow card) 18'; Brayford (yellow card) 71'	Stadium: Abbey Stadium; Attendance: 4,468; Referee: Ben Toner

27 August 2021 5	Burton Albion	1–1	Cheltenham Town	Burton upon Trent
19:45 BST	Akins 67'; Hamer (yellow card) 82'; Brayford (yellow card) 90+2'	Report	Wright 28'; Lloyd (yellow card) 64'	Stadium: Pirelli Stadium; Attendance: 2,909; Referee: Scott Oldham

6 September 2021 6	Bolton Wanderers	0–0	Burton Albion	Horwich
20:00 BST	Williams (yellow card) 36'; Johnston (yellow card) 90+5'	Report	Hamer (yellow card) 9'; Akins (yellow card) 19'; Brayford (yellow card) 69' (yellow-red card) 86'; Shaughnessy (yellow card) 80'	Stadium: University of Bolton Stadium; Attendance: 13,305; Referee: Josh Smith
Note: Live on Sky Sports

11 September 2021 7	Burton Albion	1–1	Gillingham	Burton upon Trent
15:00 BST	Hemmings 46'	Report	Oliver 18'; Tucker (yellow card) 40'; Ehmer (yellow card) 60'	Stadium: Pirelli Stadium; Attendance: 2,555; Referee: Carl Boyeson

18 September 2021 8	Crewe Alexandra	2–0	Burton Albion	Crewe
15:00 BST	Bostwick 10' (o.g.); Murphy (yellow card) 54'; Bennett 87'	Report	Lakin (yellow card) 3' (yellow-red card) 67'; Borthwick-Jackson (yellow card) 31'; Hemmings (yellow card) 42'	Stadium: Alexandra Stadium; Referee: Ross Joyce

25 September 2021 9	Burton Albion	1–2	Lincoln City	Burton upon Trent
15:00 BST	Bostwick (yellow card) 78'; Shaughnessy 86'	Report	Fiorini 10'; Scully 50'; Eyoma (yellow card) 65'; Montsma (yellow card) 90+5'	Stadium: Pirelli Stadium; Attendance: 3,359; Referee: Craig Hicks

28 September 2021 10	Burton Albion	2–1	Portsmouth	Burton upon Trent
19:45 BST	O'Connor 32'; Smith (yellow card) 36'; Lakin (yellow card) 49'; Jebbison 60', (yellow card) 63'	Report	Hackett-Fairchild 64', (yellow card) 86'; Raggett (yellow card) 83'; Brown (yellow card) 85'; Harness (yellow card) 90+2'	Stadium: Pirelli Stadium; Attendance: 2,810; Referee: Tom Nield

2 October 2021 11	AFC Wimbledon	1–1	Burton Albion	Wimbledon
15:00 BST	McCormick 90'	Report	Hamer (yellow card) 45+3'; Hemmings 66'; Oshilaja (yellow card) 90+6'	Stadium: Plough Lane; Attendance: 7,413; Referee: Lee Swabey

9 October 2021 12	Plymouth Argyle	2–1	Burton Albion	Plymouth
15:00 BST	Grant 15'; Broom 43'; Scarr (yellow card) 60'	Report	Akins 59'	Stadium: Home Park; Attendance: 11,915; Referee: Antony Coggins

15 October 2021 13	Burton Albion	3–2	Morecambe	Burton upon Trent
19:45 BST	O'Connor 6', 49'; Shaughnessy 14'; Hamer (yellow card) 34'; Chapman (yellow card) 57'; Mancienne (yellow card) 78'; Oshilaja (yellow card) 78'	Report	Gibson 3', (yellow card) 90'; Stockton 90+4'	Stadium: Pirelli Stadium; Attendance: 2,477; Referee: Martin Coy

19 October 2021 14	Fleetwood Town	0–1	Burton Albion	Fleetwood
19:45 GMT		Report	Blake-Tracy (yellow card) 33'; O'Connor 36'; Borthwick-Jackson (yellow card) 84'	Stadium: Highbury Stadium; Attendance: 2,226; Referee: Simon Mather

23 October 2021 15	Burton Albion	1–3	Oxford United	Burton upon Trent
15:00 BST	Bostwick (yellow card) 38'; Akins (yellow card) 53'; Lakin 80'; Hemmings (yellow card) 86'	Report	Taylor 1'; Bostwick 43' (o.g.); Brannagan (yellow card) 68'; Henry 84' (pen.)	Stadium: Pirelli Stadium; Attendance: 3,391; Referee: Sam Barrott

30 October 2021 16	Wigan Athletic	2–0	Burton Albion	Wigan
15:00 BST	McClean 9'; Darikwa (yellow card) 36'; Bayliss (yellow card) 39'; Tilt 51'	Report	Smith (red card) 15'; Hamer (yellow card) 57'	Stadium: DW Stadium; Attendance: 9,020; Referee: Carl Brook

13 November 2021 17	Burton Albion	0–1	Charlton Athletic	Burton upon Trent
15:00 GMT	Oshilaja (red card) 18'; Hemmings (yellow card) 41'	Report	Stockley (red card) 17'; Purrington 20'; Lee (yellow card) 28'; Jaiyesimi (yellow card) 31'; Famewo (yellow card) 45+4'	Stadium: Pirelli Stadium; Attendance: 3,555; Referee: Trevor Kettle

20 November 2021 18	Milton Keynes Dons	1–0	Burton Albion	Denbigh
15:00 GMT	Kasumu (yellow card) 45+6'; Watters 65'	Report	Hamer (yellow card) 14'; Hemmings (yellow card) 49'; Mancienne (yellow card) 74'	Stadium: Stadium MK; Attendance: 9,770; Referee: Neil Hair

23 November 2021 19	Burton Albion	4–0	Accrington Stanley	Burton upon Trent
19:45 GMT	Jebbison 28', 50'; Smith 45+4', 49'	Report	Coyle (yellow card) 66'; Mumbongo (yellow card) 82'	Stadium: Pirelli Stadium; Attendance: 1,946; Referee: Darren Drysdale

27 November 2021 20	Burton Albion	2–0	Doncaster Rovers	Burton upon Trent
15:00 GMT	O'Connor 55'; Jebbison 76'; Hemmings (yellow card) 80'	Report	Barlow (yellow card) 29'; Close (yellow card) 39'; Dodoo (yellow card) 76'	Stadium: Pirelli Stadium; Attendance: 2,954; Referee: Peter Wright

7 December 2021 21	Wycombe Wanderers	2–1	Burton Albion	High Wycombe
19:45 GMT	Hanlan 16'; McCleary 45+1'; Forino-Joseph (yellow card) 63'	Report	Mancienne (yellow card) 14'; Jebbison (yellow card) 42'; Shaughnessy 54'; Maddox (yellow card) 72'	Stadium: Adams Park; Attendance: 3,602; Referee: Josh Smith

11 December 2021 22	Rotherham United	3–1	Burton Albion	Rotherham
15:00 GMT	Ladapo 24', 48'; Barlaser 84'	Report	Hemmings 44'; Borthwick-Jackson (yellow card) 90+3'	Stadium: AESSEAL New York Stadium; Attendance: 9,007; Referee: Sam Allison

1 January 2022 23	Burton Albion	4–1	Crewe Alexandra	Burton upon Trent
15:00 GMT	Chapman 6'; Brayford 25'; Hemmings 34'; Jebbison 90+2'	Report	Lowery 19'; Offord (yellow card) 75'; Finney (yellow card) 77'	Stadium: Pirelli Stadium; Attendance: 3,119; Referee: Peter Wright

8 January 2022 24	Cheltenham Town	1–1	Burton Albion	Cheltenham
15:00 GMT	Blair (yellow card) 16'; Wright 21'	Report	Jebbison 51'; Oshilaja (yellow card) 64'; Hamer (yellow card) 78'	Stadium: Jonny-Rocks Stadium; Referee: David Rock

15 January 2022 25	Gillingham	1–3	Burton Albion	Gillingham
15:00 GMT	McKenzie 3'; Tucker (yellow card) 25'; Dempsey (yellow card) 84'	Report	Hamer (yellow card) 16', (goal) 50'; Brayford 79'; Smith 87'	Stadium: Priestfield; Attendance: 4,198; Referee: Thomas Bramall

22 January 2022 26	Burton Albion	1–1	AFC Wimbledon	Burton upon Trent
15:00 GMT	Taylor (yellow card) 45+1'; Oshilaja (yellow card) 57'; Jebbison 77'	Report	Palmer 70'	Stadium: Pirelli Stadium; Attendance: 2,768; Referee: Andrew Kitchen

25 January 2022 27	Burton Albion	0–1	Milton Keynes Dons	Burton upon Trent
19:45 GMT	Hughes (yellow card) 74'; Moult (yellow card) 89'	Report	Twine 90+5'	Stadium: Pirelli Stadium; Attendance: 2,171; Referee: Darren Handley

29 January 2022 28	Lincoln City	1–2	Burton Albion	Lincoln
15:00 GMT	Marquis 49'	Report	Oshilaja (yellow card) 19'; Kokolo (yellow card) 51'; Powell 56'; Hughes 80'	Stadium: LNER Stadium; Attendance: 9,159; Referee: Charles Breakspear

5 February 2022 29	Burton Albion	0–2	Sheffield Wednesday	Burton upon Trent
15:00 GMT	Garratt (yellow card) 72'; Borthwick-Jackson (yellow card) 90+1'; Powell (yellow card) 90+4'	Report	Byers 32'; Luongo (yellow card) 71'; Sow 81'	Stadium: Pirelli Stadium; Attendance: 4,763; Referee: Alan Young

8 February 2022 30	Portsmouth	2–1	Burton Albion	Milton
19:45 GMT	Raggett (yellow card) 5', (goal) 33'; Curtis (yellow card) 34'; Jacobs 41'	Report	Mancienne (yellow card) 18'; Powell (yellow card) 29'; Taylor (yellow card) 47'; Ahadme 50'; Chapman (yellow card) 90+6'	Stadium: Fratton Park; Attendance: 13,407; Referee: Craig Hicks

12 February 2022 31	Burton Albion	2–2	Cambridge United	Burton upon Trent
15:00 GMT	Ahadme 2' (pen.); Gilligan (yellow card) 24'; Kokolo 62'	Report	Knibbs 25'; Smith 72'; Sherring (yellow card) 90+1'	Stadium: Pirelli Stadium; Attendance: 2,578; Referee: Marc Edwards

15 February 2022 32	Burton Albion	3–1	Bolton Wanderers	Burton upon Trent
19:45 GMT	Powell 11'; Brayford 14', 18'; Mancienne (yellow card) 55'	Report	Williams (yellow card) 68'; Charles 90+4'	Stadium: Pirelli Stadium; Attendance: 3,487; Referee: Scott Oldham

19 February 2022 33	Ipswich Town	3–0	Burton Albion	Ipswich
15:00 GMT	Jackson 1'; Evans (yellow card) 27'; Burns 62'; Celina 78'	Report	Blake-Tracy (yellow card) 66'; Niasse (yellow card) 67'	Stadium: Portman Road; Attendance: 20,516; Referee: Carl Brook

22 February 2022 34	Sunderland	1–1	Burton Albion	Sunderland
19:45 GMT	Winchester (yellow card) 32'; Stewart 90+3'	Report	Shaughnessy (yellow card) 50'; Borthwick-Jackson 53'; Saydee (yellow card) 66'	Stadium: Stadium of Light; Attendance: 30,237; Referee: Robert Lewis

26 February 2022 35	Burton Albion	0–2	Shrewsbury Town	Burton upon Trent
15:00 GMT		Report	Bloxham 35'; Pennington 59'	Stadium: Pirelli Stadium; Attendance: 3,258; Referee: Ben Speedie

1 March 2022 36	Sheffield Wednesday	5–2	Burton Albion	Owlerton
19:45 GMT	Palmer 13'; Bannan 28', 87'; Paterson 67', (yellow card) 90+3'; Johnson 75'; Hutchinson (yellow card) 81'	Report	Niasse (yellow card) 25', (goal) 53'; Guedioura 30'; Oshilaja (yellow card) 77'	Stadium: Hillsborough Stadium; Attendance: 20,309; Referee: Sam Barrott

5 March 2022 37	Oxford United	4–1	Burton Albion	Littlemore
15:00 GMT	Baldock 7', 40'; Whyte 35'; Taylor 45'	Report	Saydee (yellow card) 29'; Guedioura 45+2'	Stadium: The Kassam Stadium; Attendance: 7,631; Referee: Sam Purkiss

12 March 2022 38	Burton Albion	3–2	Fleetwood Town	Burton upon Trent
15:00 GMT	Hamer (yellow card) 37'; Niasse 61', 90'; Moult 84'	Report	Nsiala (yellow card) 14'; Oshilaja 18' (o.g.); Garner (yellow card) 36'; Butterworth 57'	Stadium: Pirelli Stadium; Attendance: 2,648; Referee: Oliver Langford

19 March 2022 39	Charlton Athletic	2–0	Burton Albion	Charlton
15:00 GMT	Washington 12'; Blackett-Taylor 42'	Report	Hamer (yellow card) 9'; Niasse (yellow card) 32'; Oshilaja (yellow card) 47'; Shaughnessy (yellow card) 55'; Gilligan (yellow card) 65'; Chapman (yellow card) 79'	Stadium: The Valley; Attendance: 11,348; Referee: Rebecca Welch

2 April 2022 40	Morecambe	3–0	Burton Albion	Morecambe
15:00 BST	Connolly (yellow card) 28'; Gnahoua 41'; Phillips 45+5'; Stockton 46'	Report	Shaughnessy (red card) 43'; Oshilaja (yellow card) 71'	Stadium: The Mazuma Stadium; Attendance: 5,238; Referee: Ross Joyce

9 April 2022 41	Burton Albion	0–0	Plymouth Argyle	Burton upon Trent
15:00 BST	Powell (yellow card) 84'; Maddox (yellow card) 88'	Report	Houghton (yellow card) 82'	Stadium: Pirelli Stadium; Attendance: 3,938; Referee: Leigh Doughty

12 April 2022 42	Burton Albion	0–0	Wigan Athletic	Burton upon Trent
19:45 BST	Mancienne (yellow card) 35'; Niasse (yellow card) 59'; Kokolo (yellow card) 79'	Report	Watts (yellow card) 17'; Power (yellow card) 79'; Kerr (yellow card) 82'	Stadium: Pirelli Stadium; Attendance: 3,589; Referee: Andy Haines

15 April 2022 43	Accrington Stanley	0–0	Burton Albion	Accrington
15:00 BST	McConville (yellow card) 89'	Report	Oshilaja (yellow card) 39'; Mancienne (yellow card) 45+2'	Stadium: Wham Stadium; Attendance: 2,513; Referee: Ollie Yates

19 April 2022 44	Burton Albion	2–0	Rotherham United	Burton upon Trent
19:45 BST	Borthwick-Jackson 3'; Kokolo (yellow card) 45'; Brayford 69'; Hamer (yellow card) 73'	Report	Wood (yellow card) 52'; Rathbone (yellow card) 68'	Stadium: Pirelli Stadium; Attendance: 3,537; Referee: Tom Reeves

23 April 2022 45	Doncaster Rovers	2–0	Burton Albion	Doncaster
15:00 BST	Dodoo 36'; Martin 75'	Report	Ahadme (penalty missed) 33'; Oshilaja (yellow card) 61'; Hamer (yellow card) 79'; Powell (yellow card) 85'	Stadium: Eco-Power Stadium; Attendance: 6,034; Referee: Will Finnie

30 April 2022 46	Burton Albion	1–2	Wycombe Wanderers	Burton upon Trent
12:30 BST	Mancienne (yellow card) 16'; Hamer (yellow card) 58'; Ahadme 72'	Report	Vokes 43'; Tafazolli (yellow card) 76'; Jacobson (yellow card) 82'; Obita 85'	Stadium: Pirelli Stadium; Attendance: 4,440; Referee: Bobby Madley

=== FA Cup ===
Burton Albion were drawn away to Fleetwood Town in the first round and at home to Port Vale in the second round.

6 November 2021 First round	Fleetwood Town	1–2	Burton Albion	Fleetwood
15:00 GMT	Garner 12'; Clarke (yellow card) 70'	Report	Powell 14'; Jebbison 77'	Stadium: Highbury Stadium; Attendance: 1,362; Referee: Tom Reeves

4 December 2021 Second round	Burton Albion	1–2	Port Vale	Burton-upon-Trent
15:00 GMT	Leak 23'; Shaughnessy (yellow card) 88'	Report	Politic 79', 82'	Stadium: Pirelli Stadium; Attendance: 3,539; Referee: Martin Coy

=== EFL Cup ===
Burton Albion were drawn at home to Oxford United in the first round.

11 August 2021 First round	Burton Albion	1–1 (2–4 p)	Oxford United	Burton upon Trent
19:45 BST	Mousinho 90+6' (o.g.)	Report	Bodin (yellow card) 76'; Holland 85'	Stadium: Pirelli Stadium; Attendance: 1,868; Referee: Seb Stockbridge
	Penalties
	Akins (penalty missed); Shaughnessy (penalty scored); O'Connor (penalty missed); Blake-Tracy (penalty scored)		Sykes (penalty scored); Forde (penalty scored); Agyei (penalty scored); Mousinho (penalty scored)

=== EFL Trophy ===
Burton were drawn into Group C in the Southern section, alongside Milton Keynes Dons and Wycombe Wanderers. On July 7, the group stage matches were confirmed.

Pos	Div	Team	Pld	W	PW	PL	L	GF	GA	GD	Pts	Qualification
1	ACA	Aston Villa U21	3	3	0	0	0	11	5	+6	9	Advance to Round 2
2	L1	Milton Keynes Dons	3	2	0	0	1	6	6	0	6	Advance to Round 2
3	L1	Burton Albion	3	1	0	0	2	8	6	+2	3	
4	L1	Wycombe Wanderers	3	0	0	0	3	2	10	−8	0	

Source: EFL.com

31 August 2021 Group game 1	Burton Albion	1–2	Milton Keynes Dons	Burton upon Trent
19:00 BST	O'Riley 67' (o.g.); Blake-Tracy (yellow card) 71'	Report	Bird 58'; Darling 63'; Jules (yellow card) 66'	Stadium: Pirelli Stadium; Attendance: 690; Referee: Brett Huxtable

5 October 2021 Group game 2	Burton Albion	2–4	Aston Villa U21	Burton upon Trent
19:00 BST	Jebbison 20'; Hemmings 23', (yellow card) 52'; Powell (yellow card) 65'; Amadi-Holloway (yellow card) 89'	Report	Archer 35', 61', 71'; Iroegbunam (yellow card) 43'; Abldeen-Goodridge 51'	Stadium: Pirelli Stadium; Attendance: 1,108; Referee: Chris Sarginson

9 November 2021 Group game 3	Wycombe Wanderers	0–5	Burton Albion	High Wycombe
19:00 GMT	Parsons (yellow card) 85'	Report	Amadi-Holloway (yellow card) 45+3', (goal) 50', 71', 90+3'; Lakin 75'; Smith 76'	Stadium: Adams Park; Attendance: 593; Referee: Ben Speedie

=== Birmingham Senior Cup ===
Albion were drawn away to Stratford Town in the first round.

21 September 2021 First round	Stratford Town	2–2 (0–3 p)	Burton Albion	Boldmere
19:45 BST	James 30', 83'	Report	Patrick 43'; Maddox 60'	Stadium: Trevor Brown Memorial Ground; Referee: David Hinton

== Transfers ==
=== Transfers in ===
Date	Position	Nationality	Name	From	Fee	Ref.
1 July 2021	LB	(England)	Frazer Blake-Tracy	(England) Peterborough United	Free transfer	
1 July 2021	LB	(England)	Cameron Borthwick-Jackson	(England) Oldham Athletic	Free transfer	
1 July 2021	DM	(England)	Bryn Morris	(England) Portsmouth	Free transfer	
1 July 2021	CF	(England)	Louis Moult	(England) Preston North End	Free transfer	
1 July 2021	LB	(Republic of Ireland)	Thomas O'Connor	(England) Southampton	Free transfer	
1 July 2021	CB	(England)	Deji Oshilaja	(England) Charlton Athletic	Free transfer	
1 July 2021	LW	(England)	Omari Patrick	(England) Carlisle United	Free transfer	
1 July 2021	DM	(Republic of Ireland)	Conor Shaughnessy	(England) Rochdale	Free transfer	
23 July 2021	CF	(Wales)	Aaron Amadi-Holloway	(India) East Bengal	Free transfer	
27 July 2021	CB	(Wales)	Ryan Leak	(Spain) Burgos	Free transfer	
31 August 2021	CM	(England)	Charlie Lakin	(England) Birmingham City	Undisclosed	
11 January 2022	LB	(France)	Williams Kokolo	(England) Middlesbrough	Undisclosed	
13 January 2022	SS	(Morocco)	Gassan Ahadme	(England) Norwich City	Undisclosed	
31 January 2022	CB	(England)	Sam Hughes	(England) Leicester City	Undisclosed	
17 February 2022	CF	(Senegal)	Oumar Niasse	(England) Huddersfield Town	Free transfer	
25 February 2022	CM	(Algeria)	Adlène Guedioura	(England) Sheffield United	Free transfer	

=== Loans in ===
Date from	Position	Nationality	Name	From	Date until	Ref.
1 July 2021	GK	(England)	Ellery Balcombe	(England) Brentford	End of season	
9 July 2021	AM	(England)	Jacob Maddox	(Portugal) Vitória	End of season	
31 August 2021	RW	(England)	Harry Chapman	(England) Blackburn Rovers	January 2022	
31 August 2021	CB	(England)	Sam Hughes	(England) Leicester City	January 2022	
31 August 2021	CF	(Canada)	Daniel Jebbison	(England) Sheffield United	End of season	
31 January 2022	RW	(England)	Harry Chapman	(England) Blackburn Rovers	End of season	
31 January 2022	GK	(Czech Republic)	Matěj Kovář	(England) Manchester United	End of season	
31 January 2022	CF	(England)	Christian Saydee	(England) Bournemouth	End of season	

=== Loans out ===
Date from	Position	Nationality	Name	To	Date until	Ref.
6 September 2021	DF	(England)	Thierry Latty-Fairweather	(England) Grantham Town		
11 September 2021	FW	(England)	Callum Niven	(England) Redditch United	9 October 2021	
19 November 2021	LB	(England)	Kieran Wallace	(England) York City	3 January 2022	
20 November 2021	GK	(Republic of Ireland)	Kieran O'Hara	(England) Scunthorpe United	27 November 2021	
26 November 2021	MF	(England)	Ben Radcliffe	(England) Mickleover	24 December 2021	
26 November 2021	MF	(England)	Charlie Williams	(England) Redditch United	24 December 2021	
4 January 2022	CB	(England)	Michael Bostwick	(England) Stevenage	End of season	
22 January 2022	DF	(England)	Thierry Latty-Fairweather	(England) Guiseley	End of season	
28 January 2022	CF	(Wales)	Aaron Amadi-Holloway	(England) Barrow	End of season	
31 January 2022	DM	(England)	Bryn Morris	(England) Hartlepool United	End of season	
25 February 2022	GK	(England)	Callum Hawkins	(England) Leamington	End of season	
25 February 2022	FW	(England)	Tom Hewlett	(England) Redditch United	25 March 2022	
22 March 2022	FW	(England)	Callum Niven	(England) Mickleover		
22 March 2022	MF	(England)	Charlie Williams	(England) Leamington	End of season	

=== Transfers out ===
Date	Position	Nationality	Name	To	Fee	Ref.
30 June 2021	CB	(Scotland)	Jevan Anderson	(Scotland) Cove Rangers	Released	
30 June 2021	CB	(England)	Tom Armitage	(England) Nuneaton Borough	Released	
30 June 2021	LB	(England)	Colin Daniel	(England) Exeter City	Released	
30 June 2021	RB	(Wales)	Neal Eardley		Released	
30 June 2021	CM	(Australia)	Ryan Edwards	(South Korea) Busan IPark	Contract expired	
30 June 2021	CF	(England)	Mike Fondop	(England) Hartlepool United	Released	
30 June 2021	CM	(England)	Ben Fox	(England) Grimsby Town	Released	
30 June 2021	LB	(Scotland)	Owen Gallacher	(England) Crawley Town	Released	
30 June 2021	RB	(England)	Ben Hart	(England) Tamworth	Released	
30 June 2021	LB	(England)	Reece Hutchinson	(England) Cheltenham Town	Released	
30 June 2021	CB	(Republic of Ireland)	John-Joe O'Toole	(England) Mansfield Town	Released	
30 June 2021	CM	(Republic of Ireland)	Stephen Quinn	(England) Mansfield Town	Released	
30 June 2021	CF	(England)	Luke Varney	(England) Quorn	Released	
31 August 2021	CF	(Antigua and Barbuda)	Josh Parker		Mutual consent	
6 January 2022	LW	(England)	Omari Patrick	(England) Carlisle United	Free transfer	
13 January 2022	CF	(England)	Kane Hemmings	(England) Tranmere Rovers	Undisclosed	
20 January 2022	RW	(Grenada)	Lucas Akins	(England) Mansfield Town	Free transfer	
28 January 2022	LB	(England)	Kieran Wallace	(England) Mansfield Town	Free transfer	
31 January 2022	DM	(Republic of Ireland)	Thomas O'Connor	(Wales) Wrexham	Undisclosed	
1 February 2022	GK	(Republic of Ireland)	Kieran O'Hara	(England) Fleetwood Town	Free transfer	
