= Ciaran Gilligan =

English footballer (born 2002)

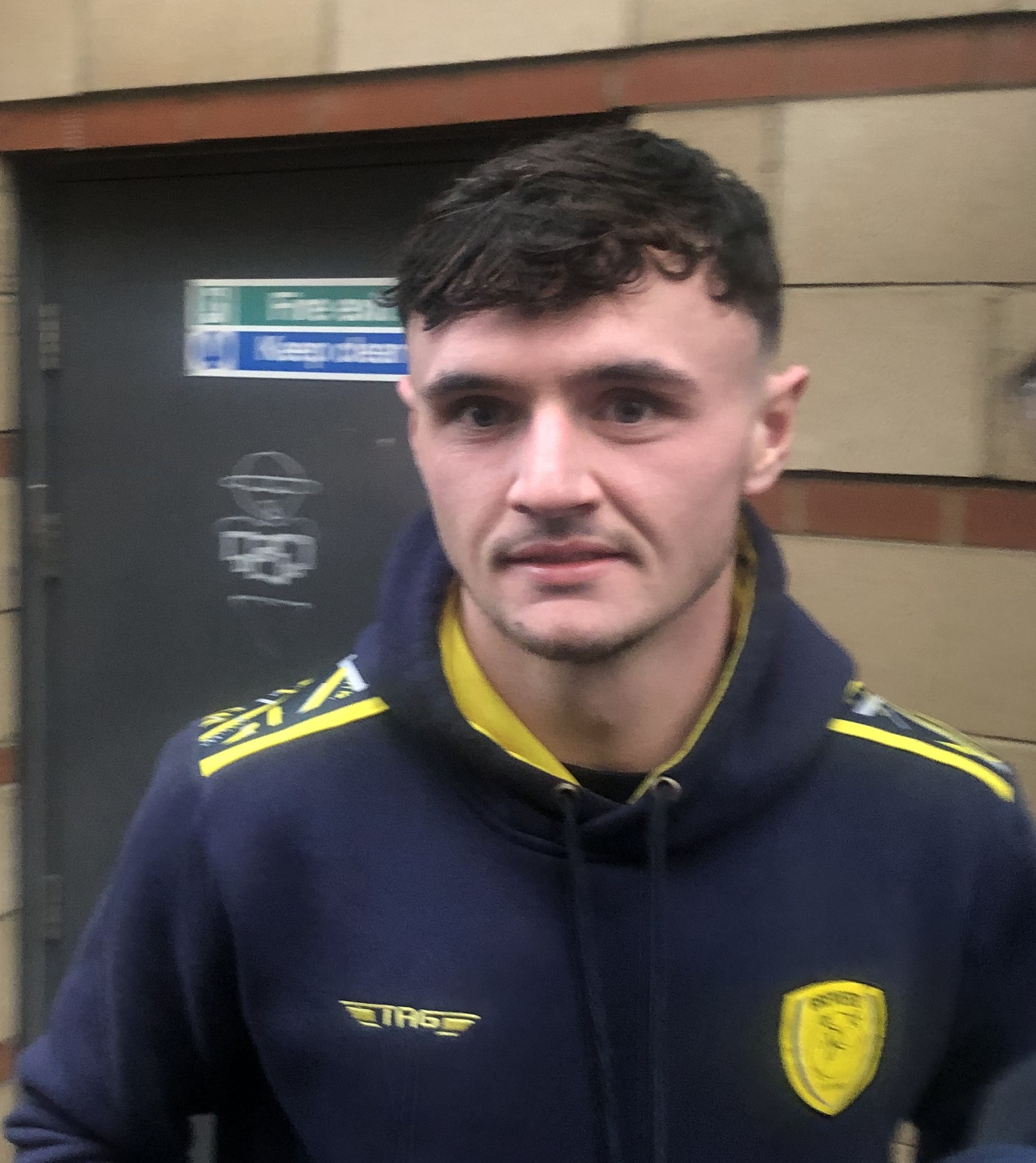
- Ciaran Gilligan in 2024.

Personal information
- Full name: Ciaran Patrick Gilligan
- Date of birth: 5 February 2002 (age 24)
- Place of birth: Derby, England
- Height: 5 ft 11 in (1.80 m)
- Position: Midfielder

Team information
- Current team: Burton Albion
- Number: 25

Youth career
- –2020: Burton Albion

Senior career*
Years	Team	Apps	(Gls)
2020–	Burton Albion	60	(1)
2025–2026	→ Aldershot Town (loan)	4	(1)
- * Club domestic league appearances and goals as of 13:50, 16 January 2026 (UTC)

Ciaran Patrick Gilligan (born 5 February 2002) is a professional footballer who plays as a midfielder for EFL League One club Burton Albion. Born in England, he has represented the Republic of Ireland as a youth international.

== Club career ==
Born in Derby, Gilligan signed his first professional contract with Burton in June 2020. Gilligan joined Burton Albion's academy at under-8 level. He broke into the club's first team in the 2020–21 season, and made his full debut for the club in a 3–3 EFL Trophy draw against Peterborough United on 8 September 2020. He made his first League One start on 17 October 2020 against Bristol Rovers. In doing so, he became the first Burton player to progress through every age group of Burton's youth system before appearing in the first team. In November 2020, Gilligan signed a new contract with the club, valid until summer 2022, with the option for a further year. Over the course of the season, he made 22 appearances, 18 of which were in the league. He missed a number of games during the second half of the 2021–22 season through a hamstring injury. In April 2022, he signed a new contract until summer 2024. He made 10 appearances over the 2021–22 season in total. Gilligan picked up a further hamstring injury in September 2022.

On 10 February 2024, he scored his first senior goal with a "looping shot" in a 2–1 win away at Bristol Rovers.

On 17 October 2025, Gilligan joined National League club Aldershot Town on loan for the remainder of the season. On 16 January 2026, it was announced that Gilligan had returned to Burton Albion following the early conclusion of his loan.

== International career ==
Gilligan was called up to a training camp for the Republic of Ireland under-19 team in May 2021. In March 2022, he was called up to the under-20 team for a fixture against an Ireland Amateurs team.

== Career statistics ==
As of match played 8 November 2025

Appearances and goals by club, season and competition
Club	Season	League			FA Cup		EFL Cup		Other		Total	
Club	Season	Division	Apps	Goals	Apps	Goals	Apps	Goals	Apps	Goals	Apps	Goals
Burton Albion	2020–21	League One	18	0	0	0	1	0	3 (Note: Appearances in the EFL Trophy)	0	22	0
Burton Albion	2021–22	League One	8	0	0	0	0	0	2	0	10	0
Burton Albion	2022–23	League One	6	0	0	0	0	0	2	0	8	0
Burton Albion	2023–24	League One	15	1	1	0	1	0	2	0	19	1
Burton Albion	2024–25	League One	12	0	1	0	0	0	3	0	16	0
Burton Albion	2025–26	League One	1	0	0	0	1	0	1	0	3	0
Burton Albion	Total		60	1	2	0	3	0	13	0	78	1
Aldershot Town (loan)	2025–26	National League	4	1	1	0	—		1 (Note: Appearance in the National League Cup)	0	6	1
Career total			64	2	3	0	3	0	14	0	84	2
