= Thierry Latty-Fairweather =

English footballer (born 2002)

Personal information
- Full name: Thierry Ricky Everton Ashton Latty-Fairweather
- Date of birth: 5 December 2002 (age 23)
- Place of birth: Birmingham, West Midlands, England
- Height: 6 ft 3 in (1.91 m)
- Position: Left-back

Team information
- Current team: Barrow

Youth career
- 2016–2019: Nottingham Forest

Senior career*
Years	Team	Apps	(Gls)
2019–2023	Burton Albion	4	(0)
2021	→ Grantham Town (loan)	12	(1)
2022	→ Guiseley (loan)	21	(1)
2022–2023	→ Hereford (loan)	22	(1)
2023–2025	York City	21	(2)
2024–2025	→ Maidenhead United (loan)	34	(1)
2025–2026	FC Halifax Town	35	(1)
2026–	Barrow	0	(0)
- * Club domestic league appearances and goals as of 15:00, 5 August 2026 (UTC)

Thierry Ricky Everton Ashton Latty-Fairweather (born 5 December 2002) is an English professional footballer who plays as a left-back for National League club Barrow.

== Early life ==
Thierry Ricky Everton Ashton Latty-Fairweather was born on 5 December 2002 in Birmingham, West Midlands, where he grew up.

== Career ==
=== Burton Albion ===
Latty-Fairweather is a former youth academy player of Nottingham Forest. He joined the academy of Burton Albion in the summer of 2019 following his release from his previous club.

After loan spells at non-league clubs Grantham Town and Guiseley in the 2021–22 season, he joined National League North club Hereford at the beginning of the 2022–23 season, before being recalled by Burton Albion in March 2023. He made his EFL League One debut in April 2023, playing the full 90 minutes in a 0–0 draw against Cheltenham Town.

Latty-Fairweather was released by Burton at the end of the 2022–23 season.

=== York City ===
On 4 July 2023, Latty-Fairweather signed for National League club York City. He made his York debut as an 85th minute substitute in the opening fixture of the season. He scored his first goal for York on his fifth appearance, a 3–0 home win against Southend United in the National League.

Latty-Fairweather joined Maidenhead United on a one-month loan on 20 August 2024. This was later extended until the end of the season. He was released by York at the end of the campaign.

=== FC Halifax Town ===
Latty-Fairweather joined FC Halifax Town for the 2025-26 season. He scored one goal in 44 appearances for the Shaymen.

=== Barrow ===
Latty-Fairweather signed for Barrow on 5 August 2026.

== Career statistics ==
As of end of 2025-26 season

Appearances and goals by club, season and competition
Club	Season	League			FA Cup		League Cup		Other		Total	
Club	Season	Division	Apps	Goals	Apps	Goals	Apps	Goals	Apps	Goals	Apps	Goals
Burton Albion	2020–21	EFL League One	0	0	0	0	0	0	1 (Note: Appearance(s) in EFL Trophy)	0	1	0
Burton Albion	2021–22	EFL League One	0	0	0	0	0	0	0	0	0	0
Burton Albion	2022–23	EFL League One	4	0	0	0	0	0	0	0	4	0
Burton Albion	Total		4	0	0	0	0	0	1	0	5	0
Grantham Town (loan)	2021–22	Northern Premier League; Premier Division	12	1	1	0	—		1 (Note: Appearance(s) in FA Trophy)	0	14	1
Guiseley (loan)	2021–22	National League North	21	1	—		—		—		21	1
Hereford (loan)	2022–23	National League North	22	1	2	0	—		0	0	24	1
York City	2023–24	National League	21	2	2	0	—		1	0	24	2
York City	2024–25	National League	0	0	0	0	—		0	0	0	0
York City	Total		21	2	2	0	0	0	1	0	24	2
Maidenhead United (loan)	2024–25	National League	34	1	2	0	—		3 (Note: One appearance in FA Trophy; two appearances in National League Cup)	0	39	1
FC Halifax Town	2025–26	National League	35	1	2	0	—		7 (Note: Two appearances in FA Trophy; five appearances in National League Cup)	0	44	1
Career total			149	7	9	0	0	0	13	0	171	7
