= Joe Powell (footballer, born 1998) =

English footballer

Personal information
- Full name: Joe James Powell
- Date of birth: 30 October 1998 (age 28)
- Place of birth: Canning Town, England
- Height: 5 ft 10 in (1.78 m)
- Position: Midfielder

Team information
- Current team: Salford City
- Number: 6

Youth career
- –2016: West Ham United

Senior career*
Years	Team	Apps	(Gls)
2016–2020	West Ham United	0	(0)
2019	→ Northampton Town (loan)	10	(2)
2020–2024	Burton Albion	163	(19)
2024–2026	Rotherham United	76	(1)
2026–	Salford City	8	(3)
- * Club domestic league appearances and goals as of 26 May 2026 (UTC)

Joe James Powell (born 30 October 1998) is an English professional footballer who plays as a midfielder for League Two club Salford City.

== Career ==
Powell was raised in Canning Town and joined West Ham United at the age of eight. He signed his first professional contract with the club in January 2015, and signed a renewed three-year deal in May 2016.

On 26 September 2018, Powell made his first team debut in an 8–0 victory in the EFL Cup against Macclesfield Town at the London Stadium, in which fellow debutants Conor Coventry and Grady Diangana also featured. In January 2019, Powell joined Northampton Town on loan until the end of the 2018–19 season.

After returning from loan with Northampton, in May 2019, Powell signed a one-year extension to his contract.

=== Burton Albion ===
He signed for Burton Albion on 14 January 2020 on a two-and-a-half-year deal.

Powell agreed a new two-year contract in July 2022.

=== Rotherham United ===
In May 2024, it was announced that Powell would be joining Rotherham United on a free transfer.

=== Salford City ===
On 20 June 2026, it was announced that Powell would be joining Salford City on 1 July 2026.

== Personal life ==
Powell's brother, Jack, is also a professional footballer.

== Career statistics ==
As of end of 2025–26 season

Appearances and goals by club, season and competition
Club	Season	League			FA Cup		League Cup		Other		Total	
Club	Season	Division	Apps	Goals	Apps	Goals	Apps	Goals	Apps	Goals	Apps	Goals
West Ham United U23	2016–17	–							2 (Note: Appearance(s) in EFL Trophy)	0	2	0
West Ham United U23	2017–18	–							2	0	2	0
West Ham United U23	2018–19	–							1	0	1	0
West Ham United U23	2019–20	–							3	2	3	2
West Ham United U23	Total		0	0	0	0	0	0	8	2	8	2
West Ham United	2018–19	Premier League	0	0	0	0	1	0	—		1	0
West Ham United	2019–20	Premier League	0	0	0	0	0	0	—		0	0
West Ham United	Total		0	0	0	0	1	0	0	0	1	0
Northampton Town (loan)	2018–19	League Two	10	2	—		—		—		10	2
Burton Albion	2019–20	League One	10	3	—		—		0	0	10	3
Burton Albion	2020–21	League One	39	6	1	0	2	0	2	3	44	9
Burton Albion	2021–22	League One	34	3	1	1	1	0	2	0	38	4
Burton Albion	2022–23	League One	36	2	2	1	1	0	4	2	43	5
Burton Albion	2023–24	League One	44	5	2	0	1	0	4	0	51	5
Burton Albion	Total		163	19	6	2	5	0	12	5	186	26
Rotherham United	2024–25	League One	46	1	1	0	2	0	6	0	55	1
Rotherham United	2025–26	League One	30	0	1	0	2	0	3	1	36	1
Rotherham United	Total		76	1	2	0	4	0	9	1	91	2
Salford City	2026–27	League Two	0	0	0	0	0	0	0	0	0	0
Career total			249	22	8	2	10	0	29	8	296	32
