= John Brayford =

English footballer

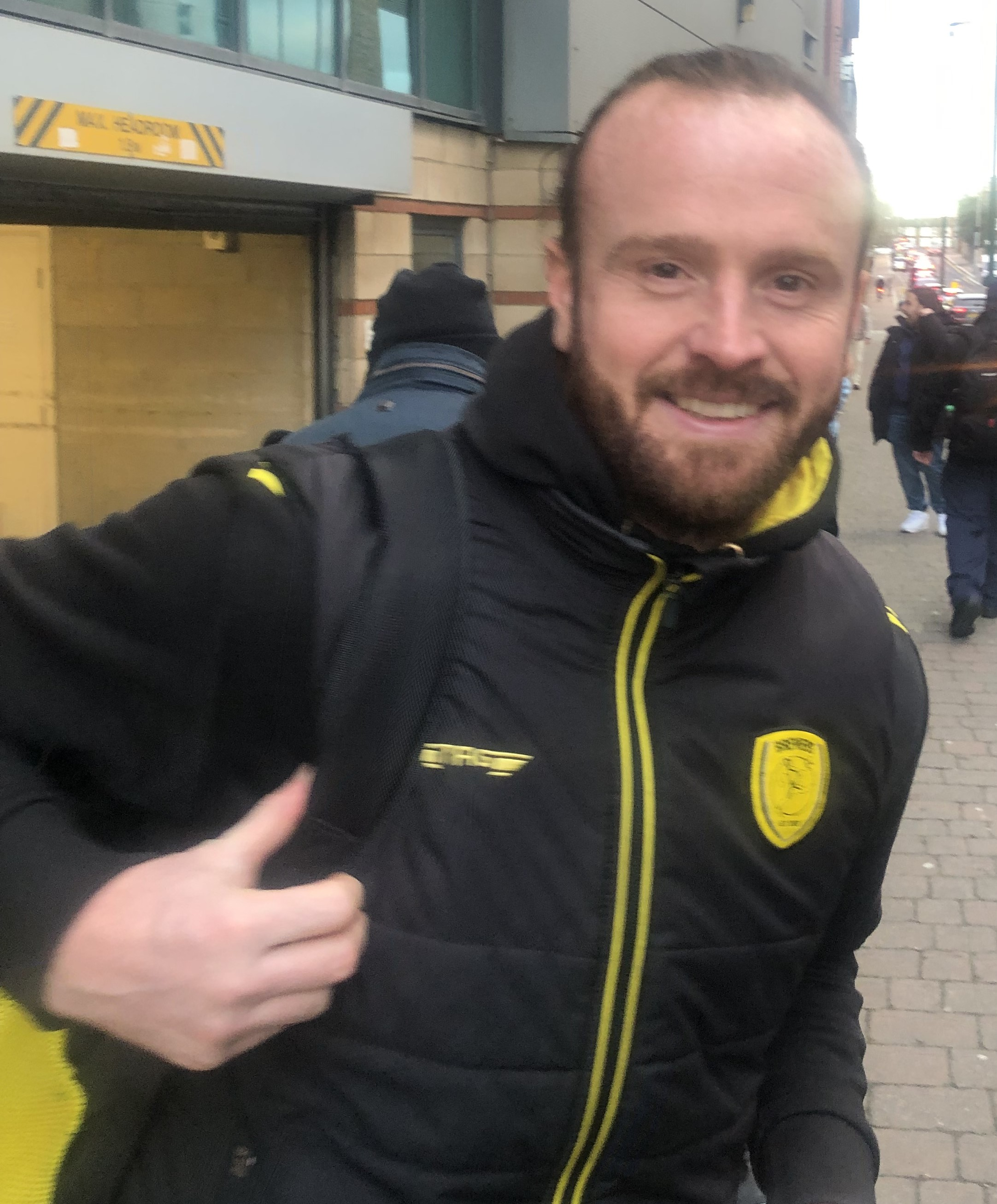
- Brayford in 2024.

Personal information
- Full name: John Robert Brayford
- Date of birth: 29 December 1987 (age 38)
- Place of birth: Stoke-on-Trent, England
- Height: 1.78 m (5 ft 10 in)
- Position: Defender

Team information
- Current team: Burton Albion (first-team coach)

Youth career
- Manchester City
- –2006: Burton Albion

Senior career*
Years	Team	Apps	(Gls)
2006–2008	Burton Albion	77	(7)
2008–2010	Crewe Alexandra	81	(2)
2010–2013	Derby County	109	(3)
2013–2015	Cardiff City	26	(0)
2014	→ Sheffield United (loan)	15	(1)
2015–2017	Sheffield United	44	(2)
2016–2017	→ Burton Albion (loan)	33	(0)
2017–2024	Burton Albion	249	(21)
Total		634	(36)

International career
2007–2008	England C	7	(0)
- * Club domestic league appearances and goals

John Robert Brayford (born 29 December 1987) is an English professional football coach and former player who played as a defender. He is first-team coach of EFL League One club Burton Albion.

Born in Stoke-on-Trent, Staffordshire, he began his playing career at Burton, which was then a non-League club, before moves to Crewe Alexandra and Derby County preceded his time at Cardiff City. He also spent time on loan at Sheffield United prior to joining permanently, and returned to Burton Albion on a permanent basis in 2017.

Brayford made seven appearances for the England C team.

== Career ==
=== Early career ===
As a youth player, Brayford had played for Manchester City but was released by the club at a young age. He instead joined non-League side Burton Albion, becoming the first graduate of the club's revamped youth academy. He made almost 80 league appearances, before signing for League One side Crewe Alexandra on a three-year contract for an undisclosed fee on 1 September 2008. Burton later revealed that the fee was an initial up-front payment of £80,000, which would be raised to £130,000 if he were to progress into the first team. He made his debut for the club in a 3–0 defeat to Scunthorpe United on 11 October. Although Brayford's first season with Crewe ended in relegation for the club, it was a successful season on a personal level, as he won the Fans' Player of the Season, and attracted the interest of several bigger clubs.

In the summer of 2009, Crewe confirmed Brayford's former manager Nigel Clough was interested in taking Brayford to Derby County, and that they were prepared to sell him to a club that matched Crewe's valuation of the player. No deal materialised however and Brayford remained with Crewe for the full 2009–10 season, missing just one game and being named captain. Starting the season at right back, he finished it at centre half and earned a place in the PFA League Two Team of the Season as well as retaining the club's Player of the Season award.

With this form, Derby's long standing interest seemed to have reached its conclusion with reports that the Crewe had agreed a deal for £400,000 plus add-ons, though this was denied by Crewe boss Dario Gradi. Brayford was again linked with Derby as part of a joint £1m move to the Rams with teammate James Bailey, with Crewe confirming that an offer for the pair, of around £1m, rising to £1.3m with add-ons and a percentage sell on clause, had been accepted.

=== Derby County ===
Brayford formally completed his move to Derby County on 19 May 2010 for an undisclosed fee, signing a three-year deal. With the sale of Paul Connolly to Leeds United, Brayford found himself as the only naturally right sided defender at the club and was placed straight into the first team during the club's 2010–11 pre-season fixtures. Brayford kept his place when the 2010–11 Championship season began, and played every minute of all Derby's 48 league and cup matches during the season. Although primarily employed as a right back, consistent injuries to other members of the Derby defence saw Brayford employed at centre-back and left-back through the course of the campaign. Earning plaudits for his ability to combine an attacking role with his defensive duties, Brayford scored once (in a 4–1 home victory over Watford) and assisted three times, and was considered one of the star performers as Derby initially challenged for promotion (being 4th in the table in November 2010) before a run of 4 wins in 24 games saw them plummet down to 19th in the table by the end of April. He was named the Derby County Supporters' Club Player of the Year at a Gala Dinner on 19 April 2011, before picking up the Jack Stamps Trophy before the final home game of the season against Bristol City on 30 April, having won the voting by a "considerable margin."

In August 2011, Brayford signed a new contract extending his stay at the club until the summer of 2014. He appeared in Derby's first ten games of the season, as Derby had their best start to a season for over 106 years, picking up 19 points from the first 10 games to sit third in the table. However, an injury in training, prior to the match against league leaders Southampton, ended a run of 59 consecutive appearances and caused him to miss his first minutes of Derby action since joining 15 months previously. In his absence, Derby recorded just five points from six games to fall out of the play off places. Brayford returned in a 2–0 defeat against Hull City on 19 November 2011, however he picked up a thigh injury in the following game. keeping him out of action for a further three weeks. Having returned to the side, a recurrence of his thigh injury in February ruled Brayford out for a further six weeks. Brayford returned to the first team squad in April 2012, but was unable to reclaim a regular spot in Derby's starting eleven.

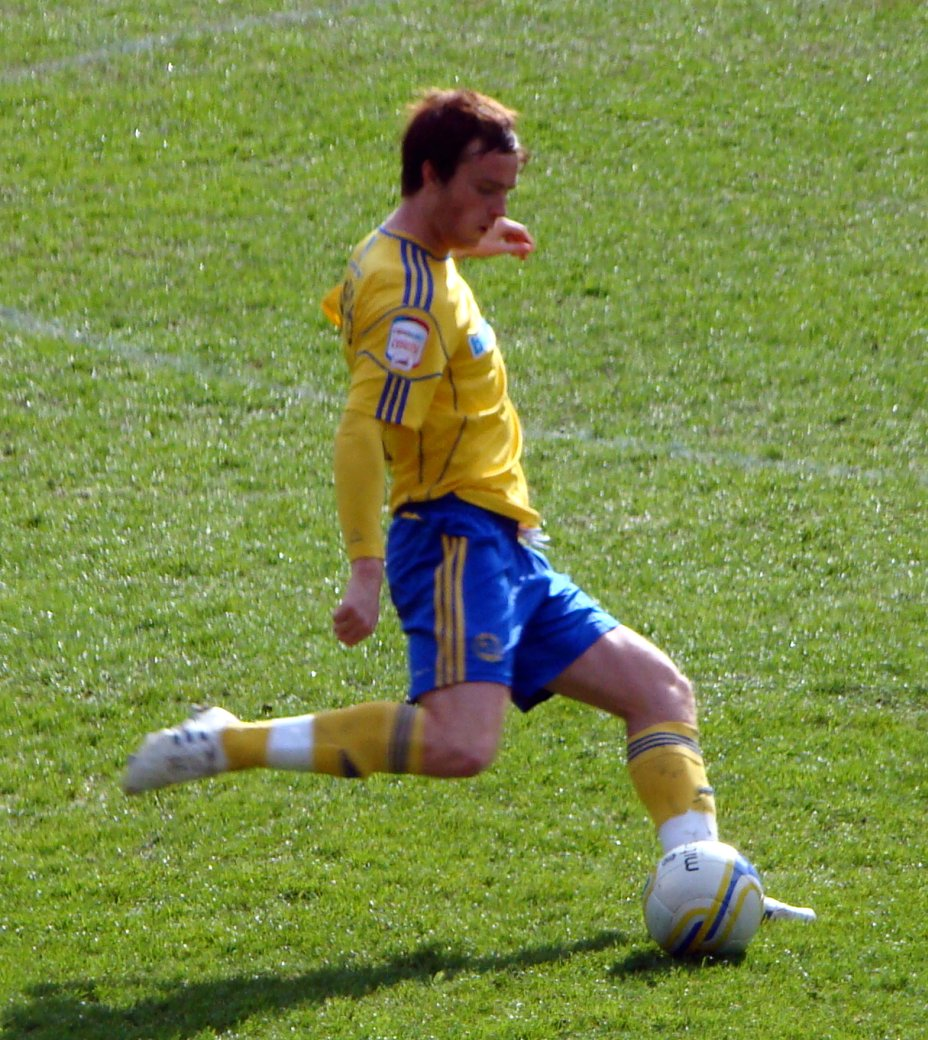
Brayford playing for Derby County in 2012

Brayford started the 2012–13 season as the regular starter at right back once more and scored his first goal in over two years in a 4–1 win at home to Blackpool. In November, Brayford was linked with a move to Premier League side West Ham United amid rumours that Derby needed to raise funds in the summer, although Rams manager Nigel Clough denied the rumours. During the January transfer window, Brayford was linked with a move to Championship leaders Cardiff City, but after the window closed he dismissed the rumours and stated his intention to stay at Derby. Brayford's ever-present role in Derby's starting eleven during the season was apparently ended in early March when he sustained a torn hamstring. Brayford did return for the final five games of the season, but having only a year left on his contract, manager Nigel Clough expected Brayford to move to a Premier League club during the summer of 2013. The first confirmed interest in Brayford came at the end of June 2013, when a £1m bid from Wigan Athletic was rejected by Derby. A month later, a £1.5 million bid from Premier League newcomers Cardiff City was accepted.

=== Cardiff City ===
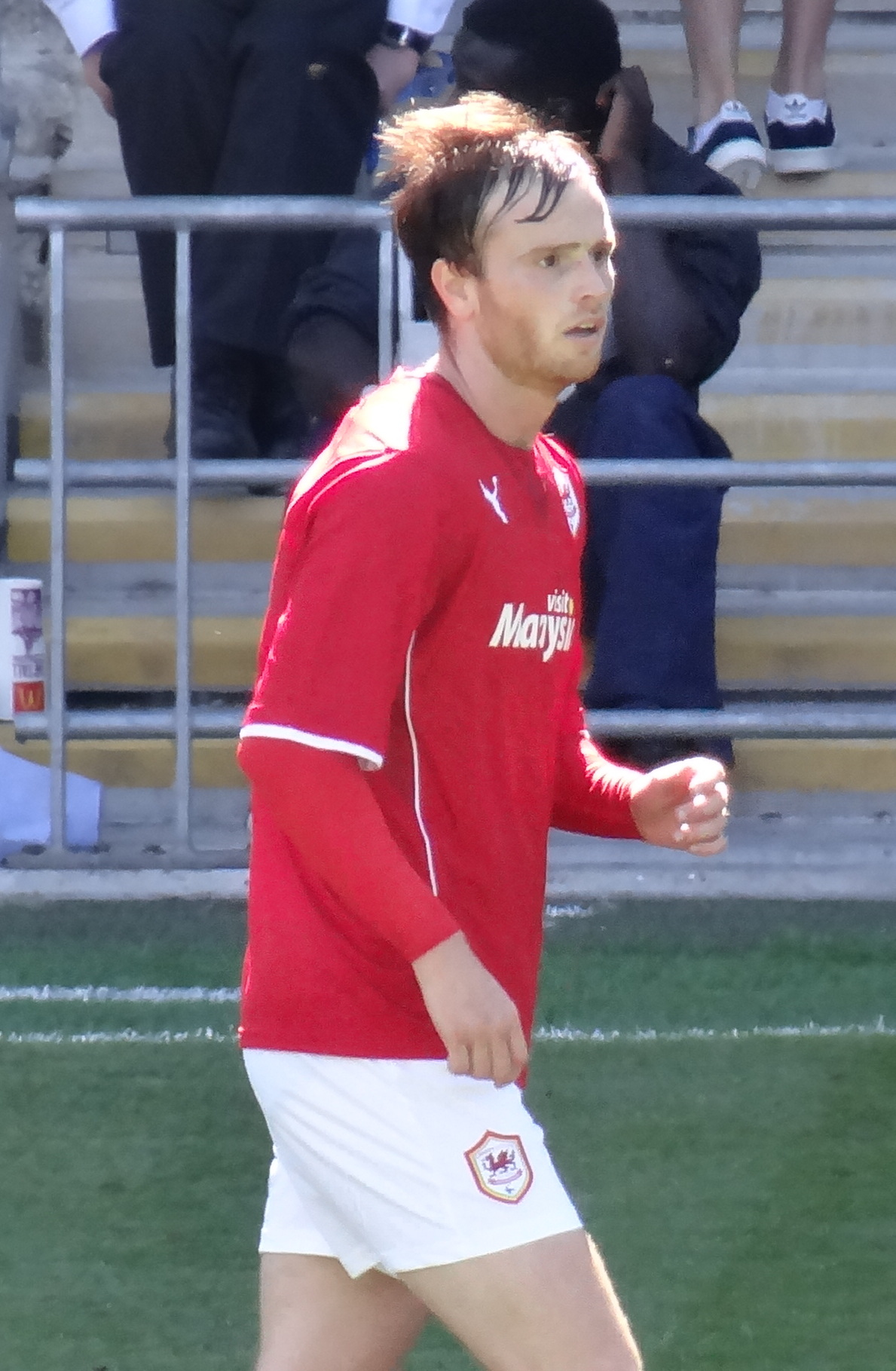
Brayford playing for Cardiff City in 2013.

On 26 July 2013 Brayford signed a four-year contract with Cardiff City, becoming their second signing of the summer. Brayford was unable to make the break into Cardiff's first team however, playing only two League Cup matches during the first half of the 2013–14 season. He failed to even make the substitutes' bench in any other match, and did not even make the Cardiff bench for their league games.

On 24 January 2014 Brayford joined Sheffield United on loan until the end of the season, to be reunited with Nigel Clough for the third time in his career, and made his debut two days later in a 1–1 FA Cup draw with Fulham. Sporting a beard during his time with the Blades, Brayford became a cult figure with the fans, as the team rose from the bottom of the table to finish seventh and reach the FA Cup semi-final. Brayford finished his loan having played 20 times, scoring twice. Sheffield United had hoped to resign Brayford in the summer transfer window, however Cardiff City manager Ole Gunnar Solskjær insisted that he wanted to give Brayford a chance in the first team following his successful loan.

With Cardiff City back in the Championship following relegation from the Premier League, Brayford became first choice right-back for the Bluebirds and played 28 times in all competitions during the first half of the 2014–15 season. On 23 January 2015, it was confirmed that Cardiff City had rejected a £1.2 million bid from Sheffield United for Brayford.

=== Sheffield United ===
On 24 January 2015, Brayford signed for former loan club Sheffield United on a three-and-a-half-year deal for an undisclosed fee, believed to be around £1.5 million. Brayford later revealed that he took a pay cut to rejoin Sheffield United.

=== Burton Albion ===
Brayford was released by Sheffield United after two and a half years and returned to Burton on 31 August 2017 for a third spell. He signed a two-year deal and would be playing under Nigel Clough's management for a fourth time. He signed a new one-year contract in June 2019. Brayford signed a new two-year contract in June 2022.

Brayford retired from football after his Burton Albion contract ended in July 2024, however was announced as the clubs first team coach.

== Career statistics ==
As of end of 2023–24 season

Appearances and goals by club, season and competition
Club	Season	League			FA Cup		League Cup (Note: Includes Football League Cup/EFL Cup, Conference League Cup)		Other		Total	
Club	Season	Division	Apps	Goals	Apps	Goals	Apps	Goals	Apps	Goals	Apps	Goals
Burton Albion	2005–06	Conference Premier	1	0	0	0	—		0	0	1	0
Burton Albion	2006–07	Conference Premier	25	1	0	0	0	0	2 (Note: Appearances in FA Trophy)	0	27	1
Burton Albion	2007–08	Conference Premier	45	5	4	0	1 (Note: Missing source for lineup in Conference League Cup (Setanta Shield) fifth round against Droylsden)	0	8 (Note: Six appearances and one goal in FA Trophy, two appearances in play-offs)	1	58	6
Burton Albion	2008–09	Conference Premier	6	1	—		—		—		6	1
Burton Albion	Total		77	7	4	0	1	0	10	1	92	8
Crewe Alexandra	2008–09	League One	36	2	4	0	0	0	0	0	40	2
Crewe Alexandra	2009–10	League Two	45	0	1	0	1	0	1 (Note: Appearance in EFL Trophy)	0	48	0
Crewe Alexandra	Total		81	2	5	0	1	0	1	0	88	2
Derby County	2010–11	Championship	46	1	1	0	1	0	—		48	1
Derby County	2011–12	Championship	23	0	2	0	1	0	—		26	0
Derby County	2012–13	Championship	40	2	2	1	1	0	—		43	3
Derby County	Total		109	3	5	1	3	0	—		117	4
Cardiff City	2013–14	Premier League	0	0	0	0	2	0	—		2	0
Cardiff City	2014–15	Championship	26	0	1	0	1	0	—		28	0
Cardiff City	Total		26	0	1	0	3	0	—		30	0
Sheffield United (loan)	2013–14	League One	15	1	5	1	—		—		20	2
Sheffield United	2014–15	League One	22	1	—		—		1 (Note: Appearance in League One play-offs)	0	23	1
Sheffield United	2015–16	League One	19	1	2	0	0	0	0	0	21	1
Sheffield United	2016–17	League One	3	0	—		1	0	—		4	0
Sheffield United	2017–18	Championship	0	0	—		1	0	—		1	0
Sheffield United	Total		59	3	7	1	2	0	1	0	69	4
Burton Albion (loan)	2016–17	Championship	33	0	1	0	—		—		34	0
Burton Albion	2017–18	Championship	28	0	1	0	—		—		29	0
Burton Albion	2018–19	League One	41	3	1	0	6	0	0	0	48	3
Burton Albion	2019–20	League One	32	2	3	1	3	0	2 (Note: Appearances in EFL Trophy)	0	40	3
Burton Albion	2020–21	League One	41	4	1	0	2	0	2	0	46	4
Burton Albion	2021–22	League One	33	6	0	0	1	0	0	0	34	6
Burton Albion	2022–23	League One	43	3	2	0	1	0	4	0	50	3
Burton Albion	2023–24	League One	31	3	0	0	1	0	2	0	34	3
Burton Albion	Total		282	21	9	1	14	0	10	0	315	22
Career total			634	36	31	3	26	0	22	1	711	40

== Honours ==
Individual

- PFA Team of the Year: 2009–10 League Two
- Crewe Alexandra Fans' Player of the Year: 2008–09, 2009–10
- Derby County Fans' Player of the Year: 2010–11
- Burton Albion Players' Player of the Year: 2021–22
- Burton Albion Fans' Player of the Year: 2021–22
- Burton Albion Community Player of the Year: 2021–22
