= Conor Shaughnessy =

Irish footballer (born 1996)

Personal information
- Full name: Conor Glynn Shaughnessy
- Date of birth: 30 June 1996 (age 30)
- Place of birth: Galway, Ireland
- Height: 1.91 m (6 ft 3 in)
- Positions: Centre-back; central midfielder

Team information
- Current team: Portsmouth
- Number: 6

Youth career
- Mervue United
- 2012–2016: Reading
- 2016–2017: Leeds United

Senior career*
Years	Team	Apps	(Gls)
2017–2021	Leeds United	9	(0)
2019	→ Heart of Midlothian (loan)	10	(0)
2019–2020	→ Mansfield Town (loan)	15	(0)
2020	→ Burton Albion (loan)	8	(0)
2021	Rochdale	15	(1)
2021–2023	Burton Albion	57	(4)
2023–	Portsmouth	77	(8)

International career
2011–2012	Republic of Ireland U15	4	(1)
2012	Republic of Ireland U16	2	(0)
2013	Republic of Ireland U17	1	(0)
2012	Republic of Ireland U18	1	(0)
2017–2018	Republic of Ireland U21	3	(0)
- * Club domestic league appearances and goals as of 22:58, 27 July 2026 (UTC)

Conor Glynn Shaughnessy (born 30 June 1996) is an Irish professional footballer who plays as a central defender for EFL Championship club Portsmouth.

He is also able to operate as a central midfielder. He has represented the Republic of Ireland national football team at U15 through to U21 level.

== Club career ==
=== Reading ===
Shaughnessy started his career at English club Reading, joining in 2012 after a successful trial and signing his first professional contract in the summer of 2013. He was a regular for the Reading U18 and U21 teams; however, he never played competitively for the club and was released in May 2016.

=== Leeds United ===
Following a successful trial, Shaughnessy was given a one-year contract with the Leeds United development squad in September 2016. He did not make any first team appearances during the 2016–2017 season. His contract was extended by a year in May 2017, and he made his professional debut in a 3–2 away victory over Bolton Wanderers on 6 August 2017, replacing injured teammate Matthew Pennington at centre back in the 66th minute and promptly giving away a penalty. He made his first start in the following game, on 9 August 2017 in a 4–1 League Cup victory against Port Vale at Elland Road, and first League start six days later against Fulham. He signed a new four-year contract with Leeds the following month. On 7 January 2018, Shaughnessy scored an own goal in Leeds' 2–1 shock defeat to Newport County in the FA Cup.

Shaughnessy picked up a serious ankle injury when he started in Leeds' 0–0 draw against Hull City on 30 January 2018, with head coach Thomas Christiansen revealing Shaughnessy could spend several weeks/months out injured. The injury ultimately ruled Shaughnessy out for the remainder of the season.

On 14 August 2018, Shaughnessy returned to a match-day squad for the first time, when he was named on the bench for Leeds in the EFL Cup fixture against Bolton Wanderers. He made his first appearance after injury when he started against Preston North End on 28 August 2018. The return to form — and from injury — of Leeds' back line limited Shaughnessy's playing time with the first team, but an interview in September 2018 indicated that Head Coach Marcelo Bielsa had firm plans for the youngster in the 2018-19 campaign and beyond.

==== Hearts loan ====
On 7 January 2019, Shaughnessy joined Hearts on a six-month loan deal. He made his debut on 20 January starting for Hearts in a 1–0 win against Livingston in the Scottish FA Cup, before making his league debut on 23 January in the SPL against Dundee.

On 25 May 2019, Shaughnessy received a 2018–19 Scottish Cup runners-up medal after being named on the bench for the Scottish Cup final at Hampden Park after losing 2–1 in the final against Celtic. In total he made 11 appearances for Hearts in all competitions.

==== Mansfield Town loan ====
On 2 September 2019, Shaughnessy joined League Two side Mansfield Town on a season-long loan after failing to fit into Bielsa's immediate plans.

==== Burton Albion loan ====
After his loan at Mansfield was ended early, Shaughnessy signed on loan for League One club Burton Albion on 13 January 2020 for the rest of the 2019–20 season.

=== Rochdale ===
On 1 February 2021, Shaughnessy joined Rochdale on an 18-month contract. His spell at Rochdale lasted just a few months, making 15 appearances and scoring once before leaving Rochdale after their relegation to League Two at the end of the season.

=== Burton Albion ===
On 24 June 2021, Shaughnessy left Rochdale made a permanent move to Burton Albion, on a two-year contract. He made 43 appearances for The Brewers during the 2021–22 season, including three league goals in his 38 League One outings.

Early in the 2022–23 season, the defender was injured in a defeat to Ipswich Town, following a fifth-minute collision with the Ipswich upright and was out for the remainder of August, all of September and October.

=== Portsmouth ===
On 14 June 2023, League One side Portsmouth signed Shaughnessy to a two-year contract, with an option of a third year. On 16 April 2024, Shaughnessy scored an 89th-minute winner in a 3–2 victory over Barnsley, a result that saw his side secure the 2023–24 EFL League One title and promotion to the EFL Championship.

Shaughnessy suffered a calf injury early in the 2024–25 season, leading to him being sidelined from September through the end of 2024 after only two Championship appearances in August. He returned early in the new year for only a brief spell but played out the final league games of the season with Pompey.

A hamstring injury in September 2025 saw Shaughnessy absent from the first team until 29 December 2025 when, as a 64th-minute substitute for Hayden Matthews, he headed home the 69th-minute opener in a home league game against Charlton, for an eventual 2–1 win that Portsmouth snatched in the 98th minute.

== International career ==
Shaughnessy has represented Ireland at U15, U16, U17, U18 and U21 level. After his loan move to Hearts he expressed his hopes that he would get a senior international call up similar to fellow Irish under 21 centre back Jimmy Dunne whom he replaced at Tynecastle.

== Personal life ==
Shaughnessy's elder brother Joe is also a professional footballer who plays for the A-League side Newcastle Jets.

== Career statistics ==
As of match played 7 September 2026

Appearances and goals by club, season and competition
Club	Season	League			National cup (Note: Includes FA Cup, Scottish Cup)		League cup (Note: Includes EFL Cup)		Other		Total	
Club	Season	Division	Apps	Goals	Apps	Goals	Apps	Goals	Apps	Goals	Apps	Goals
Leeds United	2016–17	Championship	0	0	0	0	0	0	0	0	0	0
Leeds United	2017–18	Championship	9	0	1	0	4	0	0	0	14	0
Leeds United	2018–19	Championship	0	0	0	0	1	0	0	0	1	0
Leeds United	2019–20	Championship	0	0	0	0	0	0	0	0	0	0
Leeds United	Total		9	0	1	0	5	0	0	0	15	0
Heart of Midlothian (loan)	2018–19	Scottish Premiership	10	0	1	0	0	0	0	0	11	0
Mansfield Town (loan)	2019–20	League Two	15	0	1	0	0	0	3 (Note: Appearance(s) in EFL Trophy)	0	19	0
Burton Albion (loan)	2019–20	League One	8	0	0	0	0	0	0	0	8	0
Rochdale	2020–21	League One	15	1	0	0	0	0	0	0	15	1
Burton Albion	2021–22	League One	38	3	2	0	1	0	2	0	43	3
Burton Albion	2022–23	League One	19	1	0	0	0	0	0	0	19	1
Burton Albion	Total		57	4	2	0	1	0	2	0	62	4
Portsmouth	2023–24	League One	45	4	1	0	1	0	2	0	49	4
Portsmouth	2024–25	Championship	9	1	0	0	0	0	0	0	9	1
Portsmouth	2025–26	Championship	19	2	1	0	0	0	0	0	20	2
Portsmouth	2026–27	Championship	4	1	0	0	1	0	0	0	5	1
Portsmouth	Total		77	8	2	0	1	0	2	0	83	8
Career total			191	13	7	0	7	0	7	0	213	13

== Honours ==
Hearts

- Scottish Cup runner-up: 2018–19

Portsmouth

- EFL League One: 2023–24

Individual

- EFL League One Team of the Season: 2023–24
- PFA Team of the Year: 2023–24 League One
