= Daniel Jebbison =

Canadian football player (born 2003)

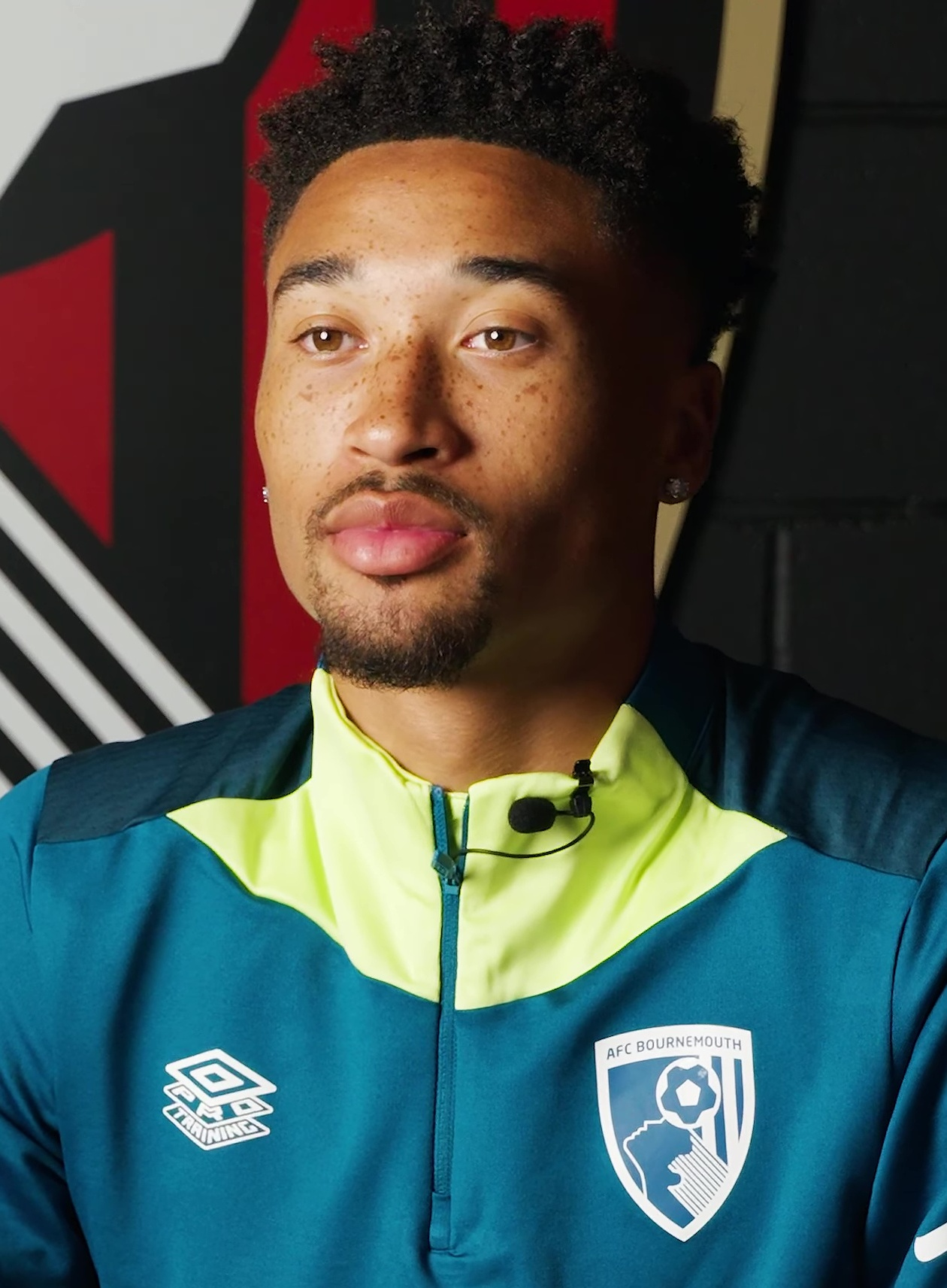
- Jebbison with Bournemouth in 2024

Personal information
- Full name: Daniel David Jebbison
- Date of birth: 13 August 2003 (age 23)
- Place of birth: Oakville, Ontario, Canada
- Height: 6 ft 3 in (1.90 m)
- Position: Forward

Team information
- Current team: Bournemouth
- Number: 29

Youth career
- 2009–2017: ANB Futbol
- 2018–2020: Sheffield United

Senior career*
Years	Team	Apps	(Gls)
2020–2024	Sheffield United	29	(2)
2020–2021	→ Chorley (loan)	2	(0)
2021–2022	→ Burton Albion (loan)	20	(7)
2024–	Bournemouth	19	(1)
2024–2025	→ Watford (loan)	13	(0)
2025–2026	→ Preston North End (loan)	38	(6)

International career^{‡}
2021	England U18	1	(0)
2021–2022	England U19	7	(1)
2022–2023	England U20	5	(1)
2025–	Canada	10	(0)
Medal record
Men's soccer
Representing Canada
CONCACAF Nations League
Third place	2025 United States
Representing England
UEFA European Under-19 Championship
Winner	2022 Slovakia
- * Club domestic league appearances and goals as of September 20, 2026 ‡ National team caps and goals as of November 13, 2026

Daniel David Jebbison (born 13 August 2003) is a Canadian professional soccer player who plays as a forward for Premier League club Bournemouth and the Canada national team.

Born in Canada, he represented England at the youth level from 2021 to 2023 and was part of the team that won the 2022 UEFA European Under-19 Championship, before confirming his allegiance to Canada in 2025 after accepting a call-up.

== Early life ==
Jebbison was born in Oakville, Ontario and began playing soccer at the ANB Futbol youth academy. He lived in Canada until he was 13; in 2017 he relocated to England with his family and they settled in Derby, with Jebbison attending Derby Moor Academy in the Littleover region of Derby. Jebbison joined the Sheffield United Academy in 2018 after a successful trial.

His brother, Jonathan is also a footballer, playing for Heanor Town in the United Counties League until 2022.

== Club career ==
=== Sheffield United ===
After passing through Sheffield United's U18 and U23 development sides, he joined Chorley on a short-term loan on 24 December 2020, having played for them twice. Soon after returning to Sheffield United, he made his professional debut with them in a 2–0 Premier League loss to Crystal Palace on 8 May 2021. Jebbison scored his first goal for the club against Everton on 16 May, becoming the youngest player to score in their first start in the Premier League. On 21 May, he signed his first professional contract.

On 31 August 2021, Jebbison joined League One Burton Albion on loan. On 11 September he made his debut for his loan club, coming off the bench in a 1–1 draw against Gillingham. A couple weeks later on 28 September, Jebbison scored his first goal for Burton in a 2–1 home win against Portsmouth in league action. Jebbison was recalled by Sheffield United on 31 January 2022.

=== Bournemouth ===
On 10 July 2024, Jebbison signed for Premier League club Bournemouth on a four-year deal; although his contract with Sheffield United had expired, Bournemouth reportedly paid a £1.5 million training fee in compensation.

On 30 August 2024, Jebbison joined Championship club Watford on a season-long loan deal. However, he was recalled to Bournemouth on 8 January 2025 after a disappointing spell with the Hertfordshire side, combined with the long-term injuries to both strikers Evanilson and Enes Ünal. His first league goal for Bournemouth came in a 3-1 defeat to Manchester City at the Etihad Stadium on 20 May 2025.

On 20 June 2025, Preston North End announced that Jebbison would join them on loan on 7 July 2025 for the upcoming season. He scored six goals in 40 appearances in all competitions during the campaign, and returned to Bournemouth at the end of the 2025–26 season when the loan expired.

== International career ==
Jebbison was born in Canada to a Jamaican father and English mother, and moved to England in 2017. He was eligible to play for all three senior teams.

=== England ===
He debuted with the England under-18s in a friendly 2–0 win over the Wales under-18s on 29 March 2021. On 18 June, Jebbison was named to Canada's 60-man provisional squad for the 2021 CONCACAF Gold Cup.

On 2 September 2021, Jebbison made his debut for the England U19s during a 2–0 victory over Italy at St. George's Park. He scored his first goal for the under-19s during a 1–1 draw with Germany in Bad Dürrheim on 6 September.

On 17 June 2022, Jebbison was included in the England U19 squad for the 2022 UEFA European Under-19 Championship. He scored against Serbia during the group stage. England won the tournament with a 3–1 extra time victory over Israel on 1 July 2022.

On 24 September 2022, Jebbison made his England U20 debut as a substitute during a 2–1 victory over Morocco at the Pinatar Arena.

On 10 May 2023, he was included in the England squad for the 2023 FIFA U-20 World Cup.

=== Canada ===
On 2 June 2023, Jebbison was named to Canada's 60-man provisional squad for the 2023 CONCACAF Gold Cup.

On 24 February 2025, Jebbison announced he has agreed to represent Canada at the senior level. On 10 March 2025, his request to switch allegiance to Canada was approved by FIFA. He made his debut on March 20, 2025, in a CONCACAF Nations League match against Mexico. He was later named in Canada's squad for the 2025 CONCACAF Gold Cup.

In May 2026, Jebbison was included in Canada's 32-man preliminary squad ahead of the 2026 FIFA World Cup on home soil, but was omitted from the final 26-man roster announced on 29 May 2026.

== Career statistics ==
=== Club ===
As of match played September 20, 2026

Appearances and goals by club, season and competition
Club	Season	League			FA Cup		EFL Cup		Europe		Other		Total	
Club	Season	Division	Apps	Goals	Apps	Goals	Apps	Goals	Apps	Goals	Apps	Goals	Apps	Goals
Sheffield United	2020–21	Premier League	4	1	0	0	0	0	—		—		4	1
Sheffield United	2021–22	Championship	8	0	—		2	0	—		1 (Note: Appearance in Championship play-offs)	0	11	0
Sheffield United	2022–23	Championship	16	1	3	1	0	0	—		—		19	2
Sheffield United	2023–24	Premier League	1	0	0	0	0	0	—		—		1	0
Sheffield United	Total		29	2	3	1	2	0	—		1	0	35	3
Chorley (loan)	2020–21	National League North	2	0	0	0	—		—		0	0	2	0
Burton Albion (loan)	2021–22	League One	20	7	2	1	—		—		1 (Note: Appearance in EFL Trophy)	1	23	9
Bournemouth	2024–25	Premier League	16	1	4	2	1	0	—		—		21	3
Bournemouth	2026–27	Premier League	3	0	0	0	1	0	0	0	—		4	0
Bournemouth	Total		19	1	4	2	2	0	0	0	—		25	3
Watford (loan)	2024–25	Championship	13	0	—		—		—		—		13	0
Preston North End (loan)	2025–26	Championship	38	6	1	0	1	0	—		—		40	6
Career total			121	16	10	4	5	0	0	0	2	1	138	21

=== International ===
As of match played November 13, 2026

Appearances and goals by national team and year
National team	Year	Apps	Goals
Canada	2025	5	0
Canada	2026	5	0
Total		10	0

== Honours ==
England U19

- UEFA European Under-19 Championship: 2022
