= Tom Hewlett =

English footballer

Personal information
- Full name: Thomas Paul Hewlett
- Date of birth: 17 October 2001 (age 25)
- Position: Forward

Team information
- Current team: Shaftesbury

Youth career
- –2020: Burton Albion

Senior career*
Years	Team	Apps	(Gls)
2020–2024	Burton Albion	1	(0)
2020	→ Hednesford Town (loan)	4	(0)
2020	→ Rushall Olympic (loan)	2	(1)
2022	→ Redditch United (loan)	10	(1)
2022	→ Belper Town (loan)	6	(1)
2022	→ Leamington (loan)	10	(3)
2022	→ Hednesford Town (loan)	6	(0)
2023	→ Redditch United (loan)	9	(0)
2023	→ Hereford (loan)	7	(0)
2023–2024	→ Long Eaton United (loan)	10	(1)
2024	→ Stratford Town (loan)	5	(0)
2024	→ Long Eaton United (loan)	6	(1)
2024–2025	Poole Town	36	(4)
2025	Weymouth	6	(1)
2025–	Shaftesbury	0	(0)
- * Club domestic league appearances and goals as of 19:04, 24 September 2025 (UTC)

Thomas Paul Hewlett (born 17 October 2001) is an English footballer who plays as a forward for Southern League Division One South club Shaftesbury.

== Career ==
=== Burton Albion ===
Hewlett signed his first professional contract with Burton Albion in June 2020. He made his senior debut for the club on 8 September 2020 as a substitute in a 3–3 EFL Trophy draw with Peterborough United, in which Burton lost on penalties.

On 3 August 2022, Hewlett joined Northern Premier League Premier Division club Belper Town on a short-term loan. On 25 November 2022, Hewlett joined Hednesford Town on a one-month loan deal.

On 4 August 2023, Hewlett joined National League North club Hereford on a three month loan. He made his debut as a substitute in the opening league fixture of the season.

=== Non-League ===
In May 2024, despite being offered a new short-term contract at Burton, Hewlett opted to sign for Southern League Premier Division South club Poole Town.

On 5 June 2025, it was announced that Hewlett had signed for fellow Southern League Premier Division South club Weymouth. He debuted for Weymouth in the 4–2 friendly win against Portland United on 5 July 2025.

In September 2025, Hewlett joined Southern League Division One South club Shaftesbury.

== Career statistics ==
As of match played 27 April 2024

Appearances and goals by club, season and competition
Club	Season	League			FA Cup		League Cup		Other		Total	
Club	Season	Division	Apps	Goals	Apps	Goals	Apps	Goals	Apps	Goals	Apps	Goals
Burton Albion	2019–20	League One	0	0	0	0	0	0	0	0	0	0
Burton Albion	2020–21	League One	1	0	0	0	0	0	1 (Note: Appearance(s) in EFL Trophy)	0	2	0
Burton Albion	2021–22	League One	0	0	0	0	0	0	0	0	0	0
Burton Albion	2022–23	League One	0	0	0	0	0	0	0	0	0	0
Burton Albion	2023–24	League One	0	0	0	0	0	0	0	0	0	0
Burton Albion	Total		1	0	0	0	0	0	1	0	2	0
Hednesford Town (loan)	2019–20	Southern League Premier Division Central	4	0	—		—		—		4	0
Rushall Olympic (loan)	2020–21	Southern League Premier Division Central	2	1	—		—		1 (Note: Appearance(s) in FA Trophy)	0	3	1
Redditch United (loan)	2021–22	Southern League Premier Division Central	10	1	—		—		—		10	1
Belper Town (loan)	2022–23	Northern Premier League Premier Division	6	1	0	0	—		0	0	6	1
Leamington (loan)	2022–23	National League North	10	3	0	0	—		0	0	10	3
Hednesford Town (loan)	2022–23	Southern League Premier Division Central	6	0	—		—		0	0	6	0
Redditch United (loan)	2022–23	Southern League Premier Division Central	9	0	—		—		1 (Note: Appearance(s) in Worcestershire Senior Cup)	0	10	0
Hereford (loan)	2023–24	National League North	7	0	0	0	—		—		7	0
Long Eaton United (loan)	2023–24	Southern Football League Premier Division Central	10	1	—		—		1	1	11	2
Stratford Town (loan)	2023–24	Southern Football League Premier Division Central	5	0	—		—		—		5	0
Long Eaton United (loan)	2023–24	Southern Football League Premier Division Central	6	1	—		—		—		6	1
Poole Town	2024–25	Southern League Premier Division South	0	0	0	0	—		0	0	0	0
Career total			76	8	0	0	0	0	4	1	80	9
