= 2019–20 Burton Albion F.C. season =

Burton Albion
2019–20 season
- Chairman: Ben Robinson
- Manager: Nigel Clough (until 18 May 2020); Jake Buxton (from 18 May 2020)
- Stadium: Pirelli Stadium
- League One: 12th
- FA Cup: Third round
- EFL Cup: Fourth round
- EFL Trophy: Group stage
- Top goalscorer: League: Liam Boyce (8); All: Liam Boyce (14)
- Biggest win: 4–0 (one match)
- Biggest defeat: 1–4 (two matches)
Home colours	Away colours

The 2019–20 season was Burton Albion's 70th season in their history and their third in League One. Along with competing in the League One, the club also participated in the FA Cup, League Cup and League Trophy. The season ran from 1 July 2019 to 30 June 2020.

== Squad ==
No.	Name	Pos.	Nationality	Place of birth	Age	Apps	Goals	Signed from	Date signed	Fee	End
Goalkeepers
1	Kieran O'Hara	GK	(Republic of Ireland) (England)	Manchester	24	42	0	Manchester United	8 July 2019	Loan	2020
13	Stephen Bywater	GK	(England)	Oldham	39	61	0	Kerala Blasters	16 January 2016	Free	2020
20	Callum Hawkins	GK	(England)		20	0	0	Academy	9 May 2018	Trainee	2020
24	Ben Garratt	GK	(England)	Market Drayton	26	4	0	Crewe Alexandra	18 October 2019	Free	2020
Defenders
2	John Brayford	RB/CB	(England)	Stoke-on-Trent	32	234	13	Sheffield United	31 August 2017	Free	2020
3	Colin Daniel	LB/LM	(England)	Eastwood	32	49	0	Peterborough United	21 January 2019	Undisclosed	2020
5	Jake Buxton	RB/CB	(England)	Sutton-in-Ashfield	35	140	1	Wigan Athletic	1 July 2017	Free	2020
6	Kieran Wallace	LB/LM	(England)	Nottingham	25	61	2	Free agent	30 October 2018	Free	2020
15	Reece Hutchinson	LB	(England)		19	54	0	Academy	9 May 2018	Trainee	2021
16	Conor Shaughnessy	CB	(Republic of Ireland)	Galway	24	8	0	Leeds United	13 January 2020	Loan	2020
18	Richard Nartey	CB	(England)		21	29	0	Chelsea	1 July 2019	Loan	2020
19	Jevan Anderson	CB	(Scotland)	Aberdeen	20	3	0	Formartine United	1 July 2019	Free	2020
26	Ben Hart	DF	(England)		19	0	0	Academy	1 July 2019	Trainee	2020
	Nathan Morley	LB	(England)		19	0	0	Academy	1 July 2019	Trainee	2020
Midfielders
4	Ryan Edwards	AM	(Australia)	Singapore	26	44	7	Heart of Midlothian	23 July 2019	2021	
7	Stephen Quinn	CM	(Republic of Ireland)	Dublin	34	86	2	Reading	22 August 2018	Free	2020
8	Scott Fraser	AM	(Scotland)	Dundee	25	90	16	Dundee United	5 July 2018	Free	2020
12	Ben Fox	CM	(England)	Burton upon Trent	22	41	2	Academy	1 July 2016	Trainee	2021
14	Joe Sbarra	CM	(England)	Lichfield	21	67	1	Academy	1 July 2017	Trainee	2020
21	John-Joe O'Toole	CM	(Republic of Ireland) (England)	Harrow	31	36	0	Northampton Town	1 July 2019	Free	2021
23	Joe Powell	AM	(England)	Canning Town	21	10	3	West Ham United	14 January 2020	Undisclosed	2022
	Ethan Vale	CM	(England)		19	0	0	Academy	1 July 2019	Trainee	2020
Forwards
9	Nathan Broadhead	LW/CF	(Wales)	Bangor	22	22	3	Everton	2 August 2019	Loan	2020
10	Lucas Akins	CF/LWB	(England)	Huddersfield	31	273	58	Stevenage	1 July 2014	Free	2021
17	Oliver Sarkic	CF/AM	(Montenegro) (England)	Grimsby	22	36	5	Leeds United	1 August 2019	Free	2020
27	Kwame Thomas	Centre forward	(England)	Nottingham	24	2	0	Doncaster Rovers	4 February 2020	Free	2020
29	Jamie Murphy	LW	(Scotland)	Glasgow	30	10	7	Rangers	20 January 2020	Loan	2020

=== Statistics ===
As of 20 March 2020

No.	Pos	Nat	Player	Total		League One		FA Cup		League Cup		League Trophy	
No.	Pos	Nat	Player	Apps	Goals	Apps	Goals	Apps	Goals	Apps	Goals	Apps	Goals
1	GK	(Republic of Ireland) IRL	Kieran O'Hara	42	0	33+0	0	4+0	0	4+0	0	1+0	0
2	DF	(England) ENG	John Brayford	40	3	29+3	2	3+0	1	3+0	0	1+1	0
3	DF	(England) ENG	Colin Daniel	31	0	19+5	0	2+1	0	1+1	0	2+0	0
4	MF	(Australia) AUS	Ryan Edwards	43	7	32+0	5	4+0	1	4+0	1	3+0	0
5	DF	(England) ENG	Jake Buxton	30	1	20+4	1	4+0	0	0+1	0	1+0	0
6	DF	(England) ENG	Kieran Wallace	36	1	20+6	1	2+1	0	4+0	0	3+0	0
7	MF	(Republic of Ireland) IRL	Stephen Quinn	37	1	26+2	0	4+0	0	3+0	0	2+0	1
8	MF	(Scotland) SCO	Scott Fraser	41	9	25+5	5	3+1	2	4+0	1	2+1	1
9	FW	(Wales) WAL	Nathan Broadhead	23	3	13+7	2	1+0	0	2+0	1	0+0	0
10	FW	(England) ENG	Lucas Akins	46	11	35+0	9	4+0	1	3+0	0	4+0	1
13	GK	(England) ENG	Stephen Bywater	1	0	0+0	0	0+0	0	0+0	0	1+0	0
14	MF	(England) ENG	Joe Sbarra	33	1	6+16	1	1+3	0	0+4	0	3+0	0
15	DF	(England) ENG	Reece Hutchinson	23	0	8+9	0	0+1	0	3+0	0	2+0	0
16	DF	(Republic of Ireland) IRL	Conor Shaughnessy	8	0	6+2	0	0+0	0	0+0	0	0+0	0
17	FW	(Montenegro) MNE	Oliver Šarkić	36	5	24+4	3	1+1	1	4+0	1	0+2	0
18	DF	(England) ENG	Richard Nartey	29	0	20+5	0	1+0	0	1+1	0	0+1	0
19	DF	(Scotland) SCO	Jevan Anderson	3	0	0+1	0	0+0	0	0+0	0	0+2	0
21	MF	(Republic of Ireland) IRL	John-Joe O'Toole	36	0	25+0	0	3+1	0	4+0	0	3+0	0
22	FW	(England) ENG	Chris Beardsley	1	0	0+0	0	0+0	0	0+0	0	0+1	0
23	MF	(England) ENG	Joe Powell	10	3	7+3	3	0+0	0	0+0	0	0+0	0
24	GK	(England) ENG	Ben Garratt	4	0	2+1	0	0+0	0	0+0	0	1+0	0
26	DF	(England) ENG	Ben Hart	3	0	0+3	0	0+0	0	0+0	0	0+0	0
27	FW	(England) ENG	Kwame Thomas	2	0	0+2	0	0+0	0	0+0	0	0+0	0
29	FW	(Scotland) SCO	Jamie Murphy	10	7	10+0	7	0+0	0	0+0	0	0+0	0
Players who left the club:
11	MF	(Scotland) SCO	David Templeton	27	5	7+11	3	4+0	1	0+2	0	3+0	1
23	MF	(England) ENG	Lloyd Dyer	9	0	0+5	0	0+1	0	0+2	0	1+0	0
27	FW	(Northern Ireland) NIR	Liam Boyce	33	14	17+8	8	3+0	1	4+0	5	1+0	0

==== Goals record ====
As of 20 March 2020

Rank	No.	Nat.	Po.	Name	League One	FA Cup	League Cup	League Trophy	Total
1	27	(Northern Ireland)	CF	Liam Boyce	8	1	5	0	14
2	10	(England)	CF	Lucas Akins	9	1	0	1	11
3	8	(Scotland)	AM	Scott Fraser	5	2	1	1	9
4	4	(Australia)	AM	Ryan Edwards	5	1	1	0	7
4	29	(Scotland)	LW	Jamie Murphy	7	0	0	0	7
6	11	(Scotland)	RW	David Templeton	3	1	0	1	5
6	17	(Montenegro)	CF	Oliver Šarkić	3	1	1	0	5
8	2	(England)	RB	John Brayford	2	1	0	0	3
8	9	(Wales)	LW	Nathan Broadhead	2	0	1	0	3
8	23	(England)	AM	Joe Powell	3	0	0	0	3
11	5	(England)	CB	Jake Buxton	1	0	0	0	1
11	6	(England)	LB	Kieran Wallace	1	0	0	0	1
11	7	(Republic of Ireland)	CM	Stephen Quinn	0	0	0	1	1
11	14	(England)	CM	Joe Sbarra	1	0	0	0	1
Total					49	8	9	4	71

==== Disciplinary record ====
As of 20 March 2020

Rank	No.	Nat.	Po.	Name	League One			FA Cup			League Cup			League Trophy			Total		
Rank	No.	Nat.	Po.	Name	Yellow card	(yellow card) (yellow-red card)	Red card	Yellow card	(yellow card) (yellow-red card)	Red card	Yellow card	(yellow card) (yellow-red card)	Red card	Yellow card	(yellow card) (yellow-red card)	Red card	Yellow card	(yellow card) (yellow-red card)	Red card
1	21	(Republic of Ireland)	CM	John-Joe O'Toole	9	1	1	0	0	0	0	0	0	0	0	0	9	1	1
2	7	(Republic of Ireland)	CM	Stephen Quinn	8	1	0	0	0	0	0	0	0	1	0	0	9	1	0
3	4	(Australia)	AM	Ryan Edwards	6	0	0	0	0	0	1	0	0	0	0	0	7	0	0
4	5	(England)	CB	Jake Buxton	4	0	0	0	0	0	0	0	0	1	0	0	5	0	0
5	6	(England)	LB	Kieran Wallace	3	0	0	0	0	0	0	0	0	1	0	0	4	0	0
5	10	(England)	LW	Lucas Akins	2	0	0	0	0	0	2	0	0	0	0	0	4	0	0
5	17	(Montenegro)	CF	Oliver Šarkić	2	1	0	0	0	0	0	0	0	0	0	0	2	1	0
5	18	(England)	CB	Richard Nartey	3	0	0	0	0	0	1	0	0	0	0	0	4	0	0
10	1	(Republic of Ireland)	GK	Kieran O'Hara	2	0	0	1	0	0	0	0	0	0	0	0	3	0	0
10	2	(England)	RB	John Brayford	1	0	0	1	0	0	0	0	0	1	0	0	3	0	0
10	3	(England)	LB	Colin Daniel	1	0	0	0	0	0	2	0	0	0	0	0	3	0	0
10	8	(Scotland)	AM	Scott Fraser	2	0	0	0	0	0	0	0	0	1	0	0	3	0	0
10	27	(Northern Ireland)	CF	Liam Boyce	3	0	0	0	0	0	0	0	0	0	0	0	3	0	0
15	9	(Wales)	LW	Nathan Broadhead	1	0	0	1	0	0	0	0	0	0	0	0	2	0	0
15	14	(England)	CM	Joe Sbarra	1	0	0	1	0	0	0	0	0	0	0	0	2	0	0
17	15	(England)	LB	Reece Hutchinson	1	0	0	0	0	0	0	0	0	0	0	0	1	0	0
17	19	(England)	CB	Jevan Anderson	0	0	0	0	0	0	0	0	0	1	0	0	1	0	0
17	23	(England)	AM	Joe Powell	1	0	0	0	0	0	0	0	0	0	0	0	1	0	0
Total					51	3	1	4	0	0	6	0	0	6	0	0	67	3	1

== Transfers ==
=== Transfers in ===
Date	Position	Nationality	Name	From	Fee	Ref.
1 July 2019	CB	(Scotland)	Jevan Anderson	(Scotland) Formartine United	Free transfer	
1 July 2019	CM	(Republic of Ireland)	John-Joe O'Toole	(England) Northampton Town	Free transfer	
23 July 2019	AM	(Australia)	Ryan Edwards	(Scotland) Heart of Midlothian	Undisclosed	
1 August 2019	CF	(Montenegro)	Oliver Šarkić	(England) Leeds United	Free transfer	
24 September 2019	LW	(England)	Lloyd Dyer	Free agent	Free transfer	
18 October 2019	GK	(England)	Ben Garratt	(England) Crewe Alexandra	Free transfer	
14 January 2020	AM	(England)	Joe Powell	(England) West Ham United	Undisclosed	
4 February 2020	CF	(England)	Kwame Thomas	(England) Doncaster Rovers	Free transfer	

=== Loans in ===
Date from	Position	Nationality	Name	From	Date until	Ref.
1 July 2019	CB	(England)	Richard Nartey	(England) Chelsea	30 June 2020	
8 July 2019	GK	(Republic of Ireland)	Kieran O'Hara	(England) Manchester United	30 June 2020	
2 August 2019	LW	(Wales)	Nathan Broadhead	(England) Everton	30 June 2020	
13 January 2020	CB	(Republic of Ireland)	Conor Shaughnessy	(England) Leeds United	30 June 2020	
20 January 2020	LW	(Scotland)	Jamie Murphy	(Scotland) Rangers	30 June 2020	

=== Loans out ===
Date from	Position	Nationality	Name	From	Date until	Ref.
13 September 2019	MF	(England)	Ethan Vale	(England) Grantham Town	14 October 2019	
16 September 2019	LB	(England)	Nathan Morley	(England) Newcastle Town	26 December 2019	
20 September 2019	RB	(England)	Ben Hart	(England) Kidsgrove Athletic	October 2019	
19 December 2019	MF	(England)	Ethan Vale	(England) Newcastle Town	30 June 2020	
17 January 2020	RB	(England)	Ben Hart	(England) Kidsgrove Athletic	April 2020	
17 January 2020	FW	(England)	Jack Holmes	(England) Halesowen Town	Work experience	
31 January 2020	CB	(Scotland)	Jevan Anderson	(England) Hereford	29 February 2020	
14 February 2020	RB	(England)	Ben Hart	(England) Tamworth	March 2020	

=== Transfers out ===
Date	Position	Nationality	Name	To	Fee	Ref.
1 July 2019	CM	(England)	Jamie Allen	(England) Coventry City	Undisclosed	
1 July 2019	GK	(England)	Harry Campbell	Free agent	Released	
1 July 2019	LB	(Republic of Ireland)	Damien McCrory	(England) Notts County	Released	
1 July 2019	CB	(England)	Kyle McFadzean	(England) Coventry City	Released	
1 July 2019	AM	(England)	William Miller	Free agent	Released	
18 July 2019	RW	(England)	Marcus Harness	(England) Portsmouth	Undisclosed	
26 July 2019	ST	(England)	Marvin Sordell	Retired	—N/a	
25 January 2020	CF	(Northern Ireland)	Liam Boyce	(Scotland) Heart of Midlothian	Undisclosed	
31 January 2020	RW	(Scotland)	David Templeton	(Scotland) Hamilton Academical	Free transfer	

== Pre-season ==
The Brewers confirmed their pre-season schedule in June 2019.

13 July 2019 Friendly	Matlock Town	1–1	Burton Albion	Matlock
15:00 BST	Marshall 24'	Report	Boyce 53'	Stadium: Causeway Lane; Referee: Richard Eley

16 July 2019 Friendly	Burton Albion	2–1	Sheffield United	Burton-upon-Trent
19:45 BST	Brayford 40'; Harness 90+1'	Report	Sharp 16'	Stadium: Pirelli Stadium

20 July 2019 Friendly	Burton Albion	2–5	Derby County	Burton-upon-Trent
15:00 BST	Brayford 22'; Fraser 51'	Report	Waghorn 16', 26', 36'; Bennett 47'; Bird 90'	Stadium: Pirelli Stadium

23 July 2019 Friendly	Solihull Moors	0–0	Burton Albion	Solihull
19:30 BST		Report		Stadium: Automated Technology Group Stadium

24 July 2019 Friendly	Mickleover Sports	2–0	Burton Albion	Mickleover
19:45 BST	Modeste 2'; Smith 42'	Report		Stadium: Station Road

27 July 2019 Friendly	Chesterfield	2–5	Burton Albion	Chesterfield
15:00 BST	Spyrou 2'; Evans 60'	Report	Fraser 12'; Boyce 29', 30'; Edwards 34'; Buxton (yellow card) 63'; Akins 90+2'	Stadium: Proact Stadium; Attendance: 1,092

29 July 2019 Friendly	Nuneaton Borough	4–4	Burton Albion	Nuneaton
19:30 BST	Clifton 35'; Edmunds 45', 53'; Benbow 84'	Report	Sbarra 20'; Hewlett 26', 56'; Lowe 81' (o.g.)	Stadium: Coombe Abbey Arena; Attendance: 329

== Competitions ==
=== EFL League One ===
==== League table ====
Pos	Team	Pld	W	D	L	GF	GA	GD	Pts	PPG
8	Sunderland	36	16	11	9	48	32	+16	59	1.64
9	Doncaster Rovers	34	15	9	10	51	33	+18	54	1.59
10	Gillingham	35	12	15	8	42	34	+8	51	1.46
11	Ipswich Town	36	14	10	12	46	36	+10	52	1.44
12	Burton Albion	35	12	12	11	50	50	0	48	1.37
13	Blackpool	35	11	12	12	44	43	+1	45	1.29
14	Bristol Rovers	35	12	9	14	38	49	−11	45	1.29
15	Shrewsbury Town	34	10	11	13	31	42	−11	41	1.21
16	Lincoln City	35	12	6	17	44	46	−2	42	1.20

Source: EFL Official Website
Rules for classification: 1) Points per game; 2) Goal difference; 3) Number of goals scored; 4) Head-to-head results; 5) Wins; 6) Away goals; 7) Penalty points (sec 9.5); 8) 12-point sending-off offences

==== Results summary ====
Overall								Home						Away					
Pld	W	D	L	GF	GA	GD	Pts	W	D	L	GF	GA	GD	W	D	L	GF	GA	GD
35	12	12	11	50	50	0	48	6	8	3	19	14	+5	6	4	8	31	36	−5

Last updated: 10 March 2020.

==== Results by matchday ====
Matchday	1	2	3	4	5	6	7	8	9	10	11	12	13	14	15	16	17	18	19	20	21	22	23	24	25	26	27	28	29	30	31	32	33	34	35
Ground	H	A	H	A	A	H	H	A	A	A	A	H	H	A	A	A	H	H	A	H	H	A	A	H	H	H	A	A	H	H	A	A	H	A	H
Result	L	W	L	W	D	W	D	D	L	W	L	W	D	D	L	W	D	L	L	W	W	L	W	W	W	D	D	L	D	D	L	W	D	L	D
Position	17	11	16	9	11	8	11	9	14	14	15	13	13	13	15	14	12	15	16	14	12	14	12	11	6	9	10	11	11	12	12	12	12	12	12

Updated to match(es) played on 10 March 2020. Source: Statto.com
A = Away; H = Home; W = Win; D = Draw; L = Loss

==== Matches ====
On Thursday, 20 June 2019, the EFL League One fixtures were revealed.

3 August 2019 1	Burton Albion	0–1	Ipswich Town	Burton upon Trent
15:00 BST	Quinn (yellow card) 27' (yellow-red card) 78'; Edwards (yellow card) 36'; Fraser (yellow card) 90+2'	Report	Garbutt 11'; Norwood (yellow card) 53'; Downes (yellow card) 58'; Judge (yellow card) 88'	Stadium: Pirelli Stadium; Attendance: 4,565; Referee: Ross Joyce

10 August 2019 2	Gillingham	1–2	Burton Albion	Gillingham
15:00 BST	Cisse 7'	Report	O'Toole (yellow card) 10'; Broadhead 42', 45'; Brayford (yellow card) 90+1'	Stadium: Priestfield Stadium; Attendance: 4,682; Referee: James Lingington

17 August 2019 3	Burton Albion	0–1	Rotherham United	Burton upon Trent
15:00 BST		Report	O'Hara 24' (o.g.); Robertson (yellow card) 84'	Stadium: Pirelli Stadium; Attendance: 3,822; Referee: Nick Kinseley

20 August 2019 4	Oxford United	2–4	Burton Albion	Oxford
19:45 BST	Brannagan 47'; Forde 56'; Rodriguez (yellow card) 74'	Report	Buxton 30'; Edwards (yellow card) 34'; Broadhead (yellow card) 42'; Fraser 61', 70', 84'	Stadium: The Kassam Stadium; Attendance: 6,111; Referee: Brett Huxtable

24 August 2019 5	Shrewsbury Town	0–0	Burton Albion	Shrewsbury
15:00 BST	Okenabirhie (yellow card) 73'	Report	O'Toole (yellow card) 55'	Stadium: New Meadow; Attendance: 5,553; Referee: Lee Swabey

31 August 2019 6	Burton Albion	2–0	Bristol Rovers	Burton upon Trent
15:00 BST	Edwards (yellow card) 33' (goal) 90+5'; Akins 87'	Report	Craig (yellow card) 10'; Clarke (yellow card) 60'; Davies (yellow card) 81'	Stadium: Pirelli Stadium; Attendance: 2,831; Referee: Peter Wright

7 September 2019	Sunderland	v	Burton Albion	Sunderland
15:00 BST		Report		Stadium: Stadium of Light
Note: The match was postponed on 28 August 2019, due to international call-ups.

14 September 2019 7	Burton Albion	0–0	Coventry City	Burton upon Trent
15:00 BST	O'Toole (yellow card) 62'; Nartey (yellow card) 89'	Report	Walsh (yellow card) 57'; McFadzean (yellow card) 80'	Stadium: Pirelli Stadium; Attendance: 4,409; Referee: Oliver Langford

17 September 2019 8	Portsmouth	2–2	Burton Albion	Milton
19:45 BST	Curtis 39'; Downing (yellow card) 90'; Pitman 90+5' (pen.)	Report	Sbarra 3'; Wallace 6'; O'Toole (yellow card) 21' (yellow-red card) 25'; Quinn (yellow card) 90'	Stadium: Fratton Park; Attendance: 16,610; Referee: Craig Hicks

21 September 2019 9	Tranmere Rovers	2–1	Burton Albion	Birkenhead
15:00 BST	Banks (yellow card) 60' (goal) 90+2'; Borthwick-Jackson (yellow card) 66'; Payne 90+5'	Report	Wallace (yellow card) 16'; Akins 66' (pen.); O'Hara (yellow card) 78'; Hutchinson (yellow card) 86'	Stadium: Prenton Park; Referee: Alan Young

5 October 2019 10	Milton Keynes Dons	0–3	Burton Albion	Denbigh
15:00 BST		Report	Boyce 32', 90+1'; Sarkic 54'	Stadium: Stadium MK; Attendance: 9,111; Referee: Oliver Yates

12 October 2019	Burton Albion	v	Bolton Wanderers	Burton upon Trent
15:00 BST				Stadium: Pirelli Stadium
Note: The match was postponed on 1 October 2019, due to international call-ups.

19 October 2019 11	Fleetwood Town	4–1	Burton Albion	Fleetwood
15:00 BST	Evans 38'; Madden 58', 68', 90'; Coutts (yellow card) 86'	Report	Wallace (yellow card) 5'; Sarkic 45'; Boyce (yellow card) 90+1'	Stadium: Highbury Stadium; Attendance: 3,098; Referee: Christopher Sarginson

22 October 2019 12	Burton Albion	1–0	AFC Wimbledon	Burton upon Trent
19:45 BST	Templeton 31'; O'Toole (yellow card) 57'	Report	Kalambayi (yellow card) 22'	Stadium: Pirelli Stadium; Attendance: 2,223; Referee: Darren Handley

26 October 2019 13	Burton Albion	0–0	Blackpool	Burton upon Trent
15:00 BST		Report	Tilt (yellow card) 3' (yellow-red card) 57'	Stadium: Pirelli Stadium; Attendance: 3,012; Referee: Carl Boyeson

2 November 2019 14	Doncaster Rovers	2–2	Burton Albion	Doncaster
15:00 BST	Taylor 39'; Sadlier 57'; Ben Whiteman (yellow card) 74'	Report	Templeton 36'; Akins 53' (pen.); Quinn (yellow card) 90+5'	Stadium: Keepmoat Stadium; Attendance: 7,492; Referee: Neil Hair

16 November 2019	Burton Albion	v	Southend United	Burton upon Trent
15:00 GMT		Report		Stadium: Pirelli Stadium
Note: On 5 November, the match was postponed due to international call-ups.

23 November 2019 15	Peterborough United	1–0	Burton Albion	Peterborough
15:00 GMT	Ward (yellow card) 64' (goal) 90+1'	Report	Edwards (yellow card) 53'; O'Hara (yellow card) 84'	Stadium: Weston Homes Stadium; Attendance: 6,462; Referee: Will Finnie

26 November 2019 16	Sunderland	1–2	Burton Albion	Sunderland
19:45 GMT	McGeady 19' (pen.); Power (yellow card) 29'	Report	Edwards 20'; Quinn (yellow card) 50'; Sarkic (yellow card) 56'; Boyce 68'; Daniel (yellow card) 86'	Stadium: Stadium of Light; Referee: Robert Lewis

3 December 2019 17	Burton Albion	1–1	Southend United	Burton upon Trent
19:45 GMT	O'Toole (red card) 33'; Fraser 49'; Buxton (yellow card) 81'	Report	McLaughlin 21' (yellow card) 52'; Demetriou (yellow card) 35'; Dieng (yellow card) 48'	Stadium: Pirelli Stadium; Attendance: 1,880; Referee: Darren Drysdale

7 December 2019 18	Burton Albion	0–2	Lincoln City	Burton upon Trent
15:00 GMT	Edwards (yellow card) 26'; Wallace (yellow card) 61'; Quinn (yellow card) 90+2'	Report	Anderson 2'; Hesketh (yellow card) 13'; Eardley (yellow card) 63'; Bolger (yellow card) 84'; Walker 90+3'	Stadium: Pirelli Stadium; Attendance: 3,782; Referee: Ben Toner

14 December 2019 19	Wycombe Wanderers	2–0	Burton Albion	High Wycombe
15:00 GMT	Wheeler 24'; Thompson (yellow card) 44'; Jombati (yellow card) 45+3'; Bloomfield 90'	Report	Quinn (yellow card) 44'; Buxton (yellow card) 78'	Stadium: Adams Park; Attendance: 5,448; Referee: Neil Hair

21 December 2019 20	Burton Albion	3–1	Rochdale	Burton upon Trent
15:00 GMT	Edwards 11'; Akins 18' (pen.); Boyce 82'	Report	Camps 2'	Stadium: Pirelli Stadium; Attendance: 2,298; Referee: Graham Salisbury

26 December 2019 21	Burton Albion	4–2	Tranmere Rovers	Burton upon Trent
15:00 GMT	Fraser 12'; Buxton (yellow card) 30'; Quinn (yellow card) 41'; Akins 50'; Boyce 60', 86'	Report	Ferrier 26'; Morris (yellow card) 45+2' (goal) 64'; Danns (yellow card) 90+4'	Stadium: Pirelli Stadium; Attendance: 3,970; Referee: Oliver Yates

29 December 2019 22	Accrington Stanley	2–0	Burton Albion	Accrington
15:00 GMT	McConville 39'; Opoku (yellow card) 50'; Sykes 65'; Finley (yellow card) 71'	Report	Nartey (yellow card) 62'; Akins (yellow card) 90+1'	Stadium: Wham Stadium; Attendance: 2,449; Referee: Christopher Sarginson

1 January 2020 23	Bolton Wanderers	3–4	Burton Albion	Horwich
15:00 GMT	Dodoo 5'; D. Murphy 11'; L. Murphy (yellow card) 29' (yellow-red card) 49'; Buckley (yellow card) 75'; Politic 84'	Report	Templeton 13'; Akins 26', 45+1'; Fraser (yellow card) 70'; Boyce 81'	Stadium: University of Bolton Stadium; Referee: Scott Oldham

4 January 2020	Burton Albion	v	Milton Keynes Dons	Burton upon Trent
15:00 GMT		Report		Stadium: Pirelli Stadium
Note: The match was postponed on 2 December due to the clubs progression in the FA Cup.

11 January 2020 24	Burton Albion	1–0	Fleetwood Town	Burton upon Trent
15:00 GMT	Edwards 89'	Report	Connolly (yellow card) 17'; Souttar (yellow card) 59'; Evans (yellow card) 61'	Stadium: Pirelli Stadium; Attendance: 2,354; Referee: Josh Smith

14 January 2020 25	Burton Albion	1–0	Milton Keynes Dons	Burton upon Trent
19:45 GMT	Boyce 20' (yellow card) 57'	Report	Walsh (yellow card) 55'; Gilbey (yellow card) 77'	Stadium: Pirelli Stadium; Attendance: 2,005; Referee: Martin Coy

25 January 2020 26	Burton Albion	1–1	Accrington Stanley	Burton upon Trent
15:00 GMT	Brayford 30'; O'Toole (yellow card) 36'; Edwards (yellow card) 45+2'; Quinn (yellow card) 59'	Report	Charles 15' (yellow card) 45+4'; Opoku (yellow card) 22'; Hughes (yellow card) 45+2'	Stadium: Pirelli Stadium; Attendance: 2,759; Referee: Kevin Johnson

28 January 2020 27	AFC Wimbledon	2–2	Burton Albion	Norbiton
19:45 GMT	Pinnock 16'; Hartigan (yellow card) 56'; Reilly 60'; Rudoni (yellow card) 69'	Report	Powell 7'; Quinn (yellow card) 28'; Murphy 41'	Stadium: The Cherry Red Records Stadium; Attendance: 3,674; Referee: John Busby

1 February 2020 28	Rotherham United	3–2	Burton Albion	Rotherham
15:00 GMT	Smith 9', 46'; Ladapo 71' (yellow card) 90+2'	Report	Murphy 7'; Sarkic (yellow card) 32' (goal) 47'	Stadium: AESSEAL New York Stadium; Attendance: 8,563; Referee: James Adcock

8 February 2020 29	Burton Albion	0–0	Gillingham	Burton upon Trent
15:00 GMT	Sarkic (yellow card) 42' (yellow-red card) 67'; O'Toole (yellow card) 76'; Nartey (yellow card) 90+2'	Report	Fuller (yellow card) 21'; Roberts (yellow card) 88'	Stadium: Pirelli Stadium; Attendance: 2,750; Referee: Alan Young

11 February 2020 30	Burton Albion	2–2	Oxford United	Burton upon Trent
19:45 GMT	Akins 21'; Murphy 71'; Powell (yellow card) 89'	Report	Rodriguez (yellow card) 41'; Taylor (yellow card) 45+1' (goal) 90+1'; Agyei 63'; Dickie (yellow card) 89'	Stadium: Pirelli Stadium; Attendance: 2,278; Referee: Steve Martin

15 February 2020 31	Ipswich Town	4–1	Burton Albion	Ipswich
15:00 GMT	Garbutt (yellow card) 23'; Judge 29', 63'; Jackson 45+1', 52'; Nolan (yellow card) 67'	Report	Murphy 6'	Stadium: Portman Road; Attendance: 19,922; Referee: Charles Breakspear

22 February 2020 32	Southend United	2–3	Burton Albion	Southend-on-Sea
15:00 GMT	Mantom 29'; O'Toole 90+1' (o.g.)	Report	Akins 5' (yellow card) 90+3'; Edwards 49'; O'Toole (yellow card) 54'; Murphy 74'	Stadium: Roots Hall; Attendance: 5,571; Referee: Craig Hicks

29 February 2020 33	Burton Albion	1–1	Peterborough United	Burton upon Trent
15:00 GMT	O'Toole (yellow card) 29'; Brayford 65'	Report	Eisa 52'; Dembélé (yellow card) 61'; Thompson (yellow card) 70'	Stadium: Pirelli Stadium; Attendance: 3,795; Referee: Brett Huxtable

7 March 2020 34	Lincoln City	3–2	Burton Albion	Lincoln
15:00 GMT	Hopper 21', 38'; Bostwick (yellow card) 61'; Morrell 62'	Report	Powell 6', 30'; O'Toole (yellow card) 61'; Buxton (yellow card) 75'; Akins (penalty missed) 80'	Stadium: Sincil Bank; Attendance: 8,474; Referee: Scott Oldham

10 March 2020 35	Burton Albion	2–2	Bolton Wanderers	Burton upon Trent
19:45 GMT	Murphy 28', 65'; Sbarra (yellow card) 90'	Report	Delaney 20'; Nsiala (yellow card) 34'; Hamilton 38'	Stadium: Pirelli Stadium; Attendance: 2,034; Referee: Thomas Bramall

14 March 2020	Burton Albion	v	Wycombe Wanderers	Burton upon Trent
15:00 GMT				Stadium: Pirelli Stadium
Note: Season was suspended until 3 April 2020, due to the COVID-19 pandemic.

21 March 2020	Rochdale	v	Burton Albion	Spotland
15:00 GMT				Stadium: Crown Oil Arena
Note: Season was suspended until 3 April 2020, due to the COVID-19 pandemic.

28 March 2020	Burton Albion	v	Doncaster Rovers	Burton upon Trent
15:00 GMT				Stadium: Pirelli Stadium
Note: Season was suspended until 3 April 2020, due to the COVID-19 pandemic.

4 April 2020	Blackpool	v	Burton Albion	Blackpool
15:00 GMT				Stadium: Bloomfield Road
Note: On 3 April, the English Football League decided to postpone all football until safe to do so due to the COVID-19 pandemic.

10 April 2020	Burton Albion	v	Shrewsbury Town	Burton upon Trent
15:00 BST				Stadium: Pirelli Stadium
Note: On 3 April, the English Football League decided to postpone all football until safe to do so due to the COVID-19 pandemic.

13 April 2020	Bristol Rovers	v	Burton Albion	Horfield
13:00 BST				Stadium: Memorial Stadium
Note: On 3 April, the English Football League decided to postpone all football until safe to do so due to the COVID-19 pandemic.

18 April 2020	Burton Albion	v	Sunderland	Burton upon Trent
15:00 BST				Stadium: Pirelli Stadium
Note: On 3 April, the English Football League decided to postpone all football until safe to do so due to the COVID-19 pandemic.

25 April 2020	Coventry City	v	Burton Albion	Bordesley
15:00 BST				Stadium: St Andrew's Trillion Trophy Stadium
Note: On 3 April, the English Football League decided to postpone all football until safe to do so due to the COVID-19 pandemic.

3 May 2020	Burton Albion	v	Portsmouth	Burton upon Trent
15:00 BST				Stadium: Pirelli Stadium
Note: On 3 April, the English Football League decided to postpone all football until safe to do so due to the COVID-19 pandemic.

=== FA Cup ===
The first round draw was made on 21 October 2019. The second round draw was made live on 11 November from Chichester City's stadium, Oaklands Park. The third round draw was made live on BBC Two from Etihad Stadium, Micah Richards and Tony Adams conducted the draw.

9 November 2019 First round	Salford City	1–1	Burton Albion	Salford
15:00 GMT	Jones (yellow card) 24'; Towell 83'	Report	Fraser 78'; Broadhead (yellow card) 86'	Stadium: The Peninsula Stadium; Attendance: 2,724; Referee: Alan Young

19 November 2019 First round replay	Burton Albion	4–1	Salford City	Burton upon Trent
19:45 GMT	Akins 42'; Brayford (yellow card) 62' (goal) 70'; Templeton 64'; Sarkic 81'	Report	Touray 52'	Stadium: Pirelli Stadium; Attendance: 1,479; Referee: Marc Edwards

30 November 2019 Second round	Oldham Athletic	0–1	Burton Albion	Oldham
15:00 GMT	Iacovitti (yellow card) 31'; Maouche (yellow card) 84'; Akpa Akpro (yellow card) 90+2'	Report	Sbarra (yellow card) 15'; Boyce 23'; O'Hara (yellow card) 81'	Stadium: Boundary Park; Referee: Andy Davies

5 January 2020 Third round	Burton Albion	2–4	Northampton Town	Burton upon Trent
14:01 GMT	Edwards 45+2'; Fraser 90+1'	Report	Adams 10'; Watson 23'; Lines (yellow card) 44'; Goode 45+1'; Wharton (yellow card) 58'; Turnbull (yellow card) 62'; Hoskins 70'	Stadium: Pirelli Stadium; Attendance: 3,810; Referee: Jeremy Simpson

=== EFL Cup ===
The first round draw was made on 20 June. The second round draw was made on 13 August 2019 following the conclusion of all but one first-round matches. The third round draw was confirmed on 28 August 2019, live on Sky Sports. The draw for the fourth round was made on 25 September 2019.

13 August 2019 First round	Port Vale	1–2	Burton Albion	Burslem
19:45 BST	Gibbons (yellow card) 43'; Cullen 53' (pen.); Bennett (yellow card) 83'; Amoo (yellow card) 90+2'	Report	Boyce 9'; Fraser 62'; Akins (yellow card) 79'; Daniel (yellow card) 90+1'	Stadium: Vale Park; Attendance: 2,252; Referee: Paul Marsden

27 August 2019 Second round	Burton Albion	4–0	Morecambe	Burton upon Trent
19:45 BST	Daniel (yellow card) 19'; Boyce 34', 45+2', 74'; Edwards 51'	Report	Brewitt (yellow card) 58'	Stadium: Pirelli Stadium; Attendance: 1,500; Referee: Sebastian Stockbridge

25 September 2019 Third round	Burton Albion	2–0	Bournemouth	Burton upon Trent
19:45 BST	Sarkic 14'; Nartey (yellow card) 38'; Edwards (yellow card) 53'; Akins (yellow card) 70'; Broadhead 72'	Report	Simpson (yellow card) 50'; Ibe (yellow card) 87'	Stadium: Pirelli Stadium; Attendance: 2,505; Referee: John Busby

29 October 2019 Fourth round	Burton Albion	1–3	Leicester City	Burton upon Trent
19:45 GMT	Boyce 52'	Report	Iheanacho 7'; Tielemans 20'; Maddison 89'	Stadium: Pirelli Stadium; Attendance: 6,186; Referee: Darren England

=== EFL Trophy ===
On 9 July 2019, the pre-determined group stage draw was announced with Invited clubs to be drawn on 12 July 2019.

Pos	Div	Team	Pld	W	PW	PL	L	GF	GA	GD	Pts	Qualification
1	ACA	Everton U21	3	1	1	1	0	5	3	+2	6	Advance to Round 2
2	L2	Mansfield Town	3	1	0	2	0	4	3	+1	5	Advance to Round 2
3	L2	Crewe Alexandra	3	0	2	0	1	4	6	−2	4	
4	L1	Burton Albion	3	1	0	0	2	4	5	−1	3	

Source: EFL.com

3 September 2019 Group stage	Crewe Alexandra	1–3	Burton Albion	Crewe
19:30 BST	Kirk (yellow card) 81'; Green 87'	Report	Quinn 13'; Fraser 23'; Akins 45+1'; Brayford (yellow card) 82'; Wallace (yellow card) 89'	Stadium: Alexandra Stadium; Attendance: 917; Referee: Anthony Backhouse

1 October 2019 Group stage	Burton Albion	0–2	Everton U21	Burton upon Trent
19:45 BST		Report	Simms 6'; Evans 59'; Adeniran (yellow card) 90'	Stadium: Pirelli Stadium; Attendance: 435; Referee: Andy Haines

12 November 2019 Group stage	Burton Albion	1–2	Mansfield Town	Burton upon Trent
19:45 GMT	Templeton 35'; Buxton (yellow card) 37'; Fraser (yellow card) 52'; Anderson (yellow card) 72'; Quinn (yellow card) 74'	Report	Rose 23' (yellow card) 53'; Sweeney 34'; Preston (yellow card) 47'; Clarke (yellow card) 87'	Stadium: Pirelli Stadium; Attendance: 485; Referee: Leigh Doughty
