= 2020–21 Burton Albion F.C. season =

Burton Albion
2020–21 season
- Chairman: Ben Robinson
- Manager: Jake Buxton (until 29 December); Jimmy Floyd Hasselbaink (from 1 January)
- Stadium: Pirelli Stadium
- League One: 16th
- FA Cup: First round
- EFL Cup: Second round
- EFL Trophy: Group stage
- Top goalscorer: League: Kane Hemmings (15 goals); All: Kane Hemmings (15 goals)
Home colours	Away colours

The 2020–21 season is Burton Albion's 71st season in their history and the third consecutive season in EFL League One. Along with League One, the club will participate in the FA Cup, EFL Cup and EFL Trophy.

The season covers the period from 1 July 2020 to 30 June 2021.

== First-team squad ==
As of 18 January 2021

Note: Flags indicate national team as has been defined under FIFA eligibility rules. Players may hold more than one non-FIFA nationality.

No.	Name	Nat.	Position(s)	Date of birth (age)	Apps.	Goals	Year signed	Signed from	Transfer fee
Goalkeepers
1	Kieran O'Hara	(Republic of Ireland) (England)	GK	22 April 1996 (age 30)	60	0	2020	(England) Manchester United	Free
20	Callum Hawkins	(England)	GK	12 December 1999 (age 26)	0	0	2018	Academy	Trainee
24	Ben Garratt	(England)	GK	25 April 1994 (age 32)	33	0	2019	(England) Crewe Alexandra	Free
30	Dillon Barnes	(England)	GK	8 April 1997 (age 29)	1	0	2021	(England) Queens Park Rangers	Loan
Defenders
2	John Brayford	(England)	RB/CB	29 December 1987 (age 38)	279	17	2017	(England) Sheffield United	Free
3	Colin Daniel	(England)	LB/LM/LW	15 February 1988 (age 38)	72	2	2019	(England) Peterborough United	Undisclosed
5	Michael Bostwick	(England)	CB/RB/DM	17 May 1988 (age 38)	31	2	2020	(England) Lincoln City	Free
6	Kieran Wallace	(England)	LB/CB/DM	26 January 1995 (age 31)	78	2	2018	Free Agent	Free
15	Reece Hutchinson	(England)	LB	1 January 2001 (age 25)	56	0	2018	Academy	Trainee
16	Josh Earl	(England)	LB/CB	24 October 1998 (age 28)	7	0	2021	(England) Preston North End	Loan
17	Hayden Carter	(England)	CB/RB	17 December 1999 (age 26)	23	4	2021	(England) Blackburn Rovers	Loan
19	Jevan Anderson	(Scotland)	CB	3 March 2000 (age 26)	4	0	2019	(Scotland) Formartine United	Free
22	Owen Gallacher	(Scotland) (England)	LB/LW/RW	6 April 1999 (age 27)	12	0	2020	(England) Nottingham Forest	Free
23	Neal Eardley	(Wales)	RB/LB	6 November 1988 (age 38)	14	0	2020	(England) Lincoln City	Free
26	Ben Hart	(England)	RB	26 September 2000 (age 26)	1	0	2019	Academy	Trainee
37	Tom Hamer	(England)	RB/CB/DM	16 November 1999 (age 26)	20	2	2021	(England) Oldham Athletic	Undisclosed
38	Michael Mancienne	(England)	CB	8 January 1988 (age 38)	17	0	2021	(United States) New England Revolution	Free
Midfielders
4	Ryan Edwards	(Australia) (Singapore)	CM/AM/RM	17 November 1993 (age 32)	89	9	2019	(Scotland) Heart of Midlothian	Free
7	Stephen Quinn	(Republic of Ireland)	CM/DM/LM	1 April 1987 (age 39)	111	3	2018	(England) Reading	Free
8	Joe Powell	(England)	AM/LM/RM	30 October 1998 (age 28)	53	11	2020	(England) West Ham United	Undisclosed
11	Jonny Smith	(England)	LM/RM	28 July 1997 (age 29)	15	2	2021	(England) Bristol City	Undisclosed
12	Ben Fox	(England)	DM/CM/RB	1 February 1998 (age 28)	52	2	2016	Academy	Trainee
18	Ryan Broom	(Wales)	RM/CM/AM	4 September 1996 (age 30)	11	2	2021	(England) Peterborough United	Loan
21	John-Joe O'Toole	(Republic of Ireland) (England)	CM/AM/DM/CB	30 September 1988 (age 38)	56	1	2019	(England) Northampton Town	Free
25	Ciaran Gilligan	(Republic of Ireland)	RM/CM	5 February 2002 (age 24)	21	0	2020	Academy	Trainee
28	Sean Clare	(England)	CM/RM/RB	18 September 1996 (age 30)	19	1	2021	(England) Oxford United	Loan
39	Terry Taylor	(Wales) (Scotland)	DM/CB	29 June 2001 (age 25)	15	0	2021	(England) Wolverhampton Wanderers	Undisclosed
40	Danny Rowe	(England)	LW	9 March 1992 (age 34)	14	0	2021	Free agent	Free
Forwards
9	Kane Hemmings	(England)	CF/LW/RW	8 April 1992 (age 34)	42	9	2020	(Scotland) Dundee	Free
10	Lucas Akins	(England)	RW/LW/CF	25 February 1989 (age 37)	321	67	2014	(England) Stevenage	Free
13	Josh Parker	(Antigua and Barbuda) (England)	CF/LW/RW	1 December 1990 (age 35)	6	0	2021	(England) Wycombe Wanderers	Free
14	Luke Varney	(England)	CF/LW/RW	28 September 1982 (age 44)	40	2	2020	(England) Cheltenham Town	Free
27	Tom Hewlett	(England)	CF		2	0	2020	Academy	Trainee
33	Mike Fondop-Talom	(Cameroon)	CF	27 November 1993 (age 32)	17	2	2021	(England) Aldershot Town	Free
35	Jakub Niemczyk	(Poland)	LW/RW	22 January 2004 (age 22)	2	0	2020	Academy	Trainee

=== Statistics ===
As of 8 May 2021

No.	Pos	Nat	Player	Total		League One		FA Cup		League Cup		League Trophy	
No.	Pos	Nat	Player	Apps	Goals	Apps	Goals	Apps	Goals	Apps	Goals	Apps	Goals
1	GK	(Republic of Ireland) IRL	Kieran O'Hara	18	0	16+0	0	1+0	0	0+0	0	1+0	0
2	DF	(England) ENG	John Brayford	44	4	39+1	4	1+0	0	1+0	0	2+0	0
3	DF	(England) ENG	Colin Daniel	24	2	17+2	1	1+0	0	2+0	1	2+0	0
4	MF	(Australia) AUS	Ryan Edwards	45	2	36+5	1	1+0	0	1+0	0	1+1	1
5	DF	(England) ENG	Michael Bostwick	31	2	26+2	2	0+0	0	2+0	0	1+0	0
6	DF	(England) ENG	Kieran Wallace	17	0	9+3	0	1+0	0	2+0	0	2+0	0
8	MF	(England) ENG	Joe Powell	41	8	21+15	5	1+0	0	1+1	0	2+0	3
9	FW	(England) ENG	Kane Hemmings	41	13	26+9	13	1+0	0	2+0	0	3+0	0
10	FW	(England) ENG	Lucas Akins	47	10	43+0	8	1+0	0	2+0	1	1+0	1
11	MF	(England) ENG	Jonny Smith	15	2	13+2	2	0+0	0	0+0	0	0+0	0
12	MF	(England) ENG	Ben Fox	12	0	5+4	0	0+0	0	1+0	0	2+0	0
13	FW	(Antigua and Barbuda) ANT	Josh Parker	6	0	3+3	0	0+0	0	0+0	0	0+0	0
14	FW	(England) ENG	Luke Varney	4	0	0+4	0	0+0	0	0+0	0	0+0	0
15	DF	(England) ENG	Reece Hutchinson	2	0	0+1	0	0+0	0	0+0	0	1+0	0
16	DF	(England) ENG	Josh Earl*	7	0	6+1	0	0+0	0	0+0	0	0+0	0
17	DF	(England) ENG	Hayden Carter*	23	4	23+0	4	0+0	0	0+0	0	0+0	0
18	MF	(Wales) WAL	Ryan Broom	11	2	3+8	2	0+0	0	0+0	0	0+0	0
21	MF	(Republic of Ireland) IRL	John-Joe O'Toole	20	1	12+4	1	0+0	0	1+0	0	3+0	0
22	DF	(Scotland) SCO	Owen Gallacher	12	0	5+4	0	0+0	0	0+1	0	2+0	0
24	GK	(England) ENG	Ben Garratt	29	0	28+0	0	0+0	0	1+0	0	0+0	0
25	MF	(Republic of Ireland) IRL	Ciaran Gilligan	21	0	13+4	0	0+0	0	0+1	0	3+0	0
26	DF	(England) ENG	Ben Hart	1	0	0+0	0	0+0	0	0+0	0	1+0	0
27	FW	(England) ENG	Tom Hewlett	2	0	0+1	0	0+0	0	0+0	0	0+1	0
28	MF	(England) ENG	Sean Clarke*	19	1	18+1	1	0+0	0	0+0	0	0+0	0
29	DF	(England) ENG	Tom Armitage	1	0	0+0	0	0+0	0	0+0	0	0+1	0
30	GK	(England) ENG	Dillon Barnes	1	0	1+0	0	0+0	0	0+0	0	0+0	0
33	FW	(Cameroon) CMR	Mike Fondop-Talom	17	2	8+9	2	0+0	0	0+0	0	0+0	0
35	FW	(Poland) POL	Jakub Niemczyk	2	0	0+0	0	0+0	0	0+0	0	0+2	0
36	DF	(England) ENG	Theirry Latty-Fairweather	1	0	0+0	0	0+0	0	0+0	0	0+1	0
37	DF	(England) ENG	Tom Hamer*	20	2	19+1	2	0+0	0	0+0	0	0+0	0
38	DF	(England) ENG	Michael Mancienne	17	0	14+3	0	0+0	0	0+0	0	0+0	0
39	MF	(Wales) WAL	Terry Taylor	15	0	5+10	0	0+0	0	0+0	0	0+0	0
40	MF	(England) ENG	Danny Rowe	14	0	7+7	0	0+0	0	0+0	0	0+0	0
Players out on loan:
7	MF	(Republic of Ireland) IRL	Stephen Quinn	24	1	20+1	1	0+0	0	2+0	0	0+1	0
19	DF	(Scotland) SCO	Jevan Anderson	1	0	0+0	0	0+0	0	0+0	0	0+1	0
23	DF	(Wales) WAL	Neal Eardley	14	0	9+1	0	1+0	0	1+0	0	2+0	0
Players who left the club:
11	MF	(Scotland) SCO	Steven Lawless	19	1	7+8	0	0+0	0	1+1	0	2+0	1
16	FW	(United States) USA	Indiana Vassilev*	12	0	8+4	0	0+0	0	0+0	0	0+0	0
17	MF	(Cyprus) CYP	Jack Roles*	3	0	0+2	0	0+1	0	0+0	0	0+0	0
18	MF	(England) ENG	Charles Vernam	16	2	11+3	2	0+1	0	1+0	0	0+0	0
28	GK	(England) ENG	Teddy Sharman-Lowe*	3	0	0+0	0	0+0	0	1+0	0	2+0	0
37	DF	(England) ENG	Sam Hughes*	15	2	14+0	2	1+0	0	0+0	0	0+0	0
38	FW	(England) ENG	Niall Ennis*	10	0	6+3	0	1+0	0	0+0	0	0+0	0

==== Goals record ====
As of 8 May 2021

Rank	No.	Nat.	Po.	Name	League One	FA Cup	League Cup	League Trophy	Total
1	9	(England)	CF	Kane Hemmings	13	0	0	0	13
2	10	(England)	RW	Lucas Akins	8	0	1	1	10
3	8	(England)	AM	Joe Powell	5	0	0	3	8
4	17	(England)	CB	Hayden Carter	4	0	0	0	4
5	2	(England)	RB	John Brayford	3	0	0	0	3
6	3	(England)	LB	Colin Daniel	1	0	1	0	2
6	4	(Australia)	CM	Ryan Edwards	1	0	0	1	2
6	5	(England)	CB	Michael Bostwick	2	0	0	0	2
6	11	(England)	LM	Jonny Smith	2	0	0	0	2
6	18	(England)	LM	Ryan Broom	2	0	0	0	2
6	~~18~~	(England)	AM	Charles Vernam	2	0	0	0	2
6	33	(Cameroon)	CF	Mike Fondop-Talom	2	0	0	0	2
6	~~37~~	(England)	CB	Sam Hughes	2	0	0	0	2
37	(England)	RB	Tom Hamer	2	0	0	0	2	
15	7	(Republic of Ireland)	CM	Stephen Quinn	1	0	0	0	1
15	~~11~~	(Scotland)	LW	Steven Lawless	0	0	0	1	1
15	28	(England)	CM	Sean Clare	1	0	0	0	1
Own Goals					3	0	0	0	3
Total					53	0	2	6	61

==== Disciplinary record ====
As of 8 May 2021

Rank	No.	Nat.	Po.	Name	League One			FA Cup			League Cup			League Trophy			Total			
Rank	No.	Nat.	Po.	Name	Yellow card	(yellow card) (yellow-red card)	Red card	Yellow card	(yellow card) (yellow-red card)	Red card	Yellow card	(yellow card) (yellow-red card)	Red card	Yellow card	(yellow card) (yellow-red card)	Red card	Yellow card	(yellow card) (yellow-red card)	Red card	
1	7	(Republic of Ireland)	CM	Stephen Quinn	6	0	0	0	0	0	1	0	0	0	0	0	7	0	0	
1	9	(England)	CF	Kane Hemmings	6	0	0	1	0	0	0	0	0	0	0	0	7	0	0	
1	17	(England)	CB	Hayden Carter	7	0	0	0	0	0	0	0	0	0	0	0	7	0	0	
1	28	(England)	CM	Sean Clare	7	0	0	0	0	0	0	0	0	0	0	0	7	0	0	
5	2	(England)	RB	John Brayford	3	0	0	1	0	0	0	0	0	0	0	0	4	0	0	
5	4	(England)	CM	Ryan Edwards	4	0	0	0	0	0	0	0	0	0	0	0	4	0	0	
5	10	(England)	RW	Lucas Akins	3	0	0	0	0	0	1	0	0	0	0	0	4	0	0	
5	16	(England)	LB	Josh Earl	2	1	0	0	0	0	0	0	0	0	0	0	2	1	0	
5	21	(Republic of Ireland)	CM	John-Joe O'Toole	3	0	1	0	0	0	0	0	0	0	0	0	3	0	1	
5	25	(England)	RM	Ciaran Gilligan	4	0	0	0	0	0	0	0	0	0	0	0	4	0	0	
5	39	(Wales)	DM	Terry Taylor	4	0	0	0	0	0	0	0	0	0	0	0	4	0	0	
12	3	(England)	LB	Colin Daniel	2	0	0	0	0	0	0	0	0	1	0	0	3	0	0	
12	5	(England)	CB	Michael Bostwick	3	0	0	0	0	0	0	0	0	0	0	0	3	0	0	
12	8	(England)	AM	Joe Powell	2	0	0	1	0	0	0	0	0	0	0	0	3	0	0	
12	22	(Scotland)	LB	Owen Gallacher	2	0	0	0	0	0	0	0	0	1	0	0	3	0	0	
12	33	(Cameroon)	CF	Mike Fondop-Talom	3	0	0	0	0	0	0	0	0	0	0	0	3	0	0	
12	~~37~~	(England)	CB	Sam Hughes	1	1	0	0	0	0	0	0	0	0	0	0	1	1	0	
18	6	(England)	LB	Kieran Wallace	1	0	0	0	0	0	0	0	0	1	0	0	2	0	0	
18	11	(England)	LM	Jonny Smith	2	0	0	0	0	0	0	0	0	0	0	0	2	0	0	
18	38	(England)	CB	Michael Maccienne	2	0	0	0	0	0	0	0	0	0	0	0	2	0	0	
21	1	(Republic of Ireland)	GK	Kieran O'Hara	1	0	0	0	0	0	0	0	0	0	0	0	1	0	0	
21	12	(England)	DM	Ben Fox	1	0	0	0	0	0	0	0	0	0	0	0	1	0	0	
21	14	(England)	CF	Luke Varney	1	0	0	0	0	0	0	0	0	0	0	0	1	0	0	
21	~~16~~	(United States)	LW	Indiana Vassilev	1	0	0	0	0	0	0	0	0	0	0	0	1	0	0	
21	18	(Wales)	RM	Ryan Broom	1	0	0	0	0	0	0	0	0	0	0	0	1	0	0	
21	23	(Wales)	RB	Neal Eardley	0	0	0	0	0	0	1	0	0	0	0	0	1	0	0	
21	24	(England)	GK	Ben Garratt	1	0	0	0	0	0	0	0	0	0	0	0	1	0	0	
21	36	(England)	DF	Thierry Latty-Fairweather	0	0	0	0	0	0	0	0	0	1	0	0	1	0	0	
21	Total					72	2	1	3	0	0	3	0	0	4	0	0	82	2	1

== Transfers ==
=== Transfers in ===
Date	Pos.	Nat.	Name	From	Fee	Ref.
13 July 2020	LW	(Scotland)	Steven Lawless	(Scotland) Livingston	Free transfer	
20 July 2020	AM	(England)	Charles Vernam	(England) Grimsby Town	Free transfer	
4 August 2020	RB	(Wales)	Neal Eardley	(England) Lincoln City	Free transfer	
5 August 2020	DM	(England)	Michael Bostwick	(England) Lincoln City	Free transfer	
12 August 2020	CF	(England)	Kane Hemmings	(Scotland) Dundee	Free transfer	
12 August 2020	LW	(England)	Luke Varney	(England) Cheltenham Town	Free transfer	
11 September 2020	RW	(Scotland)	Owen Gallacher	(England) Nottingham Forest	Free transfer	
11 September 2020	GK	(Republic of Ireland)	Kieran O'Hara	(England) Manchester United	Free transfer	
15 January 2021	CF	(Antigua and Barbuda)	Josh Parker	(England) Wycombe Wanderers	Free transfer	
29 January 2021	RB	(England)	Tom Hamer	(England) Oldham Athletic	Undisclosed	
29 January 2021	LM	(England)	Jonny Smith	(England) Bristol City	Undisclosed	
1 February 2021	DM	(Wales)	Terry Taylor	(England) Wolverhampton Wanderers	Undisclosed	
9 February 2021	CB	(England)	Michael Mancienne	(United States) New England Revolution	Free transfer	
13 February 2021	LW	(England)	Danny Rowe	(England) Ipswich Town	Free transfer	
20 February 2021	CF	(Cameroon)	Mike Fondop	(England) Aldershot Town	Free transfer	

=== Loans in ===
Date	Pos.	Nat.	Name	From	Date until	Ref.
6 September 2020	GK	(England)	Teddy Sharman-Lowe	(England) Chelsea	4 January 2021	
17 September 2020	CM	(Cyprus)	Jack Roles	(England) Tottenham Hotspur	1 January 2021	
17 September 2020	LW	(United States)	Indiana Vassilev	(England) Aston Villa	28 January 2021	
9 October 2020	CB	(England)	Sam Hughes	(England) Leicester City	1 January 2021	
16 October 2020	CF	(England)	Niall Ennis	(England) Wolverhampton Wanderers	5 January 2021	
6 January 2021	CB	(England)	Hayden Carter	(England) Blackburn Rovers	End of season	
12 January 2021	CM	(England)	Sean Clare	(England) Oxford United	End of season	
18 January 2021	GK	(England)	Dillon Barnes	(England) Queens Park Rangers	End of season	
1 February 2021	RM	(Wales)	Ryan Broom	(England) Peterborough United	End of season	
1 February 2021	LB	(England)	Josh Earl	(England) Preston North End	End of season	

=== Loans out ===
Date	Pos.	Nat.	Name	To	Date until	Ref.
6 October 2020	DF	(England)	Tom Armitage	(England) Tamworth	1 November 2020	
6 October 2020	RB	(England)	Ben Hart	(England) Tamworth	1 November 2020	
4 December 2020	CB	(Scotland)	Jevan Anderson	(England) Kettering Town	1 January 2021	
18 December 2020	DM	(England)	Ben Fox	(England) Barnet	15 January 2021	
21 December 2020	RB	(England)	Ben Hart	(England) Redditch United	15 January 2021	
14 January 2021	RB	(Wales)	Neal Eardley	(England) Barrow	End of season	
15 January 2021	CM	(Republic of Ireland)	Stephen Quinn	(England) Mansfield Town	End of season	

=== Transfers out ===
Date	Pos.	Nat.	Name	To	Fee	Ref.
1 July 2020	GK	(England)	Stephen Bywater	Retired		
1 July 2020	AM	(Scotland)	Scott Fraser	(England) Milton Keynes Dons	Rejected contract	
1 July 2020	CM	(England)	Joe Sbarra	(England) Solihull Moors	Released	
1 July 2020	CF	(England)	Kwame Thomas	(Wales) Wrexham	Released	
1 July 2020	MF	(England)	Ethan Vale	(England) Newcastle Town	Released	
9 July 2020	CF	(Montenegro)	Oliver Sarkic	(England) Blackpool	Free transfer	
6 September 2020	GK	(England)	Teddy Sharman-Lowe	(England) Chelsea	Undisclosed	
15 January 2021	LW	(Scotland)	Steven Lawless	(England) Motherwell	Free transfer	
1 February 2021	AM	(England)	Charles Vernam	(England) Bradford City	Undisclosed	

== Pre-season ==
22 August 2020 Friendly	Stoke City	0–1	Burton Albion	Stoke-on-Trent
15:00 BST		Report	Hemmings 45+4'	Stadium: Bet365 Stadium

25 August 2020 Friendly	Burton Albion	2–3	Coventry City	Burton upon Trent
19:00 BST	Hemmings 18', 58'	Report	Allen 49'; Bakayoko 74'; Jones 89'	Stadium: Pirelli Stadium; Attendance: 0

29 August 2020 Friendly	Walsall	1–1	Burton Albion	Bescot
15:00 BST	Gordon 10'	Report	Brayford 14'	Stadium: Banks's Stadium; Attendance: 0

== Competitions ==
=== EFL League One ===
==== League table ====
Pos	Team	Pld	W	D	L	GF	GA	GD	Pts
12	Crewe Alexandra	46	18	12	16	56	61	−5	66
13	Milton Keynes Dons	46	18	11	17	64	62	+2	65
14	Doncaster Rovers	46	19	7	20	63	67	−4	64
15	Fleetwood Town	46	16	12	18	49	46	+3	60
16	Burton Albion	46	15	12	19	61	73	−12	57
17	Shrewsbury Town	46	13	15	18	50	57	−7	54
18	Plymouth Argyle	46	14	11	21	53	80	−27	53
19	AFC Wimbledon	46	12	15	19	54	70	−16	51
20	Wigan Athletic	46	13	9	24	54	77	−23	48

Source: EFL Official Website
Rules for classification: 1) Points; 2) Goal difference; 3) Number of goals scored; 4) Head-to-head results; 5) Wins; 6) Away goals; 7) Penalty points (sec 9.5); 8) 12-point sending off offences

==== Results summary ====
Overall								Home						Away					
Pld	W	D	L	GF	GA	GD	Pts	W	D	L	GF	GA	GD	W	D	L	GF	GA	GD
46	15	12	19	61	73	−12	57	7	4	12	32	42	−10	8	8	7	29	31	−2

Last updated: 9 May 2021.
Source: BBC

==== Results by matchday ====
Matchday	1	2	3	4	5	6	7	8	9	10	11	12	13	14	15	16	17	18	19	20	21	22	23	24	25	26	27	28	29	30	31	32	33	34	35	36	37	38	39	40	41	42	43	44	45	46
Ground	A	H	A	H	A	A	H	H	A	H	A	A	H	H	A	H	A	A	H	A	H	A	A	H	H	A	H	A	A	H	H	A	A	A	H	H	A	H	A	A	H	H	A	H	H	A
Result	L	W	L	L	L	D	L	D	D	L	D	L	L	W	D	D	D	L	L	L	L	L	W	L	W	W	L	W	W	W	W	W	W	D	L	L	D	W	W	W	D	L	D	W	D	L
Position	17	10	15	23	23	21	24	24	24	23	23	23	24	22	22	22	24	24	24	24	24	24	24	24	24	24	24	24	21	18	18	18	18	18	18	18	18	18	18	18	17	17	17	16	16	16

Updated to match(es) played on 9 May 2021. Source: 11v11 for league tables and fixtures
A = Away; H = Home; W = Win; D = Draw; L = Loss

==== Matches ====
Win Draw Loss Postponed

The 2020/21 season fixtures were released on 21 August.

12 September 2020 1	Fleetwood Town	2–1	Burton Albion	Fleetwood
15:00 BST	Camps 17'; Burns (yellow card) 19'; Madden 79'; Whelan (yellow card) 84'	Report	Brayford 66'; Bostwick (yellow card) 70'; O'Toole (red card) 90+5'	Stadium: Highbury Stadium; Attendance: 0 Referee: Martin Coy

19 September 2020 2	Burton Albion	2–1	Accrington Stanley	Burton upon Trent
15:00 BST	Quinn (yellow card) 56'; Powell 72'; Brayford 87'; Garratt (yellow card) 90+4'	Report	Burgess (yellow card) 76'; Pritchard 83'; Allan (yellow card) 85'	Stadium: Pirelli Stadium; Attendance: 0 Referee: Josh Smith

26 September 2020 3	Swindon Town	4–2	Burton Albion	Swindon
15:00 BST	Stevens 7'; Pitman 31'; Payne (yellow card) 34'; Baudry 35'; Fryers (yellow card) 45'; M. Smith (yellow card) 58'; J. Smith 60'	Report	Quinn 40'; Akins 77'	Stadium: County Ground; Attendance: 0 Referee: Kevin Johnson

3 October 2020 4	Burton Albion	2–4	Portsmouth	Burton-upon-Trent
15:00 BST	Akins 14'; Naylor 20' (o.g.); Hemmings (yellow card) 77'	Report	Harness 2', 47', 74'; Harrison (yellow card) 25'; Whatmough 60'	Stadium: Pirelli Stadium; Attendance: 0 Referee: Tom Nield

10 October 2020 5	Plymouth Argyle	2–0	Burton Albion	Plymouth
15:00 BST	Jephcott 25'; Moore 47'; Watts (yellow card) 63'; Canavan (yellow card) 72'	Report	Hemmings (yellow card) 58'; Daniel (yellow card) 83'	Stadium: Home Park; Attendance: 0 Referee: David Rock

17 October 2020 6	Bristol Rovers	1–1	Burton Albion	Horfield
15:00 BST	Daly 52'; Ehmer (yellow card) 72'	Report	O'Toole (yellow card) 18'; Quinn (yellow card) 33'; Fox (yellow card) 35'; Hemmings 79'	Stadium: Memorial Stadium; Attendance: 0 Referee: Charles Breakspear

20 October 2020 7	Burton Albion	0–1	Rochdale	Burton upon Trent
19:45 BST	O'Toole (yellow card) 35'	Report	Lund 49'; Roberts (yellow card) 50'	Stadium: Pirelli Stadium; Attendance: 0 Referee: Sam Purkiss

24 October 2020 8	Burton Albion	1–1	AFC Wimbledon	Burton upon Trent
15:00 BST	Gilligan (yellow card) 24'; Akins (yellow card) 28'; Hemmings 66'	Report	Longman 65'	Stadium: Pirelli Stadium; Attendance: 0 Referee: Sam Barrott

27 October 2020 9	Peterborough United	2–2	Burton Albion	Peterborough
19:00 GMT	Clarke-Harris 10' (penalty missed) 48'; Ward 48'; Mason (yellow card) 89'	Report	Hemmings 32', 60'; Gilligan (yellow card) 58'; Akins (yellow card) 62'; O'Toole (yellow card) 71'	Stadium: Weston Homes Stadium; Attendance: 0 Referee: Paul Howard

31 October 2020 10	Burton Albion	1–2	Blackpool	Burton upon Trent
15:00 GMT	Quinn (yellow card) 39'; Grétarsson 63' (o.g.); Gilligan (yellow card) 77'	Report	Yates 21', 75' (pen.); Maxwell (yellow card) 40'	Stadium: Pirelli Stadium; Attendance: 0 Referee: Declan Bourne

3 November 2020 11	Shrewsbury Town	1–1	Burton Albion	Shrewsbury
18:00 GMT	Udoh (yellow card) 65' (goal) 90+9'; Daniels (yellow card) 76'; Ebanks-Landell (yellow card) 88'	Report	Edwards (yellow card) 24'; Hemmings 59'; O'Hara (yellow card) 87'; Varney (yellow card) 90+5'	Stadium: Montgomery Waters Meadow; Attendance: 0 Referee: Anthony Backhouse

14 November 2020 12	Hull City	2–0	Burton Albion	Kingston upon Hull
15:00 GMT	Docherty (yellow card) 53'; Adelakun (yellow card) 60'; Wilks 62'; Eaves 88'	Report	Hughes (yellow card) 7' (yellow-red card) 18'	Stadium: KCOM Stadium; Attendance: 0 Referee: Graham Salisbury

21 November 2020 13	Burton Albion	1–3	Northampton Town	Burton upon Trent
15:00 GMT	Vassilev (yellow card) 21'; Quinn (yellow card) 88'; Akins 90+2' (pen.)	Report	Smith 2', 67'; Chukwuemeka (yellow card) 53'; Lines 81'	Stadium: Pirelli Stadium; Attendance: 0 Referee: Seb Stockbridge

24 November 2020 14	Burton Albion	4–2	Charlton Athletic	Burton upon Trent
19:00 GMT	Akins 9' (yellow card) 64'; Powell 39'; Hughes 53'; Vernam 76'	Report	Gunter (yellow card) 30'; Smyth 41'; Gilbey (yellow card) 61'; Watson (yellow card) 65'; Aneke 67' (yellow card) 81'; Maatsen (yellow card) 80'	Stadium: Pirelli Stadium; Attendance: 0 Referee: Ollie Yates

1 December 2020 15	Sunderland	1–1	Burton Albion	Sunderland
19:00 GMT	Power 85'	Report	Edwards (yellow card) 31'; Vernam 60'; Gallacher (yellow card) 90+2'	Stadium: Stadium of Light; Attendance: 0 Referee: Chris Sarginson

5 December 2020 16	Burton Albion	1–1	Crewe Alexandra	Burton upon Trent
15:00 GMT	Bostwick (yellow card) 52'; Hughes (yellow card) 71' (goal) 76'; Powell (yellow card) 90+3'	Report	Johnson (yellow card) 60'; Dale 88'	Stadium: Pirelli Stadium; Attendance: 0 Referee: Andy Haines

12 December 2020 17	Milton Keynes Dons	1–1	Burton Albion	Denbigh
15:00 GMT	Fraser 73' (pen.)	Report	Daniel 8'; Quinn (yellow card) 67'; Wallace (yellow card) 75'	Stadium: Stadium mk Attendance: 0 Referee: Graham Salisbury

15 December 2020 18	Ipswich Town	2–1	Burton Albion	Ipswich
19:45 GMT	Bennetts 4'; McGuinness (yellow card) 51'; Jackson (yellow card) 53'; Huws 80'; Dobra (yellow card) 90+3'	Report	Powell 21'; Daniel (yellow card) 58'; Bostwick (yellow card) 87'; Edwards (yellow card) 90+3'; Brayford (yellow card) 90+3'	Stadium: Portman Road; Attendance: 0 Referee: Darren Bond

19 December 2020 19	Burton Albion	1–3	Doncaster Rovers	Burton upon Trent
15:00 GMT	Akins 44' (pen.)	Report	Okenabirhie 8'; Butler (yellow card) 35'; Richards (yellow card) 43' (goal) 59'; Whiteman 45+5' (pen.)	Stadium: Pirelli Stadium; Referee: Carl Brook

26 December 2020 20	Lincoln City	5–1	Burton Albion	Lincoln
15:00 GMT	Howarth 4'; Johnson 7', 63' (yellow card) 80'; Scully 56'; Walsh (yellow card) 60'; Anderson 81'	Report	Hemmings 74'	Stadium: LNER Stadium; Attendance: 0 Referee: James Bell

29 December 2020 21	Burton Albion	3–4	Wigan Athletic	Burton upon Trent
18:30 GMT	O'Toole 13'; Brayford 25'; Hemmings 72'	Report	Joseph 19', 28', 73'; Keane 83'	Stadium: Pirelli Stadium; Attendance: 0 Referee: Sam Barrott

2 January 2021 22	Burton Albion	1–5	Oxford United	Burton upon Trent
15:00 GMT	Quinn (yellow card) 5'; Hemmings 41'	Report	Taylor 9'; Shodipo 18', 31'; Ruffels 56', 63'	Stadium: Pirelli Stadium; Attendance: 0 Referee: Peter Wright

9 January 2021 23	Gillingham	0–1	Burton Albion	Gillingham
14:00 GMT		Report	Carter 33'	Stadium: Priestfield Stadium; Attendance: 0 Referee: Brett Huxtable

16 January 2021 24	Burton Albion	0–1	Ipswich Town	Burton upon Trent
15:00 GMT	Brayford (yellow card) 62'; Gallacher (yellow card) 75'	Report	Chambers (yellow card) 29'; Norwood (yellow card) 54'; McGuinness 73'; Dozzell (yellow card) 83'; Drinan (yellow card) 85'	Stadium: Pirelli Stadium; Attendance: 0 Referee: Neil Hair

6 February 2021 25	Burton Albion	1–0	Hull City	Burton upon Trent
15:00 GMT	Edwards (yellow card) 26'; Earl (yellow card) 61'; Smith 90'	Report	Coyle (yellow card) 90+3'	Stadium: Pirelli Stadium; Attendance: 0 Referee: Sam Allison

13 February 2021 26	Northampton Town	0–2	Burton Albion	Northampton
15:00 GMT	Kioso (yellow card) 64'; Hoskins (yellow card) 82'	Report	Bostwick 77'; Clare (yellow card) 82'; Edwards 90+4'	Stadium: PTS Academy Stadium; Attendance: 0 Referee: Scott Oldham

20 February 2021 27	Burton Albion	0–3	Sunderland	Burton upon Trent
15:00 GMT	Earl (yellow card) 5' (yellow-red card) 56'; Clare (yellow card) 52'; Carter (yellow card) 65'; Fondop (yellow card) 89' Jimmy Floyd Hasselbaink (yellow card)	Report	Leadbitter 6'; McGeady (yellow card) 18'; Gooch 32', (yellow card) 38'; O'Brien (yellow card) 56'; Wyke 76'	Stadium: Pirelli Stadium; Attendance: 0 Referee: Craig Hicks

23 February 2021 28	Charlton Athletic	1–2	Burton Albion	Charlton
19:00 GMT	Stockley 9'	Report	Fondop 25'; Watson 53' (o.g.)	Stadium: The Valley; Attendance: 0 Referee: Christopher Pollard

27 February 2021 29	Rochdale	0–2	Burton Albion	Rochdale
15:00 GMT	Baah (yellow card) 40'; Rathbone (red card) 77'; O'Connell (yellow card) 90+2'	Report	Hemmings 65'; Clare (yellow card) 75'; Smith (yellow card) 78'; Akins 86'	Stadium: Spotland; Attendance: 0 Referee: Marc Edwards

2 March 2021 30	Burton Albion	1–0	Bristol Rovers	Burton upon Trent
19:00 GMT	Clare (yellow card) 43'; Smith 55'; Carter (yellow card) 90+2'; Hemmings (yellow card) 90+6'	Report	McCormick (yellow card) 11' (yellow-red card) 52'	Stadium: Pirelli Stadium; Attendance: 0 Referee: Charles Breakspear

6 March 2021 31	Burton Albion	2–1	Peterborough United	Burton upon Trent
15:00 GMT	Smith (yellow card) 6'; Hemmings 54'; Carter 58', (yellow card) 90+4'; Brayford (yellow card) 68'	Report	Beevers (yellow card) 57'; Burrows 90+5'	Stadium: Pirelli Stadium; Attendance: 0 Referee: Carl Brook

9 March 2021 32	AFC Wimbledon	0–1	Burton Albion	Wimbledon
19:00 GMT	Heneghan (yellow card) 49'	Report	Bostwick 59'	Stadium: Plough Lane; Attendance: 0 Referee: Bobby Madley

13 March 2021 33	Crewe Alexandra	0–3	Burton Albion	Crewe
15:00 GMT		Report	Hemmings 9', 23', 34'; Taylor (yellow card) 76'; Carter (yellow card) 90+4'	Stadium: Alexandra Stadium; Attendance: 0 Referee: Graham Salisbury

16 March 2021 34	Blackpool	1–1	Burton Albion	Blackpool
19:00 GMT	Garbutt 64'	Report	Carter 24', (yellow card) 71'	Stadium: Bloomfield Road; Attendance: 0 Referee: Chris Sarginson

20 March 2021 35	Burton Albion	1–2	Milton Keynes Dons	Burton upon Trent
15:00 GMT	Clare (yellow card) 41'; Carter (yellow card) 58'; Hemmings (yellow card) 68'; Akins 74' (pen.)	Report	Fraser 15' (pen.); McEachran (yellow card) 57'; O'Hora 61'; Harvie (yellow card) 90+3'	Stadium: Pirelli Stadium; Attendance: 0 Referee: Ross Joyce

23 March 2021 36	Burton Albion	1–2	Shrewsbury Town	Burton upon Trent
19:00 GMT	Clare 60'	Report	Main 6', (yellow card) 90'; Chapman 56'; Ogbeta (yellow card) 78'	Stadium: Pirelli Stadium; Attendance: 0 Referee: Carl Boyeson

2 April 2021 37	Accrington Stanley	0–0	Burton Albion	Accrington
15:00 BST		Report	Mancienne (yellow card) 53'	Stadium: Wham Stadium; Attendance: 0 Referee: Seb Stockbridge

5 April 2021 38	Burton Albion	2–1	Swindon Town	Burton upon Trent
15:00 BST	Hamer 26'; Hemmings (yellow card) 64'; Brayford 83'	Report	Payne 35'	Stadium: Pirelli Stadium; Attendance: 0 Referee: Lee Swabey

10 April 2021 39	Portsmouth	1–2	Burton Albion	Milton
15:00 BST	Daniels 88'	Report	Clare (yellow card) 40'; Fondop 45'; Powell 47'	Stadium: Fratton Park; Attendance: 0 Referee: John Busby

13 April 2021 40	Doncaster Rovers	0–3	Burton Albion	Doncaster
19:00 BST	Greaves (yellow card) 39'; Coppinger (yellow card) 78'	Report	Akins 59'; Hamer 72'; Carter 78'	Stadium: Keepmoat Stadium; Attendance: 0 Referee: David Rock

17 April 2021 41	Burton Albion	1–1	Plymouth Argyle	Burton upon Trent
12:30 BST	Clare (yellow card) 19'; Broom 90+3'	Report	Watts (yellow card) 28'; Mayor (yellow card) 56'; Hardie 69'; Opoku (yellow card) 73'	Stadium: Pirelli Stadium; Attendance: 0 Referee: Antony Coggins

20 April 2021 42	Burton Albion	0–1	Lincoln City	Burton upon Trent
19:00 BST	Fondop (yellow card) 88'; Taylor (yellow card) 90+3'	Report	Eyoma 27'	Stadium: Pirelli Stadium; Attendance: 0 Referee: Josh Smith

24 April 2021 43	Wigan Athletic	1–1	Burton Albion	Wigan
15:00 BST	Keane 37'	Report	Powell (yellow card) 12', (goal) 16'	Stadium: DW Stadium; Attendance: 0 Referee: Charles Breakspear

27 April 2021 44	Burton Albion	5–2	Fleetwood Town	Burton upon Trent
19:00 BST	Earl (yellow card) 27'; Akins 35'; Powell 39'; Hamer 72'; Hemmings (yellow card) 74', (goal) 85', 90+5'; Taylor (yellow card) 78'	Report	Biggins (yellow card) 45+4'; Finley 62'; Rossiter 90+2'	Stadium: Pirelli Stadium; Attendance: 0 Referee: Anthony Backhouse

1 May 2021 45	Burton Albion	1–1	Gillingham	Burton upon Trent
15:00 BST	Taylor (yellow card) 13'; Hemmings (yellow card) 45+1'; Earl (yellow card) 85'; Broom 90', (yellow card) 90+1'; Fondop-Talum (yellow card) 90+1'	Report	Graham 37'; MacDonald (yellow card) 39'	Stadium: Pirelli Stadium; Attendance: 0 Referee: Ben Toner

9 May 2021 46	Oxford United	4–0	Burton Albion	Oxford
12:00 BST	Shodipo 10'; Taylor 28'; Lee 57'; Winnall 90+2'	Report	Mancienne (yellow card) 11'; Taylor (yellow card) 56'; Gilligan (yellow card) 72'; Carter (yellow card) 79'	Stadium: Kassam Stadium; Attendance: 0 Referee: Thomas Bramall

=== FA Cup ===
The draw for the first round was made on Monday 26, October.

Win Draw Loss

8 November 2020 First round	Barnet	1–0	Burton Albion	Canons Park
12:45 GMT	Fonguck 10'; Taylor (yellow card) 29'; Preston (red card) 45'	Report	Hemmings (yellow card) 35'; Powell (yellow card) 45+2'	Stadium: The Hive Stadium; Attendance: 0 Referee: Trevor Kettle

=== EFL Cup ===
Win Draw Loss

The first round draw was made on 18 August, live on Sky Sports, by Paul Merson. The draw for both the second and third round were confirmed on September 6, live on Sky Sports by Phil Babb.

4 September 2020 First round	Burton Albion	1–1 (4–2 p)	Accrington Stanley	Burton upon Trent
19:30 BST	Akins 32'; Eardley (yellow card) 81'	Report	Burgess 82'	Stadium: Pirelli Stadium; Attendance: 0 Referee: Andy Haines
	Penalties
	Akins (penalty scored); Hemmings (penalty scored); Quinn (penalty scored); Eardley (penalty scored)		Pritchard (penalty missed); Butcher (penalty missed); Sangare (penalty scored); Charles (penalty scored)

15 September 2020 Second round	Burton Albion	1–3	Aston Villa	Burton upon Trent
19:45 BST	Daniel 2'; Akins (yellow card) 62'; Quinn (yellow card) 89'	Report	Watkins 39'; Ramsey (yellow card) 69'; Grealish 88'; Davis 90+2'	Stadium: Pirelli Stadium; Attendance: 0 Referee: Oliver Langford

=== EFL Trophy ===
Win Draw Loss

The regional group stage draw was confirmed on 18 August.

Pos	Div	Team	Pld	W	PW	PL	L	GF	GA	GD	Pts	Qualification
1	L2	Cambridge United	3	2	1	0	0	7	3	+4	8	Advance to Round 2
2	L1	Peterborough United	3	1	1	1	0	8	6	+2	6	Advance to Round 2
3	L1	Burton Albion	3	0	1	1	1	6	8	−2	3	
4	ACA	Fulham U21	3	0	0	1	2	3	7	−4	1	

Source: EFL.com

8 September 2020 Group stage	Peterborough United	3–3 (5–4 p)	Burton Albion	Peterborough
19:00 BST	Clarke 3'; Reed 23' (yellow card) 90'; Mason 68'; Hamilton (yellow card) 90+6'	Report	Lawless 44'; Powell 52', 55'; Wallace (yellow card) 77'	Stadium: Weston Homes Stadium; Attendance: 0 Referee: Will Finnie
	Penalties
	Burrows (penalty scored); Hamilton (penalty scored); Reed (penalty scored); Eisa (penalty scored); Clarke (penalty scored)		Bostwick (penalty scored); Fox (penalty scored); Powell (penalty scored); O'Toole (penalty scored); Gilligan (penalty missed)

6 October 2020 Group stage	Burton Albion	2–4	Cambridge United	Burton upon Trent
19:00 BST	Akins 3'; Powell 4'; Gallacher (yellow card) 20'; Daniel (yellow card) 45+3'	Report	Knibbs 27' (yellow card) 90'; Hannant 31', 86'; Digby (yellow card) 73'; Darling 79'	Stadium: Pirelli Stadium; Attendance: 0 Referee: Ross Joyce

10 November 2020 Group stage	Burton Albion	1–1 (4–1 p)	Fulham U21	Burton upon Trent
19:00 GMT	Edwards 34'; Latty-Fairweather (yellow card) 65'	Report	Hemmings 10' (o.g.)	Stadium: Pirelli Stadium; Attendance: 0 Referee: Robert Lewis
	Penalties
	Hemmings (penalty scored); Lawless (penalty scored); Hart (penalty scored) (penalty scored)		Bierith (penalty missed); Harris (penalty missed); Pajaziti (penalty scored)
