= Richard Nartey =

English footballer

Personal information
- Full name: Richard Nicos Tettey Nartey
- Date of birth: 6 September 1998 (age 28)
- Place of birth: Hammersmith, England
- Height: 1.83 m (6 ft 0 in)
- Position: Defender

Youth career
- 2007–2019: Chelsea

Senior career*
Years	Team	Apps	(Gls)
2019–2020	Chelsea	0	(0)
2019–2020	→ Burton Albion (loan)	25	(0)
2020–2022	Burnley	0	(0)
2021–2022	→ Mansfield Town (loan)	3	(0)
2022–2023	Salford City	11	(0)
2024–2025	Barnet	2	(0)
- * Club domestic league appearances and goals as of 21:11, 29 November 2024 (UTC)

Richard Nicos Tettey Nartey (born 6 September 1998) is an English professional footballer who plays as a central defender.

== Career ==
Nartey signed for Chelsea as an Under-9. He began playing full-time for the club at age 16. He moved on loan to Burton Albion in June 2019. He was released by Chelsea at the end of the 2019–20 season.

In November 2020 he signed for Burnley. He signed a new contract with the club in June 2021, for 12 months with the option of a further year. He moved on a season-long loan to Mansfield Town on 31 August. He spent most of the season injured. In February 2022, following just three league appearances, it was announced that Nartey would remain on loan at Mansfield, but would return to Burnley to train with the club and play with their under-23 team. On 10 June, Burnley announced that he would leave the club at the end of the month when his contract expired.

In July 2022 he signed for Salford City. He was released by the club at the end of the season.

As of March 2024, Nartey worked as a property developer.

In August 2024 after a year away from football, Nartey signed for National League club Barnet. He played only twice for the Bees before picking up an injury and did not play again before being released at the end of the season.

== Personal life ==
Born in England, Nartey is of Ghanaian descent. He attended St. Paul's School, London, leaving at age 16 following his GCSEs. He then studied A-Levels (maths and French) part time over 3 years whilst playing football.

== Career statistics ==
Appearances and goals by club, season and competition
Club	Season	League			FA Cup		League Cup		Other		Total	
Club	Season	Division	Apps	Goals	Apps	Goals	Apps	Goals	Apps	Goals	Apps	Goals
Chelsea U21	2017–18	—			—		—		3 (Note: Appearances in EFL Trophy)	0	3	0
Chelsea U21	2018–19	—			—		—		4	1	4	1
Chelsea U21	Total				—		—		7	1	7	1
Chelsea	2019–20	Premier League	0	0	—		—		—		0	0
Burton Albion (loan)	2019–20	League One	25	0	1	0	2	0	1	0	29	0
Burnley	2020–21	Premier League	0	0	0	0	—		—		0	0
Burnley	2021–22	Premier League	0	0	0	0	0	0	—		0	0
Burnley	Total		0	0	0	0	0	0	—		0	0
Mansfield Town (loan)	2021–22	League Two	3	0	0	0	—		0	0	3	0
Salford City	2022–23	League Two	11	0	0	0	0	0	0	0	11	0
Barnet	2024–25	National League	2	0	0	0	0	0	0	0	2	0
Career total			40	0	1	0	2	0	8	1	51	1
