= Lucas Akins =

Grenadian footballer (born 1989)

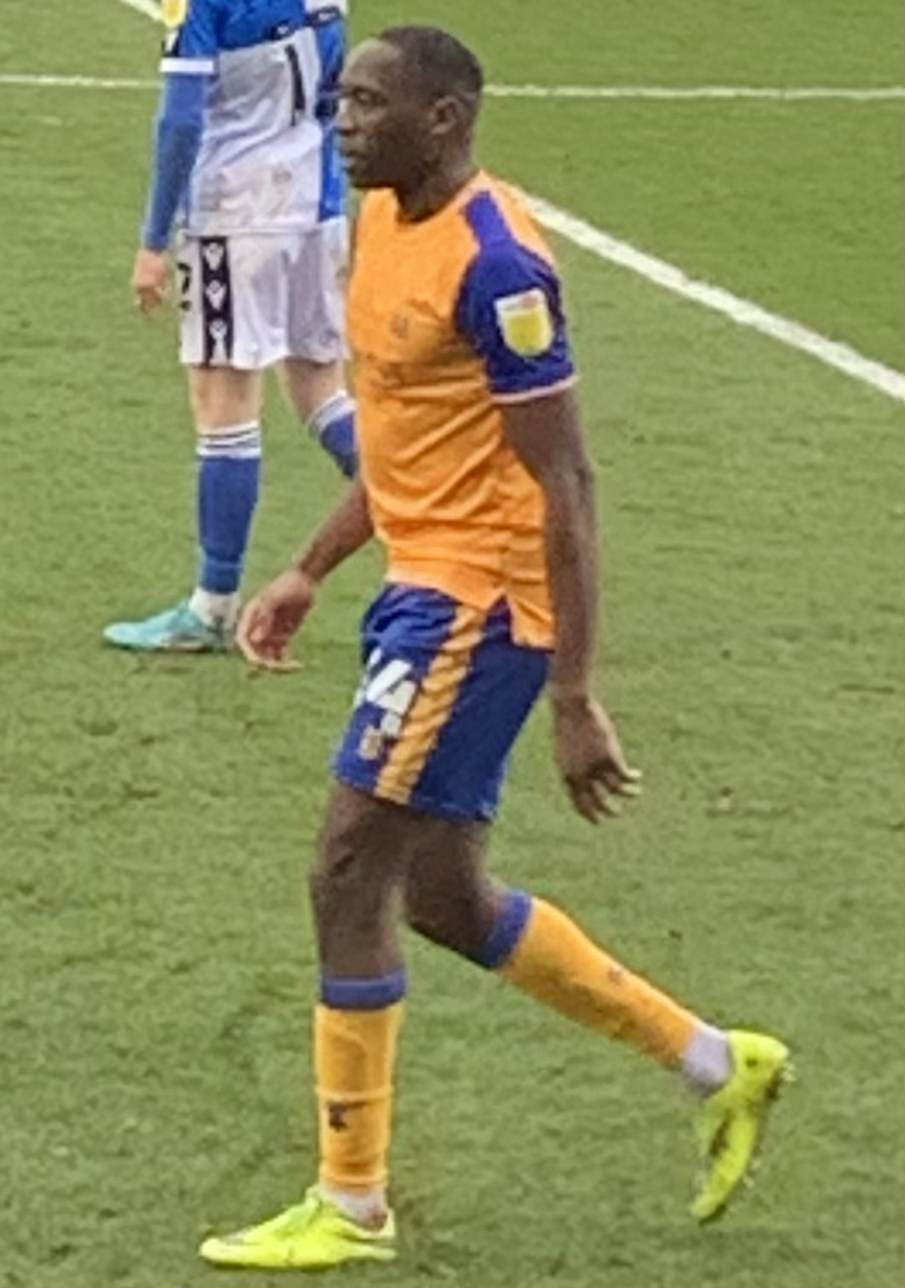
- Akins playing for Mansfield Town in 2022

Personal information
- Full name: Lucas Jordan Jeremiah Akins
- Date of birth: 25 February 1989 (age 37)
- Place of birth: Huddersfield, England
- Height: 5 ft 11 in (1.80 m)
- Positions: Winger; striker

Team information
- Current team: Mansfield Town
- Number: 7

Youth career
- 2005–2007: Huddersfield Town

Senior career*
Years	Team	Apps	(Gls)
2007–2008	Huddersfield Town	5	(0)
2007–2008	→ Northwich Victoria (loan)	10	(1)
2008–2010	Hamilton Academical	11	(0)
2009	→ Partick Thistle (loan)	9	(1)
2010–2012	Tranmere Rovers	77	(7)
2012–2014	Stevenage	77	(13)
2014–2022	Burton Albion	307	(65)
2022–	Mansfield Town	166	(32)

International career
2024–	Grenada	10	(2)
- * Club domestic league appearances and goals as of 11:39, 26 August 2026 (UTC)

Lucas Jordan Jeremiah Akins (born 25 February 1989) is a professional footballer who plays for EFL League One club Mansfield Town. Akins has been deployed in every outfield position during his career, mostly playing as either a winger or striker. Born in England, he represents the Grenada national team.

Akins began his career at Huddersfield Town, progressing through the youth system before making his senior debut in April 2007. He spent three months of the 2007–08 season on loan at Conference Premier club Northwich Victoria and was released by Huddersfield in the summer of 2008. He subsequently joined Scottish Premier League club Hamilton Academical in July 2008, spending the second half of the 2008–09 season on loan to Partick Thistle. Without featuring for Hamilton the following year, he was released upon the expiry of his contract in May 2010.

He signed for League One club Tranmere Rovers ahead of the 2010–11 season, playing regularly across two campaigns before transferring to Stevenage for an undisclosed fee in August 2012. After two years at Stevenage, Akins moved to Burton Albion in July 2014, where he helped the club achieve successive promotions from League Two to the Championship. Over eight seasons he became the club's record appearance-maker (307) and goalscorer (65) in the English Football League. In January 2022, he joined Mansfield Town, contributing to their promotion to League One in the 2023–24 season.

== Early life ==
Akins was born in Huddersfield, West Yorkshire. His mother originated from Grenada and his father from Carriacou. He began taking dance classes, including ballet, jazz, and tap, at the age of four and continued until he chose to pursue a career in football at 16. He later studied sports science at Kirklees College.

== Club career ==
=== Huddersfield Town ===
Akins began his career with his hometown club Huddersfield Town, finishing as the under-18 team's top goalscorer in successive seasons. In April 2007, manager Andy Ritchie invited him to train with the first team following his performances at academy and reserve level. He made his professional debut later that month, coming on as an 87th-minute substitute in a 1–1 draw against Northampton Town at Sixfields. He signed his first professional contract on 2 May 2007, agreeing a one-year deal with the club.

During the opening months of the 2007–08 season, Akins made four substitute appearances for Huddersfield before joining Conference Premier club Northwich Victoria on 23 November 2007 on an initial one-month loan. He debuted the following day in a 1–0 home victory over Rushden & Diamonds, Northwich's first win in 19 matches. After the team remained unbeaten during his initial spell, the loan was extended by a further month, which manager Dino Maamria described as a "massive boost". Akins scored his first professional goal in the next match, a 2–1 away win against rivals Altrincham on 26 December 2007. He made ten appearances, scoring once, before returning to Huddersfield in February 2008, where he did not feature again for the first team. Following Ritchie's departure in April 2008, new manager Stan Ternent informed Akins that he would not be offered a contract extension, and he was released when his contract expired in June.

=== Hamilton Academical ===
In July 2008, Akins went on trial with newly promoted Scottish Premier League club Hamilton Academical, appearing in several pre-season matches over a two-week period. He impressed manager Billy Reid and signed a two-year contract on 22 July 2008. His competitive debut came in the opening match of the 2008–09 season, coming on as a 67th-minute substitute in a 3–1 home victory over Dundee United at New Douglas Park. Akins featured predominantly as a substitute during the first half of the season, with seven of his 13 appearances coming from the substitutes' bench.

In January 2009, Reid indicated his intention to loan out Akins to gain first-team experience, and he subsequently joined Scottish First Division club Partick Thistle for the remainder of the 2008–09 season. Akins made his debut a day later as a substitute in a 2–2 away draw with Queen of the South. After a two-month absence, he returned as a second-half substitute in a 1–0 home defeat to Clyde in March 2009. He featured regularly for Partick thereafter, making nine appearances and scoring once in a 1–0 win against Greenock Morton on 18 April 2009. At the end of the loan, he returned to Hamilton but did not play during the 2009–10 season, and he was released in May 2010.

=== Tranmere Rovers ===
Following his release by Hamilton, Akins went on trial with Rochdale in July 2010, playing in the club's 2–0 pre-season friendly victory against Rossendale United. No transfer materialised, but Akins expressed gratitude to Rochdale manager Keith Hill for including him on the club's pre-season trip to Marbella, which enabled him to regain fitness. Later that month, he undertook a two-week trial with League One club Tranmere Rovers, which led to a one-year contract on 24 August 2010. He made his Tranmere debut the same day, appearing as an 82nd-minute substitute in a 3–1 League Cup defeat to Swansea City. Akins established himself as a regular first-team player that season, making 38 appearances and scoring two goals, both in a 4–0 win over Exeter City on 25 April 2011. He signed a one-year contract extension, with the option of a further year, on 29 July 2011, with manager Les Parry noting that he was pleased to retain a player whose work ethic had been "fantastic".

Akins scored his first goal of the 2011–12 season on 13 September 2011 with a low right-footed shot in a 2–1 home defeat to Carlisle United. A month later, he scored both goals in a 2–0 victory over Hartlepool United at Victoria Park. He made 49 appearances during the season, scoring five goals, as Tranmere finished in mid-table. Following the season, the club exercised the option to extend his contract for a further year. Across his two seasons at Tranmere, Akins made 87 appearances in all competitions, scoring seven goals.

=== Stevenage ===
Despite Tranmere activating the automatic contract extension clause at the end of the 2011–12 season, Akins submitted a transfer request in July 2012 amid speculation linking him with League One club Stevenage. Tranmere rejected the request, with manager Ronnie Moore stating the club had no intention of selling him. However, on 2 August 2012, he joined Stevenage on a three-year contract for an undisclosed fee. Akins made his debut in the club's opening match of the 2012–13 season, appearing as a 71st-minute substitute in a 3–1 League Cup victory over AFC Wimbledon. He scored the only goal on his first start in a 1–0 away win over Leyton Orient on 21 August. Akins featured in all 46 of Stevenage's league matches and four cup games, finishing the season as the club's top goalscorer with ten goals.

=== Burton Albion ===
Despite having signed an automatic 12-month contract with Stevenage on 20 May 2014, Akins signed for League Two club Burton Albion on a two-year contract on 18 June 2014. He made his debut in the club's opening match of the 2014–15 season, scoring the only goal in a 1–0 away victory at Oxford United. Akins scored twice in Burton's 2–1 win at Morecambe on 18 April 2015, a result that secured the club's first-ever promotion to League One. He made 38 appearances and was Burton's top goalscorer with nine goals as the club won the League Two title. Akins opened the 2015–16 season by scoring the winning goal in Burton's first League One match, a 2–1 victory against Scunthorpe United at the Pirelli Stadium. He recorded his first career hat-trick in a 3–0 away win at Colchester United on 23 April 2016. Burton achieved back-to-back promotions into the Championship after finishing in second in League One, with Akins scoring 12 goals in 48 appearances. Out of contract at the end of the season, he signed a new two-year deal on 30 June 2016, having been offered a renewal in May.

For the third consecutive season, Akins scored in Burton's opening match, registering a first-half goal away at Nottingham Forest in an eventual 4–3 defeat to begin the 2016–17 season. He scored five times in 41 appearances across a season in which he was deployed as a wing-back, winger and forward, with Burton finishing 20th in their first Championship season to avoid relegation. Akins signed a two-year contract extension on 25 April 2017. He made 46 appearances and scored six goals during the 2017–18 season as Burton were relegated to League One, and was named the club's Player of the Year in May 2018. Akins signed a three-year extension on 11 January 2019, amid reported transfer interest from other clubs, with manager Nigel Clough describing him as "one of the best signings this club has ever made". He scored a career-high 14 goals in 56 appearances during the 2018–19 season, finishing as the club's joint-top goalscorer and earning Burton's Player of the Year for a second consecutive season.

Akins scored 11 goals in 45 appearances during the 2019–20 season, including his 50th goal for the club in a 2–2 draw with Doncaster Rovers on 2 November 2019. He attracted transfer interest from Mansfield Town in January 2021, managed by Clough, but remained at Burton, making 49 appearances and scoring 11 goals in League One during the 2020–21 season. Having scored three goals in 23 appearances during the first half of the 2021–22 season, he submitted a transfer request in January 2022, with Burton permitting his departure in recognition of his service to the club. Akins left Burton holding the club record for Football League appearances (307) and goals (65).

=== Mansfield Town ===
Akins joined League Two club Mansfield Town on a two-and-a-half-year contract on 20 January 2022 for an undisclosed fee, reuniting with manager Nigel Clough, who had previously managed him at Burton. He made his debut two days later in a 3–1 away victory at Barrow and scored his first goal in a 2–0 victory over Crawley Town on 23 April 2022. He made 22 appearances during the remainder of that season, including three play-off matches as Mansfield were defeated 3–0 by Port Vale at Wembley Stadium in the final on 28 May 2022. Akins scored nine goals in 44 appearances during the 2022–23 season, and 14 goals in 49 appearances in the 2023–24 season as Mansfield earned automatic promotion, finishing third in League Two. He signed a new one-year contract on 6 June 2024 and made 39 appearances, scoring four goals, as Mansfield finished 17th in League One.

After serving six months of his 14-month sentence, Akins returned to Mansfield in October 2025, with Clough stating that he was being reintegrated into the squad and would be given time to return to playing, while acknowledging that he would remain conscious of the impact of the incident on the victim's family. He returned to competitive football later that month, making 34 appearances and scoring 10 goals during the 2025–26 season. He signed a contract extension on 19 May 2026.

== International career ==
Akins was first called up to the Grenada national team in March 2020, qualifying through his ancestry, although the matches were cancelled due to the COVID-19 pandemic. He received another call-up for two 2026 World Cup qualification matches in June 2024, making his international debut in a 2–2 draw against Trinidad and Tobago on 5 June 2024. He scored his first international goal in his third appearance, a 2–0 CONCACAF Nations League win over Saint Martin on 6 September 2024.

== Style of play ==
Akins began his career as a striker before being deployed as a winger. He is primarily right-footed but comfortable using his left. While at Burton Albion, he was used in every outfield position, with his versatility regarded as a strength. During the 2017–18 season, he was mainly utilised as a right wing-back, with his work rate praised in one of football's most physically demanding roles.

== Personal life ==
Akins was involved in a car crash in Huddersfield on 17 March 2022, which killed cyclist Adrian Daniel. He admitted causing death by careless or inconsiderate driving at Leeds Crown Court on 4 March 2025. Daniel's wife criticised Akins for not pleading guilty at the first opportunity, but stated she did not want him to be imprisoned. Akins was sentenced to 14 months in prison on 24 April 2025, serving seven months in custody and seven months on licence, and was also banned from driving for one year.

== Career statistics ==
=== Club ===
As of match played 22 August 2026

Appearances and goals by club, season and competition
Club	Season	League			National cup (Note: Includes FA Cup, Scottish Cup)		League cup (Note: Includes EFL Cup, Scottish League Cup)		Other		Total	
Club	Season	Division	Apps	Goals	Apps	Goals	Apps	Goals	Apps	Goals	Apps	Goals
Huddersfield Town	2006–07	League One	2	0	0	0	0	0	0	0	2	0
Huddersfield Town	2007–08	League One	3	0	0	0	0	0	1 (Note: Appearance(s) in Football League Trophy)	0	4	0
Huddersfield Town	Total		5	0	0	0	0	0	1	0	6	0
Northwich Victoria (loan)	2007–08	Conference Premier	10	1	0	0	—		0	0	10	1
Hamilton Academical	2008–09	Scottish Premier League	11	0	0	0	2	0	0	0	13	0
Hamilton Academical	2009–10	Scottish Premier League	0	0	0	0	0	0	0	0	0	0
Hamilton Academical	Total		11	0	0	0	2	0	0	0	13	0
Partick Thistle (loan)	2008–09	Scottish First Division	9	1	0	0	0	0	0	0	9	1
Tranmere Rovers	2010–11	League One	33	2	1	0	1	0	3	0	38	2
Tranmere Rovers	2011–12	League One	44	5	1	0	1	0	3	0	49	5
Tranmere Rovers	Total		77	7	2	0	2	0	6	0	87	7
Stevenage	2012–13	League One	46	10	1	0	2	0	0	0	49	10
Stevenage	2013–14	League One	31	3	3	1	0	0	2	1	36	5
Stevenage	Total		77	13	4	1	2	0	2	1	85	15
Burton Albion	2014–15	League Two	35	9	1	0	1	0	1	0	38	9
Burton Albion	2015–16	League One	44	12	1	0	2	0	1	0	48	12
Burton Albion	2016–17	Championship	38	5	1	0	2	0	0	0	41	5
Burton Albion	2017–18	Championship	42	5	1	0	3	1	0	0	46	6
Burton Albion	2018–19	League One	46	13	1	0	7	1	2 (Note: Appearance(s) in EFL Trophy)	0	56	14
Burton Albion	2019–20	League One	35	9	4	1	3	0	3	1	45	11
Burton Albion	2020–21	League One	45	9	1	0	2	1	1	1	49	11
Burton Albion	2021–22	League One	22	3	0	0	1	0	0	0	23	3
Burton Albion	Total		307	65	10	1	21	3	8	2	346	71
Mansfield Town	2021–22	League Two	19	1	—		—		3 (Note: Appearances in 2022 League Two play-offs)	0	22	1
Mansfield Town	2022–23	League Two	39	8	2	0	0	0	3	1	44	9
Mansfield Town	2023–24	League Two	45	12	0	0	3	2	1	0	49	14
Mansfield Town	2024–25	League One	34	2	3	1	0	0	2	1	39	4
Mansfield Town	2025–26	League One	27	9	5	1	0	0	2	0	34	10
Mansfield Town	2026–27	League One	2	0	0	0	1	0	1	0	4	0
Mansfield Town	Total		166	32	10	2	4	2	12	2	192	38
Career total			662	119	26	4	31	5	29	5	748	133

=== International ===
As of match played 15 May 2026

Appearances and goals by national team and year
National team	Year	Apps	Goals
Grenada	2024	6	2
Grenada	2025	1	0
Grenada	2026	3	0
Total		10	2

Scores and results list Grenada's goal tally first, score column indicates score after each Akins goal.

No.	Date	Venue	Opponent	Score	Result	Competition
1.	6 September 2024	Kirani James Athletic Stadium, St. George's, Grenada	Saint Martin	1–0	2–0	2024–25 CONCACAF Nations League
2.	9 September 2024	Kirani James Athletic Stadium, St. George's, Grenada	Saint Lucia	1–2	1–2	2024–25 CONCACAF Nations League

== Honours ==
Burton Albion

- Football League Two: 2014–15

Mansfield Town

- EFL League Two third-place promotion: 2023–24

Individual

- Burton Albion Player of the Year: 2017–18, 2018–19
