= Kieran O'Hara =

Footballer (born 1996)

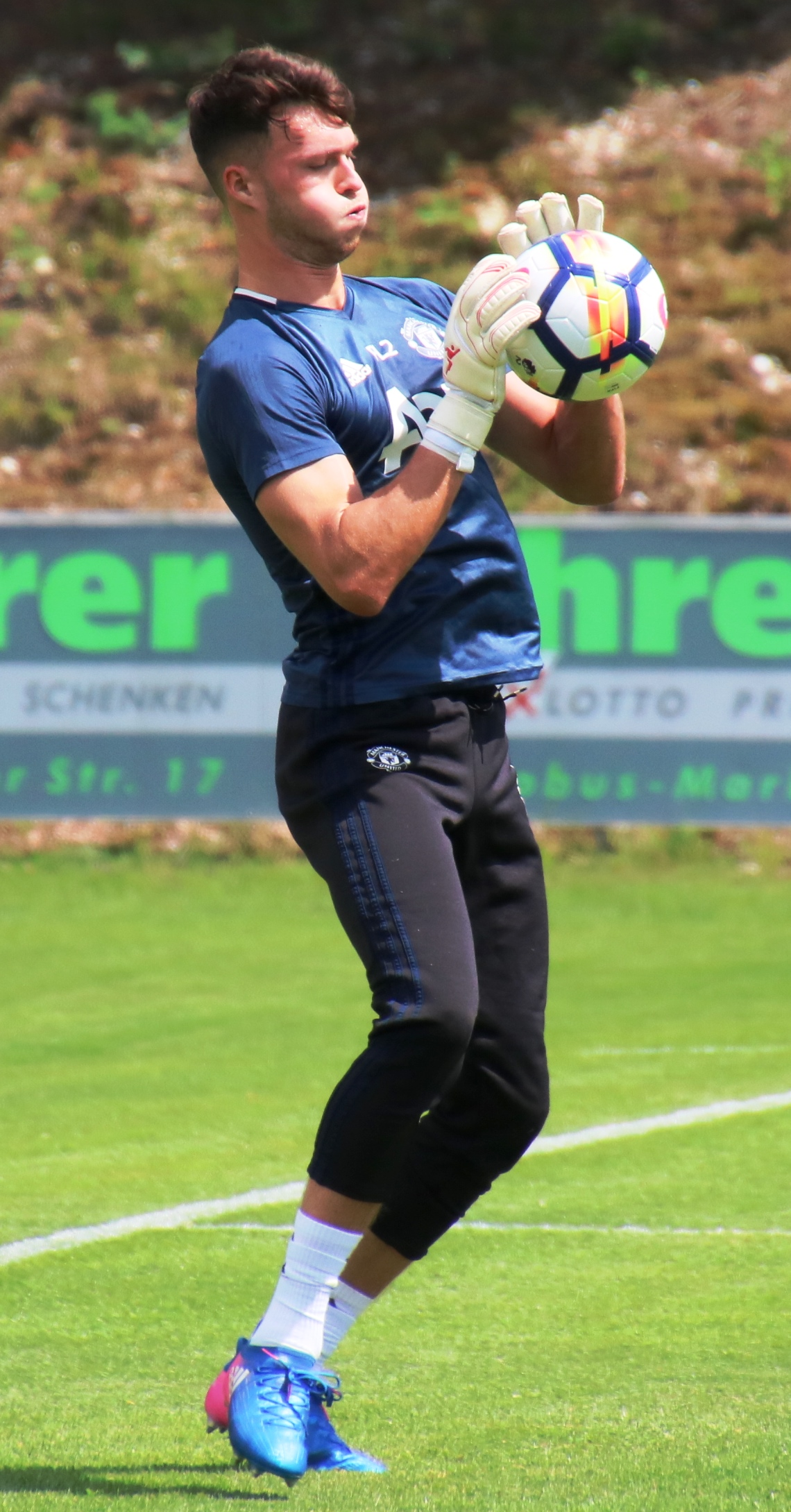
- Kieran O'Hara training ahead of the match against FC Liefering on 11 July 2017.

Personal information
- Full name: Kieran Michael O'Hara
- Date of birth: 22 April 1996 (age 30)
- Place of birth: Manchester, England
- Height: 6 ft 3 in (1.91 m)
- Position: Goalkeeper

Team information
- Current team: Dundee
- Number: 13

Youth career
- –2012: Urmston Town
- 2012–2014: Manchester United

Senior career*
Years	Team	Apps	(Gls)
2014–2020	Manchester United	0	(0)
2013–2014	→ Trafford (loan)	30	(0)
2015	→ AFC Fylde (loan)	0	(0)
2015	→ Morecambe (loan)	0	(0)
2015	→ Stockport County (loan)	1	(0)
2016	→ Morecambe (loan)	5	(0)
2018–2019	→ Macclesfield Town (loan)	42	(0)
2019–2020	→ Burton Albion (loan)	41	(0)
2020–2022	Burton Albion	19	(0)
2021	→ Scunthorpe United (loan)	3	(0)
2022	Fleetwood Town	4	(0)
2022–2023	Colchester United	27	(0)
2023–2025	Kilmarnock	22	(0)
2025–	Dundee	4	(0)

International career^{‡}
2017–2018	Republic of Ireland U21	9	(0)
2019	Republic of Ireland	2	(0)
- * Club domestic league appearances and goals as of 17 May 2026 ‡ National team caps and goals as of 11:58, 29 August 2024 (UTC)

Kieran Michael O'Hara (born 22 April 1996) is a professional footballer who plays as a goalkeeper for Scottish Premiership club Dundee. Born in England, he plays for the Republic of Ireland national team at international level.

== Club career ==
=== Urmston Town ===
Born in Manchester, O'Hara began his career with local club Urmston Town, while attending Ashton-on-Mersey School and Sixth Form.

=== Manchester United ===
He then joined Manchester United on 1 July 2012, having represented the club at the Future Cup earlier in the year. Reaching the final before losing to Ajax on penalties, the goalkeeper signed on to become an Under-17 Academy student, working with Under-18 coach Paul McGuinness.

==== Loan moves ====
His chances were limited in his first season with the youth team, and he was soon given a work-experience loan with Trafford throughout the 2013–14 season. Upon his return, and having faced his first taste of senior football, O'Hara was promoted to the Under-21 squad.

Despite his continued difficulty in breaking into the starting XI, with Joel Castro Pereira the preferred goalkeeper, O'Hara signed a professional deal with the Reds in the summer of 2014.

Making a single appearance for the Under-21s, he soon faced further loan spells in a bid to impress the coaching staff at Old Trafford. After a one-month loan with Conference North title-contenders AFC Fylde, O'Hara was given his first opportunity for United in the final game of the Under-21 Premier League season. Following 15 games as an unused substitute, he completed 90 minutes in a 3–1 defeat to Manchester City, with his side already crowned league champions.

O'Hara opted for senior football once more during the 2015–16 season, and completed a deadline day move to League Two club Morecambe on a one-month loan in the summer. He later faced a one-month loan spell with National League North club Stockport County in November, before returning to Morecambe for the remainder of the season on 12 January.

Having failed to make a competitive appearance in his first spell with the Shrimps, O'Hara made his professional debut in a 3–1 defeat to league leaders Northampton Town on 23 January 2016.

On 15 August 2018, O'Hara joined League Two side Macclesfield Town on loan for the 2018–19 season. O'Hara was Macclesfield's first-choice goalkeeper for the 2018–19 season, making 37 appearances in the league, as well as a further five in cup competitions, including Macclesfield's 8–0 loss to West Ham United in the third round of the EFL Cup. A draw with Cambridge United saw Macclesfield remain in the Football League, helped greatly by O'Hara's performances in goal; his form over the course of the season saw him named as Macclesfield's Player of the Year, Players' Player of the Year and Young Player of the Year.

For the 2019–20 season, O'Hara joined League One side Burton Albion on loan. Upon his return to Manchester United, he was released by the club on 30 June 2020.

=== Burton Albion ===
On 11 September 2020, O'Hara signed with Burton Albion for a two-year deal.

On 20 November 2021, O'Hara joined League Two side Scunthorpe United on an emergency seven-day loan deal following an injury to first-team goalkeeper Rory Watson. On 26 November 2021, the loan was extended by a further seven days.

=== Fleetwood Town ===
On 1 February 2022, O'Hara joined fellow League One side Fleetwood Town after leaving Burton Albion by mutual consent. O'Hara was released by the club at the end of the season.

=== Colchester United ===
After leaving Fleetwood Town, O'Hara signed a one-year deal with League Two side Colchester United.

=== Kilmarnock ===
After one season at Colchester United, O'Hara moved to Scotland by joining Kilmarnock, signing a one-year deal. O'Hara was the club's second choice goalkeeper behind Will Dennis until Dennis suffered an injury in the 44th minutes against Hibernian on 16 September 2023, prompting O'Hara to make his Kilmarnock debut, in a 2–2 draw.

=== Dundee ===
On 16 September 2025, O’Hara joined Scottish Premiership club Dundee on a permanent deal until the end of the season. On 2 May 2026, O'Hara made his first team debut for Dundee off the bench at home to St Mirren after an injury to Jon McCracken, and held onto a clean sheet in an important six-pointer. The following week, O'Hara made his first start for the Dee where he kept another clean sheet that included saving a penalty kick from Livingston in a game which secured Dundee's Scottish Premiership status.

== Career statistics ==
=== Club ===
As of match played 25 July 2026

Appearances and goals by club, season and competition
Club	Season	League			National cup		League cup		Other		Total	
Club	Season	Division	Apps	Goals	Apps	Goals	Apps	Goals	Apps	Goals	Apps	Goals
Manchester United	2014–15	Premier League	0	0	0	0	0	0	0	0	0	0
Manchester United	2016–17	Premier League	0	0	0	0	0	0	0	0	0	0
Manchester United	2017–18	Premier League	0	0	0	0	0	0	0	0	0	0
Manchester United	2018–19	Premier League	0	0	0	0	0	0	0	0	0	0
Manchester United	Total		0	0	0	0	0	0	0	0	0	0
Morecambe (loan)	2015–16	League Two	0	0	0	0	0	0	0	0	0	0
Stockport County (loan)	2015–16	National League North	1	0	0	0	—		—		1	0
Morecambe (loan)	2015–16	League Two	5	0	0	0	0	0	0	0	5	0
Macclesfield Town (loan)	2018–19	League Two	37	0	1	0	2	0	2 (Note: Games in the EFL Trophy)	0	42	0
Burton Albion (loan)	2019–20	League One	33	0	4	0	4	0	1	0	42	0
Burton Albion	2020–21	League One	17	0	1	0	0	0	1	0	19	0
Burton Albion	2021–22	League One	0	0	0	0	0	0	0	0	0	0
Burton Albion	Total		17	0	1	0	0	0	1	0	19	0
Scunthorpe United (loan)	2021–22	League Two	3	0	0	0	0	0	0	0	3	0
Fleetwood Town	2021–22	League One	4	0	0	0	0	0	0	0	4	0
Colchester United	2022–23	League Two	27	0	1	0	1	0	2	0	31	0
Kilmarnock	2023–24	Scottish Premiership	3	0	1	0	0	0	2 (Note: Games in the Scottish Challenge Cup)	0	6	0
Kilmarnock	2024–25	Scottish Premiership	19	0	1	0	1	0	0	0	21	0
Kilmarnock	Total		22	0	2	0	1	0	2	0	27	0
Dundee	2025–26	Scottish Premiership	4	0	0	0	0	0	0	0	4	0
Dundee	2026–27	Scottish Premiership	0	0	0	0	3	0	0	0	3	0
Dundee	Total		4	0	0	0	3	0	0	0	7	0
Dundee B	2025–26	—			—		—		2 (Note: Appearances in the Scottish Challenge Cup)	0	2	0
Career total			153	0	9	0	11	0	10	0	183	0

=== International ===
As of match played 12 November 2020

Appearances and goals by national team and year
National team	Year	Apps	Goals
Republic of Ireland	2019	2	0
Total		2	0

== International career ==
O'Hara qualifies to play for the Republic of Ireland through his paternal grandparents, who are from Galway.

He was called up by the Irish senior national team in March 2019. He made his senior international debut on 10 September 2019, coming on for another debutant Mark Travers in a 3–1 win over Bulgaria at the Aviva Stadium. He made his full debut against New Zealand starting in a friendly on 14 November 2019.
