= Jakub Niemczyk =

Polish footballer (born 2004)

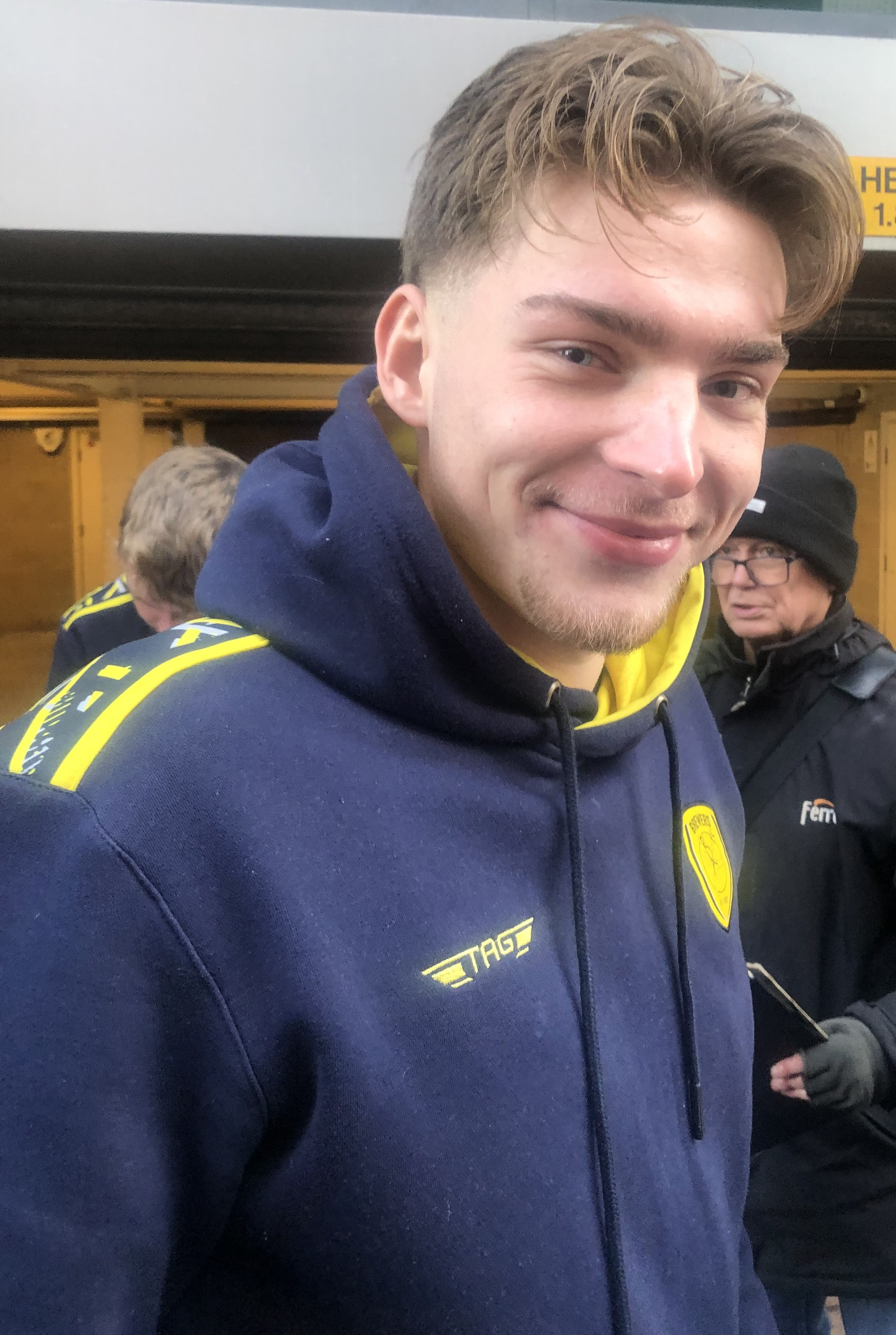
- Jakub Niemczyk in 2024.

Personal information
- Full name: Jakub Michał Niemczyk
- Date of birth: 22 January 2004 (age 22)
- Place of birth: Zielona Góra, Poland
- Position: Forward

Team information
- Current team: Burton Albion
- Number: 35

Youth career
- 2013–2020: Burton Albion

Senior career*
Years	Team	Apps	(Gls)
2020–	Burton Albion	0	(0)
- * Club domestic league appearances and goals as of 19:48, 8 September 2020 (UTC)

Jakub Michał Niemczyk (born 22 January 2004) is a Polish footballer who plays as a forward for EFL League One club Burton Albion.

== Career statistics ==
As of 11 November 2021

Appearances and goals by club, season and competition
Club	Season	League			National Cup		League Cup		Other		Total	
Club	Season	Division	Apps	Goals	Apps	Goals	Apps	Goals	Apps	Goals	Apps	Goals
Burton Albion	2020–21	League One	0	0	0	0	0	0	2 (Note: Appearance(s) in the EFL Trophy)	0	2	0
Burton Albion	2021–22	League One	0	0	0	0	0	0	0	0	0	0
Career total			0	0	0	0	0	0	2	0	2	0
