= Owen Gallacher =

English footballer (born 1999)

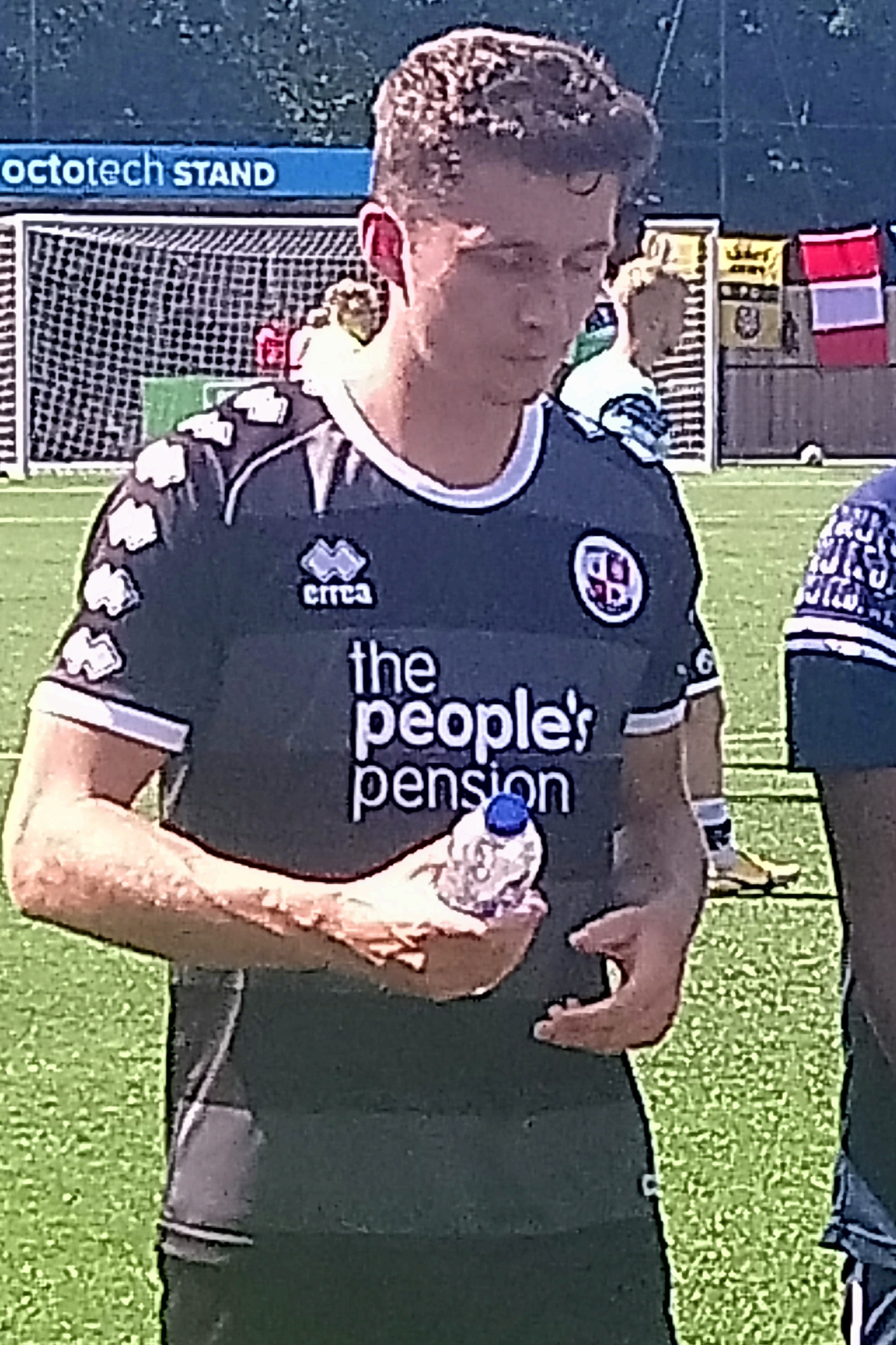
- Gallagher with Crawley Town in July 2021

Personal information
- Full name: Owen John Gallacher
- Date of birth: 6 April 1999 (age 27)
- Place of birth: Newcastle, England
- Positions: Left-back; winger

Team information
- Current team: Stockton Town

Youth career
- Newcastle United
- 2018–2019: Nottingham Forest

Senior career*
Years	Team	Apps	(Gls)
2019–2020	Nottingham Forest	0	(0)
2020	→ Harrogate Town (loan)	0	(0)
2020–2021	Burton Albion	9	(0)
2021–2023	Crawley Town	3	(0)
2022	→ Gateshead (loan)	11	(0)
2023	Grimsby Town	3	(0)
2023–2024	Spennymoor Town	9	(0)
2024–	Stockton Town	44	(1)

International career
2014	Scotland U16		
2016	Scotland U19		
- * Club domestic league appearances and goals as of 19:32, 19 December 2025 (UTC)

Owen John Gallacher (born 6 April 1999) is a professional footballer who plays for Stockton Town as a left-back and winger.

Gallacher is a product of the youth academies at Newcastle United and Nottingham Forest and turned professional with the latter in 2019. Having spent a spell on loan with Harrogate Town he signed a permanent deal with Burton Albion the following season before joining Crawley Town in 2021. He has since played for Gateshead and Grimsby Town, before returning to non-league with Spennymoor Town and Stockton Town.

Born in England, he represented Scotland at youth international level.

== Club career ==
=== Early career ===
Born in Newcastle, Gallacher spent his early career with the youth teams of Newcastle United and Nottingham Forest, before moving on loan to Harrogate Town in January 2020, where he made his senior debut in the FA Trophy.

=== Burton Albion ===
After leaving Nottingham Forest, he signed a short-term contract with Burton Albion in September 2020 following a trial period. On 8 January 2021, Gallacher signed a contract extension to remain at the club for the remainder of the 2020–21 season.

On 12 May 2021 it was announced that he would be one of 12 players leaving Burton at the end of the season.

=== Crawley Town ===
Following his release from Burton Albion, Gallacher signed for League Two club Crawley Town on 1 July 2021 on a two-year deal with the option for a further year.

On 27 August 2022 Gallacher joined National League club Gateshead on a loan deal until 31 December 2022.

He was released by Crawley in January 2023.

=== Grimsby Town ===
He signed for Grimsby Town on 3 February 2023.

On 9 May 2023, it was announced that Gallacher would not be retained for the 2023–24 season and would be leaving the club when his contract expires on 30 June.

=== Spennymoor Town ===
On 1 July 2023, Gallacher signed for National League North side Spennymoor Town. In April 2024, he departed the club having had his contract terminated by mutual consent.

=== Stockton Town ===
On 5 July 2024, Gallacher signed for the Northern Premier League Premier Division side Stockton Town. Gallacher scored his first goal for the club on 5 April, 2025, in a home game against Worksop Town.

== International career ==
Gallacher represented Scotland at under-16 and under-19 youth levels.

== Career statistics ==
As of match played 19 December 2025

Appearances and goals by club, season and competition
Club	Season	League			FA Cup		EFL Cup		Other		Total	
Club	Season	Division	Apps	Goals	Apps	Goals	Apps	Goals	Apps	Goals	Apps	Goals
Newcastle United U21	2017–18	—			—		—		1 (Note: Appearance(s) in EFL Trophy)	0	1	0
Nottingham Forest	2019–20	Championship	0	0	0	0	0	0	0	0	0	0
Harrogate Town (loan)	2019–20	National League	0	0	0	0	—		2 (Note: Appearance(s) in FA Trophy)	0	2	0
Burton Albion	2020–21	League One	9	0	0	0	1	0	2	0	12	0
Crawley Town	2021–22	League Two	3	0	0	0	0	0	2	0	5	0
Crawley Town	2022–23	League Two	0	0	0	0	0	0	0	0	0	0
Crawley Town	Total		3	0	0	0	0	0	2	0	5	0
Gateshead (loan)	2022–23	National League	11	0	2	0	—		0	0	13	0
Grimsby Town	2022–23	League Two	3	0	0	0	0	0	0	0	3	0
Spennymoor Town	2023–24	National League North	9	0	1	0	—		0	0	10	0
Stockton Town	2024–25	NPL Premier Division	35	1	3	0	—		5 (Note: 3 appearances in FA Trophy, 2 appearances in Durham Challenge Cup)	0	24	1
Stockton Town	2025–26	NPL Premier Division	8	0	0	0	—		2 (Note: 2 appearances in Durham Challenge Cup)	0	8	0
Stockton Town	Total		44	1	3	0	0	0	7	0	30	1
Career total			79	1	6	0	1	0	15	0	79	1
