= Ben Hart (footballer, born 2000) =

English association football player

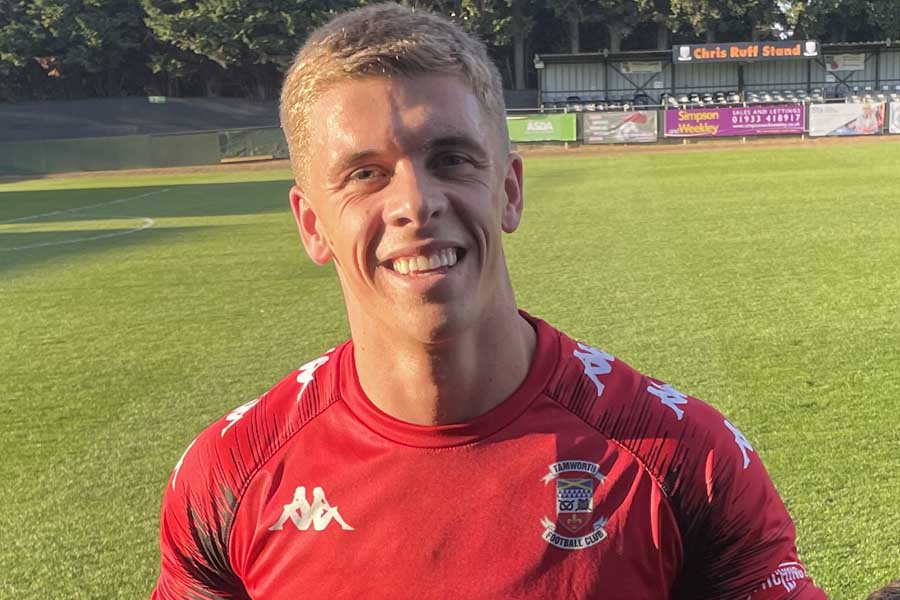
- Hart in October 2022

Personal information
- Full name: Benjamin Ethan Hart
- Date of birth: 26 September 2000 (age 26)
- Place of birth: Burton upon Trent, England
- Height: 1.80 m (5 ft 11 in)
- Position: Defender

Team information
- Current team: Kettering Town

Youth career
- –2018: Burton Albion

Senior career*
Years	Team	Apps	(Gls)
2018–2021	Burton Albion	3	(0)
2018–2019	→ Kidsgrove Athletic (loan)	9	(0)
2019	→ Kidsgrove Athletic (loan)	7	(0)
2020	→ Tamworth (loan)	2	(0)
2020	→ Tamworth (loan)	3	(0)
2020	→ Redditch United (loan)	0	(0)
2021–	Tamworth	8	(0)
- * Club domestic league appearances and goals as of 17:00, 23 April 2022 (UTC)

Benjamin Ethan Hart (born 26 September 2000) is an English footballer who plays for side CoalvilleTown, where he plays as a defender.

== Playing career ==
=== Burton Albion ===
Hart began his career with the Burton Albion youth system. On 12 December 2018, Hart was sent on a work experience loan to Kidsgrove Athletic for one month which lasted until 9 January 2019.

Ben returned to Burton Albion following the loan spell and on 22 May 2019 was rewarded with a six-month professional contract. On 20 September 2019, Ben rejoined Northern Premier League Division One South East side Kidsgrove Athletic on a one-month loan deal. The loan was extended on 23 October 2019, the loan was due to run until 26 December 2019.

Hart returned slightly early to Burton Albion, and made his League One debut on 21 December 2019, coming on as a 92nd-minute substitute for Ryan Edwards in a 3–1 home victory over Rochdale.

Ben's contract was extended on 30 December 2019 until the end of the 2019–20 season.

On 1 February 2020, it was announced that Hart had joined Southern League Premier Division Central side Tamworth on a one-month loan deal. However the deal was only made official by Tamworth on 14 February 2020.

Hart re-signed on loan with Southern League Premier Division Central side Tamworth on 6 October 2020, he was joined on the same day by his Burton Albion teammate Tom Armitage.

Hart signed for fellow Southern League Premier Division Central side Redditch United on 21 December 2020, but failed to make a single appearance following the curtailment of the season.

On 12 May 2021 it was announced that he would be one of 12 players leaving Burton at the end of the season.

=== Tamworth ===
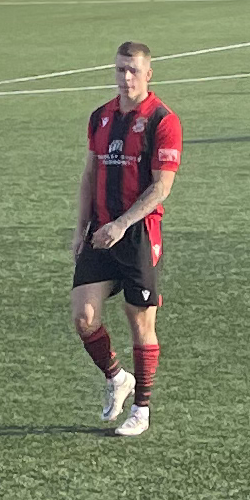
Hart playing for Tamworth in October 2021.

Following his release from Burton Albion, Hart re-signed for Tamworth on a permanent deal on 28 May 2021. Hart appeared for the first time for Tamworth on 21 August 2021, as Tamworth demolished Lowestoft Town 6–1 in a Southern League Premier Division Central home fixture, Hart was replaced on the 76th minute by Aram Soleman.

Hart's season was prematurely ended on 8 January 2022 in a Southern League Premier Division Central home fixture against Royston Town. Hart suffered a double break in his ankle and was replaced on the 19th minute by Jack Thomas. Tamworth won the match 2–0.

On 17 June 2022, it was confirmed via a club newsletter that Hart would return to pre-season with Tamworth for the 2022–23 season. On 2 August 2022, Tamworth confirmed that following an impressive showing in pre-season, Hart had signed a deal to remain with the club for the 2022–23 season.

== Career statistics ==
=== Club ===
As of match played 23 April 2022

Appearances and goals by club, season and competition
Club	Season	League			National Cup		League Cup		Other		Total	
Club	Season	Division	Apps	Goals	Apps	Goals	Apps	Goals	Apps	Goals	Apps	Goals
Burton Albion	2018–19	League One	0	0	0	0	0	0	0	0	0	0
Kidsgrove Athletic (loan)	2018–19	Northern Premier League Division One West	—		—		—		—		—	
Burton Albion	2019–20	League One	0	0	0	0	0	0	0	0	0	0
Kidsgrove Athletic (loan)	2019–20	Northern Premier League Division One South East	7	0	2	0	—		4 (Note: Two appearances in FA Trophy) (Note: Two appearances in Integro League Cup)	0	13	0
Burton Albion	2019–20	League One	3	0	0	0	0	0	0	0	3	0
Tamworth (loan)	2019–20	Southern League Premier Central	2	0	0	0	—		0	0	2	0
Burton Albion	2020–21	League One	0	0	0	0	0	0	0	0	0	0
Tamworth (loan)	2020–21	Southern League Premier Central	3	0	0	0	—		0	0	3	0
Redditch United (loan)	2020–21	Southern League Premier Central	0	0	0	0	—		0	0	0	0
Tamworth	2021–22	Southern League Premier Central	8	0	3	0	—		2 (Note: Two appearances in FA Trophy)	0	13	0
Tamworth	2022–23	Southern League Premier Central	0	0	0	0	—		0	0	0	0
Career total			23	0	5	0	0	0	6	0	34	0
