= Kieran Wallace =

English footballer (born 1995)

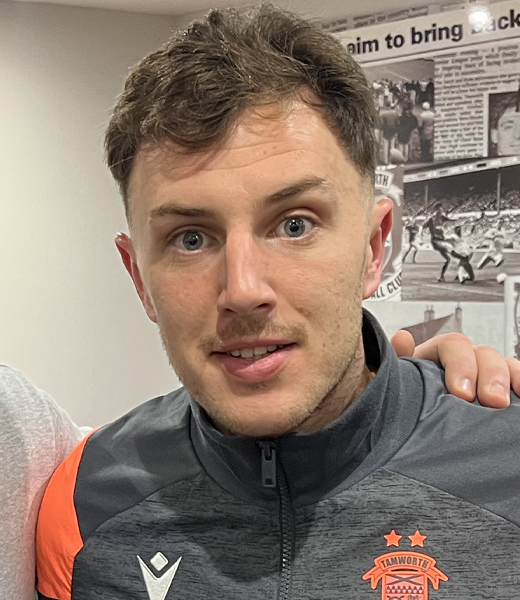
- Wallace in 2024

Personal information
- Full name: Kieran Neil Wallace
- Date of birth: 26 January 1995 (age 31)
- Place of birth: Nottingham, England
- Height: 6 ft 1 in (1.86 m)
- Position: Midfielder

Team information
- Current team: Alfreton Town
- Number: 15

Youth career
- 2004–2013: Nottingham Forest

Senior career*
Years	Team	Apps	(Gls)
2013–2014	Nottingham Forest	0	(0)
2014	Ilkeston	17	(1)
2014–2017	Sheffield United	15	(0)
2015	→ Lincoln City (loan)	6	(0)
2016–2017	→ Fleetwood Town (loan)	0	(0)
2017–2018	Matlock Town	30	(2)
2018–2022	Burton Albion	60	(2)
2021–2022	→ York City (loan)	4	(0)
2022–2023	Mansfield Town	47	(0)
2023–2025	Hartlepool United	21	(0)
2024	→ Tamworth (loan)	6	(0)
2025	→ Peterborough Sports (loan)	4	(0)
2025–	Alfreton Town	8	(1)

International career
2011	England U16	6	(0)
2011–2012	England U17	7	(0)
- * Club domestic league appearances and goals as of 22:51, 21 March 2026 (UTC)

Kieran Neil Wallace (born 26 January 1995) is an English footballer who plays as a midfielder for Alfreton Town.

Wallace came through the ranks at Nottingham Forest. After being released by Forest in 2014, Wallace had a short spell at Ilkeston. He then moved to Sheffield United where he would make 23 appearances in total. After leaving Sheffield United in 2017, Wallace spent one season with Matlock which granted him a move to League One club Burton Albion. He spent three seasons with Burton before moving to Mansfield Town in 2022. In 2023, Wallace signed for National League club Hartlepool United. He has also represented England at youth level.

== Club career ==
=== Nottingham Forest ===
Wallace started his career with Nottingham Forest before joining Ilkeston in summer 2014 on a non-contract basis.

=== Sheffield United ===
On 28 November 2014, Sheffield United completed the signing of Wallace on a deal until the end of the season. He made his debut on 13 December 2014 away at Fleetwood Town in a 1–1 draw. On 26 March 2015, Wallace joined Lincoln City on loan until the end of the season.

At the end of the 2014–15 season "The Blades" opted to extend their right to a further year on the contract for Wallace. During the pre-season, new manager Nigel Adkins played Wallace primarily at centre half, as opposed to his more customary midfield role. Adkins commented on how well Wallace was impressing in the new role and indeed Wallace has appeared regularly at the beginning of the season, again in a new defensive position, this time at left back. After spending the majority of the 2016–17 season on loan at Fleetwood Town, his contract with the Blades was terminated by mutual consent on 16 August 2017.

=== Matlock Town, Burton Albion and Mansfield Town ===
In October 2017, Wallace joined Matlock Town.

He joined Burton Albion in October 2018, initially on non-contract terms. In January 2019, he signed a contract until the end of the 2018–19 season. One month later, he signed a new contract until 2020. In April 2019, Wallace scored his first goal in professional football, opening the scoring in a 3–0 win over Scunthorpe United. In July 2020 he signed a new contract with the club, one of a trio of players taking a pay cut after the 2019–20 season was curtailed by coronavirus. In February 2021 Wallace suffered an anterior cruciate ligament injury, ruling him out until the summer.

On 19 November 2021, he joined York City on loan until 3 January 2022.

On 28 January 2022, Wallace joined Mansfield Town on a free transfer until the end of the season. He was reunited with manager Nigel Clough, who had also signed him at Sheffield United and Burton Albion. Following the conclusion of the 2021–22 season, the club triggered a clause in his contract to extend his stay for another year.

=== Hartlepool United ===
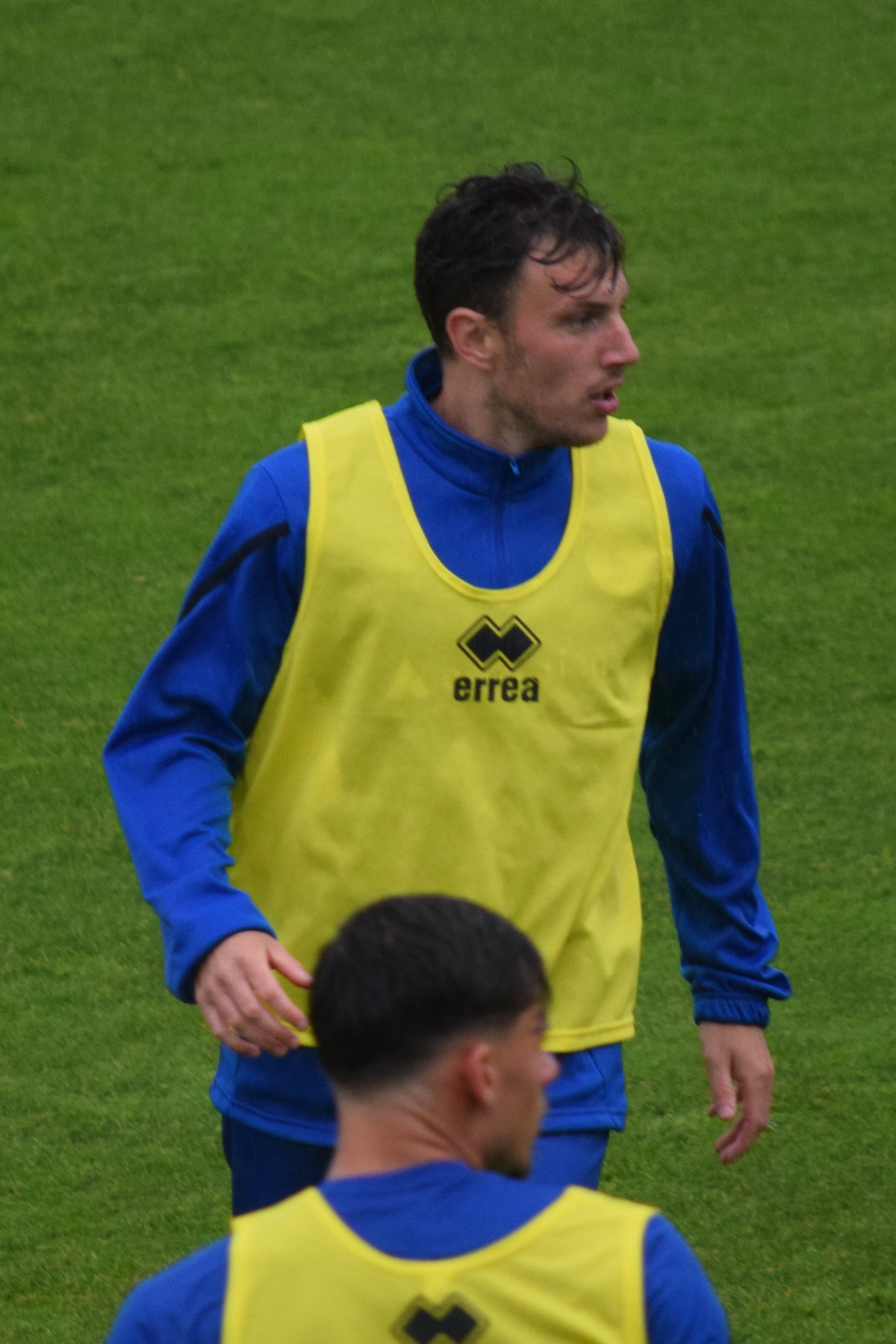
Wallace warming up for Hartlepool United in 2023

On 4 July 2023, Wallace joined National League club Hartlepool United, re-joining his former manager at York City, John Askey. Wallace broke his toe in pre-season.

Wallace was loaned to National League rivals Tamworth on 8 October 2024. On 19 December 2024, Wallace returned to Hartlepool after his Tamworth loan ended.

On 7 February 2025, Wallace joined National League North side Peterborough Sports on loan for the remainder of the season. At the end of the 2024–25 season, it was announced that he would be released by Hartlepool at the end of his contract.

== International career ==
Wallace has represented England Under-17s at international level.

== Career statistics ==
As of match played 14 February 2026

Club statistics
Club	Season	League			FA Cup		League Cup (Note: Includes Football League / EFL Cup and National League Cup)		Other		Total	
Club	Season	Division	Apps	Goals	Apps	Goals	Apps	Goals	Apps	Goals	Apps	Goals
Ilkeston	2014–15	Northern Premier League Premier Division	17	1	3	0	—		1 (Note: Appearance(s) in FA Trophy)	0	21	1
Sheffield United	2014–15	League One	4	0	0	0	2	0	—		6	0
Sheffield United	2015–16	League One	11	0	1	0	2	0	3 (Note: Appearance(s) in Football League Trophy)	0	17	0
Sheffield United	Total		15	0	1	0	4	0	3	0	23	0
Lincoln City (loan)	2014–15	Conference Premier	6	0	—		—		—		6	0
Matlock Town	2017–18	Northern Premier League Premier Division	30	2	—		—		5 (Note: Three appearances in Northern Premier League Challenge Cup, one appearance in FA Trophy, one appearance in Derbyshire Senior Cup)	0	35	2
Burton Albion	2018–19	League One	22	1	0	0	2	0	1 (Note: Appearance(s) in EFL Trophy)	0	25	1
Burton Albion	2019–20	League One	26	1	3	0	4	0	3	0	36	1
Burton Albion	2020–21	League One	12	0	1	0	2	0	2	0	17	0
Burton Albion	Total		60	2	4	0	8	0	6	0	78	2
York City (loan)	2021–22	National League North	4	0	—		—		2	0	6	0
Mansfield Town	2021–22	League Two	17	0	—		—		2 (Note: Appearances in EFL League Two play-offs)	0	19	0
Mansfield Town	2022–23	League Two	30	0	2	0	0	0	4	0	36	0
Mansfield Town	Total		47	0	2	0	0	0	6	0	55	0
Hartlepool United	2023–24	National League	21	0	0	0	0	0	2	0	23	0
Hartlepool United	2024–25	National League	0	0	0	0	0	0	0	0	0	0
Hartlepool United	Total		21	0	0	0	0	0	2	0	23	0
Tamworth (loan)	2024–25	National League	6	0	2	0	2	0	0	0	10	0
Peterborough Sports (loan)	2024–25	National League North	4	0	0	0	–		0	0	4	0
Alfreton Town	2025–26	National League North	8	1	0	0	—		1	0	9	1
Career total			218	6	12	0	14	0	28	0	272	6
