= Jevan Anderson =

Scottish footballer

Personal information
- Full name: Jevan Paul Anderson
- Date of birth: 3 March 2000 (age 26)
- Height: 6 ft 1 in (1.85 m)
- Position: Defender

Team information
- Current team: Banks O' Dee

Youth career
- Aberdeen

Senior career*
Years	Team	Apps	(Gls)
- Formartine United
2019–2021	Burton Albion	1	(0)
2020	→ Hereford (loan)	7	(0)
2020–2021	→ Kettering Town (loan)	4	(0)
2021–2022	Cove Rangers	7	(0)
2022	→ Elgin City (loan)	3	(0)
2022–2023	Elgin City	11	(0)
2023–	Banks O' Dee	0	(0)
- * Club domestic league appearances and goals as of 11:11, 21 November 2023 (UTC)

Jevan Paul Anderson (born 3 March 2000) is a Scottish footballer who plays as a defender for Highland League club Banks O' Dee. He has previously played for Burton Albion, Hereford, Kettering Town, Cove Rangers and Elgin City.

== Career ==
After playing for Aberdeen and Formartine United, he signed a one-year contract with Burton Albion in July 2019, following an earlier trial with Fleetwood Town. He made his first-team debut for Burton Albion on 3 September 2019 in the EFL Trophy, and his Football League debut on 5 October 2019. He moved on loan to Hereford in January 2020, making 7 league appearances. On 4 December 2020, Anderson joined National League North club Kettering Town on loan until 1 January 2021. This loan was then extended until 29 January 2021.

On 12 May 2021 it was announced that he would be one of 12 players leaving Burton at the end of the season. Anderson then signed with Scottish League One club Cove Rangers. On 24 February 2022, Anderson joined Scottish League Two side Elgin City on loan for the remainder of the 2021–22 season. On 31 May 2022, Anderson signed a two-year contract with Elgin City.

On 1 April 2023, Anderson joined Aberdeen-based Highland League club Banks O' Dee, signing a three-year contract.

== Personal life ==
His father is former footballer Russell Anderson.
