= List of Newcastle Jets FC records and statistics =

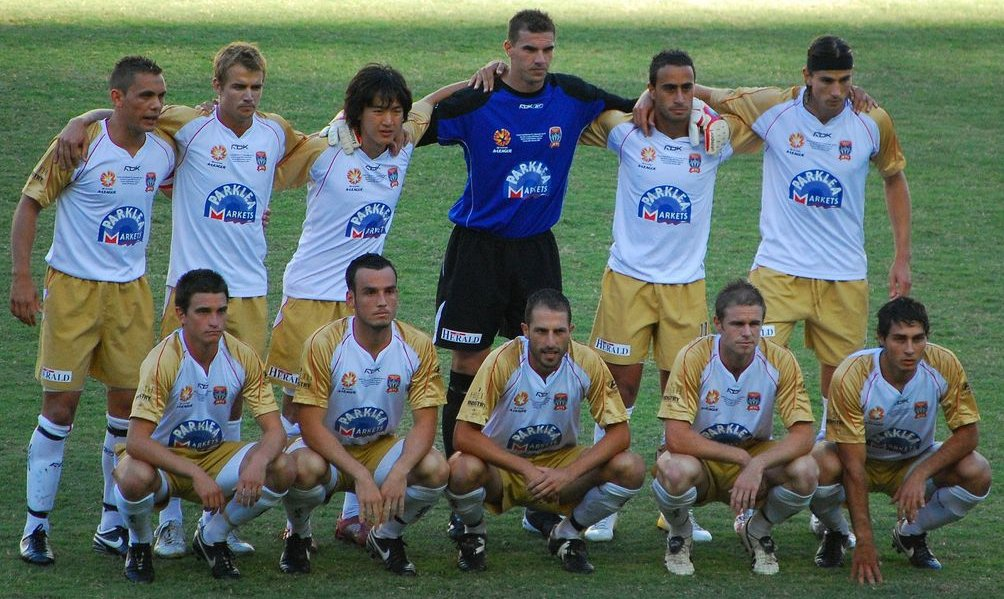
Newcastle's starting lineup for the 2008 A-League Grand Final

Newcastle Jets Football Club is an Australian professional association football club based in Speers Point, Newcastle. The club was formed in 2000 as Newcastle United before being renamed as Newcastle Jets in 2005. After spending their first four seasons participating in the National Soccer League, Newcastle became the first of three New South Wales members admitted to the A-League Men along with the Central Coast Mariners and Sydney FC.

The list encompasses the honours won by the Newcastle Jets at national and friendly level, records set by the club, their managers and their players. The player records section itemises the club's leading goalscorers and those who have made most appearances in first-team competitions.

Newcastle have won one top-flight title. The club's record appearance maker is Jason Hoffman, who had 233 appearances from 2008 to 2024. Joel Griffiths is Newcastle Jets' record goalscorer, scoring 61 goals in total.

All figures are correct as of the match played on 16 December 2023.

== Honours and achievements ==
=== Domestic ===
- National Soccer League (until 2004) and A-League Men Premiership

Winners (1): 2025–26
Runners-up (1): 2001–02

- National Soccer League (until 2004) and A-League Men Championship

Winners (1): 2008
Runners-up (1): 2018

=== Friendly titles ===
==== Pre-season ====
- Surf City Cup

Runners-up (1): 2019

== Player records ==
=== Appearances ===
- Most league appearances: Jason Hoffman, 215
- Most national cup appearances: Matt Thompson, 16
- Most AFC Champions League appearances: Ben Kantarovski and Nikolai Topor-Stanley, 8
- Youngest first-team player: Archie Goodwin, 16 years, 106 days (against Melbourne Victory, A-League, 21 February 2021)
- Oldest first-team player: Wes Hoolahan, 37 years, 308 days (against Melbourne City, A-League, 23 March 2020)
- Most consecutive appearances: Steven Ugarkovic, 113 (from 13 February 2017 — 27 March 2021)
- Most separate spells with the club: Joel Griffiths, 3 (2001–2003; 2006–2009 and 2014–2015)

==== Most appearances ====
Competitive matches only, includes appearances as substitute. Numbers in brackets indicate goals scored.

#	Name	Years	League^{a}		National Cup^{b}	AFC Champions League	Other^{c}	Total
#	Name	Years	Regular season	Finals series	National Cup^{b}	AFC Champions League	Other^{c}	Total
1	(Australia) Jason Hoffman	2007–2010; 2015–2022	209 (15)	5 (1)	15 (0)	4 (1)	0 (0)	**233** (17)
2	(Australia) Ben Kantarovski	2008–2022	195 (9)	1 (0)	6 (0)	8 (0)	0 (0)	**210** (9)
3	(Australia) Nikolai Topor-Stanley	2009–2012; 2017–2021	185 (8)	4 (0)	5 (1)	8 (0)	0 (0)	**202** (9)
4	(Australia) Tarek Elrich	2005–2012	127 (3)	7 (1)	12 (0)	7 (1)	0 (0)	**153** (5)
5	(Australia) Matt Thompson	2005–2010	110 (16)	11 (3)	16 (1)	7 (0)	1 (0)	**145** (20)
6	(Australia) Steven Ugarkovic	2016–2021	133 (9)	2 (0)	7 (0)	2 (0)	0 (0)	**144** (9)
7	(Australia) Jobe Wheelhouse	2003–2013	120 (12)	6 (0)	10 (1)	4 (0)	1 (0)	**141** (13)
8	(Australia) Joel Griffiths	2001–2003; 2006–2009; 2014–2015	117 (55)	13 (3)	8 (3)	0 (0)	0 (0)	**138** (61)
9	(Australia) Ben Kennedy	2006–2017	113 (0)	2 (0)	8 (0)	5 (0)	0 (0)	**128** (0)
10	(Australia) Nigel Boogaard	2004; 2015–2021	120 (4)	2 (0)	3 (0)	2 (1)	0 (0)	**127** (5)

a. Includes the National Soccer League and A-League Men.
b. Includes the A-League Pre-Season Challenge Cup and Australia Cup
c. Includes goals and appearances (including those as a substitute) in the 2005 Australian Club World Championship Qualifying Tournament.

=== Goalscorers ===
- First goalscorer: Anthony Surjan (against Eastern Pride, National Soccer League, 14 October 2000)
- First A-League Men goalscorer: Ante Milicic (against Central Coast Mariners, 4 September 2005)
- First hat-trick scorer: Joel Griffiths (against Northern Spirit, National Soccer League, 4 October 2002)
- First A-League Men hat-trick scorer: Ante Milicic (against New Zealand Knights, A-League, 4 November 2005)
- Youngest goalscorer: Archie Goodwin, 16 years, 151 days (against Melbourne City, A-League, 10 June 2021)
- Oldest goalscorer: Wes Hoolahan, 37 years, 93 days (against Edgeworth, FFA Cup, 21 August 2019)

==== Top goalscorers ====
Competitive matches only. Numbers in brackets indicate appearances made.

Bold indicates player still at club

#	Name	Years	League^{a}		National Cup^{b}	AFC Champions League	Other^{c}	Total
#	Name	Years	Regular season	Finals series	National Cup^{b}	AFC Champions League	Other^{c}	Total
1	(Australia) Joel Griffiths	2001–2003; 2006–2010; 2014–2015	55 (117)	3 (13)	3 (8)	0 (0)	0 (0)	**61** (138)
2	(Republic of Ireland) Roy O'Donovan	2017–2019; 2020–2021	31 (69)	0 (2)	0 (1)	0 (2)	0 (0)	**31** (74)
3	(Australia) Ryan Griffiths	2002–2004; 2010–2013	25 (101)	3 (9)	0 (0)	0 (0)	0 (0)	**28** (108)
4	(Australia) Dimitri Petratos	2017–2020	21 (77)	0 (2)	3 (6)	0 (2)	0 (0)	**24** (87)
4	(Australia) Clayton Taylor	2023–2026	23 (72)	0 (2)	1 (5)	0 (0)	0 (0)	**24** (79)
6	(Australia) **Eli Adams**	2024-	17 (45)	2 (2)	1 (5)	0 (0)	0 (0)	**20** (52)
6	(Australia) Matt Thompson	2005–2010	16 (110)	3 (11)	1 (16)	0 (7)	0 (1)	**20** (145)
6	(Australia) Apostolos Stamatelopoulos	2021; 2023-2024	20 (37)	0 (0)	0 (1)	0 (0)	0 (0)	**20** (38)
7	(Georgia (country)) Beka Mikeltadze	2021-2023	19 (47)	0 (0)	0 (1)	0 (0)	0 (0)	**19** (48)
8	(Fiji) Esala Masi	2000–2004	15 (86)	3 (10)	0 (0)	0 (0)	0 (0)	**18** (96)
8	(Australia) Andrew Nabbout	2016–2018	18 (46)	0 (0)	0 (2)	0 (0)	0 (0)	**18** (48)
8	(Australia) Adam Taggart	2012–2014	18 (44)	0 (0)	0 (0)	0 (0)	0 (0)	**18** (44)
11	(Australia) Jason Hoffman	2007–2010; 2015–2024	15 (209)	1 (5)	0 (15)	1 (4)	0 (0)	**17** (233)

a. Includes the National Soccer League and A-League Men.
b. Includes the A-League Pre-Season Challenge Cup and Australia Cup
c. Includes goals and appearances (including those as a substitute) in the 2005 Australian Club World Championship Qualifying Tournament.

=== International ===
This section refers to caps won while a Newcastle Jets player.

- First capped player: Chris Zoricich for New Zealand against Malaysia on 19 August 2000

== Managerial records ==
- First full-time manager: Lee Sterrey managed Newcastle Jets from July 2000 to June 2001.
- Longest-serving manager: Ian Crook — 2 years, 365 days (1 July 2001 to 30 June 2004)
- Shortest tenure as manager: Phil Stubbins — 2 weeks, 6 days (5 May 2015 to 25 May 2015)

== Club records ==
=== Matches ===
==== Firsts ====
- First match: Eastern Pride 1–1 Newcastle United, National Soccer League, 14 October 2000
- First A-League Men match: Newcastle Jets 0–1 Adelaide United, 26 August 2005
- First national cup match: Newcastle Jets 1–1 Melbourne Victory, A-League Pre-Season Challenge Cup group stage, 22 July 2005
- First AFC Champions League match: Beijing Guoan 2–0 Newcastle Jets, Group stage, 10 March 2009

==== Record wins ====
- Record league win: 8–2 against Central Coast Mariners, A-League, 14 August 2018
- Record national cup win: 5–1 against Edgeworth, FFA Cup Round of 16, 21 August 2019
- Record AFC Champions League win:
  - 2–0 against Ulsan Hyundai, Group stage, 17 March 2009
  - 3–1 against Persija Jakarta, Qualifying round, 12 January 2019

==== Record defeats ====
- Record league defeat: 0–7 against Adelaide United, A-League, 24 January 2015
- Record national cup defeat: 1–4 against Adelaide United, A-League Pre-Season Challenge Cup group stage, 27 July 2007
- Record AFC Champions League defeat: 0–6 against Pohang Steelers, Group stage, 20 May 2009

==== Record consecutive results ====
- Record consecutive wins: 7
  - from 1 January 2026 to February 2026
- Record consecutive defeats: 7
  - from 5 March 2017 to 9 August 2017
  - from 28 February 2021 to 10 April 2021
- Record consecutive matches without a defeat: 10
  - from 1 January 2026 to 7 March 2026
- Record consecutive matches without a win: 17, from 26 January 2006 to 8 October 2006
- Record consecutive matches without conceding a goal: 3
  - from 11 November 2005 to 25 November 2005
  - from 6 January 2006 to 22 January 2006
  - from 4 December 2010 to 15 December 2010
  - from 5 January 2013 to 19 January 2013
  - from 24 July 2020 to 13 August 2020
  - from 7 February 2021 to 21 February 2021
  - from 18 March 2022 to 30 March 2022
- Record consecutive matches without scoring a goal: 6
  - from 4 December 2015 to 9 January 2016
  - from 18 March 2017 to 9 August 2017

=== Goals ===
- Most league goals scored in a season: 57 in 27 matches, A-League, 2017–18
- Fewest league goals scored in a season: 18 in 24 matches, National Soccer League, 2003–04
- Most league goals conceded in a season: 56 in 30 matches, National Soccer League, 2000–01
- Fewest league goals conceded in a season:
  - 21 in 24 matches, National Soccer League, 2001–02
  - 21 in 21 matches, A-League, 2007–08

=== Points ===
- Most points in a season: 50 in 27 matches, A-League, 2017–18
- Fewest points in a season: 17 in 27 matches, A-League, 2014–15
