= 2019–20 Brisbane Roar FC season =

Brisbane Roar
2019–20 season
- Chairman: Rahim Soekasah
- Manager: Robbie Fowler (to 29 June 2020); Darren Davies & Warren Moon (caretakers) (from 29 June 2020 to 16 July 2020); Warren Moon (from 16 July 2020)
- Stadium: Suncorp Stadium
- A-League: 4th
- A-League Finals: Elimination-finals
- FFA Cup: Round of 16
- Top goalscorer: League: Scott McDonald; Roy O'Donovan (6 each); All: Roy O'Donovan (7)
- Highest home attendance: 12,859 vs. Melbourne Victory (25 October 2019); A-League
- Lowest home attendance: 4,121 vs. Central Coast Mariners (13 March 2020); A-League
- Average home league attendance: 9,388
Home colours	Away colours	Third colours

The 2019–20 season is Brisbane Roar's 15th participating in the A-League and in the FFA Cup for the 6th time. Brisbane also announced they would split home A-League games between Suncorp Stadium and Dolphin Oval in Redcliffe.

On 24 March 2020, the FFA announced that the 2019–20 A-League season would be postponed until further notice due to the COVID-19 pandemic in Australia and New Zealand, and subsequently extended indefinitely. The season resumed on 17 July 2020.

== Players ==
Note: Flags indicate national team as defined under FIFA eligibility rules; some limited exceptions apply. Players may hold more than one non-FIFA nationality.

No.	Pos.	Nation	Player
1	GK	NZL	Max Crocombe
2	DF	AUS	Scott Neville
3	DF	AUS	Corey Brown
4	DF	AUS	Daniel Bowles
5	DF	SCO	Tom Aldred (Captain)
6	DF	ENG	Macaulay Gillesphey
7	FW	NZL	Jai Ingham
8	MF	AUS	Danny Kim (on loan from Lions FC)
10	MF	AUS	Brad Inman
12	MF	NZL	Matthew Ridenton
14	MF	AUS	George Mells
15	DF	AUS	Aaron Reardon
19	DF	AUS	Jack Hingert

No.	Pos.	Nation	Player
20	FW	WAL	Aaron Amadi-Holloway
21	GK	ENG	Jamie Young
22	DF	AUS	Jake McGing
23	FW	AUS	Dylan Wenzel-Halls
25	MF	AUS	Rahmat Akbari
26	MF	IRL	Jay O'Shea
27	DF	AUS	Kai Trewin (Scholarship)
28	DF	AUS	Izaack Powell (Scholarship)
29	DF	AUS	Jordan Courtney-Perkins (Scholarship)
30	FW	AUS	Mirza Muratovic (Scholarship)
31	GK	AUS	Macklin Freke (Scholarship)
77	FW	AUS	Scott McDonald

== Transfers ==
=== Transfers in ===
No.	Position	Player	Transferred from	Type/fee	Contract length	Date	Ref
25	MF	Rahmat Akbari	Melbourne Victory	Free transfer	—	4 June 2019	(Note: Akbari returned to Brisbane Roar's youth squad, and was later promoted to the senior contract following a trial.)
9	FW	(Republic of Ireland) Roy O'Donovan	Unattached	Free transfer	2 years	24 June 2019	
5	DF	(Scotland) Tom Aldred	Unattached	Free transfer	1 year	25 June 2019	
20	FW	(Wales) Aaron Amadi-Holloway	(England) Shrewsbury Town	Undisclosed	1 year	25 June 2019	
6	DF	(England) Macaulay Gillesphey	Unattached	Free transfer	2 years	25 June 2019	
22	DF	Jake McGing	Unattached	Free transfer	1 year	26 June 2019	
14	MF	George Mells	Unattached	Free transfer	2 years	26 June 2019	
10	MF	Brad Inman	Unattached	Free transfer	1 year	27 June 2019	
12	MF	Aiden O'Neill	(England) Burnley	Loan	1 year	27 June 2019	
26	MF	(Republic of Ireland) Jay O'Shea	Unattached	Free transfer	1 year	28 June 2019	
2	DF	Scott Neville	Unattached	Free transfer	1 year	30 June 2019	
1	GK	(New Zealand) Max Crocombe	(England) Salford City	Free transfer	1 year	18 July 2019	
7	FW	(New Zealand) Jai Ingham	Central Coast Mariners	Free transfer	1 year	1 August 2019	
3	DF	Corey Brown	Melbourne Victory	Free transfer	0.5 years	17 January 2020	
77	FW	Scott McDonald	Western United	Free transfer	1.5 years	17 January 2020	
8	MF	Danny Kim	(Australia) Lions FC	Loan	2 months	16 July 2020	
12	MF	(New Zealand) Matthew Ridenton	Unattached	Free transfer	2 months	16 July 2020	

=== Transfers out ===
No.	Position	Player	Transferred to	Type/fee	Date	Ref
17	MF	Matt McKay	Retired		17 April 2019	
33	FW	(Brazil) Henrique	Unattached	Undisclosed	21 April 2019	
7	MF	(Denmark) Thomas Kristensen	Unattached	Free transfer	27 April 2019	
3	DF	Luke DeVere	Unattached	Free transfer	30 April 2019	
10	FW	Brett Holman	Unattached	Free transfer	30 April 2019	
11	MF	(France) Éric Bauthéac	Unattached	Free transfer	30 April 2019	
14	MF	(Spain) Álex López	Unattached	Free transfer	30 April 2019	
22	MF	(Denmark) Tobias Mikkelsen	Unattached	Free transfer	30 April 2019	
18	MF	Joe Caletti	Unattached	Free transfer	30 April 2019	
92	FW	Eli Babalj	Unattached	Free transfer	30 April 2019	
16	FW	Charles Lokolingoy	Unattached	Free transfer	30 April 2019	
15	DF	Stefan Nigro	Unattached	Free transfer	30 April 2019	
12	DF	Ruon Tongyik	Unattached	Free transfer	30 April 2019	
1	GK	Brendan White	Unattached	Free transfer	30 April 2019	
35	MF	Jay Barnett	Melbourne Victory	Free transfer	4 June 2019	
36	FW	Daniel Leck	(Australia) Pascoe Vale	Free transfer	6 June 2019	
26	FW	Nicholas D'Agostino	Perth Glory	Mutual contract termination	24 June 2019	
2	DF	(New Zealand) Dane Ingham	Perth Glory	Mutual contract termination	25 June 2019	
24	DF	Connor O'Toole	Newcastle Jets	Free transfer	27 January 2020	
13	MF	Stefan Mauk	Adelaide United	Free transfer	30 January 2020	
9	FW	(Republic of Ireland) Roy O'Donovan	Newcastle Jets	Free transfer	31 January 2020	
8	MF	Jacob Pepper	(Indonesia) Madura United	Mutual contract termination	7 March 2020	
12	MF	Aiden O'Neill	(England) Burnley	End of loan	7 July 2020	

=== From youth squad ===
N	Pos.	Nat.	Name	Age	Notes
25	MF	(Australia)	Rahmat Akbari	19	2 year senior contract
27	DF	(Australia)	Kai Trewin	18	1 year scholarship contract
29	DF	(Australia)	Jordan Courtney-Perkins	16	1 year scholarship contract
31	GK	(Australia)	Macklin Freke	20	1 year scholarship contract
30	FW	(Australia)	Mirza Muratovic	20	1.5 year scholarship contract

=== Contract extensions ===
No.	Name	Position	Duration	Date	Notes
8	Jacob Pepper	Defensive midfielder	1 year	27 June 2019	
21	(England) Jamie Young	Goalkeeper	2 years	2 January 2020	
27	Kai Trewin	Defender	1 year (scholarship contract)	23 January 2020	
28	Izaack Powell	Left-back	1 year (scholarship contract)	23 January 2020	
19	Jack Hingert	Right-back	2+ years	23 January 2020	

== Technical staff ==
Position	Name
Head coach	(Australia) Warren Moon
Assistant coach	(Wales) Darren Davies
Goalkeeping coach	(Australia) Jason Kearton
Strength and conditioning	Scott Smith
Head of high performance	Craig Duncan
Kit manager	Ant Sartori
Head physiotherapist	(Canada) Jasraj Sidhu
Assistant physiotherapist	Alex Downie
Performance analyst	George Apostolidis

== Pre-season ==
=== Friendlies ===
Win Draw Loss

13 July 2019	Brisbane Roar (Australia)	3–0	(Australia) Redlands United	Logan, Australia
15:00 AEST	Muratovic 11'; Akbari 37'; Amadi-Holloway 71'	Report		Stadium: Logan Metro Sports Park; Attendance: 2,122

20 July 2019	Brisbane Roar (Australia)	4–0	(Australia) Brisbane City	Logan, Australia
15:00 AEST	Amadi-Holloway 12'; O'Donovan 41', 44'; Akbari 68'	Report		Stadium: Logan Metro Sports Park; Attendance: 1,560

27 July 2019	Gladstone Select XI (Australia)	0–11	(Australia) Brisbane Roar	Gladstone, Australia
15:00 AEST		Report	O'Donovan 1', 62'; Inman 12'; Gillesphey 16'; Mells 28'; O'Shea 28', 30', 68', 86'; Mauk 79'; Mariner 87'	Stadium: Marley Brown Oval

22 August 2019	Brisbane Roar (Australia)	5–1	(Australia) Coomera Colts	Logan, Australia
		Report		Stadium: Logan Metro Sports Park; Attendance: 0 (behind closed doors)

30 August 2019 Surf City Cup	Brisbane Roar (Australia)	1–0	(Australia) Perth Glory	Gold Coast, Australia
18:30 AEST	Ingham 61'	Report		Stadium: Croatian Sports Centre

1 September 2019 Surf City Cup	Brisbane Roar (Australia)	3–1	(Australia) Newcastle Jets	Gold Coast, Australia
16:15 AEST	Muratovic 16'; Inman 39', 81'	Report	Fitzgerald 46'	Stadium: Croatian Sports Centre

21 September 2019	Football Wide Bay Select XI (Australia)	1–4	(Australia) Brisbane Roar	Nikenbah, Australia
17:00 AEST	49'	Report	Gillesphey 55'; Reardon 66'; Wenzel-Halls 73', 90'	Stadium: Fraser Coast Sports and Recreation Precinct

28 September 2019	Brisbane Roar (Australia)	5–0	(Australia) Gold Coast Knights	Logan, Australia
16:30 AEST	O'Donovan 16'; Aldred 27'; Inman 56', 61'; Mauk 86'	Report		Stadium: Logan Metro Sports Park

5 October 2019	Peninsula Power (Australia)	2–2	(Australia) Brisbane Roar	Redcliffe, Australia
16:30 AEST	Briggs 21' (pen.), 53' (pen.)	Report	Inman 5', 7'	Stadium: A.J. Kelly Park

11 July 2020 EVA Air Queensland Champions Cup	Brisbane Roar (Australia)	Postponed	(England) Crystal Palace	Townsville, Australia
18:30 AEST		Postponement		Stadium: Queensland Country Bank Stadium

15 July 2020 EVA Air Queensland Champions Cup	Brisbane Roar (Australia)	Postponed	(England) West Ham United	Gold Coast, Australia
19:30 AEST		Postponement		Stadium: Cbus Super Stadium

== Competitions ==
Win Draw Loss

=== Overview ===
Competition	First match	Last match	Starting round	Final position	Record							
Competition	First match	Last match	Starting round	Final position	Pld	W	D	L	GF	GA	GD	Win %
A-League	13 October 2019	10 August 2020	Matchday 1	4th	26	11	7	8	29	28	+1	42.31
A-League Finals	23 August 2020		Elimination-finals	Elimination-finals	1	0	0	1	0	1	−1	0.00
FFA Cup	7 August 2019	28 August 2019	Round of 32	Round of 16	2	1	1	0	4	2	+2	50.00
Total					29	12	8	9	33	31	+2	41.38

Source: Soccerway

=== FFA Cup ===
7 August 2019 Round of 32	Sydney FC (New South Wales)	0–2	(Queensland) Brisbane Roar	Sydney
19:30		Report	Mauk 42'; O'Shea 47'	Stadium: Leichhardt Oval; Attendance: 2,350; Referee: Katie Patterson

28 August 2019 Round of 16	Brisbane Roar (Queensland)	2–2 (a.e.t.) (2–4 p)	(New South Wales) Central Coast Mariners	Brisbane
19:30	Inman 47'; O'Donovan 87' (pen.)	Report	Simon 21' (pen.); Silvera 85'	Stadium: Dolphin Oval; Attendance: 6,235; Referee: Alex King
	Penalties
	O'Neill (penalty scored); Gillesphey (penalty scored); O'Donovan (penalty missed); Aldred (penalty missed)		(penalty scored) Simon; (penalty scored) Stensness; (penalty scored) Đurić; (penalty scored) Melling

=== A-League ===
==== League table ====
Pos	Team	Pld	W	D	L	GF	GA	GD	Pts	Qualification
1	Sydney FC (C)	26	16	5	5	49	25	+24	53	Qualification for 2021 AFC Champions League group stage and Finals series (Note: All Australian teams withdrew from the 2021 AFC Champions League on 4 June 2021.) (Note: The top two teams enter the Finals series at the semi-finals, while the teams ranked third to sixth enter the Finals series at the elimination-finals.)
2	Melbourne City	26	14	5	7	49	37	+12	47	Qualification for 2021 AFC Champions League qualifying play-offs and Finals series
3	Wellington Phoenix (Note: Wellington Phoenix cannot qualify for the 2021 AFC Champions League as they are not recognised as an AFC club.)	26	12	5	9	38	33	+5	41	Qualification for Finals series
4	Brisbane Roar	26	11	7	8	29	28	+1	40	Qualification for 2021 AFC Champions League qualifying play-offs and Finals series
5	Western United	26	12	3	11	46	37	+9	39	Qualification for Finals series
6	Perth Glory	26	10	7	9	43	36	+7	37	Qualification for Finals series
7	Adelaide United	26	11	3	12	44	49	−5	36	
8	Newcastle Jets	26	9	7	10	32	40	−8	34	
9	Western Sydney Wanderers	26	9	6	11	35	40	−5	33	
10	Melbourne Victory	26	6	5	15	33	44	−11	23	
11	Central Coast Mariners	26	5	3	18	26	55	−29	18	

Source: A-Leagues
Rules for classification: 1) points; 2) goal difference; 3) number of goals scored.
(C) Champions

==== Results summary ====
Overall								Home						Away					
Pld	W	D	L	GF	GA	GD	Pts	W	D	L	GF	GA	GD	W	D	L	GF	GA	GD
22	10	5	7	25	24	+1	35	7	2	2	17	11	+6	3	3	5	8	13	−5

Source: worldfootball.net

==== Results by round ====
Round	1	2	3	4	5	6	7	8	9	10	11	12	13	14	15	16	17	18	19	20	21	22	23	27	29	24	28	25
Ground	A	B	H	A	A	H	A	H	A	H	B	A	A	H	H	A	A	H	A	H	A	H	H	H	N	N	N	N
Result	D	X	L	D	L	W	L	W	L	L	X	D	W	D	W	W	L	W	W	D	L	W	W	W	L	W	D	D
Position	4	6	10	9	9	7	8	6	9	9	10	10	9	9	7	7	7	6	6	6	6	5	4	4	4	4	4	4
Points	1	1	1	2	2	5	5	8	8	8	8	9	12	13	16	19	19	22	25	26	26	29	32	35	35	38	39	40

Source: worldfootball.net
A = Away; H = Home; N = Neutral; B = Bye; W = Win; D = Draw; L = Loss; X = Bye

==== Matches ====
13 October 2019 1	Perth Glory	1–1	Brisbane Roar	Perth
18:00 AWST	Ikonomidis 34'	Report	O'Donovan 90+5'	Stadium: HBF Park; Attendance: 9,829; Referee: Shaun Evans

25 October 2019 3	Brisbane Roar	0–1	Melbourne Victory	Brisbane
18:30 AEST		Report	Nabbout 19'	Stadium: Suncorp Stadium; Attendance: 12,859; Referee: Kurt Ams

2 November 2019 4	Western Sydney Wanderers	0–0	Brisbane Roar	Sydney
17:00 AEDT		Report		Stadium: Bankwest Stadium; Attendance: 14,216; Referee: Daniel Elder

10 November 2019 5	Adelaide United	1–0	Brisbane Roar	Adelaide
17:30 ACDT	McGree 84'	Report		Stadium: Coopers Stadium; Attendance: 8,428; Referee: Alireza Faghani

17 November 2019 6	Brisbane Roar	4–3	Melbourne City	Redcliffe
15:00 AEST	O'Donovan 50', 64' (pen.), 83' (pen.); Amadi-Holloway 60'	Report	Maclaren 6', 29', 51'	Stadium: Dolphin Stadium; Attendance: 9,387; Referee: Alex King

23 November 2019 7	Wellington Phoenix	2–1	Brisbane Roar	Wellington
19:00 NZDT	Taylor 10'; Dávila 49'	Report	Mauk 85'	Stadium: Westpac Stadium; Attendance: 6,790; Referee: Adam Kersey

30 November 2019 8	Brisbane Roar	2–0	Central Coast Mariners	Brisbane
16:00 AEST	O'Donovan 61'; Neville 66'	Report		Stadium: Suncorp Stadium; Attendance: 11,263; Referee: Ben Abraham

7 December 2019 9	Sydney FC	5–1	Brisbane Roar	Sydney
19:30 AEDT	Le Fondre 7', 42', 89'; Ninković 25'; Buhagiar 86'	Report	O'Donovan 90+5' (pen.)	Stadium: Jubilee Stadium; Attendance: 10,711; Referee: Alireza Faghani

13 December 2019 10	Brisbane Roar	0–2	Western United	Brisbane
18:30 AEST		Report	Pain 11'; Berisha 45+1'	Stadium: Suncorp Stadium; Attendance: 8,582; Referee: Chris Beath

28 December 2019 12	Newcastle Jets	1–1	Brisbane Roar	Newcastle
19:30 AEDT	D. Petratos 32'	Report	Inman 87'	Stadium: McDonald Jones Stadium; Attendance: 7,449; Referee: Alireza Faghani

1 January 2020 13	Western Sydney Wanderers	1–2	Brisbane Roar	Sydney
19:30 AEDT	Duke 5'	Report	Neville 20'; Inman 61'	Stadium: Bankwest Stadium; Attendance: 11,482; Referee: Alex King

11 January 2020 14	Brisbane Roar	2–2	Melbourne City	Brisbane
16:00 AEST	Inman 34', 45+3'	Report	Noone 39'; Atkinson 48'	Stadium: Suncorp Stadium; Attendance: 10,659; Referee: Daniel Elder

18 January 2020 15	Brisbane Roar	1–0	Wellington Phoenix	Brisbane
16:00 AEST	Wenzel-Halls 69'	Report		Stadium: Suncorp Stadium; Attendance: 9,987; Referee: Alex King

25 January 2020 16	Central Coast Mariners	0–1	Brisbane Roar	Gosford
17:00 AEDT		Report	Brown 86'	Stadium: Central Coast Stadium; Attendance: 4,539; Referee: Adam Fielding

31 January 2020 17	Sydney FC	1–0	Brisbane Roar	Sydney
19:30 AEDT	Le Fondre 57' (pen.)	Report		Stadium: Jubilee Stadium; Attendance: 10,724; Referee: Chris Beath

8 February 2020 18	Brisbane Roar	2–1	Adelaide United	Brisbane
18:30 AEST	Muratovic 68'; Aldred 74'	Report	Halloran 58'	Stadium: Suncorp Stadium; Attendance: 8,945; Referee: Adam Fielding

16 February 2020 19	Western United	0–1	Brisbane Roar	Melbourne
16:00 AEDT		Report	Muratovic 61'	Stadium: Mars Stadium; Attendance: 2,973; Referee: Alireza Faghani

23 February 2020 20	Brisbane Roar	1–1	Perth Glory	Redcliffe
15:00 AEST	Gillesphey 85'	Report	Fornaroli 33'	Stadium: Dolphin Stadium; Attendance: 9,224

1 March 2020 21	Melbourne City	1–0	Brisbane Roar	Melbourne
18:30 AEDT	Young 55' (o.g.)	Report		Stadium: AAMI Park; Attendance: 7,559; Referee: Shaun Evans

6 March 2020 22	Brisbane Roar	3–1	Western Sydney Wanderers	Brisbane
18:30 AEST	McDonald 3', 37'; O'Shea 72' (pen.)	Report	Duke 54'	Stadium: Suncorp Stadium; Attendance: 8,349; Referee: Chris Beath

13 March 2020 23	Brisbane Roar	1–0	Central Coast Mariners	Brisbane
18:30 AEST	McDonald 45+3'	Report		Stadium: Suncorp Stadium; Attendance: 4,121; Referee: Alireza Faghani

20 March 2020 27	Brisbane Roar	1–0	Newcastle Jets	Brisbane
16:00 AEST	McDonald 16'	Report		Stadium: Dolphin Stadium; Attendance: 0 (behind closed doors due to COVID-19 pandemic); Referee: Adam Kersey

19 July 2020 29	Brisbane Roar	0–1	Adelaide United	Gold Coast
19:30 AEST		Report	Opseth 6'	Stadium: Cbus Stadium; Attendance: 1,035; Referee: Alireza Faghani

29 July 2020 24	Melbourne Victory	1–2	Brisbane Roar	Sydney
19:30 AEDT	Nabbout 86' (pen.)	Report	McDonald 56'; Ridenton 78'	Stadium: Bankwest Stadium; Attendance: 0 Referee: Alex King

5 August 2020 28	Wellington Phoenix	1–1	Brisbane Roar	Newcastle
18:00 AEDT	Hooper 82'	Report	McDonald 61'	Stadium: McDonald Jones Stadium; Attendance: 0 Referee: Alex King

10 August 2020 25	Brisbane Roar	1–1	Sydney FC	Newcastle
19:30 AEDT	Wenzel-Halls 11'	Report	Ivanovic 40'	Stadium: McDonald Jones Stadium; Attendance: 0 Referee: Stephen Lucas

==== Finals series ====
23 August 2020 Elimination-final	Brisbane Roar	0–1	Western United	Sydney
18:00 AEDT		Report	Diamanti 21'	Stadium: Bankwest Stadium; Attendance: 0 Referee: Chris Beath

== Statistics ==
=== Appearances and goals ===
Includes all competitions. Players with no appearances not included in the list.

No.	Pos	Nat	Player	Total		A-League		A-League Finals		FFA Cup	
No.	Pos	Nat	Player	Apps	Goals	Apps	Goals	Apps	Goals	Apps	Goals
1	GK	(New Zealand) NZL	Max Crocombe	6	0	6	0	0	0	0	0
2	DF	(Australia) AUS	Scott Neville	27	2	24	2	1	0	2	0
3	DF	(Australia) AUS	Corey Brown	15	0	14	0	1	0	0	0
4	DF	(Australia) AUS	Daniel Bowles	12	0	9+3	0	0	0	0	0
5	DF	(Scotland) SCO	Tom Aldred	28	1	25	1	1	0	2	0
6	DF	(England) ENG	Macaulay Gillesphey	29	1	26	1	1	0	2	0
7	FW	(New Zealand) NZL	Jai Ingham	11	0	0+8	0	0+1	0	0+2	0
8	DF	(Australia) AUS	Danny Kim	5	0	3+1	0	1	0	0	0
10	FW	(Australia) AUS	Brad Inman	27	5	21+3	4	0+1	0	2	1
12	MF	(New Zealand) NZL	Matthew Ridenton	5	1	2+2	1	1	0	0	0
14	MF	(Australia) AUS	George Mells	1	0	0	0	0	0	0+1	0
19	DF	(Australia) AUS	Jack Hingert	18	0	17	0	1	0	0	0
20	MF	(Wales) WAL	Aaron Amadi-Holloway	23	1	5+17	1	0+1	0	0	0
21	GK	(England) ENG	Jamie Young	23	0	20	0	1	0	2	0
22	DF	(Australia) AUS	Jake McGing	10	0	6+2	0	0	0	2	0
23	FW	(Australia) AUS	Dylan Wenzel-Halls	21	2	11+9	2	1	0	0	0
25	MF	(Australia) AUS	Rahmat Akbari	7	0	2+3	0	0	0	2	0
26	MF	(Republic of Ireland) IRL	Jay O'Shea	29	2	26	1	1	0	2	1
27	DF	(Australia) AUS	Kai Trewin	3	0	0+2	0	0+1	0	0	0
28	DF	(Australia) AUS	Izaack Powell	4	0	0+4	0	0	0	0	0
29	DF	(Australia) AUS	Jordan Courtney-Perkins	9	0	4+3	0	0	0	2	0
30	FW	(Australia) AUS	Mirza Muratovic	13	2	7+6	2	0	0	0	0
77	FW	(Australia) AUS	Scott McDonald	14	6	12+1	6	1	0	0	0
Player(s) transferred out but featured this season
8	DF	(Australia) AUS	Jacob Pepper	13	0	12	0	0	0	0+1	0
9	FW	(Republic of Ireland) IRL	Roy O'Donovan	14	7	9+3	6	0	0	2	1
12	MF	(Australia) AUS	Aiden O'Neill	18	0	14+3	0	0	0	0+1	0
13	MF	(Australia) AUS	Stefan Mauk	12	2	9+1	1	0	0	2	1
24	DF	(Australia) AUS	Connor O'Toole	4	0	2	0	0	0	0+2	0

=== Disciplinary record ===
Includes all competitions. The list is sorted by squad number when total cards are equal. Players with no cards not included in the list.

No.	Pos	Nat	Player	Total			A-League			A-League Finals			FFA Cup		
No.	Pos	Nat	Player	Yellow card	Second yellow card	Red card	Yellow card	Second yellow card	Red card	Yellow card	Second yellow card	Red card	Yellow card	Second yellow card	Red card
2	DF	(Australia) AUS	Scott Neville	7	1	0	6	1	0	0	0	0	1	0	0
5	DF	(Scotland) SCO	Tom Aldred	9	0	0	7	0	0	1	0	0	1	0	0
19	DF	(Australia) AUS	Jack Hingert	5	0	0	5	0	0	0	0	0	0	0	0
77	FW	(Australia) AUS	Scott McDonald	5	0	0	4	0	0	1	0	0	0	0	0
4	DF	(Australia) AUS	Daniel Bowles	4	0	0	4	0	0	0	0	0	0	0	0
12	MF	(Australia) AUS	Aiden O'Neill	4	0	0	4	0	0	0	0	0	0	0	0
9	FW	(Republic of Ireland) IRL	Roy O'Donovan	3	0	0	3	0	0	0	0	0	0	0	0
13	MF	(Australia) AUS	Stefan Mauk	3	0	0	3	0	0	0	0	0	0	0	0
26	MF	(Republic of Ireland) IRL	Jay O'Shea	3	0	0	3	0	0	0	0	0	0	0	0
3	DF	(Australia) AUS	Corey Brown	2	0	0	2	0	0	0	0	0	0	0	0
8	DF	(Australia) AUS	Jacob Pepper	2	0	0	2	0	0	0	0	0	0	0	0
12	MF	(New Zealand) NZL	Matthew Ridenton	2	0	0	2	0	0	0	0	0	0	0	0
22	DF	(Australia) AUS	Jake McGing	2	0	0	1	0	0	0	0	0	1	0	0
23	FW	(Australia) AUS	Dylan Wenzel-Halls	2	0	0	2	0	0	0	0	0	0	0	0
6	DF	(England) ENG	Macaulay Gillesphey	1	0	0	1	0	0	0	0	0	0	0	0
10	FW	(Australia) AUS	Brad Inman	1	0	0	1	0	0	0	0	0	0	0	0
20	MF	(Wales) WAL	Aaron Amadi-Holloway	1	0	0	1	0	0	0	0	0	0	0	0
21	GK	(England) ENG	Jamie Young	1	0	0	0	0	0	0	0	0	1	0	0

- (yellow card) = Number of bookings; (second yellow card) = Number of sending offs after a second yellow card; (red card) = Number of sending offs by a direct red card.

=== Clean sheets ===
Includes all competitions. The list is sorted by squad number when total clean sheets are equal. Numbers in parentheses represent games where both goalkeepers participated and both kept a clean sheet; the number in parentheses is awarded to the goalkeeper who was substituted on, whilst a full clean sheet is awarded to the goalkeeper who was on the field at the start of play. Goalkeepers with no clean sheets not included in the list.

Rank	No.	Nat.	Goalkeeper	A-League	A-League Finals	FFA Cup	Total
1	21	(England)	Jamie Young	6	0	1	7
2	1	(New Zealand)	Max Crocombe	1	0	0	1
Total				7	0	1	8
