= 2023–24 Burton Albion F.C. season =

74th season in existence of Burton Albion FC

Burton Albion
2023–24 season
- Chairman: Ben Robinson
- Manager: Dino Maamria (until 9 December 2023); Martin Paterson (from 11 January)
- Stadium: Pirelli Stadium
- League One: 20th
- FA Cup: First round
- EFL Cup: First round
- EFL Trophy: Third round

The 2023–24 season is the 74th season in the history of Burton Albion and their sixth consecutive season in League One. The club are participating in League One, the FA Cup, the EFL Cup, and the 2023–24 EFL Trophy.

== Current squad ==
As of 23 March 2024

No.	Name	Position	Nationality	Place of birth	Date of birth (age)	Previous club	Date signed	Fee	Contract end
Goalkeepers
1	Max Crocombe	GK	(New Zealand)	Auckland	12 August 1993 (age 33)	Grimsby Town	1 July 2023	Free	30 June 2025
13	Jake Kean	GK	(England)	Derby	4 February 1991 (age 35)	Notts County	19 November 2021	Free	30 June 2024
30	Jamal Blackman	GK	(England)	Croydon	27 October 1993 (age 33)	Exeter City	3 July 2023	Free	30 June 2025
Defenders
2	John Brayford	RB	(England)	Stoke-on-Trent	29 December 1987 (age 38)	Sheffield United	31 August 2017	Free	30 June 2024
3	Steve Seddon	LB	(England)	Reading	25 December 1997 (age 28)	Oxford United	14 July 2023	Loan	31 May 2024
4	Adedeji Oshilaja	CB	(England)	Bermondsey	16 July 1993 (age 33)	Charlton Athletic	1 July 2021	Free	30 June 2025
5	Sam Hughes	CB	(England)	West Kirby	15 April 1997 (age 29)	Leicester City	31 January 2022	Undisclosed	30 June 2024
6	Ryan Sweeney	CB	(England)	Kingston upon Thames	15 April 1997 (age 29)	(Scotland) Dundee	14 July 2023	Free	30 June 2025
12	Jasper Moon	CB	(England)	Coventry	24 November 2000 (age 25)	Barnsley	18 July 2023	Undisclosed	30 June 2026
22	Jake Caprice	RB	(England)	Lambeth	11 November 1992 (age 34)	Exeter City	19 July 2023	Free	30 June 2025
23	Tolaji Bola	LB	(England)	Camden	4 January 1999 (age 27)	Rotherham United	23 January 2024	Loan	31 May 2024
26	Finn Delap	CB	(England)		10 June 2005 (age 21)	Academy	1 July 2023	Trainee	30 June 2025
37	Tom Hamer	RB	(England)	Bolton	1 October 1999 (age 27)	Oldham Athletic	29 January 2021	Undisclosed	30 June 2025
46	Aristote Nsiala	CB	(Democratic Republic of the Congo)	Kinshasa	25 March 1992 (age 34)	Fleetwood Town	9 February 2024	Free	30 June 2024
Midfielders
7	Joe Powell	AM	(England)	Canning Town	30 October 1998 (age 28)	West Ham United	14 January 2020	Undisclosed	30 June 2024
8	Rekeem Harper	CM	(England)	Birmingham	8 March 2000 (age 26)	Ipswich Town	1 July 2023	Free	30 June 2025
16	Kegs Chauke	CM	(South Africa)	Pretoria	8 January 2003 (age 23)	Southampton	29 June 2023	Undisclosed	30 June 2025
17	Mark Helm	CM	(England)	Warrington	21 October 2001 (age 25)	Burnley	12 January 2023	Undisclosed	30 June 2024
25	Ciaran Gilligan	CM	(Republic of Ireland)	Derby	5 February 2002 (age 24)	Academy	1 July 2020	Trainee	30 June 2024
—N/a	Daniel Matthews	CM	(England)			Academy	9 August 2023	Trainee	30 June 2024
—N/a	Ronny Wakelin	DM	(England)		16 June 2006 (age 20)	Academy	3 November 2023	Trainee	30 June 2024
Forwards
11	Mason Bennett	LW	(England)	Langwith	15 July 1996 (age 30)	Millwall	1 July 2023	Free	30 June 2025
15	Kyle Hudlin	CF	(England)	Birmingham	15 June 2000 (age 26)	Huddersfield Town	31 January 2024	Loan	31 May 2024
18	Bobby Kamwa	CF	(Cameroon)	Douala	18 March 2000 (age 26)	Leeds United	3 October 2022	Free	30 June 2024
20	Ademola Ola-Adebomi	CF	(England)	London	3 September 2003 (age 23)	Crystal Palace	25 January 2024	Loan	31 May 2024
21	Mustapha Carayol	LW	(The Gambia)	Banjul	4 September 1988 (age 38)	Gillingham	12 September 2022	Free	30 June 2024
24	Jonathan Leko	RW	(England)	(Democratic Republic of the Congo) Kinshasa	24 April 1999 (age 27)	Milton Keynes Dons	26 January 2024	Loan	31 May 2024
32	Antwoine Hackford	CF	(England)	Arbourthorne	20 March 2004 (age 22)	Sheffield United	1 February 2024	Loan	31 May 2024
35	Jakub Niemczyk	LW	(Poland)	Zielona Góra	22 January 2004 (age 22)	Academy	1 July 2022	Trainee	30 June 2024
38	Dylan Scott	CF	(England)			Academy	3 November 2023	Trainee	30 June 2024
44	Joe Hugill	CF	(England)	Durham	19 October 2003 (age 23)	Manchester United	12 January 2024	Loan	31 May 2024
Out on Loan
9	Cole Stockton	CF	(England)	Huyton	13 March 1994 (age 32)	Morecambe	1 July 2023	Free	30 June 2025
10	Josh Gordon	CF	(England)	Stoke-on-Trent	10 October 1994 (age 32)	Barrow	1 July 2023	Free	30 June 2025
14	Josh Walker	CF	(England)	London	28 December 1997 (age 28)	Dagenham & Redbridge	31 January 2023	Undisclosed	30 June 2024
19	Charlie Lakin	CM	(England)	Solihull	8 May 1999 (age 27)	Birmingham City	31 August 2021	Undisclosed	30 June 2024
27	Tom Hewlett	CF	(England)		17 October 2001 (age 25)	Academy	1 July 2020	Trainee	30 June 2024
40	William Tamen	CB	(England)			Academy	9 August 2023	Trainee	30 June 2024

== Transfers ==
=== In ===
Date	Pos	Player	Transferred from	Fee	Ref
29 June 2023	CM	Kegs Chauke (RSA)	Southampton (ENG)	Undisclosed	
1 July 2023	LW	Mason Bennett (ENG)	Millwall (ENG)	Free transfer	
1 July 2023	GK	Max Crocombe (NZL)	Grimsby Town (ENG)	Free transfer	
1 July 2023	CF	Josh Gordon (ENG)	Barrow (ENG)	Free transfer	
1 July 2023	CM	Rekeem Harper (ENG)	Ipswich Town (ENG)	Free transfer	
1 July 2023	CF	Cole Stockton (ENG)	Morecambe (ENG)	Free transfer	
3 July 2023	GK	Jamal Blackman (ENG)	Exeter City (ENG)	Free transfer	
14 July 2023	CB	Ryan Sweeney (IRL)	Dundee (SCO)	Free transfer	
18 July 2023	CB	Jasper Moon (ENG)	Barnsley (ENG)	Undisclosed	
19 July 2023	RB	Jake Caprice (ENG)	Exeter City (ENG)	Free transfer	
2 September 2023	LW	Beryly Lubala (COD)	Blackpool (ENG)	Free transfer	
9 February 2024	CB	Aristote Nsiala (COD)	Free agent	—N/a	

=== Out ===
Date	Pos	Player	Transferred to	Fee	Ref
30 June 2023	LB	Cameron Borthwick-Jackson (ENG)	Śląsk Wrocław (POL)	Released	
30 June 2023	GK	Ben Garratt (ENG)	Nantwich Town (ENG)	Released	
30 June 2023	GK	Callum Hawkins (ENG)	Leamington (ENG)	Released	
30 June 2023	LB	William Kokolo (FRA)	Swindon Town (ENG)	Released	
30 June 2023	LB	Thierry Latty-Fairweather (ENG)	York City (ENG)	Released	
30 June 2023	GK	Craig MacGillivray (SCO)	Milton Keynes Dons (ENG)	Free transfer	
30 June 2023	CB	Michael Mancienne (SEY)	Retired		
30 June 2023	DM	Chris McCann (IRL)	1874 Northwich (ENG)	Released	
30 June 2023	CF	Louis Moult (ENG)	Dundee United (SCO)	Released	
30 June 2023	DM	Ben Radcliffe (ENG)	Derby County (ENG)	Released	
30 June 2023	CB	Conor Shaughnessy (IRL)	Portsmouth (ENG)	Free transfer	
30 June 2023	RW	Jonny Smith (ENG)	Wigan Athletic (ENG)	Released	
30 June 2023	DM	Terry Taylor (WAL)	Charlton Athletic (ENG)	Undisclosed	
30 June 2023	CF	Sam Winnall (ENG)	Retired		
30 January 2024	LW	Beryly Lubala (COD)	Wycombe Wanderers (ENG)	Free transfer	

=== Loaned in ===
Date	Pos	Player	Loaned from	Until	Ref
14 July 2023	LB	Steve Seddon (ENG)	Oxford United (ENG)	End of season	
18 August 2023	LW	Kwadwo Baah (GER)	Watford (ENG)	11 January 2024 (Note: On 11 January, Baah's loan from Watford was mutually ended early.)	
12 January 2024	CF	Joe Hugill (ENG)	Manchester United (ENG)	End of season	
23 January 2024	LB	Tolaji Bola (ENG)	Rotherham United (ENG)	End of season	
25 January 2024	CF	Ademola Ola-Adebomi (ENG)	Crystal Palace (ENG)	End of season	
26 January 2024	RW	Jonathan Leko (ENG)	Milton Keynes Dons (ENG)	End of season	
31 January 2024	CF	Kyle Hudlin (ENG)	Huddersfield Town (ENG)	End of season	
1 February 2024	CF	Antwoine Hackford (ENG)	Sheffield United (ENG)	End of season	

=== Loaned out ===
Date	Pos	Player	Loaned to	Until	Ref
4 August 2023	CB	Finn Delap (ENG)	Mickleover (ENG)	31 August 2023	
4 August 2023	CF	Tom Hewlett (ENG)	Hereford (ENG)	31 August 2023	
1 September 2023	CM	Charlie Lakin (ENG)	AFC Wimbledon (ENG)	1 January 2024	
11 January 2024	CF	Josh Gordon (ENG)	Walsall (ENG)	End of season	
11 January 2024	CM	Charlie Lakin (ENG)	Sutton United (ENG)	End of season	
17 January 2024	CF	Cole Stockton (ENG)	Barrow (ENG)	End of season	
25 January 2024	CF	Josh Walker (ENG)	Gillingham (ENG)	End of season	
2 February 2024	CB	Cameron Gilbert (ENG)	Gresley Rovers (ENG)	1 March 2024	
2 February 2024	CF	Tom Hewlett (ENG)	Stratford Town (ENG)	End of season	
2 February 2024	AM	Charlie Knowles (ENG)	Gresley Rovers (ENG)	1 March 2024	
2 February 2024	CB	William Tamen (ENG)	Mickleover (ENG)	End of season	

== Pre-season and friendlies ==
On 25 May, Burton Albion announced their first pre-season fixture, against Stoke City in the Bass Charity Vase. A day later, a second match was confirmed, against West Bromwich Albion. A third pre-season fixture was also added, against Nuneaton Borough. A fourth friendly, against Brackley Town was also scheduled for the Brewers. A short trip to face Alfreton Town was also confirmed by the club. A sixth friendly match was later added, against Crewe Alexandra. On 14 June, the club announced a seventh friendly, against Scunthorpe United.

Win Draw Loss Fixtures

1 July 2023 Friendly	Nuneaton Borough	1–1	Burton Albion	Nuneaton
14:00 BST	Stenson 7'	Report	Powell 35'	Stadium: FCS Stadium; Attendance: 464

8 July 2023 Friendly	Burnley	1–0	Burton Albion	Burnley
15:00 BST	Rieno Socoliche 87'	Report		Stadium: Burnley Training Ground; Attendance: 0 (Behind closed doors)

11 July 2023 Friendly	Alfreton Town	1–4	Burton Albion	Alfreton
19:30 BST	Day 18' (pen.)	Report	Chauke 16'; Gordon 26'; Walker 60'; Carayol 88'	Stadium: Impact Arena; Attendance: 338

15 July 2023 Friendly	Crewe Alexandra	2–2	Burton Albion	Crewe
15:00 BST	Long 18' (pen.); Baker-Richardson 62'	Report	Stockton 20'; Sweeney 45'	Stadium: Mornflake Stadium; Attendance: 1,460; Referee: Oliver Langford

18 July 2023 Friendly	Brackley Town	2–2	Burton Albion	Brackley
19:30 BST	Bates 46', 50'	Report	Helm 7', 42'	Stadium: St James Park

22 July 2023 Friendly	Burton Albion	2–2	West Bromwich Albion	Burton upon Trent
15:00 BST	Stockton 20'; Kamwa 89'	Report	Pieters 15'; Phillips 37'	Stadium: Pirelli Stadium; Attendance: 2,633; Referee: Tom Reeves

25 July 2023 Bass Charity Vase	Burton Albion	0–1	Stoke City	Burton upon Trent
19:45 BST		Report	Brown 54'	Stadium: Pirelli Stadium; Attendance: 2,295; Referee: James Oldham

26 July 2023 Friendly	Belper Town	2–4	Burton Albion	Belper
19:45 BST	Dunn 61'; Bastos 75' (pen.)	Report	Gilligan 30'; Crocombe (red card) 60'; Lakin 80'; Walker 85' (pen.); Carayol 87'	Stadium: Christchurch Meadow; Attendance: 351

29 July 2023 Friendly	Scunthorpe United	2–1	Burton Albion	Scunthorpe
15:00 BST	Elliott 18'; Butterfield 84'	Report	Gordon 21'	Stadium: Glanford Park; Attendance: 1,220

== Competitions ==
=== Overall record ===
Competition	First match	Last match	Starting round	Final position	Record							
Competition	First match	Last match	Starting round	Final position	Pld	W	D	L	GF	GA	GD	Win %
League One	5 August		Matchday 1		44	11	10	23	36	62	−26	25.00
FA Cup	4 November	14 November	First round	First Round	2	0	1	1	0	2	−2	0.00
EFL Cup	9 August	9 August	First round	First round	1	0	0	1	0	2	−2	0.00
EFL Trophy	26 September	10 January	Group stage	Third round	5	3	0	2	9	7	+2	60.00
Total					52	14	11	27	45	73	−28	26.92

Last updated: 1 April 2024
Source: Soccerway

=== League One ===
==== League table ====
Pos	Team	Pld	W	D	L	GF	GA	GD	Pts	Promotion, qualification or relegation
17	Reading	46	16	11	19	68	70	−2	53 (Note: On 16 August 2023, Reading were deducted one point for failing to pay players on time and in full on three occasions in the 2022–23 season. Another 3-point deduction was applied on 13 September, for failing to deposit wages on time. Another 2-point deduction was applied on 27 February, due to late HMRC payments.)	
18	Cambridge United	46	12	12	22	39	61	−22	48	
19	Shrewsbury Town	46	13	9	24	35	67	−32	48	
20	Burton Albion	46	12	10	24	39	67	−28	46	
21	Cheltenham Town (R)	46	12	8	26	41	65	−24	44	Relegation to EFL League Two
22	Fleetwood Town (R)	46	10	13	23	49	72	−23	43	Relegation to EFL League Two
23	Port Vale (R)	46	10	11	25	41	74	−33	41	Relegation to EFL League Two

Source: EFL Official Website
Rules for classification: 1) Points; 2) Goal difference; 3) Number of goals scored; 4) Head-to-head results; 5) Wins; 6) Away goals; 7) Penalty points (sec 9.5); 8) 12-point sending off offences
(R) Relegated

==== Results summary ====
Overall								Home						Away					
Pld	W	D	L	GF	GA	GD	Pts	W	D	L	GF	GA	GD	W	D	L	GF	GA	GD
46	12	10	24	39	67	−28	46	7	5	12	22	33	−11	5	5	12	17	34	−17

Last updated: 20 April 2024.
Source: Soccerway

==== Results by round ====
Round	1	2	3	4	5	6	8	7^{1}	9	10	11	12	13	14	15	16	17	19	20	21	22	23	24	25	26	27	28	29	30	31	32	34	35	33^{3}	36	37	38	39	40	41	42	43	14	18^{2}	45	46
Ground	A	H	A	A	H	H	A	A	H	A	H	H	A	H	A	H	A	A	H	H	A	A	H	H	A	H	A	H	A	H	A	A	H	H	A	H	A	A	H	A	H	H	A	H	H	A
Result	L	L	L	D	D	L	L	W	D	D	W	W	W	W	L	D	L	L	L	L	L	D	W	W	L	D	L	W	D	L	W	W	L	L	D	L	L	L	L	D	L	L	W	L	W	L
Position	19	21	23	24	22	22	22	22	20	20	18	18	13	9	11	11	13	17	17	19	19	19	18	16	19	17	19	15	17	17	17	17	18	17	17	20	19	19	19	20	20	20	20	20	20	20

Updated to match(es) played on 20 April 2024. Source: Soccerway
A = Away; H = Home; W = Win; D = Draw; L = Loss; P = Postponed
Notes:
- ^{1} Matchday 7 (vs Port Vale) was postponed due to the international call-ups.
- ^{2} Matchday 18 (vs Cheltenham Town) was postponed due to the international call-ups.
- ^{3} Matchday 33 (vs Carlisle United) was postponed due to a waterlogged pitch.

==== Matches ====
On 22 June, the EFL League One fixtures were released.

Win Draw Loss Fixtures

5 August 2023 1	Blackpool	2–0	Burton Albion	Blackpool
15:00 BST	Beesley (yellow card) 14'; Lavery 19', 25'; Norburn (yellow card) 32'; Connolly (yellow card) 67'; Dougall (yellow card) 89'	Report	Brayford (yellow card) 6'	Stadium: Bloomfield Road; Attendance: 10,943; Referee: Seb Stockbridge

12 August 2023 2	Burton Albion	0–3	Derby County	Burton upon Trent
15:00 BST	Seddon (yellow card) 2'	Report	Collins 7'; Mendez-Laing (yellow card) 45+2'; Hourihane (yellow card) 68' (goal) 78'; Washington 84'; Cashin (yellow card) 90+6'	Stadium: Pirelli Stadium; Attendance: 6,410; Referee: James Bell

15 August 2023 3	Shrewsbury Town	2–1	Burton Albion	Shrewsbury
19:45 BST	Bayliss 3'; Dunkley 45+4'; Benning (yellow card) 83'	Report	Blackman (yellow card) 4'; Brayford (yellow card) 72'; Oshilaja (yellow card) 76'; Chauke (yellow card) 79'; Bennett 90+7'	Stadium: Crowd Meadow; Attendance: 5,477; Referee: Scott Oldham

19 August 2023 4	Wycombe Wanderers	0–0	Burton Albion	High Wycombe
15:00 BST	Low (yellow card) 27'; Scowen (yellow card) 57'	Report	Caprice (yellow card) 85'; Crocombe (yellow card) 90+2'	Stadium: Adams Park; Attendance: 4,024; Referee: Thomas Kirk

26 August 2023 5	Burton Albion	1–1	Bolton Wanderers	Burton upon Trent
15:00 BST	Harper (yellow card) 15'; Helm 46'; Oshilaja (yellow card) 56'; Crocombe (yellow card) 57'; Caprice (yellow card) 74'; Moon (yellow card) 84'; Carayol (yellow card) 87'	Report	Maghoma (yellow card) 20'; Thomason (yellow card) 44'; Charles 58'	Stadium: Pirelli Stadium; Attendance: 3,711; Referee: Carl Brook

2 September 2023 6	Burton Albion	0–1	Exeter City	Burton upon Trent
15:00 BST	Powell (yellow card) 26'; Moon (yellow card) 59'; Seddon (yellow card) 81' (yellow-red card) 90+4'	Report	Cole (yellow card) 45+3'; Trevitt 75'	Stadium: Pirelli Stadium; Attendance: 2,613; Referee: Geoff Eltringham

16 September 2023 8	Barnsley	2–0	Burton Albion	Barnsley
15:00 BST	Cole 21', 68'	Report		Stadium: Oakwell Stadium; Referee: Marc Edwards

19 September 2023 7	Port Vale	2–3	Burton Albion	Burslem
18:45 BST	Garrity 40'; Clark (yellow card) 64'; Ripley (yellow card) 70'; Arblaster 86'	Report	Lubala 11'; Hughes (yellow card) 17'; Seddon 51'; Baah 61'; Helm (yellow card) 75'; Powell (yellow card) 90'	Stadium: Vale Park; Attendance: 5,993; Referee: Ben Toner
Note: Fixture was previous postponed due to international call-ups.

23 September 2023 9	Burton Albion	1–1	Fleetwood Town	Burton upon Trent
15:00 BST	Powell (penalty missed) 17' 17'; Crocombe (yellow card) 42'; Walker (yellow card) 80'	Report	Quitirna 19'	Stadium: Pirelli Stadium; Attendance: 2,750; Referee: Ollie Yates

30 September 2023 10	Reading	0–0	Burton Albion	Reading
15:00 BST (UTC+1)	McIntyre (yellow card) 44'	Report	Baah (yellow card) 45+12'; Hamer (yellow card) 50'; Seddon (yellow card) 66'; Powell (yellow card) 90+2'	Stadium: Select Car Leasing Stadium; Attendance: 13,554; Referee: Sam Purkiss

3 October 2023 11	Burton Albion	2–1	Wigan Athletic	Burton upon Trent
19:45 BST	Lubala (yellow card) 22' (yellow-red card) 89'; Gordon (yellow card) 26'; Powell 68', 84' (pen.); Bennett (yellow card) 90+3'	Report	Adeeko (yellow card) 21'; Hughes 44'; Clare (yellow card) 57'; Humphrys (yellow card) 88'	Stadium: Pirelli Stadium; Attendance: 2,527; Referee: Sunny Gill

9 October 2023 12	Burton Albion	2–1	Cambridge United	Burton upon Trent
20:00 BST	Walker 10'; Oshilaja 31'; Baah (yellow card) 53'; Bennett (yellow card) 90'	Report	Okenabirhie 67'	Stadium: Pirelli Stadium; Attendance: 2,296; Referee: Ben Speedie

14 October 2023 13	Lincoln City	0–1	Burton Albion	Lincoln
15:00 BST	Mandroiu (red card) 55'; Erhahon (yellow card) 80'	Report	Powell (yellow card) 26'; Hughes (yellow card) 53'; Sweeney (yellow card) 55'; Burroughs 58' (o.g.); Baah (yellow card) 81'	Stadium: LNER Stadium; Attendance: 7,776; Referee: Rebecca Welch

21 October 2023 14	Burton Albion	4–1	Bristol Rovers	Burton upon Trent
15:00 BST	Jasper Moon (yellow card) 18'; Beryly Lubala 26'; Beryly Lubala 43'; Max Crocombe (yellow card) 70'; Joe Powell 81'; Kwadwo Baah 84'; Mark Helm (yellow card) 88'	Report	Antony Evans 7'; Ryan Woods (red card) 64'; Lamare Bogarde (yellow card) 90+2'	Stadium: Pirelli Stadium; Attendance: 3,591; Referee: Christopher Pollard

24 October 2023 15	Carlisle United	2–1	Burton Albion	Carlisle
19:45 GMT	Gibson 53'; Garner (yellow card) 77' (goal) 88'	Report	Hamer (yellow card) 25'; Helm 28' (yellow card) 36'; Lubala (yellow card) 77'	Stadium: Brunton Park; Attendance: 6,390; Referee: Ross Joyce

28 October 2023 16	Burton Albion	0–0	Leyton Orient	Burton upon Trent
15:00 GMT	Oshilaja (yellow card) 59'	Report	Brown (yellow card) 72'	Stadium: Pirelli Stadium; Attendance: 3,359; Referee: Charles Breakspear

11 November 2023 17	Northampton Town	2–0	Burton Albion	Northampton
15:00 GMT	Leonard 54'; Hoskins 78'	Report	Powell (yellow card) 25'; Lubala (yellow card) 90'	Stadium: Sixfields Stadium; Attendance: 6,640; Referee: Scott Jackson

15 November 2023 19	Peterborough United	4–0	Burton Albion	Peterborough
15:00 GMT	Randall 6'; Mason-Clark 44'; Jones (yellow card) 52'; Stockton 61' (o.g.); Poku 66'	Report	Helm (yellow card) 9'; Oshilaja (yellow card) 37'; Stockton (yellow card) 54'	Stadium: Weston Homes Stadium; Referee: Alan Young

28 November 2023 20	Burton Albion	0–2	Portsmouth	Burton upon Trent
19:45 GMT	Baah (yellow card) 19'; Seddon (yellow card) 70' (yellow-red card) 90'	Report	Bishop 38' (pen.); Robertson 63'	Stadium: Pirelli Stadium; Attendance: 2,749; Referee: Scott Oldham

9 December 2023 21	Burton Albion	1–2	Stevenage	Burton upon Trent
15:00 GMT	Powell (penalty missed) 7; Oshilaja 7' (yellow card) 77'; Stockton (yellow card) 66'; Hughes (yellow card) 90+3'	Report	Hemmings 45+1'; Reid 51' (pen.); Neal (yellow card) 61'; Forster-Caskey (yellow card) 63'	Stadium: Pirelli Stadium; Attendance: 2,406; Referee: Ben Atkinson

16 December 2023 22	Oxford United	3–0	Burton Albion	Oxford
15:00 GMT	Rodrigues 25', 83'; McGuane 89'	Report	Gordon (yellow card) 74'	Stadium: The Kassam Stadium; Attendance: 7,438; Referee: Martin Woods

23 December 2023 23	Charlton Athletic	1–1	Burton Albion	Charlton
15:00 GMT	Jones 19' (yellow card) 78'; Dobson (yellow card) 63'	Report	Carayol (yellow card) 67'; Kamwa (yellow card) 87'; Sweeney 90+1'	Stadium: The Valley; Attendance: 12,210; Referee: Lee Swabey

26 December 2023 24	Burton Albion	1–0	Blackpool	Burton upon Trent
15:00 GMT	Kamwa 10', (yellow card) 21'; Oshilaja (yellow card) 28'	Report	Norburn (yellow card) 57'	Stadium: Pirelli Stadium; Attendance: 4,196; Referee: Scott Simpson

29 December 2023 25	Burton Albion	1–0	Shrewsbury Town	Burton upon Trent
19:45 GMT	Lubala 16'; Oshilaja (yellow card) 67'; Crocombe (yellow card) 84'	Report	Kenneh (yellow card) 83'	Stadium: Pirelli Stadium; Attendance: 3,102; Referee: Carl Brook

1 January 2024 26	Bolton Wanderers	1–0	Burton Albion	Bolton
15:00 GMT	Moon 51' (o.g.); Morley (yellow card) 86'	Report	Baah (yellow card) 57'; Gilligan (yellow card) 65'	Stadium: Toughsheet Community Stadium; Attendance: 20,259; Referee: Darren Drysdale

6 January 2024 27	Burton Albion	1–1	Wycombe Wanderers	Burton upon Trent
15:00 GMT	Lubala (yellow card) 30', (goal) 57'; Sweeney (yellow card) 48'	Report	Sadlier (yellow card) 15'; Vokes 67'; Wheeler (yellow card) 87'	Stadium: Pirelli Stadium; Attendance: 3,044; Referee: David Rock

15 January 2024 28	Derby County	3–2	Burton Albion	Derby
20:00 GMT	Barkhuizen 29'; Collins 49'; Hourihane 90+3'	Report	Seddon 54'; Oshilaja (yellow card) 64'; Hugill 65'	Stadium: Pride Park Stadium; Referee: Ben Toner
Note: Fixture was previously scheduled for 13 January, but was moved for TV coverage.

20 January 2024 29	Burton Albion	2–0	Charlton Athletic	Burton upon Trent
15:00 GMT	Bennett (yellow card) 5'; Helm 24' (yellow card) 42'; Brayford 47'	Report	Thomas (yellow card) 35'; May (yellow card) 90+7'	Stadium: Pirelli Stadium; Referee: Alan Young

27 January 2024 30	Cambridge United	0–0	Burton Albion	Cambridge
15:00 GMT	Morrison (yellow card) 45+1'; Andrew (yellow card) 56'; Taylor (yellow card) 90+4'; Lankester (yellow card) 90+10'	Report	Moon (yellow card) 20'; Seddon (yellow card) 64' (yellow-red card) 64'; Oshilaja (yellow card) 69'; Carayol (yellow card) 74'; Bennett (yellow card) 87'; Crocombe (yellow card) 90+7'	Stadium: Cledara Abbey Stadium; Referee: Edward Duckworth

3 February 2024 31	Burton Albion	0–1	Lincoln City	Burton upon Trent
15:00 GMT	Moon (yellow card) 6'; Oshilaja (yellow card) 17'; Brayford (yellow card) 20'; Powell (yellow card) 45+1'; Sweeney (yellow card) 49'; Bola (yellow card) 67'; Kamwa (yellow card) 74'; Ola-Adebomi (yellow card) 90+7'	Report	Mitchell (yellow card) 23' (yellow-red card) 29'; Hackett-Fairchild 54'; House (yellow card) 90+3'; Sørensen (yellow card) 90+6'	Stadium: Pirelli Stadium; Attendance: 3,995; Referee: Jeremy Simpson

10 February 2024 32	Bristol Rovers	1–2	Burton Albion	Horfield
15:00 GMT	Evans 60'	Report	Gilligan 43' (yellow card) 52'; Bola (yellow card) 49'; Helm 57' (yellow card) 64'; Bennett (yellow card) 80'	Stadium: Memorial Stadium; Attendance: 7,855; Referee: Sam Purkiss

17 February 2024 34	Leyton Orient	1–2	Burton Albion	Leyton
15:00 GMT	Galbraith (yellow card) 26'; Moncur 43' (pen.)	Report	Nsiala (yellow card) 42' (goal) 76'; Bennett 72'	Stadium: Gaughan Group Stadium; Attendance: 7,167; Referee: Paul Howard

24 February 2024 35	Burton Albion	0–2	Northampton Town	Burton upon Trent
15:00 GMT		Report	Leonard 22', (yellow card) 90+4'; Pinnock 36'; Moulden (yellow card) 47'	Stadium: Pirelli Stadium; Attendance: 3,953; Referee: Tom Reeves

27 February 2024 33	Burton Albion	0–1	Carlisle United	Burton upon Trent
19:45 GMT		Report	Diamond (yellow card) 12'; Huntington 27'; Vela (yellow card) 86'	Stadium: Pirelli Stadium; Attendance: 2,247; Referee: Craig Hicks
Note: Fixture was originally scheduled for 13 February, but was postponed due to a waterlogged pitch.

2 March 2024 36	Cheltenham Town	0–0	Burton Albion	Cheltenham
15:00 GMT	Ferry (yellow card) 88'	Report	Sweeney (yellow card) 35'; Powell (yellow card) 44'; Oshilaja (yellow card) 50'; Crocombe (yellow card) 71'	Stadium: The Completely-Suzuki Stadium; Attendance: 4,133; Referee: Thomas Parsons

9 March 2024 37	Burton Albion	1–3	Peterborough United	Burton upon Trent
15:00 GMT	Oshilaja (yellow card) 46'; Ola-Adebomi 70'; Hamer (yellow card) 87'	Report	Jones 56'; Katongo (yellow card) 61'; Knight 88'; Clarke-Harris 90+6'	Stadium: Pirelli Stadium; Attendance: 3,641; Referee: Ross Joyce

12 March 2024 38	Portsmouth	2–1	Burton Albion	Portsmouth
19:45 GMT	Yengi 45+3' (pen.), 63'	Report	Helm (yellow card) 14'; Brayford (yellow card) 24' (goal) 81'; Crocombe (yellow card) 34'; Carayol (yellow card) 83'; Sweeney (yellow card) 90+3'	Stadium: Fratton Park; Attendance: 19,536; Referee: Adam Herczeg

16 March 2024 39	Exeter City	1–0	Burton Albion	Exeter
15:00 GMT	Sweeney (yellow card) 30'; Cole 41', (yellow card) 83'; Aitchison (yellow card) 43'; Jules (red card) 45+6'; Carroll (yellow card) 65'	Report	Caprice (yellow card) 2'; Harper (yellow card) 55'; Carayol (yellow card) 83'	Stadium: St James Park; Attendance: 6,188; Referee: Martin Woods

23 March 2024 40	Burton Albion	0–1	Port Vale	Burton upon Trent
15:00 GMT	Nsiala (yellow card) 28'; Hamer (yellow card) 74'	Report	Loft 83'	Stadium: Pirelli Stadium; Attendance: 3,757; Referee: David Rock

29 March 2024 41	Wigan Athletic	1–1	Burton Albion	Wigan
15:00 GMT	Hughes 43' (o.g.); Smith (yellow card) 79'	Report	Brayford 54'; Gilligan (yellow card) 75'; Powell (yellow card) 90+1'; Hamer (yellow card) 90+4'	Stadium: DW Stadium; Attendance: 11,426; Referee: Darren Drysdale

1 April 2024 42	Burton Albion	1–3	Barnsley	Burton upon Trent
15:00 BST	Powell 37'	Report	McAtee 54', 64'; Connell 69'	Stadium: Pirelli Stadium; Attendance: 4,024; Referee: Martin Coy

6 April 2024 43	Burton Albion	0–4	Oxford United	Burton upon Trent
15:00 BST	Powell (yellow card) 50'; Brayford (yellow card) 83'	Report	Harris 24', 57'; Murphy 62'; Henry 69'	Stadium: Pirelli Stadium; Attendance: 3,700; Referee: Will Finnie

13 April 2024 44	Stevenage	1–2	Burton Albion	Stevenage
15:00 BST	Butler (red card) 61'; Thompson (yellow card) 75'; Hemmings 88', (yellow card) 90+4'	Report	Oshilaja (yellow card) 21'; Helm 45+1', (yellow card) 61'; Hamer (yellow card) 71', (goal) 76'	Stadium: Broadhall Way; Attendance: 4,040; Referee: Ben Toner

16 April 2024 18	Burton Albion	1–2	Cheltenham Town	Burton upon Trent
19:45 BST	Moon (yellow card) 34'; Seddon 45+4'; Nsiala (yellow card) 50'; Crocombe (yellow card) 86'	Report	Taylor 51'; Davies 71'; Ferry (yellow card) 84'	Stadium: Pirelli Stadium; Attendance: 3,020; Referee: Ben Speedie
Note: Fixture was originally scheduled for 18 November and 5 February, but was postponed due to international call-ups and waterlogged pitch respectively.

20 April 2024 45	Burton Albion	3–2	Reading	Burton upon Trent
15:00 BST	Bennett 5', (yellow card) 75'; Carayol 11'; Kamwa 42'; Ola-Adebomi (yellow card) 90+7'	Report	Wing 34'; Smith 59' (pen.)	Stadium: Pirelli Stadium; Attendance: 4,487; Referee: Scott Oldham

27 April 2024 46	Fleetwood Town	3–0	Burton Albion	Fleetwood
15:00 BST	Johnston 17'; Patterson 31'; Lonergan 76'	Report		Stadium: Highbury Stadium; Attendance: 3,397; Referee: Simon Mather

=== FA Cup ===
Burton were drawn away to Port Vale in the first round.

Win Draw Loss Fixtures

4 November 2023 First round	Port Vale	0–0	Burton Albion	Burslem
15:00 GMT	Smith (red card) 18'	Report	Sweeney (yellow card) 2'; Oshilaja (yellow card) 43'; Powell (yellow card) 45'; Walker (yellow card) 64'	Stadium: Vale Park; Attendance: 4,245; Referee: Simon Mather

14 November 2023 First round replay	Burton Albion	0–2	Port Vale	Burton upon Trent
19:45 GMT	Lubala (yellow card) 15'; Hamer (yellow card) 18'	Report	Massey 31'; Cass 82'	Stadium: Pirelli Stadium; Attendance: 2,533; Referee: Adam Herczeg

=== EFL Cup ===
Brewers were drawn at home to Leicester City in the first round.

Win Draw Loss Fixtures

9 August 2023 First round	Burton Albion	0–2	Leicester City	Burton upon Trent
20:00 BST		Report	Iheanacho 6'; Ndidi 45+2'	Stadium: Pirelli Stadium; Attendance: 4,631; Referee: Gavin Ward
Note: Live on Sky Sports

=== EFL Trophy ===
In the group stage, Burton were drawn in Northern Group H alongside Mansfield Town, Doncaster Rovers and Everton U21. After finishing second in the group stages, they were drawn away to Wrexham in the second round and Blackpool in the third round.

Pos	Div	Team	Pld	W	PW	PL	L	GF	GA	GD	Pts	Qualification
1	L2	Doncaster Rovers	3	2	0	0	1	6	4	+2	6	Advance to Round 2
2	L1	Burton Albion	3	2	0	0	1	5	3	+2	6	Advance to Round 2
3	L2	Mansfield Town	3	1	0	0	2	4	5	−1	3	
4	ACA	Everton U21	3	1	0	0	2	1	4	−3	3	

Updated to match(es) played on 7 November 2023. Source: EFL.com

Win Draw Loss Fixtures

26 September 2023 Group stage	Burton Albion	2–0	Everton U21	Burton upon Trent
19:00 BST	Bennett 8'; Oshilaja 20'; Gordon (yellow card) 90+4'	Report	Djankpata (yellow card) 68'; Metcalfe (yellow card) 77'	Stadium: Pirelli Stadium; Attendance: 473; Referee: Scott Tallis

7 November 2023 Group stage	Doncaster Rovers	2–1	Burton Albion	Doncaster
19:15 GMT	Faal 18'; Hurst 55'; Biggins (yellow card) 75'; Senior (yellow card) 77'; Anderson (yellow card) 90+2'	Report	Gilligan (yellow card) 12'; Gordon (yellow card) 45'; Lubala 84'; Seddon (yellow card) 89'	Stadium: Eco-Power Stadium; Attendance: 1,068; Referee: Matthew Corlett

21 November 2023 Group stage	Burton Albion	2–1	Mansfield Town	Burton upon Trent
19:00 GMT	Oshilaja (yellow card) 34'; Stockton 34'; Hamer 53'	Report	Cooper 21'; Flint (yellow card) 83'; Bowery (yellow card) 86'; Boateng (yellow card) 90+4'	Stadium: Pirelli Stadium; Attendance: 855; Referee: Paul Howard

5 December 2023 Second round	Wrexham	2–3	Burton Albion	Wrexham
19:00 GMT	Dalby 5'; Davies (yellow card) 26' (goal) 90+2'	Report	Oshilaja 1'; Helm 3'; Sweeney (yellow card) 36' (goal) 64'; Hughes (yellow card) 90+4'	Stadium: STōK Cae Ras; Attendance: 4,963; Referee: Scott Tallis

10 January 2024 Third round	Blackpool	2–1	Burton Albion	Blackpool
19:00 GMT	Virtue 4'; Ekpiteta 67'; Dale (yellow card) 90+5'	Report	Brayford (yellow card) 69'; Scott 71'	Stadium: Bloomfield Road; Referee: Peter Wright
