= William Tamen =

English footballer (born 2006)

Personal information
- Full name: William Nkwawu Tamen
- Date of birth: 12 May 2006 (age 20)
- Place of birth: Leicester, England
- Position: Centre-back

Team information
- Current team: Everton
- Number: 48

Youth career
- –2022: Don't Just Kick It Academy
- 2022–2023: Burton Albion

Senior career*
Years	Team	Apps	(Gls)
2023–2024	Burton Albion	1	(0)
2024	→ Mickleover (loan)	11	(0)
2024–	Everton	0	(0)
2026	→ Tranmere Rovers (loan)	10	(0)
- * Club domestic league appearances and goals as of 08:56, 29 May 2026 (UTC)

William Nkwawu Tamen (born 12 May 2006) is an English professional footballer who plays as a centre-back for Premier League club Everton.

== Career ==
=== Burton Albion ===
Tamen joined Burton Albion from Don't Just Kick It Academy in November 2022. On 26 September 2023, he made his first team debut coming on as a substitute against Everton U21 in the EFL Trophy. Two days later, he signed his first professional contract with the club. On 25 November 2023, he made his professional league debut, starting in a 4–0 loss away to Peterborough United. In February 2024, he joined Southern League side Mickleover on loan until the end of the season. He made 12 appearances in all competitions during the loan spell.

=== Everton ===
On 13 August 2024, Tamen joined Premier League club Everton for an undisclosed fee, signing a three-year deal. His first season at Everton was heavily interrupted by a foot injury which required surgery.

On 16 January 2026, Tamen joined League Two side Tranmere Rovers on loan until the end of the season. A day later, he made his debut, playing the full match in a 3–1 loss against Walsall.

== Career statistics ==
As of match played 14 August 2024

Appearances and goals by club, season and competition
Club	Season	League			FA Cup		EFL Cup		Other		Total	
Club	Season	Division	Apps	Goals	Apps	Goals	Apps	Goals	Apps	Goals	Apps	Goals
Burton Albion	2023–24	League One	1	0	0	0	0	0	2	0	3	0
Mickleover	2023–24	Southern League Premier Division Central	11	0	0	0	0	0	1	0	12	0
Everton	2024–25	Premier League	0	0	0	0	0	0	0	0	0	0
Career total			12	0	0	0	0	0	3	0	15	0
