= Mustapha Carayol =

Gambian footballer (born 1988)

Personal information
- Full name: Mustapha Soon Carayol
- Date of birth: 4 September 1988 (age 38)
- Place of birth: Banjul, Gambia
- Height: 5 ft 10 in (1.77 m)
- Position: Winger

Team information
- Current team: Peterborough Sports
- Number: 18

Youth career
- Swindon Town
- Macclesfield Town

Senior career*
Years	Team	Apps	(Gls)
2007–2008	Milton Keynes Dons	0	(0)
2007–2008	→ Crawley Town (loan)	25	(2)
2008–2010	Torquay United	50	(6)
2009	→ Kettering Town (loan)	5	(0)
2010–2011	Lincoln City	33	(3)
2011–2012	Bristol Rovers	30	(4)
2012–2016	Middlesbrough	50	(11)
2015	→ Brighton & Hove Albion (loan)	5	(0)
2015–2016	→ Huddersfield Town (loan)	15	(3)
2016	→ Leeds United (loan)	12	(1)
2016–2018	Nottingham Forest	34	(2)
2018	Ipswich Town	8	(1)
2018–2019	Apollon Limassol	14	(2)
2019–2020	Adana Demirspor	8	(1)
2021–2022	Gillingham	22	(1)
2022–2024	Burton Albion	53	(1)
2024–2025	Exeter City	6	(0)
2025	Wealdstone	12	(1)
2025–	Peterborough Sports	1	(0)

International career^{‡}
2015–2018	Gambia	7	(2)
- * Club domestic league appearances and goals as of 13:30, 6 June 2025 (UTC) ‡ National team caps and goals as of 13:58, 27 April 2019 (UTC)

Mustapha Soon Carayol (born 4 September 1988) is a retired Gambian professional footballer who most recently played as a winger for National League North club Peterborough Sports. He also represented the Gambia national team.

He has notably played in the EFL Championship for Middlesbrough, Brighton & Hove Albion, Huddersfield Town, Leeds United, Nottingham Forest and Ipswich Town. He also played in Cyprus and Turkey for Apollon Limassol and Adana Demirspor and in the Football League for Milton Keynes Dons, Torquay United, Lincoln City, Bristol Rovers, Gillingham and Burton Albion, as well as several spells with non-league clubs Crawley Town and Kettering Town.

He announced his retirement on 2 November 2026.

== Club career ==
=== Early career ===
Born in Banjul, Carayol began his career as a youth player with Swindon Town and when Paul Ince moved from Swindon to become manager of Macclesfield Town in 2006 he took Carayol with him as a trainee. At the time he was quoted as saying "I'm happy to clean the whole first team's boots all season for this opportunity".

When Ince became manager of Milton Keynes Dons in 2007, he signed Carayol again, offering him his first professional contract. He made his first team debut for MK Dons against Sheffield United in the League Cup on 28 August 2007 and went on to appear in one further cup game.

In October 2007, Carayol joined Crawley Town on loan to gain further first team experience. It came after Carayol played against them at the Crawley training ground the week before. Carayol made his Crawley Town debut, which he scored, in a 1–1 draw against Aldershot Town. Soon after, Carayol's loan spell with Crawley Town was soon extended for another month and again until the end of the season. Carayol then scored two more goals against Grays Athletic and Stafford Rangers.

=== Torquay United ===
On 13 July 2008, he was signed by Torquay United on a two–year contract.

Carayol made his Torquay United debut, in the opening game of the season, where he came on as a substitute for Danny Stevens in the 68th minute, in a 1–1 draw against Histon. In his first season at Torquay United, Carayol made thirty appearances for the club and helped the club reach promotion back to League Two.

The following season saw Carayol making his first appearance of the season on 15 August 2009, coming on as a substitute for Scott Rendell in the 68th minute, and scored in a 5–3 loss against Dagenham & Redbridge. Carayol's last appearance for the club before joining Kettering Town came on 12 September 2009, where he set up a goal for the club, in a 2–1 loss against Rochdale. After returning from a loan spell at Kettering Town, Carayol made his first appearance on 6 February 2010, where he played 45 minutes in the match, in a 1–0 loss against Hereford United. Carayol then scored his first goal for the club for the first time in five months, in a 1–1 draw against Cheltenham Town on 23 February 2010. Carayol went on to score four more goals against Darlington, Rochdale, Grimsby Town and Bury. Carayol later finished the 2009–10 season, making 30 appearances and scoring six times.

On 17 September 2009 he joined Kettering Town on a three-month emergency loan deal. Carayol made his Kettering Town debut the next day, in a 2–1 loss against Crawley Town. Carayol only made five appearances, due to suffering from a hamstring injury that kept him out for a month.

With his contract expiring at the end of the 2009–10 season, Carayol turned down a new contract at Torquay United, but turned it down and as a result, he was dropped from the first team in the last game of the season against Notts County, as well as, a strained relationship with Manager Paul Buckle.

=== Lincoln City ===
In May 2010, it was announced that Lincoln City had agreed terms with the player although a fee would have to be set to determine how much compensation Lincoln City must pay Torquay due to Carayol being under the age of 24. In August it was announced that a deal had been struck between the two clubs with Lincoln paying £35,000 over staged payments plus other clauses. Upon joining Lincoln City, Carayol stated the move does not have nothing to do with money or moving closer to his hometown, London, but for first team football.

Carayol scored on his debut, in the opening game of the season, in a 2–1 loss against Rotherham United. Carayol played in the next game against his former club, Torquay United, for the first time, where he received a warm reception from Torquay United supporters, which they lost 2–1. After being sidelined for two matches throughout August, due to ankle injury, Carayol returned to the first team and then scored again on 30 October 2010, in a 2–2 draw against Wycombe Wanderers and scored three weeks later on 20 November 2010, as well as, setting up two of the three goals, in a 3–1 win over Hereford United. Seven days later, on 27 November 2010, Carayol scored again in the second round of FA Cup, in a 2–2 draw against Hereford United. However, as the 2010–11 season progressed, Carayol began to have injuries plagued, which saw him restricted to 37 appearances in all competitions and Lincoln City relegated from the Football League.

Because of this, Carayol's future at Lincoln City was doubt after a clause was activated that gives him a freedom to quit the club and in May 2011 he was made available for transfer by the club after a mass clear out of players following relegation from the Football League. Upon leaving the club, Carayol thanked Lincoln City supporters and credited the club for helping him improve as a player.

=== Bristol Rovers ===
On 17 June 2011, Bristol Rovers signed Carayol for an undisclosed fee, on a two-year deal.

Carayol made his Bristol Rovers debut, in the opening game of the season, coming on as a substitute for Joe Anyinsah, in a 3–2 win over Wimbledon. After struggling to regain his starting line-up, Carayol was sent to play in the reserve and scored a hat–trick, in a 4–4 draw against Brentford Reserve on 28 September 2011. Carayol then scored his first Bristol Rovers goal in the first round of the FA Cup, in a 3–1 win over Corby Town and then scored in the second round of the FA Cup, in a 6–1 win over Totton. Two weeks later, on 16 December 2011, he scored his first league goal for the club, in a 4–1 loss against Gillingham.

His performances in League 2 attracted the attention of Championship club Barnsley who had a bid turned down for him in January. Amid the transfer speculation, Carayol suffered a groin injury and was substituted after 28 minutes into the start during a 3–2 loss against Aston Villa in the third round of the FA Cup. After weeks on the sidelines, Carayol made his return to the first team, coming on as a substitute in the 69th minute, in a 0–0 draw against Oxford United on 18 February 2012. After returning to the first team, Carayol then scored his first goal in three months, in a 1–0 win over Wimbledon on 17 March 2012. On 6 April 2012, Carayol scored again, in a 2–2 draw against Gillingham and after being sidelined for one game, he scored on his return on 14 April 2012, in a 7–1 win over Burton Albion. Two weeks later on 28 April 2012, Carayol scored a hat–trick assist, in a 5–1 win over Accrington Stanley. Carayol finished the 2011–12 season, making 35 appearances and scoring 6 times in all competition.

Despite keen to help the club reach promotion ahead of the 2012–13 season, in May 2012, however, Bristol Rovers confirmed they had turned down a 6 figure bid from an unnamed Championship club for Carayol, which rumoured to be Derby County. As a result, the club began open talks with him about extending his contract. With his future at Bristol Rovers become increasingly in doubt, there was a slim chance for Carayol staying at the club. It came after when Carayol delayed his decision to sign a new contract with Bristol Rovers.

=== Middlesbrough ===
Carayol signed for Middlesbrough on a three-year deal on 1 August 2012, for an undisclosed fee. Upon joining Middlesbrough, Carayol stated he could not wait to play second-tier football.

Carayol made his Middlesbrough debut in the first round of League Cup, in a 2–1 win against Bury. After missing the start of Middlesbrough's league campaign, due to a hamstring injury, Carayol returned in the second round of the League Cup against Gillingham on 28 August 2012, in which he scored his first goal for the club. He scored his first league goal for Middlesbrough on 15 September 2012, against Ipswich Town on his home debut, scoring in stoppage time in a 2–0 victory. However, Carayol soon suffered a knee injury that kept him out for four months. Carayol made his return team return in mid–January and then scored on his return from the first team, in a 3–2 loss against Barnsley on 9 February 2013. Then on 16 April 2013, Carayol scored in a 1–0 home win over Nottingham Forest. Carayol later finished the 2012–13 season, making 18 appearances and scoring three times.

In the 2013–14 season, Carayol scored in a 1–1 home draw with Sheffield Wednesday on 31 August 2013. Four weeks later, on 21 September 2013, he then scored again, in a 3–3 draw against AFC Bournemouth. Carayol later scored two more goals of 2013 against Leeds United and Birmingham City. Carayol then scored four more goals towards the end of the 2013–14 season against Bolton Wanderers, a brace against Blackpool and Nottingham Forest. However, on 18 March 2014, Carayol ruptured his anterior cruciate ligament against Bournemouth in a 0–0 draw, which would keep him out for the remainder of the season and also a large proportion of the following 2014/15 season. Despite the injury, Carayol finished 2013–14 season, making 33 appearances and scoring eight times in all competitions.

After his loan spell at Brighton & Hove Albion came to an end, Carayol signed a contract with the club on 28 April 2015, keeping him until 2018. However, with two years remaining on his contract, Carayol left the club by mutual consent. During his time at Middlesbrough, Carayol has become affectionately known as Muzzy.

==== Brighton & Hove Albion (loan) ====
On 26 March 2015, Carayol signed a loan contract with Brighton & Hove Albion for the rest of the season in order to regain match fitness. Carayol made his Brighton & Hove Albion debut the next day, where he played 81 minutes, in a 1–0 loss against Rotherham United. Carayol made five appearances before returning to the parent club.

==== Huddersfield Town (loan) ====
On 27 August 2015, Carayol joined fellow Football League Championship side Huddersfield Town on a season-long loan. Carayol made his début as a substitute in the 1–0 defeat to Queens Park Rangers on 29 August 2015 at the John Smith's Stadium, playing 10 minutes. He scored his first goal for the club and set up one of the goals in the 4–1 win over Bolton Wanderers on 19 September 2015. Carayol then scored two more goals against Rotherham United and Bolton Wanderers. After 15 appearances, scoring 3 league goals, Carayol's season-long loan with Huddersfield Town was cut short and he left the club at the beginning of January.

==== Leeds United (loan) ====
On 8 January 2016, Carayol joined fellow Championship side Leeds United until the end of the season. He scored on his debut appearance on 9 January 2016 against Rotherham United to help Leeds advance to the fourth round of the FA Cup. Three weeks later on 26 January 2016, Carayol scored his second goal for Leeds in a 1–1 draw with Brentford. Carayol went on to make twelve appearances for the club and despite the club keen on signing him on a permanent basis, Carayol opted to return to his parent club instead.

=== Nottingham Forest ===
After leaving Middlesbrough by mutual consent on 31 August 2016, Carayol signed for Nottingham Forest on a two–year contract that day. His Forest début followed on 11 September, starting in a 2–2 draw against Aston Villa. On 27 November Carayol praised the team spirit present among the players at the club:

"We have a good group of players here. I know every player always says this, but I felt as though I had been here for months, a week after I had signed. Everyone does make you feel welcome. There is a good spirit in this squad."

Carayol scored his first goal for the club in a 3–2 win over Reading on 22 April 2017.

Carayol made his first appearance of the 2017–18 season in an EFL Cup first round victory over Shrewsbury Town, scoring one of Forest's goals with a converted penalty, and playing the pass for the other.

On 31 January 2018, Forest announced they had mutually parted ways with Carayol.

=== Ipswich Town ===
Carayol joined Ipswich Town on 31 January 2018. He scored his first goal for Ipswich in a 1–0 win at Preston North End on 24 February 2018. He struggled with injury during the remainder of the 2017–18 season, only making 5 starts and 3 substitute appearances. He left Ipswich at the end of the season following the end of his short-term contract.

=== Apollon Limassol ===
Carayol signed for Apollon Limassol of the Cypriot First Division on a two-year contract on 4 August 2018. During his time with the club he featured in the UEFA Europa League, including a man of the match performance in a 2–1 away defeat to Lazio.

=== Adana Demirspor ===
Carayol signed for Turkish TFF First League side Adana Demirspor in July 2019.

=== Gillingham ===
In August 2021 Carayol signed for EFL League One side Gillingham on a free transfer, reuniting with Steve Evans who had been his former manager at Crawley Town and Leeds United. Following relegation to League Two, Carayol was released at the end of the 2021–22 season.

=== Burton Albion ===
On 12 September 2022, he signed for League One side Burton Albion on a short-term deal, which was later extended. Mustapha was released by the club at the end of the 2023-24 season.

=== Exeter City ===
On 20 September 2024, Carayol was signed by Exeter City on a short-term deal to provide injury cover. He departed the club in January 2025 following the expiry of his deal.

=== Wealdstone ===
On 15 March 2025, Carayol joined National League side Wealdstone. Having helped the club to survival on the final day of the season, he departed the club at the end of the 2024–25 season.

=== Peterborough Sports ===
On 6 September 2025, he joined National League North club Peterborough Sports.

== Style of play ==
Carayol can play "in either wide area, as a 10 or as a striker."

== International career ==
Carayol was eligible to play for Gambia through his father, Senegal through his mother and England by holding a British passport. In 2008, he rejected a national call-up from Gambia, citing his commitment at Torquay United but stating that he could play for the national team one day. In 2015, however, Carayol stated that it was the "right time" to commit his international future to the Gambia following a consultation from his family.

Carayol then made his Gambia debut against Uganda in a 1–1 draw on 10 June 2015. He then gained his second cap against Mauritania in March 2016, when he scored a brilliant solo goal.

== Personal life ==
Born in Banjul, Gambia, Carayol's Parents came from Gambia and his grandparents from his mother's side are from Senegal.

His grandfather and namesake was the chairman of Gambia's independence electoral commission in Banjul.

== Career statistics ==
=== Club ===
As of end of 2024–25 season

Appearances and goals by club, season and competition
Club	Season	League			National Cup		League Cup		Other		Total	
Club	Season	Division	Apps	Goals	Apps	Goals	Apps	Goals	Apps	Goals	Apps	Goals
Milton Keynes Dons	2007–08	League Two	0	0	0	0	1	0	1 (Note: Appearance in Football League Trophy)	0	2	0
Crawley Town (loan)	2007–08	Conference Premier	25	2	0	0	—		1 (Note: Appearance in FA Trophy)	0	26	2
Torquay United	2008–09	Conference Premier	30	0	3	0	—		0	0	33	0
Torquay United	2009–10	League Two	20	6	0	0	1	0	0	0	21	6
Torquay United	Total		50	6	3	0	1	0	0	0	54	6
Kettering Town (loan)	2009–10	Conference Premier	5	0	0	0	—		0	0	5	0
Lincoln City	2010–11	League Two	33	3	3	1	1	0	0	0	37	4
Bristol Rovers	2011–12	League Two	30	4	3	2	2	0	0	0	35	6
Middlesbrough	2012–13	Championship	18	3	1	0	2	1	—		21	4
Middlesbrough	2013–14	Championship	32	8	0	0	1	0	—		33	8
Middlesbrough	2014–15	Championship	0	0	0	0	0	0	0	0	0	0
Middlesbrough	2015–16	Championship	0	0	0	0	0	0	—		0	0
Middlesbrough	Total		50	11	1	0	3	1	0	0	54	12
Brighton & Hove Albion (loan)	2014–15	Championship	5	0	0	0	0	0	—		5	0
Huddersfield Town (loan)	2015–16	Championship	15	3	0	0	0	0	—		15	3
Leeds United (loan)	2015–16	Championship	12	1	2	1	0	0	—		14	2
Nottingham Forest	2016–17	Championship	19	1	1	0	1	0	—		21	1
Nottingham Forest	2017–18	Championship	15	1	1	0	1	1	—		17	2
Nottingham Forest	Total		34	2	2	0	2	1	0	0	38	3
Ipswich Town	2017–18	Championship	8	1	0	0	0	0	—		8	1
Apollon Limassol	2018–19	Cypriot First Division	10	2	0	0	—		3 (Note: Appearances in UEFA Europa League)	0	13	2
Adana Demirspor	2019–20	TFF First League	8	1	1	0	—		0	0	9	1
Gillingham	2021–22	League One	22	1	0	0	2	0	2 (Note: Appearances in EFL Trophy)	0	26	1
Burton Albion	2022–23	League One	23	0	2	0	0	0	3	2	28	2
Burton Albion	2023–24	League One	30	1	2	0	1	0	1	0	34	1
Burton Albion	Total		53	1	4	0	1	0	4	2	62	3
Exeter City	2024–25	League One	6	0	0	0	0	0	2	0	8	0
Wealdstone	2024–25	National League	12	1	0	0	—		0	0	12	1
Career total			348	39	19	4	13	2	13	2	423	47

=== International ===
As of match played 12 October 2018

Gambia
Year	Apps	Goals
2015	1	0
2016	2	1
2017	2	1
2018	2	0
Total	7	2

=== International goals ===
Scores and results list Gambia's goal tally first, score column indicates score after each Carayol goal.

No	Date	Venue	Opponent	Score	Result	Competition
1.	25 March 2016	Stade Olympique, Nouakchott, Mauritania	Mauritania	1–1	1–2	2017 Africa Cup of Nations qualification
2.	27 March 2017	Prince Moulay Abdellah Stadium, Rabat, Morocco	Central African Republic	2–1	2–1	Friendly

== Honours ==
Torquay United

- Conference Premier play-offs: 2009
