= Dylan Scott (footballer) =

English footballer (born 2005)

Personal information
- Full name: Dylan James Scott
- Date of birth: 2 November 2005 (age 20)
- Place of birth: Stone, England
- Position: Forward

Team information
- Current team: Stafford Rangers

Youth career
- 2019–2024: Burton Albion

Senior career*
Years	Team	Apps	(Gls)
2023–2025	Burton Albion	3	(0)
2024	→ Hanley Town (loan)	4	(2)
2024	→ Mickleover (loan)	5	(0)
2024	→ Hanley Town (loan)	14	(5)
2025	→ Leek Town (loan)	9	(1)
2025	Stalybridge Celtic	9	(1)
2025	→ Stafford Rangers (loan)		
2025–	Stafford Rangers		
- * Club domestic league appearances and goals as of 07:05, 19 October 2025 (UTC)

Dylan James Scott is an English professional footballer who plays as a forward for Stafford Rangers.

== Career ==
=== Burton Albion ===
Scott made his first-team debut for Burton Albion in the EFL Trophy on 7 November 2023, coming on as an 85th-minute substitute for Cole Stockton in a 2–1 defeat at Doncaster Rovers. He scored a first senior goal in another EFL Trophy tie in January 2024 as his side were defeated 2–1 by Blackpool. The following month he joined Northern Premier League West Division side Hanley Town on an initial one-month loan deal. Upon his return to his parent club, he made his league debut as a late substitute in a 1–0 home defeat to Port Vale. Following the conclusion of the 2023–24 season, he signed a first professional one-year deal.

In August 2024, Scott joined Northern Premier League Premier Division side Mickleover on a short-term loan deal.

Scott was released by the Brewers at the end of the 2024–25 season after six years at the club.

On 6 June 2025, he dropped into non-league to sign for Northern Premier League Division One West side Stalybridge Celtic. Manager Jon Macken announced on the signing, "Dylan is a really talented young striker with a lot of potential"..

After a short spell at Stalybridge Celtic, Scott moved on loan to fellow Division One West side Stafford Rangers. He made this move permanent in November 2025.

== Style of play ==
Scott is a forward.

== Personal life ==
Scott hails from Stone, Staffordshire.

He is a supporter of both Stoke City and Manchester United.

== Career statistics ==
As of match played 19 August 2025

Appearances and goals by club, season and competition
Club	Season	League			FA Cup		EFL Cup		Other		Total	
Club	Season	Division	Apps	Goals	Apps	Goals	Apps	Goals	Apps	Goals	Apps	Goals
Burton Albion	2022–23	League One	0	0	0	0	0	0	0	0	0	0
Burton Albion	2023–24	League One	3	0	0	0	0	0	2 (Note: Appearance(s) in the EFL Trophy)	1	5	1
Burton Albion	Total		3	0	0	0	0	0	2	1	5	1
Hanley Town (loan)	2023–24	NPL Division One West	4	2	—		—		0	0	4	2
Mickleover (loan)	2024–25	NPL Premier Division	5	0	—		—		—		5	0
Hanley Town (loan)	2024–25	NPL Division One West	14	5	—		—		2 (Note: One appearance in FA Trophy, one appearance and one goal in Staffordshire Senior Cup)	1	16	6
Leek Town (loan)	2024–25	NPL Premier Division	9	1	—		—		—		9	1
Stalybridge Celtic (loan)	2025–26	NPL Division One West	2	0	2	0	—		0	0	4	0
Career total			37	8	2	0	0	0	4	2	43	10
