= Max Crocombe =

New Zealand footballer (born 1993)

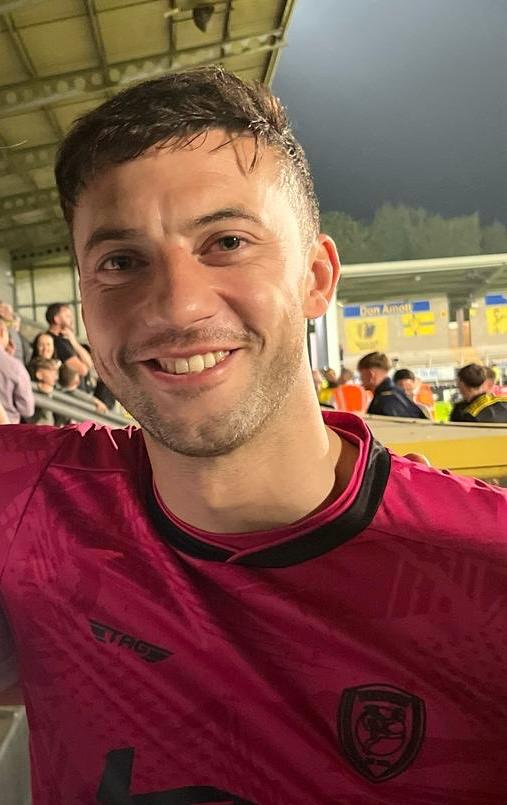
- Crocombe in 2025

Personal information
- Full name: Maxime Teremoana Crocombe
- Date of birth: 12 August 1993 (age 33)
- Place of birth: Auckland, New Zealand
- Height: 1.94 m (6 ft 4 in)
- Position: Goalkeeper

Team information
- Current team: Millwall
- Number: 15

Youth career
- Nikao Sokattak
- 2004–2009: Milton Keynes Dons
- 2010–2011: Oxford United

Senior career*
Years	Team	Apps	(Gls)
2009–2010	Buckingham Town	33	(1)
2010–2016	Oxford United	4	(0)
2011–2012	→ Banbury United (loan)	1	(0)
2015	→ Nuneaton Town (loan)	10	(0)
2015	→ Barnet (loan)	5	(0)
2015–2016	→ Southport (loan)	25	(0)
2016–2017	Carlisle United	0	(0)
2017–2019	Salford City	31	(0)
2019–2020	Brisbane Roar	6	(0)
2020–2021	Melbourne Victory	10	(0)
2021–2023	Grimsby Town	75	(0)
2023–2025	Burton Albion	86	(0)
2025–	Millwall	28	(0)

International career^{‡}
2013	New Zealand U20	4	(0)
2015	New Zealand U23	4	(0)
2018–	New Zealand	27	(0)
Medal record
Men's football
Representing New Zealand
OFC Nations Cup
Winner	2016 Papua New Guinea
Winner	2024 Fiji–Vanuatu
OFC U-20 Championship
Winner	2013 Fiji
- * Club domestic league appearances and goals as of 17 October 2026 ‡ National team caps and goals as of 27 June 2026

Maxime Teremoana Crocombe (born 12 August 1993) is a New Zealand professional footballer who plays as a goalkeeper for EFL Championship club Millwall and the New Zealand national team.

Crocombe moved to England at an early age and began his professional career with Oxford United who had signed him from non-League side Buckingham Town. He went on to play on loan with Banbury United, Nuneaton Town, Barnet and Southport before signing permanently with Carlisle United. In 2017 he moved to Salford City where he was part of the City side that won back to back promotions to the Football League. In 2019, he moved to play in the Australian A-League with spells at Brisbane Roar and Melbourne Victory.

== Early life ==
Crocombe was born in Auckland, New Zealand of Cook Islands descent, before moving to Melbourne in Australia and later England at a young age. He is the grandson of Marjorie Crocombe and Ron Crocombe. He started his career with Nikao Sokattak in the Cook Islands Round Cup before having spells with Milton Keynes Dons and Luton Town before joining Buckingham Town. Crocombe attended Oakgrove School in Milton Keynes along with fellow footballer and former Ghanaian international Jeffrey Schlupp.

== Club career ==
=== Buckingham Town ===
In the summer of 2009, Crocombe signed for Buckingham Town at the age of 16. He made 33 senior first team appearances before being spotted by scouts of Oxford United. Despite being a goalkeeper he scored one goal in his time at Buckingham Town after coming on as an outfield substitute in a 3–1 league defeat.

=== Oxford United ===
Crocombe joined Oxford United as a scholar under youth-team coach Chris Allen and signed his first professional contract in April 2012. He almost made his debut shortly afterwards after injuries to Ryan Clarke and Wayne Brown, and the termination of Connor Ripley's loan, however Oxford eventually signed Arsenal's Emiliano Martínez on loan and Crocombe had to wait for his debut. Whilst at the club, he has been coached by Alan Hodgkinson and Wayne Brown.

Crocombe's Football League debut came in a 1–1 draw with Burton Albion on 29 January 2013. He kept his first clean sheet for the club in his second league appearance, a 1–0 away win over Dagenham & Redbridge in April 2013, which ended a five-match winless run. He remained in goal for the rest of the league season, keeping three consecutive clean sheets with 3–0 wins against both Rochdale and Accrington Stanley. In total, Crocombe made six appearances for club and country in his debut professional season, conceding just one goal. In June 2013, he signed a long-term contract with the club. By the 2013–14 season he had established himself as deputy to Oxford's long-standing number 1, Ryan Clarke.

Crocombe appeared twice in the 2014–15 season, both times in the Football League Cup. In his second appearance he held Premier League side West Bromwich Albion to one goal in 120 minutes and saved their first two spot kicks in the penalty shoot-out. At the end of the season, which included a productive loan spell at Nuneaton Town, the club triggered a 2-year option in his contract to extend his stay until the end of 2017.

==== Loan to Nuneaton Town ====
In February 2015, Crocombe signed on loan at Conference Premier side Nuneaton Town until the end of the season. After impressing with a clean sheet on his debut, he was named in the Non-League Paper's Team of the Day. He did not concede a goal in any of his first 6 games and was named man of the match twice in his short spell for the club.

==== Loan to Barnet ====
Crocombe was loaned to Barnet on 18 September 2015, with the Bees without a senior keeper due to an injury and a suspension.

==== Loan to Southport ====
In October 2015 Crocombe was recalled from Barnet and sent on a three-month loan to Southport of the National League. After a series of impressive performances in his first 3 months for the club he was named Southport's Player of the Month for both November 2015 and January 2016.

=== Carlisle United ===
Crocombe left Oxford by mutual consent and signed a one-year deal with Carlisle United on 4 August 2016.

=== Salford City ===
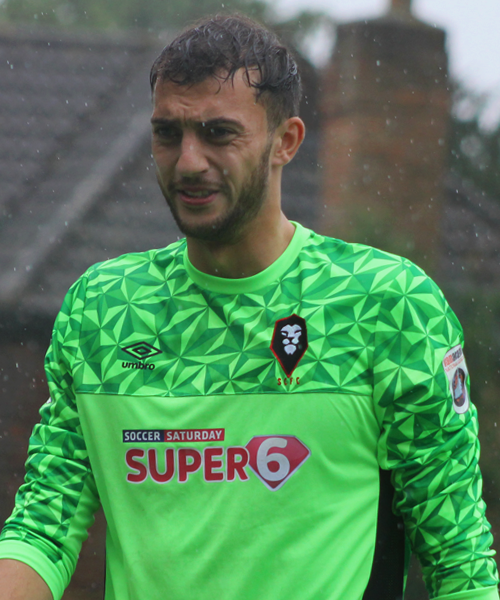
Max Crocombe playing for Salford City in 2017.

In May 2017 he joined Salford City. In October 2017 Crocombe was sent off during a match against Bradford Park Avenue for urinating at the side of a stand A spectator made a formal complaint and the incident was later reported to the police. Crocombe subsequently posted an apology on Twitter and explained "I was in a very uncomfortable position and made an error of judgement that spoiled a great win".

=== Brisbane Roar ===
In July 2019, Crocombe joined Australian A-League side Brisbane Roar to challenge Jamie Young for the starting goalkeeper position. In October 2020, Crocombe left Brisbane Roar.

=== Melbourne Victory ===
After leaving Brisbane Roar, Crocombe joined Melbourne Victory in October 2020. Crocombe began the season as the Victory's starting goalkeeper, playing in the first 10 matches of the season, before being replaced as the starting goalkeeper by Matt Acton. He was released on 11 June 2021.

=== Grimsby Town ===
On 30 July 2021, Crocombe returned to England, penning a one-year deal with Grimsby Town.

Initially being signed as a back-up keeper, Crocombe became Grimsby's first choice keeper in December at the expense of club veteran James McKeown.

On 23 May 2022, with Grimsby trailing 1–0 to Notts County in the National League play-off eliminator, in the final minute of added on time Crocombe came up for a free kick and with the ball falling to him it bounced off his knees as he prepared to shoot before dropping to Gavan Holohan who scored the equaliser, with Crocombe claiming the assist. Grimsby went on to win the game 2–1 in extra time. Crocombe played in the 2022 National League play-off final as Grimsby beat Solihull Moors 2–1 at the London Stadium to return to the Football League.

Crocombe was ever-present in goal for Grimsby's 2022–23 League Two season and cup campaigns, playing a total of 5,340 minutes, the fourth highest in world football that season. He was part of the Grimsby team that reached the quarter-finals of the 2022–23 FA Cup by beating League One clubs Plymouth Argyle, Cambridge United and Burton Albion in rounds one to three, Championship club Luton Town in a fourth round replay, and Premier League side Southampton in the fifth round. In doing so they became the first team to beat five teams from higher divisions in the history of the FA Cup. At the end of the 2022–23 season, Crocombe turned down a new contract and confirmed he would be leaving Grimsby.

=== Burton Albion ===
On 30 June 2023, Crocombe signed for League One club Burton Albion on a two-year deal. Following the conclusion of the 2023–24 season, he was named Men's Player of the Season.

On 13 May 2025, the club said it had offered the player a new contract. However, Crocombe opted to depart the club at the end of his contract. He made 92 appearances during his two-year spell with Burton.

=== Millwall ===
On 24 June 2025, Crocombe signed for Championship club Millwall on a free transfer. He made his Championship debut in an away win at Queens Park Rangers. Millwall finished the season third in the table, and Crocombe registered the highest save percentage and saves-per-90 statistics of all the goalkeepers in the league.

== International career ==
=== Youth ===
On 22 January 2013, Crocombe was called up to the provisional New Zealand under-20s squad for the 2013 OFC U-20 Championship in Fiji, the regional qualifying tournament for the 2013 FIFA U-20 World Cup. He was confirmed in the final squad of 20 on 20 February 2013 and made his debut in the 1–0 win over Vanuatu. Crocombe kept clean sheets in both his appearances and was voted the best goalkeeper of the tournament, earning him the Golden Glove Award.

He was confirmed in the New Zealand under-20 squad for the 2013 FIFA U-20 World Cup in Turkey and was described as a key player for the team. Crocombe played in two of New Zealand's games as the team exited the competition at the group stage.

In June 2015, Crocombe was included in the New Zealand under-23s squad for the Pacific Games, which was used as a qualifying tournament for the 2016 Summer Olympics. Crocombe kept 4 clean sheets in 4 games before New Zealand were disqualified from the tournament for fielding an ineligible player.

=== Senior ===
Before the Cook Islands' 2018 FIFA World Cup qualification campaign, head coach Drew Sherman looked to call Crocombe up after finding him through a scouting agency whilst he was playing for Oxford United, but discovered he had been called up by New Zealand only a few weeks later.

In March 2015, Crocombe was called up to the full New Zealand national team squad for a friendly against South Korea. A year later, he was included in the senior squad for the 2016 OFC Nations Cup. He made his full international debut for the All Whites in a friendly against Canada in March 2018.

On 6 June 2023, after a spell away from the team, Crocombe was called up to the New Zealand squad for friendlies against Sweden and Qatar. Crocombe started the game against Qatar which was abandoned at half time when the New Zealand players refused to play the second half after Michael Boxall was alleged to have been racially abused by one of the Qatari players, New Zealand had been leading 1–0.

Crocombe won the Golden Glove award at the 2024 OFC Men's Nations Cup having conceding no goals in the tournament. He started in goal for the majority of New Zealand's successful qualification campaign for the 2026 FIFA World Cup. He was subsequently included in the 26-man squad for the tournament.

== Career statistics ==
=== Club ===
As of end of 2024–25 season

Appearances and goals by club, season and competition
Club	Season	League			National Cup		League Cup		Other		Total	
Club	Season	Division	Apps	Goals	Apps	Goals	Apps	Goals	Apps	Goals	Apps	Goals
Buckingham Town	2009–10	UCL Division One	33	1	0	0	—		0	0	33	1
Oxford United	2011–12	League Two	0	0	0	0	0	0	0	0	0	0
Oxford United	2012–13	League Two	4	0	0	0	0	0	0	0	4	0
Oxford United	2013–14	League Two	0	0	0	0	0	0	0	0	0	0
Oxford United	2014–15	League Two	0	0	0	0	2	0	0	0	2	0
Oxford United	2015–16	League Two	0	0	0	0	0	0	0	0	0	0
Oxford United	Total		4	0	0	0	2	0	0	0	6	0
Banbury United (loan)	2011–12	SFL Premier Division	1	0	0	0	—		1 (Note: Appearance in the Southern League Cup)	0	2	0
Nuneaton Town (loan)	2014–15	Conference Premier	10	0	0	0	—		0	0	10	0
Barnet (loan)	2015–16	League Two	5	0	0	0	0	0	0	0	5	0
Southport (loan)	2015–16	National League	25	0	1	0	—		3 (Note: Appearances in FA Trophy)	0	29	0
Carlisle United	2016–17	League Two	0	0	0	0	0	0	4 (Note: Appearances in EFL Trophy)	0	4	0
Salford City	2017–18	National League North	31	0	0	0	—		0	0	31	0
Salford City	2018–19	National League	0	0	0	0	—		4	0	4	0
Salford City	Total		31	0	0	0	0	0	4	0	35	0
Brisbane Roar	2019–20	A-League	6	0	0	0	—		3	0	9	0
Melbourne Victory	2020–21	A-League	10	0	0	0	—		0	0	10	0
Grimsby Town	2021–22	National League	29	0	1	0	—		0	0	30	0
Grimsby Town	2022–23	League Two	46	0	7	0	2	0	4	0	59	0
Grimsby Town	Total		75	0	8	0	2	0	4	0	89	0
Burton Albion	2023–24	League One	43	0	2	0	0	0	2	0	47	0
Burton Albion	2024–25	League One	43	0	1	0	1	0	0	0	45	0
Burton Albion	Total		86	0	3	0	1	0	2	0	92	0
Millwall	2025–26	Championship	23	0	0	0	2	0	0	0	25	0
Career total			303	1	12	0	7	0	21	0	341	1

=== International ===
As of match played 26 June 2026

Appearances and goals by national team and year
National team	Year	Apps	Goals
New Zealand	2018	2	0
New Zealand	2019	–	
New Zealand	2020	–	
New Zealand	2021	–	
New Zealand	2022	–	
New Zealand	2023	2	0
New Zealand	2024	9	0
New Zealand	2025	8	0
New Zealand	2026	6	0
Total		27	0

== Honours ==
Salford City

- National League play-offs: 2019
- National League North: 2017–18

Grimsby Town

- National League play-offs: 2022

New Zealand U20

- OFC U-20 Championship: 2013

New Zealand

- OFC Nations Cup: 2016, 2024

Individual

- OFC U-20 Championship Golden Glove: 2013
- Burton Albion Player of the Season: 2023–24
- OFC Men's Nations Cup Golden Glove: 2024
