= Tolaji Bola =

English footballer (born 1999)

Personal information
- Date of birth: 4 January 1999 (age 27)
- Place of birth: Camden, England
- Height: 5 ft 11 in (1.80 m)
- Position: Left back

Youth career
- 2008–2020: Arsenal

Senior career*
Years	Team	Apps	(Gls)
2020–2021	Arsenal	0	(0)
2020–2021	→ Rochdale (loan)	11	(0)
2021–2024	Rotherham United	8	(0)
2023	→ Bradford City (loan)	4	(0)
2024	→ Burton Albion (loan)	10	(0)
Total		33	(0)

International career
2014–2015	England U16	5	(0)
2015–2016	England U17	6	(0)
- England U18
- * Club domestic league appearances and goals as of 3 July 2024 (UTC)

Tolaji Adeyinka Osegie Bola (born 4 January 1999) is an English former professional footballer who played as a left back.

== Club career ==
=== Arsenal ===
Born in London, Bola began his career at Arsenal, joining at under-9 level. He signed his first professional contract with the club in January 2016.

Bola moved on loan to the League One side Rochdale in October 2020. He made his debut in a 3–0 loss against Hull City on 17 October. He returned to Arsenal in January 2021 after making 11 appearances for the club.

=== Rotherham United ===
In August 2021 he signed for Rotherham United. He made his debut for the club in an EFL Trophy game against Doncaster Rovers on 7 September 2021, followed by his league debut against Lincoln City a week later.

In January 2023 he moved on loan to Bradford City. In January 2024, Bola joined League One club Burton Albion on loan for the remainder of the 2023–24 season.

He was released by Rotherham at the end of the 2023–24 season.

== International career ==
Bola is an England youth international, appearing at under-16, under-17 and under-18 levels.

== Career statistics ==
As of 7 April 2024

Club	Season	League			FA Cup		League Cup		Other		Total	
Club	Season	Division	Apps	Goals	Apps	Goals	Apps	Goals	Apps	Goals	Apps	Goals
Arsenal U21	2018–19	—			—		—		3 (Note: Appearance(s) in the EFL Trophy.)	0	3	0
Arsenal U21	2019–20	—			—		—		2	0	2	0
Arsenal U21	2020–21	—			—		—		1	0	1	0
Arsenal U21	Total		0	0	0	0	0	0	6	0	6	0
Arsenal	2020–21	Premier League	0	0	0	0	0	0	0	0	0	0
Rochdale (loan)	2020–21	League One	11	0	1	0	0	0	—		12	0
Rotherham United	2021–22	League One	4	0	2	0	0	0	7	0	13	0
Rotherham United	2022–23	Championship	2	0	0	0	0	0	—		2	0
Rotherham United	2023–24	Championship	2	0	0	0	2	0	—		4	0
Rotherham United	Total		8	0	2	0	2	0	7	0	19	0
Bradford City (loan)	2022–23	League Two	4	0	0	0	0	0	—		4	0
Burton Albion (loan)	2023–24	League One	10	0	0	0	0	0	—		10	0
Career total			33	0	3	0	2	0	13	0	51	0
