= Brad Inman (footballer) =

Scottish-Australian footballer (born 1991)

Personal information
- Full name: Bradden Inman
- Date of birth: 10 December 1991 (age 34)
- Place of birth: Adelaide, Australia
- Height: 6 ft 1 in (1.85 m)
- Position: Attacking midfielder

Team information
- Current team: Gold Coast Knights

Youth career
- Modbury Jets
- 2007–2009: Newcastle United

Senior career*
| Years | Team | Apps | (Gls) |
| 2009–2013 | Newcastle United | 0 | (0) |
| 2012–2013 | → Crewe Alexandra (loan) | 21 | (5) |
| 2013–2016 | Crewe Alexandra | 96 | (15) |
| 2016–2018 | Peterborough United | 11 | (0) |
| 2017–2018 | → Rochdale (loan) | 37 | (4) |
| 2018–2019 | Rochdale | 29 | (4) |
| 2019–2020 | Brisbane Roar | 25 | (4) |
| 2020–2021 | Mohun Bagan | 7 | (0) |
| 2021 | → Odisha (loan) | 6 | (1) |
| 2021 | → Western United (loan) | 5 | (0) |
| 2021–2022 | Mumbai City | 14 | (0) |
| 2023– | Gold Coast Knights | 18 | (6) |

International career
| 2009–2010 | Scotland U19 | 7 | (3) |
| 2010 | Scotland U21 | 2 | (0) |
- * Club domestic league appearances and goals as of 15:38, 25 June 2024 (UTC)

Bradden Inman (born 10 December 1991) is an Australian-Scottish professional footballer who plays as an attacking midfielder for NPL Queensland club Gold Coast Knights. A much-travelled player, he has previously been with Newcastle United, Crewe Alexandra, Peterborough United, Rochdale, Brisbane Roar, Mohun Bagan, and Mumbai City. He formerly represented Scotland at the under-19 and under-21 international levels, but has subsequently been a member of Australian national team squads.

== Early life ==
Brad Inman was born in Adelaide and moved to England in 2006 when he was 14 years old. He has both English and Scottish antecedents. He began playing football when he was six and has said: "I've always just really wanted to play football".

== Club career ==
=== Newcastle United ===
Inman was invited to join the Newcastle United Academy in 2007. Progressing through the club's junior levels, he was promoted to the reserve team in the 2008–09 season. He then signed a three–year contract with the club and soon became a regular choice for the reserves. He was twice named as a substitute for Newcastle's first team: against Manchester City for a Premier League fixture in January 2009 and for a League Cup tie at Peterborough United in September 2009. Ahead of the 2010–11 season, Inman was included in Newcastle's pre–season tour and played against Carlisle United. In February 2012, he signed a one–year contract extension, but for the rest of his Newcastle career, he was a reserve player only.

Inman rejected a proposed loan move to Gateshead in October 2012. Instead, on 22 November, he joined League One club Crewe Alexandra on loan, initially until January 2013. The deal was later extended to the end of the 2012–13 season.

Inman was then offered a new contract by Newcastle but he said he was "considering his options" as a permanent move to Crewe would assure him of first-team football. On 22 August 2013, Inman rejected Newcastle's offer and signed a three-year contract with Crewe for an undisclosed fee.

=== Crewe Alexandra ===
Starting his loan period at Crewe, Inman was an unused substitute in two matches and then made his senior debut on 4 December 2012, playing 88 minutes of a Football League Trophy fixture against Doncaster Rovers. Four days later, on 8 December, he made his league debut and scored his first goal for Crewe in a 3–1 win over Preston North End.

Inman helped Crewe to reach the 2013 Football League Trophy Final, scoring once against Bradford City and twice in the first leg against Coventry City. He was out of action for two weeks because of an ankle injury but was fit to play the first 69 minutes of the final against Southend United, which Crewe won 2–0. Inman made a total of 26 appearances in the season and scored eight goals. He then had to decide if he should complete a permanent transfer to Crewe or return to Newcastle.

Following Inman's permanent transfer to Crewe in August 2013, their team manager Steve Davis said: "He will be a great asset for the club and he deserves great credit for turning down Newcastle's offer and going into the lower leagues to play regular football. I'm sure there are not many 21-year-olds who could turn down a Premier League club for the bigger picture". Inman's first match after signing for the club on a permanent basis was against Leyton Orient on 24 August 2013. He came on as a substitute in the 69th minute, but Crewe lost 2–0. He became a first team regular, playing in a midfield position. However, in November 2013, Davis made Inman and fellow midfielder Anthony Grant available for loan because he was unhappy about their attitude problems: "Their attitude has got to be better," Davis told BBC Radio Stoke. "For the moment, for the benefit of the squad, they're better not around it".

Inman returned to the team on 14 December, coming on as a 78th-minute substitute in a 2–2 draw against Coventry City. He then regained his place in the team. He missed seven matches during the season, but made forty appearances and scored four goals in all competitions.

He played for Crewe until 2015–16, when the club was relegated to League Two. Inman was on the club's retained list after relegation, subject to contract negotiations. Local newspaper Crewe Chronicle expected him to leave and manager Davis later confirmed it.

=== Peterborough United ===
In June 2016, Inman joined Peterborough United on a three–year contract and was allocated the number 16 shirt. Days later, he broke his leg in pre-season training and needed surgery. He was out of action for five months until 17 November when he played for 70 minutes in a reserve team match. On 10 December, he made his first team debut as a late substitute in a 5–2 win over Chesterfield.

Although he had recovered from the injury, Inman was usually on the substitute bench for the rest of the season and, in May 2017, was placed on the transfer list. A month later, he joined Rochdale on loan for the 2017–18 season.

When he returned to Peterborough at the end of the loan, he was again placed on the transfer list and, in July 2018, left the club "by mutual consent". He signed a one-year contract with Rochdale.

=== Rochdale ===
Commencing his loan period at Rochdale in July 2017, Inman was allocated the number 17 shirt and made his club debut in a first round League Cup tie against Mansfield Town, coming on as a late substitute in a 1–0 win. He made forty-seven appearances in all competitions and scored eight goals.

Returning to Rochdale in July 2018, Inman switched his shirt number from 17 to 19. He played in the opening game of the 2018–19 season and scored both goals in a 2–1 win at Burton Albion. Inman went on to make 24 appearances in all competitions, scoring four goals. Rochdale released him at the end of the season.

=== Later career in Australia and India ===
==== Brisbane Roar ====
Inman returned to Australia and, on 27 June 2019, joined A-League club Brisbane Roar who were managed by Robbie Fowler. He made his debut on 7 August 2019 in a 2–0 win over Sydney FC in the FFA Cup round of 32. Inman scored his first goal for Brisbane in the FFA Cup round of 16 tie against Central Coast Mariners, but his team lost a penalty shootout 4–2 after a 2–2 draw.

==== ATK Mohun Bagan ====
On 21 September 2020, Inman joined Indian Super League club ATK Mohun Bagan on a one-year deal. He was loaned to Odisha FC in a swap deal for Marcelinho, who joined Mohun Bagan for the rest of the 2020–21 season. On 12 March 2021, Inman was loaned to A-League club Western United FC for the remainder of the 2020–21 A-League season. He returned to Mohun Bagan in June.

==== Mumbai City ====
On 7 September 2021, Inman was transferred to Mumbai City FC on a one-year deal. He made his Mumbai debut on 1 December in an Indian Super League match against his former club Mohun Bagan, coming on as an 86th-minute substitute for Cássio Gabriel. Mumbai won 5–1.

Inman was included in Mumbai's 2022 AFC Champions League squad. On 11 April, he made his debut in the competition as Mumbai won 2–1 against Al-Quwa Al-Jawiya and became the first Indian team to win an AFC Champions League match.

==== Gold Coast Knights ====
On 22 February 2023, Inman returned to Australia to join NPL Queensland club Gold Coast Knights. He made his debut for them on 14 May in a home match against Olympic FC. Inman scored the opening goal after just five minutes and Knights went on to win 3–0.

== International career ==
Australian by birth, Inman is also eligible to play for both England and Scotland because his father was born in the former country and his mother in the latter. He has represented Scotland at both the under-19 and under-21 levels. Although he has played for Scotland teams, he is still able to play at senior level for Australia under the FIFA rules on senior allegiance.

=== Scotland under-19 ===
Inman was first selected for the Scotland u-19 squad in February 2009. He revealed that he had declined an invitation from the Australia u-20 team to play for Scotland. On 25 February 2009, Inman made his Scotland u-19 debut in a 3–2 loss to France u-19. He played for Scotland u-19 in seven matches and scored three goals, the first against Romania u-19 on 10 October 2009.

=== Scotland under-21 ===
Inman was called up to the Scotland u-21 squad in August 2010. He made his debut as a second-half substitute in a 1–1 draw against Sweden u-21 and his full debut in a 3–1 victory over Northern Ireland u-21.

=== Australia ===
Inman was included in Australia's squad for their full international match against England on 27 May 2016. He was an unused substitute and Australia lost 2–1.

== Career statistics ==
=== Club ===
As of 27 August 2023

Appearances and goals by club, season and competition
| Club | Season | League | | | National Cup | | League Cup | | Other | | Total | |
| Club | Season | Division | Apps | Goals | Apps | Goals | Apps | Goals | Apps | Goals | Apps | Goals |
|---|---|---|---|---|---|---|---|---|---|---|---|---|
| Newcastle United | 2008–09 | Premier League | 0 | 0 | 0 | 0 | 0 | 0 | 0 | 0 | 0 | 0 |
| Newcastle United | 2009–10 | Championship | 0 | 0 | 0 | 0 | 0 | 0 | 0 | 0 | 0 | 0 |
| Newcastle United | 2010–11 | Premier League | 0 | 0 | 0 | 0 | 0 | 0 | 0 | 0 | 0 | 0 |
| Newcastle United | 2011–12 | Premier League | 0 | 0 | 0 | 0 | 0 | 0 | 0 | 0 | 0 | 0 |
| Newcastle United | 2012–13 | Premier League | 0 | 0 | 0 | 0 | 0 | 0 | 0 | 0 | 0 | 0 |
| Crewe Alexandra (loan) | 2012–13 | League One | 21 | 5 | 0 | 0 | 0 | 0 | 5 (Note: Appearance(s) in Football League Trophy) | 3 | 26 | 8 |
| Crewe Alexandra | 2013–14 | League One | 36 | 4 | 2 | 0 | 0 | 0 | 2 | 0 | 40 | 4 |
| Crewe Alexandra | 2014–15 | League One | 21 | 1 | 2 | 0 | 2 | 1 | 1 | 0 | 26 | 2 |
| Crewe Alexandra | 2015–16 | League One | 39 | 10 | 1 | 0 | 1 | 0 | 1 | 0 | 42 | 10 |
| Crewe Alexandra | Crewe Alexandra total | | 117 | 20 | 5 | 0 | 3 | 1 | 9 | 3 | 134 | 24 |
| Peterborough United | 2016–17 | League One | 11 | 0 | 1 | 0 | 0 | 0 | 0 | 0 | 12 | 0 |
| Rochdale (loan) | 2017–18 | League One | 37 | 4 | 3 | 2 | 2 | 0 | 5 | 2 | 47 | 8 |
| Rochdale | 2018–19 | League One | 29 | 4 | 1 | 0 | 1 | 0 | 3 | 0 | 34 | 4 |
| Rochdale | Rochdale total | | 66 | 8 | 4 | 2 | 3 | 0 | 8 | 2 | 81 | 12 |
| Brisbane Roar | 2019–20 | A-League | 25 | 4 | 2 | 1 | — | | 0 | 0 | 27 | 5 |
| Mohun Bagan | 2020–21 | Indian Super League | 7 | 0 | — | | — | | — | | 7 | 0 |
| Odisha FC (loan) | 2020–21 | Indian Super League | 6 | 1 | — | | — | | — | | 6 | 1 |
| Western United | 2020–21 | A-League | 5 | 0 | — | | — | | — | | 5 | 0 |
| Mumbai City | 2021–22 | Indian Super League | 14 | 0 | — | | — | | 5 (Note: Appearance(s) in AFC Champions League) | 0 | 19 | 0 |
| Gold Coast Knights | 2023 | NPL Queensland | 16 | 6 | — | | — | | — | | 16 | 6 |
| Career total | | | 267 | 39 | 12 | 3 | 6 | 1 | 22 | 5 | 307 | 48 |

== Honours ==
Crewe Alexandra

- Football League Trophy: 2012–13

Mohun Bagan

- Indian Super League runner-up: 2020–21

Individual

- Wor Jackie Award: 2010
