= Surf City Cup =

- Founded: 30 August 2019; 6 years ago
- Region: Australia
- Teams: 3
- Current champions: (Australia) Brisbane Roar (1st title)
- Most championships: (Australia) Brisbane Roar (1 title)
- Website: Surf City Cup

The Surf City Cup is a pre-season friendly football tournament, inaugurated in 2019, and played at the Gold Coast Croatia Sports Centre.

Brisbane Roar were the inaugural champions in 2019.

== Format ==
If the match results in a draw in extra time, a penalty shootout will decide the winner.

== Honours ==
Results by team
Club	Winners	Runners-up
Brisbane Roar	1	
Newcastle Jets		1

== Recent matches ==
=== 2019 ===
30 August 2019	Brisbane Roar	1–0	Perth Glory	Gold Coast Croatia Sports Centre
18:30 AEST	Ingham 61'	Report

1 September 2019	Brisbane Roar	3–1	Newcastle Jets	Gold Coast Croatia Sports Centre
16:00 AEST	Muratovic 16'; Inman 39', 81'	Report	Fitzgerald 46'

3 September 2019	Perth Glory	1–1 (3–4 p)	Newcastle Jets	Gold Coast Croatia Sports Centre
18:30 AEST	Kilkenny 44' (pen.)	Report	Kantarovski 11'
	Penalties
	(penalty missed) Juande; (penalty scored) Brimmer; (penalty scored) G. Popovic; (penalty scored) K. Popovic; (penalty missed) Franjic		(penalty scored) Ugarkovic; (penalty scored) Koutroumbis; (penalty missed) D. Petratos; (penalty scored) M. Petratos; (penalty scored) K. Petratos
