= 2018–19 Burton Albion F.C. season =

Burton Albion
2018–19 season
- Chairman: Ben Robinson
- Manager: Nigel Clough
- Stadium: Pirelli Stadium
- League One: 9th
- FA Cup: First round
- League Cup: Semi-final
- Top goalscorer: League: Liam Boyce (6); All: Liam Boyce (8)
- Highest home attendance: 4,903 vs. Luton Town (27 April 2019)
- Lowest home attendance: 202 vs. Middlesbrough U21 (7 November 2018, EFL Trophy group stage
- Average home league attendance: 3,058
- Biggest win: 4–0 vs. Rochdale (5 January 2019)
- Biggest defeat: 0–9 vs. Manchester City (8 January 2019, EFL Cup SF 1st leg)
Home colours	Away colours

The 2018–19 season was Burton Albion's 69th season in their history and their second in League One, following relegation from the Championship, the previous season. Along with competing in the League One, the club also participated in the FA Cup, League Cup and League Trophy. The season ran from 1 July 2018 to 30 June 2019.

== Squad ==
No.	Name	Pos.	Nationality	Place of birth	Age	Apps	Goals	Signed from	Date signed	Fee	End
Goalkeepers
1	Stephen Bywater	GK	(England)	Oldham	45	60	0	Kerala Blasters	16 January 2016	Free	2020
13	Callum Hawkins	GK	(England)		26	0	0	Academy	9 May 2018	Trainee	2020
20	Harry Campbell	GK	(England)	Blackburn	30	4	0	Bolton Wanderers	25 August 2016	Free	2019
40	Bradley Collins	GK	(England)	Southampton	29	35	0	Chelsea	31 August 2018	Loan	2019
Defenders
2	John Brayford	RB	(England)	Stoke-on-Trent	38	194	10	Sheffield United	31 August 2017	Free	2019
3	Jake Buxton	RB	(England)	Sutton-in-Ashfield	41	111	0	Wigan Athletic	1 July 2017	Free	2019
5	Kyle McFadzean	CB	(England)	Sheffield	39	119	5	Milton Keynes Dons	12 July 2016	Free	2019
14	Damien McCrory	LWB	(Republic of Ireland)	Limerick	36	225	10	Dagenham & Redbridge	1 July 2012	Free	2019
19	Reece Hutchinson	LB	(England)		25	31	0	Academy	9 May 2018	Trainee	2021
21	Josh Clarke	RB	(England)	Walthamstow	32	6	0	Brentford	11 January 2019	Loan	2019
22	Kieran Wallace	LB/LM	(England)	Nottingham	31	25	1	Free agent	30 October 2018	Free	2020
26	Colin Daniel	LB/LM	(England)	Eastwood	38	18	0	Peterborough United	21 January 2019	Undisclosed	2020
Midfielders
4	Jamie Allen	CM	(England)	Rochdale	31	77	9	Rochdale	31 August 2017	Undisclosed	2020
7	Scott Fraser	AM	(Scotland)	Dundee	31	50	7	Dundee United	5 July 2018	Free	2020
9	Joe Sbarra	CM	(England)	Lichfield	27	35	0	Academy	1 July 2017	Trainee	2020
11	David Templeton	RW	(Scotland)	Glasgow	37	36	6	Hamilton Academical	5 July 2018	Free	2020
12	Ben Fox	CM	(England)	Burton upon Trent	28	40	2	Academy	1 July 2016	Trainee	2021
15	Alex Bradley	CM	(Finland) (England)	Worcester	27	7	1	West Bromwich Albion	31 January 2019	Loan	2019
16	Marcus Harness	AM	(England)	Coventry	30	83	6	Academy	1 July 2013	Trainee	2020
18	William Miller	AM	(England)	London	30	52	2	Tottenham Hotspur	31 August 2017	Undisclosed	2019
23	Stephen Quinn	CM	(Republic of Ireland)	Dublin	40	48	1	Reading	22 August 2018	Free	2020
Forwards
10	Lucas Akins	CF/LWB	(England)	Huddersfield	37	228	47	Stevenage	1 July 2014	Free	2021
17	Marvin Sordell	CF	(England)	Pinner	35	84	9	Coventry City	1 January 2017	Undisclsoed	2019
24	Chris Beardsley	CF	(England)	Derby	42	1	0	Free agent	21 August 2018	Free	2019
27	Liam Boyce	CF	(Northern Ireland)	Belfast	35	59	17	Ross County	1 July 2017	Undisclosed	2020

=== Statistics ===
As of 6 May 2019

No.	Pos	Nat	Player	Total		League One		FA Cup		League Cup		League Trophy	
No.	Pos	Nat	Player	Apps	Goals	Apps	Goals	Apps	Goals	Apps	Goals	Apps	Goals
1	GK	(England) ENG	Stephen Bywater	10	0	8+0	0	0+0	0	2+0	0	0+0	0
2	DF	(England) ENG	John Brayford	48	3	38+3	3	1+0	0	6+0	0	0+0	0
3	DF	(England) ENG	Jake Buxton	35	0	21+9	0	0+0	0	3+1	0	1+0	0
4	MF	(Northern Ireland) NIR	Jamie Allen	50	8	41+1	7	1+0	0	4+0	1	1+2	0
5	DF	(England) ENG	Kyle McFadzean	42	4	35+0	4	1+0	0	4+0	0	2+0	0
7	MF	(Scotland) SCO	Scott Fraser	51	7	40+3	6	1+0	0	6+0	1	1+0	0
9	MF	(England) ENG	Joe Sbarra	16	0	1+8	0	0+0	0	1+3	0	3+0	0
10	FW	(England) ENG	Lucas Akins	55	14	46+0	13	1+0	0	6+0	1	2+0	0
11	MF	(Scotland) SCO	David Templeton	36	6	17+11	5	0+1	0	5+1	1	1+0	0
12	MF	(England) ENG	Ben Fox	36	1	14+13	1	0+0	0	3+4	0	2+0	0
14	DF	(Republic of Ireland) IRL	Damien McCrory	21	0	10+6	0	1+0	0	2+0	0	2+0	0
15	MF	(Finland) FIN	Alex Bradley	7	1	0+7	1	0+0	0	0+0	0	0+0	0
16	MF	(England) ENG	Marcus Harness	39	6	21+11	5	0+0	0	3+1	0	1+2	1
17	FW	(England) ENG	Marvin Sordell	20	2	10+2	2	0+1	0	1+3	0	2+1	0
18	MF	(England) ENG	William Miller	27	1	10+12	1	0+1	0	1+0	0	3+0	0
19	DF	(England) ENG	Reece Hutchinson	31	0	16+9	0	0+0	0	3+2	0	1+0	0
20	GK	(England) ENG	Harry Campbell	4	0	0+1	0	0+0	0	0+1	0	2+0	0
21	DF	(England) ENG	Josh Clarke	6	0	3+3	0	0+0	0	0+0	0	0+0	0
22	DF	(England) ENG	Kieran Wallace	25	1	8+14	1	0+0	0	2+0	0	1+0	0
23	MF	(Republic of Ireland) IRL	Stephen Quinn	48	1	41+1	1	1+0	0	5+0	0	0+0	0
24	FW	(England) ENG	Chris Beardsley	1	0	0+1	0	0+0	0	0+0	0	0+0	0
26	DF	(England) ENG	Colin Daniel	18	0	17+0	0	0+0	0	0+1	0	0+0	0
27	FW	(Northern Ireland) NIR	Liam Boyce	45	14	33+4	11	1+0	1	5+1	2	0+1	0
40	GK	(England) ENG	Bradley Collins	35	0	31+0	0	1+0	0	3+0	0	0+0	0
Player(s) who left the club during the season:
6	DF	(England) ENG	Ben Turner	27	0	18+1	0	0+0	0	6+0	0	2+0	0
8	MF	(England) ENG	Jake Hesketh	23	3	14+2	1	1+0	0	3+0	2	1+2	0
21	MF	(England) ENG	Elliot Hodge	5	0	0+2	0	0+0	0	0+1	0	1+1	0
26	GK	(Bulgaria) BUL	Dimitar Evtimov	10	0	7+0	0	0+0	0	2+0	0	1+0	0
34	DF	(England) ENG	Jake Flannigan	1	0	0+0	0	0+0	0	0+0	0	1+0	0
44	FW	(England) ENG	Devante Cole	16	2	6+7	2	1+0	0	0+0	0	2+0	0

=== Goals record ===
As of 6 May 2019

Rank	No.	Nat.	Po.	Name	League One	FA Cup	League Cup	League Trophy	Total
1	27	(Northern Ireland)	CF	Liam Boyce	11	1	2	0	14
2	10	(England)	RW	Lucas Akins	13	0	1	0	13
3	4	(Northern Ireland)	CM	Jamie Allen	7	0	1	0	8
4	7	(Scotland)	AM	Scott Fraser	6	0	1	0	7
5	11	(Scotland)	RW	David Templeton	5	0	1	0	6
5	16	(England)	AM	Marcus Harness	5	0	0	1	6
7	5	(England)	CB	Kyle McFadzean	4	0	0	0	4
8	~~8~~	(England)	CM	Jake Hesketh	1	0	2	0	3
9	2	(England)	RB	John Brayford	3	0	0	0	3
9	17	(England)	CF	Marvin Sordell	2	0	0	0	2
9	~~44~~	(England)	CF	Devante Cole	2	0	0	0	2
12	12	(England)	CM	Ben Fox	1	0	0	0	1
12	15	(Finland)	CM	Sonny Bradley	1	0	0	0	1
12	18	(England)	AM	William Miller	1	0	0	0	1
12	22	(England)	LB	Kieran Wallace	1	0	0	0	1
12	23	(Republic of Ireland)	CM	Stephen Quinn	1	0	0	0	1
Total					65	1	8	1	75

=== Disciplinary record ===
As of 6 May 2019

Rank	No.	Nat.	Po.	Name	League One			FA Cup			League Cup			League Trophy			Total		
Rank	No.	Nat.	Po.	Name	Yellow card	(yellow card) (yellow-red card)	Red card	Yellow card	(yellow card) (yellow-red card)	Red card	Yellow card	(yellow card) (yellow-red card)	Red card	Yellow card	(yellow card) (yellow-red card)	Red card	Yellow card	(yellow card) (yellow-red card)	Red card
1	23	(Republic of Ireland)	CM	Stephen Quinn	10	0	0	1	0	0	1	0	0	0	0	0	12	0	0
2	5	(England)	CB	Kyle McFadzean	6	0	0	1	0	0	1	0	1	0	0	0	8	0	1
3	7	(Scotland)	AM	Scott Fraser	6	0	0	0	0	0	1	0	0	0	0	0	7	0	0
4	27	(Northern Ireland)	CF	Liam Boyce	4	0	0	1	0	0	0	0	0	0	0	0	5	0	0
5	2	(England)	RB	John Brayford	3	0	1	0	0	0	0	0	0	0	0	0	3	0	1
5	16	(England)	AM	Marcus Harness	4	0	0	0	0	0	0	0	0	0	0	0	4	0	0
5	19	(England)	RB	Reece Hutchinson	3	0	0	0	0	0	0	0	0	1	0	0	4	0	0
8	~~6~~	(England)	CB	Ben Turner	2	0	0	0	0	0	0	0	0	1	0	0	3	0	0
8	11	(Scotland)	LW	David Templeton	3	0	0	0	0	0	0	0	0	0	0	0	3	0	0
8	12	(England)	CM	Ben Fox	3	0	0	0	0	0	0	0	0	0	0	0	3	0	0
8	14	(Republic of Ireland)	LWB	Damien McCory	2	0	0	0	0	0	0	0	0	1	0	0	3	0	0
8	40	(England)	GK	Bradley Collins	2	0	0	0	0	0	1	0	0	0	0	0	3	0	0
13	3	(England)	LB	Jake Buxton	2	0	0	0	0	0	0	0	0	0	0	0	2	0	0
13	4	(Northern Ireland)	CM	Jamie Allen	0	1	0	0	0	0	0	0	0	0	0	0	0	1	0
13	~~8~~	(England)	CM	Jake Hesketh	1	0	0	0	0	0	1	0	0	0	0	0	2	0	0
13	9	(England)	CM	Joe Sbarra	1	0	0	0	0	0	1	0	0	0	0	0	2	0	0
18	10	(England)	LW	Lucas Akins	1	0	0	0	0	0	0	0	0	0	0	0	1	0	0
18	22	(England)	LB	Kieran Wallace	1	0	0	0	0	0	0	0	0	0	0	0	1	0	0
18	26	(England)	LB	Colin Daniel	1	0	0	0	0	0	0	0	0	0	0	0	1	0	0
Total					54	1	1	3	0	0	6	0	1	3	0	0	66	1	2

== Transfers ==
=== Transfers in ===
Date from	Position	Nationality	Name	From	Fee	Ref.
5 July 2018	AM	(Scotland)	Scott Fraser	(Scotland) Dundee United	Free transfer	
5 July 2018	RW	(Scotland)	David Templeton	(Scotland) Hamilton Academical	Free transfer	
10 August 2018	RM	(England)	Elliot Hodge	Notts County	Free transfer	
22 August 2018	CM	(Republic of Ireland)	Stephen Quinn	Reading	Free transfer	
14 September 2018	GK	(Bulgaria)	Dimitar Evtimov	Nottingham Forest	Free transfer	
8 January 2019	LB	(England)	Kieran Wallace	Matlock Town	Free transfer	
21 January 2019	LB	(England)	Colin Daniel	Peterborough United	Undisclosed	

=== Loans in ===
Start date	Position	Nationality	Name	From	End date	Ref.
30 August 2018	CF	(England)	Devante Cole	Wigan Athletic	15 January 2019	
30 August 2018	DM	(England)	Jake Flannigan	Southampton	2 January 2019	
30 August 2018	AM	(England)	Jake Hesketh	Southampton	2 January 2019	
31 August 2018	GK	(England)	Bradley Collins	Chelsea	31 May 2019	
11 January 2019	RB	(England)	Josh Clarke	Brentford	31 May 2019	
31 January 2019	CM	(Finland)	Alex Bradley	West Bromwich Albion	31 May 2019	

=== Transfers out ===
Date from	Position	Nationality	Name	To	Fee	Ref.
1 July 2018	CB	(England)	Shaun Barker	Retired	—N/a	
1 July 2018	LM	(England)	Lloyd Dyer	Bolton Wanderers	Released	
1 July 2018	CB	(Czech Republic)	Tomáš Egert	Oldham Athletic	Released	
1 July 2018	CB	(Northern Ireland)	Tom Flanagan	Sunderland	Free transfer	
1 July 2018	DM	(England)	Tom Naylor	Portsmouth	Free transfer	
1 July 2018	CF	(England)	Luke Varney	Cheltenham Town	Released	
1 July 2018	LB	(England)	Stephen Warnock	Retired	—N/a	
4 July 2018	CM	(Nigeria)	Hope Akpan	Bradford City	Free transfer	
3 August 2018	CM	(Northern Ireland)	Matty Lund	Scunthorpe United	Undisclosed	
4 January 2019	CF	(England)	Marcus Dinanga	AFC Telford United	Undisclosed	
23 January 2019	GK	(Bulgaria)	Dimitar Evtimov	Accrington Stanley	Free transfer	
31 January 2019	RM	(England)	Elliott Hodge	Leamington F.C.	Free transfer	
31 January 2019	CB	(England)	Ben Turner	Mansfield Town	Mutual consent	
15 March 2019	WG	(England)	Nathan Morley	Matlock Town	Free transfer	

=== Loans out ===
Start date	Position	Nationality	Name	To	End date	Ref.
18 July 2018	CF	(England)	Marcus Dinanga	Hartlepool United	31 December 2018	
10 August 2018	GK	(Scotland)	Jack Livesey	Gresley	14 November 2018	
27 October 2018	GK	(England)	Oliver Fairbrother	Gresley	Work experience	
3 November 2018	CF	(England)	Kyle Clamp	Mickleover Sports	December 2018	
12 December 2018	DF	(England)	Ben Hart	Kidsgrove Athletic	9 January 2019	
21 December 2018	GK	(England)	Callum Hawkins	Mickleover Sports	16 February 2019	
4 January 2019	GK	(Scotland)	Jack Livesey	Kisgrove Athletic	4 February 2019	
31 January 2019	CF	(England)	Marvin Sordell	Northampton Town	31 May 2019	
1 March 2019	GK	(Scotland)	Jack Livesey	Newcastle Town	27 April 2019	
25 March 2019	CM	(England)	Joe Sbarra	Solihull Moors	28 April 2019	

== Competitions ==
=== Pre-season friendlies ===
Burton confirmed friendlies with Mickleover Sports, Kidderminster Harriers, Aston Villa, Solihull Moors, Alfreton Town, Cardiff City and Matlock Town.

13 July 2018 Friendly	Mickleover Sports	2–1	Burton Albion	Mickleover
19:00 BST	Doran 21'; 90+1'		Sbarra 51'	Stadium: Don Amott Arena

17 July 2018 Friendly	Kidderminster Harriers	1–2	Burton Albion	Kidderminster
19:45 BST	Williams 13'	Report	Sbarra 48'; McCormick 88'	Stadium: Aggborough Stadium

21 July 2018 Friendly	Burton Albion	0–4	Aston Villa	Burton upon Trent
15:00 BST		Report	Kodjia 5'; Adomah 51'; De Laet 58'; Gardner 75'	Stadium: Pirelli Stadium; Attendance: 2,890

24 July 2018 Friendly	Solihull Moors	3–2	Burton Albion	Solihull
19:30 BST	Yussuf 16'; Osborne 58'; Wright 76'	Report	Sbarra 55'; Bent 80'	Stadium: Damson Park

25 July 2018 Friendly	Alfreton Town	5–2	Burton Albion	Alfreton
19:45 BST	Peniket 21'; Lane 52'; Denton 69', 75'; Bacon 85'	Report	Beardsley 36'; Boyce 73'	Stadium: Impact Arena

28 July 2018 Friendly	Burton Albion	1–5	Cardiff City	Burton upon Trent
14:00 BST	Boyce 12' (pen.)	Report	Buxton 33' (o.g.); Zohore 40'; Mendez-Laing 44'; Reid 56'; Paterson 72'	Stadium: Pirelli Stadium; Referee: 853

31 July 2018 Friendly	Matlock Town	v	Burton Albion	Matlock
19:30 BST				Stadium: DCJ Group Insurance Arena

=== EFL League One ===
==== League table ====
Pos	Team	Pld	W	D	L	GF	GA	GD	Pts
7	Peterborough United	46	20	12	14	71	62	+9	72
8	Coventry City	46	18	11	17	54	54	0	65
9	Burton Albion	46	17	12	17	66	57	+9	63
10	Blackpool	46	15	17	14	50	52	−2	62
11	Fleetwood Town	46	16	13	17	58	52	+6	61

Source: EFL Official Website
Rules for classification: 1) Points; 2) Goal difference; 3) Number of goals scored; 4) Head-to-head results

==== Results summary ====
Overall								Home						Away					
Pld	W	D	L	GF	GA	GD	Pts	W	D	L	GF	GA	GD	W	D	L	GF	GA	GD
46	17	12	17	66	57	+9	63	11	5	8	35	25	+10	6	7	9	31	32	−1

Last updated: 4 May 2019.

==== Results by matchday ====
Matchday	1	2	3	4	5	6	7	8	9	10	11	12	13	14	15	16	17	18	19	20	21	22	23	24	25	26	27	28	29	30	31	32	33	34	35	36	37	38	39	40	41	42	43	44	45	46
Ground	H	A	H	A	A	H	A	H	H	H	A	H	A	A	H	A	H	A	H	H	A	A	H	H	A	A	H	A	H	H	A	A	A	H	H	A	A	H	H	H	A	A	H	A	H	A
Result	L	L	W	L	L	W	D	W	D	L	L	W	W	D	L	W	W	L	L	W	L	L	W	D	D	W	L	D	D	D	W	D	D	L	D	W	L	W	W	W	D	W	L	L	W	L
Position	16	23	17	20	21	15	16	14	15	16	18	15	14	15	16	14	13	14	16	14	15	16	15	15	13	9	11	13	13	13	12	12	11	11	11	11	11	11	10	10	10	9	9	9	9	9

Updated to match(es) played on 4 May 2019. Source: Statto.com
A = Away; H = Home; W = Win; D = Draw; L = Loss

==== Matches ====
4 August 2018 1	Burton Albion	1–2	Rochdale	Burton upon Trent
15:00 BST	Boyce 71'	Report	Inman 10', 22'	Stadium: Pirelli Stadium; Attendance: 2,987; Referee: Darren Drysdale

11 August 2018 2	Gillingham	3–1	Burton Albion	Gillingham
15:00 BST	Eaves 35', 77'; O'Neill 51', (yellow card) 90+6'; Parker (yellow card) 90+3'	Report	Boyce 26'; McFadzean (yellow card) 79'	Stadium: Priestfield Stadium; Attendance: 5,016; Referee: Lee Probert

18 August 2018 3	Burton Albion	1–0	Doncaster Rovers	Burton upon Trent
15:00 BST	Boyce 47'; Brayford (yellow card) 79'	Report	Butler (yellow card) 67'	Stadium: Pirelli Stadium; Attendance: 3,129; Referee: Peter Bankes

21 August 2018 4	Bradford City	1–0	Burton Albion	Bradford
19:45 BST	Payne 32'; McGowan (yellow card) 75'	Report		Stadium: Valley Parade; Attendance: 15,302; Referee: Chris Sarginson

25 August 2018 5	Oxford United	3–1	Burton Albion	Oxford
15:00 BST	Mousinho 18'; Henry 50'; Holmes 69'	Report	Sordell 39'; Allen (red card) 87'	Stadium: Kassam Stadium; Attendance: 6,026; Referee: Trevor Kettle

1 September 2018 6	Burton Albion	3–0	AFC Wimbledon	Burton upon Trent
15:00 BST	Quinn 34'; Templeton 54'; Boyce 60'	Report	Wordsworth (yellow card) 59'	Stadium: Pirelli Stadium; Attendance: 2,814; Referee: Anthony Backhouse

8 September 2018 7	Accrington Stanley	1–1	Burton Albion	Accrington
15:00 BST	Brown (yellow card) 1'; Sykes (yellow card) 43'; Kee 84'; Finley (yellow card) 89'; Hughes (yellow card) 90+4'	Report	Fraser 11', (yellow card) 78'; Quinn (yellow card) 45+1'	Stadium: Crown Ground; Attendance: 1,943; Referee: Carl Boyeson

15 September 2018 8	Burton Albion	2–1	Sunderland	Burton upon Trent
15:00 BST	Allen 19'; McFadzean 36'	Report	Maguire 54'	Stadium: Pirelli Stadium; Attendance: 4,566; Referee: Dean Whitestone

22 September 2018 P	Barnsley	P–P	Burton Albion	Barnsley
15:00 BST		Report		Stadium: Oakwell
Note: Postponed prior to kick-off due to matchday volunteer suffering a Cardiac arrest.

29 September 2018 9	Burton Albion	0–0	Scunthorpe United	Burton upon Trent
15:00 BST		Report		Stadium: Pirelli Stadium; Attendance: 2,797; Referee: Peter Wright

2 October 2018 10	Burton Albion	1–2	Southend United	Burton upon Trent
19:45 BST	Boyce 21'	Report	Hopper 61'; Cox 78'	Stadium: Pirelli Stadium; Attendance: 2,149; Referee: Seb Stockbridge

6 October 2018 11	Wycombe Wanderers FC	2–1	Burton Albion	High Wycombe
15:00 BST	Jacobson 30' (pen.) (yellow card) 90+4'; Akinfenwa 37'; Bloomfield (yellow card) 81'; Cowan-Hall (yellow card) 87'	Report	Sordell 47'; Quinn (yellow card) 81'	Stadium: Adams Park; Attendance: 4,022; Referee: Charles Breakspear

13 October 2018 12	Burton Albion	1–0	Bristol Rovers	Burton upon Trent
19:45 BST	Fraser (yellow card) 40'; Fox 90+1'	Report	Partington (yellow card) 31'; O. Clarke (yellow card) 74'	Stadium: Pirelli Stadium; Attendance: 3,171; Referee: Martin Coy

20 October 2018 13	Plymouth Argyle	2–3	Burton Albion	Plymouth
15:00 BST	Ladapo 9', 35'; Edwards (yellow card) 67'; Wylde (yellow card) 84'	Report	McFadzean 19', 84'; Akins 39'	Stadium: Home Park; Attendance: 8,190; Referee: Thomas Bramall

23 October 2018 14	Portsmouth	2–2	Burton Albion	Portsmouth
19:45 BST	Hawkins 36'; Clarke 57'	Report	Cole 48'; Hesketh 52'	Stadium: Fratton Park; Attendance: 18,200; Referee: Andrew Madley

27 October 2018 15	Burton Albion	1–2	Peterborough United	Burton upon Trent
15:00 BST	Allen 60'; McFadzean (yellow card) 55'	Report	Ward 29'; Dembélé 58'; Bennett (yellow card) 74'; Chapman (yellow card) 78'	Stadium: Pirelli Stadium; Attendance: 3,600; Referee: Graham Salisbury

3 November 2018 16	Walsall	1–3	Burton Albion	Walsall
15:00 GMT	Cook 77'	Report	Allen 13'; Cole 25'; Fraser 47'	Stadium: Banks's Stadium; Attendance: 5,297; Referee: Kevin Johnson

17 November 2018 17	Burton Albion	1–0	Coventry City	Burton upon Trent
15:00 GMT	McFadzean (yellow card) 5'; Quinn (yellow card) 45'; Willis 66' (o.g.)	Report	Doyle (yellow card) 30'; Ogogo (yellow card) 90+2'; Bakayoko (yellow card) 90+4'	Stadium: Pirelli Stadium; Attendance: 4,681; Referee: Matt Donohue

24 November 2018 18	Blackpool	3–0	Burton Albion	Blackpool
15:00 GMT	Gnanduillet 46'; Thompson 49'; Dodoo 57'	Report		Stadium: Bloomfield Road; Attendance: 3,163; Referee: Thomas Bramall

27 November 2018 19	Burton Albion	1–2	Charlton Athletic	Burton upon Trent
19:45 GMT	Akins 25' (pen.)	Report	Ahearne-Grant 32' (pen.); Pearce 88'	Stadium: Pirelli Stadium; Attendance: 2,438; Referee: Ross Joyce

8 December 2018 20	Burton Albion	2–1	Shrewsbury Town	Burton upon Trent
15:00 GMT	Boyce 3', (yellow card) 90+5'; Akins (yellow card) 67'; Buxton (yellow card) 72'; Fraser 81'; Hutchinson (yellow card) 83'	Report	Grant (yellow card) 52'; Okenabirhie 90+5'	Stadium: Pirelli Stadium; Attendance: 3,062; Referee: Darren Drysdale

15 December 2018 21	Fleetwood Town	1–0	Burton Albion	Fleetwood
15:00 GMT	Evans 51' (pen.), (yellow card) 90+6'; Coyle (yellow card) 58'	Report		Stadium: Highbury Stadium; Attendance: 2,563; Referee: Anthony Backhouse

22 December 2018 22	Luton Town	2–0	Burton Albion	Luton
15:00 GMT	Stacey 17'; Collins 73'	Report	Hesketh (yellow card) 33'; Turner (yellow card) 53'; Quinn (yellow card) 55'; Collins (yellow card) 83'	Stadium: Kenilworth Road; Attendance: 9,538; Referee: Craig Hicks

26 December 2018 23	Burton Albion	3–1	Wycombe Wanderers	Burton-upon-Trent
15:00 GMT	Akins 33', 45+4'; Templeton 34'; Hutchinson (yellow card) 67'	Report	Buxton 27' (o.g.); Thompson (yellow card) 66'; Kashket (yellow card) 69'; Jacobson (yellow card) 73'	Stadium: Pirelli Stadium; Attendance: 3,679; Referee: Michael Salisbury

29 December 2018 24	Burton Albion	1–1	Plymouth Argyle	Burton upon Trent
15:00 GMT	Miller 4'; Wallace (yellow card) 73'; McCrory (yellow card) 77'; Quinn (yellow card) 77'	Report	Smith-Brown (yellow card) 49'; Lameiras 52'; Sarcevic (yellow card) 80'	Stadium: Pirelli Stadium; Attendance: 3,577; Referee: Eddie Ilderton

1 January 2019 25	Bristol Rovers	0–0	Burton Albion	Horfield
15:00 GMT	Sinclair (yellow card) 47'	Report		Stadium: Memorial Stadium; Attendance: 9,060; Referee: Scott Oldham

5 January 2019 26	Rochdale	0–4	Burton Albion	Rochdale
15:00 GMT	Williams (yellow card) 29'; Camps (yellow card) 35'; Rathbone (yellow card) 62'	Report	Harness 19', 30', 86'; Hutchinson (yellow card) 50'; Boyce 78'	Stadium: Spotland Stadium; Attendance: 2,666; Referee: Scott Duncan

12 January 2019 27	Burton Albion	2–3	Gillingham	Burton upon Trent
15:00 GMT	Turner (yellow card) 45+2'; Fraser 52', 60'	Report	List 24'; Reilly 45+3' (pen.); Charles-Cook (yellow card) 76'; Rees 90+1'	Stadium: Pirelli Stadium; Attendance: 2,634; Referee: Peter Wright

19 January 2019 28	Doncaster Rovers	2–2	Burton Albion	Doncaster
15:00 GMT	Smith 53', 75', (yellow card) 76'	Report	Brayford 8', 90'	Stadium: Keepmoat Stadium; Attendance: 7,202; Referee: Paul Marsden

26 January 2019 29	Burton Albion	1–1	Bradford City	Burton-upon-Trent
15:00 GMT	Akins 45+1'; Fraser (yellow card) 48'; Boyce (yellow card) 54'	Report	Doyle (yellow card) 55'; Akpan 68'; Knight-Percival (yellow card) 77'	Stadium: Pirelli Stadium; Attendance: 3,162; Referee: Trevor Kettle

2 February 2019 30	Burton Albion	0–0	Oxford United	Burton upon Trent
15:00 GMT	Brayford (red card) 12'; Templeton (yellow card) 51'; Boyce (yellow card) 76'; McFadzean (yellow card) 90+1'	Report	Mousinho (yellow card) 45+1'	Stadium: Pirelli Stadium; Attendance: 3,197; Referee: Brett Huxtable

9 February 2019 31	Wimbledon	0–2	Burton Albion	London
15:00 GMT		Report	Allen 14'; Templeton 57'	Stadium: Kingsmeadow; Attendance: 4,003; Referee: Andy Haines

16 February 2019 32	Shrewsbury Town	1–1	Burton Albion	Shrewsbury
15:00 GMT	Campbell 8'; Bolton (yellow card) 15'; Williams (yellow card) 77'; Norburn (yellow card) 79'	Report	Templeton 11'; Harness (yellow card) 86'; Brayford (yellow card) 90+1'	Stadium: New Meadow; Attendance: 6,254; Referee: Seb Stockbridge

19 February 2019 33	Barnsley	0–0	Burton Albion	Barnsley
19:45 GMT	Mowatt (yellow card) 51'	Report	Daniel (yellow card) 27'	Stadium: Oakwell; Attendance: 11,778; Referee: Martin Coy

23 February 2019 34	Burton Albion	0–1	Fleetwood Town	Burton upon Trent
15:00 GMT		Report	Madden (yellow card) 45'; Nadesan 57'; Holt (yellow card) 69'; Eastham (yellow card) 90+4'; Husband (yellow card) 90+6'	Stadium: Pirelli Stadium; Attendance: 2,634; Referee: Michael Salisbury

2 March 2019 35	Burton Albion	0–0	Walsall	Burton upon Trent
15:00 GMT	Harness (yellow card) 45'	Report	Gordon (yellow card) 41'	Stadium: Pirelli Stadium; Attendance: 3,924; Referee: Paul Marsden

8 March 2019 36	Coventry City	1–2	Burton Albion	Coventry
19:45 GMT	Enobakhare (yellow card) 36' (yellow-red card) 55'; Bayliss 51'; Sterling (yellow card) 69'; Davies (yellow card) 80'	Report	Akins 19'; Fraser (yellow card) 45+2'; Allen 60'; Harness (yellow card) 83'; Quinn (yellow card) 87'	Stadium: Ricoh Arena; Attendance: 11,468; Referee: Neil Hair

12 March 2019 37	Charlton Athletic	2–1	Burton Albion	Charlton
19:45 GMT	Taylor 6' (pen.); Reeves 33'	Report	Akins 19' (pen.)	Stadium: The Valley; Attendance: 9,505; Referee: Thomas Bramall

16 March 2019 38	Burton Albion	3–0	Blackpool	Burton upon Trent
15:00 GMT	Boyce 6'; Allen 34'; Akins 68'	Report	Long (yellow card) 45+1'; Thompson (yellow card) 63'	Stadium: Pirelli Stadium; Attendance: 2,715; Referee: Anthony Backhouse

23 March 2019 39	Burton Albion	5–2	Accrington Stanley	Burton upon Trent
15:00 GMT	Collins (yellow card) 39'; Fraser 44'; Templeton (yellow card) 65' (goal) 82'; McFadzean 68'; Akins 78' (pen.), 90' (pen.); Quinn (yellow card) 90+5'	Report	McConville 37'; Kee 40' (pen.); Clark (yellow card) 58'	Stadium: Pirelli Stadium; Attendance: 2,916; Referee: Lee Swabey

6 April 2019 40	Burton Albion	3–1	Barnsley	Burton upon Trent
15:00 BST	Allen 5'; Boyce (yellow card) 8' (goal) 81'; Harness 89'	Report	Bähre (yellow card) 74'; Woodrow (yellow card) 83' (goal) 85' (pen.)	Stadium: Pirelli Stadium; Attendance: 4,310; Referee: Michael Salisbury

9 April 2019 41	Sunderland	1–1	Burton Albion	Sunderland
19:45 BST	Baldwin 27'	Report	Morgan 19' (o.g.); Fox (yellow card) 86'	Stadium: Stadium of Light; Attendance: 29,513; Referee: Scott Oldham

13 April 2019 42	Scunthorpe United	0–3	Burton Albion	Scunthorpe
15:00 BST	Perch (yellow card) 14'	Report	Wallace 39'; Quinn (yellow card) 52'; Akins 68'; Boyce 74'	Stadium: Glanford Park; Attendance: 3,698; Referee: Graham Salisbury

19 April 2019 43	Burton Albion	1–2	Portsmouth	Burton upon Trent
15:00 BST	Boyce 47'; McFadzean (yellow card) 88'	Report	Close 31' (yellow card) 44'; Clarke 90+2'; Bogle (yellow card) 90+4'	Stadium: Pirelli Stadium; Attendance: 4,034; Referee: Craig Hicks

22 April 2019 44	Southend United	3–2	Burton Albion	Southend-on-Sea
13:00 BST	Mantom 18'; Bunn 48'; Dieng 77'; Cox (yellow card) 80'	Report	Brayford 60'; Fox (yellow card) 75'; Quinn (yellow card) 77'; Harness 86'	Stadium: Roots Hall; Attendance: 6,169; Referee: Dean Whitestone

27 April 2019 45	Burton Albion	2–1	Luton Town	Burton upon Trent
15:00 BST	Akins 62', 73'	Report	Collins 30'	Stadium: Pirelli Stadium; Attendance: 4,903; Referee: Peter Wright

4 May 2019 46	Peterborough United	3–1	Burton Albion	Peterborough
17:30 BST	Knight (yellow card) 17'; Ward 19'; Toney 35', 88'	Report	Harness (yellow card) 80'; Bradley 85'	Stadium: London Road Stadium; Attendance: 9,019; Referee: Scott Oldham

=== FA Cup ===
The first round draw was made live on BBC by Dennis Wise and Dion Dublin on 22 October.

10 November 2018 First round	Scunthorpe United	2–1	Burton Albion	Scunthorpe
15:00 GMT	Perch 16'; Novak 33'	Report	Boyce 79'	Stadium: Glanford Park; Attendance: 2,260; Referee: Andy Haines

=== EFL Cup ===
On 15 June 2018, the draw for the first round was made in Vietnam. The second round draw was made from the Stadium of Light on 16 August. The third round draw was made on 30 August 2018 by David Seaman and Joleon Lescott. The fourth round draw was made live on Quest by Rachel Yankey and Rachel Riley on 29 September. The draw for the quarter-final was made live on Sky Sports by Jamie Redknapp and Jimmy Floyd Hasselbaink on 31 October. The semi-final draw was made live on Sky Sports by Piers Morgan and Peter Crouch on 19 December 2018.

14 August 2018 First round	Shrewsbury Town	1–2	Burton Albion	Shrewsbury
19:45 BST	Whalley 27'	Report	Templeton 45'; Akins 64' (pen.)	Stadium: New Meadow; Attendance: 2,708; Referee: Graham Salisbury

28 August 2018 Second round	Burton Albion	1–0	Aston Villa	Burton-upon-Trent
19:45 BST	Boyce 52'; McFadzean (red card) 89'	Report		Stadium: Pirelli Stadium; Attendance: 3,411; Referee: Darren Bond

25 September 2018 Third round	Burton Albion	2–1	Burnley	Burton upon Trent
19:45 BST	Boyce 62'; Allen 83'	Report	Long 40'	Stadium: Pirelli Stadium; Attendance: 2,449; Referee: Robert Jones

30 October 2018 Fourth round	Burton Albion	3–2	Nottingham Forest	Burton upon Trent
19:45 BST	Janko 52' (o.g.); Fraser 64'; Hesketh 82'	Report	Grabban 70'; Appiah 90+1'	Stadium: Pirelli Stadium; Attendance: 4,284; Referee: John Brooks

18 December 2018 Quarter-final	Middlesbrough	0–1	Burton Albion	Middlesbrough
19:45 BST	Hugill (yellow card) 16'; Bešić (yellow card) 38'	Report	Hesketh 48' (yellow card) 74'; Collins (yellow card) 79'	Stadium: Riverside Stadium; Attendance: 17,342; Referee: Michael Oliver

8 January 2019 Semi-final first leg	Manchester City	9–0	Burton Albion	Manchester
19:45 GMT	De Bruyne 5'; Jesus 30', 34', 57', 65'; Zinchenko 37'; Foden 62'; Walker 70'; Mahrez 83'	Report		Stadium: City of Manchester Stadium; Attendance: 32,089; Referee: Mike Dean

22 January 2019 Semi-final second leg	Burton Albion	0–1 (0–10 agg.)	Manchester City	Burton upon Trent
19:45 GMT		Report	Agüero 26'	Stadium: Pirelli Stadium; Attendance: 6,519; Referee: Kevin Friend

=== EFL Trophy ===
On 13 July 2018, the initial group stage draw bar the U21 invited clubs was announced.

Pos	Lge	Team	Pld	W	PW	PL	L	GF	GA	GD	Pts	Qualification
1	L2	Port Vale	3	3	0	0	0	5	1	+4	9	Round 2
2	L1	Walsall	3	2	0	0	1	6	4	+2	6	Round 2
3	ACA	Middlesbrough U21	3	1	0	0	2	2	5	−3	3	
4	L1	Burton Albion	3	0	0	0	3	1	4	−3	0	

Source: EFL.com

4 September 2018 Group stages	Burton Albion	1–2	Walsall	Burton upon Trent
19:45 BST	Hutchinson (yellow card) 63'; Turner (yellow card) 88'; Harnes 89'	Report	Morris 9'; Gordon 28'; Parker (yellow card) 61'; Cockerill-Mollett (yellow card) 76'	Stadium: Pirelli Stadium; Attendance: 724; Referee: Robert Lewis

9 October 2018 Group stages	Port Vale	1–0	Burton Albion	Burslem
19:45 BST	Miller 65'	Report		Stadium: Vale Park; Attendance: 601

7 November 2018 Group stages	Burton Albion	0–1	Middlesbrough U21	Burton upon Trent
19:00 GMT		Report	Hackney 87'	Stadium: Pirelli Stadium; Attendance: 202; Referee: Jeremy Simpson
