= 2019–20 Southampton F.C. season =

Southampton
2019–20 season
- Chairman: Gao Jisheng
- Manager: Ralph Hasenhüttl
- Stadium: St Mary's Stadium
- Premier League: 11th
- FA Cup: Fourth round
- EFL Cup: Fourth round
- Top goalscorer: League: Danny Ings (22); All: Danny Ings (25)
- Highest home attendance: 31,712 v Liverpool (17 August 2019)
- Lowest home attendance: 20,091 v Huddersfield Town (4 January 2020)
- Average home league attendance: 29,675 (not including 'Behind closed doors' matches)
Home colours	Away colours	Third colours

The 2019–20 Southampton F.C. season was the club's 21st season in the Premier League and their 43rd in the top division of English football. In addition to the Premier League, the club also competed in the FA Cup and the EFL Cup.

== Pre-season ==
14 July 2019 Friendly	SCR Altach	1–1	Southampton	Altach, Austria
14:00 BST	Fischer 25'	Report	Adams 2'	Stadium: Stadion Schnabelholz; Attendance: 2,596

20 July 2019 Friendly	Preston North End	1–3	Southampton	Preston
15:00 BST	Bodin 18'	Report	Ings 11', 45'; Vokins 83'	Stadium: Deepdale; Attendance: 4,767; Referee: Peter Bankes

23 July 2019 Friendly	Guangzhou R&F	0–4	Southampton XI	Taipa, Macau, China
13:00 BST		Report	Adams 1'; Long 18'; Valery 38'; Klarer 90+1'	Stadium: Estádio Campo Desportivo; Attendance: 10,000

28 July 2019 Friendly	Feyenoord	1–3	Southampton	Rotterdam, Netherlands
13:30 BST	Kökçü 23'	Report	Adams 6'; Yoshida 34'; Boufal 90'	Stadium: De Kuip; Referee: Serdar Gözübüyük

3 August 2019 Friendly	Southampton	2–0	Köln	Southampton
15:00 BST	Ings 5' (pen.); Højbjerg 53'	Report		Stadium: St Mary's Stadium; Attendance: 14,871; Referee: Jonathan Moss

== Competitions ==
=== Premier League ===
2018–19 3rd kit was used vs Newcastle United (8 December)
2020–21 home kit was used vs Sheffield United (22 July)

==== League table ====
Pos	Team	Pld	W	D	L	GF	GA	GD	Pts
9	Sheffield United	38	14	12	12	39	39	0	54
10	Burnley	38	15	9	14	43	50	−7	54
11	Southampton	38	15	7	16	51	60	−9	52
12	Everton	38	13	10	15	44	56	−12	49
13	Newcastle United	38	11	11	16	38	58	−20	44

Source: Premier League
Rules for classification: 1) Points; 2) Goal difference; 3) Goals scored; 4) If the champions, relegated teams or qualified teams for UEFA competitions cannot be determined by rules 1 to 3, rules 4.1 to 4.3 are applied – 4.1) Points gained in head to head record between such teams; 4.2) Away goals scored in head to head record between such teams; 4.3) Play-offs

==== Results summary ====
Overall								Home						Away					
Pld	W	D	L	GF	GA	GD	Pts	W	D	L	GF	GA	GD	W	D	L	GF	GA	GD
38	15	7	16	51	60	−9	52	6	3	10	21	35	−14	9	4	6	30	25	+5

Last updated: 26 July 2020.
Source: BBC

==== Results by matchday ====
Matchday	1	2	3	4	5	6	7	8	9	10	11	12	13	14	15	16	17	18	19	20	21	22	23	24	25	26	27	28	29	30	31	32	33	34	35	36	37	38
Ground	A	H	A	H	A	H	A	H	A	H	A	H	A	H	H	A	H	A	A	H	H	A	H	A	A	H	H	A	H	A	H	A	H	A	A	H	A	H
Result	L	L	W	D	W	L	L	L	D	L	L	L	D	W	W	L	L	W	W	D	W	W	L	W	L	L	W	L	L	W	L	W	W	D	D	D	W	W
Position	17	19	18	13	10	13	14	17	17	18	18	19	19	18	17	18	18	17	14	15	12	12	13	9	13	12	12	13	14	14	14	14	13	12	12	12	12	11

Updated to match(es) played on 26 July 2020. Source: BBC Sport
A = Away; H = Home; W = Win; D = Draw; L = Loss

==== Match results ====
On 13 June 2019, the Premier League fixtures were announced.

10 August 2019 1	Burnley	3–0	Southampton	Burnley
15:00 BST	Barnes 63', 70'; Guðmundsson 75'	Report		Stadium: Turf Moor; Attendance: 19,784; Referee: Graham Scott

17 August 2019 2	Southampton	1–2	Liverpool	Southampton
15:00 BST	Ings 83'	Report	Mané 45+1'; Firmino 71'	Stadium: St. Mary's Stadium; Attendance: 31,712; Referee: Andre Marriner

24 August 2019 3	Brighton & Hove Albion	0–2	Southampton	Falmer
15:00 BST		Report	Djenepo 55'; Redmond 90+1'	Stadium: Falmer Stadium; Attendance: 30,019; Referee: Kevin Friend

31 August 2019 4	Southampton	1–1	Manchester United	Southampton
12:30 BST	Vestergaard 58'	Report	James 10'	Stadium: St Mary’s Stadium; Attendance: 30,499; Referee: Mike Dean
Note: Live on BT Sport

14 September 2019 5	Sheffield United	0–1	Southampton	Sheffield
15:00 BST		Report	Djenepo 66'	Stadium: Bramall Lane; Attendance: 30,985; Referee: Lee Mason

20 September 2019 6	Southampton	1–3	Bournemouth	Southampton
20:00 BST	Ward-Prowse 53' (pen.)	Report	Aké 10'; H. Wilson 35'; C. Wilson 90+5'	Stadium: St Mary’s Stadium; Attendance: 30,168; Referee: Chris Kavanagh
Note: Live on Sky Sports

28 September 2019 7	Tottenham Hotspur	2–1	Southampton	Tottenham
15:00 BST	Ndombele 24'; Kane 43'	Report	Ings 39'	Stadium: Tottenham Hotspur Stadium; Attendance: 59,645; Referee: Graham Scott

6 October 2019 8	Southampton	1–4	Chelsea	Southampton
14:00 BST	Ings 30'	Report	Abraham 17'; Mount 24'; Kante 40'; Batshuayi 89'	Stadium: St Mary's Stadium; Attendance: 31,473; Referee: Paul Tierney
Note: Live on Sky Sports

19 October 2019 9	Wolverhampton Wanderers	1–1	Southampton	Wolverhampton
15:00 BST	Jiménez 61' (pen.)	Report	Ings 53'	Stadium: Molineux Stadium; Attendance: 30,915; Referee: Peter Bankes

25 October 2019 10	Southampton	0–9	Leicester City	Southampton
20:00 BST		Report	Chilwell 10'; Tielemans 17'; Pérez 19', 39', 57'; Vardy 45', 58', 90+3' (pen.); Maddison 85'	Stadium: St Mary's Stadium; Attendance: 28,762; Referee: Andre Marriner
Note: Live on Sky Sports

2 November 2019 11	Manchester City	2–1	Southampton	Manchester
15:00 GMT	Agüero 70'; Walker 86'	Report	Ward-Prowse 13'	Stadium: City of Manchester Stadium; Attendance: 53,922; Referee: Lee Mason

9 November 2019 12	Southampton	1–2	Everton	Southampton
15:00 GMT	Ings 50'	Report	Davies 4'; Richarlison 75'	Stadium: St Mary's Stadium; Attendance: 29,754; Referee: Paul Tierney

23 November 2019 13	Arsenal	2–2	Southampton	Holloway
15:00 GMT	Lacazette 18', 90+6'	Report	Ings 8'; Ward-Prowse 71'	Stadium: Emirates Stadium; Attendance: 60,295; Referee: Stuart Attwell

30 November 2019 14	Southampton	2–1	Watford	Southampton
17:30 GMT	Ings 78'; Ward-Prowse 83'	Report	Sarr 24'	Stadium: St Mary's Stadium; Attendance: 26,929; Referee: Michael Oliver
Note: Live on Sky Sports

4 December 2019 15	Southampton	2–1	Norwich City	Southampton
19:30 GMT	Ings 22'; Bertrand 43'	Report	Pukki 66'	Stadium: St Mary's Stadium; Attendance: 27,019; Referee: Kevin Friend
Note: Live on Amazon Prime

8 December 2019 16	Newcastle United	2–1	Southampton	Newcastle
14:00 GMT	Shelvey 68'; Fernández 87'	Report	Ings 52'	Stadium: St James' Park; Attendance: 42,303; Referee: David Coote

14 December 2019 17	Southampton	0–1	West Ham United	Southampton
17:30 GMT		Report	Haller 37'	Stadium: St Mary's Stadium; Attendance: 27,701; Referee: Martin Atkinson
Note: Live on Sky Sports

21 December 2019 18	Aston Villa	1–3	Southampton	Aston, Birmingham
15:00 GMT	Grealish 75'	Report	Ings 21', 51'; Stephens 31'	Stadium: Villa Park; Attendance: 41,834; Referee: Craig Pawson

26 December 2019 19	Chelsea	0–2	Southampton	London
15:00 GMT		Report	Obafemi 31'; Redmond 73'	Stadium: Stamford Bridge; Attendance: 40,651; Referee: Jonathan Moss
Note: Live on Amazon Prime

28 December 2019 20	Southampton	1–1	Crystal Palace	Southampton
15:00 GMT	Ings 74'	Report	Tomkins 50'	Stadium: St Mary's Stadium; Attendance: 31,108; Referee: Andrew Madley

1 January 2020 21	Southampton	1–0	Tottenham Hotspur	Southampton
15:00 GMT	Ings 17'	Report		Stadium: St Mary's Stadium; Attendance: 30,976; Referee: Mike Dean
Note: Live on BT Sport

11 January 2020 22	Leicester City	1–2	Southampton	Leicester
15:00 GMT	Praet 14'	Report	Armstrong 19'; Ings 81'	Stadium: King Power Stadium; Attendance: 32,115; Referee: Lee Mason

18 January 2020 23	Southampton	2–3	Wolverhampton Wanderers	Southampton
15:00 GMT	Bednarek 15'; Long 35'	Report	Neto 53'; Jiménez 65' (pen.), 76'	Stadium: St Mary's Stadium; Attendance: 31,152; Referee: Darren England

21 January 2020 24	Crystal Palace	0–2	Southampton	Croydon
19:30 GMT		Report	Redmond 22'; Armstrong 48'	Stadium: Selhurst Park; Attendance: 23,739; Referee: Andre Marriner

1 February 2020 25	Liverpool	4–0	Southampton	Liverpool
15:00 GMT	Oxlade-Chamberlain 47'; Henderson 60'; Salah 72', 90'	Report		Stadium: Anfield; Attendance: 53,291; Referee: Kevin Friend

15 February 2020 26	Southampton	1–2	Burnley	Southampton
12:30 GMT	Ings 18'	Report	Westwood 2'; Vydra 60'	Stadium: St Mary's Stadium; Attendance: 26,302; Referee: Simon Hooper
Note: Live on BT Sport

22 February 2020 27	Southampton	2–0	Aston Villa	Southampton
15:00 GMT	Long 8'; Armstrong 90+5'	Report		Stadium: St Mary's Stadium; Attendance: 31,478; Referee: Craig Pawson

29 February 2020 28	West Ham United	3–1	Southampton	Stratford
15:00 GMT	Bowen 15'; Haller 40'; Antonio 54'	Report	Obafemi 31'	Stadium: London Stadium; Attendance: 59,962; Referee: Anthony Taylor

7 March 2020 29	Southampton	0–1	Newcastle United	Southampton
15:00 GMT		Report	Saint-Maximin 79'	Stadium: St Mary's Stadium; Attendance: 30,096; Referee: Graham Scott

19 June 2020 30	Norwich City	0–3	Southampton	Norwich
18:00 BST		Report	Ings 49'; Armstrong 54'; Redmond 79'	Stadium: Carrow Road; Attendance: Behind closed doors Referee: Kevin Friend
Note: The match was postponed on 13 March due to concerns over the coronavirus pandemic. It was rescheduled to 19 June. Live on Sky Sports

25 June 2020 31	Southampton	0–2	Arsenal	Southampton
18:00 BST		Report	Nketiah 20'; Willock 87'	Stadium: St Mary's Stadium; Attendance: Behind closed doors Referee: Graham Scott
Note: The match was postponed on 13 March due to concerns over the coronavirus pandemic, and rescheduled to 25 June. Live on Sky Sports

28 June 2020 32	Watford	1–3	Southampton	Watford
16:30 BST	Bednarek 79' (o.g.)	Report	Ings 16', 70'; Ward-Prowse 82'	Stadium: Vicarage Road; Attendance: Behind closed doors Referee: Michael Oliver
Note: The match was postponed on 13 March due to concerns over the coronavirus pandemic, and rescheduled to 28 June. Live on Sky Sports

5 July 2020 33	Southampton	1–0	Manchester City	Southampton
19:00 BST	Adams 16'	Report		Stadium: St Mary's Stadium; Attendance: Behind closed doors Referee: Andre Marriner
Note: The match was postponed on 3 April due to concerns over the coronavirus pandemic, and rescheduled to 5 July. Live on BBC One

9 July 2020 34	Everton	1–1	Southampton	Liverpool
18:00 BST	Richarlison 43'	Report	Ings 31'	Stadium: Goodison Park; Attendance: Behind closed doors Referee: Lee Mason
Note: The match was postponed on 3 April due to concerns over the coronavirus pandemic, and rescheduled to 9 July. Live on Amazon Prime

13 July 2020 35	Manchester United	2–2	Southampton	Greater Manchester
20:00 BST	Rashford 20'; Martial 23'	Report	Armstrong 12'; Obafemi 90+6'	Stadium: Old Trafford; Attendance: Behind closed doors Referee: Chris Kavanagh
Note: The match was postponed on 3 April due to concerns over the coronavirus pandemic, and rescheduled to 13 July. Live on Sky Sports

16 July 2020 36	Southampton	1–1	Brighton & Hove Albion	Southampton
20:15 BST	Ings 66'	Report	Maupay 17'	Stadium: St Mary's Stadium; Attendance: Behind closed doors Referee: Andre Marriner
Note: The match was postponed on 3 April due to concerns over the coronavirus pandemic, and rescheduled to 16 July. Live on BT Sport

19 July 2020 37	Bournemouth	0–2	Southampton	Bournemouth
14:00 BST		Report	Ings 41'; Adams 90+8'	Stadium: Dean Court; Attendance: Behind closed doors Referee: Craig Pawson
Note: The match was postponed on 3 April due to concerns over the coronavirus pandemic, and rescheduled to 19 July. Live on BT Sport

26 July 2020 38	Southampton	3–1	Sheffield United	Southampton
16:00 BST	Adams 50', 71'; Ings 84' (pen.)	Report	Lundstram 26'	Stadium: St Mary's Stadium; Attendance: Behind closed doors Referee: Peter Bankes
Note: The match was postponed on 3 April due to concerns over the coronavirus pandemic, and rescheduled to 26 July. Live on Sky Sports

=== FA Cup ===
The third round draw was made live on BBC Two from Etihad Stadium, Micah Richards and Tony Adams conducted the draw. On 6 January, Alex Scott and David O'Leary conducted the fourth round draw live on BBC One from the Emirates Stadium.

4 January 2020 Third round	Southampton	2–0	Huddersfield Town	Southampton
15:01 GMT	Smallbone 47'; Vokins 87'	Report		Stadium: St Mary's Stadium; Attendance: 20,091; Referee: Tim Robinson

25 January 2020 Fourth round	Southampton	1–1	Tottenham Hotspur	Southampton
15:00 GMT	Boufal 87'	Report	Son 58'	Stadium: St Mary's Stadium; Attendance: 29,282; Referee: Peter Bankes

5 February 2020 Fourth round replay	Tottenham Hotspur	3–2	Southampton	Tottenham
19:45 GMT	Stephens 12' (o.g.); Moura 78'; Son 87' (pen.)	Report	Long 34'; Ings 72'	Stadium: Tottenham Hotspur Stadium; Attendance: 56,046; Referee: David Coote
Note: Live on BT Sport

=== EFL Cup ===
The second round draw was made on 13 August 2019 following the conclusion of all but one first-round matches. The third round draw was confirmed on 28 August 2019, live on Sky Sports. The draw for the fourth round was made on 25 September 2019.

27 August 2019 Second round	Fulham	0–1	Southampton	Fulham
19:45 BST		Report	Obafemi 57'	Stadium: Craven Cottage; Attendance: 8,467; Referee: Robert Jones

24 September 2019 Third round	Portsmouth	0–4	Southampton	Portsmouth
19:45 BST		Report	Ings 21', 44'; Cédric 77'; Redmond 86'	Stadium: Fratton Park; Attendance: 18,707; Referee: Kevin Friend
Note: Live on Sky Sports

29 October 2019 Fourth round	Manchester City	3–1	Southampton	Manchester
19:45 GMT	Otamendi 20'; Agüero 38', 56'	Report	Stephens 75'	Stadium: Etihad Stadium; Attendance: 37,143; Referee: Jonathan Moss

== Squad statistics ==
As of 26 July 2020

No.	Pos.	Nat.	Name	League				FA Cup				EFL Cup				Total			
No.	Pos.	Nat.	Name	Apps.	Goals	Yellow card	Red card	Apps.	Goals	Yellow card	Red card	Apps.	Goals	Yellow card	Red card	Apps.	Goals	Yellow card	Red card
1	GK	(England)	Alex McCarthy	28	0	0	0	0	0	0	0	3	0	0	0	31	0	0	0
4	DF	(Denmark)	Jannik Vestergaard	17(2)	1	3	0	1(1)	0	0	0	0	0	0	0	18(3)	1	3	0
5	DF	(England)	Jack Stephens	27(1)	1	4	1	2	0	0	0	1	1	0	0	30(1)	2	4	1
7	FW	(Republic of Ireland)	Shane Long	15(11)	2	0	0	2	1	1	0	1(2)	0	0	0	18(13)	3	1	0
9	FW	(England)	Danny Ings	32(6)	22	3	0	2	1	0	0	1(1)	2	0	0	35(7)	25	3	0
10	FW	(England)	Ché Adams	12(18)	4	0	0	1(2)	0	1	0	1(1)	0	0	0	14(21)	4	1	0
12	MF	(Mali)	Moussa Djenepo	10(8)	2	4	1	0(1)	0	0	0	1	0	0	0	11(9)	2	4	1
14	MF	(Spain)	Oriol Romeu	20(10)	0	5	0	2	0	1	0	3	0	1	0	25(10)	0	7	0
16	MF	(England)	James Ward-Prowse	38	5	9	0	3	0	0	0	3	0	1	0	44	5	10	0
17	MF	(Scotland)	Stuart Armstrong	19(11)	5	4	0	1(2)	0	0	0	1	0	0	0	21(13)	5	4	0
19	MF	(Morocco)	Sofiane Boufal	8(12)	0	2	0	2(1)	1	0	0	2	0	0	0	12(13)	1	2	0
20	FW	(Republic of Ireland)	Michael Obafemi	8(13)	3	1	0	1(1)	0	0	0	2	1	0	0	11(14)	4	1	0
21	DF	(England)	Ryan Bertrand	31(1)	1	3	1	2	0	1	0	1	0	1	0	34(1)	1	5	1
22	FW	(England)	Nathan Redmond	32	4	2	0	2	0	0	0	1(2)	1	0	0	35(2)	5	2	0
23	MF	(Denmark)	Pierre-Emile Højbjerg	30(3)	0	5	0	2	0	0	0	3	0	0	0	35(3)	0	5	0
24	DF	(England)	Kyle Walker-Peters	7(3)	0	1	0	0	0	0	0	0	0	0	0	7(3)	0	1	0
27	MF	(Republic of Ireland)	Will Smallbone	4(5)	0	0	0	1	1	0	0	0	0	0	0	5(5)	1	0	0
28	GK	(England)	Angus Gunn	10	0	0	0	3	0	1	0	0	0	0	0	13	0	1	0
29	DF	(England)	Jake Vokins	1	0	0	0	1	1	0	0	0(1)	0	0	0	2(1)	1	0	0
35	DF	(Poland)	Jan Bednarek	34	1	4	0	2	0	2	0	3	0	0	0	39	1	6	0
36	MF	(England)	Jacob Maddox	0	0	0	0	0	0	0	0	0	0	0	0	0	0	0	0
38	DF	(Austria)	Kevin Danso	3(3)	0	0	1	2	0	0	0	2	0	1	0	7(3)	0	1	1
40	FW	(England)	Dan N'Lundulu	0	0	0	0	0	0	0	0	0	0	0	0	0	0	0	0
41	GK	(England)	Harry Lewis	0	0	0	0	0	0	0	0	0	0	0	0	0	0	0	0
43	DF	(France)	Yan Valery	10(1)	0	1	0	0	0	0	0	1	0	0	0	11(1)	0	1	0
45	DF	(England)	Sam McQueen	0	0	0	0	0	0	0	0	0	0	0	0	0	0	0	0
47	MF	(Republic of Ireland)	Will Ferry	0	0	0	0	0	0	0	0	0	0	0	0	0	0	0	0
52	MF	(England)	Nathan Tella	0(1)	0	0	0	0	0	0	0	0	0	0	0	0(1)	0	0	0
64	MF	(Switzerland)	Alex Jankewitz	0	0	0	0	0	0	0	0	0	0	0	0	0	0	0	0
Players with appearances who left during the season
2	DF	(Portugal)	Cédric Soares	16	0	1	0	0(1)	0	0	0	2	1	0	0	18(1)	1	1	0
3	DF	(Japan)	Maya Yoshida	6(2)	0	1	0	1	0	0	0	1(1)	0	0	0	8(3)	0	1	0

=== Most appearances ===
As of 26 July 2020

#	Pos.	Nat.	Name	League		FA Cup		EFL Cup		Total		
#	Pos.	Nat.	Name	Starts	Subs	Starts	Subs	Starts	Subs	Starts	Subs	Total
1	MF	(England)	James Ward-Prowse	38	0	3	0	3	0	44	0	44
2	FW	(England)	Danny Ings	32	6	2	0	1	1	35	7	42
3	DF	(Poland)	Jan Bednarek	34	0	2	0	3	0	39	0	39
4	MF	(Denmark)	Pierre-Emile Højbjerg	30	3	2	0	3	0	35	3	38
5	MF	(England)	Nathan Redmond	32	0	2	0	1	2	35	2	37
6	DF	(England)	Ryan Bertrand	31	1	2	0	1	0	34	1	35
6	MF	(Spain)	Oriol Romeu	20	10	2	0	3	0	25	10	35
6	FW	(England)	Ché Adams	12	18	1	2	1	1	14	21	35
9	MF	(Scotland)	Stuart Armstrong	19	11	1	2	1	0	21	13	34
10	GK	(England)	Alex McCarthy	28	0	0	0	3	0	31	0	31
10	DF	(England)	Jack Stephens	27	1	2	0	1	0	30	1	31
10	FW	(Republic of Ireland)	Shane Long	15	11	2	0	1	2	18	13	31

=== Top goalscorers ===
As of 26 July 2020

#	Pos.	Nat.	Name	League		FA Cup		EFL Cup		Total		
#	Pos.	Nat.	Name	Goals	Apps.	Goals	Apps.	Goals	Apps.	Goals	Apps.	GPG
1	FW	(England)	Danny Ings	22	38	1	2	2	2	25	42	0.60
2	MF	(Scotland)	Stuart Armstrong	5	30	0	3	0	1	5	34	0.15
2	FW	(England)	Nathan Redmond	4	32	0	2	1	3	5	37	0.14
2	MF	(England)	James Ward-Prowse	5	38	0	3	0	3	5	44	0.11
5	FW	(Republic of Ireland)	Michael Obafemi	3	21	0	2	1	2	4	25	0.16
5	FW	(England)	Ché Adams	4	30	0	3	0	2	4	35	0.11
7	FW	(Republic of Ireland)	Shane Long	2	26	1	2	0	3	3	31	0.10
8	MF	(Mali)	Moussa Djenepo	2	18	0	1	0	1	2	20	0.10
8	DF	(England)	Jack Stephens	1	28	0	2	1	1	2	31	0.06
10	DF	(England)	Jake Vokins	0	1	1	1	0	1	1	3	0.33
10	MF	(Republic of Ireland)	Will Smallbone	0	9	1	1	0	0	1	10	0.10
10	DF	(Portugal)	Cédric Soares	0	16	0	1	1	2	1	19	0.05
10	DF	(Denmark)	Jannik Vestergaard	1	19	0	2	0	0	1	21	0.05
10	MF	(Morocco)	Sofiane Boufal	0	20	1	3	0	2	1	25	0.04
10	DF	(England)	Ryan Bertrand	1	32	0	2	0	1	1	35	0.03
10	DF	(Poland)	Jan Bednarek	1	34	0	2	0	3	1	39	0.03

== Transfers ==
Players transferred in

Date	Pos.	Name	Club	Fee	Ref.
1 July 2019	FW	(England) Ché Adams	(England) Birmingham City	Undisclosed	
1 July 2019	MF	(Mali) Moussa Djenepo	(Belgium) Standard Liège	Undisclosed	
1 July 2019	FW	(England) Danny Ings	(England) Liverpool	£20 million	
2 August 2019	GK	(Northern Ireland) Tommy Scott	(England) Yeovil Town	Free transfer	

Players loaned in

Date	Pos.	Name	Club	Duration	Ref.
8 August 2019 (Note: Move officially confirmed on 9 August 2019.)	DF	(Austria) Kevin Danso	(Germany) Augsburg	End of season	
29 January 2020	DF	(England) Kyle Walker-Peters	(England) Tottenham Hotspur	End of season	
31 January 2020 (Note: Move officially confirmed on 2 February 2020.)	MF	(England) Jacob Maddox	(England) Chelsea	End of season	

Players transferred out

Date	Pos.	Name	Club	Fee	Ref.
1 July 2019	DF	(England) Matt Targett	(England) Aston Villa	Undisclosed	
13 July 2019	FW	(England) Sam Gallagher	(England) Blackburn Rovers	Undisclosed	
22 July 2019	MF	(Netherlands) Jordy Clasie	(Netherlands) AZ Alkmaar	Undisclosed	
8 August 2019	FW	(England) Charlie Austin	(England) West Bromwich Albion	Undisclosed	
31 January 2020	MF	(England) Harry Hamblin	(England) Macclesfield Town	Free transfer	
26 May 2020	MF	(Norway) Kornelius Hansen	(Norway) Stabæk	Compensation	

Players loaned out

Date	Pos.	Name	Club	Duration	Ref.
2 July 2019	DF	(England) Alfie Jones	(England) Gillingham	End of season	
8 July 2019	GK	(England) Jack Rose	(England) Walsall	End of season	
9 July 2019	GK	(England) Kingsley Latham	(England) Havant & Waterlooville	1 January 2020	
10 July 2019	GK	(England) Alex Cull	(England) AFC Totton	1 January 2020	
17 July 2019	MF	(England) Harry Hamblin	(England) Bath City	1 January 2020	
2 August 2019	MF	(England) Tyreke Johnson	(England) Woking	1 January 2020	
7 August 2019	MF	(England) Josh Sims	(United States) New York Red Bulls	End of season	
8 August 2019	MF	(England) Harrison Reed	(England) Fulham	End of season	
22 August 2019	GK	(England) Fraser Forster	(Scotland) Celtic	End of season	
29 August 2019	MF	(Republic of Ireland) Thomas O'Connor	(England) Gillingham	End of season	
30 August 2019	MF	(Norway) Mohamed Elyounoussi	(Scotland) Celtic	30 June 2020	
1 September 2019	FW	(Argentina) Guido Carrillo	(Spain) Leganés	End of season	
2 September 2019	MF	(England) Jake Hesketh	(England) Lincoln City	End of season	
2 September 2019	DF	(Netherlands) Wesley Hoedt	(Belgium) Royal Antwerp	End of season	
2 September 2019	MF	(Gabon) Mario Lemina	(Turkey) Galatasaray	End of season	
3 September 2019	FW	(England) Marcus Barnes	(England) Eastleigh	6 January 2020	
7 January 2020	DF	(Austria) Christoph Klarer	(Austria) SKN St. Pölten	End of season	
19 January 2020	DF	(Slovakia) Šimon Kozák	(Slovakia) MFK Zemplín Michalovce	30 June 2020	
30 January 2020	GK	(England) Kingsley Latham	(England) Gosport Borough	End of season	
31 January 2020	DF	(Portugal) Cédric Soares	(England) Arsenal	30 June 2020	
31 January 2020	DF	(England) Kayne Ramsay	(England) Shrewsbury Town	End of season	
31 January 2020	MF	(England) Callum Slattery	(Netherlands) De Graafschap	End of season	
31 January 2020	DF	(Japan) Maya Yoshida	(Italy) Sampdoria	30 June 2020	
24 February 2020	MF	(England) Tyreke Johnson	(United States) Hartford Athletic	30 November 2020	
30 June 2020	MF	(Norway) Mohamed Elyounoussi	(Scotland) Celtic	30 June 2021	

Players released

Date	Pos.	Name	Subsequent club	Join date	Ref.
30 June 2019	MF	(Northern Ireland) Steven Davis	(Scotland) Rangers	1 July 2019	
30 June 2019	FW	(Republic of Ireland) Jonathan Afolabi	(Scotland) Celtic	17 August 2019	
30 June 2019	MF	(England) Jake Flannigan	(England) Hampton & Richmond Borough	23 August 2019	
30 June 2019	MF	(England) Ben Rowthorn	(England) Dorchester Town	1 October 2019	
30 June 2019	DF	(England) Jamie Bradley-Green	Currently unattached		
30 June 2019	MF	(South Africa) Siph Mdlalose	Currently unattached		
31 December 2019	DF	(Scotland) Kieran Freeman	(Scotland) Dundee United	10 January 2020	
