= Harry Campbell =

Harry Campbell may refer to:

- Harry Campbell (footballer, born 1867) (1867–1915), Scottish footballer
- Harry Campbell (footballer, born 1995), football goalkeeper
- Harry Campbell (boxer) (1938–1961), American lightweight boxer
- Harry Campbell (physician) (1860–1938), British physician
- "Harry Campbell and the Heavies", a song by Billy Connolly from the album Transatlantic Years

== See also ==
- Henry Campbell (disambiguation)
- Harold Campbell (disambiguation)
