= Henry Campbell =

Henry Campbell may refer to:

- Henry Dundas Campbell (c. 1798–1872), British army officer and Governor of Sierra Leone
- Henry Montgomery Campbell (1887–1970), Church of England bishop
- Henry Campbell (MP) (1856–1924), Irish nationalist politician
- Henry Colin Campbell (died 1930), executed by the State of New Jersey for the murder of Mildred Mowry
- Henry Arthur Campbell (1873–1953), Jamaican electrical engineer
- Henry Frederick Campbell (1769–1856), soldier of the British Army
- Henry Roe Campbell (1807–1879), American surveyor and civil engineer
- Henry LeRoy Campbell (1915–2007), American football player
- Henry Cummings Campbell (1919–2009), Canadian educator and librarian

== See also ==
- Harry Campbell (disambiguation)
- Henry Campbell-Bannerman (1836–1908), Prime Minister of the United Kingdom
