= Alex Bradley (footballer) =

English-Finnish footballer (born 1999)

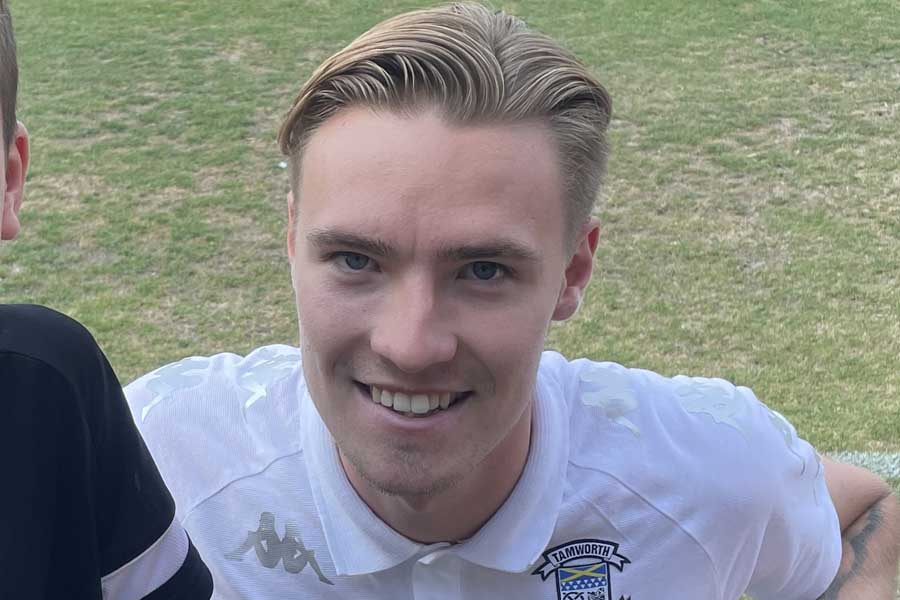
- Bradley with Tamworth in August 2022

Personal information
- Full name: Alexander Benjamin Bradley
- Date of birth: 27 January 1999 (age 27)
- Place of birth: Worcester, England
- Height: 1.81 m (5 ft 11 in)
- Position: Midfielder

Team information
- Current team: Stourbridge

Youth career
- 2006–2018: West Bromwich Albion

Senior career*
Years	Team	Apps	(Gls)
2018–2019	West Bromwich Albion	0	(0)
2018–2019	→ Havant & Waterlooville (loan)	9	(2)
2019	→ Burton Albion (loan)	7	(1)
2019–2021	Lincoln City	0	(0)
2019–2020	→ Harrogate Town (loan)	23	(3)
2020–2021	→ Yeovil Town (loan)	4	(0)
2021–2022	Yeovil Town	39	(1)
2022–2023	Tamworth	20	(1)
2023–2024	Walsall Wood	20	(9)
2024–	Stourbridge	18	(5)

International career^{‡}
2015	Finland U17	2	(0)
2018	Finland U19	5	(0)
- * Club domestic league appearances and goals as of 18:18, 31 December 2024 (UTC) ‡ National team caps and goals as of 22:00, 7 August 2022 (UTC)

Alexander Benjamin Bradley (born 27 January 1999) is a footballer who plays for Southern League Premier Division Central club Stourbridge, as a midfielder. Born in England, he is a former Finnish youth international.

== Early life ==
Bradley was born in Worcester. He is half-Finnish; his mother is from Finland. He attended Royal Grammar School Worcester.

== Club career ==
=== West Bromwich Albion ===
Bradley joined West Bromwich Albion at the age of 7. He spent the first half of the 2018–19 season on loan at Havant & Waterlooville, before moving on loan to Burton Albion in January 2019. He was released by West Brom at the end of his contract

=== Lincoln City ===
After a successful trial, he joined Lincoln City on 24 July 2019. He moved on loan to Harrogate Town in August 2019. A year after first joining Lincoln, he would make his debut starting the game in the EFL Cup on 5 September 2020.

=== Yeovil Town ===
On 3 November 2020, he joined Yeovil Town on a short-term loan until 10 January 2021. He made his debut on 14 November, playing the full 90 minutes of a 1–1 draw at Woking. On 11 January 2021, Bradley signed for Yeovil on a permanent 18-month contract. At the end of the 2021–22 season, Bradley was released by Yeovil following the expiry of his contract.

=== Tamworth ===
On 28 June 2022, Alex signed for Southern League Premier Division Central side Tamworth.

Bradley made his debut for Tamworth on 6 August 2022, in a Southern League Premier Division Central fixture at home to Ilkeston Town; Bradley was substituted on the 75th minute for Alex Jones. The match finished 1-1.

=== Walsall Wood ===
On 5 June 2023, Bradley signed for newly promoted Northern Premier League Division One Midlands club Walsall Wood.

=== Stourbridge ===
On 15 June 2024, Bradley signed for Stourbridge.

== International career ==
He has represented Finland at international youth levels, and played at the 2018 UEFA European Under-19 Championship.

== Career statistics ==
As of match played 14 December 2024

Appearances and goals by club, season and competition
Club	Season	League			FA Cup		League Cup		Other		Total	
Club	Season	Division	Apps	Goals	Apps	Goals	Apps	Goals	Apps	Goals	Apps	Goals
West Bromwich Albion U23	2016–17	—			—		—		1 (Note: Appearance(s) in EFL Trophy)	0	1	0
West Bromwich Albion U23	2017–18	—			—		—		3	0	3	0
West Bromwich Albion U23	2018–19	—			—		—		1	1	1	1
West Bromwich Albion U23	Total		—		—		—		5	1	5	1
West Bromwich Albion	2016–17	Premier League	0	0	0	0	0	0	—		0	0
West Bromwich Albion	2017–18	Premier League	0	0	0	0	0	0	—		0	0
West Bromwich Albion	2018–19	Championship	0	0	0	0	0	0	—		0	0
West Bromwich Albion	Total		0	0	0	0	0	0	—		0	0
Havant and Waterlooville (loan)	2018–19	National League	9	2	1	0	—		1 (Note: Appearance(s) in the FA Trophy)	0	11	2
Burton Albion (loan)	2018–19	League One	7	1	—		—		—		7	1
Lincoln City	2019–20	League One	0	0	0	0	0	0	0	0	0	0
Lincoln City	2020–21	League One	0	0	0	0	2	0	1	0	3	0
Lincoln City	Total		0	0	0	0	2	0	1	0	3	0
Harrogate Town (loan)	2019–20	National League	22	3	1	0	—		4	1	27	4
Yeovil Town (loan)	2020–21	National League	4	0	2	0	—		—		6	0
Yeovil Town	2020–21	National League	17	0	—		—		—		17	0
Yeovil Town	2021–22	National League	22	1	2	0	—		6 (Note: Two appearances in FA Trophy, four appearances and one goal in Somerset Premier Cup)	1	30	2
Yeovil Town	Total		39	1	2	0	—		6	1	47	2
Tamworth	2022–23	Southern League Premier Division Central	20	1	1	0	—		6 (Note: Five appearances and one goal in FA Trophy, one appearance in Birmingham Senior Cup)	1	27	2
Walsall Wood	2023–24	Northern Premier League Midlands Division	20	9	1	0	—		7 (Note: Six appearances and one goal in FA Trophy, one appearance and two goals in Walsall Senior Cup)	3	28	12
Stourbridge	2024–25	Southern League Premier Division Central	18	5	0	0	—		2	1	20	6
Career total			139	22	8	0	2	0	32	8	181	30
