= Harold Campbell =

Harold Campbell may refer to:

- Harold Campbell (courtier) (1888–1969), British sailor, civil servant and courtier
- Harold Campbell (co-operator) (1913–2002), British co-operative activist
- Harold D. Campbell (1895–1955), United States Marine Corps general

== See also ==
- Harry Campbell (disambiguation)
