= Reece Hutchinson =

English footballer (born 2000)

Personal information
- Full name: Reece Christopher Hutchinson
- Date of birth: 14 April 2000 (age 26)
- Place of birth: Birmingham, England
- Height: 5 ft 8 in (1.73 m)
- Position: Left-back

Team information
- Current team: Crewe Alexandra
- Number: 3

Youth career
- –2017: Burton Albion

Senior career*
Years	Team	Apps	(Gls)
2017–2021	Burton Albion	43	(0)
2017–2018	→ Romulus (loan)	12	(0)
2021–2023	Cheltenham Town	9	(0)
2023	→ Sligo Rovers (loan)	19	(1)
2023–2025	Sligo Rovers	66	(5)
2025–	Crewe Alexandra	56	(5)
- * Club domestic league appearances and goals as of 16:22, 21 November 2026 (UTC)

Reece Christopher Hutchinson (born 14 April 2000) is an English professional footballer who plays as a defender for EFL League Two club Crewe Alexandra.

== Career ==
=== Burton Albion ===
Hutchinson came through the academy at Burton Albion and said it was a "dream come true" to feature against Aston Villa – the club he supported as a boy – in a 2018–19 pre-season friendly, having previously made the substitute bench in an EFL Championship fixture with Derby County in April 2018. Prior to that, he had signed his first professional contract with the "Brewers" in May 2018 following a successful loan spell at Northern Premier League Division One South side Romulus. He made his debut under manager Nigel Clough in the English Football League on 11 August 2018, coming on as a substitute for Damien McCrory 17 minutes into a 3–1 defeat at Gillingham. He made his first start in EFL League One on 1 September, in a 3–0 victory over AFC Wimbledon at Pirelli Stadium.

On 12 May 2021 it was announced that he would be one of 12 players leaving Burton at the end of the season.

=== Cheltenham Town ===
On 11 January 2022, Hutchinson signed a short-term deal with Cheltenham Town until the end of the season.

=== Sligo Rovers ===
On 2 February 2023, Hutchinson signed for League of Ireland Premier Division club Sligo Rovers on loan until the end of June. He scored the first goal of his senior career on 6 March 2023 when he opened the scoring in a 2–1 win at home to St Patrick's Athletic. On 16 May 2023, Sligo Rovers announced the permanent signing of Hutchinson, once his loan expired on 1 July, with the left-back signing a contract until the end of the 2024 season. He signed a new contract with the club ahead of the 2025 season, after playing every league game in 2024, scoring twice, before featuring in all of his side's first 21 league games of 2025, scoring three goals and assisting two, form that drew interest from EFL League Two club Crewe Alexandra ahead of the July transfer window opening.

=== Crewe Alexandra ===
On 30 June 2025, it was announced that he had joined EFL League Two side Crewe Alexandra after they met his release clause. He made his debut in Crewe's 3–1 victory at Salford City on 2 August 2025, and a week later scored on his home debut as Crewe beat Accrington Stanley 2–0. He was subsequently nominated for EFL League Two Player of the Month for August 2025.

== Career statistics ==
As of match played 21 November 2026

Appearances and goals by club, season and competition
Club	Season	League			National Cup		League Cup		Other		Total	
Club	Season	Division	Apps	Goals	Apps	Goals	Apps	Goals	Apps	Goals	Apps	Goals
Burton Albion	2017–18	Championship	0	0	0	0	0	0	0	0	0	0
Burton Albion	2018–19	League One	25	0	0	0	5	0	1 (Note: Appearance(s) in the Football League Trophy)	0	31	0
Burton Albion	2019–20	League One	17	0	1	0	3	0	2	0	23	0
Burton Albion	2020–21	League One	1	0	0	0	0	0	1	0	2	0
Burton Albion	Total		43	0	1	0	8	0	4	0	56	0
Romulus (loan)	2017–18	NPL Division One South	12	0	0	0	0	0	0	0	12	0
Cheltenham Town	2021–22	League One	6	0	0	0	0	0	0	0	6	0
Cheltenham Town	2022–23	League One	3	0	0	0	0	0	2	0	5	0
Cheltenham Town	Total		9	0	0	0	0	0	2	0	11	0
Sligo Rovers (loan)	2023	LOI Premier Division	19	1	–		–		–		19	1
Sligo Rovers	2023	LOI Premier Division	9	0	0	0	–		–		9	0
Sligo Rovers	2024	LOI Premier Division	36	2	2	0	–		–		38	2
Sligo Rovers	2025	LOI Premier Division	22	3	–		–		–		22	3
Sligo Rovers	Total		67	5	2	0	–		–		69	5
Crewe Alexandra	2025–26	League Two	45	4	1	0	0	0	1	0	47	4
Crewe Alexandra	2026–27	League Two	11	1	1	0	2	0	0	0	14	1
Crewe Alexandra	Total		56	5	2	0	2	0	1	0	61	5
Career total			206	11	5	0	10	0	7	0	228	11
