= Jake Hesketh =

English footballer

Personal information
- Full name: Jake Alexander Hesketh
- Date of birth: 27 March 1996 (age 30)
- Place of birth: Stockport, England
- Height: 5 ft 6 in (1.68 m)
- Position: Attacking midfielder

Team information
- Current team: Sholing
- Number: 10

Youth career
- 2006–2014: Southampton

Senior career*
Years	Team	Apps	(Gls)
2014–2021	Southampton	2	(0)
2018–2019	→ Burton Albion (loan)	16	(1)
2019	→ Milton Keynes Dons (loan)	16	(2)
2019–2020	→ Lincoln City (loan)	20	(1)
2020–2021	→ Crawley Town (loan)	15	(0)
2021–2023	Eastleigh	54	(2)
2023–	Sholing	0	(0)
- * Club domestic league appearances and goals as of 17:04, 31 May 2023 (UTC)

Jake Alexander Hesketh (born 27 March 1996) is an English professional footballer who plays as an attacking midfielder for Southern League Premier Division South club Sholing.

== Early and personal life ==
Hesketh was born in Stockport, Greater Manchester, but his family moved to Whiteley, near Fareham, Hampshire when he was six months old. He studied at Whiteley Primary School before moving onto Swanmore College.

== Club career ==
=== Southampton ===
Hesketh started his career at Southampton's academy, first training with the club as an under-7 before signing with the club as an under-nine, the youngest at which he could sign, having previously been scouted at a local tournament playing for Crofton Saints Football Club. After progressing through the club's academy, he completed a two-year scholarship with the club and after finishing as the Under-18 team's top scorer was awarded the 2013–14 Scholar of the Season accolade at the Southampton club awards ceremony. He signed a three-year professional contract the same day, having spent the previous six weeks training and playing with the club's under-21 team.

He was promoted into the first team by coach Ronald Koeman due to injury problems among the squad. He made his debut for the club on 8 December 2014 in a Premier League match against Manchester United, being brought in as a substitute for Dušan Tadić in the 70th minute of the 2–1 home defeat. Five days later Hesketh made his first Premier League start as Southampton lost 1–0 away to Burnley. Hesketh made 22 appearances for Martin Hunter's Under-21s in 2014–15, scoring two goals and lifting the 2015 U21 Premier League Cup. He failed to make a first team appearance during the 2015–16 season as he was not part of Koeman's first-team plans, but returned to the first-team following the arrival of Claude Puel as manager in summer 2016. After an appearance for the Southampton under-23 team in the EFL Trophy in August 2016, he made his first first-team appearance of the season and scored his first senior goal on 22 September 2016, in a 2–0 win over Crystal Palace in the EFL Cup. Hesketh played again in a 0–0 UEFA Europa League draw away to Hapoel Beer Sheva a week later, but picked up an injury in October and failed to make any more appearances that season. In December 2016, he signed a new four-and-a-half-year contract with the club. Puel was sacked as manager in summer 2017, with Southampton being managed by Mauricio Pellegrino and later Mark Hughes, and Hesketh failed to make a first-team appearance during the 2017–18 season.

==== Loan spells ====
On 30 August 2018, Hesketh signed for Burton Albion on a loan deal until 2 January 2019. He scored his first league goal in a 2–2 draw at Portsmouth on 23 October 2018. He appeared 23 times for Burton, scoring three goals. On 31 January 2019, Hesketh joined League Two club Milton Keynes Dons on loan for the remainder of the 2018–19 season. He made his debut for the club as a substitute in a 3–1 defeat to Exeter City on 2 February 2019, before scoring his first goal for the club on 9 February in a 3–2 defeat to Swindon Town. He amassed 16 appearances in total across his loan spell, and scored twice.

On 2 September 2019, he joined League One club Lincoln City on loan for the remainder of the 2019–20 season. He appeared in 24 matches and scored one goal across the 2019–20 season.

He joined League Two club Crawley Town on a season-long loan on 16 October 2020. He made his debut for the club on 20 October 2020 as a substitute in a 2–1 defeat to Exeter City in League Two. On 31 October 2020, Hesketh was given a red card in Crawley's 2–1 win over Cambridge United.

After 17 years at Southampton, Hesketh announced that he would leave the club at the end of the 2020–21 season after the expiry of his contract.

=== Eastleigh ===
Following his release by Southampton in June 2021, Hesketh signed for Eastleigh on 2 August. He was released at the end of the 2022–23 season.

=== Sholing ===
On 31 May 2023, Hesketh signed for Southern League Premier Division side Sholing. On 17 April 2025, he signed a contract extension with Sholing.

== Style of play ==
Hesketh's preferred position is as an attacking midfielder, but is also able to play as a central midfielder or as a wide midfielder.

== Career statistics ==
As of end of 2022–23 season

Appearances and goals by club, season and competition
Season	Club	League			FA Cup		League Cup		Other		Total	
Season	Club	Division	Apps	Goals	Apps	Goals	Apps	Goals	Apps	Goals	Apps	Goals
Southampton	2014–15	Premier League	2	0	0	0	0	0	—		2	0
Southampton	2015–16	Premier League	0	0	0	0	0	0	—		0	0
Southampton	2016–17	Premier League	0	0	0	0	1	1	1 (Note: Appearance(s) in Europa League)	0	2	1
Southampton	2017–18	Premier League	0	0	0	0	0	0	—		0	0
Southampton	2018–19	Premier League	0	0	0	0	0	0	—		0	0
Southampton	2019–20	Premier League	0	0	0	0	0	0	—		0	0
Southampton	2020–21	Premier League	0	0	0	0	0	0	—		0	0
Southampton	Total		2	0	0	0	1	1	1	0	4	1
Southampton U23	2016–17	—			—		—		2 (Note: Appearance(s) in EFL Trophy)	0	2	0
Southampton U23	2017–18	—			—		—		1	2	1	2
Southampton U23	2020–21	—			—		—		2	0	2	0
Southampton U23	Total		—		—		—		5	2	5	2
Burton Albion (loan)	2018–19	League One	16	1	1	0	3	2	3	0	23	3
Milton Keynes Dons (loan)	2018–19	League Two	16	2	0	0	0	0	0	0	16	2
Lincoln City (loan)	2019–20	League One	20	1	2	0	0	0	2	0	24	1
Crawley Town (loan)	2020–21	League Two	15	0	0	0	0	0	0	0	15	0
Eastleigh	2021–22	National League	31	2	3	1	—		1 (Note: Appearance in FA Trophy)	3	34	6
Eastleigh	2022–23	National League	23	0	1	0	—		2	0	26	0
Eastleigh	Total		54	2	4	1	0	0	3	3	60	6
Career total			123	6	7	1	4	3	14	5	148	15

== Honours ==
=== Club ===
Southampton

- U21 Premier League Cup: 2014–15

Milton Keynes Dons

- EFL League Two third-place promotion: 2018–19
