= 2019–20 Lincoln City F.C. season =

Lincoln City
2019–20 season
- Chairman: Clive Nates
- Manager: Danny Cowley (until 9 September); Michael Appleton (from 20 September)
- Stadium: Sincil Bank, Lincoln
- League One: 16th (based on points-per-game following Covid-19)
- FA Cup: First round (vs. Ipswich Town
- EFL Cup: Second round (vs. Everton)
- EFL Trophy: Group stage
- Top goalscorer: League: Tyler Walker (14); All: Tyler Walker (16)
- Highest home attendance: 10,264 (vs. Sunderland; League 1)
- Lowest home attendance: 1,860 (vs. Rotherham United; EFL Trophy)
- Average home league attendance: 8,986
Home colours	Away colours	Third colours

The 2019–20 season was Lincoln City's 136th season in their history and their first season back in League One after being promoted as champions out of League Two in the 2018/2019 season. Along with League One, the club also participated in the FA Cup, EFL Cup and EFL Trophy.

The season covered the period from 1 July 2019 to 30 June 2020.

== Pre-season ==
As of 30 May 2019, Lincoln City announced six pre-season friendlies against Stoke City, Nottingham Forest, Lincoln United, Gainsborough Trinity, Scunthorpe United and Sheffield Wednesday.

6 July 2019 Friendly	Lincoln United	1–4	Lincoln City	Gainsborough
13:00 BST		Report	Adebayo-Smith 1', 48', 68'; Trialist 52'	Stadium: Gainsborough Martin & Co. Arena

6 July 2019 Friendly	Gainsborough Trinity	0–3	Lincoln City	Gainsborough
15:00 BST		Report	Chapman 10'; Toffolo 25'; Grant 50' (pen.)	Stadium: Gainsborough Martin & Co. Arena

13 July 2019 Friendly	Lincoln City	1–3	Sheffield Wednesday	Lincoln
13:00 BST	Adebayo-Smith 75'	Report	Rhodes 1'; Reach 24'; Eardley 60' (o.g.)	Stadium: Sincil Bank

20 July 2019 Friendly	Lincoln City	1–0	Reading	Marbella, Spain
11:00 CETS				Stadium: Estadio Municipal de Marbella

24 July 2019 Friendly	Lincoln City	1–2	Stoke City	Lincoln
19:45 BST	Pett 72'	Report	Campbell 10', 21'	Stadium: Sincil Bank; Attendance: 3,644

27 July 2019 Friendly	Scunthorpe United	2–0	Lincoln City	Scunthorpe
13:00 BST	Hammill 24'; Trialist 42'	Report		Stadium: Glanford Park; Attendance: 1,623

29 July 2019 Friendly	Lincoln City	1–1	Nottingham Forest XI	Lincoln
19:30 BST	Bostwick 35'	Report	Gomis 73'	Stadium: Sincil Bank; Attendance: 3,803

== Competitions ==
=== League One ===
==== League table ====
Pos	Team	Pld	W	D	L	GF	GA	GD	Pts	PPG
12	Burton Albion	35	12	12	11	50	50	0	48	1.37
13	Blackpool	35	11	12	12	44	43	+1	45	1.29
14	Bristol Rovers	35	12	9	14	38	49	−11	45	1.29
15	Shrewsbury Town	34	10	11	13	31	42	−11	41	1.21
16	Lincoln City	35	12	6	17	44	46	−2	42	1.20
17	Accrington Stanley	35	10	10	15	47	53	−6	40	1.14
18	Rochdale	34	10	6	18	39	57	−18	36	1.06
19	Milton Keynes Dons	35	10	7	18	36	47	−11	37	1.06
20	AFC Wimbledon	35	8	11	16	39	52	−13	35	1.00

Source: EFL Official Website
Rules for classification: 1) Points per game; 2) Goal difference; 3) Number of goals scored; 4) Head-to-head results; 5) Wins; 6) Away goals; 7) Penalty points (sec 9.5); 8) 12-point sending-off offences

==== Results summary ====
Overall								Home						Away					
Pld	W	D	L	GF	GA	GD	Pts	W	D	L	GF	GA	GD	W	D	L	GF	GA	GD
35	12	6	17	44	46	−2	42	10	3	4	28	18	+10	2	3	13	16	28	−12

==== Results by matchday ====
Matchday	1	2	3	4	5	6	7	8	9	10	11	12	13	14	15	16	17	18	19	20	21	22	23	24	25	26	27	28	29	30	31	32	33	34	35
Ground	H	A	H	A	A	H	A	H	A	H	A	H	A	H	A	A	A	A	H	A	A	H	H	A	A	H	H	A	H	A	H	H	A	H	H
Result	W	W	W	L	L	W	L	L	D	L	L	W	L	D	L	D	L	W	W	L	L	W	W	L	D	W	W	L	L	L	L	D	L	D	W
Position	3	2	1	2	7	2	5	7	8	10	11	11	12	12	15	17	17	17	15	16	17	17	16	16	16	15	12	12	14	14	15	14	15	15	14

A = Away; H = Home; W = Win; D = Draw; L = Loss

==== Matches ====
On 20 June 2019 the EFL League One fixtures were revealed.

3 August 2019 1	Lincoln City	2–0	Accrington Stanley	Lincoln
15:00 BST	O'Connor 35'; Akinde 81' (pen.)	Report		Stadium: Sincil Bank; Attendance: 8,668; Referee: Tony Harrington

10 August 2019 2	Rotherham United	0–2	Lincoln City	Rotherham
15:00 BST		Report	MacDonald 42' (o.g.); Anderson 48'	Stadium: New York Stadium; Attendance: 10,706; Referee: Lee Swabey

17 August 2019 3	Lincoln City	4–0	Southend United	Lincoln
15:00 BST	Shackell 31'; Toffolo 40'; Walker 48' (pen.); Andrade 81'	Report		Stadium: Sincil Bank; Attendance: 9,016; Referee: Andy Haines

20 August 2019 4	Milton Keynes Dons	2–1	Lincoln City	Milton Keynes
19:45 BST	Brittain 2'; Williams 23'	Report	Walker 11'	Stadium: Stadium MK; Attendance: 8,166; Referee: Michael Salisbury

24 August 2019 5	Doncaster Rovers	2–1	Lincoln City	Doncaster
12:30 BST	Ennis 13'; Taylor 83'	Report	Grant 57'	Stadium: Keepmoat Stadium; Attendance: 10,177; Referee: Craig Hicks

31 August 2019 6	Lincoln City	2–0	Fleetwood Town	Lincoln
15:00 BST	Walker 34', 35'	Report		Stadium: Sincil Bank; Attendance: 8,361; Referee: Steve Martin

7 September 2019 7	Wycombe Wanderers	3–1	Lincoln City	High Wycombe
15:00 BST	Jacobson 5', 36', 75'	Report	Akinde 50'	Stadium: Adams Park; Attendance: 5,562; Referee: Chris Sarginson

14 September 2019 8	Lincoln City	0–1	Bristol Rovers	Lincoln
15:00 BST		Report	Clarke-Harris 66' (pen.)	Stadium: Sincil Bank; Attendance: 8,712; Referee: Carl Boyeson

17 September 2019 9	Rochdale	1–1	Lincoln City	Spotland
19:45 BST	Dooley 13'	Report	Walker 86'	Stadium: Crown Oil Arena; Attendance: 2,659; Referee: Ross Joyce

21 September 2019 10	Lincoln City	0–6	Oxford United	Lincoln
15:00 BST		Report	Fosu 5', 40', 70'; Mackie 48'; Henry 54'; Taylor 79'	Stadium: Sincil Bank; Attendance: 8,746; Referee: Anthony Backhouse

27 September 2019 11	Blackpool	2–1	Lincoln City	Blackpool
19:45 BST	Scannell 11'; Thompson 21'	Report	Payne 24'	Stadium: Bloomfield Road; Attendance: 9,203; Referee: Oliver Yates

5 October 2019 12	Lincoln City	2–0	Sunderland	Lincoln
15:00 BST	Walker 18' (penalty missed) 52' 59'	Report		Stadium: Sincil Bank; Attendance: 10,264; Referee: Brett Huxtable

12 October 2019 13	Peterborough United	2–0	Lincoln City	Peterborough
15:00 BST	Reed 82'; Toney 88'	Report		Stadium: Weston Homes Stadium; Attendance: 9,872; Referee: Marc Edwards

18 October 2019 14	Lincoln City	0–0	Shrewsbury Town	Lincoln
19:45 BST	Bolger (red card) 80'	Report		Stadium: Sincil Bank; Attendance: 8,710; Referee: Josh Smith

22 October 2019 15	Portsmouth	1–0	Lincoln City	Milton
19:45 BST	Marquis 28'	Report		Stadium: Fratton Park; Attendance: 17,266

2 November 2019 16	AFC Wimbledon	1–1	Lincoln City	Norbiton
15:00 BST	Appiah 90+2'	Report	Payne 31'	Stadium: Kingsmeadow; Attendance: 4,378; Referee: James Linington

16 November 2019 17	Gillingham	1–0	Lincoln City	Gillingham
15:00 BST	Mandron 24'	Report		Stadium: Priestfield Stadium; Attendance: 5,567; Referee: Christopher Pollard

7 December 2019 18	Burton Albion	0–2	Lincoln City	Burton upon Trent
15:00 GMT		Report	Anderson 2'; Walker 90+3'	Stadium: Pirelli Stadium; Attendance: 3,782; Referee: Ben Toner

14 December 2019 19	Lincoln City	1–0	Tranmere Rovers	Lincoln
15:00 BST	Akinde 77'	Report		Stadium: Sincil Bank; Attendance: 8,369; Referee: Carl Boyeson

21 December 2019 20	Coventry City	1-0	Lincoln City	Bordesley
15:00 GMT	Westbrooke 32'	Report		Stadium: St Andrew's; Attendance: 6,863; Referee: Darren Handley

26 December 2019 21	Oxford United	1-0	Lincoln City	Oxford
15:00 GMT	Baptiste 36'	Report		Stadium: Kassam Stadium; Attendance: 10,115; Referee: Will Finnie

29 December 2019 22	Lincoln City	5–3	Ipswich Town	Lincoln
15:00 BST	Anderson 6'; Walker 45+2', 72'; Bostwick 79'; Hesketh 90+2'	Report	Garbutt 32'; Toffolo 59' (o.g.); Keane 83'	Stadium: Sincil Bank; Attendance: 10,012; Referee: James Oldham

1 January 2020 23	Lincoln City	2–1	Peterborough United	Lincoln
15:00 BST	Walker 67'; Grant 90'	Report	Toney 28'; Dembélé (red card) 71'	Stadium: Sincil Bank; Attendance: 10,025; Referee: Chris Sarginson

4 January 2020 24	Sunderland	3–1	Lincoln City	Sunderland
15:00 GMT	Flanagan 19'; Gooch 23', 29'	Report	Walker 66'	Stadium: Stadium of Light; Attendance: 31,748; Referee: Leigh Doughty

11 January 2020 25	Shrewsbury Town	1–1	Lincoln City	Shrewsbury
15:00 GMT	Norburn 36' (pen.)	Report	Walker 48' (pen.)	Stadium: Montgomery Waters Meadow; Attendance: 6,275; Referee: Andy Haines

14 January 2020 26	Lincoln City	5–1	Bolton Wanderers	Lincoln
19:45 BST	Anderson 7'; Walker 61'; Emmanuel 85' (o.g.); Akinde 86', 90'	Report	Darcy 47'	Stadium: Sincil Bank; Attendance: 8,882

18 January 2020 27	Lincoln City	1–0	Blackpool	Lincoln
15:00 GMT	John-Jules 64'	Report		Stadium: Sincil Bank; Attendance: 8,929; Referee: Ollie Yates

25 January 2020 28	Ipswich Town	1–0	Lincoln City	Ipswich
15:00 GMT	Woolfenden 44'	Report		Stadium: Portman Road; Attendance: 18,795; Referee: Lee Swabey

28 January 2020 29	Lincoln City	0–2	Portsmouth	Lincoln
19:45 GMT		Report	Curtis 45+5'; Marquis 86' (pen.)	Stadium: Sincil Bank; Attendance: 8,983; Referee: Ben Toner

1 February 2020 30	Southend United	2–1	Lincoln City	Southend-on-Sea
15:00 GMT	Kelman 63'; Bwomono 90+5'	Report	Anderson 89'	Stadium: Roots Hall; Attendance: 6,605; Referee: Charles Breakspear

7 February 2020 31	Lincoln City	0–1	Rotherham United	Lincoln
19:45 GMT		Report	Crooks 47'	Stadium: Sincil Bank; Attendance: 9,876; Referee: Martin Coy

11 February 2020 32	Lincoln City	1–1	Milton Keynes Dons	Lincoln
19:45 GMT	Bridcutt 22'	Report	Healey 3'	Stadium: Sincil Bank; Attendance: 7,783; Referee: John Busby

15 February 2020 33	Accrington Stanley	4–3	Lincoln City	Accrington
15:00 GMT	Shackell 36' (o.g.); Charles (penalty missed) 48'; Pritchard 70'; Conneely 78'; Finley 90+5'	Report	Scully 30'; Lewis 53'; Shackell 76'	Stadium: Wham Stadium; Attendance: 2,279; Referee: Christopher Pollard

22 February 2020 34	Lincoln City	0–0	Gillingham	Lincoln
15:00 GMT	Edun (red card) 90'	Report		Stadium: Sincil Bank; Attendance: 8,950; Referee: Tom Nield

7 March 2020 35	Lincoln City	3–2	Burton Albion	Lincoln
15:00 GMT	Hopper 21', 38'; Scully 62'	Report	Powell 6', 30'; Akins (penalty missed) 80'	Stadium: Sincil Bank; Attendance: 8,474; Referee: Scott Oldham

14 March 2020	Tranmere Rovers	v	Lincoln City	Birkenhead
15:00 GMT				Stadium: Prenton Park
Note: Season was suspended until 3 April 2020, due to the COVID-19 pandemic.

21 March 2020	Lincoln City	v	Coventry City	Lincoln
15:00 GMT				Stadium: Sincil Bank
Note: Season was suspended until 3 April 2020, due to the COVID-19 pandemic.

28 March 2020	Lincoln City	v	AFC Wimbledon	Lincoln
15:00 GMT				Stadium: Sincil Bank
Note: Season was suspended until 3 April 2020, due to the COVID-19 pandemic.

4 April 2020	Bolton Wanderers	v	Lincoln City	Horwich
15:00 GMT				Stadium: University of Bolton Stadium
Note: On 3 April, the English Football League decided to postpone all football until safe to do so due to the COVID-19 pandemic.

10 April 2020	Lincoln City	v	Doncaster Rovers	Lincoln
15:00 BST				Stadium: Sincil Bank
Note: On 3 April, the English Football League decided to postpone all football until safe to do so due to the COVID-19 pandemic.

13 April 2020	Fleetwood Town	v	Lincoln City	Fleetwood
13:00 BST				Stadium: Highbury Stadium
Note: On 3 April, the English Football League decided to postpone all football until safe to do so due to the COVID-19 pandemic.

18 April 2020	Lincoln City	v	Wycombe Wanderers	Lincoln
15:00 BST				Stadium: Sincil Bank
Note: On 3 April, the English Football League decided to postpone all football until safe to do so due to the COVID-19 pandemic.

25 April 2020	Bristol Rovers	v	Lincoln City	Horfield
15:00 BST				Stadium: Memorial Stadium
Note: On 3 April, the English Football League decided to postpone all football until safe to do so due to the COVID-19 pandemic.

3 May 2020	Lincoln City	v	Rochdale	Lincoln
15:00 BST				Stadium: Sincil Bank
Note: On 3 April, the English Football League decided to postpone all football until safe to do so due to the COVID-19 pandemic.

=== FA Cup ===
The first round draw was made on 21 October 2019.

9 November 2019 First round	Ipswich Town	1–1	Lincoln City	Ipswich
15:00 BST	Dozzell 79'	Report	Walker 37' (penalty missed) 75	Stadium: Portman Road; Attendance: 11,598; Referee: Kevin Johnson

20 November 2019 First round replay	Lincoln City	0–1	Ipswich Town	Lincoln
19:45 GMT		Report	Donacien (yellow card) 26'; Judge 90+4'	Stadium: Sincil Bank; Attendance: 6,781; Referee: Andy Haines

=== EFL Cup ===
The first round draw was made on 20 June. The second round draw was made on 13 August 2019 following the conclusion of all but one first-round matches.

13 August 2019 First round	Huddersfield Town	0–1	Lincoln City	Huddersfield
19:45 BST		Report	Anderson 55'	Stadium: John Smith's Stadium; Attendance: 6,908; Referee: Peter Wright

28 August 2019 Second round	Lincoln City	2–4	Everton	Lincoln
19:45 BST	Anderson 1'; Andrade 70'	Report	Digne 36'; Sigurðsson 59' (pen.); Iwobi 81'; Richarlison 88'	Stadium: Sincil Bank; Attendance: 9,971; Referee: Darren Bond

=== EFL Trophy ===
On 9 July 2019, the pre-determined group stage draw was announced with Invited clubs to be drawn on 12 July 2019.

Pos	Div	Team	Pld	W	PW	PL	L	GF	GA	GD	Pts	Qualification
1	ACA	Manchester United U21	3	3	0	0	0	5	1	+4	9	Advance to Round 2
2	L1	Doncaster Rovers	3	1	0	0	2	6	6	0	3	Advance to Round 2
3	L1	Lincoln City	3	1	0	0	2	4	4	0	3	
4	L1	Rotherham United	3	1	0	0	2	3	7	−4	3	

Source: EFL.com

27 August 2019	Lincoln City	P–P	Manchester United U21	Lincoln
19:45 BST				Stadium: Sincil Bank
Note: The match was postponed due to Lincoln's progression in the EFL Cup.

3 September 2019 Group Game 1	Doncaster Rovers	3–1	Lincoln City	Doncaster
19:45 BST	John 55'; Sterling 69'; May 80'	Report	Akinde 43'	Stadium: The Keepmoat Stadium; Attendance: 2,170; Referee: Scott Oldham

1 October 2019 Group Game 2	Lincoln City	0–1	Manchester United U21	Lincoln
19:45 BST		Report	Garner 20'	Stadium: Sincil Bank; Attendance: 3,532; Referee: Rob Lewis

12 November 2019 Group Game 3	Lincoln City	3–0	Rotherham United	Lincoln
19:45 BST	Akinde 12' 14'; Walker 87'	Report		Stadium: Sincil Bank; Attendance: 1,860; Referee: James OIdham

== Transfers ==
=== Transfers in ===
Date from	Position	Nationality	Name	From	Fee	Ref.
3 July 2019	AM	ENG	Jack Payne	Huddersfield Town	Free transfer	
5 July 2019	LM	ENG	Jorge Grant	Nottingham Forest	Undisclosed	
24 July 2019	CM	FIN	Alex Bradley	West Bromwich Albion	Free transfer	
10 August 2019	RB	WAL	Aaron Lewis	Swansea City	Free transfer	
23 August 2019	DF	ENG	Ben Coker	Southend United	Free transfer	
1 January 2020	MF	IRE	Zack Elbouzedi	Waterford	Undisclosed	
10 January 2020	LB	ENG	Tayo Edun	Fulham	Undisclosed	
10 January 2020	LB	ENG	Max Melbourne	West Bromwich Albion	Undisclosed	
23 January 2020	FW	ENG	Tom Hopper	Southend United	Undisclosed	
30 January 2020	LB	ENG	Akeem Hinds	Rotherham United	Free transfer	
31 January 2020	GK	ENG	Charlie Andrews	Hull City	Free transfer	
3 February 2020	FW	IRE	Anthony Scully	West Ham United	Free transfer	
2 March 2020	DF	IRE	Alan Sheehan	Unattached	Free transfer	

=== Transfers out ===
Date from	Position	Nationality	Name	To	Fee	Ref.
1 July 2019	MF	ENG	Tim Akinola	Huddersfield Town	Compensation	
25 July 2019	FW	ENG	Matt Rhead	Billericay Town	Undisclosed	
1 August 2019	GK	SCO	Matt Gilks	Fleetwood Town	Free transfer	
13 January 2020	FW	POR	Bruno Andrade	Salford City	Undisclosed	
15 January 2020	MF	NIR	Michael O'Connor	Salford City	Undisclosed	
17 January 2020	LB	ENG	Harry Toffolo	Huddersfield Town	Undisclosed	
24 January 2020	FW	ENG	John Akinde	Gillingham	Undisclosed	

=== Loans in ===
Date from	Position	Nationality	Name	From	Date until	Ref.
1 July 2019	CM	WAL	Joe Morrell	Bristol City	30 June 2020	
2 August 2019	CF	ENG	Tyler Walker	Nottingham Forest	30 January 2020	
29 August 2019	DM	ENG	Callum Connolly	Everton	6 January 2020	
2 September 2019	AM	ENG	Jake Hesketh	Southampton	30 June 2020	
2 September 2019	LB	ENG	Max Melbourne	West Bromwich Albion	6 January 2020	
10 January 2020	CF	ENG	Tyreece John-Jules	Arsenal	30 June 2020	
10 January 2020	MF	IRE	Conor Coventry	West Ham United	30 June 2020	
30 January 2020	CB	ENG	TJ Eyoma	Tottenham Hotspur	30 June 2020	
31 January 2020	DM	SCO	Liam Bridcutt	Nottingham Forest	30 June 2020	

=== Loans out ===
Date from	Position	Nationality	Name	To	Date until	Ref.
24 August 2019	CM	FIN	Alex Bradley	Harrogate Town	31 July 2020	
24 August 2019	FW	USA	Jordan Adebayo-Smith	Boston United	1 January 2020	
1 January 2020	FW	USA	Jordan Adebayo-Smith	Gainsborough Trinity	30 June 2020	
31 January 2020	GK	ENG	Grant Smith	Boreham Wood	30 June 2020	
31 January 2020	LB	ENG	Ben Coker	Cambridge United	30 June 2020	

== Squad statistics ==
=== Appearances ===
As of 10 March 2020

No.	Pos	Nat	Player	Total		League 1		FA Cup		League Cup		EFL Trophy	
No.	Pos	Nat	Player	Apps	Goals	Apps	Goals	Apps	Goals	Apps	Goals	Apps	Goals
1	GK	(England) ENG	Josh Vickers	37	0	35	0	2	0	0	0	0	0
2	MF	(Scotland) SCO	Liam Bridcutt	5	1	5	1	0	0	0	0	0	0
5	DF	(England) ENG	Jason Shackell	29	2	26	2	2	0	1	0	0	0
6	DF	(Republic of Ireland) IRL	Cian Bolger	33	0	25+3	0	1	0	2	0	2	0
7	MF	(England) ENG	Tom Pett	3	0	1+1	0	0	0	0	0	1	0
8	MF	(Republic of Ireland) IRL	Lee Frecklington	1	0	0	0	0	0	0	0	1	0
9	FW	(England) ENG	Tyreece John-Jules	7	1	7	1	0	0	0	0	0	0
10	MF	(England) ENG	Jack Payne	30	2	18+5	2	1+1	0	2	0	1+2	0
11	FW	(England) ENG	Tom Hopper	8	2	5+3	2	0	0	0	0	0	0
12	MF	(England) ENG	Ellis Chapman	17	0	5+6	0	1+1	0	1	0	3	0
16	MF	(England) ENG	Michael Bostwick	21	1	16+2	1	0	0	1+1	0	1	0
17	FW	(Republic of Ireland) IRL	Anthony Scully	5	2	3+2	2	0	0	0	0	0	0
18	MF	(England) ENG	Jorge Grant	38	2	29+3	2	1+1	0	0+1	0	3	0
19	MF	(Wales) WAL	Joe Morrell	32	0	29	0	1	0	2	0	0	0
20	MF	(Republic of Ireland) IRL	Conor Coventry	7	0	5+2	0	0	0	0	0	0	0
21	GK	(England) ENG	Grant Smith	5	0	0	0	0	0	2	0	3	0
22	DF	(Wales) WAL	Aaron Lewis	5	1	1+1	1	0	0	2	0	1	0
23	DF	(Wales) WAL	Neal Eardley	39	0	35	0	2	0	0+2	0	0	0
24	DF	(England) ENG	Max Melbourne	11	0	6+2	0	0	0	0	0	3	0
25	MF	(Republic of Ireland) IRL	Zack Elbouzedi	5	0	1+4	0	0	0	0	0	0	0
26	MF	(England) ENG	Harry Anderson	37	7	24+6	5	1+1	0	2	2	3	0
28	MF	(England) ENG	Jake Hesketh	24	1	14+6	1	2	0	0	0	2	0
33	DF	(England) ENG	Ben Coker	1	0	0	0	0	0	0	0	1	0
37	DF	(England) ENG	Tayo Edun	6	0	6	0	0	0	0	0	0	0
44	DF	(Republic of Ireland) IRL	Alan Sheehan	1	0	1	0	0	0	0	0	0	0
Players no longer at the club
3	DF	(England) ENG	Harry Toffolo	33	1	26	1	2	0	2	0	1+2	0
4	MF	(Northern Ireland) NIR	Michael O’Connor	22	1	14+3	1	1	0	1+1	0	2	0
11	FW	(Portugal) POR	Bruno Andrade	23	2	11+6	1	2	0	2	1	1+1	0
17	FW	(England) ENG	Tyler Walker	34	16	26+3	14	1+1	1	0+1	0	0+2	1
20	MF	(England) ENG	Callum Connolly	15	0	9+2	0	1	0	0	0	2+1	0
29	FW	(England) ENG	John Akinde	29	8	3+20	5	1	0	2	0	3	3
