= Harry Campbell (footballer, born 1995) =

English footballer

Personal information
- Date of birth: 16 November 1995 (age 30)
- Place of birth: Blackburn, England
- Height: 6 ft 1 in (1.85 m)
- Position: Goalkeeper

Youth career
- Blackburn Rovers
- –2016: Bolton Wanderers

Senior career*
Years	Team	Apps	(Gls)
2016–2019	Burton Albion	1	(0)
Total		1	(0)
- * Club domestic league appearances and goals

Harry Campbell (born 16 November 1995) is an English former professional footballer who played as a goalkeeper.

== Career ==
Having spent 10 years at his boyhood club Blackburn Rovers and a spell as a professional at Bolton Wanderers, Campbell joined Burton Albion in 2016.

Campbell made his professional debut in the EFL Cup on 28 August 2018 coming on as a 31st-minute substitute for the injured regular keeper, Stephen Bywater. Campbell made a last-minute penalty save from Albert Adomah to help earn Burton a 1–0 upset win against the team from a higher division. Burton would go on to reach the semi-final that season which they lost to Manchester City. Campbell's performance against Aston Villa has been called 'the greatest debut in Carabao Cup history'.

Campbell was released from Burton at the end of the 2018–19 season.
