= Jake Flannigan =

English footballer (born 1996)

Personal information
- Full name: Jake Lee Flannigan
- Date of birth: 2 February 1996 (age 30)
- Place of birth: England
- Positions: Defender; midfielder

Team information
- Current team: Sholing

Youth career
- –2018: Southampton

Senior career*
Years	Team	Apps	(Gls)
2014–2019	Southampton	0	(0)
2018–2019	→ Burton Albion (loan)	0	(0)
2019–2020	Havant & Waterlooville	5	(0)
2019	→ Hampton & Richmond (loan)	6	(0)
2020	→ Bognor Regis (loan)	6	(0)
2020–2023	Bognor Regis	7	(0)
2023–	Sholing	?	(?)
- * Club domestic league appearances and goals as of 13:43, 3 July 2023 (UTC)

Jake Lee Flannigan (born 2 February 1996) is an English professional footballer who plays as a defender or midfielder for Sholing.

== Career ==
He made his professional debut for Burton on 4 September 2018 in an EFL Trophy match against Walsall. Flannigan was released by Southampton in the summer 2019.

On 9 October 2019 Havant & Waterlooville F.C. announced that Flannigan had training with the club since the summer 2019 and that he had played on loan for Hampton & Richmond Borough F.C. on a one-month loan deal, before joining Havant & Waterlooville officially now. On 24 January 2020, he was sent out on loan for the second time, this time at Bognor Regis. The deal was extended until the end of the season in March 2020, and was then made permanent later in the year.

On 30 June 2023, Flannigan signed for Sholing.

== Personal life ==
He appeared on the 2023 BBC documentary Boot Dreams: Now or Never, about young footballers trying to gain a professional contract.
