= Owen Dale =

English footballer (born 1998)

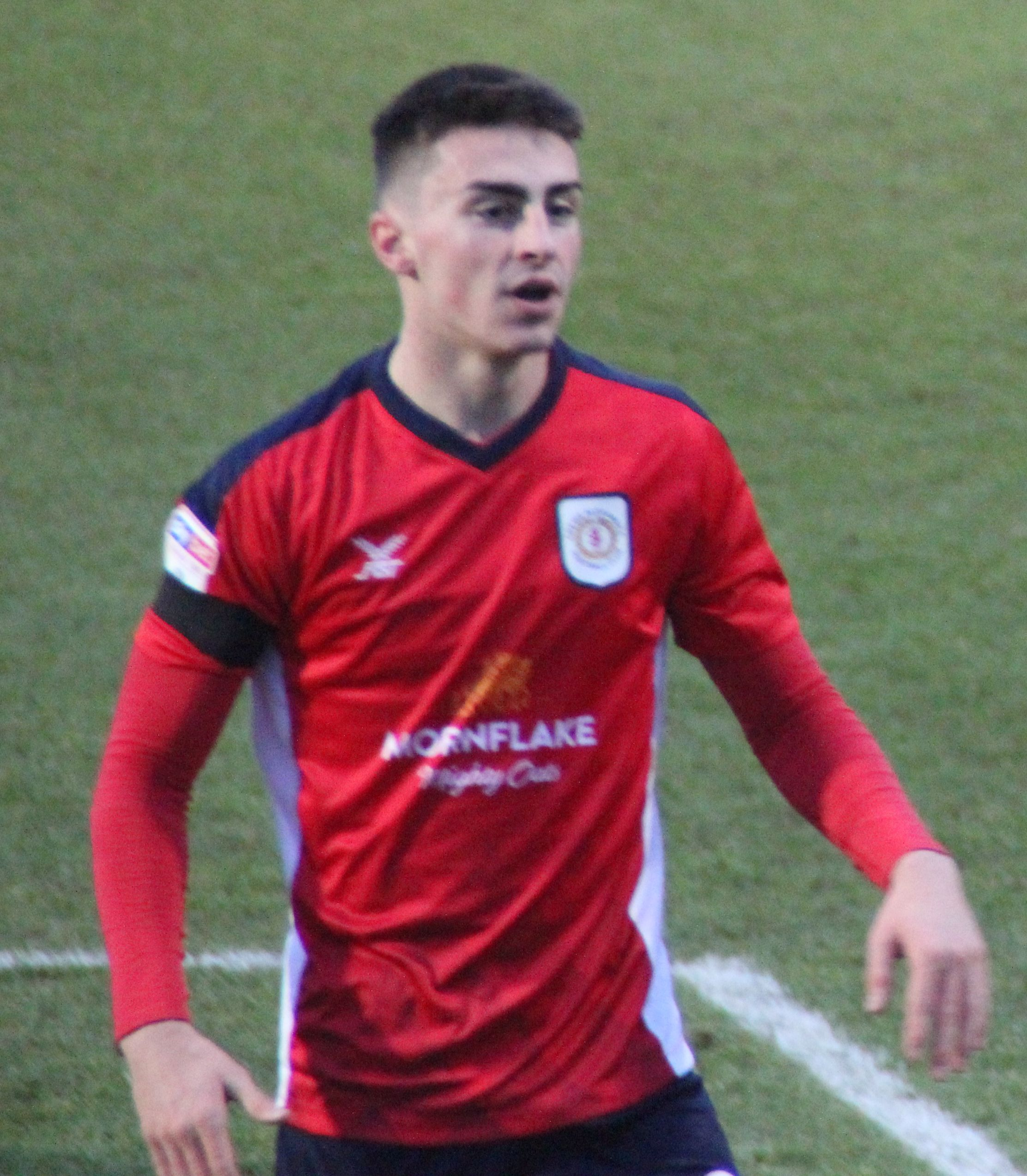
- Dale with Crewe Alexandra in 2019

Personal information
- Full name: Owen Dale
- Date of birth: 1 November 1998 (age 28)
- Place of birth: Warrington, England
- Height: 5 ft 9 in (1.75 m)
- Position: Winger

Team information
- Current team: Northampton Town
- Number: 19

Youth career
- –2016: Crewe Alexandra

Senior career*
Years	Team	Apps	(Gls)
2016–2022	Crewe Alexandra	92	(12)
2017–2018	→ Witton Albion (loan)	25	(5)
2018	→ Altrincham (loan)	12	(3)
2021–2022	→ Blackpool (loan)	7	(1)
2022–2024	Blackpool	31	(3)
2022–2023	→ Portsmouth (loan)	43	(2)
2024–2026	Oxford United	26	(1)
2025	→ Wigan Athletic (loan)	17	(1)
2025–2026	→ Plymouth Argyle (loan)	28	(1)
2026–	Northampton Town	9	(0)
- * Club domestic league appearances and goals as of 08:17, 4 November 2026 (UTC)

Owen Dale (born 1 November 1998) is an English professional footballer who plays as a winger for EFL League Two club Northampton Town.

He previously played for Plymouth Argyle, on loan from Oxford United. Signed from Blackpool in February 2024, he previously played over 100 games for Crewe Alexandra. He has had loan spells at Witton Albion, Altrincham, Blackpool, Portsmouth and Wigan Athletic.

== Career ==
=== Crewe Alexandra ===
Dale signed professional terms with Crewe in March 2016. He made his debut on 29 August 2017, coming on as a 70th minute substitute for Charlie Kirk in an EFL Trophy group stage game against Newcastle United U21s at Gresty Road. He made his league debut in Crewe's next game, coming on as a second-half substitute for Callum Ainley at Grimsby Town on 2 September 2017.

In November 2017, Dale joined Witton Albion, initially on a month's loan, later extended to the end of the 2017–18 season, scoring five times in 25 first team appearances. In August 2018, Dale joined Altrincham on a month's loan (later extended by a further month) making his debut at Darlington on 25 August. He scored his first Altrincham goal, the opener in a 3–1 home win against Alfreton Town, on 13 October 2018. He returned to his parent club in November 2018 after impressing during his time with Altrincham.

Dale scored his first senior goal for Crewe in a 6–1 defeat of Crawley Town at Gresty Road on 16 March 2019. After 26 appearances as a substitute, he made his first start in a Crewe shirt against Salford City at Gresty Road on 21 September 2019.

A contract extension clause was triggered by Crewe in June 2020. After scoring four goals in four games, Dale was named EFL League One Player of the Month for December 2020. In Crewe's end-of-season awards, Dale won four awards including Player of the Season.

==== Blackpool (loan) ====
Dale joined Blackpool on 1 September 2021. This was initially reported as a £500,000 transfer deal, but was later confirmed as a loan deal, with the option to complete a transfer in January 2022. He scored on his debut for the Lancashire club, shortly after coming on as a second-half substitute in Blackpool's 3–2 victory at Reading on 20 October 2021; he also provided an assist for one of Blackpool's other goals. However, he made just six further appearances, and returned, unfit to play, to Crewe on 11 January 2022.

=== Blackpool ===
On 13 January 2022, Blackpool signed Dale, for an undisclosed fee, on a two-year contract. On 26 April 2022, he scored his first goal as a permanent Blackpool player, in a 2–0 victory against Barnsley at Oakwell.

==== Portsmouth (loan) ====
On 7 August 2022, Dale joined Portsmouth on loan for the remainder of the 2022–23 season, making his first Pompey start in a 3–0 EFL League Cup first round win at Cardiff City on 9 August 2022, and scoring his first goal in a 3–1 victory against Bristol Rovers on 20 August 2022.

=== Oxford United ===
Dale returned to Blackpool and made 32 appearances, mainly at wing-back, but started just one League One game in December 2023 and January 2024. With under six months left on his Tangerines contract, he moved to Oxford United on 1 February 2024, making his debut two days later as a 68th minute substitute in a 1–1 home draw against Reading. He scored his first goal for Oxford in the side's 4–0 victory over Fleetwood Town on 1 April 2024.

==== Wigan Athletic (loan) ====
On 3 February 2025, Dale joined Wigan Athletic on loan to the end of the season, making his debut in the side's 2–1 FA Cup Fourth Round defeat against Fulham on 8 February 2025.

==== Plymouth Argyle (loan) ====
On 1 September 2025, Dale joined Plymouth Argyle on loan to the end of the season, making his first appearance as a second-half substitute in the side's 4–2 defeat of Stockport County on 6 September 2025. In December 2025, Dale suffered grade three ligament damage in his ankle that was anticipated to rule him out for up to three months.

On 11 May 2026, Oxford said Dale would leave in the summer when his contract expired.

=== Northampton Town ===
On 1 September 2026, Dale signed for Northampton Town.

== Career statistics ==
As of 4 November 2026

Club	Season	Division	League		FA Cup		League Cup		Other		Total	
Club	Season	Division	Apps	Goals	Apps	Goals	Apps	Goals	Apps	Goals	Apps	Goals
Crewe Alexandra	2017–18	League Two	4	0	0	0	0	0	2 (Note: Appearances in EFL Trophy)	0	6	0
Crewe Alexandra	2018–19	League Two	16	1	0	0	0	0	0	0	16	1
Crewe Alexandra	2019–20	League Two	27	0	4	1	2	0	3	1	36	2
Crewe Alexandra	2020–21	League One	43	11	2	0	1	0	2	1	48	12
Crewe Alexandra	2021–22	League One	2	0	0	0	1	0	0	0	3	0
Crewe Alexandra	Crewe Alexandra total		92	12	6	1	4	0	7	2	109	15
Witton Albion (loan)	2017–18	Northern Premier League	25	5	-	-	-	-	-	-	25	5
Altrincham (loan)	2018–19	Conference North	12	3	3	0	-	-	-	-	15	3
Blackpool (loan)	2021–22	Championship	7	1	0	0	0	0	0	0	7	1
Blackpool	2021–22	Championship	8	1	0	0	0	0	0	0	8	1
Blackpool	2023–24	Championship	23	2	4	1	1	0	4	1	32	4
Blackpool	Blackpool total		31	3	4	1	1	0	4	1	40	5
Portsmouth (loan)	2022–23	League One	43	2	1	0	2	0	4	0	50	2
Oxford United	2023–24	League One	15	1	0	0	0	0	3 (Note: Appearances in League One playoffs)	0	18	1
Oxford United	2024–25	Championship	11	0	0	0	1	0	0	0	12	0
Oxford United	Oxford total		26	1	0	0	1	0	3	0	30	1
Wigan Athletic (loan)	2024–25	League One	17	1	1	0	0	0	0	0	18	1
Plymouth Argyle (loan)	2025–26	League One	28	1	1	0	0	0	3	0	32	1
Northampton Town	2026–27	League Two	9	0	0	0	0	0	1	0	10	0
Career total			290	29	16	2	8	0	22	3	336	34

== Honours ==
Crewe Alexandra

- EFL League Two second-place promotion: 2019–20

Oxford United

- EFL League One play-offs: 2024

Individual

- Crewe Alexandra Player of the Year: 2020–21
- EFL League One Player of the Month: December 2020

== Personal life ==
Dale is in a relationship with Jessica Beaumont, who he met while at Crewe Alexandra. They have a son (Xavier) and daughter (Etta).
