= Rio Adebisi =

English footballer (born 2000)

Personal information
- Full name: Rio Adesola Frederick Adebisi
- Date of birth: 27 September 2000 (age 26)
- Place of birth: Croydon, England
- Height: 5 ft 9 in (1.75 m)
- Position: Defender

Team information
- Current team: Peterborough United

Youth career
- –2019: Crewe Alexandra

Senior career*
Years	Team	Apps	(Gls)
2019–2024	Crewe Alexandra	117	(6)
2019	→ Leek Town (loan)	5	(1)
2024–	Peterborough United	1	(0)
- * Club domestic league appearances and goals as of 20:51, 28 December 2024 (UTC)

Rio Adesola Frederick Adebisi (born 27 September 2000) is an English professional footballer who plays as a defender for EFL League One side Peterborough United.

== Early life ==
Adebisi was born in Croydon, and is of Nigerian descent; his family moved to Northwich, Cheshire in 2004. He joined Northwich side Barnton, playing mainly as an attacking box-to-box midfielder.

== Club career ==
=== Crewe Alexandra ===
He joined Crewe Alexandra's Academy aged 12, progressing through the ranks to play under-23 games in 2018-19; he also went on loan to Leek Town. He made his first team debut, aged 18, at Gresty Road in an EFL Cup second round tie against Aston Villa on 27 August 2019, and made his league debut, coming on as a 79th-minute substitute for Harry Pickering, against Scunthorpe United at Gresty Road on 29 December 2019.

A foot injury limited his appearances during the remainder of the 2019-20 season, but he was offered a new contract in June 2020, and signed a new two-year deal at the end of July 2020. In October 2021, he signed a new contract through to 2024. In December 2022, Adebisi suffered another foot injury in a 2–1 win at Morecambe; this did not respond to treatment, and in March 2022 he required an operation that sidelined him for four months.

He returned to the first team in September 2022, and on 25 October 2022 scored his first Crewe goal, the equaliser in a 1–1 draw at AFC Wimbledon. He scored in Crewe's last league game of the 2022–2023 season (a 2–2 draw at Newport County on 8 May 2023), then started the following season with goals in both of Crewe's opening league games, both also 2–2 draws, against Mansfield Town and Swindon Town respectively. After helping the club reach the League 2 play-off final in May 2024, Adebisi was offered a new contract by Crewe.

=== Peterborough United ===
On 3 July 2024, Adebisi signed for EFL League One side Peterborough United on a three-year deal for an undisclosed fee. He made his Peterborough debut on 20 December 2024, coming on as a 78th minute substitute in the side's 2–1 defeat at Stockport County, but a knee ligament injury ruled him out for the rest of the season.

== Career statistics ==
As of 28 December 2024.

Appearances and goals by club, season and competition
Club	Season	League			FA Cup		League Cup		Other		Total	
Club	Season	Division	Apps	Goals	Apps	Goals	Apps	Goals	Apps	Goals	Apps	Goals
Leek Town (loan)	2018–19	NPL Division One West	5	1	—		—		2 (Note: Appearances in Northern Premier League Division One West play-offs)	0	7	1
Crewe Alexandra	2019–20	League Two	2	0	0	0	1	0	2 (Note: Appearances in EFL Trophy)	0	5	0
Crewe Alexandra	2020–21	League One	15	0	0	0	0	0	2	0	17	0
Crewe Alexandra	2021–22	League One	22	0	1	0	1	0	0	0	24	0
Crewe Alexandra	2022–23	League Two	32	2	2	0	0	0	2	0	36	2
Crewe Alexandra	2023–24	League Two	46	4	3	0	2	0	3 (Note: Appearances in EFL League 2 play-offs)	0	54	4
Crewe Alexandra	Crewe total		117	6	6	0	4	0	9	0	136	6
Peterborough United	2024–25	League One	1	0	0	0	0	0	0	0	1	0
Career total			123	7	6	0	4	0	11	0	144	7
