= Harry Pickering (footballer) =

English footballer (born 1998)

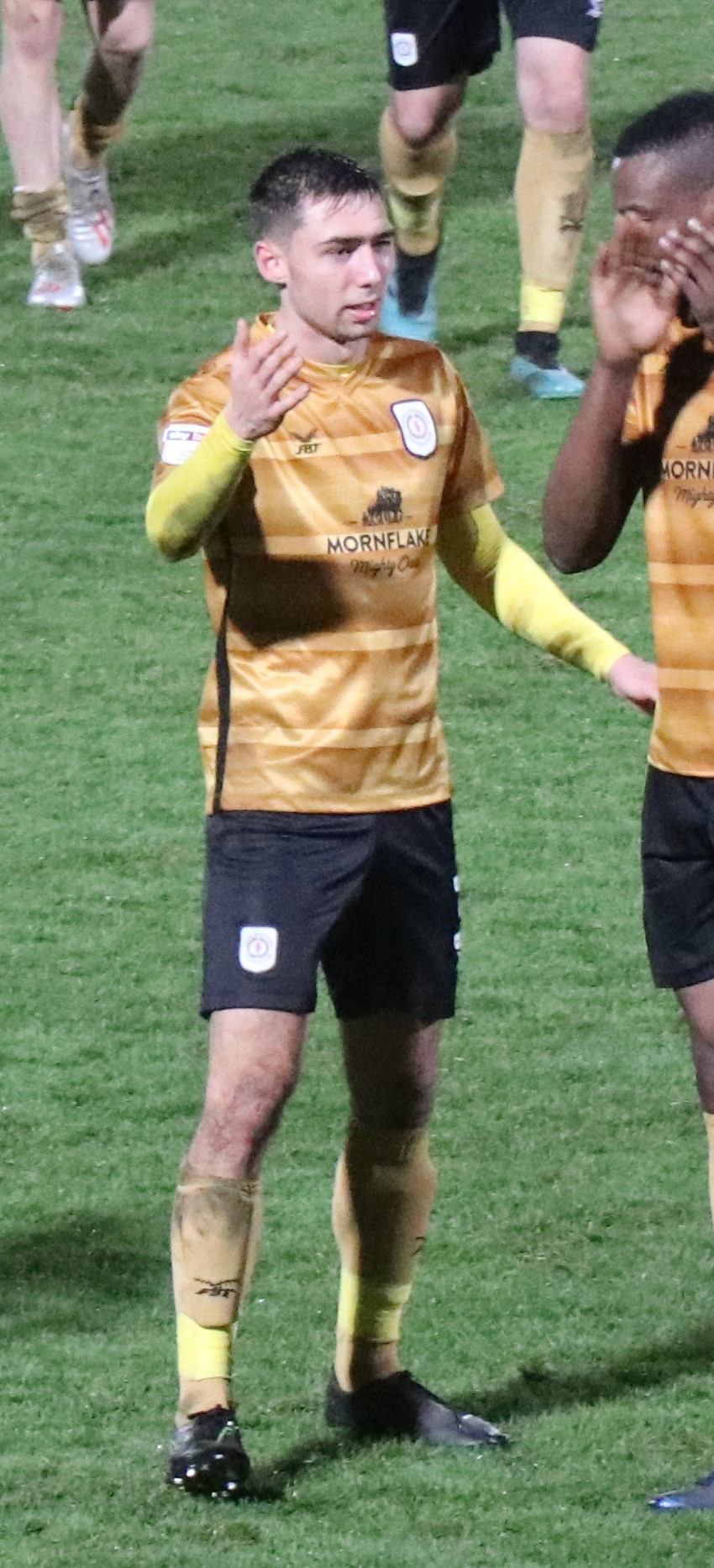
- Pickering in December 2019

Personal information
- Full name: Harry Leslie Pickering
- Date of birth: 29 December 1998 (age 27)
- Place of birth: Chester, England
- Height: 1.73 m (5 ft 8 in)
- Position: Left-back

Team information
- Current team: Blackburn Rovers
- Number: 3

Youth career
- –2016: Crewe Alexandra

Senior career*
Years	Team	Apps	(Gls)
2016–2021	Crewe Alexandra	127	(9)
2021–	Blackburn Rovers	146	(4)
2021	→ Crewe Alexandra (loan)	20	(0)
- * Club domestic league appearances and goals as of 16:47, 24 October 2026 (UTC)

Harry Leslie Pickering (born 29 December 1998) is an English professional footballer who plays as a defender for EFL Championship club Blackburn Rovers.

== Career ==
=== Crewe Alexandra ===
A graduate of Crewe Alexandra's Academy, Pickering signed professional terms with Crewe in March 2016. He made his debut on 22 April 2017, coming on as a 63rd-minute substitute for Callum Ainley against Leyton Orient at Gresty Road. Pickering scored his first senior goal on 24 February 2018 with an equaliser from a direct free kick away at Lincoln City in a game Crewe eventually won 4–1.

In April 2018, Pickering signed a new three-year contract at Crewe, with the option of a further year. At Colchester United on 21 August 2018, Pickering sustained a hamstring injury ruling him out of action for over a month.

In September 2020, Pickering signed a new three-year contract with the club, and in December 2020 was named Crewe captain in the absence of Perry Ng (Ng moved to Cardiff City the following month). Crewe rejected an initial offer from Blackburn Rovers during the January 2021 transfer window, but later agreed his move to Blackburn on a four-and-a-half-year deal (to summer 2025) for an undisclosed fee, with Pickering remaining at Crewe on loan (and remaining club captain) until the end of the 2020–21 season.

=== Blackburn Rovers ===
Pickering made his Rovers debut at Ewood Park in a 2–1 win over Swansea City on 7 August 2021. He scored his first goal for Blackburn just over a month later in a 2–2 league draw against Luton Town at Ewood Park on 11 September 2021. After a run of strong defensive performances, Pickering suffered a hamstring injury on 2 January 2022 in Blackburn's game against Huddersfield Town which ruled him out of first team action for several weeks.

On 19 August 2023, Pickering received his first career red card after bringing down Hull City's Liam Delap in the 16th minute of Blackburn's 2–1 home defeat at Ewood Park. In December 2023, shortly before his 100th game for Blackburn, he signed a contract extension committing himself to the club until 2027. In January 2024, Pickering suffered a hamstring injury ruling him out for around six weeks.

== Career statistics ==
As of match played 24 October 2026

Appearances and goals by club, season and competition
Club	Season	League			FA Cup		League Cup		Other		Total	
Club	Season	Division	Apps	Goals	Apps	Goals	Apps	Goals	Apps	Goals	Apps	Goals
Crewe Alexandra	2016–17	League Two	1	0	0	0	0	0	0	0	1	0
Crewe Alexandra	2017–18	League Two	35	3	3	0	1	0	1 (Note: Appearances in EFL Trophy)	0	40	3
Crewe Alexandra	2018–19	League Two	32	0	1	0	1	0	1	0	35	0
Crewe Alexandra	2019–20	League Two	35	3	4	0	1	0	3	0	43	3
Crewe Alexandra	2020–21	League One	24	3	2	0	1	0	2	1	29	4
Crewe Alexandra	Total		127	9	10	0	4	0	7	1	148	10
Blackburn Rovers	2020–21	Championship	0	0	–		–		–		0	0
Blackburn Rovers	2021–22	Championship	32	2	0	0	1	0	–		33	2
Blackburn Rovers	2022–23	Championship	40	1	5	0	1	0	–		46	1
Blackburn Rovers	2023–24	Championship	36	1	1	0	4	0	–		41	1
Blackburn Rovers	2024–25	Championship	15	0	0	0	2	0	–		17	0
Blackburn Rovers	2025–26	Championship	15	0	0	0	1	0	–		16	0
Blackburn Rovers	2026–27	Championship	8	0	0	0	2	0	–		10	0
Blackburn Rovers	Total		146	4	6	0	11	0	0	0	163	4
Crewe Alexandra (loan)	2020–21	League One	20	0	–		–		–		20	0
Total			293	13	16	0	15	0	7	1	331	14
