= Will Jääskeläinen =

Finnish footballer (born 1998)

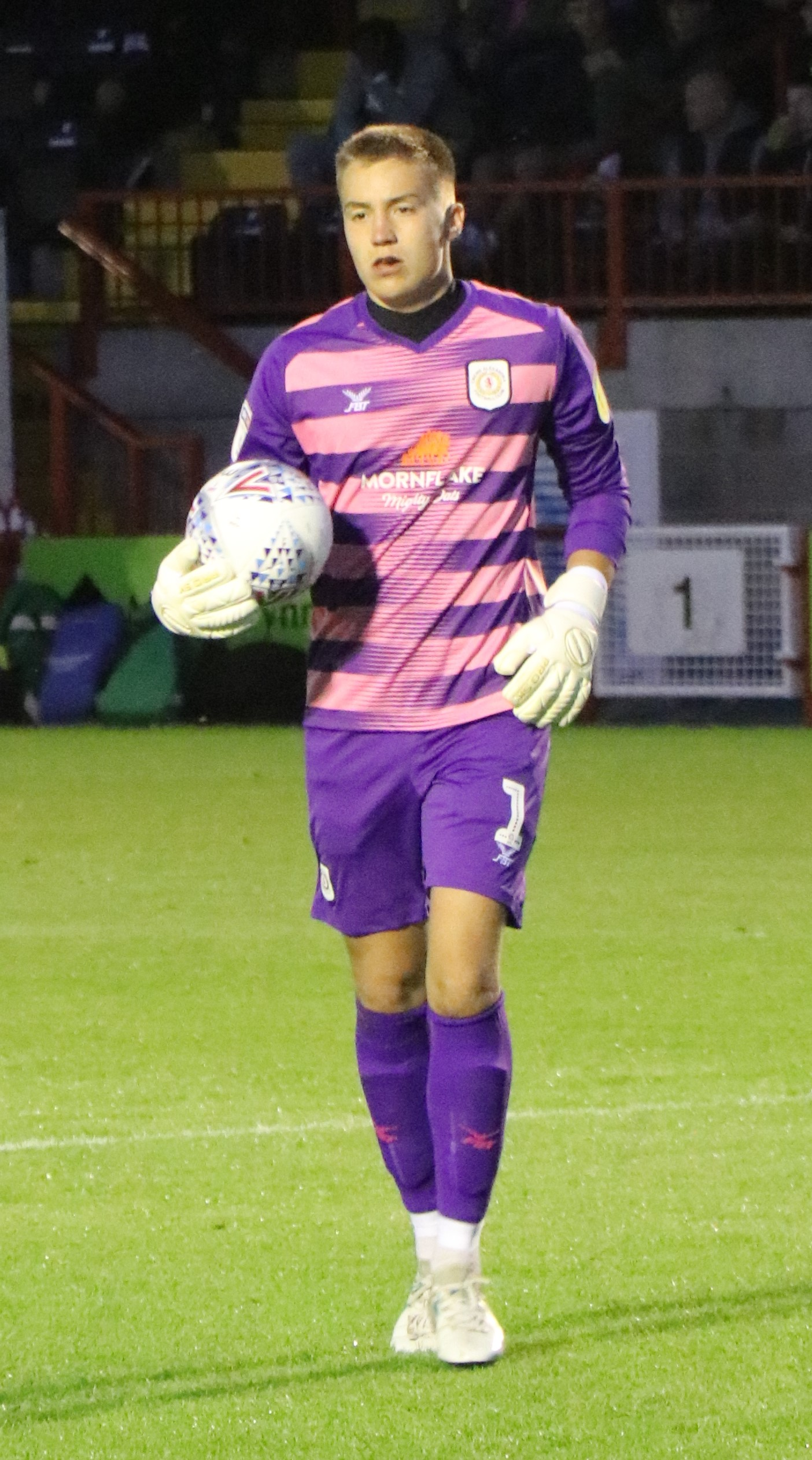
- Jääskeläinen playing for Crewe Alexandra at Crawley Town

Personal information
- Full name: William Albert Jääskeläinen
- Date of birth: 25 July 1998 (age 28)
- Place of birth: Bolton, England
- Height: 1.83 m (6 ft 0 in)
- Position: Goalkeeper

Team information
- Current team: Woking
- Number: 22

Youth career
- Bromley Cross Sharks
- 2015–2017: Bolton Wanderers

Senior career*
Years	Team	Apps	(Gls)
2017	Leek Town	0	(0)
2017–2022	Crewe Alexandra	84	(0)
2017	→ Loughborough Dynamo (loan)	8	(0)
2017	→ Nantwich Town (loan)	5	(0)
2018	→ Buxton (loan)	3	(0)
2018	→ Chester (loan)	0	(0)
2018	→ Nantwich Town (loan)	7	(0)
2018–2019	→ Nantwich Town (loan)	16	(0)
2022–2023	AFC Wimbledon	0	(0)
2023–	Woking	136	(0)

International career^{‡}
2015	Finland U18		
- Finland U19
- Finland U21
- * Club domestic league appearances and goals as of 19:03, 25 October 2026 (UTC) ‡ National team caps and goals as of 09:57, 11 September 2019 (UTC)

William Albert Jääskeläinen (born 25 July 1998) is a professional footballer who plays as a goalkeeper for National League club Woking. Born in England, he has represented Finland at youth international level.

== Club career ==
=== Bolton Wanderers ===
Prior to joining the Bolton Wanderers academy, Jääskeläinen started out at Bromley Cross Sharks. He turned professional with Bolton Wanderers at the start of the 2015–16 season. Shortly after, Jääskeläinen was given a number fifty shirt.

After being released by the club, he had a trial in August 2017 at VPS in his father's native Finland. On 24 July he signed for Leek Town.

=== Crewe Alexandra ===
A month later, he signed for Crewe Alexandra.

During the 2017–18 season, Jääskeläinen went on loan to Loughborough Dynamo, Nantwich Town, Buxton, and Chester.

Jääskeläinen signed a new three-year contract with Crewe in May 2018, but spent much of the 2018–19 season on loan again at Nantwich Town, though a loan extension to the end of the season was cut short when Crewe recalled him on 20 March 2019.

He made his first team debut for Crewe Alexandra on 19 April 2019, keeping a clean sheet, in a 2–0 win over Yeovil Town at Gresty Road. In June 2020, Jääskeläinen signed a new two-year deal with Crewe. Following relegation to League Two, Jääskeläinen was released by the club at the end of the 2021–22 season. Both the club and Jääskeläinen felt that he needed a "fresh challenge".

=== AFC Wimbledon ===
He signed for AFC Wimbledon in September 2022, on a one-month contract, as cover for the injured Nathan Broome. He made his debut for the club in the EFL Trophy victory over Crawley Town and then extended his contract until January 2023. He was released upon the expiry of his contract on 13 January 2023.

=== Woking ===
On 4 February 2023, Jääskeläinen signed for National League club Woking. After 14 appearances for the Cardinals, he was offered a new contract in May 2023, signing a one-year deal.

== International career ==
Jääskeläinen is eligible to play for England, his birthplace, and Finland, through his parents.

Jääskeläinen made his debut in international football on 25 August 2015 at the age 17 when he was called to represent Finland under-18s in a match against Montenegro under-18s.

Jääskeläinen has also represented Finland at under-19 youth level. In August 2019, he was called up by Finland Under-21s for two UEFA Euro U21 qualifiers. He was called up again by the under-21s in November 2019.

== Personal life ==
Jääskeläinen is the son of former Bolton Wanderers and Finland goalkeeper Jussi Jääskeläinen, the oldest of three brothers. His younger brother Emil signed his first professional contract with Blackpool in 2019. Jääskeläinen was educated at Bolton School Boys' Division. Growing up, Jaaskelainen and his brothers were raised bilingually, speaking Finnish at home and English with their friends.

== Career statistics ==
As of match played 24 October 2026.

Appearances and goals by club, season and competition
Club	Season	League			FA Cup		EFL Cup		Other		Total	
Club	Season	Division	Apps	Goals	Apps	Goals	Apps	Goals	Apps	Goals	Apps	Goals
Crewe Alexandra	2018–19	League Two	4	0	0	0	0	0	0	0	4	0
Crewe Alexandra	2019–20	League Two	35	0	4	0	0	0	0	0	39	0
Crewe Alexandra	2020–21	League One	31	0	2	0	0	0	0	0	33	0
Crewe Alexandra	2021–22	League One	15	0	0	0	2	0	3 (Note: Appearance(s) in EFL Trophy)	0	20	0
Crewe Alexandra	Total		85	0	6	0	2	0	3	0	96	0
Loughborough Dynamo (loan)	2017–18	Northern Premier League; Division One South	8	0	0	0	—		1 (Note: Appearance(s) in FA Trophy)	0	9	0
Nantwich Town (loan)	2017–18	Northern Premier League; Premier Division	5	0	3	0	—		2 (Note: One appearance in FA Trophy; one appearance in Northern Premier League Challenge Cup)	0	10	0
Buxton (loan)	2017–18	Northern Premier League; Premier Division	3	0	0	0	—		0	0	3	0
Chester (loan)	2017–18	National League	0	0	0	0	—		0	0	0	0
Nantwich Town (loan)	2018–19	Northern Premier League; Premier Division	23	0	1	0	—		2 (Note: Appearances in Cheshire Senior Cup)	0	26	0
AFC Wimbledon	2022–23	League Two	0	0	0	0	0	0	1	0	1	0
Woking	2022–23	National League	13	0	—		—		1 (Note: Appearance in National League play-offs)	0	14	0
Woking	2023–24	National League	30	0	3	0	—		1	0	34	0
Woking	2024–25	National League	43	0	2	0	—		6 (Note: Five appearances in FA Trophy; One Appearance in National League Cup)	0	51	0
Woking	2025–26	National League	34	0	2	0	—		2 (Note: One appearance in FA Trophy, one appearance in National League Cup)	0	38	0
Woking	2026–27	National League	14	0	1	0	—		0	0	15	0
Woking	Total		136	0	8	0	—		10	0	154	0
Career total			256	0	18	0	2	0	19	0	293	0

== Honours ==
Crewe Alexandra

- EFL League Two runner-up: 2019–20

Individual

- Crewe Alexandra Breakthrough Player of the Year: 2019–20
