= Billy Sass-Davies =

Welsh footballer (born 2000)

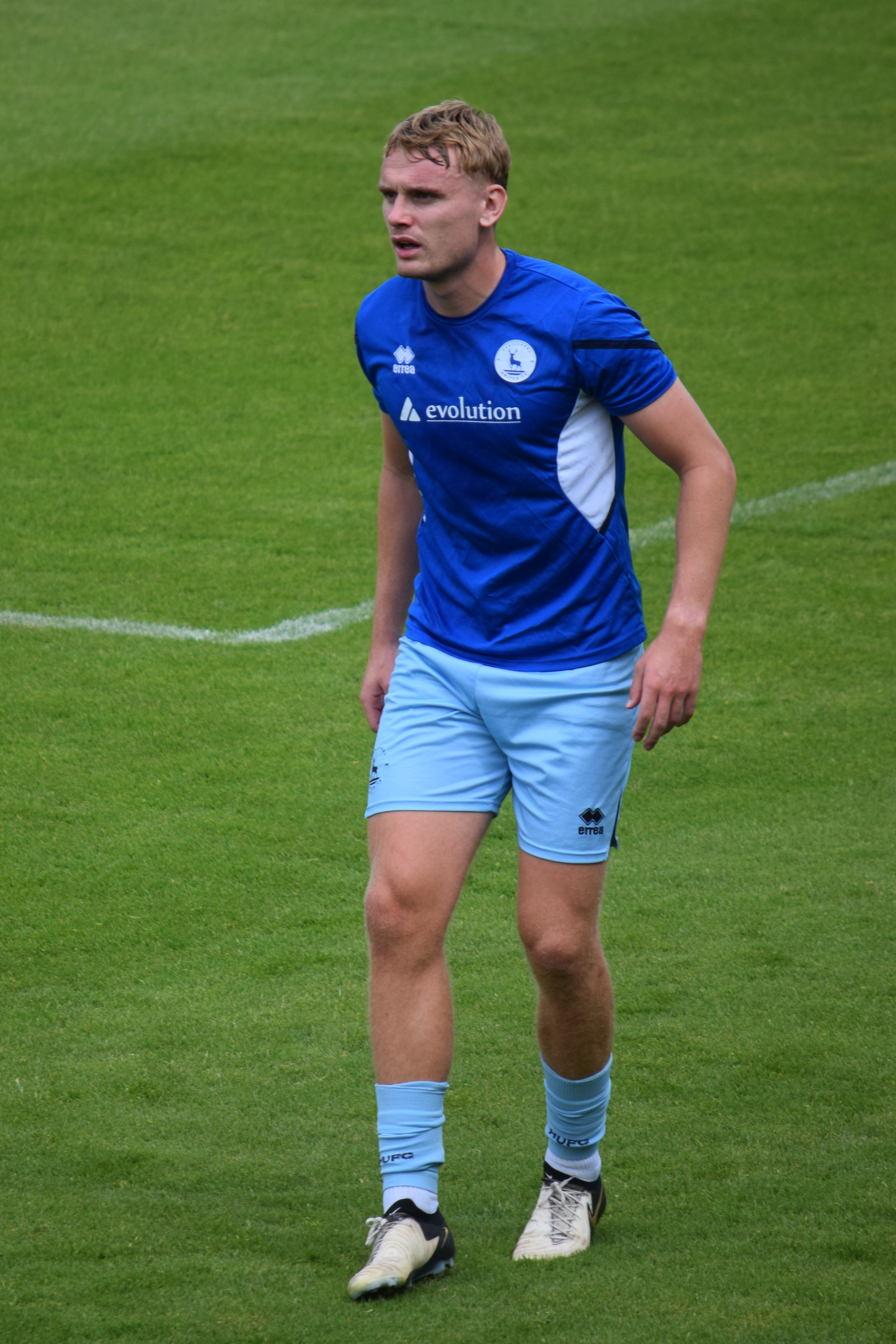
- Sass-Davies warming up for Hartlepool United in 2024

Personal information
- Full name: William John Sass-Davies
- Date of birth: 17 February 2000 (age 26)
- Place of birth: Abergele, Wales
- Height: 1.93 m (6 ft 4 in)
- Position: Defender

Team information
- Current team: Altrincham
- Number: 15

Youth career
- –2017: Crewe Alexandra

Senior career*
Years	Team	Apps	(Gls)
2017–2024	Crewe Alexandra	35	(0)
2018	→ Colwyn Bay (loan)	8	(0)
2018–2019	→ Leek Town (loan)	10	(1)
2019	→ FC United of Manchester (loan)	8	(0)
2019	→ Altrincham (loan)	2	(0)
2019	→ AFC Telford United (loan)	6	(1)
2020	→ Ashton United (loan)	5	(1)
2020	→ Altrincham (loan)	7	(0)
2021	→ Yeovil Town (loan)	22	(1)
2023	→ Woking (loan)	7	(0)
2023–2024	→ Boreham Wood (loan)	36	(4)
2024–2025	Hartlepool United	24	(0)
2025–2026	Altrincham	0	(0)

International career^{‡}
2017–2018	Wales U19	4	(0)
2021	Wales U21	8	(1)
- * Club domestic league appearances and goals as of 11:04, 4 June 2025 (UTC) ‡ National team caps and goals as of 18:27, 16 November 2021 (UTC)

William John Sass-Davies (born 17 February 2000) is a Welsh professional footballer who plays as a central defender for National League club Altrincham. He has also represented Wales at under-19 and under-21 levels.

== Club career ==
=== Crewe Alexandra ===
Sass-Davies signed professional terms with Crewe Alexandra in July 2017. After being on the substitutes bench for the opening five games of the 2017–18 season, he made his first-team debut, aged 17, on 29 August 2017, being named in the starting line-up in an EFL Trophy group stage game against Newcastle United U21s at Gresty Road.

In February 2018 he joined Colwyn Bay on loan.

He joined Northern Premier League side Leek Town on loan in November 2018.

In January 2019 he joined FC United of Manchester on loan making his debut, and being voted man of the match, the next day in a victory in a league match against Bradford Park Avenue. In March 2019, he joined Altrincham on loan and made one appearance, as a second-half substitute, in a 1–0 win at York City. On 19 April 2019, Sass-Davies made his first league start for Crewe, playing in a 2–0 win over Yeovil Town at Gresty Road.

He was offered a new contract by Crewe at the end of the 2018–19 season. During the 2019–20 season, Sass-Davies had a loan spell at AFC Telford United, and in February 2020 went on a month's loan to Northern Premier League side Ashton United, making his debut against Witton Albion on 8 February 2020.

Sass-Davies scored his first professional goal, for Crewe, in a 2–1 defeat to Lincoln City in the first round of the EFL Cup at Gresty Road on 5 September 2020.

On 7 November 2020, he rejoined Altrincham on loan for a month. He made seven league appearances during his second loan spell at the club. On 3 December 2020, Sass-Davies was recalled by Crewe Alexandra following injuries to several first-team players.

On 9 February 2021, Sass-Davies joined National League side Yeovil Town on a one-month loan deal, making his debut in a 1–0 defeat at Eastleigh later the same day. He scored his first league goal for Yeovil in their 4–1 win at Barnet on 2 March 2021. The loan was then extended for a further month, and eventually continued until the end of Yeovil's season in late May. Meanwhile, on 13 May 2021, Crewe announced that it had triggered a contract extension.

Sass-Davies was sent off after 13 minutes of Crewe's second game of the 2021–22 season, an EFL Cup first round tie at Hartlepool United on 10 August 2021. He made his next appearance in the EFL Cup second round tie at Premier League Leeds United, where Crewe conceded three late goals to lose 3–0, but did not make a league appearance for Crewe (his first in three seasons) until 25 September 2021 in a 1–1 draw at Rotherham United. On 6 January 2022, the club announced Sass-Davies had signed an extended deal through to 2024. In February 2022, he suffered a blood clot in his calf ruling him out for the remainder of the season.

On 4 March 2023, Sass-Davies joined National League side Woking on a 28-day loan deal, making his debut as a late substitute in Woking's 1–0 win at Yeovil Town on the same day.

Sass-Davies was made available for transfer by Crewe at the end of the 2022–23 season. On 1 September 2023, he and teammate Regan Griffiths joined National League side Boreham Wood on loan deals running to 31 January 2024. He made his debut on 2 September 2023, in a 1–0 home defeat by Barnet, coming on as a half-time substitute for Kwesi Appiah. On his seventh appearance for Boreham Wood, Sass-Davies was sent off at Ebbsfleet United. He scored his first Boreham Wood goal on 24 October 2023, helping his side to a 3–1 league win at Dagenham & Redbridge. On 29 January 2024, Sass-Davies's loan deal at Boreham Wood was extended to the end of the season. Sass-Davies was released by Crewe at the end of the 2023–24 season.

=== Hartlepool United ===
Following a successful trial, Sass-Davies signed for National League side Hartlepool United on 3 August 2024. In May 2025, he chose to leave the club for family reasons.

=== Return to Altrincham ===
In June 2025, Sass-Davies returned to National League side Altrincham on a permanent basis after two previous loan spells with the club. After an injury-hit season, in which he only made the substitutes bench once, he was released by Altrincham at the end of the 2025–2026 season.

== International career ==
He was called up by the Wales national under-19 football team in September 2017 to play against Iceland, starting four matches, including a UEFA European Under-19 Championship qualifier against Kazakhstan on 13 November 2017.

In March 2021, Sass-Davies was called up to the Wales national under-21 football team for the first time, playing all 90 minutes in Wales's 2–1 defeat by Ireland at Colliers Park, Wrexham on 26 March 2021. Manager Paul Bodin then selected a largely unchanged squad, including Sass-Davies, for the side's Euro 2023 qualifying game against Moldova on 4 June 2021; Sass-Davies played the whole goal-less draw at Stebonheath Park, Llanelli. In August 2021, Sass-Davies was called up for the under-21 side to play against Bulgaria in Sofia on 7 September 2021, and scored the second goal in Wales's 4–0 victory. He was then called up for under-21 matches against Moldova and the Netherlands on 8 and 12 October 2021 respectively, earning two further caps, and for under-21 matches against Gibraltar and Switzerland a month later.

== Career statistics ==
As of match played 21 April 2025

Appearances and goals by club, season and competition
Club	Season	League			FA Cup		EFL Cup		Other		Total	
Club	Season	Division	Apps	Goals	Apps	Goals	Apps	Goals	Apps	Goals	Apps	Goals
Crewe Alexandra	2017–18	League Two	0	0	0	0	0	0	1 (Note: Appearance(s) in EFL Trophy)	0	1	0
Crewe Alexandra	2018–19	League Two	2	0	0	0	0	0	0	0	2	0
Crewe Alexandra	2019–20	League Two	0	0	0	0	1	0	0	0	1	0
Crewe Alexandra	2020–21	League One	0	0	0	0	1	1	3	0	4	1
Crewe Alexandra	2021–22	League One	22	0	1	0	2	0	0	0	25	0
Crewe Alexandra	2022–23	League Two	11	0	2	0	0	0	2	0	15	0
Crewe Alexandra	2023–24	League Two	0	0	0	0	0	0	0	0	0	0
Crewe Alexandra	Total		35	0	3	0	4	1	6	0	48	1
Leek Town (loan)	2018–19	NPL Division One West	10	1	—		—		1 (Note: Appearance in Northern Premier League Challenge Cup)	0	11	1
FC United of Manchester (loan)	2018–19	National League North	8	0	—		—		—		8	0
Altrincham (loan)	2018–19	National League North	2	0	—		—		—		2	0
AFC Telford United (loan)	2019–20	National League North	6	1	—		—		—		6	1
Ashton United (loan)	2019–20	NPL Premier Division	5	1	—		—		—		5	1
Altrincham (loan)	2020–21	National League	7	0	—		—		—		7	0
Yeovil Town (loan)	2020–21	National League	22	1	—		—		—		22	1
Woking (loan)	2022–23	National League	7	0	—		—		—		7	0
Boreham Wood (loan)	2023–24	National League	36	4	1	0	—		—		37	4
Hartlepool United	2024–25	National League	24	0	2	0	—		1 (Note: Appearance(s) in FA Trophy)	0	27	0
Altrincham	2025–26	National League	0	0	0	0	—		0	0	0	0
Career total			162	8	6	0	4	1	8	0	180	9
