= 2020–21 Crewe Alexandra F.C. season =

Crewe Alexandra
2020–21 season
- Chairman: John Bowler
- Manager: David Artell
- Stadium: Alexandra Stadium
- League One: 12th
- FA Cup: Second round
- EFL Cup: First round
- EFL Trophy: Second round
- Top goalscorer: League: Mikael Mandron (11); All: Mikael Mandron (14)
Home colours	Away colours

The 2020–21 season was the 144th season in existence of Crewe Alexandra, their 97th in the English Football League and the first season back in EFL League One following a four-season absence. Along with League One, the club also participated in the FA Cup, EFL Cup and EFL Trophy.

The season covers the period from 1 July 2020 to 30 June 2021.

== Transfers ==
=== Transfers in ===
Date	Position	Nationality	Name	From	Fee	Ref.
1 July 2020	CF	(Republic of the Congo)	Offrande Zanzala	(England) Accrington Stanley	Free transfer	
1 August 2020	CF	(France)	Mikael Mandron	(England) Gillingham	Free transfer	
27 August 2020	CB	(Montserrat)	Donervon Daniels	(England) Luton Town	Free transfer	
4 September 2020	CB	(Grenada)	Omar Beckles	(England) Shrewsbury Town	Free transfer	
4 September 2020	CM	(England)	Luke Murphy	(England) Bolton Wanderers	Free transfer	

=== Loans in ===
Date	Position	Nationality	Name	From	Date until	Ref.
21 January 2021	RB	(England)	Billy Jones	(England) Rotherham United	End of season	
22 January 2021	SS	(England)	Stephen Walker	(England) Middlesbrough	End of season	
23 January 2021	AM	(England)	Antony Evans	(Germany) Paderborn	End of season	
1 February 2021	LB	(England)	Harry Pickering	(England) Blackburn Rovers	End of season	
1 February 2021	CB	(England)	Nathan Wood	(England) Middlesbrough	End of season	

=== Loans out ===
Date	Position	Nationality	Name	To	Date until	Ref.
7 October 2020	LM	(England)	Regan Griffiths	(England) Witton Albion	November 2020	
29 October 2020	MF	(England)	Joe Robbins	(England) Altrincham	December 2020	
6 November 2020	CB	(Wales)	Billy Sass-Davies	(England) Altrincham	3 December 2020	
1 February 2021	CB	(Republic of Ireland)	Eddie Nolan	(Scotland) Motherwell	End of season	
9 February 2021	CB	(Wales)	Billy Sass-Davies	(England) Yeovil Town	April 2021	
31 March 2021	CM	(England)	Regan Griffiths	(England) Notts County	End of season	

=== Transfers out ===
Date	Position	Nationality	Name	To	Fee	Ref.
1 July 2020	CM	(Republic of Ireland)	Paul Green	(England) Boston United	Released	
1 July 2020	CM	(England)	Connor Heath	(England) Nantwich Town	Released	
1 July 2020	CB	(England)	Nicky Hunt	(England) Darlington	Released	
1 July 2020	CF	(England)	Aaron Lomas	Unattached	Released	
1 July 2020	CF	(England)	Shaun Miller	(England) Bolton Wanderers	Released	
1 July 2020	CF	(England)	Lewis Reilly	(England) Chorley	Released	
6 July 2020	CM	(Scotland)	James Jones	(England) Lincoln City	Free transfer	
27 August 2020	GK	(South Africa)	Dino Visser	(England) Port Vale	Free transfer	
23 October 2020	CM	(England)	Ethan Hartshorn	(England) Kidsgrove Athletic	Free transfer	
2 January 2021	CF	(Republic of the Congo)	Offrande Zanzala	(England) Carlisle United	Mutual consent	
19 January 2021	RB	(England)	Perry Ng	(Wales) Cardiff City	Undisclosed	
1 February 2021	LB	(England)	Harry Pickering	(England) Blackburn Rovers	Undisclosed	
23 June 2021	MF	(England)	Ryan Wintle	(Wales) Cardiff City	Free transfer	

== Pre-season ==
Win	Draw	Loss

Date	Opponent	Venue	Result (Note: Crewe Alexandra's score shown first)	Ref.
4 August 2020	Connah's Quay Nomads	Home (Note: Match took place at Crewe's training ground in Worleston)	3–1	
8 August 2020	Bala Town	Home	4–0	
11 August 2020	Salford City	Away	4–1	
14 August 2020	Accrington Stanley U23		4–2	
15 August 2020	Walsall	Home	2–0	
19 August 2020	Witton Albion	Away	4–0	
19 August 2020	Nantwich Town	Away	2–4	
22 August 2020	Barnsley	Home	0–2	
25 August 2020	Newcastle United	Neutral	0–3	
26 August 2020	Wolverhampton Wanderers U23	Away	1–1	
28 August 2020	Bolton Wanderers	Away	3–0	
2 September 2020	Kidsgrove Athletic	Away	1–1	

== Competitions ==
=== EFL League One ===
==== League table ====
Pos	Team	Pld	W	D	L	GF	GA	GD	Pts
8	Portsmouth	46	21	9	16	65	51	+14	72
9	Ipswich Town	46	19	12	15	46	46	0	69
10	Gillingham	46	19	10	17	63	60	+3	67
11	Accrington Stanley	46	18	13	15	63	68	−5	67
12	Crewe Alexandra	46	18	12	16	56	61	−5	66
13	Milton Keynes Dons	46	18	11	17	64	62	+2	65
14	Doncaster Rovers	46	19	7	20	63	67	−4	64
15	Fleetwood Town	46	16	12	18	49	46	+3	60
16	Burton Albion	46	15	12	19	61	73	−12	57

Source: EFL Official Website
Rules for classification: 1) Points; 2) Goal difference; 3) Number of goals scored; 4) Head-to-head results; 5) Wins; 6) Away goals; 7) Penalty points (sec 9.5); 8) 12-point sending off offences

==== Results summary ====
Overall								Home						Away					
Pld	W	D	L	GF	GA	GD	Pts	W	D	L	GF	GA	GD	W	D	L	GF	GA	GD
46	18	12	16	56	61	−5	66	10	7	6	32	30	+2	8	5	10	24	31	−7

Last updated: 9 May 2021.
Source: BBC

==== Results by matchday ====
Matchday	1	2	3	4	5	6	7	8	9	10	11	12	13	14	15	16	17	18	19	20	21	22	23	24	25	26	27	28	29	30	31	32	33	34	35	36	37	38	39	40	41	42	43	44	45	46
Ground	H	A	H	H	H	A	A	H	A	A	H	A	A	A	H	A	H	H	A	H	A	A	H	H	A	H	A	A	A	H	H	A	A	H	H	A	H	A	H	H	A	A	H	A	A	H
Result	L	L	W	W	D	L	W	L	L	L	W	W	L	L	W	D	W	W	W	D	D	D	W	D	L	D	W	L	L	W	D	D	L	W	L	W	L	W	L	D	L	W	D	D	W	W
Position	20	22	14	13	13	14	13	15	15	18	13	12	13	14	13	13	11	11	9	9	9	10	7	8	9	10	9	9	14	11	11	11	13	12	13	14	15	14	15	15	15	14	15	14	14	12

Updated to match(es) played on 9 May 2021. Source: 11v11 for league tables and fixtures
A = Away; H = Home; W = Win; D = Draw; L = Loss

==== Matches ====
Win Draw Loss Postponed

The 2020–21 season fixtures were released on 21 August.

12 September 2020 1	Crewe Alexandra	0–2	Charlton Athletic	Crewe
15:00 GMT		Report	Doughty 24' (yellow card) 80'; Washington 43'; Amos (yellow card) 71'	Stadium: Alexandra Stadium; Attendance: 0 Referee: Graham Salisbury

19 September 2020 2	Hull City	1–0	Crewe Alexandra	Kingston upon Hull
15:00 GMT	de Wijs (yellow card) 55'; Smallwood (yellow card) 67'; Elder (yellow card) 72'; Wilks 81' (yellow card) 90'; Mayer (yellow card) 83'	Report	Pickering (yellow card) 70'	Stadium: KCOM Stadium; Attendance: 0 Referee: Ben Toner

26 September 2020 3	Crewe Alexandra	2–0	Milton Keynes Dons	Crewe
15:00 GMT	Mandron 13'; Finney 20' (yellow card) 56'	Report	Gladwin (yellow card) 37'; Houghton (yellow card) 57'; Fraser (yellow card) 65'; Morris (yellow card) 90+4'	Stadium: Alexandra Stadium; Attendance: 0 Referee: Sebastian Stockbridge

10 October 2020 4	Crewe Alexandra	3–0	Wigan Athletic	Crewe
15:00 GMT	Offord 27'; Pickering 40'; Mandron 59'; Wintle (yellow card) 61'	Report		Stadium: Alexandra Stadium; Attendance: 0 Referee: Martin Coy

17 October 2020 5	Crewe Alexandra	1–1	Blackpool	Crewe
15:00 GMT	Mandron 54'; Murphy (yellow card) 78'; Beckles (yellow card) 83'	Report	Turton (yellow card) 45'; Yates (yellow card) 69'; Ward 71'	Stadium: Alexandra Stadium; Attendance: 0 Referee: Peter Wright

20 October 2020 6	Sunderland	1–0	Crewe Alexandra	Sunderland
19:00 GMT	Wyke 45+1'	Report	Jääskeläinen (yellow card) 66'; Ng (yellow card) 71'; Wintle (yellow card) 90+1'	Stadium: Stadium of Light; Attendance: 0 Referee: Neil Hair

24 October 2020 7	Doncaster Rovers	1–2	Crewe Alexandra	Doncaster
15:00 GMT	Sims 27'; Halliday (yellow card) 64'	Report	Kirk 26'; Pickering 70'	Stadium: Keepmoat Stadium; Attendance: 0 Referee: Craig Hicks

27 October 2020 8	Crewe Alexandra	0–1	Lincoln City	Crewe
19:00 GMT	Murphy (yellow card) 39'	Report	Anderson 39'	Stadium: Alexandra Stadium; Attendance: 0 Referee: Ben Speedie

31 October 2020 9	Ipswich Town	1–0	Crewe Alexandra	Ipswich
15:00 GMT	Dozzell (yellow card) 55'; Hawkins 62'; Judge (yellow card) 66'; Jackson (yellow card) 86'; Edwards (yellow card) 88'	Report	Mandron (yellow card) 63'	Stadium: Portman Road; Attendance: 0 Referee: Trevor Kettle

3 November 2020 10	Crewe Alexandra	0–1	Gillingham	Crewe
19:00 GMT	Offord (yellow card) 12'; Ng (yellow card) 76'; Mandron (yellow card) 83'	Report	Akinde 58'	Stadium: Alexandra Stadium; Attendance: 0 Referee: Kevin Johnson

14 November 2020 11	Crewe Alexandra	2–0	Peterborough United	Crewe
15:00 GMT	Pickering 29'; Kirk 41'	Report		Stadium: Alexandra Stadium; Attendance: 0 Referee: Christopher Pollard

17 November 2020 12	Oxford United	0–2	Crewe Alexandra	Oxford
19:00 GMT	Shodipo (yellow card) 67'; Clare (yellow card) 78'; Rodríguez (yellow card) 90'	Report	Mandron 28'; Offord (yellow card) 68'; Dale (yellow card) 79' (goal) 90+2'	Stadium: Kassam Stadium; Attendance: 0 Referee: Will Finnie

21 November 2020 13	Portsmouth	4–1	Crewe Alexandra	Milton
15:00 GMT	Cannon (yellow card) 15'; Curtis 15', 40'; Naylor 51'; Marquis 56'; Harrison (yellow card) 85'	Report	Ng (yellow card) 57'; Finney 90+4' (pen.)	Stadium: Fratton Park; Attendance: 0 Referee: James Oldham

24 November 2020 14	Accrington Stanley	1–0	Crewe Alexandra	Accrington
19:00 GMT	Russell (yellow card) 35'; Bishop 59'	Report	Pickering (yellow card) 58'; Dale (yellow card) 62'	Stadium: Wham Stadium; Attendance: 0 Referee: Anthony Backhouse

1 December 2020 15	Crewe Alexandra	4–2	Swindon Town	Crewe
19:00 GMT	Powell 39'; Ng 54'; Lowery 62'; Dale 66'	Report	Grant 20'; Smith 37'; Broadbent (yellow card) 68'	Stadium: Alexandra Stadium; Attendance: 0 Referee: Sam Barrott

5 December 2020 16	Burton Albion	1–1	Crewe Alexandra	Burton upon Trent
15:00 GMT	Bostwick (yellow card) 52'; Hughes (yellow card) 71' (goal) 76'; Powell (yellow card) 90+3'	Report	Johnson (yellow card) 60'; Dale 88'	Stadium: Pirelli Stadium; Attendance: 0 Referee: Andy Haines

12 December 2020 17	Crewe Alexandra	2–1	Northampton Town	Crewe
15:00 GMT	Dale 53'; Pickering (yellow card) 83'; Wintle 90+4'	Report	Holmes 3'; Bolger (yellow card) 15'; Martin (yellow card) 26' (yellow-red card) 70'	Stadium: Gresty Road; Attendance: 2,000; Referee: John Busby

15 December 2020 18	Crewe Alexandra	2–1	Plymouth Argyle	Crewe
19:00 GMT	Kirk 22'; Dale 43'	Report	Fornah (yellow card) 17'; Jephcott 85'	Stadium: Alexandra Stadium; Attendance: 2,000; Referee: Scott Oldham

19 December 2020 19	AFC Wimbledon	1–2	Crewe Alexandra	Wimbledon
15:00 GMT	Woodyard (yellow card) 31'; Reilly (yellow card) 45+1'; Longman 90'	Report	Mandron 60'; Jääskeläinen (yellow card) 83'; Beckles (yellow card) 87'; Finney 90+1'	Stadium: Plough Lane; Attendance: 0 Referee: James Linington

26 December 2020 20	Crewe Alexandra	1–1	Fleetwood Town	Crewe
15:00 GMT	Beckles (yellow card) 16'; Dale (yellow card) 23'; Offord (yellow card) 42'; Mandron 61'	Report	Andrew (yellow card) 38'; Burns 49'; Rossiter (yellow card) 60'; Madden (yellow card) 77' Barton (yellow card)	Stadium: Alexandra Stadium; Attendance: 0 Referee: Tom Nield

9 January 2021 21	Rochdale	3–3	Crewe Alexandra	Rochdale
15:00 GMT	Lund (yellow card) 41', (goal) 60', 84'; Morley 47'	Report	Finney 6', 35'; Dale 23'	Stadium: Spotland; Attendance: 0 Referee: Ross Joyce

16 January 2021 22	Plymouth Argyle	1–1	Crewe Alexandra	Plymouth
15:00 GMT	Jephcott 11' (pen.); Watts (yellow card) 26'; Edwards (yellow card) 58'; Opoku (yellow card) 60'; Mayor (yellow card) 74'; Camará (yellow card) 78' (yellow-red card) 90+3'	Report	Finney 64'; Offord (yellow card) 80'	Stadium: Home Park; Attendance: 0 Referee: Charles Breakspear

19 January 2021 23	Crewe Alexandra	3–2	Bristol Rovers	Crewe
19:00 GMT	Kirk 4'; Wintle 23'; Finney (yellow card) 31'; Offord (yellow card) 45'; Lancashire 55'; Johnson (yellow card) 86'	Report	McCormick (yellow card) 45+4' (goal) 51'; Ehmer 47'; Harries (yellow card) 58'	Stadium: Gresty Road; Attendance: 0 Referee: Martin Coy

23 January 2021 24	Crewe Alexandra	1–1	AFC Wimbledon	Crewe
15:00 GMT	Finney 31'	Report	Pigott 2'; McLoughlin (yellow card) 78'	Stadium: Alexandra Stadium; Attendance: 0 Referee: Kevin Johnson

26 January 2021 25	Gillingham	4–1	Crewe Alexandra	Gillingham
18:00 GMT	Graham 11' (pen.); Lee 38', 62'; Dempsey 45'; Oliver (yellow card) 46'; Cundy (yellow card) 67'; Akinde (yellow card) 90+3'	Report	Porter 80'; Johnson (yellow card) 90+4'	Stadium: Priestfield Stadium; Attendance: 0 Referee: Alan Young

30 January 2021 26	Crewe Alexandra	1–1	Ipswich Town	Crewe
15:00 GMT	Beckles (yellow card) 39'; Kirk 59', (yellow card) 73'	Report	Kenlock (yellow card) 33'; Sears (yellow card) 36'; Bishop (yellow card) 70' (yellow-red card) 82'; Drinan 75'	Stadium: Alexandra Stadium; Attendance: 0 Referee: Ross Joyce

2 February 2021 27	Shrewsbury Town	0–1	Crewe Alexandra	Shrewsbury
19:00 GMT	Whalley (yellow card) 38'; Chapman (yellow card) 76'	Report	Pickering (yellow card) 11'; Dale 27'; Beckles (yellow card) 74'; Lancashire (yellow card) 85'	Stadium: Montgomery Waters Meadow; Attendance: 0 Referee: Marc Edwards

6 February 2021 28	Peterborough United	2–0	Crewe Alexandra	Peterborough
15:00 GMT	Szmodics 25'; Clarke-Harris 31'; Taylor (yellow card) 33'; Kent (yellow card) 47'; Dembélé (yellow card) 63'	Report		Stadium: Weston Homes Stadium; Attendance: 0 Referee: Carl Boyeson

20 February 2021 29	Swindon Town	2–1	Crewe Alexandra	Swindon
15:00 GMT	Johnson 10' (o.g.); Thompson (yellow card) 84'; Twine 90+4'	Report	Lowery 5', (yellow card) 70'	Stadium: The County Ground; Attendance: 0 Referee: Ben Toner

23 February 2021 30	Crewe Alexandra	2–0	Accrington Stanley	Crewe
19:00 GMT	Beckles 32'; Lowery (yellow card) 45+1'; Porter 79'	Report	Rodgers (red card) 50'; Hughes (yellow card) 71'	Stadium: Alexandra Stadium; Attendance: 0 Referee: Brett Huxtable

27 February 2021 31	Crewe Alexandra	2–2	Sunderland	Crewe
15:00 GMT	Porter 30'; Lowery 38'	Report	McFadzean (yellow card) 36'; Jones 76'; Maguire 90+7'	Stadium: Alexandra Stadium; Attendance: 0 Referee: Chris Sarginson

2 March 2021 32	Blackpool	1–1	Crewe Alexandra	Blackpool
19:00 GMT	Ballard 41'; Lawrence-Gabriel (yellow card) 78'; Virtue (yellow card) 90+3'; Garbutt (yellow card) 90+3'	Report	Walker 86'	Stadium: Bloomfield Road; Attendance: 0 Referee: Seb Stockbridge

6 March 2021 33	Lincoln City	3–0	Crewe Alexandra	Lincoln
15:00 GMT	Rogers 21'; McGrandles 52'; Jackson (yellow card) 67'; Jones (yellow card) 79'; Johnson 80'	Report		Stadium: LNER Stadium; Attendance: 0 Referee: John Busby

9 March 2021 34	Crewe Alexandra	1–0	Doncaster Rovers	Crewe
19:00 GMT	Beckles (yellow card) 43'; Wintle (yellow card) 53'; Mandron 56'; Lowery (yellow card) 90+4'	Report	James (yellow card) 61'; Robertson (yellow card) 72'	Stadium: Gresty Road; Referee: Ben Speedie

13 March 2021 35	Crewe Alexandra	0–3	Burton Albion	Crewe
15:00 GMT		Report	Hemmings 9', 23', 34'; Taylor (yellow card) 76'; Carter (yellow card) 90+4'	Stadium: Alexandra Stadium; Attendance: 0 Referee: Graham Salisbury

20 March 2021 36	Northampton Town	0–1	Crewe Alexandra	Northampton
15:00 GMT	McWilliams (yellow card) 47'	Report	Murphy (yellow card) 45'; Beckles (yellow card) 45+2'; Dale 74'	Stadium: PTS Academy Stadium; Attendance: Behind Closed Doors; Referee: Sam Allison

2 April 2021 37	Crewe Alexandra	1–2	Hull City	Crewe
15:00 BST	Porter 66' (pen.); Kirk (yellow card) 84'	Report	Honeyman (yellow card) 63'; Lewis-Potter (yellow card) 65'; Magennis 71' (pen.); Docherty (yellow card) 73'; Wilks 90+1'	Stadium: Alexandra Stadium; Attendance: 0 Referee: Christopher Pollard

5 April 2021 38	Milton Keynes Dons	0–2	Crewe Alexandra	Denbigh
15:00 BST		Report	Mandron 15', 20'; Lancashire (yellow card) 77'; Wintle (yellow card) 90+5'	Stadium: Stadium:mk; Attendance: 0 Referee: Andy Woolmer

10 April 2021 39	Crewe Alexandra	0–6	Oxford United	Crewe
15:00 BST	Beckles (yellow card) 87'	Report	Ruffels 36'; Henry 40'; Moore 45+2'; Barker 47'; Brannagan (penalty missed) 50', 50'; Winnall 84'	Stadium: Alexandra Stadium; Attendance: 0 Referee: Paul Howard

13 April 2021 40	Crewe Alexandra	0–0	Portsmouth	Crewe
18:00 BST	Lowery (yellow card) 20'; Offord (yellow card) 45+4'	Report	Raggett (yellow card) 28'; Williams (yellow card) 49'; Marquis (penalty missed) 59'; Johnson (yellow card) 77'	Stadium: Alexandra Stadium; Attendance: 0 Referee: Darren Drysdale

17 April 2021 41	Wigan Athletic	2–0	Crewe Alexandra	Wigan
12:30 BST	Dodoo 15'; Darikwa (yellow card) 66'; Evans 72' (pen.)	Report	Beckles (red card) 70'	Stadium: DW Stadium; Attendance: 0 Referee: Declan Bourne

20 April 2021 42	Fleetwood Town	0–2	Crewe Alexandra	Fleetwood
19:45 BST	Connolly (yellow card) 14'; Vassell (penalty missed) 27'; Andrew (yellow card) 69'; Baggley (yellow card) 76'	Report	Dale 24'; Adebisi (yellow card) 45+4'; Murphy (yellow card) 54'; Porter 83' (pen.)	Stadium: Highbury Stadium; Attendance: 0 Referee: Ross Joyce

24 April 2021 43	Crewe Alexandra	1–1	Rochdale	Crewe
15:00 BST	Evans (yellow card) 52'; Kirk (penalty missed) 90', 90'	Report	O'Connell (yellow card) 90'; Done 90+7'	Stadium: Alexandra Stadium; Attendance: 0 Referee: Andy Haines

27 April 2021 44	Charlton Athletic	2–2	Crewe Alexandra	Charlton
19:00 BST	Stockley 10'; Maatsen (yellow card) 50'; Gilbey (yellow card) 60', (goal) 83'; Pearce (yellow card) 61'	Report	Dale (yellow card) 29', (goal) 67', 90+6'; Wood (yellow card) 45+1'; Kirk (yellow card) 90'	Stadium: The Valley; Attendance: 0 Referee: Trevor Kettle

1 May 2021 45	Bristol Rovers	0–1	Crewe Alexandra	Horfield
15:00 BST	Baldwin (yellow card) 41'	Report	Ainley 19'	Stadium: Memorial Stadium; Attendance: 0 Referee: Craig Hicks

9 May 2021 46	Crewe Alexandra	3–2	Shrewsbury Town	Crewe
12:00 BST	Mandron 10', 21'; Porter 81'	Report	Whalley 34'; Udoh 42'	Stadium: Alexandra Stadium; Attendance: 0 Referee: Anthony Backhouse

=== FA Cup ===
The draw for the first round was made on Monday 26, October. The second round draw was revealed on Monday, 9 November by Danny Cowley.

Win Draw Loss

7 November 2020 First round	Bolton Wanderers	2–3	Crewe Alexandra	Bolton
15:00 BST	Delfouneso 37', 78'	Report	Mandron 29'; Finney 70'; Kirk 75'	Stadium: University of Bolton Stadium; Attendance: 0 Referee: Robert Lewis

28 November 2020 Second round	Cheltenham Town	2–1 (a.e.t.)	Crewe Alexandra	Cheltenham
15:00 GMT	Azaz 2'; Freestone (yellow card) 30'; May (yellow card) 80'; Lloyd 94'	Report	Porter 63'	Stadium: Whaddon Road Ground; Attendance: 0 Referee: James Adcock

=== EFL Cup ===
Win Draw Loss

The first round draw was made on 18 August, live on Sky Sports, by Paul Merson.

5 September 2020 First round	Crewe Alexandra	1–2	Lincoln City	Crewe
15:00 BST	Dale (yellow card) 47'; Sass-Davies 55'	Report	Hopper 52'; Montsma 66' (yellow card) 90+2'	Stadium: Alexandra Stadium; Attendance: 0 Referee: Scott Oldham

=== EFL Trophy ===
The regional group stage draw was confirmed on 18 August. The second round draw was made by Matt Murray on 20 November, at St Andrew's.

Pos	Div	Team	Pld	W	PW	PL	L	GF	GA	GD	Pts	Qualification
1	L1	Shrewsbury Town	3	3	0	0	0	9	4	+5	9	Advance to Round 2
2	L1	Crewe Alexandra	3	2	0	0	1	7	6	+1	6	Advance to Round 2
3	L2	Bolton Wanderers	3	1	0	0	2	6	7	−1	3	
4	ACA	Newcastle United U21	3	0	0	0	3	2	7	−5	0	

Source: EFL.com

Win Draw Loss

8 September 2020	Bolton Wanderers	2–3	Crewe Alexandra	Horwich
19:00 BST	Delaney 53'; Miller 75'	Report	Mandron 15', 89' (pen.); Dale 66'	Stadium: University of Bolton Stadium; Attendance: 0 Referee: Anthony Backhouse

29 September 2020 Group stage	Crewe Alexandra	1–0	Newcastle United U21	Crewe
19:00 BST	Lowery (yellow card) 55'; Pickering 66'	Report		Stadium: Alexandra Stadium; Attendance: 0 Referee: Robert Lewis

10 November 2020 Group stage	Crewe Alexandra	3–4	Shrewsbury Town	Crewe
18:00 GMT	Griffiths (yellow card) 31'; Powell 34', 60'; Zanzala 40'	Report	Ebanks-Landell (yellow card) 13'; Millar 17'; Tracey 25', 76', 82'; Pierre (yellow card) 45+2'; Love (yellow card) 48'; Barnett (yellow card) 90+3'	Stadium: Alexandra Stadium; Attendance: 0 Referee: Declan Bourne

8 December 2020 Round 2	Hull City	0–0 (3–2 p)	Crewe Alexandra	Kingston upon Hull
17:30 GMT	Arthur (yellow card) 87'	Report	Porter (yellow card) 19'; Nolan (yellow card) 55'	Stadium: KCOM Stadium; Attendance: 0 Referee: James Bell
	Penalties
	Docherty (penalty missed); Chadwick (penalty scored); Coyle (penalty scored); Wilks (penalty missed); Adelakun (penalty scored)		Porter (penalty scored); Finney (penalty missed); Griffiths (penalty missed); Zanzala (penalty missed); Ng (penalty scored)

== Statistics ==
As of 8 May 2021

=== Appearances ===
No.	Pos	Nat	Player	Total		League One		FA Cup		League Cup		League Trophy	
No.	Pos	Nat	Player	Apps	Goals	Apps	Goals	Apps	Goals	Apps	Goals	Apps	Goals
1	GK	(Finland) FIN	Will Jääskeläinen	33	0	31+0	0	2+0	0	0+0	0	0+0	0
3	DF	(England) ENG	Harry Pickering	49	4	44+0	3	2+0	0	1+0	0	1+1	1
4	MF	(England) ENG	Ryan Wintle	48	3	41+2	3	2+0	0	1+0	0	2+0	0
5	DF	(Montserrat) MSR	Donervon Daniels	16	0	11+4	0	0+0	0	0+0	0	1+0	0
6	DF	(Republic of Ireland) IRL	Eddie Nolan	2	0	0+0	0	0+0	0	0+0	0	2+0	0
7	MF	(England) ENG	Daniel Powell	28	3	14+11	1	2+0	0	0+0	0	1+0	2
8	MF	(England) ENG	Tom Lowery	39	3	29+7	3	1+1	0	0+0	0	1+0	0
9	FW	(England) ENG	Chris Porter	37	8	15+20	7	1+0	1	0+0	0	1+0	0
10	MF	(England) ENG	Charlie Kirk	48	7	41+1	6	2+0	1	1+0	0	2+1	0
11	MF	(England) ENG	Callum Ainley	28	1	12+10	1	1+1	0	0+1	0	3+0	0
12	FW	(France) FRA	Mikael Mandron	45	14	35+7	11	1+0	1	1+0	0	1+0	2
13	GK	(Wales) WAL	Dave Richards	20	0	15+0	0	0+0	0	1+0	0	4+0	0
14	MF	(England) ENG	Oliver Finney	32	8	19+7	7	1+1	1	1+0	0	2+1	0
16	DF	(England) ENG	Olly Lancashire	26	2	20+2	2	1+0	0	1+0	0	2+0	0
17	DF	(England) ENG	Luke Offord	31	1	28+1	1	2+0	0	0+0	0	0+0	0
18	MF	(England) ENG	Regan Griffiths	4	0	0+2	0	0+0	0	0+0	0	2+0	0
19	FW	(England) ENG	Owen Dale	48	10	33+10	9	0+2	0	1+0	0	2+0	1
20	MF	(England) ENG	Josh Lundstram	6	0	0+4	0	0+0	0	0+0	0	2+0	0
21	DF	(England) ENG	Rio Adebisi	18	0	11+5	0	0+0	0	0+0	0	2+0	0
22	DF	(Wales) WAL	Billy Sass-Davies	4	1	0+0	0	0+0	0	1+0	1	3+0	0
23	DF	(England) ENG	Travis Johnson	12	0	5+2	0	0+1	0	0+0	0	4+0	0
28	MF	(England) ENG	Luke Murphy	43	0	28+12	0	1+0	0	1+0	0	0+1	0
29	DF	(Grenada) GRN	Omar Beckles	43	1	37+4	1	1+0	0	0+0	0	1+0	0
30	DF	(England) ENG	Billy Jones	2	0	2+0	0	0+0	0	0+0	0	0+0	0
31	FW	(England) ENG	Stephen Walker	10	1	1+9	1	0+0	0	0+0	0	0+0	0
32	MF	(England) ENG	Antony Evans	13	0	5+8	0	0+0	0	0+0	0	0+0	0
33	DF	(England) ENG	Nathan Wood	12	0	11+1	0	0+0	0	0+0	0	0+0	0
Players who left the club:
2	DF	(England) ENG	Perry Ng	20	1	15+0	1	2+0	0	1+0	0	1+1	0
15	FW	(Republic of the Congo) CGO	Offrande Zanzala	10	1	1+4	0	0+1	0	0+0	0	4+0	1

=== Goals record ===
As of 8 May 2021

Rank	No.	Nat.	Po.	Name	League One	FA Cup	League Cup	League Trophy	Total
1	12	(France)	CF	Mikael Mandron	11	1	0	2	14
2	19	(England)	RW	Owen Dale	12	0	0	1	13
3	14	(England)	CM	Oliver Finney	7	1	0	0	8
4	10	(England)	LW	Charlie Kirk	6	1	0	0	7
5	9	(England)	CF	Chris Porter	5	1	0	0	6
6	3	(England)	LB	Harry Pickering	3	0	0	1	4
7	4	(England)	DM	Ryan Wintle	3	0	0	0	3
7	7	(England)	RW	Daniel Powell	1	0	0	2	3
7	8	(England)	CM	Tom Lowery	3	0	0	0	3
10	16	(England)	CB	Olly Lancashire	2	0	0	0	2
11	2	(England)	RB	Perry Ng	1	0	0	0	1
11	11	(England)	LM	Callum Ainley	1	0	0	0	1
11	~~15~~	(Republic of the Congo)	CF	Offrande Zanzala	0	0	0	1	1
11	17	(England)	CB	Luke Offord	1	0	0	0	1
11	22	(Wales)	CB	Billy Sass-Davies	0	0	1	0	1
11	29	(Grenada)	CB	Omar Beckles	1	0	0	0	1
11	33	(England)	SS	Stephen Walker	1	0	0	0	1
Total					58	4	1	7	69

=== Disciplinary record ===
As of 26 January 2021

Rank	No.	Nat.	Po.	Name	League One			FA Cup			League Cup			League Trophy			Total		
Rank	No.	Nat.	Po.	Name	Yellow card	(yellow card) (yellow-red card)	Red card	Yellow card	(yellow card) (yellow-red card)	Red card	Yellow card	(yellow card) (yellow-red card)	Red card	Yellow card	(yellow card) (yellow-red card)	Red card	Yellow card	(yellow card) (yellow-red card)	Red card
1	29	(Grenada)	CB	Omar Beckles	7	0	1	0	0	0	0	0	0	0	0	0	7	0	1
2	17	(England)	CB	Luke Offord	6	0	0	0	0	0	0	0	0	0	0	0	6	0	0
3	8	(England)	CM	Tom Lowery	4	0	0	0	0	0	0	0	0	1	0	0	5	0	0
3	19	(England)	RW	Owen Dale	4	0	0	0	0	0	1	0	0	0	0	0	5	0	0
5	3	(England)	LB	Harry Pickering	4	0	0	0	0	0	0	0	0	0	0	0	4	0	0
5	4	(England)	DM	Ryan Wintle	4	0	0	0	0	0	0	0	0	0	0	0	4	0	0
5	28	(England)	CM	Luke Murphy	4	0	0	0	0	0	0	0	0	0	0	0	4	0	0
8	2	(England)	RB	Perry Ng	3	0	0	0	0	0	0	0	0	0	0	0	3	0	0
8	23	(England)	RB	Travis Johnson	3	0	0	0	0	0	0	0	0	0	0	0	3	0	0
10	1	(Finland)	GK	Will Jääskeläinen	2	0	0	0	0	0	0	0	0	0	0	0	2	0	0
10	10	(England)	LW	Charlie Kirk	2	0	0	0	0	0	0	0	0	0	0	0	2	0	0
10	12	(France)	CF	Mikael Mandron	2	0	0	0	0	0	0	0	0	0	0	0	2	0	0
10	14	(England)	CM	Oliver Finney	2	0	0	0	0	0	0	0	0	0	0	0	2	0	0
10	16	(England)	CB	Olly Lancashire	2	0	0	0	0	0	0	0	0	0	0	0	2	0	0
15	6	(Republic of Ireland)	CB	Eddie Nolan	0	0	0	0	0	0	0	0	0	1	0	0	1	0	0
15	9	(England)	CF	Chris Porter	0	0	0	0	0	0	0	0	0	1	0	0	1	0	0
15	21	(England)	RB	Rio Adebisi	1	0	0	0	0	0	0	0	0	0	0	0	1	0	0
15	32	(England)	AM	Antony Evans	1	0	0	0	0	0	0	0	0	0	0	0	1	0	0
15	33	(England)	CB	Nathan Wood	1	0	0	0	0	0	0	0	0	0	0	0	1	0	0
Total					52	0	1	0	0	0	1	0	0	3	0	0	56	0	1
