= Mikael Mandron =

French footballer (born 1994)

Personal information
- Full name: Mikael Yann Mathieu Mandron
- Date of birth: 11 October 1994 (age 32)
- Place of birth: Boulogne-Billancourt, France
- Height: 1.91 m (6 ft 3 in)
- Position: Striker

Team information
- Current team: Stockport County
- Number: 22

Youth career
- INF Clairefontaine
- Boulogne-Billancourt
- 2011–2013: Sunderland

Senior career*
Years	Team	Apps	(Gls)
2013–2016	Sunderland	3	(0)
2014	→ Fleetwood Town (loan)	11	(1)
2015	→ Shrewsbury Town (loan)	3	(0)
2015–2016	→ Hartlepool United (loan)	5	(0)
2016–2017	Eastleigh	28	(10)
2017	Wigan Athletic	3	(0)
2017–2019	Colchester United	85	(12)
2019–2020	Gillingham	23	(5)
2020–2022	Crewe Alexandra	75	(18)
2022–2023	Gillingham	23	(1)
2023	Motherwell	10	(1)
2023–2026	St Mirren	104	(19)
2026–	Stockport County	9	(3)
- * Club domestic league appearances and goals as of 00:43, 26 October 2026 (UTC)

Mikael Yann Mathieu Mandron (born 11 October 1994) is a French professional footballer who plays as a striker for EFL League One side Stockport County.

Mandron joined the Academy at Sunderland from the French lower leagues in the summer of 2011. He completed his two-year scholarship before making his Premier League debut in April 2013. He joined League Two side Fleetwood Town on loan in 2014 and spent time on loan at fellow League Two club Shrewsbury Town in 2015. He had a final loan at Hartlepool United in late 2015 before being released by Sunderland in summer 2016.

He signed for National League side Eastleigh, where his performances earned the attention of Championship club Wigan Athletic, signing in January 2017. He then signed for League Two club Colchester United in July 2017. He made 95 appearances for Colchester before his release in summer 2019, then spent a season at Gillingham and two seasons at Crewe Alexandra.

== Club career ==
=== Sunderland ===
Born in Boulogne-Billancourt, France, Mandron attended the Clairefontaine Academy like compatriots Thierry Henry and Nicolas Anelka. He came through the youth ranks at Boulogne-Billancourt, for whom he had played since the age of seven. He joined Sunderland's Academy in the summer of 2011 at the age of 16 on a two-year scholarship.

Following an injury to Steven Fletcher, Mandron was called into training with the first team in March 2013. On 29 April, Mandron made his professional debut against Aston Villa, coming on as an 85th-minute substitute and replacing Danny Graham in a 6–1 defeat.

With first-team opportunities limited at Sunderland, on 7 January 2014 Mandron agreed to join League Two club Fleetwood Town until the end of the season. He made his debut on 11 January in a 1–0 win over Dagenham & Redbridge. He then scored his first professional goal on 1 February 2014, in a 2–1 loss to York City. He went on to make 13 appearances before returning to his parent club in March 2014.

On 28 January 2015, Mandron signed on a youth loan for League Two side Shrewsbury Town until the end of the season. He made his Shrewsbury debut three days later, in a 1–0 win over Newport County. He made three appearances for the club.

On 13 November 2015, Mandron joined League Two side Hartlepool United on loan until 2 January 2016. He made his Hartlepool debut against Leyton Orient on 15 November in a 3–1 win. He scored his second career goal on 15 December in Hartlepool's FA Cup second round replay against Salford City. He scored in the 120th-minute of the game after the match ended 0–0. After picking up a groin strain, Hartlepool ended his loan early in late December after the striker had scored one goal in seven appearances.

Sunderland announced in April 2016 that Mandron would be one of four players to be released at the end of the season on the expiry of his contract.

=== Eastleigh ===
National League side Eastleigh signed Mandron on a two-year contract on 14 June 2016 following his release by Sunderland. He had previously been linked with a move to Scottish Premiership side Partick Thistle. He made his Eastleigh debut on 6 August, starting in their 2–1 win against Guiseley before being replaced in the 84th minute. He scored his first goals for the club on 29 August with a hat-trick against Bromley. After scoring 15 goals in 33 games for Eastleigh, he was linked with a move back to the English Football League after Championship side Wigan Athletic had an undisclosed offer accepted by Eastleigh.

=== Wigan Athletic ===
On 31 January 2017, Wigan Athletic signed Mandron on a 2 1/2-year contract for an undisclosed fee. He came off the bench to make his Wigan debut on 21 February in their 2–1 defeat at Queens Park Rangers. He made one start and two substitute appearances before the end of the campaign.

=== Colchester United ===
After making only three appearances for Wigan, Mandron moved to League Two club Colchester United for an undisclosed fee on 21 July 2017, signing a two-year contract. He made his Colchester debut on 5 August in their 3–1 defeat at Accrington Stanley. He scored his first Colchester goal on 12 August with the equaliser in a 1–1 draw with Stevenage. He was sent off for the first time in his professional career when he handled the ball in the penalty area during Colchester's 3–1 defeat at Cheltenham Town on 16 September. He was named in the 'EFL Team of the Week' after scoring two goals against Crewe Alexandra which brought his tally to four goals in his last five games. He was nominated for the EFL League Two Player of the Month award after scoring four goals in five games during the month of October.

=== Gillingham ===
On the expiry of his contract in summer 2019, Mandron was released by Colchester United, and subsequently joined Gillingham. He scored his first goal for Gillingham in an EFL Trophy tie against former club Colchester United on 3 September 2019. He scored six goals during the 2019–20 season, including a brace at former club Sunderland on 7 March 2020 in what would be the last game the Kent side played before the season was curtailed due to the Coronavirus pandemic.

=== Crewe Alexandra ===
Mandron joined Crewe Alexandra in August 2020 on a 12-month contract, and made his Crewe debut in a 1–2 defeat by Lincoln City in the first round of the EFL Cup at Gresty Road on 5 September. He scored his first two Crewe goals in the next fixture, a 3–2 victory at Bolton Wanderers in an EFL Trophy group game on 8 September 2020. In February 2021, Mandron signed a contract through to the summer of 2022. He scored twice in Crewe's final game of the season, a 3–2 win over Shrewsbury Town at Gresty Road, taking his season's tally in all competitions to 14, and making him Crewe's top scorer of the 2020–21 season.

Crewe struggled the following season but Mandron was again the club's leading scorer, with nine goals in all competitions, before incurring a knee injury against Gillingham at Priestfield on 1 February 2022, potentially sidelining him for "an extended period", though a subsequent scan proved it to be less serious than initially feared. He finished the season as joint top scorer, with 10 goals (level with Chris Long), but following Crewe's relegation to League Two, Mandron confirmed in May 2022 that he would not be extending his contract at the club.

=== Gillingham ===
Mandron returned to Gillingham on 11 July 2022. He scored the first goal of his second spell with the club in a EFL Cup fixture against AFC Wimbledon on 9 August 2022. In the third round of the same competition Mandron scored an equalising header and in the penalty shootout as Gillingham knocked out Premier League side Brentford, helping the Kent side to reach the fourth round of the competition for the first time since 1996.

=== Motherwell ===
In January 2023, Mandron agreed to the termination of his contract with Gillingham and shortly afterwards signed for Motherwell of the Scottish Premiership. He scored his first two goals for the club in a Scottish Cup victory away to Arbroath.

=== St. Mirren ===
After leaving Motherwell at the end of his short term contract, he signed a two-year contract with league rivals St. Mirren on 7 July 2023. In his first season, he scored eight league goals and four in the cup as part of a fifth-place finish in the league, which resulted in Europa Conference League qualification for the Paisley side. He went on to feature in all four euro qualifying ties the following season. In his second season, he scored seven league goals and one in the Scottish Cup. He further extended his contract at the end of the 2024–25 for an extra year, keeping him contracted to the club till the summer of 2026.

In the 2025–26 season, Mandron was an integral member of the squad that went on to win the Scottish League Cup 3-1 against Celtic in December 2025. Mandron racked up a total of seven league cup goals (the competitions top scorer) including two in the semi-final at Hampden Park against his former club Motherwell. He also scored two second-half goals in the Scottish Cup semi-final against Celtic on 19 April 2026, the second a 91st-minute equaliser. He joined Stockport County in August 2026

=== Stockport County ===
On 5 August 2026, Mandron joined to Stockport Count on a one-year contract.

== International career ==
Eligible to represent England, France, and Scotland at international level, Mandron was called up to the Scotland under-20 team in May 2013. He qualifies to play for Scotland through an Aberdeen-born grandparent.

== Style of play ==
Possessing a big physique, striker Mandron uses this trait to back into defenders, collect the ball by dropping deeper into the midfield, and hold the ball up, with the ability to win headers from set-plays.

== Personal life ==
Mandron supported Real Madrid when growing up, while he also followed the results of Paris Saint-Germain.

== Career statistics ==
As of match played 20 October 2026

Appearances and goals by club, season and competition
Club	Season	League			National cup (Note: Includes FA Cup, Scottish Cup)		League cup (Note: Includes EFL Cup, Scottish League Cup)		Other		Total	
Club	Season	Division	Apps	Goals	Apps	Goals	Apps	Goals	Apps	Goals	Apps	Goals
Sunderland	2012–13	Premier League	2	0	0	0	0	0	–		2	0
Sunderland	2013–14	Premier League	0	0	0	0	0	0	–		0	0
Sunderland	2014–15	Premier League	1	0	0	0	0	0	–		1	0
Sunderland	2014–15	Premier League	0	0	0	0	0	0	–		0	0
Sunderland	Total		3	0	0	0	0	0	–		3	0
Fleetwood Town (loan)	2013–14	League Two	11	1	0	0	0	0	2 (Note: Appearances in Football League Trophy)	0	13	1
Shrewsbury Town (loan)	2014–15	League Two	3	0	0	0	0	0	0	0	3	0
Hartlepool United (loan)	2015–16	League Two	5	0	2	1	0	0	0	0	7	1
Eastleigh	2016–17	National League	28	10	5	5	–		0	0	33	15
Wigan Athletic	2016–17	Championship	3	0	–		0	0	0	0	3	0
Colchester United	2017–18	League Two	44	10	1	0	1	0	3 (Note: Appearances in EFL Trophy)	0	49	10
Colchester United	2018–19	League Two	41	2	1	0	1	0	3	0	46	2
Colchester United	Total		85	12	2	0	2	0	6	0	95	12
Gillingham	2019–20	League One	23	5	2	0	1	0	2	1	28	6
Crewe Alexandra	2020–21	League One	42	11	1	1	1	0	1	2	45	14
Crewe Alexandra	2021–22	League One	33	7	1	0	2	0	4	3	40	10
Crewe Alexandra	Total		75	18	2	1	3	0	5	5	85	24
Gillingham	2022–23	League Two	23	1	2	1	4	2	3	0	32	4
Motherwell	2022–23	Scottish Premiership	10	1	1	2	–		–		11	3
St Mirren	2023–24	Scottish Premiership	35	8	2	0	6	3	–		43	11
St Mirren	2024–25	Scottish Premiership	34	7	2	1	1	0	3 (Note: Appearances in UEFA Conference League)	0	40	8
St Mirren	2025–26	Scottish Premiership	35	4	3	2	8	7	2 (Note: Appearances in Scottish Premiership play-offs)	0	48	13
St Mirren	Total		104	19	7	3	15	10	5	0	131	32
Stockport County	2026–27	League One	9	3	0	0	0	0	2	1	11	4
Career total			382	70	23	13	25	12	25	7	455	102

== Honours ==
St Mirren

- Scottish League Cup: 2025–26

Individual

- Scottish League Cup top scorer: 2025–26
