= Stephen Walker (footballer) =

English footballer

- Davies with Yeovil Town in 2026

Personal information
- Full name: Stephen John Walker
- Date of birth: 11 October 2000 (age 26)
- Place of birth: Middlesbrough, England
- Height: 1.81 m (5 ft 11 in)
- Position: Forward

Team information
- Current team: Morecambe

Youth career
- –2016: Middlesbrough

Senior career*
Years	Team	Apps	(Gls)
2016–2023	Middlesbrough	7	(0)
2019	→ Milton Keynes Dons (loan)	7	(0)
2020	→ Crewe Alexandra (loan)	6	(1)
2020–2021	→ Milton Keynes Dons (loan)	12	(2)
2021	→ Crewe Alexandra (loan)	6	(1)
2021–2022	→ Tranmere Rovers (loan)	0	(0)
2023	West Auckland Town	5	(1)
2023–2025	Whitby Town	43	(14)
2025–2026	Scarborough Athletic	53	(22)
2026	Yeovil Town	10	(2)
2026–	Morecambe	0	(0)

International career^{‡}
2017	England U17	3	(1)
2018	England U18	5	(2)
2018–2019	England U19	9	(6)
- * Club domestic league appearances and goals as of 11:11, 28 October 2026 (UTC) ‡ National team caps and goals as of 20:17, 26 March 2019 (UTC)

Stephen John Walker (born 11 October 2000) is an English professional footballer who plays as a forward for club Morecambe.

== Club career ==
=== Middlesbrough ===
Walker signed his first professional contract with the club on 1 July 2016. He made his debut for the club on 14 August 2018, assisting an Ashley Fletcher goal and scoring a penalty in the penalty shoot-out during an EFL Cup tie with Notts County at the Riverside Stadium. On 30 January 2019, Walker signed a new four-and-a-half-year contract with Middlesbrough.

The following day, Walker was loaned to League Two club Milton Keynes Dons until the end of the season. Exactly one year later, on 31 January 2020, he joined League Two side Crewe Alexandra on loan until the end of the season, making his debut at Gresty Road against Oldham Athletic on 8 February 2020. He scored his first professional goal, for Crewe in a 2–0 win over Macclesfield Town at Gresty Road, on 22 February 2020.

On 16 October 2020, Stephen Walker signed a season-long loan deal with MK Dons, returning to stadium mk for a second spell with the Buckinghamshire outfit. After appearing in twelve league games for the Dons, Walker was recalled by Middlesbrough on 13 January 2021.

On 22 January 2021, Walker was then loaned again to Crewe until the end of the 2020–21 season. He scored the first goal of his new loan spell, equalising in a 1–1 draw at Blackpool on 2 March 2021.

On 31 August 2021, Walker joined League Two side Tranmere Rovers on a season-long loan deal.

=== Non-League ===
After being released by Middlesbrough in the early parts of 2023, Walker spent time on trial with Carlisle United in the summer. In September 2023, he joined Northern Football League side West Auckland Town.

In December 2023, he signed for Northern Premier League side Whitby Town. At the end of the season, Walker signed a new contract with Whitby.

On 4 February 2025, Walker joined National League North club Scarborough Athletic for an undisclosed fee.

On 9 June 2026, Walker joined National League club Yeovil Town on a two-year deal.

On 21 November 2026, Walker signed for National League North club Morecambe for a "significant undisclosed fee".

== International career ==
Walker has represented England at U17, U18 and U19 level. In March 2018, Walker scored twice for England's under-18s against Qatar.

In October 2018, Walker scored a hat-trick for the under-19s against Macedonia. He then scored the winner in a qualifier against Iceland U19.

== Career statistics ==
As of match played 10 November 2026

Club	Season	League			FA Cup		League Cup		Other		Total	
Club	Season	Division	Apps	Goals	Apps	Goals	Apps	Goals	Apps	Goals	Apps	Goals
Middlesbrough	2018–19	Championship	0	0	1	0	1	0	1 (Note: Appearance(s) in the EFL Trophy)	0	3	0
Middlesbrough	2019–20	Championship	7	0	0	0	0	0	1	0	8	0
Middlesbrough	2020–21	Championship	0	0	0	0	0	0	—		0	0
Middlesbrough	2021–22	Championship	0	0	0	0	0	0	—		0	0
Middlesbrough	Total		7	0	1	0	1	0	2	0	11	0
Milton Keynes Dons (loan)	2018–19	League Two	7	0	—		—		0	0	7	0
Crewe Alexandra (loan)	2019–20	League Two	5	1	—		—		0	0	5	1
Milton Keynes Dons (loan)	2020–21	League One	12	2	2	0	—		3	3	17	5
Crewe Alexandra (loan)	2020–21	League One	6	1	—		—		0	0	6	1
Tranmere Rovers (loan)	2021–22	League Two	0	0	0	0	0	0	3	1	3	1
Whitby Town	2023–24	NPL Premier Division	21	5	—		—		3 (Note: Appearance(s) in North Riding Senior Cup)	3	24	8
Whitby Town	2024–25	NPL Premier Division	22	9	2	5	—		2 (Note: One appearance in FA Trophy, one appearance in North Riding Senior Cup)	0	26	14
Whitby Town	Total		43	14	2	5	0	0	5	3	50	22
Scarborough Athletic	2024–25	National League North	14	4	—		—		0	0	14	4
Scarborough Athletic	2025–26	National League North	39	18	1	0	—		2 (Note: One appearance in North Riding Senior Cup, one appearance and one goal in National League North play-offs)	1	42	19
Scarborough Athletic	Total		53	22	1	0	—		2	1	56	23
Yeovil Town	2026–27	National League	10	2	3	0	—		2 (Note: Appearances in Somerset Premier Cup)	1	15	3
Morecambe	2026–27	National League North	0	0	—		—		0	0	0	0
Career totals			143	42	9	5	1	0	17	9	170	56
