= 2018–19 Crewe Alexandra F.C. season =

Crewe Alexandra
2018–19 season
- Chairman: John Bowler
- Manager: David Artell
- Stadium: Gresty Road
- League Two: 12th
- FA Cup: Eliminated in the first round (vs. Carlisle United)
- EFL Cup: Eliminated in the first round (vs. Fleetwood Town)
- EFL Trophy: Eliminated in the group stage
- Top goalscorer: League: Chris Porter (13); All: Chris Porter (15)

The 2018–19 season was Crewe Alexandra's 142nd season in their history, their 95th in the English Football League and third consecutive in League Two. Along with competing in League Two, the club also participated in the 2018–19 FA Cup, 2018–19 EFL Cup and 2018–19 EFL Trophy.

The season covers the period from 1 July 2018 to 30 June 2019.

== Competitions ==
=== Friendlies ===
The Railwaymen announced pre-season friendlies with Colwyn Bay, Barrow, Bala Town, Kidsgrove Athletic, Altrincham, Nantwich Town, Leek Town and Blackpool.

7 July 2018 Friendly	Nantwich Town	0-1	Crewe Alexandra	Nantwich
19:30 BST				Stadium: Weaver Stadium

10 July 2018 Friendly	Colwyn Bay	1–2	Crewe Alexandra	Old Colwyn, Wales
11:45 BST	Barnes	Report	Ainley; Griffiths	Stadium: Llanelian Road

14 July 2018 Friendly	Barrow	1–0	Crewe Alexandra	Barrow-in-Furness
15:00 BST	Molyneux 81'	Report		Stadium: Holker Street

17 July 2018 Friendly	Bala Town	1–0	Crewe Alexandra	Bala, Wales
19:30 BST	Smith 73'	Report		Stadium: Maes Tegid

17 July 2018 Friendly	Kidsgrove Athletic	1-2	Crewe Alexandra	Kidsgrove
19:30 BST				Stadium: Hollinwood Road

20 July 2018 Friendly	Altrincham	0–3	Crewe Alexandra	Altrincham
19:45 BST		Report	Ng 5'; Bowery 10'; Wintle 16'	Stadium: Moss Lane

26 July 2018 Friendly	Leek Town	1–1	Crewe Alexandra	Leek
19:30 BST	Grice 71'	Report	Reilly 59'	Stadium: Harrison Park

28 July 2018 Friendly	Crewe Alexandra	1–1	Blackpool	Crewe
15:00 BST	Nicholls 51'	Report	Taylor 8'	Stadium: Gresty Road

=== League Two ===
==== League table ====
Pos	Team	Pld	W	D	L	GF	GA	GD	Pts
10	Stevenage	46	20	10	16	59	55	+4	70
11	Carlisle United	46	20	8	18	67	62	+5	68
12	Crewe Alexandra	46	19	8	19	60	59	+1	65
13	Swindon Town	46	16	16	14	59	56	+3	64
14	Oldham Athletic	46	16	14	16	67	60	+7	62

Source: EFL Official Website
Rules for classification: 1) Points; 2) Goal difference; 3) Number of goals scored; 4) Head-to-head results

==== Results summary ====
Overall								Home						Away					
Pld	W	D	L	GF	GA	GD	Pts	W	D	L	GF	GA	GD	W	D	L	GF	GA	GD
46	19	8	19	60	59	+1	65	15	2	6	45	25	+20	4	6	13	15	34	−19

Last updated: 4 May 2019.
Source: BBC

==== Results by matchday ====
Matchday	1	2	3	4	5	6	7	8	9	10	11	12	13	14	15	16	17	18	19	20	21	22	23	24	25	26	27	28	29	30	31	32	33	34	35	36	37	38	39	40	41	42	43	44	45	46
Ground	H	A	H	A	A	H	A	H	A	H	A	H	A	A	H	H	A	H	A	H	H	A	A	H	H	A	A	H	A	H	A	H	A	H	H	A	A	H	A	H	A	H	H	A	H	A
Result	W	L	D	L	L	W	D	L	L	W	L	D	W	D	W	L	L	W	L	W	L	L	L	W	W	L	D	W	W	W	D	W	D	L	L	L	D	W	W	L	L	W	W	W	W	L
Position	1	9	10	16	19	14	17	17	18	17	18	18	17	17	17	17	18	15	16	15	17	17	18	17	15	15	15	14	14	11	15	13	13	14	15	15	15	14	12	13	15	14	14	13	12	12

Updated to match(es) played on 4 May 2019. Source: Statto.com
A = Away; H = Home; W = Win; D = Draw; L = Loss

==== Matches ====
4 August 2018 1	Crewe Alexandra	6–0	Morecambe	Crewe
15:00 BST	Kirk 6'; Nicholls 10', 63'; Jones 72', 90+1'; Porter 87'	Report		Stadium: Gresty Road; Attendance: 3,559; Referee: Alan Young

11 August 2018 2	Newport County	1–0	Crewe Alexandra	Newport
15:00 BST	Amond 33'	Report		Stadium: Rodney Parade; Attendance: 3,243; Referee: Brett Huxtable

18 August 2018 3	Crewe Alexandra	0–0	Milton Keynes Dons	Crewe
15:00 BST		Report	Baudry (red card) 89'	Stadium: Gresty Road; Attendance: 3,505; Referee: Robert Lewis

21 August 2018 4	Colchester United	6–0	Crewe Alexandra	Colchester
19:45 BST	Kent 4'; Dickenson 8', 26'; Jackson 59'; Norris 74'; Lapslie 77'	Report		Stadium: Colchester Community Stadium; Attendance: 2,842; Referee: Neil Hair

25 August 2018 5	Carlisle United	1–0	Crewe Alexandra	Carlisle
15:00 BST	Nadesan 69'	Report		Stadium: Brunton Park; Attendance: 4,238; Referee: Seb Stockbridge

1 September 2018 6	Crewe Alexandra	3–0	Macclesfield Town	Crewe
15:00 BST	Kirk 17'; Bowery 40', 68'	Report		Stadium: Gresty Road; Attendance: 3,915; Referee: Carl Boyeson

15 September 2018 7	Cheltenham Town	0–0	Crewe Alexandra	Cheltenham
15:00 BST		Report		Stadium: Whaddon Road; Attendance: 2,921; Referee: Brett Huxtable

22 September 2018 8	Crewe Alexandra	0–1	Port Vale	Crewe
15:00 BST		Report	Legge 75'	Stadium: Gresty Road; Attendance: 6,180; Referee: Darren Drysdale

29 September 2018 9	Notts County	2–1	Crewe Alexandra	Nottingham
15:00 BST	Milsom 5'; Hewitt 61'	Report	Bowery 14'	Stadium: Meadow Lane; Attendance: 6,117; Referee: Andy Woolmer

2 October 2018 10	Crewe Alexandra	1–0	Swindon Town	Crewe
19:45 BST	Kirk 30'	Report		Stadium: Gresty Road; Attendance: 2,761; Referee: Ben Toner

6 October 2018 11	Lincoln City	1–0	Crewe Alexandra	Lincoln
15:00 BST	Frecklington (yellow card) 26'; Pett 58'	Report	Ng (yellow card) 38'	Stadium: Sincil Bank; Attendance: 8,718; Referee: Paul Marsden

13 October 2018 12	Crewe Alexandra	1–1	Bury	Crewe
19:45 BST	Kirk 37'; Ng (yellow card) 59'; Jones (yellow card) 67'; Miller (yellow card) 90'	Report	Maynard 54'; McFadzean (yellow card) 87'	Stadium: Gresty Road; Attendance: 3,777; Referee: Graham Salisbury

20 October 2018 13	Stevenage	0–1	Crewe Alexandra	Stevenage
15:00 BST	Nugent (red card) 12'	Report	Bowery 61'	Stadium: Broadhall Way; Attendance: 2,164; Referee: Craig Hicks

23 October 2018 14	Yeovil Town	1–1	Crewe Alexandra	Yeovil
19:45 BST	Fisher 25'	Report	Bowery 14'	Stadium: Huish Park; Attendance: 2,397; Referee: Kevin Johnson

27 October 2018 15	Crewe Alexandra	2–0	Grimsby Town	Crewe
15:00 BST	Whelan 70'; Miller 77'	Report		Stadium: Gresty Road; Attendance: 3,725; Referee: Peter Wright

30 October 2018 16	Crewe Alexandra	0–3	Mansfield Town	Crewe
19:45 GMT		Report	Elšnik 8', 35'; Walker 61'	Stadium: Gresty Road; Attendance: 2,973; Referee: Chris Sarginson

3 November 2018 17	Northampton Town	2–0	Crewe Alexandra	Northampton
15:00 GMT	Williams 19'; Powell 81'	Report		Stadium: Sixfields Stadium; Attendance: 5,401; Referee: Scott Oldham

17 November 2018 18	Crewe Alexandra	3–2	Tranmere Rovers	Crewe
15:00 GMT	Ainley 20', 51'; Kirk 67'	Report	Norwood 36'; Banks 83'	Stadium: Gresty Road; Attendance: 5,154; Referee: Carl Boyeson

24 November 2018 19	Crawley Town	3–0	Crewe Alexandra	Crawley
15:00 GMT	Payne 15' (pen.); McNerney 81'; Bulman 90+5'	Report		Stadium: Broadfield Stadium; Attendance: 1,734; Referee: Lee Collins

27 November 2018 20	Crewe Alexandra	2–0	Cambridge United	Crewe
19:45 GMT	Ainley 34'; Miller 86'	Report		Stadium: Gresty Road; Attendance: 2,569; Referee: Tom Nield

8 December 2018 21	Crewe Alexandra	0–2	Oldham Athletic	Crewe
15:00 GMT		Report	Clarke 17'; O'Grady 40'	Stadium: Gresty Road; Attendance: 4,168; Referee: Brett Huxtable

15 December 2018 22	Exeter City	1–0	Crewe Alexandra	Exeter
15:00 GMT	Martin 42'; Taylor (yellow card) 90+2'	Report	Jones (yellow card) 11'; Ray (yellow card) 71'; Dale (yellow card) 90'	Stadium: St James Park; Attendance: 3,505; Referee: Craig Hicks

22 December 2018 23	Forest Green Rovers	1–0	Crewe Alexandra	Nailsworth
15:00 GMT	Mills 45'; Montgomery (yellow card) 55'; Rawson (yellow card) 87'; Campbell (yellow card) 89'	Report	Jones (yellow card) 90+2'	Stadium: The New Lawn; Attendance: 2,388; Referee: Matt Donohue

26 December 2018 24	Crewe Alexandra	2–1	Lincoln City	Crewe
15:00 GMT	Porter 47'; Green (yellow card) 60'; Jones 72'; Wintle (yellow card) 83'	Report	Bostwick (yellow card) 51'; Akinde (yellow card) 61'; Shackell (yellow card) 90+1'; Anderson 90+7'; Rhead (yellow card) 90+8'	Stadium: Gresty Road; Attendance: 4,440; Referee: Chris Sarginson

29 December 2018 25	Crewe Alexandra	1–0	Stevenage	Crewe
15:00 GMT	Porter 21' (pen.); Ray (yellow card) 60'	Report	Guthrie (yellow card) 74'; Reid (red card) 79'; Kennedy (yellow card) 79'	Stadium: Gresty Road; Attendance: 3,625; Referee: Anthony Backhouse

1 January 2019 26	Bury	3–1	Crewe Alexandra	Bury
15:00 GMT	O'Shea (yellow card) 39' (goal) 58' (pen.), 76'; Lavery 50'; Styles (yellow card) 62'	Report	Porter 3'; Ray (yellow card) 61'	Stadium: Gigg Lane; Attendance: 3,812; Referee: Seb Stockbridge

5 January 2019 27	Morecambe	2–2	Crewe Alexandra	Morecambe
15:00 GMT	Oates (yellow card) 55'; Tutte 63'; Mandeville (yellow card) 75'; Ellison 84'; Cranston (yellow card) 90+2'	Report	Jones 27'; Porter 90+4' (pen.)	Stadium: Globe Arena; Attendance: 1,662; Referee: Carl Boyeson

12 January 2019 28	Crewe Alexandra	3–2	Newport County	Crewe
15:00 GMT	Bowery 34'; Ray (yellow card) 69'; Porter 88' (pen.); Ainley 90+2'	Report	Semenyo 65' (yellow card) 74'; Matt (yellow card) 72'; Amond 76'	Stadium: Gresty Road; Attendance: 3,104; Referee: Nick Kinseley

19 January 2019 29	Milton Keynes Dons	0–1	Crewe Alexandra	Denbigh
15:00 GMT	Cargill (yellow card) 42'; Agard (yellow card) 45+2'	Report	Kirk 32'; Jones (yellow card) 43'; Garratt (yellow card) 81'	Stadium: Stadium mk Attendance: 8,347; Referee: Andy Haines

26 January 2019 30	Crewe Alexandra	2–1	Colchester United	Crewe
15:00 GMT	Kirk 48' (yellow card) 79'; Wintle (yellow card) 54'; Nolan 87'	Report	Szmodics 11' (yellow card) 80'; Nouble (yellow card) 42'	Stadium: Gresty Road; Attendance: 3,306; Referee: Peter Wright

9 February 2019 31	Macclesfield Town	3–3	Crewe Alexandra	Macclesfield
15:00 GMT	Wilson 15'; O'Hara (yellow card) 32'; Smith (yellow card) 66'; Cameron 74'; Cole 90+7'	Report	Bowery 3'; Porter 32' (pen.); Ray (yellow card) 84' (goal) 90+5'	Stadium: Moss Rose; Attendance: 3,772; Referee: Geoff Eltringham

12 February 2019 32	Crewe Alexandra	2–1	Carlisle United	Crewe
19:45 GMT	Porter 3'; Ng (yellow card) 31'; Ray (yellow card) 44'; Miller 73'	Report	Devitt (red card) 18'; Miller 29'; O'Hare (yellow card) 34'; Hope (yellow card) 65'; Grainger (yellow card) 72'; Cullen (yellow card) 90+2'	Stadium: Gresty Road; Attendance: 3,476; Referee: Paul Marsden

16 February 2019 33	Oldham Athletic	1–1	Crewe Alexandra	Oldham
15:00 GMT	Lang 23'; Branger (yellow card) 72'	Report	Ray (yellow card) 22' (goal) 90+3'; Pickering (yellow card) 43'; Kirk (yellow card) 73'	Stadium: Boundary Park; Attendance: 5,288; Referee: Graham Salisbury

23 February 2019 34	Crewe Alexandra	1–2	Exeter City	Crewe
15:00 GMT	Porter 48'	Report	Taylor 7'; Jay 66'; Holmes (yellow card) 79'	Stadium: Gresty Road; Attendance: 3,841; Referee: Dean Whitestone

2 March 2019 35	Crewe Alexandra	0–2	Northampton Town	Crewe
15:00 GMT	Ray (yellow card) 83'	Report	Powell 28'; O'Toole 32'; Goode (yellow card) 71'; Hoskins (yellow card) 90'	Stadium: Gresty Road; Attendance: 4,096; Referee: Lee Collins

8 March 2019 36	Tranmere Rovers	1–0	Crewe Alexandra	Birkenhead
19:45 GMT	Perkins (yellow card) 25'; Jennings (yellow card) 69'; Norwood 72'	Report		Stadium: Prenton Park; Referee: Martin Coy

12 March 2019 37	Cambridge United	0–0	Crewe Alexandra	Cambridge
19:45 GMT	Taft (yellow card) 65'	Report	Pickering (yellow card) 62'; Ray (yellow card) 67'; Green (yellow card) 78'	Stadium: Abbey Stadium; Attendance: 3,448; Referee: Charles Breakspear

16 March 2019 38	Crewe Alexandra	6–1	Crawley Town	Crewe
15:00 GMT	Bowery 36'; Dallison 38' (o.g.); Porter 42'; Green 43'; Kirk 47'; Hunt (yellow card) 79'; Dale 83'	Report	Palmer 13' (pen.); Meite (red card) 80'	Stadium: Gresty Road; Attendance: 3,220; Referee: Sebastian Stockbridge

23 March 2019 39	Mansfield Town	1–2	Crewe Alexandra	Mansfield
15:00 GMT	Mellis (yellow card) 40'; Bishop (yellow card) 50'; Preston (yellow card) 57'; Pearce (yellow card) 59' (goal) 90+2'	Report	Ng (yellow card) 35'; Green (yellow card) 50'; Nolan (yellow card) 58'; Taylor-Sinclair (yellow card) 67'; Ainley 71', 84'; Garratt (yellow card) 90+3'	Stadium: Field Mill; Attendance: 4,675; Referee: Thomas Bramall

30 March 2019 40	Crewe Alexandra	1–3	Cheltenham Town	Crewe
15:00 GMT	Ray (yellow card) 27' (red card) 53'; Taylor-Sinclair 34'; Ng (yellow card) 45+1'; Miller (yellow card) 90+6'	Report	Dawson 45+1'; Waters 74'; Varney 83' (yellow card) 90+6'	Stadium: Gresty Road; Attendance: 3,495; Referee: Trevor Kettle

6 April 2019 41	Port Vale	1–0	Crewe Alexandra	Burslem
15:00 BST	Miller (yellow card) 41'; Montaño (yellow card) 77'; Pope 78'	Report	Hunt (yellow card) 47'; Porter (yellow card) 74'	Stadium: Vale Park; Attendance: 6,823; Referee: Andy Davies

13 April 2019 42	Crewe Alexandra	3–0	Notts County	Crewe
15:00 BST	Taylor-Sinclair 31'; Wintle 77'; Jones 83'	Report	Hemmings (yellow card) 43'; O'Brien (yellow card) 85'	Stadium: Gresty Road; Attendance: 4,316; Referee: Matt Donohue

19 April 2019 43	Crewe Alexandra	2–0	Yeovil Town	Crewe
15:00 BST	Kirk 4'; Lowery 65'	Report	Abrahams (yellow card) 55'; Gafaiti (red card) 58'	Stadium: Gresty Road; Attendance: 3,410; Referee: Eddie Ilderton

22 April 2019 44	Swindon Town	1–2	Crewe Alexandra	Swindon
15:00 BST	Dunne (yellow card) 34'; Doughty 63' (pen.); Woolfenden (yellow card) 90+5'	Report	Porter 3', 45+1' (yellow card) 66'; Green (yellow card) 58'; Wintle (yellow card) 62'; Kirk (yellow card) 68'; Lowery (yellow card) 89'; Hunt (yellow card) 90+6'	Stadium: County Ground; Attendance: 6,107; Referee: Lee Collins

27 April 2019 45	Crewe Alexandra	4–3	Forest Green Rovers	Crewe
15:00 BST	Porter 19'; Mills 63' (o.g.); Hunt (yellow card) 81'; Kirk 87', 89' (yellow card) 90'	Report	Brown 36' (yellow card) 61'; Mondal 47'; Gunning (yellow card) 52'; Doidge 52'; Mills (yellow card) 89'; Reid (yellow card) 90+5'	Stadium: Gresty Road; Attendance: 3,906; Referee: Graham Salisbury

4 May 2019 46	Grimsby Town	2–0	Crewe Alexandra	Cleethorpes
12:30 BST	Davis 26'; Grayson 34'; Wright (yellow card) 62'	Report	Sass-Davies (yellow card) 12'; Ng (yellow card) 19'	Stadium: Blundell Park; Attendance: 4,248; Referee: Craig Hicks

=== FA Cup ===
The first round draw was made live on BBC by Dennis Wise and Dion Dublin on 22 October.

10 November 2018 First round	Crewe Alexandra	0–1	Carlisle United	Crewe
15:00 GMT		Report	Devitt 90'	Stadium: Gresty Road; Attendance: 2,467; Referee: Lee Swabey

=== EFL Cup ===
On 15 June 2018, the draw for the first round was made in Vietnam.

14 August 2018 First round	Crewe Alexandra	1–1 (3–4 p)	Fleetwood Town	Crewe
19:45 BST	Wintle 32'	Report	Holt 52'	Stadium: Gresty Road; Attendance: 1,783; Referee: Trevor Kettle
	Penalties
	Jones (penalty missed); Nicholls (penalty scored); Reilly (penalty scored); Pickering (penalty scored); Ng (penalty missed)		Madden (penalty scored); Long (penalty scored); Holt (penalty scored); Biggins (penalty missed); Hunter (penalty scored)

=== EFL Trophy ===
On 13 July 2018, the initial group stage draw bar the U21 invited clubs was announced.

Pos	Lge	Team	Pld	W	PW	PL	L	GF	GA	GD	Pts	Qualification
1	L1	Shrewsbury Town	3	2	1	0	0	9	2	+7	8	Round 2
2	ACA	Manchester City U21	3	2	0	1	0	6	2	+4	7	Round 2
3	L2	Crewe Alexandra	3	1	0	0	2	6	9	−3	3	
4	L2	Tranmere Rovers	3	0	0	0	3	3	11	−8	0	

Source: EFL.com

4 September 2018 Group stages	Tranmere Rovers	3–4	Crewe Alexandra	Birkenhead
19:45 BST	Harris 45+4'; Stockton 45+10'; Mullin 46'	Report	20'; Nicholls 73'; Porter 85'; Jones 86'	Stadium: Prenton Park; Referee: Graham Salisbury

25 September 2018 Group stages	Crewe Alexandra	1–4	Manchester City U21	Crewe
19:30 BST	Nicholls 51'	Report	Dele-Bashiru 2'; Gonzalez 22'; Richards 78' (pen.); Ogunby 90'	Stadium: Gresty Road; Attendance: 810

13 November 2018 Group stages	Crewe Alexandra	1–2	Shrewsbury Town	Crewe
19:30 GMT	Bowery 79'	Report	Ray 20' (o.g.); Gilliead 63'	Stadium: Gresty Road; Attendance: 1,009

== Transfers ==
=== Transfers in ===
Date from	Position	Nationality	Name	From	Fee	Ref.
1 July 2018	CM	(Republic of Ireland)	Paul Green	Oldham Athletic	Free transfer	
1 July 2018	CF	(England)	Shaun Miller	Carlisle United	Free transfer	
6 July 2018	RW	(England)	Alex Nicholls	Barnet	Free transfer	
31 July 2018	RB	(England)	Nicky Hunt	Notts County	Free transfer	

=== Transfers out ===
Date from	Position	Nationality	Name	To	Fee	Ref.
1 July 2018	LB	(Ivory Coast)	Zoumana Bakayogo	Tranmere Rovers	Released	
1 July 2018	CF	(England)	Chris Dagnall	Bury	Released	
1 July 2018	ST	(England)	George Nunn	Chelsea	£300,000	
1 July 2018	CF	(Nigeria)	Daniel Udoh	AFC Telford United	Released	
1 July 2018	RB	(Scotland)	Ross Woodcock	Free agent	Released	
24 July 2018	GK	(England)	William Appleyard	Stevenage	Free transfer	
9 January 2019	CM	(England)	Brad Walker	Shrewsbury Town	Undisclosed	

=== Loans in ===
Start date	Position	Nationality	Name	From	End date	Ref.
29 August 2018	LB	(Republic of Ireland)	Kevin O'Connor	Preston North End	7 January 2019	
31 August 2018	CB	(Republic of Ireland)	Corey Whelan	Liverpool	7 January 2019	
26 January 2019	RB	(England)	Jamie Sterry	Newcastle United	March 2019	
30 January 2019	LB	(Scotland)	Aaron Taylor-Sinclair	(Scotland) Motherwell	31 May 2019	

=== Loans out ===
Start date	Position	Nationality	Name	To	End date	Ref.
16 August 2018	GK	(Finland)	Will Jääskeläinen	Nantwich Town	September 2018	
24 August 2018	CF	(England)	Owen Dale	Altrincham	November 2018	
30 August 2018	CM	(England)	Brad Walker	(Wales) Wrexham	7 January 2019	
9 November 2018	CF	(England)	Lewis Reilly	Halesowen Town	9 December 2018	
21 November 2018	GK	(Finland)	Will Jääskeläinen	Nantwich Town	December 2018	
December 2018	CM	(England)	Josh Lundstram	Kidsgrove Athletic	January 2019	
4 January 2019	CF	(England)	Lewis Reilly	Curzon Ashton	11 April 2019	
11 January 2019	CB	(Wales)	Billy Sass-Davies	FC United of Manchester	February 2019	
17 January 2019	CM	(England)	Josh Lundstram	Nuneaton Borough	February 2019	
18 January 2019	CB	(England)	Michael Raynes	Hartlepool United	31 May 2019	
20 February 2019	CM	(England)	Luke Offord	Witton Albion	March 2019	
8 March 2019	CB	(Wales)	Billy Sass-Davies	Altrincham	11 April 2019	
