= Perry Ng =

English footballer (born 1996)

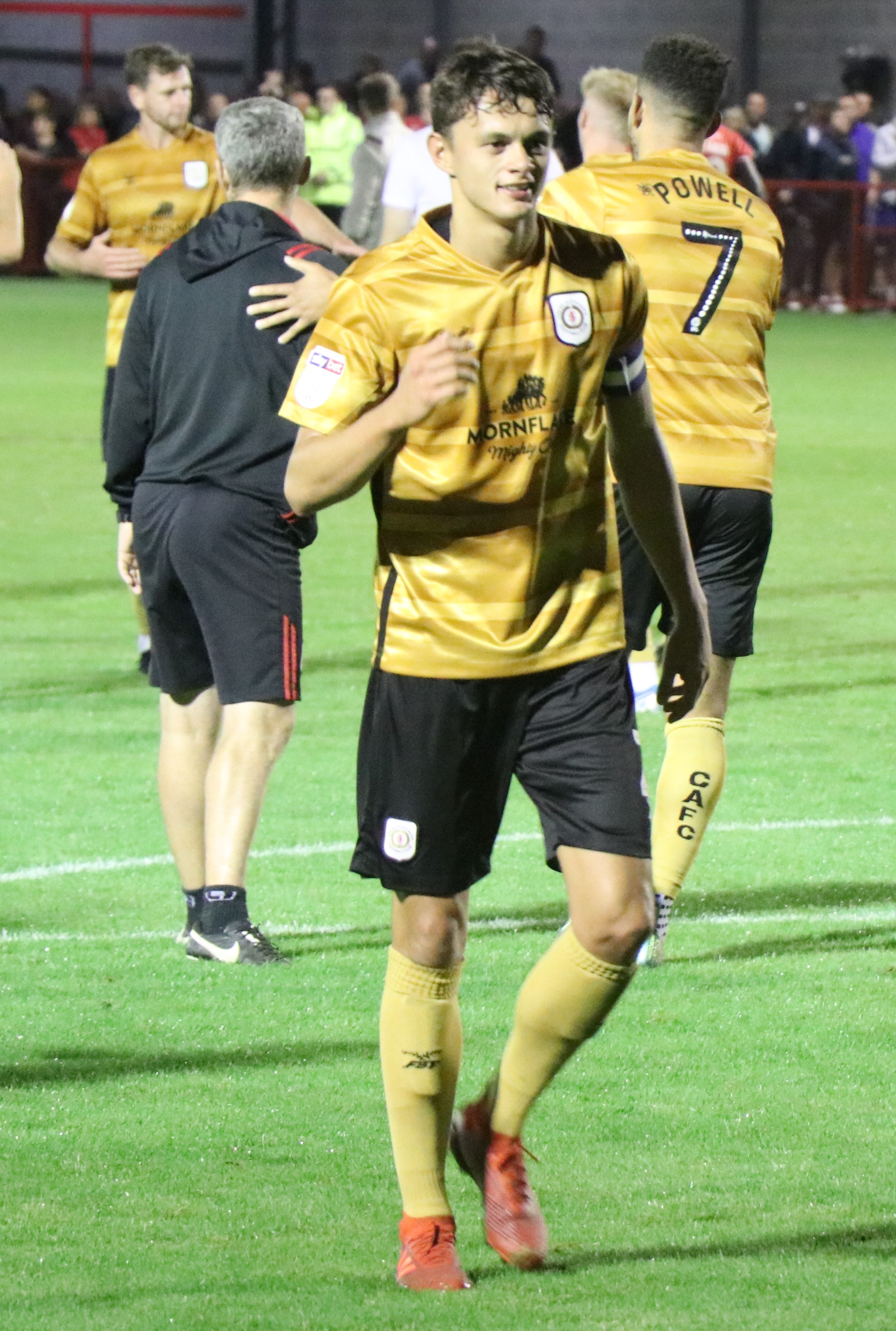
- Ng playing for Crewe Alexandra in 2019

Personal information
- Full name: Perry Tian Hee Ng
- Date of birth: 24 June 1996 (age 30)
- Place of birth: Liverpool, England
- Height: 5 ft 11 in (1.80 m)
- Positions: Full-back; centre-back

Team information
- Current team: Cardiff City
- Number: 38

Youth career
- 2004–2014: Crewe Alexandra

Senior career*
Years	Team	Apps	(Gls)
2014–2021	Crewe Alexandra	155	(7)
2015	→ Hyde United (loan)	13	(1)
2021–	Cardiff City	224	(16)
- * Club domestic league appearances and goals as of 8 November 2026 (UTC)

Perry Tian Hee Ng (/ˈɛnˈdʒiː/) (born 24 June 1996) is a professional footballer who plays either as a full-back or centre-back for EFL Championship club Cardiff City. Born in England, he is eligible to play for the Singapore national team.

Ng made his professional debut for Crewe Alexandra in 2015, after a loan at Hyde United, and made 182 appearances for Crewe before joining Cardiff City in January 2021 where he won two consecutive 'Player of the season' awards, in the 2022–23 and 2023–24 campaigns.

== Club career ==
=== Crewe Alexandra ===
Born in Liverpool, Ng was in Crewe Alexandra's youth system for ten years before signing his first professional contract for two years on 14 May 2014. On 1 November 2014, he had his first inclusion in a matchday squad, remaining an unused substitute in a 1–1 draw at Crawley Town in League One.

On 30 January 2015, Ng was loaned for a month to Hyde United of the Conference North. He made his senior debut on 7 February, playing the full 90 minutes of a 1–3 home loss to Boston United. Ng twice extended his loan for the struggling team, eventually for the remainder of the season. He totalled 13 appearances, all starts, as they ended the season bottom of the table, and scored his first senior goal on 14 March, a last-minute equaliser in a 1–1 draw with Harrogate Town at Ewen Fields.

On 27 November 2015, Ng made his debut for Crewe, coming on in added time in place of Ryan Colclough in a 1–0 win over Oldham Athletic at Gresty Road. He made Crewe's starting XI for the first time on 5 May 2016 against Burton Albion at Gresty Road.

On 22 May 2017, Ng signed a new one-year deal, including an option for a further 12 months depending on appearances. He was sent off for two bookings in 17 minutes on 12 August in a 1–1 home draw with Newport County. Four weeks later, on 9 September 2017, he scored his first Crewe goal in a 5–1 win over Chesterfield at Gresty Road.

On 3 January 2018, Ng was retrospectively suspended for four games following an off-the-ball clash with Cambridge United's Jabo Ibehre in a match at the Abbey Stadium on 30 December 2017. Ng's left-footed strike at Stevenage on 10 March 2018 was named the League Two Goal of the Month winner for March.

Ng was Crewe's Player of the Year and Players' Player of the Year for 2018–19, with manager David Artell praising his consistency despite not scoring a goal all season. The following season (2019–20), Ng helped Crewe to automatic promotion to EFL League One in a campaign shortened due to the COVID-19 pandemic, and was widely selected by regional football journalists in their "League Two team of the season (so far)". In September 2020, he (along with Crewe team-mate Charlie Kirk) was named in the PFA League Two Team of the Year for the 2019–20 season.

Ng was suspended for six matches following a breach of FA Rule E1 (spitting) after an FA Cup tie at Cheltenham Town on 28 November 2020.

=== Cardiff City ===
In early January 2021, Artell rejected an initial offer for Ng, reportedly £250,000, from Championship side Cardiff City. On 19 January, the transfer, for an undisclosed fee, was confirmed; the BBC reported Cardiff would pay Crewe an initial £350,000, which could rise to £500,000, and would keep the player until the summer of 2024. He made his debut the next day in a 1–0 home defeat against Queens Park Rangers.

Ng was sent off after receiving two yellow cards in Cardiff's opening game of the 2022–23 season, a 1–0 home victory against Norwich City on 30 July 2022. He scored his first goal for the club on 13 September in a 3–2 win at Middlesbrough. In December 2022, Blackpool striker Gary Madine was accused of deliberately stamping on Ng, but faced no FA action as he had been cautioned by the referee. On 4 March 2023, after Cardiff goalkeeper Ryan Allsop was sent off in the 90th minute of their match against Bristol City, Ng took over in goal for the final minutes, keeping a clean sheet. Ng was Cardiff's 'Player of the Year' and Players' Player of the Year for the 2022–23 campaign.

On 24 August 2023, Ng signed a new three-year deal to keep him at Cardiff until the summer of 2026. Ng's performances throughout the 2023–24 season again earned him Cardiff's 'Player of the Year' and 'Players' Player of the Year' awards; he was Cardiff's top scorer with six goals and manager Erol Bulut said he expected offers from other clubs. However, he remained at the club, but Cardiff were relegated to League One at the end of the 2024–25 season, during which Ng made 37 appearances, scoring once (Cardiff were winless after seven matches, but in the eighth game Ng scored the only goal in the side's 1–0 home victory over Millwall on 1 October 2024).

Ng suffered a knee injury during the summer 2025 pre-season period, but returned to the first team action in late August 2025.

On 15 May 2026, Perry signed a new two-year deal to keep him at Cardiff until the summer of 2028.

== International career ==
Ng is eligible for the Singapore national team through his paternal grandfather. He told FourFourTwo in May 2017 that he wanted to represent them and had been contacted by the Football Association of Singapore. In October 2023, Ng announced in a BBC interview, that he has been working to get his Singaporean citizenship, meaning he would need to give up his British passport, due to Singapore's dual-citizenship law.

On 2 September 2024, and prior to applying for Singaporean citizenship, Ng, alongside Japan-born Kyoga Nakamura, was called up to the Singapore national team centralised training camp. On 6 February 2025, the Football Association of Singapore general secretary Chew Chun-Liang announced that Ng would be applying for Singapore citizenship through the Foreign Sports Talent Scheme. During the March 2025 international window, Ng travelled to Singapore on 18 March to train with the Lions. Ng received his Singapore permanent residency on 21 March 2025, taking him a step closer to joining the Singapore national team. In August 2026, Ng said he was "getting closer" to Singaporean citizenship. In September 2026, Ng received his Singaporean citizenship. As Singapore do not permit multiple citizenships in adulthood, Ng had relinquished his British citizenship in the process.

== Career statistics ==
As of match played 2 September 2026

Appearances and goals by club, season and competition
Club	Season	League			FA Cup		EFL Cup		Other		Total	
Club	Season	Division	Apps	Goals	Apps	Goals	Apps	Goals	Apps	Goals	Apps	Goals
Crewe Alexandra	2015–16	League One	6	0	0	0	0	0	0	0	6	0
Crewe Alexandra	2016–17	League Two	16	0	2	0	1	0	1 (Note: Appearance(s) in EFL Trophy)	0	20	0
Crewe Alexandra	2017–18	League Two	38	4	3	0	1	0	1	0	43	4
Crewe Alexandra	2018–19	League Two	44	0	1	0	1	0	3	0	49	0
Crewe Alexandra	2019–20	League Two	36	2	4	0	2	0	3	0	45	2
Crewe Alexandra	2020–21	League One	15	1	2	0	1	0	1	0	19	1
Crewe Alexandra	Total		155	7	12	0	6	0	9	0	182	7
Hyde United (loan)	2014–15	Conference North	13	1	0	0	–		–		13	1
Cardiff City	2020–21	Championship	19	0	0	0	0	0	–		19	0
Cardiff City	2021–22	Championship	39	0	2	0	1	0	–		42	0
Cardiff City	2022–23	Championship	43	2	1	0	0	0	–		44	2
Cardiff City	2023–24	Championship	39	6	1	0	1	0	–		41	6
Cardiff City	2024–25	Championship	35	1	2	0	0	0	–		37	1
Cardiff City	2025–26	League One	35	6	0	0	4	0	1	0	40	6
Cardiff City	2026–27	Championship	4	1	0	0	2	0	–		6	1
Cardiff City	Total		214	16	6	0	8	0	1	0	229	16
Career total			382	24	18	0	13	0	10	0	424	24

== Honours ==
Individual

- PFA Team of the Year: 2019–20 League Two, 2025–26 League One
- Crewe Alexandra Player of the Year: 2018–19
- Cardiff City Player of the Year: 2022–23, 2023–24
