= Charlie Kirk (footballer) =

English footballer (born 1997)

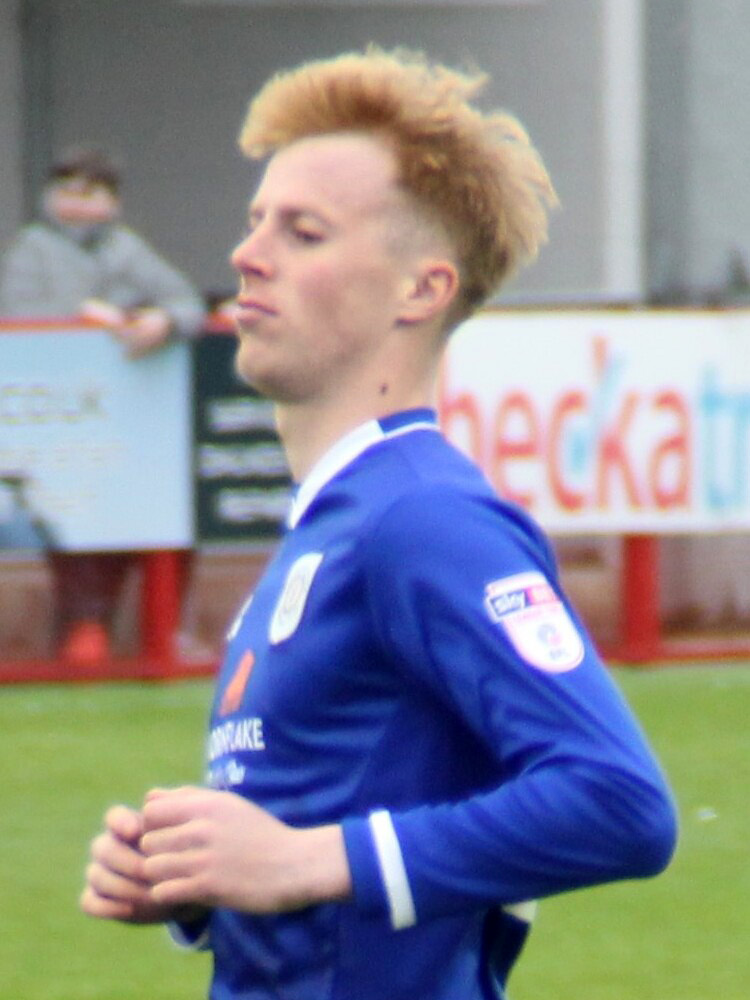
- Kirk in 2018

Personal information
- Full name: Charlie David Kirk
- Date of birth: 24 December 1997 (age 28)
- Place of birth: Winsford, England
- Height: 1.85 m (6 ft 1 in)
- Position: Winger

Team information
- Current team: Altrincham
- Number: 23

Youth career
- –2016: Crewe Alexandra

Senior career*
Years	Team	Apps	(Gls)
2016–2021	Crewe Alexandra	181	(29)
2021–2023	Charlton Athletic	33	(3)
2022	→ Blackpool (loan)	9	(0)
2023	→ Burton Albion (loan)	14	(2)
2024	Crewe Alexandra	14	(0)
2024–2025	Barrow	7	(0)
2025–	Altrincham	37	(2)
- * Club domestic league appearances and goals as of 17:10, 25 April 2026 (UTC)

Charlie David Kirk (born 24 December 1997) is an English professional footballer who plays as a winger for National League club Altrincham.

== Early life ==
Charlie David Kirk was born in Winsford, England, on 24 December 1997.

== Playing career ==
=== Crewe Alexandra (first spell) ===
Kirk came through the Crewe Alexandra Academy, earning a call-up to the senior team whilst still a second year scholar. He made his debut in the Football League on 16 February 2016, in a 2–2 draw with Rochdale at Spotland, coming on as an 88th-minute substitute for Callum Saunders. He scored his first Crewe goal on 26 December 2017, the second in a 2–0 win at Chesterfield.

In May 2018, after making 69 appearances and scoring five goals, Kirk signed a new three-year deal with Crewe through to summer 2021. The following season, he scored 11 goals in 45 first-team appearances.

After helping Crewe win promotion to League One in 2020, scoring nine goals and providing more assists than any other League Two player, Kirk signed a new two-year deal with the club through to June 2022. In September 2020, Kirk (along with Crewe team-mate Perry Ng) was named in the PFA League Two Team of the Year for the 2019–20 season.

=== Charlton Athletic ===
On 12 August 2021, Kirk was announced to have joined fellow League One side Charlton Athletic for an undisclosed fee on a four-year deal; Charlton had triggered a £500,000 release clause in his Crewe contract; Kirk later said: "I didn't just want to leave and for them [Crewe] not to get anything for me."

He made his Charlton debut in the club's 2–1 defeat at Milton Keynes Dons on 17 August and two games later played in the club's first win of the season, 2–0 against former club Crewe Alexandra, on 28 August 2021.

Playing in all of Charlton's opening games of the 2022–23 season, Kirk scored his first Charlton goal in the fifth match, a 5–1 League One defeat of Plymouth Argyle at The Valley on 16 August 2022. He later scored twice in Charlton's 3–3 League One draw at Burton Albion on 12 November 2022.

On 20 December 2023, Kirk's contract with Charlton Athletic was cancelled by mutual consent.

==== Blackpool (loan) ====
On 27 January 2022, Kirk joined Blackpool on loan for the rest of the 2021–22 season with a view to a permanent transfer. He made his Blackpool debut on 5 February 2022, coming on as a second-half substitute for CJ Hamilton in a 3–1 victory over Bristol City at Bloomfield Road.

==== Burton Albion (loan) ====
On 31 January 2023, Kirk joined Burton Albion on loan for the rest of the 2022–23 season, and made his debut as an 82nd-minute substitute and scored the 96th-minute winner in Burton's 3–2 win at Fleetwood Town on 4 February 2023.

=== Crewe Alexandra (second spell) ===
On 1 February 2024, Kirk returned to Crewe Alexandra on a deal until the end of the 2023–24 season, and made his second Crewe debut two days later, coming on as a 91st-minute substitute in Crewe's goal-less draw at Tranmere Rovers. Kirk was released by Crewe at the end of the 2023–24 season.

=== Barrow ===
On 22 October 2024, Kirk joined League Two side Barrow on a contract until the end of the season with the option for a further year. He made his Barrow debut as a second-half substitute in the side's FA Cup first round defeat by Doncaster Rovers at Holker Street on 2 November 2024. Kirk was released by Barrow at the end of the season.

=== Altrincham ===
On 29 July 2025, following a successful trial period, Kirk joined National League side Altrincham. He was offered - and accepted - a new contract at Altrincham at the end of the 2025–2026 season.

== Career statistics ==
As of match played 25 April 2026

Appearances and goals by club, season and competition
Club	Season	League			FA Cup		League Cup		Other		Total	
Club	Season	Division	Apps	Goals	Apps	Goals	Apps	Goals	Apps	Goals	Apps	Goals
Crewe Alexandra	2015–16	League One	14	0	0	0	0	0	0	0	14	0
Crewe Alexandra	2016–17	League Two	22	0	0	0	1	0	3 (Note: Appearances in EFL Trophy)	0	26	0
Crewe Alexandra	2017–18	League Two	25	5	1	0	0	0	3	0	29	5
Crewe Alexandra	2018–19	League Two	42	11	1	0	1	0	1	0	45	11
Crewe Alexandra	2019–20	League Two	36	7	4	1	2	1	2	0	44	9
Crewe Alexandra	2020–21	League One	42	6	2	1	1	0	3	0	48	7
Crewe Alexandra	Total		181	29	8	2	5	1	12	0	206	32
Charlton Athletic	2021–22	League One	8	0	2	0	0	0	4	0	14	0
Charlton Athletic	2022–23	League One	21	3	2	0	3	0	0	0	26	3
Charlton Athletic	2023–24	League One	4	0	1	0	1	0	2	1	8	1
Charlton Athletic	Total		33	3	5	0	4	0	6	1	48	4
Blackpool (loan)	2021–22	Championship	9	0	0	0	0	0	0	0	9	0
Burton Albion (loan)	2022–23	League One	14	2	0	0	0	0	0	0	14	2
Crewe Alexandra	2023–24	League Two	14	0	0	0	0	0	2 (Note: Appearances in League Two play-offs)	0	16	0
Barrow	2024–25	League Two	7	0	1	0	0	0	1	0	9	0
Altrincham	2025–26	National League	37	0	1	0	0	0	0	0	38	0
Career total			295	34	15	2	9	1	21	1	340	38

== Honours ==
Individual

- PFA Team of the Year: 2019–20 League Two
