= Callum Ainley =

English footballer (born 1997)

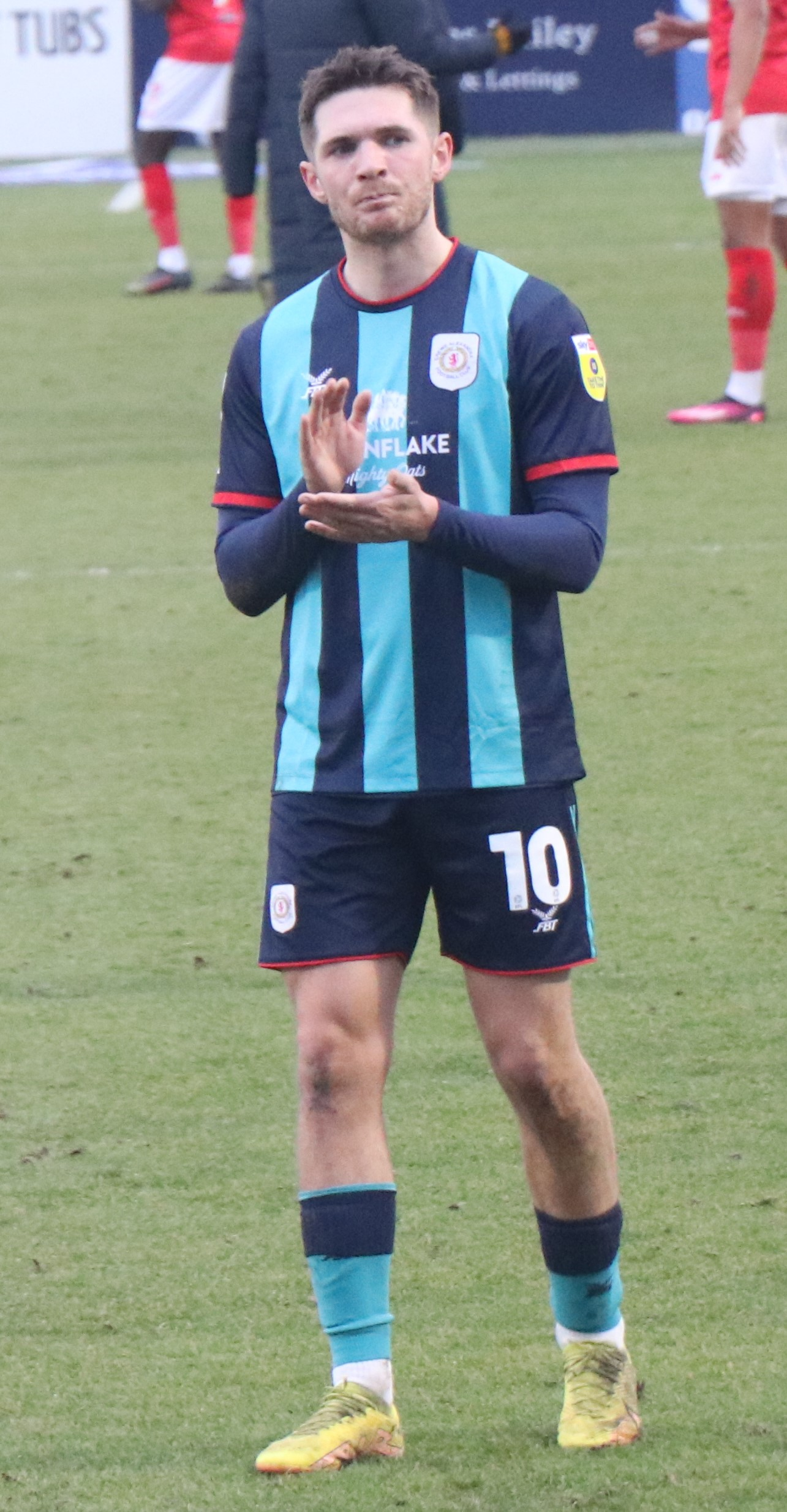
- Ainley with Crewe Alexandra in 2023

Personal information
- Full name: Callum Thomas Ainley
- Date of birth: 2 November 1997 (age 29)
- Place of birth: Swindon, England
- Height: 1.73 m (5 ft 8 in)
- Position: Midfielder

Team information
- Current team: Cleethorpes Town

Youth career
- 2011–2015: Crewe Alexandra

Senior career*
Years	Team	Apps	(Gls)
2015–2023	Crewe Alexandra	242	(17)
2023–2025	Grimsby Town	33	(0)
2025–	Cleethorpes Town	26	(2)
- * Club domestic league appearances and goals as of 11:38, 7 April 2026 (UTC)

Callum Thomas Ainley (born 2 November 1997) is an English professional footballer who plays as a midfielder for Cleethorpes Town.

== Career ==
=== Crewe Alexandra ===
Ainley began his career in Crewe Alexandra's academy and made his professional debut, aged 17, on 5 September 2015 in a 3–1 defeat against Swindon Town. He scored his first goal for Crewe in a 3–1 win against Doncaster Rovers on 30 April 2016. Exactly four months later, he scored his second senior goal in a 3–0 win at Accrington Stanley in a Football League Trophy tie on 30 August 2016. Two days after his 20th birthday, on 4 November 2017, he scored the 89th-minute winner in a 2–1 victory over Rotherham United in the FA Cup first round at Gresty Road.

On 3 May 2018, Ainley signed a new three-year contract at Crewe.

In December 2020, Ainley had surgery to repair a hamstring injury sustained in an FA Cup tie at Cheltenham Town. He returned to first team action on 14 March 2021, coming on as a second-half substitute against Burton Albion. He scored his first goal of the season in a 1–0 win at Bristol Rovers on 1 May 2021, and Crewe manager David Artell was keen to get him to sign a new contract. On 13 May 2021, Crewe announced that it had offered Ainley a new contract, and Ainley signed a two-year deal on 30 June 2021.

On 25 September 2021 at Rotherham United, Ainley suffered a new hamstring injury ruling him out of first team action for two months. He returned to the side on 1 December, playing the first half of Crewe's 2–0 win over Doncaster Rovers in the Football League Trophy, and played a total of 36 games as Crewe were relegated from League One.

After suffering a shoulder injury during a League Two game against Mansfield Town at Gresty Road on 24 September 2022, Ainley required surgery and was ruled out for around three months. He resumed first-team appearances coming on as a substitute in Crewe's goalless draw with AFC Wimbledon on 7 January 2023. Eighteen months after his last Crewe goal, against Hartlepool United in the EFL Cup in August 2021, Ainley scored the opener in Crewe's 2–0 League Two win over the same opposition on 14 February 2023.

On 12 May 2023, the club announced Ainley's departure after making 278 first-team appearances. Manager Lee Bell said "it's time for him to try something else. ... I've no doubt that in six months he will be settled and pleased with the way things have worked out. Callum will always be welcome at Crewe Alexandra."

=== Grimsby Town ===
After leaving Crewe Alexandra in the summer of 2023, Ainley signed for League Two side Grimsby Town on a one-year deal in September 2023. He made his Grimsby debut in a 3–0 league defeat at Wrexham on 16 September 2023, coming on as a 71st-minute substitute for Gavan Holohan.

In January 2024, Grimsby announced that Ainley had been diagnosed with thyroid cancer, and that after having surgery he could return to training in the second half of February. He made his first Grimsby appearance since the diagnosis, being brought on as a late substitute by Grimsby's former Crewe manager David Artell in a 3–0 win at Crewe on 13 April 2024. Ainley agreed a new one-year contract with Grimsby in June 2024. In May 2025, Grimsby announced Ainley would be leaving the club.

=== Cleethorpes Town ===
Remaining in the Grimsby area, Ainley signed for local Northern Premier League Premier Division side Cleethorpes Town on 2 September 2025.

== Career statistics ==
As of 7 April 2026

Appearances and goals by club, season and competition
Club	Season	Division	League		FA Cup		League Cup		Other		Total	
Club	Season	Division	Apps	Goals	Apps	Goals	Apps	Goals	Apps	Goals	Apps	Goals
Crewe Alexandra	2015–16	League One	16	1	0	0	0	0	1 (Note: Appearance in Football League Trophy)	0	17	1
Crewe Alexandra	2016–17	League Two	27	1	1	0	0	0	3 (Note: Appearance(s) in EFL Trophy)	1	31	2
Crewe Alexandra	2017–18	League Two	45	4	3	1	1	0	3	0	52	5
Crewe Alexandra	2018–19	League Two	43	6	1	0	1	0	3	0	48	6
Crewe Alexandra	2019–20	League Two	25	2	1	0	2	0	3	1	31	3
Crewe Alexandra	2020–21	League One	22	1	2	0	1	0	3	0	28	1
Crewe Alexandra	2021–22	League One	31	0	0	0	2	1	3	0	36	1
Crewe Alexandra	2022–23	League Two	33	2	0	0	1	0	1	0	35	2
Crewe Alexandra	Total		242	17	8	1	8	1	20	2	278	21
Grimsby Town	2023–24	League Two	7	0	2	0	0	0	0	0	9	0
Grimsby Town	2024–25	League Two	26	0	1	0	2	0	3	0	32	0
Grimsby Town	Total		33	0	3	0	2	0	3	0	41	0
Cleethorpes Town	2025–26	NPL Premier Division	25	2	0	0	0	0	1 (Note: Appearance in Lincolnshire Senior Cup)	0	26	2
Career total			301	19	11	1	10	1	24	2	341	23

== Honours ==
Crewe Alexandra

- EFL League Two runner-up: 2019–20
