= Ben Garratt =

English footballer

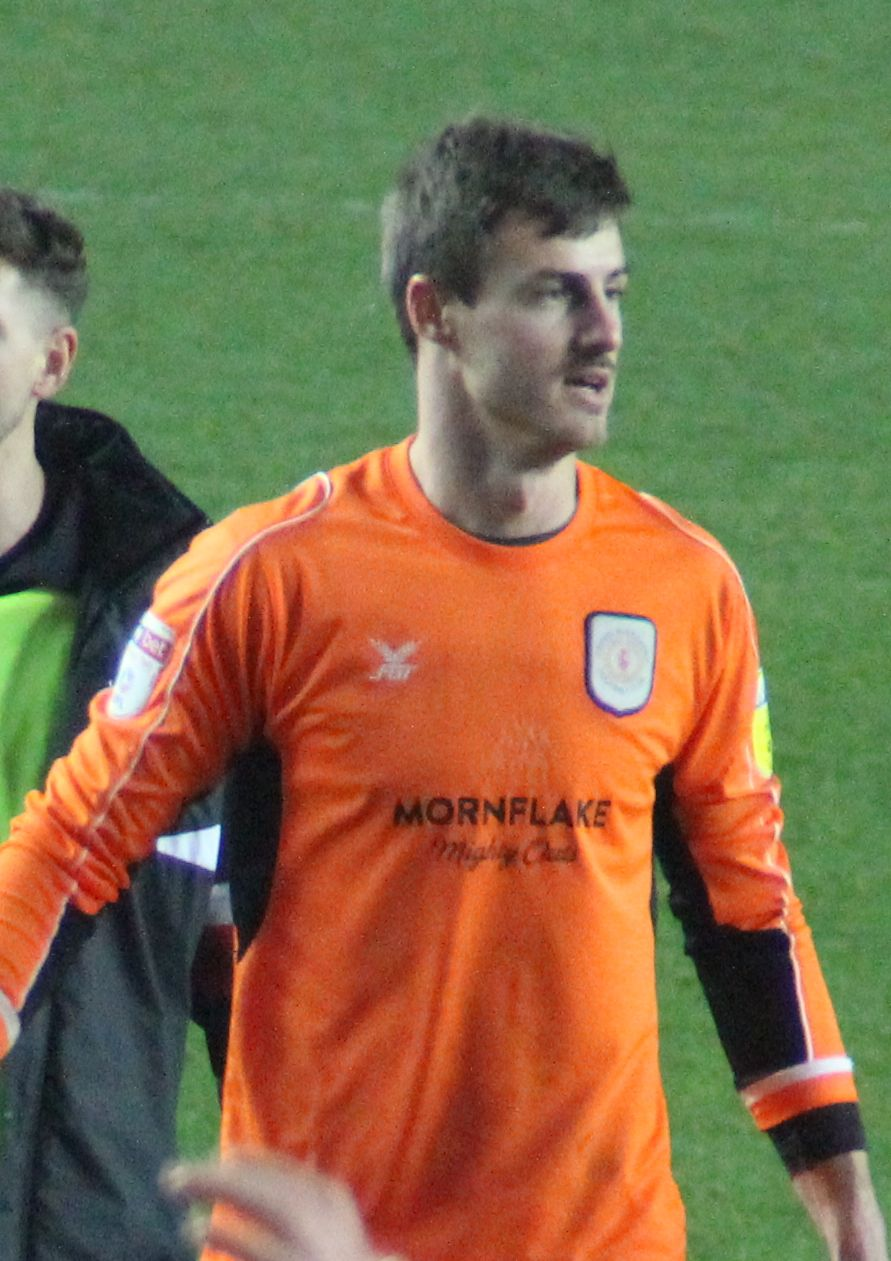
- Garratt with Crewe Alexandra in 2019

Personal information
- Full name: Benjamin Jack Garratt
- Date of birth: 25 April 1994 (age 32)
- Place of birth: Market Drayton, England
- Height: 6 ft 2 in (1.89 m)
- Position: Goalkeeper

Team information
- Current team: Nantwich Town

Youth career
- –2013: Crewe Alexandra

Senior career*
| Years | Team | Apps | (Gls) |
| 2013–2019 | Crewe Alexandra | 223 | (0) |
| 2013 | → Stafford Rangers (loan) | 8 | (0) |
| 2019–2023 | Burton Albion | 92 | (0) |
| 2024– | Nantwich Town | 50 | (0) |

International career
| 2010–2011 | England U17 | 3 | (0) |
| 2012 | England U18 | 1 | (0) |
| 2012 | England U19 | 1 | (0) |
- * Club domestic league appearances and goals as of June 2023

Benjamin Jack Garratt (born 25 April 1994) is an English professional football goalkeeper who plays for Nantwich Town.

He began his career at Crewe Alexandra, making his senior debut in April 2013, shortly after finishing a loan spell at Stafford Rangers. He also won caps for England at youth level and was a squad member at two tournaments for the under-17's in 2011. He established himself as Crewe's first-choice goalkeeper over the next two seasons and then went on to be named as the club's Player of the Year in 2015 and 2016. He left the club in May 2019 after 246 appearances, signing for Burton in October 2019.

== Playing career ==
=== Crewe Alexandra ===
Born in Market Drayton, Shropshire, Garratt graduated through the Academy at Crewe Alexandra to sign a 2 1/2-year professional contract in January 2013; manager Steve Davis noted that "we haven't had a goalkeeper to get excited about for a while". He joined Northern Premier League Premier Division side Stafford Rangers on loan the following month and made eight appearances at Marston Road. He made his senior debut for Crewe on 27 April 2013, in a League One tie against Walsall, two days after his 19th birthday, in a starting 11 comprised completely of academy graduates; he kept a clean sheet in a 2–0 victory at Gresty Road.

He faced competition from Steve Phillips and Alan Martin during the 2013–14 season and featured 27 times before he signed a new two-year deal with Crewe in May 2014; he was also named as 'Breakthrough Player of the Year' at the club's annual awards. At the start of the 2014–15 season he saw off competition from Scott Shearer to establish himself as the club's first-choice goalkeeper. He was nominated for December's League One Player of the Month award after having kept a clean sheet against league leaders Bristol City and "producing stunning saves against both Oldham and Preston". However he broke his leg during a defeat at Barnsley on 21 February. Despite missing the final three months of the campaign with his injury, he was named as the club's Player of the Year and was also voted as Players' Player of the Year. He was an ever-present in the 2015–16 relegation campaign and won his second consecutive Player of the Year award.

In March 2017, Garratt signed a new two-year deal to stay with the "Railwaymen" until the summer of 2019. He was an ever-present again in the 2016–17 League Two season. He featured 40 times in the 2017–18 season and on 5 May once again appeared in a Crewe starting 11 who were all Crewe Academy graduates – he was also one of two players (with George Ray) to feature in both starting elevens. He was also named as the club's Community Player of the Year in March 2018. He was benched in favour of Dave Richards at the start of the 2018–19 season, before winning his place back and making 42 appearances in all competitions. However he was released by Crewe in May 2019. Manager David Artell had offered him a new contract but withdrew the offer after Garratt missed the offer's deadline.

=== Burton Albion ===
After training with Shrewsbury Town and playing in pre-season for Bury, Garratt trained with Blackburn Rovers and then Port Vale at the start of the 2019–20 season. He then signed for Burton Albion in October 2019, making his Burton debut in an EFL Trophy tie against Mansfield Town on 12 November 2019. He was released by the club at the end of the 2022–23 season.

=== Nantwich Town ===
On 22 February 2024, Garratt signed for Northern Premier League Division One West club Nantwich Town.

== International career ==
Garratt won caps for England at under-17, under-18 and under-19 level, and was selected by head coach John Peacock for the 2011 UEFA European Under-17 Championship and 2011 FIFA U-17 World Cup squads.

== Style of play ==
Garratt has been described as a very consistent goalkeeper. His major strengths are shot-stopping, agility, decision making and distribution.

== Career statistics ==
As of end of 2022–23 season

Appearances and goals by club, season and competition
| Club | Season | League | | | FA Cup | | EFL Cup | | Other | | Total | |
| Club | Season | Division | Apps | Goals | Apps | Goals | Apps | Goals | Apps | Goals | Apps | Goals |
|---|---|---|---|---|---|---|---|---|---|---|---|---|
| Crewe Alexandra | 2012–13 | League One | 1 | 0 | 0 | 0 | 0 | 0 | 0 | 0 | 1 | 0 |
| Crewe Alexandra | 2013–14 | League One | 26 | 0 | 1 | 0 | 0 | 0 | 0 | 0 | 27 | 0 |
| Crewe Alexandra | 2014–15 | League One | 30 | 0 | 2 | 0 | 2 | 0 | 0 | 0 | 34 | 0 |
| Crewe Alexandra | 2015–16 | League One | 46 | 0 | 1 | 0 | 1 | 0 | 1 (Note: Appearance/s and goal/s in the Football League Trophy) | 0 | 49 | 0 |
| Crewe Alexandra | 2016–17 | League Two | 46 | 0 | 2 | 0 | 2 | 0 | 3 (Note: Appearance/s and goal/s in the EFL Trophy.) | 0 | 53 | 0 |
| Crewe Alexandra | 2017–18 | League Two | 36 | 0 | 1 | 0 | 1 | 0 | 2 | 0 | 40 | 0 |
| Crewe Alexandra | 2018–19 | League Two | 38 | 0 | 1 | 0 | 0 | 0 | 3 | 0 | 42 | 0 |
| Crewe Alexandra | Total | | 223 | 0 | 8 | 0 | 6 | 0 | 9 | 0 | 246 | 0 |
| Stafford Rangers (loan) | 2012–13 | NPL Premier Division | 8 | 0 | 0 | 0 | — | | 0 | 0 | 8 | 0 |
| Burton Albion | 2019–20 | League One | 3 | 0 | 0 | 0 | 0 | 0 | 1 | 0 | 4 | 0 |
| Burton Albion | 2020–21 | League One | 28 | 0 | 0 | 0 | 1 | 0 | 0 | 0 | 29 | 0 |
| Burton Albion | 2021–22 | League One | 40 | 0 | 2 | 0 | 1 | 0 | 0 | 0 | 43 | 0 |
| Burton Albion | 2022–23 | League One | 21 | 0 | 1 | 0 | 0 | 0 | 3 | 0 | 25 | 0 |
| Burton Albion | Total | | 92 | 0 | 3 | 0 | 2 | 0 | 4 | 0 | 101 | 0 |
| Career total | | | 323 | 0 | 11 | 0 | 8 | 0 | 13 | 0 | 355 | 0 |

== Honours ==
Individual

- Crewe Alexandra F.C. Player of the Year: 2015, 2016
