= 2016–17 Crewe Alexandra F.C. season =

Crewe Alexandra
2016–17 season
- Chairman: John Bowler
- Manager: Steve Davis (until 8 January); David Artell (from 8 January)
- Stadium: Gresty Road
- League Two: 17th
- FA Cup: First round
- League Cup: Second round
- Football League Trophy: Group stage
- Top goalscorer: League: James Jones (10); All: James Jones (11)
Home colours	Away colours	Third colours

The 2016–17 season was Crewe Alexandra's 140th season in their history, their 93rd in the English Football League and first back in League Two following relegation the previous season. Along with competing in League Two, the club also participated in the FA Cup, League Cup and Football League Trophy.

The season covers the period from 1 July 2016 to 30 June 2017.

== Transfers ==
=== Transfers in ===
Date from	Position	Nationality	Name	From	Fee	Ref.
1 July 2016	CF	(England)	Ryan Lowe	Bury	Free transfer	
5 July 2016	CF	(England)	Chris Dagnall	Hibernian	Free transfer	
19 August 2016	CM	(England)	Danny Hollands	Portsmouth	Free transfer	
10 March 2017	GK	(England)	Andrew Dawber	Altrincham	Free transfer	

=== Transfers out ===
Date from	Position	Nationality	Name	To	Fee	Ref.
1 July 2016	CM	(England)	Chris Atkinson	Salford City	Released	(Note: Following Atkinson's release, he signed for Salford City.)
1 July 2016	RB	(England)	James Baillie	Curzon Ashton	Released	(Note: Following Baillie's release, he signed for Curzon Ashton.)
1 July 2016	CF	(England)	Andre Brown	Kidderminster Harriers	Released	(Note: Following Brown's release, he signed for Kidderminster Harriers.)
1 July 2016	CF	(Finland)	Lauri Dalla Valle	Free agent	Released	
1 July 2016	CM	(England)	David Fox	Plymouth Argyle	Released	(Note: Following Fox's release, he signed for Plymouth Argyle.)
1 July 2016	CF	(Canada)	Marcus Haber	Dundee	Released	(Note: Following Haber's release, he signed for Dundee.)
1 July 2016	GK	(England)	Kieran Harrison	Free agent	Released	
1 July 2016	ST	(England)	Johnny Higham	Curzon Ashton	Free transfer	
1 July 2016	CM	(England)	Joe Howell	Free agent	Released	
1 July 2016	CM	(Australia)	Brad Inman	Peterborough United	Free transfer	
1 July 2016	CB	(England)	Joe Kearns	Southport	Released	(Note: Following Kearns's release, he signed for Southport.)
1 July 2016	CM	(England)	Toby Mullarkey	Leek Town	Released	(Note: Following Mullarkey's release, he signed for Leek Town.)
1 July 2016	CF	(Scotland)	Fraser Murdoch	York City	Released	(Note: Following Murdoch's release, he signed for York City.)
1 July 2016	DF	(England)	Matty Neal	Free agent	Released	
1 July 2016	CF	(England)	Liam O'Neill	Free agent	Released	
11 August 2016	DF	(England)	Tom Quinn	Bala Town	Free transfer	
24 January 2017	CF	(England)	Ryan Lowe	Bury	Mutual consent	

=== Loans in ===
Date from	Position	Nationality	Name	From	Date until	Ref.
13 July 2016	CM	(England)	Liam Smith	Newcastle United	9 January 2017	
20 July 2016	RW	(England)	Alex Kiwomya	Chelsea	End of Season	
17 August 2016	RB	(England)	Callum Bullock	Manchester City	1 January 2017	
31 August 2016	RB	(England)	James Yates	Everton	19 January 2017	
17 January 2017	CF	(England)	Jordan Bowery	Leyton Orient	End of Season	
31 January 2017	AM	(England)	Callum Cooke	Middlesbrough	End of Season	
31 January 2017	CF	(England)	Jonny Margetts	Scunthorpe United	3 February 2017	(Note: On 3 February 2017, Jonny Margetts' loan was terminated due to FIFA's rules and regulations.)

=== Loans out ===
Date from	Position	Nationality	Name	To	Date until	Ref.
31 January 2017	CB	(England)	Harry Davis	St Mirren	End of Season	
17 February 2017	CF	(Nigeria)	Daniel Udoh	Solihull Moors	17 March 2017	

== Competitions ==
=== Pre-season friendlies ===
8 July 2016	Buxton	2–3	Crewe Alexandra	Buxton
19:30	Martis 10'; Simpson 12'	Report	Ainley 15'; Dagnall 36'; Udoh 53'	Stadium: The Silverlands

11 July 2016	Kidsgrove Athletic	1–1	Crewe Alexandra	Kidsgrove
19:30	Skelton 6'	Report	Saunders 27'	Stadium: The Novus Stadium

15 July 2016	Crewe Alexandra	0–2	Wolverhampton Wanderers	Crewe
19:30		Report	Iorfa 14'; Mason 89'	Stadium: Gresty Road

19 July 2016	Nantwich Town	0–4	Crewe Alexandra	Nantwich
19:30		Report	Dagnall 18' (pen.); Jones 53' (o.g.); Cooper 64'; Wintle 86'	Stadium: Weaver Stadium

26 July 2016	Altrincham	1–1	Crewe Alexandra	Altrincham
19:45	Cyrus 35'	Report	Cooper 32'	Stadium: Moss Lane

30 July 2016	Lincoln City	3–0	Crewe Alexandra	Lincoln
15:00	Marriott 2', 25'; Muldoon 15'	Report		Stadium: Sincil Bank

=== League Two ===
==== Result summary ====
Overall								Home						Away					
Pld	W	D	L	GF	GA	GD	Pts	W	D	L	GF	GA	GD	W	D	L	GF	GA	GD
46	14	13	19	58	67	−9	55	8	7	8	35	26	+9	6	6	11	23	41	−18

Last updated: 7 May 2017.

==== League table ====
Pos	Team	Pld	W	D	L	GF	GA	GD	Pts
15	Barnet	46	14	15	17	57	64	−7	57
16	Notts County	46	16	8	22	54	76	−22	56
17	Crewe Alexandra	46	14	13	19	58	67	−9	55
18	Morecambe	46	14	10	22	53	73	−20	52
19	Crawley Town	46	13	12	21	53	71	−18	51

Updated to match(es) played on 6 May 2017. Source: BBC Sport
Rules for classification: 1) Points; 2) Goal difference; 3) Number of goals scored

==== Matches ====
6 August 2016 1	Stevenage	1–2	Crewe Alexandra	Stevenage
15:00 BST	Conlon (yellow card) 24'; Wilkinson (yellow card) 32'; Lee 90+4'	Report	Davis (yellow card) 12'; Lowe 64'; Kiwomya 80'	Stadium: Broadhall Way

13 August 2016 2	Crewe Alexandra	0–0	Portsmouth	Crewe
15:00 BST	Dagnall (yellow card) 89'	Report	Naismith (yellow card) 84'	Stadium: Gresty Road; Attendance: 4,742 (1,257)

16 August 2016 3	Crewe Alexandra	3–3	Hartlepool United	Crewe
19:45 BST	Dagnall 31'; Kiwomya 45'; Cooper 56'; Guthrie (yellow card) 90+2'	Report	Magnay 42', 76'; Amond 72'	Stadium: Gresty Road; Attendance: 3,482 (195)

20 August 2016 4	Newport County	1–1	Crewe Alexandra	Newport
15:00 BST	Labadie (yellow card) 29'; Butler (yellow card) 36'; Bennett (yellow card) 80'; Rigg 81'	Report	Kiwomya 16'; Dagnall (yellow card) 60'; Guthrie (yellow card) 61'	Stadium: Rodney Parade; Attendance: 2,268 (284)

27 August 2016 5	Cheltenham Town	2–0	Crewe Alexandra	Cheltenham
15:00 BST	Dickie 16'; Dayton 22'; Cranston (yellow card) 90+3'	Report		Stadium: Whaddon Road

3 September 2016 6	Crewe Alexandra	2–1	Doncaster Rovers	Crewe
15:00 BST	Lowe 14'; Hollands (yellow card) 55'; Jones 87'	Report	Marquis (yellow card) 39'; Rowe 82' (pen.)	Stadium: Alexandra Stadium

10 September 2016 7	Crewe Alexandra	2–0	Exeter City	Crewe
15:00 BST	Kiwomya 23'; Davis (yellow card) 45+2'; Hollands 87'	Report	Stacey (yellow card) 24'	Stadium: Alexandra Stadium

17 September 2016 8	Grimsby Town	0–2	Crewe Alexandra	Cleethorpes
15:00 BST	Bogle (yellow card) 60'; Gowling (yellow card) 72'	Report	Bakayogo (yellow card) 27'; Hollands (yellow card) 43'; Cooper 45+1'; Jones 85'	Stadium: Blundell Park

24 September 2016 9	Crewe Alexandra	1–1	Blackpool	Crewe
15:00 BST	Lowe 71'; Guthrie (yellow card) 85'	Report	Guthrie 10' (o.g.); Mellor (yellow card) 65'; Aldred (yellow card) 69'; McAlister (yellow card) 87'	Stadium: Alexandra Stadium

27 September 2016 10	Wycombe Wanderers	5–1	Crewe Alexandra	High Wycombe
19:45 BST	Wood 19'; Cowan-Hall 39' (yellow card) 58'; Gape 43'; Kashket 63', 69'; Harriman (yellow card) 76'	Report	Cooper 71'	Stadium: Adams Park; Attendance: 2,572; Referee: John Busby

1 October 2016 11	Crewe Alexandra	1–1	Mansfield Town	Crewe
15:00 BST	Ainley (yellow card) 46'; Dagnall 56'; Jones (yellow card) 60'	Report	Hoban (yellow card) 33' (goal) 51'; Rose (yellow card) 43'; McGuire (yellow card) 89'	Stadium: Alexandra Stadium; Attendance: 3,831; Referee: Ross Joyce

8 October 2016 12	Luton Town	1–1	Crewe Alexandra	Luton
15:00 BST	Lee (yellow card) 27'; Hylton 44'; Ruddock (yellow card) 59'	Report	Lowe 64'; Bakayogo (yellow card) 74'	Stadium: Kenilworth Road Stadium; Attendance: 7,716; Referee: Nick Kinseley

15 October 2016 13	Notts County	1–1	Crewe Alexandra	Nottingham
15:00 BST	Forte 80'	Report	Kiwomya 81'	Stadium: Meadow Lane Stadium; Attendance: 8,012; Referee: Lee Probert

22 October 2016 14	Crewe Alexandra	0–1	Yeovil Town	Crewe
15:00 BST	Dagnall (yellow card) 2'	Report	Khan (yellow card) 25'; Dolan 62'	Stadium: Alexandra Stadium; Attendance: 3,659; Referee: Chris Sarginson

29 October 2016 15	Leyton Orient	0–2	Crewe Alexandra	Leyton, London
15:00 BST		Report	Bakayogo (yellow card) 19'; Cooper 34'; Davis 42'; Turton (yellow card) 75'	Stadium: Matchroom Stadium; Attendance: 4,366; Referee: Andy Haines

12 November 2016 16	Crewe Alexandra	1–2	Plymouth Argyle	Crewe
15:00 GMT	Kiwomya 16'; Cooper (penalty missed) 38'	Report	Donaldson (yellow card) 22'; Tanner 41'; Carey 74'	Stadium: Alexandra Stadium; Attendance: 4,573; Referee: Nigel Miller

19 November 2016 17	Barnet	0–0	Crewe Alexandra	Canons Park, London
15:00 GMT		Report	Lowery (yellow card) 70'	Stadium: The Hive Stadium; Attendance: 1,603; Referee: Gavin Ward

22 November 2016 18	Crewe Alexandra	2–1	Morecambe	Crewe
19:45 GMT	Kiwomya 19'; Jones 42'	Report	Turner 8'; Edwards (yellow card) 70'; Wakefield (yellow card) 83'	Stadium: Alexandra Stadium; Attendance: 2,844; Referee: Trevor Kettle

26 November 2016 19	Colchester United	4–0	Crewe Alexandra	Colchester
15:00 GMT	Guthrie 20'; Lapslie (yellow card) 44'; Garvan 72'; Wright 76'; Dickenson 90+2'	Report		Stadium: Weston Homes Community Stadium; Attendance: 2,931; Referee: Nick Kinseley

10 December 2016 20	Crewe Alexandra	0–2	Crawley Town	Crewe
15:00 GMT	Davis (yellow card) 90+4'	Report	Collins 21', 75'	Stadium: Alexandra Stadium; Attendance: 3,392; Referee: David Webb

17 December 2016 21	Cambridge United	2–1	Crewe Alexandra	Cambridge
15:00 GMT	Ikpeazu 51'; Taylor 60'	Report	Jones 68'	Stadium: The R Costings Abbey Stadium; Attendance: 4,167; Referee: Lee Collins

26 December 2016 22	Crewe Alexandra	1–1	Carlisle United	Crewe
15:00 GMT	Cooper 45'; Guthrie (yellow card) 66'	Report	Miller 35' (yellow card) 36'; Lambe (yellow card) 74'; Raynes (yellow card) 89'	Stadium: Alexandra Stadium; Attendance: 4,962; Referee: Rob Lewis

31 December 2016 23	Crewe Alexandra	0–1	Accrington Stanley	Crewe
15:00 GMT		Report	Donacien (yellow card) 28'; Kee 43'; Conneely (yellow card) 59'	Stadium: Alexandra Stadium; Attendance: 3,471; Referee: Eddie Ilderton

2 January 2017 24	Morecambe	0–0	Crewe Alexandra	Morecambe
15:00 GMT	Edwards (yellow card) 90+3'	Report		Stadium: Globe Arena; Attendance: 1,722; Referee: Ben Toner

7 January 2017 25	Mansfield Town	3–0	Crewe Alexandra	Mansfield
15:00 GMT	Arquin 5'; Whiteman (yellow card) 23' (goal) 48'; Bennett 83'	Report		Stadium: One Call Stadium; Attendance: 3,040; Referee: Mark Brown

14 January 2017 26	Crewe Alexandra	1–2	Luton Town	Crewe
15:00 GMT	Lowe 28'; Hollands (yellow card) 37'; Turton (yellow card) 49'; Jones (yellow card) 79'	Report	Cook (yellow card) 30'; Sheehan (yellow card) 32' (yellow-red card) 53'; Marriott 45'; Gray 69'	Stadium: Alexandra Stadium; Attendance: 4,368; Referee: Graham Salisbury

21 January 2017 27	Doncaster Rovers	3–1	Crewe Alexandra	Doncaster
15:00 GMT	Grant 22'; Blair (yellow card) 51'; Marquis 56'; Rowe 68'; Williams (yellow card) 73'; Butler (yellow card) 83'	Report	Jones 32'; Ray (yellow card) 82'	Stadium: The Keepmoat Stadium; Attendance: 5,737; Referee: Andy Haines

28 January 2017 28	Crewe Alexandra	0–0	Cheltenham Town	Crewe
15:00 GMT		Report	Wright (yellow card) 45'	Stadium: Alexandra Stadium; Attendance: 3,373; Referee: Darren Handley

4 February 2017 29	Exeter City	4–0	Crewe Alexandra	Exeter
15:00 GMT	Moore-Taylor 8'; Wheeler 58', 68'; James 85'	Report	Kirk (red card) 82'	Stadium: St James Park; Attendance: 4,534; Referee: Gavin Ward

11 February 2017 30	Crewe Alexandra	5–0	Grimsby Town	Crewe
15:00 GMT	Cooper 2', 25' (yellow card) 62'; Dagnall 16', 29'; Cooke 87'; Nugent (yellow card) 90+3'	Report	Dyson (yellow card) 6'; Pearson (yellow card) 35'; Gunning (yellow card) 90+2'	Stadium: Alexandra Stadium; Attendance: 4,003; Referee: Kevin Johnson

14 February 2017 31	Crewe Alexandra	2–1	Wycombe Wanderers	Crewe
19:45 GMT	Dagnall 11'; Turton (yellow card) 39'; Jones 87' (pen.) (yellow card) 88'	Report	O'Nien (yellow card) 50'; Akinfenwa 75'; Jombati (yellow card) 88'	Stadium: Alexandra Stadium; Attendance: 2,896; Referee: Michael Salisbury

18 February 2017 32	Blackpool	2–2	Crewe Alexandra	Blackpool
15:00 GMT	Delfouneso 8'; Aldred (yellow card) 21' (goal) 27'	Report	Cooke (yellow card) 57'; Dagnall 62'; Turton 88'	Stadium: Bloomfield Road; Attendance: 3,389; Referee: Ben Toner

25 February 2017 33	Crewe Alexandra	1–2	Stevenage	Crewe
15:00 GMT	Dagnall (red card) 24'; Jones 71' (pen.); Nugent (yellow card) 90+2'	Report	Godden 7'; Jones (red card) 25'; Franks 36'; Lee (yellow card) 59'	Stadium: Gresty Road; Attendance: 3,547; Referee: Darren England

28 February 2017 34	Hartlepool United	4–0	Crewe Alexandra	Hartlepool
19:45 GMT	Alessandra 45', 85'; Amond 71'; Thomas (yellow card) 84' (goal) 90+1'; Oates (yellow card) 88'	Report	Bakayogo (yellow card) 69'; Nugent (yellow card) 86'	Stadium: Victoria Park; Attendance: 3,043; Referee: Richard Clark

4 March 2017 35	Portsmouth	0–1	Crewe Alexandra	Portsmouth
15:00 GMT	Evans (yellow card) 70'	Report	Jones (yellow card) 58'; Ray 77'	Stadium: Fratton Park; Attendance: 16,810; Referee: John Busby

11 March 2017 36	Crewe Alexandra	1–2	Newport County	Crewe
15:00 GMT	Cooke 22'; Jones (yellow card) 45'	Report	Bird (yellow card) 46'; Butler 53'; Labadie (yellow card) 85' (goal) 89'	Stadium: Alexandra Stadium; Attendance: 3,725; Referee: Mark Haywood

14 March 2017 37	Crawley Town	0–3	Crewe Alexandra	Crawley
19:45 GMT	Smith (yellow card) 35'; Yorwerth (yellow card) 82'	Report	Jones 37' (pen.); Bowery 50'; Dagnall 52'; Bakayogo (yellow card) 73'	Stadium: Broadfield Stadium; Attendance: 1,566; Referee: Darren Deadman

18 March 2017 38	Crewe Alexandra	2–0	Colchester United	Crewe
15:15 GMT	Dagnall 26', 84'	Report	Pyke (yellow card) 45+1'	Stadium: Gresty Road; Attendance: 3,407; Referee: Graham Horwood

25 March 2017 39	Carlisle United	0–2	Crewe Alexandra	Carlisle
15:00 GMT	Miller (red card) 51'; Proctor (yellow card) 81'; Waring (yellow card) 90+3'	Report	Cooke 34'; Bowery 60'	Stadium: Brunton Park; Attendance: 4,695; Referee: Nigel Miller

1 April 2017 40	Crewe Alexandra	1–2	Cambridge United	Crewe
15:00 GMT	Turton (yellow card) 9'; Legge 58' (o.g.); Nugent (yellow card) 71'	Report	Berry 37', 72'; Lewis (red card) 90+1'	Stadium: Gresty Road; Attendance: 3,759; Referee: Seb Stockbridge

8 April 2017 41	Accrington Stanley	3–2	Crewe Alexandra	Accrington
15:00 BST	Hughes 57', 79'; McCartan 61' (yellow card) 86'; Kee (yellow card) 75'	Report	Ray (yellow card) 12'; Cooke 15'; Dagnall 41' (yellow card) 61'	Stadium: Crown Ground; Attendance: 1,720; Referee: Ross Joyce

14 April 2017 42	Crewe Alexandra	2–2	Notts County	Crewe
15:00 BST	Dagnall 38'; Jones 66'	Report	Campbell 9'; O'Connor 51'; Hewitt (yellow card) 86'; Ameobi (yellow card) 90'	Stadium: Gresty Road; Attendance: 5,016; Referee: Gavin Ward

17 April 2017 43	Yeovil Town	3–0	Crewe Alexandra	Yeovil
15:00 BST	Dolan 29'; Zoko (yellow card) 34'; Akpa Akpro 45+1' (yellow card) 65'; Khan 70'	Report	Cooper (yellow card) 81'	Stadium: Huish Park; Attendance: 3,167; Referee: Lee Swabey

22 April 2017 44	Crewe Alexandra	3–0	Leyton Orient	Crewe
15:00 BST	Ainley 26'; Wintle 30'; Cooper 45+1'; Bakayogo (yellow card) 72'	Report		Stadium: Gresty Road; Attendance: 3,745; Referee: Mark Brown

29 April 2017 45	Plymouth Argyle	2–1	Crewe Alexandra	Plymouth
15:00 BST	Sarcevic (yellow card) 45'; Taylor 74'; Blissett 79'	Report	Jones 6'; Ng (yellow card) 72'	Stadium: Home Park; Attendance: 13,313; Referee: Trevor Kettle

6 May 2017 46	Crewe Alexandra	4–1	Barnet	Crewe
17:30 BST	Dagnall 8', 25', 67'; Cooper 76'	Report	Weston 64'	Stadium: Gresty Road; Attendance: 4,587; Referee: John Brooks

=== FA Cup ===
5 November 2016 First round	Cheltenham Town	1–1	Crewe Alexandra	Cheltenham
15:00 GMT	Storer (red card) 37'; Waters 58'; Cranston (yellow card) 86'	Report	Davis (yellow card) 6'; Jones 73'	Stadium: LCI Rail Stadium; Attendance: 2,880; Referee: Michael Salisbury

15 November 2016 First round replay	Crewe Alexandra	1–4	Cheltenham Town	Crewe
19:45 GMT	Lowe 64'	Report	Pell 19'; Barthram 36'; Dickie (yellow card) 47'; Waters 52'; Holman 61'	Stadium: Alexandra Stadium; Attendance: 1,711; Referee: Seb Stockbridge

=== EFL Cup ===
9 August 2016 First round	Sheffield United	1–2 (a.e.t.)	Crewe Alexandra	Sheffield
19:45 BST	Clarke 6'; O'Connell (yellow card) 65'	Report	Lowe 89', 100'	Stadium: Bramall Lane; Attendance: 8,305 (198 from Crewe)

23 August 2016 Second round	Blackburn Rovers	4–3 (a.e.t.)	Crewe Alexandra	Blackburn
19:45 BST	Akpan 42'; Wharton 69'; Conway 88'; Guthrie (yellow card) 90+2'; Duffy 97'; Gallagher (yellow card) 103'	Report	Bingham 8'; Dagnall 39', 90+3'	Stadium: Ewood Park; Attendance: 3,448 (535 from Crewe)

=== EFL Trophy ===
Pos	Div	Team	Pld	W	PW	PL	L	GF	GA	GD	Pts	Qualification
1	ACA	Wolverhampton Wanderers U21	3	2	0	0	1	8	4	+4	6	Advance to Round 2
2	L1	Chesterfield	3	2	0	0	1	5	5	0	6	Advance to Round 2
3	L2	Crewe Alexandra	3	1	0	0	2	5	5	0	3	
4	L2	Accrington Stanley	3	1	0	0	2	4	8	−4	3	

Source: Sky Sports

30 August 2016 Group stage 1	Accrington Stanley	0–3	Crewe Alexandra	Accrington
19:45 BST	Pearson (yellow card) 45'		Kirk (yellow card) 45+1'; Ainley 47'; Jones (yellow card) 57'; Bakayogo (yellow card) 62'; Cooper 76'; Nugent (yellow card) 80'; Udoh 90+3'	Stadium: Crown Ground

4 October 2016 Group stage 2	Crewe Alexandra	2–3	Wolverhampton Wanderers U23	Crewe
19:30 BST	Dagnall 69'; Bakayogo (yellow card) 77'; Lowe 82'	Report	Dicko 7', 45+1'; Enobakhare 88'; Wilson (yellow card) 90+4'	Stadium: Alexandra Stadium; Attendance: 963

8 November 2016 Group stage 3	Crewe Alexandra	0–2	Chesterfield	Crewe
19:30 GMT	Perry Ng (yellow card) 22'	Report	O'Shea 22'; Mitchell (yellow card) 35'; Ofoegbu (yellow card) 65'; Ariyibi (yellow card) 72'; Dimaio 81' (pen.)	Stadium: Alexandra Stadium; Attendance: 929; Referee: Roger East
