= Zoumana Bakayogo =

French footballer (born 1986)

Personal information
- Full name: Zoumana Bakayogo
- Date of birth: 17 August 1986 (age 40)
- Place of birth: Paris, France
- Height: 1.75 m (5 ft 9 in)
- Position: Defender

Senior career*
Years	Team	Apps	(Gls)
2004–2006	Paris Saint-Germain	0	(0)
2006–2008	Millwall	16	(0)
2007	→ Brighton & Hove Albion (loan)	0	(0)
2008–2009	Alfortville	18	(0)
2009–2013	Tranmere Rovers	128	(6)
2013–2015	Leicester City	0	(0)
2014	→ Yeovil Town (loan)	1	(0)
2016–2018	Crewe Alexandra	94	(1)
2018–2019	Tranmere Rovers	21	(0)
2019–2020	Notts County	14	(0)

International career
2007–2008	Ivory Coast U23	4	(0)
- * Club domestic league appearances and goals as of 18:00, 6 March 2020 (UTC)

Zoumana Bakayogo (born 17 August 1986) is a professional footballer who plays as a defender. He is currently a free agent after being released by National League club Notts County. Born in France, Bakayogo was a youth international for Ivory Coast.

== Club career ==
=== Early career ===
Born in Paris, France, Bakayogo began his career at Paris Saint-Germain Youth Academy, and spent two years at the club since turning professional but never made a single appearance for the side and left the club in 2006.

Bakayogo moved to England when he went on trial at Brighton & Hove Albion in July 2006. However, the club decided against giving Bakayogo a contract. He joined Millwall on a free transfer shortly after on 3 August 2006. He featured in seven games for Millwall in the first half of the 2006–07 season, making his competitive debut on 22 August 2006, in a 2–1 win over Gillingham at The New Den in the League Cup First round. Following Willie Donachie's appointment on 22 November, he was only to make three further appearances that season. By the time he departed Millwall on loan to Brighton & Hove Albion, Bakayogo reflected on his time for the side, saying: "I didn't have much time to play at Millwall. I'm here to play now and I hope it brings results. At the start (at Millwall) it was a bit too physical. I had to get used to it, I had no choice. I feel more comfortable now."

In January 2007 he was sent on loan to Brighton & Hove Albion. He suffered a nightmare season on the south coast where, despite staying at the Withdean for the rest of the season, he played no first team games due to an ankle injury and international call-ups. As a result of his injury he sustained during his time at Brighton & Hove Albion, Manager Dean Wilkins branded his spell at the club a "disaster".

Bakayogo returned to Millwall in the 2007–08 season, where he was told by the club's management that he can leave the club. Bakayogo made his first appearance of the season, coming on as a late substitute, in a 2–1 loss against Swindon Town on 29 September 2007. He then made two starts between 17 November 2007 and 24 November 2007, coming against Bristol Rovers (which during the game, he gave away the late goal to give Bristol Rovers a win) and Yeovil Town. Despite determined to fight for his first team place for Millwall and spending most of his time at the club's reserve, Bakayogo went on to make eleven appearances for the side. At the end of the 2007–08 season, he was released by Millwall. Bakayogo returned to France by joining Alfortville for the 2008–09 season.

=== Tranmere Rovers ===
Over the summer of 2009, Bakayogo went on trial at Southend United and Port Vale, but was unsuccessful. On 1 September 2009, it was announced that Tranmere Rovers had signed Bakayogo on a free transfer until January 2010.

Bakayogo made his Tranmere Rovers debut on 12 October 2009 against Stockport County, starting the whole game, in a 1–0 win, keeping the side a clean sheet in the process. He had a successful start at Tranmere with two man-of-the-match performances. He quickly became a fan favourite among Tranmere Rovers’ supporters and earned a nickname: “Zoum” “Back of the Echo” by manager Les Parry. Speculation was rife that Bakayogo would leave Prenton Park at the end of his short-term deal with several clubs showing an interest in him. Leeds United and Southampton were clubs that had been mentioned as supposedly wanting to sign the defender, however at the end of December 2009 it was announced that the player had agreed a new deal until the end of the season. He signed in time to be included in the squad for the 3rd round of the English FA Cup, playing against Premier League club Wolverhampton Wanderers. He played well at left back in a game Tranmere lost 1–0. Bakayogo started in every match since joining the club until his sending off at stoppage time for second bookable offence, in a 1–1 draw against Charlton Athletic on 30 January 2010. He was then once again sent–off for a second bookable offence, in a 0–0 draw against Bristol Rovers on 13 March 2010 and served a two match suspension. Bakayogo then returned to the starting lineup, starting the whole game, in a 3–0 loss against Wycombe Wanderers on 13 April 2010. He successfully kept Tranmere in League One, securing the team's place for the next season with a vital victory away at Stockport on the final day of the 2009-10 season, in which he set up a goal during the match. At the end of the 2009–10 season, making thirty–four appearances at Tranmere Rovers, his impressive performances earned him a new contract offer in May 2010 He signed a new one-year contract on 6 July 2010. Parry added: "I'm delighted Zoom has decided to stay at the club. He was one of our most consistent performers last season and he has a fantastic attitude in training and around the ground."

At the start of the 2010–11 season, Bakayogo found himself on the substitute bench, due to impressive form from Aaron Cresswell, who ironically kept him out of the position last season. His first appearance of the season came on 28 August 2010, coming on as a substitute for Paul McLaren in the 34th minute, in a 2–2 draw against Dagenham & Redbridge. He made his first starts of the season on 27 October 2010, starting the whole game, against Stockport County in the Football League Trophy campaign and helped the side beat them on penalty shootout after the game went extra time. However, in his second start of the season, Bakayogo was sent–off for a second bookable offence, in a 4–2 against Milton Keynes Dons on 30 October 2010. He then spent several months back to the substitute bench. After being sidelined with an injury in January, Bakayogo soon regained his first team place following Cresswell's injury. Bakoyogo then scored his first goal for the club in a match against Exeter City on 1 March 2011. He later helped the side finish in eighteen place and fought off relegation for the second time at the end of the 2010–11 season. At the end of the 2010–11 season, making thirty appearances and scoring once in all competitions, he signed a further two-year contract with Tranmere Rovers until 2013.

In the 2011–12 season, Bakayogo continued to find himself on the substitute bench, due to impressive form from new signing David Buchanan. Despite this, Manager Les Parry said about his appearance, saying: ”Zoumana Bakayogo gave us fresh legs and a bit of pace.” He then set up a winning goal for Mustafa Tiryaki, in a 2–1 win over Walsall on 22 October 2011. However, Bakayogo spent the rest of the year on the sidelines, due to being on the substitute bench and his own injury concern. But he returned on 30 December 2011 against Bury, coming on as a substitute and set up a goal for Ash Taylor, in a 2–1 win. Bakayogo then started the next three matches for the side before being sidelined with injury concerns. After spending two months on the sidelines, Bakayogo returned from injury, where he scoring a goal to beat Prescot Cables on penalty shootouts after the game finished 4–4 through 120 minutes to book their place in the Liverpool Senior Cup final. He then returned to the first team, coming on as a substitute, in a 1–0 loss against Chesterfield on 3 March 2012. Bakayogo spent the rest of the season, coming on as a substitute in the club's remaining matches. At the end of the 2011–12 season, he went on to make thirty appearances for the side.

In the 2012–13 season, Bakayogo established himself in the first team once again following the departure of David Buchanan. He managed to fought off competition from new signing Paul Black. Bakayogo started the season well when he scored his first goal in over a year, in a 3–1 win over Leyton Orient in the opening game of the season. Bakayogo then scored his second goal of the season, in a 4–0 win over Colchester United on 1 September 2012. After the match, Manager Ronnie Moore said: “Zoum has the energy to get into scoring positions and to get back. His was a great finish.” He then set up a goal for Jake Cassidy, who later scored twice, in a 5–2 win over Crawley Town on 22 September 2012. Due to Black's return from injury, Bakayogo began to "play into a more attacking role" for the side, which Manager Moore said: "Once Paul has some sort of fitness we will have the option of playing him at left back so we can push Zoumana Bakayogo further forward into the wide midfield role". His third goal for the club of the season came on 12 January 2013, in a 2–0 win over Crawley Town. His performance led the club to begin negotiating with Bakayogo over a new contract. In a match against Stevenage on 24 March 2013, Bakayogo scored twice for the side, in a 3–1 win, adding his tally to five goals this season. For his performance in the 2012–13 season, where he made fifty–two appearances and scoring five times for the side, Bakayogo was awarded the fans’ player of the season and players’ player of the season awards.

Manager Moore confirmed that Bakayogo was leaving the club at the end of the 2012/13 season. This was confirmed with the signing of left back Evan Horwood from Hartlepool United and when he did not return to pre-season training in June 2013.

=== Leicester City ===
On 22 July 2013, the BBC reported that Leicester City had signed Bakayogo on a two-year contract following his release from Tranmere Rovers. Bakayogo made his début on 27 August 2013 in Leicester's 5–2 League Cup win against Carlisle United. However, he found his first team opportunities limited at the club, due to competition from Paul Konchesky and Jeffrey Schlupp.

On 17 January 2014, Bakayogo joined Yeovil Town on a month-long loan deal as cover for the injured Liam Davis. Bakayogo made his Yeovil debut against Birmingham City, on 18 January 2014, in a 2–0 win but ruptured his anterior cruciate ligament after just 37 minutes and returned to parent club Leicester City.

On 15 September 2014, Bakayogo returned from injury, playing in the club's reserve match, in a 2–0 loss against Fulham U21. But his return was short–lived when he suffered his anterior cruciate ligament injury, which required him to have surgery. This resulted in him out long term.

=== Crewe Alexandra ===
On 15 January 2016, Bakayogo signed for League One side Crewe Alexandra on a deal until the end of the season. It came after when he went on trial with the side over the summer, as he was recovering from injury.

Almost two years since he last played a competitive match, Bakayogo made his Crewe debut as a substitute against Swindon Town on 16 January 2016. Having stayed on the substitute bench at first, he quickly became a first team regular for the side, establishing himself in the left–back position. Manager Steve Davis often put him in the left–midfield position. Just over a month later, on 20 February 2016, he scored his first Crewe goal in a 3–1 defeat at Chesterfield. Having played a major role during the second half of the season, Bakayogo was unable to help the club avoid relegation after losing 3–0 against Port Vale on 9 April 2016. After making 22 first team appearances and scoring once for the side, in June 2016, Bakayogo signed a one-year contract at Crewe, with an option of a further year.

In the 2016–17 season, Bakayogo continued to establish himself in the starting eleven, playing in the left–back position. He then captained the side on two occasions throughout August against Sheffield United and Accrington Stanley, both in the League Cup and EFL Trophy respectively. Bakayogo then set up two goals in two matches between 16 August 2016 and 20 August 2016 against Hartlepool United and Newport County. His performance throughout August earned him praise from Peter Morse, who wrote his opinion on local newspaper, Crewe Chronicle. Between 30 August 2016 and 24 September 2016, he helped the side go on a five match unbeaten and kept three clean sheets in the process. Bakayogo started in every match since the start of the season until he tore his hamstring during a 2–1 loss against Plymouth Argyle on 12 November 2016. On 17 December 2016, he made his return from injury, starting the whole game, in a 2–1 loss against Cambridge United. Bakayogo continued to regain his first team place for the side, playing in the left–back position despite being dropped to the substitute bench on two occasions. On 8 March 2017, Bakayogo earned an extended deal through to the summer of 2018 after triggering a contract clause. At the end of the 2016–17 season, he made forty–six appearances in all competitions for the side.

At the start of the 2017–18 season, Bakayogo was sidelined, due to a knee injury during the club's pre–season. After missing the first three matches for the side, he made his return on 19 August 2017 against Barnet and set up the only goal in the game with a 1–0 win. He then regained his first team place for the side, playing in the left–back position since returning from injury, as well as, competing with youngster Harry Pickering over the position. However, he was dropped to the substitute bench on two occasions, as well as, his own injury concern. He was later sent–off for a second bookable offence, in a 4–3 loss against Swindon Town on 27 January 2018. Later in the 2017–18 season, Bakayogo suffered a calf injury, which he sustained during a 2–1 loss against Coventry City on 17 March 2018. After spending a month on the sidelines, Bakayogo returned to the starting eleven, starting the whole game, in a 2–1 win over Crawley Town on 28 April 2018, in what turns out to be his last appearance for the club. At the end of the 2017–18 season, he went on to make thirty–six appearances in all competitions for the side.

However, on 9 May 2018, Crewe manager David Artell informed Bakayogo he would not be offered a new contract at the club.

=== Return to Tranmere Rovers ===
On 18 July 2018, Bakayogo rejoined Tranmere Rovers on a one-year contract.

Bakayogo made his Tranmere Rovers in his second spell, which came in the opening game of the season against Stevenage and played the whole game, as they drew 2–2. However, he missed two matches, due to a calf injury he sustained during a 3–1 loss against Walsall in the first round of the League Cup, which he captained the side. On 1 September 2018, Bakayogo made his return from injury, coming on as a late substitute, in a 1–1 draw against Northampton Town. He then set up two goals for Harvey Gilmour, who played a huge role, in a 4–3 win over Morecambe on 6 October 2018. However, Bakayogo suffered a hamstring injury during the match and was sidelined for a month. On 17 November 2018, he returned to the first team from injury and set up a goal for Ollie Banks, in a 3–2 loss against Crewe Alexandra. Due to strong competition in the club's defence, he was often used in first team ins and out for the side, resulting in him being placed on the substitute bench. However, Bakayogo, once again, faced his own injury concern throughout the 2018–19 season and lost his first team place to Liam Ridehalgh. Despite not being involved in the team, the club won promotion to League One after beating Newport County 1-0 at Wembley in the 2019 League Two play-off final, following a 6th-place finish in League Two. At the end of the 2018–19 season, making twenty–five appearances, Bakayogo was released by the club.

=== Notts County ===
On 31 July 2019, Bakayogo joined National League side Notts County on a free transfer.

He made his Notts County debut, starting the whole game, in a 1–0 loss against Eastleigh in the opening game of the season. After the match, local newspaper Nottingham Post praised Bakayogo's performance for the side. He then played in the left–midfield in the next two matches for the side before playing in the left–back position for the first time, in a 2–1 win over Harrogate Town, However, Bakayogo found himself competing with Damien McCrory over the left–back position. Manager Neal Ardley explained his omissions, which saw him placed on the substitute bench: “Before the game (against Wrexham) I had to pull Zoumana Bakayogo and say ‘listen I am not leaving you out for any other reason than we need to freshen the team up’. He has been excellent as well. That's the problem you want which is not being able to justify why somebody isn't in the team.” But he soon regained his first team place in the left–back position for seven matches between 21 September 2019 and 26 October 2019. However, Bakayogo found himself out of the first team, due to competing with Damien McCrory over the left-back position that saw him placed on the substitute bench and his own injury concern.

As a result, he made more two appearances for Notts County, which by then, the league was permanently suspended on 26 March due to the COVID-19 pandemic in England, with Notts County in the play-offs in third-place. The club reached the play-off final at Wembley Stadium, though Bakayogo was not in the match day squad as they lost 3–1 to Harrogate Town. At the end of the 2019-20 season, he made fifteen appearances in all competitions. Following this, Bakayogo was released by Notts County.

== International career ==
Although born in the French capital Paris, Bakayogo is of Ivorian descent and is thus eligible to play for their national side. He was part of the Ivory Coast under-23 Olympic side and played against African rivals Senegal on 22 August 2007 in a qualifier for the 2008 Summer Olympics.

== Personal life ==
Bakayogo has a younger brother, Abou Bakayogo, who also a footballer, and once had a trial at Tranmere Rovers and played together with him in a friendly match against Chester in July 2010.

== Career statistics ==
As of match played 5 May 2018

Appearances and goals by club, season and competition
Club	Season	League			FA Cup		League Cup		Other		Total	
Club	Season	Division	Apps	Goals	Apps	Goals	Apps	Goals	Apps	Goals	Apps	Goals
Millwall	2006–07	League One	5	0	1	0	2	0	2	0	10	0
Millwall	2007–08	League One	10	0	3	0	0	0	0	0	13	0
Millwall	2008–09	League One	1	0	0	0	0	0	0	0	1	0
Millwall	Millwall total		16	0	4	0	2	0	2	0	24	0
Tranmere Rovers	2009–10	League One	29	0	5	0	0	0	0	0	34	0
Tranmere Rovers	2010–11	League One	27	1	0	0	0	0	3	0	30	1
Tranmere Rovers	2011–12	League One	26	0	0	0	1	0	3	0	30	0
Tranmere Rovers	2012-13	League One	46	5	3	0	2	0	1	0	52	5
Tranmere Rovers	Tranmere total		128	6	8	0	3	0	7	0	146	6
Leicester City	2013–14	Championship	0	0	0	0	2	0	—		2	0
Yeovil Town (loan)	2013–14	Championship	1	0	0	0	0	0	—		1	0
Crewe Alexandra	2015–16	League One	22	1	0	0	0	0	0	0	22	1
Crewe Alexandra	2016–17	League Two	40	0	1	0	2	0	3	0	46	0
Crewe Alexandra	2017–18	League Two	32	0	1	0	0	0	3	0	36	0
Crewe Alexandra	Crewe total		94	1	2	0	2	0	6	0	104	1
League career total			229	7	14	0	9	0	17	0	269	7

== Honours ==
Tranmere Rovers

- EFL League Two play-offs: 2019
