= 2015–16 Crewe Alexandra F.C. season =

Crewe Alexandra
2015–16 season
- Chairman: John Bowler
- Manager: Steve Davis
- Stadium: Gresty Road
- League One: 24th (relegated)
- FA Cup: First round
- League Cup: First round (knocked out by Preston North End)
- JP Trophy: Second round
- Top goalscorer: League: Brad Inman (10); All: Brad Inman; Marcus Haber (10 each)

The 2015–16 season was Crewe Alexandra's 139th season in their history, their 92nd in the English Football League and fourth consecutive season in League One. Along with competing in League One, the club also participated in the FA Cup, League Cup and JP Trophy. The season covers the period from 1 July 2015 to 30 June 2016.

== Transfers ==
=== Transfers in ===
Date from	Position	Nationality	Name	From	Fee	Ref.
1 July 2015	ST	ENG	Andre Brown	Academy	Trainee	
1 July 2015	CM	ENG	Joe Howell	Academy	Trainee	
1 July 2015	CB	ENG	Joe Kearns	Academy	Trainee	
1 July 2015	FW	ENG	Liam O'Neill	Academy	Trainee	
1 July 2015	CM	ENG	Toby Mullarkey	Academy	Trainee	
6 July 2015	CM	ENG	Billy Bingham	Dagenham & Redbridge	Free transfer	
14 July 2015	CM	ENG	David Fox	Colchester United	Free transfer	
28 July 2015	GK	WAL	Dave Richards	Bristol City	Free transfer	
3 August 2015	DF	ENG	Ben Nugent	Cardiff City	Free transfer	
21 March 2016	FW	NGA	Daniel Udoh	Ilkeston	–	
6 May 2016	FW	ENG	Tom Lowery	Academy	Trainee	

=== Transfers out ===
Date from	Position	Nationality	Name	To	Fee	Ref.
1 July 2015	CM	ENG	Anthony Grant	Port Vale	Free transfer	
1 July 2015	CM	NIR	Liam Nolan	Southport (Note: Following Nolan's release he joined Southport.)	Released	
1 July 2015	CF	ENG	Vadaine Oliver	York City (Note: Following Oliver's release he joined York City.)	Free transfer	
1 July 2015	GK	SCO	Scott Shearer	Mansfield Town (Note: Following Shearer's release he joined Mansfield Town.)	Free transfer	
1 July 2015	CB	ENG	Anthony Stewart	Wycombe Wanderers (Note: Following Stewart's release he joined Wycombe Wanderers.)	Free transfer	
1 July 2015	RB	ENG	Matt Tootle	Shrewsbury Town	Free transfer	
1 July 2015	DM	ENG	Billy Waters	Cheltenham Town (Note: Following Waters' release he joined Cheltenham Town.)	Free transfer	
5 September 2015	GK	USA	Paul Rachubka	Bolton Wanderers	Free transfer	

=== Loans in ===
Date from	Position	Nationality	Name	From	Date until	Ref.
6 July 2015	CM	SCO	Adam King	Swansea City	5 January 2016	
26 August 2015	LB	SCO	Stephen Kingsley	Swansea City	27 November 2015	
26 August 2015	LW	WAL	Harry Wilson	Liverpool	5 January 2016	
1 October 2015	GK	AUS	Danijel Nizic	Burnley	1 November 2015	
26 November 2015	CB	NGA	Semi Ajayi	Cardiff City	26 January 2016	
29 January 2016	ST	ENG	Ryan Seager	Southampton	17 February	
23 February 2016	ST	ENG	Tom Hitchcock	Milton Keynes Dons	End of season	

== Squad statistics ==
=== Appearances and goals ===
No.	Pos.	Nat.	Name	League One		FA Cup		League Cup		Football League Trophy		Total	
No.	Pos.	Nat.	Name	Apps	Goals	Apps	Goals	Apps	Goals	Apps	Goals	Apps	Goals
1	GK	ENG	Ben Garratt	46	0	1	0	1	0	1	0	49	0
2	DF	ENG	Ollie Turton	46	1	1	0	1	0	1	0	49	1
3	DF	ENG	Jon Guthrie	38 (1)	1	1	0	1	0	1	0	41 (1)	1
4	DF	ENG	Harry Davis	10 (1)	0	0	0	0	0	0	0	10 (1)	0
5	DF	WAL	George Ray	19 (3)	0	1	0	1	0	1	0	22 (3)	0
6	DF	ENG	Ben Nugent	39	1	1	0	1	0	1	0	42	1
8	MF	ENG	Chris Atkinson	7 (9)	0	0	0	0	0	0 (1)	0	8 (10)	0
9	ST	CAN	Marcus Haber	36 (4)	9	1	0	1	0	1	1	39 (4)	10
10	MF	AUS	Bradden Inman	33 (6)	10	1	0	1	0	1	0	36 (6)	10
11	FW	ENG	George Cooper	13 (14)	1	0 (1)	0	0 (1)	0	1	0	14 (16)	1
12	FW	FIN	Lauri Dalla Valle	10 (4)	2	0 (1)	0	1	0	0 (1)	0	11 (6)	2
13	GK	WAL	David Richards	0	0	0	0	0	0	0	0	0	0
14	FW	WAL	Callum Saunders	6 (12)	2	1	0	0	0	0	0	7 (12)	2
15	MF	ENG	David Fox	39	2	0	0	1	0	1	0	41	2
16	MF	SCO	Adam King	22 (2)	4	1	0	1	1	0	0	24 (2)	5
17	DF	SCO	Stephen Kingsley	9 (3)	0	0	0	0	0	0	0	9 (3)	0
18	MF	ENG	Billy Bingham	17 (4)	0	0	0	1	0	0	0	18 (4)	0
19	DF	ENG	James Baillie	1 (3)	0	0	0	0	0	0 (1)	0	1 (4)	0
20	MF	SCO	James Jones	29 (2)	0	1	0	0	0	0	0	30 (2)	0
21	MF	ENG	Ryan Wintle	0 (3)	0	0	0	0	0	0	0	0 (3)	0
22	ST	SCO	Fraser Murdoch	0	0	0	0	0	0	0	0	0	0
23	DF	ENG	Perry Ng	1 (5)	0	0	0	0	0	0	0	1 (5)	0
24	FW	WAL	Harry Wilson	3 (4)	0	0	0	0	0	0	0	3 (4)	0
25	MF	ENG	Callum Ainley	6 (10)	1	0	0	0	0	0 (1)	0	6 (11)	1
27	FW	ENG	Ryan Colclough	10 (2)	2	0	0	0 (1)	0	1	1	11 (3)	3
28	DF	ENG	Toby Mullarkey	0	0	0	0	0	0	0	0	0	0
29	DF	NGA	Semi Ajayi	13	0	0	0	0	0	0	0	13	0
30	GK	AUS	Danijel Nizic	0	0	0 (1)	0	0	0	0	0	0 (1)	0
32	MD	ENG	Joe Howell	0 (2)	0	0	0	0	0	0	0	0 (2)	0
33	FW	ENG	Ryan Seager	3 (1)	1	0	0	0	0	0	0	3 (1)	1
36	FW	ENG	Tom Hitchcock	6 (1)	0	0	0	0	0	0	0	6 (1)	0
39	FW	NGA	Daniel Udoh	1 (5)	0	0	0	0	0	0	0	1 (5)	0
41	DF	CIV	Zoumana Bakayogo	16 (6)	0	0	0	0	0	0	0	16 (6)	0

Source: Soccerbase and 11v11.com Numbers in parentheses denote appearances as substitute. Players with number struck through and marked † left the club during the playing season.

=== Top scorers ===
Place	Position	Nationality	Number	Name	League One	FA Cup	League Cup	Football League Trophy	Total
1	MF	(Australia)	10	Bradden Inman	5,000	1,000	1,000	500	7,500
1	FW	(Canada)	9	Marcus Haber	9	0	0	1	10
3	MF	(Scotland)	16	Adam King	4	0	1	0	5
4	MF	(England)	27	Ryan Colclough	2	0	0	1	3
5	FW	(Finland)	12	Lauri Dalla Valle	2	0	0	0	2
5	MF	(England)	15	David Fox	2	0	0	0	2
5	FW	(Wales)	14	Callum Saunders	2	0	0	0	2
8	MF	(England)	25	Callum Ainley	1	0	0	0	1
8	DF	(Ivory Coast)	11	Zoumana Bakayogo	1	0	0	0	1
8	FW	(England)	11	George Cooper	1	0	0	0	1
8	DF	(England)	3	Jon Guthrie	1	0	0	0	1
8	DF	(England)	6	Ben Nugent	1	0	0	0	1
8	FW	(England)	33	Ryan Seager	1	0	0	0	1
8	DF	(England)	2	Ollie Turton	1	0	0	0	1
TOTALS					38	0	1	2	41

Source: Soccerbase and 11v11.com

=== Disciplinary record ===
Number	Nationality	Position	Name	League One		FA Cup		League Cup		Football League Trophy		Total	
Number	Nationality	Position	Name	Yellow card	Red card	Yellow card	Red card	Yellow card	Red card	Yellow card	Red card	Yellow card	Red card
6	(England)	DF	Ben Nugent	8	0	1	0	0	0	0	0	9	0
5	(Wales)	DF	George Ray	7	0	0	0	0	0	0	0	7	0
2	(England)	DF	Ollie Turton	6	0	0	0	0	0	0	0	6	0
20	(Scotland)	MF	James Jones	4	0	0	0	0	0	0	0	4	0
15	(England)	MF	David Fox	3	0	0	0	0	0	0	0	3	0
3	(England)	DF	Jon Guthrie	3	0	0	0	0	0	0	0	3	0
9	(Canada)	FW	Marcus Haber	3	0	0	0	1	0	0	0	3	0
29	(Nigeria)	DF	Semi Ajayi	2	0	0	0	0	0	0	0	2	0
41	(Ivory Coast)	DF	Zoumana Bakayogo	2	0	0	0	0	0	0	0	2	0
27	(England)	FW	Ryan Colclough	1	0	0	0	1	0	0	0	2	0
14	(Wales)	FW	Callum Saunders	1	0	1	0	0	0	0	0	2	0
1	(England)	GK	Ben Garratt	1	0	0	1	0	0	0	0	1	1
8	(England)	MF	Chris Atkinson	1	0	0	0	0	0	0	0	1	0
19	(England)	DF	James Baillie	1	0	0	0	0	0	0	0	1	0
16	(England)	MF	Billy Bingham	1	0	0	0	0	0	0	0	1	0
11	(England)	FW	George Cooper	1	0	0	0	0	0	0	0	1	0
4	(England)	DF	Harry Davis	1	0	0	0	0	0	0	0	1	0
16	(Scotland)	MF	Adam King	1	0	0	0	0	0	0	0	1	0
23	(England)	DF	Perry Ng	1	0	0	0	0	0	0	0	1	0
Total				47	0	2	1	2	0	0	0	51	1

Source: Soccerbase and 11v11.com

=== Clean sheets ===
Place	Nationality	Number	Name	League One	FA Cup	League Cup	Football League Trophy	Total
1	(England)	1	Ben Garratt	7	0	0	0	7
TOTALS				7	0	0	0	7

Source: 11v11.com (Ben Garratt)

== Competitions ==
=== Pre-season friendlies ===
On 7 May 2015, Crewe Alexandra announced they would travel to Nantwich Town for a pre-season friendly on 19 July 2015. On 13 May 2015, a further six friendlies were announced against, Congleton Town, Alsager Town, Newcastle Town, Kidsgrove Athletic, Altrincham and Kirby Muxloe. On 18 June 2015, a friendly against Chester was announced.

10 July 2015 Friendly	Congleton Town	1–3	Crewe Alexandra	Congleton
19:45 BST	Smith 66'	Report	Dalla Valle 29'; Coulibaly 87'; Saunders 89'	Stadium: Richborough Estates Stadium

11 July 2015 Friendly	Alsager Town	1–7	Crewe Alexandra	Alsager
15:00 BST	79'	Report	Coulibaly 4', 34'; Turton 14'; Saunders 41'; Inman 47'; Dalla Valle 55'; Baillie 64'	Stadium: Wood Park Stadium

17 July 2015 Friendly	Newcastle Town	0–3	Crewe Alexandra	Newcastle-under-Lyme
19:30 BST		Report	Atkinson 22'; Brennan 41'; O'Neill 90'	Stadium: Lyme Valley Stadium

19 July 2015 Friendly	Nantwich Town	1–4	Crewe Alexandra	Nantwich
14:00 BST	Ray 33' (o.g.)	Report	Davis 7'; Dalla Valle 55'; Cooper 76'; Saunders 81'	Stadium: The Weaver Stadium; Attendance: 1,067

22 July 2015 Friendly	Kidsgrove Athletic	1–2	Crewe Alexandra	Kidsgrove
19:30 BST	Woolley 32'	Report	Saunders 13'; Ng 69'	Stadium: The Novus Stadium

24 July 2015 Friendly	Altrincham	0–3	Crewe Alexandra	Altrincham
19:30 BST		Report	Inman 1', 55'; Wintle 77'	Stadium: Moss Lane; Attendance: 390

1 August 2015 Friendly	Chester	3–2	Crewe Alexandra	Chester
15:00 BST	Rooney 4'; Hannah 57'; Peers 74'	Report	Turton 21'; Cooper 72'	Stadium: Lookers Vauxhall Stadium

3 August 2015 Friendly	Kirby Muxloe	0–3	Crewe Alexandra	Kirby Muxloe
19:30 BST		Report	Howell 2'; Cooper 7'; Atkinson 74'	Stadium: Ratby Lane

=== League One ===
==== League table ====
Pos	Team	Pld	W	D	L	GF	GA	GD	Pts	Promotion, qualification or relegation
20	Shrewsbury Town	46	13	11	22	58	79	−21	50	
21	Doncaster Rovers (R)	46	11	13	22	48	64	−16	46	Relegation to EFL League Two
22	Blackpool (R)	46	12	10	24	40	63	−23	46	Relegation to EFL League Two
23	Colchester United (R)	46	9	13	24	57	99	−42	40	Relegation to EFL League Two
24	Crewe Alexandra (R)	46	7	13	26	46	83	−37	34	Relegation to EFL League Two

Updated to match(es) played on 1 July 2016. Source: BBC Sport
Rules for classification: 1) Points; 2) Goal difference; 3) Number of goals scored
(R) Relegated

==== Matches ====
On 17 June 2015, the fixtures for the forthcoming season were announced.

8 August 2015 1	Crewe Alexandra	0–0	Port Vale	Crewe
15:00 BST		Report		Stadium: Gresty Road; Attendance: 6,751; Referee: Dean Whitestone

15 August 2015 2	Scunthorpe United	2–0	Crewe Alexandra	Scunthorpe
15:00 BST	Madden 10', 65'	Report		Stadium: Glanford Park; Attendance: 3,188; Referee: Trevor Kettle

18 August 2015 3	Coventry City	3–2	Crewe Alexandra	Coventry
19:45 BST	Fleck 14'; Armstrong 51'; O'Brien 83'	Report	Inman 31'; Haber 53'	Stadium: Ricoh Arena; Attendance: 11,511; Referee: Tim Robinson

22 August 2015 4	Crewe Alexandra	3–3	Bury	Crewe
15:00 BST	King 3'; Colclough 37'; Inman 80'	Report	Mayor 23'; Soares 45'; Rose 58'	Stadium: Gresty Road; Attendance: 4,125; Referee: Oliver Langford

29 August 2015 5	Wigan Athletic	1–0	Crewe Alexandra	Wigan
15:00 BST	Jacobs 12'	Report		Stadium: DW Stadium; Attendance: 8,647; Referee: David Coote

5 September 2015 6	Crewe Alexandra	1–3	Swindon Town	Crewe
15:00 BST	King 61'	Report	Smith 63'; Thomas 82'; Ajose 90'	Stadium: Gresty Road; Attendance: 4,400; Referee: Richard Clark

12 September 2015 7	Crewe Alexandra	1–3	Millwall	Crewe
15:00 BST	Dalla Valle 36'	Report	O'Brien 21', 64', 74'	Stadium: Gresty Road; Attendance: 4,293; Referee: Darren Handley

19 September 2015 8	Shrewsbury Town	0–1	Crewe Alexandra	Shrewsbury
15:00 BST		Report	King 2'	Stadium: New Meadow; Attendance: 5,481; Referee: Andy Madley

26 September 2015 9	Walsall	1–1	Crewe Alexandra	Bescot
15:00 BST	Bradshaw 3'	Report	Nugent 18'	Stadium: Bescot Stadium; Attendance: 4,229; Referee: James Linington

29 September 2015 10	Crewe Alexandra	1–2	Southend United	Crewe
19:45 BST	Inman 49'	Report	Pigott 47', 53'	Stadium: Gresty Road; Attendance: 3,404; Referee: Darren Bond

3 October 2015 11	Crewe Alexandra	1–2	Chesterfield	Crewe
15:00 BST	Fox 36'	Report	Gardner 8', 57'	Stadium: Gresty Road; Attendance: 4,053; Referee: Ross Joyce

10 October 2015 12	Barnsley	1–2	Crewe Alexandra	Barnsley
15:00 BST	Mawson 16'	Report	Ryan Colclough 14'; Lauri Dalla Valle 79'	Stadium: Oakwell; Attendance: 8,406; Referee: Mark Brown

17 October 2015 13	Crewe Alexandra	0–1	Gillingham	Crewe
15:00 BST		Report	Donnelly 90+2'	Stadium: Gresty Road; Attendance: 3,924; Referee: David Webb

20 October 2015 14	Burton Albion	0–0	Crewe Alexandra	Burton upon Trent
19:45 BST		Report		Stadium: Pirelli Stadium; Attendance: 2,666; Referee: Seb Stockbridge

24 October 2015 15	Blackpool	2–0	Crewe Alexandra	Blackpool
15:00 BST	White 64'; Redshaw 87' (pen.)	Report		Stadium: Bloomfield Road; Attendance: 6,970; Referee: Mark Haywood

31 October 2015 16	Crewe Alexandra	1–0	Sheffield United	Crewe
15:00 GMT	Colclough 71'	Report		Stadium: Gresty Road; Attendance: 5,227; Referee: Fred Graham

14 November 2015 17	Bradford	2–0	Crewe Alexandra	Bradford
15:00 GMT	Liddle 45+2'; B. Clarke 58'	Report		Stadium: Valley Parade; Attendance: 17,546; Referee: Geoff Eltringham

21 November 2015 18	Crewe Alexandra	1–5	Peterborough	Crewe
15:00 GMT	Colclough 64'	Report	Taylor 6'; Washington 46'; Anderson 47', 82'; Angol 54'	Stadium: Gresty Road; Attendance: 4,094; Referee: Charles Breakspear

24 November 2015 19	Colchester	2–3	Crewe Alexandra	Colchester
19:45 GMT	Harriott 40'; Moncur 48'	Report	Colclough 61'; Haber 80'; Lowe 90+3'	Stadium: Colchester Community Stadium; Attendance: 2,602; Referee: Chris Sarginson

28 November 2015 20	Crewe Alexandra	1–0	Oldham Athletic	Crewe
15:00 GMT	King 21'	Report		Stadium: Gresty Road; Attendance: 3,969; Referee: Simon Hooper

12 December 2015 21	Doncaster Rovers	3–2	Crewe Alexandra	Crewe
15:00 GMT	Grant 32'; Stewart 90+3'; Williams 90+5'	Report	Haber 26'; Saunders 90'	Stadium: Gresty Road; Attendance: 5,342; Referee: Darren Drysdale

19 December 2015 22	Crewe Alexandra	1–1	Fleetwood Town	Crewe
15:00 GMT	Lowe 5'	Report	Ball 10'	Stadium: Gresty Road; Attendance: 3,749; Referee: Andy Madley

28 December 2015 24	Crewe Alexandra	1–2	Shrewsbury Town	Crewe
15:00 GMT	Colclough 26'; Haber (yellow card) 55'	Report	Cole 11'; Gerrard (yellow card) 64'; Whalley 90'	Stadium: Gresty Road; Attendance: 5,506; Referee: (England) Andy Haines

2 January 2016 25	Crewe Alexandra	0–5	Coventry City	Crewe
15:00 GMT		Report	Armstrong 11' 30' (pen.) 45'; Murphy 27' 85'	Stadium: Gresty Road; Attendance: 5,946; Referee: (England) Mark Haywood

16 January 2016 26	Swindon Town	4–3	Crewe Alexandra	Swindon
15:00 GMT	Ajose 14' 90+1'; Obika 47'; Nugent 52' (o.g.)	Report	Inman 20' 40'; Colclough 26'; Jones (yellow card) 26'; Nugent (yellow card) 28'; Turton (yellow card) 62'	Stadium: County Ground; Attendance: 6,888; Referee: (England) Lee Collins

23 January 2016 27	Crewe Alexandra	1–1	Wigan Athletic	Crewe
15:00 GMT	Inman 43'; Cooper (yellow card) 63'	Report	Wabara 16'; Perkins (yellow card) 47'; McCann (yellow card) 53'; Power (yellow card) 59'	Stadium: Gresty Road; Attendance: 6,010; Referee: (England) Nick Kinseley

26 January 2016 28	Bury	0–0	Crewe Alexandra	Bury
19:45 GMT	O'Sullivan (yellow card) 65'; Etuhu (yellow card) 88'	Report	Guthrie (yellow card) 63'	Stadium: Gigg Lane; Attendance: 2,343; Referee: Darren England

30 January 2016 29	Millwall	1–1	Crewe Alexandra	London
15:00 GMT	Archer (yellow card) 59'; Gregory 64' (pen.); Williams (yellow card) 89'	Report	Inman 59' (pen.); Nugent (yellow card) 63'; Ajayi (yellow card) 86'	Stadium: The Den; Attendance: 9,044; Referee: (England) Chris Kavanagh

6 February 2016 30	Crewe Alexandra	2–0	Rochdale	Crewe
15:00 GMT	Fox (yellow card) 7'; Haber 31'; Inman 45'	Report	Rafferty (yellow card) 49'; Lund (yellow card) 57'	Stadium: Gresty Road; Attendance: 4,130; Referee: (England) Ross Joyce

13 February 2016 31	Crewe Alexandra	1–1	Walsall	Crewe
15:00 GMT	Inman 49'	Report	Bradshaw 32' (pen.)	Stadium: Gresty Road; Attendance: 5,132; Referee: (England) Darren Handley

16 February 2016 23	Rochdale	2–2	Crewe Alexandra	Rochdale
19:45 GMT	Bennett 2'; Bunney 6'; Lund (yellow card) 45+6'; Rose (yellow card) 45+6'	Report	Haber 24'; Seager 27'; Bakayogo (yellow card) 45+5'	Stadium: Spotland Stadium; Attendance: 1,985; Referee: (England) Eddie Ilderton

20 February 2016 32	Chesterfield	3–1	Crewe Alexandra	Chesterfield
15:00 GMT	Ebanks-Blake 7'; Novak 12'; Dimaio 56'	Report	Jones (yellow card) 20'; Bakayogo 27'; Guthrie (yellow card) 87'	Stadium: Proact Stadium; Attendance: 6,264; Referee: (England) Gavin Ward

27 February 2016 33	Crewe Alexandra	1–2	Barnsley	Crewe
15:00 GMT	Fox (yellow card) 5'; Guthrie 32'; Nugent (yellow card) 66'	Report	Bree (yellow card) 45+1'; Winnall 53'; Watkins (yellow card) 62'; Mawson 67' (yellow card) 67'; Isgrove (yellow card) 69'	Stadium: Gresty Road; Attendance: 4,451; Referee: (England) Seb Stockbridge

1 March 2016 34	Southend United	1–1	Crewe Alexandra	Southend-on-Sea
19:45 GMT	Wordsworth (yellow card) 58'; Worrall (yellow card) 86'; Barnett (yellow card) 87'; Coker (yellow card) 87'; Payne 90+4' (pen.)	Report	Hitchcock (yellow card) 54'; Cooper 86'	Stadium: Roots Hall; Attendance: 5,444; Referee: (England) Dean Whitestone

5 March 2016 35	Crewe Alexandra	1–1	Burton Albion	Crewe
15:00 GMT	Haber 14'; Turton (yellow card) 32'; Jones (yellow card) 70'; Ng (yellow card) 80'; Nugent (yellow card) 87'	Report	Akins 35'; McCrory (yellow card) 90+1'	Stadium: Alexandra Stadium; Attendance: 4,380; Referee: (England) Peter Bankes

12 March 2016 36	Gillingham	3–0	Crewe Alexandra	Gillingham, Kent
15:00 GMT	Samuel 12'; El-Abd (yellow card) 38'; Guthrie 61' (o.g.); Wright 90+2'	Report	Nugent (yellow card) 67'	Stadium: MEMS Priestfield Stadium; Attendance: 5,656; Referee: (England) Keith Hill

19 March 2016 37	Crewe Alexandra	1–2	Blackpool	Crewe
15:00 GMT	Haber (yellow card) 47' (goal) 83'	Report	Redshaw 34' (yellow card) 35' (yellow-red card); Aldred 84'; Potts (yellow card) 90+5'	Stadium: Alexandra Stadium; Attendance: 4,480; Referee: (England) Kevin Johnson

25 March 2016 38	Sheffield United	3–2	Crewe Alexandra	Sheffield
15:00 GMT	Adams 18'; Flynn 61'; Sharp 87'; Calvert-Lewin (yellow card) 90+7'	Report	Guthrie (yellow card) 58'; Fox 68'; Davis 82'	Stadium: Bramall Lane; Attendance: 18,539; Referee: (England) Andy Woolmer

28 March 2016 39	Crewe Alexandra	0–1	Bradford City	Crewe
15:00 GMT	Ray (yellow card) 62'	Report	Proctor 50'; McMahon (yellow card) 70'	Stadium: Alexandra Stadium; Attendance: 5,320; Referee: (England) Kevin Wright

2 April 2016 40	Peterborough United	3–0	Crewe Alexandra	Peterborough
15:00 GMT	Beautyman 14' 40' (yellow card) 55'; Fox (yellow card) 23'; Angol 67'	Report	Bakayogo (yellow card) 12'	Stadium: ABAX Stadium; Attendance: 4,881; Referee: (England) Lee Collins

9 April 2016 41	Port Vale	3–0	Crewe Alexandra	Burslem
15:00 GMT	Dodds 3' 83'; Streete (yellow card) 73'; Hooper 90+2'	Report	Ray (yellow card) 1'	Stadium: Vale Park; Attendance: 5,771; Referee: (England) Paul Tierney (referee)

16 April 2016 42	Crewe Alexandra	2–3	Scunthorpe United	Crewe
15:00 GMT	Turton 15'; Ainley (yellow card) 71'; Haber 79'	Report	Williams 43' 75'; Adelakun 64'	Stadium: Alexandra Stadium; Attendance: 3,852; Referee: Darren England

19 April 2016 43	Crewe Alexandra	1–1	Colchester United	Crewe
19:45 GMT	Turton (yellow card) 26'; Saunders 90+1'; Ray (yellow card) 90+3'	Report	Edwards (yellow card) 25'; Moncur 65' (pen.)	Stadium: Alexandra Stadium; Attendance: 3,094; Referee: (England) Scott Duncan (referee)

23 April 2016 44	Oldham Athletic	1–0	Crewe Alexandra	Oldham
15:00 GMT	Forte 59'; Croft (yellow card) 65'	Report	Ray (yellow card) 39'; Turton (yellow card) 81'	Stadium: Boundary Park; Attendance: 4,571; Referee: (England) Michael Bull

30 April 2016 45	Crewe Alexandra	3–1	Doncaster Rovers	Crewe
15:00 GMT	Ainley 43'; Haber 57'; Inman 89'	Report	Rowe 28'	Stadium: Alexandra Stadium; Attendance: 4,403; Referee: (England) Lee Swabey

8 May 2016 46	Fleetwood Town	2–0	Crewe Alexandra	Fleetwood
12:30 GMT	Grant 21'; Cole 24'	Report		Stadium: Highbury Stadium; Attendance: 3,302

=== FA Cup ===
7 November 2015 First round	Crewe Alexandra	0–1	Eastleigh	Crewe
15:00	Garratt (red card) 63'	Report	Strevens 75' (pen.)	Stadium: Gresty Road; Attendance: 3,008; Referee: Carl Boyeson

=== League Cup ===
On 16 June 2015, the first round draw was made, Crewe Alexandra were drawn at home against Preston North End.

12 August 2015 First round	Crewe Alexandra	1–3	Preston North End	Crewe
19:45 BST	King 36'	Report	Hugill 5'; Keane 13'; Brownhill 86'	Stadium: Gresty Road; Attendance: 2,852; Referee: Scott Duncan

=== Football League Trophy ===
On 5 September 2015, the second round draw was shown live on Soccer AM and drawn by Charlie Austin and Ed Skrein. Crewe will host Wigan Athletic.

6 October 2015 Second round	Crewe Alexandra	2–3	Wigan Athletic	Crewe
19:45 BST	Haber 6'; Colclough 36'	Report	Hiwula 10', 70'; Wildschut 76'	Stadium: Gresty Road; Attendance: 2,168; Referee: James Adcock

=== Cheshire Senior Cup ===
On the Cheshire FA website the preliminary round details were announced, Crewe Alex will face Witton Albion.

27 October 2015 Preliminary round	Crewe Alexandra	5–0	Witton Albion	Crewe
19:45 BST	Ryan Wintle 41'; Liam O'Neil 45'; Saunders; Andre Brown	Report		Stadium: Gresty Road

3 February 2016 First Round	Crewe Alexandra	6–0	Altrincham	Crewe
19:45 BST	Joe Howell 19'; Andre Brown 23'; Charlie Kirk 50'; Baillie 60'; Saunders 80'	Report		Stadium: Gresty Road

9 February 2016 Second round	Stockport County	4–1	Crewe Alexandra	Stockport
19:45 BST	Karl Ledsham 2'; Montrose 16'; Brodie 59'; John Mardsen 90+1'	Report	Saunders 18'	Stadium: Edgeley Park
