= George Ray (footballer, born 1993) =

Footballer (born 1993)

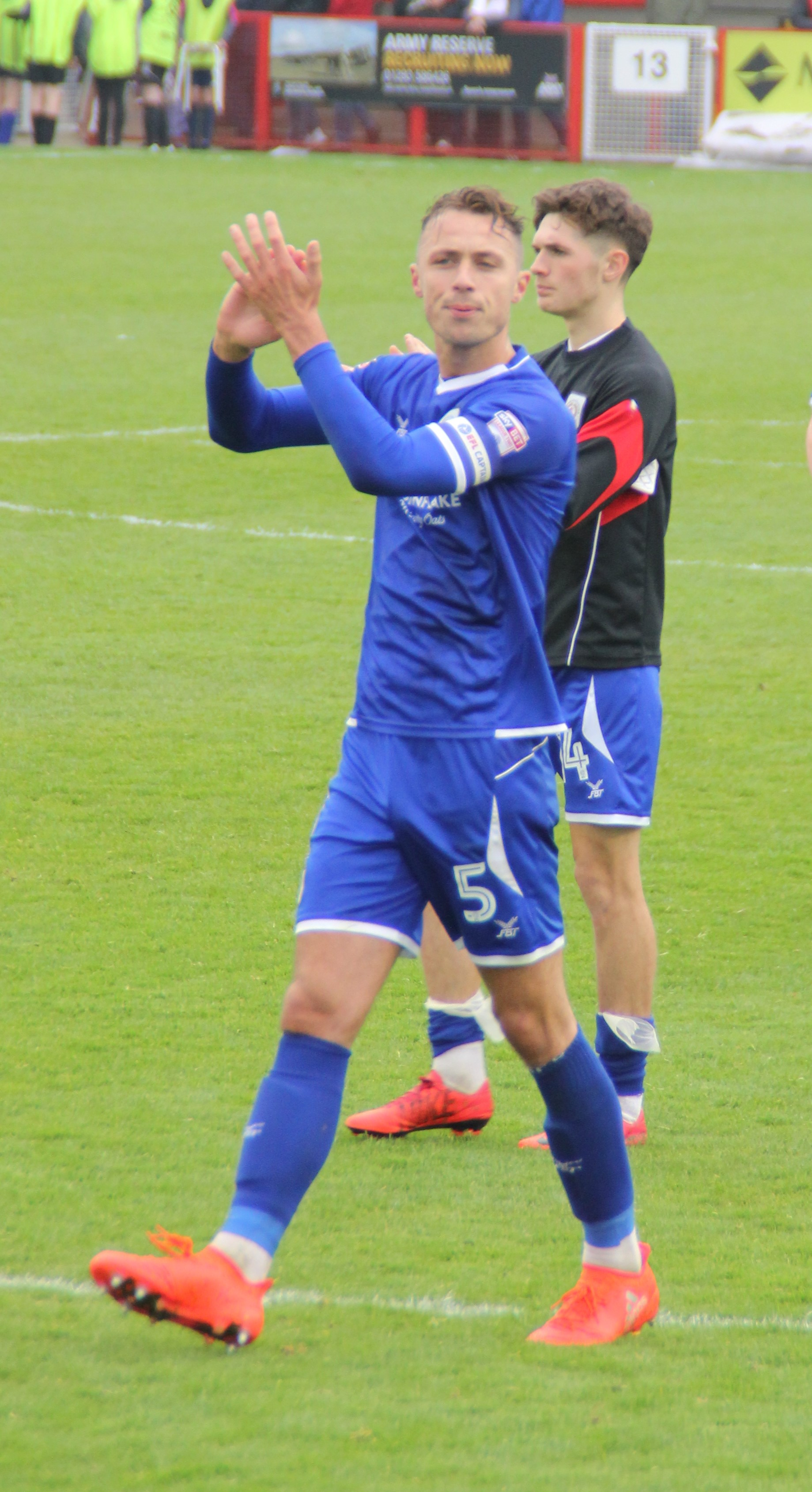
- Ray with Crewe Alexandra in 2018

Personal information
- Full name: George Edward Ray
- Date of birth: 13 October 1993 (age 33)
- Place of birth: Warrington, England
- Height: 6 ft 4 in (1.93 m)
- Position: Defender

Youth career
- 2004–2011: Crewe Alexandra

Senior career*
Years	Team	Apps	(Gls)
2011–2019	Crewe Alexandra	137	(5)
2012	→ Leek Town (loan)	12	(1)
2019–2021	Tranmere Rovers	26	(1)
2021–2022	Exeter City	19	(1)
2022	→ Leyton Orient (loan)	9	(0)
2022–2024	Barrow	77	(3)
2024–2025	Morecambe	2	(0)
Total		282	(11)

International career^{‡}
2013–2014	Wales U21	5	(0)
- * Club domestic league appearances and goals as of 16:57, 14 May 2025 (UTC) ‡ National team caps and goals as of 23:21, 5 September 2014 (UTC)

George Edward Ray (born 13 October 1993) is a former professional footballer who played as a defender. He is a former Wales under-21 international.

Ray started his professional career at Crewe Alexandra and made his first-team debut in the 2013 Football League Trophy final, becoming the first player to make his professional debut in a cup final held at Wembley. He later played for Tranmere Rovers, Exeter City, Leyton Orient (loan), Barrow and Morecambe.

== Club career ==
=== Crewe Alexandra ===
Ray came through the Crewe Alexandra F.C. Academy to sign professional forms in 2011. He was loaned out to Northern Premier League side Leek Town in the 2011–12 season. He made his senior debut for the "Railwaymen" at Wembley Stadium on 7 April 2013, in the Football League Trophy final victory over Southend United – the first player to make his professional debut in a Wembley cup final. On 11 February 2014, Ray signed a new two-and-a-half-year deal at Crewe Alexandra.

In March 2017, Ray revealed that he had considered leaving Crewe, declaring "the first six months (of the current season) were the worst times of my career," but was now playing for a new contract under Crewe's new manager. David Artell had replaced Steve Davis in January 2017 and he recalled Ray to the first team and then made him team captain following an injury to Danny Hollands in February 2017. On 9 May 2017, Crewe announced that Ray had been offered a new contract by the club, and in June 2017 he signed a two-year deal running to June 2019.

Ray suffered a back injury at the end of the 2016–17 season that required prolonged treatment and kept him out of first-team action until early 2018. He made his first appearance of the season at Lincoln City on 24 February 2018. On 5 May 2018, Ray appeared in a Crewe starting 11 who were all Crewe Academy graduates, one of two players (with Ben Garratt) to feature both times this has been achieved. At the end of the 2018–19 season, he declined a new deal and was set to leave the club.

=== Tranmere Rovers ===
On 24 June 2019, Ray signed a two-year deal with League One side Tranmere Rovers, becoming Micky Mellon's first signing of the season. He made his debut in an opening day loss to Rochdale. He scored his first goal for the club in an EFL Trophy tie against Aston Villa U21 on 8 October 2019.

=== Exeter City ===
On 28 June 2021, Ray joined League Two side Exeter City on a free transfer following his release from Tranmere Rovers. He made his debut on the opening day of the season, helping his new side keep a clean sheet in a goalless draw with Bradford City. He scored his first goal for the club on 27 November 2021, in a 1–1 draw with Rochdale.

==== Leyton Orient (loan) ====
On 31 January 2022, Ray joined League Two Leyton Orient on loan until the end of the 2021–22 season.

=== Barrow ===
On 27 June 2022, Ray joined League Two club Barrow on a two-year deal having had his Exeter contract terminated by mutual consent. On 1 May 2024, the club said Ray had been released.

=== Morecambe ===
Ray was one of 15 free agents that signed for League Two club Morecambe on 12 July 2024, after the club's embargo on registering new players was lifted. Ray announced his retirement at the end of the 2024–25 season.

== International career ==
Ray was called up to the Wales under-21 side in March 2013, at the age of 19.

== Personal life ==
Following his retirement, Ray moved to Dubai to start a career in real estate.

== Career statistics ==
As of end of 2024–25 season

Appearances and goals by club, season and competition
Club	Season	League			FA Cup		League Cup		Other		Total	
Club	Season	Division	Apps	Goals	Apps	Goals	Apps	Goals	Apps	Goals	Apps	Goals
Leek Town (loan)	2011–12	NPL Division One North	12	1	0	0	—		1 (Note: Appearance in Staffordshire Senior Cup)	1	13	2
Crewe Alexandra	2012–13	League One	4	0	0	0	0	0	1 (Note: Appearance(s) in Football League Trophy)	0	5	0
Crewe Alexandra	2013–14	League One	9	0	0	0	1	0	0	0	10	0
Crewe Alexandra	2014–15	League One	35	2	0	0	2	0	0	0	37	2
Crewe Alexandra	2015–16	League One	22	0	1	0	1	0	1	0	25	0
Crewe Alexandra	2016–17	League Two	23	1	0	0	2	0	2 (Note: Appearances in EFL Trophy)	0	27	1
Crewe Alexandra	2017–18	League Two	12	0	0	0	0	0	0	0	12	0
Crewe Alexandra	2018–19	League Two	32	2	1	0	0	0	3	0	36	2
Crewe Alexandra	Total		137	5	2	0	6	0	7	0	152	5
Tranmere Rovers	2019–20	League One	15	0	1	0	1	0	4	1	21	1
Tranmere Rovers	2020–21	League Two	11	1	1	0	0	0	6	0	18	1
Tranmere Rovers	Total		26	1	2	0	1	0	10	1	39	2
Exeter City	2021–22	League Two	19	1	3	0	1	0	0	0	23	1
Leyton Orient (loan)	2021–22	League Two	9	0	0	0	0	0	0	0	9	0
Barrow	2022–23	League Two	36	0	1	0	0	0	3	0	40	0
Barrow	2023–24	League Two	41	3	2	0	1	0	1	0	45	3
Barrow	Total		77	3	3	0	1	0	4	0	85	3
Morecambe	2024–25	League Two	2	0	0	0	0	0	1	0	3	0
Career total			282	11	10	0	9	0	23	2	324	13

== Honours ==
Crewe Alexandra

- Football League Trophy: 2012–13

Tranmere Rovers

- EFL Trophy runner-up: 2020–21
