= George Cooper (footballer, born 1996) =

English footballer

George Iain Cooper (born 30 October 1996) is an English professional footballer who plays as a midfielder for Western Springs AFC. He started his career at Crewe Alexandra, having come through their academy.

== Career ==
=== Crewe Alexandra ===
Cooper graduated through the Crewe Alexandra Academy to sign a three-year professional contract in April 2014. Aged 17, he made his first team debut for Crewe Alexandra on 2 September 2014, replacing Bradden Inman 71 minutes into a 3–0 defeat to Rochdale in a Football League Trophy first round match. On 26 September 2014, Cooper made his first league appearance for Crewe Alexandra in a 6–1 defeat at the hands of Milton Keynes Dons. On 11 October 2014, he scored his first goal for Crewe in a 2–1 victory over Coventry City.

In April 2017, Crewe triggered a contract extension clause keeping Cooper at Crewe until June 2018.

=== Peterborough United ===
In January 2018, he signed for Peterborough United on a three-and-a-half-year contract for an undisclosed fee. He scored on his Peterborough debut, in a 3–0 win against Oldham Athletic.

==== Plymouth Argyle (loan) ====
On 29 August 2019, Cooper joined League Two side Plymouth Argyle on a season-long loan deal. He played the majority of the season at left wing-back, and finished the season with a recorded 12 assists, as Argyle were promoted to League One.

Upon his return to Peterborough, Cooper was transfer-listed and left out of Posh's 'Salary Cap Squad', along with George Boyd, Jason Naismith and Louis Reed.

=== Plymouth Argyle ===
On 2 September 2020, Cooper re-joined Argyle, this time permanently, for an undisclosed fee. He signed a three-year contract.

=== Chesterfield ===
On 27 June 2022, Cooper's contract at Plymouth Argyle was cancelled by mutual consent and he subsequently joined Chesterfield on a free transfer.

=== Warrington Rylands ===
On 24 February 2023, Cooper signed for Northern Premier League Premier Division club Warrington Rylands.

=== Preston Lions ===
On 19 June 2023, Cooper signed for National Premier Leagues Victoria 2 club Preston Lions.

=== Return to England ===
A year later, in June 2024, Cooper returned to English non-league football, signing for North West Counties Football League Premier Division side West Didsbury & Chorlton.

In October 2025, he joined Northern Premier League Division One West club Kidsgrove Athletic. The following month, he joined Nantwich Town.

=== Auckland United ===
In March 2026, Cooper joined NRFL Premier club Western Springs AFC.

== Career statistics ==
As of match played 5 November 2022

Appearances and goals by club, season and competition
Club	Season	Division	League		FA Cup		League Cup		Other (Note: Appearances in Football League Trophy)		Total	
Club	Season	Division	Apps	Goals	Apps	Goals	Apps	Goals	Apps	Goals	Apps	Goals
Crewe Alexandra	2014–15	League One	22	3	2	0	0	0	1	0	25	3
Crewe Alexandra	2015–16	League One	27	1	1	0	1	0	1	0	30	1
Crewe Alexandra	2016–17	League Two	46	9	2	0	2	0	3	1	53	10
Crewe Alexandra	2017–18	League Two	27	1	3	0	1	0	3	0	34	1
Crewe Alexandra	Total		122	14	8	0	4	0	8	1	142	15
Peterborough United	2017–18	League One	13	2	0	0	0	0	0	0	13	2
Peterborough United	2018–19	League One	21	2	2	0	1	0	5	1	29	3
Peterborough United	Total		34	4	2	0	1	0	5	1	42	5
Plymouth Argyle (loan)	2019–20	League Two	27	3	2	0	0	0	2	0	31	3
Plymouth Argyle	2020–21	League One	12	1	1	0	2	0	2	1	17	2
Plymouth Argyle	2021–22	League One	1	0	1	0	1	0	0	0	3	0
Plymouth Argyle	Total		13	1	2	0	3	0	2	1	20	2
Chesterfield	2022–23	National League	8	0	1	0	0	0	0	0	9	0
Career total			190	20	15	0	8	0	19	3	244	25

== Honours ==
Individual

- League One Apprentice Award: 2014–15
