= James Baillie (footballer) =

English footballer (born 1996)

Personal information
- Full name: James Baillie
- Date of birth: 27 March 1996 (age 30)
- Place of birth: Warrington, England
- Positions: Central attacking midfielder; winger

Team information
- Current team: Ashton United

Youth career
- –2014: Crewe Alexandra

Senior career*
Years	Team	Apps	(Gls)
2014–2016	Crewe Alexandra	38	(0)
2016	→ Nantwich Town (loan)		
2016–2020	Curzon Ashton	101	(5)
2020–2022	Warrington Town	59	(3)
2022–	Ashton United	35	(4)
- * Club domestic league appearances and goals as of 12:44, 15 June 2022 (UTC)

James Baillie (born 27 March 1996) is an English footballer who plays for Ashton United. He previously played in the Football League for Crewe Alexandra.

== Career ==
Baillie began his career with Crewe Alexandra and signed a professional contract with the club in May 2014. He made his Football League debut on 9 August 2014 in a 2–1 defeat away at Fleetwood Town.

In March 2016 he joined Nantwich Town on loan.

in September 2016 he signed for Curzon Ashton. On 30 October 2018, he suffered a broken leg in a fixture against Southport and missed almost a year. Before his return to Curzon Ashton first team action, he had loan spells with Abbey Hey and Mossley to help with his recovery.

After spending four years at Curzon, he signed for Northern Premier League Premier Division side Warrington Town, making nine appearances before the 2020–21 campaign was curtailed. He re-signed for another season in July 2021.

In June 2022, Baillie joined Ashton United.

== Career statistics ==
As of match played 16 November 2019

Appearances and goals by club, season and competition
Club	Season	League			FA Cup		League Cup		Other		Total	
Club	Season	Division	Apps	Goals	Apps	Goals	Apps	Goals	Apps	Goals	Apps	Goals
Crewe Alexandra	2014–15	League One	13	0	1	0	0	0	0	0	14	0
Crewe Alexandra	2015–16	League One	3	0	0	0	0	0	1 (Note: Appearance in the Football League Trophy)	0	4	0
Crewe Alexandra	Crewe total		16	0	1	0	0	0	1	0	18	0
Curzon Ashton	2016–17	National League North	30	1	5	0	—		0	0	35	1
Curzon Ashton	2017–18	National League North	40	1	0	0	—		0	0	40	1
Curzon Ashton	2018–19	National League North	10	0	0	0	—		0	0	10	0
Curzon Ashton	2019–20	National League North	5	0	0	0	—		0	0	5	0
Curzon Ashton	Curzon Ashton total		85	2	5	0	0	0	0	0	90	2
Career total			101	2	6	0	0	0	1	0	108	3
