= Ryan Colclough =

English footballer (born 1994)

Personal information
- Full name: Ryan Paul Colclough
- Date of birth: 27 December 1994 (age 31)
- Place of birth: Burslem, England
- Height: 1.80 m (5 ft 11 in)
- Position: Winger

Team information
- Current team: Southend United
- Number: 27

Youth career
- 2011–2012: Crewe Alexandra

Senior career*
Years	Team	Apps	(Gls)
2012–2016	Crewe Alexandra	60	(12)
2016–2018	Wigan Athletic	46	(6)
2016–2017	→ Milton Keynes Dons (loan)	18	(5)
2018–2020	Scunthorpe United	37	(2)
2020–2023	Altrincham	91	(26)
2023–2025	Chesterfield	89	(17)
2025–2026	AFC Fylde	10	(4)
2026–	Southend United	12	(2)
- * Club domestic league appearances and goals as of 3 October 2026 (UTC)

Ryan Paul Colclough (born 27 December 1994) is an English professional footballer who plays for National League club Southend United.

== Career ==
=== Crewe Alexandra ===
Colclough was born in the town of Burslem in Stoke-on-Trent. He started his career with Crewe Alexandra progressing through the academy to sign a two-year scholarship in the summer of 2011. He was promoted to the first team in September 2012, after impressing in pre-season games and for the under-21s. He made his professional debut for Crewe on 22 September 2012, in a 1–1 draw with Leyton Orient in Football League One, coming on as a substitute for Brendon Daniels. He scored his first goal for the club on 26 January 2013, in a 3–1 defeat to AFC Bournemouth. On 17 August, he scored twice in a 2–1 win against Tranmere Rovers.

On 23 November 2013 Colclough was tasered by police after becoming involved in an altercation with a night club bouncer and was subsequently found guilty of affray and ordered to pay £580 in fines and costs. After an unsuccessful trial with Wolverhampton Wanderers, on Thursday 6 August 2015 Colclough signed a new two-year contract with Crewe to take him through to the summer of 2017.

=== Wigan Athletic ===
Colclough joined Wigan Athletic in January 2016. Colclough scored his first goal for Wigan against Bury on 27 February 2016.

On 31 August 2016, Colclough joined League One side Milton Keynes Dons on a season-long loan. On 10 September 2016, Colclough scored his first goal for Milton Keynes Dons, in a 1-1 draw away to Bolton Wanderers.

On 24 September 2016, Colclough scored his first career hat-trick in a 1–4 away win over Fleetwood Town.

On 1 January 2017, Wigan Athletic activated a recall clause in Colclough's loan deal with Milton Keynes Dons and returned to his parent club. On 21 November 2017, he scored two goals before being substituted to see the birth of his son.

=== Scunthorpe United ===
On 9 August 2018, Colclough joined League One side Scunthorpe United for an undisclosed fee, signing a three-year deal.

He left the club by mutual consent on 16 October 2020, following an investigation into an assault charge.

=== Altrincham ===
On 24 November 2020, Colclough signed for National League side Altrincham whilst on bail for the assault charge. All charges were dropped after the Crown Prosecution Service ruled there was insufficient evidence for a conviction.

=== Chesterfield ===
On 12 January 2023, Colclough signed for National League side Chesterfield for an undisclosed fee, signing an 18-month deal.

In August 2025, he departed the club after having his contract terminated by mutual consent.

=== AFC Fylde ===
On 9 September 2025, Colclough joined National League North club AFC Fylde on a two-year deal. On 19 January 2026, the club parted company with the player.

=== Southend United ===
In July 2026, Colclough joined National League club Southend United, signing a one-year deal with the option of a further year.

== Controversies and legal issues ==
In 2013, Colclough allegedly punched a nightclub doorman before telling him to "go back to his own country". He was found not guilty.

In 2015, Colclough ran away from the police and hurled abuse at two officers as they approached him in relation to an alleged assault earlier that same night. Colclough was tasered by police after he walked back to them "hunching his shoulders and clenching his fists". Colclough was ordered to pay £580 in fines and costs.

In 2020, Colclough was charged with assault on an emergency services worker and criminal damage after an initial call had been made to report a man acting in a drunk and disorderly manner in a Mexican restaurant in Doncaster.

In 2022, Colclough was fined £2,000 and was ordered to pay £500 in compensation after he assaulted a security officer at a casino in the Isle of Man. Colclough was also sentenced to a five-year exclusion order and to pay prosecution costs of £250.

In December 2024, Colclough pleaded not guilty to a Grievous bodily harm charge, having been said to have assaulted another male in January of the same year. In May 2026, he was found guilty and after spending 7 weeks on remand he was sentenced to 28 months in prison, suspended for two years.

== Career statistics ==
As of end of 2024–25 season

Appearances and goals by club, season and competition
Club	Season	League			FA Cup		League Cup		Other		Total	
Club	Season	Division	Apps	Goals	Apps	Goals	Apps	Goals	Apps	Goals	Apps	Goals
Crewe Alexandra	2012–13	League One	18	1	1	0	0	0	2 (Note: Appearance(s) in Football League Trophy)	0	21	1
Crewe Alexandra	2013–14	League One	8	2	0	0	1	0	1	0	10	2
Crewe Alexandra	2014–15	League One	7	2	0	0	0	0	0	0	7	2
Crewe Alexandra	2015–16	League One	27	7	1	0	1	0	1	1	30	8
Crewe Alexandra	Total		60	12	2	0	2	0	4	1	68	13
Wigan Athletic	2015–16	League One	10	2	—		—		—		10	2
Wigan Athletic	2016–17	Championship	10	0	—		1	0	—		11	0
Wigan Athletic	2017–18	League One	26	4	6	0	2	1	1 (Note: Appearance(s) in EFL Trophy)	1	35	6
Wigan Athletic	Total		46	6	6	0	3	1	1	1	56	8
Milton Keynes Dons (loan)	2016–17	League One	18	5	3	0	—		2	0	23	5
Scunthorpe United	2018–19	League One	17	2	1	0	1	0	2	1	21	3
Scunthorpe United	2019–20	League Two	20	0	1	1	1	0	3	1	25	2
Scunthorpe United	2020–21	League Two	0	0	—		1	0	1	0	2	0
Scunthorpe United	Total		37	2	2	1	3	0	6	2	48	5
Altrincham	2020–21	National League	28	8	—		—		0	0	28	8
Altrincham	2021–22	National League	38	11	2	0	—		1 (Note: Appearance(s) in FA Trophy)	0	41	11
Altrincham	2022–23	National League	25	7	2	0	—		1	0	28	7
Altrincham	Total		91	26	4	0	0	0	2	0	97	26
Chesterfield	2022–23	National League	23	7	0	0	—		2 (Note: Appearance(s) in National League play-offs)	0	25	7
Chesterfield	2023–24	National League	30	7	3	0	—		0	0	33	7
Chesterfield	2024–25	League Two	36	3	2	0	0	0	4 (Note: Two appearances in EFL Trophy, two appearances in EFL League Two play-offs)	0	42	3
Chesterfield	Total		89	17	5	0	0	0	6	0	100	17
Career total			341	68	22	1	8	0	21	4	392	73

== Honours ==
Crewe Alexandra

- Football League Trophy: 2012–13

Wigan Athletic

- EFL League One: 2017–18

Chesterfield

- National League: 2023–24

Individual

- National League Team of the Year: 2022–23
