= Chris Dagnall =

English association football player (born 1986)

Personal information
- Full name: Christopher Dagnall
- Date of birth: 15 April 1986 (age 40)
- Place of birth: Liverpool, England
- Position: Striker

Team information
- Current team: Wythenshawe Town (player-coach)

Youth career
- 1999–2003: Tranmere Rovers

Senior career*
Years	Team	Apps	(Gls)
2003–2006	Tranmere Rovers	39	(7)
2006	→ Rochdale (loan)	21	(3)
2006–2010	Rochdale	135	(51)
2010–2012	Scunthorpe United	60	(9)
2012–2014	Barnsley	53	(6)
2012	→ Bradford City (loan)	7	(1)
2013–2014	→ Coventry City (loan)	6	(1)
2014–2015	Leyton Orient	58	(17)
2015	Kerala Blasters	13	(6)
2015–2016	Hibernian	11	(0)
2016–2018	Crewe Alexandra	73	(21)
2018–2019	Bury	17	(2)
2019	Tranmere Rovers	5	(0)
2019–2020	Yeovil Town	20	(1)
2020	Ashton United	1	(0)
2020–2021	Yeovil Town	23	(1)
2021–2022	Hanley Town	31	(14)
2022–2023	Stalybridge Celtic	26	(5)
2024	Lancaster City	9	(0)
2025–	Wythenshawe Town		
- * Club domestic league appearances and goals as of 17:59, 18 October 2025 (UTC)

Christopher Dagnall (born 15 April 1986) is an English footballer who plays for Midland League Premier Division side Wythenshawe Town, where he holds the role of player-coach.

He began his career at Tranmere Rovers, where he debuted age 17 in 2003. In January 2006 he was loaned to Rochdale, where he moved permanently in the summer. He scored 60 goals across all competitions for the Dale, leaving for Scunthorpe United in 2010 after helping them achieve promotion to League One. In January 2012, he signed for Barnsley, where he struggled and was loaned to Bradford City and Coventry City. He spent 18 months scoring more frequently at Leyton Orient, before moving in 2015 to Kerala Blasters in the Indian Super League, leaving after one season to join Hibernian. Two years at Crewe Alexandra then followed, before he linked up with Bury in the summer of 2018. In January 2019, he rejoined his first club Tranmere Rovers.

== Career ==
=== Tranmere Rovers ===
Dagnall was born in Liverpool and played for Tranmere Rovers from the age of 13 as a trainee. On 13 September 2003, at the age of 17, he was included in a matchday squad for the first time by manager Ray Mathias, coming on as a late substitute for Ryan Taylor in a goalless Second Division match against Peterborough United at Prenton Park, and had a 20-yard shot saved by their goalkeeper Mark Tyler. He went on to make 10 league appearances and one League Cup appearance, and scored his first career goal by equalising in a 3–1 away defeat to Luton Town on 6 October. Tranmere narrowly missed out on the play-offs, finishing in eighth place.

He started the next season on 10 August 2004 by scoring his first Prenton Park goal in a 2–1 home win against Hartlepool United, where he was shown a second yellow card and was sent off for jumping into the crowd. He began to score more frequently finishing the season with six goals, with Tranmere winning every game in which he scored. Tranmere finished the season in third place, however they lost to Hartlepool in the play-offs.

He made several appearances at the start of the following season including his FA Cup debut which was a 2–1 loss away to future club Bradford City. On 13 January 2006 he went on loan to Rochdale of League Two, originally on a temporary basis. He spent the rest of the season at Spotland and scored three goals in 21 appearances, including a last-minute equaliser for a 1–1 draw at Rushden & Diamonds on 15 April.

=== Rochdale ===
In July 2006, Rochdale made the move permanent for an initial fee of £25,000, with manager Steve Parkin seeing Dagnall as a replacement for top scorer Grant Holt, who had signed for Nottingham Forest for £300,000. He made his second debut for Rochdale in a 1–0 loss at home to Walsall, coming on as a late substitute. He scored regularly for Rochdale including braces against Boston United, Wrexham and Peterborough. He scored his first hat-trick in a 5–0 win at Spotland against Macclesfield Town on 21 April 2007. He ended the season with 17 league goals, finishing joint fourth top scorer in the league.

In the following season he received an injury after playing just eight games, which led to a lengthy lay-off. He did not play from September 2007 until March 2008, where he marked his return with a hat-trick in a 4–1 win against Rotherham United in his first game back. In May, he scored in three consecutive games which included a draw at home to Shrewsbury, and in both play-off semi-final legs against Darlington, losing the first game and winning the second a week later. The tie went to penalties which Rochdale won 5–4. However Rochdale lost 3–2 in the final at Wembley to Stockport County. He finished the season with nine league goals, despite only playing 17 games.

His first goal of the 2008–09 season came in a 3–1 home win against Barnet. On 21 October 2008 he scored his third career hat-trick in a 6–1 home win against Chester. On 3 March 2009 Dagnall received the second red card of his career, coming in a 2–1 away defeat to Barnet. He finished the season with 10 goals, helping Rochdale to another play-off semi-final, where they were beaten by Gillingham.

Dagnall scored six goals in the first 10 league games at the start of the 2009–10 season, including a brace against Torquay United on 12 September 2009. On 27 March 2010 he scored another hat-trick, this time in a 4–1 win against Grimsby Town. On 17 April 2010 Rochdale beat Northampton Town 1–0 at home to secure their first promotion for 41 years. He finished the season with 20 goals, his highest ever total.

=== Scunthorpe United ===
On 2 June 2010, Dagnall joined Championship side Scunthorpe United on a free transfer, signing an initial three-year deal. He made his debut on 7 August in a 2–1 win against Reading at the Madjeski Stadium. His first Scunthorpe goals came in the League Cup second round as he scored two goals in a 4–2 win against Sheffield Wednesday on 24 August. His first league goals came two weeks later as he again scored twice, this time in a 4–0 away win against Sheffield United at Bramall Lane. His three other goals in his first season with Scunthorpe came in wins against Preston, Burnley and Nottingham Forest. Scunthorpe were relegated at the end of the season, finishing bottom of the Championship.

He stayed with Scunthorpe as they started the season in League One, and scored his first goal of the season in a 2–0 League Cup away win against Accrington Stanley on 9 August 2011. He followed this up with a goal against Oldham Athletic a week later. In the next round of the League Cup, he scored against Premier League side Newcastle United, as his team lost 2–1 after extra time at Glanford Park. In October, he scored in back-to-back games in the space of four days, in a 2–2 draw against Huddersfield and a 4–2 win against former club Tranmere. His final game was a 2–1 away win against Hartlepool on 2 January 2012.

=== Barnsley ===
On 6 January 2012, Dagnall signed for Championship club Barnsley for an undisclosed fee on a two-and-a-half-year contract. He had formerly played under their manager Keith Hill and his assistant David Flitcroft at Rochdale, with Hill saying: "He's definitely value for money and the type of player that fits in perfectly to what we're trying to achieve at this club" He made his debut on eight days later in a 2–1 away win against Leicester City. He made nine appearances before going out on loan to League Two side Bradford City on 16 March.

On 16 March, Dagnall joined Bradford City on loan until the end of the season. He made his debut the following day against Aldershot Town. Bradford manager Phil Parkinson said: "I'm really pleased to get him on board. He's a good signing for us." On 24 March he made his 300th career appearance in a 2–2 draw against Gillingham at Valley Parade. On 27 March he scored his first goal for Bradford in a home game against Crawley Town, he was also named man of the match.

He scored his first goals for Barnsley when he netted twice in a League Cup tie against former side Rochdale on 12 August 2012. On 12 January 2013, he scored his first league goals for Barnsley, both of them in a 2–0 win against Leeds United.

On 28 November 2013, Dagnall signed for Coventry City on an emergency loan until 5 January 2014. He made his Sky Blues debut two days later away to Milton Keynes Dons, equalising as they came from behind to win 3–1. He was released from his contract at Barnsley, alongside defender Scott Wiseman, on 10 January 2014.

=== Leyton Orient ===
Six days after his release, Dagnall signed for Leyton Orient on an 18-month contract. On his debut for the Londoners at Crewe Alexandra on 18 January, he came on as a substitute for Robbie Simpson at half-time and scored twice in Orient's 2–1 win, which took them to the top of League One. His six goals helped them to the play-offs, where on 13 May, again as a substitute, he scored in a semi-final win over Peterborough (2–1, 3–2 aggregate). 12 days later, in the final at Wembley Stadium, he came on in the 76th minute in place of Kevin Lisbie, and had his attempt saved by Adam Collin as the O's lost the penalty shootout.

On 2 September 2014, Dagnall scored twice in a 3–2 win over Peterborough in the first round of the Football League Trophy. He was sent off on 29 November in a 3–1 loss at former team Bradford, receiving a straight red card for a foul on Billy Knott. With 11 goals, he was the team's top scorer that season, which ended in relegation to League Two.

=== Kerala Blasters ===
Rejecting an offer to extend his contract, Dagnall left Orient to join Indian Super League side Kerala Blasters on 10 June 2015, saying "I've enjoyed my 18 months with the club and the fans were very welcoming, but this will be a new challenge for me." He replaced Iain Hume, who had signed a new contract with Atlético de Kolkata.

He made his debut on 6 October, as his new team began the season with a 3–1 win over NorthEast United FC at the Jawaharlal Nehru Stadium, being replaced by compatriot Sanchez Watt at half time. A week later, he scored his first goal, an 83rd-minute consolation in a 2–1 loss at Atlético de Kolkata. On 15 November, he scored twice in a 4–1 win at NorthEast United, his first coming after 29 seconds making it the quickest in the league's history; he set up the previous record holder, 48 seconds by Mohammed Rafi against FC Pune City.

=== Hibernian ===
On 23 December 2015, Dagnall joined Scottish Championship team Hibernian on a short-term deal until the end of the 2015–16 season. He made his debut on 9 January in a Scottish Cup fourth round 2–0 win against Raith Rovers. Dagnall was an unused substitute as Hibernian won the 2016 Scottish Cup Final.

=== Crewe Alexandra ===
On 5 July 2016, Dagnall joined League Two club Crewe Alexandra on a two-year deal, making his debut in the season's opener at Stevenage, scoring his first Crewe goal in a 3–3 draw against Hartlepool on 16 August, and finishing Crewe's top scorer with 17 goals across all competitions after a final day hat-trick against Barnet on 6 May 2017. The following season, he made 37 appearances, scoring seven goals, but, on 9 May 2018, Crewe manager David Artell announced Dagnall would not be offered a new contract at the club.

=== Bury ===
On 19 June 2018, he signed a one-year contract with Bury to link up once again with Shakers manager Ryan Lowe, whom he had played alongside when the two had been teammates at Crewe.

=== Tranmere Rovers ===
Dagnall was released by Bury in January 2019 and he rejoined Tranmere Rovers until the end of the 2018–19 season.

=== Yeovil Town ===
On 8 October 2019, Dagnall signed for National League side Yeovil Town.

=== Ashton United ===
On 12 October 2020, Dagnall joined Ashton United. He made his debut the following day in a 1–0 defeat to Atherton Collieries where Dagnall was shown a straight red card for his involvement in a melee. This was his only appearance for the club before the early curtailment of the season.

=== Yeovil Town ===
In November 2020, Dagnall returned to Yeovil Town on a deal until the end of the season.

=== Hanley Town ===
On 10 June 2021, Dagnall joined ninth tier Midland Premier League side Hanley Town, linking up with former-Yeovil teammate Carl Dickinson who had been appointed manager.

=== Stalybridge Celtic ===
In October 2022, Dagnall joined Northern Premier League side Stalybridge Celtic he made his debut against FC United of Manchester and would go on to score 5 goals in 26 appearances.

=== Lancaster City ===
It was announced on 28 June 2024, that Chris would be linking up again with his former boss at Stalybridge Celtic, Chris Willcock at Lancaster City. After making 9 appearances, Chris left the club due to work commitments.

=== Wythenshawe Town ===
Dagnall joined Wythenshawe Town as player-coach for the 2025–26 season.

== Career statistics ==
As of match played 29 May 2021

Appearances and goals by club, season and competition
Club	Season	League			National Cup		League Cup		Other		Total	
Club	Season	Division	Apps	Goals	Apps	Goals	Apps	Goals	Apps	Goals	Apps	Goals
Tranmere Rovers	2003–04	Second Division	10	1	0	0	1	0	0	0	11	1
Tranmere Rovers	2004–05	League One	23	6	0	0	0	0	2 (Note: One appearance in Football League Trophy, one appearance in League One play-offs)	0	25	6
Tranmere Rovers	2005–06	League One	6	0	1	0	0	0	1 (Note: Appearance(s) in Football League Trophy)	0	8	0
Tranmere Rovers	Total		39	7	1	0	1	0	3	0	44	7
Rochdale (loan)	2005–06	League Two	21	3	—		—		—		21	3
Rochdale	2006–07	League Two	37	17	2	0	1	0	2	1	42	18
Rochdale	2007–08	League Two	14	7	0	0	2	0	3 (Note: Appearances in League Two play-offs)	2	19	9
Rochdale	2008–09	League Two	39	7	1	1	1	0	4 (Note: Two appearances and one goal in Football League Trophy, two appearances and one goal in League Two play-offs)	2	45	10
Rochdale	2009–10	League Two	45	20	2	0	1	0	1	0	49	20
Rochdale	Total		156	54	5	1	5	0	10	5	176	60
Scunthorpe United	2010–11	Championship	37	5	1	0	3	2	—		41	7
Scunthorpe United	2011–12	League One	23	4	2	0	2	2	0	0	27	6
Scunthorpe United	Total		60	9	3	0	5	4	0	0	68	13
Barnsley	2011–12	Championship	9	0	—		—		—		9	0
Barnsley	2012–13	Championship	36	5	4	3	2	2	—		42	10
Barnsley	2013–14	Championship	8	1	0	0	2	0	—		10	1
Barnsley	Total		53	6	4	3	4	2	—		61	11
Bradford City (loan)	2011–12	League Two	7	1	—		—		—		7	1
Coventry City (loan)	2013–14	League One	6	1	—		—		—		6	1
Leyton Orient	2013–14	League One	20	6	—		—		2 (Note: Appearances in League One play-offs)	1	22	7
Leyton Orient	2014–15	League One	38	11	1	0	1	0	2	2	42	13
Leyton Orient	Total		58	17	1	0	1	0	4	3	64	20
Kerala Blasters	2015	Indian Super League	13	6	—		—		—		13	6
Hibernian	2015–16	Scottish Championship	11	0	3	0	1	0	0	0	15	0
Crewe Alexandra	2016–17	League Two	41	14	1	0	2	2	1 (Note: Appearance(s) in EFL Trophy)	1	45	17
Crewe Alexandra	2017–18	League Two	32	7	3	0	1	0	1	0	37	7
Crewe Alexandra	Total		73	21	4	0	3	2	2	1	82	24
Bury	2018–19	League Two	17	2	0	0	0	0	2	1	19	3
Tranmere Rovers	2018–19	League Two	5	0	—		—		—		5	0
Yeovil Town	2019–20	National League	20	1	2	2	—		3 (Note: Two appearances and one goal in FA Trophy, one appearance in National League play-offs)	1	25	4
Ashton United	2020–21	NPL Premier Division	1	0	0	0	—		0	0	1	0
Yeovil Town	2020–21	National League	23	1	1	0	—		0	0	24	1
Hanley Town	2021–22	Midland League Premier Division	31	14	7	3	—		1 (Note: One appearance in FA Vase)	0	38	17
Career total			573	140	31	9	20	8	25	11	648	168

== Honours ==
Hibernian

- Scottish Cup: 2015–16
- Scottish League Cup runner-up: 2015–16

Bury

- EFL League Two second-place promotion: 2018–19

Tranmere Rovers

- EFL League Two play-offs: 2019

Individual

- Crewe Alexandra Player of the Year: 2016–17
