= Callum Saunders =

Footballer (born 1995)

Personal information
- Full name: Callum Luke Saunders
- Date of birth: 26 September 1995 (age 31)
- Place of birth: Istanbul, Turkey
- Height: 1.78 m (5 ft 10 in)
- Position: Forward

Team information
- Current team: Nantwich Town

Youth career
- –2014: Crewe Alexandra

Senior career*
| Years | Team | Apps | (Gls) |
| 2014–2017 | Crewe Alexandra | 27 | (2) |
| 2017–2018 | Notts County | 3 | (0) |
| 2018–2019 | Nantwich Town | 36 | (10) |
| 2019 | Curzon Ashton | 16 | (2) |
| 2019–2021 | Nantwich Town | 27 | (3) |
| 2021–2022 | Witton Albion | 36 | (17) |
| 2022 | Ashton United | 21 | (6) |
| 2022–2023 | Stafford Rangers | 14 | (4) |
| 2023– | Nantwich Town | 21 | (4) |

International career^{‡}
| 2014 | Wales U19 | 3 | (1) |
| 2015 | Wales U21 | 1 | (0) |
- * Club domestic league appearances and goals as of 14:48, 20 December 2022 (UTC) ‡ National team caps and goals as of 11:35, 13 February 2024(UTC)

Callum Luke Saunders (born 26 September 1995) is a footballer who plays as a forward for semi-professional Northern Premier League Division One West side Nantwich Town. Born in Turkey, he represented Wales internationally at youth levels U19 and 21.

== Club career ==
Saunders began his career in the Crewe Alexandra Academy and signed a professional contract with the club in June 2014. He made his Football League debut on 9 August 2014 in a 2–1 defeat away at Fleetwood Town, and scored his first Crewe goal at Doncaster on 12 December 2015. On 9 May 2017, Crewe announced that Saunders had been released by the club.

He then signed for Notts County at the beginning of the 2017–18 season but was released at the end of the season.

Saunders signed for Northern Premier League side Nantwich Town on the eve of the 2018–19 season, scoring 10 goals in 36 games, before joining Curzon Ashton in the summer of 2019. He then returned to Nantwich Town in November 2019.

He signed for Northern Premier League Premier League side Witton Albion on a free transfer in September 2021.

Saunders signed for Ashton United in June 2022. On 19 December 2022, Saunders left Ashton United by mutual consent and joined Stafford Rangers. He returned to Nantwich Town ahead of the 2023–2024 season.

== International career ==
Saunders has represented Wales at under-17 and under-19 level, and made his under-21 debut on 17 November 2015, coming on as an 87th-minute substitute against Romania.

== Personal life ==
Saunders was born in Istanbul when his father, former professional footballer Dean Saunders, was playing for the Turkish club Galatasaray.

== Career statistics ==
As of match played 3 December 2022

Appearances and goals by club, season and competition
| Club | Season | League | | | FA Cup | | League Cup | | Other (Note: Includes Football League Trophy.) | | Total | |
| Club | Season | Division | Apps | Goals | Apps | Goals | Apps | Goals | Apps | Goals | Apps | Goals |
|---|---|---|---|---|---|---|---|---|---|---|---|---|
| Crewe Alexandra | 2014–15 | League One | 4 | 0 | 1 | 0 | 0 | 0 | 1 | 0 | 6 | 0 |
| Crewe Alexandra | 2015–16 | League One | 18 | 2 | 1 | 0 | 0 | 0 | 0 | 0 | 19 | 2 |
| Crewe Alexandra | 2016–17 | League One | 5 | 0 | 1 | 0 | 2 | 0 | 2 | 0 | 10 | 0 |
| Crewe Alexandra | Total | | 27 | 2 | 3 | 0 | 2 | 0 | 3 | 0 | 35 | 2 |
| Notts County | 2017–18 | League Two | 3 | 0 | 0 | 0 | 0 | 0 | 3 | 0 | 6 | 0 |
| Nantwich Town | 2018–19 | Northern Premier League | 36 | 10 | 0 | 0 | 0 | 0 | 0 | 0 | 36 | 10 |
| Curzon Ashton | 2019–20 | National League North | 16 | 2 | 0 | 0 | 0 | 0 | 0 | 0 | 16 | 2 |
| Nantwich Town | 2019–20 | Northern Premier League | 11 | 2 | 0 | 0 | 0 | 0 | 3 | 5 | 14 | 7 |
| Nantwich Town | 2020–21 | Northern Premier League | 5 | 0 | 2 | 2 | 0 | 0 | 4 | 3 | 11 | 5 |
| Nantwich Town | 2021–22 | Northern Premier League | 5 | 0 | 0 | 0 | 0 | 0 | 0 | 0 | 5 | 0 |
| Nantwich Town | Total | | 21 | 2 | 2 | 2 | 0 | 0 | 7 | 8 | 30 | 12 |
| Curzon Ashton | 2021–22 | Northern Premier League | 36 | 17 | 1 | 0 | 0 | 0 | 2 | 1 | 39 | 18 |
| Ashton United | 2022–23 | Northern Premier League | 21 | 6 | 2 | 0 | — | | 1 | 0 | 24 | 6 |
| Career total | | | 160 | 39 | 8 | 2 | 2 | 0 | 16 | 9 | 186 | 50 |
