= 2014–15 Crewe Alexandra F.C. season =

Crewe Alexandra
2014–15 season
- Chairman: John Bowler
- Manager: Steve Davis
- Stadium: Alexandra Stadium
- League One: 20th
- FA Cup: First round
- League Cup: Second round
- Football League Trophy: First round
- Top goalscorer: League: Marcus Haber (7); All: Marcus Haber (8)
Home colours	Away colours

During the 2014–15 English football season, Crewe Alexandra F.C. competed in Football League One, their 91st season in the English Football League.

== Match details ==
=== Pre-season ===
11 July 2014	Norton United	0–4	Crewe Alexandra	Smallthorne
19:30 BST		Report	Pogba 13'; Grant 25'; Inman 45'; Orenuga 75' (pen.)	Stadium: Norton Cricket Club & Miners Welfare Institute

13 July 2014	Nantwich Town	1–4	Crewe Alexandra	Nantwich
15:00 BST	Jones 12'	Report	Inman 4'; Waters 28'; Phillips 30'; Saunders 52'	Stadium: The Weaver Stadium

19 July 2014	Chester	1–1	Crewe Alexandra	Chester
15:00 BST	Rooney 68'	Report	Atkinson 28'	Stadium: Deva Stadium; Attendance: 1,134

26 July 2014	Crewe Alexandra	0–1	Wolverhampton Wanderers	Crewe
15:00 BST		Report	Dicko 90+2'	Stadium: Gresty Road

29 July 2014	Southport	1–2	Crewe Alexandra	Southport
19:45 BST	Evans 63'	Report	Turton 3'; Waters 23'	Stadium: Haig Avenue

=== League One ===
==== League table ====
Pos	Team	Pld	W	D	L	GF	GA	GD	Pts	Promotion, qualification or relegation
18	Port Vale	46	15	9	22	55	65	−10	54	
19	Colchester United	46	14	10	22	58	77	−19	52	
20	Crewe Alexandra	46	14	10	22	43	75	−32	52	
21	Notts County (R)	46	12	14	20	45	63	−18	50	Relegation to Football League Two
22	Crawley Town (R)	46	13	11	22	53	79	−26	50	Relegation to Football League Two

Updated to match(es) played on 3 May 2015. Source: BBC Sport
Rules for classification: 1) Points; 2) Goal difference; 3) Number of goals scored
(R) Relegated

==== Matches ====
The fixtures for the 2014–15 season were announced on 18 June 2014 at 9am.

9 August 2014 1	Fleetwood Town	2–1	Crewe Alexandra	Fleetwood
15:00	Ball 47'; Proctor 54'; Hogan (yellow card) 90+3'	Report	Inman (yellow card) 79' (goal) 90+4' (pen.)	Stadium: Highbury Stadium; Attendance: 3,774; Referee: Gary Sutton

16 August 2014 2	Crewe Alexandra	1–2	Barnsley	Crewe
15:00	Waters 22'; Oliver (yellow card) 63'		Lita 57'; Winnall (yellow card) 71'; Cranie (yellow card) 73' (goal) 75'	Stadium: Gresty Road; Attendance: 4,502; Referee: Andy Davies

19 August 2014 3	Crewe Alexandra	2–5	Rochdale	Crewe
19:45	Haber 9' 62'; Ness (yellow card) 74'		Henderson 31'; Done 42' 55' 72'; Héry (yellow card) 57'; Vincenti 66'; Rafferty (yellow card) 85'	Stadium: Gresty Road; Attendance: 3,742; Referee: Keith Stroud

23 August 2014 4	Swindon Town	2–0	Crewe Alexandra	Swindon
15:00	Kasim 34'; Williams 77'	Report		Stadium: County Ground; Attendance: 6,530; Referee: Lee Collins

30 August 2014 5	Gillingham	2–0	Crewe Alexandra	Gillingham
15:00	Dack 18'; McDonald 45+1'	Report		Stadium: Priestfield Stadium; Attendance: 4,998; Referee: Andrew Madley

13 September 2014 6	Crewe Alexandra	2–1	Port Vale	Crewe
15:00	Ray 6'; Oliver 19'	Report	Slew 32'	Stadium: Gresty Road; Attendance: 6,357; Referee: Simon Hooper

16 September 2014 7	Yeovil Town	1–1	Crewe Alexandra	Yeovil
19:45	Moore 72'	Report	Waters 62'	Stadium: Huish Park; Attendance: 3,509; Referee: Michael Bull

20 September 2014 8	Milton Keynes Dons	6–1	Crewe Alexandra	Milton Keynes
15:00	Alli 3' 48' 84'; Grigg 16'; Afobe 70'; Reeves 90'		McFadzean 7' (o.g.); Ray (yellow card) 54'	Stadium: Stadium mk Attendance: 7,049; Referee: Darren Bond

27 September 2014 9	Crewe Alexandra	0–3	Colchester United	Crewe
15:00		Report	Sears 57'; Healey 63'; Watt 67'	Stadium: Gresty Road; Attendance: 3,909; Referee: Eddie Ilderton

30 September 2014 10	Crewe Alexandra	0–3	Notts County	Crewe
19:45	Grant (yellow card) 17'; Atkinson (yellow card) 76'	Report	Cassidy 44', 62'; Tate 52' (o.g.); Thompson (yellow card) 66'	Stadium: Gresty Road; Attendance: 3,495; Referee: Keith Hill

4 October 2014 11	Bradford City	2–0	Crewe Alexandra	Bradford
15:00	Davies (yellow card) 35'; Liddle (yellow card) 63' (goal) 74'; McLean 72'	Report	Dugdale (yellow card) 74'	Stadium: Valley Parade; Attendance: 12,386; Referee: Darren Deadman

11 October 2014 12	Crewe Alexandra	2–1	Coventry City	Crewe
15:00	Brandy 26'; Cooper 32'; Dugdale (yellow card) 35'; Grant (yellow card) 48'; Ray (yellow card) 57'; Inman (yellow card) 78'	Report	Fleck (yellow card) 20'; Finch (yellow card) 31' (yellow-red card) 82'; Grant 48' (o.g.)	Stadium: Gresty Road; Attendance: 5,058; Referee: Charles Breakspear

18 October 2014 13	Walsall	0–1	Crewe Alexandra	Walsall
15:00		Report	Cooper (yellow card) 56'; Turton (yellow card) 70'; Dugdale 84'	Stadium: Bescot Stadium; Attendance: 4,127; Referee: Darren Handley

21 October 2014 14	Crewe Alexandra	1–0	Peterborough United	Crewe
19:45	Turton (yellow card) 26'; Haber 31' (pen.); Grant (yellow card) 86'; Cooper (yellow card) 90'	Report	Bostwick (red card) 30'; Payne (yellow card) 66'; Baldwin (yellow card) 83' (yellow-red card) 90+5'	Stadium: Gresty Road; Attendance: 3,524; Referee: Jeremy Simpson

25 October 2014 15	Crewe Alexandra	0–1	Sheffield United	Crewe
15:00	Grant (yellow card) 10'; Ray (red card) 87'	Report	Basham (yellow card) 51'; Scougall 69'; McNulty (yellow card) 90+9'; Wallace (yellow card) 90+11'	Stadium: Gresty Road; Attendance: 5,699; Referee: Peter Bankes

1 November 2014 16	Crawley Town	1–1	Crewe Alexandra	Crawley
15:00	McLeod 68'	Report	Cooper 19'	Stadium: Broadfield Stadium; Attendance: 2,329; Referee: Brendan Malone

15 November 2014 17	Crewe Alexandra	0–0	Chesterfield	Crewe
15:00	Turton (yellow card) 80'	BBC Report	Evatt (yellow card) 22'; Morsy (yellow card) 45'	Stadium: Gresty Road; Attendance: 4,557; Referee: Chris Kavanagh

22 November 2014 18	Leyton Orient	4–1	Crewe Alexandra	Leyton
15:00	Plasmati 23'; Wright (yellow card) 27'; Omozusi (yellow card) 34'; Dagnall 35'; Cox (yellow card) 42' (goal) 61'; Vincelot (yellow card) 75'; Mooney 86'	Report	Grant 70'; Cooper (yellow card) 84'	Stadium: Brisbane Road; Attendance: 5,516; Referee: Steve Martin

29 November 2014 19	Crewe Alexandra	1–1	Doncaster Rovers	Crewe
15:00	Ikpeazu 30'; Ness (yellow card) 66'	Report	Butler (yellow card) 38'; Coppinger 80'	Stadium: Gresty Road; Attendance: 4,530; Referee: Charles Breakspear

13 December 2014 20	Scunthorpe United	2–1	Crewe Alexandra	Scunthorpe
15:00	Williams 10'; Llera 77'	Report	Ajose 30'; Ness (yellow card) 77'; Leigh (yellow card) 90+2'	Stadium: Glanford Park; Attendance: 3,006; Referee: Darren Sheldrake

20 December 2014 21	Crewe Alexandra	1–0	Bristol City	Crewe
15:00	Ikpeazu (yellow card) 45+2'; Ray (yellow card) 53'; Ness 74'	Report	Williams (yellow card) 29' (yellow-red card) 50'	Stadium: Gresty Road; Attendance: 4,927; Referee: Andy Haines

26 December 2014 22	Oldham Athletic	1–2	Crewe Alexandra	Oldham
15:00	Elokobi 75'	Report	Ray (red card) 56'; Grant (yellow card) 67'; Ajose 70' (pen.), 86'	Stadium: Boundary Park; Attendance: 4,782; Referee: Jeremy Simpson

28 December 2014 23	Crewe Alexandra	1–1	Preston North End	Crewe
15:00	Cooper 81'	Report	Beckford 83'	Stadium: Gresty Road; Attendance: 6,429; Referee: Seb Stockbridge

10 January 2015 24	Crewe Alexandra	3–1	Gillingham	Crewe
15:00	Ajose 27' (pen.); Davis 32'; Ikpeazu 84'	Report	Legge (yellow card) 30'; Ehmer (yellow card) 34'; Dack 55'; McDonald (yellow card) 85'	Stadium: Gresty Road; Attendance: 4,436; Referee: Mark Brown

17 January 2015 25	Notts County	2–1	Crewe Alexandra	Nottingham
15:00	Mullins (yellow card) 23'; Hollis (yellow card) 35'; Noble 45+5' (pen.) (yellow card) 48' (yellow-red card) 90+5'; Daniels 86'	Report	Guthrie (yellow card) 45+4'; Ness 47'; Dugdale (yellow card) 55'	Stadium: Meadow Lane; Attendance: 4,643; Referee: Iain Williamson

24 January 2015 26	Port Vale	0–1	Crewe Alexandra	Burslem
15:00	O'Connor (yellow card) 51'	Report	Ajose 39'; Davis (yellow card) 82'	Stadium: Vale Park; Attendance: 8,002; Referee: Gavin Ward

31 January 2015 27	Crewe Alexandra	0–5	Milton Keynes Dons	Crewe
15:00	Stewart (yellow card) 75'	Report	Cole 12', 38'; Bowditch 28'; McFadzean (yellow card) 34'; Alli (yellow card) 36'; Spence (yellow card) 55'; Baker 72'; Powell 90'	Stadium: Gresty Road; Attendance: 4,319; Referee: Kevin Wright

7 February 2015 28	Colchester United	2–3	Crewe Alexandra	Colchester
15:00	Porter 45+1'; Eastman (yellow card) 59'; Marriott 84'	Report	Davis (yellow card) 2'; Jones 68'; Ajose 73'; Grant 81'	Stadium: Colchester Community Stadium; Attendance: 3,134; Referee: Tim Robinson

10 February 2015 29	Crewe Alexandra	1–0	Yeovil Town	Crewe
19:45	Ray (yellow card) 21'; Ajose 38'; Ness (yellow card) 63'	Report	Arthurworrey (yellow card) 59'; Berrett (yellow card) 69'	Stadium: Gresty Road; Attendance: 3,523; Referee: Darren Handley

14 February 2015 30	Crewe Alexandra	2–0	Fleetwood Town	Crewe
15:00	Ajose 42'; Haber 59'	Report	McLaughlin (yellow card) 20'	Stadium: Gresty Road; Attendance: 4,135; Referee: Stuart Attwell

17 February 2015 31	Doncaster Rovers	2–1	Crewe Alexandra	Doncaster
19:45	Furman 62'; Wellens 90'	Report	Ray 8'; Tate (yellow card) 61'	Stadium: Keepmoat Stadium; Attendance: 6,164; Referee: Darren Sheldrake

21 February 2015 32	Barnsley	2–0	Crewe Alexandra	Barnsley
15:00 GMT	Nyatanga 66'; Rachubka 79' (o.g.)	Report	Grant (yellow card) 65'; Jones (yellow card) 78'	Stadium: Oakwell; Attendance: 8,635; Referee: Darren Deadman

28 February 2015 33	Crewe Alexandra	0–0	Swindon Town	Crewe
15:00 GMT		Report		Stadium: Gresty Road; Attendance: 4,781; Referee: Graham Salisbury

3 March 2015 34	Rochdale	4–0	Crewe Alexandra	Rochdale
19:45 GMT	Bennett (yellow card) 29'; Henderson 38' (pen.) 73' (pen.); Bunney 57' 80'	Report	Davis (yellow card) 26'	Stadium: Spotland Stadium; Attendance: 1,954; Referee: (England) Paul Tierney (referee)

7 March 2015 35	Crewe Alexandra	2–0	Scunthorpe United	Crewe
15:00 GMT	Leigh 54'; Haber 55'	Report	Osbourne (yellow card) 19'	Stadium: Gresty Road; Attendance: 4,213; Referee: (England) Richard Clark

14 March 2015 36	Preston North End	5–1	Crewe Alexandra	Preston, Lancashire
15:00 GMT	Garner 11' 24' 72' 79'; Welsh (yellow card) 66'; Beckford 82'	Report	Turton 34'	Stadium: Deepdale; Attendance: 10,203; Referee: (England) Chris Kavanagh

17 March 2015 37	Bristol City	3–0	Crewe Alexandra	Bristol
19:45 GMT	Wilbraham 32'; Flint 42'; Emmanuel-Thomas 84'	Report	Ikpeazu (yellow card) 45+1'	Stadium: Ashton Gate; Attendance: 10,719; Referee: (England) Trevor Kettle

21 March 2015 38	Crewe Alexandra	0–1	Oldham Athletic	Crewe
15:00 GMT		Report	Brown (yellow card) 38'; Wilkinson 74'	Stadium: Gresty Road; Attendance: 4,669; Referee: (England) Patrick Miller

28 March 2015 39	Sheffield United	1–2	Crewe Alexandra	Sheffield
15:00 GMT	Davies (yellow card) 54'; Holt 55'; Davies (yellow card) 89'	Report	Dalla Valle 12'; Tate (yellow card) 45'; Atkinson (yellow card) 67'; Colclough 90'	Stadium: Bramall Lane; Attendance: 19,672; Referee: (England) James Adcock

3 April 2015 40	Crewe Alexandra	0–0	Crawley Town	Crewe
15:00 GMT	Grant (yellow card) 42'; Colclough (yellow card) 78'	Report	Wordsworth (yellow card) 66'; Oyebanjo (yellow card) 90+2'	Stadium: Gresty Road; Attendance: 5,353; Referee: (England) Carl Boyeson

6 April 2015 41	Chesterfield	1–0	Crewe Alexandra	Chesterfield
15:00 GMT	Darikwa 26'	Report	Ness (yellow card) 42'; Jones (yellow card) 54'	Stadium: Proact Stadium; Attendance: 6,942; Referee: (England) Kevin Johnson

11 April 2015 42	Crewe Alexandra	1–1	Leyton Orient	Crewe
15:00 GMT	Dalla Valle 10'; Tate (yellow card) 54'	Report	Henderson 30'; McAnuff (yellow card) 70'	Stadium: Gresty Road; Attendance: 4,419; Referee: (England) Dean Whitestone

14 April 2015 43	Peterborough United	1–1	Crewe Alexandra	Peterborough
19:45 GMT	Bostwick (yellow card) 18'; Washington 66'; Norris (yellow card) 81'	Report	Dalla Valle 3' (yellow card) 44'; Grant (yellow card) 19'; Leigh (yellow card) 34'; Guthrie (yellow card) 81'	Stadium: London Road Stadium; Attendance: 4,338; Referee: (England) Andy Woolmer

18 April 2015 44	Crewe Alexandra	1–1	Walsall	Crewe
15:00 GMT	Haber 13'	Report	Bradshaw 81'	Stadium: Gresty Road; Attendance: 4,644; Referee: (England) Scott Duncan

25 April 2015 45	Coventry City	1–3	Crewe Alexandra	Coventry
15:00 GMT	Proschwitz 85'; Johnson (yellow card) 86'	Report	Dalla Valle 23'; Colclough 35'; Haber 73'	Stadium: Ricoh Arena; Attendance: 13,983; Referee: (England) Chris Sarginson

3 May 2015 46	Crewe Alexandra	0–1	Bradford City	Crewe
12:15 GMT	Grant (yellow card) 85'; Davis (yellow card) 90+3'	Report	Clarke 23' (yellow card) 83'; Anthony McMahon (yellow card) 79'; Stead (yellow card) 86'	Stadium: Gresty Road; Attendance: 7,608; Referee: (England) Tony Harrington

=== FA Cup ===
The draw for the first round of the FA Cup was made on 27 October 2014.

8 November 2014 First round	Crewe Alexandra	0–0	Sheffield United	Crewe
15:00	Davis (yellow card) 52'; Grant (yellow card) 74'	Report		Stadium: Gresty Road; Attendance: 3,222; Referee: Mick Russell

18 November 2014 First round replay	Sheffield United	2–0	Crewe Alexandra	Sheffield
19:45	Flynn 19', 77'	Report	Guthrie (yellow card) 83'; Turton (yellow card) 87'	Stadium: Bramall Lane; Attendance: 5,987; Referee: Geoff Eltringham

=== League Cup ===
The draw for the first round was made on 17 June 2014 at 10am. Crewe Alexandra were drawn at away to Barnsley.

12 August 2014 Round One	Barnsley	0–2	Crewe Alexandra	Barnsley
19:45		Report	Waters 32'; Tootle 84'	Stadium: Oakwell; Attendance: 4,391; Referee: Chris Sarginson

26 August 2014 Round Two	Crewe Alexandra	2–3 (a.e.t.)	Bolton Wanderers	Crewe
19:45	Inman 2'; Haber 90+8'	Report	Pratley 40'; Beckford 90+2', 107'	Stadium: Gresty Road; Attendance: 2,642; Referee: Tony Harrington

=== Football League Trophy ===
2 September 2014 Round One	Crewe Alexandra	0–3	Rochdale	Crewe
19:30		Report	Done 42'; Vincenti 64'; Andrew 88'	Stadium: Gresty Road; Attendance: 1,529; Referee: Scott Duncan

== Transfers ==
=== In ===
No.	Pos.	Nat.	Name	Age	EU	Moving from	Type	Transfer window	Ends	Transfer fee	Source
1	GK	(Scotland)	Scott Shearer	33	EU	Rotherham United	Free transfer	Summer	2016	Free	
8	MF	(England)	Chris Atkinson	22	EU	Huddersfield Town	Free transfer	Summer	2016	Free	
25	FW	(Canada)	Marcus Haber	25	EU	Stevenage	Free transfer	Summer	2016	Free	
12	FW	(Finland)	Lauri Dalla Valle	23	EU	Sint-Truiden (Belgium)	Free transfer	During season	2016	Free	
33	DF	(England)	Anthony Stewart	22	EU	Wycombe Wanderers	Free transfer	Winter	2015	Free	
44	GK	(England)	Paul Rachubka	33	EU	Oldham Athletic	Free transfer	During season	2015	Free	

=== Out ===
No.	Pos.	Nat.	Name	Age	EU	Moving to	Type	Transfer window	Transfer fee	Source
5	DF	(England)	Mark Ellis	25	EU	Shrewsbury Town	Released	Summer	Free	
10	FW	(England)	A-Jay Leitch-Smith	24	EU	Yeovil Town	Released	Summer	Free	
3	DF	(England)	Kelvin Mellor	23	EU	Plymouth Argyle	Released	Summer	Free	
11	MF	(England)	Byron Moore	25	EU	Port Vale	Released	Summer	Free	
8	MF	(Ghana)	Abdul Osman	27	EU	Partick Thistle (Scotland)	Released	Summer	Free	
1	GK	(England)	Steve Phillips	36	EU	Nantwich Town	Released	Summer	Free	
9	FW	(Guinea)	Mathias Pogba	23	EU	Pescara (Italy)	Transfer	Summer	Undisclosed	
7	FW	(England)	Max Clayton	20	EU	Bolton Wanderers	Transfer	Summer	£300,000	
21	MF	(England)	Lee Molyneux	25	EU	Tranmere Rovers	Free transfer	Winter	Free	
6	DF	(England)	Adam Dugdale	27	EU	Tranmere Rovers	Free transfer	Winter	Free	

EU = if holds or not a European Union passport; Country: when 2 flags, 1st flag = country that plays for internationally, 2nd flag = country of birth; N = number on jersey; P = Position (for position name, pause mouse pointer on abbreviation); Name = Name on jersey (for more extensive name, pause mouse pointer on name); Age = age on the day of the signing; Moving from = only indicate the club the player was playing before start playing for this club in this season, for the type of the moving see Status column; Moving to = only indicates the club the player is going to play next, for the type of the moving see Status column; Ends = when the player's current contract ends; n/a = Not applicable.

=== Loans in ===
No.	Pos.	Name	Country	Age	Loan club	Started	Ended	Start source	End source
24	DF	Greg Leigh	(England)	19	Manchester City	12 August 2014	30 June 2015		
28	MF	Jamie Ness	(Scotland)	23	Stoke City	14 August 2014	5 January 2015		
29	FW	Febian Brandy	(England)	25	Rotherham United	17 September 2014	25 November 2014		
30	DF	Alan Tate	(England)	32	Swansea City	24 September 2014	24 December 2014		
31	FW	Danny Haynes	(England)	26	Notts County	21 October 2014	25 November 2014		
34	FW	Uche Ikpeazu	(England)	19	Watford	26 November 2014	25 January 2015		
35	FW	Nicky Ajose	(Nigeria)	23	Leeds United	26 November 2014	5 January 2015		
33	DF	Anthony Stewart	(England)	22	Wycombe Wanderers	27 November 2014	6 January 2015		
30	DF	Alan Tate	(England)	32	Swansea City	5 January 2015	30 June 2015		
34	FW	Uche Ikpeazu	(England)	20	Watford	13 March 2015	30 June 2015		

Sources: For loan start source see "Start source". For loan end source see "End source".
EU = if holds or not a European Union passport; Country: when 2 flags, 1st flag = country that plays for internationally, 2nd flag = country of birth; No. = number on jersey; P = Position (for position name, pause mouse pointer on abbreviation); Name = Name on jersey (for more extensive name, pause mouse pointer on name); In/Out = In: The player came in on loan, Out: The player went out on loan; Loan club = the club that the player moved on loan to or the club that the player came from on loan; Started = the date when the player's loan started; Ended = the date when the player's loan ended.

=== Loans out ===
No.	Pos.	Name	Country	Age	Loan club	Started	Ended	Start source	End source
21	MF	Lee Molyneux	(England)	25	Accrington Stanley	3 October 2014	13 January 2015		
15	DF	Thierry Audel	(France)	27	Lincoln City	17 October 2014	17 January 2015		
9	FW	Vadaine Oliver	(England)	23	Mansfield Town	24 October 2014	30 June 2015		
1	GK	Scott Shearer	(Scotland)	33	Burton Albion	2 January 2015	30 June 2015		
23	DF	Perry Ng	(England)	18	Hyde	30 January 2015	2 March 2015		

Sources: For loan start source see "Start source". For loan end source see "End source".
EU = if holds or not a European Union passport; Country: when 2 flags, 1st flag = country that plays for internationally, 2nd flag = country of birth; No. = number on jersey; P = Position (for position name, pause mouse pointer on abbreviation); Name = Name on jersey (for more extensive name, pause mouse pointer on name); In/Out = In: The player came in on loan, Out: The player went out on loan; Loan club = the club that the player moved on loan to or the club that the player came from on loan; Started = the date when the player's loan started; Ended = the date when the player's loan ended.
