= 2019–20 Crewe Alexandra F.C. season =

Crewe Alexandra
2019–20 season
- Chairman: John Bowler
- Manager: David Artell
- Stadium: Gresty Road
- League Two: 2nd
- FA Cup: Third round
- EFL Cup: Second round
- EFL Trophy: Group stage
- Top goalscorer: League: Chris Porter (12); All: Chris Porter (14)

The 2019–20 season was Crewe Alexandra's 143rd season in their history, their 96th in the English Football League and fourth consecutive in League Two. Along with competing in League Two, the club also participated in the FA Cup, EFL Cup and EFL Trophy.

The season covered the period from 1 July 2019 to 30 June 2020.

Crewe vied for promotion to the EFL League One for much of the 2019–20 season, and were top of the table (ahead of Swindon Town on goal difference) when the football season was suspended on 13 March 2020 during the COVID-19 pandemic. On 9 June, Crewe's promotion to League One was confirmed, but Swindon were crowned League Two champions on the basis of average points per game.

== Pre-season ==
The Railwaymen have announced pre-season friendlies against Nantwich Town, Altrincham, Witton Albion, Curzon Ashton Burnley and Wrexham.

| 6 July 2019 Friendly | Nantwich Town | 2–1 | Crewe Alexandra | Nantwich |
| 15:00 BST | Cooke 9'; Lawrie 84' | Report | Powell 58' | Stadium: Weaver Stadium |

| 13 July 2019 Friendly | Altrincham | 0–6 | Crewe Alexandra | Altrincham |
| 15:00 BST | | Report | Nicholls 23', 44'; Kirk 25' (pen.); Finney 62', 67', 82' | Stadium: Moss Lane |

| 16 July 2019 Friendly | Curzon Ashton | 1–5 | Crewe Alexandra | Ashton-under-Lyne |
| 19:45 BST | Davies 84' | Report | Taylor 23'; Kirk 39'; Reilly 52'; Smith 57'; Green 62' | Stadium: Tameside Stadium |

| 16 July 2019 Friendly | Witton Albion | 0–3 | Crewe Alexandra | Wincham |
| 19:45 BST | | Report | Powell 28', 58'; Miller 78' | Stadium: Wincham Park |

| 20 July 2019 Friendly | Crewe Alexandra | 1–0 | Burnley | Crewe |
| 15:00 BST | Kirk 22' | Report | | Stadium: Gresty Road |

| 23 July 2019 Friendly | Bala Town | 2–5 | Crewe Alexandra | Bala |
| 19:45 BST | Venables 64'; Hayes 81' | Report | Kirk 2'; Ainley 11', 74'; Wintle 27'; Reilly 43' | Stadium: Maes Tegid |

| 27 July 2019 Friendly | Wrexham | 0–1 | Crewe Alexandra | Wrexham |
| 15:00 BST | | Report | Kirk 74' | Stadium: Racecourse Ground |

| 30 July 2019 Friendly | Colwyn Bay | 1–5 | Crewe Alexandra U23 | Old Colwyn |
| 19:45 BST | Downes | Report | Reilly (2); Offord; Ainley; Heath | Stadium: Llanelian Road |

== Competitions ==
=== League Two ===
==== League table ====
| Pos | Team | Pld | W | D | L | GF | GA | GD | Pts | PPG | Promotion, qualification or relegation |
|---|---|---|---|---|---|---|---|---|---|---|---|
| 1 | Swindon Town (C, P) | 36 | 21 | 6 | 9 | 62 | 39 | +23 | 69 | 1.92 | Promotion to EFL League One |
| 2 | Crewe Alexandra (P) | 37 | 20 | 9 | 8 | 67 | 43 | +24 | 69 | 1.86 | Promotion to EFL League One |
| 3 | Plymouth Argyle (P) | 37 | 20 | 8 | 9 | 61 | 39 | +22 | 68 | 1.84 | Promotion to EFL League One |
| 4 | Cheltenham Town | 36 | 17 | 13 | 6 | 52 | 27 | +25 | 64 | 1.78 | Qualification for League Two play-offs (Note: Four teams play for one spot and promotion to EFL League One.) |
| 5 | Exeter City | 37 | 18 | 11 | 8 | 53 | 43 | +10 | 65 | 1.76 | Qualification for League Two play-offs |
| 6 | Colchester United | 37 | 15 | 13 | 9 | 52 | 37 | +15 | 58 | 1.57 | Qualification for League Two play-offs |
| 7 | Northampton Town (O, P) | 37 | 17 | 7 | 13 | 54 | 40 | +14 | 58 | 1.57 | Qualification for League Two play-offs |
| 8 | Port Vale | 37 | 14 | 15 | 8 | 50 | 44 | +6 | 57 | 1.54 | |

Source: EFL Official Website
Rules for classification: 1) Points per game; 2) Goal difference; 3) Number of goals scored; 4) Head-to-head results; 5) Wins; 6) Away goals; 7) Penalty points (sec 9.5); 8) 12-point sending off offences
(C) Champions; (O) Play-off winners; (P) Promoted

==== Results summary ====
| Overall | | | | | | | | Home | | | | | | Away | | | | | |
| Pld | W | D | L | GF | GA | GD | Pts | W | D | L | GF | GA | GD | W | D | L | GF | GA | GD |
|---|---|---|---|---|---|---|---|---|---|---|---|---|---|---|---|---|---|---|---|
| 37 | 20 | 9 | 8 | 67 | 43 | +24 | 69 | 13 | 3 | 3 | 38 | 17 | +21 | 7 | 6 | 5 | 29 | 26 | +3 |

Last updated: 7 March 2020.
Source: BBC

==== Results by matchday ====
| Matchday | 1 | 2 | 3 | 4 | 5 | 6 | 7 | 8 | 9 | 10 | 11 | 12 | 13 | 14 | 15 | 16 | 17 | 18 | 19 | 20 | 21 | 22 | 23 | 24 | 25 | 26 | 27 | 28 | 29 | 30 | 31 | 32 | 33 | 34 | 35 | 36 | 37 |
|---|---|---|---|---|---|---|---|---|---|---|---|---|---|---|---|---|---|---|---|---|---|---|---|---|---|---|---|---|---|---|---|---|---|---|---|---|---|
| Ground | H | A | H | A | A | H | A | H | A | H | A | H | A | H | H | A | A | H | A | H | A | A | H | H | A | H | A | A | H | A | H | H | A | H | A | A | H |
| Result | L | W | W | W | L | W | W | L | W | W | D | D | W | W | D | L | L | W | D | D | W | L | W | W | L | W | D | D | W | W | W | W | L | W | D | D | W |
| Position | 24 | 12 | 6 | 1 | 6 | 3 | 3 | 5 | 2 | 2 | 2 | 4 | 1 | 1 | 1 | 4 | 4 | 3 | 3 | 4 | 3 | 3 | 3 | 3 | 4 | 3 | 3 | 4 | 3 | 2 | 2 | 2 | 3 | 2 | 2 | 2 | 1 |

Updated to match(es) played on 7 March 2020. Source: Statto.com
A = Away; H = Home; W = Win; D = Draw; L = Loss

==== Matches ====
On Thursday, 20 June 2019, the EFL League Two fixtures were revealed.

| 3 August 2019 1 | Crewe Alexandra | 0–3 | Plymouth Argyle | Crewe |
| 15:00 BST | Nolan (yellow card) 20'; Kirk (yellow card) 77'; Ng (yellow card) 90+6' | Report | McFadzean 4', 90+2'; Grant 26'; Edwards (yellow card) 36'; Wharton (yellow card) 57'; Sawyer (yellow card) 74'; Palmer (yellow card) 75'; Mayor (yellow card) 90+6' | Stadium: Gresty Road; Attendance: 5,273; Referee: Matt Donohue |

| 10 August 2019 2 | Oldham Athletic | 1–2 | Crewe Alexandra | Oldham |
| 15:00 BST | Missilou 2'; Haymer (yellow card) 37'; Wilson (yellow card) 63' | Report | Porter 22', 41' (pen.); Dale (yellow card) 90+2' | Stadium: Boundary Park; Attendance: 3,884; Referee: Carl Boyeson |

| 17 August 2019 3 | Crewe Alexandra | 1–0 | Walsall | Crewe |
| 15:00 BST | Nolan 61'; Lancashire (yellow card) 73' (yellow-red card) 90'; Ng (yellow card) 78' | Report | Pring (yellow card) 90+2'; Scarr (yellow card) 90+4' | Stadium: Gresty Road; Attendance: 4,629; Referee: Alan Young |

| 20 August 2019 4 | Crawley Town | 1–2 | Crewe Alexandra | Crawley |
| 19:45 BST | Lubala 16' (yellow card) 51' | Report | Wintle 30'; Green 55' | Stadium: The People's Pension Stadium; Attendance: 2,006; Referee: Tom Nield |

| 24 August 2019 5 | Newport County | 1–0 | Crewe Alexandra | Newport |
| 15:00 BST | Amond 90+3' | Report | Lancashire (yellow card) 9' | Stadium: Rodney Parade; Attendance: 3,712; Referee: Leigh Doughty |

| 31 August 2019 6 | Crewe Alexandra | 2–1 | Bradford City | Crewe |
| 15:00 BST | Pickering (yellow card) 7'; Kirk 42'; Lowery 60' (yellow card) 74'; Ng (yellow card) 77'; Dale (yellow card) 90+4' | Report | Vaughan 32' | Stadium: Alexandra Stadium; Referee: Darren Handley |

| 7 September 2019 7 | Grimsby Town | 0–2 | Crewe Alexandra | Cleethorpes |
| 15:00 BST | Hanson (yellow card) 49' | Report | Lowery 46'; Powell (yellow card) 62'; Kirk 90+1' (yellow card) 90+2' | Stadium: Blundell Park; Attendance: 4,679; Referee: Anthony Coggins |

| 14 September 2019 8 | Crewe Alexandra | 2–3 | Cambridge United | Crewe |
| 15:00 BST | Green (red card) 41'; Nolan 63'; Anene 67' | Report | Smith 12', 72' (pen.); Knoyle (yellow card) 49'; Darling (yellow card) 58'; Lewis 69'; Hannant (yellow card) 83' | Stadium: Alexandra Stadium; Attendance: 3,568; Referee: David Rock |

| 17 September 2019 9 | Leyton Orient | 1–2 | Crewe Alexandra | Leyton |
| 19:45 BST | Maguire-Drew 42' (penalty missed) 57'; Dennis (yellow card) 66'; Marsh (yellow card) 90+3' | Report | Nolan 32'; Jones 90' | Stadium: The Breyer Group Stadium; Attendance: 4,289; Referee: Joshua Smith |

| 21 September 2019 10 | Crewe Alexandra | 4–1 | Salford City | Crewe |
| 15:00 BST | Porter 50'; Lowery 57', 82'; Pickering 62' | Report | Hughes (yellow card) 34'; Rooney 39' | Stadium: Alexandra Stadium; Attendance: 4,714; Referee: Will Finnie |

| 28 September 2019 11 | Cheltenham Town | 1–1 | Crewe Alexandra | Cheltenham |
| 15:00 BST | Reilly 9'; Doyle-Hayes (yellow card) 40'; Hussey (yellow card) 54'; Varney (yellow card) 66' | Report | Hunt (yellow card) 17'; Powell (yellow card) 44'; Porter 45+1'; Ng (yellow card) 49' (yellow-red card) 70'; Jones (yellow card) 58' | Stadium: Jonny-Rocks Stadium; Attendance: 3,549; Referee: Lee Swabey |

| 5 October 2019 12 | Crewe Alexandra | 1–1 | Exeter City | Crewe |
| 15:00 BST | Dale (yellow card) 43'; Hunt (yellow card) 70'; Anene 76'; Kirk (yellow card) 79' | Report | Moxey 2'; Sparkes (yellow card) 62' | Stadium: Alexandra Stadium; Attendance: 5,131; Referee: Ben Toner |

| 12 October 2019 13 | Carlisle United | 2–4 | Crewe Alexandra | Carlisle |
| 15:00 BST | Hope 59'; Elliott 64' | Report | Hunt 7'; Powell 27'; Porter 78'; Jones 85' (o.g.); Nolan (yellow card) 86' | Stadium: Brunton Park; Attendance: 4,521; Referee: Darren England |

| 19 October 2019 14 | Crewe Alexandra | 3–1 | Swindon Town | Crewe |
| 15:00 BST | Porter 59', 90'; Kirk 90+4' | Report | Doyle 37' (yellow card) 83'; Woolery (yellow card) 76'; Rose (yellow card) 78'; Lyden (yellow card) 80' | Stadium: Alexandra Stadium; Attendance: 4,792; Referee: Marc Edwards |

| 22 October 2019 15 | Crewe Alexandra | 0–0 | Colchester United | Crewe |
| 19:45 BST | Lowery (yellow card) 71'; Pickering (yellow card) 80'; Hunt (yellow card) 90+5' | Report | Comley (yellow card) 45'; Eastman (yellow card) 83'; Robinson (red card) 90+5'; Nouble (penalty missed) 90+7' | Stadium: Alexandra Stadium; Attendance: 3,659; Referee: Andy Haines |

| 26 October 2019 | Forest Green Rovers | v | Crewe Alexandra | Nailsworth |
| 15:00 BST | | Report | | Stadium: The New Lawn |
Note: Fixture was postponed due to a waterlogged pitch.

| 2 November 2019 16 | Crewe Alexandra | 0–1 | Port Vale | Crewe |
| 15:00 GMT | | Report | Taylor 61'; Legge (yellow card) 80'; Brown (yellow card) 90+3' | Stadium: Alexandra Stadium; Attendance: 7,705; Referee: Ross Joyce |

| 16 November 2019 17 | Northampton Town | 4–1 | Crewe Alexandra | Northampton |
| 15:00 GMT | Wharton 10', 18'; Hoskins 24' (pen.); Williams 56'; Pollock (yellow card) 90+8' | Report | Porter 37'; Mbulu (yellow card) 81' | Stadium: PTS Academy Stadium; Attendance: 5,236; Referee: Craig Hicks |

| 23 November 2019 18 | Crewe Alexandra | 5–0 | Morecambe | Crewe |
| 15:00 GMT | Finney 22', 90+1'; Lowery 31'; Kirk 38'; Wintle 58' | Report | Lavelle (red card) 34' | Stadium: Alexandra Stadium; Attendance: 4,149; Referee: Martin Coy |

| 26 November 2019 19 | Forest Green Rovers | 0–0 | Crewe Alexandra | Nailsworth |
| 19:45 GMT | Kitching (yellow card) 44'; Rawson (yellow card) 49'; Mills (yellow card) 66' | Report | | Stadium: The New Lawn; Attendance: 2,192; Referee: Charles Breakspear |

| 7 December 2019 | Macclesfield Town | v | Crewe Alexandra | Macclesfield |
| 15:00 GMT | | Report | | Stadium: Moss Rose |
Note: The fixture was suspended by the English Football League on 6 December.

| 14 December 2019 20 | Crewe Alexandra | 1–1 | Mansfield Town | Crewe |
| 15:00 GMT | Anene 8' | Report | Cook 27'; MacDonald (yellow card) 83'; Preston (yellow card) 84' | Stadium: Alexandra Stadium; Attendance: 4,060; Referee: Kevin Johnson |

| 21 December 2019 21 | Stevenage | 1–5 | Crewe Alexandra | Stevenage |
| 15:00 GMT | Cuthbert (yellow card) 28' (goal) 84'; Sonupe (yellow card) 90+1' | Report | Anene 29', 65'; Finney 32'; Powell 57'; Cuthbert 70' (o.g.) | Stadium: The Lamex Stadium; Attendance: 2,993; Referee: Charles Breakspear |

| 26 December 2019 22 | Salford City | 3–1 | Crewe Alexandra | Salford |
| 15:00 GMT | Towell 7'; Thomas-Asante 12'; Jones (yellow card) 14'; Neal (yellow card) 40'; Touray (yellow card) 44'; Wintle 85' (o.g.) | Report | Powell (yellow card) 45+1'; Pickering 82' | Stadium: The Peninsula Stadium; Attendance: 3,031; Referee: Peter Wright |

| 29 December 2019 23 | Crewe Alexandra | 3–1 | Scunthorpe United | Crewe |
| 15:00 GMT | Powell 20', 83'; Green 40'; Hunt (yellow card) 51' | Report | Perch (yellow card) 45'; McArdle (yellow card) 53'; Lund (yellow card) 66'; Novak 81' | Stadium: Alexandra Stadium; Attendance: 4,578; Referee: Marc Edwards |

| 1 January 2020 24 | Crewe Alexandra | 4–1 | Carlisle United | Crewe |
| 15:00 GMT | Ainley 17'; Powell 26', 31'; Anene 34'; Dale (yellow card) 72' | Report | Sagaf (yellow card) 24'; Loft (yellow card) 30'; Iredale 56' | Stadium: Alexandra Stadium; Attendance: 4,316; Referee: John Busby |

| 11 January 2020 25 | Swindon Town | 3–1 | Crewe Alexandra | Swindon |
| 15:00 GMT | Hunt 32'; Yates 69'; Rose 72'; Caddis (yellow card) 80'; Woolery (yellow card) 90+5' | Report | Anene 61' | Stadium: County Ground; Attendance: 7,601; Referee: Darren Handley |

| 18 January 2020 26 | Crewe Alexandra | 1–0 | Cheltenham Town | Crewe |
| 15:00 GMT | Ng 69' | Report | Long (yellow card) 78'; Greaves (yellow card) 84'; May (yellow card) 90+3' | Stadium: Alexandra Stadium; Attendance: 4,478; Referee: Scott Oldham |

| 21 January 2020 27 | Macclesfield Town | 1–1 | Crewe Alexandra | Macclesfield |
| 19:45 GMT | Green 44' (o.g.); Gnahoua (yellow card) 65'; O'Keeffe (yellow card) 87' | Report | Ainley 90+5'; Hunt (yellow card) 90+6' | Stadium: Moss Rose; Attendance: 2,435; Referee: Christopher Pollard |

| 25 January 2020 28 | Scunthorpe United | 2–2 | Crewe Alexandra | Scunthorpe |
| 15:00 GMT | Bedeau 15'; Lund (yellow card) 61' van Veen 73' | Report | Powell 46'; Finney 69' | Stadium: Sands Venue Stadium; Attendance: 3,139; Referee: Christopher Sarginson |

| 28 January 2020 29 | Crewe Alexandra | 2–0 | Leyton Orient | Crewe |
| 19:45 GMT | Kirk 2'; Pickering (yellow card) 81'; Powell 88' | Report | Marsh (yellow card) 59' | Stadium: Alexandra Stadium; Attendance: 3,249; Referee: Leigh Doughty |

| 1 February 2020 30 | Walsall | 1–2 | Crewe Alexandra | Bescot |
| 15:00 GMT | Lavery 15' (yellow card) 88'; Kinsella (yellow card) 64'; Facey (yellow card) 79' | Report | Powell 50'; Finney 68' | Stadium: Banks's Stadium; Attendance: 4,610; Referee: Lee Swabey |

| 8 February 2020 31 | Crewe Alexandra | 2–1 | Oldham Athletic | Crewe |
| 15:00 GMT | Jones 55'; Kirk 90+6' (yellow card) 90+7' | Report | Smith 48' (yellow card) 54'; Nepomuceno (yellow card) 86' | Stadium: Alexandra Stadium; Attendance: 5,271; Referee: Sam Purkiss |

| 11 February 2020 32 | Crewe Alexandra | 2–1 | Crawley Town | Crewe |
| 19:45 GMT | Porter 72' (pen.), 90'; Offord (yellow card) 83'; Ainley (yellow card) 90+1' | Report | Francomb (yellow card) 51'; Bulman (yellow card) 67'; Grego-Cox (yellow card) 68'; Ferguson 84' (pen.) | Stadium: Alexandra Stadium; Attendance: 3,314; Referee: Antony Coggins |

| 15 February 2020 33 | Plymouth Argyle | 2–1 | Crewe Alexandra | Plymouth |
| 15:00 GMT | Jephcott 57'; Sarcevic 71' (pen.) | Report | Pickering 52'; Offord (yellow card) 66' | Stadium: Home Park; Attendance: 11,567; Referee: Tom Nield |

| 22 February 2020 34 | Crewe Alexandra | 2–0 | Macclesfield Town | Crewe |
| 15:00 GMT | Porter 11' (pen.); Walker 35'; Wintle (yellow card) 44' | Report | Kelleher (yellow card) 53' | Stadium: Alexandra Stadium; Attendance: 5,413; Referee: Ross Joyce |

| 29 February 2020 35 | Morecambe | 1–1 | Crewe Alexandra | Morecambe |
| 15:00 GMT | Wildig (yellow card) 55' (goal) 68'; Phillips (red card) 90+4' | Report | Ng 47' | Stadium: Globe Arena; Attendance: 2,872; Referee: Graham Salisbury |

| 3 March 2020 36 | Exeter City | 1–1 | Crewe Alexandra | Exeter |
| 19:45 GMT | Martin (yellow card) 24'; Parkes 32' | Report | Nottingham 61'; Kirk (yellow card) 81' | Stadium: St James Park; Attendance: 4,221; Referee: Lee Swabey |

| 7 March 2020 37 | Crewe Alexandra | 3–1 | Stevenage | Crewe |
| 15:00 GMT | Porter 15'; Kirk 63'; Wintle 67' | Report | Lakin (yellow card) 57'; Mackail-Smith (yellow card) 75'; Carter 90' | Stadium: Alexandra Stadium; Attendance: 4,263; Referee: Andy Haines |

| 14 March 2020 | Mansfield Town | v | Crewe Alexandra | Mansfield |
| 15:00 GMT | | | | Stadium: One Call Stadium |
Note: Season was suspended until 3 April 2020, due to the COVID-19 pandemic.

| 17 March 2020 | Colchester United | v | Crewe Alexandra | Colchester |
| 19:45 GMT | | | | Stadium: JobServe Community Stadium |
Note: Season was suspended until 3 April 2020, due to the COVID-19 pandemic.

| 21 March 2020 | Crewe Alexandra | v | Forest Green Rovers | Crewe |
| 15:00 GMT | | | | Stadium: Alexandra Stadium |
Note: Season was suspended until 3 April 2020, due to the COVID-19 pandemic.

| 28 March 2020 | Port Vale | v | Crewe Alexandra | Burslem |
| 15:00 GMT | | | | Stadium: Vale Park |
Note: Season was suspended until 3 April 2020, due to the COVID-19 pandemic.

| 4 April 2020 | Crewe Alexandra | v | Northampton Town | Crewe |
| 15:00 BST | | | | Stadium: Alexandra Stadium |
Note: On 3 April, the English Football League decided to postpone all football until safe to do so due to the COVID-19 pandemic.

| 10 April 2020 | Crewe Alexandra | v | Newport County | Crewe |
| 15:00 BST | | | | Stadium: Alexandra Stadium |
Note: On 3 April, the English Football League decided to postpone all football until safe to do so due to the COVID-19 pandemic.

| 13 April 2020 | Bradford City | v | Crewe Alexandra | Bradford |
| 13:00 BST | | | | Stadium: The Utilita Energy Stadium |
Note: On 3 April, the English Football League decided to postpone all football until safe to do so due to the COVID-19 pandemic.

| 18 April 2020 | Crewe Alexandra | v | Grimsby Town | Crewe |
| 15:00 BST | | | | Stadium: Alexandra Stadium |
Note: On 3 April, the English Football League decided to postpone all football until safe to do so due to the COVID-19 pandemic.

| 25 April 2020 | Cambridge United | v | Crewe Alexandra | Cambridge |
| 15:00 BST | | | | Stadium: Abbey Stadium |
Note: On 3 April, the English Football League decided to postpone all football until safe to do so due to the COVID-19 pandemic.

=== FA Cup ===
The first round draw was made on 21 October 2019. The second round draw was made live on 11 November from Chichester City's stadium, Oaklands Park. The third round draw was made live on BBC Two from Etihad Stadium, Micah Richards and Tony Adams conducted the draw.

| 9 November 2019 First round | Accrington Stanley | 0–2 | Crewe Alexandra | Accrington |
| 15:00 GMT | Opoku (yellow card) 38'; Hughes (red card) 77'; Carvalho (yellow card) 86' | Report | Kirk 45+2'; Porter 67' (pen.); Jääskeläinen (yellow card) 69'; Lowery (yellow card) 83' | Stadium: Wham Stadium; Attendance: 1,655; Referee: Neil Hair |

| 30 November 2019 Second round | Eastleigh | 1–1 | Crewe Alexandra | Eastleigh |
| 17:30 GMT | Barnett (yellow card) 55'; Hollands (yellow card) 73'; Barnes 86' | Report | Dale 36'; Ng (yellow card) 75' | Stadium: Silverlake Stadium; Attendance: 1,806; Referee: John Busby |

| 10 December 2019 Second round replay | Crewe Alexandra | 3–1 | Eastleigh | Crewe |
| 19:45 GMT | Anene 39', 63'; Johnson 55' (o.g.); Kirk (yellow card) 90+3' | Report | Payne (yellow card) 47'; Barnes 90' | Stadium: Alexandra Stadium; Attendance: 2,184; Referee: Sam Purkiss |

| 4 January 2020 Third round | Crewe Alexandra | 1–3 | Barnsley | Crewe |
| 15:00 GMT | Green 48' | Report | Brown 3'; Chaplin 75'; Thomas 90+4' | Stadium: Alexandra Stadium; Attendance: 5,158; Referee: James Linington |

=== EFL Cup ===
The first round draw was made on 20 June. The second round draw was made on 13 August 2019 following the conclusion of all but one first-round matches.

| 13 August 2019 First round | Middlesbrough | 2–2 (2–4 p) | Crewe Alexandra | Middlesbrough |
| 19:45 BST | Saville (yellow card) 60'; Fletcher 75'; Bola 90+1' | Report | Porter 42'; Kirk 45+1'; Ng (yellow card) 69' | Stadium: Riverside Stadium; Referee: Michael Salisbury |
| | Penalties |
| | Assombalonga (penalty missed); Fletcher (penalty scored); McNair (penalty scored); Browne (penalty missed) | | Porter (penalty scored); Green (penalty scored); Pickering (penalty scored); Jones (penalty scored) |

| 27 August 2019 Second round | Crewe Alexandra | 1–6 | Aston Villa | Crewe |
| 19:45 BST | Lancashire (yellow card) 71'; Wintle 84' | Report | Konsa 4'; Hourihane 24', 45+3'; Lansbury (yellow card) 58'; Davis 69'; Guilbert 76'; Grealish 87' | Stadium: Gresty Road; Attendance: 7,173; Referee: Jarred Gillett |

=== EFL Trophy ===
On 9 July 2019, the pre-determined group stage draw was announced with Invited clubs to be drawn on 12 July 2019.

| Pos | Div | Team | Pld | W | PW | PL | L | GF | GA | GD | Pts | Qualification |
|---|---|---|---|---|---|---|---|---|---|---|---|---|
| 1 | ACA | Everton U21 | 3 | 1 | 1 | 1 | 0 | 5 | 3 | +2 | 6 | Advance to Round 2 |
| 2 | L2 | Mansfield Town | 3 | 1 | 0 | 2 | 0 | 4 | 3 | +1 | 5 | Advance to Round 2 |
| 3 | L2 | Crewe Alexandra | 3 | 0 | 2 | 0 | 1 | 4 | 6 | −2 | 4 | |
| 4 | L1 | Burton Albion | 3 | 1 | 0 | 0 | 2 | 4 | 5 | −1 | 3 | |

Source: EFL.com

| 3 September 2019 Group stage | Crewe Alexandra | 1–3 | Burton Albion | Crewe |
| 19:30 BST | Kirk (yellow card) 81'; Green 87' | Report | Quinn 13'; Fraser 23'; Akins 45+1'; Brayford (yellow card) 82'; Wallace (yellow card) 89' | Stadium: Alexandra Stadium; Attendance: 917; Referee: Anthony Backhouse |

| 8 October 2019 Group stage | Mansfield Town | 1–1 (3–4 p) | Crewe Alexandra | Mansfield |
| 19:45 BST | Knowles 18'; Cook (yellow card) 27' | Report | Johnson (yellow card) 30'; Finney 45' (yellow card) 87' | Stadium: One Call Stadium; Attendance: 800; Referee: James Oldham |
| | Penalties |
| | Hamilton (penalty scored); Cook (penalty missed); Afolayan (penalty scored); Smith (penalty missed); Benning (penalty scored) | | Ng (penalty missed); Jones (penalty scored); Pickering (penalty scored); Finney (penalty scored); Kirk (penalty scored) |

| 5 November 2019 Group stage | Crewe Alexandra | 2–2 (7–6 p) | Everton U21 | Crewe |
| 19:30 GMT | Ainley 43'; Mbulu (yellow card) 50'; Dale 78' | Report | Niasse 3', 75'; Baningime (yellow card) 45'; Denny (yellow card) 77' | Stadium: Alexandra Stadium; Attendance: 851; Referee: Christopher Sarginson |
| | Penalties |
| | Jones (penalty scored); Ainley (penalty scored); Pickering (penalty scored); Finney (penalty scored); Ng (penalty scored) | | Foulds (penalty scored); Anderson (penalty scored); Astley (penalty missed); Niasse (penalty scored); Markelo (penalty scored) |

== Transfers ==
=== Transfers in ===
| Date | Position | Nationality | Name | From | Fee | Ref. |
|---|---|---|---|---|---|---|
| 1 July 2019 | CB | (England) | Olly Lancashire | (England) Swindon Town | Free transfer | |
| 1 July 2019 | RW | (England) | Daniel Powell | (England) Northampton Town | Free transfer | |
| 30 October 2019 | CB | (England) | Christian Mbulu | (Scotland) Motherwell | Free transfer | |
| 12 March 2020 | GK | (South Africa) | Dino Visser | (England) Exeter City | Free transfer | |

=== Loans in ===
| Date from | Position | Nationality | Name | From | Date until | Ref. |
|---|---|---|---|---|---|---|
| 20 August 2019 | CF | (Norway) | Chuma Anene | (Denmark) FC Midtjylland | 30 June 2020 | |
| 16 January 2020 | RB | (Saint Kitts and Nevis) | Michael Nottingham | (England) Blackpool | 30 June 2020 | |
| 31 January 2020 | CF | (England) | Stephen Walker | (England) Middlesbrough | 30 June 2020 | |

=== Loans out ===
| Date from | Position | Nationality | Name | To | Date until | Ref. |
|---|---|---|---|---|---|---|
| 24 July 2019 | CF | (England) | Shaun Miller | (England) Morecambe | 30 June 2020 | |
| 23 August 2019 | CF | (England) | Lewis Reilly | (England) AFC Telford United | September 2019 | |
| 19 September 2019 | CB | (Wales) | Billy Sass-Davies | (England) AFC Telford United | 2 December 2019 | |
| 4 October 2019 | CM | (England) | Connor Heath | (England) Witton Albion | November 2019 | |
| 24 October 2019 | CF | (England) | Lewis Reilly | (England) Curzon Ashton | December 2019 | |
| 15 November 2019 | CM | (England) | Josh Lundstram | (England) Kidsgrove Athletic | December 2019 | |
| 13 December 2019 | RB | (England) | Luke Offord | (England) Nantwich Town | 21 January 2020 | |
| 3 January 2020 | FW | (England) | Aaron Lomas | (England) Nantwich Town | Dual Registration | |
| 17 January 2020 | CM | (England) | Josh Lundstram | (England) Altrincham | 24 March 2020 | |
| 22 January 2020 | CM | (England) | Connor Heath | (England) Colwyn Bay | 26 April 2020 | |
| 4 February 2020 | CB | (Wales) | Billy Sass-Davies | (England) Ashton United | March 2020 | |
| 14 February 2020 | LM | (England) | Regan Griffiths | (England) Kidsgrove Athletic | 17 March 2020 | |
| 13 March 2020 | RB | (England) | Travis Johnson | (England) Witton Albion | 25 April 2020 | |

=== Transfers out ===
| Date | Position | Nationality | Name | To | Fee | Ref. |
|---|---|---|---|---|---|---|
| 1 July 2019 | CF | (England) | Jordan Bowery | (England) Milton Keynes Dons | Free transfer | |
| 1 July 2019 | GK | (England) | Ben Garratt | (England) Burton Albion | Released | |
| 1 July 2019 | AM | (England) | Joe Lynch | (England) Morecambe | Released | |
| 1 July 2019 | RW | (England) | Alex Nicholls | (England) Solihull Moors | Released | |
| 1 July 2019 | CB | (Wales) | George Ray | (England) Tranmere Rovers | Rejected contract | |
| 1 July 2019 | CB | (England) | Michael Raynes | (England) Hartlepool United | Released | |
| 24 January 2020 | CB | (England) | Christian Mbulu | (England) Morecambe | Mutual consent | |

== Player statistics ==
=== Appearances and goals ===
| No. | Pos | Nat | Player | Total | | League Two | | FA Cup | | EFL Cup | | EFL Trophy | |
| No. | Pos | Nat | Player | Apps | Goals | Apps | Goals | Apps | Goals | Apps | Goals | Apps | Goals |
|---|---|---|---|---|---|---|---|---|---|---|---|---|---|
| 1 | GK | (Finland) FIN | Will Jääskeläinen | 39 | 0 | 35 | 0 | 4 | 0 | 0 | 0 | 0 | 0 |
| 2 | DF | (England) ENG | Perry Ng | 45 | 2 | 36 | 2 | 4 | 0 | 2 | 0 | 3 | 0 |
| 3 | DF | (England) ENG | Harry Pickering | 43 | 3 | 35 | 3 | 4 | 0 | 1 | 0 | 1+2 | 0 |
| 4 | MF | (England) ENG | Ryan Wintle | 46 | 4 | 37 | 3 | 4 | 0 | 2 | 1 | 2+1 | 0 |
| 5 | DF | (England) ENG | Olly Lancashire | 11 | 0 | 7+2 | 0 | 0 | 0 | 2 | 0 | 0 | 0 |
| 6 | DF | (Ireland) EIR | Eddie Nolan | 26 | 3 | 19 | 3 | 2 | 0 | 2 | 0 | 3 | 0 |
| 7 | MF | (England) ENG | Daniel Powell | 33 | 9 | 24+6 | 9 | 1+2 | 0 | 0 | 0 | 0 | 0 |
| 8 | MF | (Scotland) SCO | James Jones | 29 | 2 | 13+10 | 2 | 0+1 | 0 | 0+2 | 0 | 2+1 | 0 |
| 9 | FW | (England) ENG | Chris Porter | 31 | 14 | 25+1 | 12 | 3 | 1 | 2 | 1 | 0 | 0 |
| 10 | MF | (England) ENG | Charlie Kirk | 44 | 9 | 35+1 | 7 | 4 | 1 | 2 | 1 | 1+1 | 0 |
| 11 | MF | (England) ENG | Callum Ainley | 31 | 3 | 6+19 | 2 | 1 | 0 | 2 | 0 | 3 | 1 |
| 12 | MF | (Ireland) EIR | Paul Green | 33 | 4 | 22+4 | 2 | 3+1 | 1 | 0+1 | 0 | 1+1 | 1 |
| 13 | GK | (Wales) WAL | Dave Richards | 7 | 0 | 2 | 0 | 0 | 0 | 2 | 0 | 3 | 0 |
| 14 | MF | (England) ENG | Oliver Finney | 24 | 6 | 11+7 | 5 | 1+1 | 0 | 0+1 | 0 | 2+1 | 1 |
| 15 | DF | (England) ENG | Nicky Hunt | 29 | 1 | 22+3 | 1 | 3 | 0 | 0 | 0 | 1 | 0 |
| 16 | MF | (England) ENG | Tom Lowery | 36 | 5 | 28+1 | 5 | 4 | 0 | 2 | 0 | 1 | 0 |
| 17 | FW | (Norway) NOR | Chuma Anene | 34 | 9 | 12+16 | 7 | 1+1 | 2 | 0+1 | 0 | 3 | 0 |
| 18 | MF | (England) ENG | Regan Griffiths | 0 | 0 | 0 | 0 | 0 | 0 | 0 | 0 | 0 | 0 |
| 19 | FW | (England) ENG | Owen Dale | 36 | 2 | 7+20 | 0 | 3+1 | 1 | 2 | 0 | 3 | 1 |
| 20 | MF | (England) ENG | Josh Lundstram | 0 | 0 | 0 | 0 | 0 | 0 | 0 | 0 | 0 | 0 |
| 21 | MF | (England) ENG | Luke Offord | 9 | 0 | 9 | 0 | 0 | 0 | 0 | 0 | 0 | 0 |
| 22 | DF | (Wales) WAL | Billy Sass-Davies | 1 | 0 | 0 | 0 | 0 | 0 | 0+1 | 0 | 0 | 0 |
| 23 | DF | (England) ENG | Travis Johnson | 3 | 0 | 0+1 | 0 | 0 | 0 | 0 | 0 | 1+1 | 0 |
| 24 | FW | (England) ENG | Lewis Reilly | 0 | 0 | 0 | 0 | 0 | 0 | 0 | 0 | 0 | 0 |
| 25 | DF | (England) ENG | Rio Adebisi | 5 | 0 | 1+1 | 0 | 0 | 0 | 1 | 0 | 2 | 0 |
| 26 | MF | (England) ENG | Connor Heath | 0 | 0 | 0 | 0 | 0 | 0 | 0 | 0 | 0 | 0 |
| 27 | GK | (England) ENG | Sam Booth | 0 | 0 | 0 | 0 | 0 | 0 | 0 | 0 | 0 | 0 |
| 28 | DF | (Saint Kitts and Nevis) SKN | Michael Nottingham | 12 | 1 | 12 | 1 | 0 | 0 | 0 | 0 | 0 | 0 |
| 29 | FW | (England) ENG | Stephen Walker | 6 | 1 | 6 | 1 | 0 | 0 | 0 | 0 | 0 | 0 |
| 30 | DF | (England) ENG | Christian Mbulu | 7 | 0 | 3+1 | 0 | 2 | 0 | 0 | 0 | 1 | 0 |
| 31 | GK | (South Africa) RSA | Dino Visser | 0 | 0 | 0 | 0 | 0 | 0 | 0 | 0 | 0 | 0 |
