= 2017–18 Crewe Alexandra F.C. season =

Crewe Alexandra
2017–18 season
- Chairman: John Bowler
- Manager: David Artell
- Stadium: Gresty Road
- League Two: 15th
- FA Cup: Second round
- EFL Cup: First round (vs. Bolton Wanderers)
- EFL Trophy: Group stage
- Top goalscorer: League: Jordan Bowery (12); All: Jordan Bowery (13)

The 2017–18 season was Crewe Alexandra's 141st season in their history, their 94th in the English Football League and second consecutive in League Two. Along with competing in League Two, the club participated in the FA Cup, EFL Cup and EFL Trophy.

The season covers the period from 1 July 2017 to 30 June 2018

== Competitions ==
=== Friendlies ===
As of 5 June 2017, Crewe Alexandra have announced seven pre-season friendlies against Stoke City, Macclesfield Town, Buxton, Barrow, Alsager Town, Bury, Kidsgrove Athletic.

11 July 2017	Buxton	1–3	Crewe Alexandra	Buxton
19:45 BST	?	Report	Reilly (x2); Walker	Stadium: The Silverlands

11 July 2017	Kidsgrove Athletic	2–7	Crewe Alexandra	Kidsgrove
19:45 BST	Cropper 2'	Report	Kirk (x3); Porter (x2) [[George Cooper (footballer, born 1996)|Cooper]] Lowery	Stadium: The Novus Stadium

18 July 2017	Barrow	0–0	Crewe Alexandra	Barrow-in-Furness
19:45 BST		Report		Stadium: Holker Street

19 July 2017	Alsager Town	1–1	Crewe Alexandra	Alsager
19:30 BST	Ryan 62'	Report	Dale 53'	Stadium: Wood Park Stadium

22 July 2017	Bury	1–1	Crewe Alexandra	Bury
15:00 BST	Beckford 85'	Report	Walker 10'	Stadium: Gigg Lane

25 July 2017	Macclesfield Town	3–0	Crewe Alexandra	Macclesfield
19:30 BST	Whittaker 65' (pen.); Trialist 74'; Lloyd 90+3'	Report		Stadium: Moss Rose

30 July 2017	Crewe Alexandra	3–1	Stoke City XI	Crewe
15:00 BST	Cooper 25'; Porter 39'; Nolan 43'	Report	Waddington 86'	Stadium: Gresty Road; Attendance: 2,528

=== League Two ===
==== League table ====
Pos	Team	Pld	W	D	L	GF	GA	GD	Pts
13	Colchester United	46	16	14	16	53	52	+1	62
14	Crawley Town	46	16	11	19	58	66	−8	59
15	Crewe Alexandra	46	17	5	24	62	75	−13	56
16	Stevenage	46	14	13	19	60	65	−5	55
17	Cheltenham Town	46	13	12	21	67	73	−6	51

Source: BBC Sport
Rules for classification: 1) Points; 2) Goal difference; 3) Number of goals scored

==== Result summary ====
Overall								Home						Away					
Pld	W	D	L	GF	GA	GD	Pts	W	D	L	GF	GA	GD	W	D	L	GF	GA	GD
46	17	5	24	62	75	−13	56	10	4	9	32	32	0	7	1	15	30	43	−13

Last updated: 8 May 2018.

==== Results by matchday ====
Matchday	1	2	3	4	5	6	7	8	9	10	11	12	13	14	15	16	17	18	19	20	21	22	23	24	25	26	27	28	29	30	31	32	33	34	35	36	37	38	39	40	41	42	43	44	45	46
Ground	H	H	H	A	A	H	H	A	H	A	A	H	A	H	H	A	H	A	A	H	A	H	H	A	A	H	A	H	A	A	H	A	H	H	A	A	H	H	A	A	H	A	A	H	A	H
Result	D	D	W	W	L	W	L	L	L	L	L	W	L	W	L	L	L	L	W	L	L	W	L	W	L	W	L	L	L	L	D	L	W	L	W	D	L	W	W	L	D	W	L	W	W	W
Position	12	18	10	4	8	4	10	15	16	18	19	17	19	17	17	18	20	22	19	19	22	20	20	20	20	20	20	21	21	21	21	22	20	21	18	18	20	19	17	17	18	17	17	17	16	15

Updated to match(es) played on 8 May 2018. Source: Statto.com
A = Away; H = Home; W = Win; D = Draw; L = Loss

==== Matches ====
On 21 June 2017, the league fixtures were announced.

5 August 2017 1	Crewe Alexandra	2–2	Mansfield Town	Crewe
15:00 BST	Nolan (yellow card) 25'; Porter 45', 63'; Walker (yellow card) 62'; Raynes (yellow card) 66'; Ainley (yellow card) 75'	Report	Mellis (yellow card) 34'; Rose (yellow card) 45+3' (goal) 55'; Mirfin 66'; Byrom (yellow card) 70'; White (yellow card) 76'; Sterling-James (yellow card) 79'	Stadium: Gresty Road; Attendance: 4,933; Referee: Graham Salisbury

12 August 2017 2	Crewe Alexandra	1–1	Newport County	Crewe
15:00 BST	Ng (yellow card) 9' (yellow-red card) 17'; Dagnall 18'	Report	Nouble 13'; Demetriou (yellow card) 83'; O'Brien (yellow card) 88'	Stadium: Gresty Road; Attendance: 3,400; Referee: Eddie Ilderton

19 August 2017 3	Crewe Alexandra	1–0	Barnet	Crewe
15:00 BST	Pickering (yellow card) 57'; Porter 75'	Report	Taylor (yellow card) 77'; Tutonda (yellow card) 87'	Stadium: Gresty Road; Attendance: 3,217; Referee: Anthony Backhouse

26 August 2017 4	Port Vale	0–1	Crewe Alexandra	Burslem
15:00 BST	Harness (yellow card) 9'; Tonge (red card) 34'	Report	Dagnall 30'; Nolan (yellow card) 76'; Bakayogo (yellow card) 90+4'	Stadium: Vale Park; Attendance: 6,299; Referee: Darren Handley

2 September 2017 5	Grimsby Town	1–0	Crewe Alexandra	Cleethorpes
15:00 BST	Rose 36' (yellow card) 58'; Dembélé (yellow card) 48'	Report	Cooper (yellow card) 11'; Raynes (yellow card) 33'	Stadium: Blundell Park; Attendance: 4,066; Referee: Chris Sarginson

9 September 2017 6	Crewe Alexandra	5–1	Chesterfield	Crewe
15:00 BST	Porter 6', 47'; Ng 54'; Cooper 66'; Ainley 81'	Report	Nolan 72' (o.g.); Reed (yellow card) 90'	Stadium: Gresty Road; Attendance: 3,513; Referee: Martin Coy

12 September 2017 7	Crewe Alexandra	0–1	Cambridge United	Crewe
19:45 BST		Report	Ibehre 35'	Stadium: Gresty Road; Attendance: 3,042; Referee: Graham Salisbury

16 September 2017 8	Exeter City	3–0	Crewe Alexandra	Exeter
15:00 BST	Tillson 7'; Taylor 38'; Stockley 76'	Report	Nolan (yellow card) 35'; Walker (yellow card) 52'; Dale (yellow card) 79'	Stadium: St James Park; Attendance: 4,218; Referee: Antony Coggins

23 September 2017 9	Crewe Alexandra	0–5	Carlisle United	Crewe
15:00 BST	Raynes (yellow card) 48'	Report	Grainger 13', 48' (pen.); Raynes 72' (o.g.); Lambe 75'; Hope 90+4'	Stadium: Gresty Road; Attendance: 4,021; Referee: Ross Joyce

26 September 2017 10	Wycombe Wanderers	3–2	Crewe Alexandra	High Wycombe
19:45 BST	Mackail-Smith 29' (yellow card) 65'; Harriman 88'; Tyson 90'; Jacobson (yellow card) 90+2'	Report	Dagnall 42', 66'; Bakayogo (yellow card) 45+1'; Ng (yellow card) 55'; Raynes (yellow card) 89'	Stadium: Adams Park; Attendance: 3,295; Referee: Andy Haines

30 September 2017 11	Coventry City	1–0	Crewe Alexandra	Coventry
15:00 BST	Nazon 9'; Jones (yellow card) 87'	Report	Lowery (yellow card) 46'	Stadium: Ricoh Arena; Attendance: 7,664; Referee: Dean Whitestone

7 October 2017 12	Crewe Alexandra	1–0	Stevenage	Crewe
15:00 BST	Nolan (yellow card) 36'; Bowery 90+4'	Report	Conlon (yellow card) 34'; Franks (yellow card) 42'; Wilkinson (yellow card) 44'	Stadium: Gresty Road; Attendance: 3,679; Referee: Trevor Kettle

14 October 2017 13	Yeovil Town	2–0	Crewe Alexandra	Yeovil
15:00 BST	Browne 15'; Olomola 56'; Zoko (yellow card) 89'	Report		Stadium: Huish Park; Attendance: 2,360; Referee: Ben Toner

17 October 2017 14	Crewe Alexandra	2–0	Notts County	Crewe
19:45 BST	Lowery (yellow card) 31'; Raynes 44'; Bowery 66'; Ng (yellow card) 68'; Porter (yellow card) 88'	Report	Yates (yellow card) 64'; Ameobi (yellow card) 70'; Dickinson (yellow card) 82'	Stadium: Gresty Road; Attendance: 3,339; Referee: Robert Jones

21 October 2017 15	Crewe Alexandra	0–2	Accrington Stanley	Crewe
15:00 BST	Raynes (yellow card) 2' (yellow-red card) 83'; Lowery (yellow card) 86'	Report	Kee 3' (pen.); Clark 11'; Conneely (yellow card) 77'	Stadium: Alexandra Stadium; Attendance: 3,849; Referee: Anthony Backhouse

28 October 2017 16	Colchester United	3–1	Crewe Alexandra	Colchester
15:00 BST	Mandron 39', 71'; Reid (yellow card) 54'; Eastman 60'; Loft (yellow card) 76'	Report	Bowery 22'	Stadium: Colchester Community Stadium; Attendance: 3,088; Referee: Kevin Johnson

11 November 2017 17	Crewe Alexandra	1–4	Lincoln City	Crewe
15:00 GMT	Raynes 8'	Report	Anderson 50', 67'; Raynes 70' (o.g.); Bostwick (yellow card) 90'; Whitehouse 90+4'	Stadium: Gresty Road; Attendance: 4,723; Referee: Craig Hicks

18 November 2017 18	Forest Green Rovers	3–2	Crewe Alexandra	Nailsworth
15:00 GMT	Doidge 44', 83'; Traoré (yellow card) 66'; Bugiel (yellow card) 90+1'; Iacovitti 90+2'	Report	Porter 14'; Bowery 54'; Dagnall (yellow card) 67'; Grant (yellow card) 87'	Stadium: The New Lawn; Attendance: 2,221; Referee: Chris Sarginson

21 November 2017 19	Morecambe	0–1	Crewe Alexandra	Morecambe
19:45 GMT		Report	Ng (yellow card) 61' (goal) 85'	Stadium: Globe Arena; Attendance: 927; Referee: Scott Oldham

25 November 2017 20	Crewe Alexandra	1–2	Luton Town	Crewe
15:00 GMT	Ng (yellow card) 48'; Mullins 81' (o.g.); Dagnall (yellow card) 84'	Report	Hylton 63' (yellow card) 87'; Berry 67'	Stadium: Gresty Road; Attendance: 4,571; Referee: Graham Salisbury

9 December 2017 21	Cheltenham Town	1–0	Crewe Alexandra	Cheltenham
15:00 GMT	Grimes 52'	Report	Ng (yellow card) 43'; Walker (yellow card) 60'	Stadium: Whaddon Road; Attendance: 2,795; Referee: Dean Whitestone

16 December 2017 22	Crewe Alexandra	3–0	Crawley Town	Crewe
15:00	Ainley 40'; Dagnall 45' 90+4'; Raynes (yellow card) 49'; Pickering (yellow card) 75'	Report	Yorwerth (yellow card) 23'; Morris (yellow card) 34'; Evina (yellow card) 56'; Roberts (yellow card) 59' (yellow-red card); Smith (red card) 61'; Boldewijn (yellow card) 88'	Stadium: Gresty Road; Attendance: 3,155; Referee: (England) Ben Toner

23 December 2017 23	Crewe Alexandra	0–3	Swindon Town	Crewe
15:00	Pickering (yellow card) 54'	Report	Woolery 8' (yellow card) 84'; Linganzi 17'; Norris 20' (pen.) (yellow card) 63'; Taylor (yellow card) 68'; Purkiss (yellow card) 71'	Stadium: Gresty Road; Attendance: 3,736; Referee: (England) Eddie Ilderton

26 December 2017 24	Chesterfield	0–2	Crewe Alexandra	Chesterfield
15:00		Report	Porter 7'; Kirk 26'; Cooper (yellow card) 90+4'	Stadium: Proact Stadium; Attendance: 5,904; Referee: (England) Tom Nield

30 December 2017 25	Cambridge United	3–1	Crewe Alexandra	Cambridge
15:00	Maris 1'; Amoo 27'; Ikpeazu 70'; Ibehre (red card) 90+2'	Report	Dagnall 30'; Stubbs (yellow card) 57'	Stadium: Cambs Glass Stadium; Attendance: 4,165; Referee: (England) Craig Hicks

1 January 2018 26	Crewe Alexandra	2–0	Grimsby Town	Crewe
15:00	Porter 12'; Ng (yellow card) 12'; Walker 34'	Report	Woolford (yellow card) 34'; Berrett (yellow card) 34'	Stadium: Gresty Road; Attendance: 3,292; Referee: (England) Seb Stockbridge

13 January 2018 27	Carlisle United	1–0	Crewe Alexandra	Carlisle
15:00	Cosgrove 76'; Bennett (yellow card) 80'	Report	Walker (yellow card) 74'; Raynes (yellow card) 75'	Stadium: Brunton Park; Attendance: 4,467; Referee: (England) Chris Sarginson

20 January 2018 28	Crewe Alexandra	2–3	Wycombe Wanderers	Crewe
15:00	Porter 6' (pen.); Nolan (yellow card) 55'; McKirdy 88' (yellow card) 90'	Report	Cowan-Hall 61'; Tyson 84'; Mackail-Smith 90+2'	Stadium: Gresty Road; Attendance: 3,645; Referee: (England) Martin Coy

27 January 2018 29	Swindon Town	4–3	Crewe Alexandra	Swindon
15:00	Richards 3' 89' (yellow card) 90'; Elšnik 66' 79'; Preston (yellow card) 87'; Anderson (yellow card) 90+8'		Ainley 15' 29'; McKirdy (yellow card) 24'; Wintle 51'; Kirk (yellow card) 58'; Bakayogo (yellow card) 61' (yellow-red card); Richards (yellow card) 67'; Garratt (yellow card) 84'	Stadium: Energy Check County Ground; Attendance: 5,439; Referee: (England) Graham Salisbury

3 February 2017 30	Notts County	4–1	Crewe Alexandra	Nottingham
15:00	Noor Husin 15' (yellow card) 65'; Hewitt 41' 60'; Bennett 89'	Report	Miller 8'; Nolan (yellow card) 43'	Stadium: Meadow Lane; Attendance: 17,274; Referee: (England) Brett Huxtable

10 February 2018 31	Crewe Alexandra	0–0	Yeovil Town	Crewe
15:00 GMT		Report	Whelan (yellow card) 21'; Dickson (yellow card) 90'	Stadium: Gresty Road; Attendance: 3,498; Referee: Robert Lewis

13 February 2018 32	Accrington Stanley	1–0	Crewe Alexandra	Accrington
19:45 GMT	Jackson 42'; Donacien (yellow card) 73'	Report		Stadium: Wham Stadium; Attendance: 1,254; Referee: David Webb

17 February 2018 33	Crewe Alexandra	1–0	Colchester United	Crewe
15:00 GMT	Miller 60'	Report		Stadium: Gresty Road; Attendance: 3,548; Referee: Michael Salisbury

20 February 2018 34	Crewe Alexandra	1–2	Exeter City	Crewe
19:45 GMT	Miller (yellow card) 67', (goal) 88'; Raynes (yellow card) 78'	Report	Stockley (yellow card) 78', (goal) 90+5'; Pym (yellow card) 89'; Moore-Taylor 90+2'	Stadium: Gresty Road; Attendance: 3,081; Referee: Ben Toner

24 February 2018 35	Lincoln City	1–4	Crewe Alexandra	Lincoln
15:00 GMT	Bostwick 36'	Report	Pickering 45'; Bowery 48', 68'; Green 54' (pen.)	Stadium: Sincil Bank; Attendance: 8,272; Referee: Carl Boyeson

10 March 2018 36	Stevenage	2–2	Crewe Alexandra	Stevenage
15:00 GMT	Bowditch 14', 50'	Report	Ng 80'; Kirk 90+7'	Stadium: Broadhall Way; Attendance: 2,032; Referee: Graham Horwood

17 March 2018 37	Crewe Alexandra	1–2	Coventry City	Crewe
15:00 GMT	Bowery 33'	Report	Clarke-Harris 5'; Bayliss 43'	Stadium: Gresty Road; Attendance: 4,666; Referee: Antony Coggins

20 March 2018 38	Crewe Alexandra	3–1	Forest Green Rovers	Crewe
19:45 GMT	Bowery 44', 61'; Kirk 59'	Report	Grubb 64'	Stadium: Gresty Road; Attendance: 3,158; Referee: Anthony Backhouse

24 March 2018 39	Newport County	1–2	Crewe Alexandra	Newport
15:00 GMT	Demetriou 81'	Report	McKirdy 26'; Bowery 60'	Stadium: Rodney Parade; Attendance: 4,638; Referee: Darren Handley

30 March 2018 40	Barnet	2–1	Crewe Alexandra	Edgware, London
15:00 BST	Akinde 51' (pen.) 87' (pen.)	Report	McKirdy 70'	Stadium: The Hive; Attendance: 1,951; Referee: Lee Swabey

2 April 2018 41	Crewe Alexandra	2–2	Port Vale	Crewe
15:00 BST	Wintle 7'; Kirk 90+3'	Report	Pope 36' (pen.); Kay 71'	Stadium: Gresty Road; Attendance: 6,680; Referee: Andy Woolmer

7 April 2018 42	Mansfield Town	3–4	Crewe Alexandra	Mansfield
15:00 BST	Angol 15'; Hemmings 50'; Miller 76'	Report	Jones 7'; Bowery 10'; Pickering 25'; Kirk 27'	Stadium: One Call Stadium; Attendance: 3,480; Referee: Richard Clark

14 April 2018 43	Luton Town	3–1	Crewe Alexandra	Luton
15:00 BST	McCormack (yellow card) 31'; Hylton 39', (yellow card) 69'; Lee 45+2'; Mpanzu 51'	Report	Bowery 35'; Green (yellow card) 41'; Nolan (yellow card) 88'	Stadium: Kenilworth Road; Attendance: 9,202; Referee: Ben Toner

21 April 2018 44	Crewe Alexandra	1–0	Morecambe	Crewe
15:00 BST	Miller 88'	Report		Stadium: Gresty Road; Attendance: 3,942; Referee: Charles Breakspear

28 April 2018 45	Crawley Town	1–2	Crewe Alexandra	Crawley
15:00 BST	Smith 9'; Yorwerth (yellow card) 90+5'	Report	Ng 5'; Pickering 51'	Stadium: Broadfield Stadium; Attendance: 2,089; Referee: Tom Neild

5 May 2018 46	Crewe Alexandra	2–1	Cheltenham Town	Crewe
15:00 BST	Ray (yellow card) 6'; Miller 17', 62'	Report	Lloyd 34'; Morrell (yellow card) 68'	Stadium: Gresty Road; Attendance: 4,350; Referee: Michael Salisbury

=== FA Cup ===
On 16 October 2017, Crewe Alexandra were drawn at home to Rotherham United in the first round. In the second round Alex were given an away tie against Blackburn Rovers.

4 November 2017 First round	Crewe Alexandra	2–1	Rotherham United	Crewe
15:00 GMT	Walker 47' (yellow card) 72'; Ainley 89'	Report	Vaulks 21'; Williams (yellow card) 59'; Cummings (yellow card) 63'; Moore (yellow card) 90+3'	Stadium: Gresty Road; Attendance: 2,597; Referee: Scott Oldham

3 December 2017 Second round	Blackburn Rovers	3–3	Crewe Alexandra	Blackburn
14:00 GMT	Samuel 11', 20'; Graham 15'; Harper (red card) 33'; Bennett (red card) 56'	Report	Walker (yellow card) 27'; Porter 35' (pen.), 66'; Nolan 63'; Ng (yellow card) 90'	Stadium: Ewood Park; Attendance: 4,472; Referee: David Webb

13 December 2017 (Note: On 12 December, both clubs agreed to reschedule the second round replay fixture 24 hours later due to adverse weather conditions.) Second round replay	Crewe Alexandra	0–1	Blackburn Rovers	Crewe
19:45 GMT		Report	Graham 24'; Harper (yellow card) 29'; Ward (yellow card) 89'	Stadium: Gresty Road; Attendance: 2,241; Referee: Anthony Backhouse

=== EFL Cup ===
On 16 June 2017, Crewe Alexandra were drawn at home to Bolton Wanderers in the first round.

9 August 2017 First round	Crewe Alexandra	1–2	Bolton Wanderers	Crewe
19:45 BST	Porter 42'; Walker (yellow card) 52'	Report	Pratley (yellow card) 57'; Armstrong 70'; Derik 81'	Stadium: Gresty Road; Referee: Mark Heywood

=== EFL Trophy ===
On 12 July 2017, Crewe Alexandra were drawn against Newcastle United U23s, Oldham Athletic and Port Vale in Northern Group D.

Pos	Lge	Team	Pld	W	PW	PL	L	GF	GA	GD	Pts	Qualification
1	L2	Port Vale (Q)	3	2	1	0	0	5	2	+3	8	Round 2
2	L1	Oldham Athletic (Q)	3	2	0	1	0	5	1	+4	7	Round 2
3	ACA	Newcastle United U21 (E)	3	1	0	0	2	3	6	−3	3	
4	L2	Crewe Alexandra (E)	3	0	0	0	3	3	7	−4	0	

Updated to match(es) played on 7 November 2017. Source: EFL.com
(E) Eliminated; (Q) Qualified to the phase indicated

29 August 2017 Group Game 1	Crewe Alexandra	1–2	Newcastle United U23s	Crewe
19:30 BST	Bowery 88'	report	Smith 4'; Charman 68'	Stadium: Gresty Road; Attendance: 1,351

3 October 2017 Group Game 2	Crewe Alexandra	0–1	Oldham Athletic	Crewe
19:30 BST	Porter (yellow card) 34'; Stubbs (yellow card) 69'	Report	Byrne (yellow card) 38' (goal) 42'	Stadium: Gresty Road; Attendance: 976; Referee: Seb Stockbridge

7 November 2017 Group Game 3	Port Vale	4–2	Crewe Alexandra	Burslem
19:45 GMT	Regis 3'; Forrester 8'; Reeves 65'; Montaño 90'	Report	Reilly 31', 70'	Stadium: Vale Park; Attendance: 1,322; Referee: John Brooks

== Transfers ==
=== Transfers in ===
Date from	Position	Nationality	Name	From	Fee	Ref.
1 July 2017	CF	(England)	Jordan Bowery	Leyton Orient	Free	
1 July 2017	CF	(England)	Chris Porter	Colchester United	Free	
1 July 2017	CB	(England)	Michael Raynes	Carlisle United	Free	
3 July 2017	LB	(Republic of Ireland)	Eddie Nolan	Blackpool	Free	
4 July 2017	CM	(England)	Brad Walker	Hartlepool United	Undisclosed	
15 August 2017	GK	(Finland)	Will Jääskeläinen	Leek Town	Free	

=== Transfers out ===
Date from	Position	Nationality	Name	To	Fee	Ref.
1 July 2017	CM	(England)	Billy Bingham	Gillingham	Released	(Note: Billy Bingham joined Gillingham following his release.)
1 July 2017	CB	(England)	Harry Davis	St Mirren	Released	(Note: Harry Davis joined St Mirren following his release.)
1 July 2017	GK	(England)	Andrew Dawber	Free agent	Released	
1 July 2017	CB	(England)	Jon Guthrie	Walsall	Free	
1 July 2017	CM	(England)	Danny Hollands	Eastleigh	Rejected contract	(Note: Danny Hollands joined Eastleigh after rejecting a new contract.)
1 July 2017	CB	(England)	Ben Nugent	Gillingham	Released	(Note: Ben Nugent joined Gillingham following his release.)
1 July 2017	DF	(England)	Marcus Poscha	Ramsbottom United	Released	(Note: Marcus Poscha joined Ramsbottom United following his release.)
1 July 2017	CF	(Wales)	Callum Saunders	Notts County	Released	(Note: Callum Saunders joined Notts County following his release.)
1 July 2017	RB	(England)	Ollie Turton	Blackpool	Rejected contract	(Note: Ollie Turton joined Blackpool after rejecting a new contract.)
18 January 2018	CM	(England)	George Cooper	Peterborough United	Undisclosed fee	

=== Loans in ===
Start date	Position	Nationality	Name	From	End date	Ref.
29 August 2017	CB	(England)	Sam Stubbs	Wigan Athletic	10 January 2018	
30 August 2017	MF	(England)	Conor Grant	Everton	10 January 2018	
11 January 2018	MF	(Republic of Ireland)	Paul Green	Oldham Athletic	May 2018	
19 January 2018	MF	(England) / (Turkey)	Daniel Barlaser	Newcastle United	9 April 2018	
19 January 2018	FW	(England)	Harry McKirdy	Aston Villa	May 2018	
25 January 2018	FW	(England)	Shaun Miller	Carlisle United	May 2018	
31 January 2018	RB	(England)	Jamie Sterry	Newcastle United	May 2018	

=== Loans out ===
Start date	Position	Nationality	Name	To	End date	Ref.
1 September 2017	CM	(England)	Oliver Finney	Halesowen Town	31 October 2017	
1 September 2017	CF	(Nigeria)	Daniel Udoh	Halesowen Town	30 November 2017	(Note: On 4 November, Daniel Udoh's loan at Halesowen Town was extended.)
14 September 2017	GK	(Finland)	William Jääskeläinen	Loughborough Dynamo	10 October 2017	
10 October 2017	GK	(Finland)	William Jääskeläinen	Nantwich Town	11 December 2017	(Note: On 13 November, William Jääskeläinen's loan at Nantwich Town was extended.)
1 November 2017	CF	(England)	Owen Dale	Witton Albion	30 November 2017	
7 December 2017	CF	(Nigeria)	Daniel Udoh	Chester	8 January 2018	
4 January 2018	GK	(Finland)	William Jääskeläinen	Buxton	4 February 2018	
11 January 2018	CF	(Nigeria)	Daniel Udoh	Leamington	11 February 2018	
1 March 2018	GK	(Finland)	William Jääskeläinen	Chester	1 April 2018	
