= Tom Lowery =

Welsh footballer

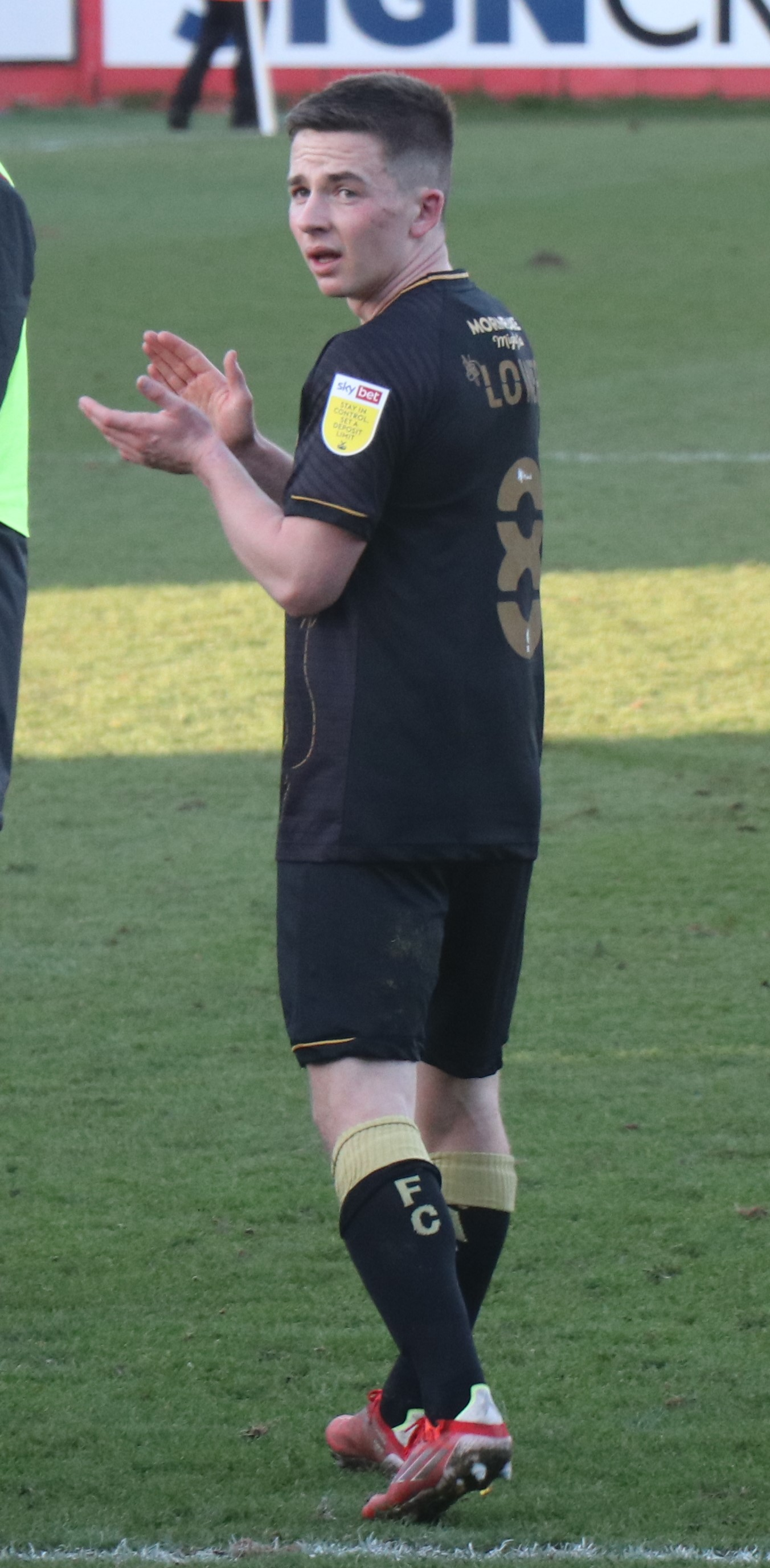
- Lowery with Crewe Alexandra in February 2022

Personal information
- Full name: Thomas Richard Lowery
- Date of birth: 31 December 1997 (age 28)
- Place of birth: Holmes Chapel, England
- Height: 5 ft 6 in (1.68 m)
- Position: Midfielder

Team information
- Current team: Kilmarnock
- Number: 18

Youth career
- 2014–2016: Crewe Alexandra

Senior career*
| Years | Team | Apps | (Gls) |
| 2016–2022 | Crewe Alexandra | 151 | (13) |
| 2022–2025 | Portsmouth | 26 | (0) |
| 2025 | → Crewe Alexandra (loan) | 17 | (2) |
| 2025– | Kilmarnock | 21 | (1) |
- * Club domestic league appearances and goals as of 20 May 2026

Thomas Richard Lowery (born 31 December 1997) is a Welsh professional footballer who plays as a midfielder for Scottish Premiership side Kilmarnock.

== Club career ==
=== Crewe Alexandra ===
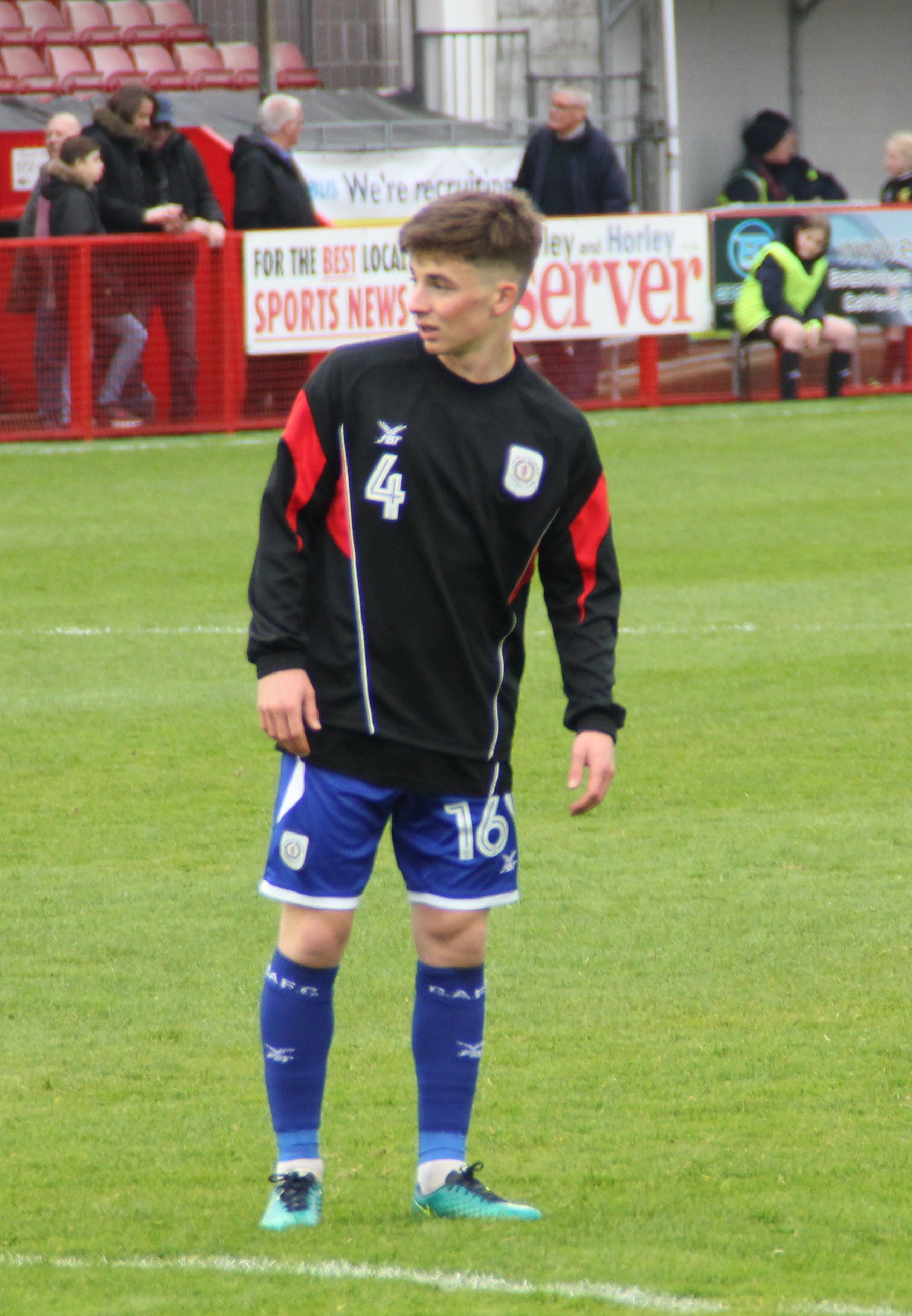
Tom Lowery at Crawley Town (2018)

A graduate of the Crewe Alexandra Academy, Lowery signed his first professional contract with the club in May 2016. He made his Crewe debut on 4 October 2016, coming on as a second-half substitute in an EFL Trophy tie against Wolverhampton Wanderers U23s at Gresty Road.

The diminutive midfielder made what was regarded as a "sparkling" league debut four days later, coming on at half-time against Luton Town at Kenilworth Road on 8 October 2016. Nicknamed 'Miniesta', Lowery was described as "hungry for the ball and composed and inventive with it at his feet". A week later, he was in Crewe's starting line-up at Notts County.

In January 2018, Lowery signed a new three-and-a-half-year contract at Crewe. He scored his first goal for Crewe in a 2–0 defeat of Yeovil Town at Gresty Road on 19 April 2019, in his 50th League appearance.

In January 2020, after 36 Crewe appearances during the season, Lowery suffered a pelvic injury which ruled him out of several games. In October 2020, Lowery signed a new two-year contract.

He played no part in Crewe's July 2021 pre-season games after negotiations over a new contract stalled. As the contract impasse continued into August, Lowery only played an under-23s game on 16 August 2021 due to a shortage of players caused by a sickness bug; he did not otherwise feature for Crewe during the first weeks of the season. He eventually made his season debut on 31 August in a 1–0 victory at Shrewsbury Town in an EFL Trophy group tie, as manager David Artell looked to conclude further talks with Lowery and his agent, but the talks stalled again in early September. He eventually resumed league appearances, coming on as a second-half substitute and scoring Crewe's goal in a 2–1 defeat at Wycombe Wanderers on 23 October 2021. He scored three further goals as Crewe were relegated from League One; manager Alex Morris, who had replaced Artell, did not expect Lowery to extend his Crewe career beyond the end of the season.

=== Portsmouth ===
On 5 August 2022, Lowery joined League One Portsmouth on a three-year contract, making his Pompey debut as a second-half substitute in a 3–0 EFL League Cup first round win at Cardiff City on 9 August 2022. During his 10th appearance, on 17 September 2022 against Plymouth Argyle, Lowery suffered a hamstring injury which ruled him out of League action until March 2023. In the opening game of the 2023–2024 season on 5 August 2023, Lowery suffered a torn meniscus in his knee, requiring surgery and a lengthy recovery period, eventually returning to the first team in January 2024.

==== Crewe Alexandra (loan) ====
On 30 January 2025, Lowery returned to Crewe Alexandra on loan for the remainder of the 2024–25 season, making his first appearance in Crewe's 1–1 draw at Harrogate Town on 1 February 2025, and scoring a penalty in a 3–0 victory over Barrow at Gresty Road on 22 February 2024.

He was released by Portsmouth upon the expiration of his contract at the end of the 2024–25 season.

=== Kilmarnock ===
On 7 July 2025, Lowery joined Scottish Premiership side Kilmarnock. He scored his first goal for the club on 12 May 2026, in a 3–1 win over Dundee that secured the club's Premiership survival.

== International career ==
In May 2021, Lowery was called up to train with the Wales national squad ahead of the UEFA Euro 2020 tournament.

== Statistics ==
As of 21 May 2026

| Club | Season | Division | League | | FA Cup | | League Cup | | Other | | Total | |
| Club | Season | Division | Apps | Goals | Apps | Goals | Apps | Goals | Apps | Goals | Apps | Goals |
|---|---|---|---|---|---|---|---|---|---|---|---|---|
| Crewe Alexandra | 2016–17 | League Two | 7 | 0 | 0 | 0 | 0 | 0 | 2 (Note: Appearances in EFL Trophy) | 0 | 9 | 0 |
| Crewe Alexandra | 2017–18 | League Two | 31 | 0 | 3 | 0 | 1 | 0 | 3 | 0 | 38 | 0 |
| Crewe Alexandra | 2018–19 | League Two | 15 | 1 | 0 | 0 | 1 | 0 | 2 | 0 | 18 | 1 |
| Crewe Alexandra | 2019–20 | League Two | 29 | 5 | 4 | 0 | 2 | 0 | 1 | 0 | 36 | 5 |
| Crewe Alexandra | 2020–21 | League One | 37 | 3 | 2 | 0 | 0 | 0 | 1 | 0 | 40 | 3 |
| Crewe Alexandra | 2021–22 | League One | 32 | 4 | 1 | 0 | 0 | 0 | 1 | 0 | 34 | 4 |
| Crewe Alexandra | Total | | 151 | 13 | 10 | 0 | 4 | 0 | 10 | 0 | 175 | 13 |
| Portsmouth | 2022–23 | League One | 17 | 0 | 1 | 0 | 2 | 0 | 1 | 0 | 21 | 0 |
| Portsmouth | 2023–24 | League One | 9 | 0 | 0 | 0 | 0 | 0 | 0 | 0 | 9 | 0 |
| Portsmouth | 2024–25 | Championship | 0 | 0 | 0 | 0 | 1 | 0 | — | | 1 | 0 |
| Portsmouth | Total | | 26 | 0 | 1 | 0 | 3 | 0 | 1 | 0 | 31 | 0 |
| Crewe Alexandra (loan) | 2024–25 | League Two | 17 | 2 | 0 | 0 | 0 | 0 | 0 | 0 | 17 | 2 |
| Kilmarnock | 2025–26 | Scottish Premiership | 21 | 1 | 1 | 0 | 3 | 0 | 0 | 0 | 25 | 1 |
| Career total | | | 215 | 16 | 12 | 0 | 10 | 0 | 11 | 0 | 248 | 16 |

== Honours ==
Portsmouth

- EFL League One: 2023–24
