= Dave Richards (footballer, born 1993) =

Welsh footballer

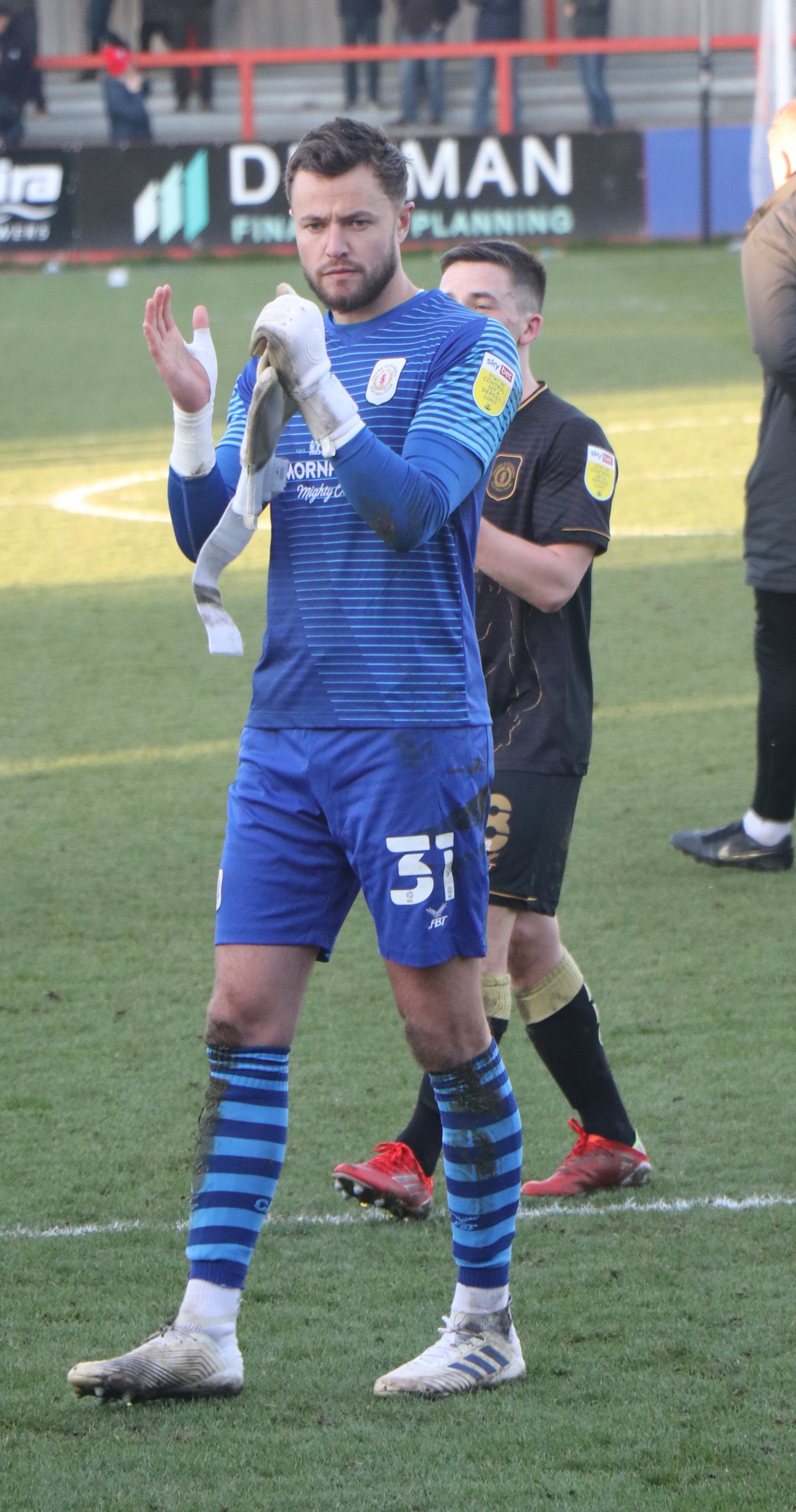
- Richards while at Crewe Alexandra in 2022

Personal information
- Full name: David Matthew Richards
- Date of birth: 31 December 1993 (age 32)
- Place of birth: Abergavenny, Wales
- Height: 1.89 m (6 ft 2 1/2 in)
- Position: Goalkeeper

Team information
- Current team: Kidderminster Harriers
- Number: 30

Youth career
- 2010–2012: Cardiff City

Senior career*
Years	Team	Apps	(Gls)
2012–2014	Cardiff City	0	(0)
2012	→ Llanelli (loan)	5	(0)
2013	→ Chippenham Town (loan)	2	(0)
2013–2014	→ Bristol City (loan)	0	(0)
2014–2015	Bristol City	0	(0)
2015–2024	Crewe Alexandra	73	(0)
2023–2024	→ St Johnstone (loan)	0	(0)
2024–2026	Dundee United	19	(0)
2026–	Kidderminster Harriers	0	(0)
- * Club domestic league appearances and goals as of 20 May 2026

David Matthew Richards (born 31 December 1993) is a Welsh professional footballer who plays as a goalkeeper for National League club Kidderminster Harriers.

== Club career ==
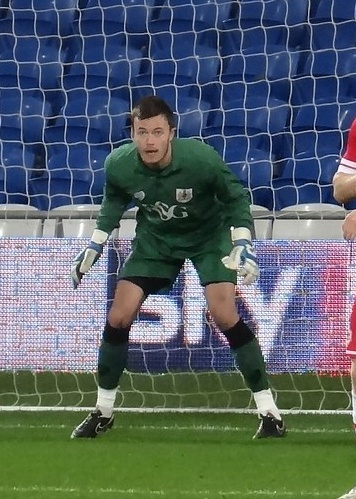
Richards playing for Bristol City's development team in 2014

=== Cardiff City ===
Richards started his career with Cardiff City spending time out on loan to Llanelli in 2012 and with Chippenham Town in 2013. In October 2013, Richards joined Bristol City on a loan deal which was made permanent in January 2014.

=== Bristol City ===
Richards spent the majority of his career at City on the bench. During this time Bristol City won League One and Richards received a winners medal as an unused substitute as City beat Walsall to win the Football League Trophy.

=== Crewe Alexandra ===
In July 2015, after his release from Bristol City, Richards signed for Crewe Alexandra. Richard spent two years acting as understudy for Ben Garratt before making his senior debut in English football in September 2017 as Crewe lost 1–0 at Coventry City.

In April 2017, Richards signed an extended Crewe Alexandra contract until at least 2019, with a year option. That year option was automatically exercised by Crewe at the end of the 2018–19 season. On 13 August 2019, Richards saved a vital penalty at Middlesbrough as Crewe beat the Championship side 4–2 on penalties after a 2–2 draw, earning the Cheshire side an EFL Cup second round home tie against Premier League side Aston Villa. He also saved a penalty in his first league start of the season, at Grimsby Town on 7 September 2019, helping Crewe to a 2–0 win.

Richards was offered a new contract in June 2020, and agreed a two-year deal.

He signed a new deal in May 2022, but missed Crewe's opening games of the following season due to a finger injury and resulting operation, being replaced by Arsenal loanee keeper Arthur Okonkwo as Crewe won their first two games. Okonkwo made 26 appearances and kept ten clean sheets for Crewe before he was recalled by Arsenal in mid-January, with Richards making his first league appearance of the season in a 1–1 draw at Mansfield Town on 14 January 2023. He played in a further eight league games, but was replaced for spells by on-loan Brighton keeper James Beadle and then, for the final four games of the season, by Crewe Academy graduate Tom Booth. Richards was made available for transfer by Crewe at the end of the season.

==== St Johnstone (loan) ====
On 11 August 2023, Richards joined Scottish Premiership club St Johnstone on a season-long loan, but made no first-team appearances.

=== Dundee United ===
On 7 June 2024, Richards joined Scottish Premiership club Dundee United on a two-year deal. He was promoted to first choice for the last two games of the season, as United secured 4th place in dramatic scenes at the new firm derby at Tannadice. He played 17 league games in the 2025-26 season but turned down a new contract at the end of the season.

=== Kidderminster Harriers ===
Richards signed a short-term deal with newly-promoted National League side Kidderminster Harriers on 5 August 2026, as their signing of Jack Wint from Manchester City was delayed.

== Career statistics ==
As of match played 5 August 2026

Appearances and goals by club, season and competition
Club	Season	League			National cup (Note: Includes FA Cup)		League cup (Note: Includes EFL Cup, Scottish League Cup)		Other		Total	
Club	Season	Division	Apps	Goals	Apps	Goals	Apps	Goals	Apps	Goals	Apps	Goals
Cardiff City	2012–13	Championship	0	0	0	0	0	0	0	0	0	0
Cardiff City	2013–14	Premier League	0	0	0	0	0	0	0	0	0	0
Cardiff City	Total		0	0	0	0	0	0	0	0	0	0
Llanelli (loan)	2012	Welsh Premier League	5	0	—		—		—		5	0
Chippenham Town (loan)	2013	Southern League	2	0	—		—		—		2	0
Bristol City (loan)	2013–14	League One	0	0	—		—		—		0	0
Bristol City	2014	League One	0	0	0	0	0	0	0	0	0	0
Bristol City	2014–15	Championship	0	0	0	0	0	0	0	0	0	0
Bristol City	Total		0	0	0	0	0	0	0	0	0	0
Crewe Alexandra	2015–16	League One	0	0	0	0	0	0	0	0	0	0
Crewe Alexandra	2016–17	League Two	0	0	0	0	0	0	0	0	0	0
Crewe Alexandra	2017–18	League Two	11	0	2	0	0	0	1 (Note: Appearances in EFL Trophy)	0	14	0
Crewe Alexandra	2018–19	League Two	4	0	0	0	1	0	0	0	5	0
Crewe Alexandra	2019–20	League Two	2	0	0	0	2	0	3	0	7	0
Crewe Alexandra	2020–21	League One	15	0	0	0	1	0	4	0	20	0
Crewe Alexandra	2021–22	League One	32	0	1	0	0	0	2	0	35	0
Crewe Alexandra	2022–23	League Two	9	0	0	0	0	0	3	0	12	0
Crewe Alexandra	2023–24	League Two	0	0	0	0	0	0	0	0	0	0
Crewe Alexandra	Total		73	0	3	0	4	0	13	0	93	0
St Johnstone (loan)	2023–24	Scottish Premiership	0	0	0	0	0	0	0	0	0	0
Dundee United	2024–25	Scottish Premiership	2	0	0	0	2	0	0	0	4	0
Dundee United	2025-26	Scottish Premiership	17	0	1	0	0	0	0	0	18	0
Kidderminster Harriers	2026-27	National League	0	0	0	0	0	0	0	0	0	0
Career total			99	0	4	0	6	0	13	0	122	0

== Honours ==
Bristol City

- Football League Trophy: 2014–15
