= Oliver Finney =

English footballer (born 1997)

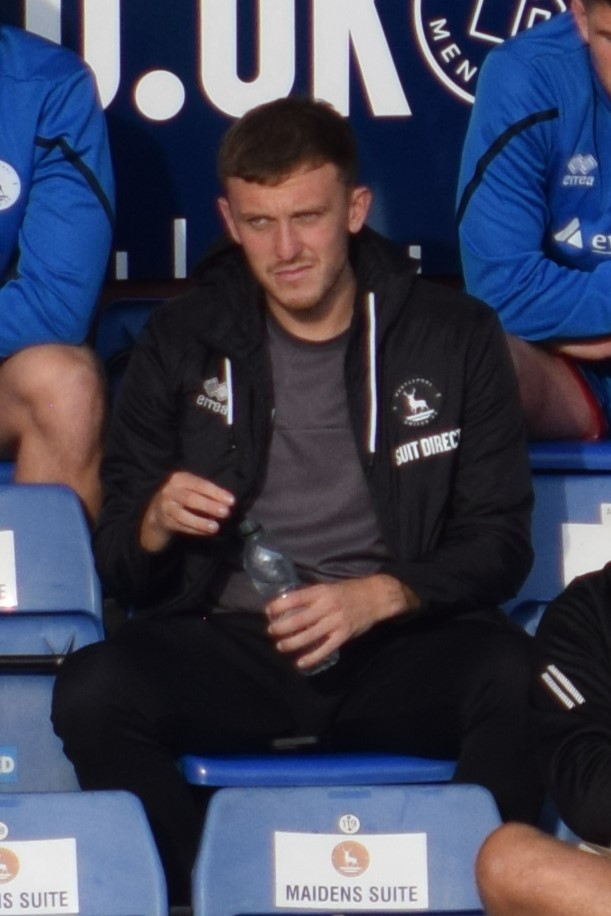
- Finney with Hartlepool United in 2023

Personal information
- Full name: Oliver Vincent Finney
- Date of birth: 15 December 1997 (age 28)
- Place of birth: Newcastle-under-Lyme, England
- Height: 1.70 m (5 ft 7 in)
- Position: Midfielder

Team information
- Current team: Nantwich Town

Youth career
- –2016: Crewe Alexandra

Senior career*
Years	Team	Apps	(Gls)
2016–2023	Crewe Alexandra	99	(14)
2016–2017	→ Nantwich Town (loan)	5	(0)
2017	→ Halesowen Town (loan)	0	(0)
2023	Hartlepool United	20	(2)
2023–2025	Kidsgrove Athletic	17	(4)
2025–	Nantwich Town	7	(0)
- * Club domestic league appearances and goals as of 16:38, 24 May 2026 (UTC)

Oliver Vincent Finney (born 15 December 1997) is an English semi-professional footballer who plays as a midfielder for Nantwich Town.

After seven seasons at his first club, Crewe Alexandra, Finney joined Hartlepool United in January 2023 before leaving in November 2023.

== Career ==
=== Crewe Alexandra ===
Finney signed professional terms with Crewe in early 2016 while still a scholar in the club's academy. In December 2016, he joined Nantwich Town on loan, making five appearances for the Dabbers.

He made his Crewe debut on 6 May 2017, coming on as a 72nd-minute substitute for James Jones against Barnet at Gresty Road, Crewe's final game of the 2016–17 season. On 9 May 2017, Crewe announced that Finney had been offered a new contract by the club, and he signed a new one-year deal on 11 May 2017.

On 1 September 2017, Finney signed for Northern Premier League team Halesowen Town on a two-month loan deal along with teammate Daniel Udoh, returning to Crewe in November after incurring an injury.

Finney signed a further one-year contract with Crewe in May 2018. He made his first start for Crewe in a Football League Trophy tie against Manchester City under-21s on 25 September 2018, and his first start in a league game at Northampton Town on 3 November 2018.

Offered a new contract by Crewe at the end of the 2018–19 season, Finney agreed a new one-year deal with another year option. On 9 October 2019, Finney scored his first Crewe goal, the equaliser in an EFL Trophy tie at Mansfield Town that finished 1–1; he then scored in the penalty shoot-out that Crewe won 4–3. He scored his first two league goals in a 5–0 win over Morecambe at Gresty Road on 23 November 2019.

A contract extension clause was triggered by Crewe in June 2020, and Finney signed a new three-year contract in September 2020. After scoring eight goals in 30 previous appearances during the 2020–21 season, Finney suffered a broken leg due to what Crewe manager David Artell described as "a horrific tackle" by Shrewsbury's Harry Chapman in Crewe's 1–0 win on 2 February 2021. In April 2021, he was rated unlikely to play again in the remainder of the season. In July 2021, Finney agreed another year-long extension to his contract, committing himself to Crewe until 2024.

=== Hartlepool United ===
On 31 January 2023, Finney signed for League Two side Hartlepool United on a permanent deal, making his debut in Pools' 1–0 win at Doncaster Rovers on 4 February 2023. On 1 April 2023, he scored his first Hartlepool goal with a long distance strike in added time to win the match 2–1 against Swindon Town. Finney left Hartlepool on 2 November 2023.

=== Kidsgrove Athletic ===
After leaving Pools, Finney signed for Northern Premier League Division One West side Kidsgrove Athletic. He made his debut in a 2–1 win over Trafford on 25 November 2023. He struggled for playing time during his legal issues and played only once in the 2024–25 season, in a 3–3 draw at Bootle on 26 April 2025, a month after he was acquitted of rape. On 4 June 2025, it was announced Finney had signed a new one-year contract with Kidsgrove.

=== Nantwich Town ===
Finney rejoined Nantwich Town on 7 November 2025, making his second debut in a 1–1 draw at Darlaston Town on 9 November.

== Personal life ==
Finney is the older brother of Crewe Alexandra midfielder Charlie Finney.

=== Legal issues ===
In March 2018, Finney received a 17-month driving ban after he was caught driving whilst almost two times over the drink-drive limit. He was fined £219 and also ordered to pay £165 costs.

In October 2023, Finney was charged with raping a woman in Cheshire in 2022 and was initially suspended by Hartlepool United, before leaving the club early the following month. On 14 December 2023, he pleaded not guilty to the rape charge at Chester Crown Court, and was bailed ahead of a trial originally scheduled for December 2024, later postponed to March 2025, when he was found not guilty at Chester Crown Court.

== Career statistics ==
As of match played 6 December 2025

Club	Season	Division	League		FA Cup		League Cup		Other		Total	
Club	Season	Division	Apps	Goals	Apps	Goals	Apps	Goals	Apps	Goals	Apps	Goals
Crewe Alexandra	2016–17	League Two	1	0	0	0	0	0	0	0	1	0
Crewe Alexandra	2017–18	League Two	1	0	-	-	-	-	-	-	1	0
Crewe Alexandra	2018–19	League Two	17	0	1	0	-	-	1 (Note: Appearances in EFL Trophy)	0	19	0
Crewe Alexandra	2019–20	League Two	18	5	2	0	1	0	3	1	24	6
Crewe Alexandra	2020–21	League One	25	7	2	1	1	0	3	0	31	8
Crewe Alexandra	2021–22	League One	27	2	1	0	1	0	5	2	34	4
Crewe Alexandra	2022–23	League Two	10	0	0	0	1	0	3	0	14	0
Crewe Alexandra	Total		99	14	6	1	4	0	15	3	124	17
Hartlepool United	2022–23	League Two	12	1	0	0	0	0	0	0	12	1
Hartlepool United	2023–24	National League	8	1	0	0	0	0	0	0	8	1
Hartlepool United	Total		20	2	0	0	0	0	0	0	20	2
Kidsgrove Athletic	2023–24	NPL Division One West	5	0	0	0	0	0	1 (Note: Appearance in Staffordshire Senior Cup)	0	6	0
Kidsgrove Athletic	2024–25	NPL Division One West	1	0	0	0	0	0	0	0	1	0
Kidsgrove Athletic	2025–26	NPL Division One West	11	4	3	1	0	0	1	0	15	5
Kidsgrove Athletic	Total		17	4	3	1	0	0	2	0	22	5
Nantwich Town	2025–26	NPL Division One West	7	0	0	0	0	0	0	0	7	0
Career total			143	20	9	2	4	0	17	3	173	24

== Honours ==
Crewe Alexandra

- EFL League Two runner-up: 2019–20
