= Lewis Reilly =

English footballer

Personal information
- Full name: Lewis Colin Reilly
- Date of birth: 7 July 1999 (age 27)
- Place of birth: Liverpool, England
- Height: 1.80 m (5 ft 11 in)
- Position: Forward

Team information
- Current team: Workington

Youth career
- –2017: Crewe Alexandra

Senior career*
Years	Team	Apps	(Gls)
2017–2020	Crewe Alexandra	8	(0)
2018	→ Halesowen Town (loan)	5	(1)
2019	→ Curzon Ashton (loan)	16	(8)
2019	→ Telford United (loan)	2	(1)
2019	→ Curzon Ashton (loan)	0	(0)
2020–2021	Chorley	14	(6)
2021–2022	Marine	25	(7)
2022–	Workington		
- * Club domestic league appearances and goals as of 18:28, 23 April 2022 (UTC)

Lewis Colin Reilly (born 7 July 1999) is an English professional footballer who plays for Northern Premier League side Workington. He was previously at Crewe Alexandra, Chorley and Marine.

== Career ==
=== Crewe Alexandra ===
Reilly signed professional terms with Crewe in July 2017. He made his debut on 29 August 2017, coming on as an 89th-minute substitute for George Cooper in an EFL Trophy group stage game against Newcastle United U21s at Gresty Road. He made his first start in a Crewe shirt on 7 November 2017, again in the EFL Trophy, and scored twice in a 4–2 defeat by Port Vale at Vale Park.

Reilly made his league debut, coming on as a 76th-minute substitute at Morecambe, on 21 November 2017, and made three further substitute appearances before being named in the starting line-up for Crewe's home league game against Wycombe Wanderers on 20 January 2018.

Reilly's release by Crewe was announced on 10 June 2020.

==== Loans ====
On 9 November 2018, Reilly joined Southern Football League Premier Division Central side Halesowen Town on a month's loan, and the following day scored twice on his debut in a 3–2 FA Trophy home win over Prescot Cables. He again scored twice in Halesowen's next FA Trophy tie, against Spennymoor Town, on 24 November, and added a league goal, against Alvechurch, on 4 December 2018.

On 4 January 2019, Reilly joined National League North side Curzon Ashton on a month's loan (later extended), scoring his first goal for the club in a 4–2 win at Nuneaton Borough on 12 January. He was recalled to Crewe on 11 April 2019 having played 16 games and scored 8 goals for Curzon Ashton.

In August 2019, Reilly joined National League North side Telford United on a one-month loan deal.

In October 2019, Reilly rejoined Curzon Ashton on a month's loan, subsequently extended by a further month.

=== Chorley ===
In July 2020, it was reported Reilly had signed a pre-contract agreement to join Chorley on 1 August 2020.

=== Marine ===
In July 2021, he signed for Marine.

=== Workington ===
In the summer of 2022, Reilly moved to Workington.

== Career statistics ==
As of 28 November 2019.

Appearances and goals by club, season and competition
Club	Season	League			FA Cup		League Cup		Other		Total	
Club	Season	Division	Apps	Goals	Apps	Goals	Apps	Goals	Apps	Goals	Apps	Goals
Crewe Alexandra	2017–18	League Two	5	0	2	0	0	0	2	2	9	2
Crewe Alexandra	2018–19	League Two	3	0	0	0	1	0	0	0	4	0
Crewe Alexandra	Crewe Alexandra total		8	0	2	0	1	0	2	2	13	2
Halesowen Town (loan)	2018–19	Southern League	1	1	0	0	0	0	2	4	3	5
Curzon Ashton (loan)	2018–19	National League North	16	8	0	0	0	0	0	0	16	8
Telford United (loan)	2019–20	National League North	2	0	0	0	0	0	0	0	2	0
Curzon Ashton (loan)	2019–20	National League North	0	0	0	0	0	0	0	0	0	0
Chorley	2020–21	National League North	5	1	0	0	0	0	3	2	8	3
Career total			32	10	2	0	1	0	7	8	42	18
