= Eddie Nolan =

Irish footballer (born 1988)

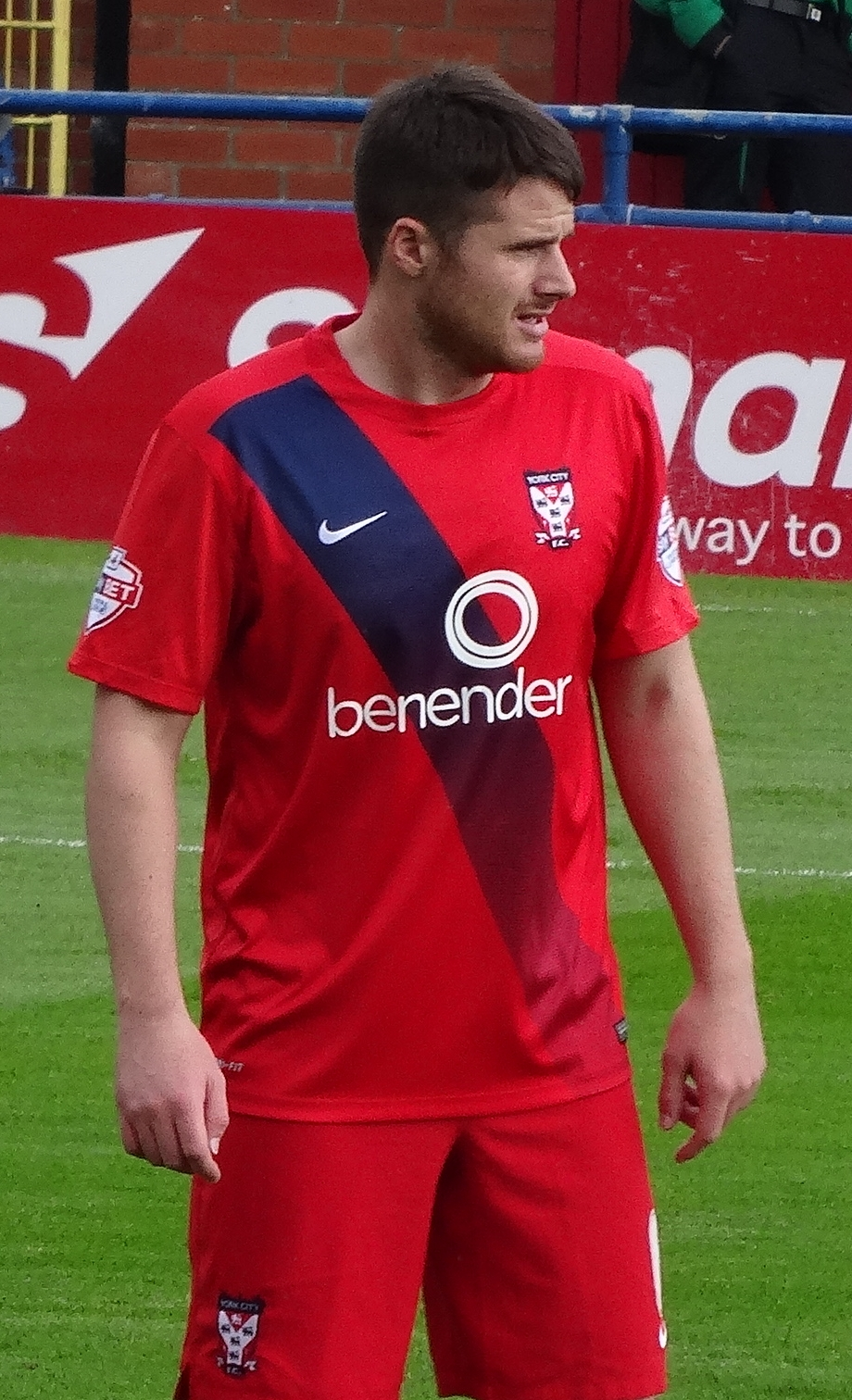
- Nolan playing for York City in 2015

Personal information
- Full name: Edward William Nolan
- Date of birth: 5 August 1988 (age 38)
- Place of birth: Waterford, Ireland
- Height: 1.85 m (6 ft 1 in)
- Positions: Full-back; centre-back

Youth career
- –2006: Blackburn Rovers

Senior career*
Years	Team	Apps	(Gls)
2006–2009	Blackburn Rovers	0	(0)
2007	→ Stockport County (loan)	4	(0)
2007–2008	→ Hartlepool United (loan)	11	(0)
2008–2009	→ Preston North End (loan)	3	(0)
2009–2011	Preston North End	37	(0)
2010	→ Sheffield Wednesday (loan)	14	(1)
2010–2011	→ Scunthorpe United (loan)	22	(0)
2011–2012	Scunthorpe United	43	(1)
2013–2015	Scunthorpe United	57	(0)
2015–2016	York City	15	(1)
2016–2017	Blackpool	3	(0)
2017–2021	Crewe Alexandra	94	(4)
2021	→ Motherwell (loan)	0	(0)
2021–2023	Waterford	47	(2)
Total		350	(9)

International career^{‡}
2006–2008	Republic of Ireland U21	12	(0)
2008	Republic of Ireland B	1	(0)
2009	Republic of Ireland	3	(0)
- * Club domestic league appearances and goals as of 13:02, 16 August 2023 ‡ National team caps and goals as of 20:16, 9 April 2020 (UTC)

Edward William Nolan (born 5 August 1988) is an Irish former professional footballer who played as a full-back or centre-back.

During his career Nolan played for Blackburn Rovers, Stockport County, Hartlepool United, Preston North End, Sheffield Wednesday, Scunthorpe United, York City, Blackpool, Crewe Alexandra, Motherwell and Waterford.

Nolan has played internationally for the Republic of Ireland 12 times at under-21, once at B level and 3 times at senior level, all 3 coming in 2009.

== Club career ==
=== Blackburn Rovers ===
Born in Waterford, County Waterford, Nolan started his career with English club Blackburn Rovers in their youth team. He signed a professional contract on 12 September 2005. He made his first-team debut in the UEFA Cup tie against AS Nancy on 13 December 2006, coming on as a substitute for Andy Todd. Despite being a promising footballer who could get first-team football at Blackburn Rovers in the future, Nolan never made another Blackburn Rovers appearance again.

On 19 March 2007 he signed a one-month loan with Stockport County. Nolan made his Stockport County debut, in a 2–1 loss against Bristol Rovers on 20 March 2007. Nolan went on to make four appearances for Stockport County.

On 22 November 2007, Nolan joined Hartlepool United on loan. Nolan made his Hartlepool United debut on 24 November 2007, in a 2–1 loss against Gillingham. After making eleven appearances, Nolan then returned to Ewood Park following a two-month loan spell with Hartlepool.

=== Preston North End ===
On 6 October 2008 he joined Preston North End on a three-month loan deal. Nolan made his Preston North End debut three days later, in a 1–0 win over Doncaster Rovers.

Nolan then signed a permanent three-and-a-half-year contract on 2 January 2009. Nolan's first appearance after signing for the club on a permanent basis came on 3 January 2009, coming on as a substitute for Callum Davidson. He has made 23 appearances in total (3 as a substitute) mainly filling in at left back as cover for Callum Davidson.

In 2009–10 season, Nolan continued to be used in the left-back position in Davidson's absent until Nolan's form was bad. As a result, Nolan joined Sheffield Wednesday on loan until the end of the season, where he's reunited with Alan Irvine. After appearing on the bench against Ipswich Town. Nolan made his Sheffield Wednesday debut on 27 February 2010, in a 5–0 loss against Reading. Nolan then scored his first Sheffield Wednesday goal on 24 March 2010, in a 2–1 win against Watford. Nolan had become regular football throughout the season, but couldn't help Sheffield Wednesday survive in the Championship, as they were relegated to League One.

After his loan spell with Sheffield Wednesday came to an end, Nolan was told by Manager Darren Ferguson that he no longer have a future at Preston North End by placing him on the transfer list. Irvine tried to sign Nolan on a permanent basis, but it was unsuccessful, due to the club's financial situation at the time.

=== Scunthorpe United ===
On 7 July 2010, he joined Championship's rival Scunthorpe United on an initial six-month loan with a view to a permanent deal.

He made his debut for Scunthorpe in a 2–1 win over Reading on 7 August 2010. The deal was made permanent on 6 January 2011, until the end of the season, for an undisclosed fee. Though the club was relegated to League One, Nolan went on to make thirty-eight appearances in all competitions despite missing out ten matches, mostly on the bench, competing against Cliff Byrne over a right-back position and loss of form towards the end of the season. At the end of the 2010–11 season, Nolan signed a contract with the club.

The 2011–12 season saw Nolan started well, playing as a left back and then scored his first Scunthorpe United goal, in a 2–1 win over Stevenage on 1 October 2011. His impressive display in defense and attack in recent matches was praised by Manager Alan Knill. Soon, Nolan injured his calf while walking up stairs and only missing one match, Nolan made his return to the match against Milton Keynes Dons on 22 October 2011. Nolan soon missed six matches for months, having been not included in the starting line-up before being recalled to the first team, playing in an unfamiliar defensive midfield role against Preston North End and Yeovil Town. Nolan made thirty-five appearances in all competitions and scoring once in all competitions. At the end of the 2011–12 season, Nolan was released by the club in May 2012.

After being released by Scunthorpe United and failed to find a new club, Nolan returned to the club to train with the squad in effort to regain his fitness, though contract was ruled out, stated by Manager Brian Laws. However, Laws was keen to sign Nolan. Eventually, on 8 February 2013, Scunthorpe United re-signed Nolan, until the end of the season, on non-contract terms. Nolan's first appearance for Scunthorpe United since returning came against Yeovil Town on 16 February 2013, coming on as a substitute for Callum Kennedy in the 83rd minute, in a 3–0 loss against Yeovil Town. Nolan then went on to make twelve appearances for the club and taking over the right-back position after Callum Kennedy missed out for the rest of the season. Despite the club was relegated to League Two, his successful return for the club earned him a new contract with the club.

In 2013–14 season, Nolan featured in the first team regularly, playing at right back, left back and central midfield. But unfortunately, Nolan was injured during a 2–2 draw against Burton Albion in the 21st minute and had to be substituted as a result. After a scan, it was announced that Nolan was out of action for six weeks. After announcing his return, Nolan made his return on 23 November 2013, coming on as a substitute for Deon Burton in the 86th minute, in a 2–1 loss against Portsmouth. After making his return, Nolan went on to make forty appearances in all competitions to help the club to promotion into League One as League Two runners-up. Nolan also signed a one-year contract extension with the club.

In 2014–15 season, Nolan started four out of six matches in the first six matches before suffering a neck injury and then hamstring injury. Having just recovered from a hamstring injury, Nolan made his return, playing 90 minutes, in the first round of FA Cup, in a 2–0 win over Forest Green Rovers. Just after making his return, Nolan, however, suffered ankle injury that kept him out for four to six weeks. After featuring three matches in early-January, Nolan missed nine matches due to being on the bench and failed to feature on the matchday squad. After being featured against Barnsley on 24 February 2015, Nolan had not being featured throughout the season and at the end of the 2014–15 season, Nolan was among many players to be released by the club (which was also the second time Nolan was released).

=== York City ===
On 6 July 2015, Nolan signed a one-year contract with League Two club York City. He left the club by mutual consent on 25 January 2016.

=== Blackpool ===
On 3 August 2016, Nolan signed for newly relegated League Two club Blackpool on a one-year contract. He was released at the end of the 2016–17 season.

=== Crewe Alexandra ===
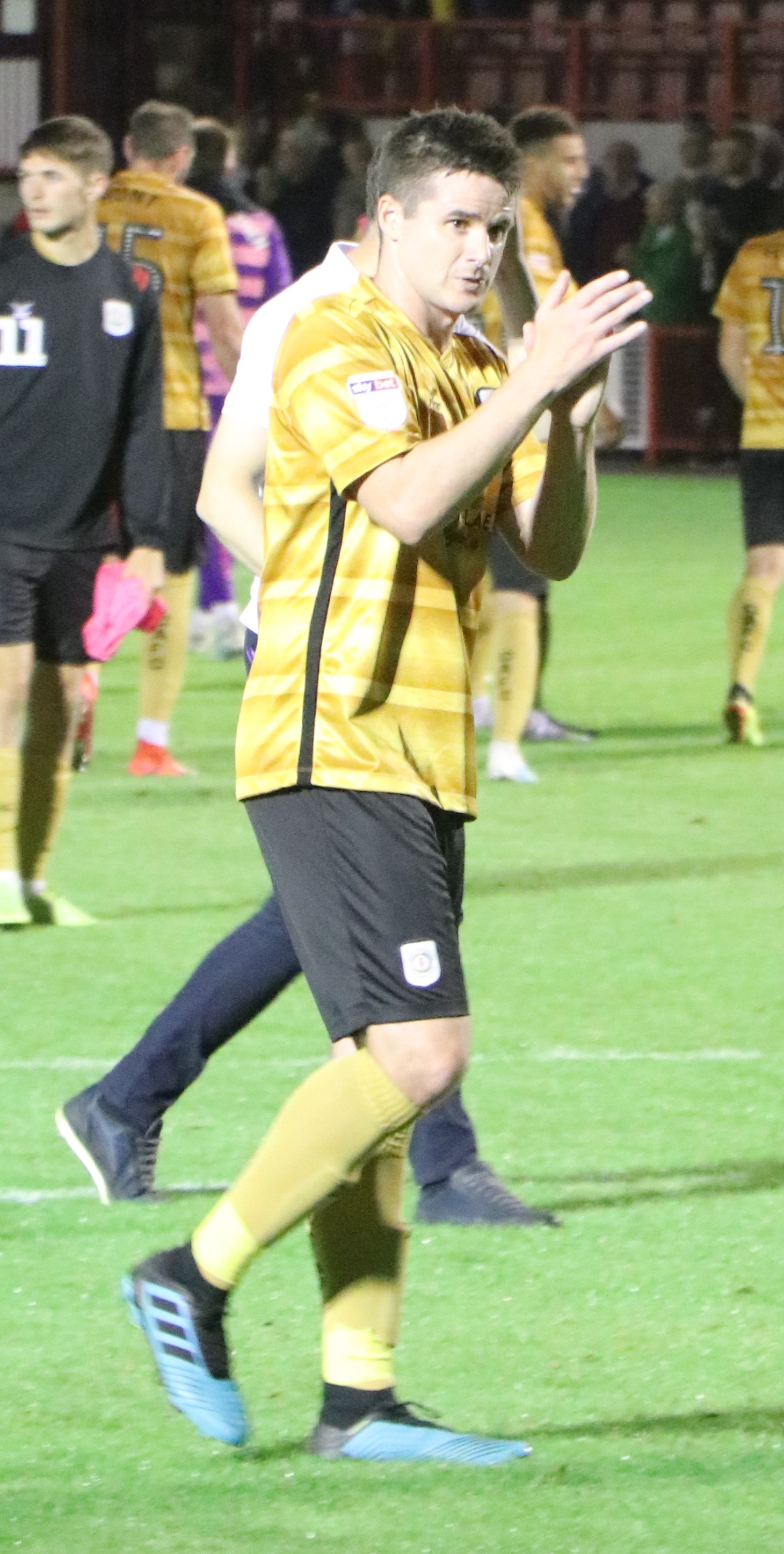
Nolan with Crewe Alexandra in 2019

Nolan signed for League Two club Crewe Alexandra on 3 July 2017 on a one-year contract, with the option of a further year based on appearances. After making 30 appearances, the contract extension was triggered in March 2018. Nolan scored his first Crewe goal in an FA Cup tie against Blackburn Rovers at Crewe on 7 December 2017. His first league goal came when he headed the winner in a 2–1 victory over Colchester United at Gresty Road on 26 January 2019. The following month, he signed a two-year deal to stay at Crewe until the summer of 2021.

On 1 February 2021, Nolan joined Scottish Premiership club Motherwell on loan for the remainder of the season. On 13 May 2021, Crewe announced that Nolan was being released.

=== Waterford ===
On 9 July 2021, Nolan signed for his hometown club Waterford in the League of Ireland Premier Division. He made a total of 18 appearances in all competitions over the season as they were relegated to the League of Ireland First Division. His final appearance in football came on 11 August 2023 in a 2–2 draw with Galway United, as he announced his retirement from professional football 5 days later.

== International career ==
He has been capped for the Republic of Ireland at all levels and he also captained the under-21 team. He has also played in a B team match against Nottingham Forest.

On 7 February 2009, he received his first call-up to the senior team to play Georgia on 11 February 2009. Nolan finally made his Republic of Ireland debut on 29 May 2009, in a 1–1 draw against Nigeria.

== Career statistics ==
=== Club ===
As of match played 11 August 2023

Appearances and goals by club, season and competition
Club	Season	League			National Cup		League Cup		Other		Total	
Club	Season	Division	Apps	Goals	Apps	Goals	Apps	Goals	Apps	Goals	Apps	Goals
Blackburn Rovers	2006–07	Premier League	0	0	0	0	0	0	1 (Note: Appearance in UEFA Cup)	0	1	0
Blackburn Rovers	2007–08	Premier League	0	0	—		0	0	0	0	0	0
Blackburn Rovers	2008–09	Premier League	0	0	—		0	0	—		0	0
Blackburn Rovers	Total		0	0	0	0	0	0	1	0	1	0
Stockport County (loan)	2006–07	League Two	4	0	—		—		—		4	0
Hartlepool United (loan)	2007–08	League One	11	0	1	0	—		—		12	0
Preston North End	2008–09	Championship	21	0	1	0	—		2 (Note: Appearances in Championship play-offs)	0	24	0
Preston North End	2009–10	Championship	19	0	1	0	2	0	—		22	0
Preston North End	Total		40	0	2	0	2	0	2	0	46	0
Sheffield Wednesday (loan)	2009–10	Championship	14	1	—		—		—		14	1
Scunthorpe United	2010–11	Championship	35	0	1	0	2	0	—		38	0
Scunthorpe United	2011–12	League One	30	1	2	0	2	0	2 (Note: Appearance(s) in Football League Trophy)	0	36	1
Scunthorpe United	2012–13	League One	12	0	0	0	0	0	0	0	12	0
Scunthorpe United	2013–14	League Two	39	0	0	0	0	0	1	0	40	0
Scunthorpe United	2014–15	League One	6	0	3	0	2	0	0	0	11	0
Scunthorpe United	Total		122	1	6	0	6	0	3	0	137	1
York City	2015–16	League Two	15	1	1	0	1	0	1	0	18	1
Blackpool	2016–17	League Two	3	0	1	0	2	0	4 (Note: Appearance(s) in EFL Trophy)	0	10	0
Crewe Alexandra	2017–18	League Two	42	0	2	1	1	0	2	0	47	1
Crewe Alexandra	2018–19	League Two	33	1	1	0	1	0	1	0	36	1
Crewe Alexandra	2019–20	League Two	19	3	2	0	2	0	3	0	26	3
Crewe Alexandra	2020–21	League One	0	0	0	0	0	0	2	0	2	0
Crewe Alexandra	Total		94	4	5	1	4	0	8	0	111	5
Motherwell (loan)	2020–21	Scottish Premiership	0	0	0	0	0	0	—		0	0
Waterford	2021	LOI Premier Division	14	0	3	0	—		1 (Note: Appearances in 2021 League of Ireland promotion/relegation playoffs)	0	18	0
Waterford	2022	LOI First Division	17	1	0	0	—		2 (Note: 1 appearance in the Munster Senior Cup & 1 appearance in the 2022 League of Ireland promotion/relegation playoffs)	0	19	1
Waterford	2023	LOI First Division	16	1	0	0	—		0	0	16	1
Waterford	Total		47	2	3	0	—		3	0	53	2
Career total			350	9	19	1	15	0	22	0	406	10

=== International ===
As of match played 8 September 2009

Appearances and goals by national team and year
National team	Year	Apps	Goals
Republic of Ireland	2009	3	0
Total		3	0

== Honours ==
Scunthorpe United

- Football League Two runner-up: 2013–14

Blackpool

- EFL League Two play-offs: 2017

Individual

- Crewe Alexandra Player of the Season: 2017–18
- Crewe Alexandra Players' Player of the Season: 2017–18
