= Marcus Poscha =

English footballer

Personal information
- Full name: Marcus Anthony Poscha
- Date of birth: 10 October 1996 (age 30)
- Place of birth: Rochdale, England
- Height: 1.85 m (6 ft 1 in)
- Position: Defender

Team information
- Current team: Curzon Ashton
- Number: 4

Youth career
- –2014: Bury

Senior career*
Years	Team	Apps	(Gls)
2014–2016	Bury	1	(0)
2015–2016	→ Ramsbottom United (loan)	10	(1)
2016	→ Stockport County (loan)	3	(0)
2016–2017	Crewe Alexandra	0	(0)
2017	Ramsbottom United	5	(0)
2017–2018	Halesowen Town		
2018–2020	Colne	43	(0)
2020–	Curzon Ashton	44	(1)
2020	→ Clitheroe (loan)	1	(0)
- * Club domestic league appearances and goals as of 23:18, 24 September 2022 (UTC)

Marcus Anthony Poscha (born 10 October 1996) is an English footballer who plays as a defender for Curzon Ashton.

== Career ==
=== Bury ===
Born in Rochdale, Greater Manchester, Poscha joined the youth system of Bury. In the 2013–14 season he played in every youth team game, making 28 appearances as the side reached the Lancashire FA Senior Cup final. He made his professional debut on 3 May 2014, coming on as a substitute for Scott Burgess in the second half of the 0–0 draw with Morecambe. In February 2015, Poscha signed his first professional contract with the club.

However, Poscha failed to make a breakthrough at Bury and was loaned out to Ramsbottom United, where he made ten appearances and scored once for the side. In March 2016, Poscha was loaned out again to Stockport County and went on to make three appearances during his time there.

At the end of the 2015–16 season, Poscha was released by the club.

=== Crewe Alexandra ===
After trials for various clubs over the summer, Poscha signed a deal with Crewe Alexandra until the end of the season on 9 September 2016.

However, Poscha was sent straight to the U23 squad, where he played for most of the season. At the end of the 2016–2017, without making a single appearance for the Crewe Alexandra first team, he was released by the club.

=== Non-League ===
Following his release from Crewe, he signed for Northern Premier League Division One North side Ramsbottom United in September 2017, where he had previously had a loan spell. He only spent a month at the club, then he moved up a division to play for Northern Premier League Premier Division side Halesowen Town. He spent the remainder of the campaign with Halesowen before dropping down a division again to play for Northern Premier League Division One West side Colne. In August 2020, he stepped up two divisions to sign for National League North side Curzon Ashton, joining manager Steve Cunningham who had also managed him at Colne. In September 2020, he had a short loan spell at Northern Premier League Division One West side Clitheroe.

== Career statistics ==
As of match played 13 September 2022

Appearances and goals by club, season and competition
Club	Season	League			FA Cup		League Cup		Other		Total	
Club	Season	Division	Apps	Goals	Apps	Goals	Apps	Goals	Apps	Goals	Apps	Goals
Bury	2013–14	League Two	1	0	0	0	0	0	0	0	1	0
Bury	2014–15	League Two	0	0	0	0	0	0	0	0	0	0
Bury	2015–16	League One	0	0	0	0	0	0	0	0	0	0
Bury	Total		1	0	0	0	0	0	0	0	1	0
Ramsbottom United (loan)	2015–16	NPL Premier Division	10	1	0	0	—		2 (Note: Appearances in FA Trophy)	0	12	1
Stockport County (loan)	2015–16	National League North	3	0	—		—		—		3	0
Crewe Alexandra	2016–17	League Two	0	0	0	0	0	0	0	0	0	0
Ramsbottom United	2017–18	NPL Division One North	5	0	—		—		—		5	0
Colne	2018–19	NPL Division One West	19	0	—		—		1 (Note: Appearances in Lancashire FA Challenge Trophy)	0	20	0
Colne	2019–20	NPL Division One North West	24	0	7	0	—		7 (Note: Six appearances in FA Trophy, one in Lancashire FA Challenge Trophy, one in League Challenge Cup)	0	38	0
Colne	Total		43	0	7	0	—		8	0	58	0
Curzon Ashton	2020–21	National League North	7	0	1	0	—		0	0	8	0
Curzon Ashton	2021–22	National League North	29	4	3	0	—		2	0	34	4
Curzon Ashton	2022–23	National League North	8	0	1	0	—		0	0	9	0
Curzon Ashton	Total		44	4	5	0	—		2	0	51	4
Clitheroe (loan)	2020–21	NPL Division One North West	1	0	—		—		—		1	0
Career total			107	5	12	0	0	0	12	0	131	5
