= Curzon Ashton F.C. =

Association football club in Greater Manchester, England

Coordinates: 53°29′35″N 2°6′56″W

Curzon Ashton
- Full name: Curzon Ashton Football Club
- Nickname: The Nash
- Founded: 1963; 63 years ago (as Curzon Amateurs)
- Ground: Tameside Stadium
- Capacity: 4,000
- Chairman: Jim Newall
- Manager: Adam Barton
- League: Northern Premier League Premier Division
- 2025–26: National League North, 21st of 24 (relegated)
- Website: curzon-ashton.co.uk
Home colours	Away colours

Curzon Ashton Football Club is an association football club based in Ashton-under-Lyne, Greater Manchester, England. Founded in 1963 and nicknamed "The Nash", the club is affiliated to the Manchester Football Association and currently (2026/27) competes in the Northern Premier League (NPL), at the seventh tier of English football. Curzon Ashton won Division One North of the NPL in the 2013–14 season, and the Premier Division play-offs in the 2014–15 season, thereby gaining promotion to the National League North. Home matches have been played at Tameside Stadium since 2005.

== History ==
=== Early years ===
Curzon Ashton was formed in 1963 after the merger of two clubs, Curzon Road Methodists F.C. and Ashton Amateurs F.C., who played in the Manchester Amateur Football League. The amalgamated club's name was originally Curzon Amateurs before being changed to the current name.

Curzon joined the Manchester League. In 1970–71, they were Manchester Intermediate Cup runners-up, followed by a hat-trick of wins in the competition. In 1973–74, they were runners-up in Division One of the Manchester League and then runners-up in the Premier Division, a feat they matched the following season. The reserve team then won four championships in a row and in 1977–78 the league and cup double.

By this time they were playing at National Park, former home of pre-war club Ashton National. From this they acquired their nickname of 'The Nash.'

The 1978–79 season saw Curzon become founder members of the Cheshire League Division Two and they won promotion at the first attempt, missing the title by just two points. In their first season in the top flight, they became the first North West club to reach the semi-final of the FA Vase. They lost both legs 2–0 to Stamford, the home leg producing the club's record home attendance of 1,800.

=== 1980s and 1990s ===
In the 1980s, Curzon won the Manchester Premier Cup five times. In 1983–84, Curzon became founder members of the North West Counties League when the MWCL Cheshire League and Lancashire Combination merged as part of the non-League pyramid. The club was placed in the first division and floodlights were purchased in 1986 as Curzon prepared for an assault on the title and possible promotion to the Northern Premier League. Promotion was not attained and manager Peter Mayo resigned due to work commitments during the 1986 season. His successor Les Sutton failed to win a single league game, although the club won the Manchester Premier Cup. He was sacked at the end of the season.

Despite finishing in a relegation position, Curzon became founder members of the Northern Premier League First Division the following year. A disastrous start resulted in manager David Noble being sacked and Steve Waywell became the club's fourth manager in less than 12 months when he was appointed in October 1987. Relegation was only avoided when the division was expanded from 19 to 22 clubs. Waywell was relieved of his duties in February 1993, and after Alan Zelem briefly held the reins, Winsford United assistant manager David "Taffy" Jones was appointed, following which Curzon recorded their best ever win against local rivals Ashton United, beating them 7–0 on Easter Monday.

The 1995–96 season saw Curzon finish 4th in the league table, their best ever position, under the guidance of Derek Brownbill, but before the start of the 1996–97 season Brownbill resigned and joined Runcorn F.C. Halton. Vauxhall GM manager Terry McLean took over, only to resign in September. Changes were taking place in the boardroom and Dave Denby was appointed to succeed McLean, bringing with him Ged Coyne as his assistant.

The team struggled and Denby resigned before the end of the season, with Coyne being invited to take over. After finishing in a relegation position along with other North West-based clubs Warrington Town and Atherton Laburnum Rovers, Curzon moved to the Northern Counties East League following a meeting of the Northern Joint Liaison Committee (NJLC), a decision which shocked not only the club but many others connected with football in the region. An appeal to the National League System Sub-Committee proved to be fruitless and so the club became the first side to be moved in this way since the pyramid system was introduced.

Many difficulties in the Northern Counties East League followed with the club ending the season next to bottom. The NJLC moved Curzon back to the North West Counties league at the end of the 1997–98 season.

In November 1998, Joe Murty was appointed manager and brought Martin Farnworth in as his assistant. The 1999–2000 season saw the club gain promotion to Division One of the First North Western Trains League.

=== 2000–2010 ===
In June 2000, Joe Murty was relieved of managerial duties and replaced with Gary Lowe. In the 2000–2001 season Lowe took the club to the Worthington Challenge Trophy Final where they lost in a penalty shoot-out. They finished in eighth position in the table.

After playing at National Park for twenty years, Curzon moved to the £4 million Tameside Stadium at the beginning of the 2005–06 season.

On Saturday, 3 March 2007, they beat Leamington 4–1 to reach the semi-final of the FA Vase for the second time in their history. They were beaten in the semi-final 3–2 over two legs by Truro City, but were promoted to the Northern Premier League as runners up to F.C. United of Manchester. They also were runners-up to F.C. United of Manchester in the North West Counties League Challenge Cup, losing the final 2–1. In the 2006–07 season, they lost 3–2 at the same stage to Macclesfield Town.

In the 2008–09 season, Curzon reached the first round proper of the FA Cup for the first time, where they defeated League Two side Exeter City 3–2. They went on to lose 2–0 away to Conference National club Kidderminster Harriers in the second round. For the second season in a row, they reached the end-of-season play-offs. In the semi-final, Curzon beat Skelmersdale United, before losing to Newcastle Blue Star in the final.

=== 2010–present ===
Following Gary Lowe's move to neighbours Hyde United, John Flanagan took charge of the club in the summer of 2011. In his first season at the helm, he guided Curzon to a 2nd-place finish, the highest in the club's history, before losing a play-off final to Witton Albion.

The 2012–13 season saw the club reach the Northern Premier League Challenge Cup final where they narrowly lost in a penalty shoot-out against North Ferriby United. The 2013–14 season saw Curzon win a league championship for the first time in 36 years, a last minute Niall Cummins winning goal against Harrogate Railway Athletic sealing the league title. They finished the season with 99 points, losing just five games throughout the campaign, and gained promotion to the NPL Premier Division, non-League's third tier. The following season the team won the play-offs, beating Ilkeston 1–0 in the final thanks to a first half goal from defender Simon Woodford while also overcoming local rivals Ashton United along the way in the semi-finals, in order to gain consecutive promotions to the National League North, the second tier of the non-League pyramid and highest level in the club's history.

The 2015–16 season saw the highest ever finish in the club's history, finishing 11th in the National League North in manager John Flanagan's 5th season in charge.

The 2016–2017 season saw the club finishing 14th in the National League North. They also equalled their best ever FA Cup run by making it to the Second Round of the competition. They were knocked out following a 4–3 defeat against AFC Wimbledon.

At the end of the 2019–20 season, Mark Bradshaw was removed from his position as manager due to the COVID-19 pandemic. He was replaced by former Colne FC manager, Steve Cunningham.

Part way through the 2021–2022 season, Steve Cunningham was sacked and replaced by former coach Adam Lakeland. He was supported in his role by former player Alex Brown as Assistant Manager.

In the 2023–24 season, Adam Lakeland was signed partway through the season by King's Lynn Town. Craig Mahon became player-manager and helped guide the club to 7th in the National League North. This not only surpassed their previous highest position of 11th under John Flanagan but also marked the first time that Curzon had qualified for the National League North Play-Offs. They were eliminated by Chorley in the quarter finals, losing 4-2 in the penalty shootout.

== Stadium ==
Curzon Ashton have played at the Tameside Stadium in Ashton-under-Lyne since 2005, which has a capacity of 4,000 (524 seats). It meets the standards for the National League.

The stadium was officially opened by Sir Alex Ferguson. For the first game at the new ground, Curzon played a Manchester United XI which included Gerard Piqué, Giuseppe Rossi, Fraizer Campbell and Jonny Evans. Outside the stadium, a statue stands commemorating three locally born footballers associated with the World Cup; Geoff Hurst (born in Ashton), Jimmy Armfield (Denton), and Simone Perrotta (also born in Ashton).

== Women's team ==
Curzon Ashton have a women's team called Curzon Ashton L.F.C. who play in the Midland Combination Women's Football League.

== Players ==
=== First-team squad ===
As of 22 August 2026

Note: Flags indicate national team as defined under FIFA eligibility rules; some limited exceptions apply. Players may hold more than one non-FIFA nationality.

No.	Pos.	Nation	Player
—	GK	ENG	Aidan Dowling
—	GK	ENG	Josh Ollerenshaw
—	DF	ENG	Joel Amado
—	DF	ENG	Chi Ezennolim
—	DF	ENG	Marcus Poscha
—	DF	ENG	Jordan Richards
—	DF	IRL	Timi Sobowale
—	MF	NIR	Adam Barton (player-manager)
—	MF	ENG	Alex Curran
—	MF	ENG	Harvey Hayhurst

No.	Pos.	Nation	Player
—	MF	ENG	Joe Nolan
—	MF	ENG	Harry Olufowobi
—	MF	ENG	Harvey Roberts
—	MF	ENG	Jack Stobbs
—	MF	ENG	Danny Whitehead
—	FW	ENG	Brad Holmes
—	FW	ENG	Ola Lawal
—	FW	ENG	Jimmy Spencer (captain)
—	FW	ENG	George Wilson

== Club officials ==
Position	Staff
Manager	Adam Barton
Assistant Manager	Jordan Richards
First Team Coach	Jack Salkeld
Goalkeeper Coach	Kieran Bentley
Analyst	Kieran Kozyra
Physiotherapist	Ben Blease
Chairman	Jim Newall
Secretary	Rob Hurst

== Honours and club records ==
- Northern Premier League Premier Division : Playoff Winners 2014–2015
- Northern Premier League Division One North: champions 2013–14
- Doodson Sport Cup best performance: Final – 2012–13
- FA Cup best performance: second round proper – 2008–09, 2016–17
- FA Trophy best performance: third round proper – 2021–22, 2025–26
- FA Vase best performance: semi-finals – 1979–80, 2006–07
- Top Goalscorer: Rod Lawton, 376 goals
