= Joe Robbins (footballer) =

English footballer

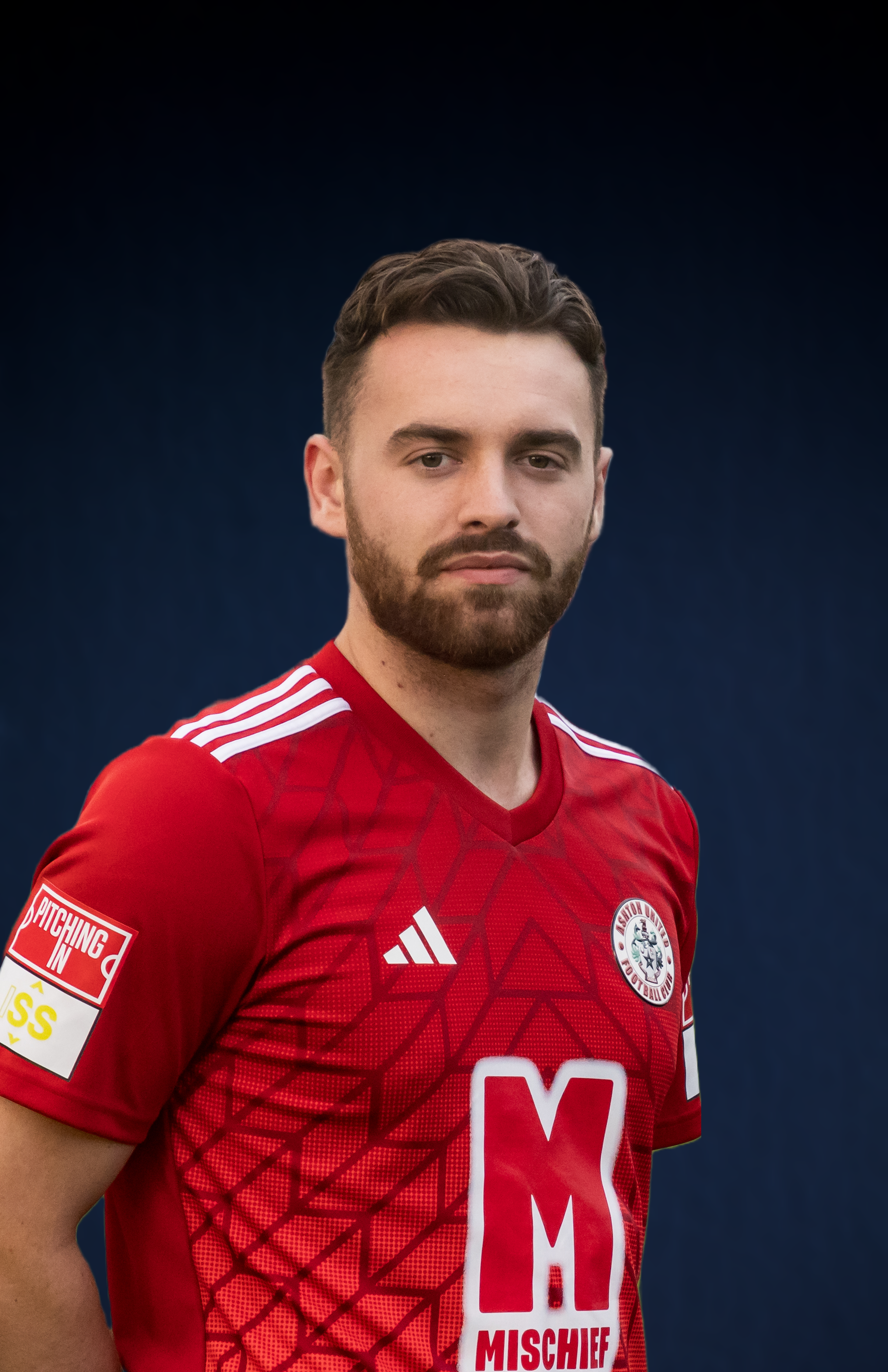

Personal information
- Full name: Joseph Aidan Thomas Robbins
- Date of birth: 20 February 2002 (age 24)
- Place of birth: Manchester, England
- Height: 5 ft 9 in (1.76 m)
- Position: Midfielder

Team information
- Current team: Bamber Bridge

Youth career
- –2020: Crewe Alexandra

Senior career*
Years	Team	Apps	(Gls)
2020–2022	Crewe Alexandra	0	(0)
2020	→ Altrincham (loan)	5	(0)
2021–2022	→ Nantwich Town (loan)	21	(3)
2022	Nantwich Town	6	(0)
2022	Ashton United	3	(0)
2022–	Bamber Bridge	0	(0)
- * Club domestic league appearances and goals as of 22:12, 24 September 2022 (UTC)

Joseph Aidan Thomas Robbins (born 20 February 2002) is an English professional footballer who plays as a midfielder for Bamber Bridge.

== Career ==
As a youth, he played for Liverpool, Manchester City, followed by Manchester United. After being let go from Manchester United, he joined Crewe Alexandra. A graduate of Crewe Alexandra's Academy, he signed a professional contract in 2020. In October 2020, he went on a month's loan to Altrincham.

Upon returning to Crewe, he made his Crewe debut on 9 November 2021 in an EFL Trophy group game against Wolves Under-21s, scoring the third goal in a 3–0 win at Gresty Road.

On 24 December 2021, Robbins went on a short-term loan to Nantwich Town of the Northern Premier League Premier Division, later extended to the end of the season. On 15 February 2022, in his 9th appearance, Robbins scored a hat-trick in the Dabbers' 5–1 win at Stalybridge Celtic.

Following Crewe's relegation to League Two, Robbins was released at the end of the 2021–22 season.

In August 2022, it was announced that he had signed for Northern Premier League Premier Division side Nantwich Town on a permanent deal, having impressed during pre-season. He left a month later on 12 September to join fellow divisional rivals Ashton United who were challenging towards the top of the table after a good start to the season.

In December 2022, Robbins signed for fellow Northern Premier League Premier Division side Bamber Bridge.

== Career statistics ==
As of as of match played 24 September 2022

Appearances and goals by club, season and competition
Club	Season	League			FA Cup		League Cup		Other		Total	
Club	Season	Division	Apps	Goals	Apps	Goals	Apps	Goals	Apps	Goals	Apps	Goals
Crewe Alexandra	2020–21	League One	0	0	0	0	0	0	0	0	0	0
Crewe Alexandra	2021–22	League One	0	0	0	0	0	0	1 (Note: Appearances in EFL Trophy)	1	1	1
Crewe Alexandra	Total		0	0	0	0	0	0	1	1	1	1
Altrincham (loan)	2021–22	National League	5	0	—		—		—		5	0
Nantwich Town (loan)	2021–22	NPL Premier Division	21	3	—		—		—		21	3
Nantwich Town	2022–23	NPL Premier Division	6	0	1	0	—		0	0	7	0
Nantwich Town	Total		27	3	1	0	—		0	0	28	3
Ashton United	2022–23	NPL Premier Division	3	0	—		—		0	0	3	0
Career total			35	3	1	0	0	0	2	1	38	4
