= 2021–22 Tottenham Hotspur F.C. season =

English football club season

Tottenham Hotspur
2021–22 season
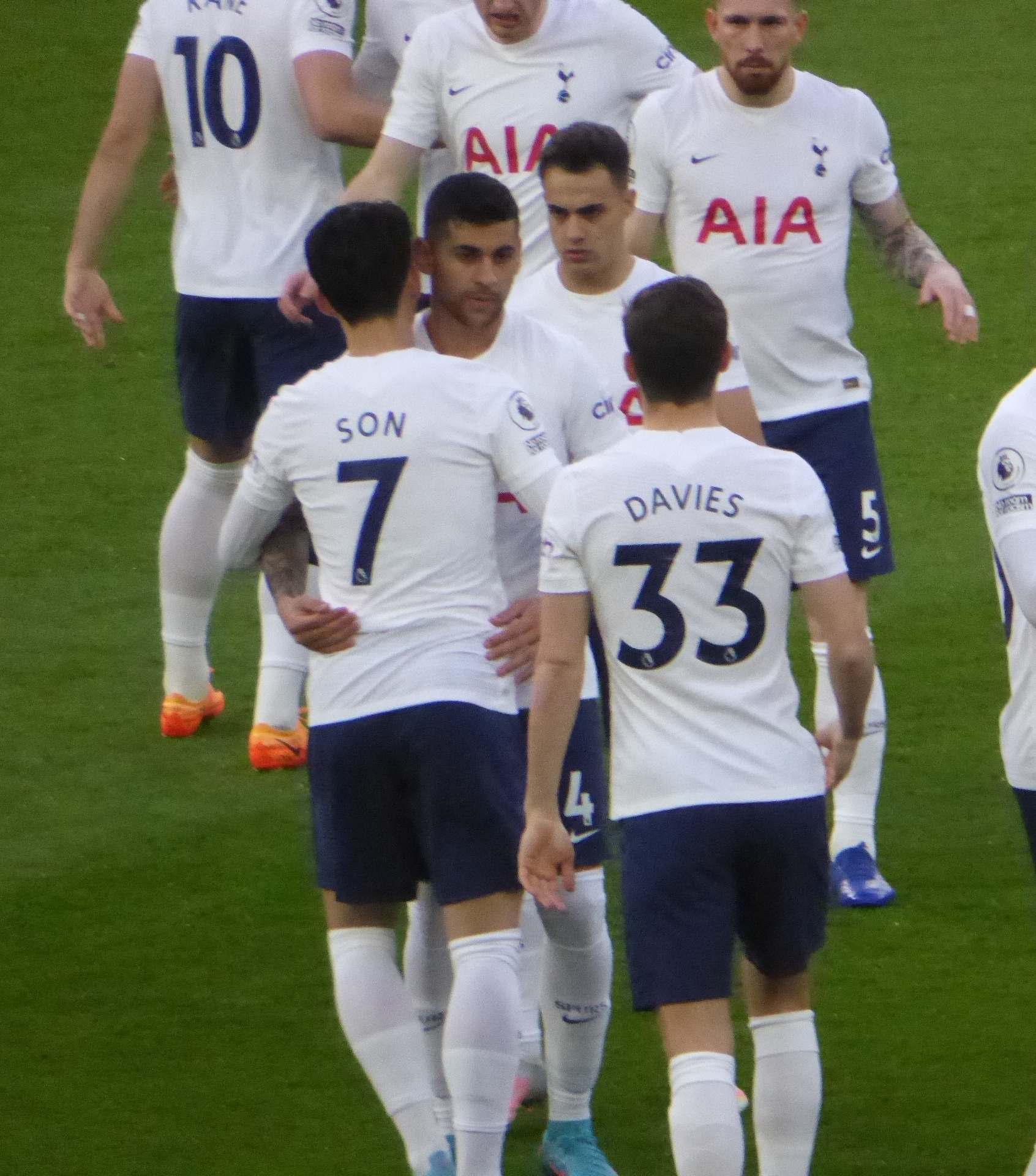
- Spurs players in March 2022
- Owner: ENIC International Ltd.
- Chairman: Daniel Levy
- Head coach: Nuno Espírito Santo (until 1 November); Antonio Conte (from 2 November)
- Stadium: Tottenham Hotspur Stadium
- Premier League: 4th
- FA Cup: Fifth round
- EFL Cup: Semi-finals
- UEFA Europa Conference League: Group stage
- Top goalscorer: League: Son Heung-min (23); All: Harry Kane (27)
- Highest home attendance: 62,027 v Arsenal; 12 May 2022
- Lowest home attendance: League: 40,539 v Crystal Palace, 28 December 2021; All: 25,121 v Mura, 30 September 2021
- Average home league attendance: 56,523
- Biggest win: 5–0 v Everton (7 March 2022); 5–0 v Norwich City (22 May 2022)
- Biggest defeat: 0–3 v Crystal Palace (11 September 2021); 0–3 v Chelsea (19 September 2021); 0–3 v Manchester United (30 October 2021); 0–3 (awd.) v Rennes (9 December 2021)
Home colours	Away colours	Third colours

The 2021–22 season was Tottenham Hotspur's 30th season in the Premier League, 44th successive season in the top division of the English football league system and 140th season in existence. After finishing seventh in the 2020–21 Premier League, Tottenham qualified for the play-off round of the newly formed UEFA Europa Conference League. At the end of June, the club announced Nuno Espírito Santo as the new head coach on a two-year contract. However, Tottenham announced that they had removed Nuno, along with his coaching staff Ian Cathro, Rui Barbosa and Antonio Dias, stating they had been "relieved of their duties" on 1 November 2021. Antonio Conte was appointed as Nuno's successor the following day.

== Season squad ==
Squad No.	Name	Nationality	Position(s)	Date of birth (age)
Goalkeepers
1	Hugo Lloris (C)	(France)	GK	26 December 1986 (aged 35)
22	Pierluigi Gollini	(Italy)	GK	18 March 1995 (aged 27)
40	Brandon Austin	(United States)	GK	7 January 1999 (aged 23)
Defenders
2	Matt Doherty	(Republic of Ireland)	RB / RWB	16 January 1992 (aged 30)
3	Sergio Reguilón	(Spain)	LB / LWB	16 December 1996 (aged 25)
4	Cristian Romero	(Argentina)	CB	27 April 1998 (aged 24)
6	Davinson Sánchez	(Colombia)	CB	12 June 1996 (aged 26)
12	Emerson Royal	(Brazil)	RB / RWB	14 January 1999 (aged 23)
14	Joe Rodon	(Wales)	CB	22 October 1997 (aged 24)
15	Eric Dier	(England)	CB	15 January 1994 (aged 28)
19	Ryan Sessegnon	(England)	LB / LWB	18 May 2000 (aged 22)
25	Japhet Tanganga	(England)	RB / CB	31 March 1999 (aged 23)
33	Ben Davies	(Wales)	CB / LB	24 April 1993 (aged 29)
Midfielders
5	Pierre-Emile Højbjerg	(Denmark)	DM / CM	5 August 1995 (aged 26)
8	Harry Winks	(England)	CM / DM	2 February 1996 (aged 26)
29	Oliver Skipp	(England)	DM / CM	16 September 2000 (aged 21)
30	Rodrigo Bentancur	(Uruguay)	DM / CM	25 June 1997 (aged 25)
Forwards
7	Son Heung-min	(South Korea)	LW / ST / RW / SS	8 July 1992 (aged 29)
10	Harry Kane (VC)	(England)	ST / SS	28 July 1993 (aged 28)
21	Dejan Kulusevski	(Sweden)	RW / LW	25 April 2000 (aged 22)
23	Steven Bergwijn	(Netherlands)	LW / RW	8 October 1997 (aged 24)
27	Lucas Moura	(Brazil)	RW / LW / SS	13 August 1992 (aged 29)
Out on loan
11	Bryan Gil	(Spain)	LW / RW / AM	11 February 2001 (aged 21)
18	Giovani Lo Celso	(Argentina)	CM / AM	9 April 1996 (aged 26)
28	Tanguy Ndombele	(France)	AM / CM	28 December 1996 (aged 25)
38	Cameron Carter-Vickers	(United States)	CB	31 December 1997 (aged 24)
41	Alfie Whiteman	(England)	GK	2 October 1998 (aged 23)
47	Jack Clarke	(England)	RW / LW	23 November 2000 (aged 21)
–	Pape Matar Sarr	(Senegal)	CM	14 September 2002 (aged 19)

Last updated: 31 January 2022.
Source: Tottenham Hotspur F.C., Premier League

== Transfers ==
=== Released ===
Date from	Position	Nationality	Name	To	Notes	Ref.
1 July 2021	CM	(England)	Chay Cooper	(England) Colchester United	Released	
1 July 2021	RB	(England)	Keenan Ferguson	(England) Boston United	Released	(Note: After being released, Ferguson signed for Boston United.)
1 July 2021	GK	(Argentina)	Paulo Gazzaniga	(England) Fulham	Released	(Note: After being released, Gazzaniga signed for Fulham.)
1 July 2021	DM	(England)	George Marsh	(England) AFC Wimbledon	Released	(Note: After being released, Marsh signed for AFC Wimbledon.)
1 July 2021	CM	(Cyprus)	Jack Roles	(England) Crystal Palace	Released	(Note: After being released, Roles had a trial with Crystal Palace and then was signed by the club on 1 July 2021.)
1 July 2021	LB	(England)	Danny Rose	(England) Watford	Released	(Note: After being released, Rose signed for Watford.)
1 July 2021	CB	(England)	Aaron Skinner	(England) Bamber Bridge	Released	
1 July 2021	CF	(England)	Kazaiah Sterling	(England) Potters Bar Town	Released	
1 July 2021	RW	(England)	Shilow Tracey	(England) Cambridge United	Released	(Note: After being released, Tracey signed for Cambridge United.)
1 July 2021	LW	(England)	Tarrelle Whittaker	(Wales) Swansea City	Released	(Note: After being released, Whittaker signed for Swansea City.)
1 July 2021	CF	(Ghana)	Enock Asante		Released	
1 July 2021	RM	(England)	Eddie Carrington		Released	
1 July 2021	CF	(England)	Rodel Richards		Released	
31 August 2021	RB	(Ivory Coast)	Serge Aurier	(Spain) Villarreal	Released	(Note: After being released, Aurier signed for Villarreal.)
21 September 2021	CM	(Wales)	Elliot Thorpe	(England) Luton Town	End of contract	(Note: After Thorpe's contract expired, he signed for Luton Town.)
7 December 2021	LB	(England)	Jeremy Kyezu		Mutual consent	
10 February 2022	CM	(Scotland)	Michael Craig	(England) Reading	Released	

- Note: Players will join other clubs after being released or terminated from their contract. Only the following clubs are mentioned when that club signed the player in the same transfer window.

=== Loans in ===
Date from	Position	Nationality	Name	From	Date until	Ref.
24 July 2021	GK	(Italy)	Pierluigi Gollini	(Italy) Atalanta	End of season	
6 August 2021	CB	(Argentina)	Cristian Romero	(Italy) Atalanta	End of season	
31 January 2022	RW	(Sweden)	Dejan Kulusevski	(Italy) Juventus	End of next season	

=== Loans out ===
Date from	Position	Nationality	Name	To	Date until	Ref.
29 July 2021	FW	(Republic of Ireland)	Troy Parrott	(England) Milton Keynes Dons	End of season	
2 August 2021	FW	(England)	Kion Etete	(England) Northampton Town	4 January 2022	
7 August 2021	MF	(England)	Jamie Bowden	(England) Oldham Athletic	10 January 2022	
12 August 2021	GK	(England)	Alfie Whiteman	(Sweden) Degerfors	December 2021	
27 August 2021	MF	(Senegal)	Pape Matar Sarr	(France) Metz	End of season	
31 August 2021	MF	(England)	J'Neil Bennett	(England) Crewe Alexandra	January 2022	
31 August 2021	DF	(United States)	Cameron Carter-Vickers	(Scotland) Celtic	End of season	
17 January 2022	FW	(England)	Kion Etete	(England) Cheltenham Town	End of season	
26 January 2022	RW	(England)	Jack Clarke	(England) Sunderland	End of season	
27 January 2022	CM	(England)	Nile John	(England) Charlton Athletic	April 2022	
31 January 2022	CM	(France)	Tanguy Ndombele	(France) Lyon	End of season	
31 January 2022	LW	(Spain)	Bryan Gil	(Spain) Valencia	End of season	
31 January 2022	CM	(Argentina)	Giovani Lo Celso	(Spain) Villarreal	End of season	
10 February 2022	GK	(England)	Alfie Whiteman	(Sweden) Degerfors	December 2022	
10 February 2022	GK	(Poland)	Kacper Kurylowicz	(England) Potters Bar Town	End of season	

=== Transfers in ===
Date from	Position	Nationality	Name	From	Fee	Ref.
26 July 2021	LW	(Spain)	Bryan Gil	(Spain) Sevilla	£21,600,000+Lamela	
27 August 2021	DM	(Senegal)	Pape Matar Sarr	(France) Metz	Undisclosed	
31 August 2021	RB	(Brazil)	Emerson Royal	(Spain) Barcelona	£25,800,000	
7 December 2021	LB	(England)	Charlie Sayers	(England) Southend United	Undisclosed	
31 January 2022	CM	(Uruguay)	Rodrigo Bentancur	(Italy) Juventus	£15,860,000	

=== Transfers out ===
Date from	Position	Nationality	Name	To	Fee	Ref.
11 June 2021	CB	(Argentina)	Juan Foyth	(Spain) Villarreal	Undisclosed	
26 July 2021	RW	(Argentina)	Erik Lamela	(Spain) Sevilla	Part exchange	
27 July 2021	DF	(Belgium)	Toby Alderweireld	(Qatar) Al-Duhail	£13,000,000	
3 August 2021	GK	(England)	Joe Hart	(Scotland) Celtic	Undisclosed	
5 August 2021	DF	(England)	Jubril Okedina	(England) Cambridge United	Undisclosed	
11 August 2021	DF	(England)	Dennis Cirkin	(England) Sunderland	Undisclosed	
17 August 2021	DF	(England)	Timothy Eyoma	(England) Lincoln City	Undisclosed	
27 August 2021	CM	(France)	Moussa Sissoko	(England) Watford	£3,000,000	
18 January 2022	RW	(England)	Dilan Markanday	(England) Blackburn Rovers	Undisclosed	
31 January 2022	AM	(England)	Dele Alli	(England) Everton	Free	

== Pre-season and friendlies ==
Tottenham scheduled an away match against Leyton Orient for the JE3 Foundation Trophy in memory of Justin Edinburgh. Tottenham then scheduled two friendlies, one away to Colchester United, and one away to Milton Keynes Dons. Tottenham announced the club would come together with both Arsenal and Chelsea to support mental health in The Mind Series in August 2021. They would play away to Chelsea and home to Arsenal.

17 July 2021 JE3 Foundation Trophy	Leyton Orient	1–1	Tottenham Hotspur	Leyton
15:00 BST	Sotiriou 72'	Report	Scarlett 38'	Stadium: Brisbane Road; Referee: John Busby

21 July 2021	Colchester United	0–3	Tottenham Hotspur	Colchester
19:45 BST	Wiredu (yellow card) 58'	Report	Son 11'; Lucas Moura 14'; Alli 38'	Stadium: JobServe Community Stadium; Referee: Craig Hicks

28 July 2021	Milton Keynes Dons	1–3	Tottenham Hotspur	Milton Keynes
19:45 BST	O'Riley (penalty missed) 4'; Freeman 84'	Report	Son 35'; Alli 57'; Lucas Moura 81'	Stadium: Stadium MK; Attendance: 15,795; Referee: John Busby

4 August 2021 The Mind Series	Chelsea	2–2	Tottenham Hotspur	Fulham
19:45 BST	Ziyech 16', 49'; Ampadu (yellow card) 83'	Report	Lucas Moura 56'; Bergwijn 70'	Stadium: Stamford Bridge; Attendance: 25,000; Referee: Keith Stroud

8 August 2021 The Mind Series	Tottenham Hotspur	1–0	Arsenal	Tottenham
14:00 BST	Alli (yellow card) 33'; Skipp (yellow card) 45+1'; Reguilón (yellow card) 74'; Son 79'	Report	Tierney (yellow card) 56'; Xhaka (yellow card) 57'	Stadium: Tottenham Hotspur Stadium; Attendance: 25,000; Referee: David Coote

== Competitions ==
=== Overview ===
Competition	First match	Last match	Starting round	Final position	Record							
Competition	First match	Last match	Starting round	Final position	Pld	W	D	L	GF	GA	GD	Win %
Premier League	15 August 2021	22 May 2022	Matchday 1	4th	38	22	5	11	69	40	+29	57.89
FA Cup	9 January 2022	1 March 2022	Third round	Fifth round	3	2	0	1	6	3	+3	66.67
EFL Cup	22 September 2021	12 January 2022	Third round	Semi-finals	5	2	1	2	5	6	−1	40.00
UEFA Europa Conference League	19 August 2021	9 December 2021	Play-off round	Group stage	8	3	1	4	14	12	+2	37.50
Total					54	29	7	18	94	61	+33	53.70

Source: Soccerway

=== Premier League ===
==== League table ====
Pos	Team	Pld	W	D	L	GF	GA	GD	Pts	Qualification or relegation
2	Liverpool	38	28	8	2	94	26	+68	92	Qualification for the Champions League group stage
3	Chelsea	38	21	11	6	76	33	+43	74	Qualification for the Champions League group stage
4	Tottenham Hotspur	38	22	5	11	69	40	+29	71	Qualification for the Champions League group stage
5	Arsenal	38	22	3	13	61	48	+13	69	Qualification for the Europa League group stage (Note: Since the winners of the 2021–22 FA Cup and the 2021–22 EFL Cup, Liverpool, qualified for the Champions League, the spot given to the FA Cup winners (Europa League group stage) was passed to the sixth-placed team and the spot given to the League Cup winners (Europa Conference League play-off round) was passed to the seventh-placed team.)
6	Manchester United	38	16	10	12	57	57	0	58	Qualification for the Europa League group stage

Source: Premier League
Rules for classification: 1) Points; 2) Goal difference; 3) Goals scored; 4) If the champions, relegated teams or qualified teams for UEFA competitions cannot be determined by rules 1 to 3, rules 4.1 to 4.3 are applied – 4.1) Points gained in head-to-head record between such teams; 4.2) Away goals scored in head-to-head record between such teams; 4.3) Play-offs

==== Results summary ====
Overall								Home						Away					
Pld	W	D	L	GF	GA	GD	Pts	W	D	L	GF	GA	GD	W	D	L	GF	GA	GD
38	22	5	11	69	40	+29	71	13	1	5	38	19	+19	9	4	6	31	21	+10

Source: Premier League

==== Results by matchday ====
Matchday	1	2	3	4	5	6	7	8	9	10	11	12	13	14	15	16	17	18	19	20	21	22	23	24	25	26	27	28	29	30	31	32	33	34	35	36	37	38
Ground	H	A	H	A	H	A	H	A	A	H	A	H	H	H	H	H	A	A	A	A	H	H	A	A	A	H	A	A	H	H	A	H	A	H	A	H	H	A
Result	W	W	W	L	L	L	W	W	L	L	D	W	W	W	D	W	D	W	W	L	L	L	W	L	W	W	L	W	W	W	W	L	D	W	D	W	W	W
Position	10	5	1	7	7	11	8	5	6	9	9	7	6	5	7	7	5	7	6	5	7	7	8	8	8	7	7	7	5	4	4	4	5	5	5	5	4	4

A = Away; H = Home; W = Win; D = Draw; L = Loss

==== Matches ====
The league fixtures were announced on 16 June 2021.

15 August 2021 1	Tottenham Hotspur	1–0	Manchester City	Tottenham
16:30 BST	Son 55'; Lucas Moura (yellow card) 66'; Sánchez (yellow card) 90+1'	Report	Grealish (yellow card) 90+1'	Stadium: Tottenham Hotspur Stadium; Attendance: 58,262; Referee: Anthony Taylor

22 August 2021 2	Wolverhampton Wanderers	0–1	Tottenham Hotspur	Wolverhampton
14:00 BST	Jiménez (yellow card) 57'	Report	Alli 10' (pen.); Tanganga (yellow card) 38'; Skipp (yellow card) 44'; Højbjerg (yellow card) 85'; Kane (yellow card) 90+1'	Stadium: Molineux Stadium; Attendance: 30,368; Referee: Stuart Attwell

29 August 2021 3	Tottenham Hotspur	1–0	Watford	Tottenham
14:00 BST	Son 42'; Kane (yellow card) 45+1'; Alli (yellow card) 61'; Skipp (yellow card) 85'	Report	Etebo (yellow card) 29'; Sissoko (yellow card) 54'; Dennis (yellow card) 90+4'	Stadium: Tottenham Hotspur Stadium; Attendance: 57,672; Referee: Andre Marriner

11 September 2021 4	Crystal Palace	3–0	Tottenham Hotspur	Selhurst
12:30 BST	Zaha (yellow card) 53', (goal) 76' (pen.); Édouard 84', 90+2'; Gallagher (yellow card) 89'	Report	Tanganga (yellow card) 53' (yellow-red card) 58'; Lucas Moura (yellow card) 81'	Stadium: Selhurst Park; Attendance: 22,740; Referee: Jonathan Moss

19 September 2021 5	Tottenham Hotspur	0–3	Chelsea	Tottenham
16:30 BST		Report	Thiago Silva 49'; Kanté 57'; Werner (yellow card) 80'; Rüdiger 90+2'	Stadium: Tottenham Hotspur Stadium; Attendance: 60,059; Referee: Paul Tierney

26 September 2021 6	Arsenal	3–1	Tottenham Hotspur	Holloway
16:30 BST	Smith Rowe 12'; Aubameyang 27'; Saka 34'; Ødegaard (yellow card) 89'; Lokonga (yellow card) 90+1'	Report	Skipp (yellow card) 67'; Son 79'	Stadium: Emirates Stadium; Attendance: 59,919; Referee: Craig Pawson

3 October 2021 7	Tottenham Hotspur	2–1	Aston Villa	Tottenham
14:00 BST	Højbjerg 27'; Skipp (yellow card) 36'; Romero (yellow card) 68'; Targett 71' (o.g.)	Report	J. Ramsey (yellow card) 31'; Watkins 67'	Stadium: Tottenham Hotspur Stadium; Attendance: 53,076; Referee: Chris Kavanagh

17 October 2021 8	Newcastle United	2–3	Tottenham Hotspur	Newcastle upon Tyne
16:30 BST	Wilson 2'; Longstaff (yellow card) 34'; Clark (yellow card) 54'; Hayden (yellow card) 68'; Shelvey (yellow card) 78' (yellow-red card) 83'; Dier 89' (o.g.); Joelinton (yellow card) 90+4'	Report	Ndombele 17'; Kane 22'; Son 45+3'; Emerson (yellow card) 64'	Stadium: St James' Park; Attendance: 52,214; Referee: Andre Marriner

24 October 2021 9	West Ham United	1–0	Tottenham Hotspur	Stratford
14:00 BST	Souček (yellow card) 21'; Ogbonna (yellow card) 37'; Antonio 72'	Report	Romero (yellow card) 60'	Stadium: London Stadium; Attendance: 59,924; Referee: Paul Tierney

30 October 2021 10	Tottenham Hotspur	0–3	Manchester United	Tottenham
17:30 BST	Davies (yellow card) 78'; Romero (yellow card) 90+2'	Report	Shaw (yellow card) 19'; Maguire (yellow card) 22'; Ronaldo 39'; Cavani 64'; Fred (yellow card) 73'; Rashford 86'	Stadium: Tottenham Hotspur Stadium; Attendance: 60,356; Referee: Stuart Attwell

7 November 2021 11	Everton	0–0	Tottenham Hotspur	Walton
14:00 GMT	Delph (yellow card) 26'; Richarlison (yellow card) 69'; Holgate (red card) 90+2'	Report	Reguilón (yellow card) 12'; Romero (yellow card) 69'; Ndombele (yellow card) 87'; Skipp (yellow card) 90+4'	Stadium: Goodison Park; Attendance: 39,059; Referee: Chris Kavanagh

21 November 2021 12	Tottenham Hotspur	2–1	Leeds United	Tottenham
16:30 GMT	Højbjerg 58'; Reguilón 69'; Emerson (yellow card) 90+1'	Report	Gelhardt (yellow card) 30'; James 44'; Forshaw (yellow card) 65'; Cooper (yellow card) 67'; Phillips (yellow card) 90+4'	Stadium: Tottenham Hotspur Stadium; Attendance: 58,989; Referee: Andre Marriner

2 December 2021 13	Tottenham Hotspur	2–0	Brentford	Tottenham
19:30 GMT	Canós 12' (o.g.); Son 65'	Report		Stadium: Tottenham Hotspur Stadium; Attendance: 54,202; Referee: Jonathan Moss

5 December 2021 14	Tottenham Hotspur	3–0	Norwich City	Tottenham
14:00 GMT	Lucas Moura 10'; Reguilón (yellow card) 16'; Sánchez 67'; Son 77'	Report	Pukki (yellow card) 14'; Gilmour (yellow card) 34'	Stadium: Tottenham Hotspur Stadium; Attendance: 57,088; Referee: Jarred Gillett

19 December 2021 15	Tottenham Hotspur	2–2	Liverpool	Tottenham
16:30 GMT	Kane 13' (yellow card) 20'; Emerson (yellow card) 28'; Winks (yellow card) 47'; Davies (yellow card) 58'; Son 74'	Report	Morton (yellow card) 23'; Jota 35'; Robertson 69', (red card) 77'; Keïta (yellow card) 84'; Konaté (yellow card) 85'; Tsimikas (yellow card) 90+5'	Stadium: Tottenham Hotspur Stadium; Attendance: 45,421; Referee: Paul Tierney

26 December 2021 16	Tottenham Hotspur	3–0	Crystal Palace	Tottenham
15:00 GMT	Kane 32'; Lucas Moura 34'; Sánchez (yellow card) 69'; Son 74'	Report	Zaha (yellow card) 26' (yellow-red card) 37'; Tomkins (yellow card) 45+2'	Stadium: Tottenham Hotspur Stadium; Attendance: 40,539; Referee: Jonathan Moss

28 December 2021 17	Southampton	1–1	Tottenham Hotspur	Southampton
15:00 GMT	Walker-Peters (yellow card) 13'; Ward-Prowse 25'; Salisu (yellow card) 27' (yellow-red card) 39'; Armstrong (yellow card) 51'	Report	Kane 41' (pen.); Reguilón (yellow card) 45+1'; Winks (yellow card) 69'	Stadium: St Mary's Stadium; Attendance: 31,304; Referee: Anthony Taylor

1 January 2022 18	Watford	0–1	Tottenham Hotspur	Watford
15:00 GMT		Report	Skipp (yellow card) 61'; Sánchez 90+6'	Stadium: Vicarage Road; Attendance: 20,391; Referee: Robert Jones

19 January 2022 19	Leicester City	2–3	Tottenham Hotspur	Leicester
19:30 GMT	Daka 24'; Choudhury (yellow card) 55'; Maddison 76'	Report	Kane 38'; Sánchez (yellow card) 59'; Bergwijn (yellow card) 90+4', (goal) 90+5', 90+7'	Stadium: King Power Stadium; Attendance: 31,986; Referee: Jonathan Moss
Note: The match was originally scheduled for 16 December 2021, but was postponed due to a COVID-19 outbreak in Leicester City's squad.

23 January 2022 20	Chelsea	2–0	Tottenham Hotspur	Fulham
16:30 GMT	Thiago Silva (yellow card) 24', (goal) 55'; Jorginho (yellow card) 42'; Ziyech 47'	Report	Tanganga (yellow card) 37'	Stadium: Stamford Bridge; Attendance: 40,020; Referee: Paul Tierney

9 February 2022 21	Tottenham Hotspur	2–3	Southampton	Tottenham
19:45 GMT	Bednarek 18' (o.g.); Sánchez (yellow card) 59'; Son 70'; Romero (yellow card) 90+4'	Report	Broja 23'; Perraud (yellow card) 76'; Romeu (yellow card) 77'; Elyounoussi 80'; Adams 82'; Forster (yellow card) 84'	Stadium: Tottenham Hotspur Stadium; Attendance: 54,012; Referee: David Coote

13 February 2022 22	Tottenham Hotspur	0–2	Wolverhampton Wanderers	Tottenham
14:00 GMT	Lucas Moura (yellow card) 68'; Kulusevski (yellow card) 71'; Bentancur (yellow card) 90+4'	Report	Jiménez 7'; Dendoncker 18'; Aït-Nouri (yellow card) 66'	Stadium: Tottenham Hotspur Stadium; Attendance: 56,452; Referee: Kevin Friend

19 February 2022 23	Manchester City	2–3	Tottenham Hotspur	Manchester
17:30 GMT	Gündoğan 33'; Mahrez 90+2' (pen.)	Report	Kulusevski 4'; Kane 59', 90+5'; Højbjerg (yellow card) 64'; Romero (yellow card) 77'; Lloris (yellow card) 80'	Stadium: Etihad Stadium; Attendance: 53,201; Referee: Anthony Taylor

23 February 2022 24	Burnley	1–0	Tottenham Hotspur	Burnley
19:30 GMT	Mee 71'	Report		Stadium: Turf Moor; Attendance: 19,488; Referee: Peter Bankes
Note: The original match to be played on 28 November 2021 was postponed due to heavy snow.

26 February 2022 25	Leeds United	0–4	Tottenham Hotspur	Leeds
12:30 GMT	Klich (yellow card) 52'; Dallas (yellow card) 53'; Firpo (yellow card) 54'; Rodrigo (yellow card) 77'	Report	Doherty 10'; Kulusevski 15'; Kane 27'; Sessegnon (yellow card) 48'; Son 85'; Davies (yellow card) 89'	Stadium: Elland Road; Attendance: 36,599; Referee: Craig Pawson

7 March 2022 26	Tottenham Hotspur	5–0	Everton	Tottenham
20:00 GMT	Keane 14' (o.g.); Son 17', (yellow card) 24'; Romero (yellow card) 30'; Kane 37', 56'; Reguilón 46'	Report		Stadium: Tottenham Hotspur Stadium; Attendance: 59,647; Referee: Stuart Attwell

12 March 2022 27	Manchester United	3–2	Tottenham Hotspur	Trafford
17:30 GMT	Ronaldo 12', 38', 81'; Fred (yellow card) 35'; Pogba (yellow card) 85'	Report	Dier (yellow card) 30'; Kane 35' (pen.); Maguire 72' (o.g.)	Stadium: Old Trafford; Attendance: 73,458; Referee: Jonathan Moss

16 March 2022 28	Brighton & Hove Albion	0–2	Tottenham Hotspur	Falmer
19:30 GMT	Maupay (yellow card) 7'; Veltman (yellow card) 45+1'	Report	Romero 37', (yellow card) 54'; Reguilón (yellow card) 43'; Kane 57'	Stadium: Falmer Stadium; Attendance: 31,144; Referee: Robert Jones
Note: The match was postponed due to a COVID-19 outbreak in Tottenham's squad.

20 March 2022 29	Tottenham Hotspur	3–1	West Ham United	Tottenham
16:30 GMT	Zouma 9' (o.g.); Son 24', 88'	Report	Dawson (yellow card) 23'; Benrahma 35'	Stadium: Tottenham Hotspur Stadium; Attendance: 58,685; Referee: Anthony Taylor

3 April 2022 30	Tottenham Hotspur	5–1	Newcastle United	Tottenham
16:30 BST	Kane (yellow card) 26'; Davies 43'; Bentancur (yellow card) 45+3'; Doherty 48'; Son 54'; Emerson 63'; Bergwijn 83'	Report	Schär 39'; Saint-Maximin (yellow card) 45+3'; Joelinton (yellow card) 45+3'; Burn (yellow card) 46'	Stadium: Tottenham Hotspur Stadium; Attendance: 57,553; Referee: Martin Atkinson

9 April 2022 31	Aston Villa	0–4	Tottenham Hotspur	Birmingham
17:30 BST	Ings (yellow card) 21'; Young (yellow card) 82'	Report	Son 3', 66', 71'; Højbjerg (yellow card) 29'; Kulusevski 50'; Emerson (yellow card) 74'; Kane (yellow card) 90+1'	Stadium: Villa Park; Attendance: 41,949; Referee: Graham Scott

16 April 2022 32	Tottenham Hotspur	0–1	Brighton & Hove Albion	Tottenham
12:30 BST	Kulusevski (yellow card) 27'; Bentancur (yellow card) 34'; Emerson (yellow card) 90+4'	Report	Mwepu (yellow card) 26'; Bissouma (yellow card) 58'; Trossard 90'; Dunk (yellow card) 90+5'	Stadium: Tottenham Hotspur Stadium; Attendance: 58,685; Referee: Craig Pawson

23 April 2022 33	Brentford	0–0	Tottenham Hotspur	Brentford
17:30 BST	Jansson (yellow card) 66'; Sørensen (yellow card) 89'	Report	Bentancur (yellow card) 90'	Stadium: Brentford Community Stadium; Attendance: 17,072; Referee: Martin Atkinson

1 May 2022 34	Tottenham Hotspur	3–1	Leicester City	Tottenham
14:00 BST	Kane 22'; Davies (yellow card) 26'; Bentancur (yellow card) 58'; Son 60', 79'	Report	Albrighton (yellow card) 48'; Amartey (yellow card) 63'; Thomas (yellow card) 66'; Iheanacho 90+1'	Stadium: Tottenham Hotspur Stadium; Attendance: 59,482; Referee: Jonathan Moss

7 May 2022 35	Liverpool	1–1	Tottenham Hotspur	Liverpool
19:45 BST	Tsimikas (yellow card) 69'; Díaz 74'; Fabinho (yellow card) 80'; Keïta (yellow card) 90+3'	Report	Davies (yellow card) 54'; Son 56'; Sessegnon (yellow card) 70'	Stadium: Anfield; Attendance: 53,177; Referee: Michael Oliver

12 May 2022 36	Tottenham Hotspur	3–0	Arsenal	Tottenham
19:45 BST	Davies (yellow card) 17'; Kane 22' (pen.), 37'; Son 47'	Report	Holding (yellow card) 26' (yellow-red card) 33'; Smith Rowe (yellow card) 86'; Ødegaard (yellow card) 88'; Xhaka (yellow card) 90+1'	Stadium: Tottenham Hotspur Stadium; Attendance: 62,027; Referee: Paul Tierney
Note: The match, originally scheduled for 16 January, was postponed due to an insufficient amount of available players in the Arsenal squad as a result of COVID-19, existing and recent injuries, and players away with their countries at the 2021 Africa Cup of Nations.

15 May 2022 37	Tottenham Hotspur	1–0	Burnley	Tottenham
12:00 BST	Kane 45+8' (pen.); Lucas Moura (yellow card) 49'; Lloris (yellow card) 86'; Kulusevski (yellow card) 90+4'	Report	Roberts (yellow card) 27'; Pope (yellow card) 45+8'	Stadium: Tottenham Hotspur Stadium; Attendance: 61,729; Referee: Kevin Friend

22 May 2022 38	Norwich City	0–5	Tottenham Hotspur	Norwich
16:00 BST	Byram (yellow card) 15'; Normann (yellow card) 31'; Springett (yellow card) 74'	Report	Kulusevski 16', 64'; Kane 32'; Son 70', 75', (yellow card) 85'	Stadium: Carrow Road; Attendance: 27,022; Referee: Chris Kavanagh

=== FA Cup ===
Tottenham were drawn home to Morecambe in the third round and Brighton & Hove Albion in the fourth round, and were drawn away to Middlesbrough in the fifth round.

9 January 2022 Third round	Tottenham Hotspur	3–1	Morecambe	Tottenham
14:00 GMT	Winks 74'; Lucas Moura 85'; Kane 88'	Report	O'Connor 33'; Diagouraga (yellow card) 44'; Cooney (yellow card) 74'	Stadium: Tottenham Hotspur Stadium; Attendance: 40,310; Referee: John Brooks

5 February 2022 Fourth round	Tottenham Hotspur	3–1	Brighton & Hove Albion	Tottenham
20:00 GMT	Kane 13', 66'; March 24' (o.g.); Bentancur (yellow card) 86'	Report	Veltman (yellow card) 57'; Bissouma 63'	Stadium: Tottenham Hotspur Stadium; Attendance: 54,697; Referee: Stuart Attwell

1 March 2022 Fifth round	Middlesbrough	1–0 (a.e.t.)	Tottenham Hotspur	Middlesbrough
19:55 GMT	McNair (yellow card) 57'; Coburn 107'	Report	Romero (yellow card) 58'	Stadium: Riverside Stadium; Attendance: 31,135; Referee: Darren England

=== EFL Cup ===
Tottenham entered the competition in the third round as one of the teams competing in UEFA competitions. They were drawn away to Wolverhampton Wanderers in the third round and Burnley in the fourth round. They were drawn home to West Ham United in the quarter-finals. They were drawn to Chelsea in the semi-finals, with the first leg away and the second leg home.

22 September 2021 Third round	Wolverhampton Wanderers	2–2 (2–3 p)	Tottenham Hotspur	Wolverhampton
19:45 BST	Silva (yellow card) 16'; Dendoncker 38'; Neves (yellow card) 47'; Podence 58'	Report	Ndombele 14', (yellow card) 83'; Kane 23'	Stadium: Molineux; Attendance: 28,798; Referee: Peter Bankes
	Penalties
	Hwang (penalty scored); Moutinho (penalty scored); Neves (penalty missed); Dendoncker (penalty missed); Coady (penalty missed)		(penalty scored) Kane; (penalty scored) Reguilón; (penalty scored) Gil; (penalty missed) Højbjerg

27 October 2021 Fourth round	Burnley	0–1	Tottenham Hotspur	Burnley
19:45 BST	Roberts (yellow card) 70'	Report	Lucas Moura 68'; Son (yellow card) 90+4'	Stadium: Turf Moor; Attendance: 14,637; Referee: Peter Bankes

22 December 2021 Quarter-finals	Tottenham Hotspur	2–1	West Ham United	Tottenham
19:45 GMT	Bergwijn 29'; Lucas Moura 34'	Report	Bowen 32', (yellow card) 37'	Stadium: Tottenham Hotspur Stadium; Attendance: 40,031; Referee: Chris Kavanagh

5 January 2022 Semi-finals; First leg	Chelsea	2–0	Tottenham Hotspur	Fulham
19:45 GMT	Havertz 5'; Davies 34' (o.g.); Sarr (yellow card) 62'	Report		Stadium: Stamford Bridge; Attendance: 37,868; Referee: Craig Pawson

12 January 2022 Semi-finals; Second leg	Tottenham Hotspur	0–1 (0–3 agg.)	Chelsea	Tottenham
19:45 GMT		Report	Rüdiger 18'	Stadium: Tottenham Hotspur Stadium; Attendance: 45,603; Referee: Andre Marriner

=== UEFA Europa Conference League ===
==== Play-off round ====
Tottenham were drawn against Paços de Ferreira in the play-off round, with the first leg away and the second leg home.

19 August 2021 First leg	Paços de Ferreira (Portugal)	1–0	(England) Tottenham Hotspur	Paços de Ferreira, Portugal
20:30 CEST	Ferreira (yellow card) 35'; Silva 45'; Antunes (yellow card) 66'; Delgado (yellow card) 74'	Report	Davies (yellow card) 31'; Gil (yellow card) 90'	Stadium: Estádio da Mata Real; Attendance: 2,284; Referee: Maurizio Mariani (Italy)

26 August 2021 Second leg	Tottenham Hotspur (England)	3–0 (3–1 agg.)	(Portugal) Paços de Ferreira	Tottenham
19:45 BST	Kane 9', 35'; Romero (yellow card) 30'; Gil (yellow card) 63'; Lo Celso 70'	Report	Denílson (yellow card) 41'; Antunes (yellow card) 50'; Pires (yellow card) 64'	Stadium: Tottenham Hotspur Stadium; Attendance: 30,215; Referee: Ruddy Buquet (France)

==== Group stage ====
The draw for the group stage was held on 27 August 2021 with the fixtures being released a day later.

Pos	Team	Pld	W	D	L	GF	GA	GD	Pts	Qualification	REN	VIT	TOT	MUR
1	(France) Rennes	6	4	2	0	13	7	+6	14	Advance to round of 16	—	3–3	2–2	1–0
2	(Netherlands) Vitesse	6	3	1	2	12	9	+3	10	Advance to knockout round play-offs	1–2	—	1–0	3–1
3	(England) Tottenham Hotspur	6	2	1	3	11	11	0	7		0–3 (Note: The Tottenham Hotspur v Rennes match was awarded as a 3–0 win to Rennes due to numerous positive COVID-19 tests in the Tottenham Hotspur squad.)	3–2	—	5–1
4	(Slovenia) Mura	6	1	0	5	5	14	−9	3		1–2	0–2	2–1	—

Source: UEFA
Rules for classification: Group stage tiebreakers
Notes:

16 September 2021 1	Rennes (France)	2–2	(England) Tottenham Hotspur	Rennes, France
18:45 CEST	Tait 23'; Laborde 72'; Martin (yellow card) 90+4'	Report	Badé 11' (o.g.); Højbjerg 76'; Gil (yellow card) 82'	Stadium: Roazhon Park; Attendance: 22,000; Referee: Halis Özkahya (Turkey)

30 September 2021 2	Tottenham Hotspur (England)	5–1	(Slovenia) Mura	Tottenham
20:00 BST	Alli 4' (pen.); Lo Celso 8'; Skipp (yellow card) 61'; Kane 68', 76', 88'	Report	Obradović (yellow card) 3'; Kous 53'; Maroša (yellow card) 74'	Stadium: Tottenham Hotspur Stadium; Attendance: 25,121; Referee: Yigal Frid (Israel)

21 October 2021 3	Vitesse (Netherlands)	1–0	(England) Tottenham Hotspur	Arnhem, Netherlands
18:45 CEST	Bero (yellow card) 13'; Wittek 78', (yellow card) 81'; Buitink (yellow card) 90'	Report	Bergwijn (yellow card) 41'; Sánchez (yellow card) 72'; Scarlett (yellow card) 74'; Winks (yellow card) 80'	Stadium: GelreDome; Attendance: 23,931; Referee: Harm Osmers (Germany)

4 November 2021 4	Tottenham Hotspur (England)	3–2	(Netherlands) Vitesse	Tottenham
20:00 GMT	Son 15'; Lucas Moura 22'; Rasmussen 28' (o.g.); Romero (yellow card) 37' (yellow-red card) 59'	Report	Rasmussen 32'; Bero 39'; Buitink (yellow card) 63'; Doekhi (yellow card) 76' (yellow-red card) 81'; Bazoer (yellow card) 80'; Schubert (red card) 85'	Stadium: Tottenham Hotspur Stadium; Attendance: 36,312; Referee: Marco Di Bello (Italy)

25 November 2021 5	Mura (Slovenia)	2–1	(England) Tottenham Hotspur	Maribor, Slovenia
18:45 CET	Horvat 11'; Gorenc (yellow card) 22'; Mulahusejnović (yellow card) 27'; Kozar (yellow card) 35'; Karamarko (yellow card) 53'; Šturm (yellow card) 65'; Lorbek (yellow card) 83'; Maroša (yellow card) 89', (goal) 90+5'	Report	Sessegnon (yellow card) 15' (yellow-red card) 32'; Alli (yellow card) 53'; Kane 72'	Stadium: Stadion Ljudski vrt Attendance: 6,100; Referee: António Nobre (Portugal)

9 December 2021 6	Tottenham Hotspur (England)	0–3 (awd.)	(France) Rennes	Tottenham
20:00 GMT		Report		Stadium: Tottenham Hotspur Stadium; Referee: Horațiu Feșnic (Romania)
Note: The match was voided due to a COVID-19 outbreak in Tottenham's squad. On 20 December 2021, UEFA awarded a 3–0 win to Rennes.

== Statistics ==
=== Appearances ===
Source: premierleague.com, uefa.com

No.	Pos	Name	Premier League		FA Cup		EFL Cup		Europa Conference League		Total	
No.	Pos	Name	Apps	Goals	Apps	Goals	Apps	Goals	Apps	Goals	Apps	Goals
Goalkeepers
1	GK	(France) Hugo Lloris	38	0	2	0	2	0	1	0	43	0
22	GK	(Italy) Pierluigi Gollini	0	0	1	0	3	0	6	0	10	0
Defenders
2	DF	(Republic of Ireland) Matt Doherty	9+6	2	2+1	0	3	0	5	0	19+7	2
3	DF	(Spain) Sergio Reguilón	22+3	2	1+1	0	1+1	0	2	0	26+5	2
4	DF	(Argentina) Cristian Romero	21+1	1	2	0	2	0	4	0	29+1	1
6	DF	(Colombia) Davinson Sánchez	17+6	2	1	0	5	0	2+1	0	25+7	2
12	DF	(Brazil) Emerson Royal	26+5	1	1+2	0	3+1	0	1+2	0	31+10	1
14	DF	(Wales) Joe Rodon	0+3	0	1+1	0	0+1	0	4	0	5+5	0
15	DF	(England) Eric Dier	35	0	1	0	1	0	2+1	0	39+1	0
19	DF	(England) Ryan Sessegnon	13+2	0	2	0	0+1	0	3	0	18+3	0
25	DF	(England) Japhet Tanganga	10+1	0	1	0	3+1	0	3	0	17+2	0
33	DF	(Wales) Ben Davies	28+1	1	3	0	5	0	5+1	0	41+2	1
38	DF	(United States) Cameron Carter-Vickers	0	0	0	0	0	0	1	0	1	0
48	DF	(Estonia) Maksim Paskotši	0	0	0	0	0	0	0+1	0	0+1	0
Midfielders
5	MF	(Denmark) Pierre-Emile Højbjerg	36	2	2	0	4+1	0	1+4	1	43+5	3
8	MF	(England) Harry Winks	9+10	0	3	1	1+2	0	4+1	0	17+13	1
18	MF	(Argentina) Giovani Lo Celso	2+7	0	1	0	3+1	0	4+1	2	10+9	2
28	MF	(France) Tanguy Ndombele	6+3	1	1	0	1+2	1	2+1	0	10+6	2
29	MF	(England) Oliver Skipp	14+4	0	0+1	0	4+1	0	4	0	22+6	0
30	MF	(Uruguay) Rodrigo Bentancur	16+1	0	0+1	0	0	0	0	0	16+2	0
43	MF	(England) Nile John	0	0	0	0	0	0	1	0	1	0
56	MF	(England) J'Neil Bennett	0	0	0	0	0	0	0+1	0	0+1	0
Forwards
7	FW	(South Korea) Son Heung-Min	35	23	2	0	1+3	0	1+3	1	38+6	24
10	FW	(England) Harry Kane	36+1	17	2+1	3	5	1	4+1	6	47+3	27
11	FW	(Spain) Bryan Gil	0+9	0	1	0	2+2	0	6	0	9+11	0
21	FW	(Sweden) Dejan Kulusevski	14+4	5	1+1	0	0	0	0	0	15+5	5
23	FW	(Netherlands) Steven Bergwijn	4+21	3	0+2	0	2	1	2+1	0	8+24	4
27	FW	(Brazil) Lucas Moura	19+14	2	1+1	1	3+1	2	3+2	1	26+18	6
44	FW	(England) Dane Scarlett	0+1	0	0+2	0	0	0	3+1	0	3+4	0
47	FW	(England) Jack Clarke	0	0	0	0	0	0	0+1	0	0+1	0
Players transferred out during the season
20	MF	(England) Dele Alli	8+2	1	1	0	1+1	0	3+2	1	13+5	2
54	MF	(England) Dilan Markanday	0	0	0	0	0	0	0+1	0	0+1	0

=== Goalscorers ===
The list is sorted by shirt number when total goals are equal.

Rnk	Pos	No.	Player	Premier League	FA Cup	EFL Cup	Europa Conference League	Total
1	FW	10	(England) Harry Kane	17	3	1	6	27
2	FW	7	(South Korea) Son Heung-Min	23	0	0	1	24
3	FW	27	(Brazil) Lucas Moura	2	1	2	1	6
4	FW	21	(Sweden) Dejan Kulusevski	5	0	0	0	5
5	FW	23	(Netherlands) Steven Bergwijn	3	0	1	0	4
6	MF	5	(Denmark) Pierre-Emile Højbjerg	2	0	0	1	3
7	DF	2	(Republic of Ireland) Matt Doherty	2	0	0	0	2
7	DF	3	(Spain) Sergio Reguilón	2	0	0	0	2
7	DF	6	(Colombia) Davinson Sánchez	2	0	0	0	2
7	MF	18	(Argentina) Giovani Lo Celso	0	0	0	2	2
7	MF	20	(England) Dele Alli	1	0	0	1	2
7	MF	28	(France) Tanguy Ndombele	1	0	1	0	2
13	DF	4	(Argentina) Cristian Romero	1	0	0	0	1
13	MF	8	(England) Harry Winks	0	1	0	0	1
13	DF	12	(Brazil) Emerson Royal	1	0	0	0	1
13	DF	33	(Wales) Ben Davies	1	0	0	0	1
Total				63	5	5	12	85

Source: premierleague.com

==== Hat-tricks ====
Score	The score is at the time of the goals. Tottenham's score is listed first.		
(H)	Tottenham was the home team.	(A)	Tottenham was the away team.

Player	Against	Competition	Minutes	Score after goals	Result	Date
(England) Harry Kane	(Slovenia) Mura	Europa Conference League	68', 76', 88'	3–1, 4–1, 5–1	5–1 (H)	30 September 2021
(South Korea) Heung-Min Son	(England) Aston Villa	Premier League	3', 66', 71'	1–0, 3–0, 4–0	4–0 (A)	9 April 2022

==== Own goals ====
Score	The score is at the time of the own goal. Tottenham's score is listed first.		
(H)	Tottenham was the home team.	(A)	Tottenham was the away team.

Player	Against	Competition	Minute	Score after own goal	Result	Date
(England) Eric Dier	(England) Newcastle United	Premier League	89'	3–2	3–2 (A)	17 October 2021
(Wales) Ben Davies	(England) Chelsea	EFL Cup	34'	0–2	0–2 (A)	5 January 2022

=== Disciplinary ===
The list is sorted by shirt number when total cards are equal.

Rnk	Pos	No.	Name	Premier League			FA Cup			EFL Cup			Europa Conference League			Total		
Rnk	Pos	No.	Name	Yellow card	Second yellow card	Red card	Yellow card	Second yellow card	Red card	Yellow card	Second yellow card	Red card	Yellow card	Second yellow card	Red card	Yellow card	Second yellow card	Red card
1	DF	4	(Argentina) Cristian Romero	8	0	0	1	0	0	0	0	0	1	1	0	10	1	0
2	MF	29	(England) Oliver Skipp	6	0	0	0	0	0	0	0	0	1	0	0	7	0	0
2	DF	33	(Wales) Ben Davies	6	0	0	0	0	0	0	0	0	1	0	0	7	0	0
4	MF	30	(Uruguay) Rodrigo Bentancur	5	0	0	1	0	0	0	0	0	0	0	0	6	0	0
5	DF	6	(Colombia) Davinson Sánchez	4	0	0	0	0	0	0	0	0	1	0	0	5	0	0
5	FW	10	(England) Harry Kane	5	0	0	0	0	0	0	0	0	0	0	0	5	0	0
5	DF	12	(Brazil) Emerson Royal	5	0	0	0	0	0	0	0	0	0	0	0	5	0	0
5	DF	19	(England) Ryan Sessegnon	2	0	0	0	0	0	0	0	0	1	1	0	3	1	0
9	DF	3	(Spain) Sergio Reguilón	4	0	0	0	0	0	0	0	0	0	0	0	4	0	0
9	DF	25	(England) Japhet Tanganga	2	1	0	0	0	0	0	0	0	0	0	0	2	1	0
9	FW	27	(Brazil) Lucas Moura	4	0	0	0	0	0	0	0	0	0	0	0	4	0	0
12	MF	5	(Denmark) Pierre-Emile Højbjerg	3	0	0	0	0	0	0	0	0	0	0	0	3	0	0
12	FW	7	(South Korea) Son Heung-Min	2	0	0	0	0	0	1	0	0	0	0	0	3	0	0
12	MF	8	(England) Harry Winks	2	0	0	0	0	0	0	0	0	1	0	0	3	0	0
12	FW	11	(Spain) Bryan Gil	0	0	0	0	0	0	0	0	0	3	0	0	3	0	0
12	FW	21	(Sweden) Dejan Kulusevski	3	0	0	0	0	0	0	0	0	0	0	0	3	0	0
17	GK	1	(France) Hugo Lloris	2	0	0	0	0	0	0	0	0	0	0	0	2	0	0
17	MF	20	(England) Dele Alli	1	0	0	0	0	0	0	0	0	1	0	0	2	0	0
17	FW	23	(Netherlands) Steven Bergwijn	1	0	0	0	0	0	0	0	0	1	0	0	2	0	0
17	MF	28	(France) Tanguy Ndombele	1	0	0	0	0	0	1	0	0	0	0	0	2	0	0
21	DF	15	(England) Eric Dier	1	0	0	0	0	0	0	0	0	0	0	0	1	0	0
21	FW	44	(England) Dane Scarlett	0	0	0	0	0	0	0	0	0	1	0	0	1	0	0
Total				67	1	0	2	0	0	2	0	0	12	2	0	82	3	0

=== Clean sheets ===
The list is sorted by shirt number when total clean sheets are equal.

Rnk	No.	Player	Premier League	FA Cup	EFL Cup	Europa Conference League	Total
1	1	(France) Hugo Lloris	16	0	0	0	16
2	22	(Italy) Pierluigi Gollini	0	0	1	1	2
Total			16	0	1	1	18

Source: premierleague.com

== See also ==
- 2021–22 in English football
- List of Tottenham Hotspur F.C. seasons
