= 2021–22 Crewe Alexandra F.C. season =

Crewe Alexandra
2021–22 season
- Chairman: Charles Grant
- Manager: David Artell (until 11 April); Alex Morris (from 11 April)
- Stadium: Mornflake Stadium
- League One: 24th (relegated)
- FA Cup: First round
- EFL Cup: Second round
- EFL Trophy: Third round
Home colours	Away colours

The 2021–22 season was Crewe Alexandra's 145th year in their history, their 98th in the Football League and second consecutive season in League One. Along with the league, the club also competed in the FA Cup, the EFL Cup and the EFL Trophy. The season covered the period from 1 July 2021 to 30 June 2022. Crewe's relegation to League Two was confirmed following a 2–0 defeat at Doncaster on 9 April 2022.

== Pre-season friendlies ==
Crewe Alexandra announced they would play friendlies against Nantwich Town, Witton Albion, Ashton United, Wolverhampton Wanderers, Stoke City, Kidsgrove Athletic, Nottingham Forest, Oldham Athletic, Wolverhampton Wanderers U23s and Huddersfield Town as part of their pre-season preparations.

The scheduled friendly against Huddersfield Town was later cancelled due to Town's involvement in the EFL Cup.

11 July 2021 Friendly	Nantwich Town	1–4	Crewe Alexandra	Nantwich
12:00 BST	Hatton 64'	Report	Onyeka 21'; Griffiths 30'; Robbins 65'; Lundstram 89'	Stadium: Optimum Pay Stadium

14 July 2021 Friendly	Witton Albion	0–6	Crewe Alexandra	Wincham
19:45 BST		Report	Dale 15', 53'; Long 21'; Mandron 26' (pen.), 88'; Finney 40'	Stadium: Wincham Park

14 July 2021 Friendly	Ashton United	1–5	Crewe Alexandra	Ashton-under-Lyne
19:45 BST		Report	Robbins x3 Porter; Ainley	Stadium: Hurst Cross

17 July 2021 Friendly	Crewe Alexandra	1–0	Wolverhampton Wanderers	Crewe
15:00 BST	Long 53'	Report		Stadium: Mornflake Stadium

20 July 2021 Ashton Hulme Charity Match	Crewe Alexandra	2–3	Stoke City	Crewe
19:00 BST	Lundstram 58'; Dale 70'	Report	Batth 1'; Fletcher 27'; Powell 44'	Stadium: Mornflake Stadium

21 July 2021 Friendly	Kidsgrove Athletic	1–1	Crewe Alexandra	Kidsgrove
19:30 BST	Trialist 53'	Report	Onyeka 78'	Stadium: Hollinwood Road

24 July 2021 Friendly	Crewe Alexandra	2–2	Nottingham Forest	Crewe
15:00 BST	Ainley 75'; Adebisi 79'	Report	Johnson 30', 56'	Stadium: Mornflake Stadium

27 July 2021 Friendly	Oldham Athletic	2–1	Crewe Alexandra	Oldham
19:00 BST	Hart 11', 26'	Report	Kirk 20'	Stadium: Boundary Park

28 July 2021 Friendly	Wolverhampton Wanderers U23s	v	Crewe Alexandra	TBC
14:00 BST

31 July 2021 Friendly	Huddersfield Town	C–C	Crewe Alexandra	Huddersfield
12:30 BST				Stadium: The John Smith's Stadium; Attendance: 0 (Behind-closed-doors)
Note: Cancelled due to Huddersfield's EFL Cup involvement

== Competitions ==
=== League One ===
==== League table ====
Pos	Team	Pld	W	D	L	GF	GA	GD	Pts	Promotion, qualification or relegation
17	Lincoln City	46	14	10	22	55	63	−8	52	
18	Shrewsbury Town	46	12	14	20	47	51	−4	50	
19	Morecambe	46	10	12	24	57	88	−31	42	
20	Fleetwood Town	46	8	16	22	62	82	−20	40	
21	Gillingham (R)	46	8	16	22	35	69	−34	40	Relegation to EFL League Two
22	Doncaster Rovers (R)	46	10	8	28	37	82	−45	38	Relegation to EFL League Two
23	AFC Wimbledon (R)	46	6	19	21	49	75	−26	37	Relegation to EFL League Two
24	Crewe Alexandra (R)	46	7	8	31	37	83	−46	29	Relegation to EFL League Two

Source: EFL Official Website
Rules for classification: 1) Points; 2) Goal difference; 3) Number of goals scored; 4) Head-to-head results; 5) Wins; 6) Away goals; 7) Penalty points based on yellow and red cards received excluding the last four games of the season (sec 9.5); 8) 12-point sending off offences; 9) If the tie affects the automatic promotion or relegation places, a play-off game or games would be held between the two tied teams
(R) Relegated

==== Results summary ====
Overall								Home						Away					
Pld	W	D	L	GF	GA	GD	Pts	W	D	L	GF	GA	GD	W	D	L	GF	GA	GD
46	7	8	31	37	83	−46	29	5	5	13	22	40	−18	2	3	18	15	43	−28

Last updated: 23 April 2022.

==== Results by matchday ====
Matchday	1	2	3	4	5	6	7	8	9	10	11	12	13	14	15	16	17	18	19	20	21	22	23	24	25	26	27	28	29	30	31	32	33	34	35	36	37	38	39	40	41	42	43	44	45	46
Ground	H	A	A	H	A	A	H	H	A	H	H	A	H	A	H	H	A	H	A	A	H	H	A	A	H	H	A	H	A	H	A	A	H	A	H	H	A	H	H	H	A	A	H	A	H	A
Result	D	L	L	L	L	D	W	L	D	D	D	L	L	L	L	D	L	W	L	L	W	L	W	L	W	D	L	L	L	L	L	L	L	W	L	L	L	L	L	L	L	L	W	L	D	L
Position	13	21	21	22	23	23	21	22	23	22	22	23	23	24	24	24	24	24	24	24	23	24	22	23	22	22	22	22	22	23	23	24	24	24	24	24	24	24	24	24	24	24	24	24	24	24

Updated to match(es) played on 23 April 2022. Source: Statto.com
A = Away; H = Home; W = Win; D = Draw; L = Loss

==== Matches ====
Crewe's fixtures were announced on 24 June 2021.

7 August 2021 1	Crewe Alexandra	1–1	Cheltenham Town	Crewe
15:00 BST	Mandron 28'; Ramsay (yellow card) 65'	Report	Williams 40', (yellow card) 45+1'	Stadium: Mornflake Stadium; Attendance: 5,301; Referee: Ben Toner

14 August 2021 2	Portsmouth	2–0	Crewe Alexandra	Milton
15:00 BST	Marquis 48'; Harness 64'	Report	Long (yellow card) 71'	Stadium: Fratton Park; Attendance: 11,470; Referee: Will Finnie

17 August 2021 3	Oxford United	1–0	Crewe Alexandra	Oxford
19:45 BST	Henry 33' (pen.), (yellow card) 90+1'; Rodríguez (yellow card) 51'	Report	Offord (yellow card) 79'; Lundstram (yellow card) 82'; Griffiths (yellow card) 90+5'	Stadium: The Kassam Stadium; Attendance: 6,757; Referee: Bobby Madley

21 August 2021 4	Crewe Alexandra	0–1	Accrington Stanley	Crewe
15:00 BST	Offord (yellow card) 55' (yellow-red card) 89'; Murphy (yellow card) 56'; Ramsay (yellow card) 78'; Finney (yellow card) 86'	Report	Nottingham 17'; Sykes (yellow card) 38'; Pell (yellow card) 50'; Trafford (yellow card) 62'; Charles (yellow card) 68'; Bishop (yellow card) 90+7'; Mumbongo (yellow card) 90+7'	Stadium: Mornflake Stadium; Attendance: 4,187; Referee: Darren Drysdale

28 August 2021 5	Charlton Athletic	2–0	Crewe Alexandra	Charlton
15:00 BST	Jaiyesimi 36'; Gunter (yellow card) 40'; Stockley 41'	Report	McFadzean (yellow card) 61'; Adebisi (yellow card) 71'	Stadium: The Valley; Attendance: 13,167; Referee: James Bell

11 September 2021 6	Shrewsbury Town	1–1	Crewe Alexandra	Shrewsbury
15:00 BST	Cosgrove 19'; Pennington (yellow card) 35'; Ebanks-Landell (yellow card) 57'; Pierre (yellow card) 67'; Udoh (yellow card) 90+7'	Report	Adebisi (yellow card) 3'; Murphy (yellow card) 36'; Mandron 44'; Robertson (yellow card) 71'; Ramsay (yellow card) 87'; Daniels (yellow card) 90+9'	Stadium: Montgomery Waters Meadow; Attendance: 5,867; Referee: Sam Barrott

18 September 2021 7	Crewe Alexandra	2–0	Burton Albion	Crewe
15:00 BST	Bostwick 10' (o.g.); Murphy (yellow card) 54'; Bennett 87'	Report	Lakin (yellow card) 3' (yellow-red card) 67'; Borthwick-Jackson (yellow card) 31'; Hemmings (yellow card) 42'	Stadium: Mornflake Stadium; Referee: Ross Joyce

21 September 2021 8	Crewe Alexandra	1–3	Morecambe	Crewe
19:45 BST	Mandron 49'	Report	Phillips 8'; Gnahoua 28', 85'; Cooney (yellow card) 40'; McLoughlin (yellow card) 79'; Stockton (yellow card) 80'	Stadium: Mornflake Stadium; Attendance: 3,542; Referee: Paul Howard

25 September 2021 9	Rotherham United	1–1	Crewe Alexandra	Rotherham
15:00 BST	Rathbone 54'; Harding (yellow card) 74' (yellow-red card) 90'; Smith (yellow card) 85'	Report	Jääskeläinen (yellow card) 44'; Porter 90+1' (pen.)	Stadium: AESSEAL New York Stadium; Attendance: 8,747; Referee: Sam Allison

28 September 2021 10	Plymouth Argyle	1–1	Crewe Alexandra	Plymouth
19:45 BST	Wilson (yellow card) 33'; Houghton (yellow card) 64'; Hardie 72'; Galloway (yellow card) 77'	Report	Kashket 3'; Johnson (yellow card) 62'; Offord (yellow card) 70'; Robertson (yellow card) 90'	Stadium: Home Park; Attendance: 11,138; Referee: Neil Hair

2 October 2021 11	Crewe Alexandra	2–2	Cambridge United	Crewe
15:00 BST	Finney 10'; Kashket (yellow card) 20'; Robertson 26'; Ramsay (yellow card) 89'	Report	Jääskeläinen 79' (o.g.); May 90+4'	Stadium: Alexandra Stadium; Attendance: 4,237; Referee: Carl Brook

16 October 2021 12	Fleetwood Town	3–0	Crewe Alexandra	Fleetwood
15:00 BST	Johnson 60'; Andrew (yellow card) 65', (goal) 72'; Batty (yellow card) 65'; Garner 90+6'	Report	McFadzean (yellow card) 65'; Robertson (yellow card) 65'; Finney (yellow card) 71'; Thomas (yellow card) 90+4'	Stadium: Highbury Stadium; Attendance: 2,917; Referee: Marc Edwards

19 October 2021 13	Crewe Alexandra	0–4	Sunderland	Crewe
19:45 GMT	Murphy (yellow card) 75'	Report	Thomas 25' (o.g.); Stewart 32', 55'; Winchester (yellow card) 51'; Cirkin (yellow card) 53'; Dajaku 73'	Stadium: Alexandra Stadium; Attendance: 5,618; Referee: Carl Boyeson

23 October 2021 14	Wycombe Wanderers	2–1	Crewe Alexandra	High Wycombe
15:00 BST	Tafazolli 45+1', 90+7'	Report	Adebisi (yellow card) 41'; McFadzean (yellow card) 45+1'; Offord (yellow card) 71'; Lowery 77'	Stadium: Adams Park; Attendance: 4,813; Referee: Steve Martin

30 October 2021 15	Crewe Alexandra	1–4	Milton Keynes Dons	Crewe
15:00 BST	Long 52'; Bennett (yellow card) 69'	Report	Eisa 12', (penalty missed) 68'; Twine (yellow card) 58'; O'Riley 64'; Daniels 82' (o.g.); Watters 90+6'	Stadium: Alexandra Stadium; Attendance: 4,512; Referee: Andy Haines

2 November 2021 16	Crewe Alexandra	1–1	Doncaster Rovers	Crewe
19:45 GMT	Porter 33'	Report	Galbraith (yellow card) 45+1'; Olowu 45+4'; Williams (yellow card) 56'; Anderson (yellow card) 74'; Smith (yellow card) 81'; Dahlberg (yellow card) 90+4'	Stadium: Alexandra Stadium; Attendance: 3,392; Referee: Simon Mather

12 November 2021 17	Bolton Wanderers	2–0	Crewe Alexandra	Bolton
20:00 GMT	Kachunga (yellow card) 2'; Sheehan 50' (pen.); Bakayoko 54'	Report	Mandron (yellow card) 10'; Long (yellow card) 28'; Gomes (yellow card) 35'; Offord (yellow card) 90+1'	Stadium: University of Bolton Stadium; Attendance: 13,804; Referee: James Bell

20 November 2021 18	Crewe Alexandra	2–0	Gillingham	Crewe
15:00 GMT	Long 11'; Offord (yellow card) 68'; Lowery 90+1'	Report	O'Keefe (yellow card) 47'; Phillips (yellow card) 61'	Stadium: Alexandra Stadium; Attendance: 4,047; Referee: Anthony Backhouse

23 November 2021 19	AFC Wimbledon	3–2	Crewe Alexandra	Wimbledon
19:45 GMT	Rudoni 24'; Palmer 35', 44' (pen.); Heneghan (yellow card) 81'; Assal (yellow card) 90+2' (yellow-red card) 90+4'	Report	Long 11'; Murphy (yellow card) 44'; Sass-Davies (yellow card) 79'; Porter 89'; Williams (yellow card) 90+4'	Stadium: Plough Lane; Referee: Craig Hicks

28 November 2021 20	Ipswich Town	2–1	Crewe Alexandra	Ipswich
15:00 GMT	Offord 3' (o.g.); Celina 45+5'; Clements (yellow card) 50'; Edmundson (yellow card) 88'	Report	Williams (yellow card) 48'; Long 73'	Stadium: Portman Road; Referee: James Oldham

7 December 2021 21	Crewe Alexandra	2–0	Lincoln City	Crewe
19:45 GMT	Griffiths (yellow card) 45+5'; Mandron 48' (pen.), 52' (pen.)	Report	Eyoma (yellow card) 37', (red card) 50'; Robson (yellow card) 45+3'	Stadium: Mornflake Stadium; Attendance: 3,285; Referee: Declan Bourne

11 December 2021 22	Crewe Alexandra	0–2	Sheffield Wednesday	Crewe
15:00 GMT	Robertson (yellow card) 16'; Porter (penalty missed) 45+2'	Report	Bannan 27', (yellow card) 28'; Corbeanu (yellow card) 39'; Gregory 47'	Stadium: Mornflake Stadium; Attendance: 6,325; Referee: Lee Swabey

29 December 2021 23	Morecambe	1–2	Crewe Alexandra	Morecambe
19:45 GMT	Leigh 36'	Report	Adebisi (yellow card) 42'; Porter 52'; Murphy 58' (yellow card) 59'	Stadium: Mazuma Stadium; Attendance: 3,831; Referee: Seb Stockbridge

1 January 2022 24	Burton Albion	4–1	Crewe Alexandra	Burton upon Trent
15:00 GMT	Chapman 6'; Brayford 25'; Hemmings 34'; Jebbison 90+2'	Report	Lowery 19'; Offord (yellow card) 75'; Finney (yellow card) 77'	Stadium: Pirelli Stadium; Attendance: 3,119; Referee: Peter Wright

12 January 2022 25	Crewe Alexandra	2–1	Charlton Athletic	Crewe
19:45 GMT	Finney 38'; Mandron 45+3'	Report	Burstow 80'	Stadium: Mornflake Stadium; Attendance: 3,556; Referee: Robert Lewis

15 January 2022 26	Crewe Alexandra	0–0	Shrewsbury Town	Crewe
15:00 GMT	Griffiths (yellow card) 23'; Sass-Davies (yellow card) 63'	Report		Stadium: Mornflake Stadium; Attendance: 5,587; Referee: Gavin Ward

22 January 2022 27	Cambridge United	1–0	Crewe Alexandra	Cambridge
15:00 GMT	Sherring (yellow card) 29'; May 42'; Iredale (yellow card) 58'; Hoolahan (yellow card) 73'	Report	Offord (yellow card) 47'; Johnson (yellow card) 86'	Stadium: Abbey Stadium; Attendance: 5,428; Referee: Sam Allison

29 January 2022 28	Crewe Alexandra	0–2	Rotherham United	Crewe
15:00 GMT	Johnson (yellow card) 33'; Robertson (yellow card) 68' (yellow-red card) 73'; Sass-Davies (yellow card) 78'	Report	Smith 7'; Ihiekwe (yellow card) 25'; Wood (yellow card) 45+3'; Richards 74' (o.g.)	Stadium: Mornflake Stadium; Attendance: 5,014; Referee: Ben Speedie

1 February 2022 29	Gillingham	1–0	Crewe Alexandra	Gillingham
19:45 GMT	Lloyd 16' (pen.); Tutonda (yellow card) 65'; McKenzie (yellow card) 90+7'	Report		Stadium: Priestfield; Attendance: 4,917; Referee: Darren Drysdale

8 February 2022 30	Crewe Alexandra	1–4	Plymouth Argyle	Crewe
19:45 GMT	Long 19'; Agyei (yellow card) 76'	Report	Scarr (yellow card) 13'; Randell (penalty missed) 23'; Hardie 48', 56', (yellow card) 68', (goal) 85'; Ennis 55'	Stadium: Mornflake Stadium; Attendance: 3,874; Referee: John Busby

12 February 2022 31	Accrington Stanley	4–1	Crewe Alexandra	Accrington
15:00 GMT	Sykes 12', 60', (yellow card) 90+4'; Butcher (yellow card) 29'; Leigh 51'; McConville 64'	Report	Agyei (yellow card) 16', (goal) 90+3'; Johnson (yellow card) 63'; Alebiosu (yellow card) 67'	Stadium: Wham Stadium; Attendance: 2,365; Referee: Sam Barrott

15 February 2022 32	Wigan Athletic	2–0	Crewe Alexandra	Wigan
19:45 GMT	Naylor (yellow card) 16'; Lang 57'; McClean 82'; Watts (yellow card) 88'	Report	Murphy (yellow card) 47'	Stadium: DW Stadium; Attendance: 8,509; Referee: Tom Reeves

22 February 2022 33	Crewe Alexandra	0–1	Oxford United	Crewe
19:45 GMT	Offord (yellow card) 57'; Lowery (yellow card) 63'	Report	Taylor (yellow card) 48'; Kane (yellow card) 59'; Brown 65'	Stadium: Mornflake Stadium; Attendance: 3,968; Referee: Scott Oldham

26 February 2022 34	Cheltenham Town	1–2	Crewe Alexandra	Cheltenham
15:00 GMT	Boyle (yellow card) 31'; Etete 48'; Wright (yellow card) 61'	Report	Long 18'; Griffiths (yellow card) 26'; Johnson (yellow card) 64'; Porter 83'	Stadium: The Jonny Rocks Stadium; Attendance: 4,227; Referee: Anthony Backhouse

5 March 2022 35	Crewe Alexandra	1–3	Wycombe Wanderers	Crewe
15:00 GMT	Porter 58'; Offord (yellow card) 67'; Griffiths (yellow card) 79'	Report	Vokes 14'; Wing 55', (yellow card) 90+7', (goal) 90+10'	Stadium: Mornflake Stadium; Attendance: 4,031; Referee: Andy Haines

8 March 2022 36	Crewe Alexandra	1–3	Portsmouth	Crewe
19:45 GMT	Porter (yellow card) 55'; Long 90+1'	Report	Hirst 3', 66'; Thompson (yellow card) 27'; Walker 31'; Robertson (yellow card) 62'	Stadium: Mornflake Stadium; Attendance: 4,307; Referee: Andrew Kitchen

12 March 2022 37	Sunderland	2–0	Crewe Alexandra	Sunderland
15:00 GMT	Gooch (yellow card) 29'; Wright (yellow card) 74'; Cirkin (yellow card) 75'; Neil 84'; Roberts 89'; Dajaku (yellow card) 90+1'; Clarke (yellow card) 90+6'	Report	Williams (yellow card) 66'; Lundstram (yellow card) 68'; Lowery (yellow card) 76'	Stadium: Stadium of Light; Attendance: 30,036; Referee: Neil Hair

15 March 2022 38	Crewe Alexandra	0–2	Wigan Athletic	Crewe
19:45 GMT	Porter (yellow card) 89'	Report	Magennis 43'; Keane 53'; Bennett (yellow card) 62'; Darikwa (yellow card) 63'	Stadium: Mornflake Stadium; Attendance: 5,310; Referee: Ben Toner

19 March 2022 39	Crewe Alexandra	0–1	Bolton Wanderers	Crewe
15:00 GMT	Johnson (yellow card) 34'	Report	Afolayan (yellow card) 34'; Bakayoko 90'	Stadium: Mornflake Stadium; Attendance: 5,985; Referee: Sam Purkiss

2 April 2022 40	Crewe Alexandra	1–3	Fleetwood Town	Crewe
15:00 BST	Long 45+3'	Report	Macadam 18'; Pilkington 64'; Harrison 73'	Stadium: Alexandra Stadium; Attendance: 3,813; Referee: Will Finnie

5 April 2022 41	Milton Keynes Dons	2–1	Crewe Alexandra	Denbigh
19:45 BST	Parrott 24'; Coventry 40'	Report	Mandron (yellow card) 86'; Sambou 90+4'	Stadium: Stadium MK; Referee: Ross Joyce

9 April 2022 42	Doncaster Rovers	2–0	Crewe Alexandra	Doncaster
15:00 BST	Rowe 10', (yellow card) 60'; Martin 47'	Report	Mandron (yellow card) 60'; Long (yellow card) 83'	Stadium: Eco-Power Stadium; Attendance: 5,912; Referee: Declan Bourne

15 April 2022 43	Crewe Alexandra	3–1	AFC Wimbledon	Crewe
15:00 BST	Mandron 60'; Long 62'; Sambou 90+8'	Report	Cosgrove 19'	Stadium: Mornflake Stadium; Attendance: 4,668; Referee: David Webb

19 April 2022 44	Sheffield Wednesday	1–0	Crewe Alexandra	Owlerton
19:45 BST	Gregory 54' (pen.); Luongo (yellow card) 80'	Report	Ainley (yellow card) 45+2'; Richards (yellow card) 54'	Stadium: Hillsborough Stadium; Attendance: 22,566; Referee: Charles Breakspear

23 April 2022 45	Crewe Alexandra	1–1	Ipswich Town	Crewe
15:00 BST	Lowery (yellow card) 60', (goal) 86'; Griffiths (yellow card) 65'; Sass-Davies (yellow card) 90+5'	Report	Norwood (yellow card) 14'; Bakinson (yellow card) 33'; Thompson (yellow card) 40'; Chaplin 45+2'	Stadium: Mornflake Stadium; Attendance: 4,986; Referee: Simon Mather

30 April 2022 46	Lincoln City	2–1	Crewe Alexandra	Lincoln
12:30 BST	Hopper 79'; Adelakun 90'	Report	Long 21'	Stadium: LNER Stadium; Attendance: 9,147; Referee: Andrew Kitchen

=== FA Cup ===
Crewe were drawn at home to Swindon Town in the first round.

6 November 2021 First round	Crewe Alexandra	0–3	Swindon Town	Crewe
15:00 GMT	Robertson (yellow card) 79'	Report	Reed 25', (yellow card) 75', (goal) 79'; Williams (yellow card) 38'; Simpson 52'	Stadium: Alexandra Stadium; Attendance: 2,303; Referee: Trevor Kettle

=== EFL Cup ===
Crewe Alexandra were drawn away to Hartlepool United in the first round and Leeds United in the second round.

10 August 2021 First round	Hartlepool United	0–1	Crewe Alexandra	Hartlepool
19:00 BST		Report	Sass-Davies (red card) 13'; Ainley 50'; Ramsay (yellow card) 81'; Dale (yellow card) 90+2'	Stadium: Victoria Park; Attendance: 3,149; Referee: Thomas Bramall

24 August 2021 Second round	Leeds United	3–0	Crewe Alexandra	Leeds
19:45 BST	Phillips 79'; Harrison 85', 90'	Report	Murphy (yellow card) 44'; Adebisi (yellow card) 82'; Mandron (yellow card) 87'	Stadium: Elland Road; Attendance: 34,154; Referee: Ben Speedie

=== EFL Trophy ===
Pos	Div	Team	Pld	W	PW	PL	L	GF	GA	GD	Pts	Qualification
1	L1	Crewe Alexandra	3	3	0	0	0	6	0	+6	9	Advance to Round 2
2	L1	Wigan Athletic	3	1	0	1	1	2	2	0	4	Advance to Round 2
3	L1	Shrewsbury Town	3	1	0	0	2	3	4	−1	3	
4	ACA	Wolverhampton Wanderers U21	3	0	1	0	2	1	6	−5	2	

Source: EFL.com

31 August 2021 Group game 1	Shrewsbury Town	0–1	Crewe Alexandra	Shrewsbury
19:00 BST		Report	Knight 90+2'	Stadium: New Meadow; Attendance: 1,680; Referee: Sebastian Stocksbridge

5 October 2021 Group game 2	Crewe Alexandra	2–0	Wigan Athletic	Crewe
19:00 BST	Finney 14'; Griffiths (yellow card) 37'; Smith 60' (o.g.); Mandron (yellow card) 90+2'	Report	Lloyd (yellow card) 43'; Humphrys (penalty missed) 52'; Pearce (yellow card) 73'; Kerr (yellow card) 89'	Stadium: Alexandra Stadium; Attendance: 925; Referee: Tom Reeves

9 November 2021 Group game 3	Crewe Alexandra	3–0	Wolverhampton Wanderers U21	Crewe
19:00 GMT	Mandron 12', 36'; Robbins 79'	Report		Stadium: Alexandra Stadium; Attendance: 598; Referee: Martin Coy

1 December 2021 Second round	Crewe Alexandra	2–0	Doncaster Rovers	Crewe
19:45 GMT	Knight 33'; Finney 72'	Report	Knoyle (yellow card) 45'; Anderson (yellow card) 71'	Stadium: Alexandra Stadium; Attendance: 699; Referee: Ross Joyce

4 January 2022 Third round	Crewe Alexandra	2–4	Rotherham United	Crewe
19:00 GMT	Mandron 11'; Robertson 71'	Report	Harding (yellow card) 29'; Sadlier 41'; Smith 57'; Kayode 82'; Ladapo 90+4'	Stadium: Mornflake Stadium; Referee: Rebecca Welch

=== Cheshire Senior Cup ===
Crewe were drawn at home against Sandbach United in the first round.

16 November 2021 First round	Crewe Alexandra	2–1	Sandbach United	Crewe
19:45 BST				Stadium: Mornflake Stadium

18 January 2022 Second round	Crewe Alexandra	4–0	Alsager Town	Crewe
19:45 BST				Stadium: Mornflake Stadium

16 March 2022 Third round	Crewe Alexandra	2–1	Hyde United	Crewe
19:45 BST				Stadium: Mornflake Stadium

29 March 2022 Semi-final	Stockport County	5–0	Crewe Alexandra	Stockport
19:45 BST		Report		Stadium: Edgley Park

== Transfers ==
=== Transfers in ===
Date	Position	Nationality	Name	From	Fee	Ref.
1 July 2021	CB	(Republic of Ireland)	Tommie Hoban	(Scotland) Aberdeen	Free transfer	
1 July 2021	CF	(England)	Chris Long	(Scotland) Motherwell	Free transfer	
1 July 2021	CM	(Wales)	Shaun MacDonald	(England) Rotherham United	Free transfer	
30 July 2021	LB	(Scotland)	Callum McFadzean	(England) Sunderland	Free transfer	
12 August 2021	CB	(England)	Terell Thomas	(England) AFC Wimbledon	Free transfer	
30 August 2021	SS	(England)	Scott Kashket	(England) Wycombe Wanderers	Free transfer	
4 September 2021	CM	(Spain)	Madger Gomes	(England) Doncaster Rovers	Free transfer	
27 January 2022	CF	(Germany)	Bassala Sambou	(Netherlands) Fortuna Sittard	Undisclosed	
28 January 2022	CF	(England)	Dan Agyei	(England) Oxford United	Undisclosed	
28 January 2022	CM	(England)	Tariq Uwakwe	(England) Chelsea	Undisclosed	

=== Loans in ===
Date from	Position	Nationality	Name	From	Date until	Ref.
1 July 2021	RB	(England)	Kayne Ramsay	(England) Southampton	13 January 2022	
16 August 2021	RW	(England)	Ben Knight	(England) Manchester City	End of Season	
31 August 2021	CM	(Scotland)	Scott Robertson	(Scotland) Celtic	24 March 2022	
31 August 2021	RW	(England)	J'Neil Bennett	(England) Tottenham Hotspur	30 November 2021	
28 January 2022	RB	(England)	Ryan Alebiosu	(England) Arsenal	End of season	
31 January 2022	CM	(England)	Rekeem Harper	(England) Ipswich Town	End of season	

=== Loans out ===
Date from	Position	Nationality	Name	To	Date until	Ref.
9 August 2021	FB	(England)	Nathan Woodthorpe	(England) Witton Albion	October 2021	
31 August 2021	RW	(England)	Owen Dale	(England) Blackpool	11 January 2022	
11 September 2021	CB	(England)	Connor O'Riordan	(England) Kidsgrove Athletic	October 2021	
1 October 2021	CF	(England)	Tyreece Onyeka	(England) Matlock Town	November 2021	
23 October 2021	CB	(England)	Connor O'Riordan	(England) Nantwich Town	November 2021	
11 December 2021	CF	(England)	Tyreece Onyeka	(England) Stalybridge Celtic	January 2022	
17 December 2021	CM	(England)	Josh Lundstram	(England) Solihull Moors	14 January 2022	
24 December 2021	CM	(England)	Joe Robbins	(England) Nantwich Town	End of season (Note: On 24 February, Robbins' loan at Nantwich Town was extended until the end of the season.)	
4 February 2022	FW	(England)	Joel Tabiner	(England) Leek Town	March 2022	

=== Transfers out ===
Date	Position	Nationality	Name	To	Fee	Ref.
30 June 2021	CB	(Grenada)	Omar Beckles	(England) Leyton Orient	Free transfer	
30 June 2021	CB	(England)	Olly Lancashire	(England) Southampton	Released	
30 June 2021	CB	(England)	Jack Marrow	(England) 1874 Northwich	Free transfer	
30 June 2021	CB	(Republic of Ireland)	Eddie Nolan	(Republic of Ireland) Waterford	Released	
30 June 2021	RW	(England)	Daniel Powell	(England) Barnet	Released	
30 June 2021	FW	(England)	Jakob Priestman	(United States) Missouri State Bears	Free transfer	
30 June 2021	DM	(England)	Ryan Wintle	(Wales) Cardiff City	Free transfer	
16 July 2021	RB	(England)	Jamie Wrench	(England) Stockport Town	Free transfer	
27 July 2021	CM	(England)	Matthew McDonald	(England) Warrington Town	Free transfer	
2 August 2021	LW	(England)	Kyle Stubbs	(England) Kidsgrove Athletic	Free transfer	
12 August 2021	LW	(England)	Charlie Kirk	(England) Charlton Athletic	Undisclosed	
16 August 2021	CB	(Republic of Ireland)	Tommie Hoban	Retired		
1 September 2021	CM	(Wales)	Shaun MacDonald	(Wales) Penybont	Retired Professionally	
13 January 2022	RW	(England)	Owen Dale	(England) Blackpool	Undisclosed	
24 January 2022	CB	(Montserrat)	Donervon Daniels	(England) Walsall	Free transfer	
27 January 2022	LB	(Scotland)	Callum McFadzean	(Wales) Wrexham	Free transfer	
31 January 2022	CB	(England)	Terell Thomas	(England) Reading	Mutual consent	
