= J'Neil Bennett =

English footballer (born 2001)

Personal information
- Full name: J'Neil Lloyd Bennett
- Date of birth: 7 December 2001 (age 24)
- Place of birth: Camden, England
- Height: 1.78 m (5 ft 10 in)
- Position: Left winger

Youth career
- –2017: Queens Park Rangers
- 2017–2021: Tottenham Hotspur

Senior career*
Years	Team	Apps	(Gls)
2021–2022	Tottenham Hotspur	0	(0)
2021–2022	→ Crewe Alexandra (loan)	9	(1)
2022–2023	Brentford	0	(0)

International career
2018–2019	England U18	5	(1)
- * Club domestic league appearances and goals as of 18:06, 5 May 2024 (UTC)

J'Neil Lloyd Bennett (born 7 December 2001) is an English professional footballer who plays as a left winger.

Bennett is a product of the Tottenham Hotspur Academy and began his professional career with the club. After gaining his first senior experience away on loan at Crewe Alexandra, he transferred to Brentford in 2022. Bennett was capped by England at U18 level.

== Early life ==
Bennett was born in London and grew up in Camden. He attended Haverstock School.

== Club career ==
=== Tottenham Hotspur ===
A left winger, Bennett began his career in the Queens Park Rangers Academy and moved into the Tottenham Hotspur Academy in 2017. He progressed into the U18 team during the 2017–18 season and signed a scholarship deal at the end of the campaign. Bennett had a breakout 2018–19 season, in which he made U17, U18, U19 and Development Squad appearances. His 2018 Euro Youth Cup performances for the U17 team saw him named as the Player of the Tournament and late in the season, he scored the first goal at the new Tottenham Hotspur Stadium during a test event.

Bennett progressed into the Development Squad and signed his first professional contract on New Year's Eve 2019. On 19 August 2021, he received his maiden call into a first team matchday squad and made his professional debut as a substitute for Ryan Sessegnon after 81 minutes of a 1–0 UEFA Europa Conference League playoff round first leg defeat to Paços de Ferreira.

Bennett joined League One club Crewe Alexandra on trial during the 2021–22 pre-season and he joined the club on a half-season loan on 31 August 2021. On his second competitive appearance for the Railwaymen, Bennett's first-half cross forced an own goal and he later broke away to score his first professional goal in a 2–0 victory over Burton Albion. In November 2021, an ankle ligament injury saw Bennett return to Tottenham Hotspur for treatment and rehabilitation and the loan expired before his return to fitness. He made 11 appearances and scored one goal during his spell at Gresty Road. After returning to fitness, Bennett played the remainder of the 2021–22 season for the Tottenham Hotspur Development Squad and was released when his contract expired in June 2022.

=== Brentford ===
Early in the 2022–23 season, Bennett joined the B team at Premier League club Brentford on a trial which was interrupted due to a back injury. After returning to fitness, he signed a one-year contract, with the option of a further year, on 30 November 2022. Bennett was released at the end of the 2022–23 season, when the club neglected to take up the option on his contract.

=== Free agent ===
Beginning in mid-November 2023, Bennett engaged in training sessions with former club Crewe Alexandra. He suffered an injury prior to Christmas 2023.

== International career ==
Bennett won five caps and scored one goal for England at U18 level during the 2018–19 season.

== Career statistics ==
As of match played 9 November 2021

Appearances and goals by club, season and competition
Club	Season	League			FA Cup		League Cup		Europe		Other		Total	
Club	Season	Division	Apps	Goals	Apps	Goals	Apps	Goals	Apps	Goals	Apps	Goals	Apps	Goals
Tottenham Hotspur U23	2018–19	—									2 (Note: Appearance(s) in EFL Trophy)	0	2	0
Tottenham Hotspur U23	2019–20	—									1	0	1	0
Tottenham Hotspur U23	Total		—		—		—		—		3	0	3	0
Tottenham Hotspur	2021–22	Premier League	0	0	—		—		1 (Note: Appearance in UEFA Europa Conference League)	0	—		1	0
Crewe Alexandra (loan)	2021–22	League One	9	1	1	0	0	0	—		1	0	11	1
Career total			9	1	1	0	0	0	1	0	4	0	15	1

== Honours ==
- Euro Youth Cup Player of the Tournament: 2018
