= Travis Johnson (English footballer) =

English footballer

Personal information
- Full name: Travis Joel Gary Johnson
- Date of birth: 28 August 2000 (age 26)
- Place of birth: Stoke-on-Trent, England
- Height: 5 ft 11 in (1.80 m)
- Position: Right-back

Youth career
- –2018: Crewe Alexandra

Senior career*
Years	Team	Apps	(Gls)
2018–2022	Crewe Alexandra	28	(0)
2020	→ Witton Albion (loan)	1	(0)
2022–2024	Crawley Town	32	(0)
- * Club domestic league appearances and goals as of 08:18, 24 May 2024 (UTC)

Travis Joel Gary Johnson (born 28 August 2000) is an English professional footballer who most recently played as a right-back for EFL League Two club Crawley Town. He previously played for Crewe Alexandra.

== Career ==
=== Crewe Alexandra ===
Johnson joined Crewe Alexandra's Academy and signed his first professional contract in the summer of 2018, agreeing a new contract in June 2019. He made his first Crewe start and first-team debut in an EFL Trophy group stage game at Mansfield Town on 8 October 2019, and his league debut on 11 January 2020, coming on as a 68th minute substitute for Nicky Hunt, at Swindon Town. On 13 March 2020, Johnson joined Witton Albion until 25 April 2020.

He was offered a new contract in June 2020, and signed a new one-year deal. On 13 May 2021, Crewe announced that it had triggered a contract extension. In November 2021, Johnson suffered an ankle ligament injury during training, ruling him out of first-team action for some weeks. Johnson was initially offered a new contract at the end of the 2021–22 season following Crewe's relegation, however this offer was later withdrawn, allowing Johnson to leave the club on a free transfer.

=== Crawley Town ===
On 20 June 2022, it was announced that Johnson was joining EFL League Two club Crawley Town on a two-year contract on 1 July 2022, following the expiry of his contract at Crewe. He was released by Crawley in May 2024.

== Career statistics ==
As of 24 May 2024

Appearances and goals by club, season and competition
Club	Season	League			FA Cup		League Cup		Other		Total	
Club	Season	Division	Apps	Goals	Apps	Goals	Apps	Goals	Apps	Goals	Apps	Goals
Crewe Alexandra	2019–20	League Two	1	0	0	0	0	0	2 (Note: Appearances in EFL Trophy)	0	3	0
Crewe Alexandra	2020–21	League One	7	0	1	0	0	0	4	0	12	0
Crewe Alexandra	2021–22	League One	20	0	0	0	1	0	4	0	25	0
Crewe Alexandra	Crewe total		28	0	1	0	1	0	10	0	40	0
Crawley Town	2022–23	League Two	25	0	1	0	3	0	3	0	32	0
Crawley Town	2023–24	League Two	7	0	1	0	1	0	4	0	13	0
Crawley Town	Crawley total		32	0	2	0	4	0	7	0	45	0
Career total			60	0	3	0	5	0	17	0	85	0
