= Tyreece Onyeka =

English footballer

Personal information
- Full name: Tyreece Obiora Onyeka
- Date of birth: 1 September 2001 (age 25)
- Place of birth: Stoke-on-Trent, England
- Height: 5 ft 11 in (1.81 m)
- Position: Forward

Team information
- Current team: Leek Town

Youth career
- –2020: Crewe Alexandra

Senior career*
Years	Team	Apps	(Gls)
2020–2022	Crewe Alexandra	1	(0)
2021	→ Matlock Town (loan)	2	(0)
2021	→ Stalybridge Celtic (loan)	2	(0)
2023–2024	Stafford Rangers	11	(4)
2024–	Leek Town		
- * Club domestic league appearances and goals as of 17:29, 3 July 2022 (UTC)

Tyreece Obiora Onyeka (born 1 September 2001) is an English professional footballer who plays as a forward for Northern Premier League Premier Division club Leek Town. He formerly played for EFL League One club Crewe Alexandra.

== Career ==
A graduate of Crewe Alexandra's Academy, he signed a professional contract in 2020. In October 2021, he joined the Northern Premier League Premier Division side Matlock Town on a month-long loan before having a similar spell at Stalybridge Celtic in December that year.

Upon returning to Crewe, he made his debut for the club in their 0–0 home draw against Shrewsbury Town in League One on 15 January 2022, coming on as an 85th minute substitute for Chris Long. Following relegation to League Two, Onyeka was released by Crewe at the end of the 2021–22 season.

== Career statistics ==
As of 17 January 2022.

Club	Season	Division	League		FA Cup		League Cup		Other		Total	
Club	Season	Division	Apps	Goals	Apps	Goals	Apps	Goals	Apps	Goals	Apps	Goals
Crewe Alexandra	2021–22	League One	1	0	0	0	0	0	0	0	1	0
Crewe Alexandra	Crewe Alexandra total		1	0	0	0	0	0	0	0	1	0
