= Kayne Ramsay =

English footballer (born 2000)

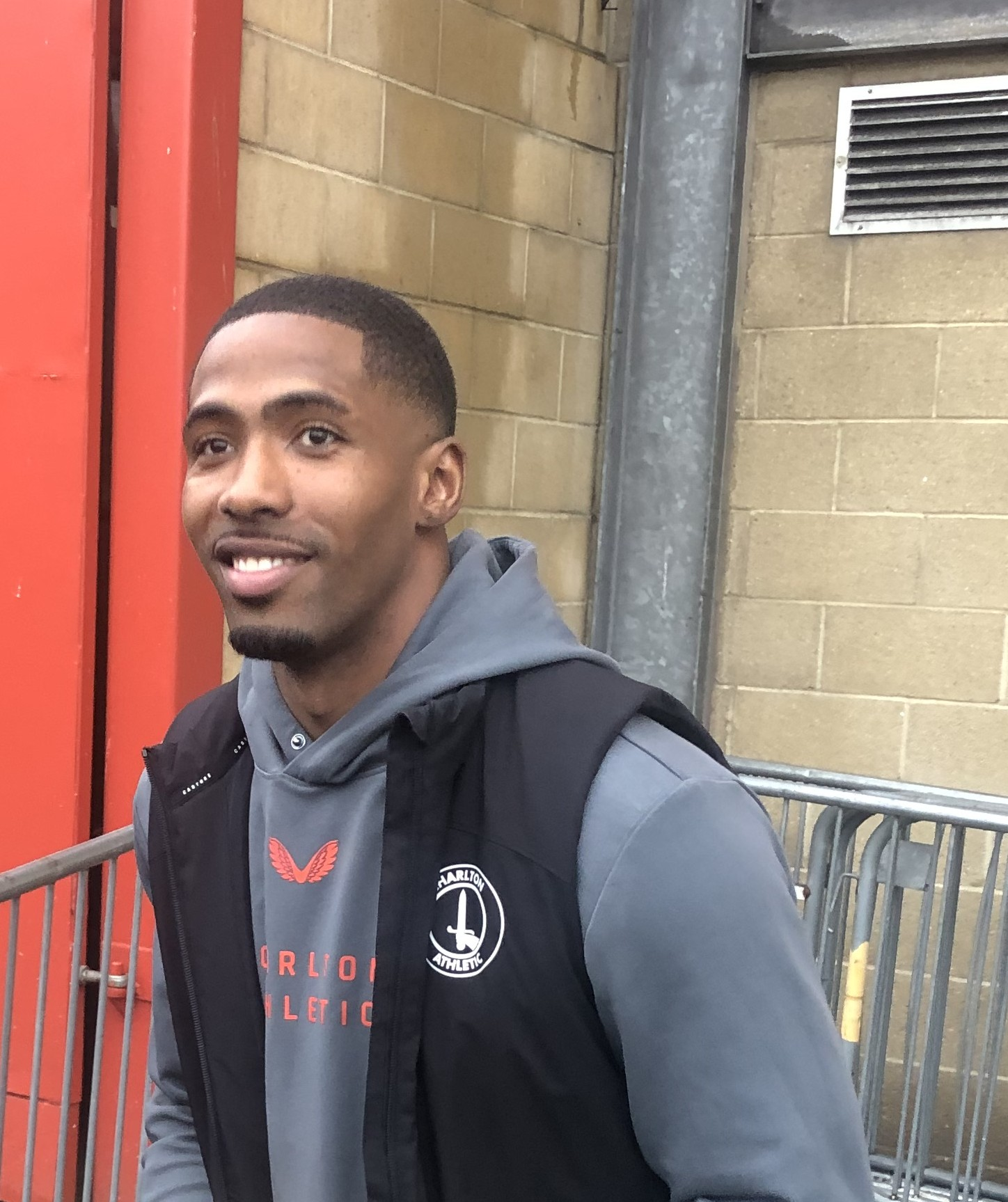
- Ramsey in 2025

Personal information
- Full name: Kayne Richard Junior Ramsay
- Date of birth: 10 October 2000 (age 26)
- Place of birth: Hackney, England
- Height: 5 ft 10 in (1.79 m)
- Position: Defender

Team information
- Current team: Charlton Athletic
- Number: 2

Youth career
- 2010–2017: Chelsea
- 2017–2018: Southampton

Senior career*
Years	Team	Apps	(Gls)
2018–2022	Southampton	2	(0)
2020	→ Shrewsbury Town (loan)	5	(0)
2021–2022	→ Crewe Alexandra (loan)	15	(0)
2022	→ Ross County (loan)	8	(1)
2022–2024	Harrogate Town	50	(0)
2024–	Charlton Athletic	81	(2)
- * Club domestic league appearances and goals as of 17:10, 31 October 2026 (UTC)

Kayne Richard Junior Ramsay (born 10 October 2000) is an English professional footballer who plays as a defender for EFL Championship club Charlton Athletic.

== Club career ==
=== Southampton ===
A right back, Ramsay joined Southampton from Chelsea in 2017 as a youth prospect. After impressing in the youth teams he signed a professional contract on 19 September 2018.

On 30 December 2018, Ramsay was given his first team debut. Manager Ralph Hasenhüttl named him in the starting XI for the Premier League match against defending champions Manchester City at St Mary's Stadium. At 18 years and 81 days he became the youngest starter in the Premier League during the 2018–19 season.

==== Shrewsbury Town (loan) ====
On 31 January 2020, Ramsay joined League One side Shrewsbury Town on a six-month loan deal until the end of the 2019–20 season. Shrewsbury boss Sam Ricketts stated "He is extremely athletic, can carry the ball and drive the play forward and has strong potential". The move made Ramsay the club's fifth January signing.

==== Crewe Alexandra (loan) ====
On 22 June 2021, Ramsay joined League One side Crewe Alexandra on loan for the 2021–22 season, making his first league start for Crewe on 7 August 2021 in a 1–1 draw against Cheltenham Town at Gresty Road. On his 12th league appearance for Crewe, Ramsey suffered an injury against Sunderland on 19 October 2021, ruling him out of first-team action for between six and eight weeks. On 14 January 2022, Ramsay was recalled by Southampton.

==== Ross County (loan) ====
On 14 January 2022, Ramsay joined Scottish Premiership side Ross County on loan for the remainder of the 2021–22 season shortly after being recalled from Crewe. Ramsey scored his only goal for County in a 1–1 draw with Livingston in the Scottish Premiership.

=== Harrogate Town ===
On 13 August 2022, Ramsay joined League Two side Harrogate Town on a permanent transfer. On the same day, Ramsay made his debut for Harrogate Town in a 0–0 draw with Crawley Town.

=== Charlton Athletic ===
On 1 February 2024, Ramsay joined Charlton Athletic on a three-and-a-half-year contract.

On 27 August 2026, Ramsay signed a new four-year contract with the club keeping him.at Charlton until the summer of 2030.

== Career statistics ==
As of match played 31 October 2026

Club	Season	League			FA Cup		League Cup		Other		Total	
Club	Season	Division	Apps	Goals	Apps	Goals	Apps	Goals	Apps	Goals	Apps	Goals
Southampton U21	2018–19 EFL Trophy		—		—		—		2 (Note: Appearances in the EFL Trophy)	0	2	0
Southampton U21	2019–20 EFL Trophy		—		—		—		3	0	3	0
Southampton U21	2020–21 EFL Trophy		—		—		—		2	0	2	0
Southampton U21	Southampton U21 total		—		—		—		7	0	7	0
Southampton	2018–19	Premier League	1	0	1	0	0	0	–		2	0
Southampton	2019–20	Premier League	0	0	0	0	0	0	–		0	0
Southampton	2020–21	Premier League	1	0	1	0	0	0	–		2	0
Southampton	Southampton total		2	0	2	0	0	0	0	0	4	0
Shrewsbury Town (loan)	2019–20	League One	5	0	0	0	—		—		5	0
Crewe Alexandra (loan)	2021–22	League One	15	0	0	0	2	0	2	0	19	0
Ross County (loan)	2021–22	Scottish Premiership	8	1	1	0	0	0	–		9	1
Harrogate Town	2022–23	League Two	26	0	2	0	0	0	3	0	31	0
Harrogate Town	2023–24	League Two	24	0	2	0	2	0	2	0	30	0
Harrogate Town	Harrogate Town total		50	0	4	0	2	0	5	0	61	0
Charlton Athletic	2023–24	League One	7	0	–		–		–		7	0
Charlton Athletic	2024–25	League One	32	1	0	0	1	0	3 (Note: Appearance in the League One play-offs.)	0	36	1
Charlton Athletic	2025–26	Championship	37	0	0	0	0	0	–		37	0
Charlton Athletic	2026–27	Championship	5	1	0	0	0	0	–		5	1
Charlton Athletic	Charlton Athletic total		81	2	0	0	1	0	3	0	85	2
Career total			161	3	7	0	5	0	17	0	190	3

== Honours ==
Charlton Athletic

- EFL League One play-offs: 2025
