= Scott Robertson (footballer, born 2001) =

Scottish footballer (born 2001)

Personal information
- Full name: Scott Alexander Cameron Robertson
- Date of birth: 27 July 2001 (age 25)
- Place of birth: Lenzie, Scotland
- Height: 6 ft 1 in (1.85 m)
- Positions: Central midfielder; defensive midfielder; centre back

Team information
- Current team: Notts County
- Number: 20

Youth career
- 2006–2009: Lenzie Youths
- 2009–2019: Celtic

Senior career*
| Years | Team | Apps | (Gls) |
| 2019–2023 | Celtic | 0 | (0) |
| 2020–2021 | → Gillingham (loan) | 15 | (0) |
| 2021 | → Doncaster Rovers (loan) | 15 | (0) |
| 2021 | → Crewe Alexandra (loan) | 20 | (1) |
| 2023–2024 | Fleetwood Town | 25 | (0) |
| 2024– | Notts County | 49 | (3) |
- * Club domestic league appearances and goals as of 18:30, 8 July 2026 (UTC)

Scott Alexander Cameron Robertson (born 27 July 2001) is a Scottish professional footballer who plays as a central midfielder for EFL League One club Notts County.

== Career ==
=== Celtic ===
Raised in Lenzie and a product of the club's youth system, Robertson made his senior debut aged 18 in a 2019–20 UEFA Europa League group stage fixture against CFR Cluj on 12 December 2019; with Celtic's final position at the head of the table already confirmed, a below-strength team lost 2–0. He had already featured for Celtic's under-21 team in the 2018–19 and 2019–20 editions of the Scottish Challenge Cup, scoring in a defeat to Falkirk, and in July 2019, a few days before he turned 18, signed a contract running until summer 2021.

==== Loan spells ====
In September 2020, he joined Gillingham on a season-long loan. He made his debut for the club coming on as a substitute in a 2-0 defeat to Hull City. After making 15 league appearances for the Gills, Robertson was recalled by Celtic on 11 January 2021.

On 30 January 2021, Robertson joined League One side Doncaster Rovers on loan for the remainder of the 2020–21 season.

On 30 August 2021, Robertson returned to England to join Crewe Alexandra on loan for the 2021–22 season. He made his Crewe debut the following day, 31 August, in a 1–0 victory at Shrewsbury Town in an EFL Trophy group tie. Just over a month later, on 2 October 2021, he scored his first Crewe goal in a 2–2 draw with Cambridge United at Gresty Road. Injured in Crewe's league game at Accrington Stanley on 12 February 2022, Robertson had an operation and returned to Celtic to continue his rehabilitation in March 2022.

=== Fleetwood Town ===
On 20 January 2023, Robertson made a permanent transfer to League One club Fleetwood Town, signing a two-and-a-half-year contract.

=== Notts County ===
On 29 December 2023, Robertson signed a two-and-a-half-year contract for Notts County, with effect from 13 January 2024.

== Career statistics ==
As of 25 March 2022

Appearances and goals by club, season and competition
| Club | Season | League | | | FA Cup | | League Cup | | Other | | Total | |
| Club | Season | Division | Apps | Goals | Apps | Goals | Apps | Goals | Apps | Goals | Apps | Goals |
|---|---|---|---|---|---|---|---|---|---|---|---|---|
| Celtic | 2019–20 | Scottish Premiership | 0 | 0 | 0 | 0 | 0 | 0 | 1 (Note: Appearance in UEFA Europa League) | 0 | 1 | 0 |
| Celtic | 2020–21 | Scottish Premiership | 0 | 0 | 0 | 0 | 0 | 0 | 0 | 0 | 0 | 0 |
| Celtic | 2021–22 | Scottish Premiership | 0 | 0 | 0 | 0 | 0 | 0 | 0 | 0 | 0 | 0 |
| Celtic | 2022–23 | Scottish Premiership | 0 | 0 | 0 | 0 | 0 | 0 | 0 | 0 | 0 | 0 |
| Celtic | Total | | 0 | 0 | 0 | 0 | 0 | 0 | 1 | 0 | 1 | 0 |
| Gillingham (loan) | 2020–21 | EFL League One | 15 | 0 | 1 | 0 | 2 | 0 | 1 (Note: Appearance in EFL Trophy) | 0 | 19 | 0 |
| Doncaster Rovers (loan) | 2020–21 | EFL League One | 15 | 0 | 0 | 0 | 0 | 0 | 0 | 0 | 15 | 0 |
| Crewe Alexandra (loan) | 2021–22 | EFL League One | 20 | 1 | 1 | 0 | 0 | 0 | 2 | 1 | 23 | 2 |
| Fleetwood Town | 2022–23 | EFL League One | 0 | 0 | 0 | 0 | 0 | 0 | 0 | 0 | 0 | 0 |
| Career total | | | 50 | 1 | 2 | 0 | 2 | 0 | 4 | 1 | 58 | 2 |

== Honours ==
Notts County

- EFL League Two play-offs: 2026
