= Nathan Woodthorpe =

English footballer

Personal information
- Full name: Nathan John Edward Woodthorpe
- Date of birth: 6 December 2001 (age 24)
- Place of birth: Crewe, England
- Height: 6 ft 2 in (1.88 m)
- Position: Defender

Team information
- Current team: Chester
- Number: 3

Youth career
- –2020: Crewe Alexandra

Senior career*
Years	Team	Apps	(Gls)
2020–2022	Crewe Alexandra	0	(0)
2021	→ Witton Albion (loan)	14	(1)
2023	Lancaster City	15	(0)
2023–	Chester	116	(2)
2023–2024	→ Marine (loan)	23	(1)
- * Club domestic league appearances and goals as of 10:00 18 November 2026 (UTC)

Nathan John Edward Woodthorpe (born 6 December 2001) is an English professional footballer who plays as a defender for National League North club Chester. He is the son of former footballer Colin Woodthorpe.

== Career ==
A graduate of Crewe Alexandra's Academy, he signed a professional contract in 2020.

In August 2021, Woodthorpe joined Witton Albion on an initial month-long loan, which was extended for a second month. He scored on his debut for the club in their 1-1 draw against Gainsborough Trinity.

Upon returning to Crewe, he made his Crewe debut on 9 November 2021 in an EFL Trophy group game against Wolves Under-21s at Gresty Road, but after his second appearance, against Doncaster Rovers on 1 December 2021 in the same competition, suffered an ankle injury. Following relegation to League Two, Woodthorpe was released by Crewe at the end of the 2021–22 season.

On 3 February 2023, Woodthorpe signed for Northern Premier League side Lancaster City.

After joining Chester, he was loaned to Marine in July 2023 until January 2024.

== Career statistics ==
As of 19 November 2025.

Club	Season	Division	League		FA Cup		League Cup		Other		Total	
Club	Season	Division	Apps	Goals	Apps	Goals	Apps	Goals	Apps	Goals	Apps	Goals
Crewe Alexandra	2020–21	League One	0	0	0	0	0	0	0	0	0	0
Crewe Alexandra	2021–22	League One	0	0	0	0	0	0	2 (Note: Appearance(s) in EFL Trophy)	0	2	0
Crewe Alexandra	Total		0	0	0	0	0	0	2	0	2	0
Witton Albion (loan)	2021–22	NPL Premier Division	14	1	0	0	—		0	0	14	1
Lancaster City	2022–23	NPL Premier Division	15	0	0	0	—		0	0	15	0
Chester	2023–24	National League North	17	0	—		—		0	0	17	0
Chester	2024–25	National League North	44	0	3	0	—		4 (Note: One appearance in FA Trophy, three appearances in National League North play-offs)	0	51	0
Chester	2025–26	National League North	16	1	4	0	—		1 (Note: Appearance(s) in Cheshire Senior Cup)	0	21	1
Chester	Total		77	1	7	0	—		5	0	89	1
Marine (loan)	2023–24	NPL Premier Division	23	1	7	0	—		0	0	30	1
Career total			129	3	14	0	0	0	7	0	150	3
