= Nile John =

English footballer

Personal information
- Full name: Nile Omari Mckenzie John
- Date of birth: 6 March 2003 (age 23)
- Place of birth: White City, London, England
- Height: 1.76 m (5 ft 9 in)
- Position: Midfielder

Team information
- Current team: Moreirense
- Number: 23

Youth career
- –2016: Brentford
- 2016–2021: Tottenham Hotspur

Senior career*
Years	Team	Apps	(Gls)
2021–2024	Tottenham Hotspur	0	(0)
2022	→ Charlton Athletic (loan)	0	(0)
2024–2026	Feirense	35	(7)
2026–	Moreirense	14	(0)

International career^{‡}
2017–2018	England U15	4	(0)
2018–2019	England U16	10	(5)
2020	England U17	2	(0)
2021	England U19	7	(0)
- * Club domestic league appearances and goals as of 25 May 2026 ‡ National team caps and goals as of 17:10, 9 April 2026 (UTC)

Nile Omari Mckenzie John (born 6 March 2003) is an English professional footballer who plays as a midfielder for Primeira Liga club Moreirense.

== Club career ==
=== Tottenham Hotspur ===
John made his professional debut on 24 February 2021 for Tottenham coming on in as a substitute in the Europa League game against Wolfsberger AC which ended 4–0.

On 19 August 2021, John made his first start for Tottenham by playing in the inaugural UEFA Europa Conference League competition against Paços de Ferreira, which ended in a 1–0 defeat.

==== Charlton Athletic (loan) ====
On 27 January 2022, John joined Charlton Athletic on loan for the rest of the 2021–22 season. He sat on the bench on a number of occasions without playing a competitive match for the club.

=== Feirense ===
On 6 August 2024, John signed for Liga Portugal 2 club Feirense. He made 35 appearances for the side, scoring seven goals and providing one assist.

=== Moreirense ===
On 28 January 2026, John joined Primeira Liga club Moreirense, signing a contract until June 2029.

== International career ==
Having represented England from U15 to U17 level, John made his debut for the England U19s during a 2–0 victory over Italy U19s at St. George's Park on 2 September 2021.

== Career statistics ==
As of match 4 April 2026

Appearances and goals by club, season and competition
Club	Season	League			National cup		League cup		Continental		Other		Total	
Club	Season	Division	Apps	Goals	Apps	Goals	Apps	Goals	Apps	Goals	Apps	Goals	Apps	Goals
Tottenham Hotspur	2020–21	Premier League	0	0	0	0	0	0	1 (Note: Appearance(s) in UEFA Europa League)	0	—		1	0
Tottenham Hotspur	2021–22	Premier League	0	0	0	0	0	0	1 (Note: Appearance(s) in UEFA Europa Conference League)	0	—		1	0
Tottenham Hotspur	2022–23	Premier League	0	0	0	0	0	0	0	0	—		0	0
Tottenham Hotspur	2023–24	Premier League	0	0	0	0	0	0	0	0	—		0	0
Tottenham Hotspur	Tottenham Hotspur total		0	0	0	0	0	0	2	0	0	0	2	0
Charlton Athletic (loan)	2021–22	League One	0	0	—		—		—		—		0	0
Feirense	2024–25	Liga Portugal 2	18	4	0	0	0	0	—		—		18	4
Feirense	2025–26	Liga Portugal 2	17	3	0	0	0	0	—		—		17	3
Feirense	Feirense total		35	7	0	0	0	0	0	0	0	0	35	7
Moreirense	2025–26	Primeira Liga	9	0	0	0	0	0	—		—		9	0
Career total			44	7	0	0	0	0	2	0	0	0	46	7
