= Connor Evans =

Connor Evans may refer to:

- Connor Evans (footballer, born 2003), Welsh footballer for Bangor City 1876
- Connor Evans (footballer, born 1997), Welsh footballer for Northampton
- Connor Evans (rugby union), South African rugby union player
