= Aaron Rowe =

English footballer (born 2000)

Personal information
- Full name: Aaron Kevin Isaac Rowe
- Date of birth: 7 September 2000 (age 26)
- Place of birth: Hackney, England
- Height: 5 ft 6 in (1.68 m)
- Positions: Right winger; full-back

Team information
- Current team: Hornchurch
- Number: 26

Youth career
- –2018: Leyton Orient
- 2018–2019: Huddersfield Town

Senior career*
Years	Team	Apps	(Gls)
2019–2024	Huddersfield Town	25	(1)
2019	→ Boston United (loan)	2	(0)
2020	→ Bromley (loan)	2	(0)
2023	→ Stockport County (loan)	3	(0)
2023–2024	→ Crewe Alexandra (loan)	38	(2)
2024–2026	Gillingham	43	(2)
2026–	Hornchurch	9	(2)
- * Club domestic league appearances and goals as of 21:30, 8 November 2026 (UTC)

Aaron Kevin Isaac Rowe (born 7 September 2000) is an English professional footballer who plays for Hornchurch. He plays as a right winger or full-back.

== Club career ==
=== Leyton Orient ===
==== Youth career ====
Rowe joined Leyton Orient and made a number of appearances for their under 18 side during the 2016 to 2018 period.

=== Huddersfield Town ===
Rowe signed for Huddersfield Town as a youth player in February 2018. He made his senior debut on 9 March 2019, in a 2–0 home Premier League defeat against AFC Bournemouth.

On 27 March 2019, Rowe signed a three-year professional contract up to the end of the 2021–22 season.

He scored his first goal for the club on 9 January 2021 in a 3–2 FA Cup defeat to Plymouth Argyle and his first league goal on 17 April 2021 in the 2–0 EFL Championship away win against Nottingham Forest.

On 31 January 2023, Rowe joined League Two club Stockport County on loan for the remainder of the season.

==== Crewe Alexandra (loan) ====
On 30 August 2023, Rowe joined League Two side Crewe Alexandra on a season-long loan. He made his Crewe debut on 2 September 2023, coming on as a 75th minute replacement for Courtney Baker-Richardson and providing an assist for Crewe's third goal, scored by Chris Long, in a 3–1 win over Milton Keynes Dons at Gresty Road. Rowe scored his first Crewe goals on 14 November 2023, netting twice in the first half of the side's 3–1 FA Cup first round replay win at Derby County.

=== Gillingham ===
On 7 June 2024, Rowe agreed to join League Two side Gillingham upon the expiration of his Huddersfield Town contract.

He was released by Gillingham at the end of the 2025–26 season.

== Personal life ==
Rowe is the younger brother of former Southampton man Omar Rowe, who has played in Cyprus. He is of Jamaican descent.

== Career statistics ==
As of 31 August 2024

Appearances and goals by club, season and competition
Club	Season	League			FA Cup		League Cup		Other		Total	
Club	Season	Division	Apps	Goals	Apps	Goals	Apps	Goals	Apps	Goals	Apps	Goals
Huddersfield Town	2018–19	Premier League	2	0	0	0	0	0	—		2	0
Huddersfield Town	2019–20	Championship	1	0	0	0	0	0	—		1	0
Huddersfield Town	2020–21	Championship	20	1	1	1	1	0	—		22	2
Huddersfield Town	2021–22	Championship	1	0	0	0	0	0	—		1	0
Huddersfield Town	2022–23	Championship	1	0	0	0	0	0	—		1	0
Huddersfield Town	Total		25	1	1	1	1	0	0	0	27	2
Boston United (loan)	2019–20	National League North	2	0	0	0	0	0	0	0	2	0
Bromley (loan)	2019–20	National League	2	0	0	0	0	0	0	0	2	0
Stockport County (loan)	2022–23	League Two	2	0	0	0	0	0	1 (Note: Appearance in League Two play-off)	0	3	0
Crewe Alexandra (loan)	2023–24	League Two	38	2	3	3	0	0	6 (Note: Three appearances in EFL Trophy, three appearances in League Two play-offs)	0	47	5
Gillingham	2024–25	League Two	3	0	0	0	1	0	0	0	4	0
Career total			72	3	4	4	2	0	7	0	85	7
