= Lewis Billington =

English footballer

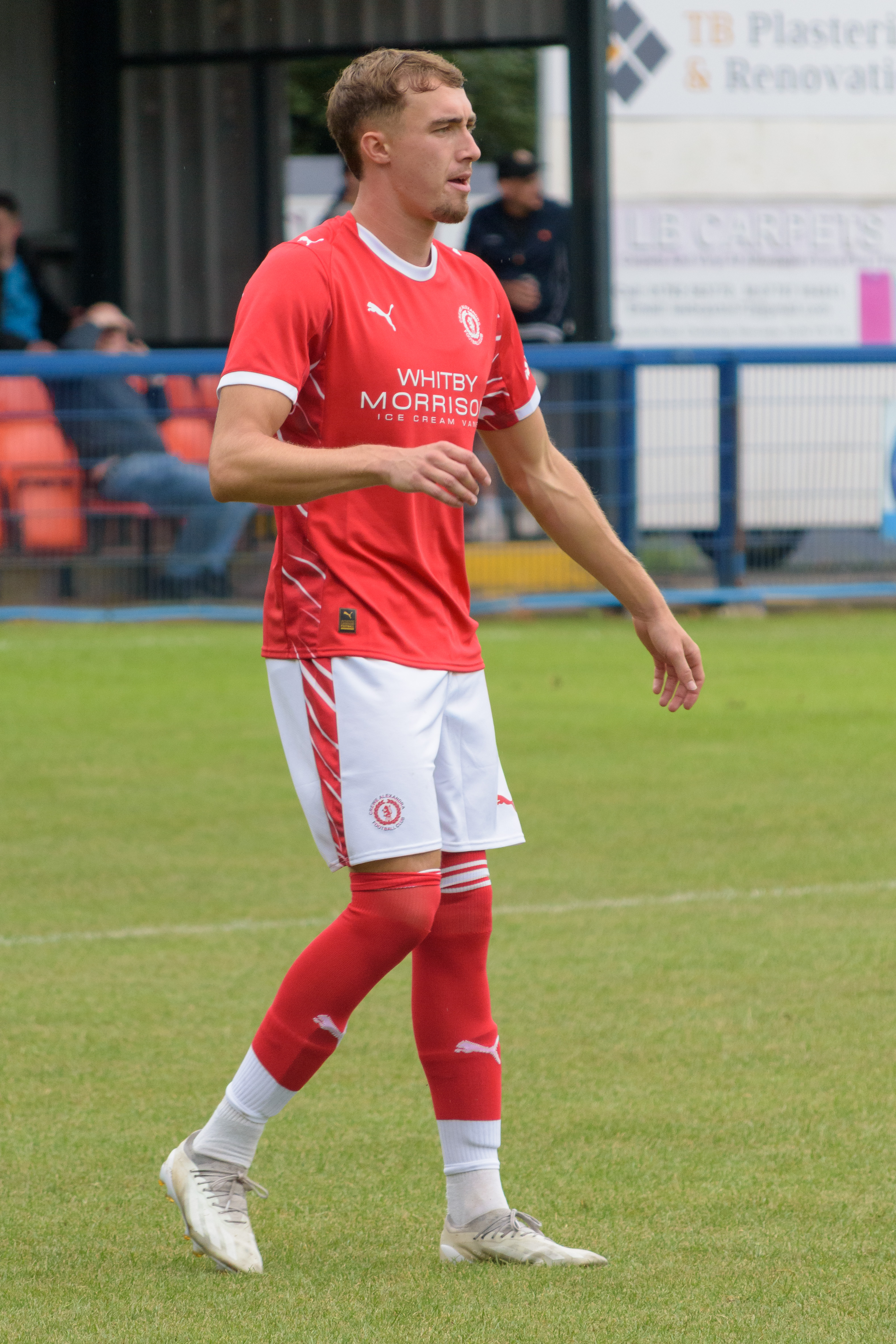
- Billington playing for Crewe Alexandra in 2025

Personal information
- Full name: Lewis Carl Billington
- Date of birth: 17 February 2004 (age 22)
- Place of birth: Sandbach, England
- Height: 6 ft 2 in (1.89 m)
- Position: Defender

Team information
- Current team: Crewe Alexandra
- Number: 2

Youth career
- –2020: Crewe Alexandra

Senior career*
Years	Team	Apps	(Gls)
2020–	Crewe Alexandra	110	(1)
2023	→ Leek Town (loan)	16	(0)
- * Club domestic league appearances and goals as of 16:20, 21 November 2026 (UTC)

Lewis Carl Billington (born 17 February 2004) is an English professional footballer plays as a defender for EFL League Two club Crewe Alexandra.

== Career ==
Billington signed a scholarship deal with Crewe Alexandra's Academy in 2020.

He made his Crewe debut on 10 April 2022 in an EFL League One game against Doncaster at Keepmoat Stadium, starting the game at right-back before being replaced by Sean Lawton in stoppage-time. He signed his first professional deal with the club at the end of the 2021–22 season.

In January 2023, Billington joined Leek Town on loan for an initial month, a move that would be later extended until the end of the season. He was then offered a new contract by Crewe, signing a 12-month deal in June 2023. He played in both of Crewe's FA Cup first round matches against League One side Derby County, earning praise for his resilience after an early mistake in the replay on 14 November 2023 - just his sixth first team start.

In January 2024, Billington signed a new contract at Crewe through to the summer of 2025, with a 12-month extension option. Less than 24 hours later, he scored his first Crewe goal in his side's 3–1 win at Barrow on 20 January 2024.

On 14 May 2025, the club announced it had triggered an option to extend his contract. In July 2026, Billington signed a new three-year contract with Crewe.

== Career statistics ==
As of 21 November 2026.

Appearances and goals by club, season and competition
Club	Season	League			FA Cup		League Cup		Other		Total	
Club	Season	Division	Apps	Goals	Apps	Goals	Apps	Goals	Apps	Goals	Apps	Goals
Crewe Alexandra	2021–22	League One	1	0	0	0	0	0	0	0	1	0
Crewe Alexandra	2022–23	League Two	0	0	0	0	0	0	0	0	0	0
Crewe Alexandra	2023–24	League Two	24	1	3	0	1	0	6 (Note: Three appearances in EFL Trophy; three appearances in 2024 EFL play-offs)	0	34	1
Crewe Alexandra	2024–25	League Two	23	0	1	0	0	0	4 (Note: Appearances in EFL Trophy)	0	28	0
Crewe Alexandra	2025–26	League Two	46	0	0	0	1	0	3	0	50	0
Crewe Alexandra	2026–27	League Two	16	0	1	0	2	0	1	0	20	0
Crewe Alexandra	Crewe Alexandra total		110	1	5	0	4	0	14	0	133	1
