= Tom Booth (footballer, born 2004) =

English footballer, born 2004

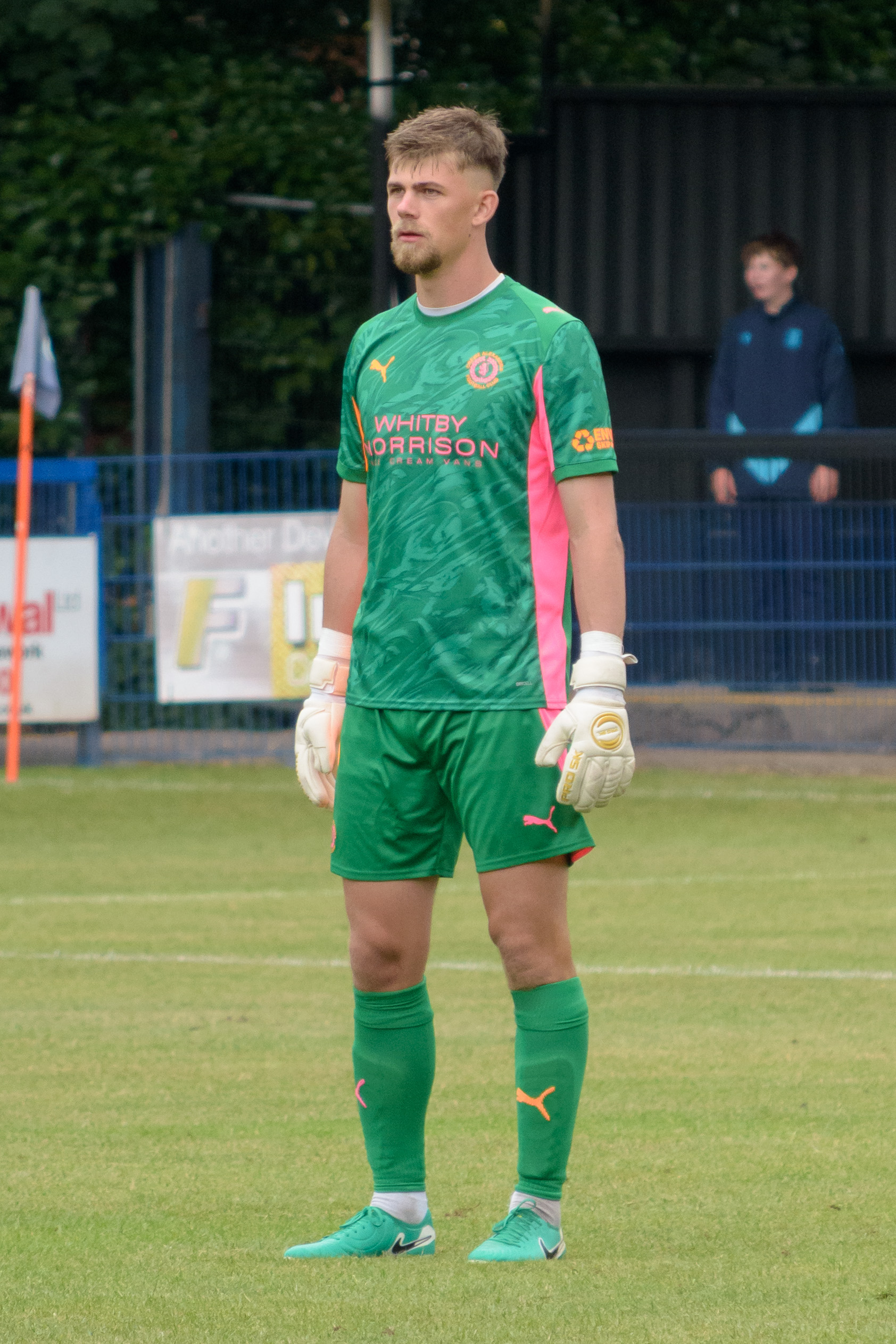
- Booth playing for Crewe Alexandra in 2025

Personal information
- Full name: Thomas Luke Booth
- Date of birth: 2 August 2004 (age 22)
- Place of birth: Crewe, England
- Height: 1.88 m (6 ft 2 in)
- Position: Goalkeeper

Team information
- Current team: Crewe Alexandra
- Number: 1

Youth career
- –2022: Crewe Alexandra

Senior career*
Years	Team	Apps	(Gls)
2022–	Crewe Alexandra	38	(0)
2022	→ Kidsgrove Athletic (loan)	2	(0)
2022	→ Nantwich Town (loan)	13	(0)
2023	→ Nantwich Town (loan)	13	(0)
- * Club domestic league appearances and goals as of 15:47, 27 November 2025 (UTC)

Thomas Luke Booth (born 2 August 2004) is an English professional footballer who plays as a goalkeeper for EFL League Two club Crewe Alexandra.

== Career ==
Having come through the Crewe Alexandra academy system, Booth signed his first professional contract with Crewe Alexandra in 2022. In August 2022, he joined Kidsgrove Athletic on loan for a month, getting sent off in his second appearance against Newcastle Town, before joining Northern Premier League Premier Division side Nantwich Town on loan in October until January 2023. The Nantwich Town loan was subsequently extended to the end of season, but Booth was twice recalled to provide first-team cover following loan goalkeeper changes (on 13 January, he was temporarily recalled for seven days following Arthur Okonkwo's return to Arsenal; in early April, he was finally recalled following an injury to loan keeper James Beadle).

Replacing Dave Richards in the starting line-up for Crewe's final four games of the season, Booth made his first team debut, aged 18, in an EFL League Two match at Grimsby Town on 25 April 2023, which Crewe lost 2–0. He was offered a new contract by the club, and signed a two-year deal in June 2023.

Booth played in nine successive first team games, keeping three clean sheets, from mid-December 2023, but was injured in Crewe's match at Tranmere Rovers on 3 February 2024. After a heavy collision with a Rovers striker, Booth was taken to Arrowe Park Hospital for treatment for a pneumothorax (collapsed lung). After release from hospital on 7 February, he resumed training in mid February and returned to Crewe's starting line-up in March.

In June 2025, Booth signed a two-year contract to stay at Crewe. On 2 August 2025 (his 21st birthday), Booth saved a penalty in Crewe's 3–1 victory at Salford City, the opening game of the side's 2025–26 season.

== Personal life ==
Booth's older brother Sam Booth, formerly at Leek Town, was also a Crewe youth goalkeeper.

== Career statistics ==
As of 22 November 2025

Appearances and goals by club, season and competition
Club	Season	Division	League		FA Cup		League Cup		Other		Total	
Club	Season	Division	Apps	Goals	Apps	Goals	Apps	Goals	Apps	Goals	Apps	Goals
Crewe Alexandra	2022–23	League Two	4	0	0	0	0	0	0	0	4	0
Crewe Alexandra	2023–24	League Two	17	0	0	0	0	0	3 (Note: Appearances in EFL Trophy)	0	20	0
Crewe Alexandra	2024–25	League Two	0	0	0	0	0	0	1	0	1	0
Crewe Alexandra	2025–26	League Two	17	0	0	0	0	0	0	0	17	0
Crewe Alexandra	Total		38	0	0	0	0	0	4	0	42	0
Kidsgrove Athletic (loan)	2022–23	Northern Premier League Division One West	2	0	0	0	—		1 (Note: Appearances in FA Trophy)	0	3	0
Nantwich Town (loan)	2022–23	Northern Premier League Premier Division	26	0	0	0	—		2 (Note: Appearances in Cheshire Senior Cup)	0	28	0
Total			65	0	0	0	0	0	6	0	71	0
