= Connor O'Riordan =

Irish footballer (born 2003)

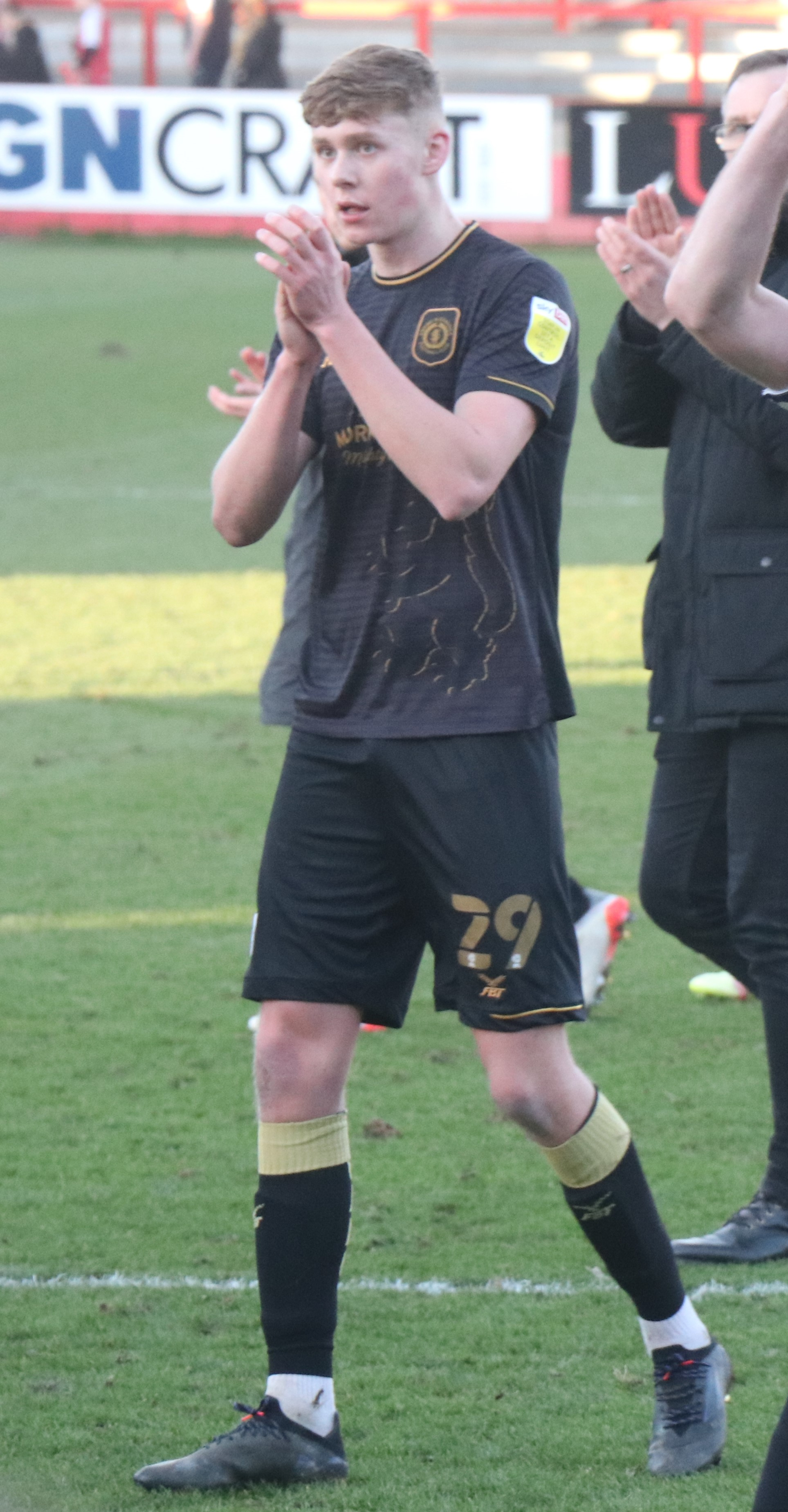
- O'Riordan with Crewe Alexandra in 2022

Personal information
- Full name: Connor Patrick O'Riordan
- Date of birth: 19 October 2003 (age 23)
- Place of birth: Crewe, England
- Height: 6 ft 4 in (1.93 m)
- Position: Centre-back

Team information
- Current team: Barnsley (on loan from Blackburn Rovers)
- Number: 6

Youth career
- –2020: Crewe Alexandra

Senior career*
Years	Team	Apps	(Gls)
2020–2024	Crewe Alexandra	52	(6)
2021	→ Kidsgrove Athletic (loan)	4	(1)
2021	→ Nantwich Town (loan)	1	(0)
2022	→ Raith Rovers (loan)	18	(0)
2024–	Blackburn Rovers	7	(0)
2024–2025	→ Cambridge United (loan)	4	(0)
2025	→ Crewe Alexandra (loan)	20	(3)
2025	→ Doncaster Rovers (loan)	19	(0)
2026–	→ Barnsley (loan)	8	(0)

International career^{‡}
2022	Republic of Ireland U20	1	(0)
2023–2024	Republic of Ireland U21	6	(0)
- * Club domestic league appearances and goals as of 21:04, 20 October 2026 (UTC) ‡ National team caps and goals as of 13:03, 9 September 2024 (UTC)

Connor Patrick O'Riordan (born 19 October 2003) is an Irish professional footballer who plays as a centre-back for EFL League One club Barnsley, on loan from EFL Championship side Blackburn Rovers.

He has been capped for the Republic of Ireland U20 and U21 teams.

== Club career ==
=== Crewe Alexandra ===
O'Riordan signed a scholarship deal with Crewe Alexandra's Academy in 2020.

In September 2021, he joined Kidsgrove Athletic on a month-long loan before having a similar spell at Nantwich Town the following month.

Upon returning to Crewe, he made his Crewe debut on 1 December 2021, being named in the starting line-up for an EFL Trophy knock-out game against Doncaster Rovers at Gresty Road. Still an academy scholar, he made his first league start on 29 January 2022 at Gresty Road against Rotherham United. He signed his first professional deal with the club at the end of the 2021–22 season.

On 5 August 2022, O'Riordan joined Scottish Championship side Raith Rovers on loan until January 2023, making his debut the following day in a 1–0 defeat to Dundee.

In his third game following his January 2023 return to Crewe, O'Riordan scored his first professional goal, in a 1–1 League Two draw with Stockport County on 31 January. On 25 February 2023, he received his first career red card, being sent off after a second caution in the 87th minute of Crewe's 1–1 draw with Rochdale. After suspension, he scored his second Crewe goal in his next game, a 4–3 win over Salford City at Gresty Road on 10 March 2023.

=== Blackburn Rovers ===
On 24 January 2024, O'Riordan joined Blackburn Rovers on a four-and-a-half-year deal, for an undisclosed fee. He made his Blackburn debut as a 68th-minute substitute in the side's 3–1 win over Stoke City on 10 February 2024.

==== Cambridge United (loan) ====
On 12 August 2024, O'Riordan joined Cambridge United on loan for the 2024/25 season. On 9 January 2025, he was recalled from his loan.

==== Crewe Alexandra (loan) ====
On 20 January 2025, O'Riordan returned to Crewe Alexandra on loan for the remainder of the season, and scored his first goal of the loan spell in a 3–0 victory over Barrow at Gresty Road on 22 February 2024.

==== Doncaster Rovers (loan) ====
On 27 June 2025, O'Riordan joined Doncaster Rovers on loan for the season. On 1 January 2026, Grant McCann confirmed that O'Riordan had been recalled by Blackburn Rovers, with the early recall attributed to Blackburn's growing injury crisis.

==== Barnsley (loan) ====
On 27 August 2026, O'Riordan joined Barnsley on a season-long loan with an option for Barnsley to purchase O'Riordan at the end of the deal.

== International career ==
Born in England, he is also eligible to play for Republic of Ireland and Scotland.

O'Riordan was capped at under-20 level for the Republic of Ireland in March 2022. His first call up for the Republic of Ireland U21 team came in March 2023, for a friendly against Iceland U21. He won his first U21 cap, starting against Kuwait, on 19 June 2023.

On 2 October 2023, in an apparent switch of allegiance, Scot Gemmill named O'Riordan in the Scotland U21 squad, but two days later the defender pulled out to represent Ireland instead, and on 5 October was named in the country's U21 squad to play Latvia, gaining a second U21 cap in Ireland's 2–1 victory on 14 October 2023.

== Career statistics ==
As of match played 20 October 2026

Appearances and goals by club, season and competition
Club	Season	League			National cup (Note: Includes FA Cup, Scottish Cup)		League cup (Note: Includes EFL Cup)		Other		Total	
Club	Season	Division	Apps	Goals	Apps	Goals	Apps	Goals	Apps	Goals	Apps	Goals
Crewe Alexandra	2021–22	League One	11	0	0	0	0	0	2 (Note: Appearances in EFL Trophy)	0	13	0
Crewe Alexandra	2022–23	League Two	18	3	0	0	0	0	0	0	18	3
Crewe Alexandra	2023–24	League Two	23	3	1	0	2	0	1	0	27	3
Crewe Alexandra	Total		52	6	1	0	2	0	3	0	58	6
Raith Rovers (loan)	2022–23	Scottish Championship	18	0	1	0	0	0	2 (Note: Appearances in Scottish Challenge Cup)	0	21	0
Blackburn Rovers	2023–24	Championship	2	0	0	0	0	0	0	0	2	0
Blackburn Rovers	2024–25	Championship	0	0	0	0	0	0	0	0	0	0
Blackburn Rovers	2025–26	Championship	5	0	1	0	—		—		6	0
Blackburn Rovers	2026–27	Championship	0	0	0	0	0	0	0	0	0	0
Blackburn Rovers	Total		7	0	1	0	0	0	0	0	8	0
Cambridge United (loan)	2024–25	League One	4	0	0	0	1	0	3	0	8	0
Crewe Alexandra (loan)	2024–25	League Two	20	3	0	0	0	0	0	0	20	3
Doncaster Rovers (loan)	2025–26	League One	19	0	2	0	1	0	1	0	23	0
Barnsley (loan)	2026–27	League One	8	0	0	0	1	0	1	0	10	0
Career total			128	9	5	0	5	0	10	0	148	9
