= 2022–23 Crewe Alexandra F.C. season =

Crewe Alexandra
2022–23 season
- Chairman: Charles Grant
- Manager: Alex Morris (until 4 November); Lee Bell (from 1 December)
- Stadium: Gresty Road
- League Two: 13th
- FA Cup: Eliminated in the second round (vs. Barnsley)
- EFL Cup: Eliminated in the first round (vs. Grimsby Town)
- EFL Trophy: Eliminated in the group stage
Home colours	Away colours	Third colours

The 2022–23 season was the 146th season in the existence of Crewe Alexandra Football Club and the club's first season back in League Two since the 2019–20 season following relegation in the previous season. In addition to the league, they also competed in the 2022–23 FA Cup, the 2022–23 EFL Cup and the 2022–23 EFL Trophy.

== Players ==
As of 29 August 2022

Squad no.	Player	Nationality	Date of birth (age)	Previous club	Joined first team
Goalkeepers
1	Dave Richards	(Wales)	31 December 1993 (age 32)	(England) Bristol City	2015
13	Arthur Okonkwo	(England)	9 September 2001 (age 24)	(England) Arsenal (loan)	2022
31	James Beadle	(England)	16 July 2004 (age 22)	(England) Brighton (loan)	2023
23	Tom Booth	(England)	2 August 2004 (age 22)	Crewe Academy	2022
Defenders
2	Kelvin Mellor	(England)	25 January 1991 (age 35)	(England) Carlisle United	2022
3	Rio Adebisi	(England)	27 September 2000 (age 25)	Crewe Academy	2019
4	Zac Williams	(Wales)	27 March 2004 (age 22)	Crewe Academy	2021
5	Rod McDonald	(England)	11 April 1992 (age 34)	(England) Carlisle United	2022
6	Luke Offord (captain)	(England)	19 November 1999 (age 26)	Crewe Academy	2017
15	Connor O'Riordan	(Republic of Ireland)	19 October 2003 (age 22)	Crewe Academy	2020
22	Billy Sass-Davies	(Wales)	17 February 2000 (age 26)	Crewe Academy	2017
28	Lewis Billington	(England)	17 February 2004 (age 22)	Crewe Academy	2020
29	Sean Lawton	(England)	12 September 2003 (age 22)	Crewe Academy	2020
33	Sean Robertson	(England)	6 June 2001 (age 25)	(England) Forest Green (loan)	2020
Midfielders
8	Conor Thomas	(England)	29 October 1993 (age 32)	(England) Cheltenham Town	2022
10	Callum Ainley	(England)	2 November 1997 (age 28)	Crewe Academy	2015
12	Regan Griffiths	(England)	1 May 2000 (age 26)	Crewe Academy	2018
16	Charlie Colkett	(England)	4 September 1996 (age 29)	(England) Cheltenham Town	2022
18	Ryan Finnigan	(England)	23 September 2003 (age 22)	(England) Southampton (loan)	2023
21	Tariq Uwakwe	(England)	19 November 1999 (age 26)	(England) Chelsea	2022
24	Charlie Finney	(England)	28 October 2003 (age 22)	Crewe Academy	2021
25	Joel Tabiner	(England)	30 November 2003 (age 22)	Crewe Academy	2020
27	Matúš Holíček	(Slovakia)	25 January 2005 (age 21)	Crewe Academy	2022
30	Owen Lunt	(England)	2 September 2004 (age 21)	Crewe Academy	2022
Forwards
7	Chris Long	(England)	25 February 1995 (age 31)	(Scotland) Motherwell	2021
9	Courtney Baker-Richardson	(England)	5 December 1995 (age 30)	(Wales) Newport County	2022
11	Dan Agyei	(England)	1 June 1997 (age 29)	(England) Oxford United	2022
17	Lachlan Brook	(Australia)	8 February 2001 (age 25)	(England) Brentford (loan)	2022
19	Bassala Sambou	(Germany)	15 October 1997 (age 28)	(Netherlands) Fortuna Sittard	2019
26	Connor Evans	(Wales)	27 September 2003 (age 22)	Crewe Academy	2021

== Squad statistics ==
As of 17 October 2022

No.	Pos	Nat	Player	Total		League Two		FA Cup		League Cup		League Trophy	
No.	Pos	Nat	Player	Apps	Goals	Apps	Goals	Apps	Goals	Apps	Goals	Apps	Goals
1	GK	(Wales) WAL	Dave Richards	3	0	0+0	0	0+0	0	0+0	0	3+0	0
2	DF	(England) ENG	Kelvin Mellor	21	1	16+0	1	1+0	0	1+0	0	2+1	0
3	DF	(England) ENG	Rio Adebisi	11	1	6+2	1	1+0	0	0+0	0	2+0	0
4	DF	(Wales) WAL	Zac Williams	16	0	12+1	0	0+0	0	0+1	0	2+0	0
5	DF	(England) ENG	Rod McDonald	13	1	11+0	1	0+0	0	1+0	0	1+0	0
6	DF	(England) ENG	Luke Offord	21	0	17+0	0	1+0	0	1+0	0	1+1	0
7	FW	(England) ENG	Chris Long	1	0	0+1	0	0+0	0	0+0	0	0+0	0
8	MF	(England) ENG	Conor Thomas	19	0	17+0	0	1+0	0	0+0	0	1+0	0
9	FW	(England) ENG	Courtney Baker-Richardson	18	8	11+4	7	0+0	0	1+0	0	2+0	1
10	MF	(England) ENG	Callum Ainley	12	0	10+0	0	0+0	0	0+1	0	0+1	0
11	FW	(England) ENG	Dan Agyei	23	5	17+0	5	2+0	0	0+1	0	1+2	0
12	MF	(England) ENG	Regan Griffiths	5	0	0+2	0	0+0	0	1+0	0	2+0	0
13	GK	(England) ENG	Arthur Okonkwo*	19	0	17+0	0	1+0	0	1+0	0	0+0	0
14	MF	(England) ENG	Oliver Finney	9	0	0+5	0	0+0	0	1+0	0	3+0	0
16	MF	(England) ENG	Charlie Colkett	4	0	0+2	0	0+1	0	1+0	0	0+0	0
17	FW	(Australia) AUS	Lachlan Brook*	14	1	7+4	1	1+0	0	0+0	0	1+1	0
18	MF	(South Africa) RSA	Khanya Leshabela*	13	0	2+8	0	0+0	0	1+0	0	2+0	0
19	FW	(Germany) GER	Bassala Sambou	19	1	10+4	0	1+0	1	0+1	0	2+1	0
20	MF	(Wales) WAL	Eli King*	13	0	8+3	0	0+0	0	0+0	0	0+2	0
21	MF	(England) ENG	Tariq Uwakwe	19	0	16+0	0	1+0	0	0+1	0	0+1	0
22	DF	(Wales) WAL	Billy Sass-Davies	9	0	3+3	0	1+0	0	0+0	0	2+0	0
24	MF	(England) ENG	Charlie Finney	5	0	0+3	0	0+0	0	1+0	0	1+0	0
25	MF	(England) ENG	Joel Tabiner	10	0	5+1	0	1+0	0	1+0	0	2+0	0

=== Goals record ===
As of 8 October 2022

Rank	No.	Nat.	Po.	Name	League Two	FA Cup	League Cup	League Trophy	Total
1	11	(England)	CF	Dan Agyei	16	0	0	0	14
2	9	(England)	CF	Courtney Baker-Richardson	8	0	0	1	9
3	15	(Republic of Ireland)	CB	Connor O'Riordan	3	0	0	0	3
4	2	(England)	RB	Kelvin Mellor	2	0	0	0	2
4	3	(England)	LB	Rio Adebisi	2	0	0	0	2
4	17	(Australia)	RW	Lachlan Brook	2	0	0	0	2
4	10	(England)	CAM	Callum Ainley	2	0	0	0	2
5	5	(England)	CB	Rod McDonald	1	0	0	0	1
5	16	(England)	CM	Charlie Colkett	1	0	0	0	1
5	18	(England)	CM	Ryan Finnigan	1	0	0	0	1
5	25	(England)	CM	Joel Tabiner	1	0	0	0	1
5	21	(England)	CM	Tariq Uwakwe	1	0	0	0	1
5	7	(England)	ST	Chris Long	1	0	0	0	1
5	19	(Germany)	ST	Bassala Sambou	0	1	0	0	1
Total					39	1	0	1	41

=== Disciplinary record ===
As of 8 October 2022

Rank	No.	Nat.	Po.	Name	League Two			FA Cup			League Cup			League Trophy			Total		
Rank	No.	Nat.	Po.	Name	Booked	(yellow card) (yellow-red card)	Sent off (straight red)	Booked	(yellow card) (yellow-red card)	Sent off (straight red)	Booked	(yellow card) (yellow-red card)	Sent off (straight red)	Booked	(yellow card) (yellow-red card)	Sent off (straight red)	Booked	(yellow card) (yellow-red card)	Sent off (straight red)
1	2	(England)	RB	Kelvin Mellor	2	0	0	0	0	0	1	0	0	0	0	0	3	0	0
1	9	(England)	CF	Courtney Baker-Richardson	3	0	0	0	0	0	0	0	0	0	0	0	3	0	0
1	20	(Wales)	CM	Eli King	3	0	0	0	0	0	0	0	0	0	0	0	3	0	0
4	4	(Wales)	CB	Zac Williams	2	0	0	0	0	0	0	0	0	0	0	0	2	0	0
4	8	(England)	DM	Conor Thomas	2	0	0	0	0	0	0	0	0	0	0	0	2	0	0
4	11	(England)	CF	Dan Agyei	2	0	0	0	0	0	0	0	0	0	0	0	2	0	0
4	19	(Germany)	CF	Bassala Sambou	1	0	1	0	0	0	0	0	0	0	0	0	1	0	1
4	21	(England)	CM	Tariq Uwakwe	2	0	0	0	0	0	0	0	0	0	0	0	2	0	0
8	3	(England)	LB	Rio Adebisi	1	0	0	0	0	0	0	0	0	0	0	0	1	0	0
8	5	(England)	CB	Rod McDonald	1	0	0	0	0	0	0	0	0	0	0	0	1	0	0
8	13	(England)	GK	Arthur Okonkwo	1	0	0	0	0	0	0	0	0	0	0	0	1	0	0
8	16	(England)	CM	Charlie Colkett	1	0	0	0	0	0	0	0	0	0	0	0	1	0	0
8	18	(South Africa)	CM	Khanya Leshabela	1	0	0	0	0	0	0	0	0	0	0	0	1	0	0
8	25	(England)	MF	Joel Tabiner	1	0	0	0	0	0	0	0	0	0	0	0	1	0	0
Total					23	0	1	0	0	0	1	0	0	0	0	0	24	0	1

== Transfers ==
=== In ===
Date	Pos	Player	Transferred from	Fee	Ref
1 July 2022 (Note: The transfer was announced on 31 May, and would become official on July 1, once his Newport County contract expired)	CF	(England) Courtney Baker-Richardson	(Wales) Newport County	Free transfer	
1 July 2022 (Note: The transfer was announced on 14 June, and would become official on July 1, once his Cheltenham Town contract expired)	CM	(England) Charlie Colkett	(England) Cheltenham Town	Free transfer	
1 July 2022 (Note: The transfer was announced on 28 June, and would become official on July 1, once his Carlisle United contract expired)	CB	(England) Rod McDonald	(England) Carlisle United	Free transfer	
1 July 2022 (Note: The transfer was announced on 20 May, and would become official on July 1, once his Carlisle United contract expired)	RB	(England) Kelvin Mellor	(England) Carlisle United	Free transfer	
1 July 2022 (Note: The transfer was announced on 19 May, and would become official on July 1, once his Cheltenham Town contract expired)	DM	(England) Conor Thomas	(England) Cheltenham Town	Free transfer	
11 January 2023	CF	(England) Elliott Nevitt	(England) Tranmere Rovers	Undisclosed	
19 January 2023	RW	(England) David Amoo	(England) Stevenage	Undisclosed	

=== Out ===
Date	Pos	Player	Transferred to	Fee	Ref
23 June 2022	CM	(Spain) Madger Gomes	Unattached	Mutual consent	
30 June 2022	GK	(England) Sam Booth	(England) Kidsgrove Athletic	Released	
30 June 2022	GK	(Finland) Will Jääskeläinen	(England) AFC Wimbledon	Released	
30 June 2022	RB	(England) Travis Johnson	(England) Crawley Town	Withdrew contract offer	
30 June 2022	RW	(England) Scott Kashket	(England) Gillingham	Released	
30 June 2022	CF	(France) Mikael Mandron	(England) Gillingham	Rejected contract	
30 June 2022	CM	(England) Luke Murphy	(England) Macclesfield	Released	
30 June 2022	CF	(England) Tyreece Onyeka	(England) Stafford Rangers	Released	
30 June 2022	CF	(England) Chris Porter	(England) Oldham Athletic	Mutual consent	
30 June 2022	CM	(England) Joe Robbins	(England) Bamber Bridge	Released	
30 June 2022	LB	(England) Nathan Woodthorpe	(England) Lancaster City	Released	
1 July 2022 (Note: The transfer was announced on 28 May, and would become official on July 1 once the transfer window opened)	CM	(England) Josh Lundstram	(England) Altrincham	Undisclosed	
5 August 2022	CM	(England) Tom Lowery	(England) Portsmouth	Free Transfer	
31 January 2023	CM	(England) Oliver Finney	(England) Hartlepool United	Free Transfer	

=== Loans in ===
Date	Pos	Player	Loaned from	On loan until	Ref
22 July 2022	RW	(Australia) Lachlan Brook	(England) Brentford	End of Season (Note: On 4 January, Brook's loan from Brentford was extended until end of the season.)	
26 July 2022	CM	(South Africa) Khanya Leshabela	(England) Leicester City	31 January 2023	
29 July 2022	GK	(England) Arthur Okonkwo	(England) Arsenal	13 January 2023 (Note: Originally on a season-long loan, Okonkwo was recalled by Arsenal on 13 January 2023.)	
25 August 2022	CM	(Wales) Eli King	(Wales) Cardiff City	January 2023	
18 January 2023	GK	(England) James Beadle	(England) Brighton & Hove Albion	19 April 2023 (Note: Originally on loan to the end of the season, Beadle returned to Brighton after sustaining an ankle injury on 10 April.)	
18 January 2023	CM	(England) Ryan Finnigan	(England) Southampton	End of Season	
31 January 2023	RB	(England) Sean Robertson	(England) Forest Green Rovers	End of Season	

=== Loans out ===
Date	Pos	Player	Loaned to	On loan until	Ref
5 August 2022	CB	(England) Connor O'Riordan	(Scotland) Raith Rovers	1 January 2023	
August 2022	CB	(England) Sean Lawton	(England) Nantwich Town	24 February 2023 (Note: On 18 September, Lawton's loan at Nantwich was extended by a further month. On 18 January, it was extended until the end of the season. On 24 February he returned to Crewe due to the two-player loan rule.)	
29 August 2022	GK	(England) Tom Booth	(England) Kidsgrove Athletic	29 September 2022	
7 October 2022	CF	(Wales) Connor Evans	(England) Marine	7 November 2022	
17 October 2022	GK	(England) Tom Booth	(England) Nantwich Town	11 April 2023 (Note: On 7 January, Booth's loan at Nantwich was extended until the end of the season. On 13 January, he was temporarily recalled by Crewe (for seven days) following Okonkwo's recall by Arsenal. In April, he was recalled by Crewe following an injury to loan keeper James Beadle.)	
2 January 2023	CB	(England) Lewis Billington	(England) Leek Town	End of Season (Note: On 27 February, Billington's loan at Leek was extended until the season end.)	
24 February 2023	CF	(Wales) Connor Evans	(England) Nantwich Town	End of Season	
4 March 2023	LB	(England) Charlie Finney	(England) Chorley	1 April 2023	
4 March 2023	CB	(Wales) Billy Sass-Davies	(England) Woking	1 April 2023	
17 March 2023	CF	(Germany) Bassala Sambou	(England) Oldham Athletic	End of Season	
24 March 2023	LB	(England) Sean Lawton	(England) Hereford	End of Season	

== Pre-season and friendlies ==
On 18 May 2022, Crewe announced their finalised pre-season schedule with away trips to Nantwich Town, Macclesfield, Kidsgrove Athletic, Barnsley and Halesowen Town followed by a home game against West Bromwich Albion. A further home friendly with Rotherham United (for 23 July 2022) was also noted, though the match was later removed from the original press release. On 25 July 2022, a trip for an XI side to Whitchurch Alport was confirmed.

Win Draw Loss Fixtures

2 July 2022 Friendly	Nantwich Town	0–3	Crewe Alexandra	Nantwich
15:00 BST		Report	Butler 4' (o.g.); Wilson 45+5'; Sambou 85'	Stadium: Weaver Stadium

5 July 2022 Friendly	Macclesfield	2–1	Crewe Alexandra	Macclesfield
19:45 BST	Berry 37'; Owens 90+6'	Report	Woodcock 62'	Stadium: Leasing.com Stadium

6 July 2022 Friendly	Kidsgrove Athletic	0–6	Crewe Alexandra	Kidsgrove
19:30 BST		Report	Agyei 12'; Baker-Richardson 30', 50'; Ainley 40', 55'; McDonald 60'	Stadium: Hollinwood Road

9 July 2022 Friendly	Barnsley	0–0	Crewe Alexandra	Barnsley
15:00 BST		Report		Stadium: Barnsley F.C. Training Ground; Attendance: 0 (behind-closed-doors)

12 July 2022 Friendly	Halesowen Town	2–3	Crewe Alexandra	Halesowen
19:45 BST	Cobourne 1'; Gregory 38'	Report	Sang 33'; Holíček 45'; Tabiner 86'	Stadium: The Grove

16 July 2022 Friendly	Crewe Alexandra	1–1	West Bromwich Albion	Crewe
15:00 BST	Agyei 73'	Report	Swift 54'	Stadium: Mornflake Stadium

23 July 2022 Friendly	Crewe Alexandra	1–2	Rotherham United	Crewe
15:00 BST	Agyei 40'	Report	Washington 1'; Kelly 39'	Stadium: Mornflake Stadium

26 July 2022 Friendly	Whitchurch Alport	0–0	Crewe Alexandra XI	Whitchurch
19:30 BST				Stadium: KMJ Mortgages Stadium

=== Mid-season ===
During the season, Crewe announced they would face Brentford B in a behind-closed-doors friendly.

15 October 2022 Friendly	Crewe Alexandra	1-5	Brentford B	TBA
TBA BST				Stadium: TBA

== Competitions ==
=== Overall record ===
Competition	First match	Last match	Starting round	Record							
Competition	First match	Last match	Starting round	Pld	W	D	L	GF	GA	GD	Win %
League Two	30 July 2022	8 May 2023	Matchday 1	46	14	16	16	48	60	−12	30.43
FA Cup	5 November 2022	3 June 2023	First round	2	1	0	1	1	3	−2	50.00
EFL Cup	9 August 2022	26 February 2023	First round	1	0	0	1	0	4	−4	0.00
EFL Trophy	30 August 2022	2 April 2023	Group stage	3	1	0	2	1	5	−4	33.33
Total				52	16	16	20	50	72	−22	30.77

Last updated: 12 May 2023
Source: [ Soccerway]

=== League Two ===
==== League table ====
Pos	Team	Pld	W	D	L	GF	GA	GD	Pts
10	Swindon Town	46	16	13	17	61	55	+6	61
11	Grimsby Town	46	16	13	17	49	56	−7	61
12	Tranmere Rovers	46	15	13	18	45	48	−3	58
13	Crewe Alexandra	46	14	16	16	48	60	−12	58
14	Sutton United	46	15	13	18	46	58	−12	58
15	Newport County	46	14	15	17	53	56	−3	57
16	Walsall	46	12	19	15	46	49	−3	55

Source: EFL Official Website
Rules for classification: 1) Points; 2) Goal difference; 3) Number of goals scored; 4) Head-to-head results; 5) Wins; 6) Away goals; 7) Penalty points (sec 9.5); 8) 12-point sending off offences

==== Results summary ====
Overall								Home						Away					
Pld	W	D	L	GF	GA	GD	Pts	W	D	L	GF	GA	GD	W	D	L	GF	GA	GD
46	14	16	16	48	60	−12	58	11	6	6	32	26	+6	3	10	10	16	34	−18

Last updated: 8 May 2023.
Source: [ Soccerway]

==== Results by round ====
Round	1	2	3	4	5	6	7	8	9	10	11	12	13	14	15	16	17	18	19	20	21	22	23	24	25	26	27	28	29	30	31	32	33	34	35	36	37	38	39	40	41	42	43	44	45	46
Ground	A	H	A	H	H	A	H	A	H	H	A	H	A	H	A	A	H	A	H	A	H	H	H	A	H	H	H	A	H	A	A	H	A	H	A	A	A	A	H	A	H	A	A	H	H	A
Result	W	W	L	W	D	D	L	D	W	L	D	D	L	D	D	L	W	W	L	L	L	W	D	D	D	L	L	D	W	D	D	D	D	W	L	L	L	W	W	L	W	L	L	W	W	D
Position	8	2	7	6	7	7	10	10	9	9	12	13	13	13	14	16	16	15	15	17	17	17	17	17	16	18	18	19	17	17	18	17	16	16	17	18	18	17	16	16	16	18	18	16	13	13

Updated to match(es) played on 8 May 2023. Source: [ Soccerway]
A = Away; H = Home; W = Win; D = Draw; L = Loss; P = Postponed

==== Matches ====
Win Draw Loss Fixtures

On 23 June, the league fixtures were announced.

30 July 2022 1	Rochdale	1–2	Crewe Alexandra	Spotland
15:00 BST	Ebanks-Landell (yellow card) 13'; Ball (yellow card) 51'; Rodney 69'	Report	Williams (yellow card) 10'; Agyei 14'; Brook 22'; Offord (yellow card) 60'	Stadium: Crown Oil Arena; Attendance: 3,648; Referee: Andrew Kitchen

6 August 2022 2	Crewe Alexandra	3–0	Harrogate Town	Crewe
15:00 BST	Agyei 44'; Mellor 45+3'; Sambou (yellow card) 65'; Baker-Richardson 77'; Uwakwe (yellow card) 81'	Report		Stadium: Mornflake Stadium; Attendance: 3,881; Referee: Declan Bourne

13 August 2022 3	Salford City	3–0	Crewe Alexandra	Salford
15:00 BST	Nartey (yellow card) 14'; McAleny 17'; Watt (yellow card) 44'; Thomas-Asante 50', 53'	Report	Mellor (yellow card) 29'; Sambou (red card) 31'; Baker-Richardson (yellow card) 90+2'	Stadium: Moor Lane; Attendance: 2,119; Referee: Craig Hicks

16 August 2022 4	Crewe Alexandra	1–0	Sutton United	Crewe
19:45 BST	Baker-Richardson 12'; Uwakwe (yellow card) 87'	Report	Eastmond (yellow card) 38'; Beautyman (yellow card) 58'	Stadium: Mornflake Stadium; Attendance: 3,452; Referee: Thomas Parsons

20 August 2022 5	Crewe Alexandra	2–2	Northampton Town	Crewe
15:00 BST	Baker-Richardson 26', 41'; Mellor (yellow card) 63'; Agyei (yellow card) 90+5'	Report	Hoskins 43', 90+7'; McWilliams (yellow card) 83'; Burge (yellow card) 90+5'	Stadium: Mornflake Stadium; Attendance: 4,071; Referee: David Webb

27 August 2022 6	Bradford City	0–0	Crewe Alexandra	Bradford
15:00 BST	Banks (yellow card) 30'; Halliday (yellow card) 65'	Report		Stadium: University of Bradford Stadium; Attendance: 16,541; Referee: Sunny Gill

3 September 2022 7	Crewe Alexandra	1–2	Stevenage	Crewe
15:00 BST	Thomas (penalty missed) 19', (yellow card) 76'; McDonald 27'; King (yellow card) 41'; Baker-Richardson (yellow card) 82'	Report	Sweeney (yellow card) 37'; Reid 48', 67'; Reeves (yellow card) 85'	Stadium: Mornflake Stadium; Attendance: 3,669; Referee: Tom Nield

10 September 2022	Grimsby Town	Postponed	Crewe Alexandra	Cleethorpes
15:00 BST				Stadium: Blundell Park
Note: Fixture was postponed as a mark of respect following the passing of Queen Elizabeth II.

13 September 2022 8	Hartlepool United	1–1	Crewe Alexandra	Hartlepool
19:45 BST	Umerah 33' (pen.)	Report	Agyei 86'; King (yellow card) 90+3'	Stadium: Suit Direct Stadium; Attendance: 4,002; Referee: Martin Coy

17 September 2022 9	Crewe Alexandra	1–0	Crawley Town	Crewe
15:00 BST	Baker-Richardson (yellow card) 38', (goal) 73'; Thomas (yellow card) 86'	Report		Stadium: Mornflake Stadium; Attendance: 3,717; Referee: Rebecca Welch

24 September 2022 10	Crewe Alexandra	1–2	Mansfield Town	Crewe
15:00 BST	Leshabela (yellow card) 33'; Baker-Richardson 70'; Sambou (yellow card) 79'	Report	Clarke (yellow card) 38'; Quinn (yellow card) 64'; Swan 87'; Hawkins 90+3'	Stadium: Mornflake Stadium; Attendance: 4,942; Referee: Martin Woods

1 October 2022 11	Carlisle United	0–0	Crewe Alexandra	Carlisle
15:00 BST	Huntington (yellow card) 60'	Report	Agyei (yellow card) 30'; Williams (yellow card) 35'; King (yellow card) 65'	Stadium: Brunton Park; Attendance: 5,012; Referee: Ross Joyce

8 October 2022 12	Crewe Alexandra	1–1	Gillingham	Crewe
15:00 BST	Agyei 19'; Adebisi (yellow card) 21'; Tabiner (yellow card) 90+2'	Report	Kashket 12'	Stadium: Mornflake Stadium; Attendance: 3,809; Referee: Bobby Madden

14 October 2022 13	Tranmere Rovers	3–0	Crewe Alexandra	Birkenhead
19:45 BST	Simeu 22'; Merrie (yellow card) 52'; Nevitt 56' 90'	Report		Stadium: Prenton Park; Attendance: 8,001; Referee: Simon Mather

22 October 2022 14	Crewe Alexandra	1–1	Doncaster Rovers	Crewe
15:00 BST	Baker-Richardson 14' (yellow card) 45'; Offord (yellow card) 72'; Brook (yellow card) 83'	Report	Miller (penalty missed) 45+1' 77'	Stadium: Mornflake Stadium; Attendance: 4,099; Referee: Carl Brook

25 October 2022 15	AFC Wimbledon	1–1	Crewe Alexandra	Wimbledon
19:45 BST	Assal 45+1'; Chislett (yellow card) 53'; Davison (penalty missed) 75'	Report	Thomas (yellow card) 24'; Mellor (yellow card) 39'; Williams (yellow card) 53'; Adebisi 62'; Tabiner (yellow card) 70'; Offord (yellow card) 88'	Stadium: The Cherry Red Records Stadium; Attendance: 6,984; Referee: Lee Swabey

29 October 2022 16	Barrow	3–0	Crewe Alexandra	Barrow-in-Furness
15:00 BST	Waters 8'; Gordon 43', 60' (yellow card) 67'; Stevens (yellow card) 90'; Kenlock (yellow card) 90+2'	Report	Williams (yellow card) 66'; Sambou (yellow card) 72'	Stadium: Furness Building Society Stadium; Attendance: 3,167; Referee: Marc Edwards

12 November 2022 17	Crewe Alexandra	1–0	Colchester United	Crewe
15:00 GMT	Offord (yellow card) 34'; Agyei 80'; Uwakwe (yellow card) 90+2'	Report	Ashley (yellow card) 10'; Nouble (yellow card) 66'; Hannant (yellow card) 72'	Stadium: Mornflake Stadium; Attendance: 3,814; Referee: Thomas Parsons

19 November 2022 18	Swindon Town	0–1	Crewe Alexandra	Swindon
15:00 GMT	Brennan (yellow card) 40'; Iandolo (yellow card) 90+2'	Report	Agyei 23' (pen.); King (yellow card) 30'	Stadium: The County Ground; Attendance: 8,734; Referee: Andrew Kitchen

2 December 2022 19	Crewe Alexandra	1–2	Newport County	Crewe
19:45 GMT	Brook 13'; McDonald (yellow card) 84'; Offord (yellow card) 87'	Report	Drysdale (yellow card) 15'; Evans (yellow card) 45+2'; Norman 62'; Zanzala 85'; Demetriou (yellow card) 88'	Stadium: Mornflake Stadium; Attendance: 3,065; Referee: Rebecca Welch

10 December 2022	Crewe Alexandra	Postponed	Leyton Orient	Crewe
15:00 GMT				Stadium: Mornflake Stadium
Note: Fixture was postponed due to a frozen pitch.

17 December 2022	Walsall	Postponed	Crewe Alexandra	Bescot
15:00 GMT				Stadium: Poundland Bescot Stadium
Note: Fixture was postponed due to a frozen pitch.

26 December 2022 20	Stockport County	2–0	Crewe Alexandra	Edgeley
15:00 GMT	Madden 55'; Collar 68'	Report	Thomas (yellow card) 52'	Stadium: Edgeley Park; Attendance: 9,837; Referee: Martin Woods

29 December 2022 21	Crewe Alexandra	0–3	Carlisle United	Crewe
19:45 GMT	Mellor (yellow card) 49'; Offord (red card) 51'	Report	Feeney 6', (yellow card) 26'; Moxon 46'; Dennis 72'	Stadium: Mornflake Stadium; Attendance: 4,493; Referee: Andy Haines

1 January 2023 22	Crewe Alexandra	1–0	Tranmere Rovers	Crewe
15:00 GMT	Agyei (yellow card) 24'; Colkett 34'	Report	Davies (yellow card) 72'	Stadium: Mornflake Stadium; Attendance: 5,349; Referee: Andy Woolmer

7 January 2023 23	Crewe Alexandra	0–0	AFC Wimbledon	Crewe
15:00 GMT	Brook (yellow card) 72'	Report	Brown (yellow card) 73'; Marsh (yellow card) 84'	Stadium: Mornflake Stadium; Attendance: 4,379; Referee: Christopher Pollard

14 January 2023 24	Mansfield Town	1–1	Crewe Alexandra	Mansfield
15:00 GMT	Maris 42', (red card) 81'; Oates (yellow card) 60'; Wallace (yellow card) 70'	Report	Thomas (yellow card) 27'; Mellor 55'	Stadium: One Call Stadium; Attendance: 6,142; Referee: Carl Boyeson

21 January 2023	Crewe Alexandra	Postponed	Stockport County	Crewe
15:00 GMT				Stadium: Mornflake Stadium
Note: Fixture was postponed due to a hard playing surface.

31 January 2023 25	Crewe Alexandra	1–1	Stockport County	Crewe
19:45 GMT	O'Riordan 44'	Report	Wootton 48'; Rydel (yellow card) 84'; Byrne (yellow card) 86'	Stadium: Mornflake Stadium; Attendance: 5,877; Referee: Tom Reeves

4 February 2023 26	Crewe Alexandra	0–3	Grimsby Town	Crewe
15:00 GMT		Report	McAtee 3'; Lloyd 31'; Green (yellow card) 73'; Dickson-Peters 84'	Stadium: Mornflake Stadium; Attendance: 4,460; Referee: Paul Howard

7 February 2023 27	Crewe Alexandra	0–2	Leyton Orient	Crewe
19:45 GMT	Nevitt (yellow card) 90+2'	Report	Turns 31'; Archibald 59'	Stadium: Mornflake Stadium; Attendance: 3,462; Referee: Sam Allison

11 February 2023 28	Crawley Town	2–2	Crewe Alexandra	Crawley
15:00 GMT	Telford (yellow card) 6'; Francillette (yellow card) 13'; Offord 19' (o.g.); Gladwin 90+7'	Report	Robertson (yellow card) 15' (yellow-red card) 85'; Agyei 51', 61' (pen.), (yellow card) 74'; McDonald (yellow card) 90+2'	Stadium: Broadfield Stadium; Attendance: 2,589; Referee: Charles Breakspear

14 February 2023 29	Crewe Alexandra	2–0	Hartlepool United	Crewe
19:45 GMT	Ainley 31'; Finnigan 39'	Report	Sterry (red card) 13'; Jennings (yellow card) 58'; Niang (yellow card) 67'	Stadium: Mornflake Stadium; Attendance: 3,110 (107 away); Referee: Neil Hair

18 February 2023 30	Harrogate Town	2–2	Crewe Alexandra	Harrogate
15:00 GMT	Muldoon 34'; Olaigbe 52'	Report	Adebisi (yellow card) 61'; Finnigan (yellow card) 73'; Agyei 83' (pen.); Uwakwe 89'	Stadium: The EnviroVent Stadium; Attendance: 2,607 (590 away); Referee: Lewis Smith

21 February 2023 31	Walsall	0–0	Crewe Alexandra	Bescot
19:45 GMT	Knowles (yellow card) 45+4'; Comley (yellow card) 89'	Report	Offord (yellow card) 34'; Robertson (yellow card) 68'; Finnigan (yellow card) 90+4'	Stadium: Poundland Bescot Stadium; Attendance: 5,071 (301 away); Referee: David Rock

25 February 2023 32	Crewe Alexandra	1–1	Rochdale	Crewe
15:00 GMT	Robertson (yellow card) 11'; O'Riordan (yellow card) 14' (yellow-red card) 87'; Adebisi 70'	Report	Odoh (yellow card) 24'; Keohane 80'	Stadium: Mornflake Stadium; Attendance: 4,387 (481 away); Referee: Ben Toner

5 March 2023 33	Sutton United	1–1	Crewe Alexandra	Sutton
15:00 GMT	Eastmond (yellow card) 82'; Rowe 90+3'	Report	Tabiner (yellow card) 20'; Agyei 33'; Finnigan (yellow card) 35'; McDonald (red card) 63'	Stadium: VBS Community Stadium; Attendance: 3,954; Referee: Daniel Middleton

10 March 2023 34	Crewe Alexandra	4–3	Salford City	Crewe
19:45 GMT	Agyei 31' (pen.), 90', (yellow card) 90'; Tabiner 40'; O'Riordan 87', (yellow card) 89'; Finnigan (yellow card) 90+7'	Report	Barry 19'; Hendry 45'; Mallan 85'	Stadium: Mornflake Stadium; Attendance: 4,301; Referee: Ben Speedie

14 March 2023 35	Stevenage	1–0	Crewe Alexandra	Stevenage
19:45 GMT	Reeves (yellow card) 52'; Reid 79'; Rose (yellow card) 85'	Report		Stadium: The Lamex Stadium; Attendance: 2,670 (132 away); Referee: Alan Young

18 March 2023 36	Northampton Town	1–0	Crewe Alexandra	Northampton
15:00 GMT	Appéré 23'; Hondermarck (yellow card) 89'	Report		Stadium: Sixfields Stadium; Attendance: 5,673 (248 away); Referee: Andrew Kitchen

21 March 2023 37	Gillingham	2–1	Crewe Alexandra	Gillingham
19:45 GMT	MacDonald (yellow card) 11'; Nichols 56'; O'Brien 70'; Ehmer (yellow card) 90+5'	Report	Griffiths (yellow card) 42'; Ainley 62'	Stadium: MEMS Priestfield Stadium; Attendance: 5,796 (72 away); Referee: James Oldham

25 March 2023	Crewe Alexandra	Postponed	Bradford City	Crewe
15:00 GMT				Stadium: Mornflake Stadium
Note: Fixture was postponed due to international call-ups within the squad.

1 April 2023 38	Doncaster Rovers	0–2	Crewe Alexandra	Doncaster
15:00 BST		Report	Baker-Richardson 31'; O'Riordan 37'	Stadium: The Eco-Power Stadium; Attendance: 5,993; Referee: Ross Joyce

7 April 2023 39	Crewe Alexandra	3–0	Barrow	Crewe
15:00 BST	Agyei 14' (pen.), 33' (pen.), (yellow card) 52'; O'Riordan (yellow card) 37'; Thomas (yellow card) 45'; Adebisi (yellow card) 79'; Long (yellow card) 88' (goal) 89'	Report	Ray (yellow card) 13'; Warren (yellow card) 43'	Stadium: Mornflake Stadium; Attendance: 4,821; Referee: Sam Purkiss

10 April 2023 40	Colchester United	4–0	Crewe Alexandra	Colchester
15:00 BST	Akinde 24', 28'; Kelleher (yellow card) 30'; Chilvers 40'; Tovide 55'	Report	Tabiner (yellow card) 10'; Adebisi (yellow card) 39'	Stadium: JobServe Community Stadium; Attendance: 4,158 (188 away); Referee: Will Finnie

15 April 2023 41	Crewe Alexandra	2–0	Walsall	Crewe
15:00 BST	McDonald 2', (yellow card) 79'; Long 25'; Mellor (yellow card) 67'	Report	Labadie (yellow card) 49' (yellow-red card) 61'; Knowles (yellow card) 82'; McEntee (yellow card) 90'	Stadium: Mornflake Stadium; Attendance: 4,857 (1,010 away); Referee: Carl Boyeson

22 April 2023 42	Leyton Orient	2–0	Crewe Alexandra	Leyton
15:00 BST	El Mizouni (yellow card) 27'; Moncur 51' (pen.); Kelman 77'	Report	Thomas (yellow card) 58'; Griffiths (yellow card) 80'	Stadium: Brisbane Road; Attendance: 8,311; Referee: Sam Allison

25 April 2023 43	Grimsby Town	2–0	Crewe Alexandra	Cleethorpes
19:45 BST	Holohan 13'; Khan (yellow card) 77'; Orsi 82'	Report	Mellor (yellow card) 17'	Stadium: Blundell Park; Attendance: 4,482 (63 away); Referee: Darren Handley

29 April 2023 44	Crewe Alexandra	2–1	Swindon Town	Crewe
15:00 BST	O'Riordan (yellow card) 41'; Long (yellow card) 70'; Thomas 82'; Tabiner 86'	Report	Hepburn-Murphy 44'; Minturn (yellow card) 65'	Stadium: Mornflake Stadium; Attendance: 4,694; Referee: Ruebyn Ricardo

3 May 2023 45	Crewe Alexandra	3–2	Bradford City	Crewe
19:45 BST	Williams (yellow card) 15'; Agyei 16', 43', (yellow card) 86'; Baker-Richardson (yellow card) 90+9'; Long 90+11'	Report	Crichlow (yellow card) 8'; Cook 46'; Walker 55'; Banks (yellow card) 78'	Stadium: Mornflake Stadium; Attendance: 6,123 (2,314 away); Referee: Adam Herczeg

8 May 2023 46	Newport County	2–2	Crewe Alexandra	Newport
12:30 BST (UTC+1)	Bogle 77'; Bogle 90+1'	Report	Adebisi 56'; Brook 90+3'	Stadium: Rodney Parade; Attendance: 4,195; Referee: Anthony Backhouse

=== FA Cup ===
The Alex were drawn at home to Leyton Orient in the first round and away to Barnsley in the second round.

Win Draw Loss Fixtures

5 November 2022 First round	Crewe Alexandra	1–0	Leyton Orient	Crewe
15:00 GMT	Thomas (yellow card) 31'; Sambou 90+2'	Report	Ogie (yellow card) 60'; Clay (red card) 87'	Stadium: Mornflake Stadium; Attendance: 2,104; Referee: Sam Purkiss

26 November 2022 Second round	Barnsley	3–0	Crewe Alexandra	Barnsley
15:00 GMT	Cole 30'; Phillips 50'; Andersen (yellow card) 53'; Benson 57' (pen.)	Report	Sambou (yellow card) 50'	Stadium: Oakwell Stadium; Attendance: 3,967; Referee: Tom Reeves

=== EFL Cup ===
Win Draw Loss Fixtures

Crewe were drawn away to Grimsby Town in the first round.

9 August 2022 First round	Grimsby Town	4–0	Crewe Alexandra	Cleethorpes
19:45 BST	Amos (yellow card) 3'; Waterfall 13'; Green 34'; Smith 56'; Wearne 86'	Report	Mellor (yellow card) 65'	Stadium: Blundell Park; Attendance: 2,802; Referee: Adam Herczeg

=== EFL Trophy ===
On 20 June, the initial Group stage draw was made, grouping Crewe Alexandra with Bolton Wanderers and Tranmere Rovers. Three days later, Leeds United U21s joined Northern Group B.

Pos	Div	Team	Pld	W	PW	PL	L	GF	GA	GD	Pts	Qualification
1	L1	Bolton Wanderers	3	2	0	1	0	9	3	+6	7	Advance to Round 2
2	L2	Tranmere Rovers	3	1	1	0	1	6	7	−1	5	Advance to Round 2
3	ACA	Leeds United U21	3	1	0	1	1	5	6	−1	4	
4	L2	Crewe Alexandra	3	0	1	0	2	1	5	−4	2	

Source: EFL.com

Win Draw Loss Fixtures

30 August 2022 Group stage	Bolton Wanderers	4–1	Crewe Alexandra	Horwich
19:00 BST	Bakayoko 5'; Aimson (yellow card) 26'; Charles 78', 89'; Sadlier 86'	Report	Baker-Richardson 16'	Stadium: University of Bolton Stadium; Attendance: 2,115; Referee: Scott Oldham

20 September 2022 Group stage	Crewe Alexandra	Postponed	Leeds United U21	Crewe
19:00 BST				Stadium: Mornflake Stadium
Note: Fixture was postponed due to international call-ups within the Leeds United U21 squad.

18 October 2022 Group stage	Crewe Alexandra	0–1	Tranmere Rovers	Crewe
19:00 BST	Finney (yellow card) 35'	Report	O'Connor (yellow card) 49'; Jameson (yellow card) 55'; Nevitt 71'	Stadium: Mornflake Stadium; Attendance: 888; Referee: Daniel Middleton

1 November 2022 Group stage	Crewe Alexandra	0–0	Leeds United U21	Crewe
19:00 GMT	Griffiths (yellow card) 63'	Report		Stadium: Mornflake Stadium; Attendance: 1,236; Referee: Ben Toner
	Penalties
	Agyei (penalty scored); Uwakwe (penalty missed); Finney (penalty missed); Sambou (penalty missed); Griffiths (penalty scored)		Klich (penalty scored); Firpo (penalty missed); Fernandez (penalty missed); Perkins (penalty missed); Gyabi (penalty missed)
