= 2023–24 Crewe Alexandra F.C. season =

Crewe Alexandra
2023–24 season
- Chairman: Charles Grant
- Manager: Lee Bell
- Stadium: Mornflake Stadium
- League Two: 6th
- FA Cup: Eliminated in the second round (vs. Bristol Rovers)
- EFL Cup: Eliminated in the Second round (vs. Port Vale)
- EFL Trophy: Group stage
- Top goalscorer: Elliott Nevitt (18)

The 2023–24 season is the 147th season in the history of Crewe Alexandra and their second consecutive season in League Two. The club are participating in League Two, the FA Cup, the EFL Cup, and the 2023–24 EFL Trophy.

== Current squad ==
As of 28 March 2024

No.	Name	Position	Nationality	Place of birth	Date of birth (age)	Previous club	Date signed	Fee	Contract end
Goalkeepers
1	Harvey Davies	GK	(England)	Liverpool	3 September 2003 (age 23)	Liverpool	1 July 2023	Loan	31 May 2024
13	Tom Booth	GK	(England)	Crewe	2 August 2004 (age 22)	Academy	1 July 2022	Trainee	30 June 2025
27	Keiren Westwood	GK	(Republic of Ireland)	(England) Manchester	23 October 1984 (age 42)	Queens Park Rangers	8 February 2024	Free	30 June 2024
40	Mikolaj Lenarcik	GK	(Poland)			Academy	20 November 2023	Trainee	30 June 2024
Defenders
2	Ryan Cooney	RB	(England)	Manchester	26 February 2000 (age 26)	Morecambe	1 July 2023	Free	30 June 2025
3	Rio Adebisi	LB	(England)	Croydon	27 September 2000 (age 26)	Academy	1 July 2019	Trainee	30 June 2024
4	Zac Williams	CB	(Wales)	Rhyl	27 March 2004 (age 22)	Academy	1 July 2022	Trainee	30 June 2024
5	Mickey Demetriou	CB	(England)	Durrington	12 March 1990 (age 36)	(Wales) Newport County	21 July 2023	Free	30 June 2025
6	Luke Offord	CB	(England)	Northwich	19 November 1999 (age 26)	Academy	1 July 2019	Trainee	30 June 2024
12	Ed Turns	CB	(Wales)	(England) Brighton	18 October 2002 (age 24)	Brighton & Hove Albion	1 February 2024	Loan	31 May 2024
21	Aaron Rowe	RB	(England)	Hackney	7 September 2000 (age 26)	Huddersfield Town	30 August 2023	Loan	31 May 2024
28	Lewis Billington	CB	(England)	Crewe	17 February 2004 (age 22)	Academy	1 July 2022	Trainee	30 June 2025
29	Zak Kempster-Down	CB	(England)		16 September 2004 (age 22)	Academy	1 July 2023	Trainee	30 June 2024
35	Nathan Robinson	CB	(England)		4 February 2006 (age 20)	Academy	5 September 2023	Trainee	30 June 2024
38	Lucas Sant	CB	(England)	Stoke-on-Trent	7 February 2006 (age 20)	Academy	20 November 2023	Trainee	30 June 2024
41	Stan Dancey	CB	(England)			Academy	20 November 2023	Trainee	30 June 2024
Midfielders
8	Conor Thomas	DM	(England)	Coventry	29 October 1993 (age 33)	Cheltenham Town	1 July 2022	Free	30 June 2024
11	Joel Tabiner	CM	(England)	Liverpool	30 November 2003 (age 22)	Academy	1 July 2022	Trainee	30 June 2026
14	Lewis Leigh	CM	(England)	Preston	5 December 2003 (age 22)	Preston North End	8 January 2024	Loan	31 May 2024
17	Matúš Holíček	CM	(Slovakia)		25 January 2005 (age 21)	Academy	1 July 2021	Trainee	30 June 2025
19	Owen Lunt	DM	(England)	Prescot	2 September 2004 (age 22)	Academy	1 July 2022	Trainee	30 June 2025
23	Jack Powell	CM	(England)	Canning Town	29 January 1994 (age 32)	Crawley Town	1 July 2023	Free	30 June 2025
24	Charlie Finney	CM	(England)	Crewe	28 October 2003 (age 23)	Academy	1 July 2022	Trainee	30 June 2025
25	Josh Austerfield	CM	(England)	Morley	2 November 2001 (age 25)	Huddersfield Town	18 January 2024	Loan	31 May 2024
34	Lewis Nolan	CM	(England)		6 September 2005 (age 21)	Academy	5 September 2023	Trainee	30 June 2024
37	Matt Senior	CM	(Wales)		3 September 2005 (age 21)	Academy	20 November 2023	Trainee	30 June 2024
—N/a	Joe Collins	CM	(England)			Academy	20 November 2023	Trainee	30 June 2024
Forwards
7	Chris Long	CF	(England)	Huyton	25 February 1995 (age 31)	(Scotland) Motherwell	1 July 2021	Free	30 June 2024
9	Courtney Baker-Richardson	CF	(England)	Coventry	5 December 1995 (age 30)	(Wales) Newport County	1 July 2022	Free	30 June 2024
10	Shilow Tracey	RW	(England)	Newham	29 April 1998 (age 28)	Cambridge United	1 July 2023	Free	30 June 2025
20	Elliott Nevitt	CF	(England)	Liverpool	30 October 1996 (age 30)	Tranmere Rovers	11 January 2023	Undisclosed	30 June 2024
30	Charlie Kirk	LW	(England)	Winsford	24 December 1997 (age 28)	Charlton Athletic	2 February 2024	Free	30 June 2024
32	Max Woodcock	CF	(Scotland)	(England) Congleton	29 July 2005 (age 21)	Academy	1 July 2023	Trainee	30 June 2024
33	Calum Agius	LW	(Wales)	(England) Ellesmere Port	5 September 2005 (age 21)	Academy	1 July 2022	Trainee	30 June 2026
36	Rhys Allport	CF	(England)		2 August 2006 (age 20)	Academy	20 November 2023	Trainee	30 June 2024
Out on Loan
16	Charlie Colkett	CM	(England)	Newham	4 September 1996 (age 30)	Cheltenham Town	1 July 2022	Free	30 June 2024
22	Billy Sass-Davies	CB	(Wales)	Abergele	17 February 2000 (age 26)	Academy	1 July 2018	Trainee	30 June 2024
31	Dave Richards	GK	(Wales)	Abergavenny	31 December 1993 (age 32)	Bristol City	28 July 2015	Free	30 June 2024

== Transfers ==
=== In ===
Date	Pos	Player	Transferred from	Fee	Ref
1 July 2023	RB	Ryan Cooney (ENG)	Morecambe (ENG)	Free transfer	
1 July 2023	CM	Jack Powell (ENG)	Crawley Town (ENG)	Free transfer	
1 July 2023	RW	Shilow Tracey (ENG)	Cambridge United (ENG)	Free transfer	
21 July 2023	CB	Mickey Demetriou (ENG)	Newport County (WAL)	Free transfer	
2 February 2024	LW	Charlie Kirk (ENG)	Charlton Athletic (ENG)	Free transfer	
8 February 2024	GK	Keiren Westwood (IRL)	Free agent	—N/a	

=== Out ===
Date	Pos	Player	Transferred to	Fee	Ref
8 June 2023	CF	Bassala Sambou (GER)	Enosis Neon Paralimni (CYP)	Mutual Consent	
30 June 2023	CF	Dan Agyei (ENG)	Leyton Orient (ENG)	Free transfer	
30 June 2023	CM	Callum Ainley (ENG)	Grimsby Town (ENG)	End of Contract	
30 June 2023	RW	David Amoo (ENG)	Ebbsfleet United (ENG)	Released	
30 June 2023	LB	Sean Lawton (ENG)	Free agent	Released	
30 June 2023	CB	Rod McDonald (ENG)	Harrogate Town (ENG)	End of Contract	
30 June 2023	RB	Kelvin Mellor (ENG)	Accrington Stanley (ENG)	End of Contract	
30 June 2023	LM	Tariq Uwakwe (ENG)	Swindon Town (ENG)	Mutual Consent	
30 June 2023	CM	Ty Webster (ENG)	AFC Telford United (ENG)	Free transfer	
22 August 2023	GK	Jack Flint (ENG)	Bolton Wanderers (ENG)	Free transfer	
10 January 2024	CM	Regan Griffiths (ENG)	Kidderminster Harriers (ENG)	Mutual Consent	
24 January 2024	CB	Connor O'Riordan (IRL)	Blackburn Rovers (ENG)	Undisclosed	
22 February 2024	CF	Connor Evans (WAL)	Waterford (IRL)	Free transfer	

=== Loaned in ===
Date	Pos	Player	Loaned from	Until	Ref
1 July 2023	GK	Harvey Davies (ENG)	Liverpool (ENG)	End of season	
30 August 2023	RB	Aaron Rowe (ENG)	Huddersfield Town (ENG)	End of season	
31 August 2023	AM	Joe White (ENG)	Newcastle United (ENG)	14 January 2024	
8 January 2024	CM	Lewis Leigh (ENG)	Preston North End (ENG)	End of season	
18 January 2024	CM	Josh Austerfield (ENG)	Huddersfield Town (ENG)	End of season	
1 February 2024	CB	Ed Turns (WAL)	Brighton & Hove Albion (ENG)	End of season	
13 April 2024	GK	Max Stryjek (POL)	Wycombe Wanderers (ENG)	20 April 2024	

=== Loaned out ===
Date	Pos	Player	Loaned to	Until	Ref
11 August 2023	GK	Dave Richards (WAL)	St Johnstone (SCO)	End of season	
25 August 2023	CF	Connor Evans (WAL)	Chester (ENG)	25 November 2023	
25 August 2023	CB	Zak Kempster-Down (ENG)	Bamber Bridge (ENG)	23 January 2024	
25 August 2023	CF	Max Woodcock (SCO)	Runcorn Linnets (ENG)	24 September 2023	
1 September 2023	CM	Regan Griffiths (ENG)	Boreham Wood (ENG)	11 January 2024	
1 September 2023	CB	Billy Sass-Davies (WAL)	Boreham Wood (ENG)	End of Season (Note: On 29 January, Sass-Davies' loan at Boreham Wood was extended until the end of season.)	
24 November 2023	CF	Connor Evans (WAL)	Marine (ENG)	23 December 2023	
31 January 2024	CM	Charlie Colkett (ENG)	Notts County (ENG)	End of season	

== Pre-season and friendlies ==
On 7 June, Crewe announced their pre-season schedule with matches against Halesowen Town, Whitchurch Alport, Burton Albion, Vauxhall Motors, Lincoln City and Barnsley.

Win Draw Loss Fixtures

8 July 2023 Friendly	Halesowen Town	0–5	Crewe Alexandra	Halesowen
15:00 BST		Report	Long 34'; Baker-Richardson 54'; Woodcock 55'; Lunt 66'; Williams 69'	Stadium: The Grove; Attendance: 927

11 July 2023 Friendly	Whitchurch Alport	0–5	Crewe Alexandra	Whitchurch
19:30 BST		Report	Long 5' (pen.); Woodcock 51'; Nevitt 57'; Lunt 68'; Griffiths 76'	Stadium: Yockings Park

15 July 2023 Friendly	Crewe Alexandra	2–2	Burton Albion	Crewe
15:00 BST	Long 17' (pen.); Baker-Richardson 61'	Report	Stockton 19'; Sweeney 45'	Stadium: Mornflake Stadium; Attendance: 1,460 (171 away); Referee: Oliver Langford

18 July 2023 Friendly	Vauxhall Motors	1–2	Crewe Alexandra	Ellesmere Port
19:30 BST	Buckley 51' (pen.)	Report	Woodcock 34'; Evans 74'	Stadium: Rivacre Park

22 July 2023 Friendly	Crewe Alexandra	1–2	Lincoln City	Crewe
15:00 BST	Tabiner 57'	Report	Mandroiu 62', 73'	Stadium: Mornflake Stadium; Attendance: 1,216 (112 away); Referee: Darren Handley

25 July 2023 Friendly	Runcorn Linnets	0–3	Crewe Alexandra	Runcorn
19:30 BST		Report	Kempster-Down 23'; Woodcock 38'; Evans 40'	Stadium: APEC Taxis Stadium

29 July 2023 Friendly	Barnsley	2–1	Crewe Alexandra	Barnsley
15:00 BST	Norwood 4'; Łopata 47'	Report	Tracey 70'	Stadium: Oakwell; Referee: Michael Salisbury

== Competitions ==
=== Overall record ===
Competition	First match	Last match	Starting round	Final position	Record							
Competition	First match	Last match	Starting round	Final position	Pld	W	D	L	GF	GA	GD	Win %
League Two	5 August	27 April	Matchday 1	6th	46	19	14	13	69	65	+4	41.30
FA Cup	5 November	12 December	First round	Second round	3	1	1	1	7	7	+0	33.33
EFL Cup	8 August	29 August	First round	Second round	2	0	2	0	1	1	+0	0.00
EFL Trophy	5 September	21 November	Group stage	Group stage	3	1	0	2	2	5	−3	33.33
Play-offs	6 May 2024	19 May 2024	Semi-final	Final	3	1	0	2	2	4	−2	33.33
Total					57	22	17	18	81	82	−1	38.60

Last updated: 20 May 2024
Source: Soccerway

=== League Two ===
==== League table ====
Pos	Team	Pld	W	D	L	GF	GA	GD	Pts	Promotion, qualification or relegation
3	Mansfield Town (P)	46	24	14	8	90	47	+43	86	Promoted to EFL League One
4	Milton Keynes Dons	46	23	9	14	83	68	+15	78	Qualified for League Two play-offs
5	Doncaster Rovers	46	21	8	17	73	68	+5	71	Qualified for League Two play-offs
6	Crewe Alexandra	46	19	14	13	69	65	+4	71	Qualified for League Two play-offs
7	Crawley Town (O, P)	46	21	7	18	73	67	+6	70	Qualified for League Two play-offs
8	Barrow	46	18	15	13	62	56	+6	69	
9	Bradford City	46	19	12	15	61	59	+2	69	

Source: EFL Official Website
Rules for classification: 1) Points; 2) Goal difference; 3) Number of goals scored; 4) Head-to-head results; 5) Wins; 6) Away goals; 7) Penalty points (sec 9.5); 8) 12-point sending off offences
(O) Play-off winners; (P) Promoted

==== Results summary ====
Overall								Home						Away					
Pld	W	D	L	GF	GA	GD	Pts	W	D	L	GF	GA	GD	W	D	L	GF	GA	GD
46	19	14	13	69	65	+4	71	11	5	7	36	35	+1	8	9	6	33	30	+3

Last updated: 13 May 2024.
Source: Soccerway

==== Results by round ====
Round	1	2	3	4	5	6	7	8	9	10	11	12	13	14	15	16	17	19	20	21	22	23	24	25	26	27	28	29	30	31	32	33	34	35	36	37	38	39	40	41	42	43	18^{1}	44	45	46
Ground	H	A	H	H	A	H	A	A	H	A	H	A	H	A	H	A	H	H	A	A	H	H	A	A	H	A	H	A	H	A	H	A	H	A	H	A	H	A	H	A	H	A	A	H	H	A
Result	D	D	W	D	L	W	W	D	W	D	W	L	W	W	L	W	W	W	D	L	D	L	L	D	W	W	W	W	L	D	W	W	D	W	L	L	W	L	D	D	L	D	W	L	L	D
Position	10	16	6	11	14	11	6	7	6	7	3	6	4	3	5	5	4	4	5	5	5	5	6	8	6	5	5	4	5	5	3	3	4	3	4	5	4	5	5	6	6	6	5	5	5	6
Points	1	2	5	6	6	9	12	13	16	17	20	20	23	26	26	29	32	35	36	36	37	37	37	38	41	44	47	50	50	51	54	57	58	61	61	61	64	64	65	66	66	67	70	70	70	71

Updated to match(es) played on 20 April 2024. Source: Soccerway
A = Away; H = Home; W = Win; D = Draw; L = Loss; P = Postponed
Notes:
- ^{1} Matchday 18 (vs Morecambe) was postponed due to the international call-ups.

==== Matches ====
On 22 June, the EFL League Two fixtures were released.

Win Draw Loss Fixtures

5 August 2023 1	Crewe Alexandra	2–2	Mansfield Town	Crewe
15:00 BST	Demetriou 32'; Offord (yellow card) 37'; Adebisi 60'; Thomas (yellow card) 90'	Report	Keillor-Dunn 22', 26' (yellow card) 58'; Macdonald (red card) 58'; Kilgour (yellow card) 59'; Quinn (yellow card) 63'; Reed (yellow card) 87'	Stadium: Mornflake Stadium; Attendance: 5,574; Referee: Ben Atkinson

12 August 2023 2	Swindon Town	2–2	Crewe Alexandra	Swindon
15:00 BST	Godwin-Malife 21'; McEachran (yellow card) 26'; Young 47'; Mahoney (yellow card) 82'; Blake-Tracy (yellow card) 87'; Brewitt (yellow card) 90+6'	Report	Adebisi (yellow card) 15' (goal) 85'; Powell (yellow card) 15'; Williams (yellow card) 20' (goal) 60'; Thomas (yellow card) 23'; Long (yellow card) 67'; Davies (yellow card) 90+2'	Stadium: The County Ground; Attendance: 9,022; Referee: Scott Jackson

15 August 2023 3	Crewe Alexandra	4–2	Newport County	Crewe
19:45 BST	Demetriou 8', 57'; Long 66' (pen.); Nevitt 71'	Report	Evans 21'; Charsley 75'; Bondswell (yellow card) 83'; Waite (yellow card) 90+3'	Stadium: Mornflake Stadium; Attendance: 3,619; Referee: Adam Herczeg

19 August 2023 4	Crewe Alexandra	2–2	Walsall	Crewe
15:00 BST	Nevitt 60' (yellow card) 77'; Powell 90+4'	Report	Draper 1'; Hutchinson 29'; Stirk (yellow card) 65'	Stadium: Mornflake Stadium; Attendance: 4,892; Referee: Sam Allison

26 August 2023 5	Bradford City	1–0	Crewe Alexandra	Bradford
15:00 BST	Walker 43'; Kelly (yellow card) 45+1'; Richards (yellow card) 71'	Report		Stadium: University of Bradford Stadium; Attendance: 16,736; Referee: Darren Drysdale

2 September 2023 6	Crewe Alexandra	3–1	Milton Keynes Dons	Crewe
15:00 BST	Thomas (yellow card) 55' (goal) 62'; Baker-Richardson 69'; O'Riordan (yellow card) 90'; Long 90'; Rowe (yellow card) 90+2'; Davies (yellow card) 90+3'	Report	Leko 8'; Gilbey (yellow card) 75'	Stadium: Mornflake Stadium; Attendance: 3,927; Referee: Christopher Pollard

9 September 2023 7	Forest Green Rovers	1–4	Crewe Alexandra	Nailsworth
15:00 BST	Brown 35'; Deeney (yellow card) 46'; Robson (yellow card) 53'; Bunker (yellow card) 68'; Johnson (yellow card) 74'	Report	Tabiner (yellow card) 11'; Offord (yellow card) 18'; Long 49'; Baker-Richardson 60', 69'; O'Riordan (yellow card) 64'; Nevitt 82'	Stadium: The New Lawn; Attendance: 1,855; Referee: Thomas Parsons

16 September 2023 8	AFC Wimbledon	2–2	Crewe Alexandra	Wimbledon
15:00 BST	Neufville 30'; Tilley 38'; Ogundere (yellow card) 52'; Currie (yellow card) 57'	Report	Tabiner 51'; White (yellow card) 90+7'; Nevitt 90+10'; Rowe (yellow card) 90+13'	Stadium: Cherry Red Records Stadium; Attendance: 8,147; Referee: Lewis Smith

23 September 2023 9	Crewe Alexandra	2–1	Colchester United	Crewe
15:00 BST	Long 3', 8' (pen.); Demetriou (yellow card) 90+3'	Report	Tovide 53'	Stadium: Mornflake Stadium; Attendance: 4,070; Referee: Charles Breakspear

30 September 2023 10	Wrexham	3–3	Crewe Alexandra	Wrexham
15:00 BST	Palmer (yellow card) 11'; Barnett (red card) 36'; Mullin 40' (Hayden) 47' (Palmer) (yellow card) 90+2'; McClean (yellow card) 45+2'; Boyle (yellow card) 45+4'; Fletcher 90+5' (Mendy)	Report	Demetriou 25' (Tabiner); Tracey (yellow card) 33' (goal) 65' (Adebisi); Long 45+5' (pen.); Williams (yellow card) 79'; Davies (yellow card) 82'; Holíček (yellow card) 87'	Stadium: STōK Cae Ras; Attendance: 10,007; Referee: Lee Swabey

3 October 2023 11	Crewe Alexandra	2–0	Gillingham	Crewe
19:45 BST	O'Riordan 30'; Powell (yellow card) 35'; White 85'	Report		Stadium: Mornflake Stadium; Attendance: 3,427; Referee: Daniel Middleton

7 October 2023 12	Salford City	4–2	Crewe Alexandra	Salford
15:00 BST	Ingram (yellow card) 35'; Smith 45+3', 58'; Watt (yellow card) 68'; Watson 71'; Berkoe 90+1'	Report	Baker-Richardson 27', 90+3', (yellow card) 38'; O'Riordan (yellow card) 59'	Stadium: Peninsula Stadium; Attendance: 3,025; Referee: Thomas Kirk

14 October 2023 13	Crewe Alexandra	2–0	Tranmere Rovers	Crewe
15:00 BST	Demetriou 11'; Davies (yellow card) 37'; Long 52'; Tracey (yellow card) 77'; Powell (yellow card) 90+3'	Report	McGee (red card) 48'; Hendry (yellow card) 90+5'; Davies (yellow card) 90+6' (yellow-red card) 90+12'	Stadium: Mornflake Stadium; Attendance: 5,826; Referee: Ross Joyce

21 October 2023 14	Crawley Town	2–4	Crewe Alexandra	Crawley
15:00 BST	Conroy (yellow card) 2'; Lolos 15' (yellow card) 66'; Darcy 28'; Wright (yellow card) 45+3'; Williams (yellow card) 90+6'	Report	Tracey 20'; Baker-Richardson (yellow card) 54' (goal) 75'; Conroy 56' (o.g.); Nevitt 90+4' (yellow card) 90+6'	Stadium: Broadfield Stadium; Attendance: 3,028; Referee: Sam Purkiss

24 October 2023 15	Crewe Alexandra	0–2	Stockport County	Crewe
19:45 BST	Long (yellow card) 59'; Nevitt (yellow card) 90+8'	Report	Wootton 66' (yellow card) 90+3'; Olaofe 89'	Stadium: Mornflake Stadium; Attendance: 6,634; Referee: Martin Woods

28 October 2023 16	Harrogate Town	0–1	Crewe Alexandra	Harrogate
15:00 GMT	Sutton (yellow card) 45'; Folarin (yellow card) 90+3'; McDonald (yellow card) 90+6'	Report	Williams 31'	Stadium: The EnviroVent Stadium; Attendance: 2,244; Referee: Declan Bourne

11 November 2023 17	Crewe Alexandra	1–0	Notts County	Crewe
15:00 GMT	Offord (yellow card) 14'; Cooney (yellow card) 90+1'; Baker-Richardson 90+8' (pen.)	Report	Cameron (yellow card) 45+1'; Baldwin (yellow card) 50'; O'Brien (yellow card) 70'; Jones (yellow card) 88'; Randall (yellow card) 89'	Stadium: Mornflake Stadium; Attendance: 5,663; Referee: Simon Mather

25 November 2023 18	Crewe Alexandra	3–2	Doncaster Rovers	Crewe
15:00 GMT	Offord 29'; O'Riordan 44', 90+2'; Thomas (yellow card) 90+1'	Report	Faal 16'; Maxwell (yellow card) 19'; Anderson (yellow card) 37'; Ironside 57'	Stadium: Mornflake Stadium; Attendance: 4,263; Referee: Martin Coy

28 November 2023 19	Sutton United	1–1	Crewe Alexandra	Sutton
19:45 GMT	John 28'; Coley (yellow card) 82'; Pereira (yellow card) 88'	Report	Baker-Richardson 17'; Cooney (yellow card) 45'	Stadium: VBS Community Stadium; Attendance: 2,233; Referee: John Busby

9 December 2023 20	Grimsby Town	2–1	Crewe Alexandra	Cleethorpes
15:00 GMT	Eisa 18'; Mullarkey (yellow card) 33'; Rose 45'	Report	White 78' (yellow card) 79'; Rowe (yellow card) 85'; O'Riordan (yellow card) 90+1'	Stadium: Blundell Park; Attendance: 5,291; Referee: Richie Watkins

16 December 2023 21	Crewe Alexandra	3–3	Accrington Stanley	Crewe
15:00 GMT	Rowe 4'; Demetriou 29'; Tracey (yellow card) 45'; Thomas (yellow card) 51'; Offord (red card) 80'; Nevitt 90+8' (yellow card) 90+9'	Report	Nolan 6'; Martin (yellow card) 71'; B. Woods 87'; J. Woods 90+6'; Hills (yellow card) 90+9'	Stadium: Mornflake Stadium; Attendance: 4,012; Referee: Paul Howard

22 December 2023 22	Crewe Alexandra	1–3	Barrow	Crewe
19:45 GMT	Nevitt (yellow card) 40' (goal) 58'; Baker-Richardson (yellow card) 64'; Demetriou (yellow card) 66'; Thomas (yellow card) 68'	Report	Whitfield 27', 76'; Spence (yellow card) 34'; Garner 50' (pen.); White (yellow card) 61'; Farman (yellow card) 84'; Gotts (yellow card) 90'	Stadium: Mornflake Stadium; Attendance: 7,646; Referee: Alan Young
Note: Fixture was originally scheduled for 23 December but was moved a day earlier.

26 December 2023 23	Walsall	2–0	Crewe Alexandra	Bescot
15:00 GMT	Hutchinson (yellow card) 8'; Draper 33'; McEntee 61'	Report	White (yellow card) 39'; O'Riordan (yellow card) 54'; Long (yellow card) 71'; Rowe (yellow card) 90+1'; Cooney (yellow card) 90+3'	Stadium: Poundland Bescot Stadium; Attendance: 5,672; Referee: Scott Jackson

29 December 2023 24	Newport County	1–1	Crewe Alexandra	Newport
19:45 GMT	Evans 64'	Report	Long 48'; Williams (yellow card) 72'	Stadium: Rodney Parade; Attendance: 3,926; Referee: Ben Speedie

1 January 2024 25	Crewe Alexandra	1–0	Bradford City	Crewe
15:00 GMT	Long 13' (pen.); Rowe (yellow card) 39'; Booth (yellow card) 69'; Billington (yellow card) 77'; Demetriou (yellow card) 87'; Baker-Richardson (yellow card) 90+5'	Report	Smallwood (yellow card) 38'; Halliday (yellow card) 90+1'	Stadium: Mornflake Stadium; Attendance: 5,529; Referee: Peter Wright

6 January 2024 26	Mansfield Town	0–1	Crewe Alexandra	Mansfield
15:00 GMT	Flint (yellow card) 12'; Maris (yellow card) 45+2'	Report	White 2'; Thomas (yellow card) 63'; Tracey (yellow card) 90+3'	Stadium: One Call Stadium; Attendance: 7,295; Referee: Matthew Corlett

13 January 2024 27	Crewe Alexandra	2–1	Swindon Town	Crewe
15:00 GMT	Nevitt 13' (yellow card) 90+4'; Thomas (yellow card) 56'; Baker-Richardson 71'; Rowe (yellow card) 72'	Report	Kinsella (yellow card) 17'; Minturn (yellow card) 20'; Austin 30' (yellow card) 34'	Stadium: Mornflake Stadium; Attendance: 4,597; Referee: Leigh Doughty

20 January 2024 28	Barrow	1–3	Crewe Alexandra	Barrow-in-Furness
15:00 GMT	Gotts 9'; Chester (yellow card) 90+6'	Report	Tracey (yellow card) 9'; Nevitt 19', (yellow card) 90+7'; Billington 64', (yellow card) 80'; Holíček 84'; Demetriou (yellow card) 86'; Offord (yellow card) 90+2'; O'Riordan (yellow card) 90+4'	Stadium: SO Legal Stadium; Attendance: 3,757; Referee: Thomas Parsons

27 January 2024 29	Crewe Alexandra	2–3	Salford City	Crewe
15:00 GMT	Rowe (yellow card) 27' (goal) 44'; Nevitt 45+2'	Report	Smith 4', 55', 85'; John (yellow card) 23'; Garbutt (yellow card) 40'; Lund (yellow card) 89'; Hendry (yellow card) 90+4'	Stadium: Mornflake Stadium; Attendance: 4,938; Referee: Stephen Parkinson

3 February 2024 30	Tranmere Rovers	0–0	Crewe Alexandra	Birkenhead
15:00 GMT	Walker (yellow card) 87'	Report	Nevitt (yellow card) 47'; Long (yellow card) 61'; Thomas (yellow card) 76'; Baker-Richardson (yellow card) 90+3'	Stadium: Prenton Park; Attendance: 7,169; Referee: Carl Brook

10 February 2024 31	Crewe Alexandra	1–0	Crawley Town	Crewe
15:00 GMT	Rowe (yellow card) 11'; Cooney (yellow card) 16'; Adebisi 61'; Offord (yellow card) 90'; Leigh (yellow card) 90+4'	Report	Campbell (yellow card) 13'; Addai (yellow card) 54'	Stadium: Mornflake Stadium; Attendance: 4,189; Referee: Martin Coy

13 February 2024 32	Stockport County	1–3	Crewe Alexandra	Edgeley
19:45 GMT	Olaofe 35'	Report	Demetriou 8'; Turns 43'; Austerfield 51'; Baker-Richardson (yellow card) 90+2'	Stadium: Edgeley Park; Attendance: 9,363; Referee: Neil Hair

17 February 2024 33	Crewe Alexandra	0–0	Harrogate Town	Crewe
15:00 GMT		Report	Cornelius (yellow card) 7'; Abu (yellow card) 42'; Thomson (yellow card) 67'	Stadium: Mornflake Stadium; Attendance: 4,421; Referee: David Rock

24 February 2024 34	Notts County	1–3	Crewe Alexandra	Nottingham
15:00 GMT	Ashby-Hammond (yellow card) 18'; Bostock (yellow card) 54'; Langstaff (yellow card) 81'; O'Brien 83'; Jatta (yellow card) 90'	Report	Demetriou 5', (yellow card) 53'; Nevitt 19' (pen.); Kirk (yellow card) 27'; Austerfield 77'; Turns (yellow card) 81'; Adebisi (yellow card) 88'	Stadium: Meadow Lane; Attendance: 11,470; Referee: Ross Joyce

2 March 2024 35	Crewe Alexandra	2–3	Morecambe	Crewe
15:00 GMT	Nevitt 18'; Adebisi (yellow card) 25'; Tracey 49'; Demetriou (yellow card) 58'	Report	Stokes (yellow card) 58'; Senior (yellow card) 68'; Adams 69'; Hiwula (yellow card) 72'; Slew 74'; Rawson 83'	Stadium: Mornflake Stadium; Attendance: 4,995; Referee: Farai Hallam

9 March 2024 36	Doncaster Rovers	2–0	Crewe Alexandra	Doncaster
15:00 GMT	Adelakun 17'; Rowe 58'	Report	Rowe (yellow card) 37'; Adebisi (yellow card) 43'; Cooney (yellow card) 54'; Williams (yellow card) 65'	Stadium: Eco-Power Stadium; Attendance: 6,617; Referee: Craig Hicks

12 March 2024 37	Crewe Alexandra	1–0	Sutton United	Crewe
19:45 GMT	Nevitt 71'; Austerfield (yellow card) 90+1'	Report	Sowunmi (yellow card) 42'; Beautyman (yellow card) 48'; Kizzi (yellow card) 77'; Duke-McKenna (yellow card) 90+1'	Stadium: Mornflake Stadium; Attendance: 3,562; Referee: Andrew Humphries

16 March 2023 38	Milton Keynes Dons	3–1	Crewe Alexandra	Denbigh
15:00 GMT	Dennis 5', 22'; Wearne 25'; Bate (yellow card) 62'; Kemp (yellow card) 70'; Tomlinson (yellow card) 72'	Report	Nevitt 19'; Turns (yellow card) 38'; Cooney (yellow card) 72'	Stadium: Stadium MK; Attendance: 6,661; Referee: Paul Howard

23 March 2024 39	Crewe Alexandra	1–1	AFC Wimbledon	Crewe
15:00 GMT	Adebisi 13'; Nevitt (yellow card) 85'; Long (yellow card) 90+1'	Report	Gordon 2'; O'Toole (yellow card) 63'; Davison (yellow card) 87'	Stadium: Mornflake Stadium; Attendance: 5,110; Referee: Darren Drysdale

29 March 2024 40	Gillingham	0–0	Crewe Alexandra	Gillingham
15:00 GMT	Morris (yellow card) 46'; Ehmer (yellow card) 82'	Report	Cooney (yellow card) 70'; Austerfield (yellow card) 74'; Turns (yellow card) 84'	Stadium: Priestfield Stadium; Attendance: 7,112; Referee: Tom Reeves

1 April 2024 41	Crewe Alexandra	0–3	Forest Green Rovers	Crewe
15:00 BST	Nevitt (yellow card) 43'; Kirk (yellow card) 75'; Adebisi (yellow card) 76'	Report	Garrick 13', 26'; Robson 27'; Inniss (yellow card) 43'; Osadebe (yellow card) 52'; Jones (yellow card) 87'	Stadium: Mornflake Stadium; Attendance: 5,478; Referee: Geoff Eltringham

6 April 2024 42	Accrington Stanley	0–0	Crewe Alexandra	Accrington
15:00 BST	Henderson (yellow card) 11'; Martin (yellow card) 57'	Report	Nevitt (yellow card) 90+1'	Stadium: Crown Ground; Attendance: 2,658; Referee: Adam Herczeg

9 April 2024 43	Morecambe	0–1	Crewe Alexandra	Morecambe
19:45 BST	Songo'o (yellow card) 90+5'	Report	Nevitt 70'; Leigh (red card) 89'	Stadium: Mazuma Stadium; Attendance: 3,564; Referee: Scott Oldham
Note: Fixture was originally scheduled for 18 November and 23 January, but was postponed due to international call-ups and then a waterlogged pitch respectively.

13 April 2024 44	Crewe Alexandra	0–3	Grimsby Town	Crewe
15:00 BST	Cooney (yellow card) 34'; Williams (yellow card) 62'	Report	Mullarkey 38', (yellow card) 45'; Thompson 59'; Hume 90'	Stadium: Mornflake Stadium; Attendance: 5,665; Referee: Simon Mather

20 April 2024 45	Crewe Alexandra	0–3	Wrexham	Crewe
12:30 BST	Rowe (yellow card) 45'; Williams (yellow card) 45'; Cooney (red card) 54'; Nevitt (yellow card) 86'	Report	Palmer 24'; McClean (yellow card) 45'; Mullin 45+1'; Cannon 61'	Stadium: Mornflake Stadium; Attendance: 9,033; Referee: Seb Stockbridge
Note: Fixture was initially scheduled for a 15:00 kick-off, but was moved at request from the Cheshire Police.

27 April 2024 46	Colchester United	1–1	Crewe Alexandra	Colchester
15:00 BST	Chilvers 35'; Kelleher (yellow card) 62'	Report	Rowe (yellow card) 49'; Nevitt 90+2'	Stadium: Colchester Community Stadium; Attendance: 6,491; Referee: Lewis Smith

==== Play-offs ====
Crewe finished 6th in the regular 2023–24 EFL League Two season, so were drawn against 5th placed Doncaster Rovers in the Play-off Semi-Final. The first leg, which Doncaster won 2–0, took place at Gresty Road and the second leg took place at the Eco-Power Stadium. Crewe won the second leg 2–0, making the aggregate score 2–2, and then won a penalty shoot-out 4–3 to reach the final for promotion to EFL League One. Crewe lost the final at Wembley, beaten 2-0 by Crawley Town.

6 May 2024 Semi-Final First leg	Crewe Alexandra	0–2	Doncaster Rovers	Crewe
17:30 BST		Report	Molyneux 34'; Biggins 48'	Stadium: Gresty Road; Attendance: 8,220; Referee: Sunny Singh Gill

10 May 2024 Semi-Final Second leg	Doncaster Rovers	0–2 (a.e.t.) (2–2 agg.) (3–4 p)	Crewe Alexandra	Doncaster
20:00 BST	Demetriou 6'; Maxwell 16' (o.g.)	Report		Stadium: Eco-Power Stadium; Attendance: 12,889; Referee: Scott Oldham
	Penalties
	Ironside (penalty scored); Westbrooke (penalty missed); Miller (penalty scored); Bailey (penalty scored); Adelakun (penalty missed)		(penalty scored) Baker-Richardson; (penalty missed) Demetriou; (penalty scored) Cooney; (penalty scored) Leigh; (penalty scored) Kirk

19 May 2024 Final	Crewe Alexandra	0–2	Crawley Town	Wembley
13:00 BST	Rowe (yellow card) 19'; Adebisi (yellow card) 59'; Tabiner (yellow card) 66'	Report	Orsi 41'; L. Kelly 85'	Stadium: Wembley Stadium; Attendance: 33,341; Referee: Ben Toner

=== FA Cup ===
Crewe were drawn at home to Derby County in the first round.

Win Draw Loss Fixtures

5 November 2023 First round	Crewe Alexandra	2–2	Derby County	Crewe
14:45 GMT	Baker-Richardson 41'; Nevitt 54'	Report	Mendez-Laing 89'; Hourihane 90+3'	Stadium: Mornflake Stadium; Attendance: 5,201; Referee: Scott Oldham

14 November 2023 First round replay	Derby County	1–3	Crewe Alexandra	Derby
19:45 GMT	Barkhuizen 3'; Wilson (yellow card) 28'; Sibley (yellow card) 37'	Report	Rowe 7', 21'; Demetriou 65'; Tracey (yellow card) 79'; Thomas (yellow card) 90+1'	Stadium: Pride Park Stadium; Attendance: 6,439; Referee: Christopher Pollard

12 December 2023 Second round	Crewe Alexandra	2–4	Bristol Rovers	Crewe
19:45 GMT	Offord (yellow card) 40'; Baker-Richardson (yellow card) 55'; Nevitt 65'; Rowe 73'	Report	Marquis 18' (yellow card) 41'; Wilson 25'; Evans 42'; Cooney 49' (o.g.); Taylor (yellow card) 65'	Stadium: Mornflake Stadium; Attendance: 3,127; Referee: Declan Bourne
Note: Fixture was originally scheudled for 2 December, but was postponed due to an unsafe frozen pitch.

=== EFL Cup ===
Crewe were drawn away to Sunderland in the first round and to Port Vale in the second round.

Win Draw Loss Fixtures

8 August 2023 First round	Sunderland	1–1 (3–5 p)	Crewe Alexandra	Sunderland
19:45 BST	Batth (yellow card) 16'; Bennette (yellow card) 31'; Pritchard (yellow card) 33'; Ba (yellow card) 50'; Rigg 64'	Report	Powell (yellow card) 13'; Offord 45+1' (yellow card) 89'; Holíček (yellow card) 83'; Lunt (yellow card) 84'	Stadium: Stadium of Light; Attendance: 10,763; Referee: Scott Oldham
	Penalties
	Dack (penalty scored); Pritchard (penalty scored); Ekwah (penalty missed); Triantis (penalty scored)		Nevitt (penalty scored); Long (penalty scored); Adebisi (penalty scored); Tabiner (penalty scored); Cooney (penalty scored)

29 August 2023 Second round	Port Vale	0–0 (2–0 p)	Crewe Alexandra	Burslem
19:45 BST		Report		Stadium: Vale Park; Attendance: 6,375; Referee: Seb Stockbridge
	Penalties
	Wilson (penalty scored); Arblaster (penalty scored); Sang (penalty missed)		Nevitt (penalty missed); Long (penalty missed); Adebisi (penalty missed); Tabiner (penalty missed)

=== EFL Trophy ===
In the group stage, Crewe were drawn into Northern Group B alongside Port Vale, Wrexham and Newcastle United U21.

Pos	Div	Team	Pld	W	PW	PL	L	GF	GA	GD	Pts	Qualification
1	L2	Wrexham	3	3	0	0	0	6	1	+5	9	Advance to Round 2
2	L1	Port Vale	3	1	1	0	1	3	3	0	5	Advance to Round 2
3	L2	Crewe Alexandra	3	1	0	0	2	2	5	−3	3	
4	ACA	Newcastle United U21	3	0	0	1	2	2	4	−2	1	

Updated to match(es) played on 7 November 2023. Source: EFL.com

Win Draw Loss Fixtures

5 September 2023 Group stage	Port Vale	1–0	Crewe Alexandra	Burslem
19:45 BST	Garrity 18'; Shorrock (yellow card) 47'; Lowe (yellow card) 78'; Clark (yellow card) 90+8'	Report	Booth (yellow card) 33'; Cooney (yellow card) 68' (yellow-red card) 90+8'	Stadium: Vale Park; Attendance: 2,846; Referee: Steven Copeland

10 October 2023 Group stage	Crewe Alexandra	0–3	Wrexham	Crewe
19:00 BST	Colkett (yellow card) 33'; Offord (red card) 72'	Report	Tunnicliffe 5' (Davies); Davies (yellow card) 11' (goal) 13' (Bickerstaff); Young 73' (pen.)	Stadium: Mornflake Stadium; Attendance: 3,571; Referee: Aaron Jackson

21 November 2023 Group stage	Crewe Alexandra	2–1	Newcastle United U21	Crewe
19:45 GMT	Allport 47'; Evans (yellow card) 58' (goal) 83'	Report	Huntley 60' (pen.); Carlyon (yellow card) 65'	Stadium: Mornflake Stadium; Attendance: 551; Referee: Scott Tallis
