= Harvey Davies =

English footballer (born 2003)

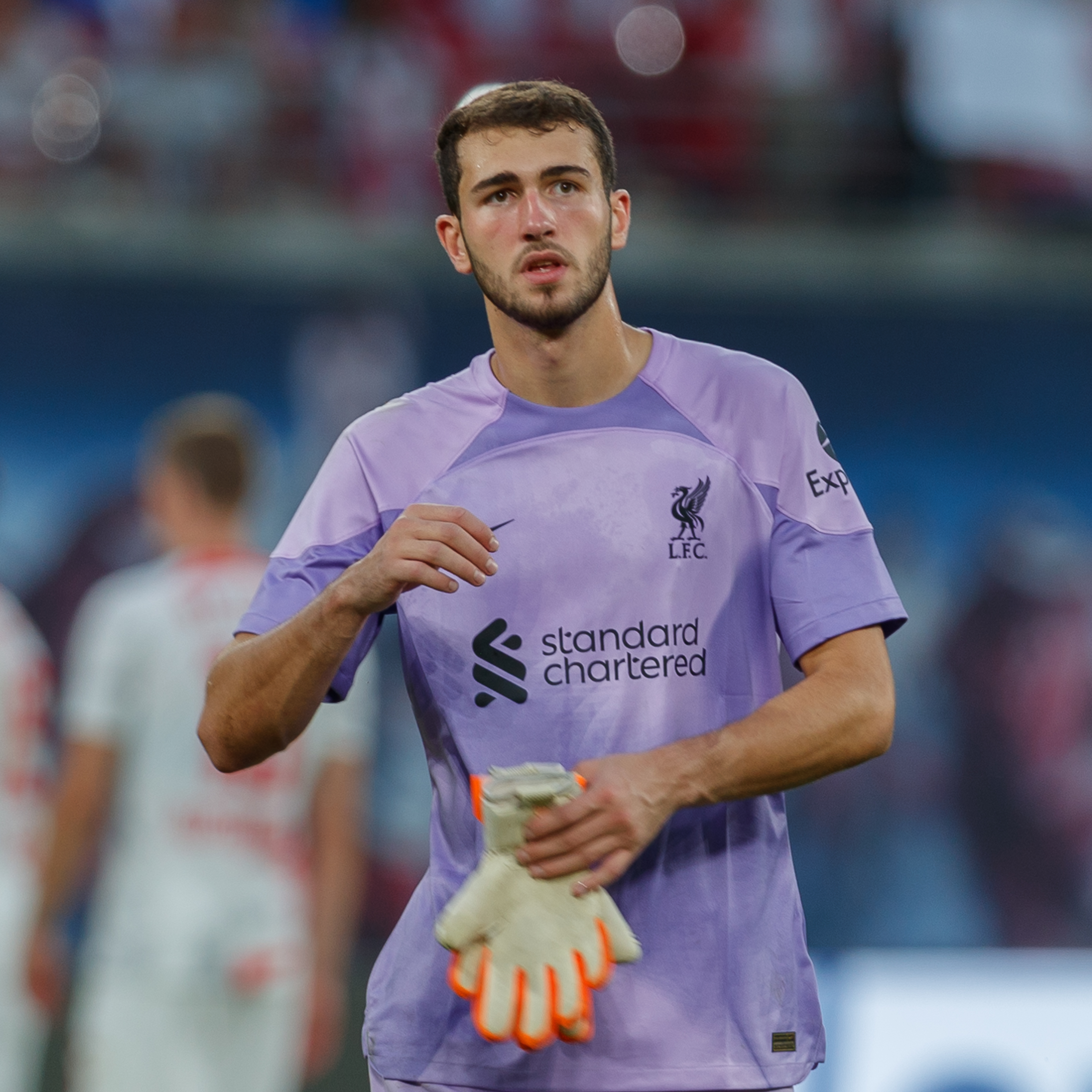
- Davies with Liverpool in 2022

Personal information
- Full name: Harvey Peter Davies
- Date of birth: 3 September 2003 (age 23)
- Place of birth: Liverpool, England
- Height: 6 ft 3 in (1.90 m)
- Position: Goalkeeper

Team information
- Current team: Liverpool
- Number: 95

Youth career
- 2011–2020: Liverpool

Senior career*
| Years | Team | Apps | (Gls) |
| 2020– | Liverpool | 0 | (0) |
| 2023–2024 | → Crewe Alexandra (loan) | 27 | (0) |
| 2025–2026 | → Crawley Town (loan) | 17 | (0) |

International career^{‡}
| 2021 | England U19 | 1 | (0) |
| 2022– | England U20 | 2 | (0) |
Medal record
Men's football
Representing England
UEFA European Under-19 Championship
| Winner | 2022 Slovakia |
- * Club domestic league appearances and goals as of 12:05, 2 February 2026 (UTC) ‡ National team caps and goals as of 22:36, 22 March 2023 (UTC)

Harvey Peter Davies (born 3 September 2003) is an English professional footballer who plays as a goalkeeper for Premier League club Liverpool.

== Club career ==
=== Liverpool ===
Davies joined the Liverpool academy from under-nine level. Following an injury crisis he was named on the substitute bench for UEFA Champions League matches against Red Bull Salzburg and both legs of the quarter-final against Real Madrid during the 2020–21 season. He signed a first professional contract aged 17 in 2021. He signed a new contract with the club in July 2022. Davies was included in the pre-season first team training camps and tour of the Far East in the summer of 2022, playing in a pre-season friendly against Crystal Palace in Singapore.

==== Crewe Alexandra (loan) ====
In June 2023 it was announced Davies would be joining Crewe Alexandra on a season-long loan deal, for the 2023–24 season. Aged 19, he made his professional and Crewe debut at Gresty Road on 5 August 2023, conceding two first-half goals in a 2–2 draw with Mansfield Town. On 9 August 2023, Davies saved a penalty, helping Crewe win a penalty shoot-out 5–3, after a 1–1 draw in their EFL League Cup first round tie against Championship side Sunderland at the Stadium of Light.

==== Crawley Town (loan) ====
On 26 June 2025, Liverpool announced that Davies had signed a new deal with the club, and he would be going on loan to Crawley Town for the 2025–26 season. Having lost his starting spot to Jacob Chapman, he was recalled from his loan on 2 February 2026.

== International career ==
Davies was part of the England national under-19 football team that won the 2022 UEFA European Under-19 Championship held in Slovakia in June and July 2022. In September 2022 he was called up to the England U20 team.

== Career statistics ==
As of match played 17 January 2026

Appearances and goals by club, season and competition
| Club | Season | League | | | FA Cup | | EFL Cup | | Continental | | Other | | Total | |
| Club | Season | Division | Apps | Goals | Apps | Goals | Apps | Goals | Apps | Goals | Apps | Goals | Apps | Goals |
|---|---|---|---|---|---|---|---|---|---|---|---|---|---|---|
| Liverpool | 2020–21 | Premier League | 0 | 0 | 0 | 0 | 0 | 0 | 0 | 0 | 0 | 0 | 0 | 0 |
| Liverpool | 2021–22 | Premier League | 0 | 0 | 0 | 0 | 0 | 0 | 0 | 0 | — | | 0 | 0 |
| Liverpool | 2022–23 | Premier League | 0 | 0 | 0 | 0 | 0 | 0 | 0 | 0 | 0 | 0 | 0 | 0 |
| Liverpool | 2023–24 | Premier League | 0 | 0 | 0 | 0 | 0 | 0 | 0 | 0 | — | | 0 | 0 |
| Liverpool | 2024–25 | Premier League | 0 | 0 | 0 | 0 | 0 | 0 | 0 | 0 | — | | 0 | 0 |
| Liverpool | 2025–26 | Premier League | 0 | 0 | 0 | 0 | 0 | 0 | 0 | 0 | 0 | 0 | 0 | 0 |
| Liverpool | Total | | 0 | 0 | 0 | 0 | 0 | 0 | 0 | 0 | 0 | 0 | 0 | 0 |
| Liverpool U21 | 2021–22 | — | | | — | | — | | — | | 1 (Note: Appearance(s) in EFL Trophy) | 0 | 1 | 0 |
| Liverpool U21 | 2022–23 | — | | | — | | — | | — | | 2 | 0 | 2 | 0 |
| Liverpool U21 | 2024–25 | — | | | — | | — | | — | | 3 | 0 | 3 | 0 |
| Liverpool U21 | Total | | — | | — | | — | | — | | 6 | 0 | 6 | 0 |
| Crewe Alexandra (loan) | 2023–24 | League Two | 27 | 0 | 3 | 0 | 2 | 0 | — | | 0 | 0 | 32 | 0 |
| Crawley Town (loan) | 2025–26 | League Two | 17 | 0 | 0 | 0 | 1 | 0 | — | | 1 | 0 | 19 | 0 |
| Career total | | | 44 | 0 | 3 | 0 | 3 | 0 | 0 | 0 | 7 | 0 | 57 | 0 |

== Honours ==
Liverpool

- FA Community Shield: 2022

England under-19

- UEFA European Under-19 Championship: 2022
