= Connor Evans (footballer, born 2003) =

Welsh footballer (born 2003)

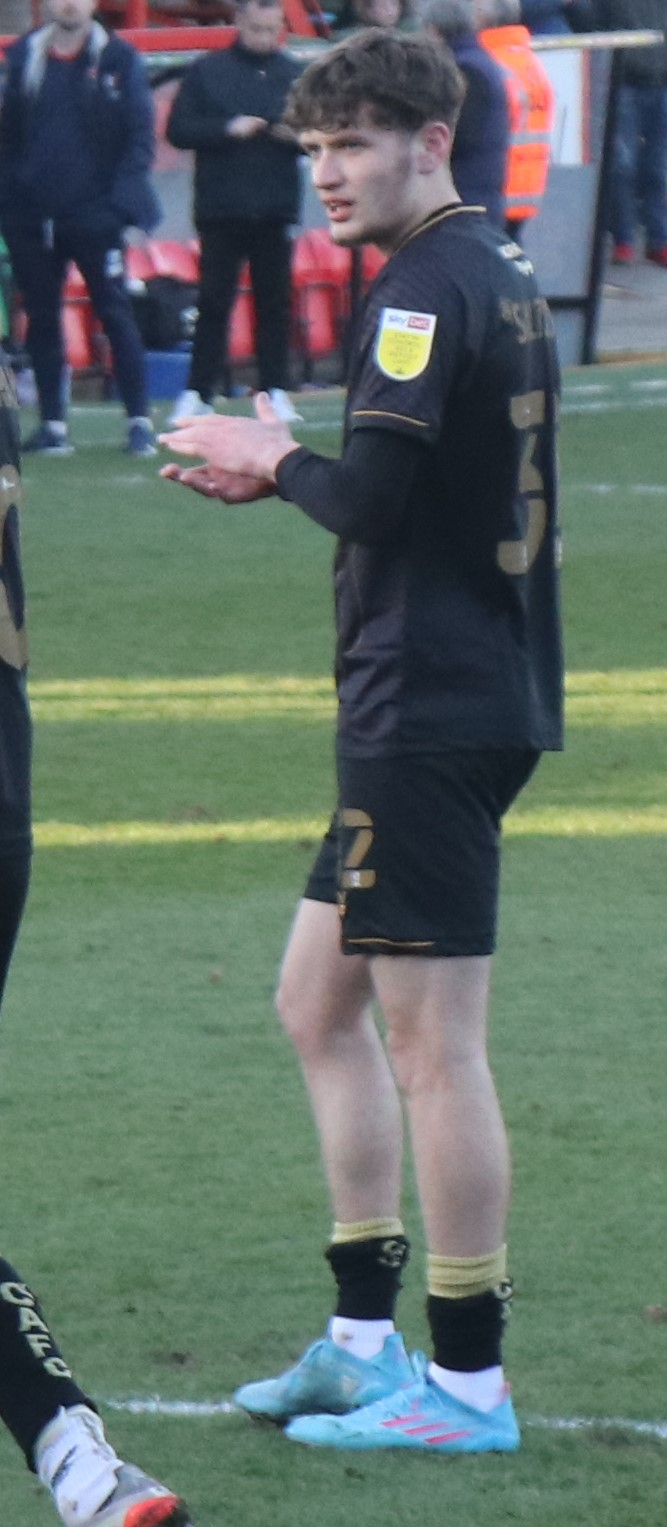
- Evans with Crewe Alexandra in 2022

Personal information
- Full name: Connor Evans
- Date of birth: 27 September 2003 (age 23)
- Height: 6 ft 0 in (1.83 m)
- Position: Striker

Team information
- Current team: Bangor City 1876
- Number: 23

Youth career
- –2021: Crewe Alexandra

Senior career*
Years	Team	Apps	(Gls)
2021–2024	Crewe Alexandra	7	(0)
2022	→ Marine (loan)	9	(2)
2023	→ Nantwich Town (loan)	9	(2)
2023	→ Chester (loan)	4	(0)
2023–2024	→ Marine (loan)	12	(2)
2024	Waterford	13	(0)
2025	Southport	17	(0)
2025–2026	Caernarfon Town		
2026	→ Bala Town (loan)		
2026–	Bangor City 1876	6	(2)

International career^{‡}
2021	Wales U18	1	(0)
- * Club domestic league appearances and goals as of 08:56, 1 September 2026 (UTC) ‡ National team caps and goals as of 20:25, 28 August 2023 (UTC)

Connor Evans (né Salisbury) (born 27 September 2003) is a Welsh professional footballer who plays as a striker for Cymru North side Bangor City 1876.

== Club career ==
Prior to a name change, Salisbury made his Crewe debut, aged 18, on 4 January 2022 in an EFL Trophy knockout game against Rotherham United as an 85th-minute substitute for Regan Griffiths at Gresty Road, and subsequently made five substitute appearances in League games before the end of the season.

On 15 August 2022, Crewe announced that the striker had changed his surname to Evans in order to have the same surname as his mother and stepfather. Having signed his first professional contract earlier in the summer, Crewe said he would "be referred to as Connor Evans in all communications from this point".

On 7 October 2022, Evans joined Marine on an initial one-month loan which was later extended. In February 2023, Evans joined Nantwich Town on loan until the end of the season.

In August 2023, Evans joined Chester on loan until November 2023. Following his return to Crewe, Evans scored his first professional goal in the club's 2–1 win over Newcastle United U21s in an EFL Trophy group stage game on 21 November 2023. Three days later, he returned on loan to Marine, until 10 January 2024.

On 22 February 2024, Evans signed for League of Ireland Premier Division club Waterford. On 12 November 2024, it was announced that Evans had departed the club following the end of his contract.

On 17 January 2025, Evans joined National League North side Southport on a short-term contract. In June 2025, he joined Cymru Premier side Caernarfon Town.

At the end of July 2026 he joined Bangor City 1876.

== International career ==
He played for the Wales under-18s in March 2021 against England.

== Career statistics ==
As of 12 November 2024

Club	Season	Division	League		National cup		League Cup		Other		Total	
Club	Season	Division	Apps	Goals	Apps	Goals	Apps	Goals	Apps	Goals	Apps	Goals
Crewe Alexandra	2021–22	League One	5	0	0	0	0	0	1 (Note: Appearance(s) in the EFL Trophy)	0	6	0
Crewe Alexandra	2022–23	League Two	2	0	0	0	0	0	0	0	2	0
Crewe Alexandra	2023–24	League Two	0	0	0	0	0	0	1	1	1	1
Crewe Alexandra	Total		7	0	0	0	0	0	2	1	9	1
Marine (loan)	2022–23	NPL Premier Division	9	2	—		—		3 (Note: Appearance(s) in the FA Trophy)	0	12	2
Nantwich Town (loan)	2022–23	NPL Premier Division	9	2	—		—		—		9	2
Chester (loan)	2023–24	National League North	4	0	2	0	—		—		6	0
Marine (loan)	2023–24	NPL Premier Division	12	2	—		—		—		12	2
Waterford	2024	LOI Premier Division	13	0	2	0	—		1 (Note: Appearance in the Munster Senior Cup)	1	16	1
Career total			54	6	4	0	0	0	6	2	64	8
