= Charlie Finney =

English footballer

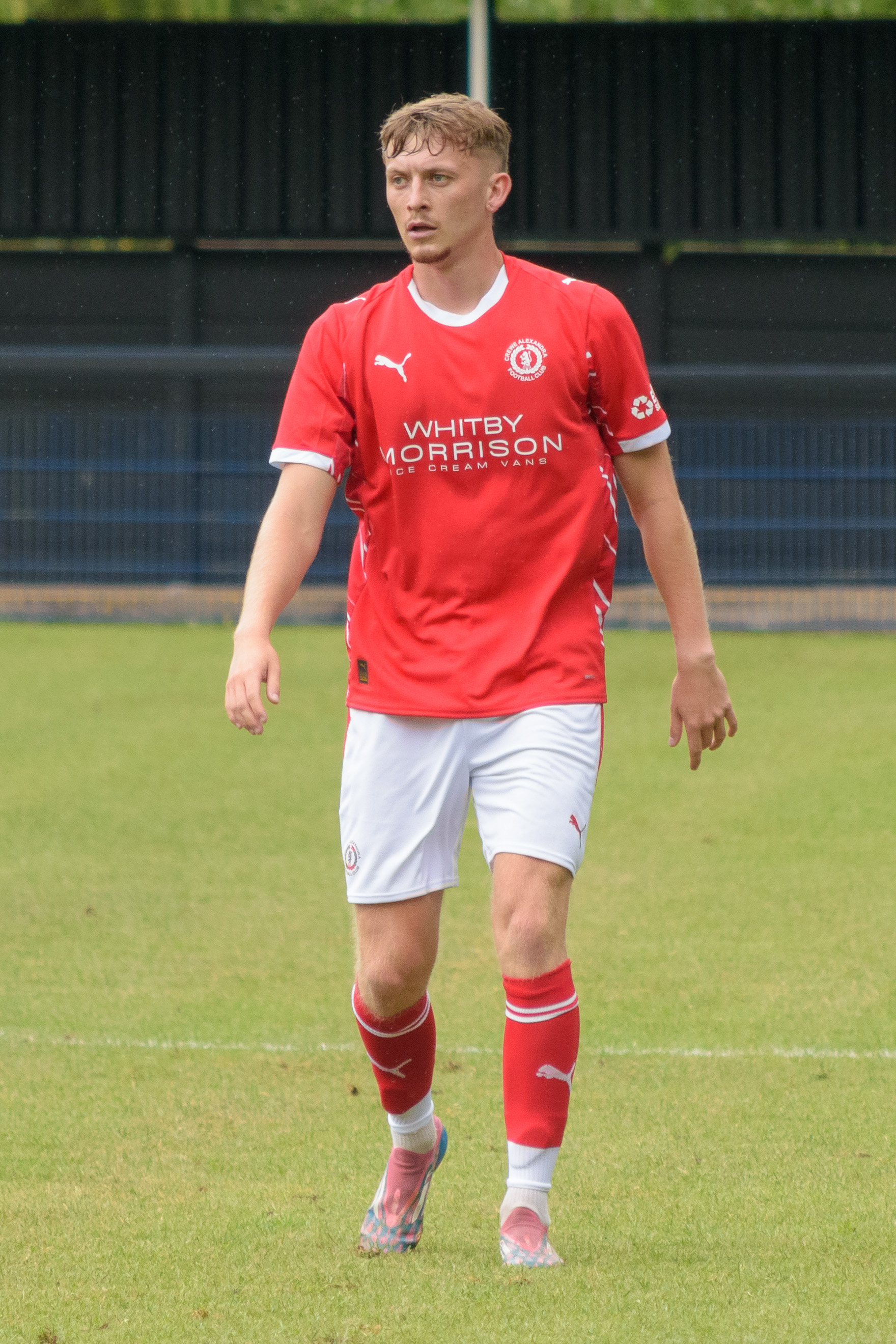
- Finney playing for Crewe Alexandra in 2025

Personal information
- Full name: Charlie Joe Finney
- Date of birth: 28 October 2003 (age 23)
- Place of birth: Crewe, England
- Position: Midfielder

Team information
- Current team: FC United of Manchester

Youth career
- –2021: Crewe Alexandra

Senior career*
Years	Team	Apps	(Gls)
2021–2026	Crewe Alexandra	50	(0)
2023	→ Chorley (loan)	5	(0)
2024	→ Buxton (loan)	0	(0)
2026–	FC United of Manchester	0	(0)
- * Club domestic league appearances and goals as of 10:34, 1 July 2026 (UTC)

Charlie Joe Finney (born 28 October 2003) is an English professional footballer who most recently played as a midfielder for Northern Premier League Premier Division club FC United of Manchester.

== Career ==
=== Crewe Alexandra ===
The younger brother of former Crewe midfielder Oliver Finney, Charlie Finney came through Crewe Alexandra's Academy, signing his first professional deal in July 2021.

He made his Crewe debut on 9 August 2022, starting alongside his brother in Crewe's EFL League Cup first round defeat at Grimsby Town. He made his first league appearance as a substitute on 13 September 2022, supplying the cross for Dan Agyei's equaliser in a 1–1 draw at Hartlepool United.

On 4 March 2023, he joined National League North play-off chasers Chorley on a one-month loan deal. Following his return to Crewe, he was included in the starting line-up for the first time, playing 73 minutes of Crewe's 2–0 league win over Walsall on 15 April 2023. At the end of the season, he was offered a new contract by the club, and in June 2023, signed an initial two-year deal, with an option for a further 12 months. He made a dozen appearances, mainly as a substitute, during the first half of the following season, but in December 2023 manager Lee Bell said Finney required surgery on a persistent calf injury.

In September 2024, Finney joined National League North side Buxton on a five-week loan deal.

In June 2025, Finney signed a new one-year contract, with an option for an additional 12 months, to stay at Crewe. On 13 May 2026, the club said he would be released in the summer when his contract expired.

=== Non-League ===
On 18 September 2026, Finney joined Northern Premier League Premier Division club FC United of Manchester.

== Career statistics ==
As of 19 May 2026.

Appearances and goals by club, season and competition
Club	Season	League			FA Cup		League Cup		Other		Total	
Club	Season	Division	Apps	Goals	Apps	Goals	Apps	Goals	Apps	Goals	Apps	Goals
Crewe Alexandra	2022–23	League Two	9	0	0	0	1	0	3 (Note: Appearances in EFL Trophy)	0	13	0
Crewe Alexandra	2023–24	League Two	10	0	2	0	0	0	3	0	15	0
Crewe Alexandra	2024–25	League Two	10	0	0	0	0	0	3	0	13	0
Crewe Alexandra	2025–26	League Two	21	0	1	0	1	0	3	0	26	0
Crewe Alexandra	Total		50	0	3	0	2	0	12	0	67	0
Chorley (loan)	2022–23	National League North	5	0	0	0	—		0	0	5	0
Buxton (loan)	2024–25	National League North	0	0	2	0	—		0	0	2	0
Career total			55	0	5	0	2	0	12	0	74	0
