= Courtney Baker-Richardson =

English footballer

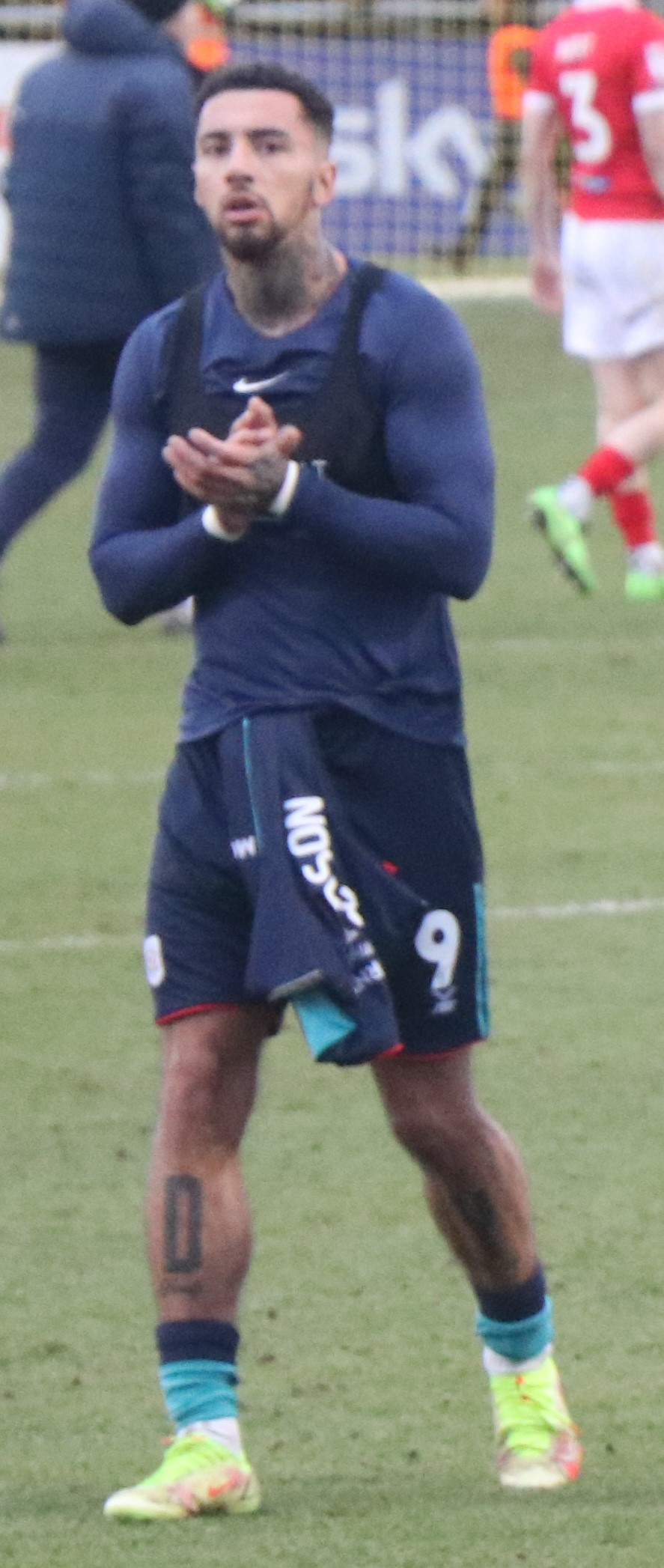
- Baker-Richardson with Crewe Alexandra in 2023

Personal information
- Full name: Courtney Romello Baker-Richardson
- Date of birth: 5 December 1995 (age 30)
- Place of birth: Coventry, England
- Height: 1.88 m (6 ft 2 in)
- Position: Striker

Team information
- Current team: Altrincham (on loan from Tranmere Rovers)

Youth career
- –2013: Coventry City

Senior career*
Years	Team	Apps	(Gls)
2013–2014	Coventry City	0	(0)
2014	→ Tamworth (loan)	1	(0)
2014	→ Ilkeston (loan)	2	(0)
2014–2015	Romulus		
2015	Nuneaton Town	1	(0)
2015	Redditch United	5	(1)
2015–2016	Kettering Town	18	(3)
2016–2017	Leamington	62	(22)
2017–2020	Swansea City	17	(3)
2019–2020	→ Accrington Stanley (loan)	2	(0)
2020–2021	Barrow	0	(0)
2021	→ Barnet (loan)	17	(3)
2021–2022	Newport County	33	(8)
2022–2024	Crewe Alexandra	65	(17)
2024–2026	Newport County	66	(8)
2026–	Tranmere Rovers	2	(0)
2026–	→ Altrincham (loan)	0	(0)
- * Club domestic league appearances and goals as of 17:27, 20 November 2026 (UTC)

Courtney Romello Baker-Richardson (born 5 December 1995) is an English footballer who plays as a forward for Altrincham, on loan from EFL League Two club Tranmere Rovers.

== Club career ==
=== Coventry City ===
Baker-Richardson made his professional debut with Coventry City as a substitute on 7 December 2013 in a 1–1 FA Cup Second Round draw with Hartlepool United, coming on to replace Franck Moussa after 71 minutes.

=== Non-league ===
On 20 February 2014, Baker-Richardson joined Conference side Tamworth on a youth loan. He made his debut on 22 February 2014, coming on in the 68th minute for Lee Hildreth in the 1–1 draw against Welling United. He subsequently joined Northern Premier League Premier Division team Ilkeston on loan in March 2014.

On Friday 7 August 2015, Baker-Richardson signed for Southern League Premier side Kettering Town for the 2015–16 season. However following a bad injury in October that year he was ignored by manager Marcus Law and switched to fellow Southern League Premier team Leamington in February 2016.

After a successful 2016–17 season with Leamington, Baker-Richardson went on trial with Premier League team Leicester City in August 2017.

=== Swansea City ===
On 14 August 2017, Baker-Richardson joined Premier League side Swansea City on a two-year deal. He made his debut for Swansea on 28 August 2018 in a 1–0 defeat to Crystal Palace in the EFL Cup. He scored his first goal for the club on 29 September 2018 during a 3–0 win over Queens Park Rangers

On 9 August 2019, Baker-Richardson joined Accrington Stanley on loan until the end of the season.

=== Barrow ===
On 8 October 2020, following release from Swansea, Baker-Richardson joined League Two side Barrow on a free transfer. On 28 January 2021, he joined Barnet on loan for the rest of the season. He was released by Barrow at the end of the season.

=== Newport County ===
In June 2021 he joined Newport County on a one-year deal for the 2021-22 season. He made his debut for Newport in the 2-1 League Two win against Walsall on 18 September 2021. Baker-Richardson scored his first goal for Newport on 2 October 2021 in the 3-0 League Two win against Scunthorpe United.

=== Crewe Alexandra ===
On 31 May 2022, it was reported that Baker-Richardson was joining Crewe Alexandra, newly relegated to League Two, on a two-year deal. He made a substitute appearance in Crewe's opening game of the 2022–23 season, a 2–1 victory over Rochdale at Spotland on 30 July 2022, and, after again coming on as a second-half substitute, scored his first Crewe goal in the following game, a 3–0 win over Harrogate Town at Gresty Road on 6 August 2022. He made his first Crewe start on 9 August 2022, playing in an EFL League Cup first round defeat at Grimsby Town. Baker-Richardson then scored three times in two home league games, one against Sutton United on 16 August and a first-half brace against Northampton Town on 20 August 2022. He missed Crewe's match at Carlisle United on 1 October 2022 after injuring his leg while playing Xbox, but recovered to play six games in October, scoring once, before sustaining a serious hamstring injury. He eventually returned to first-team action on 4 March 2023, coming on as a 71st minute substitute in a 1–1 draw at Sutton United, finishing the season with nine goals in 32 matches.

In the 2023–24 season, Baker-Richardson beat his previous season's tally, scoring ten times in 40 appearances before incurring a dislocated shoulder at the start of Crewe's 1–0 victory over Sutton United at Gresty Road on 12 March 2024, ruling him out for six weeks. He made a substitute appearance in Crewe's final game of the regular season at Colchester United on 27 April 2024. Having helped the club reach the League 2 play-off final in May 2024, Baker-Richardson was offered a new contract by Crewe.

=== Newport County return ===
On 10 July 2024, Baker-Richardson returned to League Two side Newport County on a two-year deal. He was released by the club at the end of the 2025–26 season.

=== Tranmere Rovers ===
On 30 July 2026, Baker-Richardson joined Tranmere Rovers in a one-year deal.

On 20 November 2026, Baker-Richardson joined National League side Altrincham on a one-month loan deal.

== Career statistics ==
As of match played 10 November 2026

Appearances and goals by club, season and competition
Club	Season	League			FA Cup		League Cup		Other		Total	
Club	Season	Division	Apps	Goals	Apps	Goals	Apps	Goals	Apps	Goals	Apps	Goals
Coventry City	2013–14	League One	0	0	1	0	0	0	0	0	1	0
Tamworth (loan)	2013–14	Conference Premier	1	0	0	0	—		1 (Note: Includes appearance/s and goal/s in the Birmingham Senior Cup.)	0	2	0
Ilkeston (loan)	2013–14	Northern Premier League Premier Division	2	0	0	0	—		0	0	2	0
Nuneaton Town	2014–15	Conference Premier	1	0	0	0	—		0	0	1	0
Redditch United	2014–15	Southern League Premier Division	5	1	0	0	—		0	0	5	1
Kettering Town	2015–16	Southern League Premier Division	18	3	4	3	—		2 (Note: Includes appearance and goal in the Southern Football League Cup and appearance in the Northamptonshire Senior Cup.)	1	24	7
Leamington	2016–17	Southern League Premier Division	17	5	0	0	—		2 (Note: Includes appearance/s and goal/s in the Southern League Premier Division play-offs.)	2	19	7
Leamington	2017–18	Southern League Premier Division	45	17	0	0	—		10 (Note: Includes 5 appearances and 2 goals in the Birmingham Senior Cup, 2 appearances and 1 goal in the Southern Football League Cup, 2 appearances and 1 goal in the Southern League Premier Division play-offs and 1 appearance in the FA Trophy.)	4	55	21
Leamington	Total		62	22	0	0	—		12	6	74	28
Swansea City	2017–18	Premier League	0	0	0	0	0	0	0	0	0	0
Swansea City	2018–19	Championship	17	3	3	1	1	0	0	0	21	4
Swansea City	2019–20	Championship	0	0	0	0	0	0	0	0	0	0
Swansea City	Total		17	3	3	1	1	0	0	0	21	4
Swansea City U21s	2017–18	—			—		—		4 (Note: Includes appearance/s and goal/s in the EFL Trophy.)	0	4	0
Accrington Stanley (loan)	2019–20	League One	2	0	0	0	1	0	1	1	4	1
Barrow	2020–21	League Two	0	0	0	0	0	0	0	0	0	0
Barnet (loan)	2020–21	National League	17	3	0	0	—		0	0	17	3
Newport County	2021–22	League Two	31	8	1	0	0	0	0	0	32	8
Crewe Alexandra	2022–23	League Two	29	8	0	0	1	0	2	1	32	9
Crewe Alexandra	2023–24	League Two	36	9	3	1	1	0	4 (Note: Includes one appearance in the EFL Trophy and three EFL League 2 play-off appearances.)	0	44	10
Crewe Alexandra	Total		65	17	3	1	2	0	6	1	76	19
Newport County	2024–25	League Two	36	4	1	0	1	0	2	1	40	4
Newport County	2025–26	League Two	30	4	1	0	2	0	2	0	35	4
Newport County	Total		66	8	2	0	3	0	4	0	75	8
Tranmere Rovers	2026–27	League Two	2	0	0	0	1	0	2	0	5	0
Career total			290	66	14	5	8	0	32	8	344	79
