= Regan Griffiths =

English footballer (born 2000)

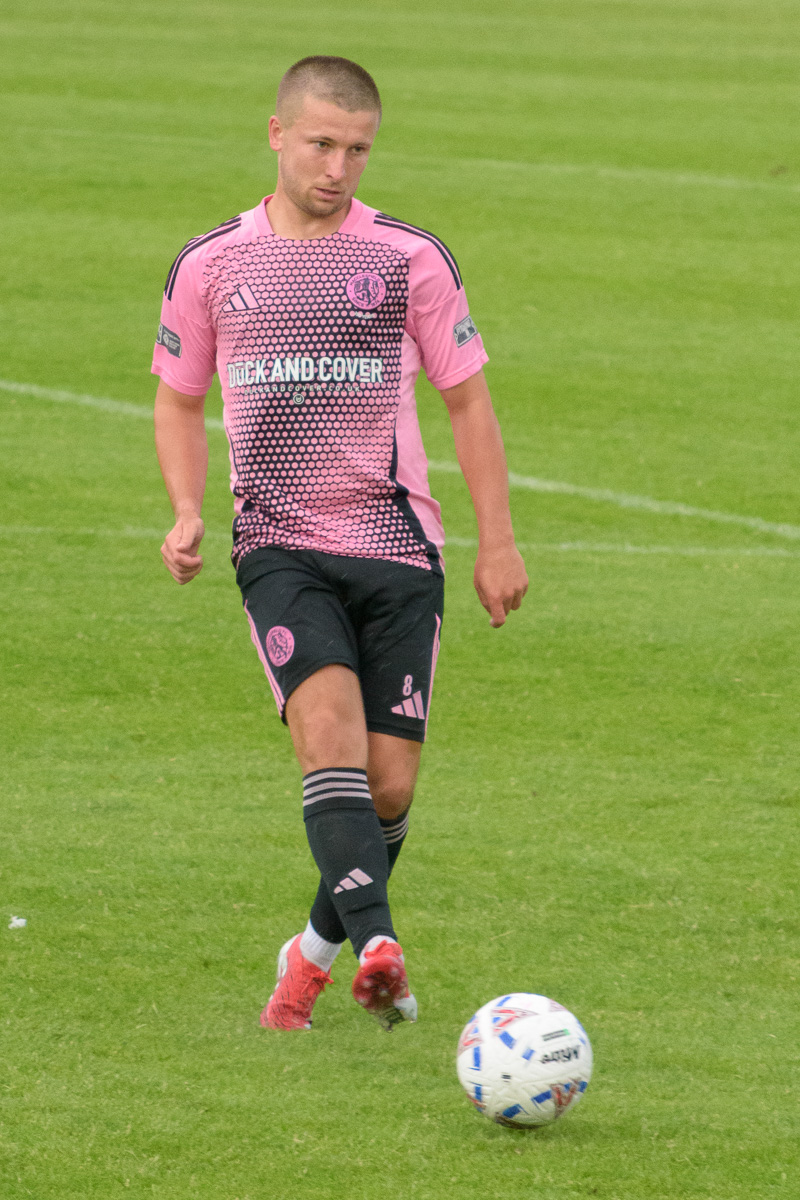
- Griffiths playing for Macclesfield in 2025

Personal information
- Full name: Regan Jon Griffiths
- Date of birth: 1 May 2000 (age 26)
- Place of birth: Huyton, England
- Height: 5 ft 11 in (1.81 m)
- Position: Midfielder

Team information
- Current team: Macclesfield

Youth career
- –2018: Crewe Alexandra

Senior career*
Years	Team	Apps	(Gls)
2018–2024	Crewe Alexandra	41	(0)
2020	→ Kidsgrove Athletic (loan)		
2020	→ Witton Albion (loan)		
2020	→ Notts County (loan)	11	(0)
2023	→ Boreham Wood (loan)	5	(0)
2024	Kidderminster Harriers	11	(0)
2024–2025	Marine	10	(0)
2025	Altrincham	2	(0)
2025–	Macclesfield	11	(0)
- * Club domestic league appearances and goals as of 29 November 2025

Regan Jon Griffiths (born 1 May 2000) is an English footballer who plays as a midfielder for National League North club Macclesfield.

== Career ==
=== Crewe Alexandra ===
A graduate of Crewe Alexandra's Academy, he signed a professional contract in 2018. In February 2020, he joined Kidsgrove Athletic on a month-long loan before having a similar spell at Witton Albion in October that year. The following month, on 10 November 2020, Griffiths made his Crewe debut in an EFL Trophy group game against Shrewsbury Town. Griffiths made his League One debut at Portsmouth in a 4–1 defeat on 21 November 2020.

On 31 March 2021, Griffiths joined Notts County on loan to the end of their National League season, making his debut in a 1–0 win over Wrexham on 2 April 2021, and ultimately making 12 appearances as County reached, but lost, a National League play-off semi-final on 12 June 2021.

Meanwhile, on 13 May 2021, Crewe announced that it had offered Griffiths a new contract; on 18 June 2021, Griffiths signed a new two-year deal through to summer 2023. On 4 May 2022, Crewe announced Griffiths had accepted a new deal until 2024.

On 1 September 2023, Griffiths and team-mate Billy Sass-Davies joined National League side Boreham Wood on loan deals running to 31 January 2024. He made his debut on 2 September 2023, in a 1–0 home defeat by Barnet. On 10 January 2024, he was released from his Crewe contract by mutual consent.

=== Kidderminster Harriers ===
On 12 February 2024, it was announced he had signed for National League side Kidderminster Harriers. He made his Harriers debut on 17 February 2024 in the side's goalless draw against Dorking Wanderers.

=== Marine ===
In July 2024, Griffiths was signed by National League North side Marine.

=== Altrincham ===
He left Marine by mutual consent on 10 January 2025, and, on 28 January 2025, joined National League side Altrincham, making his debut in a 2–1 National League Cup victory over Wolverhampton Wanderers' under-21s later the same day.

=== Macclesfield ===
In July 2025, Griffiths signed for National League North side Macclesfield.

== Career statistics ==
As of match played 7 December 2025

Appearances and goals by club, season and competition
Club	Season	League			FA Cup		League Cup		Other		Total	
Club	Season	Division	Apps	Goals	Apps	Goals	Apps	Goals	Apps	Goals	Apps	Goals
Crewe Alexandra	2020–21	League One	2	0	0	0	0	0	2 (Note: Appearances in EFL Trophy)	0	4	0
Crewe Alexandra	2021–22	League One	21	0	0	0	1	0	4	0	26	0
Crewe Alexandra	2022–23	League Two	16	0	0	0	1	0	2	0	19	0
Crewe Alexandra	2023–24	League Two	2	0	0	0	1	0	0	0	3	0
Crewe Alexandra	Total		41	0	0	0	3	0	8	0	52	0
Notts County (loan)	2020–21	National League	11	0	0	0	0	0	1 (Note: Appearance in National League play-off semi-final)	0	12	0
Boreham Wood (loan)	2023–24	National League	5	0	0	0	0	0	0	0	5	0
Kidderminster Harriers	2023–24	National League	11	0	0	0	0	0	0	0	11	0
Marine	2024–25	National League North	10	0	1	0	0	0	0	0	11	0
Altrincham	2024–25	National League	2	0	0	0	0	0	2 (Note: Appearances in National League Cup)	0	4	0
Macclesfield Town	2025–25	National League North	11	0	2	1	0	0	0	0	13	1
Career total			91	0	3	1	3	0	11	0	108	1
