= Owen Lunt =

English footballer (born 2004)

Personal information
- Full name: Owen Alan Lunt
- Date of birth: 2 September 2004 (age 22)
- Place of birth: Runcorn, England
- Height: 5 ft 10 in (1.77 m)
- Position: Midfielder

Team information
- Current team: Crewe Alexandra
- Number: 19

Youth career
- 2014–2022: Crewe Alexandra

Senior career*
Years	Team	Apps	(Gls)
2022–	Crewe Alexandra	60	(2)
2025	→ Southport (loan)	14	(1)
- * Club domestic league appearances and goals as of 16:36, 21 November 2026 (UTC)

Owen Alan Lunt (born 2 September 2004) is a professional footballer who plays as a midfielder for EFL League Two club Crewe Alexandra.

== Club career ==
Having joined the club aged ten, Lunt come through the Crewe Alexandra academy system, and made his debut for the club at the age of 18 as a scholar in their EFL Trophy game against Leeds United U21 at Gresty Road on 1 November 2022, coming on as a 72nd-minute substitute for Lachlan Brook, as the Railwaymen won 2–1 on penalties; following a goalless 90 minutes. On 2 July 2023, he signed his first professional contract with the club, agreeing a one-year deal. In October 2023, following a game against Tranmere Rovers; Lunt picked up a back injury and by January 2024, he was still struggling with the pain in his back.

On 28 March 2024, Lunt signed a new one-year deal valid under 2025; with the club holding the option to extend for a further year. On 13 August 2024; following 10 months out with a spinal injury, Lunt made his Crewe return during a 2–1 defeat against Rotherham United in the EFL Cup, playing 68 minutes before being replaced by Max Sanders.

On 31 January 2025, Lunt joined National League North side Southport on loan for a month, on 1 March, the deal was extended until the end of the season. On 8 April, Lunt was recalled by parent club, Crewe after making fourteen appearances, scoring once for The Sandgrounders. After his loan spell, on 18 April 2025 away to Colchester United, he was sent off for a straight red card for a kick against Tom Flanagan before half time in a game that finished 0–0.

In June 2025, Lunt signed a new one-year contract, with an option for an additional 12 months, to stay at Crewe. On 19 September, he was given a two-match ban for simulating contact to win a penalty kick in a 2–1 home loss to Barnet. He scored his first senior goal for Crewe on 8 November to open a 2–1 win over Shrewsbury Town at Gresty Road; manager Lee Bell said it was "brilliantly taken" and that he had "been onto him about getting goals". In the return match at The Hive Lunt scored his second league goal for the season to help secure a 1–1 draw against Barnet where he was previously sent off.

In August 2026, Lunt has signed a new two-year deal at Crewe.

== Personal life ==
Lunt is the nephew of ex-Crewe, Sheffield Wednesday and Hereford United midfielder Kenny Lunt - currently the player development manager at The Railwaymen.

== Career statistics ==
As of 21 November 2026

Appearances and goals by club, season and competition
Club	Season	Division	League		FA Cup		League Cup		Other		Total	
Club	Season	Division	Apps	Goals	Apps	Goals	Apps	Goals	Apps	Goals	Apps	Goals
Crewe Alexandra	2022–23	League Two	0	0	0	0	0	0	1 (Note: Appearances in EFL Trophy)	0	1	0
Crewe Alexandra	2023–24	League Two	3	0	0	0	1	0	2	0	6	0
Crewe Alexandra	2024–25	League Two	17	0	1	0	1	0	4	0	23	0
Crewe Alexandra	2025–26	League Two	31	2	1	0	1	0	2	0	35	2
Crewe Alexandra	2026–27	League Two	9	0	1	0	0	0	2	0	12	0
Total			60	2	3	0	3	0	11	0	77	2
Southport (loan)	2024–25	National League North	14	1	0	0	0	0	0	0	14	1
Career total			74	3	3	0	3	0	11	0	91	3
