= Crewe Alexandra F.C. Academy =

Coordinates: 53°04′19″N 2°26′39″W

The Crewe Alexandra F.C. Academy is the player development centre of English Football League club Crewe Alexandra F.C. Set up by manager Dario Gradi in the late 1980s, it achieved official status as an FA Youth Academy in the late 1990s. By concentrating on developing its own players the club remained profitable (a rare thing in lower-division football at the time) by selling them on after they have gained experience with Crewe. The Academy is known to stress technical excellence, which accords with the aim to have the first team play attractive, passing football. Academy graduates include full England internationals Rob Jones, Danny Murphy, Seth Johnson and Dean Ashton and Wales international David Vaughan, plus the club's current manager (Lee Bell) and previous manager (Alex Morris).

== History ==
During the late 1980s, Gradi and club chairman John Bowler got the local council to contribute to the costs of an all-weather pitch on waste ground to the south of Gresty Road. This formed the starting point for a youth coaching facility managed by Bill Prendergast, which by the early 1990s was coaching 120 youngsters every week. In 1995, Crewe leased a 20-acre site at Reaseheath, near Nantwich, planning a £750,000 training and player development facility largely funded by transfer sales: since 1983, Crewe had raised £3 million in fees while expending just £200,000. A year later, in 1996, Crewe received a lottery grant to develop a youth coaching facility in nearby Shavington (which eventually replaced the Gresty Road all-weather pitch, removed during redevelopment of Crewe's main stand in 1999-2000). By 2015, player sales had generated over £20 million which had largely been invested in modernising Gresty Road and in developing its Academy set-up. Crewe was the only club outside the top two divisions to have a Category Two academy club.

Players who passed through the ranks at Crewe include the England international players Geoff Thomas and David Platt and Welshman Robbie Savage, and Northern Ireland internationals Neil Lennon and Steve Jones (Platt was the most successful, totalling more than £20 million in transfers and captaining the England team). All these were youngsters signed from other clubs, but Gradi also had considerable success in nurturing Crewe's own trainees - notably full England internationals Rob Jones, Danny Murphy, Seth Johnson and Dean Ashton and Wales international David Vaughan.

Over 100 former youth players have made it into the first team at Crewe. In April 2013, in the team's final game of the season, manager Steve Davis fielded a team whose starting 11 were all Crewe Academy graduates. This feat was repeated five years later by Davis's successor David Artell (formerly operations manager at the Academy) on 5 May 2018.

In April 2022, Artell's immediate successor as Crewe manager, Alex Morris, became the first Academy graduate to manage the club's first team, with another graduate, Lee Bell, as assistant. Bell's predecessor as assistant manager, Kenny Lunt, was also an Academy graduate. In November 2022, after Morris stepped down for compassionate reasons to become assistant manager, Bell was appointed as Crewe manager, becoming the second Academy graduate to manage the club.

In 2020–2021, Crewe's academy was ranked 11th highest of 82 in England and Wales, and was the highest ranked Category 2 Academy, in terms of producing players who had made league appearances. In 2021–2022, the academy climbed to 9th overall, ahead of Liverpool's academy.

In April 2026, the club announced it was restructuring its academy operation due to increasing financial and operational demands, and would be transitioning to Category 3, from the beginning of 2026/27.

== Notable graduates ==
Players highlighted in bold have gained international caps for their countries. Players who were signed straight to the first team from elsewhere are not included (such as former internationals Neil Lennon, David Platt, Robbie Savage, and Geoff Thomas).

- (England) Rio Adebisi
- (Nigeria) Dele Adebola
- (Wales) Calum Agius
- (England) Callum Ainley
- (England) Ben Amos
- (England) **Dean Ashton**
- (England) Ryan Austin
- (England) James Bailey
- (England) James Baillie
- (England) Lee Bell
- (England) Paul Bignot
- (England) Lewis Billington
- (England) Tom Booth
- (England) Junior Brown
- (England) Mark Carrington
- (England) Max Clayton
- (England) Chris Clements
- (England) George Cooper
- (England) Ryan Colclough
- (England) Neil Critchley
- (England) Owen Dale
- (England) Brendon Daniels
- (England) Harry Davis
- (England) Maurice Doyle
- (England) Adam Dugdale
- (England) Chey Dunkley
- (England) Paul Edwards
- (England) Rob Edwards
- (Wales) Connor Evans
- (England) Gareth Evans
- (England) Nick Farquharson
- (England) Charlie Finney
- (England) Oliver Finney
- (England) Christopher Flynn
- (England) Stephen Foster
- (England) Ben Garratt
- (England) Steve Garvey
- (England) John Grant
- (England) Regan Griffiths
- (England) Michael Higdon
- (Slovakia) Matúš Holíček
- (England) Caspar Hughes
- (England) Rob Hulse
- (England) Michael Jackson
- (England) Eddie Johnson
- (England) **Seth Johnson**
- (England) Travis Johnson
- (England) Billy Jones
- (Scotland) James Jones
- (England) **Rob Jones**
- (England) Charlie Kirk
- (England) Scott Leather
- (England) A-Jay Leitch-Smith
- (Wales) Tom Lowery
- (Northern Ireland) **Matthew Lund**
- (England) Josh Lundstram
- (England) Kenny Lunt
- (England) Joe Lynch
- (England) Nicky Maynard
- (England) Ben Marshall
- (England) Chris McCready
- (England) Shaun Miller
- (England) Byron Moore
- (England) Alex Morris
- (England) Toby Mullarkey
- (England) **Danny Murphy**
- (England) Luke Murphy
- (England) Perry Ng
- (Northern Ireland) Liam Nolan
- (England) George Nunn
- (Northern Ireland) **Michael O'Connor**
- (England) Luke Offord
- (Republic of Ireland) Connor O'Riordan
- (England) Jason Oswell
- (England) Harry Pickering
- (England) Tom Pope
- (England) Nick Powell
- (England) George Ray
- (England) Paul Rennie
- (England) Lewis Reilly
- (England) Mark Rivers
- (England) Ben Rix
- (England) Joe Robbins
- (England) Gary Roberts
- (England) Mark Roberts
- (England) James Robinson
- (Wales) Billy Sass-Davies
- (Wales) Callum Saunders
- (England) Danny Shelley
- (Wales) Peter Smith
- (England) Neil Sorvel
- (England) Kevin Street
- (England) Ritchie Sutton
- (England) Joel Tabiner
- (England) Stuart Tomlinson
- (England) Matthew Tootle
- (England) Daniel Trickett-Smith
- (England) Ollie Turton
- (Wales) **David Vaughan**
- (England) Richard Walker
- (England) Steve Walters
- (England) Billy Waters
- (England) Ashley Westwood
- (England) Gareth Whalley
- (Wales) **Owain Fôn Williams**
- (Wales) Zac Williams
- (England) Kyle Wilson
- (England) Andy Woodward
- (England) Nathan Woodthorpe
- (England) David Wright
- (England) Adam Yates
