= 2025–26 Crewe Alexandra F.C. season =

149th season in existence of Crewe Alexandra FC

Crewe Alexandra
2025–26 season
- Chairman: Charles Grant
- Manager: Lee Bell
- Stadium: Gresty Road
- League Two: 10th
- FA Cup: First round
- EFL Cup: First round
- EFL Trophy: Round of 32
- Top goalscorer: League: Josh March (11 goals); All: Emre Tezgel (15 goals)
- Highest home attendance: 9,125 vs Bristol Rovers (19 December 2025, League Two)
- Lowest home attendance: 961 vs Chesterfield (2 September 2025, EFL Trophy)
- Average home league attendance: 5,607
- Biggest win: 7–1 vs Chesterfield (H) (2 September 2025, EFL Trophy)
- Biggest defeat: 0-3 vs Swindon Town (H) (30 August 2025, League Two); 0-3 vs Walsall (H) (14 March 2026, League Two)
| Home colours | Away colours | Third colours |

The 2025–26 season is the 149th season in the history of Crewe Alexandra Football Club and their fourth consecutive season in League Two. The club are participating in League Two, the FA Cup, the EFL Cup, and the EFL Trophy.

== Transfers and contracts ==
=== In ===
| Date | Pos. | Player | From | Fee | Ref. |
|---|---|---|---|---|---|
| 25 June 2025 | CB | (England) Phil Croker | (England) Oxford City | Undisclosed | |
| 30 June 2025 | LB | (England) Reece Hutchinson | (Republic of Ireland) Sligo Rovers | Undisclosed | |
| 1 July 2025 (Note: The transfer was announced on 22 May, and would become official on 1 July once his Harrogate contract had ended) | CF | (England) Josh March | (England) Harrogate Town | Bosman | |
| 24 July 2025 | CF | (England) Louis Moult | (Scotland) Dundee United | Bosman | |
| 2 September 2025 | RW | (England) Dion Rankine | (England) Wigan Athletic | Bosman | |
| 10 January 2026 | GK | (Republic of Ireland) Ian Lawlor | (England) Doncaster Rovers | Free Transfer | |

=== Out ===
| Date | Pos. | Player | To | Fee | Ref. |

=== Loaned in ===
| Date | Pos. | Player | From | Date until | Ref. |
|---|---|---|---|---|---|
| 11 July 2025 | GK | (England) Sam Waller | (England) Burnley | 12 January 2026 (Note: On 12 January, Waller's initial season-long from Burnley was terminated) | |
| 15 July 2025 | CAM | (England) Tommi O'Reilly | (England) Aston Villa | 31 May 2026 | |
| 24 July 2025 | CF | (England) Emre Tezgel | (England) Stoke City | 31 May 2026 | |
| 11 August 2025 | CB | (Republic of Ireland) James Golding | (England) Oxford United | 3 January 2026 (Note: On 3 January, Golding was recalled to his parent club Oxford) | |
| 1 September 2025 | CDM | (England) Harvey Griffiths | (England) Wolverhampton Wanderers | 31 May 2026 | |
| 1 September 2025 | RB | (England) Jay Mingi | (England) Stockport County | 23 January 2026 (Note: On 23 January, Mingi's initial season-long loan from Stockport County was terminated) | |
| 3 January 2026 | CB | (England) Alfie Pond | (England) Wolverhampton Wanderers | 31 May 2026 | |

=== Loaned out ===
| Date | Pos. | Player | To | Date until | Ref. |
|---|---|---|---|---|---|
| 30 July 2025 | RW | (England) Fin Roberts | (England) Chester | 31 May 2026 | |
| 12 August 2025 | CB | (Wales) Zac Williams | (Scotland) Kilmarnock | 31 May 2026 | |
| 25 August 2025 | CF | (England) Jordan Hodkin | (England) Leek Town | | |
| 4 October 2025 | CF | (Republic of Ireland) Adrien Thibaut | (England) Southport | 3 December 2025 (Note: On 3 December, Thibaut was recalled from his loan at Southport) | |
| 31 December 2025 | RB | (England) Billy Baker | (England) Newcastle Town | 28 January 2026 | |
| 31 December 2025 | CB | (England) Isaac Irwin | (England) Newcastle Town | 28 January 2026 | |
| 16 January 2026 | CB | (England) Phil Croker | (England) Chester | 31 May 2026 (Note: On 17 February, Croker's loan at Chester was extended until the end of the season) | |
| 23 January 2026 | CF | (England) Jordan Hodkin | (England) Nantwich Town | 21 February 2026 | |
| 28 February 2026 | CF | (England) Jordan Hodkin | (England) Bamber Bridge | 31 May 2026 | |

=== Released / out of contract ===
| Date | Pos. | Player | Subsequent club | Join date | Ref. |
|---|---|---|---|---|---|
| 30 June 2025 | RB | (England) Ryan Cooney | (Northern Ireland) Glentoran | 14 July 2025 | |
| 30 June 2025 | CF | (England) Kane Hemmings | (England) Barrow | 24 July 2025 | |
| 30 June 2025 | CF | (England) Chris Long | (Australia) Brisbane Roar | 24 July 2025 | |
| 30 June 2025 | LB | (England) Lucas Sant | | | |
| 16 July 2025 | CB | (England) Nathan Robinson | | | |

=== New contract ===
| Date | Pos. | Player | Contract until | Ref. |
|---|---|---|---|---|
| 3 June 2025 | GK | (England) Tom Booth | 30 June 2027 | |
| 3 June 2025 | DM | (England) Owen Lunt | 30 June 2026 (Note: Option for a further year) | |
| 10 June 2025 | CM | (England) Oliver Armstrong | 30 June 2026 (Note: First professional contract) | |
| 16 June 2025 | CF | (England) Jordan Hodkin | 30 June 2026 | |
| 18 June 2025 | LB | (England) Charlie Finney | 30 June 2026 | |
| 26 June 2025 | RB | (England) Stan Dancey | 30 June 2026 | |
| 26 June 2025 | CM | (England) Luca Moore | 30 June 2026 | |
| 16 July 2025 | RW | (England) Shilow Tracey | 30 June 2026 | |
| 12 August 2025 | CB | (Wales) Zac Williams | Undisclosed | |
| 19 March 2026 | CB | (England) Mickey Demetriou | 30 June 2027 | |

== Pre-season and friendlies ==
On 29 May, Crewe Alexandra announced five pre-season friendlies, against Kidsgrove Athletic, Newcastle Town, Ashton United, Radcliffe and Southport. Two further friendlies were confirmed in June, against Stoke City and Birmingham City

Win Draw Loss Fixtures

| 5 July 2025 Friendly | Kidsgrove Athletic | 0–6 | Crewe Alexandra | Kidsgrove |
| 15:00 BST | | Report | Tabiner 9', 36'; Trialist 34'; March 75'; Croker 78'; Holíček 86' | Stadium: Hollinwood Road |

| 8 July 2025 Friendly | Newcastle Town | 1–7 | Crewe Alexandra | Newcastle-under-Lyme |
| 19:30 BST | Whitney 59' (pen.) | Report | Billington 11'; Thomas 23'; Connolly 42'; Moore 52', 54'; March 62' (pen.), 81' | Stadium: Lyme Valley Stadium |

| 12 July 2025 Friendly | Ashton United | 0–5 | Crewe Alexandra | Ashton-under-Lyne |
| 13:30 BST | | Report | March 2'; Agius 21'; Trialist 68', 84'; Roberts 87' | Stadium: Hurst Cross |

| 15 July 2025 Friendly | Radcliffe | 1–5 | Crewe Alexandra | Radcliffe |
| 19:45 BST | Riley 86' | Report | Sanders 64'; Billington 66'; Connolly 77'; March 78' (pen.); Agius 85' | Stadium: Stainton Park |

| 19 July 2025 Friendly | Crewe Alexandra | 4–0 | Birmingham City | Crewe |
| 15:00 BST | Agius 11'; March 33', 49' (pen.); Moore 89' | Report | | Stadium: Gresty Road |

| 23 July 2025 Friendly | Crewe Alexandra | 1–2 | Stoke City | Crewe |
| 19:30 BST | March 10' (pen.) | Report | Lawal 21'; Thomas 34' | Stadium: Gresty Road; Attendance: 5,237 |

| 26 July 2025 Friendly | Southport | 2–1 | Crewe Alexandra | Blowick |
| 15:00 BST | Gnahoua 40'; Burgess 45' | Report | Agius 79' (pen.) | Stadium: Haig Avenue |

== Competitions ==
=== League Two ===
==== League table ====
| Pos | Team | Pld | W | D | L | GF | GA | GD | Pts |
|---|---|---|---|---|---|---|---|---|---|
| 9 | Swindon Town | 46 | 22 | 9 | 15 | 70 | 59 | +11 | 75 |
| 10 | Oldham Athletic | 46 | 18 | 14 | 14 | 60 | 44 | +16 | 68 |
| 11 | Crewe Alexandra | 46 | 19 | 10 | 17 | 64 | 58 | +6 | 67 |
| 12 | Colchester United | 46 | 18 | 12 | 16 | 62 | 49 | +13 | 66 |
| 13 | Walsall | 46 | 18 | 11 | 17 | 56 | 56 | 0 | 65 |

Source: EFL Official Website
Rules for classification: 1) Points; 2) Goal difference; 3) Number of goals scored; 4) Head-to-head results; 5) Wins; 6) Away goals; 7) Penalty points (sec 9.5); 8) 12-point sending off offences

==== Results summary ====
| Overall | | | | | | | | Home | | | | | | Away | | | | | |
| Pld | W | D | L | GF | GA | GD | Pts | W | D | L | GF | GA | GD | W | D | L | GF | GA | GD |
|---|---|---|---|---|---|---|---|---|---|---|---|---|---|---|---|---|---|---|---|
| 46 | 19 | 10 | 17 | 64 | 58 | +6 | 67 | 12 | 5 | 5 | 34 | 25 | +9 | 7 | 5 | 12 | 30 | 33 | −3 |

Last updated: complete.
Source: Soccerway

==== Results by round ====
| Round | 1 | 2 | 3 | 4 | 5 | 6 | 7 | 8 | 9 | 10 | 11 | 12 | 13 | 14 | 15 | 16 | 17 | 18 | 19 | 20 | 21 | 22 | 23 | 24 | 26 | 27 | 28 | 29 | 30 | 25^{1} | 31 | 32 | 33 | 34 | 35 | 36 | 37 | 38 | 39 | 40 | 41 | 42 | 43 | 44 | 45 | 46 |
|---|---|---|---|---|---|---|---|---|---|---|---|---|---|---|---|---|---|---|---|---|---|---|---|---|---|---|---|---|---|---|---|---|---|---|---|---|---|---|---|---|---|---|---|---|---|---|
| Ground | A | H | H | A | A | H | A | H | A | H | A | H | A | H | H | A | H | A | H | A | H | A | A | H | H | H | A | A | H | A | A | H | H | A | H | A | H | A | A | H | A | H | A | H | A | H |
| Result | W | W | W | W | L | L | D | L | L | W | W | L | L | W | W | D | D | L | D | W | D | L | L | W | D | W | L | D | W | D | W | W | L | W | W | L | L | D | W | W | L | W | L | L | L | D |
| Position | 2 | 1 | 1 | 1 | 1 | 4 | 6 | 8 | 12 | 8 | 5 | 8 | 11 | 9 | 7 | 8 | 8 | 11 | 12 | 8 | 10 | 11 | 13 | 10 | 10 | 10 | 11 | 12 | 10 | 10 | 9 | 7 | 8 | 6 | 6 | 9 | 9 | 9 | 9 | 7 | 9 | 8 | 10 | 10 | 10 | 11 |
| Points | 3 | 6 | 9 | 12 | 12 | 12 | 13 | 13 | 13 | 16 | 19 | 19 | 19 | 22 | 25 | 26 | 27 | 27 | 28 | 31 | 32 | 32 | 32 | 35 | 36 | 39 | 39 | 40 | 43 | 44 | 47 | 50 | 50 | 53 | 56 | 56 | 56 | 57 | 60 | 63 | 63 | 66 | 66 | 66 | 66 | 67 |

Source: EFL
A = Away; H = Home; W = Win; D = Draw; L = Loss; P = Postponed
Notes:
- ^{1} Matchday 25 (vs. Barnet was postponed due to a frozen pitch.

==== Matches ====
On 26 June, the League Two fixtures were released.

Win Draw Loss Fixtures

| 2 August 2025 1 | Salford City | 1–3 | Crewe Alexandra | Kersal |
| 15:00 BST | Woodburn (penalty missed) 5'; Harris 16'; Edwards (yellow card) 34'; Grant (yellow card) 45+3'; Cesay (yellow card) 69'; Ayina (yellow card) 81' | Report | Harris 8' (o.g.); Connolly (yellow card) 38'; Thomas 41', 45+4'; O'Reilly (yellow card) 66' | Stadium: Moor Lane; Attendance: 3,994 (1,224 away); Referee: Neil Hair |

| 9 August 2025 2 | Crewe Alexandra | 2–0 | Accrington Stanley | Crewe |
| 15:00 BST | Hutchinson 18'; Agius 30'; Sanders (yellow card) 38' | Report | | Stadium: Gresty Road; Attendance: 5,093 (169 away); Referee: Richard Eley |

| 16 August 2025 3 | Crewe Alexandra | 1–0 | Crawley Town | Crewe |
| 15:00 BST | O'Reilly 23', (yellow card) 85'; Connolly (yellow card) 45+2'; Hutchinson (yellow card) 71'; Lunt (yellow card) 88' | Report | Williams (yellow card) 67'; Roles (yellow card) 85' | Stadium: Gresty Road; Attendance: 5,062; Referee: Seb Stockbridge |

| 19 August 2025 4 | Fleetwood Town | 1–4 | Crewe Alexandra | Fleetwood |
| 19:45 BST | Davies (yellow card) 56'; Rooney (yellow card) 57'; Lynch (yellow card) 67'; Evans (yellow card) 76'; Norwood 77' (pen.), (yellow card) 83'; Morrison (yellow card) 90+4' | Report | Mullarkey 1' (o.g.); March 22'; Agius 50'; Hutchinson 55'; Lunt (yellow card) 67'; Demetriou (yellow card) 76'; Booth (yellow card) 81' | Stadium: Highbury Stadium; Attendance: 2,529; Referee: Thomas Kirk |

| 23 August 2025 5 | Gillingham | 1–0 | Crewe Alexandra | Gillingham |
| 15:00 BST | Gale (yellow card) 4', (goal) 89'; Cirino (yellow card) 66' | Report | Hutchinson (yellow card) 23'; Demetriou (yellow card) 50' | Stadium: Priestfield Stadium; Attendance: 6,089 (234 away); Referee: Abigail Byrne |

| 30 August 2025 6 | Crewe Alexandra | 0–3 | Swindon Town | Crewe |
| 12:30 BST | Hutchinson (yellow card) 82' | Report | Kilkenny 8'; Glatzel 35'; Drinan 41'; Nichols (yellow card) 56' | Stadium: Gresty Road; Attendance: 5,431; Referee: Matthew Russell |
Note: Fixture was originally scheduled for a 15:00 kick-off, but was moved for live Sky Sports broadcasting.

| 6 September 2025 7 | Colchester United | 1–1 | Crewe Alexandra | Colchester |
| 15:00 BST | Hunt (yellow card) 59'; Lisbie 66'; Tucker (yellow card) 90+6' | Report | Golding (yellow card) 18'; O'Reilly (yellow card) 19'; March 39'; Hutchinson (yellow card) 65'; Connolly (yellow card) 90+2' | Stadium: Colchester Community Stadium; Attendance: 4,572 (211 away); Referee: Greg Rollason |

| 13 September 2025 8 | Crewe Alexandra | 1–2 | Barnet | Crewe |
| 15:00 BST | O'Reilly 54'; March (penalty missed) 61'; Sanders (penalty missed) 71' | Report | Hartigan (yellow card) 38'; Ndlovu 57'; Collinge (yellow card) 70'; Glover 80'; Senior (yellow card) 86'; Shelton (yellow card) 87' | Stadium: Gresty Road; Attendance: 4,762; Referee: Declan Bourne |

| 20 September 2025 9 | Barrow | 1–0 | Crewe Alexandra | Barrow-in-Furness |
| 15:00 BST | Gordon (yellow card) 56'; Fletcher 58'; Stanway (yellow card) 90' | Report | Hutchinson (yellow card) 28'; Thomas (yellow card) 82' | Stadium: Holker Street; Attendance: 3,177 (389 away); Referee: Scott Oldham |

| 27 September 2025 10 | Crewe Alexandra | 2–1 | Notts County | Crewe |
| 12:30 BST | Billington (yellow card) 1'; Demetriou 8'; Sanders (yellow card) 54'; Holíček (yellow card) 57'; March 90+5' (pen.) | Report | Hall (yellow card) 3'; Bedeau (yellow card) 36'; Tsaroulla 45+1'; Cotter (yellow card) 90+1'; Roos (yellow card) 90+4' | Stadium: Gresty Road; Attendance: 5,285; Referee: Paul Tierney |
Note: Fixture was originally scheduled for a 15:00 kick-off, but was moved for live Sky Sports broadcasting.

| 6 October 2025 11 | Harrogate Town | 1–2 | Crewe Alexandra | Harrogate |
| 20:00 BST | Muldoon 5'; Morris (yellow card) 73'; Burrell (yellow card) 90' | | Hutchinson 29'; Sanders 87' | Stadium: Wetherby Road; Attendance: 2,503; Referee: Simon Mather |
Note: Fixture was originally scheduled for 4 October, but was rescheduled for live Sky Sports broadcasting.

| 11 October 2025 12 | Crewe Alexandra | 0–1 | Bromley | Crewe |
| 15:00 BST | Lunt (yellow card) 90+5' | Report | Krauhaus (yellow card) 16'; Thompson (yellow card) 38'; Cheek 52' | Stadium: Gresty Road; Attendance: 5,091; Referee: Aaron Bannister |

| 18 October 2025 13 | Milton Keynes Dons | 3–1 | Crewe Alexandra | Denbigh |
| 15:00 BST | Collar 23', (yellow card) 52'; Nemane (yellow card) 26'; Offord (yellow card) 36'; Gilbey 41', 57'; Paterson (yellow card) 50' | Report | Moult 90+10' | Stadium: Stadium MK; Attendance: 6,011 (483 away); Referee: Craig Hicks |

| 25 October 2025 14 | Crewe Alexandra | 3–2 | Grimsby Town | Crewe |
| 15:00 BST | Tezgel 27', 37', 87', (yellow card) 87' | Report | Walker 6', 45+1'; Sweeney (yellow card) 89' | Stadium: Gresty Road; Attendance: 5,736 (1,102 away); Referee: Martin Coy |

| 8 November 2025 15 | Crewe Alexandra | 3–1 | Shrewsbury Town | Crewe |
| 12:30 GMT | Lunt 21'; O'Reilly 56'; Sanders (yellow card) 90+1'; Bogle 90+3', (yellow card) 90+4' | Report | Ruffels 29'; Stubbs (yellow card) 36'; Boyle (yellow card) 43'; Hoole (yellow card) 50'; Sang (yellow card) 90+1' | Stadium: Gresty Road; Attendance: 6,614 (1,674 away); Referee: Tom Reeves |
Note: Fixture was originally scheduled for a 15:00 kick-off, but was rescheduled for live Sky Sports broadcasting.

| 15 November 2025 16 | Oldham Athletic | 0–0 | Crewe Alexandra | Oldham |
| 15:00 GMT | Caprice (yellow card) 45+1'; Payne (yellow card) 81' | Report | Hutchinson (yellow card) 90+5' | Stadium: Boundary Park; Attendance: 8,937; Referee: Aaron Farmer |

| 22 November 2025 17 | Crewe Alexandra | 3–3 | Chesterfield | Crewe |
| 15:00 GMT | Tezgel 35' (pen.); Golding (yellow card) 40'; Sanders (yellow card) 45+2'; Connolly (yellow card) 45+4', (goal) 69'; Agius 47' | Report | Berry 9'; Bonis 24'; Dunkley (yellow card) 34'; McFadzean (yellow card) 35'; Markanday 65'; Tanton (yellow card) 68'; Fleck (yellow card) 79'; Hemming (yellow card) 80' | Stadium: Gresty Road; Attendance: 5,770 (1,188 away); Referee: David Rock |

| 29 November 2025 18 | Cambridge United | 2–1 | Crewe Alexandra | Cambridge |
| 15:00 GMT | Smith (yellow card) 37'; Jobe 82'; Knight 90+7' (pen.) | Report | Tezgel 54'; Lunt (yellow card) 90+5'; March (yellow card) 90+6' | Stadium: Abbey Stadium; Attendance: 5,947; Referee: Martin Woods |

| 10 December 2025 19 | Crewe Alexandra | 2–2 | Newport County | Crewe |
| 19:45 GMT | Tezgel 11'; March 78'; Finney (yellow card) 81' | Report | Baker-Richardson (yellow card) 45+1' (yellow-red card) 64'; Connolly 48' (o.g.); Wright (yellow card) 56'; Driscoll-Glennon (yellow card) 61'; Antwi 90+3' | Stadium: Gresty Road; Attendance: 3,895; Referee: Edward Duckworth |
Note: Fixture was originally scheduled for 9 December, but was rescheduled due to Newport's FA Cup involvements on the preceding Sunday.

| 13 December 2025 20 | Tranmere Rovers | 1–4 | Crewe Alexandra | Birkenhead |
| 15:00 GMT | Norman (yellow card) 45+1'; Smith (yellow card) 45+9'; Joseph (yellow card) 56'; Connolly 82' (o.g.); McGowan (yellow card) 90+5' | Report | Sanders 17', 45+2'; Thibaut (yellow card) 45+9'; Tezgel 59'; Billington (yellow card) 63'; O'Reilly 71' | Stadium: Prenton Park; Referee: Ross Joyce |

| 19 December 2025 21 | Crewe Alexandra | 1–1 | Bristol Rovers | Crewe |
| 19:45 GMT | Tezgel 9'; Thibaut (red card) 30'; Connolly (yellow card) 50'; Sanders (yellow card) 60' | Report | Morton 12'; Mola (yellow card) 30'; Sparkes (yellow card) 36'; Southwood (yellow card) 60' | Stadium: Gresty Road; Attendance: 9,125; Referee: Michael Barlow |
Note: Fixture was originally scheduled for 20 December, but was brought forward to help with the busy Christmas schedule.

| 26 December 2025 22 | Walsall | 1–0 | Crewe Alexandra | Bescot |
| 15:00 GMT | Matt 45+2'; Harper (yellow card) 90+3' | Report | Billington (yellow card) 63'; Holíček (yellow card) 79' | Stadium: Bescot Stadium; Attendance: 7,609; Referee: Simon Mather |

| 29 December 2025 23 | Newport County | 2–0 | Crewe Alexandra | Newport |
| 19:45 GMT | Baker-Richardson 28'; Glennon (yellow card) 40'; Braybrooke 76' | Report | Mingi (yellow card) 49'; Moult (yellow card) 73'; Connolly (yellow card) 90+1' | Stadium: Rodney Parade; Attendance: 3,925; Referee: Abigail Byrne |

| 1 January 2026 24 | Crewe Alexandra | 4–1 | Cheltenham Town | Crewe |
| 15:00 GMT | Holíček 1'; March 22', 77'; Connolly 34' | Report | Adelakun (yellow card) 20'; Miller 43' | Stadium: Gresty Road; Attendance: 4,982; Referee: Dale Baines |

| 10 January 2026 26 | Crewe Alexandra | 1–1 | Harrogate Town | Crewe |
| 15:00 GMT | Agius 61'; Lawlor (yellow card) 90+1'; Thibaut (yellow card) 90+3' | Report | Jameson (yellow card) 22'; Cursons 90+3' | Stadium: Gresty Road; Attendance: 4,622; Referee: Charles Breakspear |

| 17 January 2026 27 | Crewe Alexandra | 3–1 | Barrow | Crewe |
| 15:00 GMT | Sanders (yellow card) 10'; O'Reilly 13'; Agius 17', (yellow card) 90+6'; March 38'; Demetriou (yellow card) 40'; Hutchinson (yellow card) 48' | Report | Jackson (yellow card) 18'; Fletcher 31'; Anderson (yellow card) 65'; Smith (yellow card) 65' | Stadium: Gresty Road; Attendance: 4,770 (338 away); Referee: Seb Stockbrige |

| 24 January 2026 28 | Notts County | 1–0 | Crewe Alexandra | Nottingham |
| 12:30 GMT | Jatta 8'; Norburn (yellow card) 30'; Bedeau (yellow card) 82' | Report | Holíček (yellow card) 52'; O'Reilly (yellow card) 62' | Stadium: Meadow Lane; Attendance: 9,720 (846 away); Referee: Isaac Searle |
Note: Fixture was initially scheduled for a 15:00 kick-off, but was rescheduled for live Sky Sports broadcasting.

| 27 January 2026 29 | Bromley | 2–2 | Crewe Alexandra | Bromley |
| 19:45 GMT | Whitely 31'; Charles (yellow card) 58'; Thompson 70'; Sowunmi (yellow card) 76' | Report | Pond (yellow card) 21', (goal) 54'; March (yellow card) 76'; Demetriou 90+4'; Sanders (yellow card) 90+6' | Stadium: Hayes Lane; Attendance: 3,618; Referee: Aaron Farmer |

| 31 January 2026 30 | Crewe Alexandra | 1–0 | Colchester United | Crewe |
| 15:00 GMT | Agius 68' | Report | Gape (yellow card) 49'; Back (yellow card) 74'; Payne (yellow card) 90+5' | Stadium: Gresty Road; Attendance: 4,776; Referee: Seb Stockbridge |

| 3 February 2026 25 | Barnet | 1–1 | Crewe Alexandra | Edgware |
| 19:45 GMT | Tshimanga 7' | Report | Lunt 32', (yellow card) 72'; Hutchinson (yellow card) 48'; Pond (yellow card) 82' | Stadium: The Hive Stadium; Attendance: 1,908; Referee: Peter Wright |
Note: Fixture was originally scheduled for 4 January, but it was postponed due to a frozen pitch.

| 7 February 2026 31 | Crawley Town | 0–1 | Crewe Alexandra | Crawley |
| 12:30 GMT | Gordon (yellow card) 41'; Darcy (yellow card) 75' | Report | O'Reilly 77' | Stadium: Broadfield Stadium; Referee: Benjamin Speedie |
Note: Fixture was initially scheduled for a 15:00 kick-off, but was rescheduled for live Sky Sports broadcasting.

| 14 February 2026 32 | Crewe Alexandra | 1–0 | Gillingham | Crewe |
| 15:00 GMT | Thibaut 64' | Report | McKenzie (yellow card) 90+5' | Stadium: Gresty Road; Attendance: 4,972 (399 away); Referee: Martin Coy |

| 17 February 2026 33 | Crewe Alexandra | 0–1 | Fleetwood Town | Crewe |
| 19:45 GMT | | Report | Helm 21'; Powell (yellow card) 32'; Ennis (yellow card) 67'; Rooney (yellow card) 82' | Stadium: Gresty Road; Attendance: 4,341; Referee: Ross Martin |

| 21 February 2026 34 | Swindon Town | 1–2 | Crewe Alexandra | Swindon |
| 12:30 GMT | Drinan (yellow card) 45+3'; Olakigbe 64' | Report | Pond (yellow card) 27'; Holíček 45+2'; March 53' | Stadium: County Ground; Attendance: 7,485 (276 away); Referee: Kirsty Dowle |
Note: Fixture was initially scheduled for a 15:00 kick-off, but was rescheduled for live Sky Sports broadcasting.

| 28 February 2026 35 | Crewe Alexandra | 2–1 | Tranmere Rovers | Crewe |
| 15:00 GMT | Thomas 77'; March 90+1', (yellow card) 90+2' | Report | Plant 44'; Finley (yellow card) 51'; Obiero (yellow card) 90'; Warrington (yellow card) 90+5' | Stadium: Gresty Road; Attendance: 6,253 (1,205 away); Referee: Harrison Blair |

| 7 March 2026 36 | Bristol Rovers | 2–1 | Crewe Alexandra | Bristol |
| 15:00 GMT | Harrison (yellow card) 33'; Leigh 87', 90+2'; Mola (yellow card) 90+6'; Balmer (yellow card) 90+6' | Report | Pond 17'; Billington (yellow card) 30'; Sanders (yellow card) 84'; Connolly (yellow card) 90+5'; Bogle (yellow card) 90+6' | Stadium: Memorial Stadium; Attendance: 7,924; Referee: Edward Duckworth |

| 14 March 2026 37 | Crewe Alexandra | 0–3 | Walsall | Crewe |
| 15:00 GMT | Pond (yellow card) 16'; Lawlor (yellow card) 30' | Report | Adomah 4', 90+1'; Farqharson (yellow card) 12'; Kanu (penalty missed) 31'; Browne (yellow card) 55'; Pressley 83'; Comley (yellow card) 90+5' | Stadium: Gresty Road; Attendance: 5,885 (1,125 away); Referee: Stephen Parkinson |

| 17 March 2026 38 | Cheltenham Town | 1–1 | Crewe Alexandra | Cheltenham |
| 19:45 GMT | Young (yellow card) 51'; Bickerstaff 55', (yellow card) 79'; Tomkinson (yellow card) 70' | Report | Lankester (yellow card) 80'; Connolly 85' | Stadium: Whaddon Road; Attendance: 3,003; Referee: Steven Copeland |

| 21 March 2026 39 | Shrewsbury Town | 0–4 | Crewe Alexandra | Shrewsbury |
| 15:00 GMT | | Report | Cox 5' (o.g.); March 8', 63', (yellow card) 64'; Lankester (yellow card) 45+1'; Tezgel 70', (yellow card) 71' | Stadium: New Meadow; Attendance: 7,041 (1,648 away); Referee: Jamie O'Connor |

| 28 March 2026 40 | Crewe Alexandra | 2–1 | Oldham Athletic | Crewe |
| 15:00 GMT | Hutchinson 33', (yellow card) 46'; Pond (yellow card) 75'; Sanders (yellow card) 83'; Holíček 90+1', (yellow card) 90+2' | Report | Drummond 29' | Stadium: Gresty Road; Attendance: 6,587 (1,680 away); Referee: Simon Mather |

| 3 April 2026 41 | Accrington Stanley | 2–0 | Crewe Alexandra | Accrington |
| 15:00 BST | Sass (yellow card) 45+2', (goal) 51'; Conneely 56', (yellow card) 62'; Love (yellow card) 87' | Report | March (yellow card) 30' | Stadium: Crown Ground; Attendance: 2,790 (858 Crewe); Referee: Oliver Mackey |

| 6 April 2026 42 | Crewe Alexandra | 1–0 | Salford City | Crewe |
| 15:00 BST | Tezgel 14'; Pond (yellow card) 90+6' | Report | Grant (yellow card) 90+7' | Stadium: Gresty Road; Attendance: 5,703 (547 away); Referee: Paul Howard |

| 11 April 2026 43 | Grimsby Town | 3–2 | Crewe Alexandra | Cleethorpes |
| 15:00 BST | Cook 10', 58'; Green 49'; Kacurri (yellow card) 62' | Report | O'Reilly 88'; Demetriou 90+7' | Stadium: Blundell Park; Attendance: 6,931 (364 away); Referee: David Rock |

| 18 April 2026 44 | Crewe Alexandra | 1–3 | Milton Keynes Dons | Crewe |
| 15:00 BST | Sanders (yellow card) 59'; Thibaut 75' | Report | Nelson 12'; Ekpiteta 45+1'; Gilbey (yellow card) 60', (goal) 66' | Stadium: Gresty Road; Attendance: 5,858 (1,087 away); Referee: Zac Kennard-Kettle |

| 25 April 2026 45 | Chesterfield | 2–0 | Crewe Alexandra | Chesterfield |
| 15:00 BST | Bonis 36', 68'; Dobra (yellow card) 42'; Braybrooke (yellow card) 45' | Report | Pond (yellow card) 62' | Stadium: SMH Group Stadium; Attendance: 9,560 (749 away); Referee: James Bell |

| 2 May 2026 46 | Crewe Alexandra | 0–0 | Cambridge United | Crewe |
| 15:00 BST | Dancey (yellow card) 53' | Report | Knight (penalty missed) 25'; Kaikai (yellow card) 32'; Gibbons (yellow card) 53'; Ruddock Mpanzu (yellow card) 84' | Stadium: Gresty Road; Attendance: 7,335 (2,323 away); Referee: Neil Hair |

=== FA Cup ===
Crewe were drawn at home to Doncaster Rovers in the first round.

Win Draw Loss Fixtures

| 1 November 2025 First round | Crewe Alexandra | 1–2 | Doncaster Rovers | Crewe |
| 15:00 GMT | Demetriou 45' | Report | Pearson (yellow card) 40'; Sharp 54'; Olusanya (yellow card) 86'; Bailey 90+2' | Stadium: Gresty Road; Attendance: 2,996; Referee: Neil Hair |

=== EFL Cup ===
Crewe were drawn away to Stockport County in the first round.

Win Draw Loss Fixtures

| 12 August 2025 First round | Stockport County | 3–1 | Crewe Alexandra | Edgeley |
| 19:30 BST | Andrew (yellow card) 31'; Wootton 49'; Lowe 52'; Connolly (yellow card) 56'; Fiorini 77' | Report | Tezgel 86' | Stadium: Edgeley Park; Attendance: 4,945; Referee: Scott Jackson |

=== EFL Trophy ===
Crewe were drawn against Burton Albion, Chesterfield and Liverpool U21 in the group stage. After winning the group, Alex were drawn at home to Stockport County in the round of 32.

| Pos | Div | Team | Pld | W | PW | PL | L | GF | GA | GD | Pts | Qualification |
|---|---|---|---|---|---|---|---|---|---|---|---|---|
| 1 | L2 | Crewe Alexandra | 3 | 3 | 0 | 0 | 0 | 12 | 2 | +10 | 9 | Advance to Round 2 |
| 2 | L2 | Chesterfield | 3 | 1 | 0 | 1 | 1 | 4 | 9 | −5 | 4 | Advance to Round 2 |
| 3 | L1 | Burton Albion | 3 | 1 | 0 | 0 | 2 | 3 | 4 | −1 | 3 | |
| 4 | ACA | Liverpool U21 | 3 | 0 | 1 | 0 | 2 | 2 | 6 | −4 | 2 | |

Source: EFL

Win Draw Loss Fixtures

| 2 September 2025 Nor. Group H | Crewe Alexandra | 7–1 | Chesterfield | Crewe |
| 19:00 BST | Tezgel 4' 6' 51'; Agius 16'; Moult 30'; Thibaut 57' (pen.) Armstrong 67' | Report | Lewis 21'; Grimes (yellow card) 56' | Stadium: Gresty Road; Attendance: 961; Referee: Greg Rollason |

| 14 October 2025 Nor. Group H | Crewe Alexandra | 2–0 | Liverpool U21 | Crewe |
| 19:00 BST | Tezgel 11' (pen.); Rankine 30'; Moore (yellow card) 59'; Scott-Abel (yellow card) 76'; Hodkin (yellow card) 89' | Report | Laffey (yellow card) 8'; Mrozek (yellow card) 10' | Stadium: Gresty Road; Attendance: 1,248; Referee: Martin Woods |

| 11 November 2025 Nor. Group H | Burton Albion | 1–3 | Crewe Alexandra | Burton upon Trent |
| 19:00 GMT | Scutt 50'; Tavares (penalty missed) 58' | Report | Bogle 10', 19'; Holíček (yellow card) 25'; Hodkin 48'; Mingi (yellow card) 88' | Stadium: Pirelli Stadium; Attendance: 791; Referee: Peter Wright |

| 3 December 2025 Round of 32 | Crewe Alexandra | 1–1 (1–4 p) | Stockport County | Crewe |
| 19:00 GMT | Thibaut 5' | Report | Andrésson 33' | Stadium: Gresty Road; Attendance: 1,535 (636 away); Referee: Richie Watkins |
| | Penalties |
| | Tezgel (penalty missed); March (penalty missed); Agius (penalty scored) | | Dodgson (penalty scored); Moxon (penalty scored); Fevrier (penalty scored); Diamond (penalty scored) |

== Statistics ==
=== Appearances and goals ===
Players with no appearances are not included on the list; italics indicated a loaned in player

| No. | Pos | Nat | Player | Total | | League Two | | FA Cup | | EFL Cup | | EFL Trophy | |
| No. | Pos | Nat | Player | Apps | Goals | Apps | Goals | Apps | Goals | Apps | Goals | Apps | Goals |
|---|---|---|---|---|---|---|---|---|---|---|---|---|---|
| 1 | GK | (England) ENG | Tom Booth | 19 | 0 | 19+0 | 0 | 0+0 | 0 | 0+0 | 0 | 0+0 | 0 |
| 2 | DF | (England) ENG | Lewis Billington | 50 | 0 | 46+0 | 0 | 0+0 | 0 | 0+1 | 0 | 2+1 | 0 |
| 3 | DF | (England) ENG | Reece Hutchinson | 47 | 4 | 42+3 | 4 | 0+1 | 0 | 0+0 | 0 | 0+1 | 0 |
| 5 | DF | (England) ENG | Mickey Demetriou | 39 | 4 | 35+3 | 3 | 1+0 | 1 | 0+0 | 0 | 0+0 | 0 |
| 6 | MF | (England) ENG | Max Sanders | 40 | 3 | 34+3 | 3 | 1+0 | 0 | 0+0 | 0 | 1+1 | 0 |
| 7 | MF | (England) ENG | Jack Lankester | 12 | 0 | 4+8 | 0 | 0+0 | 0 | 0+0 | 0 | 0+0 | 0 |
| 8 | MF | (England) ENG | Conor Thomas | 28 | 3 | 19+8 | 3 | 1+0 | 0 | 0+0 | 0 | 0+0 | 0 |
| 9 | FW | (England) ENG | Omar Bogle | 17 | 3 | 0+16 | 1 | 0+0 | 0 | 0+0 | 0 | 1+0 | 2 |
| 10 | FW | (England) ENG | Shilow Tracey | 3 | 0 | 0+3 | 0 | 0+0 | 0 | 0+0 | 0 | 0+0 | 0 |
| 14 | DF | (England) ENG | Charlie Finney | 25 | 0 | 5+15 | 0 | 1+0 | 0 | 1+0 | 0 | 3+0 | 0 |
| 15 | FW | (England) ENG | Dion Rankine | 15 | 1 | 1+10 | 0 | 0+1 | 0 | 0+0 | 0 | 3+0 | 1 |
| 17 | MF | (Slovakia) SVK | Matúš Holíček | 37 | 3 | 24+11 | 3 | 0+1 | 0 | 0+0 | 0 | 1+0 | 0 |
| 18 | DF | (Wales) WAL | James Connolly | 45 | 3 | 34+7 | 3 | 1+0 | 0 | 1+0 | 0 | 1+1 | 0 |
| 19 | MF | (England) ENG | Owen Lunt | 35 | 2 | 26+5 | 2 | 1+0 | 0 | 1+0 | 0 | 1+1 | 0 |
| 20 | FW | (Wales) WAL | Calum Agius | 44 | 7 | 33+7 | 6 | 1+0 | 0 | 0+1 | 0 | 2+0 | 1 |
| 22 | DF | (England) ENG | Phil Croker | 6 | 0 | 0+1 | 0 | 0+0 | 0 | 1+0 | 0 | 4+0 | 0 |
| 23 | MF | (England) ENG | Jack Powell | 32 | 0 | 18+12 | 0 | 0+0 | 0 | 1+0 | 0 | 1+0 | 0 |
| 24 | FW | (England) ENG | Josh March | 41 | 11 | 36+4 | 11 | 0+0 | 0 | 0+0 | 0 | 0+1 | 0 |
| 25 | DF | (England) ENG | Alfie Pond | 19 | 2 | 16+3 | 2 | 0+0 | 0 | 0+0 | 0 | 0+0 | 0 |
| 26 | MF | (England) ENG | Tommi O'Reilly | 50 | 7 | 45+1 | 7 | 1+0 | 0 | 0+1 | 0 | 1+1 | 0 |
| 27 | FW | (England) ENG | Jordan Hodkin | 3 | 1 | 0+0 | 0 | 0+0 | 0 | 0+1 | 0 | 0+2 | 1 |
| 29 | FW | (Republic of Ireland) IRL | Adrien Thibaut | 27 | 4 | 5+19 | 2 | 0+0 | 0 | 1+0 | 0 | 1+1 | 2 |
| 30 | DF | (England) ENG | Stan Dancey | 8 | 0 | 1+2 | 0 | 0+0 | 0 | 1+0 | 0 | 4+0 | 0 |
| 31 | FW | (England) ENG | Louis Moult | 21 | 2 | 1+16 | 1 | 0+1 | 0 | 0+0 | 0 | 3+0 | 1 |
| 32 | MF | (England) ENG | Luca Moore | 9 | 0 | 0+5 | 0 | 0+0 | 0 | 1+0 | 0 | 2+1 | 0 |
| 33 | MF | (England) ENG | Iago Scott | 2 | 0 | 0+0 | 0 | 0+0 | 0 | 0+0 | 0 | 1+1 | 0 |
| 34 | MF | (England) ENG | Oliver Armstrong | 5 | 1 | 0+0 | 0 | 0+0 | 0 | 0+1 | 0 | 4+0 | 1 |
| 35 | MF | (England) ENG | Ryan Chadwick | 2 | 0 | 0+0 | 0 | 0+0 | 0 | 0+0 | 0 | 0+2 | 0 |
| 36 | FW | (England) ENG | Emre Tezgel | 36 | 15 | 18+13 | 10 | 1+0 | 0 | 1+0 | 1 | 2+1 | 4 |
| 38 | FW | (England) ENG | Lucas Swann | 2 | 0 | 0+0 | 0 | 0+0 | 0 | 0+0 | 0 | 0+2 | 0 |
| 40 | FW | (Wales) WAL | Patrick Mlynarski | 1 | 0 | 0+0 | 0 | 0+0 | 0 | 0+0 | 0 | 0+1 | 0 |
| 41 | GK | (Republic of Ireland) IRL | Ian Lawlor | 22 | 0 | 22+0 | 0 | 0+0 | 0 | 0+0 | 0 | 0+0 | 0 |
Players who featured but departed the club during the season:
| 4 | DF | (England) ENG | Jay Mingi | 9 | 0 | 2+4 | 0 | 1+0 | 0 | 0+0 | 0 | 1+1 | 0 |
| 13 | GK | (England) ENG | Sam Waller | 11 | 0 | 5+0 | 0 | 1+0 | 0 | 1+0 | 0 | 4+0 | 0 |
| 16 | DF | (Republic of Ireland) IRL | James Golding | 15 | 0 | 6+6 | 0 | 0+0 | 0 | 1+0 | 0 | 1+1 | 0 |

=== Disciplinary record ===
| Rank | No. | Pos. | Player | League Two | | | FA Cup | | | EFL Cup | | | EFL Trophy | | | Total | | |
| Rank | No. | Pos. | Player | Yellow card | (yellow card) (yellow-red card) | Red card | Yellow card | (yellow card) (yellow-red card) | Red card | Yellow card | (yellow card) (yellow-red card) | Red card | Yellow card | (yellow card) (yellow-red card) | Red card | Yellow card | (yellow card) (yellow-red card) | Red card |
|---|---|---|---|---|---|---|---|---|---|---|---|---|---|---|---|---|---|---|
| 1 | 6 | MF | (England) Max Sanders | 11 | 0 | 0 | 0 | 0 | 0 | 0 | 0 | 0 | 0 | 0 | 0 | 11 | 0 | 0 |
| 2 | 3 | DF | (England) Reece Hutchinson | 9 | 0 | 0 | 0 | 0 | 0 | 0 | 0 | 0 | 0 | 0 | 0 | 9 | 0 | 0 |
| 3 | 18 | DF | (Wales) James Connolly | 7 | 0 | 0 | 0 | 0 | 0 | 0 | 0 | 0 | 0 | 0 | 0 | 7 | 0 | 0 |
| 3 | 25 | DF | (England) Alfie Pond | 7 | 0 | 0 | 0 | 0 | 0 | 0 | 0 | 0 | 0 | 0 | 0 | 7 | 0 | 0 |
| 5 | 17 | MF | (Slovakia) Matúš Holíček | 4 | 0 | 0 | 0 | 0 | 0 | 0 | 0 | 0 | 1 | 0 | 0 | 5 | 0 | 0 |
| 5 | 19 | MF | (England) Owen Lunt | 5 | 0 | 0 | 0 | 0 | 0 | 0 | 0 | 0 | 0 | 0 | 0 | 5 | 0 | 0 |
| 5 | 24 | FW | (England) Josh March | 5 | 0 | 0 | 0 | 0 | 0 | 0 | 0 | 0 | 0 | 0 | 0 | 5 | 0 | 0 |
| 5 | 29 | FW | (Republic of Ireland) Adrien Thibaut | 2 | 0 | 1 | 0 | 0 | 0 | 0 | 0 | 0 | 0 | 0 | 0 | 2 | 0 | 1 |
| 9 | 2 | DF | (England) Lewis Billington | 4 | 0 | 0 | 0 | 0 | 0 | 0 | 0 | 0 | 0 | 0 | 0 | 4 | 0 | 0 |
| 9 | 26 | MF | (England) Tommi O'Reilly | 4 | 0 | 0 | 0 | 0 | 0 | 0 | 0 | 0 | 0 | 0 | 0 | 4 | 0 | 0 |
| 11 | 5 | DF | (England) Mickey Demetriou | 3 | 0 | 0 | 0 | 0 | 0 | 0 | 0 | 0 | 0 | 0 | 0 | 3 | 0 | 0 |
| 12 | 4 | DF | (England) Jay Mingi | 2 | 0 | 0 | 0 | 0 | 0 | 0 | 0 | 0 | 0 | 0 | 0 | 2 | 0 | 0 |
| 12 | 7 | MF | (England) Jack Lankester | 2 | 0 | 0 | 0 | 0 | 0 | 0 | 0 | 0 | 0 | 0 | 0 | 2 | 0 | 0 |
| 12 | 9 | FW | (England) Omar Bogle | 2 | 0 | 0 | 0 | 0 | 0 | 0 | 0 | 0 | 0 | 0 | 0 | 2 | 0 | 0 |
| 12 | 16 | DF | (Republic of Ireland) James Golding | 2 | 0 | 0 | 0 | 0 | 0 | 0 | 0 | 0 | 0 | 0 | 0 | 2 | 0 | 0 |
| 12 | 36 | FW | (England) Emre Tezgel | 2 | 0 | 0 | 0 | 0 | 0 | 0 | 0 | 0 | 0 | 0 | 0 | 2 | 0 | 0 |
| 12 | 41 | GK | (Republic of Ireland) Ian Lawlor | 2 | 0 | 0 | 0 | 0 | 0 | 0 | 0 | 0 | 0 | 0 | 0 | 2 | 0 | 0 |
| 18 | 1 | GK | (England) Tom Booth | 1 | 0 | 0 | 0 | 0 | 0 | 0 | 0 | 0 | 0 | 0 | 0 | 1 | 0 | 0 |
| 18 | 8 | MF | (England) Conor Thomas | 1 | 0 | 0 | 0 | 0 | 0 | 0 | 0 | 0 | 0 | 0 | 0 | 1 | 0 | 0 |
| 18 | 14 | DF | (England) Charlie Finney | 1 | 0 | 0 | 0 | 0 | 0 | 0 | 0 | 0 | 0 | 0 | 0 | 1 | 0 | 0 |
| 18 | 20 | FW | (Wales) Calum Agius | 1 | 0 | 0 | 0 | 0 | 0 | 0 | 0 | 0 | 0 | 0 | 0 | 1 | 0 | 0 |
| 18 | 23 | MF | (England) Jack Powell | 1 | 0 | 0 | 0 | 0 | 0 | 0 | 0 | 0 | 0 | 0 | 0 | 1 | 0 | 0 |
| 18 | 27 | FW | (England) Jordan Hodkin | 0 | 0 | 0 | 0 | 0 | 0 | 0 | 0 | 0 | 1 | 0 | 0 | 1 | 0 | 0 |
| 18 | 30 | DF | (Wales) Stan Dancey | 1 | 0 | 0 | 0 | 0 | 0 | 0 | 0 | 0 | 0 | 0 | 0 | 1 | 0 | 0 |
| 18 | 31 | FW | (England) Louis Moult | 1 | 0 | 0 | 0 | 0 | 0 | 0 | 0 | 0 | 0 | 0 | 0 | 1 | 0 | 0 |
| 18 | 32 | MF | (England) Luca Moore | 0 | 0 | 0 | 0 | 0 | 0 | 0 | 0 | 0 | 1 | 0 | 0 | 1 | 0 | 0 |
| 18 | 33 | MF | (England) Iago Scott | 0 | 0 | 0 | 0 | 0 | 0 | 0 | 0 | 0 | 1 | 0 | 0 | 1 | 0 | 0 |
| Totals | | | | 79 | 0 | 1 | 0 | 0 | 0 | 0 | 0 | 0 | 5 | 0 | 0 | 84 | 0 | 1 |
