= Emre Tezgel =

English footballer (born 2005)

- Tezgel with Wycombe Wanderers in 2026

Personal information
- Full name: Emre James Vann Tezgel
- Date of birth: 19 September 2005 (age 21)
- Place of birth: Burton upon Trent, England
- Height: 1.82 m (6 ft 0 in)
- Position: Forward

Team information
- Current team: Wycombe Wanderers (on loan from Stoke City)
- Number: 19

Youth career
- 2021–2022: Stoke City

Senior career*
Years	Team	Apps	(Gls)
2022–	Stoke City	15	(0)
2024	→ Milton Keynes Dons (loan)	15	(3)
2025–2026	→ Crewe Alexandra (loan)	31	(10)
2026–	→ Wycombe Wanderers (loan)	6	(0)

International career^{‡}
2021	England U16	2	(3)
2021–2022	England U17	10	(7)
2024–	England U20	2	(0)
- * Club domestic league appearances and goals as of 11 October 2026 (UTC) ‡ National team caps and goals as of 10:34, 27 September 2024 (UTC)

Emre James Vann Tezgel (born 19 September 2005) is an English professional footballer who plays as a forward for League One club Wycombe Wanderers on loan from EFL Championship club Stoke City.

Tezgel is Stoke City's youngest ever senior player, having debuted at 16 in January 2022. He is a youth international for England having represented them at U16, U17 and U20 levels.

== Club career ==
=== Stoke City ===
Tezgel made his professional debut for Stoke City on 9 January 2022 in a 2–0 FA Cup victory over Leyton Orient becoming Stoke's youngest player, aged 16 and 112 days. On 29 June 2022, Tezgel signed as a scholar and also agreed to a three-year professional contract which took effect on his 17th birthday.

==== Milton Keynes Dons (loan) ====
On 1 February 2024, Tezgel joined League Two side Milton Keynes Dons on loan for the remainder of the 2023–24 season. Tezgel scored his first senior goal on 29 March 2024, in a 5–0 victory against Walsall. He scored a further two goals as MK Dons missed out on automatic promotion finishing fourth and were well beaten by Crawley Town in the EFL League Two play-offs.

Tezgel scored his first goal for Stoke on 13 August 2024 in a 2–0 EFL Cup victory against Carlisle United. He then scored in the next round against Middlesbrough. Tezgel was prolific for the under-21s, scoring 22 goals in nine matches, and was awarded the Premier League 2 player of the month for March 2025. He signed a new two-year contract at the end of the 2024–25 season.

==== Crewe Alexandra (loan) ====
In July 2025, Tezgel joined League Two side Crewe Alexandra on loan for the 2025–26 season. He scored his first Crewe goal in their 3–1 first round EFL Cup defeat at Stockport County on 12 August 2025. On 2 September 2025, Tezgel scored Crewe's first hat-trick in eight years as the side beat Chesterfield 7–1 in their opening tie in the EFL Trophy group stage. On 25 October 2025, Tezgel scored a further hat-trick in Crewe's 3–2 League win over Grimsby Town. A month later, after five goals in his last seven games, Tezgel was praised by Crewe's player development manager Kenny Lunt for "his all-round game, what he does for the team, his work-rate, his assists, he's more than just a goalscorer, he's a top player." With a further EFL Trophy goal and two assists helping Crewe top Northern Group H, Tezgel was awarded the Vertu Trophy Player of the Round for the Group Stages on 2 December 2025. After sustaining an ankle injury against Bristol Rovers on 19 December 2025, he was sidelined until mid-March, scoring his 14th goal of the season in Crewe's 4–0 win at Shrewsbury Town on 21 March 2026. He was named as the club's Young Player of the Year at the end of season awards. Tezgel ended the 2025–26 season with 15 goals from 36 appearances as Crewe finished in 11th position.

==== Wycombe Wanderers (loan) ====
On 23 July 2026, Tezgel joined League One side Wycombe Wanderers on loan for the 2026–27 season.

== International career ==
In June 2021 Tezgel scored a hat-trick for England under-16 against Northern Ireland. Later that year he scored two goals for England under-17 against Netherlands in the final of the 2021 Syrenka Cup. In February 2024 Tezgel was called up to the Turkey U19 squad qualifying to represent that nation through his father. However he did not make an appearance and on 6 September 2024 Tezgel made his debut for the England U20 side coming off the bench as a substitute in their draw against Turkey U20.

== Personal life ==
Tezgel is of Turkish descent through his father with roots in Aksaray. He attended Painsley Catholic College. His cousin Tash played for Stoke City Women.

== Career statistics ==
As of match played 2 May 2026

Appearances and goals by club, season and competition
Club	Season	League			FA Cup		League Cup		Other		Total	
Club	Season	Division	Apps	Goals	Apps	Goals	Apps	Goals	Apps	Goals	Apps	Goals
Stoke City	2021–22	Championship	0	0	2	0	0	0	—		2	0
Stoke City	2022–23	Championship	3	0	1	0	0	0	—		4	0
Stoke City	2023–24	Championship	0	0	0	0	0	0	—		0	0
Stoke City	2024–25	Championship	12	0	2	0	3	2	—		17	2
Stoke City	2025–26	Championship	0	0	0	0	0	0	—		0	0
Stoke City	2026–27	Championship	0	0	0	0	0	0	—		0	0
Stoke City	Total		15	0	5	0	3	2	—		23	2
Milton Keynes Dons (loan)	2023–24	League Two	15	3	0	0	0	0	2 (Note: Appearances in EFL League Two play-offs)	0	17	3
Crewe Alexandra (loan)	2025–26	League Two	31	10	1	0	1	1	3 (Note: Appearances in EFL Trophy)	4	36	15
Wycombe Wanderers (loan)	2026–27	League One	0	0	0	0	0	0	0	0	0	0
Career total			62	13	6	0	4	3	4	4	76	20

== Honours ==
England U17

- Finalist of Syrenka Cup: 2021

Individual

- Syrenka Cup Player of the Tournament: 2021
- Crewe Alexandra Young Player of the Year: 2025–26
