= Joel Tabiner =

English footballer (born 2003)

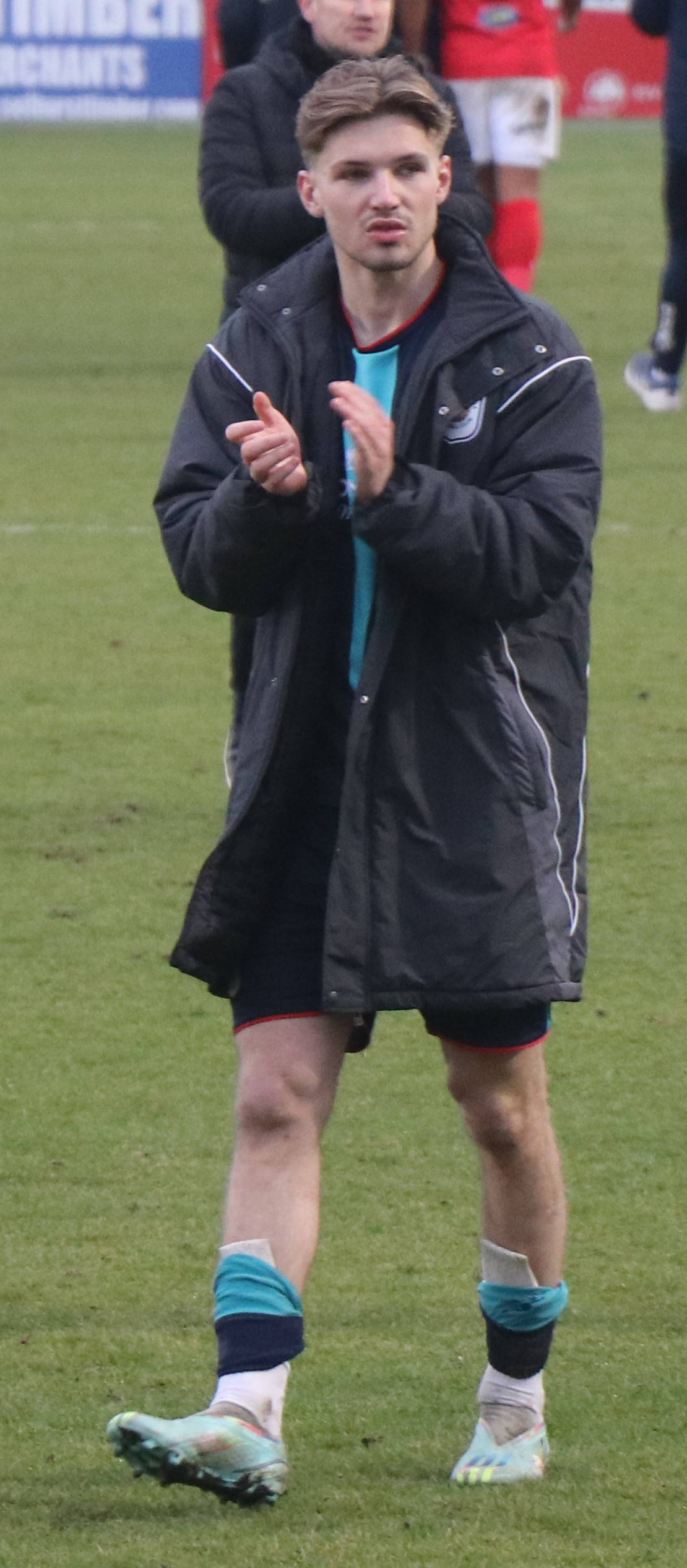
- Tabiner with Crewe Alexandra in 2023

Personal information
- Full name: Joel William Tabiner
- Date of birth: 30 November 2003 (age 22)
- Place of birth: Birkenhead, England
- Height: 6 ft 0 in (1.82 m)
- Position: Midfielder

Team information
- Current team: Crewe Alexandra
- Number: 11

Youth career
- –2020: Crewe Alexandra

Senior career*
Years	Team	Apps	(Gls)
2020–	Crewe Alexandra	110	(5)
2022	→ Leek Town (loan)	2	(0)
- * Club domestic league appearances and goals as of 16:30, 21 November 2026 (UTC)

Joel William Tabiner (born 30 November 2003) is an English professional footballer who plays as a midfielder for EFL League Two club Crewe Alexandra.

== Career ==
Tabiner signed a scholarship deal with Crewe Alexandra's Academy in 2020.

He made his Crewe debut on 9 November 2021 in an EFL Trophy group game against Wolves Under-21s at Gresty Road.

On 4 February 2022, Tabiner joined Leek Town on a one-month youth loan deal, making his debut the following day in their 2–0 home win against City of Liverpool F.C. He signed his first professional deal with Crewe at the end of the 2021–22 season, and early the following season made his first Crewe start on 9 August 2022, playing in an EFL League Cup first round defeat at Grimsby Town. Tabiner started three consecutive league games in October 2022, but Crewe manager Alex Morris was being careful not to over-burden him: "He's not going to last games yet. He's an 18-year-old boy..., and we've got to make sure that we do not break him along the way."

Tabiner scored his first Crewe goal in a 4–3 win over Salford City at Gresty Road on 10 March 2023. On 15 September 2023, he signed a new contract keeping him at Crewe until 2026, with the option of a further year. In October 2023, he incurred an ankle injury which required prolonged treatment; he eventually returned to full training in mid-February 2024, helping Crewe to a play-off final appearance at the end of the season. Tabiner played 46 games, scoring twice, during the following season, but missed all of Crewe's 2025–26 season due to a knee ligament injury incurred in April 2025.

Ahead of the 2026–27 season, Crewe manager Lee Bell said Tabiner would be a "big player" for his side; "The boy oozes quality, ... He's played in multiple positions which a lot of the players are going to have to do. ... He can play 10, he can play six, he can play off the sides. ... It's really pleasing to have him back, he's a top young man."

== Career statistics ==
As of 21 November 2026

Appearances and goals by club, season and competition
Club	Season	League			FA Cup		League Cup		Other		Total	
Club	Season	Division	Apps	Goals	Apps	Goals	Apps	Goals	Apps	Goals	Apps	Goals
Crewe Alexandra	2021–22	League One	1	0	0	0	0	0	3 (Note: Appearances in EFL Trophy)	0	4	0
Crewe Alexandra	2022–23	League Two	30	2	2	0	1	0	2	0	35	2
Crewe Alexandra	2023–24	League Two	22	1	0	0	2	0	3 (Note: Appearances in EFL League Two play-offs)	0	27	1
Crewe Alexandra	2024–25	League Two	41	2	1	0	1	0	3	0	46	2
Crewe Alexandra	2025–26	League Two	0	0	0	0	0	0	0	0	0	0
Crewe Alexandra	2026–27	League Two	16	0	1	0	1	0	1	0	19	0
Crewe Alexandra	Total		110	5	4	0	5	0	12	0	131	5
