= Chris Flynn =

Chris Flynn may refer to:

- Chris Flynn (author) (born 1972), Australian author, editor and critic
- Chris Flynn (Canadian football) (born 1966), former Canadian football quarterback
- Christopher Flynn (born 1987), Welsh footballer
