= Calum Agius =

Welsh footballer

Personal information
- Full name: Calum Stewart Agius
- Date of birth: 5 September 2005 (age 21)
- Place of birth: Chester, England
- Height: 1.78 m (5 ft 10 in)
- Position: Midfielder

Team information
- Current team: Crewe Alexandra
- Number: 20

Youth career
- 201?–2023: Crewe Alexandra

Senior career*
| Years | Team | Apps | (Gls) |
| 2023– | Crewe Alexandra | 71 | (8) |
| 2024–2025 | → Marine (loan) | 8 | (1) |

International career^{‡}
| 2021 | Wales U16 | 1 | (1) |
| 2021 | Wales U17 | 1 | (0) |
| 2023 | Wales U18 | 1 | (0) |
| 2023 | Wales U19 | 2 | (0) |
| 2025– | Wales U21 | 8 | (1) |
- * Club domestic league appearances and goals as of 16:13, 21 November 2026 (UTC) ‡ National team caps and goals as of 07:36, 8 October 2026 (UTC)

Calum Stewart Agius (born 5 September 2005) is a Welsh professional footballer who plays as a midfielder for EFL League Two club Crewe Alexandra. He is a Wales under-21 international.

== Club career ==
Having joined the club aged seven, Agius come through the Crewe Alexandra academy system, and made his debut for the club on his 18th birthday as a scholar in their EFL Trophy game against Port Vale at Vale Park on 5 September 2023, coming on as a 61st minute substitute for Joe White, and being praised for his performance by Crewe manager Lee Bell. On 14 September 2023, he signed his first professional contract with the club, agreeing a three-year deal with the option of two additional years. Agius scored his first Crewe goal in a 1–0 defeat of Harrogate Town in an EFL Trophy group stage game on 8 October 2024.

On 22 November 2024, Agius joined National League North side Marine on loan until 2 January 2025. He made eight appearances, scoring once. Returning to Crewe, he scored his first league goal in the side's 3–2 defeat by Cheltenham Town on 10 April 2025.

== International career ==
Agius was called up to the Wales under-19s squad for June 2023 friendlies against Sweden and played in both games, a 1–0 defeat on 15 June and a 2–2 draw on 18 June 2023.

On 20 March 2025, Agius played in Wales under-21s' 1–0 victory over Andorra. In October 2025 and again a year later, Agius was called up to the Under-21 squad, for European qualifiers against Belgium and Austria, playing in Wales' 2–0 victory over Austria on 14 October 2025 and the side's 1–0 defeat by Belgium on 29 September 2026. On 6 October 2026, Agius scored Wales's only goal in a 7–1 loss to Austria.

== Career statistics ==
As of 21 November 2026

Appearances and goals by club, season and competition
| Club | Season | Division | League | | FA Cup | | League Cup | | Other | | Total | |
| Club | Season | Division | Apps | Goals | Apps | Goals | Apps | Goals | Apps | Goals | Apps | Goals |
|---|---|---|---|---|---|---|---|---|---|---|---|---|
| Crewe Alexandra | 2023–24 | League Two | 3 | 0 | 1 | 0 | 0 | 0 | 3 (Note: Appearances in EFL Trophy) | 0 | 7 | 0 |
| Crewe Alexandra | 2024–25 | League Two | 14 | 1 | 0 | 0 | 0 | 0 | 3 | 1 | 17 | 2 |
| Crewe Alexandra | 2025–26 | League Two | 40 | 6 | 1 | 0 | 1 | 0 | 2 | 1 | 44 | 7 |
| Crewe Alexandra | 2026–27 | League Two | 14 | 1 | 1 | 0 | 2 | 0 | 2 | 0 | 19 | 1 |
| Crewe Alexandra | Total | | 71 | 8 | 3 | 0 | 3 | 0 | 10 | 2 | 87 | 10 |
| Marine (loan) | 2024–25 | National League North | 8 | 1 | 0 | 0 | 0 | 0 | 0 | 0 | 8 | 1 |
| Career total | | | 79 | 9 | 3 | 0 | 3 | 0 | 10 | 2 | 95 | 11 |
