= Alfie Pond =

English footballer

Personal information
- Full name: Alfie James Pond
- Date of birth: 17 February 2004 (age 22)
- Place of birth: Exeter, England
- Height: 1.91 m (6 ft 3 in)
- Position: Centre-back

Team information
- Current team: Chesterfield
- Number: 15

Youth career
- 2010–2021: Exeter City

Senior career*
Years	Team	Apps	(Gls)
2021–2022	Exeter City	0	(0)
2021–2022	→ Tiverton Town (loan)	25	(1)
2022	→ Yeovil Town (loan)	2	(0)
2022–2026	Wolverhampton Wanderers	1	(0)
2023	→ Stockport County (loan)	6	(0)
2026	→ Crewe Alexandra (loan)	19	(2)
2026–	Chesterfield	5	(0)
- * Club domestic league appearances and goals as of 17:42, 8 March 2026 (UTC)

Alfie James Pond (born 17 February 2004) is an English professional footballer who plays as a centre-back for EFL League Two club Chesterfield.

== Playing career ==
Pond made his first-team debut for Exeter City in the EFL Trophy, in a 1–1 draw with Chelsea U21 at St James Park. Speaking after the match, manager Matt Taylor described him as someone who would become "a serious player".

On 12 August 2022, Pond joined National League side Yeovil Town on loan until January 2023.

On 2 September 2022, Pond signed for Premier League side Wolverhampton Wanderers for an undisclosed fee.

Pond made his debut appearance for Wolves as a late substitute in a home EFL Cup game against Blackpool on 29 August 2023, which Wolves won 5–0.

On 31 August 2023, Pond joined EFL League Two side Stockport County on loan until the end of the 2023–24 season. On 2 January 2024, he returned to his parent club.

On 3 January 2026, Pond joined Crewe Alexandra on loan until the end of the season, making his Crewe debut in a 3–1 win against Barrow at Gresty Road on 17 January 2026, and scoring his first league goal in a 2–2 draw at Bromley ten days later.

On 6 July 2026, Pond joined EFL League Two club Chesterfield on a two-year deal.

== Career statistics ==
As of end of 2025–26 season

Appearances and goals by club, season and competition
Club	Season	League			FA Cup		EFL Cup		Other		Total	
Club	Season	Division	Apps	Goals	Apps	Goals	Apps	Goals	Apps	Goals	Apps	Goals
Exeter City	2021–22	League Two	0	0	0	0	0	0	2 (Note: Appearance(s) in EFL Trophy)	0	2	0
Exeter City	2022–23	League One	0	0	0	0	1	0	0	0	1	0
Exeter City	Total		0	0	0	0	1	0	2	0	3	0
Tiverton Town (loan)	2021–22	Southern League; Premier Division South	24	1	1	0	—		1 (Note: Appearance(s) in FA Trophy)	0	26	1
Yeovil Town (loan)	2022–23	National League	2	0	0	0	—		0	0	2	0
Wolverhampton Wanderers	2022–23	Premier League	0	0	0	0	—		—		0	0
Wolverhampton Wanderers	2023–24	Premier League	0	0	0	0	1	0	—		1	0
Wolverhampton Wanderers	2024–25	Premier League	1	0	2	0	1	0	—		4	0
Wolverhampton Wanderers	2025–26	Premier League	0	0	0	0	0	0	—		0	0
Wolverhampton Wanderers	Total		1	0	2	0	2	0	—		5	0
Wolverhampton Wanderers U23	2022–23	—			—		—		1	0	1	0
Wolverhampton Wanderers U23	2024–25	—			—		—		2	0	2	0
Wolverhampton Wanderers U23	2025–26	—			—		—		3	0	3	0
Stockport County (loan)	2023–24	League Two	6	0	1	0	—		2	0	9	0
Crewe Alexandra (loan)	2025–26	League Two	19	2	—		—		—		19	2
Chesterfield	2026–27	League Two	1	0	0	0	0	0	0	0	0	0
Career total			53	3	4	0	3	0	11	0	70	3
