= Matúš Holíček =

English footballer (born 2005)

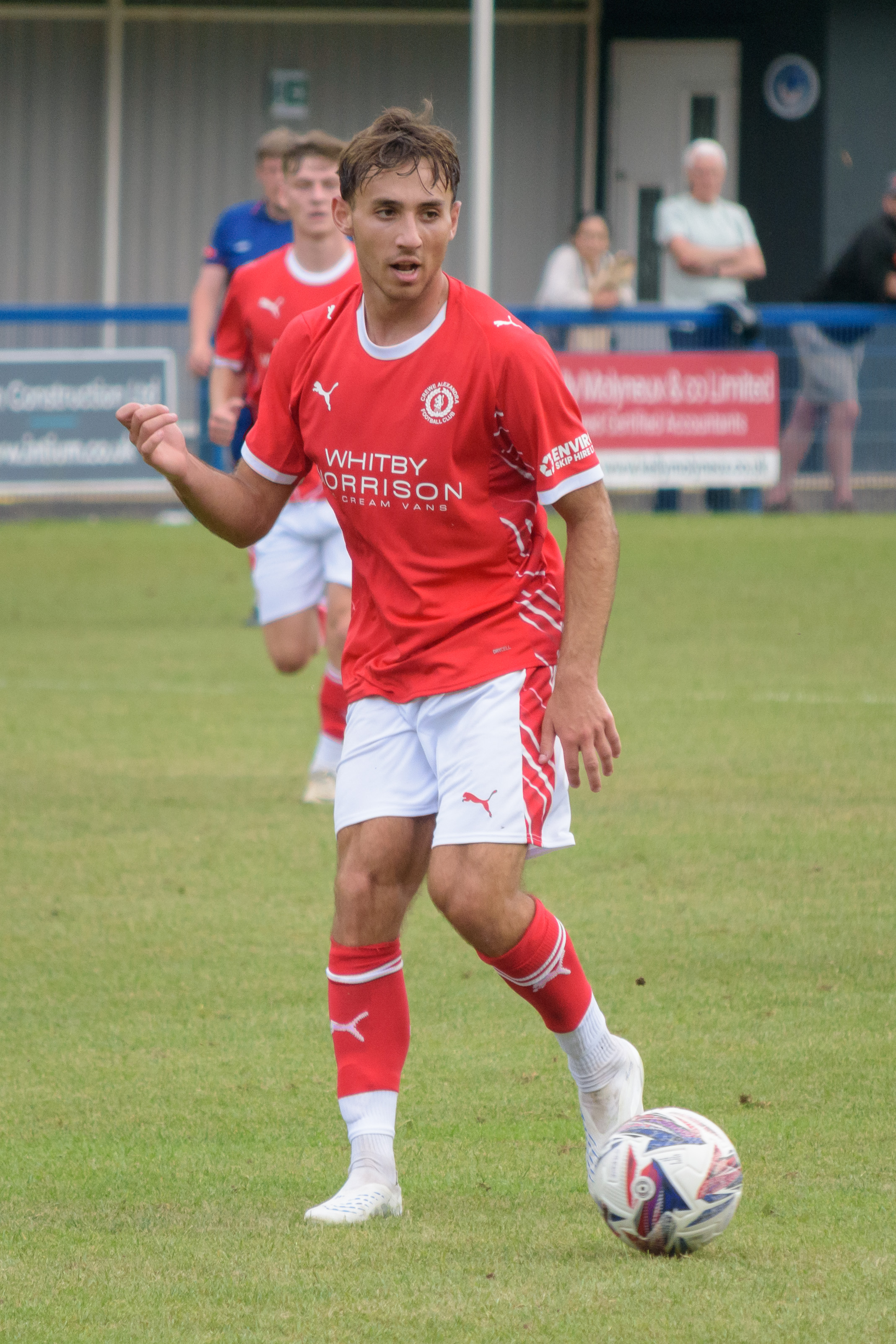
- Holíček playing for Crewe Alexandra in 2025

Personal information
- Full name: Matús Holíček
- Date of birth: 25 January 2005 (age 21)
- Place of birth: Slovakia
- Height: 6 ft 0 in (1.83 m)
- Position: Midfielder

Team information
- Current team: Crewe Alexandra
- Number: 17

Youth career
- 2012–2021: Crewe Alexandra

Senior career*
Years	Team	Apps	(Gls)
2021–	Crewe Alexandra	116	(5)

International career^{‡}
	Slovakia U15	7	(0)
2021-2022	Slovakia U17	8	(0)
2022–2023	Slovakia U18	5	(0)
2023	Slovakia U19	1	(0)
- * Club domestic league appearances and goals as of 16:35, 21 November 2026 (UTC) ‡ National team caps and goals as of 17:54, 7 September 2023 (UTC)

Matúš Holíček (born 25 January 2005) is a Slovak professional footballer who plays as a midfielder for EFL League Two club Crewe Alexandra.

== Club career ==
A graduate of Crewe Alexandra's Academy, Holíček signed a professional contract in 2022 despite having only completed the first year of his scholarship, before he made his debut for the club as a second-year scholar in their EFL Trophy game against Leeds United U21s on 1 November 2022, playing the first 54 minutes before being replaced by Tariq Uwakwe.

On his 18th birthday (25 January 2023), Holíček signed a long-term deal through to summer 2025, with an option for two further years. On 18 March 2023, Holíček made his first league appearance for Crewe, coming on as a 77th minute substitute for Callum Ainley in the side's 1–0 League Two defeat at Northampton Town. He scored his first Crewe goal in his side's 3–1 League Two win at Barrow on 20 January 2024.

== International career ==
After making seven appearances for Slovakia at Under-15 and eight appearances at Under-17 levels, Holíček was called up for their Under-18 squad for a friendly tournament, playing all three games against USA, Mexico and Finland on 21, 23 and 25 September 2022 respectively.

== Career statistics ==
As of 21 November 2026

Club	Season	Division	League		FA Cup		League Cup		Other		Total	
Club	Season	Division	Apps	Goals	Apps	Goals	Apps	Goals	Apps	Goals	Apps	Goals
Crewe Alexandra	2022–23	League Two	2	0	0	0	0	0	1 (Note: Appearances in EFL Trophy)	0	3	0
Crewe Alexandra	2023–24	League Two	26	1	0	0	2	0	3 (Note: Appearances in 2024 EFL play-offs)	0	31	1
Crewe Alexandra	2024–25	League Two	38	1	1	0	1	1	4	0	44	2
Crewe Alexandra	2025–26	League Two	35	3	1	0	0	0	1	0	37	3
Crewe Alexandra	2026–27	League Two	15	0	1	0	1	0	0	0	17	0
Crewe Alexandra	Total		116	5	3	0	4	1	9	0	132	6
