= Tommi O'Reilly =

English footballer (born 2003)

Personal information
- Full name: Tommi Dylan Brooklyn O'Reilly
- Date of birth: 15 December 2003 (age 22)
- Place of birth: Birmingham, England
- Height: 1.70 m (5 ft 7 in)
- Positions: Attacking midfielder; right winger

Team information
- Current team: Doncaster Rovers (on loan from Aston Villa)

Youth career
- 2010–2023: Aston Villa

Senior career*
Years	Team	Apps	(Gls)
2023–	Aston Villa	0	(0)
2024	→ Real Unión (loan)	2	(0)
2024–2025	→ Shrewsbury Town (loan)	12	(0)
2025	→ Milton Keynes Dons (loan)	16	(1)
2025–2026	→ Crewe Alexandra (loan)	46	(7)
2026–	→ Doncaster Rovers (loan)	4	(0)
- * Club domestic league appearances and goals as of 12:18, 21 September 2026 (UTC)

Tommi Dylan Brooklyn O'Reilly (born 15 December 2003) is an English professional footballer who plays as an attacking midfielder or right winger for EFL League One club Doncaster Rovers, on loan from Premier League club Aston Villa.

== Early life ==
O'Reilly joined the Aston Villa academy at the age of seven years-old. He is a fan of the club and attended the club's successful Wembley Stadium trip for the 2019 EFL Championship play-off final against Derby County on the terraces.

== Career ==
=== Early career and debut ===
O'Reilly was part of the Aston Villa side which won the 2021 FA Youth Cup. He signed his first professional contract with Aston Villa in March 2022.

During the 2021-22 season he was called up to first-team training by manager Steven Gerrard, and featured in friendly matches for the club. That season, he was included in Villa match-day squads and named as a substitute for matches in the Premier League without making his debut. He made his debut in the EFL Trophy against AFC Wimbledon in August 2022. The following season he captained the Aston Villa side in the competition.

On 14 December 2023, O'Reilly made his first team debut in a 1–1 UEFA Europa Conference League draw away at Zrinjski Mostar. On 19 January 2024, O'Reilly signed a new contract with Aston Villa.

=== Loan moves ===
On 1 February 2024, O'Reilly signed for Primera Federación club Real Unión, a sister club of Aston Villa managed by former Aston Villa U21 manager Iñigo Idiakez, on loan until the end of the season. O'Reilly made his debut from the bench in a 0–0 draw against Lugo on 3 February. O'Reilly's season was curtailed by injury, and he went onto make only 2 appearances at the Spanish club.

On 11 July 2024, O'Reilly signed for EFL League One club Shrewsbury Town on a season-long loan. On 10 August 2024, O'Reilly made his English Football League debut in a 1–0 defeat to Stevenage.

On 16 January 2025, O'Reilly was recalled from his loan at Shrewsbury after making 18 appearances in all competitions, and immediately loaned to League Two side Milton Keynes Dons. O'Reilly made his Dons debut on 21 January 2025, scoring in a 2–1 defeat to Fleetwood Town.

On 15 July 2025, O'Reilly joined League Two side Crewe Alexandra on a season-long loan. He made his debut in the side's 3–1 victory at Salford City on 2 August 2025, and two weeks later scored the decisive goal in Crewe's 1–0 defeat of Crawley Town at Gresty Road. He was voted as the Club's Player of the Year at the end of the 2025–26 season.

On 26 August 2026, O'Reilly joined League One side Doncaster Rovers on a season-long loan.

== International career ==
Born in England, O'Reilly is of Irish descent. He was called up to a training camp for the Ireland U19s in August 2021.

== Style of play ==
A diminutive but skillful midfielder, he has been nicknamed "Philly" or "Fodes" by his Aston Villa academy youth teammates because of a perceived similarity to Phil Foden in his playing style. He has also been nicknamed "Tommi Wilshere", after Jack Wilshere, in his time at Villa.

== Career statistics ==
As of match played 6 October 2026

Appearances and goals by club, season, and competition
Club	Season	League			National cup		League cup		Europe		Other		Total	
Club	Season	Division	Apps	Goals	Apps	Goals	Apps	Goals	Apps	Goals	Apps	Goals	Apps	Goals
Aston Villa	2022–23	Premier League	0	0	0	0	0	0	—		3 (Note: Appearances in EFL Trophy)	0	3	0
Aston Villa	2023–24	Premier League	0	0	0	0	0	0	1 (Note: Appearance in UEFA Europa Conference League)	0	3	0	4	0
Aston Villa	2024–25	Premier League	0	0	0	0	0	0	0	0	0	0	0	0
Aston Villa	2025–26	Premier League	0	0	0	0	0	0	0	0	0	0	0	0
Aston Villa	2026–27	Premier League	0	0	0	0	0	0	0	0	1	1	1	1
Aston Villa	Total		0	0	0	0	0	0	1	0	7	1	8	1
Real Unión (loan)	2023–24	Primera Federación	2	0	—		—		—		0	0	2	0
Shrewsbury Town (loan)	2024–25	League One	12	0	1	0	2	0	—		3	0	18	0
Milton Keynes Dons (loan)	2024–25	League Two	16	1	0	0	—		—		0	0	16	1
Crewe Alexandra (loan)	2025–26	League Two	46	7	1	0	1	0	—		2	0	50	7
Doncaster Rovers (loan)	2026–27	League One	4	0	0	0	—		—		1	1	5	1
Career total			80	8	2	0	3	0	1	0	13	2	98	10

== Honours ==
Aston Villa U18

- FA Youth Cup: 2020–21

Individual

- Crewe Alexandra Player of the Year: 2025–26
