= Alex Morris (footballer) =

English football manager (born 1983)

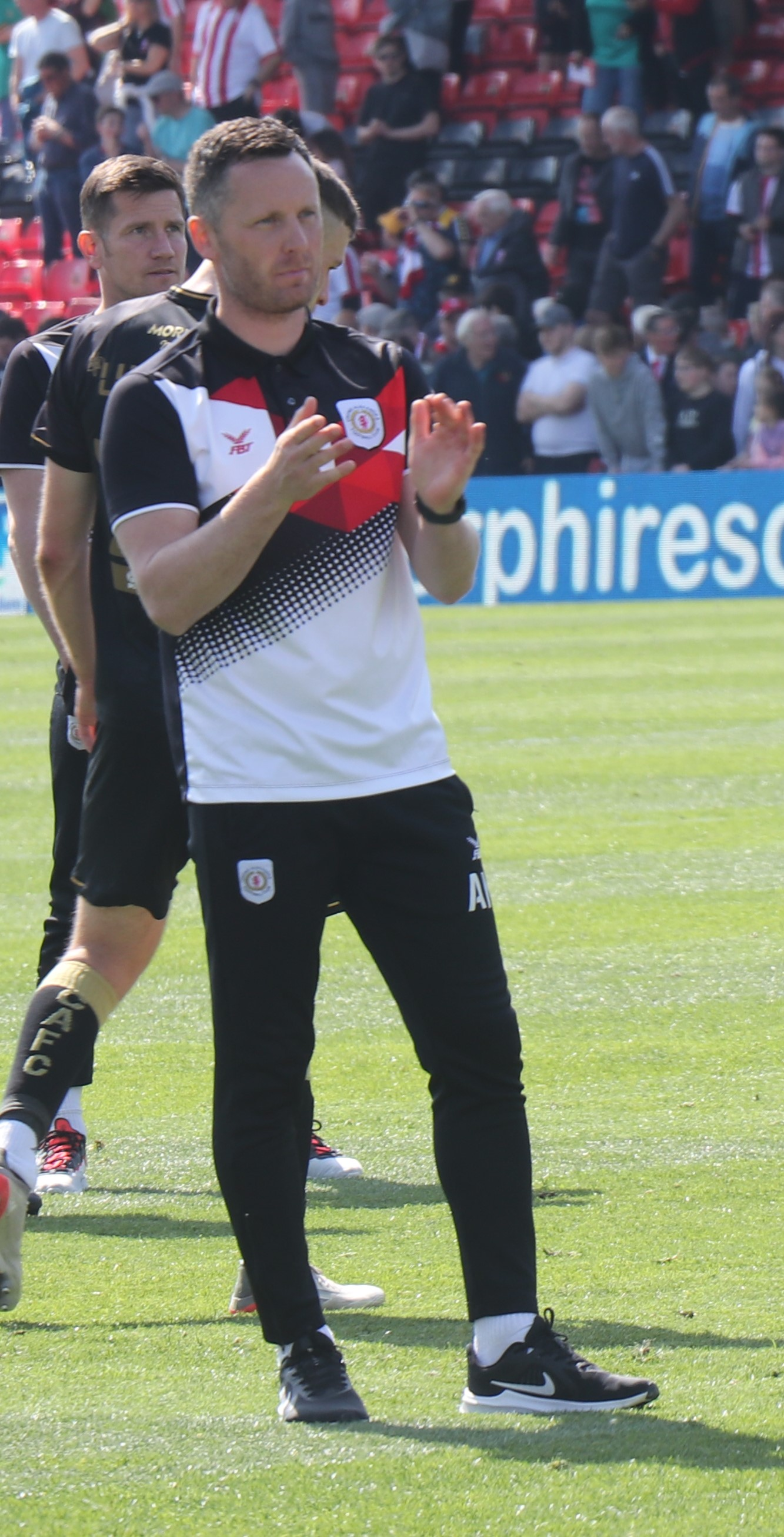
- Morris as Crewe manager in April 2022

Personal information
- Full name: Alexander Morris
- Date of birth: 5 October 1983 (age 43)
- Place of birth: Crewe, England
- Height: 5 ft 11 in (1.80 m)
- Position: Midfielder

Team information
- Current team: Bradford City (assistant manager)

Youth career
- Years: Team
- 1995–2002: Crewe Alexandra

Managerial career
- 2022: Crewe Alexandra
- 2023–2024: Stoke City U21
- 2024: Stoke City (caretaker)

Alex Morris (born 5 October 1983) is an English professional football coach who is the assistant manager at Bradford City.

== Playing career ==
Morris joined Crewe Alexandra's youth system aged 12 as a midfielder in 1995 and was a contemporary of players including Dean Ashton, David Vaughan and Lee Bell.

He was a member of Crewe's reserve side which won the Cheshire Senior Cup in 2003. Despite injury difficulties including a stress fracture of his shin, Morris was, alongside fellow Academy graduate Chris McCready, offered a one-year contract by manager Dario Gradi in 2004. He remained part of Gradi's first team squad until 2006, but injuries prevented him from making a first-team appearance for the club and forced his early retirement as a player.

== Coaching career ==
=== Crewe Alexandra ===
Morris then focussed on earning coaching qualifications, working in Crewe's Academy set-up. He was manager of Crewe's under-18 side that reached the quarter-final of the 2015 FA Youth Cup, beating Arsenal, Bolton and Fulham en route to defeat by eventual finalists Manchester City.

After club manager Steve Davis was sacked in January 2017, the new incoming manager David Artell made Morris part of his senior management team alongside assistant Kenny Lunt. Morris managed the Crewe reserve side which won the Cheshire Senior Cup in May 2017.

Some five years later, as Crewe struggled to avoid relegation from EFL League One, Artell reshuffled his management team, appointing Morris as assistant manager, with Lunt becoming player development manager. After the club was relegated with four games still to play, Crewe parted company with Artell on 11 April 2022, and Morris was appointed interim manager to the end of the 2021–22 season, with Lee Bell as his assistant.

Morris said he wanted Crewe to make the most of a "mini two-week season" comprising their final four League One fixtures, while also declaring his interest in becoming the next Crewe manager: "I'd love to take the job long-term. I've been at this club for a long, long time and I believe I have the credentials." Crewe won their first game under Morris, a 3–1 home victory over AFC Wimbledon on 15 April 2022. Morris was appointed the permanent manager on 28 April 2022.

With Crewe winless in nine games, on 4 November 2022, Morris stepped down as Crewe Alexandra manager "for compassionate reasons" and reverted to assistant manager with Bell becoming interim and eventually permanent manager.

=== Stoke City ===
In June 2023, Crewe announced Morris's departure to take up a role at Championship club Stoke City as U21 head coach. Morris moved up to work with the first team in July 2024. On 16 September 2024, after Steven Schumacher was sacked, Morris and Ryan Shawcross briefly became caretaker managers, overseeing one game before Narcís Pèlach was announced as Stoke's new manager on 18 September 2024. Morris left his position at Stoke in January 2025.

=== Wycombe Wanderers ===
In October 2025, Morris was announced as a first team coach at Wycombe Wanderers. On 8 September 2026, manager Michael Duff and Morris were dismissed after no wins in the first five league games.

=== Bradford City ===
In October 20276 he was appointed assistant manager at Bradford City, under Michael Duff.

== Managerial statistics ==
As of match played 17 September 2024

Managerial record by team and tenure
Team	From	To	Record				
Team	From	To	P	W	D	L	Win %
Crewe Alexandra	11 April 2022	4 November 2022	20	5	8	7	25.0
Stoke City (caretaker)	16 September 2024	18 September 2024	1	0	1	0	0.0
Total			21	5	9	7	23.8
