= Max Sanders =

English footballer (born 1999)

Personal information
- Full name: Max Harrison Sanders
- Date of birth: 4 January 1999 (age 27)
- Place of birth: Horsham, England
- Height: 5 ft 10 in (1.78 m)
- Position: Midfielder

Team information
- Current team: Notts County
- Number: 6

Youth career
- –2017: Brighton & Hove Albion

Senior career*
Years	Team	Apps	(Gls)
2017–2021	Brighton & Hove Albion	0	(0)
2019–2020	→ AFC Wimbledon (loan)	20	(1)
2021–2023	Lincoln City	57	(1)
2023–2024	Leyton Orient	27	(1)
2024–2026	Crewe Alexandra	78	(3)
2026–	Notts County	0	(0)

International career
2018	England U19	4	(0)
- * Club domestic league appearances and goals as of 10:24, 1 July 2026 (UTC)

Max Harrison Sanders (born 4 January 1999) is an English professional footballer who plays as a midfielder for EFL League One club Notts County.

== Early life ==
Sanders grew up in Horsham and attended Tanbridge House School in the town.

== Club career ==
=== Brighton & Hove Albion ===
Before joining Brighton & Hove Albion's academy, Sanders had been with AFC Wimbledon's academy.

Sanders was first named in a matchday squad for Brighton & Hove Albion on 17 March 2018; he remained an unused substitute in a 2–0 defeat to Manchester United in the FA Cup sixth round.

==== Wimbledon (loan) ====
Sanders joined AFC Wimbledon on loan from Brighton on 2 September 2019. He subsequently made his professional debut for AFC Wimbledon on 7 September 2019, replacing Scott Wagstaff in the 45th minute of a 1–2 defeat to Milton Keynes Dons. Sanders' sole goal during his loan spell at Wimbledon came on 15 February 2020, in a 2–2 draw to Rotherham United in League One.

==== 2020–21 ====
On 1 July 2020, Sanders signed a new one-year contract with Brighton which extended his stay at the club until the end of the 2020–21 season. He made his debut for The Seagulls coming on as a sub in a 4–0 victory over Portsmouth in the EFL Cup on 17 September 2020. 6 days later he started in The Seagulls 2–0 away win over Preston, this appearance also coming in the EFL Cup. He made his third and final League Cup appearance of the season as an 81st-minute substitute for Jayson Molumby which The Seagulls lost 3–0 at home to Manchester United on 30 September falling short of the quarter-finals.

=== Lincoln City ===
On 1 February 2021, Sanders signed for Lincoln City for an undisclosed fee, with a deal running until 2023. Sanders was encouraged by Brighton sporting director Dan Ashworth to sign for Lincoln in order to play under Michael Appleton. He made his debut on 17 February, starting in the EFL Trophy semi-final away at Sunderland, being replaced in the 58th minute in an eventual penalty shootout loss after a 1–1 draw. He made his league debut for The Imps three days later, coming on as a substitute in the 72nd minute, one minute before Lincoln's winning goal in a 2–1 away victory over Wigan.

He scored his first goal for the side on 6 November 2021, scoring the only goal of the FA Cup first round fixture at home against Bowers & Pitsea. On 10 May 2023, it was announced in the clubs retained list that Sanders would leave the club at the end of his contract.

=== Leyton Orient ===
On 21 June 2023, Sanders became the first summer signing for newly promoted Leyton Orient. He signed a two-year contract, and made 30 appearances, scoring once, for the London club.

=== Crewe Alexandra ===
On 3 July 2024, Sanders joined Crewe Alexandra on a two-year deal for an undisclosed fee. He made his debut in the side's League Two opener away at Barrow. He scored his first Crewe goal on 6 October 2025, the winner in a 2–1 League Two victory at Harrogate Town. Just over two months later, on 13 December 2025, he scored the opening two goals in Crewe's 4–1 League Two win at Tranmere Rovers.

=== Notts County ===
In June 2026, it was announced Sanders had rejected a new contract at the Alex and would sign for Notts County on a two-year deal with the option of a further year in the club's favour. Sanders picked up a calf problem in preseason and will suffer 3 months on the sidelines.

== Career statistics ==
As of match played 18 April 2026

Appearances and goals by club, season and competition
Club	Season	League			FA Cup		EFL Cup		Other		Total	
Club	Season	Division	Apps	Goals	Apps	Goals	Apps	Goals	Apps	Goals	Apps	Goals
Brighton & Hove Albion	2019–20	Premier League	0	0	0	0	0	0	—		0	0
Brighton & Hove Albion	2020–21	Premier League	0	0	0	0	3	0	—		3	0
Brighton & Hove Albion	Total		0	0	0	0	3	0	0	0	3	0
AFC Wimbledon (loan)	2019–20	League One	20	1	1	0	0	0	1 (Note: Appearance in EFL Trophy)	0	22	1
Lincoln City	2020–21	League One	5	0	0	0	0	0	1	0	6	0
Lincoln City	2021–22	League One	19	0	2	1	1	0	2	0	24	1
Lincoln City	2022–23	League One	33	1	1	0	4	0	4	0	42	1
Lincoln City	Total		57	1	3	1	5	0	7	0	72	2
Leyton Orient	2023–24	League One	27	1	1	0	0	0	2	0	30	1
Crewe Alexandra	2024–25	League Two	41	0	1	0	1	0	3	0	46	0
Crewe Alexandra	2025–26	League Two	37	3	1	0	0	0	2	0	40	3
Crewe Alexandra	Total		78	3	2	0	1	0	5	0	86	3
Career total			182	6	7	1	9	0	15	0	213	7
