= Christopher Flynn =

English-born Welsh footballer

Personal information
- Full name: Christopher Flynn
- Date of birth: 5 November 1987 (age 38)
- Place of birth: Market Drayton, England
- Positions: Defender; midfielder

Team information
- Current team: Nantwich Town

Youth career
- Crewe Alexandra

Senior career*
Years	Team	Apps	(Gls)
2006	Crewe Alexandra	1	(0)
2007	→ Cambridge United (loan)	1	(0)
2007–2008	Stafford Rangers	41	(2)
2008–2009	Northwich Victoria	13	(1)
2009	Stafford Rangers	?	(?)
2009	Eastwood Town	?	(?)
2009–	Nantwich Town		

International career
2005–	Wales U19		
2007	Wales U21	1	(0)
- * Club domestic league appearances and goals

Christopher Flynn (born 5 November 1987) is a Welsh footballer who plays for Nantwich Town.

== Career ==
Born in Market Drayton, England, Flynn is one of many players to be produced by the Crewe Alexandra production line. He first joined the club at the early age of nine, before making his way up the ranks at Crewe's academy, playing as a defender. However, Flynn soon moved out of his defensive position to take up a midfield role during his time in the under-18s squad. His has also gained a reputation for being utilised in several different positions

In June 2006, Flynn turned professional, following his impressive displays in the youth teams. The Welshman made his Crewe debut in their 5-1 League One defeat to Rotherham United. Three days later, he played his first cup match for Crewe against Rochdale, which Crewe won on penalties.

In an attempt to gain first team experience, Flynn was loaned out to Conference National side Cambridge United. There he played a single match, Cambridge's 4–0 away win over Northwich Victoria. Chris has played for the under 21s Welsh National Club in 2006. He was asked to return in 2008 however due to a date conflict, he was unable to commit to the signing.

Flynn joined Stafford Rangers in August 2007, and was signed by Northwich Victoria in 2008. In January 2009 he returned to Stafford Rangers on a non-contract basis. A month later he joined Eastwood Town, but ended up signing with Nantwich Town.
