= Kenny Lunt =

English footballer and coach

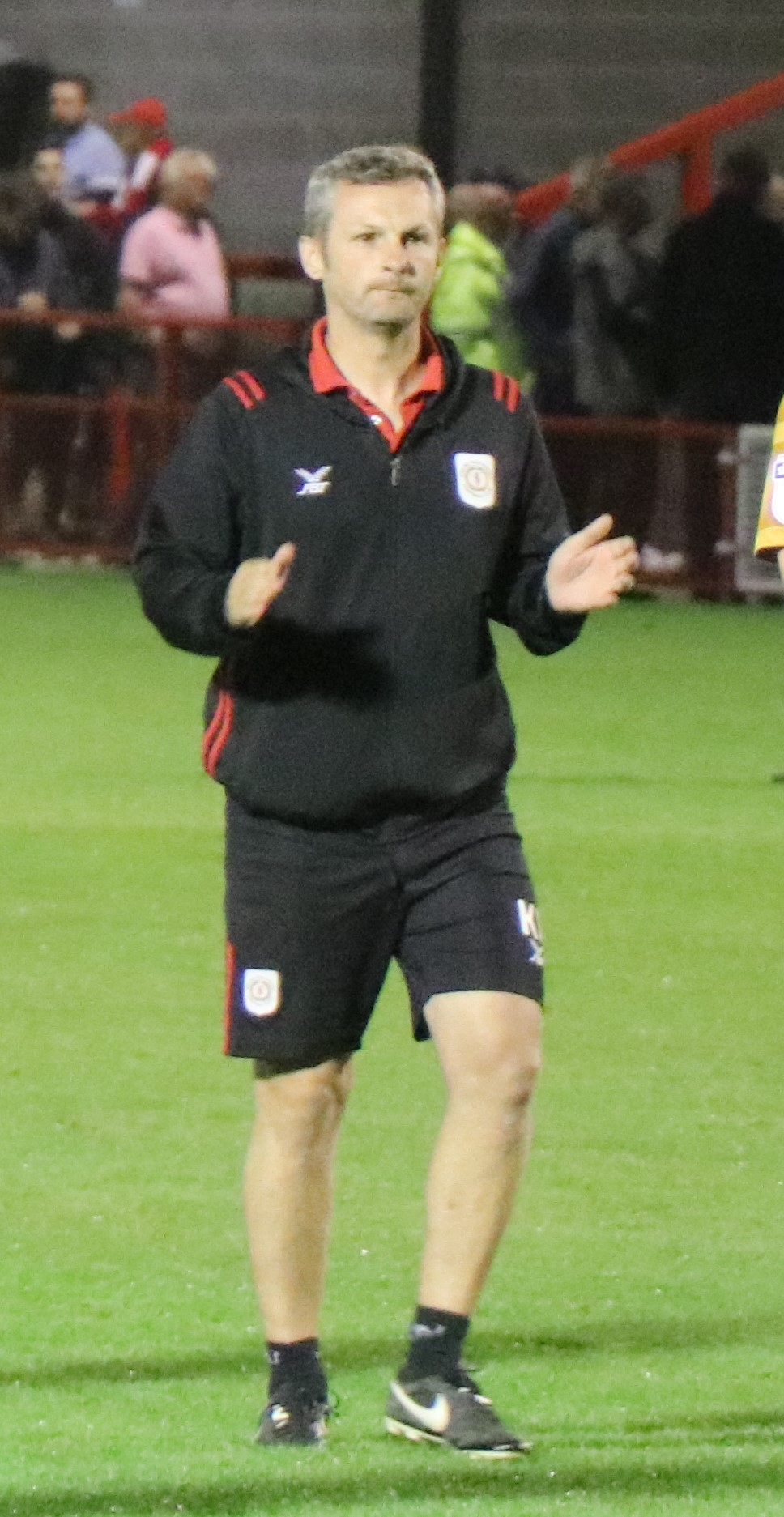
- Lunt (then Crewe assistant manager) at Crawley Town, August 2019

Personal information
- Full name: Kenneth Vincent Lunt
- Date of birth: 20 November 1979 (age 46)
- Place of birth: Runcorn, England
- Position: Midfielder

Team information
- Current team: Crewe Alexandra (player development manager)

Senior career*
Years	Team	Apps	(Gls)
1997–2006	Crewe Alexandra	373	(35)
2006–2009	Sheffield Wednesday	41	(0)
2008	→ Crewe Alexandra (loan)	14	(0)
2008	→ Crewe Alexandra (loan)	3	(0)
2009–2012	Hereford United	109	(1)
2012–2015	Bala Town	79	(9)
Total		619	(45)

Managerial career
- –2017: Crewe Alexandra (U18)
- 2017–2022: Crewe Alexandra (assistant)
- * Club domestic league appearances and goals

Kenneth Vincent Lunt (born 20 November 1979) is an English retired professional footballer and current football coach, who works for Crewe Alexandra as player development manager. Lunt previous played for Crewe, Sheffield Wednesday, Hereford United and Bala Town.

== Career ==
=== Crewe Alexandra ===
Lunt is one of many players to emerge from the Crewe Alexandra Academy – alongside Dean Ashton, Rob Hulse and Danny Murphy – nurtured by then manager, Dario Gradi and Crewe Alexandra "Centre of Excellence" manager Bill Prendergast. Having attended the National School at Lilleshall, in the same group of players as Michael Owen, Wes Brown and Michael Ball, Lunt made his Crewe debut, aged 17, on the first day of the 1997–98 season against Swindon Town. He went on to score on his home debut, hitting a 6th-minute volley against Bury in the League Cup.

Lunt completed more than seven years of first team football at Gresty Road, and was previously club captain at Crewe (replacing David Brammer, sold to Stoke City on a free transfer) – a role he shared with Steve Foster.

During Crewe's 2002–03 season in the Football League Second Division Lunt headed the rankings of goal assists. During his time at Crewe, Lunt made over 400 appearances for the club.

=== Sheffield Wednesday ===
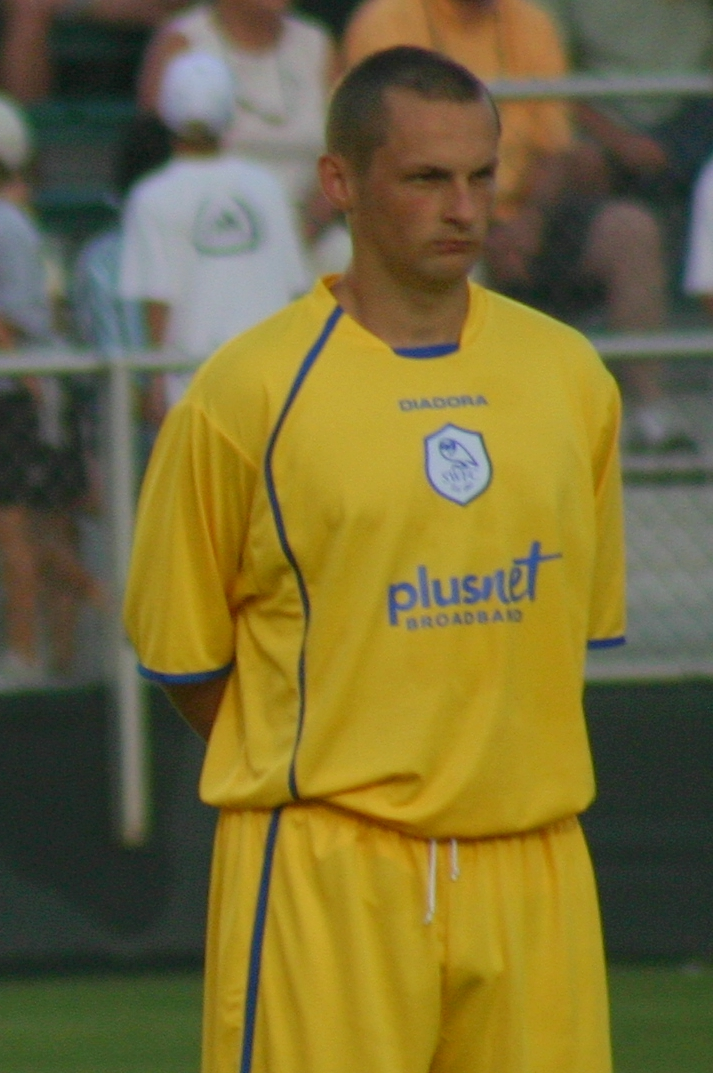
Lunt at Sheffield Wednesday, 2006

In May 2006, Sheffield Wednesday beat competition from several other Championship clubs to sign Lunt on a free transfer, offering him a three-year deal. Lunt made his debut for the Owls in their 1–0 defeat to Luton Town. In February 2008 Lunt rejoined Crewe Alexandra on loan until the end of the season.

By the beginning of the 2008–09 season manager Brian Laws stated that Lunt had no first team future at Sheffield Wednesday. Lunt refused to depart, but on 8 May 2009 Lunt and the club reached a mutual agreement to terminate his playing contract with immediate effect.

=== Hereford United ===
On 23 June 2009 Lunt signed a one-year contract with Football League Two club Hereford United and was named as captain. He was stripped of the captaincy of the club following a half-time argument with management during a League Cup match at Portsmouth. In May 2011 he signed a new one-year contract with the club.

=== Bala Town ===
In August 2012 Kenny Lunt signed for Welsh Premier League side Bala Town following his release from Hereford United.

== Coaching and management roles ==
Having previously been assistant academy director (and u18 manager) at Crewe, Lunt was appointed assistant to first team manager David Artell on 10 January 2017. In March 2022, Artell reshuffled his team and Lunt was appointed player development manager.

== Personal life ==
Lunt is the uncle of current Crewe midfielder Owen Lunt.

== Club statistics ==
All-Time Club Performance
Club	Season	Domestic League		FA Cup		League Cup		Total
Club	Season	App	Goals	App	Goals	App	Goals	App	Goals
Hereford United	11–12	25	0	0	0	2	0	28	0
Hereford United	10–11	42	0	4	0	1	0	48	0
Hereford United	09-10	42	1	2	0	2	0	50	1
Total	09-present	109	1	6	0	5	0	126	1
Sheffield Wednesday	07-08	4	0	1	0	3	0	8	0
Sheffield Wednesday	06-07	37	0	2	0	1	0	40	0
Total	06-09	41	0	3	0	4	0	48	0
Crewe Alexandra	08-09	3	0	1	0	0	0	4	0
Crewe Alexandra	07-08	14	0	0	0	0	0	14	0
Crewe Alexandra	05-06	43	4	1	0	1	0	45	4
Crewe Alexandra	04-05	46	5	1	0	3	0	50	5
Crewe Alexandra	03-04	45	7	1	0	2	0	49	7
Crewe Alexandra	02-03	46	7	4	0	2	0	52	7
Crewe Alexandra	01-02	46	5	4	0	3	0	53	5
Crewe Alexandra	00-01	46	1	3	0	4	0	53	1
Crewe Alexandra	99-00	43	3	1	0	5	0	49	3
Crewe Alexandra	98–99	18	1	1	0	3	0	22	1
Crewe Alexandra	97–98	40	2	0	0	2	1	42	3
Total	07-09 97-06	390	35	17	0	25	1	432	36
Career Totals	97-Present	540	36	26	0	34	1	606	38

As of 8 May 2012.

== Honours ==
with Crewe Alexandra

- Football League Second Division runner-up: 2002–03

Preceded by Steve Foster	Crewe Alexandra Captain; 2004–2006	Succeeded by Neil Cox
