= Lee Bell =

English footballer and manager (born 1983)

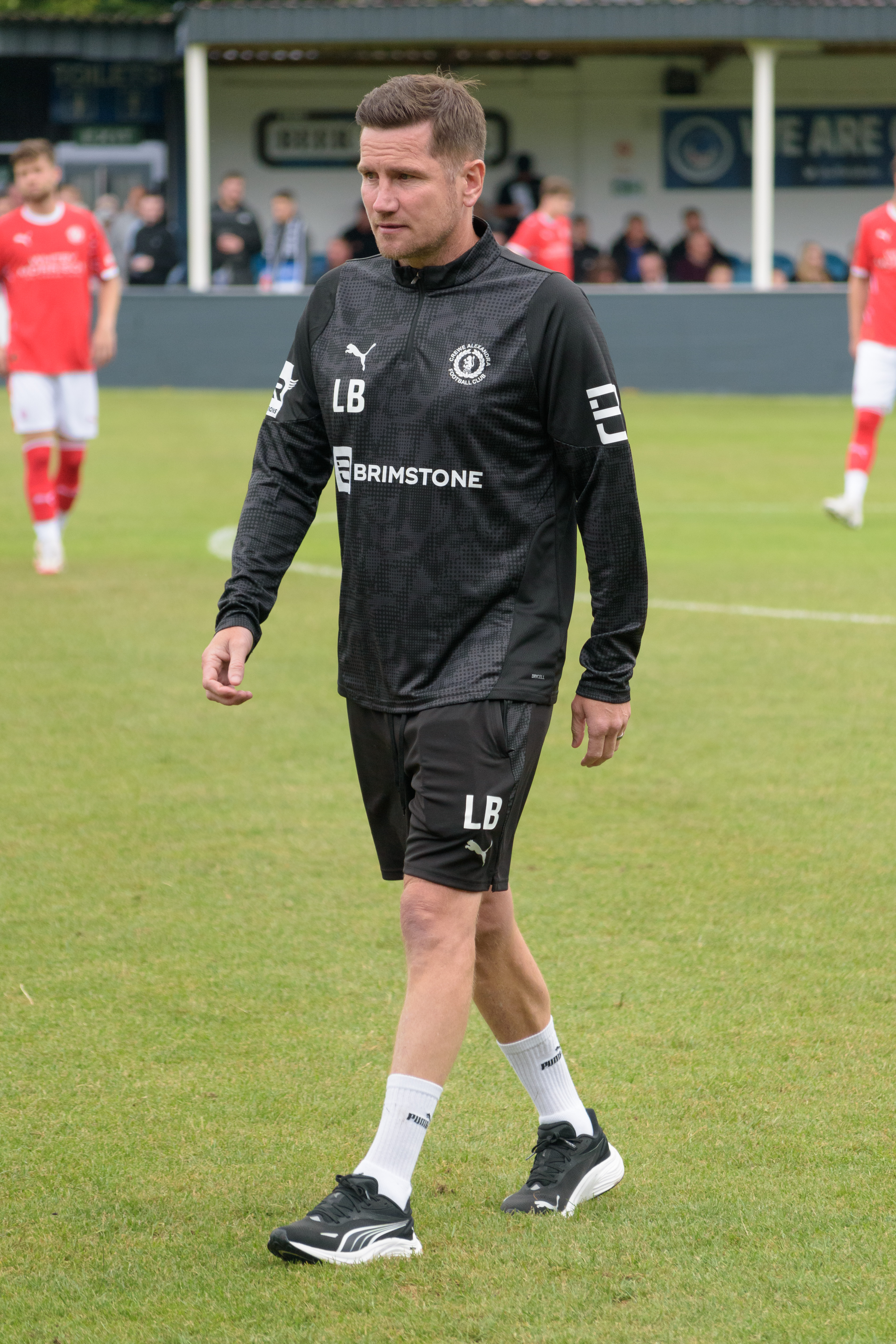
- Bell in 2025

Personal information
- Full name: Lee Bell
- Date of birth: 26 January 1983 (age 43)
- Place of birth: Alsager, England
- Height: 5 ft 10 in (1.78 m)
- Position: Midfielder

Team information
- Current team: Crewe Alexandra (manager)

Youth career
- 1997–2002: Crewe Alexandra

Senior career*
Years	Team	Apps	(Gls)
2002–2007	Crewe Alexandra	53	(3)
2003	→ Shrewsbury Town (loan)	3	(0)
2005	→ Burton Albion (loan)	6	(1)
2007	→ Burton Albion (loan)	12	(0)
2007–2008	Mansfield Town	23	(1)
2008–2010	Macclesfield Town	83	(3)
2010–2012	Crewe Alexandra	75	(1)
2012–2015	Burton Albion	82	(6)
2015	→ Macclesfield Town (loan)	10	(3)
Total		347	(18)

Managerial career
- 2022–: Crewe Alexandra
- * Club domestic league appearances and goals

Lee Bell (born 26 January 1983) is an English former professional footballer who played as a midfielder. He is manager of EFL League Two club Crewe Alexandra.

He began his career at Crewe Alexandra, also playing for Burton Albion, Mansfield Town and Macclesfield Town, before returning in succession to Crewe, Burton Albion and latterly Macclesfield Town on loan from Burton. Bell retired from playing in the summer of 2015, aged 32, and rejoined Crewe as under-18s coach, later becoming under-18s manager (January 2017), under-23s manager (March 2022), assistant first team manager (April 2022), and then first team manager (November 2022).

== Playing career ==
=== Crewe Alexandra ===
Bell was born in Alsager, Cheshire He is a product of the Crewe Alexandra academy system, having signed schoolboy terms with the club in 1997, on the same day as David Vaughan.

In January 2001 he had a training ground bust-up with Colin Cramb, who subsequently left Gresty Road and indeed the country. Despite this, Bell was awarded a professional contract in February 2001. He made his debut for the first team, coming on as a substitute on the opening day of the 2002–03 season against Northampton Town. A week later to his debut, Bell scored his first professional goal, in a 2–0 win over Colchester United. His playing time at Crewe soon earned him a new contract in February 2003. He made 22 appearances in the 2002–03 promotion campaign, mostly as a substitute.

However, in the 2003–04 season, Bell lost his first team place following the arrival of Justin Cochrane and joined Football Conference side, Shrewsbury on loan in October 2003, but an injury restricted his opportunities and he returned to Crewe in January 2004. Bell established himself in the first team in December 2004, starting 18 times in the remainder of the 2004–05 season, and signed a new two-year contract in June 2005.

After falling down the pecking order at the start of the 2005–06 season, Bell joined Burton Albion on a one-month loan in October 2005, which was extended for a further month. After a two-month loan spell at Burton Albion, Bell returned to Crewe and made 18 appearances in the 2005–06 season, scoring two more goals against Reading and Brighton & Hove Albion.

A broken foot and an ankle injury caused Bell to miss the start of the 2006–07 season. After being limited to one first team appearance, he had a request to leave Crewe granted in January 2007, and joined Burton Albion on a contract until the end of the season. After making twelve appearances for the club, Bell was released.

=== Mansfield Town ===
After leaving Burton Albion, Bell went on a trial at Mansfield Town. Following a successful trial, Bell joined Mansfield Town in August 2007. Bell made his Mansfield Town debut in the opening game of the season, in a 1–1 draw against Brentford and then scored his first Mansfield Town goal, in a 2–1 loss against Morecambe on 12 February 2008.

He made 27 appearances for Mansfield in the 2007–08 season, before suffering a serious knee injury in February 2008 that ruled him out for most of the rest of the season.

=== Macclesfield Town ===
After Mansfield Town were relegated to the Conference National at the end of the 2007–08 season, Bell was released by the club, and joined Macclesfield Town on a one-year contract.

After being on the bench in the opening game of the season against Shrewsbury Town, Bell made his Macclesfield Town debut, in a 2–0 loss against Bradford City on 16 August 2008. Four months on 12 December 2008, Bell scored his first goal for the club, in a 4–2 win over Chesterfield. He impressed at the club in 2008–09, making a total of 47 appearances, and signed a one-year extension to his contract in June 2009.

He played 44 games in 2009–10, where he scored two goals against Dagenham & Redbridge and Barnet. As a result, Bell was voted the club's Player of the Year. However, Bell was released by the club, along with ten other players, in May 2010.

=== Crewe Alexandra (second spell) ===
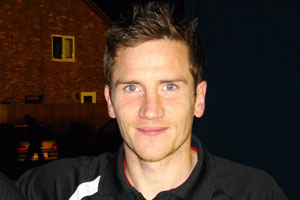
Bell in 2010

Bell was re-signed by Crewe Alexandra on a two-year contract in May 2010, with manager Dario Gradi looking to add experience to the squad. Upon re-signing for Crewe, Bell revealed he took a pay-cut, in order to join the club despite other interest.

Bell's first appearance since leaving the club three years earlier came in the opening game of the season, when they lost 1–0 to Hereford United. During the 2010–11 season, Bell was one of three regular club captains, along with David Artell and Ashley Westwood. Bell scored his first goal for the club and set up the fifth goal for Clayton Donaldson in a 5–5 draw thriller against Chesterfield on 2 October 2010. However, Bell was involved in a confrontation with the club's supporters at the end of the game, an incident which caused Bell to apologise. He went on to make 44 league appearances for the club during the 2011–12 season, having missed one game due to suspension after accumulating five yellow cards.

Ahead of the 2011–12 season, Bell said he was willing to share the captaincy with Artell and Westwood for the second time. In January 2012, Bell suffered a groin injury. He also required surgery for a hernia. In a draw against Crawley Town on 2 April 2012, Bell conceded a penalty when he handled in the area. Crawley Town successfully converted to make it 1-1. Bell went on to make thirty appearances for the club.

He helped the club to reach the play-offs in 2011–12, and was a last second substitute as the Railwaymen secured victory in the League Two play-off final at Wembley Stadium. However, he was released by new boss Steve Davis a few days later, and was heavily linked with a move to nearby Port Vale.

=== Burton Albion ===
After leaving Crewe Alexandra for the second time, Bell went on trial at Burton Albion, linking with them for the third time of his career. Bell was then involved in a pre-season friendly against Aston Villa, where he impressed. Following his trial, Bell signed a one-year contract with Burton.

Bell re-debut for Burton Albion for the third time in the first round of League Cup, in a 2–2 draw against Sheffield United and played 120 minutes. Bell was the only Burton Albion's player to be missed, as they beat them 5–4 in the penalty shoot-out. In the next game in the opening game of the season against Rotherham United, Bell started in the match, but was sent-off in the 62nd minute after a second bookable offense, in a 3–0 loss. After serving a suspension, Bell was able to make amends when he scored his first Burton Albion goal of the season, in a 3–1 win over York City on 19 September 2012. In the second round of the FA Cup, Bell captained Burton Albion for the first time against his former club, Crewe. Weeks later, on 29 December 2012, Bell scored his second goal for the club and setting up the second goal of the game, in a 2–0 win over Southend United. Bell later added two more goals later in the season against Exeter City and Dagenham & Redbridge. During the season, Bell, who had captain the team for a number of games during the season, helped the club to their highest ever finish in the football league. Their 4th place in League Two saw them face Bradford City in the playoffs. Bell, however, received a four-game suspension for a red card given towards the end of the season and was unavailable for the final, should Burton Albion have reached it. After the club were unsuccessful in the play-offs, Bell made 43 appearances in his first full season at the club. Bell won the club's Player of the Year award and was rewarded with a new one-year contract in April 2013.

In the 2013–14 season, Bell was appointed as the new club captain. However, Bell was in and out of the starting eleven during the season, often featuring on the substitute bench. Later in the season, Bell scored his first goal of the season, in a 3–0 win over Hartlepool United on 19 April 2014. For the second time running. Bell helped the club reach the play-offs by finishing sixth place and ultimately reaching the final, which they lost 1–0 against Fleetwood Town. After making 34 appearances for the club, Bell was once again rewarded with a one-year contract extension for the second time running.

In the 2014–15 season, Bell missed the start of the season, due to a knee injury, which he sustained in the play-offs final three month earlier. After making a brief return against Mansfield Town, Bell find himself competing with newly signing John Mousinho over the starting eleven squad. Bell scored his first Burton Albion goal of the season, in a 4–3 win over Carlisle United on 21 October 2014. Following Gary Rowett's departure to Birmingham City, Jimmy Floyd Hasselbaink was appointed new manager of the club. Under his management, Bell was rarely used in the first team, making only one substitute appearance, and was informed by Hasselbaink that he would not feature in the team and he should look for a move.

=== Macclesfield Town (loan) and retirement ===
On transfer deadline day 2 February 2015, Bell returned to Macclesfield Town on loan until the end of the season. Bell's first appearance for Macclesfield Town since leaving the club five years earlier came on 7 February 2015, playing 90 minutes, in a 3–2 win over Welling United. Bell then scored three goals in three consecutive matches between 6 April 2015 and 18 April 2015 against Wrexham Forest Green Rovers, and Dartford. Upon returning to his parent club, Bell was released by the club.

== Coaching roles ==
=== Crewe Alexandra ===
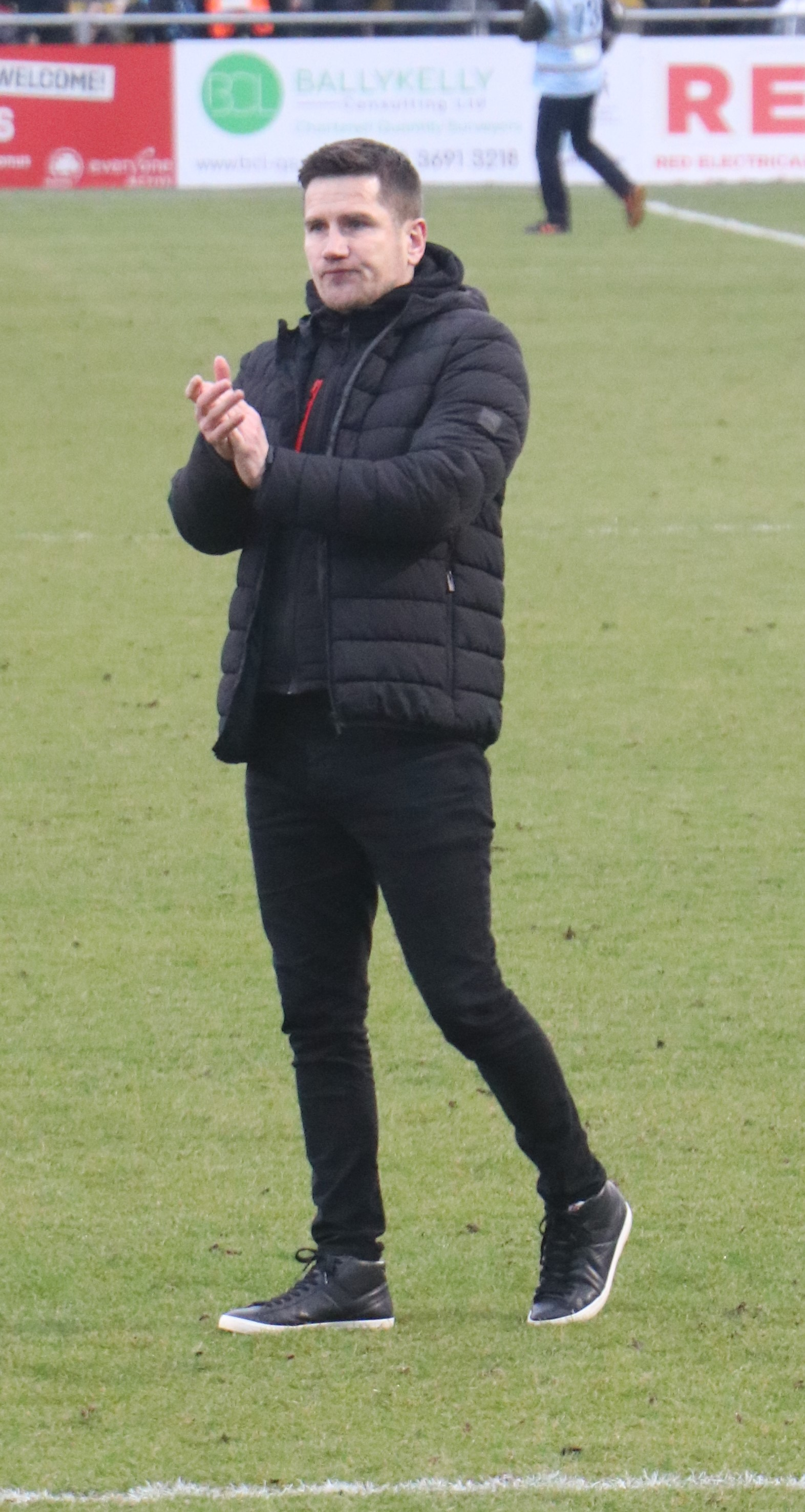
Bell applauding Crewe Alexandra supporters in 2023

Bell retired from playing in the summer of 2015, aged 32, and rejoined Crewe as under-18s coach, and was promoted to under-18s manager in January 2017 during a coaching reshuffle following the appointment of David Artell as new first team manager. In March 2022, Artell reshuffled his team again and Bell was appointed under-23s manager, before being appointed the assistant manager to Alex Morris when he became permanent manager on 28 April 2022. On 4 November 2022, Bell was appointed Crewe Alexandra's interim manager after Morris stepped down for compassionate reasons to become assistant manager. On 1 December 2022, Bell was given the job on a permanent basis.

On 17 February 2024, Bell confronted the referee David Rock immediately after the final whistle of the club's goalless draw against Harrogate Town at Gresty Road. He was red-carded and later handed a one-game touchline ban, forcing him to watch Crewe play Morecambe on 2 March 2024 from the stands. In his first full season as manager, Bell took the side to 6th place in the 2023–24 season; in the play-offs, they beat Doncaster Rovers to reach the play-off final, where they lost to Crawley Town.

On 16 December 2024, following a strong start to the 2024–25 season, the club confirmed that Bell had turned down an approach from another (unnamed) club, opting to remain at Crewe. Under Bell, Crewe were in the automatic promotion places until late January 2025, but won just three of their last 18 games to eventually finish 13th. The following season, Crewe were in 6th place with 12 games left on 23 February 2026, but, due to numerous player injuries, were (in Bell's words) "down to the bare bones".

== Personal life ==
Bell was a columnist for the Burton Mail.

== Career statistics ==
Appearances and goals by club, season and competition
Club	Season	League			FA Cup		League Cup		Other		Total	
Club	Season	Division	Apps	Goals	Apps	Goals	Apps	Goals	Apps	Goals	Apps	Goals
Crewe Alexandra	2002–03	Second Division	16	1	2	0	0	0	4 (Note: Appearance(s) in Football League Trophy)	0	22	1
Crewe Alexandra	2003–04	First Division	3	0	0	0	0	0	0	0	3	0
Crewe Alexandra	2004–05	Championship	17	0	1	0	0	0	0	0	18	0
Crewe Alexandra	2005–06	Championship	17	2	1	0	0	0	0	0	18	2
Crewe Alexandra	2006–07	League One	0	0	0	0	1	0	0	0	1	0
Crewe Alexandra	Total		53	3	4	0	1	0	4	0	62	3
Shrewsbury Town (loan)	2003–04	Conference National	3	0	0	0	0	0	1	0	4	0
Burton Albion (loan)	2005–06	Conference National	6	1	0	0	0	0	0	0	6	1
Burton Albion (loan)	2006–07	Conference National	12	0	0	0	0	0	0	0	12	0
Mansfield Town	2007–08	League Two	23	1	4	0	1	0	0	0	28	1
Macclesfield Town	2008–09	League Two	41	1	3	0	2	0	1	0	47	1
Macclesfield Town	2009–10	League Two	42	2	1	0	1	0	0	0	44	2
Macclesfield Town	Total		83	3	4	0	3	0	1	0	91	3
Crewe Alexandra	2010–11	League Two	45	1	1	0	2	0	2	1	50	2
Crewe Alexandra	2011–12	League Two	30	0	1	0	1	0	4 (Note: One appearance in Football League Trophy, three appearances in Football League Two play-offs)	0	36	0
Crewe Alexandra	Total		75	1	2	0	3	0	6	1	86	2
Burton Albion	2012–13	League Two	43	4	4	0	3	0	1	0	51	4
Burton Albion	2013–14	League Two	34	1	4	0	2	0	3 (Note: Appearances in Football League Two play-offs)	0	43	1
Burton Albion	2014–15	League Two	5	1	1	0	0	0	1	0	7	1
Burton Albion	Total		82	6	9	0	5	0	5	0	101	6
Macclesfield Town (loan)	2014–15	Conference	10	3	0	0	0	0	0	0	10	3
Career total			347	18	23	0	13	0	17	1	400	19

== Managerial statistics ==
As of match played 21 November 2026

Managerial record by team and tenure
Team	From	To	Record				
Team	From	To	P	W	D	L	Win %
Crewe Alexandra	4 November 2022	Present	215	80	64	71	37.2
Total			215	80	64	71	37.2

== Honours ==
Crewe Alexandra

- Football League Second Division second-place promotion: 2002–03
- Football League Two play-offs: 2012

Individual

- Macclesfield Town Player of the Year: 2009–10
- Burton Albion Player of the Year: 2012–13
