= Breckin =

Breckin is a surname. Notable people with the surname include:

- Ian Breckin (born 1975), former English footballer
- John Breckin (born 1953), former English footballer
- Kian Breckin (born 2003), English footballer
- Mike Breckin (born 1946), former British fencer
- Sian Breckin (born 1982), British actress

== See also ==
- Breckin Meyer (born 1974), American actor etc.
