= 2014–15 Brentford F.C. season =

English football team season

Brentford
2014–15 season
- Owner: Matthew Benham
- Chairman: Cliff Crown
- Manager: Mark Warburton
- Championship: 5th
- FA Cup: Third round
- League Cup: Second round
- Play-offs: Semi-finals, knocked out by Middlesbrough
- Top goalscorer: League: Andre Gray (16); All: Andre Gray (17)
- Highest home attendance: 12,225 (21 November 2014 v Fulham)
- Lowest home attendance: 8,765 (24 February 2015 v Blackpool)
- Average home league attendance: 10,822
Home colours	Away colours

The 2014–15 season was the 125th season of competitive association football and 95th season in the English Football League played by Brentford, an English football club based in Brentford in the London Borough of Hounslow. Their second-place finish in the 2013–14 season guaranteed promotion to the Championship from League One. The season covers the period from 1 July 2014 to 30 June 2015.

== Season review ==
=== Pre-season ===
After securing the signing of former loanee Alan Judge, Brentford continued strengthening their squad with the arrival of Marcos Tébar, Andre Gray, Moses Odubajo, Scott Hogan, Daniel O'Shaughnessy, Tommy Smith and Nick Proschwitz. Following the rejection of a new contract, Clayton Donaldson signed for Birmingham City and fellow striker Luke Norris departed for Gillingham. Will Grigg moved to MK Dons on a season-long loan and Alex Pritchard joined the Bees on a similar loan deal from Tottenham Hotspur. Jake Bidwell, Stuart Dallas and David Button signed new deals that secured their services until 2017 while the Development Squad was strengthened with new additions and the retention of existing squad members.

=== August ===
Brentford's season began at home with a 1–1 draw against London rivals Charlton Athletic. Igor Vetokele put the visitors ahead in the 63rd minute heading in from an in-swinging corner. The Addicks had a chance to wrap the game up soon after but failed to capitalise from an open goal when David Button was caught away from his line. Debutant Tommy Smith came off the bench to grab an equaliser for the Bees, slotting home via a deflection in the 85th minute. In the first round of the League Cup Brentford needed extra time and a penalty shoot out to see off League Two side Dagenham & Redbridge. In a 6–6 thriller Stuart Dallas scored a brace, before Nick Proschwitz, Andre Gray and Montell Moore scored their first goals for the club. Harlee Dean netted a sixth in extra time to bring the match to penalties, and the Daggers missed two as Brentford converted four in a row to secure the win.

Spanish midfielder Jota signed from Celta de Vigo on a permanent deal and Arsenal midfielder Jon Toral joined on a season-long loan on 15 August. The Bees suffered their first defeat of the new campaign away to Bournemouth at Dean Court with Junior Stanislas scoring the only goal of the match in the 72nd minute in an even contest. Three days later a 2–1 win away to Blackpool moved the team up to 12th in the league table. After going a goal down an Alex Pritchard strike levelled the teams at half time. A persistent Stuart Dallas slotted home in the 52nd minute and The Bees held on to gain their first away win in the Championship. Ex-Bee Clayton Donaldson returned to Griffin Park with Birmingham City on 23 August and was brought down in Brentford's penalty area by Tony Craig which resulted in Craig's dismissal. Paul Caddis sent Button the wrong way to convert the penalty and put the Blues ahead. Moses Odubajo capitalised on a long ball from his own half in the second period and deftly chipped the Birmingham keeper to level the score.

Fulham were Brentford's opponents in the second round of the League Cup and arrived at Griffin Park for the first time in 16 years on 26 August. Ross McCormack netted in the 68th minute to give Fulham the lead and the visitors maintained a solid defence to prevent the Bees from equalising, sending them out of the Cup. Having met the club's valuation, Wigan Athletic were given permission to speak to and agree terms with Adam Forshaw, whilst Jake Reeves had his contract terminated by mutual agreement leaving him free to sign for Swindon Town. Brentford ended August with a win away to Rotherham United. A first half injury time goal from Gray and a second half injury time goal from Proschwitz gave the Bees a 2–0 victory and moved the team up to 8th in the league table.

=== September ===
Adam Forshaw's move to Wigan Athletic was confirmed on transfer deadline day. Portuguese striker Betinho joined on a season long loan from Sporting Lisbon as Alfie Mawson extended his loan period with Wycombe Wanderers until the beginning of January 2015. Scott Hogan, who was carried off injured during the Rotherham match, was confirmed to have injured the anterior cruciate ligament in his left knee ruling him out for most of the season. Brentford gained their first home win of the campaign against Brighton following the 2 week International break. The Bees were 2–0 up with goals from Moses Odubajo and Andre Gray before Gordon Greer volleyed home to send the teams in 2–1 at the break. Jonathan Douglas scored in the 55th minute to put the home side three up, and although Danny Holla netted another for the Seagulls, Brentford held on for the win moving them up to 6th place in the league table.

A solid performance in goal from John Ruddy denied Brentford during the first half of their home encounter with Norwich City and the Bees were punished for their lack of shot conversion in the second half with goals from Alexander Tettey and Cameron Jerome giving the visitors a 3–0 victory. Following the match, Alan McCormack signed a new contract with the club, extending his stay until 2016 with an option of a further year. The losing momentum continued away to Middlesbrough with Brentford failing to find their rhythm and returning to London the wrong side of a 4–0 scoreline.

A missed penalty from James Tarkowski did not derail Brentford as they got back to winning ways with a victory over Leeds United at Griffin Park on 27 September. Jota scored his first goal in English football to put the team ahead and an opportunistic strike from Alan McCormack in the second half secured the points. Three days later at Vicarage Road a Jonathan Douglas goal levelled the score after the Bees had gone 1–0 down after Odion Ighalo scored from the rebound of his saved penalty. Brentford held on until the 70th minute but were defeated by an unstoppable volley from Matěj Vydra from just outside the penalty area, and they ended the month 12th place in the Championship table.

=== October ===
First half goals from Jota and Alex Pritchard and a third in the second half from Jonathan Douglas gave Brentford a winning start to October at home to Reading. Brentford's visit to Wigan saw the first meeting of the ex-management team of Rösler and Warburton. Despite chances from both sides, strong defensive performances kept the game goalless.

Harlee Dean returned to the starting line up in place of James Tarkowski as Brentford entertained Sheffield Wednesday at Griffin Park to celebrate 125 years since the club's formation. Brentford slipped to 12th place in league with the game ending in a second 0–0 draw. An unchanged line-up travelled to Bolton for the final game of October. An even first half finished goalless before Bolton broke the deadlock with an opener from Neil Danns. Alan McCormack was stretchered off and replaced by Tommy Smith before Mark Davies added a second for the home team. Substitute Jon Toral grabbed his first goal for the Bees but as the team sought an equaliser David Button was caught away from goal after moving upfield for a corner, and a quick move from Bolton allowed Craig Davies to net Bolton's third and secure the points.

It was confirmed on 31 October that Alan McCormack would be ruled out for three months due to the ankle ligament injury picked up during the Bolton match.

=== November ===
November began with the arrival of league leaders Derby County to Griffin Park. Moses Odubajo moved to defence to replace the injured Alan McCormack whilst Jon Toral was handed a starting place and Toumani Diagouraga replaced Alex Pritchard in midfield. Derby went ahead in the 29th minute through Chris Martin. A strong run from Odubajo in the second half set up Andre Gray for an equaliser and substitute Stuart Dallas scored the winner for Brentford in the 90th minute to knock Derby off the top of the table and move the Bees up to 12th. Brentford emerged 3–1 winners against Nottingham Forest at the City Ground four days later. Goals from Toral, Gray and Pritchard gave the Bees a 3–0 lead before Michail Antonio netted an consolation goal for the home side.

Brentford made the short trip across London on 8 November to play Millwall and with Jonathan Douglas suspended Jota returned to the starting line up. Gray scored either side of the interval to put the Bees two goals up before Millwall got back into the game with two goals in quick succession to level the score. Millwall persisted to try to find a winner until Danny Shittu deflected Gray's shot into his own net in the 64th minute to hand the win to the visitors.

Following the International break, Fulham arrived at Griffin Park for a Friday night televised match in front of a sell out crowd of 12,225. After a goalless first half, Fulham gained the lead against the run of play through Hugo Rodallega and continued to pressure for a second goal. Brentford sought an equaliser and were successful in the 81st minute when Harlee Dean unleashed a powerful shot from the edge of the penalty area to beat Marcus Bettinelli. The game seemed to be heading for a draw until Jota took an opportunistic shot that was deflected into the Fulham goal.

Brentford secured five wins in five games during an unbeaten November after a 4–0 home win against Wolverhampton Wanderers. Alan Judge scored his first of the season in the first half before Stuart Dallas, Andre Gray and Jota guaranteed the win with goals in the final 15 minutes. In recognition of the months achievement Andre Gray and Mark Warburton won Player of the Month and Manager of the Month respectively.

=== December ===
The first match of December was away to Huddersfield Town where Brentford's five match unbeaten run was brought to a halt. Sean Scannell put Huddersfield ahead in the 18th minute and they went further ahead with an own goal from Jake Bidwell at the start of the second half. Jonathan Douglas scored for Brentford soon after but the team were unable to come back and the defeat dropped them to 5th place in the league. A week later Brentford maintained 5th place with a win over Blackburn Rovers at Griffin Park. Goals from Douglas, Gray and Jota secured a 3–1 win, with Rudy Gestede scoring a consolation goal for the visitors via a deflection off Harlee Dean.

Three first half goals in a dominant half gave Brentford the advantage away to Cardiff City on 20 December. Alex Pritchard scored first with a strike from outside the penalty area and Gray added a second eleven minutes later with a deft chip over the Cardiff goalkeeper. Jota scored the third with an ambitious strike whilst surrounded by three defenders, but a rejuvenated Cardiff came out strong for the second half and despite scoring twice they could not overcome the deficit. The win moved Brentford into 3rd place in the league going into the Christmas period. Second played third as Ipswich Town arrived to Griffin Park on Boxing Day, and the visitors started strong with a goal in the first minute from Daryl Murphy. Murphy added a second twenty minutes later and Paul Anderson scored a third to give Ipswich the lead at half time. Second half substitute Sam Saunders marked his return from injury with two second half goals as Brentford attempted a comeback, but a fourth from former Brentford loanee Tommy Smith ensured that Ipswich wrapped up the win and briefly topped the Championship table.

Brentford finished 2014 with a defeat away to Wolves on 28 December. After going two goals down Danny Batth scored an own goal in the 86th minute to make the score 2–1 dropping the Bees to 6th place in the table as 2014 ended. The club announced the signing of Scottish International Lewis Macleod from Rangers on 31 December, with the transfer to be made official on 3 January 2015.

=== January ===
January began with the announcements that goalkeeper Richard Lee would be retiring at the end of the season and the contract extension of Jack Bonham. Brentford bowed out of the FA Cup with a home defeat to Brighton & Hove Albion, managed by ex-Bee Chris Hughton. First team regulars Jonathan Douglas, Tony Craig, and David Button were rested and Jack Bonham made his first start of the season in goal with James Tarkowski and Harlee Dean running the central defence. The Bees started strong with Andre Gray unlucky not to convert early chances but Brighton broke the deadlock in the 88th minute through a Lewis Dunk goal and confirmed the victory in injury time with Chris O'Grady exposing a gap in the Brentford defence, sending the Seagulls through to the fourth round.

Brentford ended their three-game losing streak with a win over Rotherham on 10 January. Stuart Dallas volleyed from outside the penalty area in the 57th minute to give Brentford the lead and Alex Pritchard hit the post soon after but no more goals were to come as Brentford remained in fifth place after the 1–0 win. Following the FA Cup defeat earlier in the month, Brentford arrived in Brighton in the league on 17 January seeking a victory. Dallas linked up with Jake Bidwell before treading through a cross which Andre Gray chipped over the opposing keeper to put the Bees ahead. Jon Toral had an opportunity towards the end of the game to add another but was unlucky not to score as again the Bees emerged 1–0 winners.

Everton forward Chris Long joined the club on an initial one-month loan on 20 January. Jota put Brentford ahead against Norwich in the 21st minute after a strong run from Moses Odubajo resulted in a pass to Gray who set up the Spaniard for his seventh goal of the season. Nathan Redmond equalised for Norwich six minutes later through a deflection of James Tarkowski, sending the teams in level at half time. In the second half Gray was brought down in the Norwich box and Alex Pritchard stepped up to convert the penalty giving the Bees the lead. A stunning double save from David Button prevented Norwich equalising and the resulting win moved Brentford up to 4th position in the league.

James Tarkowski had a first half shot cleared off the line and Stuart Dallas hit the post before David Button brought down Patrick Bamford and Grant Leadbitter converted the resulting penalty to give Middlesbrough the lead on an early televised game on 1 February. Dallas saw another shot go a fraction over the crossbar in the second half and Jonathan Douglas had a last minute chance saved on the line as the Bees tried and ultimately failed to turn their dominant possession into an equaliser.

=== February ===
Alex Pritchard had an on-target free kick saved in the first half before Toumani Diagouraga drove a low cross in front of the opposing goal for Pritchard to tap in during the second half against Leeds United. The 1–0 win moved Brentford up into 4th place in the league table. Jake Bidwell was dismissed in the first half three days later as the Bees entertained Watford at Griffin Park. Andre Gray put the home side up in the 52nd minute as he latched on to an upfield clearance from David Button to fire home. Button saved a penalty from Troy Deeney before being beaten twice by Odion Ighalo as Watford staged a late comeback to seal a 2–1 win. Despite having nearly two thirds of the possession, Brentford slipped to a second consecutive defeat away to Charlton Athletic at The Valley, as goals from Guðmundsson, Vetokele and Bulot gave The Addicks a 3–0 over the Bees.

League leaders Bournemouth arrived at Griffin Park on 21 February as Brentford sought to turn around their fortunes. An early goal from Jonathan Douglas put the Bees ahead until Marc Pugh equalised for the Cherries in the 30th minute. A long range free kick shot from Pritchard sailed past Artur Boruc just before half time and on-loan striker Chris Long scored his first for the club in the last minute of the match to give Brentford a 3–1 win which saw them consolidate 7th place in the league. Next up were bottom of the table Blackpool who Brentford comprehensively defeated 4–0 through a hat-trick from Jon Toral and a deflected strike from Andre Gray.

February ended with a defeat away at St Andrew's to Birmingham City. Paul Caddis drove in a low cross that ex-Bee Clayton Donaldson made a lunge for, but defending James Tarkowski connected with it, beating David Button and the resulting own goal was the only goal of the match the leaving the defeated Brentford in 7th position at the months end.

==== Managerial speculation and club statement ====
On 10 February Matt Smith reported in The Times the Brentford owner Matthew Benham planned to dismiss Mark Warburton at the end of the season regardless of where they finished in the league. He also reported that talks had been held with Rayo Vallecano coach Paco Jémez about the managers job. Brentford responded later in the day with an official statement that acknowledged the stories but stopped at denying them.

On 17 February the club released a follow-up statement confirming that Warburton, Assistant Manager David Weir and Sporting Director Frank McParland would be leaving the club at the end of the season.

Matthew and members of the Board have been in discussions with Manager Mark Warburton and other football staff about the future direction of the Club for many weeks, prior to stories appearing in the media last week.

As part of a remodelling of the Club's football management, a Head Coach will be appointed to work alongside a new Sporting Director. There will also be a new recruitment structure using a mixture of traditional scouting and other tools including mathematical modelling. As part of the new recruitment structure, the Head Coach will have a strong input in to the players brought in to the Club but not an absolute veto.

The club want the new structure to be a long-term way of working which is independent of whoever is in the Head Coach role.

Frank, Mark and David have decided, following long discussions with Matthew that they feel unable to work under the changed structure and approach as it differs from their football philosophy.

— Brentford FC Official Statement

=== March ===
March began with a home win against Huddersfield Town at Griffin Park which moved Brentford back into the play off positions. Chris Long scored twice and Alex Pritchard and Jon Toral got a goal each as the Bees secured a third consecutive home win. The following game away to promotion rivals Ipswich Town saw Brentford hold onto a 1–1 draw despite a series of late chances from the home team. Daryl Murphy put Mick McCarthy's men ahead early on before Jonathan Douglas capitalised on a clearance following a Stuart Dallas effort to level the score.

Brentford failed to take the advantage over 9-man Cardiff City on 14 March as they slipped to a 1–2 defeat. Ex-Bee Simon Moore parried Pritchard's free kick shot into the path of Andre Gray who scored his 13th league goal of the campaign, but two costly defensive errors gifted Cardiff opportunities which they swiftly converted to seal the win. The Bees came back from behind twice to win away to Blackburn Rovers at Ewood Park. Long netted before half time and Jota along with Gray added to the tally in the second half to give Brentford a 3–2 victory. Relegation threatened Millwall went two goals ahead at Griffin Park on 21 March in a bid to secure their place in the Championship, but Martyn Woolford brought down Alan Judge five minutes from time and Pritchard converted the resulting penalty. Moses Odubajo grabbed an equaliser for Brentford in the last minute to deny the Lions a win, but the draw couldn't prevent the Bees slipping to 7th place in the league.

=== April ===
Brentford got their promotion push back on track with a win over local rivals Fulham. 6,151 Brentford fans saw the Bees score four at Craven Cottage to complete a league double over the Cottagers with Stuart Dallas (2), Alan Judge and Jota scoring the goals. Three days later Nottingham Forest visited Griffin Park and after a goalless first half Tyler Walker put the away side ahead in the 61st minute. Todd Kane added a second but Brentford rallied and firstly Andre Gray and then Jota responded with goals in the last 10 minutes to level the score, with game finishing 2–2. Brentford visited Derby County on 11 April for a televised match. A dominant Brentford went ahead through Alex Pritchard in the 28th minute and held the upper hand until Darren Bent scored a late equaliser.

== Preseason ==
Win Draw Loss Postponed

=== Domestic friendlies ===
17 July 2014	Boreham Wood	1–3	Brentford	Meadow Park
19.30	Garrard 29' (pen.)	Report	O'Connor 20'; Hill 31' (o.g.); Bidwell 75'

22 July 2014	Barnet	1–5	Brentford	The Hive Stadium
19.45	MacDonald 9'	Report	Dallas 15'; Judge 37', 42'; Gray 58'; Moore 65'

26 July 2014	Brentford	3–2	(France) Nice	Griffin Park
15.00	Gray 2'; Pritchard 37', 43'	Report	Maupay 5'; Palun 45'	Attendance: 2,168

29 July 2014	Brentford	0–4	(Spain) Osasuna	Griffin Park
19:45 BST		Report	Manu Onwu 53', 58'; Nino 76'; Garcia 88'	Attendance: 2,805

2 August 2014	Brentford	3–2	Crystal Palace	Griffin Park
15.00	Douglas 48'; Gray 55'; Odubajo 75'	Report	Murray 56'; Chamakh 57'	Attendance: 3,624 (1,527 away fans)

== Championship ==
=== League results summary ===
Overall								Home						Away					
Pld	W	D	L	GF	GA	GD	Pts	W	D	L	GF	GA	GD	W	D	L	GF	GA	GD
46	23	9	14	78	59	+19	78	12	6	5	46	28	+18	11	3	9	32	31	+1

Last updated: 6 April 2015.
Source: Football League

=== Results and position by round ===
Round	1	2	3	4	5	6	7	8	9	10	11	12	13	14	15	16	17	18	19	20	21	22	23	24	25	26	27	28	29	30	31	32	33	34	35	36	37	38	39	40	41	42	43	44	45	46
Ground	H	A	A	H	A	H	H	A	H	A	H	A	H	A	H	A	A	H	H	A	H	A	H	A	H	A	A	H	A	H	A	H	H	A	H	A	H	A	H	A	H	A	A	H	A	H
Result	D	L	W	D	W	W	L	L	W	L	W	D	D	L	W	W	W	W	W	L	W	W	L	L	W	W	W	L	W	L	L	W	W	L	W	D	L	W	D	W	D	D	L	D	W	W
Position	12	19	12	15	8	6	10	14	11	12	10	10	12	13	12	9	6	5	3	5	5	3	5	6	5	5	4	5	4	6	7	7	7	7	6	6	6	6	7	5	7	7	7	7	7	5

Source: BFC
A = Away; H = Home; W = Win; D = Draw; L = Loss

=== League table ===
Pos	Team	Pld	W	D	L	GF	GA	GD	Pts	Promotion, qualification or relegation
3	Norwich City (O, P)	46	25	11	10	88	48	+40	86	Qualification for Championship play-offs
4	Middlesbrough	46	25	10	11	68	37	+31	85	Qualification for Championship play-offs
5	Brentford	46	23	9	14	78	59	+19	78	Qualification for Championship play-offs
6	Ipswich Town	46	22	12	12	72	54	+18	78	Qualification for Championship play-offs
7	Wolverhampton Wanderers	46	22	12	12	70	56	+14	78	

Updated to match(es) played on 2 May 2015. Source: Sky Sports
Rules for classification: 1) Points; 2) Goal difference; 3) Number of goals scored
(O) Play-off winners; (P) Promoted

=== Matches ===
Win Draw Loss Postponed

==== August ====
9 August 2014 1	Brentford	1–1	Charlton Athletic	Griffin Park, Brentford, London
15:00	Smith 85'	Reports; BBC; CAFC; BFC; Highlights on YouTube	Vetokele 64'	Attendance: 9,690; Referee: James Adcock

16 August 2014 2	Bournemouth	1–0	Brentford	Dean Court
15:00	Stanislas 72'	Reports; BBC; BFC; AFCB; Highlights on YouTube		Attendance: 10,114 (1,392 away fans); Referee: Gavin Ward

19 August 2014 3	Blackpool	1–2	Brentford	Bloomfield Road, Blackpool
19:45	Delfouneso 17'	Reports; BBC; BFC; BFC; Highlights on YouTube	Pritchard 37'; Dallas 52'	Attendance: 9,939 (472 away fans); Referee: Mark Haywood

23 August 2014 4	Brentford	1–1	Birmingham City	Griffin Park, Brentford, London
15:00	Craig (red card) 16'; Odubajo 79'	Reports; BBC; BFC; BCFC; Highlights on YouTube	Caddis 17' (pen.)	Attendance: 9,076; Referee: Robert Madley

30 August 2014 5	Rotherham United	0–2	Brentford	New York Stadium, Rotherham
15:00		Reports; BBC; BFC; RUFC; Highlights on YouTube	Gray 45'; Proschwitz 90'	Attendance: 9,016 (611 away fans); Referee: Stuart Attwell

==== September ====
13 September 2014 6	Brentford	3–2	Brighton & Hove Albion	Griffin Park, Brentford, London
15:00	Odubajo 18'; Gray 32'; Douglas 55'	Reports; BBC; BFC; BHAFC; Highlights on YouTube	Greer 39'; Holla 61'	Attendance: 10,089; Referee: Steve Martin

16 September 2014 7	Brentford	0–3	Norwich City	Griffin Park, Brentford, London
19:45		Reports; BBC; BFC; NCFC; Highlights on YouTube	Redmond 67'; Jerome 74', 82'	Attendance: 10,074; Referee: Tim Robinson

20 September 2014 8	Middlesbrough	4–0	Brentford	Riverside Stadium, Middlesbrough
15:00	Leadbitter 35'; Adomah 50'; Bamford 68'; Kike 89'	Reports; BBC; BFC; MFC; Highlights on YouTube		Attendance: 15,484 (567 away fans); Referee: Jeremy Simpson

27 September 2014 9	Brentford	2–0	Leeds United	Griffin Park, Brentford, London
15:00	Jota 45'; McCormack 77'	Reports; BBC; BFC; LUFC; Highlights on YouTube		Attendance: 10,886; Referee: Dean Whitehead

30 September 2014 10	Watford	2–1	Brentford	Vicarage Road, Watford
19:45	Ighalo 43'; Vydra 70'; Pudil (red card) 90+2'	Reports; BBC; BFC; WFC; Highlights on YouTube	Douglas 57'	Attendance: 15,502 (1,931 away fans); Referee: Graham Salisbury

==== October ====
4 October 2014 11	Brentford	3–1	Reading	Griffin Park, Brentford, London
15:00	Jota 11'; Pritchard 32'; Douglas 81'	Reports; BBC; BFC; RFC; Highlights on YouTube	Cox 49'	Attendance: 10,776; Referee: Roger East

18 October 2014 12	Wigan Athletic	0–0	Brentford	DW Stadium, Wigan
15:00		Reports; BBC; BFC; WAFC; Highlights on YouTube		Attendance: 12,061 (1,149 away fans); Referee: Tony Harrington

21 October 2014 13	Brentford	0–0	Sheffield Wednesday	Griffin Park, Brentford, London
19:45		Reports; BBC; BFC; SWFC; Highlights on YouTube		Attendance: 10,826; Referee: Oliver Langford

25 October 2014 14	Bolton Wanderers	3–1	Brentford	Macron Stadium, Bolton
15:00	Danns 61'; M. Davies 76'; C. Davies 90+6'	Reports; BBC; BFC; BWFC; Highlights on YouTube	Toral 83'	Attendance: 14,811 (844 away fans); Referee: Mark Heywood

==== November ====
1 November 2014 15	Brentford	2–1	Derby County	Griffin Park, Brentford, London
15:00	Gray 49'; Dallas 90'	Reports; BBC; BFC; DCFC; Highlights on YouTube	Martin 27'	Attendance: 10,608; Referee: Carl Berry

5 November 2014 16	Nottingham Forest	1–3	Brentford	The City Ground, Nottingham
19:45	Antonio 82'	Reports; BBC; BFC; Highlights on YouTube	Toral 17'; Gray 35'; Pritchard 48' (pen.)	Attendance: Mark Haywood; Referee: 21,072

8 November 2014 17	Millwall	2–3	Brentford	The Den, South Bermondsey, London
15:00	Gregory 58'; Dunne 59'	Reports; BBC; BFC; Highlights on YouTube	Gray 42', 56'; Shittu 64' (o.g.)	Attendance: 13,048 (1,771 away fans); Referee: James Adcock

21 November 2014 18	Brentford	2–1	Fulham	Griffin Park, Brentford, London
19:45	Dean 81'; Jota 90+1'	Reports; BBC; BFC; FFC; Highlights on YouTube	Rodallega 57'	Attendance: 12,255; Referee: David Coote

29 November 2014 19	Brentford	4–0	Wolverhampton Wanderers	Griffin Park, Brentford, London
15:00	Judge 29'; Dallas 74'; Gray 82'; Jota 90'	Reports; BBC; BFC; WWFC; Highlights on YouTube		Attendance: 10,923; Referee: Mark Brown

==== December ====
6 December 2014 20	Huddersfield Town	2–1	Brentford	Kirklees Stadium, Huddersfield
15:00	Scannell 18'; Bidwell 48' (o.g.)	Reports; BBC; BFC; HTAFC; Highlights on YouTube	Douglas 70'	Attendance: 13,038; Referee: Eddie Illerton

13 December 2014 21	Brentford	3–1	Blackburn Rovers	Griffin Park, Brentford, London
15:00	Douglas 16'; Gray 55'; Jota 61'	Reports; BBC; BFC; BRFC; Highlights on YouTube	Gestede 45'	Attendance: 11,848; Referee: Andy Woolmer

20 December 2014 22	Cardiff City	2–3	Brentford	Cardiff City Stadium, Cardiff
15:00	Noone 48'; Jones 75'	Reports; BBC; BFC; CCFC; Highlights on YouTube	Pritchard 11'; Gray 22'; Jota 33'	Attendance: 21,784; Referee: Graham Scott

26 December 2014 23	Brentford	2–4	Ipswich Town	Griffin Park, Brentford, London
13:00	Saunders 80', 90'	Reports; BBC; BFC; ITFC; Highlights on YouTube	Murphy 1', 21'; Anderson 30'; Smith 82'	Attendance: 12,165; Referee: Fred Graham

28 December 2014 24	Wolverhampton Wanderers	2–1	Brentford	Molineux Stadium, Wolverhampton
15:00	Dicko 7'; Tarkowski 73' (o.g.)	Reports; BBC; BFC; WWFC; Highlights on YouTube	Batth 87' (o.g.)	Attendance: 23,598; Referee: Kevin Wright

==== January ====
10 January 2015 25	Brentford	1–0	Rotherham United	Griffin Park, Brentford, London
15:00	Dallas 57'	Reports; BBC; BFC; RUFC; Highlights on YouTube		Attendance: 10,851; Referee: Paul Tierney

17 January 2015 26	Brighton & Hove Albion	0–1	Brentford	Falmer Stadium, Brighton
15:00		Reports; BBC; BFC; BHAFC; Highlights on YouTube	Gray 29'	Attendance: 27,186; Referee: Andy Davies

24 January 2015 27	Norwich City	1–2	Brentford	Carrow Road, Norwich
15:00	Redmond 27'	Reports; BBC; BFC; NCFC; Highlights on YouTube	Jota 21'; Pritchard 71' (pen.)	Attendance: 26,148; Referee: Nigel Miller

31 January 2015 28	Brentford	0–1	Middlesbrough	Griffin Park, Brentford, London
12:15		Reports; BBC; BFC; MFC; Highlights on YouTube	Leadbitter 44' (pen.)	Attendance: 11,853; Referee: Simon Hooper

==== February ====
7 February 2015 29	Leeds United	0–1	Brentford	Elland Road, Leeds
15:00		Reports; BBC; BFC; LUFC; Highlights on YouTube	Pritchard 65'	Attendance: 23,164; Referee: Graham Salisbury

10 February 2015 30	Brentford	1–2	Watford	Griffin Park, Brentford, London
19:45	Bidwell (red card) 37'; Gray 53'	Reports; BBC; BFC; WFC; Highlights on YouTube	Ighalo 68', 90'	Attendance: 10.524; Referee: Keith Stroud

14 February 2015 31	Charlton Athletic	3–0	Brentford	The Valley, Charlton, London
15:00	Guðmundsson 27'; Vetokele 55'; Bulot 90+1'	Reports; BBC; BFC; CAFC; Highlights on YouTube		Attendance: 14,875; Referee: Graham Scott

21 February 2015 32	Brentford	3–1	Bournemouth	Griffin Park, Brentford, London
15:00	Douglas 9'; Pritchard 45'; Long 90'	Reports; BBC; BFC; AFCB; Highlights on YouTube	Pugh 30'	Attendance: 11,459; Referee: Mike Dean

24 February 2015 33	Brentford	4–0	Blackpool	Griffin Park, Brentford, London
19:45	Toral 16', 18', 89'; Gray 52'	Reports; BBC; BFC; BFC; Highlights on YouTube		Attendance: 8,765; Referee: Andy D'Urso

28 February 2015 34	Birmingham City	1–0	Brentford	St Andrew's, Birmingham
15:00	Tarkowski 40' (o.g.)	Reports; BBC; BFC; BCFC; Highlights on YouTube		Attendance: 15,333; Referee: Darren Bond

==== March ====
3 March 2015 35	Brentford	4–1	Huddersfield Town	Griffin Park, Brentford, London
19:45	Long 4', 51'; Pritchard 70'; Toral 90+3'	Reports; BBC; BFC; HTFC; Highlights on YouTube	Bunn 22'	Attendance: 9,624; Referee: Chris Kavanagh

7 March 2015 36	Ipswich Town	1–1	Brentford	Portman Road, Ipswich
15:00	Murphy 9'	Reports; BBC; BFC; ITFC; Highlights on YouTube	Douglas 25'	Attendance: 20,132; Referee: Scott Duncan

14 March 2015 37	Brentford	1–2	Cardiff City	Griffin Park, Brentford, London
15:00	Gray 28'	Reports BFC; CCFC; Highlights on YouTube	Macheda 53'; Revell 68'	Attendance: 11,217; Referee: Andrew Davies

17 March 2015 38	Blackburn Rovers	2–3	Brentford	Ewood Park, Blackburn
19:45	Gestede 5'; Taylor 45+3'	Reports; BBC; BFC; BRFC; Highlights on YouTube	Long 44'; Jota 52'; Gray 84'	Attendance: 13,382; Referee: Seb Stockbridge

21 March 2015 39	Brentford	2–2	Millwall	Griffin Park, Brentford, London
13:00	Bidwell 85' (pen.); Odubajo 90+1'	Reports; BBC; BFC; MFC; Highlights on YouTube	Gregory 29'; O'Brien 64'	Attendance: 10,179; Referee: Fred Graham

==== April ====
3 April 2015 40	Fulham	1–4	Brentford	Craven Cottage, Fulham, London
15:00	McCormack 67' (pen.)	Reports; BBC; BFC; FFC; Highlights on YouTube	Dallas 24', 58'; Judge 90'; Jota 90'	Attendance: 23,271; Referee: Simon Hopper

6 April 2015 41	Brentford	2–2	Nottingham Forest	Griffin Park, Brentford, London
15:00	Gray 80'; Jota 90'	Reports; BBC; BFC; NFFC; Highlights on YouTube	Walker 61'; Kane 77'	Attendance: 11,499; Referee: David Webb

11 April 2015 42	Derby County	1–1	Brentford	Pride Park Stadium, Derby
12:15	Bent 90'	Reports; BBC; BFC; DCFC; Highlights on YouTube	Pritchard 28'	Attendance: 30,043; Referee: Graham Scott

14 April 2015 43	Sheffield Wednesday	1–0	Brentford	Hillsborough Stadium, Sheffield
19:45	Lee 75'	Reports; BBC; BFC; SWFC; Highlights on YouTube		Attendance: 17,416; Referee: Mark Brown

18 April 2015 44	Brentford	2–2	Bolton Wanderers	Griffin Park, Brentford, London
15:00	Pritchard 35'; Douglas 42'	Reports; BBC; BFC; BWFC; Highlights on YouTube	Le Fondre 39'; M. Davies 71'	Attendance: 11,874; Referee: Carl Boyeson

25 April 2015 45	Reading	0–2	Brentford	Madejski Stadium, Reading
15:00		Reports; BBC; BFC; RFC; Highlights on YouTube	Judge 7'; Tarkowski 65'	Attendance: 20,048; Referee: Andy Madley

==== May ====
2 May 2015 46	Brentford	3–0	Wigan Athletic	Griffin Park, Brentford, London
12:15	Pritchard 35'; Jota 46'; Gray 80'	Reports; BBC; BFC; WAFC; Highlights on YouTube		Attendance: 11,842; Referee: Andy Woolmer

==== Play-Offs ====
8 May 2015 Play Off Semi-finals, 1st Leg	Brentford	1–2	Middlesbrough	Griffin Park, Brentford, London
19:45	Gray 54'	Reports; BBC; BFC; MFC; Highlights on YouTube	Vossen 26'; Amorebieta 90'	Attendance: 11,691; Referee: Jonathon Moss

15 May 2015 Play Off Semi-finals, 2nd Leg	Middlesbrough	3–0	Brentford	Riverside Stadium, Middlesbrough
19:45	Tomlin 23'; Kike 55'; Adomah 78'	BBC; BFC; MFC; Highlights on YouTube		Attendance: 33,266; Referee: Lee Mason

=== Score overview ===
Opposition	Home score	Away score	Double
Birmingham City	1–1	0–1	No
Blackburn Rovers	3–1	3–2	Yes
Blackpool	4–0	2–1	Yes
Bolton Wanderers	2–2	1–3	No
Bournemouth	3–1	0–1	No
Brighton & Hove Albion	3–2	1–0	Yes
Cardiff City	1–2	3–2	No
Charlton Athletic	1–1	0–3	No
Derby County	2–1	1–1	No
Fulham	2–1	4–1	Yes
Huddersfield Town	4–1	1–2	No
Ipswich Town	2–4	1–1	No
Leeds United	2–0	1–0	Yes
Middlesbrough	0–1	0–4	No
Millwall	3–2	2–2	No
Norwich City	0–3	2–1	No
Nottingham Forest	2–2	3–1	No
Reading	3–1	2–0	Yes
Rotherham United	1–0	2–0	Yes
Sheffield Wednesday	0–0	0–1	No
Watford	1–2	1–2	No
Wigan Athletic	3–0	0–0	No
Wolverhampton Wanderers	4–0	1–2	No

== FA Cup ==
=== Matches ===
Win Draw Loss Postponed

3 January 2015 1st Round	Brentford	0–2	Brighton & Hove Albion	Griffin Park, Brentford, London
		BBC; BFC; BHAFC	Dunk 88'; O'Grady 90'	Attendance: 8,542; Referee: David Coote

== League Cup ==
=== Matches ===
Win Draw Loss Postponed

12 August 2014 1st Round	Dagenham & Redbridge	6–6 (a.e.t.) (2–4 p)	Brentford	Victoria Road, Dagenham
19:45	Porter 17'; Chambers 45+2'; Boucaud 55'; Hemmings 90' 113'; Cureton 100'	Reports; BFC; D&RFC; Soccerway; Highlights on YouTube	Dallas 5' 9'; Proschwitz 32'; Gray 83'; Moore 97'; Dean 117'	Attendance: 1,576; Referee: Hill
	Penalties
	Connors (penalty missed); Howell (penalty scored); Partridge (penalty scored); Chambers (penalty missed)		Dallas (penalty scored); Judge (penalty scored); Craig (penalty scored); O'Connor (penalty scored)

26 August 2014 2nd Round	Brentford	0–1	Fulham	Griffin Park, Brentford
19:45		Reports; BFC; FFC; BBC; Highlights on YouTube	McCormack 68'	Attendance: 7,563 (1,564 away fans); Referee: Duncan

== First-team squad ==
Players' ages are as of the opening day of the 2014–15 season.

Squad No.	Name	Nationality	Position	Date of birth (age)	Signed from	Signed in	Notes
Goalkeepers
1	Richard Lee	(England)	GK	5 October 1982 (aged 31)	Watford	2010	Loaned to Fulham
16	Jack Bonham	(Republic of Ireland)	GK	14 September 1993 (aged 20)	Watford	2013	
27	David Button	(England)	GK	27 February 1989 (aged 25)	Charlton Athletic	2013	
Defenders
2	Kevin O'Connor (captain)	(Republic of Ireland)	CM / AM / RW / RB / CB	24 February 1982 (aged 32)	Youth	1999	
3	Jake Bidwell	(England)	LB / LW	21 March 1991 (aged 23)	Everton	2013	
5	Tony Craig	(England)	LB / CB	20 April 1985 (aged 29)	Millwall	2012	
6	Harlee Dean	(England)	CB	26 July 1991 (aged 23)	Southampton	2012	
12	Alan McCormack	(Republic of Ireland)	RB / CM / CB	10 January 1984 (aged 30)	Swindon Town	2013	
25	Raphaël Calvet	(France)	CB	7 February 1994 (aged 20)	AJ Auxerre	2013	
26	James Tarkowski	(England)	CB	19 November 1992 (aged 21)	Oldham Athletic	2014	
28	Nico Yennaris	(China)	RB / CM	24 May 1993 (aged 21)	Arsenal	2014	Loaned to Wycombe Wanderers
32	Jack O'Connell	(England)	LB / CB	29 March 1994 (aged 20)	Blackburn Rovers	2015	Loaned to Rochdale
34	Daniel O'Shaughnessy	(Finland)	LB / CB	14 September 1994 (aged 19)	FC Metz	2014	
Midfielders
4	Lewis Macleod	(Scotland)	CM	16 June 1994 (aged 20)	Rangers	2015	
7	Sam Saunders	(England)	AM	29 August 1983 (aged 30)	Dagenham & Redbridge	2009	Loaned to Wycombe Wanderers
8	Jonathan Douglas	(Republic of Ireland)	DM	12 November 1981 (aged 32)	Swindon Town	2011	
10	Moses Odubajo	(England)	RW / RB	28 July 1993 (aged 21)	Leyton Orient	2014	
14	Marcos Tébar	(Spain)	AM	7 February 1986 (aged 28)	UD Almería	2014	
15	Stuart Dallas	(Northern Ireland)	AM	19 April 1991 (aged 23)	Crusaders	2012	
17	Jon Toral	(Spain)	LW / CM	5 February 1995 (aged 19)	Arsenal	2014	On loan from Arsenal
18	Alan Judge	(Republic of Ireland)	AM	11 November 1988 (aged 25)	Blackburn Rovers	2014	
20	Toumani Diagouraga	(France)	CM	9 June 1987 (aged 27)	Peterborough United	2010	
21	Alex Pritchard	(England)	AM	3 May 1993 (aged 21)	Tottenham Hotspur	2014	On loan from Tottenham Hotspur
23	Jota	(Spain)	AM	16 June 1991 (aged 23)	Celta de Vigo	2014	
30	Josh Clarke	(England)	RW / RB	5 July 1994 (aged 20)	Youth	2014	Loaned to Dagenham & Redbridge and Stevenage
35	Jermaine Udumaga	(England)	AM	22 June 1995 (aged 19)	Crystal Palace	2014	
Forwards
9	Scott Hogan	(Republic of Ireland)	ST	13 April 1992 (aged 22)	Rochdale	2014	
19	Andre Gray	(Jamaica)	ST	26 June 1991 (aged 23)	Luton Town	2014	
22	Betinho	(Portugal)	ST	21 July 1993 (aged 21)	Sporting CP	2014	On loan from Sporting CP
24	Tommy Smith	(England)	ST	22 May 1980 (aged 34)	Cardiff City	2014	
33	Montell Moore	(England)	ST	23 December 1995 (aged 18)	Youth	2012	Loaned to Midtjylland
39	Nick Proschwitz	(Germany)	ST	28 November 1986 (aged 27)	Hull City	2014	Loaned to Coventry City
Players who left the club mid-season
~~4~~	Adam Forshaw	(England)	CM	8 October 1991 (aged 22)	Everton	2012	Transferred to Wigan Athletic
~~22~~	Jake Reeves	(England)	CM	30 May 1993 (aged 21)	Youth	2011	Released
~~29~~	Charlie Adams	(England)	LW / CM	16 May 1994 (aged 20)	Youth	2011	Loaned to Stevenage, transferred to Louisville City
29	Liam Moore	(Jamaica)	RB / CB	31 January 1993 (aged 21)	Leicester City	2015	Returned to Leicester City after loan
31	Chris Long	(England)	ST	25 February 1995 (aged 19)	Everton	2015	On loan from Everton

Source: soccerbase.com

== Coaching staff ==
Last updated 2 June 2014

Name	Role
(England) Mark Warburton	Manager
(Scotland) David Weir	Assistant manager
(England) Frank McParland	Sporting director
(England) Simon Royce	Goalkeeping coach
(England) Ben Wood	Physiotherapist
(England) Neil Greig	Head of Medical
(England) Bob Oteng	Kit Man

== Statistics ==
=== Appearances and goals ===
Last Updated 15 May 2015

No.	Pos	Nat	Player	Total		Championship		FA Cup		League Cup		Play Offs	
No.	Pos	Nat	Player	Apps	Goals	Apps	Goals	Apps	Goals	Apps	Goals	Apps	Goals
1	GK	(England) ENG	Richard Lee	1	0	0+0	0	0+0	0	1+0	0	0+0	0
2	DF	(Ireland) EIR	Kevin O'Connor	1	0	0+0	0	0+0	0	1+0	0	0+0	0
3	DF	(England) ENG	Jake Bidwell	48	1	42+1	1	1+0	0	1+1	0	2+0	0
4	MF	(Scotland) SCO	Lewis Macleod	0	0	0+0	0	0+0	0	0+0	0	0+0	0
5	DF	(England) ENG	Tony Craig	24	0	22+1	0	0+0	0	1+0	0	0+0	0
6	DF	(England) ENG	Harlee Dean	40	2	33+2	1	1+0	0	2+0	1	2+0	0
7	MF	(England) ENG	Sam Saunders	6	2	0+5	2	0+1	0	0+0	0	0+0	0
8	MF	(Ireland) EIR	Jonathan Douglas	46	8	44+0	8	0+0	0	0+0	0	2+0	0
9	FW	(Republic of Ireland) IRL	Scott Hogan	2	0	0+1	0	0+0	0	0+1	0	0+0	0
10	MF	(England) ENG	Moses Odubajo	49	3	44+1	3	1+0	0	1+0	0	2+0	0
11	FW	(Northern Ireland) NIR	Will Grigg	0	0	0+0	0	0+0	0	0+0	0	0+0	0
12	MF	(Ireland) EIR	Alan McCormack	18	1	14+4	1	0+0	0	0+0	0	0+0	0
14	MF	(Spain) ESP	Marcos Tébar	6	0	1+3	0	0+0	0	2+0	0	0+0	0
15	MF	(Northern Ireland) NIR	Stuart Dallas	43	8	24+14	6	0+1	0	2+0	2	0+2	0
16	GK	(Ireland) EIR	Jack Bonham	1	0	0+0	0	1+0	0	0+0	0	0+0	0
18	FW	(Ireland) EIR	Alan Judge	41	3	33+4	3	1+0	0	0+1	0	2+0	0
19	FW	(England) ENG	Andre Gray	50	17	44+1	16	1+0	0	0+2	1	2+0	0
20	MF	(France) FRA	Toumani Diagouraga	44	0	32+7	0	1+0	0	1+1	0	2+0	0
22	FW	(Portugal) POR	Betinho	1	0	0+1	0	0+0	0	0+0	0	0+0	0
23	MF	(Spain) ESP	Jota	46	11	37+5	11	1+0	0	1+0	0	2+0	0
24	FW	(England) ENG	Tommy Smith	32	1	2+26	1	1+0	0	2+0	0	0+1	0
26	DF	(England) ENG	James Tarkowski	37	1	33+0	1	1+0	0	1+0	0	2+0	0
27	GK	(England) ENG	David Button	49	0	46+0	0	0+0	0	1+0	0	2+0	0
28	MF	(China) CHN	Nico Yennaris	3	0	1+0	0	0+1	0	1+0	0	0+0	0
29	MF	(England) ENG	Charlie Adams	0	0	0+0	0	0+0	0	0+0	0	0+0	0
32	DF	(England) ENG	Jack O'Connell	0	0	0+0	0	0+0	0	0+0	0	0+0	0
33	FW	(England) ENG	Montell Moore	1	1	0+0	0	0+0	0	1+0	1	0+0	0
34	DF	(Finland) FIN	Daniel O'Shaughnessy	0	0	0+0	0	0+0	0	0+0	0	0+0	0
39	FW	(Germany) GER	Nick Proschwitz	19	2	1+16	1	0+0	0	2+0	1	0+0	0
Players featured for Brentford on loan this season:
17	MF	(Spain) ESP	Jon Toral	37	6	8+26	6	1+0	0	1+0	0	0+1	0
21	MF	(England) ENG	Alex Pritchard	47	11	43+2	11	0+0	0	0+0	0	2+0	0
29	DF	(England) ENG	Liam Moore	4	0	4+0	0	0+0	0	0+0	0	0+0	0
31	FW	(England) ENG	Chris Long	11	4	2+8	4	0+0	0	0+0	0	0+1	0

Source: brentfordfc.co.uk
Italic: denotes player is no longer with team

=== Goalscorers ===
Last Updated 15 May 2015

No.	Pos	Player	FLC	FAC	LC	PO	Total
19	FW	Andre Gray	16	0	1	1	18
21	MF	Alex Pritchard	13	0	0	0	13
23	MF	Jota	10	0	0	0	10
15	MF	Stuart Dallas	6	0	2	0	8
8	MF	Jonathan Douglas	8	0	0	0	8
17	MF	Jon Toral	6	0	0	0	6
31	FW	Chris Long	4	0	0	0	4
10	MF	Moses Odubajo	3	0	0	0	3
18	MF	Alan Judge	3	0	0	0	3
8	MF	Sam Saunders	2	0	0	0	2
6	DF	Harlee Dean	1	0	1	0	2
39	FW	Nick Proschwitz	1	0	1	0	2
24	FW	Tommy Smith	1	0	0	0	1
12	DF	Alan McCormack	1	0	0	0	1
33	FW	Montell Moore	0	0	1	0	1
26	DF	James Tarkowski	1	0	0	0	1
		Own Goal	2	0	0	0	2
		Totals	77	0	6	1	86

Source: brentfordfc.co.uk
Italic: denotes player is no longer with team

=== Disciplinary record ===
Last Updated 15 May 2015

No.	Pos	Player	Yellow card	Red card
8	MF	Jonathan Douglas	10	0
18	MF	Alan Judge	9	0
26	DF	James Tarkowski	8	0
3	DF	Jake Bidwell	7	1
20	MF	Toumani Diagouraga	7	0
5	DF	Tony Craig	6	1
6	DF	Harlee Dean	6	0
27	GK	David Button	5	0
12	DF	Alan McCormack	4	0
10	MF	Moses Odubajo	4	0
15	MF	Stuart Dallas	3	0
17	MF	Jon Toral	2	0
23	MF	Jota	2	0
21	MF	Alex Pritchard	2	0
24	FW	Tommy Smith	2	0
14	MF	Marcos Tébar	1	0
19	FW	Andre Gray	1	0
39	FW	Nick Proschwitz	1	0
		Totals	79	2

Source: brentfordfc.co.uk
Italic: denotes player is no longer with team

=== Management ===
Last Updated 15 May 2015

Name	Nat	From	To	Record All Comps					Record League				
Name	Nat	From	To	P	W	D	L	W %	P	W	D	L	W %
Mark Warburton	(England)	10 December 2013	31 May 2015	51	24	9	18	47.06|	46	23	9	14	50.00

=== Summary ===
Last Updated 15 May 2015

Games played	51 (46 Championship, 1 FA Cup, 2 League Cup, 2 Play Offs)
Games won	24 (23 Championship, 0 FA Cup, 1 League Cup, 0 Play Offs)
Games drawn	9 (9 Championship, 0 FA Cup, 0 League Cup, 0 Play Offs)
Games lost	18 (14 Championship, 1 FA Cup, 1 League Cup, 2 Play Offs)
Goals scored	84 (77 Championship, 0 FA Cup, 6 League Cup, 1 Play Offs)
Goals conceded	73 (59 Championship, 2 FA Cup, 7 League Cup, 5 Play Offs)
Clean sheets	11 (11 Championship, 0 FA Cup, 0 League Cup)
Yellow cards	80 (73 Championship, 3 FA Cup, 1 League Cup, 4 Play Offs)
Red cards	2 (2 Championship, 0 FA Cup, 0 League Cup)
Worst discipline	(10 yellows) Jonathan Douglas
Biggest league win	4–0 (vs. Wolverhampton Wanderers & vs. Blackpool)
Worst league defeat	0–4 (vs. Middlesbrough)
Most appearances	49 Andre Gray (45 Championship, 1 FA Cup, 2 League Cup, 1 Play Offs)
Top scorer (league)	16 Andre Gray
Top scorer (all competitions)	18 Andre Gray
Hat Tricks	1 Jon Toral (vs. Blackpool)

== Transfers & loans ==
Players transferred in
Date	Pos.	Name	Previous club	Fee	Ref.
1 July 2014	FW	(Jamaica) Andre Gray	(England) Luton Town	£500,500	
1 July 2014	MF	(Republic of Ireland) Alan Judge	(England) Blackburn Rovers	Free	
1 July 2014	MF	(England) Moses Odubajo	(England) Leyton Orient	£1,000,000	
1 July 2014	GK	(England) Mark Smith	(England) Queens Park Rangers	Free	
1 July 2014	MF	(Spain) Marcos Tébar	(Spain) Almería	Free	
1 July 2014	MF	(England) Jermaine Udumaga	(England) Crystal Palace	Free	
21 July 2014	FW	(Republic of Ireland) Scott Hogan	(England) Rochdale	£650,000	
1 August 2014	DF	(Finland) Daniel O'Shaughnessy	(France) Metz	Free	
7 August 2014	FW	(Germany) Nick Proschwitz	(England) Hull City	Free	
7 August 2014	FW	(England) Tommy Smith	(Wales) Cardiff City	Free	
8 August 2014	DF	(England) Aaron Greene	(England) Chelmsford City	Free	
15 August 2014	MF	(Spain) Jota	(Spain) Celta de Vigo	Undisclosed	
1 January 2015	MF	(Scotland) Lewis Macleod	(Scotland) Rangers	Undisclosed	
5 January 2015	MF	(Northern Ireland) Jack Warburton	Unattached	Free	
14 January 2015	MF	(England) Josh Laurent	(England) Queens Park Rangers	Undisclosed	
2 February 2015	DF	(England) Jack O'Connell	(England) Blackburn Rovers	Undisclosed	
Players loaned in
Date from	Pos.	Name	From	Date to	Ref.
17 July 2014	MF	(England) Alex Pritchard	(England) Tottenham Hotspur	End of season	
15 August 2014	MF	(Spain) Jon Toral	(England) Arsenal	End of season	
1 September 2014	FW	(Portugal) Betinho	(Portugal) Sporting Lisbon	End of season	
20 January 2015	FW	(England) Chris Long	(England) Everton	19 April 2015	
26 February 2015	DF	(Jamaica) Liam Moore	(England) Leicester City	End of season	
Players transferred out
Date	Pos.	Name	Subsequent club	Fee	Ref
1 September 2014	MF	(England) Adam Forshaw	(England) Wigan Athletic	Undisclosed	
2 March 2015	MF	(England) Charlie Adams	(United States) Louisville City	Undisclosed	
Players loaned out
Date from	Pos.	Name	To	Date to	Ref.
18 July 2014	FW	(Northern Ireland) Will Grigg	(England) Milton Keynes Dons	End of season	
9 August 2014	DF	(England) Alfie Mawson	(England) Wycombe Wanderers	End of season	
22 August 2014	MF	(England) Josh Clarke	(England) Dagenham & Redbridge	23 September 2014	
16 October 2014	MF	(England) Emmanuel Oyeleke	(England) Aldershot Town	13 January 2015	
18 October 2014	MF	(England) Josh Clarke	(England) Stevenage	17 November 2014	
18 October 2014	MF	(England) Charlie Adams	(England) Stevenage	21 December 2014	
31 October 2014	GK	(England) Mark Smith	(England) Hampton & Richmond Borough	9 March 2015	
6 December 2014	DF	(England) Kieran Morris	(England) Stourbridge	9 February 2015	
9 January 2015	MF	(England) Gradi Milenge	(England) Farnborough	8 February 2015	
10 January 2015	FW	(England) Courtney Senior	(England) Wycombe Wanderers	11 February 2015	
19 January 2015	MF	(England) Montell Moore	(Denmark) Midtjylland	3 May 2015	
22 January 2015	MF	(England) Tyrell Miller-Rodney	(England) Boreham Wood	22 March 2015	
10 February 2015	DF	(England) Jack O'Connell	(England) Rochdale	29 March 2015	
27 February 2015	MF	(England) Sam Saunders	(England) Wycombe Wanderers	End of season	
27 February 2015	DF	(China) Nico Yennaris	(England) Wycombe Wanderers	End of season	
27 February 2015	FW	(Germany) Nick Proschwitz	(England) Coventry City	End of season	
10 March 2015	MF	(England) Louis Hutton	(England) Godalming Town	End of season	
21 March 2015	DF	(Scotland) Lionel Stone	(England) Woking	19 April 2015	
26 March 2015	GK	(England) Richard Lee	(England) Fulham	End of season	
26 March 2015	MF	(England) Emmanuel Oyeleke	(England) Woking	End of season	
Players released
Date	Pos.	Name	Subsequent club	Join date	Ref.
29 August 2014	MF	(England) Jake Reeves	(England) Swindon Town	29 August 2014	
30 June 2015	MF	(England) Louis Hutton	(England) Godalming Town	2015	
30 June 2015	GK	(England) Richard Lee	Retired		
30 June 2015	DF	(England) Joe Maloney	Retired		
30 June 2015	DF	(England) Alfie Mawson	(England) Barnsley	1 July 2015	
30 June 2015	MF	(England) Tyrell Miller-Rodney	(England) Hayes & Yeading United	14 August 2015	
30 June 2015	DF	(England) Kieran Morris	(England) Worcester City	24 July 2015	
30 June 2015	DF	(Republic of Ireland) Kevin O'Connor	Retired		
30 June 2015	MF	(England) Emmanuel Oyeleke	(England) Exeter City	1 July 2015	
30 June 2015	FW	(Germany) Nick Proschwitz	(Germany) SC Paderborn	1 July 2015	
30 June 2015	FW	(England) Tommy Smith	Retired		
30 June 2015	DF	(Scotland) Lionel Stone	(England) Waltham Forest	2015	
30 June 2015	MF	(Northern Ireland) Jack Warburton	Retired		

== Kit ==
The 2014–15 home kit was revealed on 2 June 2014 with a release date of 19 June 2014. adidas return as kit suppliers and SKYex continue their sponsorship for the third year.

Supplier: adidas
Sponsor(s): Skyex.co.uk

Home	Away	Goalkeeper	Alternate

Source: brentforddirect.co.uk

== Season events ==
- 2 June Alan Judge signs from Blackburn Rovers on a three-year deal for an undisclosed fee.
- 5 June Alfie Mawson signs a 12-month extension to his Development Squad contract.
- 6 June Joe Maloney extends his Development Squad contract by 12 months.
- 7 June Jermaine Udumaga joins the Development Squad from Oxford United.
- 9 June Josh Clarke signs a new one-year deal.
- 25 June Marcos Tébar joins from UD Almería on a two-year deal. Clayton Donaldson turns down a new contract with Brentford and agrees to join Birmingham City.
- 26 June Stuart Dallas signs a new three-year deal.
- 27 June Moses Odubajo joins from Leyton Orient and Andre Gray joins from Luton Town, both on three year deals for undisclosed fees. David Button signs a new three-year deal. Emmanuel Oyeleke signs a one-year Development Squad contract extension.
- 28 June Lionel Stone and Kieran Morris sign one year Development Squad contracts.
- 29 June Tyrell Miller Rodney signs a 12-month Development Squad Contract.
- 30 June Montell Moore signs a new one year Development Squad contract.
- 3 July Luke Norris turns down a new contract and joins Gillingam.
- 17 July Alex Pritchard joins on a season long loan from Tottenham.
- 18 July Will Grigg joins MK Dons on a season long loan.
- 21 July Scott Hogan signs from Rochdale, signing a three-year deal for an undisclosed fee.
- 24 July Jake Bidwell signs a new three-year deal.
- 1 August Manager Mark Warburton, Assistant Manager David Weir and Sporting Director Frank McParland sign one-year rolling contracts with the club. Daniel O'Shaughnessy joins from FC Metz on a two-year contract.
- 7 August Tommy Smith joins on a one-year deal. Nick Proschwitz joins on a one-year contract on a free transfer from Hully City.
- 8 August Development Squad Goalkeeper Mark Smith joins Hitchin Town on loan until 4 September.
- 9 August Alfie Mawson joins Wycombe on loan until 7 September. Aaron Green joins the Development Squad on a one-year deal.
- 15 August Jota signs on a three-year deal from Celta de Vigo. Jon Toral signs on a season long loan from Arsenal. Montell Moore signs a three-year deal.
- 22 August Josh Clarke joins Dagenham & Redbridge on loan until 18 September.
- 25 August Brentford accept an offer from Wigan Athletic for midfielder Adam Forshaw after their valuation terms are met.
- 29 August Jake Reeves has his contract terminated by mutual consent, and subsequently signs for Swindon Town.
- 1 September Adam Forshaw signs for Wigan Athletic. Betinho joins on a season long loan from Sporting Lisbon. Alfie Mawson's loan at Wycombe Wanderers is extended until 1 January 2015.
- 19 September Alan McCormack signs a new two-year contract with an option for a third year.
- 23 September Josh Clarke returns from his loan period at Dagenham & Redbridge.
- 31 October Alan McCormack is ruled out for 3 months with an ankle ligament injury.
- 11 November Tony Craig signs a new contract keeping him at the club until 2017.
- 9 December Toumani Diagouraga signs a new two-year contract expiring in 2017.
- 2 January Richard Lee announces that he will retire at the end of the season. Jack Bonham signs a new contract keeping him at the club until 2018.
- 3 January Alfie Mawson's loan at Wycombe is extended until the end of the season.
- 14 January Josh Laurent joins the Development squad from QPR.
- 15 January Sam Saunders signs a new deal keeping him at the club until 2016.
- 19 January Montell Moore joins FC Midtjylland on loan for the rest of the season.
- 20 January Chris Long signs on a months loan from Everton.
- 22 January Tyrell Miller-Rodney joins Boreham Wood on a two-month loan.
