= Montell Moore =

English footballer

Personal information
- Full name: Montell Brandon Kane Moore
- Date of birth: 23 December 1995 (age 30)
- Place of birth: Chiswick, England
- Position: Midfielder

Youth career
- 2003–2014: Brentford

Senior career*
Years	Team	Apps	(Gls)
2014–2016	Brentford	0	(0)
2014	→ Burnham (loan)	1	(0)
2015	→ Midtjylland (loan)	0	(0)
2016	Charlton Athletic	0	(0)
2017	Hibernians	11	(0)
2017	Enfield Town	6	(0)
Total		18	(0)
- * Club domestic league appearances and goals

Montell Brandon Kane Moore (born 23 December 1995) is an English convicted sex offender and former professional football midfielder. He is a product of the Brentford academy and had a spell with Maltese Premier League side Hibernians in 2017 after his departure from Charlton Athletic.

== Playing career ==
=== Brentford ===
==== Youth years (2003–2014) ====
Growing up in Chiswick, Moore joined the local Brentford Community Sports Trust at age seven and impressed enough to be offered a place at the club's Centre of Excellence. A broken leg and a year out of football failed to halt his progression through the ranks and he made his debut for the club's youth team during the 2011–12 season, making eight appearances. Moore signed scholarship forms in July 2012. Over the course of his two-year scholarship, he scored 14 goals in 36 appearances for the youth team and finished as top scorer in the 2013–14 season. On 30 June 2014, Moore signed a one-year professional contract to be a part of the Development Squad for the 2014–15 season.

==== Breakthrough (2014–2016) ====
After featuring for the first team during pre-season and scoring in a 5–1 rout of Barnet, Moore was called into the senior squad for the opening game of the 2014–15 Championship season against Charlton Athletic, but remained an unused substitute. He made his professional debut in the following match, starting in a League Cup first round tie with Dagenham & Redbridge. With the score at 4–4, Moore scored his first senior goal seven minutes into extra time and Brentford won the match on penalties after an incredible 6–6 draw. He also set up two goals for Stuart Dallas. Moore signed a new three-year contract on 15 August, but lost his place in the squad due to the arrival of Betinho on loan and the resurgence of Toumani Diagouraga. He continued to appear regularly for the Development Squad and spent the second half of the 2014–15 season out on loan.

Moore failed to feature at all for the first team during the first six months of the 2015–16 season and his contract was cancelled by mutual consent on 1 February 2016. He made one first team appearance and scored 9 goals in 31 matches for the Development Squad during 18 months as a professional at Griffin Park.

==== Burnham (loan) ====
Moore and Brentford Development Squad teammate George Pilbeam joined Southern League Premier Division strugglers Burnham on loan on 11 February 2014. In a spell affected by the weather, Moore made just one appearance for the Blues, as a late substitute in a 4–2 defeat to St Neots Town on 15 February.

==== Midtjylland (loan) ====
On 19 January 2015, Moore joined Danish Superliga leaders Midtjylland on loan until May 2015. He made 8 U19 and two reserve team appearances and helped the U19 team to the U19 Ligaen title. He returned to Griffin Park after his loan expired.

=== Charlton Athletic ===
On 15 February 2016, Moore joined Championship side Charlton Athletic until the end of the 2015–16 season after a successful trial with the club's Development Squad. He made one appearance for the club's U23 team in a Kent Senior Cup match.

=== Hibernians ===
In mid-January 2017, Moore moved to Malta to join Maltese Premier League club Hibernians. He made 11 appearances and won the first senior silverware of his career when Hibernians claimed the league title with one match to spare. He departed the club after the season.

=== Enfield Town ===
After receiving international clearance, Moore returned to England to join Isthmian League Premier Division club Enfield Town on 15 September 2017. He made his debut the following day as a late substitute for Mickey Parcell in a 0–0 FA Cup second qualifying round draw with Hanwell Town. He scored his first goal for the club in the following match, with the third goal in a 5–0 rout of Hanwell Town in the replay. Moore was released in November, after making 12 appearances and scoring two goals for the club.

== Sexual crimes and conviction ==
In September 2018, after having been found guilty of rape at Isleworth crown Court, he received a prison sentence of 11 years and 6 months.

On 18 April 2023, Moore pleaded guilty to two further counts of rape. He was sentenced to a further six years in prison. The initial offence took place in May 2014; a police spokesperson said "The victim decided to report the rape after hearing the offender had been convicted of a more recent offence." At the time of this conviction, he was serving his sentence at HMP Bristol.

== Honours ==
Hibernians

- Maltese Premier League: 2016–17

== Career statistics ==
As of match played 3 February 2018.

Club	Season	League			National Cup		League Cup		Other		Total	
Club	Season	Division	Apps	Goals	Apps	Goals	Apps	Goals	Apps	Goals	Apps	Goals
Brentford	2014–15	Championship	0	0	0	0	1	1	0	0	1	1
Burnham (loan)	2013–14	Southern League Premier Division	1	0	—		—		—		1	0
Hibernians	2016–17	Maltese Premier League	11	0	—		—		—		11	0
Enfield Town	2017–18	Isthmian League Premier Division	6	0	4	2	—		2 (Note: 1 appearance in FA Trophy, 1 appearance in Isthmian League Cup.)	0	12	2
Career total			18	0	4	2	1	1	2	0	25	3
