= Chris Long (footballer) =

English footballer (born 1995)

Personal information
- Full name: Christopher Michael Long
- Date of birth: 25 February 1995 (age 31)
- Place of birth: Huyton, England
- Height: 1.80 m (5 ft 11 in)
- Position: Forward

Youth career
- 2000–2013: Everton

Senior career*
Years	Team	Apps	(Gls)
2013–2015	Everton	0	(0)
2014	→ Milton Keynes Dons (loan)	4	(1)
2015	→ Brentford (loan)	10	(4)
2015–2018	Burnley	10	(0)
2016–2017	→ Fleetwood Town (loan)	18	(4)
2017	→ Bolton Wanderers (loan)	10	(1)
2017–2018	→ Northampton Town (loan)	38	(9)
2018	Fleetwood Town	8	(0)
2019	Blackpool	17	(2)
2019–2021	Motherwell	54	(11)
2021–2025	Crewe Alexandra	94	(28)
2025–2026	Brisbane Roar	17	(4)

International career^{‡}
2010–2011	England U16	2	(0)
2011	England U17	4	(2)
2012–2013	England U18	2	(1)
2013	England U19	1	(0)
2013–2014	England U20	5	(2)
- * Club domestic league appearances and goals as of 20 January 2026 ‡ National team caps and goals as of 21:51, 10 October 2014 (UTC)

Christopher Michael Long (born 25 February 1995) is an English professional footballer who most recently played as a forward for A-League club Brisbane Roar. He is a product of the Everton Academy. Long has represented England from U16 to U20 level.

== Club career ==
=== Everton ===
A forward, Long grew up in Huyton and represented the town at schoolboy level. Long joined the Everton academy as a five-year-old in 2000 and worked his way up through the youth ranks. He made his debut for the Toffees' youth team in a 2–1 Premier Academy League defeat to Bolton Wanderers on 5 February 2011, coming on as a late substitute for Hallam Hope. He broke into the youth team on a regular basis during the 2011–12 season, impressing with nine goals in 17 games. Long also made his reserve team debut during the season, scoring one goal in seven Premier Reserve League appearances. He signed a two-year professional contract in July 2013. After steady progress in the reserves and a goal for the first team in a 3–1 pre-season friendly defeat to Paderborn in August 2014, Long received his maiden call into the senior squad for Everton's dead rubber Europa League group stage match versus Krasnodar on 11 December. Awarded the number 41 shirt, he made his Everton debut when he came on for Conor McAleny after 80 minutes of the 1–0 defeat. Entering the final six months of his contract in January 2015, Long stated that he hoped to earn a new deal with his performances on loan away from Goodison Park. He turned down a new deal after the 2014–15 season and departed Everton on 28 July 2015.

==== Milton Keynes Dons (loan) ====
On 8 January 2014, Long signed for League One side Milton Keynes Dons on a one-month loan. Allotted the number 15 shirt, Long made the first professional appearance of his career in a 3–2 win over Shrewsbury Town three days later, starting the match and scoring his first senior goal to put the Dons 2–1 ahead. He played the full 90 minutes of the following match versus Bristol City and managed two further starts before returning to Everton in February when his loan expired. Long scored one goal in four appearances for the Dons.

==== Brentford (loan) ====
Long followed in the footsteps of former Everton youth colleagues Jake Bidwell, Adam Forshaw and Conor McAleny by joining Championship side Brentford on 20 January 2015, on an initial one-month loan. Through later extensions, the loan was extended until the end of the 2014–15 season. Wearing the number 31 shirt, he made his debut four days later in a 2–1 victory over Norwich City, coming on as a late substitute for Andre Gray. He scored his first Bees goal on his fifth appearance, crowning a 3–1 victory over Bournemouth on 21 February. Selected ahead of Andre Gray, Long made his first Bees start versus Huddersfield Town on 3 March and scored two goals before being replaced by Gray after 73 minutes. He made it four goals in five games with Brentford's opener in a 3–2 victory over Blackburn Rovers two weeks later. A stomach bug, an injury and a gashed knee (the latter suffered in an Everton reserve match) kept Long out of the squad for the rest of the regular season. Long failed to appear again until what became Brentford's final game of the season, a 3–0 playoff semi-final second leg defeat to Middlesbrough on 15 May, replacing Toumani Diagouraga after 71 minutes. He made 11 appearances and scored four goals during his spell.

=== Burnley ===
On 28 July 2015, Long signed for newly relegated Championship side Burnley for an undisclosed fee. In May 2018, he was released by Burnley following the expiration of his contract after three years at the club.

==== Loan spells ====
On 12 August 2016, Long joined League One side Fleetwood Town on a season-long loan deal. On 30 January 2017, Long was recalled by Burnley and immediately loaned to another League One side Bolton Wanderers until the end of the season. He scored on his home debut for the club, coming on as a substitute in a 4–1 win against Walsall. On 28 July 2017, Long joined League One side Northampton Town on a season long loan deal.

=== Fleetwood Town ===
On 20 July 2018, Long signed for EFL League One side Fleetwood Town on a two-year deal.

=== Blackpool ===
On 8 January 2019, Long joined Blackpool until the end of the 2018–19 season after his contract at Fleetwood had been terminated by mutual consent.

=== Motherwell ===
On 10 June 2019, Motherwell announced the signing of Long on a one-year contract to begin when his Blackpool contract expired on 30 June 2019. He made his debut on 13 July 2019, in a Scottish League Cup group stage match away to Queen of the South, however he had to be substituted after only three minutes having been struck in the face by the ball within the first ten seconds of the match. Long netted his first hat-trick for the club in a 3–0 Scottish Cup win at Dundee on 18 January 2020.

On 10 July 2020 it was announced Long had signed a new one-year deal to stay at Motherwell.

He was released by the club at the end of the 2020–21 season.

=== Crewe Alexandra ===
Long joined League One club Crewe Alexandra on a two-year deal on 7 June 2021. He made his Crewe debut in a League Cup first round tie at Hartlepool United on 10 August 2021, but initially struggled to get further games due to COVID-19, Norovirus and a slight injury. He scored his first Crewe goal on 30 October 2021, against MK Dons at Gresty Road, but then suffered a groin injury in Crewe's next game. However, as Crewe were relegated to League Two, he became a first team regular, finished joint top scorer with 10 goals from 34 appearances, and was named Crewe Alexandra Player of the Season.

The start of Long's second season at Crewe was also hampered by injury and illness; Long suffered an ankle injury during pre-season then had a bout of food poisoning which delayed his return to the first team. He played one league game in September 2022 and was then out of the first team until April 2023. He then scored three goals in Crewe's final nine games of the season, against Barrow on 7 April, Walsall on 15 April, and Bradford City on 3 May. Long was offered a new contract by the club at the end of the season, and signed a 12-month deal. After his third season at the club, having helped it reach the League 2 play-off final in May 2024, Long was offered another new contract by Crewe and signed a one-year deal.

After scoring three times in four games at the start of the 2024–25 season, Long suffered a hamstring injury, ruling him out until November. He made a substitute appearance in Crewe's FA Cup first round defeat by Dagenham & Redbridge on 2 November 2024, and was then red-carded after less than two minutes of his second-half substitute appearance against Notts County on 16 November 2024. Making a first league start since his injury comeback, Long scored the opening goal in Crewe's 3–2 New Year's Day victory over Carlisle United.

On 14 May 2025, the club announced he would be leaving in June when his contract expired.

=== Brisbane Roar ===
On 24 July 2025, Brisbane Roar announced the signing of Long on a one-year deal with an option to extend for a further season. On 8 May 2026, it was announced that Long would depart the club upon the expiration of his contract after the club declined the option to extend his deal. He finished his debut A-League Men season with four goals in 17 appearances.

== International career ==
Long has represented England from U16 to U20 level. He made two appearances in the U16s' victorious 2010–11 Victory Shield campaign. Long was elevated an age-group and named in the England squad for the U20 World Cup in June 2013. He scored on his debut for the side in a 3–0 pre-tournament friendly victory over Uruguay. He made substitute appearances against Egypt and Iraq as England crashed out in the group stage. Long made his U19 debut in a friendly versus Hungary on 14 November 2013. Long scored his second U20 goal in a 3–2 Four Nations Tournament victory over the Netherlands on 11 October 2014.

== Career statistics ==
As of match played 3 May 2025

Appearances and goals by club, season and competition
Club	Season	League			FA Cup		League Cup		Other		Total	
Club	Season	Division	Apps	Goals	Apps	Goals	Apps	Goals	Apps	Goals	Apps	Goals
Everton	2013–14	Premier League	0	0	0	0	0	0	—		0	0
Everton	2014–15	Premier League	0	0	0	0	0	0	1 (Note: Appearances in UEFA Europa League)	0	1	0
Everton	Total		0	0	0	0	0	0	1	0	1	0
Milton Keynes Dons (loan)	2013–14	League One	4	1	0	0	0	0	0	0	4	1
Brentford (loan)	2014–15	Championship	10	4	0	0	0	0	1 (Note: Appearance in Championship play-offs)	0	11	4
Burnley	2015–16	Championship	10	0	1	0	0	0	—		11	0
Burnley	2016–17	Premier League	0	0	0	0	0	0	—		0	0
Burnley	2017–18	Premier League	0	0	0	0	0	0	—		0	0
Burnley	Total		10	0	1	0	0	0	0	0	11	0
Fleetwood Town (loan)	2016–17	League One	18	4	5	0	0	0	0	0	23	4
Bolton Wanderers (loan)	2016–17	League One	10	1	0	0	0	0	0	0	10	1
Northampton Town (loan)	2017–18	League One	38	9	1	0	1	0	3 (Note: Appearances in EFL Trophy)	0	43	9
Fleetwood Town	2018–19	League One	8	0	0	0	2	0	3	1	13	1
Blackpool	2018–19	League One	17	2	0	0	0	0	0	0	17	2
Motherwell	2019–20	Scottish Premiership	25	7	2	3	4	1	—		31	11
Motherwell	2020–21	Scottish Premiership	29	4	3	1	0	0	3	1	35	6
Motherwell	Total		54	11	5	4	4	1	3	1	66	17
Crewe Alexandra	2021–22	League One	32	10	0	0	1	0	1	0	34	10
Crewe Alexandra	2022–23	League Two	10	3	0	0	0	0	0	0	10	3
Crewe Alexandra	2023–24	League Two	27	9	0	0	2	0	3 (Note: Appearance in EFL play-offs)	0	32	9
Crewe Alexandra	2024–25	League Two	25	6	1	0	0	0	2	2	28	8
Crewe Alexandra	Total		94	28	1	0	3	0	7	2	105	30
Career total			246	54	13	4	10	1	15	4	284	63

== Honours ==
Burnley

- Football League Championship: 2015–16

Bolton Wanderers

- EFL League One runner-up: 2016–17

Individual

- Crewe Alexandra Player of the Season: 2021–22
