= Filip Marschall =

English footballer (born 2003)

Personal information
- Full name: Filip Marschall
- Date of birth: 24 April 2003 (age 23)
- Place of birth: Cambridge, England
- Height: 6 ft 5 in (1.95 m)
- Position: Goalkeeper

Team information
- Current team: Millwall

Youth career
- 2016–2018: Cambridge City
- 2018–2021: Aston Villa

Senior career*
Years	Team	Apps	(Gls)
2021–2025	Aston Villa	0	(0)
2022	→ Gateshead (loan)	19	(0)
2023	→ Gateshead (loan)	20	(0)
2024	→ Milton Keynes Dons (loan)	6	(0)
2024–2025	→ Crewe Alexandra (loan)	46	(0)
2025–2026	Stevenage	48	(0)
2026–	Millwall	4	(0)

International career
2021	England U19	2	(0)
- * Club domestic league appearances and goals as of 15:07, 2 November 2026 (UTC)

Filip Marschall (born 24 April 2003) is an English professional footballer who plays as a goalkeeper for EFL Championship club Millwall. He has represented England at U19 level.

Marschall joined the Academy at Aston Villa from Cambridge City in 2018. He won the FA Youth Cup in 2021 and had subsequent loan spells at Gateshead, Milton Keynes Dons and Crewe Alexandra. He helped Gateshead to win the National League North title in the 2021–22 campaign and was also an unused substitute in the 2023 FA Trophy final.

== Early and personal life ==
Filip Marschall was born on 24 April 2003 in Cambridge to Polish parents. He speaks English and Polish, as well as Spanish, which he studied at A-level.

== Club career ==
Marschall joined the Cambridge City academy as a child. Until he was 13, Marschall had never played in goal, playing as a defender.

=== Aston Villa ===
In January 2018, Marschall signed for EFL Championship club Aston Villa. Marschall was a regular starting goalkeeper for Villa's youth teams. In 2021, Marschall was part of the Villa team that won the FA Youth Cup. Later that season, he was awarded Aston Villa's Premier League Scholar of the Year. In July 2021, Marschall was given his first professional contract by Aston Villa. He was named in a first-team matchday squad for the first time on 14 December 2021, when he was an unused substitute in a Premier League match at Norwich City.

On 31 January 2022, Marschall joined National League North club Gateshead on a six-month loan. Marschall made 19 appearances for the club as they were crowned champions at the end of the 2021–22 season. Upon returning from the loan, Marschall signed a contract extension with Villa. Manager Steven Gerrard took him as one of four goalkeepers to the club's pre-season tour of Australia in July 2022. In January 2023, Marschall returned to Gateshead for another six-month loan. He was an unused substitute in the club's FA Trophy run, which ended in a 1–0 defeat to FC Halifax Town in the final at Wembley Stadium. He played 20 National League games in the second half of the 2022–23 campaign.

On 14 December 2023, Marschall made his Aston Villa first-team debut in a UEFA Europa Conference League match away at Zrinjski Mostar. The victory meant that Unai Emery's Villans topped their group to secure qualification to the knockout stage.

On 19 January 2024, Marshall joined League Two club Milton Keynes Dons on loan until the end of the 2023–24 season.

On 19 July 2024, Marschall joined League Two club Crewe Alexandra on a season-long loan to compete with Tom Booth for a starting place. On 21 September, he kept a clean sheet in a 3–0 win over Harrogate Town, making five saves and claiming three high balls to earn himself a place on the EFL Team of the Week. He signed a new deal with Villa in December. In January 2025, Crewe confirmed that he would be remaining at the club for the rest of the 2024–25 season following the passing of the loan's break-date. Speaking in April, manager Lee Bell said he was a Player of the Season contender after he equalled the club's clean sheet record in the league (16). Marschall stated himself that he enjoyed working with goalkeeping coach Fred Barber and had gained a lot of self-belief at Gresty Road.

=== Stevenage ===
On 29 July 2025, Marschall signed for League One club Stevenage in an undisclosed transfer. He finished his debut season winning the League One Golden Glove, joint with George Wickens, keeping 19 clean sheets.

=== Millwall ===
On 1 September 2026, Marschall signed for EFL Championship club Millwall for an undisclosed fee.

== International career ==
Marschall is eligible for both the Polish and English national teams. He has featured twice for the England U19 side. He was also called up to a Poland U19 training camp in 2021.

== Style of play ==
Marschall is a goalkeeper who is comfortable with the ball at his feet.

== Career statistics ==
As of match played 29 August 2026

Appearances and goals by club, season, and competition
Club	Season	League			National cup		League cup		Europe		Other		Total	
Club	Season	Division	Apps	Goals	Apps	Goals	Apps	Goals	Apps	Goals	Apps	Goals	Apps	Goals
Aston Villa	2021–22	Premier League	0	0	0	0	0	0	—		—		0	0
Aston Villa	2022–23	Premier League	0	0	0	0	0	0	—		—		0	0
Aston Villa	2023–24	Premier League	0	0	0	0	0	0	1 (Note: Appearance in UEFA Europa Conference League)	0	—		1	0
Aston Villa	Total		0	0	0	0	0	0	1	0	0	0	1	0
Aston Villa U21	2022–23	—			—		—		—		3 (Note: Appearances in EFL Trophy)	0	3	0
Aston Villa U21	2023–24	—			—		—		—		3	0	3	0
Aston Villa U21	Total		0	0	0	0	0	0	0	0	6	0	6	0
Gateshead (loan)	2021–22	National League North	19	0	0	0	—		—		0	0	19	0
Gateshead (loan)	2022–23	National League	20	0	0	0	—		—		0	0	20	0
Gateshead (loan)	Total		39	0	0	0	0	0	0	0	0	0	39	0
Milton Keynes Dons (loan)	2023–24	League Two	6	0	—		—		—		1 (Note: Appearance in play-offs)	0	7	0
Crewe Alexandra (loan)	2024–25	League Two	46	0	1	0	1	0	—		3	0	51	0
Stevenage	2025–26	League One	45	0	1	0	0	0	—		2	0	48	0
Stevenage	2026–27	League One	3	0	0	0	2	0	—		—		5	0
Stevenage	Total		48	0	1	0	2	0	0	0	2	0	53	0
Millwall	2026–27	EFL Championship	0	0	0	0	0	0	—		—		0	0
Career total			136	0	2	0	1	0	1	0	12	0	152	0

== Honours ==
Aston Villa U18

- FA Youth Cup: 2020–21

Gateshead

- National League North: 2021–22
- FA Trophy runner-up: 2023

Individual

- EFL League One Golden Glove: 2025–26
