= Shilow Tracey =

English footballer (born 1998)

Personal information
- Full name: Shilow Ethan Tracey
- Date of birth: 29 April 1998 (age 28)
- Place of birth: Newham, England
- Height: 5 ft 10 in (1.79 m)
- Position: Winger

Team information
- Current team: Hornchurch

Senior career*
Years	Team	Apps	(Gls)
2014–2016	Ebbsfleet United	0	(0)
2016–2021	Tottenham Hotspur	0	(0)
2020	→ Macclesfield Town (loan)	7	(1)
2020–2021	→ Shrewsbury Town (loan)	8	(0)
2021	→ Cambridge United (loan)	17	(1)
2021–2023	Cambridge United	63	(3)
2023–2026	Crewe Alexandra	79	(9)
2026–	Hornchurch	1	(0)
- * Club domestic league appearances and goals as of 18:30, 21 November 2026 (UTC)

Shilow Tracey (born 29 April 1998) is an English professional footballer who plays as a winger for National League club Hornchurch.

== Career ==
Tracey began his career at Ebbsfleet United and made a single appearance for them in the Kent Senior Cup against Charlton Athletic.

=== Tottenham Hotspur ===
In the 2016 winter transfer window Tracey moved to Tottenham for an undisclosed fee. Paul Prenderville reviewed the player for Sky Sports quoting that Tracey is "Quick and strong, his performances for the Ebbsfleet youth team have drawn similarities with Yaya Toure". In July, 2018 Tracey signed a new contract committing to the club until 2020.

==== Loan spells ====
In January 2020, Tracey went out on loan to Macclesfield Town of League Two. On 8 February 2020 he made his football league debut away at Leyton Orient which ended 1–1. On 18 February, Tracey scored his first professional league goal in a 1–1 draw against Plymouth Argyle.

On 18 September 2020, Tracey joined League One side Shrewsbury Town on loan for the 2020–21 season. He scored his first goals for Shrewsbury on 10 November 2020 when he scored a hat-trick in an EFL Trophy group game against Crewe Alexandra.

On 25 January 2021, Tracey joined League Two side Cambridge United on loan for the remainder of the 2020–21 season.

=== Cambridge United ===
On 17 June 2021, Tracey signed a two-year deal with Cambridge United.

=== Crewe Alexandra ===
On 26 June 2023, Tracey joined EFL League Two club Crewe Alexandra after signing a two-year deal. He made his Crewe debut at Gresty Road on 5 August 2023, in a 2–2 draw with Mansfield Town, and scored his first Crewe goal in a 3–3 draw at Wrexham on 30 September 2023. On 4 March 2025, Tracey was stretchered off after suffering a broken leg during Crewe's League Two defeat by Fleetwood Town at Gresty Road. In July 2025, he signed a new one-year contract, with an option for a further year, to stay at Crewe. After a long recovery from his leg injury, Tracey began playing in under-21 games in March 2026. Manager Lee Bell hoped Tracey would contribute to the first team's final games of the season, and Tracey made a substitute appearance in Crewe's 3–2 defeat at Grimsby Town on 11 April 2026, plus two other appearances off the bench in the final two games of the season. On 13 May 2026, the club said he would be released in the summer when his contract expired.

=== Hornchurch ===
Tracey joined National League side Hornchurch on 20 November 2026.

== Career statistics ==
As of match played 21 November 2026

Appearances and goals by club, season and competition
Club	Season	League			FA Cup		League Cup		Other		Total	
Club	Season	Division	Apps	Goals	Apps	Goals	Apps	Goals	Apps	Goals	Apps	Goals
Ebbsfleet United	2014–15	Conference South	0	0	0	0	—		1 (Note: Appearance in the Kent Senior Cup)	0	1	0
Ebbsfleet United	2015–16	National League South	0	0	0	0	—		0	0	0	0
Ebbsfleet United	2016–17	National League South	0	0	0	0	—		0	0	0	0
Ebbsfleet United	Total		0	0	0	0	—		1	0	1	0
Tottenham Hotspur	2016–17	Premier League	0	0	0	0	0	0	0	0	0	0
Tottenham Hotspur U21	2017–18	—	—		—		—		3 (Note: Appearances in the EFL Trophy)	1	3	1
Tottenham Hotspur U21	2018–19	—	—		—		—		1	0	1	0
Tottenham Hotspur U21	2019–20	—	—		—		—		3	0	3	0
Tottenham Hotspur	2020–21	Premier League	0	0	0	0	0	0	0	0	0	0
Tottenham Hotspur	Total		—		—		—		7	1	7	1
Macclesfield Town (loan)	2019–20	League Two	7	1	0	0	0	0	0	0	7	1
Shrewsbury Town (loan)	2020–21	League One	8	0	1	0	0	0	3	4	12	4
Cambridge United (loan)	2020–21	League Two	17	1	0	0	0	0	0	0	17	1
Cambridge United	2021–22	League One	26	2	2	0	1	0	1	1	30	3
Cambridge United	2022–23	League One	37	1	3	0	2	0	1	0	43	1
Cambridge United	Total		63	3	5	0	3	0	2	1	73	4
Crewe Alexandra	2023–24	League Two	43	3	2	0	2	0	4 (Note: One appearance in the EFL Trophy; three appearances in EFL League Two play-offs.)	0	51	3
Crewe Alexandra	2024–25	League Two	33	6	1	0	1	0	0	0	35	6
Crewe Alexandra	2025–26	League Two	3	0	0	0	0	0	0	0	3	0
Crewe Alexandra	Total		79	9	3	0	3	0	4	0	89	9
Hornchurch	2026–27	National League	1	0	0	0	—		0	0	1	0
Career total			173	14	9	0	6	0	17	6	205	20
