= 2024–25 Crewe Alexandra F.C. season =

148th season in existence of Crewe Alexandra FC

Crewe Alexandra
2024–25 season
- Chairman: Charles Grant
- Manager: Lee Bell
- Stadium: Gresty Road
- League Two: 13th
- FA Cup: First round
- EFL Cup: First round
- EFL Trophy: Round of 32
- Top goalscorer: League: Jack Lankester (7); All: Chris Long (8)

The 2024–25 season was the 148th season in the history of Crewe Alexandra Football Club and their third consecutive season in League Two. The club participated in the League Two, the FA Cup, the EFL Cup, and the EFL Trophy.

== Transfers ==
=== In ===
Date	Pos.	Player	From	Fee	Ref.
27 June 2024	RW	Jack Lankester (ENG)	Cambridge United (ENG)	Undisclosed	
1 July 2024 (Note: The transfer was announced on 21 June, and would become official on July 1 once his Stevenage contract expired)	CF	Kane Hemmings (ENG)	Stevenage (ENG)	Free	
1 July 2024 (Note: The transfer was announced on 26 June, and would become official on July 1 once his Beckenham Town contract expired)	CF	Fin Roberts (Note: Signed initially for the U21s) (ENG)	Beckenham Town (ENG)	Free	
3 July 2024	CM	Max Sanders (ENG)	Leyton Orient (ENG)	Undisclosed	
5 July 2024	CF	Omar Bogle (ENG)	Newport County (WAL)	Free	
1 August 2024	CB	James Connolly (WAL)	Bristol Rovers (ENG)	Undisclosed	
20 August 2024	CF	Adrien Thibaut (Note: Signed initially for the U21s) (IRL)	Bradford (Park Avenue) (ENG)	Free	

=== Out ===
Date	Pos.	Player	To	Fee	Ref.
14 June 2024 (Note: The transfer was announced on 7 June, and would become official on June 14 once the transfer window re-opens)	GK	Dave Richards (WAL)	Dundee United (SCO)	Free	
3 July 2024	LB	Rio Adebisi (ENG)	Peterborough United (ENG)	Undisclosed	

=== Loaned in ===
Date	Pos.	Player	From	Date until	Ref.
1 July 2024 (Note: The loan was announced on 24 June, and would officially commence on July 1)	CB	Jamie Knight-Lebel (CAN)	Bristol City (ENG)	End of season	
19 July 2024	GK	Filip Marschall (ENG)	Aston Villa (ENG)	End of season	
9 August 2024	LB	Max Conway (ENG)	Bolton Wanderers (ENG)	End of season	
12 August 2024	CM	Kian Breckin (ENG)	Manchester City (ENG)	21 January 2025 (Note: On 21 January, Breckin was recalled to his parent club Manchester City)	
20 January 2025	CB	Connor O'Riordan (IRL)	Blackburn Rovers (ENG)	End of season	
30 January 2025	CM	Tom Lowery (WAL)	Portsmouth (ENG)	End of season	

=== Loaned out ===
Date	Pos.	Player	To	Date until	Ref.
10 September 2024	LB	Charlie Finney (ENG)	Buxton (ENG)	15 October 2024	
8 November 2024	CB	Lucas Sant (ENG)	Hanley Town (ENG)	7 December 2024	
22 November 2024	LW	Calum Agius (WAL)	Marine (ENG)	2 January 2024	
21 January 2025	RW	Fin Roberts (ENG)	Chester (ENG)	17 February 2025 (Note: On 17 February, Roberts was recalled from his short-term loan at Chester)	
31 January 2025	DM	Owen Lunt (ENG)	Southport (ENG)	1 March 2025	
27 March 2025	RW	Fin Roberts (ENG)	Kidderminster Harriers (ENG)	End of season	

=== Released / Out of Contract ===
Date	Pos.	Player	Subsequent club	Join date	Ref.
30 June 2024	CF	Elliott Nevitt (ENG)	Gillingham (ENG)	1 July 2024	
30 June 2024	CB	Luke Offord (ENG)	Milton Keynes Dons (ENG)	1 July 2024	
30 June 2024	CF	Courtney Baker-Richardson (ENG)	Newport County (WAL)	10 July 2024	
30 June 2024	CB	Billy Sass-Davies (WAL)	Hartlepool United (ENG)	3 August 2024	
30 June 2024	CM	Charlie Colkett (ENG)	Gateshead (ENG)	20 August 2024	
30 June 2024	LW	Charlie Kirk (ENG)	Barrow (ENG)	22 October 2024	
30 June 2024	CB	Zak Kempster-Down (ENG)			
30 June 2024	CF	Max Woodcock (SCO)			

== Pre-season and friendlies ==
On 4 June, Crewe announced their pre-season preparations, with matches against Newcastle Town, Stafford Rangers, Stoke City, Tamworth and Blackpool. Two weeks later, the club confirmed the squad would travel to Algarve for a five-day training camp.

Win Draw Loss Fixtures

13 July 2024 Friendly	Newcastle Town	0–5	Crewe Alexandra	Newcastle-under-Lyme
15:00 BST		Report	Tabiner; Lankester (x2); Hemmings; Sanders	Stadium: Lyme Valley Stadium

16 July 2024 Friendly	Stafford Rangers	1–4	Crewe Alexandra	Stafford
19:30 BST	Cockerline 49'	Report	Lankester 17'; Billington 24'; Thomas 46'; Tracey 62'	Stadium: The Stan Robinson Stadium

22 July 2024 Friendly	Crewe Alexandra	1–3	RCD Mallorca	Bodymoor Heath
14:00 BST	Moore 73'	Report	Lato 55'; Domènech 57'; Muriqi 86'	Stadium: Bodymoor Heath Training Ground; Attendance: 0 (Behind-closed-doors)

23 July 2024 Friendly	Crewe Alexandra	1–2	Stoke City	Crewe
19:30 BST	Sanders 2'	Report	Vidigal 62', 87'	Stadium: Gresty Road; Attendance: 4,831

27 July 2024 Friendly	Warrington Rylands	2–3	Crewe Alexandra	Warrington
15:00 BST	Burns 44', 60'	Report	Hemmings 58'; Roberts 74', 76'	Stadium: Gorsey Lane

3 August 2024 Friendly	Crewe Alexandra	0–2	Blackpool	Crewe
15:00 BST		Report	Joseph 1'; Rhodes 39'	Stadium: Gresty Road; Attendance: 1,956; Referee: E Bell

== Competitions ==
=== League Two ===
==== League table ====
Pos	Team	Pld	W	D	L	GF	GA	GD	Pts
11	Bromley	46	17	15	14	64	59	+5	66
12	Swindon Town	46	15	17	14	71	63	+8	62
13	Crewe Alexandra	46	15	17	14	49	48	+1	62
14	Fleetwood Town	46	15	15	16	60	60	0	60
15	Cheltenham Town	46	16	12	18	60	70	−10	60

Source: EFL Official Website
Rules for classification: 1) Points; 2) Goal difference; 3) Number of goals scored; 4) Head-to-head results; 5) Wins; 6) Away goals; 7) Penalty points (sec 9.5); 8) 12-point sending off offences

==== Results summary ====
Overall								Home						Away					
Pld	W	D	L	GF	GA	GD	Pts	W	D	L	GF	GA	GD	W	D	L	GF	GA	GD
44	15	17	12	49	45	+4	62	9	6	7	30	26	+4	6	11	5	19	19	0

Last updated: 21 April 2025.
Source: Soccerway

==== Results by round ====
Round	1	2	3	4	5	6	7	8	10	11	12	13	14	15	16	17	18	19	20	21	22	23	24	25	26	27	28	29	30	31	9^{1}	32	33	34	35	36	37	38	39	40	41	42	43	44	45	46
Ground	A	H	H	A	H	A	H	A	H	A	H	A	H	A	H	A	A	H	A	H	A	A	H	H	A	A	H	H	A	H	A	A	H	A	H	A	H	A	H	H	A	H	A	H	A	H
Result	L	L	D	W	W	W	W	L	W	D	D	W	W	D	W	D	D	D	W	D	L	D	W	W	D	W	L	D	D	L	L	D	W	W	L	D	D	D	L	W	L	L	D	L	L	L
Position	17	24	23	18	13	9	7	8	8	9	9	6	5	5	2	3	3	4	3	4	4	7	4	2	2	2	2	4	5	8	8	7	7	7	7	7	8	9	9	8	9	11	11	11	12	13
Points	0	0	1	4	7	10	13	13	16	17	18	21	24	25	28	29	30	31	34	35	35	36	39	42	43	46	46	47	48	48	48	49	52	55	55	56	57	58	58	61	61	61	62	62	62	62

Source: EFL
A = Away; H = Home; W = Win; D = Draw; L = Loss; P = Postponed
Notes:
- ^{1} Matchday 9 (vs. AFC Wimbledon) was postponed due to Wimbledon's EFL Cup involvements.

==== Matches ====
On 26 June, the League Two fixtures were announced.

Win Draw Loss Fixtures

10 August 2024 1	Barrow	1–0	Crewe Alexandra	Barrow-in-Furness
15:00 BST	Vassell 22'; Spence (yellow card) 37'; Dallas (yellow card) 90+1'; Farman (yellow card) 90+3'	Report	Thomas (yellow card) 39'; Hemmings (yellow card) 90+8'	Stadium: Holker Street; Attendance: 3,585; Referee: Martin Coy

17 August 2024 2	Crewe Alexandra	0–5	Chesterfield	Crewe
15:00 BST		Report	Berry-McNally 1', 12'; Grigg 11' (yellow card) 62'; Naylor 28' (yellow card) 87'; Daley-Campbell (yellow card) 47'; Dobra 49'	Stadium: Gresty Road; Attendance: 5,626; Referee: Scott Tallis

24 August 2024 3	Crewe Alexandra	0–0	Swindon Town	Crewe
12:30 BST	Demetriou (yellow card) 44'; Tabiner (yellow card) 51'	Report	Cotterill (yellow card) 24'	Stadium: Gresty Road; Attendance: 4,402; Referee: Alex Chilowicz

31 August 2024 4	Bromley	1–2	Crewe Alexandra	Bromley
15:00 BST	Leigh 2'; Thompson (yellow card) 78'; Reynolds (yellow card) 81'	Report	Tracey (yellow card) 45'; Demetriou 83'; Long 90+1'; Sanders (yellow card) 90+2'	Stadium: Hayes Lane; Attendance: 3,322; Referee: Scott Jackson

7 September 2024 5	Crewe Alexandra	1–0	Morecambe	Crewe
15:00 BST	Tracey (yellow card) 9'; Hemmings 43' (pen.); Williams (yellow card) 71'	Report	Songo'o (yellow card) 71'; Angol (yellow card) 86'	Stadium: Gresty Road; Attendance: 4,868; Referee: Scott Simpson

14 September 2024 6	Accrington Stanley	0–1	Crewe Alexandra	Accrington
15:00 BST	Kelly (yellow card) 90+7'	Report	Lankester (yellow card) 70'; Knight-Lebel (yellow card) 76'; Williams 85'	Stadium: Crown Ground; Attendance: 2,883; Referee: David Rock

21 September 2024 7	Crewe Alexandra	3–0	Harrogate Town	Crewe
15:00 GMT	Hemmings 7', 88'; Lankester 31', (yellow card) 68'; Tabiner (yellow card) 46'; Knight-Lebel (yellow card) 87'	Report	Gibson (yellow card) 28'; Cornelius (yellow card) 37'; Taylor (yellow card) 79'	Stadium: Gresty Road; Attendance: 4,320; Referee: Ruebyn Ricardo

28 September 2024 8	Newport County	2–1	Crewe Alexandra	Newport
15:00 BST	Evans (yellow card) 22', (goal) 33'; Glennon (yellow card) 45+6'; Baker 74', (yellow card) 90+3'	Report	Knight-Lebel (yellow card) 3'; Lankester (yellow card) 37'; Thibaut 71'; Breckin (yellow card) 90+1'	Stadium: Rodney Parade; Attendance: 4,273; Referee: Alan Young

5 October 2024 10	Crewe Alexandra	2–0	Gillingham	Crewe
15:00 BST	Lankester (yellow card) 16'; Tracey 17', 60'; Breckin (yellow card) 33'; Holíček (yellow card) 81'	Report		Stadium: Gresty Road; Attendance: 5,000; Referee: Anthony Backhouse

12 October 2024 11	Doncaster Rovers	1–1	Crewe Alexandra	Doncaster
15:00 BST	Hurst 73'	Report	Cooney (yellow card) 30'; Tabiner (yellow card) 40'; Conway 56'; Thibaut (yellow card) 76'	Stadium: Eco-Power Stadium; Attendance: 7,472; Referee: Ben Atkinson

19 October 2024 12	Crewe Alexandra	1–1	Salford City	Crewe
15:00 BST	Cooney 26'	Report	Woodburn 12', (yellow card) 60'; Fornah (yellow card) 39'; Lund (yellow card) 85'	Stadium: Gresty Road; Attendance: 4,936; Referee: Sunny Singh Gill

22 October 2024 13	Fleetwood Town	0–1	Crewe Alexandra	Fleetwood
19:45 GMT		Report	Tabiner (yellow card) 17'; Conway (yellow card) 59'; Cooney 87' (pen.)	Stadium: Highbury Stadium; Attendance: 2,725; Referee: Seb Stockbridge

26 October 2024 14	Crewe Alexandra	3–1	Tranmere Rovers	Crewe
15:00 BST	Tracey 39', 54'; Cooney (yellow card) 77'; Marschall (yellow card) 82'; Tabiner 84'; Demetriou (yellow card) 90+1'	Report	Jennings 8'; Norman (yellow card) 32'; Bradshaw (yellow card) 41'; Patrick (yellow card) 77'	Stadium: Gresty Road; Attendance: 5,957; Referee: James Durkin

9 November 2024 15	Walsall	1–1	Crewe Alexandra	Bescot
15:00 GMT	Okagbue (yellow card) 40'; Matt (yellow card) 63'; Lowe 85'; Allen (yellow card) 88'; Gordon (yellow card) 90+10'	Report	Sanders (yellow card) 20'; Bogle 66'; Cooney (yellow card) 75'; Tracey (yellow card) 77'; Thibaut (yellow card) 89'	Stadium: Bescot Stadium; Attendance: 8,105; Referee: Stephen Parkinson

16 November 2024 16	Crewe Alexandra	2–0	Notts County	Crewe
15:00 GMT	Tracey 40', (yellow card) 80'; Holíček (yellow card) 57'; Cooney 62' (pen.), (yellow card) 64'; Williams (yellow card) 67'; Marschall (yellow card) 71'; Sanders (yellow card) 75'; Long (red card) 84'	Report	Bedeau (yellow card) 3'	Stadium: Gresty Road; Attendance: 6,127; Referee: Steven Copeland

25 November 2024 17	Port Vale	1–1	Crewe Alexandra	Burslem
20:00 GMT	Shorrock 3'; Hart (yellow card) 15'; Harper (yellow card) 33' (yellow-red card) 49'; Croasdale (yellow card) 90+3'	Report	Cooney (yellow card) 65'; Lankester 90+2'	Stadium: Vale Park; Attendance: 10,022; Referee: Thomas Kirk
Note: Fixture was initially scheduled for 23 November, but was moved for live Sky Sports broadcast.

30 November 2024 18	Carlisle United	1–1	Crewe Alexandra	Carlisle
12:30 GMT	Sadi 2'; Harris (yellow card) 64'; Jones (yellow card) 72'; Kelly (yellow card) 81'; Neal (yellow card) 89'	Report	Connolly (yellow card) 11'; Billington (yellow card) 12'; Lankester 82' (pen.)	Stadium: Brunton Park; Attendance: 5,839; Referee: Elliot Bell
Note: Fixture was initially scheduled for 3 December, but was moved following both teams exiting the FA Cup.

7 December 2024 19	Crewe Alexandra	1–1	Bradford City	Crewe
12:30 GMT	Bogle 47'; Tracey (yellow card) 51'; Sanders (yellow card) 54'; Williams (yellow card) 58'; Powell (yellow card) 90+2'	Report	Baldwin (yellow card) 40'; Benn (yellow card) 48'; Pattison 55', (red card) 57'; Smallwood (yellow card) 58'; Shepherd (yellow card) 90+6'; Walker (yellow card) 90+7'	Stadium: Gresty Road; Referee: Ben Toner
Note: Fixture was initially scheduled for a 15:00 kick-off, but was moved for live Sky Sports broadcast.

14 December 2024 20	Grimsby Town	0–2	Crewe Alexandra	Cleethorpes
15:00 GMT	Thompson (yellow card) 47'	Report	Lankester 55'; Demetriou (yellow card) 62'; Tabiner 63'; Connolly (yellow card) 71'; Williams (yellow card) 73'	Stadium: Blundell Park; Attendance: 5,745; Referee: James Durkin

20 December 2024 21	Crewe Alexandra	0–0	Colchester United	Crewe
19:45 GMT	Williams (yellow card) 7'	Report	Iandolo (yellow card) 87'	Stadium: Gresty Road; Attendance: 9,288; Referee: Geoff Eltringham
Note: Fixture was initially scheduled for 21 December, but was moved for live Sky Sports broadcast.

26 December 2024 22	Cheltenham Town	2–1	Crewe Alexandra	Cheltenham
15:00 GMT	Colwill 70', 83'; Bowman (yellow card) 90+3'	Report	Holíček (yellow card) 34'; Connolly (yellow card) 51'; Lankester 56'; Tracey (yellow card) 68'; Williams (yellow card) 74'	Stadium: Whaddon Road; Attendance: 5,261; Referee: Alan Young

29 December 2024 23	Milton Keynes Dons	1–1	Crewe Alexandra	Denbigh
15:00 GMT	White 9'; Sherring (yellow card) 49'; Gilbey (yellow card) 75'; Hogan (yellow card) 82'	Report	Knight-Lebel 56', (yellow card) 88'; Conway (yellow card) 62'	Stadium: Stadium MK; Attendance: 7,508; Referee: Greg Rollason

1 January 2025 24	Crewe Alexandra	3–2	Carlisle United	Crewe
15:00 GMT	Long 32'; Williams (yellow card) 35'; Knight-Lebel (yellow card) 86'; Conway (yellow card) 90+2'; Bogle 90+3'; Lankester 90+8'	Report	Lavelle (yellow card) 8'; Ellis 21'; Neal (yellow card) 53'; Harris 78'; Breeze (yellow card) 84'; Biggins (yellow card) 90+6'	Stadium: Gresty Road; Attendance: 6,345; Referee: Simon Mather

5 January 2025 25	Crewe Alexandra	4–1	Bromley	Crewe
15:00 GMT	Bogle 28', 32'; Lankester 38'; Billington (yellow card) 55'; Cooney (yellow card) 74'; Knight-Lebel 82'	Report	Cheek 36' (pen.); Smith (yellow card) 52'; Grant (yellow card) 75' (yellow-red card) 79'; Sowunmi (yellow card) 82'	Stadium: Gresty Road; Attendance: 4,462; Referee: Scott Jackson
Note: Fixture was initially scheduled for 4 January, but was moved for live Sky Sports broadcast.

11 January 2025 26	Swindon Town	0–0	Crewe Alexandra	Swindon
15:00 GMT		Report	Demetriou (yellow card) 64'	Stadium: County Ground; Attendance: 6,638; Referee: Lee Swabey

18 January 2025 27	Morecambe	0–1	Crewe Alexandra	Morecambe
15:00 GMT	Williams (yellow card) 45+1'	Report	Sanders (yellow card) 19'; Long 68'; Knight-Lebel (yellow card) 74'; Williams (yellow card) 77'	Stadium: Mazuma Mobile Stadium; Attendance: 3,648; Referee: Paul Howard

25 January 2025 28	Crewe Alexandra	0–1	Accrington Stanley	Crewe
15:00 GMT	Cooney (yellow card) 31'; Knight-Lebel (yellow card) 33'; Bogle (yellow card) 83'	Report	Whalley 16', (yellow card) 58'; Batty (yellow card) 48'; Hunter (yellow card) 77'; Woods (yellow card) 90+3'	Stadium: Gresty Road; Attendance: 4,965; Referee: Alex Chilowicz

28 January 2025 29	Crewe Alexandra	1–1	AFC Wimbledon	Crewe
19:45 GMT	Knight-Lebel 14'; Holíček (yellow card) 74'	Report	Neufville 45+1'	Stadium: Gresty Road; Attendance: 4,039; Referee: Lewis Smith

1 February 2025 30	Harrogate Town	1–1	Crewe Alexandra	Harrogate
15:00 GMT	March 28'; Sutton (yellow card) 52'	Report	Long 58'	Stadium: Wetherby Road; Attendance: 2,704; Referee: Michael Barlow

8 February 2025 31	Crewe Alexandra	0–3	Newport County	Crewe
15:00 GMT	Thibaut (yellow card) 90'	Report	Antwi 33', (yellow card) 67'; Ajiboye 45+2', (yellow card) 60'; Thomas (yellow card) 66'; Baker-Richardson 82'	Stadium: Gresty Road; Attendance: 4,472; Referee: James Oldham

11 February 2025 9	AFC Wimbledon	3–0	Crewe Alexandra	Wimbledon
19:45 GMT	Stevens 41' (pen.), 56'; Reeves 45+2'	Report	Lowery (yellow card) 5'; Williams (yellow card) 21'; Knigh-Lebel (red card) 39'; Conway (yellow card) 71'; Powell (yellow card) 77'	Stadium: Plough Lane; Attendance: 7,662; Referee: Andrew Humphries
Note: Fixture was originally scheduled for 1 October, but was postponed due to Wimbledon's EFL Cup involvements.

15 February 2025 32	Gillingham	0–0	Crewe Alexandra	Gillingham
15:00 GMT	Ehmer (yellow card) 70'	Report	Tracey (yellow card) 45+1'; Cooney (yellow card) 58' (yellow-red card) 75'; O'Riordan (yellow card) 90'	Stadium: Priestfield Stadium; Attendance: 5,663; Referee: Jamie O'Connor

22 February 2025 33	Crewe Alexandra	3-0	Barrow	Crewe
12:30 GMT	O'Riordan 37' Lowery 50' (pen.) Holíček 85'	Report		Stadium: Gresty Road; Attendance: 4,735; Referee: David Rock
Note: Fixture was initially scheduled for a 15:00 kick-off, but was moved for live Sky Sports broadcasting.

1 March 2025 34	Chesterfield	1–3	Crewe Alexandra	Chesterfield
15:00 GMT	Duffy 87'		Tracey 11'; Conway 22'; Lowery 90+3'	Stadium: SMH Group Stadium; Attendance: 8,919; Referee: Scott Tallis

4 March 2025 35	Crewe Alexandra	1–4	Fleetwood Town	Crewe
19:45 GMT	O'Riordan (yellow card) 55'; Long 90+1'	Report	Graydon 11'; Marsh 33'; Bennett 79'; Patterson 89'	Stadium: Gresty Road; Referee: Benjamin Speedie

8 March 2025 36	Salford City	1–1	Crewe Alexandra	Kersal
15:00 GMT	Ashley (yellow card) 65'; N'Mai 68'; Garbutt (yellow card) 88'; Longelo (yellow card) 90+4'; Edwards (yellow card) 90+4'	Report	Lowery (yellow card) 64'; O'Riordan 79'; Thomas (yellow card) 81'; Billington (yellow card) 81'; Holíček (yellow card) 90+4'	Stadium: Moor Lane; Attendance: 3,524; Referee: Zac Kennard-Kettle

15 March 2025 37	Crewe Alexandra	1-1	Doncaster Rovers	Crewe
12:30 GMT	O'Riordan 10'	Report	Molyneux (yellow card) 57'; Bailey 75'	Stadium: Gresty Road; Attendance: 5,142; Referee: Matthew Corlett
Note: Fixture was initially scheduled for a 15:00 kick-off, but was moved for live Sky Sports broadcasting.

22 March 2025 38	Notts County	0-0	Crewe Alexandra	Nottingham
12:30 GMT	Whitaker (yellow card) 38'; Bedeau (yellow card) 45'; Abbott (yellow card) 81'	Report	Demetriou (yellow card) 83'	Stadium: Meadow Lane; Attendance: 10,225; Referee: Martin Woods
Note: Fixture was initially scheduled for a 15:00 kick-off, but was moved for live Sky Sports broadcasting.

29 March 2025 39	Crewe Alexandra	0–1	Port Vale	Crewe
12:30 GMT	Demetriou (yellow card) 46'; Williams (yellow card) 51'; Holíček (yellow card) 59'; Sanders (yellow card) 69'	Report	Clark (yellow card) 42'; Sang (yellow card) 72'; Stockley 86'; Shorrock (yellow card) 90+3'	Stadium: Gresty Road; Attendance: 8,365; Referee: Martin Coy
Note: Fixture was initially scheduled for a 15:00 kick-off, but was moved for live Sky Sports broadcasting.

1 April 2025 40	Crewe Alexandra	2–0	Grimsby Town	Crewe
19:45 BST	Long 14'; Demetriou (yellow card) 31', (goal) 90+3'; Cooney (yellow card) 58'; Lankester (yellow card) 87'; Agius (yellow card) 87'	Report	Luker (yellow card) 38'; McEachran (yellow card) 57'; Rodgers (yellow card) 62'	Stadium: Gresty Road; Attendance: 4,512; Referee: Paul Marsden

5 April 2025 41	Bradford City	2–0	Crewe Alexandra	Bradford
15:00 BST	Pointon 1'; Halliday (yellow card) 59'; Baldwin (yellow card) 63'; Adaramola (yellow card) 82'; Kavanagh 85', (yellow card) 86'	Report	Cooney (yellow card) 21', (penalty missed) 40'; Conway (yellow card) 32'; Marschall (yellow card) 76'	Stadium: Valley Parade; Attendance: 22,214; Referee: Adam Herczeg

10 April 2025 42	Crewe Alexandra	2–3	Cheltenham Town	Crewe
20:00 BST	Williams (yellow card) 34'; Hemmings 45' (pen.); Agius 90+5'	Report	Miller 22'; Haynes (penalty missed) 33'; Bennett (yellow card) 73'; Thomas 78'; Dulson 86'	Stadium: Gresty Road; Attendance: 4,939; Referee: Declan Bourne

18 April 2025 43	Colchester United	0–0	Crewe Alexandra	Colchester
19:45 GMT	Tovide (yellow card) 86'; Read (penalty missed) 87'	Report	Lunt (red card) 45+5'; Billington (yellow card) 53'; Long (yellow card) 82'; Williams (yellow card) 86'; Marschall (yellow card) 86'	Stadium: Colchester Community Stadium; Attendance: 7,623; Referee: Scott Oldham

21 April 2025 44	Crewe Alexandra	0–1	Milton Keynes Dons	Crewe
15:00 BST	Thomas (yellow card) 42'	Report	Hogan 28'; Offord (yellow card) 38'; Nemane (yellow card) 50'	Stadium: Gresty Road; Attendance: 4,954; Referee: Charles Breakspear

26 April 2025 45	Tranmere Rovers	2–0	Crewe Alexandra	Birkenhead
15:00 BST	Davies 22'; Hendry (yellow card) 84' (yellow-red card) 90+2'; Dennis 87' (yellow card) 30'; Davison (yellow card) 90+5'; McGee (yellow card) 90+5'	Report	Lowery (red card) 69'; Williams (red card) 90+4'; Thibaut (yellow card) 90+5'	Stadium: Prenton Park; Attendance: 9,496; Referee: Thomas Parsons

3 May 2025 46	Crewe Alexandra	0–1	Walsall	Crewe
15:00 BST	Agius (yellow card) 62'; Sanders (yellow card) 72'	Report	Hall 59'	Stadium: Gresty Road; Attendance: 7,112; Referee: Matthew Corlett

=== FA Cup ===
Crewe Alexandra were drawn at home to Dagenham & Redbridge in the first round.

Win Draw Loss Fixtures

2 November 2024 First round	Crewe Alexandra	0–1	Dagenham & Redbridge	Crewe
15:00 GMT	Demetriou (yellow card) 12'	Report	Pereira 73' (pen.), (yellow card) 80'	Stadium: Gresty Road; Attendance: 3,133; Referee: John Mulligan

=== EFL Cup ===
On 27 June, the draw for the first round was made, with Crewe being drawn away against Rotherham United.

Win Draw Loss Fixtures

13 August 2024 First round	Rotherham United	2–1	Crewe Alexandra	Rotherham
19:45 BST	Raggett (yellow card) 1'; Nombe 55'; Odoffin 86'	Report	Holíček 50'; Lunt (yellow card) 54'	Stadium: New York Stadium; Attendance: 2,182; Referee: Scott Oldham

=== EFL Trophy ===
In the group stage, Crewe were drawn into Northern Group E alongside Blackpool, Harrogate Town and Liverpool U21. In the round of 32, Crewe were drawn away to Wrexham.

==== Group stage ====
Pos	Div	Team	Pld	W	PW	PL	L	GF	GA	GD	Pts	Qualification
1	L1	Blackpool	3	1	1	1	0	6	3	+3	6	Advance to Round 2
2	L2	Crewe Alexandra	3	2	0	0	1	7	5	+2	6	Advance to Round 2
3	ACA	Liverpool U21	3	0	1	1	1	2	6	−4	3	
4	L2	Harrogate Town	3	0	1	1	1	3	4	−1	3	

Source: EFL

Win Draw Loss Fixtures

27 August 2024 Group stage	Crewe Alexandra	5–1	Liverpool U21	Crewe
19:30 BST	Roberts 3'; Connolly (yellow card) 10'; Long 30', 43'; Breckin (yellow card) 36'; Cooney 51' (pen.); Thibaut 74'	Report	Corness 10' (pen.), (penalty missed) 57'	Stadium: Gresty Road; Attendance: 1,445; Referee: Neil Hair

3 September 2024 Group stage	Blackpool	4–1	Crewe Alexandra	Blackpool
19:00 BST	Rhodes 3'; Hamilton 43', 63'; Carey 55'; Ashworth (yellow card) 88'	Report	Lunt (yellow card) 23'; Billington (yellow card) 31'; Breckin (yellow card) 45+2'; Tabiner (yellow card) 58'; Bogle 65'	Stadium: Bloomfield Road; Attendance: 1,474; Referee: Martin Woods

8 October 2024 Group stage	Crewe Alexandra	1–0	Harrogate Town	Crewe
19:45 BST	Agius 30'	Report		Stadium: Gresty Road; Attendance: 780; Referee: James Oldham

==== Knockout stages ====
10 December 2024 Round of 32	Wrexham	1–0	Crewe Alexandra	Wrexham
19:30 GMT	James 79'	Report	Connolly (yellow card) 67'	Stadium: Racecourse Ground; Attendance: 3,119; Referee: Martin Woods

== Statistics ==
=== Appearances and goals ===
As of match played 21 April 2025

Players with no appearances are not included on the list
Italics indicate a loaned in player

No.	Pos	Nat	Player	Total		League Two		FA Cup		EFL Cup		EFL Trophy	
No.	Pos	Nat	Player	Apps	Goals	Apps	Goals	Apps	Goals	Apps	Goals	Apps	Goals
1	GK	(England) ENG	Tom Booth	1	0	0+0	0	0+0	0	0+0	0	1+0	0
2	DF	(England) ENG	Ryan Cooney	43	4	31+7	3	0+0	0	1+0	0	3+1	1
3	DF	(Canada) CAN	Jamie Knight-Lebel	27	3	18+4	3	1+0	0	1+0	0	2+1	0
4	DF	(Wales) WAL	Zac Williams	44	1	40+0	1	0+1	0	1+0	0	1+1	0
5	DF	(England) ENG	Mickey Demetriou	37	2	35+0	2	1+0	0	0+1	0	0+0	0
6	MF	(England) ENG	Max Sanders	43	0	30+9	0	1+0	0	0+1	0	0+2	0
7	FW	(England) ENG	Chris Long	26	8	6+17	6	0+1	0	0+0	0	2+0	2
8	MF	(England) ENG	Conor Thomas	17	0	11+6	0	0+0	0	0+0	0	0+0	0
9	FW	(England) ENG	Omar Bogle	31	6	13+16	5	0+1	0	0+0	0	0+1	1
10	FW	(England) ENG	Shilow Tracey	35	6	28+5	6	1+0	0	1+0	0	0+0	0
11	MF	(England) ENG	Joel Tabiner	45	2	35+5	2	1+0	0	0+1	0	1+2	0
12	GK	(England) ENG	Filip Marschall	49	0	44+0	0	1+0	0	1+0	0	3+0	0
14	FW	(England) ENG	Jack Lankester	26	7	16+7	7	0+0	0	1+0	0	1+1	0
15	FW	(England) ENG	Kane Hemmings	20	4	14+5	4	0+0	0	0+1	0	0+0	0
16	DF	(England) ENG	Lucas Sant	1	0	0+0	0	0+0	0	0+0	0	0+1	0
17	MF	(Slovakia) SVK	Matúš Holíček	44	2	31+7	1	0+1	0	1+0	1	2+2	0
18	DF	(Wales) WAL	James Connolly	25	0	14+6	0	1+0	0	1+0	0	3+0	0
19	MF	(England) ENG	Owen Lunt	21	0	3+12	0	1+0	0	1+0	0	4+0	0
20	FW	(Wales) WAL	Calum Agius	15	2	0+12	1	0+0	0	0+0	0	2+1	1
21	MF	(England) ENG	Fin Roberts	7	1	0+3	0	0+0	0	0+1	0	3+0	1
22	DF	(England) ENG	Stan Dancey	2	0	0+0	0	0+0	0	0+0	0	1+1	0
23	MF	(England) ENG	Jack Powell	23	0	11+11	0	0+0	0	0+0	0	1+0	0
24	MF	(England) ENG	Charlie Finney	12	0	0+9	0	0+0	0	0+0	0	3+0	0
25	DF	(England) ENG	Max Conway	48	2	42+2	2	1+0	0	1+0	0	1+1	0
26	DF	(Republic of Ireland) IRL	Connor O'Riordan	18	3	17+1	3	0+0	0	0+0	0	0+0	0
27	MF	(Wales) WAL	Owen Taylor	1	0	0+0	0	0+0	0	0+0	0	1+0	0
28	DF	(England) ENG	Lewis Billington	26	0	14+7	0	1+0	0	0+0	0	4+0	0
29	FW	(Republic of Ireland) IRL	Adrien Thibaut	20	2	4+12	1	1+0	0	0+0	0	2+1	1
30	MF	(England) ENG	Tom Lowery	16	2	14+2	2	0+0	0	0+0	0	0+0	0
32	MF	(England) ENG	Luca Moore	2	0	0+1	0	0+0	0	0+0	0	0+1	0
33	MF	(England) ENG	Oliver Armstrong	1	0	0+0	0	0+0	0	0+0	0	0+1	0
34	MF	(England) ENG	Will Perry	1	0	0+0	0	0+0	0	0+0	0	0+1	0
36	MF	(England) ENG	Joe Collins	1	0	0+0	0	0+0	0	0+0	0	0+1	0
Player(s) who featured whilst on loan but returned to parent club during the season:
26	MF	(England) ENG	Kian Breckin	18	0	3+10	0	0+1	0	1+0	0	3+0	0
