= Kian Breckin =

English footballer (born 2003)

Personal information
- Full name: Kian Breckin
- Date of birth: 10 December 2003 (age 22)
- Position: Midfielder

Team information
- Current team: Altrincham
- Number: 12

Senior career*
Years	Team	Apps	(Gls)
2022–2026	Manchester City	0	(0)
2023	→ Wycombe Wanderers (loan)	2	(0)
2024–2025	→ Crewe Alexandra (loan)	13	(0)
2026–	Altrincham	1	(0)
- * Club domestic league appearances and goals as of 10:54, 26 May 2026 (UTC)

Kian Breckin (born 10 December 2003) is an English professional footballer who plays as a midfielder for National League club Altrincham.

== Early and personal life ==
Breckin joined the Manchester City Academy in 2015, when he was eleven years-old. He attended St Alban's Primary School in Wickersley prior to his family moving from Rotherham in Yorkshire to Sale, Greater Manchester in order for him to be closer to the Manchester City training centre. His mother, Leanne, is a former international gymnast. His father is the former professional footballer Ian Breckin, his uncle is the former Rotherham United player and manager John Breckin. He has a sister called Ava.

== Career ==
=== Manchester City ===
Breckin moved up to the Manchester City under-18 team in 2020. He played a key role in two U18 Premier League title wins, in 2021 and 2022. He progressed to Manchester City's Elite Development Squad in 2022. During the following season, he played in 24 league games, as his team won the Premier League 2 title in 2023. Breckin has also played in two UEFA Youth League matches with Manchester City. Breckin played every minute for Manchester City that season in the EFL Trophy.

==== Wycombe Wanderers (loan) ====
Breckin joined Wycombe Wanderers on a season-long loan in July 2023. On 5 August 2023, Breckin made his first senior appearance, starting for Wycombe in their 3–0 defeat to Exeter City at Adams Park. After making two league appearances, and nine appearances in total, he was recalled by Manchester City in January 2024. Wycombe manager Matt Bloomfield praised Breckin for his attitude at the club despite not playing as regularly as he would have wished. In January 2024, it was reported that Breckin began to train with Stockport County ahead of a possible loan move.

==== Crewe Alexandra (loan) ====
On 12 August 2024, Breckin joined League Two side Crewe Alexandra on a season-long loan, but was recalled by Manchester City on 21 January 2025 having made 18 appearances in all competitions, including 13 in the league.

=== Altrincham ===
On 3 February 2026, Breckin joined National League club Altrincham on an eighteen-month deal.

== Style of play ==
Described as "athletic, neat and tidy in possession, and intelligent in his use of the ball", Breckin has been compared with Belgian footballer Kevin De Bruyne for the way he "uses half space and activates the space behind the opposition fullbacks".

== Career statistics ==
As of match played 22 October 2025

Club	Season	League			FA Cup		EFL Cup		Europe		Other		Total	
Club	Season	Division	Apps	Goals	Apps	Goals	Apps	Goals	Apps	Goals	Apps	Goals	Apps	Goals
Manchester City	2022–23	—	—		—		—		—		0	0	0	0
Manchester City	2023–24	—	—		—		—		—		0	0	0	0
Wycombe Wanderers	2023–24	League One	2	0	1	0	1	0	-	-	-	-	4	0
Crewe Alexandra	2024–25	League Two	13	0	1	0	1	0	-	-	3	0	18	0
Career total			15	0	2	0	2	0	0	0	3	0	22	0
