= Matthew Benham =

British businessman (born 1968)

- Born: Matthew Alexander Benham; May 1968 (age 58)
- Education: Wadham College, University of Oxford
- Occupation: Businessman
- Organization: Smartodds
- Known for: Owner of Brentford F.C.

Matthew Alexander Benham (born May 1968) is a British businessman who is the owner of English Premier League club Brentford. He is also the founder and owner of Smartodds, a statistical research company for professional gamblers, and owner of Matchbook betting exchange. A graduate in Physics from Oxford University who worked in finance in the City of London, he is widely known for his unorthodox data analytics-driven approach to decision-making in football.

== Early life and education ==
Benham grew up in a family of cricket supporters in Eton, where his parents were teachers. A longtime fan of Brentford, Benham attended his first match in 1979 at the age of eleven. He attended Slough Grammar School, and enjoyed mathematics. In December 1982, at the age of 14, he skipped school with a friend to watch Brentford play an away game against Nottingham Forest. In 1989, he graduated from the University of Oxford with a degree in physics.

== Career ==
=== Banking and finance ===
In the 1990s, Benham worked for twelve years in the financial sector in the City of London, with stints as a hedge fund manager, a derivatives trader for Deutsche Bank, and as a vice president at the Bank of America.

=== Gambling ===
He entered the gambling industry in 2001, when Tony Bloom, who later became the owner of Brighton & Hove Albion, hired him to work at Premier Bet. Benham made a significant sum of money in the Asian betting market, using a statistical model developed by Stuart Coles and Mark Dixon at Lancaster University, which was able to predict the probabilities of football scores more accurately than the bookies. After falling out with Bloom, he founded Smartodds in 2004, and hired Coles. Based in Kentish Town in London, Smartodds focuses on statistical research and sports modelling, which it sells to professional gamblers. In 2011, he was part of a group of investors called Triplebet Limited, who became owners of sports betting exchange Matchbook.

=== Football ===
==== Investor in Brentford ====
Benham first made contact with his boyhood football club when he read a 2005 article in The Independent saying that supporters' trust Bees United, which had taken over running Brentford, were "desperately seeking a few wealthy supporters to invest", so they could buy out previous owner Ron Noades. He initially participated as an anonymous "mystery investor".

As Brentford continued to struggle financially, in 2007, Benham took the unusual move of paying out nearly £3 million to take over its loans, agreeing to hold them interest-free for five years. In 2009, Benham agreed to invest an additional £1 million a year for five years, in return for preference shares in the club. Bees United would then have the option to repay the loans to Benham and buy back his shares, while Benham held the option to take over the club as a majority owner.

==== Owner of Brentford ====
In June 2012, Bees United voted to transfer full control of Brentford to Benham, when the club was in the English third tier. Ten days after becoming the club's new owner, Benham purchased a parcel of land near Kew Bridge railway station, where he pledged to build a new stadium, close to its existing stadium at Griffin Park. In 2013, Benham promoted Mark Warburton, another former City trader, as manager. By the 2014–2015 season, Brentford had been promoted to the EFL Championship, for the first time in 21 years.

==== Majority shareholder of Midtjylland ====
In July 2014, Benham became the majority shareholder of FC Midtjylland (FCM), a club in the top-flight Danish Superliga, investing £6.2 million. From the start, Midtjylland fully embraced Benham's mandate for an analytics-driven approach to decision-making, using data analytics to identify promising yet undervalued transfers, improve team performance in set pieces, and optimize individual player fitness. According to Midtjylland chairman Rasmus Ankersen, Midtjylland also used analytics to understand "dangerous situations", and to inform coaches about performance against key performance indicators (KPIs), so they could speak more effectively to the players at half-time and to the media after matches. Benham first became interested in Ankersen after reading his book, The Gold Mine Effect, in which he admitted having failed to predict the success of Simon Kjær, when he was a young footballer at the academy Ankersen had helped to set up. Midtjylland went on to win their first league title in 2015, largely attributed to Benham's influence. On 15 August 2023, Midtjylland announced that Matthew Benham had sold his shares in the club.

==== Road to Premier League ====
Meanwhile, Brentford announced in February 2015 that it would part ways with Warburton at the end of the season. At the time, it was widely reported in the media that Warburton was unhappy with the fact that Benham wanted to run Brentford based on "mathematical modelling", and with his elimination of the manager's veto on new signings, with some reports suggesting that Benham went as far as insisting on long-ball tactics and hiring a set-piece coach. Brentford subsequently appointed two co-directors of football – Phil Giles, a former quantitative analyst at Smartodds, and Rasmus Ankersen from Midtjylland – when most clubs had none.

Ahead of the 2015–2016 season, Brentford began identifying undervalued talent by applying mathematics and statistics, using its limited budget to sign them, developing players with high potential, and selling them on to other clubs for a sizeable profit on transfers. This led to many comparisons with the statistically driven recruiting strategy pursued by the Oakland Athletics baseball team during its 2002 season, documented in the book Moneyball by Michael Lewis; Benham was compared to the Oakland A's general manager Billy Beane, portrayed by Brad Pitt in the 2011 film Moneyball. However, Benham dislikes the term and has stated, "The Moneyball label can be confusing because people think it is using any stats rather than trying to use them in a scientific way."

There were a few bumps along the way, including the hiring of Dutch manager Marinus Dijkhuizen as head coach, which Benham openly admitted was "a mistake" after Dijkhuizen was sacked after just nine games. Brentford fans were also initially apprehensive about the club's best players constantly being sold. In 2018, former Danish youth team coach Thomas Frank was promoted to head coach at Brentford, after Dean Smith left for Aston Villa; the team appeared to be on course for promotion to the Premier League in 2020, but lost to Fulham in the EFL Championship play-off final.

When season tickets went on sale for the new Brentford stadium, Benham instructed the club's commercial department not to "fleece the fans", and keep pricing affordable. In August 2020, the new 17,000-seat Brentford Community Stadium finally opened, but had to host its first matches there behind closed doors, due to the COVID-19 pandemic.

In 2021, Brentford won promotion to the Premier League, its first time in the top flight of English football in 74 years. Brentford's success, and the success of Midtjylland in winning three domestic championships, are widely viewed as validation of Benham's philosophy. Benham has rejected at least one offer to buy Brentford. Although he ranked as the least wealthy club owner in the Premier League, in March 2022, Benham had the highest approval rating in a survey of 10,500 Premier League fans conducted by Nick Harris.
