= John Breckin =

English footballer and manager

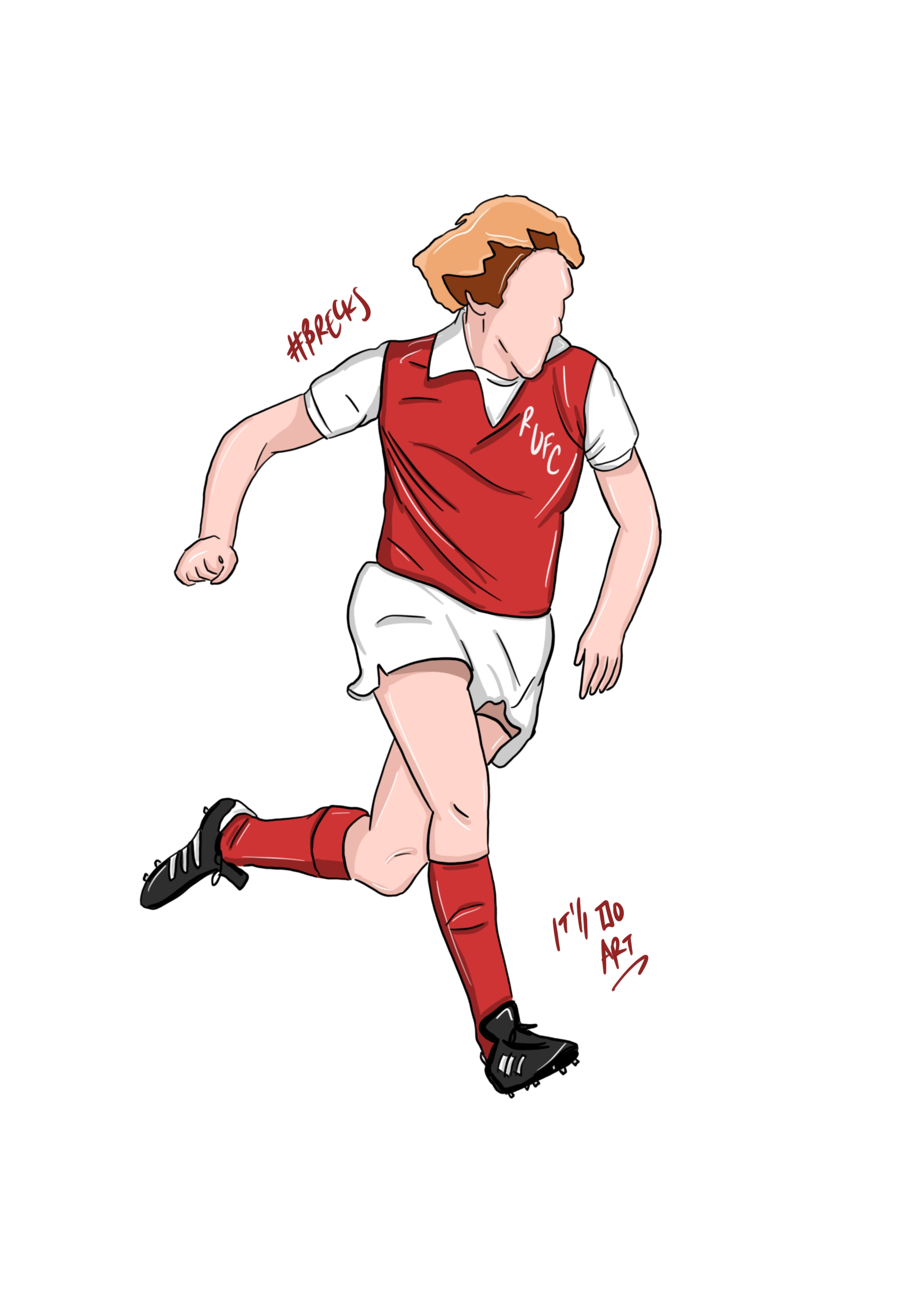

Personal information
- Full name: John Breckin
- Date of birth: 27 July 1953 (age 73)
- Place of birth: Sheffield, England
- Date of death: 5 ft 9 1/2 in (1.77 m)
- Position: Full back

Senior career*
Years	Team	Apps	(Gls)
1971–1983	Rotherham United	409	(8)
1972	→ Darlington (loan)	4	(0)
1983	Bury	17	(0)
1983–1984	Doncaster Rovers	18	(0)
1984–1985	Burton Albion		
Total		448	(8)

Managerial career
- 1987: Rotherham United
- * Club domestic league appearances and goals

John Breckin (born 27 July 1953) is an English former professional footballer who played as a left-back.

He is the uncle of Nottingham Forest defender, Ian Breckin and is also the great-uncle of Manchester City midfielder, Kian Breckin (who plays for Wycombe Wanderers on loan).

== Honours ==
Rotherham United

- Football League Third Division: 1980–81
