= Connor Evans (footballer, born 1997) =

Welsh footballer (born 1997)

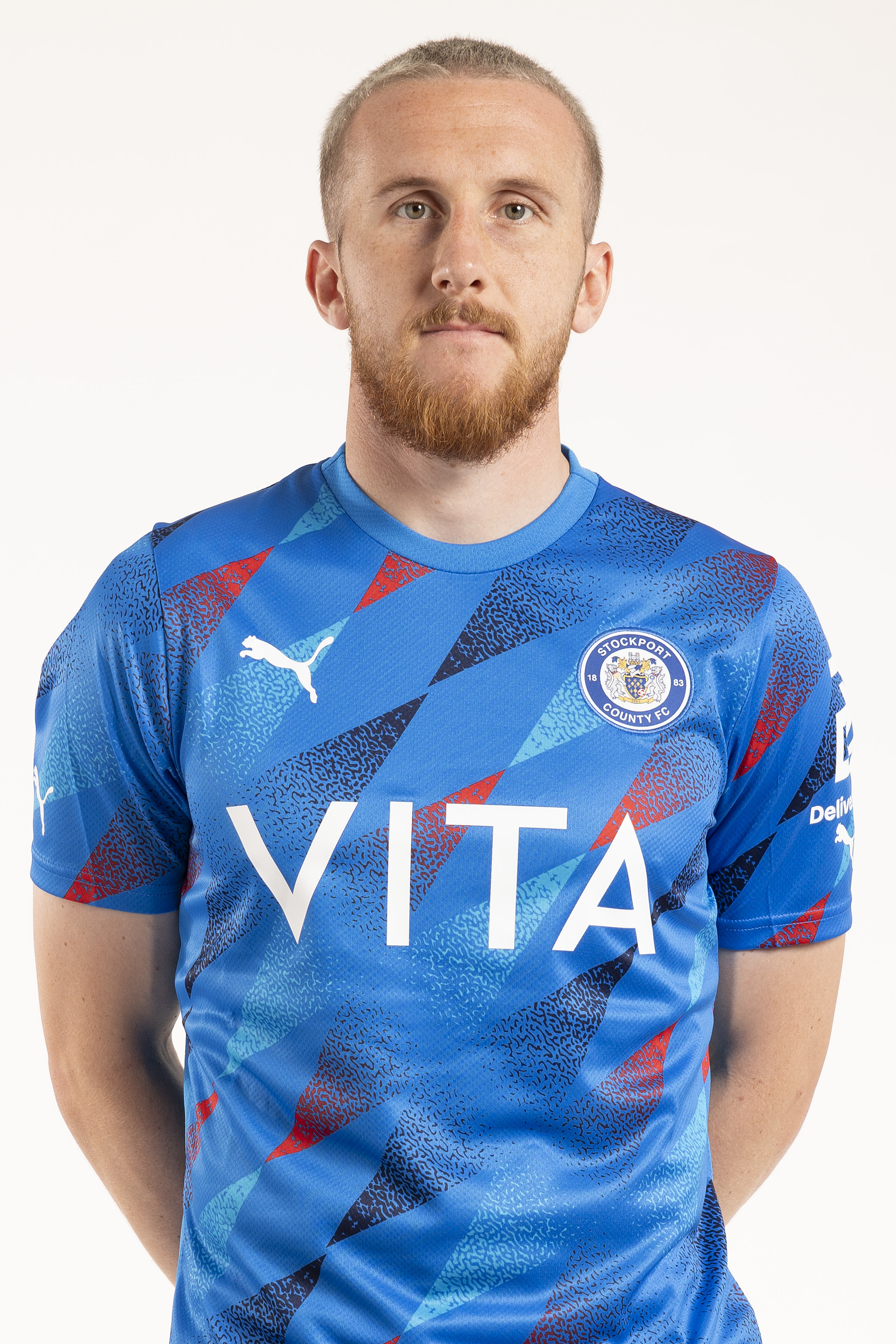

Personal information
- Full name: Connor Lemonheigh Evans
- Date of birth: 24 January 1997 (age 29)
- Place of birth: Swansea, Wales
- Height: 5 ft 10 in (1.79 m)
- Positions: Attacking midfielder; right-back; right wing-back

Team information
- Current team: Northampton Town
- Number: 24

Youth career
- –2012: Llanelli
- 2012–2015: Bristol City

Senior career*
Years	Team	Apps	(Gls)
2015–2020	Bristol City	0	(0)
2017	→ Bath City (loan)	9	(3)
2018-2020	→ Torquay United (loan)	67	(5)
2020–2022	Torquay United	81	(21)
2022–2024	Stockport County	44	(9)
2023	→ Notts County (loan)	5	(0)
2023–2024	→ AFC Wimbledon (loan)	14	(1)
2024–2026	Milton Keynes Dons	59	(3)
2026–	Northampton Town	9	(0)

International career
2012	Wales U16		
2013–2014	Wales U17	6	(1)
2015	Wales U18	1	(0)
2018	Wales U21	3	(2)
- * Club domestic league appearances and goals as of 18:00, 24 October 2026 (UTC)

Connor Lemonheigh Evans (born 24 January 1997) is a Welsh footballer who plays as an attacking midfielder or right wing-back for EFL League Two club Northampton Town Football Club.

A former Wales under-21 international, he started his career at Bristol City. His previous clubs including Stockport County, Torquay United, Notts County and AFC Wimbledon.

== Early career ==
Evans was born in Swansea.

== Club career ==
=== Bristol City ===
Having been with Bristol City since 2012, Evans signed a professional contract with the club in May 2016. He joined Bath City on loan in January 2017, making his debut in a 1–1 draw at home to Hampton & Richmond Borough on 7 January. He made three appearances for Bath, but returned to Bristol City after suffering an injury. He signed an extension to his contract in summer 2017.

On 28 July 2017, Evans joined Bath City on a two-month loan. He scored his first goal for the club in their first game of the season; a late penalty in a 5–2 home defeat to Chippenham Town. He scored three goals in 6 league matches for Bath City. In January 2018, Evans made his senior debut for Bristol City playing 90 minutes in the 3–0 loss at Watford in the FA Cup.

In January 2019, he signed a two-year contract extension with Bristol City, keeping him at the club until summer 2021.

=== Torquay United ===
On 31 January 2018, he joined National League side Torquay United on loan from Bristol City until the end of the season. He made his debut for Torquay United on 3 February 2018 as a 76th minute substitute in a 3–1 victory over Barrow. He scored his first goal for the club on 2 April 2018 with a 25-yard strike after 68 minutes in a 2–1 victory at home to Woking. Across the 2017–18 season, he appeared in 15 league matches, scoring once, as Torquay were relegated to the National League South.

On 29 September 2018, he returned to Torquay United on loan until January 2020. He extended his loan until the end of the season on 31 December 2018. He appeared in 30 league matches for Torquay, scoring three goals, as they were promoted back to the National League.

On 2 August 2019, he again returned to Torquay United on a loan deal until January 2020. In January 2020, his loan was extended to the end of the season. He appeared in 22 league matches, scoring once.

He joined Torquay United permanently for an undisclosed fee in August 2020.

=== Stockport County ===
On 14 June 2022, Evans joined newly promoted League Two club Stockport County on a two-year deal. On 23 February 2023, Evans returned to the National League with league leaders Notts County on loan until end of season.

In September 2023 he joined AFC Wimbledon on a season-long loan. He scored his first goal for Wimbledon against Walsall on 23 September 2023.

=== Milton Keynes Dons ===
On 24 May 2024, Evans agreed to join Milton Keynes Dons upon the expiration of his contract with Stockport County. On 1 October 2024, he scored his first goal for the club in a 5–1 away win over Harrogate Town.

With increased competition for places in his second season, Evans saw limited opportunities under new head coach Paul Warne, but achieved the third promotion of his career as the club finished in second place and returned to League One. He was one of nine players released at the end of the season.

== International career ==
Evans has represented Wales at youth and under 21 levels.

== Career statistics ==
As of match played 24 October 2026

Appearances and goals by club, season and competition
Club	Season	League			FA Cup		League Cup		Other		Total	
Club	Season	Division	Apps	Goals	Apps	Goals	Apps	Goals	Apps	Goals	Apps	Goals
Bristol City	2017–18	Championship	0	0	1	0	0	0	—		1	0
Bristol City	2018–19	Championship	0	0	0	0	0	0	—		0	0
Bristol City	2019–20	Championship	0	0	0	0	0	0	—		0	0
Bristol City	Total		0	0	1	0	0	0	0	0	1	0
Bath City (loan)	2016–17	National League South	3	0	0	0	—		0	0	3	0
Bath City (loan)	2017–18	National League South	6	3	—		—		0	0	6	3
Torquay United (loan)	2017–18	National League	15	1	—		—		0	0	15	1
Torquay United (loan)	2018–19	National League South	30	3	3	2	—		2 (Note: Appearance(s) in FA Trophy)	0	35	5
Torquay United (loan)	2019–20	National League	22	1	0	0	—		1	1	23	2
Torquay United	2020–21	National League	42	10	2	0	—		6 (Note: Four appearances and one goal in FA Trophy, two appearances in National League play-offs)	1	50	11
Torquay United	2021–22	National League	39	11	2	0	—		2	0	43	11
Torquay United	Total		148	26	7	2	—		11	2	166	30
Stockport County	2022–23	League Two	19	3	3	0	2	0	6 (Note: Three appearances in the EFL Trophy, three in the EFL League Two play-offs)	0	30	3
Stockport County	2023–24	League Two	22	6	0	0	1	0	1 (Note: Appearance in the EFL Trophy)	0	24	6
Stockport County	Total		41	9	3	0	3	0	7	0	54	9
Notts County (loan)	2022–23	National League	5	0	—		—		—		5	0
AFC Wimbledon (loan)	2023–24	League Two	14	1	3	2	0	0	0	0	17	3
Milton Keynes Dons	2024–25	League Two	34	2	1	0	0	0	2	0	37	2
Milton Keynes Dons	2025–26	League Two	25	1	1	0	1	0	0	0	27	1
Milton Keynes Dons	Total		59	3	2	0	1	0	2	0	64	3
Northampton Town	2026–27	League Two	9	0	0	0	1	0	1	0	11	0
Career total			267	36	16	4	5	0	20	2	309	42

== Honours ==
Torquay United

- National League South: 2018–19

Stockport County

- EFL League Two: 2023–24

Milton Keynes Dons

- EFL League Two runner-up: 2025–26

Individual

- National League Team of the Year: 2020–21
- Torquay United Player of the Year: 2020–21
