= Josh March =

English footballer (born 1997)

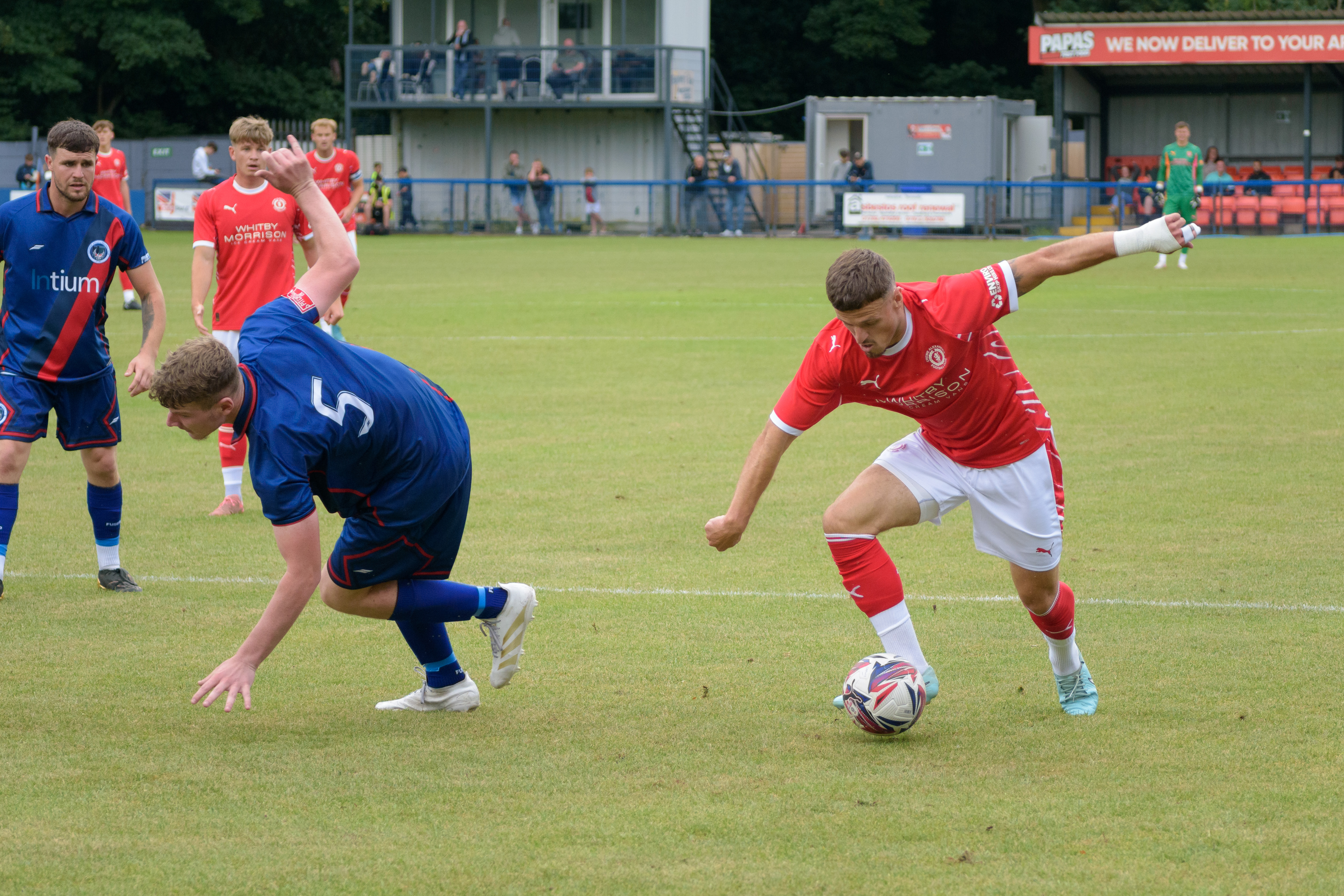
- March (right) playing for Crewe Alexandra in July 2025

Personal information
- Full name: Joshua Thomas March
- Date of birth: 18 March 1997 (age 29)
- Place of birth: Stourbridge, England
- Height: 5 ft 9 in (1.75 m)
- Position: Striker

Team information
- Current team: Crewe Alexandra
- Number: 9

Senior career*
Years	Team	Apps	(Gls)
2015–2019	Alvechurch	149	(66)
2019–2020	Leamington	21	(16)
2020–2023	Forest Green Rovers	75	(11)
2021	→ Harrogate Town (loan)	14	(5)
2023	Stevenage	13	(2)
2023–2025	Harrogate Town	63	(10)
2025–	Crewe Alexandra	56	(14)
- * Club domestic league appearances and goals as of 16:26, 21 November 2026 (UTC)

Joshua Thomas March (born 18 March 1997) is an English professional footballer who plays as a striker for EFL League Two club Crewe Alexandra.

== Career ==
=== Early career ===
Born in Stourbridge, March began his career with Alvechurch, becoming the club's first contracted player in a decade in May 2017, and scoring 81 goals in 184 matches, being described as "an integral part in [the club's] rise from the Midland Alliance to the Southern Premier". He then played for Leamington for the 2019–20 season, scoring 24 goals in 27 games, before signing for League Two side Forest Green Rovers in January 2020. He missed the start of the 2020–21 season due to a thigh injury.

On 5 January 2021, March joined League Two side Harrogate Town on loan until the end of the 2020–21 season. His loan ended on 11 March 2021 after he suffered an injury in a match.

He signed for Stevenage in January 2023. Following promotion to League One, March signed a new contract with the club in May 2023.

On 1 September 2023, March returned to League Two and to Harrogate Town for an undisclosed fee.

=== Crewe Alexandra ===
On 22 May 2025, March agreed to join fellow League Two side Crewe Alexandra on a two-year deal from 1 July upon the expiration of his Harrogate Town contract. He made his debut in the side's 3–1 opening day win at Salford City on 2 August 2025, and scored his first Crewe goal in the side's 4–1 victory at Fleetwood Town on 19 August 2025.

After 11 goals in 40 league appearances in his first season, in June 2026 he agreed a one-year extension to his contract, committing himself to Crewe until the summer of 2028. He started Crewe's 2026–2027 season with two goals in two matches, and was nominated for the League Two Player of the Month award for August.

== Career statistics ==
As of match played 21 November 2026

Appearances and goals by club, season and competition
Club	Season	League			FA Cup		League Cup		Other		Total	
Club	Season	Division	Apps	Goals	Apps	Goals	Apps	Goals	Apps	Goals	Apps	Goals
Alvechurch	2015–16	MFL Premier Division	38	11	0	0	0	0	15	5	53	16
Alvechurch	2016–17	MFL Premier Division	34	31	0	0	0	0	10	5	44	36
Alvechurch	2017–18	NPL Division One South	37	12	0	0	0	0	1	0	38	12
Alvechurch	2018–19	SFL Premier Central	40	12	0	0	0	0	9	5	49	17
Alvechurch	Total		149	66	0	0	0	0	35	15	184	81
Leamington	2019–20	National League North	21	16	3	2	0	0	3 (Note: One appearance and three goals in the FA Trophy; two appearances and three goals in the Birmingham Senior Cup.)	6	27	24
Forest Green Rovers	2019–20	League Two	10	2	0	0	0	0	0	0	10	2
Forest Green Rovers	2020–21	League Two	4	0	1	0	0	0	2 (Note: Appearances in the EFL Trophy.)	0	7	0
Forest Green Rovers	2021–22	League Two	35	5	1	0	1	0	3	1	40	6
Forest Green Rovers	2022–23	League One	26	4	3	1	2	0	2	1	33	6
Forest Green Rovers	Total		75	11	5	1	3	0	7	2	90	13
Harrogate Town (loan)	2020–21	League Two	14	5	0	0	0	0	0	0	14	5
Stevenage	2022–23	League Two	9	2	0	0	0	0	0	0	9	2
Stevenage	2023–24	League One	4	0	0	0	1	1	0	0	5	1
Stevenage	Total		13	2	0	0	1	1	0	0	14	3
Harrogate Town	2023–24	League Two	29	1	2	0	0	0	0	0	31	1
Harrogate Town	2024–25	League Two	34	9	3	0	1	0	3	0	41	9
Harrogate Town	Total		63	10	5	0	1	0	3	0	72	10
Crewe Alexandra	2025–26	League Two	40	11	0	0	0	0	1	0	41	11
Crewe Alexandra	2026–27	League Two	16	3	1	0	1	0	0	0	18	3
Crewe Alexandra	Total		56	14	1	0	1	0	1	0	59	14
Career total			391	123	14	3	6	1	49	23	470	151

== Honours ==
Forest Green Rovers

- EFL League Two: 2021–22
