= Charlie McNeill (footballer) =

English footballer

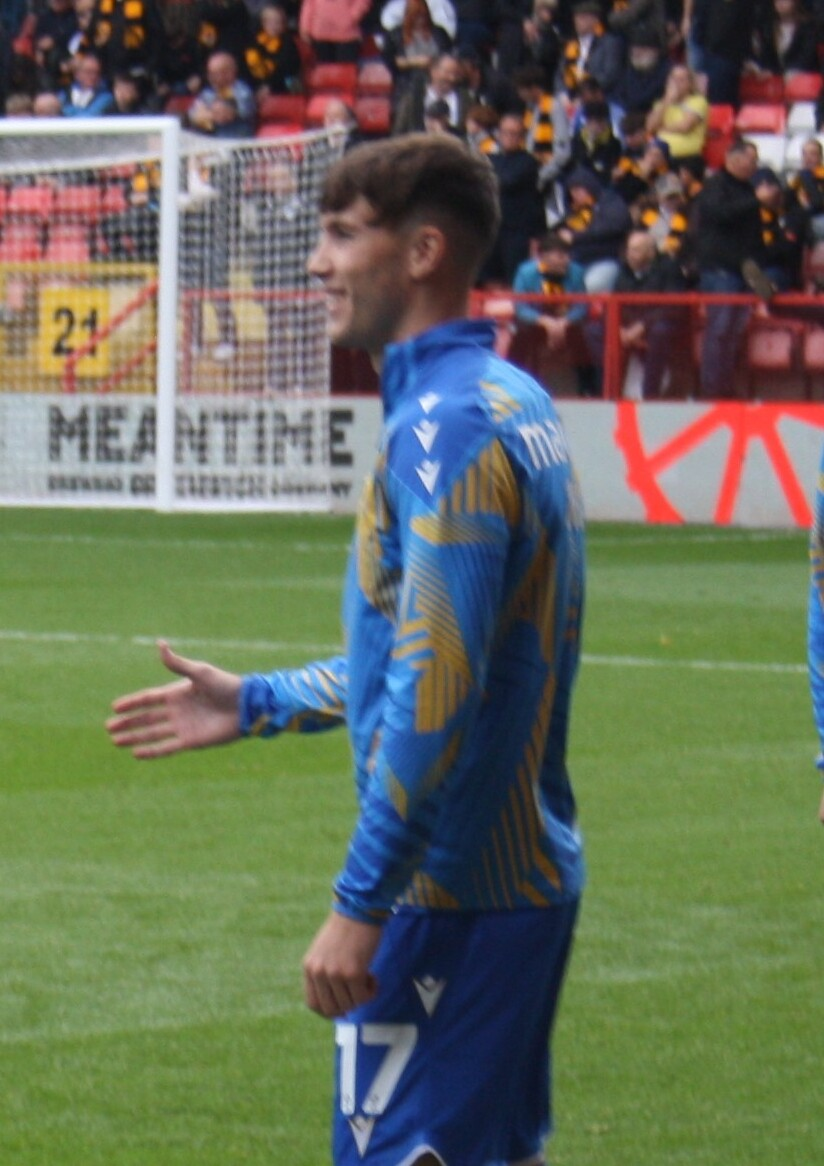
- McNeill in 2025

Personal information
- Full name: Charlie Martin McNeill
- Date of birth: 9 September 2003 (age 23)
- Place of birth: Droylsden, England
- Height: 1.81 m (5 ft 11 in)
- Position: Forward

Team information
- Current team: Crewe Alexandra (on loan from Sheffield Wednesday)
- Number: 23

Youth career
- –2011: Liverpool
- 2011–2014: Manchester United
- 2014–2020: Manchester City
- 2020–2022: Manchester United

Senior career*
Years	Team	Apps	(Gls)
2022–2024	Manchester United	0	(0)
2023	→ Newport County (loan)	20	(2)
2023–2024	→ Stevenage (loan)	3	(1)
2024–	Sheffield Wednesday	44	(4)
2026–	→ Crewe Alexandra (loan)	15	(3)

International career
2019	England U16	4	(1)
- * Club domestic league appearances and goals as of 14:32, 21 November 2026 (UTC)

Charlie Martin McNeill (born 9 September 2003) is an English professional footballer who plays as a forward for EFL League Two club Crewe Alexandra on loan from EFL League One club Sheffield Wednesday.

== Club career ==
=== Early career ===
Born in Droylsden, McNeill started his career with Manchester United, who he supported growing up, before leaving for city rivals Manchester City in 2014. McNeill scored over 600 goals at youth level.

=== Manchester United ===
In 2020, Manchester United agreed a deal for McNeill worth a reported £750,000. He continued his prolific form that made him a highly regarded prospect at Manchester City, scoring 24 goals in 21 games in his first season with the United U18 squad.

He made his debut for United's first team as a substitute in the UEFA Europa League match against Real Sociedad on 8 September 2022, the day before his 19th birthday.

On 5 June 2024, Manchester United announced he was leaving the club to seek opportunities elsewhere.

==== Newport County (loan) ====
On 31 January 2023, McNeill signed for League Two club Newport County on loan until the end of the 2022–23 season. He made his Newport debut in the starting line-up for the League Two 2–1 win against Swindon Town on 4 February 2023. He scored his first goal for Newport in the 3–1 League Two win against Tranmere Rovers on 18 March 2023.

==== Stevenage (loan) ====
In September 2023, McNeil joined EFL League One club Stevenage on loan for the remainder of the 2023–24 season. Having struggled for gametime, he returned to his parent club on 3 January 2024.

=== Sheffield Wednesday ===
On 10 July 2024, McNeill joined Sheffield Wednesday on a free transfer. He made his debut in the EFL Cup against Hull City on 14 August 2024, scoring a brace, with the first after 27 seconds. On 21 December 2024, he made his league debut coming off the bench against Stoke City. His first league goals came in November 2025, where he scored a brace against Preston North End, where he also saw his penalty saved, for a chance to score a hattrick.

==== Crewe Alexandra (loan) ====
On 13 August 2026, McNeill joined League Two club Crewe Alexandra on loan for the duration of the 2026–27 season. He made his debut the following day on the opening day of the League Two season, where he came off the bench in 1–0 win against Crawley Town. His first goal was a penalty against Blackpool in the EFL Trophy which took the game penalties. His first league goal came in a 5–1 defeat against Chesterfield on 24 October. Two weeks later, on 7 November 2026, he scored from the halfway line to open the scoring in Crewe's 2–1 FA Cup first round win over AFC Wimbledon at Gresty Road.

== Personal life ==
McNeill was born in England, and is of part Irish descent through a grandfather.

== Career statistics ==
As of 21 November 2026

Appearances and goals by club, season and competition
Club	Season	League			FA Cup		League Cup		Europe		Other		Total	
Club	Season	Division	Apps	Goals	Apps	Goals	Apps	Goals	Apps	Goals	Apps	Goals	Apps	Goals
Manchester United U21	2021–22	—	—		—		—		—		2 (Note: Appearance(s) in the EFL Trophy)	1	2	1
Manchester United U21	2022–23	—	—		—		—		—		5	3	5	3
Manchester United U21	2023–24	—	—		—		—		—		1	0	1	0
Manchester United U21	Total		—		—		—		—		8	4	8	4
Manchester United	2022–23	Premier League	0	0	0	0	0	0	1 (Note: Appearance in the UEFA Europa League)	0	—		1	0
Newport County (loan)	2022–23	League Two	20	2	—		—		—		—		20	2
Stevenage (loan)	2023–24	League One	3	1	0	0	—		—		—		3	1
Sheffield Wednesday	2024–25	Championship	4	0	0	0	3	2	—		—		7	2
Sheffield Wednesday	2025–26	Championship	40	4	1	0	2	0	—		—		43	4
Sheffield Wednesday	2026–27	League One	0	0	0	0	0	0	—		—		0	0
Sheffield Wednesday	Total		44	4	1	0	5	2	—		0	0	50	6
Crewe Alexandra (loan)	2026–27	League Two	15	3	1	1	1	0	—		2	1	19	5
Career total			82	10	2	1	6	2	1	0	10	5	101	18

== Honours ==
Manchester United U18

- FA Youth Cup: 2021–22
