= 2024–25 Milton Keynes Dons F.C. season =

21st season in existence of Milton Keynes Dons FC

Milton Keynes Dons
2024–25 season
- Chairman: Pete Winkelman (until 9 August); Fahad Al-Ghanim (from 9 August)
- Head Coach: Mike Williamson (until 19 September); Dean Lewington (interim, from 19 Sep until 25 Sep); Scott Lindsey (from 25 September to 2 March); Ben Gladwin (interim, from 3 March to 15 April); Paul Warne (from 15 April)
- Stadium: Stadium MK
- League Two: 19th
- FA Cup: First round (eliminated by AFC Wimbledon)
- EFL Cup: First round (eliminated by Watford)
- EFL Trophy: Group stage
- Top goalscorer: League: Alex Gilbey (11); All: Alex Gilbey (11)
- Highest home attendance: 10,419 vs AFC Wimbledon (3 November 2024, FA Cup R1)
- Lowest home attendance: 1,127 vs Leyton Orient (12 November 2024, EFL Trophy GS)
- Average home league attendance: 7,025
- Biggest win: 5–1 vs Harrogate Town (A) (1 October 2024, League Two)
- Biggest defeat: 5–0 vs Watford (A) (13 August 2024, EFL Cup R1)
Home colours	Away colours	Third colours
- All statistics correct as of 3 May 2025.

The 2024–25 season was the 21st season in the history of Milton Keynes Dons Football Club and their second consecutive season in League Two. In addition to the domestic league, the club will also participate in the FA Cup, the EFL Cup and the EFL Trophy.

The season covers the period from 1 July 2024 to 30 June 2025.

== Ownership changes ==
On 9 August 2024, it was announced that a Kuwait-based consortium, led by Fahad Al Ghanim, had taken over ownership of the club from previous chairman Pete Winkelman.

== Managerial changes ==
On 19 September 2024, it was announced that head coach Mike Williamson had left the club to take up the vacant managerial position at fellow League Two side Carlisle United. Club captain Dean Lewington was placed in charge of the team on an interim basis.

On 25 September 2024, Scott Lindsey was announced as the club's new Head Coach. He was most recently the manager of League One side Crawley Town.
However, on 2 March 2025, Lindsey was sacked after a run of six league games without a win after just five months in charge. The following day, former MK Dons midfielder Ben Gladwin, a current First Team Coach, was named as interim Head Coach.

On 15 April 2025, Paul Warne was announced as the club's new Head Coach. He was most recently the manager of EFL Championship side Derby County.

== Transfers ==
=== In ===
Date	Pos	Player	From	Fee	Ref
18 June 2024	CM	Tommy Leigh (ENG)	Accrington Stanley (ENG)	Undisclosed	
1 July 2024 (Note: The transfer was announced on 24 May, and would become official on July 1 once his Stockport County contract expired)	AM	Connor Lemonheigh-Evans (WAL)	Stockport County (ENG)	Free	
1 July 2024 (Note: The transfer was announced on 6 June, and would become official on July 1 once his Chesterfield contract expired)	CB	Laurence Maguire (ENG)	Chesterfield (ENG)	Free	
1 July 2024 (Note: The transfer was announced on 29 May, and would become official on July 1 once his Crewe Alexandra contract expired)	CB	Luke Offord (ENG)	Crewe Alexandra (ENG)	Free	
1 July 2024 (Note: The transfer was announced on 28 June, and would become official on July 1 once his Accrington Stanley contract expired)	CM	Joe Pritchard (ENG)	Accrington Stanley (ENG)	Free	
1 July 2024 (Note: The transfer was announced on 21 June, and would become official on July 1 once his Northampton Town contract expired)	CB	Sam Sherring (ENG)	Northampton Town (ENG)	Free	
4 July 2024	CM	Liam Kelly (IRL)	Crawley Town (ENG)	Undisclosed	
5 July 2024	CM	Tom Carroll (ENG)	Exeter City (ENG)	Free	
12 July 2024	CF	Callum Hendry (SCO)	Salford City (ENG)	Undisclosed	
9 August 2024	RW	Aaron Nemane (FRA)	Notts County (ENG)	Undisclosed	
30 August 2024	CM	Kane Thompson-Sommers (ENG)	FC Halifax Town (ENG)	Undisclosed	
4 October 2024	CF	Scott Hogan (IRL)	Free agent	Free	
9 January 2025	DM	Jay Williams (SKN)	Crawley Town (ENG)	Undisclosed	
14 January 2025	AM	Daniel Crowley (ENG)	Notts County (ENG)	Undisclosed	
24 January 2025	CB	Nathan Thompson (ENG)	Stevenage (ENG)	Undisclosed	
31 January 2025	CB	Jack Sanders (ENG)	St Johnstone (SCO)	Undisclosed	
3 February 2025	GK	Connal Trueman (ENG)	Millwall (ENG)	Undisclosed	

=== Out ===
Date	Pos	Player	To	Fee	Ref
3 July 2024	LB	Daniel Harvie (SCO)	Wycombe Wanderers (ENG)	Undisclosed	
12 July 2024	CF	Max Dean (ENG)	KAA Gent (BEL)	€2,000,000	
15 July 2024	CM	Dawson Devoy (IRL)	Bohemian (IRL)	Undisclosed	
9 August 2024	CM	Conor Grant (IRL)	Notts County (ENG)	Undisclosed	
10 January 2025	CM	Tommy Leigh (ENG)	Bradford City (ENG)	Undisclosed	
13 January 2025	AM	Stephen Wearne (ENG)	Carlisle United (ENG)	Undisclosed	
14 January 2025	LM	Brooklyn Ilunga (ENG)	Bromley (ENG)	Undisclosed	
23 January 2025	DM	MJ Williams (WAL)	Barrow (ENG)	Undisclosed	
26 January 2025	RM	Darragh Burns (IRL)	Grimsby Town (ENG)	Undisclosed	

=== Loaned in ===
Date	Pos	Player	From	Date until	Ref
24 July 2024	GK	Tom McGill (CAN)	Brighton & Hove Albion (ENG)	3 February 2025 (Note: On 3 February, McGill was recalled to Brighton)	
2 August 2024	CB	Nico Lawrence (ENG)	Southampton (ENG)	End of Season	
30 August 2024	CF	Sonny Finch (ENG)	Middlesbrough (ENG)	2 January 2025 (Note: On 2 January, Finch was recalled to Middlesbrough)	
30 August 2024	AM	Joe White (ENG)	Newcastle United (ENG)	End of Season	
16 January 2025	AM	Tommi O'Reilly (ENG)	Aston Villa (ENG)	End of Season	
3 February 2025	LB	Travis Patterson (ENG)	Aston Villa (ENG)	End of Season	
4 February 2025	CF	Danilo Orsi (ENG)	Burton Albion (ENG)	End of Season	

=== Loaned out ===
Date	Pos.	Player	To	Date until	Ref.
1 August 2024	CB	Charlie Waller (ENG)	Sutton United (ENG)	2 January 2025	
7 August 2024	CM	Keon Lewis-Burgess (ENG)	Banbury United (ENG)	8 September 2024	
16 August 2024	GK	Seb Stacey (ENG)	Potters Bar Town (ENG)	16 September 2024	
16 August 2024	RB	Albert Wood (ENG)	Potters Bar Town (ENG)	16 September 2024	
21 August 2024	RB	Phoenix Scholtz (NIR)	AFC Dunstable (ENG)	18 September 2024	
26 September 2024	GK	Seb Stacey (ENG)	AFC Dunstable (ENG)	31 October 2024	
30 October 2024	CF	Matthew Dennis (ENG)	Rochdale (ENG)	2 January 2025	
15 November 2024	GK	Seb Stacey (ENG)	Hitchin Town (ENG)	13 December 2024	
15 November 2024	GK	Nathan Harness (ENG)	Wealdstone (ENG)	13 December 2024	
15 November 2024	CM	Keon Lewis-Burgess (ENG)	AFC Dunstable (ENG)	TBA	
15 November 2024	RB	Albert Wood (ENG)	AFC Dunstable (ENG)	TBA	
16 November 2024	CF	Chase Medwynter (ENG)	Banbury United (ENG)	15 December 2024	
19 November 2024	CB	Charlie Stirland (ENG)	Oxford City (ENG)	17 December 2024	
15 January 2025	GK	Nathan Harness (ENG)	Southend United (ENG)	12 February 2025	
21 January 2025	RM	Callum Tripp (ENG)	Gateshead (ENG)	24 February 2025	
23 January 2025	CB	Jack Tucker (ENG)	Colchester United (ENG)	End of Season	
3 February 2025	CF	Ellis Harrison (WAL)	Walsall (ENG)	End of Season	
21 February 2025	CB	Charlie Stirland (ENG)	Darlington (ENG)	End of Season (Note: On 28 March, Stirland's loan at Darlington was extended until the end of season)	

=== Released / Out of Contract ===
Date	Pos	Player	Subsequent club	Join date	Ref
30 June 2024	GK	Michael Kelly (IRL)	Accrington Stanley (ENG)	1 July 2024	
30 June 2024	RW	Dan Kemp (ENG)	Stevenage (ENG)	1 July 2024	
30 June 2024	RB	Cameron Norman (ENG)	Tranmere Rovers (ENG)	1 July 2024	
30 June 2024	CB	Warren O'Hora (IRL)	Hibernian (SCO)	1 July 2024	
30 June 2024	CM	Ethan Robson (ENG)	Carlisle United (ENG)	1 July 2024	
30 June 2024	CF	Mohamed Eisa (SUD)	Nassaji Mazandaran (IRN)	18 September 2024	
3 February 2025	CM	Joe Pritchard (ENG)	Oldham Athletic (ENG)	4 February 2025	
3 February 2025	CF	Matthew Dennis (ENG)	Carlisle United (ENG)	11 February 2025	
3 February 2025	CM	Tom Carroll (ENG)	Reading (ENG)	3 March 2025	

== Pre-season and friendlies ==
The club's full pre-season schedule was announced on 5 June 2024. They began with three away friendlies against non league opposition, facing Barnet, Chelmsford City and Wealdstone. The club then played two home friendlies, hosting EFL Championship sides Portsmouth and Plymouth Argyle at Stadium MK.

For the second consecutive season, the club travelled to Germany for pre-season training and also played a friendly against local opposition, taking on 3. Liga side Hannover 96 II.

Win Draw Loss Fixtures

12 July 2024 Friendly	Barnet	2–1	Milton Keynes Dons	Dunstable
19:45 BST	Wilkinson 66'; Clifford 77'	Report	Dennis 61'	Stadium: Creasey Park

20 July 2024 Friendly	Hannover 96 II	1–4	Milton Keynes Dons	Hanover, Germany
14:00 BST	31' (pen.)	Report	Dennis 57', 77' (pen.); Sherring 64'; Waller 90'	Stadium: Eilenriedestadion; Attendance: Behind closed doors

24 July 2024 Friendly	Chelmsford City	0–1	Milton Keynes Dons	Chelmsford
19:45 BST		Report	Dennis 49'	Stadium: Melbourne Community Stadium; Attendance: 259

27 July 2024 Friendly	Wealdstone	1–3	Milton Keynes Dons	London (Ruislip)
15:00 BST	Boldewijn 68'	Report	Wearne 12'; Tomlinson 16'; Dennis 81'	Stadium: Grosvenor Vale; Attendance: 434

30 July 2024 Friendly	Milton Keynes Dons	1–1	Portsmouth	Denbigh
19:30 BST	Leigh 61'	Report	Murphy 3'	Stadium: Stadium MK; Attendance: 2,317 (647 away)

3 August 2024 Friendly	Milton Keynes Dons	0–1	Plymouth Argyle	Denbigh
15:00 BST		Report	Hardie 69'	Stadium: Stadium MK; Attendance: 2,682 (601 away)

== Competitions ==
=== Overall record ===
Competition	First match	Last match	Starting round	Final position	Record							
Competition	First match	Last match	Starting round	Final position	Pld	W	D	L	GF	GA	GD	Win %
League Two	10 August 2024	3 May 2025	Matchday 1	19th	46	14	10	22	52	66	−14	30.43
FA Cup	3 November 2024		First round	First round	1	0	0	1	0	2	−2	0.00
EFL Cup	13 August 2024		First round	First round	1	0	0	1	0	5	−5	0.00
EFL Trophy	17 September 2024	12 November 2024	Group stage	Group stage	3	0	1	2	4	7	−3	0.00
Total					51	14	11	26	56	80	−24	27.45

Last updated: 3 May 2025
Source: Soccerway

=== EFL League Two ===
==== League table ====
Pos	Team	Pld	W	D	L	GF	GA	GD	Pts
17	Gillingham	46	14	16	16	41	46	−5	58
18	Harrogate Town	46	14	11	21	43	61	−18	53
19	Milton Keynes Dons	46	14	10	22	52	66	−14	52
20	Tranmere Rovers	46	12	15	19	45	65	−20	51
21	Accrington Stanley	46	12	14	20	53	69	−16	50

Source: EFL Official Website
Rules for classification: 1) Points; 2) Goal difference; 3) Number of goals scored; 4) Head-to-head results; 5) Wins; 6) Away goals; 7) Penalty points (sec 9.5); 8) 12-point sending off offences

==== Results summary ====
Overall								Home						Away					
Pld	W	D	L	GF	GA	GD	Pts	W	D	L	GF	GA	GD	W	D	L	GF	GA	GD
46	14	10	22	52	66	−14	52	8	6	9	25	25	0	6	4	13	27	41	−14

Last updated: 3 May 2025.
Source: Soccerway

==== Results by round ====
Round	1	2	3	4	5	6	7	8	9	10	11	12	13	14	15	16	18	20	21	22	23	24	25	27	17^{1}	28	29	30	31	19^{2}	32	33	34	35	36	37	38	26^{3}	39	40	41	42	43	44	45	46
Ground	H	A	H	A	H	A	H	A	A	H	H	A	H	A	H	H	H	H	A	H	H	A	H	A	A	H	H	A	H	A	A	A	H	A	H	A	A	A	H	A	H	A	H	A	H	A
Result	L	L	W	L	W	L	D	D	W	D	L	W	W	W	W	W	W	L	L	L	D	W	L	L	L	D	W	L	L	L	D	L	L	L	W	L	W	D	L	L	L	L	D	W	D	D
Position	16	23	15	19	14	20	19	19	14	13	15	13	12	8	6	5	3	8	9	11	11	11	12	12	12	12	11	11	14	15	16	17	17	18	18	18	18	17	17	18	19	19	19	18	18	19
Points	0	0	3	3	6	6	7	8	11	12	12	15	18	21	24	27	30	30	30	30	31	34	34	34	34	35	38	38	38	38	39	39	39	39	42	42	45	46	46	46	46	46	47	50	51	52

Updated to match(es) played on 3 May 2025. Source: Soccerway
A = Away; H = Home; W = Win; D = Draw; L = Loss; P = Postponed
Notes:
- ^{1} Matchday 17 (vs. Fleetwood Town) was postponed due to poor conditions caused by Storm Bert.
- ^{2} Matchday 19 (vs. Barrow) was postponed due to poor conditions caused by Storm Darragh.
- ^{3} Matchday 26 (vs. Carlisle United) was postponed due to a frozen pitch.

==== Matches ====
On 26 June, the League Two fixtures were announced. The club will begin the season at home to Bradford City on 10 August with the final game of the regular season being away at Swindon Town on 3 May.

Win Draw Loss Fixtures

10 August 2024 1	Milton Keynes Dons	1–2	Bradford City	Denbigh
15:00 BST	Offord (yellow card) 6'; Gilbey 20'	Report	Pattison 3'; Sherring 5' (o.g.)	Stadium: Stadium MK; Attendance: 7,561 (1,726 away); Referee: Tom Reeves
Note: Fixture live on Sky Sports.

17 August 2024 2	Colchester United	2–0	Milton Keynes Dons	Colchester
15:00 BST	Flanagan (yellow card) 69'; Read 81'; Tovide (yellow card) 84'; Payne 90+4'	Report	Offord (yellow card) 15'; Tucker (yellow card) 27'; Gilbey (yellow card) 75'	Stadium: JobServe Community Stadium; Attendance: 4,521 (494 away); Referee: Jacob Miles

24 August 2024 3	Milton Keynes Dons	3–0	Carlisle United	Denbigh
15:00 BST	Hendry 18'; Gilbey 31'; Wearne (yellow card) 38'; Nemane (yellow card) 75'; Tomlinson 90+2'; Tripp (yellow card) 90+8'	Report		Stadium: Stadium MK; Attendance: 6,399 (734 away); Referee: Farai Hallam

2 September 2024 4	Salford City	1–0	Milton Keynes Dons	Salford
20:00 BST	Okoronkwo 42'; Edwards (yellow card) 60'	Report		Stadium: Peninsula Stadium; Attendance: 2,227 (231 away); Referee: Ben Speedie
Note: Fixture was originally scheduled for 31 August at 15:00, but was moved for live Sky Sports coverage.

7 September 2024 5	Milton Keynes Dons	1–0	Walsall	Denbigh
15:00 BST	Hendry 18', (yellow card) 68'		Weir (yellow card) 13'; Jellis (yellow card) 63'	Stadium: Stadium MK; Attendance: 6,547 (813 away); Referee: James Oldham

14 September 2024 6	AFC Wimbledon	3–0	Milton Keynes Dons	London (Wimbledon)
12:30 BST	Hippolyte 11'; Maycock 90', 90+7'			Stadium: The Cherry Red Records Stadium; Attendance: 7,921 (705 away); Referee: Darren Drysdale
Note: Fixture was originally given a 15:00 kick-off, but was brought forward to 12:30 for live Sky Sports coverage.

21 September 2024 7	Milton Keynes Dons	1–1	Doncaster Rovers	Denbigh
15:00 BST	Harrison 34', (red card) 52'; Nemane (yellow card) 36'; Gilbey (yellow card) 90+3'	Report	Clifton (yellow card) 3' (yellow-red card) 10'; Yeboah (yellow card) 66'; Anderson 82'	Stadium: Stadium MK; Attendance: 7,838 (1,065 away); Referee: Simon Mather

28 September 2024 8	Bromley	1–1	Milton Keynes Dons	London (Bromley)
15:00 BST	Cheek 23'; Grant (yellow card) 45+2'	Report	Tomlinson 8'; Leigh (yellow card) 53'	Stadium: Hayes Lane; Attendance: 3,522 (420 away); Referee: Lee Swabey

1 October 2024 9	Harrogate Town	1–5	Milton Keynes Dons	Harrogate
19:45 BST	Offord 73' (o.g.)	Report	Leigh 35'; White 45+2'; Gilbey 45+4'; Lemonheigh-Evans 88'; Finch 90'	Stadium: Exercise Stadium; Attendance: 1,694 (138 away); Referee: Aaron Bannister

5 October 2024 10	Milton Keynes Dons	1–1	Tranmere Rovers	Denbigh
15:00 BST	White 23'; Lemonheigh-Evans (yellow card) 33'; Nemane (yellow card) 59'		Patrick (yellow card) 68'; Hendry 90+1'	Stadium: Stadium MK; Attendance: 6,047 (452 away); Referee: Craig Hicks

12 October 2024 11	Milton Keynes Dons	0–1	Port Vale	Denbigh
15:00 BST	Maguire (yellow card) 70'	Report	Debrah (yellow card) 36'; Hackford 77'; Richards (yellow card) 89'; Stockley (yellow card) 90+3'	Stadium: Stadium MK; Attendance: 6,855 (1,050 away); Referee: David Rock

19 October 2024 12	Morecambe	1–3	Milton Keynes Dons	Morecambe
15:00 BST	Stott 44'	Report	Tomlinson 2' (pen.); Maguire (yellow card) 7'; Hogan 22'; Kelly 49'; Offord (yellow card) 69'; Williams (yellow card) 79'	Stadium: Mazuma Mobile Stadium; Attendance: 3,448 (250 away); Referee: Will Finnie

22 October 2024 13	Milton Keynes Dons	2–1	Accrington Stanley	Denbigh
19:45 BST	Gilbey 1', (yellow card) 43'; Tomlinson 58', (yellow card) 72'; Lewington (yellow card) 73'; Offord (yellow card) 86'	Report	Whalley (yellow card) 35'; Coyle (yellow card) 52'; Woods 67'; Batty (yellow card) 72'; Love (yellow card) 81'; Rawson (yellow card) 82'; Hunter (yellow card) 90+3'	Stadium: Stadium MK; Attendance: 5,084 (79 away); Referee: Ross Martin

26 October 2024 14	Grimsby Town	1–3	Milton Keynes Dons	Cleethorpes
15:00 BST	Rose 16'; Warren (yellow card) 88'; Hume (yellow card) 90+2'	Report	Gilbey 49', (yellow card) 65'; Hogan 53'; Lemonheigh-Evans (yellow card) 90+1', (goal) 90+5'; Harrison (yellow card) 90+4'	Stadium: Blundell Park; Attendance: 5,853 (303 away); Referee: Scott Oldham

9 November 2024 15	Milton Keynes Dons	3–1	Swindon Town	Denbigh
15:00 GMT	Thompson-Sommers 45+4'; Williams 57'; Gilbey 64'; Hendry (yellow card) 86'	Report	Smith 1', (yellow card) 62'	Stadium: Stadium MK; Attendance: 7,407 (1,242 away); Referee: Sunny Singh Gill

16 November 2024 16	Milton Keynes Dons	3–2	Cheltenham Town	Denbigh
15:00 GMT	Gilbey 22'; Thompson-Sommers (yellow card) 34'; Harrison 75'; Maguire 86'	Report	Young 6'; Miller 13'	Stadium: Stadium MK; Attendance: 7,333 (458 away); Referee: Jacob Miles

3 December 2024 18	Milton Keynes Dons	3–0	Chesterfield	Denbigh
19:45 GMT	Hogan 1'; Gilbey 26', 82'; Wearne (yellow card) 61'	Report	Oldaker (yellow card) 13' (yellow-red card) 24'; Araujo (yellow card) 31'; Gordon (yellow card) 84'	Stadium: Stadium MK; Attendance: 5,903 (916 away); Referee: Carl Brook

14 December 2024 20	Milton Keynes Dons	0–1	Gillingham	Denbigh
15:00 GMT		Report	Rowe (yellow card) 27'; Ehmer (yellow card) 37'; McKenzie 59', (yellow card) 90'	Stadium: Stadium MK; Attendance: 7,191 (1,009 away); Referee: Dale Baines

21 December 2024 21	Newport County	6–3	Milton Keynes Dons	Newport
15:00 GMT	Morris 12', 16', 36' (pen.); Kamwa 23', 47', 81', (yellow card) 79'	Report	Nemane (yellow card) 34'; Offord 45+3', 75'; White 71', (yellow card) 72'; Maguire (yellow card) 79'	Stadium: Rodney Parade; Attendance: 3,887 (411 away); Referee: Simon Mather

26 December 2024 22	Milton Keynes Dons	0–2	Notts County	Denbigh
15:00 GMT	Kelly (yellow card) 9'; White (yellow card) 18'	Report	Austin (yellow card) 39'; Abbott 57'; Crowley 71'; Palmer (yellow card) 82'; Bass (yellow card) 87'	Stadium: Stadium MK; Attendance: 9,249 (1,684 away); Referee: Scott Tallis

29 December 2024 23	Milton Keynes Dons	1–1	Crewe Alexandra	Denbigh
15:00 GMT	White 9'; Sherring (yellow card) 49'; Gilbey (yellow card) 75'; Hogan (yellow card) 82'	Report	Knight-Lebel 55', (yellow card) 88'; Conway (yellow card) 62'	Stadium: Stadium MK; Attendance: 7,508 (611 away); Referee: Greg Rollason

1 January 2025 24	Chesterfield	1–2	Milton Keynes Dons	Chesterfield
15:00 GMT	Dobra (yellow card) 45+2'; Mandeville (yellow card) 51'; Oldaker 76'; Colclough (yellow card) 90+4'	Report	Harrison (yellow card) 14'; Hendry 18'; White 44'; Offord (yellow card) 58'; Nemane (yellow card) 75'; Sherring (yellow card) 90+1'	Stadium: SMH Group Stadium; Attendance: 9,119 (584 away); Referee: Elliot Bell

4 January 2025 25	Milton Keynes Dons	0–1	Salford City	Denbigh
15:00 GMT		Report	Adelakun 35'; Ashley (yellow card) 50'; Tilt (yellow card) 52'; Watson (yellow card) 69'; Shephard (yellow card) 78'	Stadium: Stadium MK; Attendance: 5,934 (117 away); Referee: Matthew Russell

18 January 2025 27	Walsall	4–2	Milton Keynes Dons	Bescot
15:00 GMT	Adomah (yellow card) 26', (goal) 81'; Barrett (yellow card) 28'; Okagbue 32', (yellow card) 49'; Gordon 46'; Jellis (yellow card) 58'; Williams 67'	Report	Hogan 14'; Williams (yellow card) 23'; Offord (yellow card) 80'; Thompson-Sommers 85'	Stadium: Bescot Stadium; Attendance: 6,144 (733 away); Referee: Scott Oldham

21 January 2025 17	Fleetwood Town	2–1	Milton Keynes Dons	Fleetwood
19:45 GMT	Bonds (yellow card) 14'; Broom 33'; Coughlan (yellow card) 42'; Sarpong-Wiredu (yellow card) 45+2'; Rooney 68', (yellow card) 83'	Report	White (yellow card) 14'; O'Reilly 81'; Hendry (yellow card) 90+6'	Stadium: Highbury Stadium; Attendance: 2,150; Referee: Thomas Parsons
Note: Fixture was originally scheduled for 23 November, but was postponed due to poor conditions caused by Storm Bert.

25 January 2025 28	Milton Keynes Dons	0–0	AFC Wimbledon	Denbigh
12:30 GMT	Williams (yellow card) 26'	Report	Smith (yellow card) 75'; Browne (yellow card) 79'	Stadium: Stadium MK; Attendance: 7,693 (1,228 away); Referee: Craig Hicks
Note: Fixture was originally scheduled a 15:00 kick-off, but was moved on policing request.

28 January 2025 29	Milton Keynes Dons	2–1	Harrogate Town	Denbigh
19:45 GMT	Thompson (yellow card) 18'; White 27', (yellow card) 70'; Waller (yellow card) 40'; Gilbey (yellow card) 68', (goal) 90+4'	Report	Morris (yellow card) 29'; Sutton (yellow card) 54'; Asare 90+2'; Hill (yellow card) 90+5'	Stadium: Stadium MK; Attendance: 5,101 (103 away); Referee: Lee Swabey

1 February 2025 30	Doncaster Rovers	2–1	Milton Keynes Dons	Doncaster
15:00 GMT	Ironside 31'; Street 73'	Report	Hogan 58'; Sanders (yellow card) 70'; Hendry (yellow card) 76'; Tomlinson (yellow card) 84'	Stadium: Eco-Power Stadium; Attendance: 6,871 (355 away); Referee: Zac Kennard-Kettle

8 February 2025 31	Milton Keynes Dons	0–1	Bromley	Denbigh
15:00 GMT	Tomlinson (yellow card) 28'; Lemonheigh-Evans (yellow card) 31'; Crowley (yellow card) 51'; Williams (yellow card) 78'; O'Reilly (yellow card) 90+9'	Report	Mayor (yellow card) 47'; Cheek (penalty missed) 51'; Thompson 60'	Stadium: Stadium MK; Attendance: 6,972 (596 away); Referee: James Durkin

11 February 2025 19	Barrow	2–1	Milton Keynes Dons	Barrow-in-Furness
19:45 GMT	Spence 10'; Foley (yellow card) 41'; Cameron 62'	Report	Hogan 8'; Lemonheigh-Evans (yellow card) 34'; Hendry (yellow card) 46'	Stadium: Holker Street; Attendance: 2,783 (136 away); Referee: Simon Mather
Note: Fixture was originally scheduled for 7 December, but was postponed due to poor conditions caused by Storm Darragh.

15 February 2025 32	Tranmere Rovers	1–1	Milton Keynes Dons	Birkenhead
15:00 GMT	Norris 79' (pen.)	Report	Orsi 32', (yellow card) 64'; Williams (yellow card) 61'; Patterson (yellow card) 75'	Stadium: Prenton Park; Attendance: 5,699 (270 away); Referee: Stephen Parkinson

22 February 2025 33	Bradford City	2–0	Milton Keynes Dons	Bradford
15:00 GMT	Sarcevic 11', 60'; Adaramola (yellow card) 39'; Khela (yellow card) 50'; Crichlow (yellow card) 68'	Report	Patterson (yellow card) 37'	Stadium: University of Bradford Stadium; Attendance: 17,666 (314 away); Referee: Seb Stockbridge

1 March 2025 34	Milton Keynes Dons	0–1	Colchester United	Denbigh
15:00 GMT	White (yellow card) 28'; Gilbey (yellow card) 87'; Hendry (red card) 90+3'	Report	Gordon (yellow card) 28'; Payne 87' (pen.); Simpson (yellow card) 90+2'	Stadium: Stadium MK; Attendance: 8,002 (1,330 away); Referee: Alex Chilowicz

4 March 2025 35	Accrington Stanley	2–0	Milton Keynes Dons	Accrington
19:45 GMT	Walton 24', (yellow card) 90+6'; O'Brien-Whitmarsh 39'; Quirk (yellow card) 89'	Report	Patterson (yellow card) 59'; Lawrence (yellow card) 62'; Offord (yellow card) 90+6'	Stadium: Wham Stadium; Attendance: 1,596 (97 away); Referee: Gareth Rhodes

8 March 2025 36	Milton Keynes Dons	2–1	Morecambe	Denbigh
15:00 GMT	Trueman (yellow card) 36'; Offord 42'; Lemonheigh-Evans (yellow card) 50'; Orsi 64'; Lawrence (yellow card) 90+2'	Report	Taylor (yellow card) 19'; Angol 37' (pen.)	Stadium: Stadium MK; Attendance: 5,718 (115 away); Referee: Martin Woods

15 March 2025 37	Port Vale	3–0	Milton Keynes Dons	Burslem
15:00 GMT	Tolaj 27'; Stockley 53'; Garrity 90+8'	Report	O'Reilly (yellow card) 55'; Crowley (yellow card) 90'	Stadium: Vale Park; Attendance: 6,773 (294 away); Referee: Michael Barlow

22 March 2025 38	Cheltenham Town	0–1	Milton Keynes Dons	Cheltenham
15:00 GMT	Jude-Boyd (yellow card) 87'	Report	Sanders 9'	Stadium: Whaddon Road; Attendance: 4,283 (388 away); Referee: Darren Drysdale

25 March 2025 26	Carlisle United	2–2	Milton Keynes Dons	Carlisle
19:45 GMT	Vela (yellow card) 3'; Dennis 26'; Harris 45+4'	Report	Tomlinson 6'; Nemane (yellow card) 8'; Gilbey 37'	Stadium: Brunton Park; Attendance: 6,739 (134 away); Referee: Ben Speedie
Note: Fixture was originally scheduled for 11 January, but was postponed due to a frozen pitch.

29 March 2025 39	Milton Keynes Dons	2–4	Fleetwood Town	Denbigh
15:00 GMT	Orsi 27'; Hogan 84'	Report	Neal (yellow card) 16'; Virtue 45'; Bolton 49'; Marsh 60'; Rooney (yellow card) 66'; Devonport 71'	Stadium: Stadium MK; Attendance: 6,273 (138 away); Referee: Anthony Backhouse

2 April 2025 40	Notts County	3–0	Milton Keynes Dons	Nottingham
19:45 BST	McGoldrick 47'; Palmer (yellow card) 52'; Tsaroulla 54'; Jarvis 74'; Edwards (yellow card) 87'	Report	Thompson-Sommers (yellow card) 34'; Gilbey (yellow card) 81'	Stadium: Meadow Lane; Attendance: 8,920 (265 away); Referee: Alan Young
Note: Fixture was originally scheduled for 1 April, but was moved due to the Premier League fixture between Nottingham Forest and Manchester United taking place on the same date.

5 April 2025 41	Milton Keynes Dons	0–3	Barrow	Denbigh
15:00 BST	Offord (yellow card) 59'; O'Reilly (yellow card) 77'; Leko (yellow card) 89'	Report	Pressley 16', 57'; Smith 90+4'	Stadium: Stadium MK; Attendance: 6,585 (168 away); Referee: Jamie O'Connor

12 April 2025 42	Gillingham	1–0	Milton Keynes Dons	Gillingham
15:00 BST	Gbode (yellow card) 65'; Dack 90+5'	Report	Offord (yellow card) 34'; Sanders (yellow card) 64'; Gilbey (yellow card) 81'; Thompson-Sommers (yellow card) 84'	Stadium: MEMS Priestfield Stadium; Attendance: 6,080 (208 away); Referee: Robert Massey-Ellis

18 April 2025 43	Milton Keynes Dons	0–0	Newport County	Denbigh
15:00 BST	Thompson-Sommers (yellow card) 23'; Maguire (yellow card) 39'; Lemonheigh-Evans (yellow card) 43'; O'Reilly (yellow card) 45+1'	Report	Baker-Richardson (yellow card) 50'; Hudlin (yellow card) 89'	Stadium: Stadium MK; Attendance: 8,135 (361 away); Referee: Abigail Byrne

21 April 2025 44	Crewe Alexandra	0–1	Milton Keynes Dons	Crewe
15:00 BST	Thomas (yellow card) 43'	Report	Hogan 28'; Offord (yellow card) 39'; Nemane (yellow card) 50'	Stadium: Mornflake Stadium; Attendance: 4,954; Referee: Charles Breakspear

26 April 2025 45	Milton Keynes Dons	0–0	Grimsby Town	Denbigh
15:00 BST	Hendry (yellow card) 85'	Report		Stadium: Stadium MK; Attendance: 10,244 (2,091 away); Referee: Adam Herczeg

3 May 2025 46	Swindon Town	0–0	Milton Keynes Dons	Swindon
15:00 BST	Smith (yellow card) 24'	Report	Sanders (yellow card) 16'; Hendry (yellow card) 68'	Stadium: County Ground; Attendance: 9,503 (791 away); Referee: Declan Bourne

=== FA Cup ===
The draw for the first round proper took place on 14 October, with the club being drawn at home to fellow League Two side AFC Wimbledon.

Win Draw Loss Fixtures

3 November 2024 First round	Milton Keynes Dons	0–2	AFC Wimbledon	Denbigh
12:30 GMT	Hogan (yellow card) 30'; Lemonheigh-Evans (yellow card) 38' (yellow-red card) 71'; Thompson-Sommers (yellow card) 57'; Harrison (yellow card) 90+2'; Gilbey (yellow card) 90+5'	Report	Neufville (yellow card) 12'; Stevens 44', (yellow card) 73'; Bugiel 51'; Hippolyte (yellow card) 67'; Lewis (yellow card) 90+1'	Stadium: Stadium MK; Attendance: 10,419 (1,855 away); Referee: Matthew Corlett

=== EFL Cup ===
On 27 June, the draw for the first round was made, with MK Dons being drawn away against Watford.

Win Draw Loss Fixtures

13 August 2024 First round	Watford	5–0	Milton Keynes Dons	Watford
19:45 BST	Pollock 24'; Ince 45+1', 67', 74'; Baah 64'; Sierralta (yellow card) 70'	Report	Williams (yellow card) 90'	Stadium: Vicarage Road; Attendance: 6,885; Referee: Lewis Smith

=== EFL Trophy ===
In the group stage, MK Dons were drawn into Southern Group E alongside Colchester United, Leyton Orient and Arsenal U21.

==== Group stage ====
Pos	Div	Team	Pld	W	PW	PL	L	GF	GA	GD	Pts	Qualification
1	L2	Colchester United	3	2	0	1	0	6	2	+4	7	Advance to Round 2
2	L1	Leyton Orient	3	1	1	0	1	5	4	+1	5	Advance to Round 2
3	ACA	Arsenal U21	3	1	0	1	1	4	6	−2	4	
4	L2	Milton Keynes Dons	3	0	1	0	2	4	7	−3	2	

Source: EFL

Win Draw Loss Fixtures

17 September 2024 Group stage	Colchester United	2–1	Milton Keynes Dons	Colchester
19:45 BST	Kelleher (yellow card) 27', (goal) 54'; McDonnell (yellow card) 35'; Scully 41' (pen.); Bendle (yellow card) 77'; Hunt (yellow card) 79'	Report	Wearne 34'	Stadium: JobServe Community Stadium; Attendance: 1,148 (45 away); Referee: Scott Tallis

8 October 2024 Group stage	Milton Keynes Dons	2–2 (3–1 p)	Arsenal U21	Denbigh
19:00 BST	Harrison 26', 32'; Leigh (yellow card) 84'	Report	Annous 30'; Butler-Oyedeji 36'	Stadium: Stadium MK; Attendance: 2,427 (596 away); Referee: Matthew Russell
	Penalties
	(penalty scored) Lewington; (penalty missed) Williams; (penalty scored) Carroll; (penalty scored) Leigh		(penalty missed) Rosiak; (penalty missed) Oulad M'Hand; (penalty missed) Dudziak; (penalty scored) Kacurri

12 November 2024 Group stage	Milton Keynes Dons	1–3	Leyton Orient	Denbigh
19:00 GMT	Hendry (yellow card) 23', (goal) 33'; Lewington (yellow card) 38'; Wood (yellow card) 79'	Report	Kelman 6'; Perkins 21'; James (yellow card) 25'; Obiero (yellow card) 45'; Happe (yellow card) 49'; Cooper (yellow card) 76'; Agyei 90+3'	Stadium: Stadium MK; Attendance: 1,127 (193 away); Referee: Thomas Parsons

== Statistics ==
=== Appearances and goals ===
As of match played 3 May 2025

Players with no appearances are not included in the list
Italics indicate a loaned in player

No.	Pos	Nat	Player	Total		League Two		FA Cup		EFL Cup		EFL Trophy	
No.	Pos	Nat	Player	Apps	Goals	Apps	Goals	Apps	Goals	Apps	Goals	Apps	Goals
1	GK	(England) ENG	Connal Trueman	13	0	13	0	0	0	0	0	0	0
3	DF	(England) ENG	Dean Lewington (captain)	11	0	2+4	0	1	0	1	0	3	0
4	DF	(England) ENG	Jack Tucker	12	0	7+2	0	0	0	0+1	0	2	0
5	DF	(England) ENG	Sam Sherring	13	0	9+1	0	1	0	1	0	1	0
6	DF	(England) ENG	Nathan Thompson	3	0	2+1	0	0	0	0	0	0	0
7	FW	(England) ENG	Jonathan Leko	9	0	2+7	0	0	0	0	0	0	0
8	MF	(England) ENG	Alex Gilbey	44	11	42	11	1	0	0+1	0	0	0
9	FW	(Wales) WAL	Ellis Harrison	24	4	3+16	2	0+1	0	1	0	2+1	2
10	MF	(Republic of Ireland) IRL	Liam Kelly	39	1	32+6	1	0	0	0	0	1	0
11	MF	(England) ENG	Daniel Crowley	18	0	18	0	0	0	0	0	0	0
12	GK	(England) ENG	Nathan Harness	3	0	0	0	0	0	1	0	2	0
14	DF	(England) ENG	Joe Tomlinson	43	5	38+2	5	1	0	1	0	1	0
15	GK	(Scotland) SCO	Craig MacGillivray	10	0	8	0	1	0	0	0	1	0
16	MF	(France) FRA	Aaron Nemane	42	0	36+4	0	1	0	0+1	0	0	0
17	DF	(England) ENG	Luke Offord	44	3	42	3	1	0	0	0	1	0
18	MF	(England) ENG	Tommi O'Reilly	16	1	3+13	1	0	0	0	0	0	0
20	MF	(England) ENG	Kane Thompson-Sommers	23	2	11+11	2	1	0	0	0	0	0
21	FW	(England) ENG	Danilo Orsi	18	3	10+8	3	0	0	0	0	0	0
22	FW	(Scotland) SCO	Callum Hendry	32	4	15+14	3	0+1	0	1	0	1	1
23	DF	(England) ENG	Laurence Maguire	30	1	29+1	1	0	0	0	0	0	0
24	MF	(Wales) WAL	Connor Lemonheigh-Evans	37	2	29+5	2	1	0	0	0	1+1	0
26	DF	(England) ENG	Nico Lawrence	22	0	22	0	0	0	0	0	0	0
27	MF	(England) ENG	Joe White	35	6	23+11	6	0	0	0	0	1	0
29	FW	(Republic of Ireland) IRL	Scott Hogan	34	8	25+8	8	1	0	0	0	0	0
32	DF	(England) ENG	Jack Sanders	13	1	13	1	0	0	0	0	0	0
33	MF	(England) ENG	Damerai Singh-Hurditt	2	0	0	0	0	0	0+1	0	1	0
34	MF	(England) ENG	Callum Tripp	9	0	5+2	0	0	0	1	0	1	0
35	DF	(England) ENG	Charlie Waller	8	0	4+4	0	0	0	0	0	0	0
36	DF	(England) ENG	Charlie Stirland	1	0	0	0	0	0	0	0	1	0
37	DF	(England) ENG	Albert Wood	2	0	0	0	0	0	0	0	1+1	0
38	MF	(England) ENG	Keon Lewis-Burgess	2	0	0	0	0	0	0	0	0+2	0
40	MF	(England) ENG	Rian Silver	2	0	0	0	0	0	0	0	0+2	0
42	MF	(Saint Kitts and Nevis) SKN	Jay Williams	10	0	9+1	0	0	0	0	0	0	0
49	FW	(England) ENG	Chase Medwynter	1	0	0	0	0	0	0	0	0+1	0
50	FW	(England) ENG	Michael Brammeld	1	0	0	0	0	0	0	0	0+1	0
66	DF	(England) ENG	Travis Patterson	7	0	4+3	0	0	0	0	0	0	0
Player(s) who featured whilst on loan but returned to parent club during the season:
1	GK	(Canada) CAN	Tom McGill	25	0	25	0	0	0	0	0	0	0
39	FW	(England) ENG	Sonny Finch	8	1	0+6	1	0	0	0	0	2	0
Player(s) who featured but departed the club permanently during the season:
2	MF	(England) ENG	Joe Pritchard	7	0	3+1	0	0	0	1	0	2	0
6	MF	(Wales) WAL	MJ Williams	17	1	4+9	1	0+1	0	1	0	2	0
11	MF	(England) ENG	Stephen Wearne	14	1	9+2	0	0+1	0	0+1	0	1	1
18	MF	(England) ENG	Tommy Leigh	17	1	7+5	1	1	0	1	0	1+2	0
21	MF	(England) ENG	Brooklyn Ilunga	6	0	0+3	0	0	0	0	0	3	0
28	MF	(England) ENG	Tom Carroll	16	0	3+11	0	0	0	1	0	1	0
30	FW	(England) ENG	Matthew Dennis	2	0	0+2	0	0	0	0	0	0	0

=== Disciplinary record ===
As of match played 3 May 2025

List is sorted by squad number when total number of cards are equal
Players with no cards are not included in the list

No.	Pos.	Nat.	Player	League Two			FA Cup			EFL Cup			EFL Trophy			Total		
No.	Pos.	Nat.	Player	Yellow card	Second yellow card	Red card	Yellow card	Second yellow card	Red card	Yellow card	Second yellow card	Red card	Yellow card	Second yellow card	Red card	Yellow card	Second yellow card	Red card
8	MF	(England)	Alex Gilbey	9	0	0	1	0	0	0	0	0	0	0	0	10	0	0
17	DF	(England)	Luke Offord	10	0	0	0	0	0	0	0	0	0	0	0	10	0	0
22	FW	(Scotland)	Callum Hendry	7	0	1	0	0	0	0	0	0	1	0	0	8	0	1
16	MF	(France)	Aaron Nemane	7	0	0	0	0	0	0	0	0	0	0	0	7	0	0
24	MF	(Wales)	Connor Lemonheigh-Evans	6	0	0	0	1	0	0	0	0	0	0	0	6	1	0
20	MF	(England)	Kane Thompson-Sommers	4	0	0	1	0	0	0	0	0	0	0	0	5	0	0
27	MF	(England)	Joe White	5	0	0	0	0	0	0	0	0	0	0	0	5	0	0
9	FW	(Wales)	Ellis Harrison	2	0	1	1	0	0	0	0	0	0	0	0	3	0	1
18	MF	(England)	Tommi O'Reilly	4	0	0	0	0	0	0	0	0	0	0	0	4	0	0
23	DF	(England)	Laurence Maguire	4	0	0	0	0	0	0	0	0	0	0	0	4	0	0
42	MF	(Saint Kitts and Nevis)	Jay Williams	4	0	0	0	0	0	0	0	0	0	0	0	4	0	0
14	DF	(England)	Joe Tomlinson	3	0	0	0	0	0	0	0	0	0	0	0	3	0	0
32	DF	(England)	Jack Sanders	3	0	0	0	0	0	0	0	0	0	0	0	3	0	0
66	DF	(England)	Travis Patterson	3	0	0	O	0	0	0	0	0	0	0	0	3	0	0
3	DF	(England)	Dean Lewington	1	0	0	0	0	0	0	0	0	1	0	0	2	0	0
5	DF	(England)	Sam Sherring	2	0	0	0	0	0	0	0	0	0	0	0	2	0	0
6	MF	(Wales)	MJ Williams	1	0	0	0	0	0	1	0	0	0	0	0	2	0	0
11	MF	(England)	Daniel Crowley	2	0	0	0	0	0	0	0	0	0	0	0	2	0	0
11	MF	(England)	Stephen Wearne	2	0	0	0	0	0	0	0	0	0	0	0	2	0	0
18	MF	(England)	Tommy Leigh	1	0	0	0	0	0	0	0	0	1	0	0	2	0	0
26	DF	(England)	Nico Lawrence	2	0	0	0	0	0	0	0	0	0	0	0	2	0	0
29	FW	(Republic of Ireland)	Scott Hogan	1	0	0	1	0	0	0	0	0	0	0	0	2	0	0
1	GK	(England)	Connal Trueman	1	0	0	0	0	0	0	0	0	0	0	0	1	0	0
4	DF	(England)	Jack Tucker	1	0	0	0	0	0	0	0	0	0	0	0	1	0	0
6	DF	(England)	Nathan Thompson	1	0	0	0	0	0	0	0	0	0	0	0	1	0	0
7	FW	(England)	Jonathan Leko	1	0	0	0	0	0	0	0	0	0	0	0	1	0	0
10	MF	(Republic of Ireland)	Liam Kelly	1	0	0	0	0	0	0	0	0	0	0	0	1	0	0
21	FW	(England)	Danilo Orsi	1	0	0	0	0	0	0	0	0	0	0	0	1	0	0
34	MF	(England)	Callum Tripp	1	0	0	0	0	0	0	0	0	0	0	0	1	0	0
35	DF	(England)	Charlie Waller	1	0	0	0	0	0	0	0	0	0	0	0	1	0	0
37	DF	(England)	Albert Wood	0	0	0	O	0	0	0	0	0	1	0	0	1	0	0
Totals				91	0	2	4	1	0	1	0	0	4	0	0	100	1	2

=== Awards ===
Recipient	Award	Month	Ref
(England) Alex Gilbey	EFL League Two Player of the Month	November	
(Republic of Ireland) Scott Hogan	EFL League Two Goal of the Month	March	
