= Travis Patterson =

English footballer (born 2005)

Personal information
- Full name: Travis Patterson
- Date of birth: 6 October 2005 (age 21)
- Place of birth: Wolverhampton, England
- Height: 1.78 m (5 ft 10 in)
- Position: Left-back

Team information
- Current team: Aston Villa

Youth career
- –2024: Aston Villa

Senior career*
Years	Team	Apps	(Gls)
2024–	Aston Villa	0	(0)
2025	→ Milton Keynes Dons (loan)	7	(0)
2026	→ Annecy (loan)	7	(0)

International career^{‡}
2019	England U15	1	(0)
2021	England U16	1	(0)
2021	England U17	5	(0)
2023	England U18	2	(0)
2024	England U19	2	(0)
- * Club domestic league appearances and goals as of 9 May 2026 ‡ National team caps and goals as of 24 September 2024

Travis Patterson (born 6 October 2005) is an English professional footballer who plays as a left-back for Premier League club Aston Villa. Patterson is a product of the Aston Villa Academy, having joined the club at under-9 level, he has represented England at a number of youth levels up to U19.

== Club career ==
Born in Wolverhampton, Patterson started his football career in the Aston Villa Academy at the Under-9s level. In October 2022, Patterson was named in The Guardian's annual Next Generation list of the top under-18 players in English football. Later that month, Patterson turned professional signing his first deal with Aston Villa. On 16 August 2024, Patterson signed a long-term contract extension with Aston Villa.

On 24 September 2024, 18-year-old Patterson made his senior debut as a late substitute in an EFL Cup win away to Wycombe Wanderers.

On 3 February 2025, Patterson signed for EFL League Two club Milton Keynes Dons on loan until the end of the season.

On 12 February 2026, Patterson joined Ligue 2 side Annecy on loan until the end of the season. On 3 April 2026, Patterson received the first red card of his professional career, after receiving two yellow cards in a 1–0 league victory over Guingamp.

== International career ==
Patterson has represented England at various youth levels.

== Career statistics ==
As of match played 3 April 2026

Appearances and goals by club, season and competition
Club	Season	League			National cup		League cup		Continental		Other		Total	
Club	Season	Division	Apps	Goals	Apps	Goals	Apps	Goals	Apps	Goals	Apps	Goals	Apps	Goals
Aston Villa	2023–24	Premier League	—		—		—		—		1 (Note: Appearances in EFL Trophy)	0	1	0
Aston Villa	2024–25	Premier League	0	0	0	0	1	0	0	0	1	0	2	0
Aston Villa	2025–26	Premier League	—		—		—		—		0	0	0	0
Aston Villa	Total		0	0	0	0	1	0	0	0	2	0	3	0
Milton Keynes Dons (loan)	2024–25	EFL League Two	7	0	—		—		—		0	0	7	0
Annecy (loan)	2025–26	Ligue 2	4	0	—		—		—		0	0	4	0
Career total			11	0	0	0	1	0	0	0	2	0	14	0

== Honours ==
Aston Villa U21s

- Birmingham Senior Cup: 2023–24
