= Charlie Stirland =

English footballer (born 2005)

Personal information
- Date of birth: 1 October 2005 (age 21)
- Height: 1.84 m (6 ft 0 in)
- Position: Defender

Team information
- Current team: Blyth Spartans

Youth career
- Middlesbrough
- 2022–2023: Milton Keynes Dons

Senior career*
Years	Team	Apps	(Gls)
2023–2025	Milton Keynes Dons	0	(0)
2023–2024	→ Newport Pagnell Town (loan)	6	(0)
2024	→ AFC Dunstable (loan)	11	(0)
2024	→ Leighton Town (loan)	8	(0)
2024	→ Oxford City (loan)	2	(0)
2025	→ Darlington (loan)	5	(0)
2025	Newton Aycliffe	11	(0)
2025–	Blyth Spartans	0	(0)
- * Club domestic league appearances and goals as of 18:00, 11 October 2025 2025 (UTC)

Charlie Stirland (born 1 October 2005) is an English semi-professional footballer who plays as a defender for Northern Premier Division One East club Blyth Spartans.

He is a former graduate of EFL League One club Milton Keynes Dons.

== Career ==
Stirland was with the Academy at Middlesbrough before he joined Milton Keynes Dons, where he turned professional.

On 30 August 2024, he joined Southern League Division One Central club Leighton Town on loan. In November 2024, he joined National League North side Oxford City on a month's loan. He played only twice for Oxford City because of injury, and in February 2025 joined another National North club, Darlington, again on loan for a month.

At the end of the season, Stirland was one of several players released by the club.

== Career statistics ==
As of 11 October 2025

Appearances and goals by club, season and competition
Club	Season	League			FA Cup		EFL Cup		Other		Total	
Club	Season	Division	Apps	Goals	Apps	Goals	Apps	Goals	Apps	Goals	Apps	Goals
Milton Keynes Dons	2023–24	EFL League Two	0	0	0	0	0	0	2 (Note: Appearance(s) in EFL Trophy)	0	2	0
Milton Keynes Dons	2024–25	EFL League Two	0	0	0	0	0	0	1	0	1	0
Milton Keynes Dons	Total		0	0	0	0	0	0	3	0	3	0
Newport Pagnell Town (loan)	2023–24	UCL Premier South	6	0	0	0	0	0	1	0	7	0
AFC Dunstable (loan)	2023–24	Southern League Division One Central	11	0	0	0	—		3 (Note: Appearance(s) in Bedfordshire Senior Cup)	0	14	0
Leighton Town (loan)	2024–25	SFL Division One Central	8	0	0	0	—		2 (Note: Appearance(s) in FA Trophy)	0	10	0
Oxford City (loan)	2024–25	National League North	2	0	0	0	—		0	0	2	0
Darlington (loan)	2024–25	National League North	5	0	0	0	—		0	0	5	0
Newton Aycliffe	2025–26	Northern Premier Division One East	11	0	0	0	—		0	0	11	0
Blyth Spartans	2025–26	Northern Premier Division One East	0	0	0	0	—		0	0	0	0
Career total			43	0	0	0	0	0	9	0	52	0
