= Joe White (midfielder, born 2002) =

English footballer (born 2002)

Personal information
- Full name: Joe Peter White
- Date of birth: 1 October 2002 (age 24)
- Place of birth: Carlisle, England
- Height: 1.86 m (6 ft 1 in)
- Position: Attacking midfielder

Team information
- Current team: Crewe Alexandra
- Number: 10

Youth career
- 2010–2016: Carlisle United
- 2016–2021: Newcastle United

Senior career*
Years	Team	Apps	(Gls)
2021–2026	Newcastle United	4	(0)
2022	→ Hartlepool United (loan)	15	(0)
2023	→ Exeter City (loan)	16	(0)
2023–2024	→ Crewe Alexandra (loan)	20	(3)
2024–2025	→ Milton Keynes Dons (loan)	34	(6)
2025–2026	→ Leyton Orient (loan)	3	(0)
2026	→ Bradford City (loan)	3	(0)
2026–	Crewe Alexandra	15	(0)

International career
2019	England U18	3	(0)
- * Club domestic league appearances and goals as of 16:28, 21 November 2026 (UTC)

Joe Peter White (born 1 October 2002) is an English professional footballer who plays as an attacking midfielder for EFL League Two club Crewe Alexandra.

== Club career ==
=== Newcastle United ===
Born in Carlisle, White began his career at hometown club Carlisle United before moving to Newcastle United in 2016. He signed on loan for Hartlepool United in January 2022. On 5 February 2022, White made his Hartlepool debut as a substitute in a 2–0 FA Cup defeat to Premier League side Crystal Palace. In February 2022 Hartlepool manager Graeme Lee said he wanted to sign White permanently. After eight appearances for the club, White was injured in March 2022 but quickly returned to complete 16 League and cup appearances for Pools.

On 6 January 2023, White signed for League One club Exeter City on loan until the end of the 2022–23 season, also making 16 appearances.

On 1 September 2023, White joined League Two side Crewe Alexandra on loan until 14 January 2024. He made his Crewe debut the following day, coming on as a 63rd minute replacement for Conor Thomas in a 3–1 win over Milton Keynes Dons at Gresty Road. He scored his first senior professional goal in Crewe's 2–0 league defeat of Gillingham on 3 October 2023. After White scored his third Crewe goal, securing a 1–0 victory at Mansfield Town on 6 January 2024, Crewe manager Lee Bell said he wanted to keep him at the club for the remainder of the season, but White's loan ended on 16 January 2024.

In August 2024, after extending his Newcastle contract, he moved on loan to Milton Keynes Dons for the remainder of the 2024–25 season. On 1 October 2024, White scored his first goal for the club in a 5–1 away win over Harrogate Town.

In July 2025 he signed on loan for Leyton Orient. In January 2026 he signed on loan for Bradford City. Bradford City manager Graham Alexander said he hoped he would revive White's career following a "frustrating" spell with Leyton Orient. However, White only had limited game time throughout January due to strong competition in the squad.

=== Crewe Alexandra ===
In July 2026, White returned to Crewe Alexandra on a permanent basis, signing a two-year contract.

== International career ==
He has represented England at under-18 level.

== Personal life ==
His grandfather Peter Hampton was also a footballer.

== Career statistics ==
As of match played 21 November 2026

Appearances and goals by club, season and competition
Club	Season	League			FA Cup		EFL Cup		Other		Total	
Club	Season	Division	Apps	Goals	Apps	Goals	Apps	Goals	Apps	Goals	Apps	Goals
Newcastle United U21s	2019–20	—			—		—		2 (Note: Appearances in EFL Trophy)	0	2	0
Newcastle United U21s	2020–21	—			—		—		0	0	0	0
Newcastle United U21s	2021–22	—			—		—		2	1	2	1
Newcastle United U21s	2022–23	—			—		—		3	0	3	0
Newcastle United U21s	Total	—							7	1	7	1
Newcastle United	2021–22	Premier League	0	0	0	0	0	0	—		0	0
Newcastle United	2022–23	Premier League	0	0	0	0	0	0	—		0	0
Newcastle United	2023–24	Premier League	4	0	0	0	0	0	0	0	4	0
Newcastle United	2024–25	Premier League	0	0	0	0	0	0	—		0	0
Newcastle United	2025–26	Premier League	0	0	0	0	0	0	—		0	0
Newcastle United	Total		4	0	0	0	0	0	0	0	4	0
Hartlepool United (loan)	2021–22	League Two	15	0	1	0	0	0	—		16	0
Exeter City (loan)	2022–23	League One	16	0	0	0	0	0	—		16	0
Crewe Alexandra (loan)	2023–24	League Two	20	3	3	0	0	0	2	0	25	3
Milton Keynes Dons (loan)	2024–25	League Two	34	6	0	0	0	0	1	0	35	6
Leyton Orient (loan)	2025–26	League One	3	0	0	0	1	0	2	0	6	0
Bradford City (loan)	2025–26	League One	3	0	0	0	0	0	—		3	0
Crewe Alexandra	2026–27	League Two	15	0	1	0	1	0	1	0	18	0
Career total			110	9	5	0	2	0	13	1	130	10
