= 2026–27 Crewe Alexandra F.C. season =

150th season in existence of Crewe Alexandra FC

Crewe Alexandra
2026–27 season
- Chairman: Charles Grant
- Manager: Lee Bell
- Stadium: Gresty Road
Home colours	Away colours

The 2026–27 season is the 150th season in the history of Crewe Alexandra Football Club and their fifth consecutive season in League Two. The club are participating in League Two, the FA Cup, the EFL Cup, and the EFL Trophy.

== Transfers and contracts ==
=== In ===
Date	Pos.	Player	From	Fee	Ref.
1 July 2026 (Note: The transfer was announced on 9 June, and would become official on July 1 once Gibson's contract at Doncaster Rovers expired.)	RM	(England) Jordan Gibson	(England) Doncaster Rovers	Free	
1 July 2026 (Note: The transfer was announced on 30 June, and would become official on July 1 once Offord's contract at Milton Keynes Dons expired.)	MF	(England) Luke Offord	(England) Milton Keynes Dons	Free	
16 July 2026	CAM	(England) Joe White	(England) Newcastle United	Undisclosed	
4 November 2026	CM	(Scotland) James Jones	(England) Burton Albion	Free	

=== Loaned in ===
Date	Pos.	Player	From	Loaned until	Ref.
13 August 2026	CF	(England) Charlie McNeill	(England) Sheffield Wednesday	End of Season	
21 August 2026	CB	(England) Josh Stephenson	(England) Brentford	End of Season	
21 August 2026	CM	(Scotland) Kyle Ure	(Scotland) Celtic	End of Season	

=== Loaned out ===
Date	Pos.	Player	To	Loaned until	Ref.
6 August 2026	RW	(England) Dion Rankine	(England) Eastleigh	2 January 2027	
7 August 2026	RW	(England) Fin Roberts	(England) Brackley Town	2 January 2027	
28 August 2026	CB	(England) Tom Graves	(England) Nantwich Town	26 September 2026	
6 November 2026	CF	(England) Noah Bell	(England) Chester	4 December 2026	
20 November 2026	CDM	(England) Luca Moore	(England) Macclesfield	3 January 2027	

=== Out ===
Date	Pos.	Player	To	Fee	Ref.

=== Released / out of contract ===
Date	Pos.	Player	Subsequent club	Joined date	Ref.
30 June 2026	CB	(Wales) James Connolly	(England) Walsall	1 July 2026	
30 June 2026	CM	(England) Max Sanders	(England) Notts County	1 July 2026	
30 June 2026	CB	(Wales) Zac Williams	(England) Barnet	1 July 2026	
30 June 2026	CF	(England) Louis Moult	(England) AFC Telford United	31 July 2026	
30 June 2026	CM	(England) Oliver Armstrong	(United States) South Carolina Gamecocks	1 August 2026	
30 June 2026	CM	(England) Alfie Jones-Mellor	(England) Chester	1 August 2026	
30 June 2026	CB	(England) Isaac Irwin	(England) Preston North End	19 August 2026	
30 June 2026	CF	(England) Omar Bogle	(England) Truro City	27 August 2026	
30 June 2026	LB	(England) Charlie Finney	(England) F.C. United of Manchester	18 September 2026	
30 June 2026	CF	(England) Jordan Hodkin			
30 June 2026	CM	(England) Jack Powell	(England) Hornchurch	3 July 2026	
30 June 2026	RW	(England) Shilow Tracey	(England) Hornchurch	20 November 2026	

=== New contract ===
Date	Pos.	Player	Contract until	Ref.
12 May 2026	LW	(Wales) Calum Agius	30 June 2027	
12 May 2026	CDM	(England) Owen Lunt	30 June 2027	
12 May 2026	CM	(England) Joel Tabiner	30 June 2027	
13 May 2026	CF	(Republic of Ireland) Adrien Thibaut	30 June 2028 (Note: Includes an option for a further year)	
16 June 2026	CF	(England) Josh March	30 June 2028	
17 June 2026	CDM	(England) Conor Thomas	30 June 2027	
1 July 2026 (Note: The contract was announced on 28 June, and would official commence on July 1.)	RW	(Wales) Patrick Mlynarski	30 June 2027 (Note: First professional contract)	
10 July 2026	RW	(England) Fin Roberts	30 June 2027	
20 July 2026	CM	(England) Luca Moore	30 June 2028	
23 July 2026	RB	(England) Lewis Billington	30 June 2029	
11 August 2026	RB	(Wales) Stan Dancey	30 June 2028	
11 August 2026	CDM	(England) Owen Lunt	30 June 2028	

== Pre-season and friendlies ==
On 22 May, Crewe announced four pre-season friendlies against Witton Albion, Prescot Cables, AFC Telford United and Chester. A home friendly against Birmingham City was later confirmed. On 17 June, a second home friendly was announced against Stoke City. On 7 July a visit to face Newcastle Town was announced.

Win Draw Loss Fixtures

11 July 2026 Friendly	Witton Albion	2–3	Crewe Alexandra	Wincham
15:00 BST		Report	Roberts 57', 79'; Moore 90+5'	Stadium: Wincham Park

14 July 2026 Friendly	Prescot Cables	Cancelled	Crewe Alexandra	Prescot
19:45 BST				Stadium: Valerie Park
Note: Fixture was cancelled upon the arrival of the players with concerns over the playing surface.

18 July 2026 Friendly	Crewe Alexandra	1–1	Stoke City	Crewe
15:00 BST	Thibaut 76'	Report	Gallagher 43'; Tchamadeu (yellow card) 47'	Stadium: Mornflake Stadium

21 July 2026 Friendly	AFC Telford United	0–3	Crewe Alexandra	Wellington
19:45 BST		Report	Lankester 39'; Gibson 47'; March 84'	Stadium: New Bucks Head

25 July 2026 Friendly	Crewe Alexandra	1–2	Birmingham City	Crewe
15:00 BST	Gibson 20'	Report	Stansfield 5'; Bateman 59'	Stadium: Mornflake Stadium

28 July 2026 Friendly	Newcastle Town	1–0	Crewe Alexandra	Newcastle-under-Lyme
19:30 BST	Jones 43'	Report		Stadium: Lyme Valley Stadium

1 August 2026 Friendly	Chester	0–0	Crewe Alexandra	Chester
15:00 BST				Stadium: Deva Stadium

== Competitions ==
=== League Two ===
==== League table ====
Pos	Team	Pld	W	D	L	GF	GA	GD	Pts	Promotion, qualification or relegation
4	Grimsby Town	16	6	6	4	28	19	+9	24	Qualification for League Two play-offs
5	York City	16	6	6	4	25	21	+4	24	Qualification for League Two play-offs
6	Crewe Alexandra	16	5	9	2	22	22	0	24	Qualification for League Two play-offs
7	Walsall	14	5	8	1	21	12	+9	23	Qualification for League Two play-offs
8	Exeter City	16	6	5	5	13	10	+3	23	

Updated to match(es) played on 21 November 2026. Source: EFL Official Website
Rules for classification: 1) Points; 2) Goal difference; 3) Number of goals scored; 4) Head-to-head results; 5) Wins; 6) Away goals; 7) Penalty points (sec 9.5); 8) 12-point sending off offences

==== Results summary ====
Overall								Home						Away					
Pld	W	D	L	GF	GA	GD	Pts	W	D	L	GF	GA	GD	W	D	L	GF	GA	GD
16	5	9	2	22	22	0	24	3	5	0	14	10	+4	2	4	2	8	12	−4

Last updated: 21 November 2026.
Source: Soccerway

==== Results by round ====
Round	1	2	3	4	5	6	7	8	9	10	11	12	13	14	15	16
Ground	A	H	A	H	H	A	H	A	H	A	H	A	A	H	H	A
Result	W	W	D	D	D	D	D	D	W	W	W	L	L	D	D	D
Position	8	2	5	4	7	8	9	9	3	3	3	3	4	4	5	6
Points	3	6	7	8	9	10	11	12	15	18	21	21	21	22	23	24

Source: EFL
A = Away; H = Home; W = Win; D = Draw; L = Loss; P = Postponed

==== Matches ====
On 25 June, the League Two fixtures were revealed.

Win Draw Loss Fixtures

15 August 2026 1	Crawley Town	0–1	Crewe Alexsandr	Crawley
15:00 BST	Arthurs (yellow card) 31'; Gordon (red card) 51'; Ebiowei (red card) 64'	Report	Gibson (yellow card) 24'; White (yellow card) 52'; Agius (yellow card) 65'; Demetriou (yellow card) 66' (yellow-red card) 85'; March 90+5'; McNeill (yellow card) 90+8'	Stadium: Broadfield Stadium; Attendance: 6,134; Referee: Andrew Humphries
Note: Crewe Alexandra were temporarily renamed to Crewe Alexsandr for the first matchday of the season after Compare the Market signed a partnership deal with the EFL.

22 August 2026 2	Crewe Alexandra	1–0	Northampton Town	Crewe
15:00 BST	March (yellow card) 37', (goal) 53'	Report	Evans (yellow card) 87'	Stadium: Mornflake Stadium; Attendance: 5,375 (861 away); Referee: Lewis Sandoe

29 August 2026 3	Port Vale	0–0	Crewe Alexandra	Burslem
12:30 BST		Report	Demetriou (yellow card) 80'	Stadium: Vale Park; Attendance: 8,997 (1,820 away); Referee: Ben Toner
Note: Fixture was initially scheduled for a 15:00 kick-off, but was brought forward for live Sky Sports broadcasting.

1 September 2026 4	Crewe Alexandra	2–2	Walsall	Crewe
19:45 BST	March 50'; Hutchinson 90+2'	Report	Pressley 42' (pen.), 57'; Simper (yellow card) 75'; Sodje (yellow card) 88'	Stadium: Mornflake Stadium; Attendance: 4,918; Referee: Oliver Mackey

5 September 2026 5	Crewe Alexandra	1–1	York City	Crewe
15:00 BST	Offord 9'; Billington (yellow card) 29'	Report	Banks (yellow card) 13'; Newby 40'; Williams (yellow card) 90'	Stadium: Mornflake Stadium; Attendance: 5,989 (1,249 away); Referee: Simon Mather

12 September 2026 6	Colchester United	1–1	Crewe Alexandra	Colchester
15:00 BST	Anderson 27'	Report	Agius (yellow card) 46'; Stephenson 90+3'	Stadium: JobServe Community Stadium; Attendance: 4,561 (200 away); Referee: Stephen Parkinson

19 September 2026 7	Crewe Alexandra	1–1	Shrewsbury Town	Crewe
15:00 BST	White (yellow card) 5'; Gibson 24'; Offord (yellow card) 54'		Lee (yellow card) 22'; Sang (yellow card) 29'; Gray (yellow card) 37'; Lloyd 39'; Boyle (yellow card) 64'	Stadium: Mornflake Stadium; Referee: Alex Chilowicz

26 September 2026 8	Rotherham United	1–1	Crewe Alexandra	Rotherham
15:00 BST	Bradshaw (yellow card) 41'; Mullin 44'	Report	Stephenson (yellow card) 13'; Iorfa 21' (o.g.); Ure (yellow card) 65'	Stadium: AESSEAL New York Stadium; Attendance: 7,860 (624 away); Referee: David Rock

3 October 2026 9	Crewe Alexandra	3–1	Bristol Rovers	Crewe
15:00 BST	Lankester 1', 21' (pen.); March (yellow card) 8'; Stephenson (yellow card) 10'; Lunt (yellow card) 38'; Gibson 66'; Thomas (yellow card) 79'		James (yellow card) 8'; Kelly (yellow card) 30'; Gough (yellow card) 77'; Mola (yellow card) 89'	Stadium: Mornflake Stadium; Referee: Matthew Russell

10 October 2026 10	Swindon Town	0–1	Crewe Alexandra	Swindon
12:30 BST	Clarke (yellow card) 14'; Ripley (yellow card) 90+6'	Report	Gibson 60'; Holíček (yellow card) 64'	Stadium: The Nigel Eady County Ground; Attendance: 7,123; Referee: Jamie O'Connor
Note: Fixture was initially scheduled for a 15:00 kick-off, but was brought forward for live Sky Sports broadcasting.

17 October 2026 11	Crewe Alexandra	3–2	Rochdale	Crewe
15:00 BST	Holíček 39'; Gibson 45', 55'; White (yellow card) 50'	Report	Tabiner 65' (o.g.); Flint 90'	Stadium: Mornflake Stadium; Referee: Aaron Jackson

20 October 2026 12	Exeter City	2–0	Crewe Alexandra	Exeter
19:45 BST	Scully 21' (pen.); Fitzwater (yellow card) 81'; Cole 90+4'	Report	McNeill (yellow card) 57'	Stadium: St James Park; Attendance: 5,671; Referee: Harry Wager

24 October 2026 13	Chesterfield	5–1	Crewe Alexandra	Chesterfield
15:00 BST	Koroma 3'; Naylor 6'; Bryden 19'; Stephenson 35' (o.g.); Mandeville 45+2'	Report	McNeill 57'	Stadium: SMH Group Stadium; Attendance: 7,985; Referee: William Davis

31 October 2026 14	Crewe Alexandra	1–1	Barnet	Crewe
15:00 GMT	Hutchinson (yellow card) 33'; Williams 85' (o.g.)	Report	Knowles 34'; Tavares (yellow card) 36'; Ofoborh (yellow card) 45'; Gallagher (yellow card) 72'	Stadium: Mornflake Stadium; Attendance: 4,855 (431 away); Referee: Harrison Blair

14 November 2026 15	Crewe Alexandra	2–2	Newport County	Crewe
15:00 GMT	Gibson (yellow card) 15'; McNeill (yellow card) 38', (goal) 77'; Holíček (yellow card) 55'; Thibaut (yellow card) 61'; Stephenson 90'	Report	Brennan (yellow card) 1'; Offord 3' (o.g.); Sassi 34'; Etete (yellow card) 60'	Stadium: Mornflake Stadium; Attendance: 5,198 (429 away); Referee: Thomas Parsons

21 November 2026 16	Gillingham	3–3	Crewe Alexandra	Gillingham
12:30 GMT	Hale 22' (pen.), 40' (pen.), (yellow card) 54'; Little (yellow card) 90+2'; McCleary 90+6'	Report	McManus 4' (o.g.); Thomas (yellow card) 21'; McNeill 61' (pen.); Agius 74'; March (yellow card) 90+2'	Stadium: MEMS Priestfield Stadium; Attendance: 5,198; Referee: Declan Bourne
Note: Fixture was initially scheduled for a 15:00 kick-off, but was brought forward for live Sky Sports broadcasting.

28 November 2025 17	Crewe Alexandra	v	Grimsby Town	Crewe
15:00 GMT				Stadium: Mornflake Stadium

1 December 2026 18	Accrington Stanley	v	Crewe Alexandra	Accrington
19:45 GMT				Stadium: Crown Ground

12 December 2026 19	Cheltenham Town	v	Crewe Alexandra	Cheltenham
15:00 GMT				Stadium: Whaddon Road

17 December 2026 20	Crewe Alexandra	v	Salford City	Crewe
20:00 GMT				Stadium: Mornflake Stadium
Note: Fixture was initially scheduled for 19 December, but was brought forward two days for live Sky Sports broadcasting.

26 December 2026 21	Fleetwood Town	v	Crewe Alexandra	Fleetwood
15:00 GMT				Stadium: Highbury Stadium

29 December 2026 22	Crewe Alexandra	v	Tranmere Rovers	Crewe
19:45 GMT				Stadium: Mornflake Stadium

1 January 2027 23	Crewe Alexandra	v	Oldham Athletic	Crewe
15:00 GMT				Stadium: Mornflake Stadium

9 January 2027 24	Salford City	v	Crewe Alexandra	Kersal
15:00 GMT				Stadium: Moor Lane

16 January 2027 25	Rochdale	v	Crewe Alexandra	Spotland
15:00 GMT				Stadium: Crown Oil Arena

19 January 2027 26	Crewe Alexandra	v	Exeter City	Crewe
19:45 GMT				Stadium: Mornflake Stadium

23 January 2027 27	Crewe Alexandra	v	Chesterfield	Crewe
15:00 GMT				Stadium: Mornflake Stadium

30 January 2027 28	Barnet	v	Crewe Alexandra	Edgware
15:00 GMT				Stadium: The Hive Stadium

6 February 2027 29	Crewe Alexandra	v	Port Vale	Crewe
12:30 GMT				Stadium: Mornflake Stadium
Note: Fixture was initially scheduled for a 15:00 kick-off, but was brought forward for live Sky Sports broadcasting.

9 February 2027 30	Walsall	v	Crewe Alexandra	Bescot
20:00 GMT				Stadium: Bescot Stadium
Note: Fixture was initially scheduled for a 19:45 kick-off, but was pushed back fifteen minutes for live Sky Sports broadcasting.

13 February 2027 31	York City	v	Crewe Alexandra	Huntington
15:00 GMT				Stadium: LNER Community Stadium

20 February 2027 32	Crewe Alexandra	v	Colchester United	Crewe
15:00 GMT				Stadium: Mornflake Stadium

27 February 2027 33	Newport County	v	Crewe Alexandra	Newport
15:00 GMT				Stadium: Rodney Parade

6 March 2027 34	Crewe Alexandra	v	Crawley Town	Crewe
15:00 GMT				Stadium: Mornflake Stadium

13 March 2027 35	Northampton Town	v	Crewe Alexandra	Northampton
15:00 GMT				Stadium: Sixfields

20 March 2027 36	Crewe Alexandra	v	Gillingham	Crewe
15:00 GMT				Stadium: Mornflake Stadium

26 March 2027 37	Oldham Athletic	v	Crewe Alexandra	Oldham
15:00 GMT				Stadium: Boundary Park

29 March 2027 38	Crewe Alexandra	v	Fleetwood Town	Crewe
15:00 BST				Stadium: Mornflake Stadium

3 April 2027 39	Tranmere Rovers	v	Crewe Alexandra	Birkenhead
15:00 BST				Stadium: Prenton Park

10 April 2027 40	Crewe Alexandra	v	Cheltenham Town	Crewe
15:00 BST				Stadium: Mornflake Stadium

13 April 2027 41	Crewe Alexandra	v	Swindon Town	Crewe
19:45 BST				Stadium: Mornflake Stadium

17 April 2027 42	Shrewsbury Town	v	Crewe Alexandra	Shrewsbury
15:00 BST				Stadium: New Meadow

24 April 2027 43	Crewe Alexandra	v	Rotherham United	Crewe
15:00 BST				Stadium: Mornflake Stadium

27 April 2027 44	Bristol Rovers	v	Crewe Alexandra	Bristol
15:00 BST				Stadium: Memorial Stadium

1 May 2027 45	Grimsby Town	v	Crewe Alexandra	Cleethorpes
15:00 BST				Stadium: Blundell Park

8 May 2027 46	Crewe Alexandra	v	Accrington Stanley	Crewe
15:00 BST				Stadium: Mornflake Stadium

=== FA Cup ===
Crewe were drawn at home to AFC Wimbledon in the first round and to Plymouth Argyle in the second round.

Win Draw Loss Fixtures

7 November 2026 First round	Crewe Alexandra	2–1	AFC Wimbledon	Crewe
15:00 GMT	McNeill 12'; Gibson (yellow card) 18'; Thomas 62'; Hutchinson (yellow card) 70'; White (yellow card) 78'; Thibaut (yellow card) 89'; Billington (yellow card) 90+1'	Report	Smith (yellow card) 61'; Yiadom 82'	Stadium: Mornflake Stadium; Attendance: 3,015 (347 away); Referee: Matthew Donohue

4–7 December 2026 Second round	Crewe Alexandra	v	Plymouth Argyle	Crewe
TBA GMT				Stadium: Mornflake Stadium

=== EFL Cup ===
Crewe were drawn at home to Accrington Stanley in the first round and away to Barnsley in the second round.

Win Draw Loss Fixtures

8 August 2026 First round	Crewe Alexandra	2–1	Accrington Stanley	Crewe
15:00 BST	Lankester 7' (pen.); Moore 85'	Report	Rawson (yellow card) 45+5', (goal) 65'; Anderson (yellow card) 74'; Love (yellow card) 90+2'	Stadium: Mornflake Stadium; Attendance: 2,961 (184 away); Referee: Ross Martin

25 August 2026 Second round	Barnsley	3–2	Crewe Alexandra	Barnsley
19:45 BST	Bland (yellow card) 23'; Cleary 29'; Noslin 31'; O'Keeffe 38'; Ravenhill (yellow card) 89'	Report	Thibaut 21'; Ewusi 89'	Stadium: Oakwell; Attendance: 3,002; Referee: Leigh Doughty

=== EFL Trophy ===
==== Group stage ====
Crewe were drawn against Wigan Athletic, Blackpool and Aston Villa U21 into Northern Group B.

Pos	Div	Team	Pld	W	PW	PL	L	GF	GA	GD	Pts	Qualification
1	L1	Wigan Athletic	3	3	0	0	0	8	5	+3	9	Advance to Round 2
2	L1	Blackpool	3	1	1	0	1	7	7	0	5	Advance to Round 2
3	L2	Crewe Alexandra	3	1	0	1	1	7	5	+2	4	
4	ACA	Aston Villa U21	3	0	0	0	3	5	10	−5	0	

Source: EFL

Win Draw Loss Fixtures

22 September 2026 Group stage	Crewe Alexandra	4–1	Aston Villa U21	Crewe
19:00 BST	Lunt (yellow card) 11'; Offord 31'; Thibaut 40'; Lankester 48', 88'; Billington (yellow card) 65'	Report	Routh (yellow card) 62'; Jenner 85'	Stadium: Mornflake Stadium; Attendance: 901 (72 away); Referee: Niall Smith

6 October 2026 Group stage	Blackpool	2–2 (4–2 p)	Crewe Alexandra	Blackpool
19:00 BST	Morgan 46', 53'	Report	Gibson 30'; McNeill (yellow card) 72', (goal) 80' (pen.); Thibaut (yellow card) 73'; Roberts (yellow card) 74'	Stadium: Bloomfield Road; Attendance: 915; Referee: Steven Copeland
	Penalties
	Yates (penalty scored); Taylor (penalty scored); Clarkson (penalty scored); Munroe (penalty scored)		McNeill (penalty scored); Thibaut (penalty missed); Dancey (penalty missed); Roberts (penalty scored)

10 November 2026 Group stage	Crewe Alexandra	1–2	Wigan Athletic	Crewe
19:00 GMT	Graves (yellow card) 12', (goal) 50'; Nsenga (yellow card) 44'	Report	Higgins (yellow card) 28'; Chilokoa-Mullen 60'; Rimmer 83'	Stadium: Mornflake Stadium; Attendance: 1,150 (307 away); Referee: Declan Brown

== Statistics ==
=== Appearances and goals ===
As of match played 21 November 2026

Players with no appearances are not included on the list; italics indicated a loaned in player

No.	Pos	Nat	Player	Total		League Two		FA Cup		EFL Cup		EFL Trophy	
No.	Pos	Nat	Player	Apps	Goals	Apps	Goals	Apps	Goals	Apps	Goals	Apps	Goals
1	GK	(England) ENG	Tom Booth	18	0	14+0	0	0+0	0	2+0	0	2+0	0
2	DF	(England) ENG	Lewis Billington	20	0	16+0	0	1+0	0	1+1	0	0+1	0
3	DF	(England) ENG	Reece Hutchinson	14	1	9+2	1	1+0	0	2+0	0	0+0	0
4	MF	(Scotland) SCO	Kyle Ure	13	0	5+4	0	0+1	0	1+0	0	2+0	0
5	DF	(England) ENG	Mickey Demetriou	7	0	3+2	0	0+0	0	1+1	0	0+0	0
6	DF	(England) ENG	Luke Offord	20	2	15+0	1	1+0	0	2+0	0	2+0	1
7	MF	(England) ENG	Jack Lankester	12	5	7+2	2	0+0	0	1+0	1	2+0	2
8	MF	(England) ENG	Conor Thomas	10	1	4+5	0	1+0	1	0+0	0	0+0	0
9	FW	(England) ENG	Josh March	18	3	15+1	3	1+0	0	1+0	0	0+0	0
10	MF	(England) ENG	Joe White	18	0	12+3	0	1+0	0	1+0	0	1+0	0
11	MF	(England) ENG	Joel Tabiner	19	0	13+3	0	0+1	0	0+1	0	1+0	0
12	DF	(England) ENG	Josh Stephenson	18	2	15+0	2	1+0	0	1+0	0	0+1	0
13	GK	(Republic of Ireland) IRL	Ian Lawlor	4	0	2+0	0	1+0	0	0+0	0	1+0	0
14	FW	(England) ENG	Jordan Gibson	21	6	12+4	5	1+0	0	1+1	0	1+1	1
17	MF	(Slovakia) SVK	Matúš Holíček	17	1	14+1	1	1+0	0	1+0	0	0+0	0
19	MF	(England) ENG	Owen Lunt	12	0	5+4	0	0+1	0	0+0	0	2+0	0
20	FW	(Wales) WAL	Calum Agius	19	1	6+8	1	0+1	0	2+0	0	2+0	0
21	FW	(England) ENG	Fin Roberts	2	0	0+0	0	0+0	0	0+0	0	0+2	0
22	DF	(England) ENG	Phil Croker	1	0	0+0	0	0+0	0	1+0	0	0+0	0
23	FW	(England) ENG	Charlie McNeill	19	5	4+11	3	1+0	1	1+0	0	2+0	1
24	MF	(Scotland) SCO	James Jones	3	0	0+2	0	0+0	0	0+0	0	1+0	0
27	FW	(Wales) WAL	Patrick Mlynrski	2	0	0+0	0	0+0	0	0+1	0	0+1	0
29	FW	(Republic of Ireland) IRL	Adrien Thibaut	21	2	4+11	0	0+1	0	1+1	1	2+1	1
30	DF	(Wales) WAL	Stan Dancey	6	0	1+1	0	0+0	0	1+0	0	3+0	0
32	MF	(England) ENG	Luca Moore	6	1	0+1	0	0+0	0	1+1	1	3+0	0
34	FW	(England) ENG	Lucas Swann	1	0	0+0	0	0+0	0	0+0	0	0+1	0
35	FW	(England) ENG	Noah Bell	1	0	0+0	0	0+0	0	0+0	0	0+1	0
36	MF	(England) ENG	Joel Ewusi	4	1	0+0	0	0+0	0	0+1	1	1+2	0
37	DF	(England) ENG	Tom Graves	3	1	0+0	0	0+0	0	0+0	0	3+0	1
38	DF	(England) ENG	Ryan Chadwick	3	0	0+0	0	0+0	0	0+0	0	1+2	0
39	MF	(England) ENG	Max Wilson	1	0	0+0	0	0+0	0	0+0	0	0+1	0
40	DF	(England) ENG	Gaël Nsenga	1	0	0+0	0	0+0	0	0+0	0	1+0	0
42	MF	(Wales) WAL	Jacob Worthington	1	0	0+0	0	0+0	0	0+0	0	0+1	0

=== Disciplinary record ===
As of match played 21 November 2026

Rank	No.	Pos.	Player	League Two			FA Cup			EFL Cup			EFL Trophy			Total		
Rank	No.	Pos.	Player	Yellow card	(yellow card) (yellow-red card)	Red card	Yellow card	(yellow card) (yellow-red card)	Red card	Yellow card	(yellow card) (yellow-red card)	Red card	Yellow card	(yellow card) (yellow-red card)	Red card	Yellow card	(yellow card) (yellow-red card)	Red card
1	10	CAM	(England) Joe White	3	0	0	1	0	0	0	0	0	0	0	0	4	0	0
2	2	RB	(England) Lewis Billington	1	0	0	1	0	0	0	0	0	1	0	0	3	0	0
2	5	CB	(England) Mickey Demetriou	1	1	0	0	0	0	0	0	0	0	0	0	1	1	0
2	9	CF	(England) Josh March	3	0	0	0	0	0	0	0	0	0	0	0	3	0	0
2	14	RM	(England) Jordan Gibson	2	0	0	1	0	0	0	0	0	0	0	0	3	0	0
2	23	CF	(England) Charlie McNeill	2	0	0	0	0	0	0	0	0	1	0	0	3	0	0
2	29	CF	(Republic of Ireland) Adrien Thibaut	1	0	0	1	0	0	0	0	0	1	0	0	3	0	0
8	3	LB	(England) Reece Hutchinson	1	0	0	1	0	0	0	0	0	0	0	0	2	0	0
8	8	CM	(England) Conor Thomas	2	0	0	0	0	0	0	0	0	0	0	0	2	0	0
8	12	CB	(England) Josh Stephenson	2	0	0	0	0	0	0	0	0	0	0	0	2	0	0
8	17	CM	(Slovakia) Matúš Holíček	2	0	0	0	0	0	0	0	0	0	0	0	2	0	0
8	19	CDM	(England) Owen Lunt	1	0	0	0	0	0	0	0	0	1	0	0	2	0	0
8	20	LW	(Wales) Calum Agius	2	0	0	0	0	0	0	0	0	0	0	0	2	0	0
14	4	CM	(Scotland) Kyle Ure	1	0	0	0	0	0	0	0	0	0	0	0	1	0	0
14	6	CB	(England) Luke Offord	1	0	0	0	0	0	0	0	0	0	0	0	1	0	0
14	21	RW	(England) Fin Roberts	0	0	0	0	0	0	0	0	0	1	0	0	1	0	0
14	37	CB	(England) Tom Graves	0	0	0	0	0	0	0	0	0	1	0	0	1	0	0
14	40	RB	(England) Gaël Nsenga	0	0	0	0	0	0	0	0	0	1	0	0	1	0	0
Totals				25	1	0	5	0	0	0	0	0	7	0	0	37	1	0

== Awards ==
=== EFL awards ===
==== EFL League Two Player of the Month ====
Month	Player		Ref.
August	(England) Josh March	Nominee	
