= Adrien Thibaut =

Irish footballer (born 2004)

Personal information
- Full name: Adrien Tinashe Thibaut
- Date of birth: 11 July 2004 (age 22)
- Place of birth: Slough, England
- Height: 1.80 m (5 ft 11 in)
- Position: Forward

Team information
- Current team: Crewe Alexandra
- Number: 29

Youth career
- –2020: College Corinthians
- 2020–2022: Douglas Hall
- 2022–2023: Cobh Ramblers

Senior career*
Years	Team	Apps	(Gls)
2023	Cobh Ramblers	5	(0)
2024	Macclesfield	0	(0)
2024	Bradford (Park Avenue)	9	(2)
2024–	Crewe Alexandra	57	(3)
2025	→ Southport (loan)	10	(4)

International career^{‡}
2024	Republic of Ireland U21	1	(0)
- * Club domestic league appearances and goals as of 16:38, 21 November 2026 (UTC) ‡ National team caps and goals as of 14:24, 25 September 2026 (UTC)

Adrien Tinashe Thibaut (born 11 July 2004) is an Irish professional footballer who plays as a forward for EFL League Two club Crewe Alexandra. He has also played for the Republic of Ireland U21 side.

== Club career ==
Born in Slough, Thibaut was raised in Ireland and came through the academies at College Corinthians, Douglas Hall and Cobh Ramblers.

=== Cobh Ramblers ===
In February 2023, Thibaut was promoted to the first team at Cobh Ramblers, making his debut as he came on as a substitute and scored in the Munster Senior Cup Final against Cork City on 14 August 2023, which The Rams won 3–1. He made his league debut eleven days later, coming on as an 88th–minute substitute for Matthew McKevitt during a 4–1 defeat against Galway United. Thibaut made five more appearances before leaving at the end of his contract on 30 November 2023.

=== Macclesfield ===
On 1 February 2024, Thibaut signed for English Northern Premier League Premier Division side Macclesfield on a free transfer. He made his only appearance for the club during a 2–0 away win against Hampton & Richmond Borough in the Fifth Round of the FA Trophy.

=== Bradford (Park Avenue) ===
On 2 March 2024, Thibaut signed for fellow Northern Premier League Premier Division side, Bradford (Park Avenue) on a deal until the end of the season. After making nine appearances, Thibaut was offered a new deal in May 2024, but opted to leave the club.

=== Crewe Alexandra ===
On 20 August 2024, Thibaut moved into professional league football as he signed for EFL League Two side Crewe Alexandra on a free transfer, and seven days later, he made his senior debut for Crewe during the first Group game in the EFL Trophy, against Liverpool U21s. Thibaut came on as a 72nd minute substitute for Fin Roberts and scored his first goal for the club two minutes later, as the hosts won 5–1 at Gresty Road. The following month, on 28 September 2024, Thibaut scored on his league debut for Crewe, in the side's 2–1 defeat at Newport County.

In October 2024, Thibaut signed a new contract running to summer 2026, with an option for a further 12 months.

==== Southport (loan) ====
In October 2025, after four Crewe appearances (scoring once), Thibaut went on a short-term loan to National League North side Southport, scoring his first goal for the Sandgrounders in his second game, a 2–1 win at Oxford City on 18 October 2025. He scored four goals in 10 league appearances for Southport during a two-month loan spell before being recalled by Crewe.

==== Return to Crewe ====
Thibaut scored the opening goal in a 1–1 draw (defeat on penalties) in an EFL Trophy tie at Stockport County on 3 December 2025, and impressed Crewe manager Lee Bell: "He's done really well on loan.... We needed him to play some games, get fit and score some goals. He works hard and he's now beginning to take chances better." In May 2026, Thibaut signed a new two-year contract, with a further 12-month option, to stay at Crewe.

== International career ==
In November 2024, Thibaut received his first call-up to the Republic of Ireland U21 team, being named in a 24-man squad for two friendlies in Spain against Sweden on 14 and 17 November. After being an unused substitute for the first fixture, he came on as a second-half substitute in the second match, a 3–2 win for Republic of Ireland U21s in Marbella.

== Career statistics ==
As of match played on 21 November 2026

Club	Season	Division	League		National Cup (Note: Includes FAI Cup & FA Cup)		League Cup (Note: Includes EFL Cup)		Other		Total	
Club	Season	Division	Apps	Goals	Apps	Goals	Apps	Goals	Apps	Goals	Apps	Goals
Cobh Ramblers	2023	LOI First Division	5	0	0	0	—		2 (Note: One appearance in Play-offs, one appearance and one goal in Munster Senior Cup)	1	7	1
Macclesfield	2023–24	Northern Premier League; Premier Division	0	0	0	0	0	0	1 (Note: Appearances in FA Trophy)	0	1	0
Bradford (Park Avenue)	2023–24	Northern Premier League; Premier Division	9	2	—		—		—		9	2
Crewe Alexandra	2024–25	League Two	18	1	1	0	0	0	3 (Note: Appearances in EFL Trophy)	1	22	2
Crewe Alexandra	2025–26	League Two	24	2	0	0	1	0	2	2	27	4
Crewe Alexandra	2026–27	League Two	15	0	1	0	2	1	3	1	21	2
Crewe Alexandra	Crewe total		57	3	2	0	3	1	8	4	70	8
Southport (loan)	2025–26	National League North	10	4	—		—		1	0	11	4
Career total			80	9	2	0	3	1	12	5	97	16
